= 1992 Russian Second League =

Russian Second League
- Season: 1992

The 1992 Russian Second League was the first edition of Russian Second Division. There were 6 zones with 115 teams in total.

== Zone 1 ==
{| class="wikitable" ! Pos ! Team ! 1991 league and position ! Head coach |- | bgcolor="#ccffcc" | 1. | FC Erzu Grozny | First professional season | Timur Kuriyev |- | bgcolor="#ccffcc" | 2. | FC Kolos Krasnodar | First professional season | Vladimir Petrov (until August)
Oleg Ivanov (from August) |- | 3. | FC Khimik Belorechensk | Soviet Second League B, Zone 4, 6th | Khamza Bagapov |- | 4. | FC Kavkazkabel Prokhladny | Soviet Second League B, Zone 4, 18th
(as FC Remontnik Prokhladny) | Sergei Ponomaryov |- | 5. | FC Anzhi Makhachkala | First professional season | Makhach Kerimov |- | 6. | FC Kuban Barannikovskiy | Soviet Second League B, Zone 5, 7th | Nikolai Smirnov |- | 7. | FC Kaspiy Kaspiysk | Soviet Second League B, Zone 4, 21st | Vyacheslav Lyogkiy |- | 8. | FC Mashuk Pyatigorsk | Soviet Second League B, Zone 4, 12th | Valeri Zubakov (until July)
Sergei Razaryonov (from August) |- | 9. | FC Torpedo Armavir | Soviet Second League B, Zone 4, 16th | Viktor Tishchenko (until August)
Viktor Anokhin (from August) |- | 10. | FC Beshtau Lermontov | First professional season | Viktor Vashchenko |- | 11. | FC Dynamo Izobilny | Soviet Second League B, Zone 4, 7th
(as FC Signal Izobilny) | Sergei Zimenkov / Igor Gileb |- | 12. | FC Druzhba Budyonnovsk | Soviet Second League B, Zone 4, 14th | Sergei Tashuev |- | 13. | FC Astrateks Astrakhan | First professional season | Ivan Buzychkin |- | 14. | FC Niva Slavyansk-na-Kubani | Soviet Second League B, Zone 5, 22nd
(as FC Golubaya Niva Slavyansk-na-Kubani) | Vladimir Vengrinovich |- | 15. | FC Venets Gulkevichi | First professional season | Anatoli Lyz |- | 16. | FC Urartu Grozny | First professional season | Ruslan Gargayev |- | 17. | FC Torpedo Adler | First professional season | Yuri Orduli (until August)
Yuri Nesterenko (from August) |- | style="background:#ffcccc;" | 18. | FC Altair-Khelling Derbent | Did not play professionally in 1991 | Aga Rzayev |- | style="background:#ffcccc;" | 19. | FC Lokomotiv Mineralnye Vody | Soviet Second League B, Zone 4, 15th | Vladimir Nigmatullin |- | style="background:#ffcccc;" | 20. | FC Vaynakh Shali | Soviet Second League B, Zone 4, 17th | Sergei Gridnev |- |}

=== Standings ===
Pos	Team	Pld	W	D	L	GF	GA	GD	Pts	Promotion or relegation
1	FC Erzu Grozny	38	28	6	4	93	17	+76	62	Promotion to First League
2	FC Kolos Krasnodar	38	28	4	6	83	25	+58	60	Promotion to First League
3	FC Khimik Belorechensk	38	24	5	9	70	45	+25	53	
4	FC Kavkazkabel Prokhladny	38	21	10	7	73	37	+36	52	
5	FC Anzhi Makhachkala	38	23	2	13	77	46	+31	48	
6	FC Kuban Barannikovskiy	38	21	3	14	71	40	+31	45	
7	FC Kaspiy Kaspiysk	38	16	9	13	45	41	+4	41	
8	FC Mashuk Pyatigorsk	38	16	8	14	53	43	+10	40	
9	FC Torpedo Armavir	38	17	5	16	52	67	−15	39	
10	FC Beshtau Lermontov	38	14	8	16	57	56	+1	36	
11	FC Dynamo Izobilny	38	13	10	15	39	39	0	36	Relegation to Amateur Football League
12	FC Druzhba Budyonnovsk	38	14	7	17	54	54	0	35	
13	FC Astrateks Astrakhan	38	15	4	19	51	62	−11	34	
14	FC Niva Slavyansk-na-Kubani	38	13	5	20	43	65	−22	31	
15	FC Venets Gulkevichi	38	10	9	19	47	65	−18	29	
16	FC Urartu Grozny	38	12	4	22	54	85	−31	28	
17	FC Torpedo Adler	38	11	4	23	46	66	−20	26	
18	FC Altair-Khelling Derbent	38	10	6	22	40	76	−36	26	Relegation to Amateur Football League
19	FC Lokomotiv Mineralnye Vody	38	11	2	25	44	87	−43	24	Relegation to Amateur Football League
20	FC Vaynakh Shali	38	6	3	29	33	109	−76	15	Relegation to Amateur Football League

Note: FC Dynamo Izobilny, FC Altair-Khelling Derbent, FC Lokomotiv Mineralnye Vody and FC Vaynakh Shali did not participate in any national-level competitions in 1993, including the Amateur Football League.

=== Top scorers ===
35 goals

- Igor Kuzmenko (FC Kolos Krasnodar)

23 goals

- Igor Khmelevskiy (FC Kavkazkabel Prokhladny)
- Igor Nikitin (FC Kuban Barannikovskiy)

16 goals

- Oleg Kozemov (FC Mashuk Pyatigorsk)
- Gennadi Kulnev (FC Lokomotiv Mineralnye Vody)

14 goals

- (Azerbaijan) Ibragim Gasanbekov (FC Anzhi Makhachkala)
- (Azerbaijan) Ruslan İdiqov (FC Erzu Grozny)
- Vladimir Shashorin (FC Venets Gulkevichi)

13 goals

- Artur Agabekyan (FC Torpedo Armavir)
- Igor Pirogov (FC Mashuk Pyatigorsk)
- Arif Romanov (FC Beshtau Lermontov)
- Pavel Sergiyenko (FC Kavkazkabel Prokhladny)

== Zone 2 ==
{| class="wikitable" ! Pos ! Team ! 1991 league and position ! Head coach |- | bgcolor="#ccffcc"|1. | FC Avtodor-Olaf Vladikavkaz | Soviet Second League B, Zone 4, 13th
(as FC Avtodor Vladikavkaz) | Givi Kerashvili |- | bgcolor="#ccffcc"|2. | FC Avangard Kamyshin | Soviet Second League B, Zone 5, 17th | Vladimir Borisov |- | 3. | FC SKA Rostov-on-Don | Soviet Second League B, Zone 4, 10th | Aleksandr Tumasyan |- | 4. | FC Shakhtyor Shakhty | Soviet Second League B, Zone 5, 9th | Yevgeni Grunin |- | 5. | FC Etalon Baksan | Soviet Second League B, Zone 4, 4th | Viktor Batalin |- | 6. | FC Zvezda-Rus Gorodishche | Soviet Second League B, Zone 4, 9th
(as FC Zvezda Gorodishche) | Vladimir Osipov (until August)
Radiy Rakhimov (from August) |- | 7. | FC Arsenal Tula | Soviet Second League B, Zone 5, 12th | Vladimir Alyokhin |- | style="background:#ffcccc;"|8. | FC Ritm Belgorod | Soviet Second League B, Zone 5, 6th | Aleksandr Kryuchkov |- | 9. | FC Volgar Astrakhan | Soviet Second League B, Zone 4, 11th | Vladimir Yulygin |- | 10. | FC Avangard Kursk | Soviet Second League B, Zone 5, 8th | Aleksandr Galkin |- | 11. | FC Irgiz Balakovo | First professional season | Vladimir Proskurin |- | 12. | FC Sherstyanik Nevinnomyssk | Soviet Second League B, Zone 4, 20th | Leonid Shevchenko |- | style="background:#ffcccc;"|13. | FC Start Yeysk | Soviet Second League B, Zone 5, 10th | Viktor Tsybin |- | 14. | FC Dynamo Bryansk | Soviet Second League, Center, 11th | Vyacheslav Perfilyev |- | 15. | FC Turbostroitel Kaluga | First professional season | Georgi Kolmogorov |- | style="background:#ffcccc;"|16. | FC Iskra Novoaleksandrovsk | First professional season | Yuri Kotov |- | 17. | FC Metallurg Krasny Sulin | Soviet Second League B, Zone 5, 21st | Gennadi Tevosov |- | 18. | FC Rotor-d Volgograd | First professional season | Pyotr Orlov |- | 19. | FC Spartak Oryol | Soviet Second League B, Zone 5, 18th | Valentin Gayan |- | 20. | FC Rostselmash-d Rostov-on-Don | First professional season | Viktor Odintsov / Valentin Khakhonov |- | 21. | FC Spartak Tambov | Soviet Second League B, Zone 5, 13th | Vladimir Kovylin |- | style="background:#ffcccc;"|22. | FC Tekstilshchik-d Kamyshin | First professional season | Vladimir Parmuzin |- |}

=== Standings ===
Pos	Team	Pld	W	D	L	GF	GA	GD	Pts	Promotion or relegation
1	FC Avtodor-Olaf Vladikavkaz	42	29	9	4	85	30	+55	67	Promotion to First League
2	FC Avangard Kamyshin	42	29	5	8	101	39	+62	63	Promotion to First League
3	FC SKA Rostov-on-Don	42	27	9	6	101	31	+70	63	
4	FC Shakhtyor Shakhty	42	25	8	9	75	36	+39	58	
5	FC Etalon Baksan	42	25	6	11	72	42	+30	56	
6	FC Zvezda-Rus Gorodishche	42	23	8	11	80	37	+43	54	
7	FC Arsenal Tula	42	22	7	13	56	45	+11	51	
8	FC Ritm Belgorod	42	22	6	14	80	55	+25	50	Relegation to Amateur Football League
9	FC Volgar Astrakhan	42	22	5	15	84	47	+37	49	
10	FC Avangard Kursk	42	22	3	17	67	67	0	47	
11	FC Irgiz Balakovo	42	20	5	17	88	55	+33	45	
12	FC Sherstyanik Nevinnomyssk	42	18	5	19	69	69	0	41	
13	FC Start Yeysk	42	16	6	20	76	79	−3	38	Relegation to Amateur Football League
14	FC Dynamo Bryansk	42	13	12	17	44	60	−16	38	
15	FC Turbostroitel Kaluga	42	12	12	18	53	62	−9	36	
16	FC Iskra Novoaleksandrovsk	42	13	6	23	52	73	−21	32	Relegation to Amateur Football League
17	FC Metallurg Krasny Sulin	42	13	4	25	57	88	−31	30	
18	FC Rotor-d Volgograd	42	11	6	25	39	76	−37	28	
19	FC Spartak Oryol	42	10	5	27	29	89	−60	25	
20	FC Rostselmash-d Rostov-on-Don	42	8	9	25	47	106	−59	25	
21	FC Spartak Tambov	42	4	10	28	30	83	−53	18	
22	FC Tekstilshchik-d Kamyshin	42	4	2	36	36	152	−116	10	Relegation to Amateur Football League

Note: FC Ritm Belgorod, FC Start Yeysk, FC Iskra Novoaleksandrovsk and FC Tekstilshchik-d Kamyshin did not participate in any national-level competitions in 1993, including the Amateur Football League.

=== Top scorers ===
46 goals

- Yuri Vostrukhin (FC SKA Rostov-on-Don)

29 goals

- Timur Bogatyryov (FC Ritm Belgorod)

27 goals

- Sergei Mironichev (FC Avangard Kamyshin)

24 goals

- Mikhail Golikov (FC Volgar Astrakhan)

22 goals

- Gennadi Remezov (FC Irgiz Balakovo)

21 goals

- Yuri Tolmachyov (FC Avangard Kursk)

20 goals

- Aleksandr Semenyukov (FC Start Yeysk)
- Yuri Yakovlev (FC Sherstyanik Nevinnomyssk)

19 goals

- Arsen Sekrekov (FC Etalon Baksan)

18 goals

- Vladimir Kharin (FC Irgiz Balakovo)

== Zone 3 ==
{| class="wikitable" ! Pos ! Team ! 1991 league and position ! Head coach |- | 1. | FC Spartak-d Moscow | First professional season | Viktor Zernov |- | bgcolor="#ccffcc"|2. | FC Znamya Truda Orekhovo-Zuyevo | Soviet Second League B, Zone 6, 11th | Yevgeni Zhuchkov |- | bgcolor="#ccffcc"|3. | FC Interros Moskovsky | First professional season | Leonid Pribylovsky |- | 4. | FC Torpedo Mytishchi | Soviet Second League B, Zone 5, 19th | Vyacheslav Zhuravlyov |- | style="background:#ffcccc;"|5. | FC Pele Moscow | First professional season | Aleksei Belenkov (until August)
Andrei Batov (from August) |- | 6. | FC Titan Reutov | First professional season | Valeri Vdovin |- | 7. | FC Dynamo-d Moscow | First professional season | Adamas Golodets |- | 8. | FC Oka Kolomna | Soviet Second League B, Zone 5, 11th | Aleksandr Kuznetsov |- | 9. | FC Avangard Kolomna | Did not play professionally in 1991 | Vyacheslav Sarychev |- | 10. | FC Torgmash Lyubertsy | Soviet Second League B, Zone 5, 20th | Anatoli Leshchenkov |- | 11. | PFC CSKA-d Moscow | First professional season | Aleksandr Kolpovskiy |- | 12. | FC Torpedo-d Moscow | First professional season | Sergei Petrenko |- | 13. | PFC CSKA-2 Moscow | Soviet Second League B, Zone 6, 22nd | Leonid Nazarenko |- | 14. | FC Saturn Ramenskoye | Soviet Second League B, Zone 6, 13th | Valeri Tyukulmin |- | 15. | FC TRASKO Moscow | Soviet Second League B, Zone 6, 18th
(as FC Zvezda Moscow) | Viktor Razumovskiy |- | 16. | FC Presnya Moscow | Soviet Second League B, Zone 6, 19th | Gennadi Sakharov / Yuri Vanyushkin |- | 17. | FC Dynamo-2 Moscow | Soviet Second League B, Zone 6, 20th | Yevgeni Baikov |- | 18. | FC Mosenergo Moscow | First professional season | Valentin Sysoyev |- | 19. | FC Lokomotiv-d Moscow | First professional season | Vladimir Korotkov |- | style="background:#ffcccc;"|20. | FC Trestar Ostankino | First professional season | Mikhail Glazunov |- | style="background:#ffcccc;"|21. | FC Kinotavr Podolsk | First professional season | Yuri Khromov / Andrei Romanov |}

=== Standings ===
Pos	Team	Pld	W	D	L	GF	GA	GD	Pts	Promotion or relegation
1	FC Spartak-d Moscow	40	27	10	3	113	28	+85	64	
2	FC Znamya Truda Orekhovo-Zuyevo	40	25	7	8	73	22	+51	57	Promoted to the 1993 Russian First League
3	FC Interros Moskovsky	40	23	9	8	81	33	+48	55	Promoted to the 1993 Russian First League
4	FC Torpedo Mytishchi	40	24	6	10	68	36	+32	54	
5	FC Pele Moscow	40	20	12	8	64	35	+29	52	Relegation to Amateur Football League
6	FC Titan Reutov	40	22	7	11	75	39	+36	51	
7	FC Dynamo-d Moscow	40	20	10	10	77	49	+28	50	
8	FC Oka Kolomna	40	19	12	9	56	40	+16	50	
9	FC Avangard Kolomna	40	20	9	11	64	42	+22	49	
10	FC Torgmash Lyubertsy	40	17	11	12	65	56	+9	45	
11	PFC CSKA-d Moscow	40	18	8	14	74	60	+14	44	
12	FC Torpedo-d Moscow	40	15	8	17	46	59	−13	38	
13	PFC CSKA-2 Moscow	40	14	8	18	56	59	−3	36	
14	FC Saturn Ramenskoye	40	13	9	18	49	61	−12	35	
15	FC TRASKO Moscow	40	12	9	19	54	72	−18	33	
16	FC Presnya Moscow	40	13	5	22	57	90	−33	31	
17	FC Dynamo-2 Moscow	40	10	9	21	41	78	−37	29	
18	FC Mosenergo Moscow	40	10	7	23	35	69	−34	27	
19	FC Lokomotiv-d Moscow	40	7	7	26	36	67	−31	21	
20	FC Trestar Ostankino	40	6	3	31	27	94	−67	15	Relegation to Amateur Football League
21	FC Kinotavr Podolsk	40	2	0	38	25	147	−122	4	Relegation to Amateur Football League

Notes:

1. FC Spartak-d Moscow was the reserves squad for FC Spartak Moscow and could not advance to the Russian First League according to the rules of the competition.
2. FC Pele Moscow, FC Trestar Ostankino and FC Kinotavr Podolsk did not participate in any national-level competitions in 1993, including the Amateur Football League.

=== Top scorers ===
26 goals

- Mikhail Maryushkin (FC Pele Moscow)

19 goals

- (Ukraine) Serhiy Perepadenko (FC Spartak-d Moscow)

17 goals

- Nikolai Kovardayev (FC Dynamo-d Moscow)
- Sergei Lavrentyev (FC Interros Moskovskiy)
- Igor Pimenov (FC Znamya Truda Orekhovo-Zuyevo)

16 goals

- Aleksei Bychkov (PFC CSKA-2 Moscow)
- Gennadi Filippov (FC Avangard Kolomna)
- Nikolai Popenko (FC Torpedo Mytishchi)
- Dmitri Prokopenko (FC TRASKO Moscow)

15 goals

- Andrei Gashkin (FC Znamya Truda Orekhovo-Zuyevo)
- Andrei Golubev (FC Pele Moscow)

== Zone 4 ==
{| class="wikitable" ! Pos ! Team ! 1991 league and position ! Head coach |- | bgcolor="#ccffcc"| 1. | FC Baltika Kaliningrad | Soviet Second League B, Zone 6, 5th | Yuri Vasenin (until June)
Kornei Shperling (from July) |- | bgcolor="#ccffcc"| 2. | FC Smena-Saturn St. Petersburg | First professional season | Mark Rubin (until May)
Viktor Vinogradov (from June) |- | 3. | FC Mashinostroitel Pskov | Soviet Second League B, Zone 6, 9th | Vladimir Kosogov |- | 4. | FC Khimik Dzerzhinsk | Soviet Second League B, Zone 5, 14th | Mikhail Senyurin |- | 5. | FC Torpedo Arzamas | Soviet Second League B, Zone 7, 12th
(as FC Znamya Arzamas) | Vladimir Dergach |- | 6. | FC Lokomotiv St. Petersburg | Did not play professionally in 1991 | Mikhail Pavlov (until May)
Sergei Vedeneyv (from June) |- | 7. | FC Aleks Gatchina | First professional season | Nikolai Gosudarenkov |- | 8. | FC Vympel Rybinsk | Did not play professionally in 1991 | Anatoli Kurbatov (until May)
Yevgeni Bekenev (May–July)
Vladimir Bubnov (from August) |- | 9. | FC Bulat Cherepovets | Soviet Second League B, Zone 6, 8th
(as FC Khimik Cherepovets) | Vladislav Mikhailovskiy |- | 10. | FC Progress Chernyakhovsk | Soviet Second League B, Zone 6, 14th | Aleksandr Fyodorov |- | 11. | FC Torpedo Pavlovo | Did not play professionally in 1991 | Valeri Kalugin |- | 12. | FC Iskra Smolensk | Soviet Second League B, Zone 6, 7th | Anatoli Olkhovik |- | 13. | FC Zenit Penza | Soviet Second League B, Zone 7, 17th
(as FC Granit Penza) | Aleksandr Komissarov |- | 14. | FC Kosmos-Kirovets St. Petersburg | Soviet Second League B, Zone 6, 12th
(as FC Kirovets St. Petersburg) | Yuri Rudnev |- | 15. | FC Sputnik Kimry | First professional season | None |- | style="background:#ffcccc;"| 16. | FC Volzhanin Kineshma | Soviet Second League B, Zone 6, 6th | Vladimir Yermichev |- | 17. | FC Zvolma-Spartak Kostroma | Soviet Second League B, Zone 6, 17th
(as FC Spartak Kostroma) | Vyacheslav Skoropekin |- | 18. | FC Karelia Petrozavodsk | Soviet Second League B, Zone 6, 15th
(as FC Spartak Petrozavodsk) | Yevgeni Sokolov (until July)
Gennadi Sarychev (from August) |- | style="background:#ffcccc;"|19. | FC Galaks St. Petersburg | First professional season | Vladimir Tsimerman |- | 20. | FC Volochanin Vyshny Volochyok | Soviet Second League B, Zone 6, 21st | Aleksandr Semyonov |- |}

=== Standings ===
Pos	Team	Pld	W	D	L	GF	GA	GD	Pts	Promotion or relegation
1	FC Baltika Kaliningrad	38	24	8	6	78	27	+51	56	Promotion to First League
2	FC Smena-Saturn St. Petersburg	38	24	6	8	76	33	+43	54	Promotion to First League
3	FC Mashinostroitel Pskov	38	19	13	6	43	23	+20	51	
4	FC Khimik Dzerzhinsk	38	19	10	9	50	32	+18	48	
5	FC Torpedo Arzamas	38	19	10	9	58	39	+19	48	
6	FC Lokomotiv St. Petersburg	38	16	14	8	50	33	+17	46	
7	FC Aleks Gatchina	38	16	13	9	50	33	+17	45	
8	FC Vympel Rybinsk	38	16	13	9	51	30	+21	45	
9	FC Bulat Cherepovets	38	17	9	12	51	33	+18	43	
10	FC Progress Chernyakhovsk	38	16	10	12	51	36	+15	42	
11	FC Torpedo Pavlovo	38	14	11	13	51	50	+1	39	
12	FC Iskra Smolensk	38	14	10	14	47	37	+10	38	
13	FC Zenit Penza	38	11	13	14	43	51	−8	35	
14	FC Kosmos-Kirovets St. Petersburg	38	11	10	17	35	52	−17	32	
15	FC Sputnik Kimry	38	12	4	22	43	73	−30	28	
16	FC Volzhanin Kineshma	38	9	10	19	28	49	−21	28	Relegation to Amateur Football League
17	FC Zvolma-Spartak Kostroma	38	9	9	20	35	58	−23	27	
18	FC Karelia Petrozavodsk	38	9	6	23	25	66	−41	24	
19	FC Galaks St. Petersburg	38	4	8	26	25	77	−52	16	Relegation to Amateur Football League
20	FC Volochanin Vyshny Volochyok	38	4	7	27	26	84	−58	15	

Notes:

1. FC Agtala Moscow was excluded from the league after playing 13 games (gaining 6 points in those). Agtala's results were discarded. They were coached by Igor Kiryakov and were playing their first professional season.
2. FC Volzhanin Kineshma and FC Galaks St. Petersburg did not participate in any national-level competitions in 1993, including the Amateur Football League.

=== Top scorers ===
25 goals

- Andrei Lapushkin (FC Smena-Saturn St. Petersburg)

18 goals

- Yuri Telyushov (FC Zenit Penza)

16 goals

- Aleksei Kostyunin (FC Torpedo Arzamas)

15 goals

- Yuri Kopylov (FC Baltika Kaliningrad)
- Dmitri Silin (FC Lokomotiv St. Petersburg)

14 goals

- Vladimir Rozhin (FC Bulat Cherepovets)

13 goals

- Sergei Antonov (FC Khimik Dzerzhinsk)
- Sergei Kornev (FC Torpedo Arzamas)
- Oleg Pritula (FC Baltika Kaliningrad)
- Oleg Sofonov (FC Torpedo Pavlovo)
- Igor Yershov (FC Khimik Dzerzhinsk)

== Zone 5 ==
{| class="wikitable" ! Pos ! Team ! 1991 league and position ! Head coach |- | bgcolor="#ccffcc"| 1. | FC Neftekhimik Nizhnekamsk | Soviet Second League B, Zone 7, 9th | Vladimir Morozov (until July)
Vladimir Mukhanov (from August) |- | bgcolor="#ccffcc"| 2. | FC Gazovik Izhevsk | Soviet Second League B, Zone 7, 10th | Aleksandr Salnov |- | 3. | FC Avtopribor Oktyabrsky | Soviet Second League B, Zone 7, 15th | Viktor Khaidarov |- | 4. | FC Tekstilshchik Isheyevka | Soviet Second League, Center, 19th
(as FC Start Ulyanovsk) | Aleksandr Korolyov |- | 5. | FC Sibir Kurgan | Soviet Second League B, Zone 7, 8th | Viktor Prozorov |- | 6. | FC Gornyak Kachkanar | First professional season | Viktor Shlyayev |- | 7. | FC Metallurg Novotroitsk | Soviet Second League B, Zone 7, 16th | Ivan Kikhtenko (until July)
Vyacheslav Ledovskikh (from July) |- | 8. | FC Azamat Cheboksary | Soviet Second League B, Zone 7, 11th
(as FC Stal Cheboksary) | Gerold Drandov |- | 9. | FC Zarya Krotovka | Soviet Second League B, Zone 7, 21st
(as FC Zarya Podgorny) | Aleksandr Druganin |- | 10. | FC KATs-Skif Naberezhnye Chelny | First professional season | Nikolai Nabok |- | style="background:#ffcccc;"| 11. | FC Skat-5s Yelabuga | First professional season | Viktor Fedulov (until July)
Ivan Yevsin (from August) |- | 12. | FC Elektron Vyatskiye Polyany | Soviet Second League B, Zone 7, 14th | Aleksandr Sokovnin |- | 13. | FC Energiya Chaykovsky | First professional season | Sergei Kleymyonov |- | 14. | FC Sodovik Sterlitamak | Soviet Second League B, Zone 7, 13th
(as FC Kauchuk Sterlitamak) | Viktor Sukhanov |- | 15. | FC Torpedo-UdGu Izhevsk | First professional season | Nikolai Gorshkov |- | 16. | FC MGU Saransk | First professional season | Igor Shinkarenko |- | 17. | FC Gazovik Orenburg | Soviet Second League B, Zone 7, 18th | Nikolai Yelanev |- | style="background:#ffcccc;"|18. | FC Idel Kazan | First professional season | Aleksandr Klobukov |- |}

=== Standings ===
Pos	Team	Pld	W	D	L	GF	GA	GD	Pts	Promotion or relegation
1	FC Neftekhimik Nizhnekamsk	34	22	10	2	72	16	+56	54	Promotion to First League
2	FC Gazovik Izhevsk	34	20	8	6	61	27	+34	48	Promotion to First League
3	FC Avtopribor Oktyabrsky	34	19	8	7	51	24	+27	46	
4	FC Tekstilshchik Isheyevka	34	19	7	8	65	31	+34	45	
5	FC Sibir Kurgan	34	16	12	6	39	18	+21	44	
6	FC Gornyak Kachkanar	34	17	9	8	50	29	+21	43	
7	FC Metallurg Novotroitsk	34	17	8	9	60	28	+32	42	
8	FC Azamat Cheboksary	34	15	9	10	44	28	+16	39	
9	FC Zarya Krotovka	34	16	6	12	41	36	+5	38	
10	FC KATs-Skif Naberezhnye Chelny	34	13	10	11	34	33	+1	36	
11	FC Skat-5s Yelabuga	34	11	11	12	23	44	−21	33	Relegation to Amateur Football League
12	FC Elektron Vyatskiye Polyany	34	12	6	16	38	37	+1	30	
13	FC Energiya Chaykovsky	34	7	8	19	24	46	−22	22	
14	FC Sodovik Sterlitamak	34	7	7	20	39	68	−29	21	
15	FC Torpedo-UdGu Izhevsk	34	8	4	22	44	74	−30	20	
16	FC MGU Saransk	34	7	6	21	25	67	−42	20	
17	FC Gazovik Orenburg	34	5	8	21	29	74	−45	18	
18	FC Idel Kazan	34	5	3	26	28	87	−59	13	Relegation to Amateur Football League

Notes:

1. FC Skat-5s Yelabuga and FC Idel Kazan did not participate in any national-level competitions in 1993, including the Amateur Football League.

=== Top scorers ===
26 goals

- Eduard Rakhmangulov (FC Neftekhimik Nizhnekamsk)

18 goals

- Stanislav Fedotov (FC Tekstilshchik Isheyevka)

17 goals

- Viktor Tishkin (FC Azamat Cheboksary)

14 goals

- Aleksei Musikhin (FC Torpedo-UdGU Izhevsk / FC Gazovik Izhevsk)

13 goals

- Vyacheslav Suspitsin (FC Gazovik Orenburg)
- Oleg Vyatchanin (FC Torpedo-UdGU Izhevsk / FC Gazovik Izhevsk)

12 goals

- Oleg Kamyshev (FC Metallurg Novotroitsk)
- Igor Syrov (FC Avtopribor Oktyabrsky)
- Aleksandr Varnosov (FC Azamat Cheboksary)
- Dmitri Yemelyanov (FC Zarya Krotovka)

== Zone 6 ==
{| class="wikitable" ! Pos ! Team ! 1991 league and position ! Head coach |- | bgcolor="#ccffcc"|1. | FC Zarya Leninsk-Kuznetsky | Soviet Second League B, Zone 10, 17th
(as FC Shakhtyor Leninsk-Kuznetsky) | Sergei Vasyutin |- | bgcolor="#ccffcc"|2. | FC Metallurg Aldan | First professional season | Vladimir Nomirovskiy |- | 3. | FC Aleks Angarsk | Soviet Second League B, Zone 10, 14th
(as FC Angara Angarsk) | Boris Zhuravlyov (until June)
Oleg Izmailov (from June) |- | 4. | FC Torpedo Rubtsovsk | Soviet Second League B, Zone 10, 15th | Vladimir Vorgeyev |- | 5. | FC Dynamo Kemerovo | Soviet Second League B, Zone 10, 13th | Boris Rusanov |- | 6. | FC Agan Raduzhny | First professional season | Aleksandr Shudrik |- | 7. | FC Shakhtyor Artyom | Soviet Second League B, Zone 10, 16th | Aleksandr Kezin (until July)
Boris Kolokolov (from August) |- | 8. | FC Gornyak Gramoteino | First professional season | Vyacheslav Poddubny |- | style="background:#ffcccc;"|9. | FC Neftyanik Uray | First professional season | Leonid Shor |- | 10. | FC Politekhnik-92 Barnaul | First professional season | Valeri Afonin |- | style="background:#ffcccc;"|11. | FC Spartak Gorno-Altaysk | First professional season | Aleksandr Pavlov |- | style="background:#ffcccc;"|12. | FC Angara Boguchany | First professional season | Suleyman Demirdzhi |- | style="background:#ffcccc;"|13. | FC Progress Biysk | Soviet Second League B, Zone 10, 18th | Aleksandr Meyzer |- |}

=== Standings ===
Pos	Team	Pld	W	D	L	GF	GA	GD	Pts	Promotion or relegation
1	FC Zarya Leninsk-Kuznetsky	24	18	4	2	67	12	+55	40	Promotion to First League
2	FC Metallurg Aldan	24	18	2	4	47	15	+32	38	Promotion to First League
3	FC Aleks Angarsk	24	15	2	7	52	23	+29	32	
4	FC Torpedo Rubtsovsk	24	14	4	6	37	28	+9	32	
5	FC Dynamo Kemerovo	24	12	5	7	27	17	+10	29	
6	FC Agan Raduzhny	24	12	3	9	35	16	+19	27	
7	FC Shakhtyor Artyom	24	10	5	9	26	25	+1	25	
8	FC Gornyak Gramoteino	24	9	4	11	26	27	−1	22	
9	FC Neftyanik Uray	24	7	5	12	21	52	−31	19	Relegation to Amateur Football League
10	FC Politekhnik-92 Barnaul	24	5	6	13	32	39	−7	16	
11	FC Spartak Gorno-Altaysk	24	6	3	15	20	46	−26	15	Relegation to Amateur Football League
12	FC Angara Boguchany	24	4	4	16	19	38	−19	12	Relegation to Amateur Football League
13	FC Progress Biysk	24	2	1	21	11	82	−71	5	Relegation to Amateur Football League

Notes:

1. FC Neftyanik Uray, FC Spartak Gorno-Altaysk, FC Angara Boguchany and FC Progress Biysk did not participate in any national-level competitions in 1993, including the Amateur Football League.

=== Top scorers ===
22 goals

- Sergei Toporov (FC Zarya Leninsk-Kuznetsky)

13 goals

- Yevgeni Burdinskiy (FC Zarya Leninsk-Kuznetsky)

11 goals

- Ruslan Yalovenko (FC Neftyanik Uray)

10 goals

- Yuri Kuznetsov (FC Aleks Angarsk)
- Yevgeni Savin (FC Politekhnik-92 Barnaul)

9 goals

- Yuri Miller (FC Spartak Gorno-Altaysk)
- Yuri Sergiyenko (FC Shakhtyor Artyom)

8 goals

- Sergey Ageyev (FC Politekhnik-92 Barnaul)
- Igor Kuzmin (FC Dynamo Kemerovo)
- Anatoli Panchenko (FC Torpedo Rubtsovsk)

== See also ==
- 1992 Russian Top League
- 1992 Russian First League
