= 1995 Russian Second League =

Russian Second League
- Season: 1995

The 1995 Russian Second League was the fourth edition of the Russian Second Division. It was the first season when 3 points were awarded for a win. There were 3 zones with 62 teams starting the competition (1 was excluded before the end of the season).

== Zone West ==
=== Overview ===
| Team | Head coach |
|---|---|
| PFC Spartak Nalchik | Boris Sinitsyn |
| FC Kuban Krasnodar | Fyodor Novikov (until September); Vladimir Brazhnikov (from October) |
| FC Torpedo Taganrog | Anatoly Bulgakov |
| FC Gekris Anapa | Akop Kalandzhan |
| FC Lokomotiv St. Petersburg | Givi Nodia |
| FC CSK VVS-Kristall Smolensk | Igor Belanovich |
| FC Anzhi Makhachkala | Rafael Safarov |
| FC Avtozapchast Baksan | Viktor Kumykov |
| FC Metallurg Lipetsk | Valeri Tretyakov |
| FC Spartak Shchyolkovo | Aleksei Petrushin |
| FC Energiya Pyatigorsk | Sergei Razaryonov |
| FC Iriston Vladikavkaz | Aleksandr Katsiyev |
| FC Avtodor-BMK Vladikavkaz | Givi Kerashvili |
| FC Kavkazkabel Prokhladny | Sergei Ponomaryov |
| FC Gatchina | Nikolai Gosudarenkov |
| FC Dynamo Vologda | Vladimir Pavlenko |
| FC SKA Rostov-on-Don | Valeri Sinau |
| FC Avangard-Kortek Kolomna | Vyacheslav Sarychev |
| FC Salyut Belgorod | Anatoli Bogdanov |
| FC Trion-Volga Tver | Andrei Sergeyev |
| FC Venets Gulkevichi | Anatoli Lyz |
| FC Orekhovo Orekhovo-Zuyevo | Sergei Bondar |

=== Standings ===
| Pos | Team | Pld | W | D | L | GF | GA | GD | Pts | Promotion or relegation |
|---|---|---|---|---|---|---|---|---|---|---|
| 1 | Spartak Nalchik (A) | 42 | 30 | 6 | 6 | 127 | 49 | +78 | 96 | Promotion to First League |
| 2 | Kuban Krasnodar (A) | 42 | 27 | 6 | 9 | 107 | 61 | +46 | 87 | Promotion to First League |
| 3 | Torpedo Taganrog | 42 | 26 | 7 | 9 | 78 | 36 | +42 | 85 | |
| 4 | Gekris Anapa (Note: FC Spartak Anapa renamed to FC Gekris.) (R) | 42 | 25 | 7 | 10 | 71 | 37 | +34 | 82 | Relegation to Third League |
| 5 | Lokomotiv St. Petersburg (A) | 42 | 24 | 5 | 13 | 74 | 44 | +30 | 77 | Promotion to First League |
| 6 | CSK VVS-Kristall Smolensk (Note: FC Kristall Smolensk renamed to FC CSK VVS-Kristall.) | 42 | 23 | 8 | 11 | 58 | 35 | +23 | 77 (Note: FC CSK-VVS Kristall Smolensk, FC Energiya Pyatigorsk and FC Avtodor-BMK Vladikavkaz awarded 1 home win each.) | |
| 7 | Anzhi Makhachkala | 42 | 24 | 4 | 14 | 77 | 43 | +34 | 76 (Note: FC Anzhi Makhachkala awarded 5 home wins.) | |
| 8 | Avtozapchast Baksan | 42 | 23 | 5 | 14 | 66 | 60 | +6 | 74 | |
| 9 | Metallurg Lipetsk | 42 | 20 | 7 | 15 | 59 | 44 | +15 | 67 | |
| 10 | Spartak Shchyolkovo | 42 | 20 | 6 | 16 | 65 | 54 | +11 | 66 | |
| 11 | Energiya Pyatigorsk | 42 | 17 | 9 | 16 | 45 | 40 | +5 | 60 | |
| 12 | Iriston Vladikavkaz | 42 | 18 | 2 | 22 | 62 | 78 | −16 | 56 | |
| 13 | Avtodor-BMK Vladikavkaz (Note: FC Avtodor-Olaf Vladikavkaz renamed to FC Avtodor-BMK.) | 42 | 17 | 4 | 21 | 64 | 66 | −2 | 55 | |
| 14 | Kavkazkabel Prokhladny | 42 | 16 | 4 | 22 | 62 | 73 | −11 | 52 | |
| 15 | Gatchina | 42 | 15 | 5 | 22 | 49 | 58 | −9 | 50 | |
| 16 | Dynamo Vologda | 42 | 12 | 8 | 22 | 43 | 65 | −22 | 44 | |
| 17 | SKA Rostov-on-Don | 42 | 12 | 8 | 22 | 42 | 81 | −39 | 44 | |
| 18 | Avangard-Kortek Kolomna (R) | 42 | 11 | 9 | 22 | 55 | 67 | −12 | 42 | Relegation to Third League |
| 19 | Salyut Belgorod (R) | 42 | 11 | 6 | 25 | 51 | 98 | −47 | 39 | Relegation to Third League |
| 20 | Trion-Volga Tver (R) | 42 | 10 | 4 | 28 | 36 | 73 | −37 | 34 | Relegation to Third League |
| 21 | Venets Gulkevichi (R) | 42 | 9 | 6 | 27 | 33 | 107 | −74 | 33 | Relegation to Third League |
| 22 | Orekhovo Orekhovo-Zuyevo (R) | 42 | 7 | 4 | 31 | 28 | 83 | −55 | 25 | Relegation to Third League |

Source: RSSSF
(A) Advance to a further round; (R) Relegated

=== Top goalscorers ===
30 goals

- Aleksei Gerasimenko (FC Kuban Krasnodar)

24 goals

- (Azerbaijan) Ibragim Gasanbekov (FC Anzhi Makhachkala)

23 goals

- Valeri Solyanik (FC CSK VVS-Kristall Smolensk)

22 goals

- Oleg Kirimov (PFC Spartak Nalchik)

21 goals

- Stanislav Lysenko (FC Kuban Krasnodar)

20 goals

- Soslan Gazanov (FC Iriston Vladikavkaz)

19 goals

- Valeri Popov (FC Torpedo Taganrog)

17 goals

- Aslan Goplachev (PFC Spartak Nalchik)
- (Georgia (country)) Varlam Kilasonia (FC Lokomotiv St. Petersburg)

16 goals

- Maksim Balayev (FC Kavkazkabel Prokhladny)
- Igor Danilov (FC Lokomotiv St. Petersburg)
- Gennady Korkin (FC Metallurg Lipetsk)
- Vladimir Polikarpov (FC Spartak Shchyolkovo)
- Vitali Yermilov (FC Torpedo Taganrog)

== Zone Centre ==
=== Overview ===
| Team | Head coach |
|---|---|
| FC Gazovik-Gazprom Izhevsk | Viktor Slesarev |
| FC Saturn Ramenskoye | Vladimir Mukhanov |
| FC Lada Dimitrovgrad | Vladimir Yevsyukov |
| FC Nosta Novotroitsk | Valeri Znarok |
| FC Tekstilshchik Ivanovo | Vladimir Belkov |
| FC Arsenal Tula | Anatoli Polosin |
| FC Volgar-Gazprom Astrakhan | Vladimir Yerofeyev |
| FC Svetotekhnika Saransk | Aleksandr Korolyov |
| FC Spartak Ryazan | Sergei Nedosekin |
| FC Zvezda Gorodishche | Sergei Mukovnin |
| FC Industriya Obninsk | Yuri Karamyan |
| FC UralAZ Miass | Aleksandr Yezhakov |
| FC Metallurg Magnitogorsk | Igor Kasyuk |
| FC Sibir Kurgan | Vladimir Sizontov |
| FC SKD Samara | Georgi Verbovskiy |
| FC Uralets Nizhny Tagil | Vladimir Yulygin |
| FC Rubin Kazan | Murat Zadikashvili |
| FC Torpedo Pavlovo | Aleksandr Sarafannikov |
| FC Zenit Izhevsk | Aleksandr Maslov |
| FC Torpedo Vladimir | Nikolai Pavelyev |
| FC Zvezda Perm | Viktor Zvyagin |
| FC Devon Oktyabrsky | Viktor Khaydarov |

=== Standings ===
| Pos | Team | Pld | W | D | L | GF | GA | GD | Pts | Promotion or relegation |
|---|---|---|---|---|---|---|---|---|---|---|
| 1 | Gazovik-Gazprom Izhevsk (A) | 40 | 29 | 7 | 4 | 89 | 30 | +59 | 94 | Promotion to First League |
| 2 | Saturn Ramenskoye (A) | 40 | 29 | 6 | 5 | 81 | 21 | +60 | 93 | Promotion to First League |
| 3 | Lada Dimitrovgrad | 40 | 27 | 6 | 7 | 87 | 34 | +53 | 87 (Note: FC Lada Dimitrovgrad and FC Metallurg Magnitogorsk awarded 1 home win each.) | |
| 4 | Nosta Novotroitsk (Note: FC Metallurg Novotroitsk renamed to FC Nosta.) | 40 | 24 | 10 | 6 | 68 | 32 | +36 | 82 | |
| 5 | Tekstilshchik Ivanovo | 40 | 23 | 4 | 13 | 73 | 49 | +24 | 73 | |
| 6 | Arsenal Tula | 40 | 19 | 10 | 11 | 61 | 43 | +18 | 67 | |
| 7 | Volgar-Gazprom Astrakhan (Note: FC Volgar Astrakhan renamed to FC Volgar-Gazprom.) | 40 | 19 | 7 | 14 | 48 | 41 | +7 | 64 | |
| 8 | Svetotekhnika Saransk | 40 | 18 | 8 | 14 | 43 | 48 | −5 | 62 | |
| 9 | Spartak Ryazan (Note: FC Torpedo Ryazan renamed to FC Spartak.) | 40 | 14 | 11 | 15 | 40 | 39 | +1 | 53 | |
| 10 | Zvezda Gorodishche (R) | 40 | 14 | 9 | 17 | 63 | 63 | 0 | 51 | Relegation to Third League |
| 11 | Industriya Obninsk (Note: FC Obninsk renamed to FC Industriya.) | 40 | 15 | 3 | 22 | 48 | 64 | −16 | 48 | |
| 12 | UralAZ Miass (Note: FC Torpedo Miass renamed to FC UralAZ.) | 40 | 13 | 9 | 18 | 43 | 49 | −6 | 48 (Note: FC UralAZ Miass awarded 1 home win and 3 home losses.) | |
| 13 | Metallurg Magnitogorsk | 40 | 14 | 5 | 21 | 52 | 66 | −14 | 47 | |
| 14 | Sibir Kurgan | 40 | 12 | 9 | 19 | 41 | 59 | −18 | 45 | |
| 15 | SKD Samara (Note: FC SKD Samara and FC Zvezda Perm did not participate in any national-level competitions in 1996.) (R) | 40 | 13 | 5 | 22 | 44 | 63 | −19 | 44 | Relegation to Third League |
| 16 | Uralets Nizhny Tagil (R) | 40 | 11 | 10 | 19 | 47 | 56 | −9 | 43 | Relegation to Third League |
| 17 | Rubin Kazan | 40 | 12 | 6 | 22 | 32 | 56 | −24 | 42 | |
| 18 | Torpedo Pavlovo | 40 | 12 | 5 | 23 | 36 | 69 | −33 | 41 (Note: FC Torpedo Pavlovo awarded 1 home loss.) | |
| 19 | Zenit Izhevsk | 40 | 10 | 6 | 24 | 36 | 76 | −40 | 36 | |
| 20 | Torpedo Vladimir (R) | 40 | 10 | 5 | 25 | 42 | 80 | −38 | 35 | Relegation to Third League |
| 21 | Zvezda Perm (R) | 40 | 8 | 7 | 25 | 41 | 77 | −36 | 31 | Relegation to Third League |
| – | Devon Oktyabrsky | 13 | – | – | – | – | – | — | 0 (Note: FC Devon Oktyabrsky was excluded from the league after playing 13 games and gaining 13 points. All their results were discarded. Devon did not participate in any national-level competitions in 1996.) | |

Source: RSSSF
(A) Advance to a further round; (R) Relegated

=== Top goalscorers ===
29 goals

- Aleksandr Zaikin (FC Lada Dimitrovgrad)

20 goals

- Aleksei Chernov (FC Zvezda Gorodishche)
- (Kazakhstan) Taras Trizna (FC Nosta Novotroitsk)

18 goals

- Aleksei Bobrov (FC Lada Dimitrovgrad)
- Nikolai Sukhov (FC Tekstilshchik Ivanovo)
- Sergei Yuminov (FC Gazovik-Gazprom Izhevsk)

16 goals

- Sergei Budarin (FC Nosta Novotroitsk)
- Igor Pimenov (FC Industriya Obninsk)

15 goals

- Aleksandr Zernov (FC Tekstilshchik Ivanovo)

14 goals

- Sergei Chesnakas (FC Lada Dimitrovgrad)
- Andrei Glukhikh (FC Gazovik-Gazprom Izhevsk)
- Andrei Knyazev (FC Metallurg Magnitogorsk)
- Aleksandr Sevidov (FC UralAZ Miass)

== Zone East ==
=== Overview ===
| Team | Head coach |
|---|---|
| FC Metallurg Krasnoyarsk | Aleksandr Kishinevsky |
| FC Dynamo Barnaul | Aleksandr Gostenin |
| FC Kuzbass Kemerovo | Boris Rusanov |
| FC Metallurg-ZapSib Novokuznetsk | Vladislav Sosnov |
| FC Amur Blagoveshchensk | Ivan Nikolayev |
| FC Irtysh Tobolsk | Rudolf Atamalyan |
| FC Sakhalin Kholmsk | Valeri Yerkovich |
| FC Tom Tomsk | Vladimir Pomeshchikov |
| FC Selenga Ulan-Ude | Valeri Mikhnov |
| FC Motor Prokopyevsk | Yaroslav Khomin |
| FC Dynamo Omsk | Anatoli Chikinskiy |
| FC Dynamo Yakutsk | Anatoli Samkov |
| FC Viktoriya Nazarovo | Konstantin Kamaltynov |
| FC SKA Khabarovsk | Vladimir Krymskiy |
| FC Torpedo Rubtsovsk | Viktor Kuzmenko |
| FC Angara Angarsk | Oleg Izmaylov |
| FC Samotlor-XXI Nizhnevartovsk | Valeri Zhuravlyov |
| FC Mezhdurechensk | Viktor Kolmogorov |

=== Standings ===
| Pos | Team | Pld | W | D | L | GF | GA | GD | Pts | Promotion or relegation |
|---|---|---|---|---|---|---|---|---|---|---|
| 1 | Metallurg Krasnoyarsk (A) | 34 | 23 | 4 | 7 | 64 | 27 | +37 | 73 | Promotion to First League |
| 2 | Dynamo Barnaul | 34 | 21 | 7 | 6 | 55 | 27 | +28 | 70 | |
| 3 | Kuzbass Kemerovo | 34 | 21 | 3 | 10 | 56 | 27 | +29 | 66 | |
| 4 | Metallurg-ZapSib Novokuznetsk (Note: FC Metallurg Novokuznetsk renamed to FC Metallurg-ZapSib.) | 34 | 21 | 3 | 10 | 77 | 37 | +40 | 66 | |
| 5 | Amur Blagoveshchensk | 34 | 19 | 4 | 11 | 66 | 35 | +31 | 61 (Note: FC Amur Blagoveshchensk awarded 4 home wins.) | |
| 6 | Irtysh Tobolsk | 34 | 18 | 2 | 14 | 53 | 49 | +4 | 56 | |
| 7 | Sakhalin Kholmsk (Note: FC Sakhalin Kholmsk and FC Dynamo Yakutsk did not participate in any national-level competitions in 1996.) (R) | 34 | 16 | 6 | 12 | 51 | 53 | −2 | 54 (Note: FC Sakhalin Kholmsk and FC Samotlor-XXI Nizhnevartovsk awarded 1 home win each.) | Relegation to Third League |
| 8 | Tom Tomsk | 34 | 15 | 8 | 11 | 54 | 25 | +29 | 53 | |
| 9 | Selenga Ulan-Ude (Note: FC Kristall Neryungri moved to Ulan-Ude and renamed to FC Selenga.) | 34 | 16 | 3 | 15 | 42 | 46 | −4 | 51 | |
| 10 | Motor Prokopyevsk | 34 | 14 | 9 | 11 | 34 | 40 | −6 | 51 | |
| 11 | Dynamo Omsk | 34 | 15 | 5 | 14 | 48 | 39 | +9 | 50 | |
| 12 | Dynamo Yakutsk (R) | 34 | 13 | 6 | 15 | 47 | 59 | −12 | 45 (Note: FC Dynamo Yakutsk awarded 2 home wins.) | Relegation to Third League |
| 13 | Viktoriya Nazarovo (Note: FC Viktoriya Nazarovo promoted from the Amateur Football League.) | 34 | 13 | 5 | 16 | 54 | 40 | +14 | 44 | |
| 14 | SKA Khabarovsk | 34 | 11 | 5 | 18 | 36 | 46 | −10 | 38 | |
| 15 | Torpedo Rubtsovsk | 34 | 10 | 6 | 18 | 48 | 57 | −9 | 36 | |
| 16 | Angara Angarsk | 34 | 8 | 6 | 20 | 37 | 81 | −44 | 30 | |
| 17 | Samotlor-XXI Nizhnevartovsk | 34 | 4 | 4 | 26 | 12 | 81 | −69 | 16 | |
| 18 | Mezhdurechensk (Note: FC Mezhdurechensk promoted from the Amateur Football League, where it played in 1994 as FC Shakhtyor Mezhdurechensk.) | 34 | 3 | 4 | 27 | 20 | 85 | −65 | 13 | |

Source: RSSSF
(A) Advance to a further round; (R) Relegated

=== Top goalscorers ===
21 goals

- Sergei Chernov (FC Metallurg-ZapSib Novokuznetsk)

20 goals

- Stanislav Chaplygin (FC Metallurg-ZapSib Novokuznetsk)

19 goals

- Vadim Belokhonov (FC Metallurg Krasnoyarsk)

17 goals

- Anatoli Kisurin (FC Dynamo Omsk)
- Yevgeni Zarva (FC Irtysh Tobolsk)

16 goals

- Viktor Kashko (FC Dynamo Yakutsk)
- Andrei Korovin (FC Amur Blagoveshchensk)

15 goals

- Vyacheslav Koloda (FC Dynamo Barnaul)

14 goals

- Sergei Ageyev (FC Viktoriya Nazarovo)

13 goals

- Ruslan Akhidzhak (FC Tom Tomsk)

== See also ==
- 1995 Russian Top League
- 1995 Russian First League
- 1995 Russian Third League
