= 1996 Russian Second League =

Football competition

Russian Second League
- Season: 1996

The 1996 Russian Second League was the fifth edition of Russian Second Division. There were 3 zones with 60 teams starting the competition (2 were excluded before the end of the season).

== Zone West ==
=== Overview ===
Team	Head coach
FC Metallurg Lipetsk	Valeri Tretyakov
FC Anzhi Makhachkala	Eduard Malofeyev
FC Torpedo Taganrog	Anatoly Bulgakov
FC Avtozapchast Baksan	Sergei Tashuev
FC MChS-Selyatino Selyatino	Leonid Nazarenko
FC Avtodor Vladikavkaz	Ruslan Sakiyev
FC Angusht Nazran	Timur Kuriyev
FC Lokomotiv Liski	Vladimir Ponomaryov
FC SKA Rostov-on-Don	Aleksandr Tumasyan
FC Volgar-Gazprom Astrakhan	Vladimir Yerofeyev
FC Volgodonsk	Valeri Zubakov
FC Kavkazkabel Prokhladny	Sergei Ponomaryov
FC Gatchina	Nikolai Gosudarenkov
FC Energiya Pyatigorsk	Sergei Razaryonov
FC Avangard Kursk	Aleksandr Galkin
FC Torpedo Armavir	Arkadi Afanasyev
FC Dynamo Vologda	Aleksandr Samygin
FC Olimp Kislovodsk	Yuri Kotov
FC Turbostroitel Kaluga	Mikhail Balabuyev
FC Dynamo St. Petersburg	Aleksandr Fyodorov
FC Kolos Krasnodar	Vladimir Inyutin
FC Iriston Vladikavkaz	Aleksandr Katsiyev

=== Standings ===
Pos	Team	Pld	W	D	L	GF	GA	GD	Pts	Promotion or relegation
1	Metallurg Lipetsk (A)	38	29	6	3	105	23	+82	93	Promotion to 1997 Russian First League
2	Anzhi Makhachkala (A)	38	28	3	7	99	36	+63	87 (Note: FC Anzhi Makhachkala awarded 1 home win.)	Promotion to 1997 Russian First League
3	Torpedo Taganrog	38	25	6	7	96	33	+63	81	
4	Avtozapchast Baksan	38	22	4	12	64	41	+23	70	
5	MChS-Selyatino Selyatino (Note: FC Moskovskiy-Selyatino renamed to FC MChS-Selyatino.)	38	21	5	12	76	49	+27	68	
6	Avtodor Vladikavkaz (Note: FC Avtodor-BMK Vladikavkaz renamed to FC Avtodor.)	38	20	8	10	66	48	+18	68	
7	Angusht Nazran (Note: FC Angusht Malgobek moved to Nazran.)	38	18	8	12	56	48	+8	62	
8	Lokomotiv Liski	38	17	6	15	53	57	−4	57	
9	SKA Rostov-on-Don	38	17	5	16	49	67	−18	56	
10	Volgar-Gazprom Astrakhan	38	15	7	16	50	62	−12	52	
11	Volgodonsk (R)	38	14	6	18	44	62	−18	48	Relegation to Third League
12	Kavkazkabel Prokhladny	38	13	7	18	33	45	−12	46	
13	Gatchina	38	12	10	16	45	46	−1	46	
14	Energiya Pyatigorsk	38	12	8	18	40	54	−14	44	
15	Avangard Kursk	38	13	4	21	50	78	−28	43	
16	Armavir	38	11	3	24	40	75	−35	36	
17	Dynamo Vologda	38	10	6	22	39	62	−23	36	
18	Olimp Kislovodsk (R)	38	10	8	20	38	60	−22	32 (Note: 6 points were deducted from FC Olimp Kislovodsk.)	Relegation to Third League
19	Turbostroitel Kaluga (Note: FC Turbostroitel Kaluga did not participate in any national-level competitions in 1997.) (R)	38	7	6	25	25	67	−42	21	Relegation to Third League
20	Dynamo St. Petersburg	38	3	10	25	26	81	−55	19	
–	Iriston Vladikavkaz	19	-	-	-	-	-	—	0 (Note: FC Iriston Vladikavkaz were excluded from the league after playing 19 games and gaining 25 points. All their results were discarded.)	
–	Kolos Krasnodar	18	-	-	-	-	-	—	0 (Note: FC Kolos Krasnodar were excluded from the league after playing 18 games and gaining 20 points. All their results were discarded. Kolos did not participate in any national-level competitions in 1997.)	

Source: RSSSF
(A) Advance to a further round; (R) Relegated

=== Top goalscorers ===
33 goals

- (Azerbaijan) Ibragim Gasanbekov (FC Anzhi Makhachkala)

31 goals

- Vitali Yermilov (FC Torpedo Taganrog)

29 goals

- Sergei Lavrentyev (FC MChS-Selyatino Selyatino)

25 goals

- Igor Lyakhov (FC Metallurg Lipetsk)

23 goals

- Sergei Polstyanov (FC Metallurg Lipetsk)

17 goals

- Vladimir Kharin (FC Lokomotiv Liski)

16 goals

- Aleksandr Zhidkov (FC Metallurg Lipetsk)

15 goals

- Andrei Bakalets (FC MChS-Selyatino Selyatino)

14 goals

- Vladimir Ivanov (FC Gatchina)

13 goals

- Isa Markhiyev (FC Angusht Nazran)

== Zone Centre ==
=== Overview ===
Team	Head coach
FC Lada Dimitrovgrad	Vladimir Yevsyukov
FC CSK VVS-Kristall Smolensk	Lev Platonov
FC Amkar Perm	Sergei Oborin
FC Arsenal Tula	Gennadi Kostylev (until September)
FC Spartak Ryazan	Sergei Nedosekin
FC Rubin Kazan	Igor Volchok
FC Don Novomoskovsk	Leonid Lipovoy
FC Nosta Novotroitsk	Valeri Shaveyko
FC UralAZ Miass	Valeri Znarok
FC Svetotekhnika Saransk	Aleksandr Korolyov
FC Tekstilshchik Ivanovo	Vladimir Belkov
FC Torpedo Pavlovo	Vyacheslav Melnikov
FC Sibir Kurgan	Vladimir Petrov
FC Energiya Chaikovsky	Sergei Kleymyonov
FC Metallurg Magnitogorsk	Igor Kasyuk
FC Spartak Shchyolkovo	Sergei Suslin
FC Zavodchanin Saratov	Anatoli Smal
FC Kosmos Dolgoprudny	Aleksandr Logunov
FC Zenit Izhevsk	Leonid Garyayev
FC Zenit Penza	Aleksandr Komissarov
FC Asmaral Moscow	Vladimir Mikhaylov
FC Industriya Borovsk	Yuri Karamyan

=== Standings ===
Pos	Team	Pld	W	D	L	GF	GA	GD	Pts	Promotion or relegation
1	Lada Dimitrovgrad (A)	42	31	5	6	90	28	+62	98	Promotion to 1997 Russian First League
2	CSK VVS-Kristall Smolensk (A)	42	30	6	6	96	36	+60	96	Promotion to 1997 Russian First League
3	Amkar Perm	42	28	9	5	86	31	+55	93	
4	Arsenal Tula	42	29	5	8	79	36	+43	92	
5	Spartak Ryazan	42	28	6	8	67	24	+43	90	
6	Rubin Kazan	42	24	7	11	66	34	+32	79	
7	Don Novomoskovsk	42	24	6	12	60	31	+29	78	
8	Nosta Novotroitsk	42	22	10	10	84	46	+38	76	
9	UralAZ Miass	42	18	13	11	60	56	+4	67	
10	Svetotekhnika Saransk	42	16	12	14	53	49	+4	60	
11	Tekstilshchik Ivanovo	42	18	3	21	65	60	+5	57	
12	Torpedo Pavlovo	42	14	9	19	44	57	−13	51 (Note: FC Torpedo Pavlovo awarded 1 home win.)	
13	Sibir Kurgan	42	13	7	22	34	55	−21	46	
14	Energiya Chaikovsky	42	13	5	24	54	68	−14	44	
15	Metallurg Magnitogorsk	42	13	3	26	59	103	−44	42	
16	Spartak Shchyolkovo	42	12	6	24	39	60	−21	42	
17	Zavodchanin Saratov (Note: FC Zavodchanin Saratov did not participate in any national-level competitions in 1997.) (R)	42	9	15	18	43	54	−11	42	Relegation to Third League
18	Kosmos Dolgoprudny (R)	42	11	4	27	39	83	−44	37	Relegation to Third League
19	Zenit Izhevsk	42	9	8	25	37	79	−42	35	
20	Zenit Penza (R)	42	8	10	24	31	58	−27	34	Relegation to Third League
21	Asmaral Moscow (R)	42	8	4	30	33	92	−59	28 (Note: FC Asmaral Moscow awarded 1 home loss.)	Relegation to Third League
22	Industriya Borovsk (R)	42	7	1	34	27	106	−79	22	Relegation to Third League

Source: RSSSF
(A) Advance to a further round; (R) Relegated

=== Top goalscorers ===
34 goals

- Konstantin Paramonov (FC Amkar Perm)

30 goals

- Valeri Solyanik (FC CSK VVS-Kristall Smolensk)

27 goals

- Aleksandr Kuzmichyov (FC Arsenal Tula)

25 goals

- Aleksei Chernov (FC Lada Dimitrovgrad)

24 goals

- Andrei Knyazev (FC Metallurg Magnitogorsk)

21 goals

- Oleg Nechayev (FC Lada Dimitrovgrad)

20 goals

- Vladimir Pantyushenko (FC Rubin Kazan)

19 goals

- Oleg Sinelobov (FC Nosta Novotroitsk)

17 goals

- (Armenia) Armen Adamyan (FC CSK VVS-Kristall Smolensk)

16 goals

- Igor Palachyov (FC Nosta Novotroitsk)
- Aleksandr Zaikin (FC Lada Dimitrovgrad)

== Zone East ==
=== Overview ===
Team	Head coach
FC Irtysh Omsk	Aleksandr Ivchenko
FC Tom Tomsk	Vladimir Yurin
FC Viktoriya Nazarovo	Mikhail Putintsev
FC Metallurg-ZapSib Novokuznetsk	Vladislav Sosnov
FC SKA Khabarovsk	Vladimir Susin
FC Kuzbass Kemerovo	Viktor Shel
FC Irtysh Tobolsk	Rudolf Atamalyan
FC Samotlor-XXI Nizhnevartovsk	Aleksandr Shudrik
FC Dynamo Omsk	Vyacheslav Martynov
FC Dynamo Barnaul	Aleksandr Gostenin
FC Amur Blagoveshchensk	Ivan Nikolayev
FC Selenga Ulan-Ude	Valeri Mikhnov
FC Angara Angarsk	Ivan Korzhenko
FC Motor Prokopyevsk	Vitali Golopolosov
FC Torpedo Rubtsovsk	Vladimir Vorzhev
FC Mezhdurechensk	Viktor Kolmogorov

=== Standings ===
Pos	Team	Pld	W	D	L	GF	GA	GD	Pts	Promotion or relegation
1	Irtysh Omsk (A)	30	22	3	5	59	17	+42	69	Promotion to 1997 Russian First League
2	Tom Tomsk	30	19	6	5	48	24	+24	63	
3	Viktoriya Nazarovo	30	18	2	10	54	37	+17	56	
4	Metallurg-ZapSib Novokuznetsk	30	17	5	8	56	34	+22	56	
5	SKA Khabarovsk	30	16	6	8	48	30	+18	54	
6	Kuzbass Kemerovo	30	14	6	10	51	24	+27	48	
7	Irtysh Tobolsk	30	14	4	12	36	32	+4	46	
8	Samotlor-XXI Nizhnevartovsk	30	13	6	11	29	28	+1	45	
9	Dynamo Omsk	30	13	3	14	39	44	−5	42	
10	Dynamo Barnaul	30	12	6	12	36	24	+12	42	
11	Amur Blagoveshchensk	30	12	6	12	36	36	0	42	
12	Selenga Ulan-Ude	30	12	5	13	29	46	−17	41	
13	Angara Angarsk	30	6	3	21	29	71	−42	21	
14	Motor Prokopyevsk (R)	30	4	8	18	24	51	−27	20	Relegation to Amateur Football League
15	Torpedo Rubtsovsk	30	5	3	22	24	52	−28	18	
16	Mezhdurechensk	30	4	6	20	21	69	−48	18	

Source: RSSSF
(A) Advance to a further round; (R) Relegated

=== Top goalscorers ===
22 goals

- Marat Mulashev (FC Irtysh Omsk)

18 goals

- Sergei Ageyev (FC Viktoriya Nazarovo)

16 goals

- Anatoli Kisurin (FC Dynamo Omsk)

14 goals

- Sergei Rogalevskiy (FC Kuzbass Kemerovo)

13 goals

- Sergei Shaporenko (FC Irtysh Omsk)

11 goals

- Aleksandr Bogatyryov (FC Viktoriya Nazarovo)
- Yevgeni Savin (FC Dynamo Barnaul)

10 goals

- Maksim Shvetsov (FC SKA Khabarovsk)

9 goals

- Stanislav Achkasov (FC Kuzbass Kemerovo)
- Ruslan Akhidzhak (FC Tom Tomsk)
- Stanislav Chaplygin (FC Metallurg-ZapSib Novokuznetsk)
- (Belarus) Yury Khadaronak (FC Samotlor-XXI Nizhnevartovsk)
- Sergei Kondratskiy (FC Irtysh Omsk)
- Konstantin Orlov (FC Metallurg-ZapSib Novokuznetsk)
- Vitali Razdrogin (FC Irtysh Omsk)
- Viktor Sebelev (FC Tom Tomsk)
- Taras Shulga (FC SKA Khabarovsk)

== See also ==
- 1996 Russian Top League
- 1996 Russian First League
- 1996 Russian Third League
