= 1997 Russian Second League =

Russian Second League
- Season: 1997

The 1997 Russian Second League was the sixth edition of the Second Division. There were 3 zones with 61 teams starting the competition (3 were excluded before the end of the season). This was the last season that the professional Russian Third League existed. Next season the Second League became the lowest professional level once again.

== Zone West ==
=== Overview ===
Team	Head coach
FC Arsenal Tula	(Ukraine) Yevhen Kucherevskyi
FC Lokomotiv Liski	Vladimir Ponomaryov
FC Salyut-YuKOS Belgorod	Aleksandr Kryukov
FC Volgar-Gazprom Astrakhan	Boris Bashkin
FC Spartak Tambov	Vladimir Kovylin
FC Torpedo Taganrog	Anatoly Bulgakov
FC Avtodor Vladikavkaz	Ruslan Sakiyev
FC Avtozapchast Baksan	Sergei Tashuev
FC Avtomobilist Noginsk	Vladimir Bodrov
FC Kavkazkabel Prokhladny	Boris Kayushnikov
FC Angusht Nazran	Timur Kuriyev
FC Dynamo Vologda	Leon Yagubyants
FC MChS-Selyatino Selyatino	Leonid Nazarenko
FC Venets Gulkevichi	Viktor Zvyagin
FC Avangard Kursk	Aleksandr Galkin
FC Mosenergo Moscow	Valentin Sysoyev
FC Spartak Anapa	Igor Zazroyev
FC SKA Rostov-on-Don	Sergei Shvetsov
FC Torpedo Armavir	Nurbiy Khakunov
FC Energiya Pyatigorsk	Sergei Razaryonov
FC Gatchina	Nikolai Gosudarenkov
FC Dynamo-Zhemchuzhina-2 Sochi	Vladimir Aleynikov

=== Standings ===
Pos	Team	Pld	W	D	L	GF	GA	GD	Pts	Promotion or relegation
1	Arsenal Tula (A)	38	28	7	3	91	26	+65	91	Promotion to First Division
2	Lokomotiv Liski	38	23	7	8	64	31	+33	76	
3	Salyut-YuKOS Belgorod	38	22	3	13	72	51	+21	69	
4	Volgar-Gazprom Astrakhan	38	20	9	9	63	33	+30	69	
5	Spartak Tambov	38	21	5	12	66	50	+16	68	
6	Torpedo Taganrog	38	20	6	12	64	38	+26	66	
7	Avtodor Vladikavkaz	38	19	5	14	64	50	+14	62	
8	Avtozapchast Baksan (Note: FC Avtozapchast Baksan did not play on national level in 1998.) (R)	38	17	11	10	52	39	+13	62	Relegation to Amateur Football League
9	Avtomobilist Noginsk	38	16	12	10	70	53	+17	60	
10	Kavkazkabel Prokhladny	38	15	11	12	43	33	+10	56	
11	Angusht Nazran	38	15	9	14	39	44	−5	54	
12	Dynamo Vologda	38	14	8	16	44	51	−7	50	
13	MChS-Selyatino Selyatino	38	14	7	17	59	63	−4	49	
14	Venets Gulkevichi	38	10	11	17	36	51	−15	41	
15	Avangard Kursk	38	11	7	20	40	58	−18	40	
16	Mosenergo Moscow	38	9	12	17	41	57	−16	39	
17	Spartak Anapa	38	11	4	23	44	76	−32	37	
18	SKA Rostov-on-Don (R)	38	9	6	23	38	75	−37	33	Relegation to Amateur Football League
19	Armavir	38	8	7	23	32	66	−34	31	
20	Energiya Pyatigorsk (R)	38	4	1	33	18	95	−77	13 (Note: FC Energiya Pyatigorsk was excluded from the league after playing 22 games and gaining 13 points (it also won a game against FC Gatchina, who were excluded from the league earlier). All the remaining games were awarded to the opponents with a score of 3-0.)	Relegation to Amateur Football League
–	Gatchina (Note: FC Gatchina was excluded from the league after playing 16 games and gaining 18 points. All their results were discarded. They did not play on national level in 1998.)	16	-	-	-	-	-	—	0	
–	Dynamo-Zhemchuzhina-2 Sochi (Note: FC Dynamo-Zhemchuzhina-2 Sochi was excluded from the league after playing 7 games and gaining 3 points. All their results were discarded. They did not play on national level in 1998.)	7	-	-	-	-	-	—	0	

Source: RSSSF
(A) Advance to a further round; (R) Relegated

=== Top goalscorers ===
33 goals

- Aleksandr Kuzmichyov (FC Arsenal Tula)

32 goals

- Dmitri Kirichenko (FC Torpedo Taganrog)

26 goals

- Vladimir Kharin (FC Lokomotiv Liski)

21 goals

- Andrei Bakalets (FC MChS-Selyatino Selyatino)

16 goals

- Oleg Delov (FC Avangard Kursk)

14 goals

- (Brazil) Anderson (FC Arsenal Tula)
- Anatoli Balaluyev (FC Avtomobilist Noginsk)
- Alik Dulayev (FC Avtodor Vladikavkaz)
- Grigori Ivanov (FC Avtodor Vladikavkaz)
- Mikhail Shumilin (FC MChS-Selyatino Selyatino)

== Zone Center ==
=== Overview ===
Team	Head coach
FC Rubin Kazan	Igor Volchok
FC Amkar Perm	Sergei Oborin
FC Spartak Ryazan	Sergei Nedosekin
FC Energiya Chaikovsky	Sergei Kleymyonov
FC Nosta Novotroitsk	Aleksandr Salnov
FC Torpedo Arzamas	Valeri Sinau (until July); Vladimir Inyutin (from August)
FC UralAZ Miass	Pyotr Nagayev
FC Don Novomoskovsk	Igor Solovyov
FC Torpedo Pavlovo	Aleksandr Sarafannikov
FC Volga Ulyanovsk	Aleksandr Korolyov
FC Volga Tver	Yuri Zubkov
FC Oryol	Vladimir Brykin
FC Tekstilshchik Ivanovo	Vladimir Belkov
FC Sodovik Sterlitamak	Sergei Maksimov
FC Svetotekhnika Saransk	Vladimir Bibikov
FC Spartak-Orekhovo Orekhovo-Zuyevo	Leonid Ostroushko
FC Magnitka Magnitogorsk	Viktor Sokolovskiy
FC Dynamo Saint Petersburg	Mark Rubin
FC Spartak Shchyolkovo	Aleksandr Leksin
FC Sibir Kurgan	Igor Kuznetsov
FC Zenit Izhevsk	Stanislav Korotayev

=== Standings ===
Pos	Team	Pld	W	D	L	GF	GA	GD	Pts	Promotion
1	Rubin Kazan (A)	40	32	6	2	88	22	+66	102	Promotion to First Division
2	Amkar Perm	40	24	11	5	69	21	+48	83	
3	Spartak Ryazan	40	24	8	8	59	22	+37	80	
4	Energiya Chaikovsky	40	22	10	8	79	43	+36	76	
5	Nosta Novotroitsk	40	18	12	10	66	49	+17	66	
6	Torpedo Arzamas	40	18	8	14	58	44	+14	62	
7	UralAZ Miass	40	17	11	12	57	42	+15	62	
8	Don Novomoskovsk	40	17	10	13	46	45	+1	61	
9	Torpedo Pavlovo	40	15	14	11	49	36	+13	59	
10	Volga Ulyanovsk	40	16	9	15	40	37	+3	57	
11	Volga Tver	40	15	11	14	40	45	−5	56	
12	Oryol	40	14	14	12	50	40	+10	56	
13	Tekstilshchik Ivanovo	40	14	6	20	42	60	−18	48	
14	Sodovik Sterlitamak	40	12	10	18	45	60	−15	46	
15	Svetotekhnika Saransk	40	12	9	19	64	69	−5	45	
16	Spartak-Orekhovo Orekhovo-Zuyevo (Note: FC Orekhovo Orekhovo-Zuyevo renamed to FC Spartak-Orekhovo.)	40	12	9	19	42	63	−21	45	
17	Magnitka Magnitogorsk (Note: FC Metallurg Magnitogorsk renamed to FC Magnitka.)	40	11	9	20	45	69	−24	42	
18	Dynamo St. Petersburg	40	8	10	22	38	69	−31	34	
19	Spartak Shchyolkovo	40	5	15	20	29	56	−27	30	
20	Sibir Kurgan	40	7	7	26	34	78	−44	28	
21	Zenit Izhevsk	40	5	5	30	38	108	−70	20	

Source: RSSSF
Rules for classification: No teams were relegated from this zone.
(A) Advance to a further round

=== Top goalscorers ===
26 goals

- Eduard Zatsepin (FC Svetotekhnika Saransk)

25 goals

- Andrei Knyazev (FC Rubin Kazan)

22 goals

- Vladimir Filimonov (FC Energiya Chaikovsky)

19 goals

- (Ukraine) Yuriy Yakovenko (FC Torpedo Arzamas)

17 goals

- Sergei Budarin (FC Nosta Novotroitsk)

16 goals

- Vladimir Pantyushenko (FC Rubin Kazan)

14 goals

- Vitali Papadopulo (FC Torpedo Arzamas)
- Konstantin Paramonov (FC Amkar Perm)

13 goals

- Aleksandr Katasonov (FC Amkar Perm)
- Andrei Minvaliyev (FC Tekstilshchik Ivanovo)

== Zone East ==
=== Overview ===
Team	Head coach
FC Tom Tomsk	Vladimir Yurin
FC Samotlor-XXI Nizhnevartovsk	Sergei Iromashvili
FC SKA Khabarovsk	Vladimir Susin
FC Zvezda Irkutsk	Sergei Muratov
FC Dynamo Barnaul	Aleksandr Gostenin
FC Chkalovets Novosibirsk	Valeri Yerkovich
FC Irtysh Tobolsk	Rudolf Atamalyan
FC Kuzbass Kemerovo	Viktor Shel
FC Dynamo Omsk	Artyom Amirdzhanov
FC Viktoriya Nazarovo	Mikhail Putintsev
FC Amur-Energiya Blagoveshchensk	Vyacheslav Kurtsayev
FC Metallurg Krasnoyarsk	Yuri Sipkin
FC Metallurg-ZapSib Novokuznetsk	Vitali Golopolosov
FC Angara Angarsk	Ivan Korzhenko
FC Selenga Ulan-Ude	Valeri Mikhnov
FC Torpedo Rubtsovsk	Vladimir Vorzhev
FC Okean Nakhodka	Pavel Palatin
FC Mezhdurechensk	Viktor Kolmogorov

=== Standings ===
Pos	Team	Pld	W	D	L	GF	GA	GD	Pts	Promotion or relegation
1	Tom Tomsk (A)	34	26	5	3	82	20	+62	83	Promotion to First Division
2	Samotlor-XXI Nizhnevartovsk	34	20	8	6	53	25	+28	68	
3	SKA Khabarovsk	34	19	8	7	52	22	+30	65	
4	Zvezda Irkutsk	34	18	8	8	44	27	+17	62	
5	Dynamo Barnaul	34	17	6	11	51	35	+16	57	
6	Chkalovets Novosibirsk	34	16	8	10	46	32	+14	56	
7	Irtysh Tobolsk	34	15	9	10	51	32	+19	54	
8	Kuzbass Kemerovo	34	14	9	11	39	34	+5	51	
9	Dynamo Omsk	34	16	2	16	38	40	−2	50	
10	Viktoriya Nazarovo	34	15	5	14	46	45	+1	50	
11	Amur-Energiya Blagoveshchensk (Note: FC Amur Blagoveshchensk renamed to FC Amur-Energiya.)	34	14	4	16	55	54	+1	46	
12	Metallurg Krasnoyarsk	34	11	11	12	38	39	−1	44	
13	Metallurg-ZapSib Novokuznetsk	34	11	9	14	55	46	+9	42	
14	Angara Angarsk (R)	34	10	5	19	33	56	−23	35	Relegation to Amateur Football League
15	Selenga Ulan-Ude	34	8	4	22	30	68	−38	28	
16	Torpedo Rubtsovsk	34	6	7	21	19	63	−44	25	
17	Okean Nakhodka	34	6	5	23	27	84	−57	23	
18	Mezhdurechensk	34	5	5	24	27	64	−37	20	

Source: RSSSF
(A) Advance to a further round; (R) Relegated

=== Top goalscorers ===
21 goals

- Aleksandr Yarkin (FC Viktoriya Nazarovo)

16 goals

- Vadim Belokhonov (FC Metallurg Krasnoyarsk)

15 goals

- Stanislav Chaplygin (FC Metallurg-Zapsib Novokuznetsk)
- Andrei Korovin (FC Amur-Energiya Blagoveshchensk)

14 goals

- Yevgeni Savin (FC Dynamo Barnaul)

13 goals

- Aleksei Kandalintsev (FC SKA Khabarovsk)
- Dmitri Kudinov (FC Tom Tomsk)

12 goals

- Sergei Ageyev (FC Tom Tomsk)
- Vyacheslav Vishnevskiy (FC Tom Tomsk)

11 goals

- Vyacheslav Fomin (FC Irtysh Tobolsk)
- Anatoli Kisurin (FC Dynamo Omsk)
- Anatoli Panchenko (FC Dynamo Barnaul)
- Sergei Rogalevskiy (FC Kuzbass Kemerovo)
- Yevgeni Sadovnikov (FC Zvezda Irkutsk)
- Igor Zykov (FC Selenga Ulan-Ude)

== See also ==
- 1997 Russian Top League
- 1997 Russian First League
- 1997 Russian Third League
