= 1994 Russian Second League =

Russian Second League
- Season: 1994

The 1994 Russian Second League was the third edition of Russian Second Division. There were 4 zones with 62 teams starting the competition in total (5 of them were excluded before the end of the season).

== Zone West ==
=== Overview ===
Team	Head coach
FC Fakel Voronezh	Sergei Savchenkov
FC Kolos Krasnodar	Aleksandr Ploshnik (until September); Fyodor Novikov (from October)
PFC Spartak Nalchik	Yuri Naurzokov
FC Tekstilshchik Ivanovo	Vladimir Belkov
FC Spartak Anapa	Aleksandr Averyanov (until May); Akop Kalandzhan (from June)
FC Kuban Krasnodar	Leonid Nazarenko
FC Metallurg Lipetsk	Boris Streltsov
FC Lokomotiv St. Petersburg	Lev Burchalkin (until October)
FC Torpedo Taganrog	Vladimir Novik (until May); Anatoly Bulgakov (from May)
FC Anzhi Makhachkala	Akhmed Aleskerov (until June); Rafael Safarov (from June)
FC Vympel Rybinsk	Vladimir Bubnov
FC Kavkazkabel Prokhladny	Sergei Ponomaryov
FC Salyut Belgorod	Aleksandr Kryukov (until July); Anatoli Bogdanov (from July)
FC Trion-Volga Tver	Andrei Sergeyev
FC Dynamo Vologda	Vadim Ivanov (until May); Vladimir Pavlenko (from May)
FC Avangard-Kortek Kolomna	Mark Tunis
FC Iriston Vladikavkaz	Aleksandr Katsiyev
FC Venets Gulkevichi	Anatoli Lyz
FC Orekhovo Orekhovo-Zuyevo	Vladimir Yermichev (until May); Yuri Karamyan (from May)
FC Dynamo Makhachkala	Kamach Kabayev
FC Terek Grozny	Anatoli Mikheyev
FC Erzi Petrozavodsk	Vladimir Pronin (until May); Anatoli Zinchenko (May to July)

=== Standings ===
Pos	Team	Pld	W	D	L	GF	GA	GD	Pts	Promotion or relegation
1	Fakel Voronezh (A)	40	28	6	6	89	25	+64	62	Promotion to First League
2	Kolos Krasnodar (A)	40	29	3	8	105	47	+58	61	Promotion to First League
3	Spartak Nalchik	40	28	3	9	98	33	+65	59	
4	Tekstilshchik Ivanovo	40	26	7	7	93	42	+51	59	
5	Spartak Anapa	40	23	8	9	71	37	+34	54 (Note: FC Spartak Anapa and FC Iriston Vladikavkaz were each awarded 1 home win when opponents did not arrive for the game.)	
6	Kuban Krasnodar	40	23	6	11	83	44	+39	52	
7	Metallurg Lipetsk	40	22	5	13	63	49	+14	49	
8	Lokomotiv St. Petersburg	40	19	9	12	53	35	+18	47	
9	Torpedo Taganrog	40	18	11	11	53	40	+13	47	
10	Anzhi Makhachkala	40	19	5	16	57	41	+16	43 (Note: FC Anzhi Makhachkala were awarded 5 home wins when opponents did not arrive for the game.)	
11	Vympel Rybinsk	40	14	8	18	44	46	−2	36	
12	Kavkazkabel Prokhladny	40	14	7	19	46	70	−24	35	
13	Salyut Belgorod	40	13	8	19	42	52	−10	34 (Note: FC Salyut Belgorod were awarded 3 home losses without a game played.)	
14	Trion-Volga Tver	40	13	6	21	40	70	−30	32	
15	Dynamo Vologda	40	8	13	19	38	64	−26	29	
16	Avangard-Kortek Kolomna (Note: FC Viktor-Avangard Kolomna renamed to FC Avangard-Kortek Kolomna.)	40	11	6	23	38	69	−31	28	
17	Iriston Vladikavkaz	40	10	7	23	42	73	−31	27	
18	Venets Gulkevichi	40	9	7	24	35	76	−41	25	
19	Orekhovo Orekhovo-Zuyevo	40	7	7	26	32	78	−46	21	
20	Dynamo Makhachkala (R)	40	9	1	30	29	99	−70	19 (Note: FC Dynamo Makhachkala was excluded from the league after playing 19 games. The opponents were awarded a win in the remaining games.)	Relegation to Third League
21	Terek Grozny (R)	40	7	5	28	22	83	−61	19 (Note: FC Terek Grozny was excluded from the league after playing 21 games. The opponents were awarded a win in the remaining games (except for game against Dynamo Makhachkala where both teams received a loss). Terek did not play professionally in 1995 due to First Chechen War.)	Relegation to Third League
–	Erzi Petrozavodsk (Note: FC Erzi Petrozavodsk were excluded from the league after playing 16 games. All the results of their games were discarded. Erzi did not play professionally in 1995.)	16	–	–	–	–	–	—	0	

Source: RSSSF
(A) Advance to a further round; (R) Relegated

=== Top goalscorers ===
29 goals

- Aslan Goplachev (PFC Spartak Nalchik)
- Igor Tikhonov (FC Tekstilshchik Ivanovo)

24 goals

- (Belarus) Konstantin Kovalenko (FC Kolos Krasnodar)

22 goals

- Aleksandr Khalzov (FC Metallurg Lipetsk)
- Eduard Kugotov (PFC Spartak Nalchik)

19 goals

- Aleksandr Zernov (FC Tekstilshchik Ivanovo)

17 goals

- (Ukraine) Vladimir Zinich (FC Fakel Voronezh)

16 goals

- (Belarus) Ihar Fralow (FC Kolos Krasnodar)
- Aleksei Gerasimenko (FC Kuban Krasnodar)

15 goals

- Yuri Vostrukhin (FC Torpedo Taganrog)

== Zone Center ==
=== Overview ===
Team	Head coach
FC Torpedo Volzhsky	Oleg Dudarin
FC Torpedo Arzamas	Vladimir Dergach
FC Gazovik-Gazprom Izhevsk	Aleksandr Salnov
FC Torpedo Ryazan	Sergei Nedosekin
FC Metallurg Novotroitsk	Oleg Alemastsev
FC Lada Dimitrovgrad	Vladimir Yurin
FC Zvezda Gorodishche	Sergei Mukovnin
FC Uralets Nizhny Tagil	Igor Kuznetsov
FC Arsenal Tula	Aleksei Petrushin
FC Torpedo Miass	Viktor Lukashenko
FC Metallurg Magnitogorsk	Viktor Sokolovskiy
FC Svetotekhnika Saransk	Vladimir Solovyov
FC Devon Oktyabrsky	Viktor Khaydarov
FC Vyatka Kirov	Aleksandr Sokovnin
FC Rubin Kazan	Murat Zadikashvili
FC Obninsk	Boris Sinitsyn
FC Druzhba Yoshkar-Ola	Vladimir Petrov
FC Irgiz Balakovo	Vladimir Proskurin

=== Standings ===
Pos	Team	Pld	W	D	L	GF	GA	GD	Pts	Promotion or relegation
1	Torpedo Volzhsky (A)	32	23	4	5	84	28	+56	50 (Note: FC Torpedo Volzhsky and FC Zvezda Gorodishche were each awarded 2 home wins when opponents did not arrive for the game.)	Promotion to First League
2	Torpedo Arzamas (A)	32	23	2	7	60	31	+29	48	Promotion to First League
3	Gazovik-Gazprom Izhevsk (Note: FC Gazovik Izhevsk renamed to FC Gazovik-Gazprom Izhevsk.)	32	20	7	5	50	20	+30	47	
4	Torpedo Ryazan	32	16	11	5	43	24	+19	43	
5	Metallurg Novotroitsk	32	18	6	8	47	32	+15	42	
6	Lada Dimitrovgrad	32	17	6	9	41	25	+16	40 (Note: FC Lada Dimitrovgrad, FC Uralets Nizhny Tagil, FC Arsenal Tula and FC Devon Oktyabrsky were each awarded 1 home win when opponents did not arrive for the game.)	
7	Zvezda Gorodishche (Note: FC Zvezda-Rus Gorodishche renamed to FC Zvezda Gorodishche.)	32	16	5	11	61	41	+20	37	
8	Uralets Nizhny Tagil	32	16	5	11	49	34	+15	37	
9	Arsenal Tula	32	14	7	11	47	33	+14	35	
10	Torpedo Miass	32	13	6	13	25	28	−3	32	
11	Metallurg Magnitogorsk	32	9	10	13	41	54	−13	28	
12	Svetotekhnika Saransk	32	6	13	13	21	39	−18	25	
13	Devon Oktyabrsky	32	8	4	20	28	46	−18	20	
14	Vyatka Kirov (Note: FC Vyatka Kirov did not play professionally in 1995.) (R)	32	6	7	19	31	54	−23	19	Relegation to Third League
15	Rubin Kazan (Note: FC Rubin-TAN Kazan renamed to FC Rubin Kazan.)	32	6	4	22	15	65	−50	16	
16	Obninsk	32	4	7	21	21	62	−41	15	
17	Druzhba Yoshkar-Ola (R)	32	3	4	25	17	65	−48	10	Relegation to Third League
–	Irgiz Balakovo	8	–	–	–	–	–	—	0 (Note: FC Irgiz Balakovo was excluded from the league after playing 8 games (and gaining 5 points). All the results of their games were discarded. Irgiz did not play professionally in 1995.)	

Source: RSSSF
(A) Advance to a further round; (R) Relegated

=== Top goalscorers ===
20 goals

- Oleg Umurzakov (FC Torpedo Volzhsky)

16 goals

- Aleksei Chernov (FC Zvezda Gorodishche)
- Eduard Novozhilov (FC Torpedo Arzamas)

15 goals

- Sergei Budarin (FC Metallurg Novotroitsk)

14 goals

- Mikhail Belov (FC Torpedo Volzhsky)

13 goals

- Igor Syrov (FC Devon Oktyabrsky)

12 goals

- Robert Gay (FC Torpedo Miass)
- Andrei Knyazev (FC Metallurg Magnitogorsk)

11 goals

- Sergei Ilyushin (FC Torpedo Volzhsky)

10 goals

- Andrei Ivanov (FC Gazovik-Gazprom Izhevsk)
- Anatoli Kanishchev (FC Torpedo Arzamas)
- Igor Safonov (FC Metallurg Novotroitsk)

== Zone Siberia ==
=== Overview ===
Team	Head coach
FC Chkalovets Novosibirsk	Leonid Shevchenko
FC Tom Tomsk	Vladimir Pomeshchikov
FC Kuzbass Kemerovo	Sergei Bologov
FC Dynamo Barnaul	Stanislav Kaminskiy
FC Irtysh Tobolsk	Rudolf Atamalyan
FC Torpedo Rubtsovsk	Vladimir Vorzhev
FC Metallurg Novokuznetsk	Valeri Suldin
FC Dynamo Omsk	Anatoli Chikinskiy
FC Motor Prokopyevsk	Vitali Golopolosov
FC Samotlor-XXI Nizhnevartovsk	Yuri Kurnenin
FC Shakhtyor Kiselyovsk	Anatoli Kuznetsov
FC Politekhnik-92 Barnaul	Aleksandr Zakhryapin
FC Agan Raduzhny	Aleksandr Umrikhin

=== Standings ===
Pos	Team	Pld	W	D	L	GF	GA	GD	Pts	Qualification or relegation
1	Chkalovets Novosibirsk (A)	22	16	3	3	51	12	+39	35	Qualification to Promotion play-offs
2	Tom Tomsk	22	12	6	4	47	15	+32	30	
3	Kuzbass Kemerovo	22	13	3	6	38	19	+19	29	
4	Dynamo Barnaul	22	11	5	6	21	18	+3	27	
5	Irtysh Tobolsk (Note: FC Irtysh Tobolsk promoted from the Amateur Football League where it played in 1993 as FC Neftekhimik Tobolsk.)	22	10	6	6	32	23	+9	26 (Note: FC Irtysh Tobolsk and FC Samotlor-XXI Nizhnevartovsk were each awarded 1 home win when opponents did not arrive for the game.)	
6	Torpedo Rubtsovsk	22	9	7	6	31	30	+1	25	
7	Metallurg Novokuznetsk	22	7	7	8	29	28	+1	21	
8	Dynamo Omsk	22	8	3	11	31	39	−8	19	
9	Motor Prokopyevsk (Note: FC Motor Prokopyevsk promoted from the Amateur Football League.)	22	7	5	10	16	33	−17	19	
10	Samotlor-XXI Nizhnevartovsk (Note: FC Samotlor-XXI Nizhnevartovsk played their first professional season.)	22	6	5	11	17	29	−12	17	
11	Shakhtyor Kiselyovsk (Note: FC Shakhtyor Kiselyovsk and FC Politekhnik-92 Barnaul did not play professionally in 1995.) (R)	22	2	5	15	24	67	−43	9	Relegation to Third League
12	Politekhnik-92 Barnaul (R)	22	2	3	17	11	35	−24	7	Relegation to Third League
–	Agan Raduzhny (Note: FC Agan Raduzhny was excluded from the league after playing 3 games (and gaining no points). All the results of their games were discarded. Agan did not play professionally in 1995.)	3	–	–	–	–	–	—	0	

Source: RSSSF
(A) Advance to a further round; (R) Relegated

=== Top goalscorers ===
18 goals

- Ruslan Akhidzhak (FC Tom Tomsk)
- Anatoli Kisurin (FC Dynamo Omsk)

13 goals

- Sergei Chernov (FC Metallurg Novokuznetsk)

12 goals

- Oleg Nikulin (FC Chkalovets Novosibirsk)

11 goals

- Yevgeni Zarva (FC Irtysh Tobolsk)

9 goals

- Yevgeni Shipovskiy (FC Torpedo Rubtsovsk)
- Vladimir Tregub (FC Torpedo Rubtsovsk)

8 goals

- Andrei Bazankov (FC Kuzbass Kemerovo)
- Sergei Galkin (FC Chkalovets Novosibirsk)

7 goals

- Yevgeni Kultayev (FC Shakhtyor Kiselyovsk)
- Vladimir Makeyev (FC Chkalovets Novosibirsk)
- Viktor Sebelev (FC Tom Tomsk)

== Zone East ==
=== Overview ===
Team	Head coach
FC Dynamo Yakutsk	Anatoli Samkov
FC Angara Angarsk	Oleg Izmaylov
FC Sakhalin Kholmsk	Valeri Yerkovich
FC Metallurg Krasnoyarsk	Aleksandr Kishinyovskiy
FC Amur Blagoveshchensk	Rudolf Mkrtychev
FC SKA Khabarovsk	Vladimir Bychek
FC Kristall Neryungri	Viktor Kurlyuk
FC Avtomobilist Yuzhno-Sakhalinsk	Vyacheslav Mordasov
FC Amur Komsomolsk-na-Amure	Oleg Manzhukov

=== Standings ===
Pos	Team	Pld	W	D	L	GF	GA	GD	Pts	Qualification or relegation
1	Dynamo Yakutsk (A)	32	22	6	4	69	24	+45	50 (Note: FC Dynamo Yakutsk and FC Amur Blagoveshchensk were each awarded 2 home wins when opponents did not arrive for the game.)	Qualification to Promotion play-offs
2	Angara Angarsk	32	22	3	7	66	36	+30	47	
3	Sakhalin Kholmsk	32	20	4	8	87	38	+49	44	
4	Metallurg Krasnoyarsk	32	19	4	9	73	33	+40	42	
5	Amur Blagoveshchensk	32	13	6	13	46	53	−7	32	
6	SKA Khabarovsk	32	13	4	15	51	47	+4	30	
7	Kristall Neryungri (Note: FC Selenga Ulan-Ude moved to Neryungri and was renamed to FC Kristall Neryungri.)	32	9	3	20	33	58	−25	21	
8	Avtomobilist Yuzhno-Sakhalinsk (Note: FC Avtomobilist Yuzhno-Sakhalinsk promoted from the Amateur Football League. The team did not play professionally in 1995.) (R)	32	5	4	23	28	101	−73	14	Relegation to Third League
9	Amur Komsomolsk-na-Amure (Note: FC Amur Komsomolsk-na-Amure did not play professionally in 1995.) (R)	32	2	4	26	17	80	−63	8 (Note: FC Amur Komsomolsk-na-Amure was excluded from the league after playing 16 games. The opponents were awarded a win in the remaining games.)	Relegation to Third League

Source: RSSSF
(A) Advance to a further round; (R) Relegated

=== Top goalscorers ===
34 goals

- (Azerbaijan) Vladislav Kadyrov (FC Sakhalin Kholmsk)

21 goals

- Vadim Belokhonov (FC Metallurg Krasnoyarsk)

20 goals

- Andrei Korovin (FC SKA Khabarovsk)

19 goals

- Yuri Kuznetsov (FC Angara Angarsk)

13 goals

- Denis Laktionov (FC Sakhalin Kholmsk)

11 goals

- Vitali Fedenko (FC Metallurg Krasnoyarsk)
- Aleksandr Kharasakhal (FC Dynamo Yakutsk)
- Igor Khimushkin (FC Dynamo Yakutsk)
- Viktor Rybakov (FC Sakhalin Kholmsk)

10 goals

- Mikhail Semyonov (FC SKA Khabarovsk)

== Promotion playoffs ==
Winners of zones Siberia and East played a home-and-away series for promotion to the 1995 Russian First League.

FC Chkalovets Novosibirsk lost to FC Dynamo Yakutsk in Yakutsk 1:2, won 2:0 in Novosibirsk and were promoted on goal difference.

== See also ==
- 1994 Russian Top League
- 1994 Russian First League
- 1994 Russian Third League
