= Sergei Toporov =

Russian footballer and coach (1971–2024)

Personal information
- Full name: Sergei Yuryevich Toporov
- Date of birth: 2 January 1971
- Place of birth: Prokopyevsk, Kemerovo Oblast, Russian SFSR, USSR
- Date of death: 26 December 2024 (aged 53)
- Height: 1.79 m (5 ft 10 in)
- Positions: Forward; midfielder

Senior career*
Years	Team	Apps	(Gls)
1990–1997	FC Zarya Leninsk-Kuznetsky	263	(110)
1998	FC Irtysh Omsk	24	(5)
1999–2001	FC Gazovik-Gazprom Izhevsk	70	(15)
2001–2002	FC Irtysh Omsk	27	(5)
2003	FC Shakhtyor Prokopyevsk	6	(1)
2003–2004	FC Tobol Kurgan	23	(3)
2005	FC Zarya Leninsk-Kuznetsky	15	(2)

Managerial career
- 2010–2012: FC KUZBASS Kemerovo (assistant)
- 2012–2017: FC Raspadskaya Mezhdurechensk
- * Club domestic league appearances and goals

Sergei Yuryevich Toporov (Russian: Серге́й Юрьевич Топоров; 2 January 1971 – 26 December 2024) was a Russian professional football coach and a player.

== Career ==
Toporov played 8 seasons in the Russian Football National League for FC Zarya Leninsk-Kuznetsky, FC Irtysh Omsk and FC Gazovik-Gazprom Izhevsk.

== Death ==
He died on 26 December 2024, at the age of 53.

== Honours ==
- Russian Second Division Zone 6 top scorer: 1992 (22 goals).
