= Vainakh =

Vainakh or Vaynakh may refer to:

- Vainakh peoples
- Vainakh languages
- FC Vaynakh Shali
