= Balayev =

Balayev is a surname. Notable people with the surname include:

- Aydin Balayev (1956–2021), Azerbaijani historian
- Emil Balayev (born 1994), Russian footballer
- Maksim Balayev (born 1974), Russian footballer
- Rasim Balayev (1948–2026), Azerbaijani cinema and theatrical actor
