= Maslennikov =

Maslennikov (Russian: Масленников) (feminine: Maslennikova) is a surname. Notable people with the surname include:

- Aleksei Maslennikov (1929–2016), Russian tenor
- Igor Maslennikov (1931–2022), Russian film director
- Igor Maslennikov (footballer, born 2001), Russian professional football player
- Ivan Maslennikov (1900–1954), General of the Army, Soviet military and NKVD commander during World War II
- Margarita Maslennikova (1928–2021), Soviet cross-country skier
- Marianna Maslennikova (born 1961), Russian track and field athlete
- Oleg Maslennikov (born 1971), retired Russian professional footballer
- Sergey Maslennikov (born 1982), Russian Nordic combined skier who has competed since 2002
- Vera Nikolaevna Maslennikova (1926–2000), Russian mathematician

== See also ==
- Masļenki border incident
