= Yuri Vostrukhin =

Russian footballer

Personal information
- Full name: Yuri Nikolayevich Vostrukhin
- Date of birth: 12 May 1964 (age 62)
- Height: 1.72 m (5 ft 7 1/2 in)
- Position: Forward

Senior career*
Years	Team	Apps	(Gls)
1981–1982	FC Druzhba Maykop	9	(0)
1983	FC SKA Rostov-on-Don	0	(0)
1984	FC Torpedo Taganrog	16	(0)
1985	FC Terek Grozny	10	(4)
1988	FC Torpedo Kurgan	58	(17)
1989–1990	PFC Spartak Nalchik	22	(6)
1990	FC Volga Tver	13	(4)
1990	FC Volgar Astrakhan	12	(4)
1991–1992	FC Etalon Baksan	33	(22)
1992	FC SKA Rostov-on-Don	39	(46)
1993–1995	FC Torpedo Taganrog	82	(42)
1995	FC Metallurg Krasny Sulin	12	(5)
- * Club domestic league appearances and goals

Yuri Nikolayevich Vostrukhin (Russian: Юрий Николаевич Вострухин; born 12 May 1964) is a former Russian professional football player.

== Club career ==
He made his Russian Football National League debut for FC Torpedo Taganrog on 3 April 1993 in a game against FC Kuban Krasnodar.

== Honours ==
- Russian Second Division Zone 2 top scorer: 1992 (46 goals).
