= Yuri Kotov =

Russian football player and coach (1929–2022)

Personal information
- Full name: Yuri Kharlampiyevich Kotov
- Date of birth: 23 February 1929
- Place of birth: Pyatigorsk, North Caucasus Krai, Russian SFSR
- Date of death: 6 November 2022 (aged 93)
- Place of death: Stavropol, Russia

Senior career*
Years	Team	Apps	(Gls)
1953	Spartak Stavropol		
1954	Dynamo Stavropol		
1955	Spartak Stavropol		
1957	Trudovye Rezervy Stavropol		

Managerial career
- 1956: Spartak Stavropol
- 1957: Trudovye Rezervy Stavropol (assistant)
- 1958: Temp Makhachkala (assistant)
- 1960–1961: Spartak Stavropol (assistant)
- 1962–1963: Dynamo Stavropol (assistant)
- 1964–1965: Spartak Nalchik (assistant)
- 1966: Spartak Nalchik
- 1967–1968: Spartak Nalchik (assistant)
- 1968–1969: Avtomobilist Nalchik
- 1971–1972: Uralan Elista
- 1974: Mashuk Pyatigorsk
- 1975–1978: Dynamo Stavropol
- 1979–1981: Spartak Tambov
- 1984: Nart Cherkessk
- 1986: Spartak Tambov
- 1987: Lokomotiv Mineralnye Vody
- 1989: Lokomotiv Mineralnye Vody
- 1991: Etalon Baksan (assistant)
- 1992: Iskra Novoaleksandrovsk
- 1993: Kolos Krasnodar
- 1994: Tekhinvest-M Moskovsky
- 1995–1996: Olimp Kislovodsk
- 1997: Torpedo Georgiyevsk
- 1999: Signal Izobilny
- * Club domestic league appearances and goals

Yuri Kharlampiyevich Kotov (Russian: Юрий Харлампиевич Котов; 23 February 1929 – 6 November 2022) was a Russian professional football coach and player. He died on 6 November 2022, at the age of 93.
