= Vyacheslav Lyogkiy =

Azerbaijani footballer and coach (born 1946)

Personal information
- Full name: Vyacheslav Ivanovich Lyogkiy
- Date of birth: 10 August 1946 (age 80)
- Place of birth: Baku, Azerbaijani SSR
- Height: 1.74 m (5 ft 8 1/2 in)
- Positions: Defender; midfielder

Senior career*
Years	Team	Apps	(Gls)
1966–1968	Neftchi PFK	31	(1)
1970–1973	Neftchi PFK	79	(1)
1976	FC Dynamo Makhachkala	34	(0)

Managerial career
- 1977: FC Dynamo Makhachkala (assistant)
- 1981: FC Dynamo Makhachkala (assistant)
- 1992: FC Anzhi-2 Makhachkala
- 1993–1994: FC Anzhi Makhachkala (assistant)
- 1994: FC Anzhi Makhachkala
- 1995: FC Derbent
- * Club domestic league appearances and goals

Vyacheslav Ivanovich Lyogkiy (Russian: Вячеслав Иванович Лёгкий; born 10 August 1946 in Baku) is an Azerbaijani football coach and a former player.
