= Oleg Maslennikov =

Russian footballer

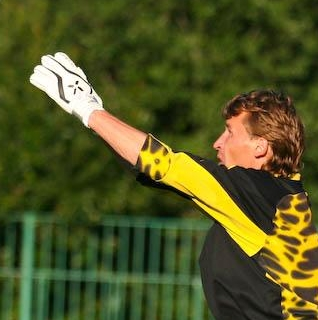
- Maslennikov in 2007

Personal information
- Full name: Oleg Borisovich Maslennikov
- Date of birth: 7 January 1971 (age 55)
- Place of birth: Vladimir, Russian SFSR
- Height: 1.95 m (6 ft 5 in)
- Position: Goalkeeper

Youth career
- FC Motor Vladimir

Senior career*
Years	Team	Apps	(Gls)
1986–1988	FC Motor Vladimir		
1989–1990	FC Torpedo Vladimir	3	(0)
1990	FC KamAZavtotsentr (amateur)		
1991	FC Metallurg Vyksa (amateur)		
1991	FC Neftyanik Uray (amateur)		
1992	FC Neftyanik Uray	1	(0)
1992–1997	FC Tyumen	129	(0)
1998–1999	FC Lokomotiv Nizhny Novgorod	7	(0)
2001–2002	FC Chkalovets-1936 Novosibirsk	30	(0)
2003	FC Luch-Energiya Vladivostok	17	(0)
2004	FC Sodovik Sterlitamak	6	(0)
2005	FC Lokomotiv-NN Nizhny Novgorod	12	(0)
2006	FC Zvezda Serpukhov	13	(0)
2007–2009	FC Torpedo Vladimir	22	(0)
- * Club domestic league appearances and goals

Oleg Borisovich Maslennikov (Russian: Олег Борисович Масленников; born 7 January 1971) is a former Russian professional footballer.

== Club career ==
He made his debut in the Russian Premier League in 1992 for FC Dynamo-Gazovik Tyumen.
