= FC Trestar Ostankino =

- Full name: Football Club Trestar Ostankino
- Founded: 1992
- Dissolved: 1993
- League: Russian Second Division, Zone 3
- 1992: 20th

FC Trestar Ostankino (Russian: «Трестар» (Останкино)) was a Russian football team from Ostankino, Dmitrovsky District, Moscow Oblast. It played professionally for a single season in the Russian Second Division in 1992.
