= Igor Kuzmenko =

Russian footballer

Personal information
- Full name: Igor Vladimirovich Kuzmenko
- Date of birth: 3 November 1970 (age 55)
- Height: 1.81 m (5 ft 11 1/2 in)
- Position: Forward

Senior career*
Years	Team	Apps	(Gls)
1989–1990	FC Khimik Belorechensk	41	(3)
1991	FC Kuban Krasnodar	37	(0)
1992–1996	FC Kolos Krasnodar	136	(56)
1997	FC Druzhba Maykop	15	(2)
1997	FC Laba Ust-Labinsk		
1998–2000	FC Dynamo Krasnodar		
- * Club domestic league appearances and goals

Igor Vladimirovich Kuzmenko (Russian: Игорь Владимирович Кузьменко; born 3 November 1970) is a former Russian professional football player.

== Club career ==
He played 3 seasons in the Russian Football National League for FC Kolos Krasnodar and FC Druzhba Maykop.

== Honours ==
- Russian Second Division Zone 1 top scorer: 1992 (35 goals).
