= Maksim Balayev =

Russian footballer

Personal information
- Full name: Maksim Alekseyevich Balayev
- Date of birth: 24 May 1974 (age 52)
- Height: 1.83 m (6 ft 0 in)
- Position: Forward

Youth career
- Svetlana St. Petersburg

Senior career*
Years	Team	Apps	(Gls)
1991–1994	FC Zenit St. Petersburg	39	(4)
1993–1994	→ FC Zenit-d St. Petersburg	20	(3)
1995–1996	FC Kavkazkabel Prokhladny	47	(17)
1996	FC Gatchina	1	(0)
- * Club domestic league appearances and goals

Maksim Alekseyevich Balayev (Russian: Максим Алексеевич Балаев; born 24 May 1974) is a Russian former football player.
