= Vladimir Kosogov =

Russian footballer and coach

Personal information
- Full name: Vladimir Petrovich Kosogov
- Date of birth: 26 January 1952 (age 74)
- Position: Goalkeeper

Senior career*
Years	Team	Apps	(Gls)
1970	FC SKA Khabarovsk		
1973	FC SKA Khabarovsk	2	(0)
1976–1979	FC Amur Blagoveshchensk		
1980	FC Angara Angarsk	25	(1)
1981	FC Zvezda Irkutsk	19	(1)
1982	FC Zvezda Perm	17	(0)
1986	FC Spartak Ryazan	12	(0)

Managerial career
- 1990–1992: FC Mashinostroitel Pskov
- 1998–2000: FC Energiya Velikiye Luki
- 2001–2003: FC BSK Spirovo
- 2004: FC Arsenal Tula (assistant)
- 2007–2009: FC Volochanin-Ratmir Vyshny Volochyok
- 2010: FC Pskov-747 Pskov
- * Club domestic league appearances and goals as of 1 January 2009

Vladimir Petrovich Kosogov (Russian: Владимир Петрович Косогов; born 26 January 1952) is a Russian professional football coach and a former player. In 2010, he managed FC Pskov-747 Pskov.
