= Anatoli Leshchenkov =

Russian footballer and coach

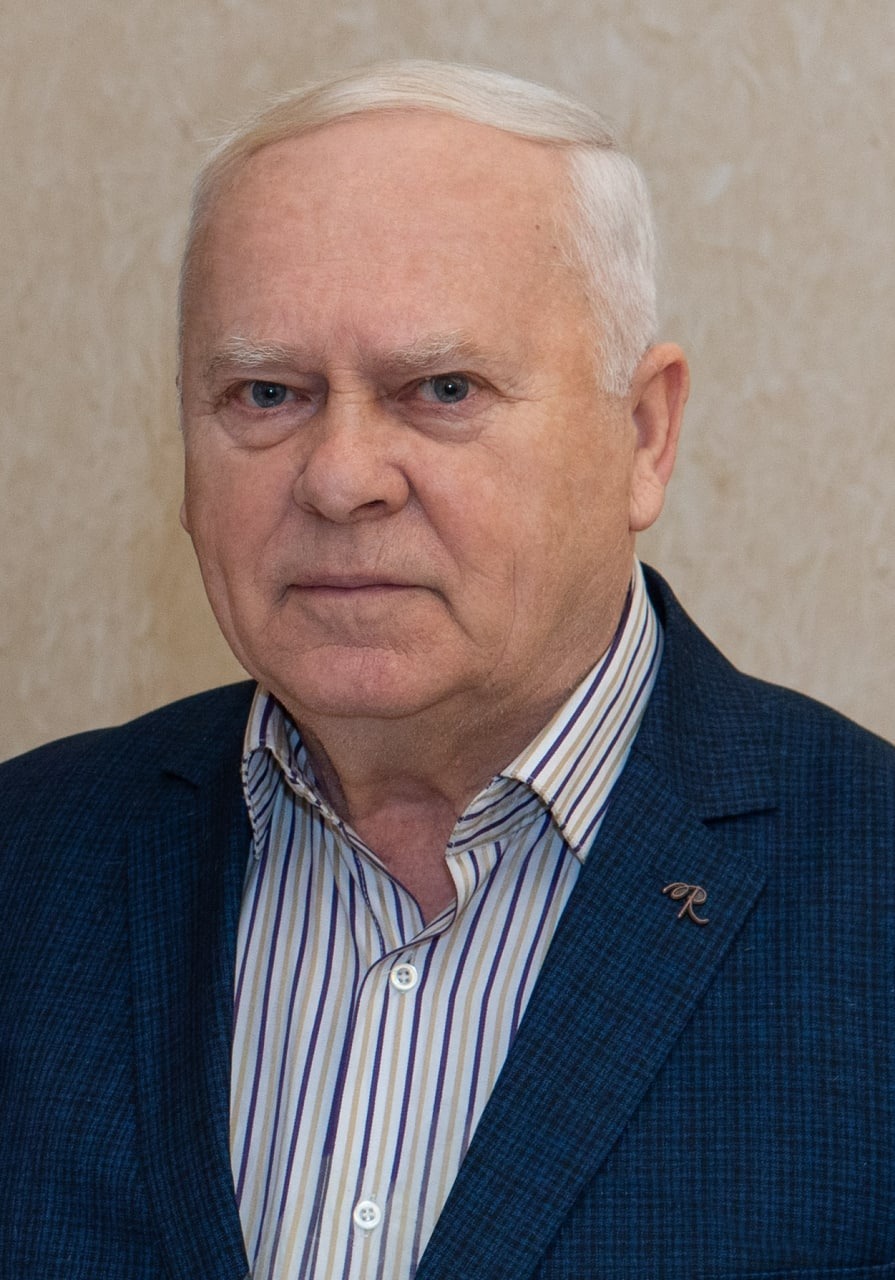

Personal information
- Full name: Anatoli Mikhailovich Leshchenkov
- Date of birth: November 11, 1946 (age 79)
- Position: Midfielder

Senior career*
| Years | Team | Apps | (Gls) |
| 1970 | FC Avanhard Ternopil | | |

Managerial career
- 1990–1997: FC Torgmash Lyubertsy
- 1998: FC Torgmash Lyubertsy
- 1998: FC Torgmash Lyubertsy
- * Club domestic league appearances and goals

Anatoli Mikhailovich Leshchenkov (Russian: Анатолий Михайлович Лещенков; born November 11, 1946) is a Russian professional football coach and a former player.
