= Mikhail Senyurin =

Russian footballer and coach

Personal information
- Full name: Mikhail Ivanovich Senyurin
- Date of birth: 24 November 1948 (age 77)
- Position: Forward

Senior career*
Years	Team	Apps	(Gls)
1968–1973	FC Volga Gorky		
1975–1976	FC Khimik Dzerzhinsk	69	(14)

Managerial career
- 1991: FC Khimik Dzerzhinsk (director)
- 1992–1996: FC Khimik Dzerzhinsk
- * Club domestic league appearances and goals

Mikhail Ivanovich Senyurin (Russian: Михаил Иванович Сенюрин; born 24 November 1948) is a Russian professional football coach and a former player.

Senyurin played in the Soviet First League with FC Volga Gorky.
