= Sergei Zimenkov =

Russian footballer

Personal information
- Full name: Sergei Anatolyevich Zimenkov
- Date of birth: 20 April 1952 (age 74)
- Height: 1.79 m (5 ft 10 1/2 in)
- Positions: Midfielder; striker

Senior career*
Years	Team	Apps	(Gls)
1971–1972	FC Lokomotyv Donetsk		
1972–1974	FC Dynamo Stavropol	86	(16)
1975	FC Traktor Pavlodar	33	(4)
1976–1977	FC Kairat	13	(2)
1977–1978	FC Shakhter Karagandy	43	(3)
1979–1982	FC Dynamo Stavropol	143	(30)

Managerial career
- 1983: FC Dynamo Stavropol (director)
- 1988–1989: FC Dynamo Stavropol (assistant)
- 1990–1991: FC Signal Izobilny
- 1993–1994: FC Dynamo Stavropol
- 1997: FC Dynamo Stavropol
- 2002: FC Zhemchuzhina Budyonnovsk
- 2006: FC Dynamo Stavropol
- 2009: FC Stavropolye-2009 (director of sports)
- 2010: FC Dynamo Stavropol (director of sports)
- 2010: FC Dynamo Stavropol (caretaker)
- * Club domestic league appearances and goals

Sergei Anatolyevich Zimenkov (Russian: Серге́й Анатольевич Зименков; born 20 April 1952) is a Russian professional football coach and a former player.

== Career ==
Zimenkov began his professional football career with FC Lokomotyv Donetsk before joining FC Dynamo Stavropol. He had a two-year spell with FC Kairat before re-joining Dynamo Stavropol in 1977. All together, Zimenkov scored more than 50 goals in over 200 league matches with Dynamo Stavropol.
