= Boris Kolokolov =

Russian footballer and coach

Personal information
- Full name: Boris Korneyevich Kolokolov
- Date of birth: February 23, 1943 (age 83)
- Positions: Striker; midfielder

Senior career*
Years	Team	Apps	(Gls)
1968–1972	FC Luch Vladivostok		

Managerial career
- 1988: FC Amur Blagoveshchensk (assistant)
- 1989: FC Amur Blagoveshchensk (director)
- 1991–1992: FC Sakhalin Yuzhno-Sakhalinsk (assistant)
- 1992–1993: FC Shakhtyor Artyom
- 1993: FC Luch Vladivostok (assistant)
- 1996: FC Luch Vladivostok
- 1997: FC Luch Vladivostok (assistant)
- * Club domestic league appearances and goals as of 18:08, 15 October 2009 (UTC)

Boris Korneyevich Kolokolov (Russian: Борис Корнеевич Колоколов; born February 23, 1943) is a Russian professional football coach and a former player.
