= FC Kinotavr Podolsk =

- Full name: Football Club Kinotavr Podolsk
- Founded: 1992
- Dissolved: 1993
- League: Russian Second Division, Zone 3
- 1992: 21st

FC Kinotavr Podolsk (Russian: «Кинотавр» (Подольск)) was a Russian football team from Podolsk. It played professionally for a single season in 1992 in the Russian Second Division, losing 38 out of the 40 games they played, allowing 147 goals and recording a 0-13 and 0-10 losses.
