= Igor Gileb =

Russian footballer and coach

Personal information
- Full name: Igor Yevgenyevich Gileb
- Date of birth: 13 April 1951 (age 75)
- Position: Defender

Senior career*
| Years | Team | Apps | (Gls) |
| 1971–1972 | FC Dynamo Stavropol | 15 | (0) |

Managerial career
- 1992: FC Dynamo Izobilny
- 1992: FC Dynamo Izobilny (assistant)
- 1995: FC Dynamo Stavropol (assistant)
- 1997: FC Dynamo Stavropol (assistant)
- 1997: FC Dynamo Stavropol
- 1997–1998: FC Dynamo Stavropol (assistant)
- 2000–2002: FC Dynamo Stavropol (assistant)
- 2002: FC Dynamo Stavropol
- 2004: FC Arsenal Tula (assistant)
- 2005: FC Tom Tomsk (assistant)
- * Club domestic league appearances and goals

Igor Yevgenyevich Gileb (Russian: Игорь Евгеньевич Гилеб; born 13 April 1951) is a Russian football coach and a former player.
