= Dmitri Silin =

Russian footballer

Personal information
- Full name: Dmitri Aleksandrovich Silin
- Date of birth: 9 July 1967 (age 59)
- Place of birth: Leningrad, Russian SFSR
- Height: 1.78 m (5 ft 10 in)
- Position: Forward

Youth career
- Skorokhod Leningrad

Senior career*
Years	Team	Apps	(Gls)
1984	FC Dynamo Leningrad	4	(0)
1986	FC Lokomotiv Leningrad (amateur)		
1988–1991	FC Lokomotiv St. Petersburg (amateur)		
1992	FC Lokomotiv St. Petersburg	37	(15)
1993–2000	FC Baltika Kaliningrad	271	(84)
2001	FC Dynamo-SPb St. Petersburg	37	(12)
2002	FC Dynamo Bryansk	22	(5)
2002	FC Spartak Lukhovitsy	9	(0)
2003	FC Neman Kaliningrad		
- * Club domestic league appearances and goals

Dmitri Aleksandrovich Silin (Russian: Дмитрий Александрович Силин; born 9 July 1967) is a former Russian professional football player.

== Honours ==
- Russian First Division top scorer: 1994 (35 goals).
