= Mikhail Maryushkin =

Russian footballer

Personal information
- Full name: Mikhail Ivanovich Maryushkin
- Date of birth: 14 June 1968 (age 58)
- Place of birth: Moscow, Russian SFSR
- Height: 1.79 m (5 ft 10 1/2 in)
- Positions: Forward; midfielder

Youth career
- FC Dynamo Moscow

Senior career*
Years	Team	Apps	(Gls)
1986	FC Dynamo Moscow	0	(0)
1992	FC Pele Moscow	39	(26)
1993	FC Lokomotiv Moscow	8	(0)
1993–1994	FC Pirin Blagoevgrad		
1994–1995	FC Saturn Ramenskoye	51	(18)
1996	FC MChS-Selyatino Selyatino	5	(0)
1997	FC Spartak Ryazan	0	(0)
1997	FC Gigant Voskresensk		
- * Club domestic league appearances and goals

Mikhail Ivanovich Maryushkin (Russian: Михаил Иванович Марьюшкин; born 14 June 1968) is a former Russian professional footballer.

== Club career ==
He played in the Russian Premier League for FC Lokomotiv Moscow in 1993.

== Honours ==
- Russian Second Division Zone 3 top scorer: 1992 (26 goals).
