= Mikhail Golikov =

Russian footballer

Personal information
- Full name: Mikhail Anatolyevich Golikov
- Date of birth: 21 November 1969 (age 56)
- Height: 1.75 m (5 ft 9 in)
- Positions: Forward; midfielder

Senior career*
Years	Team	Apps	(Gls)
1988–1990	FC Zvezda Moscow	55	(6)
1990–1992	FC Volgar Astrakhan	96	(37)
1993–1995	FC Asmaral Moscow	82	(13)
1993–1994	→ FC Asmaral-d Moscow (loans)	13	(1)
1996–1997	FC Shinnik Yaroslavl	45	(1)
1997–1998	FC Torpedo-ZIL Moscow	51	(12)
2000–2001	FC Dynamo Vologda	45	(11)
2002	FC Stroitel Ufa	3	(0)
- * Club domestic league appearances and goals

Mikhail Anatolyevich Golikov (Russian: Михаил Анатольевич Голиков; born 21 November 1969) is a former Russian football player.

== Club career ==
He made his Russian Premier League debut for FC Asmaral Moscow on 7 March 1993 in a game against FC Spartak Vladikavkaz. He played one more season on the top level with FC Shinnik Yaroslavl.
