= Andrei Golubev (footballer) =

Russian footballer

Personal information
- Full name: Andrei Sergeyevich Golubev
- Date of birth: 27 January 1993 (age 33)
- Place of birth: Izhevsk, Russia
- Height: 1.87 m (6 ft 2 in)
- Position: Goalkeeper

Team information
- Current team: FC Neftekhimik Nizhnekamsk
- Number: 1

Senior career*
Years	Team	Apps	(Gls)
2010	LFK Rubin Kazan		
2011–2018	FC Zenit-Izhevsk	55	(0)
2018–	FC Neftekhimik Nizhnekamsk	179	(0)
- * Club domestic league appearances and goals as of 16 May 2026

Andrei Sergeyevich Golubev (Russian: Андрей Серге́евич Голубев; born 27 January 1993) is a Russian football goalkeeper who plays for FC Neftekhimik Nizhnekamsk.

== Club career ==
He made his debut in the Russian Second Division for FC Zenit-Izhevsk on 8 June 2011 in a game against FC Volga Ulyanovsk.

He made his Russian Football National League debut for FC Neftekhimik Nizhnekamsk on 7 July 2019 in a game against FC Mordovia Saransk.
