= Igor Syrov =

Russian footballer

Personal information
- Full name: Igor Vladimirovich Syrov
- Date of birth: 19 September 1969 (age 57)
- Height: 1.78 m (5 ft 10 in)
- Position: Forward

Senior career*
Years	Team	Apps	(Gls)
1989	ShVSM-SKA Kuybyshev	23	(5)
1991–1994	FC Devon Oktyabrsky	131	(67)
1995	FC Torpedo Volzhsky	4	(0)
1995–1996	FC Nosta Novotroitsk	57	(17)
- * Club domestic league appearances and goals

Igor Vladimirovich Syrov (Russian: Игорь Владимирович Сыров; born 19 September 1969) is a retired Russian professional football player.

== Club career ==
He played in the Russian Football National League for FC Torpedo Volzhsky in 1995.

== Honours ==
- Russian Second Division Zone 6 top scorer: 1993 (31 goals).
