= Eduard Rakhmangulov =

Russian footballer

Personal information
- Full name: Eduard Anasovich Rakhmangulov
- Date of birth: 6 June 1966
- Date of death: 29 July 1999 (aged 33)
- Positions: Forward; midfielder

Senior career*
Years	Team	Apps	(Gls)
1984	FC Gastello Ufa		
1985	FC Krylia Sovetov Kuybyshev	21	(1)
1988–1989	FC Gastello Ufa	41	(7)
1989–1990	FC Kuzbass Kemerovo	7	(0)
1990–1991	FC Gastello Ufa	61	(16)
1992–1993	FC Neftekhimik Nizhnekamsk	47	(31)
1993	FC Avangard Kamyshin	17	(4)
1994	FC Estel Ufa	24	(16)
1995	FC Zvezda Perm	26	(4)
- * Club domestic league appearances and goals

Eduard Anasovich Rakhmangulov (Russian: Эдуард Анасович Рахмангулов; born 6 June 1966; died 29 July 1999 in an automobile accident) was a Russian professional football player.

== Club career ==
He made his Russian Football National League debut for FC Neftekhimik Nizhnekamsk on 11 April 1993 in a game against FC Gazovik Izhevsk.

== Honours ==
- Russian Second Division Zone 5 top scorer: 1992 (26 goals).
