= Viktor Zernov =

Russian footballer

Personal information
- Full name: Viktor Yevgenyevich Zernov
- Date of birth: 3 January 1945 (age 81)
- Place of birth: Moscow, Russian SFSR
- Position: Defender

Youth career
- FC Spartak Moscow

Senior career*
Years	Team	Apps	(Gls)
1963	FC Spartak Moscow	0	(0)
1964	FC Spartak Tambov		
1967	FC Spartak Tambov		
1968	FC Rassvet Krasnoyarsk	11	(0)
1969–1972	FC Saturn Ramenskoye		
1972–1973	FC Sibiryak Bratsk		
1974–1975	FC Krasnaya Zvezda Moscow		

Managerial career
- 1976–1977: SK Frezer Moscow
- 1978–1984: FC Spartak Moscow (academy)
- 1988: FC Geolog Tyumen (assistant)
- 1989–1995: FC Spartak-d Moscow
- 1996–1998: Myanmar Armed Forces
- 1998: PFC Spartak Nalchik
- 1999: FC Dynamo-2 Moscow
- 1999–2000: Iran (assistant)
- 2000–2001: FC Spartak Moscow (scout)
- 2001: FC Chernomorets Novorossiysk
- 2001: FC Krasnoznamensk
- 2003: FC Spartak Kostroma
- 2003–2004: FC Spartak Moscow (academy)
- 2004: MTZ-RIPO Minsk
- 2004–2006: FC Spartak Moscow (academy)
- * Club domestic league appearances and goals

Viktor Yevgenyevich Zernov (Russian: Виктор Евгеньевич Зернов; born 3 January 1945) is a Russian professional football coach and a former player.
