= Makhach Kerimov =

Russian footballer and coach

Personal information
- Full name: Makhach Ibragimovich Kerimov
- Date of birth: 10 March 1955
- Date of death: 1 May 2021 (aged 66)
- Height: 1.76 m (5 ft 9 1/2 in)
- Position: Defender

Senior career*
Years	Team	Apps	(Gls)
1976–1977	FC Dynamo Makhachkala	71	(0)
1979–1980	FC Dynamo Makhachkala	46	(0)

Managerial career
- 1992: FC Anzhi Makhachkala
- 1993–1995: FC Anzhi Makhachkala (team director)
- 1996–1997: FC Anzhi Makhachkala (assistant)
- * Club domestic league appearances and goals

Makhach Ibragimovich Kerimov (Russian: Махач Ибрагимович Керимов; born 10 March 1955 — dead 01.05.2021) is a Russian football coach and a former player.
