= Viktor Razumovskiy =

Soviet footballer (1932–2019)

Personal information
- Full name: Viktor Nikolaevich Razumovskiy
- Date of birth: 3 August 1932
- Place of birth: Moscow, Soviet Union
- Date of death: 4 January 2019 (aged 86)
- Place of death: Moscow, Russia
- Position: Midfielder

Youth career
- Torpedo Moscow

Senior career*
| Years | Team | Apps | (Gls) |
| 1954–1957 | Lokomotiv Moscow | 27 | (10) |

Managerial career
- 1982–1985: FShM Moscow
- 1991–1992: TRASKO Moscow
- 1993–1994: Chertanovo Moscow
- * Club domestic league appearances and goals

Viktor Nikolaevich Razumovskiy (Russian: Виктор Николаевич Разумовский; 3 August 1932 – 4 January 2019) was a Soviet footballer who played as a midfielder in the 1950s.

== Career ==
Born in Moscow, Razumovskiy began playing youth football with local side FC Torpedo Moscow. He became a professional with FC Lokomotiv Moscow where he scored 10 goals in 27 Soviet Top League matches. Razumovskiy participated in Lokomotiv Moscow's 1955 tour of Asia, playing against national sides from Burma, India and Indonesia.

Razumovskiy died in January 2019.
