= FC Angara Boguchany =

- Full name: Football Club Angara Boguchany
- Founded: 1992
- Dissolved: 1993
- League: Russian Second Division, Zone 6
- 1992: 12th

FC Angara Boguchany (Russian: «Ангара» (Богучаны)) was a Russian football team from Boguchany, Krasnoyarsk Krai. It played professionally for a single season in 1992 in the Russian Second Division.
