= Vladimir Petrov (footballer) =

Soviet footballer and Russian coach

Personal information
- Full name: Vladimir Pavlovich Petrov
- Date of birth: 20 March 1940 (age 86)
- Place of birth: Moscow, RSFSR, USSR
- Position: Defender

Youth career
- FShM Moscow

Senior career*
Years	Team	Apps	(Gls)
1959–1971	FC Spartak Moscow		
1972	FC Torpedo Kutaisi		

International career
1960, 1964	USSR	3	

Managerial career
- 1984: FC Shinnik Yaroslavl (assistant)
- 1985–1988: FC Shinnik Yaroslavl (director)
- 1989: FC Shinnik Yaroslavl
- 1990–1991: FC Shinnik Yaroslavl (director)
- 1992: FC Kolos Krasnodar
- 1993: FC Anzhi Makhachkala
- 1994: FC Druzhba Yoshkar-Ola
- 1995: FC Avtomobilist Noginsk
- 1996: FC Sibir Kurgan
- 1997: FC MEPhI Moscow
- * Club domestic league appearances and goals

Vladimir Pavlovich Petrov (Russian: Владимир Павлович Петров) (born 20 March 1940) is a retired Soviet football player and a Russian coach.

== Honours ==
- Soviet Top League winner: 1962, 1969.
- Soviet Cup winner: 1965.

== International career ==
Petrov made his debut for USSR on 17 August 1960 in a friendly against East Germany.
