= FC Idel Kazan =

- Full name: Football Club Idel Kazan
- Founded: 1992
- Dissolved: 1993
- League: Russian Second Division, Zone 5
- 1992: 18th

FC Idel Kazan (Russian: «Идель» (Казань)) was a Russian football team from Kazan. It played professionally in the Russian Second Division for one season in 1992.
