= Valeri Solyanik =

Russian footballer

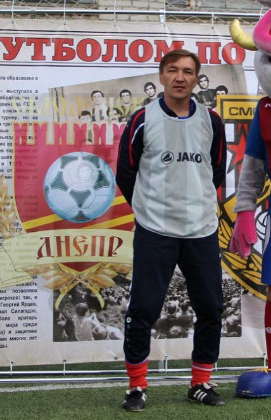
- Image of Valeri Valeryevich Solyanik

Personal information
- Full name: Valeri Valeryevich Solyanik
- Date of birth: December 1, 1966 (age 59)
- Height: 1.74 m (5 ft 8 1/2 in)
- Position: Striker

Team information
- Current team: FC Dnepr Smolensk (assistant)

Senior career*
Years	Team	Apps	(Gls)
1993–2003	FC Kristall Smolensk	327	(162)
2007	FC Smolensk	27	(5)

Managerial career
- 2012–: FC Dnepr Smolensk (assistant)
- * Club domestic league appearances and goals

Valeri Valeryevich Solyanik (Russian: Валерий Валерьевич Соляник; born December 1, 1966) is a retired Russian professional football player. Before joining FC Kristall at the age of 27 he played on amateur level in local competitions.

== Career ==
Solyanik is the leading goal-scorer in the history of Smolensk football. He scored 161 goals for FC Kristall Smolensk playing the Russian First Division, Russian Second Division and Russian Third Division. He also scored five goals playing for FC Smolensk.

== Honours ==
- Russian Third League Zone 4 top scorer: 1994 (24 goals).
