= Anatoli Lyz =

Russian professional football coach (born 1943)

Personal information
- Full name: Anatoli Nikolayevich Lyz
- Date of birth: February 27, 1943 (age 83)

Managerial career
- Years: Team
- 1992–1996: FC Venets Gulkevichi
- 1997–1999: FC Zhemchuzhina-2 Sochi

Anatoli Nikolayevich Lyz (Russian: Анатолий Николаевич Лызь; born February 27, 1943) is a Russian professional football coach.

== Career ==
Born in the Apanasenkovsky District of Stavropol Krai, Lyz played football while studying at university with SKIF Nikolay Nikolayevsk, but was never promoted to the senior side. After he graduated, he began a career as a manager, starting out at DSO Urozhay. He would spend most of his managerial career working in various capacities for clubs and academies in the Kuban region.

Lyz became manager of a new amateur football club, FC Venets Gulkevichi, in 1989, and ultimately led the club through promotion to the Russian Second Division. By 1996, he was appointed manager of FC Zhemchuzhina-2 Sochi also in the Second Division.
