= FC Derbent =

- Full name: Football Club Derbent
- Founded: 1966
- Dissolved: 1997
- League: Russian Third League, Zone 1
- 1996: 12th

FC Derbent (Russian: «Дербент») was a Russian football team from Derbent. It played professionally in 1966–1970, 1992 and 1995–1996. The best result they achieved was 4th place in Zone 2, Subgroup 2 of the Soviet Second League in 1969.

== Team name history ==
- 1966–1968: FC Urozhay Derbent
- 1970–1991: FC Vinogradar Derbent
- 1992–1994: FC Altair-Khelling Derbent
- 1995–1996: FC Derbent
