= FC Vaynakh Shali =

- Full name: Football Club Vaynakh Shali
- Founded: 1991
- Dissolved: 1993
- League: Russian Second Division, Zone 1
- 1992: 20th
Home colours	Away colours

FC Vaynakh Shali (Russian: «Вайнах» (Шали)) was a Russian football team from Shali. It played professionally in 1991 and 1992. Their best result was 20th place in the Zone 1 of the Russian Second Division in 1992.
