= Givi Kerashvili =

Russian footballer and coach

Personal information
- Full name: Givi Shalvovich Kerashvili
- Date of birth: 1 October 1953 (age 73)
- Place of birth: Dzaudzhikau, Russian SFSR
- Height: 1.68 m (5 ft 6 in)
- Positions: Midfielder; striker; defender

Senior career*
Years	Team	Apps	(Gls)
1971–1979	FC Spartak Ordzhonikidze	206	(23)

Managerial career
- 1990–1992: FC Avtodor-Olaf Vladikavkaz
- 1995: FC Avtodor-BMK Vladikavkaz
- 2001: FC Avtodor Vladikavkaz (technical director)
- 2002–2003: FC Avtodor Vladikavkaz
- 2005: FC Avtodor Vladikavkaz
- 2006: FC Avtodor Vladikavkaz (director of sports)
- 2006: FC Avtodor Vladikavkaz
- 2007: FC Avtodor Vladikavkaz (director of sports)
- 2007: FC Avtodor Vladikavkaz (caretaker)
- 2007: FC Avtodor Vladikavkaz (general director)
- 2008: FC Zhemchuzhina-Sochi (assistant)
- 2008: FC Zhemchuzhina-Sochi
- 2009: FC Avtodor Vladikavkaz (director of sports)
- 2010: FC Avtodor Vladikavkaz (deputy general director)
- * Club domestic league appearances and goals

Givi Shalvovich Kerashvili (Russian: Гиви Шалвович Керашвили; born 1 October 1953) is a Russian professional football coach and a former player.
