= Sergei Ponomaryov =

Russian footballer and coach

Personal information
- Full name: Sergei Viktorovich Ponomaryov
- Date of birth: 5 June 1953 (age 73)
- Height: 1.75 m (5 ft 9 in)
- Positions: Defender; midfielder

Senior career*
Years	Team	Apps	(Gls)
1971	FC Kuban Krasnodar	3	(0)
1972–1978	PFC Spartak Nalchik	133	(1)

Managerial career
- 1987–1990: PFC Spartak Nalchik (assistant)
- 1991: FC Etalon Baksan (assistant)
- 1992–1996: FC Kavkazkabel Prokhladny
- 2000: PFC Spartak Nalchik (assistant)
- 2000: PFC Spartak Nalchik
- 2002: FC Druzhba Maykop (assistant)
- 2003: FC Kavkazkabel Prokhladny
- 2004: FC Torpedo Volzhsky
- 2006–2008: FC Kavkaztransgaz-2005 Ryzdvyany
- 2009: FC Mashuk-KMV Pyatigorsk
- 2009–2011: FC Kavkaztransgaz-2005 Ryzdvyany
- * Club domestic league appearances and goals

Sergei Viktorovich Ponomaryov (Russian: Серге́й Викторович Пономарёв; born 5 June 1953) is a Russian professional football coach and a former player.

== Club career ==
As a player, he made his professional debut in the Soviet Second League in 1972 for FC Kuban Krasnodar.
