= FC Neftyanik Uray =

- Full name: Football Club Neftyanik Uray
- League: Russian Second Division, Zone 6
- 1992: 9th

FC Neftyanik Uray (Russian: «Нефтяник» (Урай)) was a Russian football team from Uray. It played professionally in the Russian Second Division in 1992.
