= FC Zarya Leninsk-Kuznetsky =

Russian football club

- Full name: Football Club Zarya Leninsk-Kuznetsky
- Founded: 1990; 35 years ago
- League: Amateur Football League, Zone Siberia
- 2008: 10th

FC Zarya Leninsk-Kuznetsky (Russian: ФК «Заря» Ленинск‑Кузнецкий) is an association football team from Leninsk-Kuznetsky, Russia. It played professionally from 1990 to 1999 and from 2005 to 2007, including five seasons (1993–1997) in the second-highest Russian First Division.

In 1997, it reached the quarterfinals of the Russian Cup, knocking out two Russian Premier League teams (FC KAMAZ-Chally Naberezhnye Chelny and PFC CSKA Moscow).

== Team name history ==
- 1990–1991 Shakhtyor Leninsk-Kuznetsky
- 1992–1999, 2004—2009 Zarya Leninsk-Kuznetsky
- 2000–2001 Shakhtyor Leninsk-Kuznetsky
- 2002–2003 Zarya-UOR Leninsk-Kuznetsky
- 2010–present Zarya-SUEK Leninsk-Kuznetsky
