= Aleksandr Salnov =

Russian footballer and coach

Personal information
- Full name: Aleksandr Vasilyevich Salnov
- Date of birth: 8 May 1946 (age 80)
- Place of birth: Izhevsk, Russian SFSR, Soviet Union
- Positions: Midfielder; defender

Youth career
- Zenit Izhevsk

Senior career*
Years	Team	Apps	(Gls)
1964	Trud Izhevsk		
1968–1971	Zenit Izhevsk		
1974	Zenit Izhevsk		

Managerial career
- 1980–1985: Zenit Ustinov (assistant)
- 1985: Zenit Ustinov
- 1988–1991: Zenit Izhevsk (assistant)
- 1992–1993: Gazovik Izhevsk
- 1994: KAMAZ Naberezhnye Chelny (assistant)
- 1995: Kurgan
- 1997: Nosta Novotroitsk
- 1997–1998: Gazovik-Gazprom Izhevsk
- 1998–2002: Gazovik-Gazprom Izhevsk (assistant)
- 1998: Gazovik-Gazprom Izhevsk
- 2002: Gazovik-Gazprom Izhevsk (caretaker)
- 2003: Dynamo Izhevsk
- 2008: SOYUZ-Gazprom Izhevsk
- * Club domestic league appearances and goals

Aleksandr Vasilyevich Salnov (Russian: Александр Васильевич Сальнов; born 8 May 1946) is a Russian professional football coach and a former player.

Salnov played in the Soviet First League with Zenit Izhevsk.
