= Vladimir Kovylin =

Russian footballer and coach

Personal information
- Full name: Vladimir Aleksandrovich Kovylin
- Date of birth: 12 August 1954 (age 72)
- Positions: Striker; defender

Team information
- Current team: FC Tambov-M Tambov

Senior career*
Years	Team	Apps	(Gls)
1976	FC Revtrud Tambov	19	(3)
1976–1977	FC Rubin Kazan	14	(0)
1981–1986	FC Spartak Tambov	109	(20)

Managerial career
- 1988–1990: FC Spartak Tambov (assistant)
- 1991–2003: FC Spartak Tambov
- 2003–2006: FC Spartak Tambov
- 2007–2008: FC Ryazan
- 2009–2011: FC Spartak Tambov
- 2014–: FC Tambov-M Tambov
- * Club domestic league appearances and goals

Vladimir Aleksandrovich Kovylin (Russian: Владимир Александрович Ковылин; born 12 August 1954) is a Russian professional football coach and a former player. Currently, he manages FC Tambov-M, the youth squad of FC Tambov. As a player, he made his debut in the Soviet Second League in 1976 for FC Revtrud Tambov (as Spartak Tambov was then known).

== Honours ==
- Russian Second Division Zone Center best manager: 2004.
