= Vladimir Pantyushenko =

Russian footballer

Personal information
- Full name: Vladimir Nikolayevich Pantyushenko
- Date of birth: 15 December 1975 (age 50)
- Place of birth: Dushanbe, Tajik SFSR
- Height: 1.78 m (5 ft 10 in)
- Position: Forward

Youth career
- FC Pamir Dushanbe
- FC Kuban Krasnodar

Senior career*
Years	Team	Apps	(Gls)
1993–1995	FC Kuban Krasnodar	86	(7)
1996	FC Rubin Kazan	40	(20)
1997	FC Kuban Krasnodar	1	(0)
1997	FC Rubin Kazan	31	(16)
1998	FC Samotlor-XXI Nizhnevartovsk	27	(12)
1999	FC Rubin Kazan	8	(0)
1999	FC Chkalovets Novosibirsk	14	(7)
2000	FC Kuban Krasnodar	18	(12)
2000	FC GNS-Spartak Krasnodar		
2001	FC Chkalovets-Olimpik Novosibirsk	6	(1)
2001	FC Chkalovets-1936 Novosibirsk	11	(6)
2002–2004	FC Sodovik Sterlitamak	72	(39)
2005	FC Taraz	8	(0)
2006	FC Azovets Primorsko-Akhtarsk		
2008	FC Dynamo Krasnodar		
2009–2012	FC GNS-Spartak Krasnodar		
- * Club domestic league appearances and goals

Vladimir Nikolayevich Pantyushenko (Russian: Владимир Николаевич Пантюшенко; born 15 December 1975) is a former Russian professional football player.

== Honours ==
- Russian Second Division Zone Ural top scorer: 2002 (18 goals).
