= Nikolai Gosudarenkov =

Russian football coach (born 1950)

Personal information
- Full name: Nikolai Vasilyevich Gosudarenkov
- Date of birth: May 21, 1950 (age 76)

Team information
- Current team: FC Novgorod (manager)

Managerial career
- Years: Team
- 1992–1997: FC Gatchina
- 2001–2002: FC Dynamo-SPb St. Petersburg (assistant)
- 2002: FC Spartak Lukhovitsy (assistant)
- 2003: FC Svetogorets Svetogorsk
- 2004–2005: FC Petrotrest St. Petersburg (director of sports)
- 2005: FC Petrotrest St. Petersburg (assistant)
- 2006–2007: FC Sheksna Cherepovets
- 2009–: FC Novgorod

Nikolai Vasilyevich Gosudarenkov (Russian: Николай Васильевич Государенков; born May 21, 1950) is a Russian professional football coach. As of 2009, he manages an Amateur Football League team FC Novgorod.

Gosudarenkov had a brief spell as caretaker manager of Russian First Division side FC Petrotrest St. Petersburg in June 2005.
