= FC Viktoriya Nazarovo =

- Full name: Football Club Viktoriya Nazarovo
- Founded: 1994
- Dissolved: 1999
- League: Russian Second Division, Zone East
- 1998: 12th

FC Viktoriya Nazarovo (Russian: «Виктория» (Назарово)) was a Russian football team from Nazarovo.
