= FC Dynamo Omsk =

- Full name: Football Club Dynamo Omsk
- Founded: 1993
- Dissolved: 2001
- League: Russian Second Division, Zone East
- 2001: Excluded after 11 games

FC Dynamo Omsk (Russian: «Динамо» (Омск)) was a Russian football team from Omsk. It played professionally from 1993 to 2001. Their best result was 7th place in Zone 7 of the Russian Second Division in 1993.
