= Aleksandr Korolyov (footballer) =

Russian footballer and coach

Personal information
- Full name: Aleksandr Petrovich Korolyov
- Date of birth: 15 December 1953
- Date of death: 2006 (aged 52–53)
- Positions: Forward; midfielder

Senior career*
| Years | Team | Apps | (Gls) |
| 1971–1973 | FC Volga Ulyanovsk | | |
| 1975–1976 | FC Volga Ulyanovsk | 69 | (12) |
| 1979 | FC Krylia Sovetov Kuybyshev | 5 | (0) |

Managerial career
- 1989: FC Start Ulyanovsk
- 1990: FC Start Ulyanovsk (director)
- 1992–1994: FC Tekstilshchik Isheyevka
- 1995–1996: FC Svetotekhnika Saransk
- 1997–1998: FC Volga Ulyanovsk
- 1999–2001: FC Gazovik Orenburg
- 2002–2004: FC Zenit Chelyabinsk
- 2005: FC Lada-SOK Dimitrovgrad (assistant)
- * Club domestic league appearances and goals

Aleksandr Petrovich Korolyov (Russian: Александр Петрович Королёв; 15 December 1953 – 2006) was a Russian professional football coach and a past player.
