= FC Shakhta Raspadskaya Mezhdurechensk =

Russian football club

- Full name: Football Club Shakhta Raspadskaya Mezhdurechensk
- Founded: 1969
- League: Amateur Football League, Zone Siberia
- 2010: 1st

FC Shakhta Raspadskaya Mezhdurechensk (Russian: Шахта «Распадская» (Междуреченск)) is a Russian football team from Mezhdurechensk. It played professionally in 1969 and from 1995 to 1998. Their best result was 9th place in the Zone 6/RSFSR of the Soviet Second League in 1969.

== Team name history ==
- 1969 FC Motor Mezhdurechensk
- 1994 FC Shakhtyor Mezhdurechensk
- 1995–1998 FC Mezhdurechensk
- 2001–present FC Shakhta Raspadskaya Mezhdurechensk
