= FC Devon Oktyabrsky =

- Full name: Football Club Devon Oktyabrsky
- Founded: 1948
- Dissolved: 2008
- Ground: Neftyanik Stadium, Oktyabrsky
- League: Amateur Football League, Zone Privolzhye
- 2007: 11th

FC Devon Oktyabrsky (Russian: «Девон» (Октябрьский)) was a Russian football team from Oktyabrsky. It played professionally from 1967 to 1969 and from 1990 to 1995. Their best result was 1st place in Zone 6 of the Russian Second Division in 1993 (due to Russian league system reorganization in 1994 they did not advance to a higher level).

== Team name history ==
- 1967–1989: FC Neftyanik Oktyabrsky
- 1990–1992: FC Avtopribor Oktyabrsky
- 1993–1997: FC Devon Oktyabrsky
- 1998–2000: FC Devon Serafimovsky (representing Serafimovsky, Bashkortostan)
- 2001–2007: FC Devon Oktyabrsky
