= FC Magnitogorsk =

Russian football club

- Full name: Football Club Magnitogorsk
- Founded: 1932
- League: Amateur Football League, Zone Ural/Western Siberia
- 2017: 2nd

FC Magnitogorsk (Russian: ФК «Магнитогорск») is a Russian football team from Magnitogorsk. It played professionally from 1948 to 1949, 1959 to 2003 and in 2005. It plays in the Amateur Football League. It played on the second-highest level (Soviet First League and Russian First Division) in 1948–1949, 1958–1962, 1968–1969 and 1992–1993.

== Team name history ==
- 1932–1938 Metallurg Vostoka Magnitogorsk
- 1939–1996 Metallurg Magnitogorsk
- 1997–1998 Magnitka Magnitogorsk
- 1998–2003 Metallurg-Metiznik Magnitogorsk
- 2004 FC Magnitogorsk
- 2005 Metallurg-Metiznik Magnitogorsk
- 2006–present FC Magnitogorsk
