= FC Tobol Tobolsk =

Russian football club

FC «Tobol» Tobolsk
- Full name: Football Club «Tobol» (Tobolsk)
- Nickname(s): "tobolyaki"
- Founded: 1999
- Ground: SC "Tobol"
- Capacity: 3,202
- Chairman: Tobolsk football federation
- Manager: Petr Parakhin
- League: Amateur Football League, Zone Ural/Western Siberia
- 2018: 7
Home colours	Away colours

FC Tobol Tobolsk (Russian: «Тобол» (Тобольск)) is a Russian football team from Tobolsk. Founded in 1999 instead of the dissolved football club "Irtysh".

== Football name history in Tobolsk ==
At different times of the major teams in the city were:

- 1939 – «Spartak» Tobolsk
- 1963 – «Dinamo» Tobolsk
- 1990 – «Stroitel» Tobolsk
- 1991 – «Avtomobilist» Tobolsk
- 1992 – «Poisk» Tobolsk
- 1993–1999 – «Irtysh» Tobolsk
- 2000–present – «Tobol» Tobolsk

== Team name history ==
- 2000–2004 – «Tobol» Tobolsk
- 2005–2008 – «Tobol-Neftekhim» Tobolsk
- 2009–present – «Tobol» Tobolsk
