= FC Aroma Gulkevichi =

- Full name: Football Club Aroma Gulkevichi
- Founded: 1989
- Dissolved: 2009
- League: Amateur Football League, Zone South
- 2008: 10th

FC Aroma Gulkevichi (Russian: «Арома» (Гулькевичи)) was a Russian football team from Gulkevichi. It played professionally from 1992 to 2002. Their best result was 4th place in Zone 2 of the Russian Second Division in 1993.

== Team name history ==
- 1989-2006 FC Venets Gulkevichi
- 2007-2008 FC Aroma Gulkevichi
