= FC Taganrog =

Russian football club

- Full name: Football Club Taganrog
- Founded: 2006
- Dissolved: 2015
- Ground: Torpedo
- 2014–15: Russian Professional Football League; Zone South, 9th
Home colours	Away colours

FC Taganrog (Russian: ФК Таганрог) is an association football club from Taganrog, Russia, founded in 2006, it played in the third-tier Russian Professional Football League since it was founded. It was dissolved after the 2014–15 season due to lack of financing.
