= FC Kolos Krasnodar =

- Full name: Football Club Kolos Krasnodar
- Founded: 1992; 33 years ago
- Dissolved: 1996; 29 years ago
- 1996: Russian Second Division, Zone West, did not finish

FC Kolos Krasnodar (Russian: ФК «Колос» Краснодар) was a Russian football team from Krasnodar. It played professionally from 1992 to 1996, including two seasons (1993 and 1995) in the second-highest Russian First Division.

== Reserve squad ==
Kolos's reserve squad played professionally as FC Kolos-2 Krasnodar (Russian Second League in 1993 and Russian Third League in 1994) and as FC Kolos-d Krasnodar in the Russian Third League in 1995.
