= FC Angara Angarsk =

- Full name: Football Club Angara Angarsk
- Founded: 1963
- Dissolved: 2004
- League: Amateur Football League, Zone Siberia
- 2003: 6th

FC Angara Angarsk (Russian: «Ангара» (Ангарск)) was a Russian football team from Angarsk. It played professionally in 1963–1973, 1976–1985 and 1990–1997. Their best result was 1st place in Zone 7 of the Russian Second Division in 1993 (due to reorganization of the Russian football league pyramid in 1994 they did not advance to the higher level).

== Team name history ==
- 1963–1975: FC Start Angarsk
- 1976–1991: FC Angara Angarsk
- 1992: FC Aleks Angarsk
- 1993–2003: FC Angara Angarsk
