= FC Leningradets Gatchina =

FC Leningradec Gatchina
- Full name: Football Club Leningradets Gatchina
- Founded: 1992 / 2015
- Dissolved: 1997
- Ground: Spartak Stadium, Gatchina
- Capacity: 7,220
- Manager: Andrei Simonik
- League: Russian Third Division, Zone West
- 2018: 6th

FC "Leningradets" Gatchina (Russian: ФК Ленинградец "Гатчина") is a Russian football team from Gatchina.

It played professionally from 1992 to 1997. Their best result was 7th place in Zone 3 of the Russian Second Division in 1992. It was reestablished in 2015, and since 2018, it has competed in the Russian Third League. In 2019, it became a farm club for FC Leningradets.

== Team name history ==
- 1992: FC Aleks Gatchina
- 1993–1997, 2015-2019: FC Gatchina
- 2019–: S.Sh. Leningradets Gatchina
