= FC Avtozapchast Baksan =

- Full name: Football Club Avtozapchast Baksan
- Founded: 1991
- League: Amateur Football League, Zone South
- 1999: 5th

FC Avtozapchast Baksan (Russian: «Автозапчасть» (Баксан)) was a football team from Baksan, Russia. It played professionally from 1991 to 1997. Its best result was 4th place in the Zone West of the Russian Second Division in 1996.

== Team name history ==
- 1991–1992: FC Etalon Baksan
- 1993–1999: FC Avtozapchast Baksan
