= FC Kavkazkabel Prokhladny =

- Full name: Football Club Kavkazkabel Prokhladny
- Founded: 1990
- Dissolved: 2007
- League: Amateur Football League, Zone South
- 2006: 9th

Football Club Kavkazkabel Prokhladny (Russian: «Кавказкабель» (Прохладный)) was a Russian football team from Prokhladny. It played professionally from 1990 to 2003. The best result it achieved was 2nd place in the Zone 1 of the Russian Second Division in 2003.

== Team name history ==
- 1990–1991: FC Remontnik Prokhladny
- 1992–2006: FC Kavkazkabel Prokhladny
