= FC Tobol Kurgan =

Russian football club

- Full name: Football Club Tobol Kurgan
- Founded: 1960
- League: Amateur Football League, Zone Ural and West Siberia
- 2009: 4th

FC Tobol Kurgan (Russian: «Тобол» (Курган)) is a Russian football team from Kurgan. As of 2009, it plays in the Amateur Football League. It played professionally in 1960–1975, 1986–2001 and 2003–2005. They played on the second-highest level in the Soviet First League from 1960 to 1962, where their best result was 8th place in Zone 5 in 1961.

== Team name history ==
- 1960–1964: FC Stroitel Kurgan
- 1965–1966: FC Trud Kurgan
- 1967–1971: FC Zauralets Kurgan
- 1972–1985: FC Zauralye Kurgan
- 1986–1988: FC Torpedo Kurgan
- 1989–1990: FC Zauralye Kurgan
- 1991–1998: FC Sibir Kurgan
- 1999–2000: FC Kurgan
- 2000–2001: FC Spartak Kurgan
- 2002–present: FC Tobol Kurgan
