= 1993 Russian Second League =

Russian Second League
- Season: 1993

The 1993 Russian Second League was the second edition of Russian Second Division. There were 7 zones with 124 teams in total. In 1994 the Russian League system was reorganized, with First League reduced to one tournament instead of 3 zones and new professional Third League organized, where most of the teams from the 1993 Second League ended up. No teams were promoted to the 1994 Russian First League.

== Zone 1 ==
Team	Head coach
FC Anzhi Makhachkala	Vladimir Petrov
FC Avtozapchast Baksan	Yuri Pazov
FC Iriston Vladikavkaz	Teymuraz Kozyrev
FC Kavkazkabel Prokhladny	Sergei Ponomaryov
FC Dynamo Makhachkala	Kamach Kabayev
FC Druzhba Budyonnovsk	Sergei Tashuev
FC Volgar Astrakhan	Vladimir Yerofeyev

Team	Head coach
FC Astrateks Astrakhan	Ivan Buzychkin
FC Sherstyanik Nevinnomyssk	Leonid Shevchenko
FC Baysachnr Elista	Valeri Zubakov
FC Kaspiy Kaspiysk	Vladimir Kotelnikov
FC Beshtau Lermontov	Aleksandr Vershenko
FC Mashuk Pyatigorsk	Sergei Razaryonov
FC Urartu Grozny	Ruslan Gargayev

=== Stage 1 ===
Pos	Team	Pld	W	D	L	GF	GA	GD	Pts	Qualification
1	FC Anzhi Makhachkala	26	21	1	4	80	16	+64	43	Qualified for the 1st to 7th places tournament
2	FC Avtozapchast Baksan	26	17	2	7	45	32	+13	36	Qualified for the 1st to 7th places tournament
3	FC Iriston Vladikavkaz	26	16	2	8	44	36	+8	34	Qualified for the 1st to 7th places tournament
4	FC Kavkazkabel Prokhladny	26	15	3	8	51	29	+22	33	Qualified for the 1st to 7th places tournament
5	FC Dynamo Makhachkala	26	15	2	9	47	33	+14	32	Qualified for the 1st to 7th places tournament
6	FC Druzhba Budyonnovsk	26	13	5	8	55	30	+25	31	Qualified for the 1st to 7th places tournament
7	FC Volgar Astrakhan	26	13	3	10	32	25	+7	29	Qualified for the 1st to 7th places tournament
8	FC Astrateks Astrakhan	26	11	4	11	36	33	+3	26	
9	FC Sherstyanik Nevinnomyssk	26	11	2	13	50	44	+6	24	
10	FC Baysachnr Elista	26	9	1	16	35	47	−12	19	
11	FC Kaspiy Kaspiysk	26	9	1	16	35	47	−12	19	
12	FC Beshtau Lermontov	26	8	2	16	36	52	−16	18	
13	FC Mashuk Pyatigorsk	26	7	4	15	24	40	−16	18	
14	FC Urartu Grozny	26	0	2	24	15	104	−89	2	

Notes:

1. FC Baysachnr Elista played on the amateur level as FC Gilyan Elista in 1992.
2. FC Etalon Baksan renamed to FC Avtozapchast Baksan.

=== 1st to 7th places tournament ===
Pos	Team	Pld	W	D	L	GF	GA	GD	Pts	Relegation
1	FC Anzhi Makhachkala	38	27	1	10	98	31	+67	55	
2	FC Kavkazkabel Prokhladny	38	22	3	13	69	43	+26	47	
3	FC Dynamo Makhachkala	38	22	3	13	70	51	+19	47	
4	FC Iriston Vladikavkaz	38	21	5	12	62	55	+7	47	
5	FC Avtozapchast Baksan	38	21	4	13	61	57	+4	46	Relegated to the 1994 Russian Third League
6	FC Druzhba Budyonnovsk	38	19	6	13	78	48	+30	44	Relegated to the 1994 Russian Third League
7	FC Volgar Astrakhan	38	15	6	17	50	50	0	36	Relegated to the 1994 Russian Third League

=== 8th to 14th places tournament ===
Pos	Team	Pld	W	D	L	GF	GA	GD	Pts	Relegation
8	FC Astrateks Astrakhan	38	19	7	12	70	47	+23	45	Relegated to the 1994 Russian Third League
9	FC Sherstyanik Nevinnomyssk	38	18	5	15	67	53	+14	41	Relegated to the 1994 Russian Third League
10	FC Baysachnr Elista	38	16	1	21	57	64	−7	33	Relegated to the 1994 Russian Third League
11	FC Kaspiy Kaspiysk	38	13	2	23	41	84	−43	28	Relegated to the 1994 Russian Third League
12	FC Beshtau Lermontov	38	11	4	23	52	72	−20	26	Relegated to the 1994 Russian Third League
13	FC Mashuk Pyatigorsk	38	10	6	22	34	59	−25	26	Relegated to the 1994 Russian Third League
14	FC Urartu Grozny	38	4	3	31	33	128	−95	11	Relegated to the 1994 Russian Third League

Notes:

1. FC Sherstyanik Nevinnomyssk did not participate in any national-level competitions in 1994.
2. FC Baysachnr Elista was converted to the reserve team of FC Uralan Elista called FC Uralan-d Elista in 1994.

=== Top scorers ===
30 goals

- (Azerbaijan) Ibragim Gasanbekov (FC Anzhi Makhachkala)

24 goals

- Gadzhiali Alidibirov (FC Dynamo Makhachkala)

19 goals

- Aleksandr Krotov (FC Astrateks Astrakhan)
- Nikolai Shichkin (FC Astrateks Astrakhan)

18 goals

- Abilfez Madanov (FC Sherstyanik Nevinnomyssk)

17 goals

- Gennadi Goncharov (FC Baysachnr Elista)

15 goals

- Vladimir Benedsky (FC Druzhba Budyonnovsk)

14 goals

- Alik Dulayev (FC Iriston Vladikavkaz)
- Igor Khmelevskiy (FC Kavkazkabel Prokhladny)

13 goals

- Aleksandr Bocharnikov (FC Volgar Astrakhan)
- Boris Bodzhikov (FC Baysachnr Elista)
- Yaroslav Kazberov (FC Druzhba Budyonnovsk)
- Roman Sidorov (FC Beshtau Lermontov)
- Aleksandr Solomakhin (FC Druzhba Budyonnovsk)
- Oleg Zhurtov (FC Avtozapchast Baksan)

== Zone 2 ==
Team	Head coach
FC Salyut Belgorod	Aleksandr Kryukov
FC Zvezda-Rus Gorodishche	Sergei Mukovnin
FC Rotor-d Volgograd	Yuri Marushkin
FC Venets Gulkevichi	Anatoli Lyz
FC Istochnik Rostov-on-Don	Kamil Akchurin
FC Avangard Kursk	Aleksandr Galkin
FC Kuban Barannikovsky	Nikolai Smirnov
FC Shakhtyor Shakhty	Yevgeni Grunin
FC Torpedo Armavir	Viktor Batalin

Team	Head coach
FC Niva Slavyansk-na-Kubani	Vladimir Brazhnikov
FC Khimik Belorechensk	Khamza Bagapov (until October)
FC SKA Rostov-on-Don	Aleksandr Pleshakov
FC Metallurg Krasny Sulin	Gennadi Tevosov
FC Atommash Volgodonsk	Aleksandr Rakov
FC Rostselmash-d Rostov-on-Don	Valentin Khakhonov / Yuri Shikunov
FC Kolos-2 Krasnodar	Vladimir Lagoyda (until September); Aleksandr Takmakov (from September)

=== Standings ===
Pos	Team	Pld	W	D	L	GF	GA	GD	Pts	Relegation
1	FC Salyut Belgorod	30	20	6	4	66	25	+41	46	
2	FC Zvezda-Rus Gorodishche	30	19	7	4	59	25	+34	45	
3	FC Rotor-d Volgograd	30	19	5	6	59	25	+34	43	Relegated to the 1994 Russian Third League
4	FC Venets Gulkevichi	30	19	2	9	55	38	+17	40	
5	FC Istochnik Rostov-on-Don	30	16	5	9	49	29	+20	37	Relegated to the 1994 Russian Third League
6	FC Avangard Kursk	30	15	1	14	44	59	−15	31	Relegated to the 1994 Russian Third League
7	FC Kuban Barannikovsky	30	14	3	13	46	33	+13	31	Relegated to the 1994 Russian Third League
8	FC Shakhtyor Shakhty	30	12	6	12	37	37	0	30	Relegated to the 1994 Russian Third League
9	FC Torpedo Armavir	30	12	3	15	33	45	−12	27	Relegated to the 1994 Russian Third League
10	FC Niva Slavyansk-na-Kubani	30	11	4	15	45	47	−2	26	Relegated to the 1994 Russian Third League
11	FC Khimik Belorechensk	30	10	6	14	43	42	+1	26	Relegated to the 1994 Russian Third League
12	FC SKA Rostov-on-Don	30	12	1	17	45	47	−2	25	Relegated to the 1994 Russian Third League
13	FC Metallurg Krasny Sulin	30	9	5	16	22	49	−27	23	Relegated to the 1994 Russian Third League
14	FC Atommash Volgodonsk	30	9	3	18	38	52	−14	21	Relegated to the 1994 Russian Third League
15	FC Rostselmash-d Rostov-on-Don	30	7	3	20	34	67	−33	17	Relegated to the 1994 Russian Third League
16	FC Kolos-2 Krasnodar	30	4	4	22	20	75	−55	12	Relegated to the 1994 Russian Third League

Notes:

1. FC Torpedo Adler was excluded from the league after playing 8 games and gaining 4 points. Their head coach was Vadim Nikiforov. All their results were discarded.
2. FC ISM Volzhsky was excluded from the league before playing any games. They were promoted from the Amateur Football League where they played as FC Metallurg ISM Volzhsky in 1992.
3. FC Istochnik Rostov-on-Don and FC Kolos-2 Krasnodar played their first professional season.
4. FC Energomash Belgorod renamed to FC Salyut Belgorod.
5. FC Rostselmash-d Rostov-on-Don did not play in any national-level competitions in 1994.

=== Top scorers ===
16 goals

- Konstantin Boyko (FC SKA Rostov-on-Don)
- Vladimir Korsunov (FC Shakhtyor Shakhty)

15 goals

- Roman Nerubenko (FC Salyut Belgorod)

14 goals

- Sergei Borodin (FC Zvezda-Rus Gorodishche)
- Andrei Fomichyov (FC Salyut Belgorod)
- Aleksandr Medvedev (FC Salyut Belgorod)
- Mikhail Sukhorukov (FC Avangard Kursk)

13 goals

- Aleksei Chernov (FC Zvezda-Rus Gorodishche)

12 goals

- Yuri Konovalov (FC Rotor-d Volgograd)

11 goals

- Yevgeni Borzykin (FC Avangard Kursk)
- Vladimir Grishchenko (FC Niva Slavyansk-na-Kubani)
- Aleksandr Kamentsev (FC Venets Gulkevichi)
- Vagif Shirinov (FC Kuban Barannikovskiy)
- Andrei Stepanov (FC Torpedo Armavir)

== Zone 3 ==
Team	Head coach
FC Torpedo Arzamas	Vladimir Dergach
FC Arsenal Tula	Aleksei Petrushin
FC Irgiz Balakovo	Vladimir Proskurin
FC Saranskeksport Saransk	Igor Shinkarenko
FC Kristall Smolensk	Igor Belanovich
FC Turbostroitel Kaluga	Georgi Kolmogorov
FC Iskra Smolensk	Anatoli Olkhovik
FC Zenit Penza	Aleksandr Komissarov
FC Tekstilshchik Isheyevka	Aleksandr Korolyov

Team	Head coach
FC Zavolzhye Engels	Vladimir Litovchenko
FC Khimik Dzerzhinsk	Mikhail Senyurin
FC Torpedo Pavlovo	Valeri Kalugin
FC Metallurg Stary Oskol	Mikhail Mironenko
FC Khimik Uvarovo	Gennadi Matveyev
FC Dynamo Bryansk	Nikolai Sergeyev
FC Spartak Tambov	Vladimir Kovylin
FC Oryol	Yuri Samulistov
FC Don Novomoskovsk	Anatoli Kashcheyev

=== Standings ===
Pos	Team	Pld	W	D	L	GF	GA	GD	Pts	Relegation
1	FC Torpedo Arzamas	34	22	8	4	62	22	+40	52	
2	FC Arsenal Tula	34	21	7	6	58	15	+43	49	
3	FC Irgiz Balakovo	34	19	9	6	58	26	+32	47	
4	FC Saranskeksport Saransk	34	19	5	10	44	37	+7	43	Relegated to the 1994 Russian Third League
5	FC Kristall Smolensk	34	16	10	8	54	31	+23	42	Relegated to the 1994 Russian Third League
6	FC Turbostroitel Kaluga	34	15	7	12	36	31	+5	37	Relegated to the 1994 Russian Third League
7	FC Iskra Smolensk	34	15	7	12	40	33	+7	37	Relegated to the 1994 Russian Third League
8	FC Zenit Penza	34	12	12	10	41	45	−4	36	Relegated to the 1994 Russian Third League
9	FC Tekstilshchik Isheyevka	34	11	11	12	27	30	−3	33	Relegated to the 1994 Russian Third League
10	FC Zavolzhye Engels	34	13	6	15	37	39	−2	32	Relegated to the 1994 Russian Third League
11	FC Khimik Dzerzhinsk	34	12	5	17	42	54	−12	29	Relegated to the 1994 Russian Third League
12	FC Torpedo Pavlovo	34	11	7	16	31	46	−15	29	Relegated to the 1994 Russian Third League
13	FC Metallurg Stary Oskol	34	10	8	16	27	49	−22	28	Relegated to the 1994 Russian Third League
14	FC Khimik Uvarovo	34	11	5	18	44	53	−9	27	Relegated to the 1994 Russian Third League
15	FC Dynamo Bryansk	34	11	5	18	37	49	−12	27	Relegated to the 1994 Russian Third League
16	FC Spartak Tambov	34	9	7	18	38	51	−13	25	Relegated to the 1994 Russian Third League
17	FC Oryol	34	7	7	20	28	54	−26	21	Relegated to the 1994 Russian Third League
18	FC Don Novomoskovsk	34	5	8	21	36	75	−39	18	Relegated to the 1994 Russian Third League

Notes:

1. FC Kristall Smolensk were promoted from the Amateur Football League where they played as FC SKD Smolensk in 1992.
2. FC Zavolzhye Engels and FC Khimik Uvarovo were promoted from the Amateur Football League.
3. FC Metallurg Stary Oskol played their first professional season.
4. FC Don Novomoskovsk did not play professionally in 1992.
5. FC MGU Saransk renamed to FC Saranskeksport Saransk.
6. FC Spartak Oryol renamed to FC Oryol.
7. FC Saranskeksport Saransk, FC Zavolzhye Engels and FC Metallurg Stary Oskol did not participate in any national-level competitions in 1994.

=== Top scorers ===
22 goals

- Vladimir Kharin (FC Irgiz Balakovo)

16 goals

- Andrei Grishchuk (FC Don Novomoskovsk)
- Anatoli Sigachyov (FC Spartak Tambov)

15 goals

- Yuri Telyushov (FC Zenit Penza)

14 goals

- German Telesh (FC Arsenal Tula)

13 goals

- Pyotr Ageyev (FC Saranskeksport Saransk)
- Vladimir Anisimov (FC Khimik Dzerzhinsk)
- Aleksei Gudkov (FC Kristall Smolensk)
- Aleksei Ivanov (FC Zavolzhye Engels)
- Vyacheslav Ulitin (FC Zenit Penza)

== Zone 4 ==
Team	Head coach
FC Torpedo-MKB Mytishchi	Vyacheslav Zhuravlyov
FC Viktor-Avangard Kolomna	Mark Tunis
FC Spartak-d Moscow	Viktor Zernov
FC Obninsk	Yuri Karamyan
FC Spartak Shchyolkovo	Viktor Fomenko
FC Torgmash Lyubertsy	Anatoli Leshchenkov
PFC CSKA-d Moscow	Aleksandr Kolpovskiy
FC Viktor-Gigant Voskresensk	Valeri Vdovin
FC Mosenergo Moscow	Valentin Sysoyev
FC Torpedo-d Moscow	Sergei Petrenko
FC Dynamo-d Moscow	Adamas Golodets

Team	Head coach
FC Oka Kolomna	Aleksandr Kuznetsov
FC Dynamo-2 Moscow	Yevgeni Baikov
FC Saturn Ramenskoye	Valeri Tyukulmin
PFC CSKA-2 Moscow	Sergei Berezin
FC TRASKO Moscow	Yuri Vereykin
FC Kosmos-Kvest Dolgoprudny	Aleksandr Logunov
FC Asmaral-d Moscow	Vladimir Mikhaylov
FC Titan Reutov	Yuri Yakovlev
FC Rekord Aleksandrov	Valentin Baturin
FC SUO Moscow	Viktor Razumovskiy
FC Lokomotiv-d Moscow	Vladimir Korotkov

=== Standings ===
Pos	Team	Pld	W	D	L	GF	GA	GD	Pts	Relegation
1	FC Torpedo-MKB Mytishchi	42	25	15	2	58	9	+49	65	Relegated to the 1994 Russian Third League
2	FC Viktor-Avangard Kolomna	42	30	4	8	86	32	+54	64	
3	FC Spartak-d Moscow	42	28	6	8	116	47	+69	62	Relegated to the 1994 Russian Third League
4	FC Obninsk	42	27	8	7	89	45	+44	62	
5	FC Spartak Shchyolkovo	42	24	10	8	75	49	+26	58	Relegated to the 1994 Russian Third League
6	FC Torgmash Lyubertsy	42	23	8	11	60	40	+20	54	Relegated to the 1994 Russian Third League
7	PFC CSKA-d Moscow	42	23	7	12	95	58	+37	53	Relegated to the 1994 Russian Third League
8	FC Viktor-Gigant Voskresensk	42	21	9	12	78	49	+29	51	Relegated to the 1994 Russian Third League
9	FC Mosenergo Moscow	42	17	10	15	52	47	+5	44	Relegated to the 1994 Russian Third League
10	FC Torpedo-d Moscow	42	15	13	14	53	43	+10	43	Relegated to the 1994 Russian Third League
11	FC Dynamo-d Moscow	42	16	9	17	89	80	+9	41	Relegated to the 1994 Russian Third League
12	FC Oka Kolomna	42	16	6	20	53	61	−8	38	Relegated to the 1994 Russian Third League
13	FC Dynamo-2 Moscow	42	16	6	20	67	71	−4	38	Relegated to the 1994 Russian Third League
14	FC Saturn Ramenskoye	42	15	8	19	44	54	−10	38	Relegated to the 1994 Russian Third League
15	PFC CSKA-2 Moscow	42	12	9	21	64	83	−19	33	Relegated to the 1994 Russian Third League
16	FC TRASKO Moscow	42	10	13	19	61	77	−16	33	Relegated to the 1994 Russian Third League
17	FC Kosmos-Kvest Dolgoprudny	42	12	8	22	49	79	−30	32	Relegated to the 1994 Russian Third League
18	FC Asmaral-d Moscow	42	10	6	26	38	77	−39	26	Relegated to the 1994 Russian Third League
19	FC Titan Reutov	42	7	12	23	45	87	−42	26	Relegated to the 1994 Russian Third League
20	FC Rekord Aleksandrov	42	10	5	27	37	76	−39	25	Relegated to the 1994 Russian Third League
21	FC SUO Moscow	42	9	5	28	43	96	−53	23	Relegated to the 1994 Russian Third League
22	FC Lokomotiv-d Moscow	42	6	3	33	42	131	−89	15	Relegated to the 1994 Russian Third League

Note:

1. FC Obninsk and FC Spartak Shchyolkovo promoted from the Amateur Football League.
2. FC Kosmos-Kvest Dolgoprudny promoted from the Amateur Football League, where they played in 1992 as FC Kosmos Dolgoprudny.
3. FC Viktor-Gigant Voskresensk, FC Rekord Aleksandrov and FC SUO Moscow played their first professional season.
4. FC Torpedo Mytishchi renamed to FC Torpedo-MKB Mytishchi.
5. FC Avangard Kolomna renamed to FC Viktor-Avangard Kolomna.
6. FC Presnya Moscow renamed to FC Asmaral-d Moscow.

=== Top scorers ===
32 goals

- Salekh Abdulkayumov (FC Obninsk)

29 goals

- Andrey Tikhonov (FC Spartak-d Moscow)

22 goals

- Igor Nekrasov (FC Dynamo-2 Moscow)
- Igor Voronin (FC Torgmash Lyubertsy)

21 goals

- Leonid Markevich (PFC CSKA-d Moscow)

20 goals

- Aleksandr Kiryanov (PFC CSKA-2 Moscow)
- Igor Konyayev (FC Obninsk)

18 goals

- Aleksandr Antonov (FC Viktor-Avangard Kolomna)
- Aleksei Kutsenko (FC Dynamo-2 Moscow)

17 goals

- Vyacheslav Melnikov (PFC CSKA-d Moscow)
- Nikolai Simachyov (FC Spartak Shchyolkovo)

== Zone 5 ==
Team	Head coach
FC Vympel Rybinsk	Vladimir Bubnov
FC Erzi Petrozavodsk	Vladimir Pronin
FC Lokomotiv St. Petersburg	Sergei Vedeneyev (until June); Lev Burchalkin (from June)
FC Trion-Volga Tver	Andrei Sergeyev
FC Mashinostroitel Pskov	Adel Kaneyev (until July); Yuri Veresov (from July)
FC Bulat Cherepovets	Aleksandr Sokolov
FC Zenit-2 St. Petersburg	Anatoli Zinchenko
FC Progress Chernyakhovsk	Aleksandr Fyodorov

Team	Head coach
FC Gatchina	Nikolai Gosudarenkov
FC Prometey-Dynamo St. Petersburg	Vladimir Goncharov
FC Kraneks Ivanovo	Aleksandr Chanov
FC Vest Kaliningrad	Yuri Beletskiy
FC Spartak Kostroma	Vyacheslav Skoropekin
FC Volochanin Vyshny Volochyok	Aleksandr Semyonov
FC Spartak-Arktikbank Arkhangelsk	Arkadi Kozak
FC Kosmos-Kirovets St. Petersburg	Lev Burchalkin (until June)

=== Standings ===
Pos	Team	Pld	W	D	L	GF	GA	GD	Pts	Relegation
1	FC Vympel Rybinsk	30	21	5	4	52	20	+32	47	
2	FC Erzi Petrozavodsk	30	19	6	5	49	22	+27	44	
3	FC Lokomotiv St. Petersburg	30	19	4	7	47	28	+19	42	
4	FC Trion-Volga Tver	30	17	6	7	56	26	+30	40	
5	FC Mashinostroitel Pskov	30	15	9	6	48	26	+22	39	Relegated to the 1994 Russian Third League
6	FC Bulat Cherepovets	30	12	9	9	46	32	+14	38 (Note: 5 bonus points?)	Relegated to the 1994 Russian Third League
7	FC Zenit-2 St. Petersburg	30	12	9	9	46	32	+14	33	Relegated to the 1994 Russian Third League
8	FC Progress Chernyakhovsk	30	13	5	12	33	28	+5	31	Relegated to the 1994 Russian Third League
9	FC Gatchina	30	11	9	10	37	24	+13	31	Relegated to the 1994 Russian Third League
10	FC Prometey-Dynamo St. Petersburg	30	11	4	15	27	41	−14	26	Relegated to the 1994 Russian Third League
11	FC Kraneks Ivanovo	30	9	8	13	32	39	−7	26	Relegated to the 1994 Russian Third League
12	FC Vest Kaliningrad	30	11	3	16	24	31	−7	25	Relegated to the 1994 Russian Third League
13	FC Spartak Kostroma	30	9	3	18	30	40	−10	21	Relegated to the 1994 Russian Third League
14	FC Volochanin Vyshny Volochyok	30	9	1	20	38	55	−17	19	Relegated to the 1994 Russian Third League
15	FC Spartak-Arktikbank Arkhangelsk	30	3	6	21	18	81	−63	12	Relegated to the 1994 Russian Third League
16	FC Kosmos-Kirovets St. Petersburg	30	2	2	26	11	77	−66	6	Relegated to the 1994 Russian Third League

Notes:

Notes:

1. FC Sputnik Kimry was excluded after playing 7 games and gaining 1 point. Their head coach was Aleksandr Shchetinin. All their results were discarded.
2. FC Kraneks Ivanovo was promoted from the Amateur Football League.
3. FC Zenit-2 St. Petersburg, FC Vest Kaliningrad and FC Spartak-Arktikbank Arkhangelsk played their first professional season.
4. FC Karelia Petrozavodsk renamed to FC Erzi Petrozavodsk.
5. FC Aleks Gatchina renamed to FC Gatchina.
6. FC Zvolma-Spartak Kostroma renamed to FC Spartak Kostroma.
7. FC Progress Chernyakhovsk, FC Spartak-Arktikbank Arkhangelsk and FC Kosmos-Kirovets St. Petersburg did not participate in any national-level competitions in 1994.

=== Top scorers ===
15 goals

- Aleksandr Panov (FC Zenit-2 St. Petersburg)

14 goals

- Sergei Boldyrev (FC Lokomotiv St. Petersburg)

13 goals

- Andrei Borisov (FC Trion-Volga Tver)
- Viktor Karman (FC Progress Chernyakhovsk)
- Sergei Rybakov (FC Gatchina)
- Aleksandr Selenkov (FC Erzi Petrozavodsk)

11 goals

- Mikhail Trukhlov (FC Vympel Rybinsk)

10 goals

- Roman Chevychelov (FC Spartak Kostroma)
- Sergei Molkov (FC Kraneks Ivanovo)
- Vladimir Rozhin (FC Vympel Rybinsk)
- Igor Ukhanov (FC Erzi Petrozavodsk)

== Zone 6 ==
Team	Head coach
FC Devon Oktyabrsky	Viktor Khaydarov
FC Metallurg Novotroitsk	Vyacheslav Ledovskikh
FC Vyatka Kirov	Aleksandr Sokovnin
FC Metiznik Magnitogorsk	Mikhail Pozin
FC KamAZavtotsentr Naberezhnye Chelny	Nikolai Nabok
FC KDS Samrau Ufa	Yuri Surenskiy
FC Gornyak Kachkanar	Viktor Shlyayev
FC SKD Samara	Viktor Kirsh
FC Zarya Krotovka	Aleksandr Druganin
FC Sodovik Sterlitamak	Viktor Zvyagin
FC Elektron Vyatskiye Polyany	Yuri Osin

Team	Head coach
FC Sibir Kurgan	Viktor Prozorov
FC Azamat Cheboksary	Gerold Drandov
FC Progress Zelenodolsk	Ildus Zagidullin
FC Energiya Chaykovsky	Sergei Kleymyonov
FC Uralelektromed Verkhnyaya Pyshma	Viktor Yerokhin
FC KAMAZ-d Naberezhnye Chelny	Yevgeni Chetverik / Ivan Butaliy
FC Gazovik Orenburg	Nikolai Yelanev
FC Dynamo Perm	Aleksandr Rogov
FC Volga Balakovo	Nikolai Romanov
FC Torpedo Izhevsk	Nikolai Gorshkov (until June)
FC Elektron Almetyevsk	Yuri Polezhayev

=== Standings ===
Pos	Team	Pld	W	D	L	GF	GA	GD	Pts	Relegation
1	FC Devon Oktyabrsky	42	28	10	4	84	22	+62	66	
2	FC Metallurg Novotroitsk	42	27	8	7	90	29	+61	62	
3	FC Vyatka Kirov	42	29	2	11	87	30	+57	60	
4	FC Metiznik Magnitogorsk	42	26	7	9	69	27	+42	59	Relegated to the 1994 Russian Third League
5	FC KamAZavtotsentr Naberezhnye Chelny	42	25	5	12	78	36	+42	55	Relegated to the 1994 Russian Third League
6	FC KDS Samrau Ufa	42	23	9	10	74	51	+23	55	Relegated to the 1994 Russian Third League
7	FC Gornyak Kachkanar	42	23	7	12	95	47	+48	53	Relegated to the 1994 Russian Third League
8	FC SKD Samara	42	23	7	12	73	48	+25	53	Relegated to the 1994 Russian Third League
9	FC Zarya Krotovka	42	23	5	14	91	52	+39	51	Relegated to the 1994 Russian Third League
10	FC Sodovik Sterlitamak	42	21	7	14	70	54	+16	49	Relegated to the 1994 Russian Third League
11	FC Elektron Vyatskiye Polyany	42	18	9	15	46	51	−5	45	Relegated to the 1994 Russian Third League
12	FC Sibir Kurgan	42	16	12	14	57	49	+8	44	Relegated to the 1994 Russian Third League
13	FC Azamat Cheboksary	42	17	6	19	67	57	+10	40	Relegated to the 1994 Russian Third League
14	FC Progress Zelenodolsk	42	16	7	19	58	58	0	39	Relegated to the 1994 Russian Third League
15	FC Energiya Chaykovsky	42	16	6	20	49	52	−3	38	Relegated to the 1994 Russian Third League
16	FC Uralelektromed Verkhnyaya Pyshma	42	12	8	22	60	63	−3	32	Relegated to the 1994 Russian Third League
17	FC KAMAZ-d Naberezhnye Chelny	42	13	5	24	43	107	−64	31	Relegated to the 1994 Russian Third League
18	FC Gazovik Orenburg	42	12	7	23	43	74	−31	31	Relegated to the 1994 Russian Third League
19	FC Dynamo Perm	42	8	6	28	47	91	−44	22	Relegated to the 1994 Russian Third League
20	FC Volga Balakovo	42	6	4	32	33	112	−79	16	Relegated to the 1994 Russian Third League
21	FC Torpedo Izhevsk	42	6	3	33	42	126	−84	15	Relegated to the 1994 Russian Third League
22	FC Elektron Almetyevsk	42	3	2	37	17	137	−120	8	Relegated to the 1994 Russian Third League

Notes:

1. FC Metiznik Magnitogorsk were promoted from the Amateur Football League, where they played in 1992 as FC Metiznik-Alternativa Magnitogorsk.
2. FC Uralelektromed Verkhnyaya Pyshma were promoted from the Amateur Football League, where they played in 1992 as FC MTsOP-Metallurg Verkhnyaya Pyshma.
3. FC SKD Samara, FC Progress Zelenodolsk, FC Dynamo Perm and FC Volga Balakovo did not play professionally in 1992.
4. FC KAMAZ-d Naberezhnye Chelny played their first professional season.
5. FC Avtopribor Oktyabrsky renamed to FC Devon Oktyabrsky.
6. FC Dynamo Kirov renamed to FC Vyatka Kirov.
7. FC KATs-Skif Naberezhnye Chelny renamed to FC KamAZavtotsentr Naberezhnye Chelny.
8. FC Gastello Ufa renamed to FC KDS Samrau Ufa.
9. FC Torpedo-UdGu Izhevsk renamed to FC Torpedo Izhevsk.
10. FC Uralelektromed Verkhnyaya Pyshma was converted to the reserve team of FC Uralmash Yekaterinburg called FC Uralmash-d Yekaterinburg in 1994.
11. FC Elektron Almetyevsk played in the Amateur Football League in 1994 as FC Devon Almetyevsk.
12. FC Azamat Cheboksary and FC Torpedo Izhevsk did not participate in any national-level competition in 1994.

=== Top scorers ===
31 goals

- Igor Syrov (FC Devon Oktyabrsky)

28 goals

- Vyacheslav Yevsin (FC Metallurg Novotroitsk)

25 goals

- Igor Palachyov (FC Zarya Krotovka)

24 goals

- Dmitri Yemelyanov (FC Zarya Krotovka)

23 goals

- Aleksandr Varnosov (FC Azamat Cheboksary)
- Maksim Kovalyov (FC Uralelektromed Verkhnyaya Pyshma)

22 goals

- Vladimir Korolyov (FC SKD Samara)

20 goals

- Yuri Adonyev (FC KamAZavtotsentr Naberezhnye Chelny)
- Oleg Kleshnin (FC Gornyak Kachkanar)
- Nikolai Kurilov (FC Vyatka Kirov)

== Zone 7 ==
Team	Head coach
FC Angara Angarsk	Oleg Izmaylov
FC Torpedo Rubtsovsk	Vladimir Vorzhev
FC Politekhnik-92 Barnaul	Aleksandr Zakhryapin
FC Dynamo Kemerovo	Boris Rusanov
FC Gornyak Gramoteino	Aleksandr Chalenko
FC Shakhtyor Artyom	Boris Kolokolov (until April)
FC Dynamo Omsk	Vyacheslav Martynov

Team	Head coach
FC Shakhtyor Kiselyovsk	Yevgeni Kultayev
FC Okean-d Nakhodka	Dmitri Kirgeyev
FC Agan Raduzhny	Aleksandr Shudrik
FC Lokomotiv Ussuriysk	Nikolai Snigir
FC Amur Blagoveshchensk	Rudolf Mkrtychev
FC Amur Komsomolsk-na-Amure	Sergei Shorkin

=== Standings ===
Pos	Team	Pld	W	D	L	GF	GA	GD	Pts	Relegation
1	FC Angara Angarsk	24	14	7	3	40	20	+20	35	
2	FC Torpedo Rubtsovsk	24	15	3	6	45	22	+23	33	
3	FC Politekhnik-92 Barnaul	24	11	5	8	31	24	+7	27	
4	FC Dynamo Kemerovo	24	10	7	7	29	19	+10	27	Relegated to the 1994 Russian Third League
5	FC Gornyak Gramoteino	24	8	11	5	29	22	+7	27	Relegated to the 1994 Russian Third League
6	FC Shakhtyor Artyom	24	10	6	8	37	29	+8	26	Relegated to the 1994 Russian Third League
7	FC Dynamo Omsk	24	8	9	7	24	25	−1	25	
8	FC Shakhtyor Kiselyovsk	24	9	5	10	29	23	+6	23	
9	FC Okean-d Nakhodka	24	8	6	10	25	33	−8	22	Relegated to the 1994 Russian Third League
10	FC Agan Raduzhny	24	5	10	9	15	25	−10	20	
11	FC Lokomotiv Ussuriysk	24	7	5	12	24	37	−13	19	Relegated to the 1994 Russian Third League
12	FC Amur Blagoveshchensk	24	5	7	12	28	47	−19	17	
13	FC Amur Komsomolsk-na-Amure	24	4	3	17	19	49	−30	11	

Notes:

1. FC Shakhtyor Kiselyovsk were promoted from the Amateur Football League, where they played in 1992 as FC Nika Kiselyovsk.
2. FC Lokomotiv Ussuriysk were promoted from the Amateur Football League.
3. FC Dynamo Omsk and FC Okean-d Nakhodka played their first professional season.
4. FC Aleks Angarsk renamed to FC Angara Angarsk.
5. FC Dynamo Kemerovo, FC Gornyak Gramoteino, FC Shakhtyor Artyom, FC Okean-d Nakhodka and FC Lokomotiv Ussuriysk did not participate in any national-level competitions in 1994.

=== Top scorers ===
20 goals

- Yevgeni Shipovskiy (FC Torpedo Rubtsovsk)

11 goals

- Sergei Sokolov (FC Shakhtyor Kiselyovsk)

10 goals

- Sergei Rogalevskiy (FC Gornyak Gramoteino)
- Andrei Semerenko (FC Amur Blagoveshchensk)

9 goals

- Andrei Dolgopolov (FC Angara Angarsk)
- Yuri Kuznetsov (FC Angara Angarsk)
- Yuri Sergiyenko (FC Shakhtyor Artyom)

8 goals

- Sergei Ageyev (FC Politekhnik-92 Barnaul)
- Sergei Bogochev (FC Dynamo Kemerovo)
- Leonid Kiyenko (FC Okean-d Nakhodka)

== See also ==
- 1993 Russian Top League
- 1993 Russian First League
