= List of football clubs in Russia =

This is a list of Russian football clubs that ever played at a professional level since 1992.

== A ==
FC Abinsk — FC Agan Raduzhny — FC Agidel Ufa — FC Agrokomplekt Ryazan — FC Akademiya Dimitrovgrad — FC Akademiya Togliatti— FC Alania-2 Vladikavkaz — FC Alania Vladikavkaz — FC Aleks Angarsk — FC Aleks Gatchina — FC Almaz Moscow — FC Alnas Almetyevsk — FC Altair-Khelling Derbent — FC Amkar Perm — FC Amur Blagoveshchensk — FC Amur-Energia Blagoveshchensk — FC Amur Komsomolsk-on-Amur — FC Anapa — FC Angara Angarsk — FC Angara Boguchany — FC Angusht Malgobek — FC Angusht Nazran — FC Anzhi-2 Kaspiysk — FC Anzhi Makhachkala — FC APK Azov — FC APK Morozovsk — FC Ararat Moscow — FC Argo Kaspiysk — FC Arsenal-2 Tula — FC Arsenal Tula — FC Arzamas — FC Asmaral Kislovodsk — FC Asmaral Moscow — FC Astrakhan — FC Astrateks Astrakhan — FC Atommash Volgodonsk — FC Avangard Kamyshin — FC Avangard Kolomna — FC Avangard-Kolos Taganrog — FC Avangard-Kortek Kolomna — FC Avangard Kursk — FC Avangard Podolsk — FC Avtodor-BMK Vladikavkaz — FC Avtodor-Olaf Vladikavkaz — FC Avtodor Vladikavkaz — FC Avtomobilist Noginsk — FC Avtomobilist Yuzhno-Sakhalinsk — FC Avtopribor Oktyabrsky — FC Avtozapchast Baksan — FC Azamat Cheboksary

== B ==
FC Balakovo — FC Baltika-2 Kaliningrad — FC Baltika Kaliningrad — FC Baltika-Tarko Kaliningrad — FC Bashinformsvyaz-Dynamo Ufa — FC Bataysk-2007 — FC Baysachnr Elista — FC Berezniki — FC Beshtau Lermontov — FC Beslan-FAYUR Beslan — FC Biokhimik-Mordovia Saransk — FC BSK Spirovo — FC Bulat Cherepovets

== C ==
FC Chelyabinsk — FC Chernomorets-2 Novorossiysk — FC Chernomorets Novorossiysk — FC Chertanovo Moscow – FC Chertanovo-2 Moscow — FC Chita — FC Chkalovets-1936 Novosibirsk — FC Chkalovets Novosibirsk — FC Chkalovets-Olympic Novosibirsk — FC CSKA-2 Moscow — FC CSKA Moscow — FC CSK VVS-Kristall Smolensk

Notable Extinct clubs

== D ==
FC Dagdizel Kaspiysk — FC Derbent — FC Devon Oktyabrsky — FC Diana Volzhsk — FC Dmitrov — FC Dnepr Smolensk — FC Don Novomoskovsk — FC Druzhba Budyonnovsk — FC Druzhba Maykop — FC Druzhba Yoshkar-Ola — FC Dynamo-2 Moscow — FC Dynamo Barnaul — FC Dynamo Bryansk — FC Dynamo-Gazovik Tyumen — FC Dynamo-Imamat Makhachkala — FC Dynamo Izhevsk — FC Dynamo Izobilny — FC Dynamo Kemerovo — FC Dynamo Kirov — FC Dynamo Kostroma — FC Dynamo Makhachkala — FC Dynamo-Mashinostroitel Kirov — FC Dynamo Mikhaylovka — FC Dynamo Moscow — FC Dynamo Omsk — FC Dynamo Perm — FC Dynamo Saint Petersburg — FC Dynamo Stavropol — FC Dynamo Tula — FC Dynamo Vologda — FC Dynamo Voronezh — FC Dynamo Yakutsk — FC Dynamo-Zhemchuzhina-2 Sochi

== E ==
FC Elektron Almetyevsk — FC Elektronika Nizhny Novgorod — FC Elektron Vyatskiye Polyany — FC Elista — FC Energetik Uren — FC Energia Chaykovsky — FC Energia Kamyshin — FC Energia Pyatigorsk — FC Energia-Tekstilshchik Kamyshin — FC Energia Ulyanovsk — FC Energia Velikiye Luki — FC Energia Volzhsky — FC Energomash Belgorod — FC Erzi Petrozavodsk — FC Erzu Grozny — FC Estel Ufa — FC Etalon Baksan

== F ==
FC Fabus Bronnitsy — FC Fakel Voronezh — FC Fakel-Voronezh Voronezh — FC FCS-73 Voronezh — FC FSA Voronezh — FC Fortuna Mytishchi

== G ==
FC Galaks St. Petersburg — FC Gastello Ufa — FC Gatchina — FC Gazovik-Gazprom Izhevsk — FC Gazovik Izhevsk — FC Gazovik Orenburg — FC Gekris Anapa — FC Gekris Novorossiysk — FC Gigant Grozny — FC Gigant Voskresensk — FC Gofrokarton Digora — FC Gornyak Gramoteino — FC Gornyak Kachkanar — FC Gornyak Kushva — FC Gornyak Uchaly — FC Gubkin

== I ==
FC Idel Kazan — FC Industriya Borovsk — FC Industriya Obninsk — FC Ingushetia Nazran — FC Interros Moscow — FC Irgiz Balakovo — FC Iriston Mozdok — FC Iriston Vladikavkaz — FC Irtysh-1946 Omsk — FC Irtysh Omsk — FC Irtysh Tobolsk — FC Iskra Engels — FC Iskra Novoaleksandrovsk — FC Iskra Smolensk — FC Istochnik Rostov-on-Don — FC Istra — FC Izhevsk — FC Izumrud Timashyovsk

== K ==
FC Kabardey-ZET Nizhny Cherek — FC Kaluga — FC KAC-SKIF Naberezhnye Chelny — FC KamAZavtocenter Naberezhnye Chelny — FC KamAZ-Chally Naberezhnye Chelny — FC KamAZ Naberezhnyye Chelny — FC Karelia-Erzi Petrozavodsk — FC Karelia Petrozavodsk — FC Kaspiy Kaspiysk — FC Kavkazkabel Prokhladny — FC Kavkaztransgaz-2005 Ryzdvyany — FC Kavkaztransgaz Izobilny — FC KDS Samrau Ufa — FC Khimik Belorechensk — FC Khimik Dankov — FC Khimik Dzerzhinsk — FC Khimik Koryazhma — FC Khimik Meleuz — FC Khimik Uvarovo — FC Khimki — FC Khopyor Balashov — FC Kinotavr Podolsk — FC Kolomna — FC Kolomna-820 — FC Kolos Bykovo — FC Kolos Krasnodar — FC Kommunalnik-Druzhba-d Maykop — FC Kosmos Dolgoprudny — FC Kosmos Elektrostal — FC Kosmos-Kirovets Saint Petersburg — FC Kosmos-Kvest Dolgoprudny — FC Kosmos Yegoryevsk — FC Kraneks Ivanovo — FC Krasnodar — FC Krasnodar-2000 — FC Krasnogvardeyets Moscow — FC Krasnoznamensk — FC Krasnoznamensk-Selyatino Krasnoznamensk — FC Kristall Dyatkovo — FC Kristall Neryungri — FC Kristall Sergach — FC Kristall Smolensk — FC Krivichi Velikiye Luki — FC Krylya Sovetov-2 Samara — FC Krylya Sovetov Samara — FC Krylya Sovetov-SOK Dimitrovgrad — FC Kuban Barannikovsky — FC Kuban Krasnodar — FC Kuban Slavyansk-na-Kubani — FC Kurgan — FC Kuzbass-Dynamo Kemerovo — FC KUZBASS Kemerovo – FC Kvant Obninsk

== L ==
FC Lada Dimitrovgrad — FC Lada-Energia Dimitrovgrad — FC Lada-Grad Dimitrovgrad — FC Lada-Simbirsk Dimitrovgrad — FC Lada-SOK Dimitrovgrad — FC Lada Togliatti — FC Lada-Togliatti-VAZ Togliatti — FC Leningradets Leningrad Oblast – FC Lisma-Mordovia Saransk — FC Lobnya-Alla — FC Lokomotiv-2 Moscow — FC Lokomotiv Chita — FC Lokomotiv Kaluga — FC Lokomotiv Liski — FC Lokomotiv Mineralnye Vody — FC Lokomotiv Moscow — FC Lokomotiv-M Serpukhov — FC Lokomotiv Nizhny Novgorod — FC Lokomotiv Saint Petersburg — FC Lokomotiv-Time Mineralnye Vody — FC Lokomotiv Ussuriysk — FC Lokomotiv Yelets — FC Lokomotiv-Zenit-2 Saint Petersburg — FC Lotto-MKM Moscow — FC Luch-Energia Vladivostok — FC Luch Tula — FC Luch Vladivostok — FC Lukhovitsy — FC Lukoil Chelyabinsk

== M ==
FC Maccabi Moscow — FC Magnitka Magnitogorsk — FC Mashinostroitel Pskov — FC Mashinostroitel Sergiyev Posad — FC Mashuk-KMV Pyatigorsk — FC Mashuk Pyatigorsk — FC MChS Selyatino — FC MEPHI Moscow — FC Metallurg Aldan — FC Metallurg Krasnoyarsk — FC Metallurg-Yenisey Krasnoyarsk — FC Metallurg Krasny Sulin — FC Metallurg-Kuzbass Novokuznetsk — FC Metallurg Lipetsk — FC Metallurg Magnitogorsk — FC Metallurg-Metiznik Magnitogorsk — FC Metallurg Novokuznetsk — FC Metallurg Novotroitsk — FC Metallurg Pikalyovo — FC Metallurg Stary Oskol — FC Metallurg-Oskol Stary Oskol — FC Metallurg Vyksa — FC Metallurg-ZapSib Novokuznetsk — FC Metiznik Magnitogorsk — FC Mezhdurechensk — FC MGU Saransk — FC MITOS Novocherkassk — FC Monolit Moscow — FC Mordovia Saransk — FC Moscow — FC Mosenergo Moscow — FC Moskovsky-Selyatino Selyatino — FC Mostovik-Primorye Ussuriysk — FC Mostransgaz Gazoprovod — FC Motor Prokopyevsk — FC Mozdok — FC MVD Rossii Moscow

== N ==
FC Nara-ShBFR Naro-Fominsk — FC Nara-Desna Naro-Fominsk — FC Nart Cherkessk — FC Nart Nartkala — FC Neftekhimik Nizhnekamsk — FC Neftyanik Bugulma — FC Neftyanik Pokhvistnevo — FC Neftyanik Ufa — FC Neftyanik Yaroslavl — FC Nemkom Krasnodar — FC Nika Krasny Sulin — FC Nika Moscow — FC Niva Slavyansk-na-Kubani — FC Nizhny Novgorod (2007) — FC Nosta Novotroitsk

== O ==
FC Oazis Yartsevo — FC Obninsk — FC Oka Kolomna — FC Okean Nakhodka — FC Olimpia Volgograd — FC Olimp Kislovodsk — FC Orekhovo Orekhovo-Zuyevo — FC Oryol

== P ==
FC Pele Moscow — FC Petrotrest Saint Petersburg — FC Pikalyovo — FC Planeta Bugulma — FC Politekhnik-92 Barnaul — FC Presnya Moscow — FC Progress Biysk — FC Progress Chernyakhovsk — FC Progress Zelenodolsk — FC Prometey-Dinamo Saint Petersburg — FC Pskov — FC Pskov-2000 — FC Pskov-747

== R ==
FC Radian-Baikal Irkutsk — FC Rassvet Troitskoye — FC Reformatsiya Abakan — FC Rekord Aleksandrov — FC Reutov — FC Ritm Alekseyevka — FC Ritm Belgorod — FC Roda Moscow — FC Rossia Moscow — FC Rostov — FC Rostselmash-2 Rostov-on-Don — FC Rostselmash Rostov-on-Don — FC Rotor-2 Mikhaylovka — FC Rotor-2 Volgograd — FC Rotor Volgograd — FC Rubin-2 Kazan — FC Rubin Kazan — FC Rubin-TAN Kazan — FC Rusichi Oryol — FC Ryazan — FC Ryazan-Agrokomplekt — FC Rybinsk

== S ==
FC Sakhalin Kholmsk — FC Sakhalin Yuzhno-Sakhalinsk — FC Salyut Belgorod — FC Salyut-Energiya Belgorod — FC Salyut Saratov — FC Salyut-YuKOS Belgorod — FC Samotlor-XXI Nizhnevartovsk — FC Saranskeksport Saransk — FC Saturn-1991 Saint Petersburg — FC Saturn-2 Moscow Oblast — FC Saturn-2 Ramenskoye — FC Saturn-2 Zhukovsky — FC Saturn Moscow Oblast (dissolved) — FC Saturn Naberezhnyye Chelny — FC Saturn Ramenskoye — FC Saturn-Ren-TV Moscow Oblast (current) — FC Saturn Yegoryevsk — FC Selenga Ulan-Ude — FC Sever Murmansk — FC Severstal Cherepovets — FC Shakhtyor Artyom — FC Shakhtyor Kiselyovsk — FC Shakhtyor Prokopyevsk — FC Shakhtyor Shakhty — FC Sheksna Cherepovets — FC Sherstyannik Nevinnomyssk — FC Shinnik Yaroslavl — FC Sibir-2 Novosibirsk — FC Sibir Kurgan — FC Sibir Novosibirsk — FC Sibiryak Bratsk — FC Sibur-Khimik Dzerzhinsk — FC SKA-Energia Khabarovsk — FC SKA Khabarovsk — FC SKA Rostov-on-Don — FC Skat-5s Yelabuga — FC SKD Samara — FC Slavyansk — FC Smena Komsomolsk-on-Amur — FC Smena Moscow — FC Smena-Saturn Saint Petersburg — FC Smena-Zenit Saint Petersburg — FC Smolensk — FC Sochi-04 — PFC Sochi – FC Sodovik Sterlitamak — FC Sokol-PZhD Saratov — FC Sokol Saratov — FC SOYUZ-Gazprom Izhevsk — FC Spartak-2 Moscow — FC Spartak-2 Nartkala — FC Spartak Alagir — FC Spartak-Alania Vladikavkaz — FC Spartak Anapa — FC Spartak-Arktikbank Arkhangelsk — FC Spartak-Bratskiy Yuzhny — FC Spartak Bryansk — FC Spartak Chelyabinsk — FC Spartak-Chukotka Moscow — FC Spartak Gorno-Altaysk — FC Spartak Kavkaztransgaz Izobilny — FC Spartak Kostroma — FC Spartak Kurgan — FC Spartak Lukhovitsy — FC Spartak Moscow — FC Spartak-MZK Ryazan — PFC Spartak Nalchik — FC Spartak Nizhny Novgorod — FC Spartak-Orekhovo Orekhovo-Zuyevo — FC Spartak Oryol — FC Spartak-Peresvet Bryansk — FC Spartak Ryazan — FC Spartak Rybnoye — FC Spartak Shchyolkovo — FC Spartak Tambov — FC Spartak-Telekom Shuya — FC Spartak-UGP Anapa — FC Spartak Vladikavkaz — FC Spartak Yoshkar-Ola — FC Sportakademklub Moscow — FC Sputnik Kimry — FC Start Yeysk — FC Stavropol — FC Stavropolye-2009 Stavropol — FC Stroitel Morshansk — FC Stroitel Ufa — FC Sudostroitel Astrakhan — FC SUO Moscow — FC Svetogorets Svetogorsk — FC Svetotekhnika Saransk

== T ==
FC Taganrog — FC Tekhinvest-M Moscow — FC Tekstilshchik Isheyevka — FC Tekstilshchik Ivanovo — FC Tekstilshchik Kamyshin — FC Tekstilshchik-Telekom Ivanovo — FC Terek Grozny — FC Titan Moscow — FC Titan Reutov — FC Titan Zheleznodorozhny — FC Tobol Kurgan — FC Togliatti — FC Tom Tomsk — FC Torgmash Lyubertsy — FC Torpedo-2 Moscow — FC Torpedo Adler — FC Torpedo-Alttrak Rubtsovsk — FC Torpedo Armavir — FC Torpedo Arzamas — FC Torpedo Georgiyevsk — FC Torpedo Izhevsk — FC Torpedo-Luzhniki Moscow — FC Torpedo-Metallurg Moscow — FC Torpedo Miass — FC Torpedo-MKB Mytishchi — FC Torpedo Moscow — FC Torpedo Mytishchi — FC Torpedo Pavlovo — FC Torpedo-RG Moscow — FC Torpedo Rubtsovsk — FC Torpedo Ryazan — FC Torpedo Taganrog — FC Torpedo-UdGu Izhevsk — FC Torpedo-Viktoriya Nizhny Novgorod — FC Torpedo Vladimir — FC Torpedo Volzhsky — FC Torpedo-ZIL Moscow — FC Tosno — FC TRASKO Moscow — FC Trestar Moscow — FC Trion-Volga Tver — FC Trubnik Kamensk-Uralsky — FC Turbostroitel Kaluga — FC Tyumen

== U ==
FC Ugay Uray — FC Uralan Elista — FC Uralan-Plus Moscow — FC UralAZ Miass — FC Uralelektromed Verkhnyaya Pyshma — FC Uralets Nizhny Tagil — FC Uralmash Yekaterinburg — FC Ural Yekaterinburg — FC Urartu Grozny

== V ==
FC Vaynakh Shali — FC Venets Gulkevichi — FC Vest Kaliningrad - FC Vidnoye — FC Viktor-Avangard Kolomna — FC Viktor-Gigant Voskresensk — FC Viktoriya Nazarovo — FC Vityaz Krymsk — FC Vityaz Podolsk — FC Volga Balakovo — FC Volga Nizhniy Novgorod — FC Volgar Astrakhan — FC Volgar-Gazprom Astrakhan — FC Volga Tver — FC Volga Ulyanovsk — FC Volgodonsk — FC Volgograd — FC Volochanin-89 Vyshny Volochyok — FC Volochanin-Ratmir Vyshniy Volochyok — FC Volochanin Vyshny Volochyok — FC Volzhanin Kineshma — FC Vyatka Kirov — FC Vympel Rybinsk

== Y ==
FC Yelets — FC Yudzhin Samara — FC Yunit Samara

== Z ==
FC Zarya Krotovka — FC Zarya Leninsk-Kuznetsky — FC Zavodchanin Saratov — FC Zavolzhye Engels — FC Zelenograd — FC Zenit-2 Saint Petersburg — FC Zenit Chelyabinsk — FC Zenit Izhevsk — FC Zenit Penza — FC Zenit Saint Petersburg — FC Zhemchuzhina-2 Sochi — FC Zhemchuzhina Budyonnovsk — FC Zhemchuzhina Sochi — FC Znamya Truda Orekhovo-Zuyevo — FC Zodiak Stary Oskol — FC Zvezda Gorodishche — FC Zvezda Irkutsk — FC Zvezda Perm — FC Zvezda Ryazan — FC Zvezda Serpukhov
