= 1991 Soviet Second League B =

Second Lower League
- Season: 1991
- Champions: 10 teams

1991 Soviet Lower Second League was the second and the last season of the Soviet Second League B since its reestablishing in 1990. The league was divided into 10 zones (groups) with 217 participants.

At least four out those 10 zones were part of republican championships. Among those republics were Ukrainian SSR, Armenian SSR, Azerbaijani SSR, and Kazakh SSR. Five more zones were dominated majorly by clubs of the Russian SFSR and one more zone was a collective competition among clubs of the Central Asia less the Kazakh SSR.

Four former Soviet republics that technically were still part of the Soviet Union conducted separate competitions. Among those republics were Baltic republics Estonian SSR, Latvian SSR, and Lithuanian SSR as well as Georgian SSR. An attempt to conduct separate Soviet Baltic League that conducted in 1990 fell through and separate Baltic clubs (predominantly from the Latvian SSR) were allowed to compete in regular league competitions of the Soviet Union.

== Political situation ==
The Soviet football competitions were conducted with the ongoing Nagorno-Karabakh conflict between the Soviet Armenia and the Soviet Azerbaijan. Because of that some clubs that territorially were located in the Azerbaijani SSR (i.e. Artsakh Stepanakert from Stepanakert) were nonetheless allowed to compete in republican championship of the Armenian SSR.

Following the end of the football season, in the Moldavian SSR started a hot phase of the Transnistria conflict that was initiated by Soviet authorities led by Igor Smirnov and supported by the Odesa Military District authorities. At the same time political situations in Tajikistan and Georgia following their first presidential elections were deteriorating and escalated into so called Georgian Civil War and Tajikistani Civil War with a direct intervention of the Russian Armed Forces.

In December 1991 there was signed Belavezha Accords between representatives of Russia, Belarus, and Ukraine.

== Final standings ==
=== I Zone (Ukraine) ===
Pos	Team	Pld	W	D	L	GF	GA	GD	Pts	Promotion or relegation
1	Naftovyk Okhtyrka (C, P)	50	29	17	4	87	34	+53	75	Promoted
2	Prykarpattia Ivano-Frankivsk (P)	50	31	9	10	86	43	+43	71	Promoted
3	Kolos Nikopol	50	28	13	9	86	45	+41	69	
4	Veres Rivne	50	28	13	9	67	38	+29	69	
5	Pryladyst Mukachevo	50	24	14	12	67	42	+25	62	
6	Krystal Kherson	50	23	15	12	82	60	+22	61	
7	Dynamo Bila Tserkva	50	25	9	16	69	50	+19	59	
8	Avtomobilist Sumy	50	20	14	16	51	40	+11	54	
9	Temp Shepetivka (P)	50	19	15	16	64	53	+11	53	Promoted
10	Polissya Zhytomyr	50	22	7	21	64	66	−2	51	
11	Kryvbas Kryvyi Rih	50	19	13	18	75	64	+11	51	
12	Shakhtar Pavlohrad	50	19	12	19	84	66	+18	50	
13	Desna Chernihiv	50	20	9	21	59	59	0	49	
14	Podillya Khmelnytskyi	50	18	13	19	54	55	−1	49	
15	Zakarpattia Uzhhorod	50	20	8	22	59	64	−5	48	
16	Karpaty Kamyanka-Buzka	50	15	15	20	48	55	−7	45	
17	Stal Kommunarsk	50	15	15	20	58	73	−15	45	
18	Dnipro Cherkasy	50	17	10	23	47	59	−12	44	
19	Khimik Sievierodonetsk	50	15	13	22	52	70	−18	43	
20	Vahonobudivnyk Stakhanov	50	17	8	25	56	75	−19	42	
21	SKA Kyiv	50	11	20	19	48	60	−12	42	
22	Chaika Sevastopol	50	13	15	22	58	77	−19	41	
23	Mayak Ochakiv	50	15	10	25	51	76	−25	40	
24	Okean Kerch (R)	50	15	10	25	49	72	−23	40	Relegated
25	Zirka Kirovohrad (R)	50	12	13	25	55	90	−35	37	Relegated
26	Mayak Kharkiv (R)	50	0	10	40	31	121	−90	10	Relegated

(C) Champions; (P) Promoted; (R) Relegated

=== II Zone (Armenia) ===
Pos	Team (Note: The Zone included clubs from Nagorno-Karabakh, Azerbaijan.)	Pld	W	D	L	GF	GA	GD	Pts
1	Syunik Kapan (Note: Kapan changed name to Syunik Kapan.) (C)	38	32	2	4	107	40	+67	66
2	Shirak Gyumri (Note: Leninakan City were renamed as Gyumri.)	38	30	4	4	112	24	+88	64
3	Artsakh Stepanakert	38	26	5	7	98	45	+53	57
4	Spitak	38	25	3	10	112	61	+51	53
5	Araks Hoktemberyan	38	23	4	11	78	63	+15	50
6	Koshkagorts Yerevan	38	20	2	16	84	67	+17	42
7	Malatia Yerevan	38	16	8	14	59	54	+5	40
8	Yerazank Stepanakert	38	17	4	17	67	67	0	38
9	FIMA Yerevan	38	17	3	18	58	64	−6	37
10	Pahatsoyagorts Noyemberyan	38	15	5	18	51	64	−13	35
11	Zvartnots Echmiadzin	38	14	4	20	59	76	−17	32
12	Impuls Dilijan	38	12	7	19	60	81	−21	31
13	Zoravan Yegvard	38	12	7	19	61	70	−9	31
14	Zangezur Goris	38	12	5	21	52	81	−29	29
15	Nairi Yerevan	38	10	9	19	60	80	−20	29
16	Moush Charentsavan	38	10	9	19	47	76	−29	29
17	Alashkert Martuni	38	12	4	22	51	79	−28	28
18	Nig Aparan	38	10	6	22	46	67	−21	26
19	Kasakh Ashtarak	38	8	10	20	35	71	−36	26
20	Almast Yerevan	38	7	3	28	36	103	−67	17

(C) Champions

=== III Zone (Azerbaijan) ===
Pos	Team	Pld	W	D	L	GF	GA	GD	Pts	
1	Khazar Sumgait	38	28	5	5	112	24	+88	61	
2	Stroitel Baku	38	22	10	6	82	32	+50	54	
3	Avtomobilist Yevlakh	38	21	10	7	76	28	+48	52	
4	Pambigchi Barda	38	22	7	9	60	34	+26	51	
5	Kyur Mingechaur	38	18	11	9	67	33	+34	47	
6	Araz Baku	38	16	14	8	48	33	+15	46	
7	FC Gyanjlik Navagi	38	18	7	13	61	47	+14	43	
8	FC Dashgin Zakatali	38	20	2	16	69	63	+6	42	
9	FC Avey Akstafa	38	18	4	16	48	42	+6	40	[+]
10	FC Vilyash Massali	38	14	10	14	54	53	+1	38	
11	FC Khazar Lenkoran	38	17	3	18	45	54	−9	37	
12	FC Shahdag Kusari	38	15	7	16	52	57	−5	37	
13	FC Agrofirma Kuba (Note: Shahdag Kuba changed name to Agrofirma.)	38	15	7	16	44	53	−9	37	
14	FC Inshaatchi Shemaha	38	14	6	18	49	59	−10	34	
15	FC Azeri Baku	38	12	10	16	51	54	−3	34	[+]
16	FC Stroitel Sabirabad	38	14	4	20	37	69	−32	32	
17	FC MCOP-Dinamo Baku	38	10	10	18	35	41	−6	30	
18	FC Shirvan Kyurdamir	38	10	6	22	33	86	−53	26	
19	FC Plastik Salyani	38	3	6	29	24	98	−74	12	
20	FC Badamli Nahichevan (Note: Araz Nahichevan changed name to Badamli.)	38	2	3	33	20	107	−87	7	

=== IV Zone (South Russia) ===
Pos	Team	Pld	W	D	L	GF	GA	GD	Pts	
1	Zhemchuzhina Sochi	42	27	10	5	91	33	+58	64	[+] [RUS 1W]
2	Uralan Elista	42	26	5	11	62	44	+18	57	[RUS 1W]
3	Asmaral Kislovodsk	42	25	3	14	67	46	+21	53	[+] [RUS 1W]
4	Etalon Baksan	42	23	6	13	64	38	+26	52	[+] [RUS 2]
5	Atommash Volgodonsk	42	20	11	11	59	38	+21	51	[RUS 1C]
6	Khimik Belorechensk	42	21	8	13	73	45	+28	50	[RUS 2]
7	FC Signal Izobilny	42	18	12	12	54	47	+7	48	[RUS 2]
8	FC Dinamo Makhachkala	42	23	1	18	82	62	+20	47	
9	FC Zvezda Gorodishche	42	20	6	16	70	47	+23	46	[RUS 2]
10	FC SKA Rostov-na-Donu	42	19	8	15	62	40	+22	46	[-] [RUS 2]
11	FC Volgar Astrakhan	42	19	7	16	62	50	+12	45	[-] [RUS 2]
12	FC Mashuk Pyatigorsk	42	16	12	14	56	40	+16	44	[-] [RUS 2]
13	FC Avtodor Vladikavkaz	42	18	6	18	60	63	−3	42	[RUS 2]
14	FC Druzhba Budyonnovsk	42	16	10	16	59	57	+2	42	[+] [RUS 2]
15	FC Lokomotiv Mineralnyye Vody	42	15	10	17	51	61	−10	40	[RUS 2]
16	FC Torpedo Armavir	42	15	8	19	46	56	−10	38	[RUS 2]
17	FC Vaynah Shali	42	13	6	23	46	80	−34	32	[+] [RUS 2]
18	FC Remontnik Prokhladny	42	11	10	21	49	71	−22	32	[RUS 2]
19	FC Kuban Timashevsk	42	10	9	23	34	69	−35	29	[+]
20	FC Sherstyanik Nevinnomyssk	42	11	4	27	39	70	−31	26	[+] [RUS 2]
21	FC Kaspiy Kaspiysk	42	6	10	26	32	98	−66	22	[+] [RUS 2]
22	FC Dinamo Gagra	42	8	2	32	37	100	−63	18	[+]

=== V Zone (Center) ===
Pos	Team	Pld	W	D	L	GF	GA	GD	Pts	
1	FC Spartak Anapa	42	28	7	7	79	26	+53	63	[RUS 1W]
2	FC Svetotekhnika Saransk	42	25	7	10	76	35	+41	57	[RUS 1C]
3	FC Bujak Komrat	42	21	11	10	58	43	+15	53	[+] [MDA]
4	FC Energomash Belgorod (Note: Salyut Belgorod changed name to Energomash.)	42	22	8	12	68	38	+30	52	[RUS 1W]
5	FC Zarya Kaluga	42	21	8	13	67	47	+20	50	[-]
6	FC Rhythm Belgorod	42	21	8	13	58	47	+11	50	[+] [RUS 2]
7	FC Kuban Barannikovskiy	42	19	11	12	63	41	+22	49	[RUS 2]
8	FC Avangard Kursk	42	22	4	16	56	48	+8	48	[RUS 2]
9	FC Shakhtyor Shakhty	42	20	8	14	78	65	+13	48	[RUS 2]
10	FC Start Yeisk	42	18	10	14	61	46	+15	46	[RUS 2]
11	FC Oka Kolomna	42	15	16	11	61	47	+14	46	[RUS 2]
12	FC Arsenal Tula	42	19	7	16	54	41	+13	45	[RUS 2]
13	FC Spartak Tambov	42	19	7	16	57	49	+8	45	[RUS 2]
14	FC Khimik Dzerzhinsk	42	14	11	17	46	53	−7	39	[RUS 2]
15	FC Rus Volgograd	42	16	6	20	43	71	−28	38	[+]
16	FC Buran Voronezh	42	14	9	19	45	43	+2	37	
17	FC Avangard Kamyshin	42	13	10	19	50	62	−12	36	[+] [RUS 2]
18	FC Spartak Oryol	42	13	9	20	56	61	−5	35	[RUS 2]
19	FC Torpedo Mytishchi	42	13	7	22	48	65	−17	33	[+] [RUS 2]
20	FC Torgmash Lyubertsy	42	8	6	28	42	92	−50	22	[RUS 2]
21	FC Metallurg Krasny Sulin	42	8	4	30	25	81	−56	20	[+] [RUS 2]
22	FC Niva Slavyansk-na-Kubani	42	5	2	35	30	120	−90	12	[RUS 2]

=== VI Zone (North Russia and Moscow) ===
Pos	Team	Pld	W	D	L	GF	GA	GD	Pts	
1	FC Prometheus-Dinamo S-Peterburg	42	29	7	6	72	25	+47	65	[RUS 1W]
2	FC Textilshchik Ivanovo	42	28	6	8	69	36	+33	64 (Note: 2 bonus points?)	[RUS 1W]
3	FC RAF Jelgava	42	28	6	8	71	39	+32	62	[LVA]
4	FC Dinamo Vologda	42	26	10	6	75	38	+37	62	[RUS 1W]
5	FC Baltika Kaliningrad	42	24	9	9	72	45	+27	57	[-] [RUS 2]
6	FC Volzhanin Kineshma	42	23	11	8	59	30	+29	57	[RUS 2]
7	FC Iskra Smolensk	42	21	10	11	52	35	+17	52	[-] [RUS 2]
8	FC Bulat Cherepovets (Note: Khimik Cherepovets changed name to Bulat.)	42	21	9	12	48	34	+14	51	[RUS 2]
9	FC Mashinostroitel Pskov	42	17	10	15	54	40	+14	44	[RUS 2]
10	FC Prometheus Lyubertsy	42	15	14	13	47	41	+6	44	[+]
11	FC Znamya Truda Orekhovo-Zuyevo	42	16	11	15	46	34	+12	43	[RUS 2]
12	FC Kirovets Sankt-Peterburg	42	13	14	15	36	38	−2	40	[RUS 2]
13	FC Saturn Ramenskoye	42	12	15	15	35	44	−9	39	[RUS 2]
14	FC Progress Chernyakhovsk	42	13	9	20	44	54	−10	35	[+] [RUS 2]
15	FC Spartak Petrozavodsk	42	11	12	19	33	48	−15	34	[RUS 2]
16	FC Gomselmash Gomel	42	13	5	24	40	54	−14	31	[BLR]
17	FC Spartak Kostroma	42	9	13	20	27	57	−30	31	[RUS 2]
18	FC Zvezda Moskva	42	10	9	23	41	71	−30	29	[RUS 2]
19	FC Presnya Moskva	42	8	8	26	28	64	−36	24	[+] [RUS 2]
20	FC Dinamo-2 Moskva	40	7	10	23	37	58	−21	24	[RUS 2]
21	FC Volochanin Vyshniy Volochok	42	7	9	26	22	67	−45	23	[+] [RUS 2]
22	FC CSKA-2 Moskva	42	4	5	33	25	81	−56	13	[RUS 2]

=== VII Zone (Ural) ===
Pos	Team	Pld	W	D	L	GF	GA	GD	Pts	
1	FC Rubin Kazan	42	30	8	4	79	20	+59	68	[RUS 1C]
2	FC Metallurg Magnitogorsk	42	25	10	7	73	31	+42	60	[RUS 1C]
3	FC Uralets Nizhniy Tagil	42	27	5	10	89	33	+56	59	[RUS 1C]
4	FC Torpedo Miass	42	25	7	10	74	32	+42	57	[RUS 1C]
5	FC Druzhba Yoshkar-Ola	42	24	9	9	70	36	+34	57	[RUS 1C]
6	FC Zenit Chelyabinsk	42	25	6	11	74	45	+29	56	[RUS 1C]
7	FC Dinamo Kirov	42	23	9	10	67	33	+34	55	[RUS 1C]
8	FC Sibir Kurgan (Note: Zauralye Kurgan changed name to Sibir.)	42	20	9	13	46	31	+15	49	[RUS 2]
9	FC Neftekhimik Nizhnekamsk	42	20	6	16	52	36	+16	46	[+] [RUS 2]
10	FC Gazovik Izhevsk	42	19	6	17	58	49	+9	44	[+] [RUS 2]
11	FC Azamat Cheboksary (Note: Stal Cheboksary changed name to Azamat.)	42	18	8	16	62	46	+16	44	[RUS 2]
12	FC Znamya Arzamas	42	16	11	15	56	49	+7	43	[RUS 2]
13	FC Kauchuk Sterlitamak	42	16	7	19	52	70	−18	39	[RUS 2]
14	FC Electron Vyatskiye Polyany	42	13	11	18	40	54	−14	37	[+] [RUS 2]
15	FC Avtopribor Oktyabrskiy	42	13	9	20	38	59	−21	35	[RUS 2]
16	FC Metallurg Novotroitsk	42	14	5	23	45	78	−33	33	[+] [RUS 2]
17	FC Zenit Penza (Note: Granite Penza changed name to Zenit.)	42	12	9	21	50	55	−5	33	[RUS 2]
18	FC Gazovik Orenburg	42	11	10	21	41	74	−33	32	[RUS 2]
19	FC Bashselmash Neftekamsk	42	7	8	27	32	77	−45	22	
20	FC Sokol Sarapul	42	6	10	26	31	79	−48	22	[+]
21	FC Zarya Podgorny	42	5	9	28	20	80	−60	19	[RUS 2]
22	FC EVM Ruzayevka	42	5	4	33	27	109	−82	14	[+]

=== VIII Zone (Kazakhstan) ===
Pos	Team	Pld	W	D	L	GF	GA	GD	Pts	
1	FC Aktyubinets Aktyubinsk	36	26	7	3	63	23	+40	59	
2	FC Spartak Semipalatinsk	36	26	6	4	79	22	+57	58	
3	FC Kustanayets Kustanay	36	25	6	5	82	25	+57	56	
4	FC Kaysar Kzil-Orda	36	24	5	7	92	28	+64	53	[-]
5	FC Metallurg Jezkazgan (Note: Jezkazganets Jezkazgan changed name to Metallurg.)	36	22	5	9	66	42	+24	49	
6	FC Gornyak Khromtau	36	21	5	10	74	27	+47	47	
7	FC Alay Osh	36	19	4	13	51	51	0	42	[KGZ]
8	FC Metallist Petropavlovsk	36	16	7	13	57	50	+7	39	
9	FC Bulat Temirtau	36	15	9	12	45	35	+10	39	
10	FC Metallurg Yermak	36	16	4	16	63	59	+4	36	
11	FC Kokshetau Kokchetav (Note: Spartak Kokchetav changed name to Kokshetau.)	36	14	8	14	45	50	−5	36	
12	FC Montazhnik Turkestan	36	11	7	18	53	72	−19	29	
13	FC Arman Kentau	36	11	5	20	53	77	−24	27	[+]
14	FC Dostuk Sokuluk	36	10	6	20	31	52	−21	26	[KGZ]
15	FC Aktau (Note: Shevchenko City were renamed as Aktau.)	36	9	6	21	42	72	−30	24	
16	FC Olimpia Alma-Ata (Note: SKIF Alma-Ata changed name to Olimpia.)	36	8	7	21	42	74	−32	23	
17	FC Uralets Uralsk	36	8	2	26	39	71	−32	18	
18	FC Hosilot Farhor	36	5	4	27	27	105	−78	14	[+] [TJK]
19	FC Ak-Kanat Uzun-Agach	36	4	1	31	28	97	−69	9	

=== IX Zone (Central Asia) ===
Pos	Team	Pld	W	D	L	GF	GA	GD	Pts	
1	Traktor Tashkent	50	33	9	8	103	43	+60	75	[UZB]
2	Umid Tashkent	50	29	11	10	93	51	+42	69	[+] [UZB]
3	Khujand (Note: Leninabad City were renamed as Hujand.)	50	27	13	10	108	53	+55	67	[TJK]
4	Chirchik	50	27	7	16	92	64	+28	61	[UZB]
5	Zarafshan Navoi	50	26	9	15	67	44	+23	61	[-] [UZB]
6	Kimegar Almalyk (Note: Metallurg Almalyk changed name to Kimegar.)	50	25	10	15	96	61	+35	60	[UZB]
7	Shahrihonchi Shahrihan	50	25	9	16	106	71	+35	59	[+] [UZB]
8	Marokand Samarkand (Note: Dinamo Samarkand changed name to Marokand.)	50	25	8	17	92	69	+23	58	[UZB]
9	FC Regar Tursun-Zade	50	26	5	19	74	72	+2	57	[TJK]
10	FC Nebitchi Nebit-Dag	50	25	7	18	83	54	+29	57	[TKM]
11	FC Aral Nukus	50	24	6	20	68	64	+4	54	[UZB]
12	FC Bagdodchi Bagdad	50	23	8	19	81	83	−2	54	[+] [UZB]
13	FC Navruz Andizhan (Note: Spartak Andizhan changed name to Navruz.)	50	22	10	18	76	61	+15	54	[-] [UZB]
14	FC Ahal Akdashayak	50	24	4	22	75	69	+6	52	[TKM]
15	FC Yangiyer	50	20	10	20	77	72	+5	50	[UZB]
16	FC Yeshlik Turakurgan	50	22	4	24	86	84	+2	48	[UZB]
17	FC Sokhibkor Khalkabad	50	19	10	21	65	73	−8	48	[UZB]
18	FC Sverdlovets Tashkent Region	50	17	14	19	75	72	+3	48	[UZB]
19	FC Merv Mary	50	17	7	26	59	81	−22	41	[TKM]
20	FC Geolog Karshi	50	15	8	27	58	91	−33	38	[UZB]
21	FC Gulistonchi Gulistan	50	13	10	27	42	89	−47	36	[+] [UZB]
22	FC Binokor Bukhara	50	15	5	30	34	85	−51	35	[+] [UZB]
23	FC Turtkulchi Turtkul (Note: Tselinnik Turtkul changed name to Turtkulchi.)	50	13	8	29	61	89	−28	34	[UZB]
24	FC Naryn Khakkulabad	50	10	13	27	43	80	−37	33	[+] [UZB]
25	FC Konchi Angren (Note: Shakhtyor Angren changed name to Konchi.)	50	11	7	32	53	97	−44	29	[UZB]
26	FC Kuruvchi Urgench (Note: Jeyhun Urgench changed name to Kuruvchi.)	50	7	8	35	36	131	−95	22	[UZB]

=== X Zone (Russia Far East) ===
Pos	Team	Pld	W	D	L	GF	GA	GD	Pts	
1	Lokomotiv Chita	34	21	10	3	46	12	+34	52	[RUS 1E]
2	SKA Khabarovsk	34	23	3	8	58	22	+36	49	[RUS 1E]
3	Irtysh Omsk	34	20	7	7	51	21	+30	47	[-] [RUS 1E]
4	Chkalovets Novosibirsk	34	19	8	7	60	31	+29	46	[RUS 1E]
5	Metallurg Novokuznetsk	34	19	6	9	51	34	+17	44	[RUS 1E]
6	Tom Tomsk	34	16	9	9	43	29	+14	41	[RUS 1E]
7	Metallurg Krasnoyarsk (Note: Avtomobilist Krasnoyarsk changed name to Metallurg.)	34	16	8	10	51	31	+20	40	[RUS 1E]
8	Luch Vladivostok	34	15	10	9	37	28	+9	40	[RUS 1E]
9	Vulkan Petropavlovsk-Kamchatskiy	34	12	9	13	36	39	−3	33	
10	Dinamo Yakutsk	34	12	9	13	28	38	−10	33	[+] [RUS 1E]
11	Amur Komsomolsk-na-Amure	34	8	12	14	32	38	−6	28	[RUS 1E]
12	Selenga Ulan-Ude	34	10	7	17	33	45	−12	27	[RUS 1E]
13	Dinamo Kemerovo	34	8	10	16	18	31	−13	26	[+] [RUS 2]
14	Angara Angarsk	34	8	7	19	29	49	−20	23	[RUS 2]
15	Torpedo Rubtsovsk	34	8	7	19	38	59	−21	23	[RUS 2]
16	Shakhtyor Artyom	34	8	5	21	27	58	−31	21	[+] [RUS 2]
17	Shakhtyor Leninsk-Kuznetskiy	34	8	5	21	24	56	−32	21	[RUS 2]
18	Progress Biysk	34	5	8	21	19	60	−41	18	[RUS 2]

== See also ==
- Soviet Second League B
