= 1990 Soviet Second League B =

Soviet football league season

1990 Soviet Lower Second League was the first season of the Soviet Second League B since its reestablishing in 1990. As in the last season it was divided into 10 zones (groups).

== Final standings ==
=== I Zone (Ukraine) ===
| Pos | Team | Pld | W | D | L | GF | GA | GD | Pts | Promotion |
|---|---|---|---|---|---|---|---|---|---|---|
| 1 | Torpedo Zaporizhzhia | 36 | 23 | 8 | 5 | 53 | 25 | +28 | 54 | Promoted |
| 2 | Sudnobudivnyk Mykolaiv | 36 | 24 | 5 | 7 | 60 | 31 | +29 | 53 | Promoted |
| 3 | Avanhard Rivne | 36 | 21 | 11 | 4 | 53 | 27 | +26 | 53 | |
| 4 | Polissya Zhytomyr | 36 | 23 | 5 | 8 | 53 | 27 | +26 | 51 | |
| 5 | Krystal Kherson | 36 | 18 | 9 | 9 | 61 | 44 | +17 | 45 | |
| 6 | Naftovyk Okhtyrka | 36 | 17 | 10 | 9 | 45 | 29 | +16 | 44 | |
| 7 | Prykarpattia Ivano-Frankivsk | 36 | 15 | 8 | 13 | 32 | 32 | 0 | 38 | |
| 8 | Shakhtar Pavlohrad | 36 | 14 | 9 | 13 | 37 | 39 | −2 | 37 | |
| 9 | Dynamo Bila Tserkva | 36 | 14 | 7 | 15 | 37 | 38 | −1 | 35 | |
| 10 | Kolos Nikopol | 36 | 13 | 9 | 14 | 43 | 40 | +3 | 35 | |
| 11 | SKA Kyiv | 36 | 14 | 4 | 18 | 40 | 41 | −1 | 32 | |
| 12 | Desna Chernihiv | 36 | 13 | 6 | 17 | 35 | 39 | −4 | 32 | |
| 13 | Chaika Sevastopol | 36 | 11 | 8 | 17 | 35 | 46 | −11 | 30 | |
| 14 | Podillya Khmelnytskyi | 36 | 10 | 10 | 16 | 37 | 46 | −9 | 30 | |
| 15 | Kryvbas Kryvyi Rih | 36 | 10 | 6 | 20 | 40 | 53 | −13 | 26 | |
| 16 | Dnipro Cherkasy | 36 | 8 | 7 | 21 | 26 | 48 | −22 | 23 | |
| 17 | Okean Kerch | 36 | 7 | 9 | 20 | 31 | 55 | −24 | 23 | |
| 18 | Mayak Kharkiv | 36 | 6 | 10 | 20 | 19 | 48 | −29 | 22 | |
| 19 | Zirka Kirovohrad | 36 | 7 | 7 | 22 | 32 | 61 | −29 | 21 | |

=== II Zone (Armenia) ===
| Pos | Team | Pld | W | D | L | GF | GA | GD | Pts | Promotion |
|---|---|---|---|---|---|---|---|---|---|---|
| 1 | FC Ararat-2 Yerevan (C) | 22 | 17 | 3 | 2 | 77 | 25 | +52 | 37 | Promoted |
| 2 | Araks Hoktemberyan | 22 | 15 | 5 | 2 | 68 | 27 | +41 | 35 | |
| 3 | Spitak | 22 | 13 | 3 | 6 | 55 | 31 | +24 | 29 | |
| 4 | Artsakh Stepanakert | 22 | 9 | 5 | 8 | 37 | 28 | +9 | 23 | |
| 5 | Kapan | 22 | 10 | 2 | 10 | 33 | 36 | −3 | 22 | |
| 6 | Malatia Yerevan | 22 | 9 | 2 | 11 | 39 | 45 | −6 | 20 | |
| 7 | Zvartnots Echmiadzin | 22 | 8 | 4 | 10 | 31 | 45 | −14 | 20 | |
| 8 | Koshkagorts-Nairi Yerevan | 22 | 7 | 4 | 11 | 33 | 53 | −20 | 18 | |
| 9 | Pahatsoyagorts Noyemberyan | 22 | 6 | 5 | 11 | 21 | 51 | −30 | 17 | |
| 10 | Zoravan Yegvard | 22 | 5 | 6 | 11 | 36 | 48 | −12 | 16 | |
| 11 | FIMA Yerevan | 22 | 4 | 7 | 11 | 28 | 57 | −29 | 15 | |
| 12 | Nairi Yerevan | 22 | 4 | 4 | 14 | 34 | 46 | −12 | 12 | |

(C) Champions

=== III Zone (Azerbaijan) ===
| Pos | Team | Pld | W | D | L | GF | GA | GD | Pts | Promotion |
|---|---|---|---|---|---|---|---|---|---|---|
| 1 | Karabakh Agdam | 34 | 25 | 7 | 2 | 79 | 18 | +61 | 57 | Promoted |
| 2 | FC Khazar Sumgait | 34 | 21 | 5 | 8 | 102 | 41 | +61 | 47 | |
| 3 | FC Araz Nakhichevan | 34 | 20 | 7 | 7 | 59 | 21 | +38 | 47 | |
| 4 | FC Khazar Lenkoran | 34 | 20 | 3 | 11 | 65 | 42 | +23 | 43 | |
| 5 | FC Stroitel Baku | 34 | 18 | 6 | 10 | 37 | 35 | +2 | 42 | [+] |
| 6 | FC Araz Baku | 34 | 14 | 10 | 10 | 48 | 41 | +7 | 38 | [+] |
| 7 | FC Pambigchi Barda | 34 | 16 | 3 | 15 | 45 | 52 | −7 | 35 | [+] |
| 8 | FC Inshaatchi Shemakha | 34 | 14 | 5 | 15 | 34 | 50 | −16 | 33 | [+] |
| 9 | FC Shakhdag Kusari | 34 | 14 | 4 | 16 | 53 | 54 | −1 | 32 | [+] |
| 10 | FC Kyur Mingechaur | 34 | 13 | 6 | 15 | 41 | 42 | −1 | 32 | [+] |
| 11 | FC Stroitel Sabirabad | 34 | 13 | 6 | 15 | 52 | 59 | −7 | 32 | [+] |
| 12 | FC Shakhdag Kuba | 34 | 9 | 9 | 16 | 43 | 67 | −24 | 27 | [+] |

=== IV Zone (South Russia) ===
| Pos | Team | Pld | W | D | L | GF | GA | GD | Pts | Promotion |
|---|---|---|---|---|---|---|---|---|---|---|
| 1 | FC Torpedo Taganrog | 32 | 23 | 5 | 4 | 55 | 10 | +45 | 51 | Promoted |
| 2 | FC APK Azov | 32 | 21 | 8 | 3 | 63 | 22 | +41 | 50 | Promoted |
| 3 | FC Spartak Anapa | 32 | 22 | 5 | 5 | 66 | 25 | +41 | 49 | |
| 4 | FC Zvezda Gorodishche | 32 | 18 | 4 | 10 | 50 | 30 | +20 | 40 | |
| 5 | FC Lokomotiv Mineralnyye Vody | 32 | 18 | 3 | 11 | 45 | 38 | +7 | 39 | |
| 6 | FC Uralan Elista | 32 | 14 | 9 | 9 | 43 | 29 | +14 | 37 | |
| 7 | FC Atommash Volgodonsk | 32 | 14 | 4 | 14 | 42 | 42 | 0 | 32 | |
| 8 | FC Khimik Belorechensk | 32 | 12 | 7 | 13 | 40 | 44 | −4 | 31 | |
| 9 | FC Avtodor Vladikavkaz | 32 | 11 | 8 | 13 | 35 | 38 | −3 | 30 | [+] |
| 10 | FC Start Yeisk | 32 | 11 | 4 | 17 | 34 | 40 | −6 | 26 | [+] |
| 11 | FC Dinamo Makhachkala | 32 | 10 | 6 | 16 | 36 | 47 | −11 | 26 | |
| 12 | FC Signal Izobilny | 32 | 9 | 7 | 16 | 32 | 43 | −11 | 25 | |
| 13 | FC Torpedo Armavir | 32 | 7 | 10 | 15 | 25 | 46 | −21 | 24 | [+] |
| 14 | FC Shakhtyor Shakhty | 32 | 10 | 3 | 19 | 29 | 43 | −14 | 23 | |
| 15 | FC Remontnik Prokhladny | 32 | 10 | 2 | 20 | 40 | 64 | −24 | 22 | [+] |
| 16 | FC Niva Slavyansk-na-Kubani | 32 | 6 | 8 | 18 | 23 | 56 | −33 | 20 | [+] |
| 17 | FC Metallurg Stary Oskol | 32 | 6 | 7 | 19 | 24 | 65 | −41 | 19 | [+] |

=== V Zone (Center) ===
| Pos | Team | Pld | W | D | L | GF | GA | GD | Pts | Promotion |
|---|---|---|---|---|---|---|---|---|---|---|
| 1 | FC Asmaral Moscow | 32 | 24 | 4 | 4 | 63 | 17 | +46 | 52 | Promoted |
| 2 | FC Tighina | 32 | 22 | 5 | 5 | 53 | 22 | +31 | 49 | Promoted [MDA] |
| 3 | FC Znamya Arzamas | 32 | 17 | 10 | 5 | 37 | 19 | +18 | 44 | [+] |
| 4 | FC Salyut Belgorod | 32 | 14 | 7 | 11 | 45 | 43 | +2 | 35 | |
| 5 | FC Spartak Tambov | 32 | 12 | 9 | 11 | 35 | 34 | +1 | 33 | |
| 6 | FC Saturn Ramenskoye | 32 | 11 | 11 | 10 | 34 | 31 | +3 | 33 | |
| 7 | FC Gomselmash Gomel | 32 | 14 | 4 | 14 | 48 | 48 | 0 | 32 | [BLR] |
| 8 | FC Buran Voronezh | 32 | 13 | 5 | 14 | 40 | 28 | +12 | 31 | [+] |
| 9 | FC Torgmash Lyubertsy | 32 | 10 | 10 | 12 | 36 | 42 | −6 | 30 | [+] |
| 10 | FC Khimik Dzerzhinsk | 32 | 13 | 3 | 16 | 42 | 43 | −1 | 29 | |
| 11 | FC Spartak Oryol | 32 | 11 | 7 | 14 | 28 | 35 | −7 | 29 | |
| 12 | FC Kuban Barannikovskiy | 32 | 10 | 9 | 13 | 41 | 46 | −5 | 29 | [+] |
| 13 | FC Avangard Kursk | 32 | 11 | 6 | 15 | 30 | 49 | −19 | 28 | |
| 14 | FC Oka Kolomna | 32 | 10 | 5 | 17 | 31 | 47 | −16 | 25 | |
| 15 | FC Arsenal Tula | 32 | 8 | 8 | 16 | 31 | 48 | −17 | 24 | |
| 16 | FC Khimik Semiluki | 32 | 7 | 7 | 18 | 25 | 46 | −21 | 21 | |
| 17 | FC Znamya Truda Orekhovo-Zuyevo | 32 | 6 | 8 | 18 | 21 | 42 | −21 | 20 | |

=== VI Zone (North Russia and Moscow) ===
| Pos | Team | Pld | W | D | L | GF | GA | GD | Pts | Promotion |
|---|---|---|---|---|---|---|---|---|---|---|
| 1 | FC Volga Tver | 32 | 18 | 11 | 3 | 53 | 28 | +25 | 47 | Promoted |
| 2 | FC KIM Vitebsk | 32 | 20 | 6 | 6 | 59 | 31 | +28 | 46 | Promoted [BLR] |
| 3 | FC Textilshchik Ivanovo | 32 | 18 | 7 | 7 | 60 | 24 | +36 | 43 | |
| 4 | FC RAF Jelgava | 32 | 17 | 9 | 6 | 54 | 25 | +29 | 43 | [LVA] |
| 5 | FC Khimik Cherepovets | 32 | 16 | 10 | 6 | 40 | 19 | +21 | 42 | |
| 6 | FC Mashinostroitel Pskov | 32 | 14 | 12 | 6 | 45 | 34 | +11 | 40 | [+] |
| 7 | FC Olimpia Liepaja | 32 | 14 | 9 | 9 | 36 | 37 | −1 | 37 | [LVA] |
| 8 | FC Dinamo-2 Moskva | 32 | 13 | 11 | 8 | 39 | 26 | +13 | 37 | |
| 9 | FC Kirovets Leningrad | 32 | 12 | 13 | 7 | 41 | 30 | +11 | 37 | |
| 10 | FC Spartak Kostroma | 32 | 11 | 7 | 14 | 35 | 36 | −1 | 29 | |
| 11 | FC Prometheus-Dinamo Leningrad | 32 | 8 | 12 | 12 | 32 | 38 | −6 | 28 | |
| 12 | FC Volzhanin Kineshma | 32 | 7 | 14 | 11 | 25 | 41 | −16 | 28 | |
| 13 | FC Granite Penza | 32 | 9 | 7 | 16 | 28 | 52 | −24 | 25 | [+] |
| 14 | FC Dinamo Vologda | 32 | 7 | 5 | 20 | 27 | 54 | −27 | 19 | |
| 15 | FC CSKA-2 Moskva | 32 | 5 | 6 | 21 | 14 | 40 | −26 | 16 | |
| 16 | FC Zvezda Moskva | 32 | 5 | 5 | 22 | 20 | 53 | −33 | 15 | |
| 17 | FC Spartak Petrozavodsk | 32 | 4 | 4 | 24 | 18 | 58 | −40 | 12 | [+] |

=== VII Zone (Volga/Ural) ===
| Pos | Team | Pld | W | D | L | GF | GA | GD | Pts | Promotion |
|---|---|---|---|---|---|---|---|---|---|---|
| 1 | FC KamAZ Naberezhnyye Chelny | 32 | 21 | 5 | 6 | 67 | 26 | +41 | 47 | Promoted |
| 2 | FC Lada Togliatti | 32 | 20 | 6 | 6 | 63 | 20 | +43 | 46 | Promoted |
| 3 | FC Rubin Kazan | 32 | 18 | 10 | 4 | 48 | 15 | +33 | 46 | |
| 4 | FC Druzhba Yoshkar-Ola | 32 | 21 | 2 | 9 | 66 | 30 | +36 | 44 | |
| 5 | FC Torpedo Miass | 32 | 20 | 4 | 8 | 48 | 23 | +25 | 44 | |
| 6 | FC Zenit Chelyabinsk | 32 | 16 | 7 | 9 | 48 | 30 | +18 | 39 | |
| 7 | FC Dinamo Kirov | 32 | 15 | 7 | 10 | 50 | 26 | +24 | 37 | |
| 8 | FC Stal Cheboksary | 32 | 13 | 9 | 10 | 32 | 20 | +12 | 35 | |
| 9 | FC Uralets Nizhniy Tagil | 32 | 13 | 8 | 11 | 38 | 37 | +1 | 34 | |
| 10 | FC Metallurg Magnitogorsk | 32 | 10 | 11 | 11 | 44 | 44 | 0 | 31 | |
| 11 | FC Zauralye Kurgan | 32 | 11 | 8 | 13 | 32 | 32 | 0 | 30 | |
| 12 | FC Svetotekhnika Saransk | 32 | 10 | 7 | 15 | 33 | 55 | −22 | 27 | |
| 13 | FC Avtopribor Oktyabrskiy | 32 | 7 | 13 | 12 | 22 | 34 | −12 | 27 | [+] |
| 14 | FC Bashselmash Neftekamsk | 32 | 9 | 8 | 15 | 30 | 38 | −8 | 26 | [+] |
| 15 | FC Gazovik Orenburg | 32 | 4 | 5 | 23 | 16 | 71 | −55 | 13 | |
| 16 | FC Kauchuk Sterlitamak | 32 | 5 | 2 | 25 | 31 | 83 | −52 | 12 | [+] |
| 17 | FC Zarya Podgorny | 32 | 1 | 4 | 27 | 14 | 98 | −84 | 6 | [+] |

=== VIII Zone (Kazakhstan) ===
| Pos | Team | Pld | W | D | L | GF | GA | GD | Pts | Promotion |
|---|---|---|---|---|---|---|---|---|---|---|
| 1 | FC Vostok Ust-Kamenogorsk | 36 | 28 | 2 | 6 | 75 | 29 | +46 | 58 | Promoted |
| 2 | FC Zhetysu Taldy-Kurgan | 36 | 25 | 5 | 6 | 73 | 26 | +47 | 55 | Promoted |
| 3 | FC Spartak Semipalatinsk | 36 | 22 | 9 | 5 | 65 | 24 | +41 | 53 | |
| 4 | FC Aktyubinets Aktyubinsk | 36 | 23 | 5 | 8 | 70 | 19 | +51 | 51 | |
| 5 | FC Kustanayets Kustanay | 36 | 21 | 5 | 10 | 44 | 23 | +21 | 47 | |
| 6 | FC Jezkazganets Jezkazgan | 36 | 20 | 5 | 11 | 49 | 39 | +10 | 45 | |
| 7 | FC Montazhnik Turkestan | 36 | 17 | 4 | 15 | 52 | 56 | −4 | 38 | [+] |
| 8 | FC Gornyak Khromtau | 36 | 16 | 6 | 14 | 44 | 37 | +7 | 38 | [+] |
| 9 | FC Metallurg Yermak | 36 | 16 | 5 | 15 | 58 | 46 | +12 | 37 | [+] |
| 10 | FC Sokhibkor Khalkabad | 36 | 14 | 8 | 14 | 37 | 34 | +3 | 36 | [UZB] |
| 11 | FC Spartak Kokchetav | 36 | 15 | 5 | 16 | 43 | 43 | 0 | 35 | [+] |
| 12 | FC Metallist Petropavlovsk | 36 | 17 | 0 | 19 | 42 | 46 | −4 | 34 | |
| 13 | FC Ak-Kanat Uzun-Agach | 36 | 13 | 6 | 17 | 30 | 40 | −10 | 32 | [+] |
| 14 | FC Aktau Shevchenko | 36 | 12 | 6 | 18 | 32 | 49 | −17 | 30 | [+] |
| 15 | FC Bulat Temirtau | 36 | 11 | 6 | 19 | 36 | 55 | −19 | 28 | [+] |
| 16 | FC Khimik Almalyk | 36 | 9 | 7 | 20 | 34 | 54 | −20 | 25 | [+] [UZB] |
| 17 | FC Dostuk Sokuluk | 36 | 6 | 9 | 21 | 27 | 53 | −26 | 21 | [+] [KGZ] |
| 18 | FC Uralets Uralsk | 36 | 7 | 4 | 25 | 25 | 67 | −42 | 18 | |
| 19 | FC Metallurg Balkhash | 36 | 0 | 3 | 33 | 21 | 117 | −96 | 3 | [+] |

=== IX Zone (Central Asia) ===
| Pos | Team | Pld | W | D | L | GF | GA | GD | Pts | Promotion |
|---|---|---|---|---|---|---|---|---|---|---|
| 1 | FC Nuravshon Bukhara | 38 | 28 | 7 | 3 | 116 | 25 | +91 | 63 | Promoted [+] [UZB] |
| 2 | FC Kasansayets Kasansay | 38 | 24 | 5 | 9 | 83 | 34 | +49 | 53 | Promoted [UZB] |
| 3 | FC Yangiyer | 38 | 20 | 5 | 13 | 67 | 56 | +11 | 45 | [UZB] |
| 4 | FC Dinamo Samarkand | 38 | 19 | 7 | 12 | 67 | 39 | +28 | 45 | [UZB] |
| 5 | FC Chirchik | 38 | 17 | 11 | 10 | 50 | 37 | +13 | 45 | [UZB] |
| 6 | FC Khojent Leninabad | 38 | 19 | 6 | 13 | 58 | 53 | +5 | 44 | [TJK] |
| 7 | FC Traktor Tashkent | 38 | 20 | 2 | 16 | 61 | 45 | +16 | 42 | [UZB] |
| 8 | FC Alay Osh | 38 | 17 | 6 | 15 | 56 | 46 | +10 | 40 | [KGZ] |
| 9 | FC Yeshlik Turakurgan | 38 | 17 | 6 | 15 | 64 | 56 | +8 | 40 | [+] [UZB] |
| 10 | FC Ahal Akdashayak | 38 | 18 | 3 | 17 | 45 | 48 | −3 | 39 | [TKM] |
| 11 | FC Merv Mary | 38 | 18 | 3 | 17 | 52 | 58 | −6 | 39 | [+] [TKM] |
| 12 | FC Regar Tursun-Zade | 38 | 15 | 7 | 16 | 65 | 58 | +7 | 37 | [+] [TJK] |
| 13 | FC Sverdlovets Tashkent Region | 38 | 14 | 9 | 15 | 61 | 62 | −1 | 37 | [UZB] |
| 14 | FC Tselinnik Turtkul | 38 | 15 | 5 | 18 | 53 | 77 | −24 | 35 | [UZB] |
| 15 | FC Shakhtyor Angren | 38 | 12 | 7 | 19 | 43 | 55 | −12 | 31 | [+] [UZB] |
| 16 | FC Aralvodstroyevets Nukus | 38 | 12 | 6 | 20 | 40 | 66 | −26 | 30 | [+] [UZB] |
| 17 | FC Jeyhun Urgench | 38 | 12 | 6 | 20 | 34 | 65 | −31 | 30 | [UZB] |
| 18 | FC Nebitchi Nebit-Dag | 38 | 11 | 4 | 23 | 49 | 82 | −33 | 26 | [+] [TKM] |
| 19 | FC Geolog Karshi | 38 | 8 | 8 | 22 | 34 | 70 | −36 | 24 | [+] [UZB] |
| 20 | FC Sherdor Samarkand | 38 | 7 | 1 | 30 | 34 | 100 | −66 | 15 | [+] [UZB] |

=== X Zone (Russia Far East) ===
| Pos | Team | Pld | W | D | L | GF | GA | GD | Pts | Promotion |
|---|---|---|---|---|---|---|---|---|---|---|
| 1 | FC Sakhalin Yuzhno-Sakhalinsk | 28 | 16 | 9 | 3 | 34 | 13 | +21 | 41 | Promoted |
| 2 | FC Lokomotiv Chita | 28 | 18 | 4 | 6 | 61 | 27 | +34 | 40 | |
| 3 | FC Vulkan Petropavlovsk-Kamchatskiy | 28 | 16 | 6 | 6 | 38 | 18 | +20 | 38 | |
| 4 | FC SKA Khabarovsk | 28 | 13 | 8 | 7 | 44 | 24 | +20 | 34 | |
| 5 | FC Luch Vladivostok | 28 | 10 | 14 | 4 | 31 | 21 | +10 | 34 | |
| 6 | FC Tom Tomsk | 28 | 14 | 5 | 9 | 29 | 17 | +12 | 33 | |
| 7 | FC Amur Komsomolsk-na-Amure | 28 | 13 | 4 | 11 | 33 | 32 | +1 | 30 | |
| 8 | FC Metallurg Novokuznetsk | 28 | 11 | 8 | 9 | 27 | 26 | +1 | 30 | |
| 9 | FC Avtomobilist Krasnoyarsk | 28 | 11 | 7 | 10 | 28 | 26 | +2 | 29 | |
| 10 | FC Angara Angarsk | 28 | 9 | 7 | 12 | 29 | 38 | −9 | 25 | [+] |
| 11 | FC Chkalovets Novosibirsk | 28 | 8 | 6 | 14 | 25 | 37 | −12 | 22 | |
| 12 | FC Torpedo Rubtsovsk | 28 | 9 | 3 | 16 | 31 | 43 | −12 | 21 | |
| 13 | FC Selenga Ulan-Ude | 28 | 6 | 8 | 14 | 26 | 44 | −18 | 20 | |
| 14 | FC Progress Biysk | 28 | 4 | 10 | 14 | 22 | 38 | −16 | 18 | |
| 15 | FC Shakhtyor Leninsk-Kuznetskiy | 28 | 2 | 1 | 25 | 12 | 66 | −54 | 5 | [+] |

== See also ==
- Soviet Second League B
