= Vyacheslav Zvyagin =

Russian footballer and coach

Personal information
- Full name: Vyacheslav Yevgenyevich Zvyagin
- Date of birth: 19 February 1971 (age 55)
- Place of birth: Saratov, Russian SFSR
- Height: 1.80 m (5 ft 11 in)
- Position: Goalkeeper

Team information
- Current team: FC Sokol Saratov (GK coach)

Youth career
- 1980–1988: SDYuShOR Profkoma SEPO Saratov

Senior career*
Years	Team	Apps	(Gls)
1989	FC Sokol Saratov	0	(0)
1989	FC ShVSM-SKA Kuybyshev	4	(0)
1990	FC Zarya Podgorny	17	(0)
1990	FC SKA Kuybyshev		
1990–1991	FC SKA Yekaterinburg (amateur)		
1991–2005	FC Sokol Saratov	74	(0)
1994	→ FC Sokol-d Saratov (loan)	5	(0)
2006	FC Sokol Saratov (amateur)		
2007–2008	FC Sokol Saratov	5	(0)

Managerial career
- 2015: FC Sokol Saratov (academy)
- 2015–: FC Sokol Saratov (GK coach)
- * Club domestic league appearances and goals

Vyacheslav Yevgenyevich Zvyagin (Russian: Вячеслав Евгеньевич Звягин; born 19 February 1971) is a Russian football coach and a former player. He works as a goalkeepers' coach of FC Sokol Saratov.
