= Igor Povalyayev =

Russian footballer

Personal information
- Full name: Igor Stanislavovich Povalyayev
- Date of birth: 16 November 1962 (age 63)
- Place of birth: Tashkent, Uzbek SSR, Soviet Union
- Height: 1.70 m (5 ft 7 in)
- Positions: Defender; midfielder

Youth career
- RUOR im. Titova Tashkent

Senior career*
Years	Team	Apps	(Gls)
1979–1981	FC Pakhtakor Tashkent	15	(0)
1982–1985	FC Zvezda Dzhizak	96	(9)
1985	FC Sokhibkor Khalkabad	27	(8)
1986–1988	FC Rostselmash Rostov-on-Don	89	(2)
1988–1989	FC Spartak Moscow	15	(0)
1989–1990	FC Rostselmash Rostov-on-Don	68	(0)
1991–1992	FC Lokomotiv Moscow	12	(0)
1992	→ FC Lokomotiv-d Moscow	9	(1)
1992	FC Dynamo Stavropol	14	(0)
1993	FC Istochnik Rostov-on-Don	17	(5)
1993–1994	Birkirkara F.C.	4	(0)
1994	FC Tekhinvest-M Moskovsky	30	(2)
1995	FC SKA Rostov-on-Don	11	(0)
1995	FC Kolos Pavlovskaya		
1996	FC Shakhtyor Shakhty	2	(0)
1997	FC Avangard Rostov-on-Don		
- * Club domestic league appearances and goals

Igor Stanislavovich Povalyayev (Russian: Игорь Станиславович Поваляев; born 16 November 1962) is a former Russian-Uzbekistani professional footballer.

== Club career ==
He made his professional debut in the Soviet Top League in 1979 for FC Pakhtakor Tashkent. He played 3 games in the European Cup 1988–89 for FC Spartak Moscow.

== See also ==
- Football in Russia
- List of football clubs in Russia
