= Isa Markhiyev =

Russian footballer and coach

Personal information
- Full name: Isa Magometovich Markhiyev
- Date of birth: 9 May 1971 (age 55)
- Height: 1.85 m (6 ft 1 in)
- Positions: Forward; midfielder

Team information
- Current team: FC Angusht Nazran (assistant manager)

Senior career*
Years	Team	Apps	(Gls)
1992	FC Urartu Grozny	30	(10)
1993	FC Erzu Grozny	10	(0)
1993	FC Urartu Grozny	9	(5)
1994–2002	FC Angusht Nazran	299	(166)
2003	FC Zhemchuzhina Sochi	20	(4)
2004–2006	FC Angusht Nazran	51	(14)

Managerial career
- 2006: FC Angusht Nazran
- 2009–2013: FC Angusht Nazran (director of sports)
- 2017–2019: FC Angusht Nazran (assistant)
- 2019–2024: FC Angusht Nazran
- 2024–: FC Angusht Nazran (assistant)
- * Club domestic league appearances and goals

Isa Magometovich Markhiyev (Russian: Иса Магометович Мархиев; born 9 May 1971) is a Russian professional football coach and a former player who is an assistant manager of FC Angusht Nazran.

== Club career ==
He made his Russian Football National League debut for FC Erzu Grozny on 3 April 1993 in a game against FC Druzhba Maykop. He played one more season in the FNL for FC Angusht Nazran.

== Honours ==
- Russian Third League Zone 1 top scorer: 1995 (21 goals).
- Russian Second Division Zone South top scorer: 1999 (34 goals).
