= Valeri Zubakov =

Russian footballer and coach

Personal information
- Full name: Valeri Nikolayevich Zubakov
- Date of birth: 30 January 1946 (age 80)
- Position: Defender

Senior career*
Years	Team	Apps	(Gls)
1971	FC Torpedo Taganrog		
1972–1973	FC Uralan Elista		
1976	FC Uralan Elista	31	(0)

Managerial career
- 1981–1982: FC Uralan Elista (assistant)
- 1984: FC Uralan Elista (assistant)
- 1985: FC Uralan Elista
- 1990: FC Rostselmash Rostov-on-Don (assistant)
- 1991–1992: FC Mashuk Pyatigorsk
- 1993: FC Baysachnr Elista
- 1994–1996: FC Volgodonsk
- 1998: FC Uralan Elista (assistant)
- 1999: FC Uralan Elista (director)
- 2000–2006: FC Krylia Sovetov Samara (director)
- 2010–2013: FC Khimki (director)
- 2013–2018: FC Khimki (scout)
- * Club domestic league appearances and goals

Valeri Nikolayevich Zubakov (Russian: Валерий Николаевич Зубаков; born 30 January 1946) is a Russian professional football coach and a former player.
