= Ilya Ilyin (footballer) =

Russian footballer

Personal information
- Full name: Ilya Mikhailovich Ilyin
- Date of birth: 10 August 1982 (age 44)
- Place of birth: Moscow, Russian SFSR
- Height: 1.91 m (6 ft 3 in)
- Position: Goalkeeper

Youth career
- FShM-Torpedo Moscow

Senior career*
| Years | Team | Apps | (Gls) |
| 2000–2001 | FC Torpedo Moscow | 0 | (0) |
| 2002 | FC Rybinsk | 32 | (0) |
| 2003–2004 | FC Rotor Volgograd | 0 | (0) |
| 2005 | FC Rubin-2 Kazan | 15 | (0) |
| 2006 | FC Presnya Moscow | 6 | (0) |
| 2006–2007 | FC Metallurg Krasnoyarsk | 28 | (0) |
| 2008 | FC Avangard Kursk | 29 | (0) |
| 2009 | FC Volgar-Gazprom-2 Astrakhan | 20 | (0) |
| 2010 | FC Avangard Kursk | 20 | (0) |
| 2011–2012 | FC Yenisey Krasnoyarsk | 14 | (0) |
| 2012 | FC Tyumen | 0 | (0) |
| 2016 | FC Istra (amateur) | | |
- * Club domestic league appearances and goals

Ilya Mikhailovich Ilyin (Russian: Илья Михайлович Ильин; born 10 August 1982) is a former Russian professional football player.

== Club career ==
He made his professional debut for FC Rotor Volgograd on 5 November 2003 in the Russian Cup game against FC Anzhi Makhachkala.

He played 4 seasons in the Russian Football National League for FC Yenisey Krasnoyarsk, FC Volgar Astrakhan and FC Avangard Kursk.
