= Yuri Syomin (footballer) =

Russian footballer

Personal information
- Full name: Yuri Viktorovich Syomin
- Date of birth: 7 February 1968 (age 58)
- Height: 1.82 m (5 ft 11 1/2 in)
- Position: Midfielder

Youth career
- Voskhod Kuybyshev

Senior career*
Years	Team	Apps	(Gls)
1985	FC Torpedo Togliatti	2	(0)
1987	FC Druzhba Yoshkar-Ola	6	(0)
1989–1990	FC Start Ulyanovsk	58	(4)
1990–1993	FC Krylia Sovetov Samara	40	(0)
1993–1995	FC SKD Samara	100	(10)
1996–1997	FC Svetotekhnika Saransk	71	(7)
- * Club domestic league appearances and goals

Yuri Viktorovich Syomin (Russian: Юрий Викторович Сёмин; born 7 February 1968) is a former Russian football player.
