= Dmitri Yemelyanov =

Russian footballer

Personal information
- Full name: Dmitri Vladimirovich Yemelyanov
- Date of birth: 9 February 1972 (age 54)
- Place of birth: Kuybyshev, Russian SFSR
- Height: 1.80 m (5 ft 11 in)
- Positions: Midfielder; forward

Senior career*
Years	Team	Apps	(Gls)
1989–1990	FC Krylia Sovetov Samara	14	(0)
1990–1993	FC Zarya Krotovka	116	(39)
1994–1995	FC SKD Samara	58	(28)
1995	FC Lada Dimitrovgrad	12	(2)
1996–2001	FC Lada Togliatti	165	(23)
2001–2002	FC KAMAZ Naberezhnye Chelny	16	(2)
2002	FC Svetotekhnika Saransk	10	(2)
2003	FC Luch-Energiya Vladivostok	12	(2)
2004	FC Nosta Novotroitsk	31	(1)
2005	FC Lada Togliatti	23	(4)
2006–2007	FC Nosta Novotroitsk	31	(1)

Managerial career
- 2009: FC Nosta Novotroitsk (assistant)
- 2010: FC Tyumen (assistant)
- 2011–2012: FC Yakutiya Yakutsk (assistant)
- 2013: FC Amkar Perm (assistant)
- 2015: FC Nosta Novotroitsk
- 2015: FC Nosta Novotroitsk (assistant)
- 2016: FC Syzran-2003 (conditioning)
- 2016–2017: FC Sakhalin Yuzhno-Sakhalinsk (assistant)
- 2017: FC Sakhalin Yuzhno-Sakhalinsk
- 2019–2020: FC Akron Tolyatti
- 2022: FC Akron Tolyatti (assistant)
- 2022: FC Torpedo Miass
- * Club domestic league appearances and goals

Dmitri Vladimirovich Yemelyanov (Russian: Дмитрий Владимирович Емельянов; born 9 February 1972) is a Russian professional football coach and a former player.

== Honours ==
- Russian Third League Zone 5 top scorer: 1994 (18 goals).
