= Igor Palachyov =

Russian footballer

Personal information
- Full name: Igor Vitalyevich Palachyov
- Date of birth: 9 October 1973 (age 53)
- Place of birth: Bryansk, Russian SFSR
- Height: 1.94 m (6 ft 4 1/2 in)
- Position: Forward

Youth career
- Desna Bryansk

Senior career*
Years	Team	Apps	(Gls)
1990	FC Zarya Podgorny	1	(0)
1991	FC Krylia Sovetov Samara	9	(1)
1992–1993	FC Zarya Krotovka	64	(29)
1994–1995	FC SKD Samara	69	(17)
1996–1997	FC Nosta Novotroitsk	75	(22)
1998	FC Gazovik Orenburg	3	(1)
1998–1999	FC Lada Togliatti	16	(4)
1999	FC Lada Dimitrovgrad	17	(1)
2000	FC Uralmash Yekaterinburg	27	(36)
2001	FC Chernomorets Novorossiysk	1	(0)
2001	FC Uralmash Yekaterinburg	24	(21)
2002	FC KAMAZ Naberezhnye Chelny	8	(2)
2003	FC Dynamo Saint Petersburg	11	(1)
2004	FC Lukoil Chelyabinsk	7	(2)
2005	FC Lada Dimitrovgrad	6	(1)
- * Club domestic league appearances and goals

Igor Vitalyevich Palachyov (Russian: Игорь Витальевич Палачёв; born 9 October 1973) is a former Russian professional footballer.

== Club career ==
In 2003, he moved from FC KAMAZ to FC Dynamo Saint Petersburg.

== Honours ==
- Russian Second Division Zone Ural top scorer: 2000 (36 goals).
