= Vladimir Benedsky =

Russian footballer

Personal information
- Full name: Vladimir Vladimirovich Benedsky
- Date of birth: 19 June 1970 (age 56)
- Place of birth: Grozny, Russian SFSR
- Height: 1.85 m (6 ft 1 in)
- Positions: Defender; midfielder

Senior career*
Years	Team	Apps	(Gls)
1988	FC Terek Grozny	5	(0)
1990	FC APK Azov	30	(3)
1991	FC Dynamo Stavropol	0	(0)
1991	FC APK Azov	26	(0)
1992	FC Beshtau Lermontov	36	(2)
1993	FC Dynamo Stavropol	0	(0)
1993	FC Druzhba Budyonnovsk	36	(15)
1994	FC Dynamo Stavropol	17	(1)
1995–1997	FC Avtozapchast Baksan	86	(12)
1998–1999	FC Amkar Perm	30	(1)
2000	FC KAMAZ-Chally Naberezhnye Chelny	25	(7)
- * Club domestic league appearances and goals

Vladimir Vladimirovich Benedsky (Russian: Владимир Владимирович Бенедский; born 19 June 1970 in Grozny) is a former Russian football player.
