= FC Zhemchuzhina =

FC Zhemchuzhina may refer to the following association football clubs:

- FC Zhemchuzhina Budyonnovsk
- FC Zhemchuzhina-Sochi
- FC Zhemchuzhina Yalta
