= Sergei Chekmezov =

Russian footballer and coach (born 1964)

Personal information
- Full name: Sergei Viktorovich Chekmezov
- Date of birth: 10 October 1964 (age 62)
- Place of birth: Alma-Ata, Kazakh SSR, Soviet Union
- Height: 1.87 m (6 ft 1 1/2 in)
- Position: Goalkeeper

Team information
- Current team: FC Kaisar (GK coach)

Senior career*
Years	Team	Apps	(Gls)
1981–1982	SKIF Alma-Ata	6	(0)
1984	FC Zhetysu	0	(0)
1984–1986	SKIF Alma-Ata	74	(0)
1987	FC Shakhter Karagandy	23	(0)
1988–1989	FC Kairat	29	(0)
1990	FC Torpedo Moscow	0	(0)
1991–1993	FC Zhemchuzhina Sochi	100	(0)
1994	FC Krylia Sovetov Samara	17	(0)
1995	FC Chernomorets Novorossiysk	0	(0)
1996–1997	FC Energiya Chaykovsky	41	(0)
1998	FC Kuban Krasnodar	4	(0)
1999	FC Chkalovets Novosibirsk	7	(0)
2000	FC KAMAZ-Chally Naberezhnye Chelny	2	(0)
2001	FC Zhemchuzhina Sochi	4	(0)
2007–2008	FC Vostok	0	(0)

Managerial career
- 2003: FC Ural Yekaterinburg (assistant)
- 2004–2006: FC Taraz (GK coach)
- 2007: FC Alma-Ata (GK coach)
- 2009: FC Vostok (GK coach)
- 2010: FC Kairat (GK coach)
- 2011–2014: FC Atyrau (GK coach)
- 2015: FC Zhetysu (GK coach)
- 2016: FC Aktobe (GK coach)
- 2017: FC Altai Semey (GK coach)
- 2018–: FC Kaisar (GK coach)
- * Club domestic league appearances and goals

Sergei Viktorovich Chekmezov (Russian: Серге́й Викторович Чекмезов; born 10 October 1964) is a Russian professional football coach and a former player. He is the goalkeepers coach with FC Kaisar. He also holds Kazakhstani citizenship.

== Club career ==
He made his professional debut in the Soviet Second League in 1982 for SKIF Alma-Ata.

== Honours ==
- USSR Federation Cup winner: 1988.

== See also ==
- Football in Russia
- List of football clubs in Russia
