= Sergey Ageyev =

Russian footballer and football official

Personal information
- Full name: Sergey Yuryevich Ageyev
- Date of birth: 12 November 1968 (age 57)
- Height: 1.91 m (6 ft 3 in)
- Position: Defender

Team information
- Current team: FC Tom Tomsk (administrator)

Senior career*
Years	Team	Apps	(Gls)
1991	Dynamo Barnaul	11	(1)
1992–1994	Politekhnik-92 Barnaul	61	(21)
1995–1996	Viktoriya Nazarovo	57	(32)
1997–2001	Tom Tomsk	171	(31)
2002	Kuzbass-Dynamo Kemerovo	30	(7)
2003	Polimer Barnaul		

Managerial career
- 2005–2008: FC Tom Tomsk (reserves administrator)
- 2015–: FC Tom Tomsk (administrator)
- * Club domestic league appearances and goals

Sergey Yuryevich Ageyev (Russian: Сергей Юрьевич Агеев; born 12 November 1968) is a Russian professional football official and a former player. He currently works as an administrator for FC Tom Tomsk.

== Club career ==
He made his Russian Football National League debut for FC Tom Tomsk on 29 March 1998 in a game against FC Anzhi Makhachkala. He played 4 seasons in the FNL for Tom.
