= Mikhail Trukhlov =

Russian footballer

Personal information
- Full name: Mikhail Valentinovich Trukhlov
- Date of birth: 13 October 1969 (age 57)
- Place of birth: Rybinsk, Russian SFSR
- Height: 1.76 m (5 ft 9 1/2 in)
- Position: Forward

Youth career
- FC Poligrafist Rybinsk

Senior career*
Years	Team	Apps	(Gls)
1988	FC Poligrafist Andropov		
1989	FC Prizma Rybinsk		
1990–1991	FC Vympel Rybinsk (amateur)		
1992–1994	FC Vympel Rybinsk	95	(36)
1995–1996	FC Tekstilshchik Kamyshin	33	(2)
1997–1998	FC Arsenal Tula	52	(5)
1999	FC Dynamo Stavropol	12	(0)
1999–2000	FC SKA-Zvezda Rybinsk		
2001	FC Rybinsk	15	(1)
2003	FC Don Novomoskovsk	7	(0)
2003–2004	FC Rybinsk (amateur)		
- * Club domestic league appearances and goals

Mikhail Valentinovich Trukhlov (Russian: Михаил Валентинович Трухлов; born 13 October 1969 in Rybinsk) is a former Russian football player.
