= Yevgeni Shipovskiy =

Russian footballer

Personal information
- Full name: Yevgeni Leonidovich Shipovskiy
- Date of birth: 13 March 1962 (age 64)
- Height: 1.82 m (6 ft 0 in)
- Position: Forward

Senior career*
Years	Team	Apps	(Gls)
1988	FC Torpedo Rubtsovsk	26	(0)
1989–1990	FC Dynamo Barnaul	44	(3)
1991	FC Metallurg Novokuznetsk	21	(7)
1992	FC Dynamo Barnaul	11	(0)
1993–1995	FC Torpedo Rubtsovsk	77	(33)
1996	FC Samotlor-XXI Nizhnevartovsk	27	(2)
- * Club domestic league appearances and goals

Yevgeni Leonidovich Shipovskiy (Russian: Евгений Леонидович Шиповский; born on 13 March 1962) is a former Russian professional football player.

== Club career ==
He made his Russian Football National League debut for FC Dynamo Barnaul on 6 May 1992 in a game against FC Sakhalin Yuzhno-Sakhalinsk.

== Honours ==
- Russian Second Division Zone 7 top scorer: 1993 (20 goals).
