= Roman Sidorov =

Soviet-born Russian footballer

Personal information
- Full name: Roman Olegovich Sidorov
- Date of birth: 28 March 1955
- Place of birth: Stavropol, Stavropol Krai, RSFSR
- Date of death: 10 February 2015 (aged 59)
- Place of death: Pyatigorsk, Stavropol Krai, Russia
- Height: 1.83 m (6 ft 0 in)
- Position: Forward

Senior career*
| Years | Team | Apps | (Gls) |
| 1976 | SC Odesa | 21 | (3) |
| 1976–1978 | FC Mashuk-KMV Pyatigorsk | 24 | (19) |
| 1979 | FC Krylia Sovetov Samara | 31 | (6) |
| 1980 | Neftchi PFK | 0 | (0) |
| 1980 | FC Mashuk-KMV Pyatigorsk | 32 | (8) |
| 1981 | FC Dynamo Stavropol | 41 | (6) |
| 1982–1984 | FC Nart Cherkessk | 83 | (39) |
| 1985 | FC Mashuk-KMV Pyatigorsk | 28 | (7) |
| 1986–1989 | FC Nart Cherkessk | 99 | (30) |
| 1989 | FC Mashuk-KMV Pyatigorsk | 10 | (0) |
| 1992–1994 | FC Beshtau Lermontov | 70 | (27) |
- * Club domestic league appearances and goals

Roman Olegovich Sidorov (Russian: Роман Олегович Сидоров; 28 March 1955 – 10 February 2015) was a Soviet-born Russian association football forward.
