= Viktor Yerokhin =

Russian footballer and coach

Personal information
- Full name: Viktor Fyodorovich Yerokhin
- Date of birth: January 15, 1940
- Date of death: May 10, 2014 (aged 74)
- Height: 1.70 m (5 ft 7 in)
- Positions: Defender; midfielder

Senior career*
Years	Team	Apps	(Gls)
1958	FC Zvezda Perm		
1959	FC SKVO Sverdlovsk		
1960–1963	FC Uralmash Sverdlovsk		
1964–1965	FC Dnipro Dnipropetrovsk		
1966–1972	FC Uralmash Sverdlovsk		

Managerial career
- 1974: FC Uralmash Sverdlovsk (masseur)
- 1983–1988: FC Uralmash Sverdlovsk (assistant)
- 1993: FC Uralelektromed Verkhnyaya Pyshma
- 1995: FC Uralmash-d Yekaterinburg
- 1997: FC Uralmash Yekaterinburg
- 1999–2002: FC Uralmash Yekaterinburg (assistant)
- * Club domestic league appearances and goals

Viktor Fyodorovich Yerokhin (Russian: Виктор Фёдорович Ерохин; January 15, 1940 – May 10, 2014) was a Russian professional football coach and a former player.
