= Yuri Vereykin =

Russian footballer, coach, and referee

Personal information
- Full name: Yuri Petrovich Vereykin
- Date of birth: July 27, 1939 (age 87)
- Position: Defender

Senior career*
Years	Team	Apps	(Gls)
1964–1969	FC Shinnik Yaroslavl		
1971	FC Vulkan Petropavlovsk-Kamchatsky		

Managerial career
- 1993: FC TRASKO Moscow
- 1994: FC Rossiya Moscow (assistant)
- 1995–1998: FC Monolit Moscow
- * Club domestic league appearances and goals

Yuri Petrovich Vereykin (Russian: Юрий Петрович Верейкин; born July 27, 1939) is a Russian professional football coach and a former player.

He also worked as a referee.
