= Gennadi Matveyev =

Soviet footballer

Personal information
- Full name: Gennadi Mikhailovich Matveyev
- Date of birth: 22 August 1937
- Place of birth: Rostov-on-Don, USSR
- Date of death: 15 January 2014 (aged 76)
- Position: Striker

Senior career*
Years	Team	Apps	(Gls)
1957–1959	Rostselmash Rostov-on-Don		
1959–1968	FC SKA Rostov-on-Don		

International career
1964–1966	USSR	6	(2)

Managerial career
- 1968–1970: FC SKA Rostov-on-Don
- 1974: FC Kuban Krasnodar
- 1985: FC Spartak Tambov
- 1989: FC Spartak Tambov
- 1991: FC Spartak Tambov (assistant)
- 1993: FC Khimik Uvarovo
- * Club domestic league appearances and goals

Gennadi Mikhailovich Matveyev (Russian: Геннадий Михайлович Матвеев; 22 August 1937 in Rostov-on-Don – 15 January 2014) was a Soviet football player.

== International career ==
Matveyev made his debut for USSR on 11 October 1964 in a friendly against Austria.
