= Aleksei Gudkov =

Russian association football player

Personal information
- Full name: Aleksei Olegovich Gudkov
- Date of birth: 26 June 1972 (age 54)
- Place of birth: Smolensk, Russian SFSR
- Height: 1.72 m (5 ft 7 1/2 in)
- Position: Midfielder

Youth career
- Iskra Smolensk

Senior career*
Years	Team	Apps	(Gls)
1991	Iskra Smolensk	4	(0)
1992	SKD Smolensk		
1993–2001	Kristall Smolensk	270	(48)
2000	→ Anzhi Makhachkala (loan)	12	(2)
2002–2003	Salyut-Energia Belgorod	38	(1)
2004	Slavia Mozyr	24	(2)
2005–2006	Smolensk	43	(4)
2007	Titan Roslavl		
2009	VF MGIU Vyazma		
2011	VF MGIU Vyazma		
- * Club domestic league appearances and goals

Aleksei Olegovich Gudkov (Russian: Алексей Олегович Гудков; born 26 June 1972 in Smolensk) is a former Russian football player.
