= FC Avtomobilist Yuzhno-Sakhalinsk =

- Full name: Football Club Avtomobilist Yuzhno-Sakhalinsk
- Founded: 1984
- Dissolved: 2003
- League: Russian Second League, Zone East
- 1994: 8th

FC Avtomobilist Yuzhno-Sakhalinsk (Russian: «Автомобилист» (Южно‑Сахалинск)) was a Russian football team from Yuzhno-Sakhalinsk. It played professionally for one season - in the Russian Second League, Zone East in 1994.
