= FC Gigant Voskresensk =

- Full name: Football Club Gigant Voskresensk
- Founded: 1993
- Dissolved: 1998
- League: Amateur Football League, Zone Moscow Oblast
- 1997: 1st

FC Gigant Voskresensk (Russian: «Гигант» (Воскресенск)) was a Russian football team from Voskresensk. It played professionally in 1993 and 1994. Their best result was 8th place in Zone 4 of the Russian Second Division in 1993.

== Team name history ==
- 1993: FC Viktor-Gigant Voskresensk
- 1994–1998: FC Gigant Voskresensk
