= FC Agan Raduzhny =

- Full name: Football Club Agan Raduzhny
- Founded: 1992
- Dissolved: 1994
- League: Russian Second Division, Zone Siberia
- 1994: Excluded after 3 games

FC Agan Raduzhny (Russian: «Аган» (Радужный)) was a Russian football team from Raduzhny Raduzhny is a town in Khanty-Mansi Autonomous Okrug, Russia, located on the Agan River, 475 kilometres (295 mi) northeast of Khanty-Mansiysk and 975 kilometres (606 mi) northeast of Tyumen. Population: 47,060; 43,726. It was founded as a settlement in an oil-extracting area. It received town status in 1985. The town is served by the Raduzhny Airport. Economy of town is based on oil and natural gas extraction.

The football team was active in the Russian professional leagues from 1992 to 1994. During this time they played 48 matches, won 17, drew 13 and lost 18.

Their best season came in 1992 when they finished 6th in the Zone 6 of the Russian Second Division in 1992.
