= Yeghvard FC =

Yeghvard Football Club
- Full name: Yeghvard Football Club
- Founded: 1986; 39 years ago
- Dissolved: 1996; 29 years ago
- Ground: Yeghvard City Stadium
- Capacity: 250

Yeghvard FC (Armenian: Եղվարդ Ֆուտբոլային Ակումբ) was an Armenian football club from the town of Yeghvard, Kotayk Province.

The club was founded in 1986, However, it was dissolved in 1996 and is no longer active in professional football.

== League record ==
Year	Club Name	Division	Position	GP	W	D	L	GS	GA	PTS
1990	Zoravan FC	Armenian SSR League	10	32	13	7	12	72	57	33
1991	Zoravan FC	Armenian SSR League	13	38	12	7	19	61	70	31
1992	Zoravan FC	Armenian Premier League	18	22	10	4	8	49	39	24
1993	Yeghvard FC	Armenian First League	3	22	14	3	5	55	34	31
1994	Yeghvard FC	Armenian First League	7	18	5	0	13	34	64	10
1995	Yeghvard FC	Armenian First League	3	12	6	1	5	29	20	19
1995–96	Yeghvard FC	Armenian First League	12	22	1	1	20	17	91	4
1996–97 – present	Yeghvard FC	no participation	-	-	-	-	-	-	-	-
