= FC Monolit Moscow =

- Full name: Football Club Monolit Moscow
- Founded: 1993
- Dissolved: 2000
- League: Amateur Football League, Zone Center, Moscow
- 1999: 3rd

FC Monolit Moscow (Russian: «Монолит» (Москва)) was a Russian football team from Moscow. It played professionally from 1994 to 1998. Their best result was 21st place in the Russian Second Division zone West in 1998.

== Team name history ==
- 1993–1994 FC Rossiya Moscow
- 1995–1999 FC Monolit Moscow
