= FC KamAZavtotsentr Naberezhnye Chelny =

- Full name: Football Club KamAZavtotsentr Naberezhnye Chelny
- Founded: 1992
- Dissolved: 1995
- League: Russian Third League, Zone 6
- 1994: 11th

FC KamAZavtotsentr Naberezhnye Chelny (Russian: «КамАЗавтоцентр» (Набережные Челны)) was a Russian football team from Naberezhnye Chelny. It played professionally from 1992 to 1994. Their best result was 5th place in Zone 6 of the Russian Second Division in 1993.

== Team name history ==
- 1992: FC KATs-Skif Naberezhnye Chelny
- 1993–1994: FC KamAZavtotsentr Naberezhnye Chelny
