= FC Sputnik Kimry =

- Full name: Football Club Sputnik Kimry
- Founded: 1992
- Dissolved: 1993
- League: Russian Second Division, Zone 5
- 1993: Excluded after playing 7 games

FC Sputnik Kimry (Russian: «Спутник» (Кимры)) was a Russian football team from Kimry. It played professionally in 1991 and 1992, taking 15th place in Zone 4 of the Russian Second Division in 1992.
