= FC GAI Kiselyovsk =

- Full name: Football Club GAI Kiselyovsk
- Founded: 1966
- Dissolved: 1998
- League: Amateur Football League, Zone Siberia
- 1997: 2nd

FC GAI Kiselyovsk (Russian: ГАИ (Киселёвск)) was a Russian football team from Kiselyovsk. It played professionally from 1966 to 1970 and from 1993 to 1994. Their best result was 1st place in Zone 6 of the Soviet Second League in 1969.

== Team name history ==
- 1966–1991: FC Shakhtyor Kiselyovsk
- 1992: FC Nika Kiselyovsk
- 1993–1996: FC Shakhtyor Kiselyovsk
- 1997: FC GAI Kiselyovsk
