= FC Avangard-Kortek =

- Full name: Football Club Avangard-Kortek
- Founded: 1906
- Dissolved: 1997
- League: Russian Third League, Zone 3
- 1996: 7th

FC Avangard-Kortek (Russian: ФК «Авангард-Кортэк») was a Russian football team from Kolomna. It played professionally in 1948–1949, 1960, 1963–1969 and 1992–1996. Their best result was 9th place in Zone 1 of the second-highest Soviet First League in 1948 (it played on that level in 1948–1949 and 1960). In 1997, it merged with FC Oka to form FC Kolomna.

== Team name history ==
- 1906–? FC KGO Kolomna
- ?-1937 FC Dzerzhinets Kolomna
- 1938–1947 FC Zenit Kolomna
- 1948–1959 FC Dzerzhinets Kolomna
- 1960–1992 FC Avangard Kolomna
- 1993 FC Viktor-Avangard Kolomna
- 1994–1996 FC Avangard-Kortek Kolomna
