= FC Metiznik Magnitogorsk =

- Full name: Football Club Metiznik Magnitogorsk
- Founded: 1992
- Dissolved: 1998
- League: Russian Third League, Zone 5
- 1997: 4th

FC Metiznik Magnitogorsk (Russian: «Метизник» (Магнитогорск)) was a Russian football team from Magnitogorsk. It played professionally from 1993 to 1997. Their best result was 4th place in Zone 6 of the Russian Second Division in 1993.

== Team name history ==
- 1992: FC Metiznik-Alternativa Magnitogorsk
- 1993–1997: FC Metiznik Magnitogorsk
