= FC Gornyak Gramoteino =

- Full name: Football Club Gornyak Gramoteino
- Founded: 1992
- Dissolved: 1994
- League: Russian Second Division, Zone 7
- 1993: 5th

FC Gornyak Gramoteino (Russian: «Горняк» (Грамотеино)) was a Russian football team from Gramoteino, Kemerovo Oblast. It played professionally in 1992 and 1993. Their best result was 5th place in the Zone 7 of the Russian Second Division in 1993.
