= FC Astrateks Astrakhan =

- Full name: Football Club Astrateks Astrakhan
- Founded: 1992
- Dissolved: 1997
- League: Russian Third League, Zone 1
- 1996: 10th

FC Astrateks Astrakhan (Russian: «Астратекс» (Астрахань)) was a Russian football team from Astrakhan. It played professionally from 1992 to 1996. Their best result was 8th place in Zone 1 of the Russian Second Division in 1993.
