= FC Kraneks Ivanovo =

- Full name: Football Club Kraneks Ivanovo
- Founded: 1992
- Dissolved: 1997
- League: Russian Third League, Zone 5
- 1996: 15th

FC Kraneks Ivanovo (Russian: «Кранэкс» (Иваново)) was a Russian football team from Ivanovo. They played professionally from 1993 to 1996. Their best result was 11th place in Zone 5 of the Russian Second Division in 1993.
