= FC Vest Kaliningrad =

- Full name: Football Club Vest Kaliningrad
- Founded: 1993
- Dissolved: 1994
- League: Russian Third League, Zone 4
- 1994: Excluded after 12 games

FC Vest Kaliningrad (Russian: «Вест» (Калининград)) was a Russian football team from Kaliningrad. It played professionally in 1993 and 1994. Their best result was 12th place in Zone 5 of the Russian Second Division in 1993.
