= FC Izumrud-Neftyanik Timashyovsk =

- Full name: Football Club Izumrud-Neftyanik Timashyovsk
- Founded: 1991
- Dissolved: 1999
- League: Amateur Football League, Zone Krasnodar Krai
- 1998: 2nd

FC Izumrud-Neftyanik Timashyovsk (Russian: «Изумруд‑Нефтяник» (Тимашёвск)) was a Russian football team from Timashyovsk. It played professionally in 1991 and 1996. Their best result was 10th place in Zone 2 of the Russian Third League in 1996.

== Team name history ==
- 1991 FC Kuban Timashyovsk
- 1995–1997 FC Izumrud Timashyovsk
- 1998 FC Izumrud-Neftyanik Timashyovsk
