= FC Rekord Aleksandrov =

Russian football club

- Full name: Football Club Rekord Aleksandrov
- Founded: 1993
- Dissolved: 1995
- League: Russian Third League, Zone 3
- 1994: 17th

FC Rekord Aleksandrov (Russian: «Рекорд» (Александров)) was a Russian football team from Alexandrov. It played professionally in 1993 and 1994. Their best result was 20th place in Zone 4 of the Russian Second Division in 1993.
