= FC Khimik Uvarovo =

- Full name: Football Club Khimik Uvarovo
- Founded: 1992
- Dissolved: 1995
- League: Russian Third League, Zone 5
- 1994: 16th

FC Khimik Uvarovo (Russian: «Химик» (Уварово)) was a Russian football team from Uvarovo. It played professionally in 1993 and 1994. Their best result was 14th place in Zone 3 of the Russian Second Division in 1993.
