= FC Torpedo Izhevsk =

- Full name: Football Club Torpedo Izhevsk
- Founded: 1992
- Dissolved: 1994
- League: Russian Second Division, Zone 6
- 1993: 21st

FC Torpedo Izhevsk (Russian: «Торпедо» (Ижевск)) was a Russian football team from Izhevsk. It played professionally in 1992 and 1993. Their best result was 15th place in Zone 5 of the Russian Second Division in 1992.

== Team name history ==
- 1992: FC Torpedo-UdGu Izhevsk
- 1993: FC Torpedo Izhevsk
