= FC Sherstyanik Nevinnomyssk =

- Full name: Football Club Sherstyanik Nevinnomyssk
- Founded: 1991
- Dissolved: 1994
- League: Russian Second Division, Zone 1
- 1993: 9th

FC Sherstyanik Nevinnomyssk (Russian: «Шерстяник» (Невинномыск)) was a Russian football team from Nevinnomyssk. It played professionally from 1991 to 1993. Their best result was 9th place in Zone 1 of the Russian Second Division in 1993.
