= FC Avtoagregat Kineshma =

- Full name: Football Club Avtoagregat Kineshma
- Founded: 1978
- Dissolved: 2003
- League: Amateur Football League, Zone Golden Ring
- 2002: 12th

FC Avtoagregat Kineshma (Russian: «Автоагрегат» (Кинешма)) was a Russian football team from Kineshma. It played professionally from 1978 to 1992. Their best result was 9th place in Zone 1 of the Soviet Second League in 1986.

== Team name history ==
- 1978–1994: FC Volzhanin Kineshma
- 1995–2000: FC Torpedo Kineshma
- 2001–2002: FC Avtoagregat Kineshma
