= FC Uralelektromed Verkhnyaya Pyshma =

- Full name: Football Club Uralelektromed Verkhnyaya Pyshma
- Founded: 1989
- Dissolved: 1994
- League: Russian Second Division, Zone 6
- 1993: 16th

FC Uralelektromed Verkhnyaya Pyshma (Russian: «Уралэлектромедь» (Верхняя Пышма)) was a Russian football team from Verkhnyaya Pyshma. It played professionally in 1989 and 1993. Their best result was 16th place in the Zone 6 of the Russian Second Division in 1993. In 1994 it was converted to the reserves team of FC Uralmash Yekaterinburg called FC Uralmash-d Yekaterinburg.

== Team name history ==
- 1989: FC MTsOP-Metallurg Sverdlovsk (based in Sverdlovsk, now Yekaterinburg)
- 1990–1991: FC Metallurg Verkhnyaya Pyshma
- 1992: FC MTsOP-Metallurg Verkhnyaya Pyshma
- 1993: FC Uralelektromed Verkhnyaya Pyshma
