= FC Stary Oskol =

- Full name: Football Club Stary Oskol
- Founded: 1990
- Dissolved: 2008
- League: Amateur Football League, Zone Chernozemye
- 2007: 15th

FC Stary Oskol (Russian: ФК «Старый Оскол») was a Russian football team from Stary Oskol. It played professionally on two occasions, in 1990 and 1993. Their best result was 13th place in Zone 3 of the Russian Second Division in 1993.

== Team name history ==
- 1990–1994: FC Metallurg Stary Oskol
- 1995: FC Anteks Stary Oskol
- 1996–2002: FC Oskol Stary Oskol
- 2003–2007: FC Stary Oskol
