= FC Gigant Grozny =

Russian football club

- Full name: Football Club Gigant Grozny
- Founded: 1992
- Dissolved: 1995
- League: Russian Third League, Zone 1
- 1994: 17th

FC Gigant Grozny (Russian: «Гигант» (Грозный)) was a Russian football team from Grozny. It played professionally from 1992 to 1994. Their best result was 14th place in Zone 1 of the Russian Second Division in 1993.

== Team name history ==
- 1992–1993 – FC Urartu Grozny
- 1994 – FC Gigant Grozny
