= FC Progress Biysk =

- Full name: Football Club Progress Biysk
- Founded: 1966
- Dissolved: 1993
- League: Russian Second Division, Zone 6
- 1992: 13th

FC Progress Biysk (Russian: «Прогресс» (Бийск)) was a Russian football team from Biysk. It played professionally in 1966–1970 and in 1988–1992. The best result it achieved was 13th place in the Zone 6 of the Russian Second Division in 1992.
