= FC Shakhtyor Artyom =

- Full name: Football Club Shakhtyor Artyom
- Founded: 1991
- Dissolved: 1994
- League: Russian Second Division, Zone 7
- 1993: 6th

FC Shakhtyor Artyom (Russian: «Шахтёр» (Артем)) was a Russian football team from Artyom. It played professionally from 1991 to 1993. Their best result was 6th place in Zone 7 of the Russian Second Division in 1993.
