= FC Torpedo Mytishchi =

- Full name: Football Club Torpedo Mytishchi
- Founded: 1929
- Dissolved: 1996
- Ground: Torpedo Stadium
- Capacity: 1300
- League: Russian Second League, D3
- 1995: 11th

FC Torpedo Mytishchi (Russian: «Торпедо» (Мытищи)) was a Russian football team from Mytishchi, Moscow Region. It played professionally from 1929 to 1995. Their best result was 1st place in Zone 4 of the Russian Second Division in 1993.

== Team name history ==
- 1929–1992: FC Torpedo Mytishchi
- 1993–1994: FC Torpedo-MKB Mytishchi
- 1995: FC Torpedo Mytishchi
