= FC Elektron Vyatskiye Polyany =

- Full name: Football Club Elektron Vyatskiye Polyany
- Founded: 1991
- Dissolved: 1998
- League: Russian Third League, Zone 5
- 1997: 15th

FC Elektron Vyatskiye Polyany (Russian: «Электрон» (Вятские Поляны)) was a Russian football team from Vyatskiye Polyany. It played professionally from 1991 to 1997. Their best result was 11th place in the Zone 6 of the Russian Second Division in 1993.
