= FC Baysachnr Elista =

- Full name: Football Club Baysachnr Elista
- Founded: 1992
- Dissolved: 1994
- League: Russian Second Division, Zone 1
- 1993: 10th

FC Baysachnr Elista (Russian: «Байсачнр» (Элиста)) was a Russian football team from Elista. It played professionally for a single season, taking 10th place in the Zone 1 of the Russian Second Division in 1993. In 1994 it was converted to the reserves team of FC Uralan Elista called FC Uralan-d Elista.

== Team name history ==
- 1992: FC Gilyan Elista
- 1993: FC Baysachnr Elista
