= FC Dynamo Kemerovo =

- Full name: Football Club Dynamo Kemerovo
- Founded: 1991
- Dissolved: 1994
- League: Russian Second Division, Zone 7
- 1993: 4th

FC Dynamo Kemerovo (Russian: ФК Динамо Кемерово) was a Russian football team from Kemerovo. It played professionally from 1991 to 1993. Its best result was 4th place in Zone 7 of the Russian Second Division in 1993.
