= FC Istochnik Rostov-on-Don =

- Full name: Football Club Istochnik Rostov-on-Don
- Founded: 1993
- Dissolved: 1996
- League: Russian Third League, Zone 2
- 1996: Excluded after 14 games

FC Istochnik Rostov-on-Don (Russian: «Источник» (Ростов‑на‑Дону)) was a Russian football team from Rostov-on-Don. It played professionally from 1993 to 1996. Their best result was 6th place in Zone 2 of the Russian Second Division in 1993.
