= FC Politekhnik-92 Barnaul =

- Full name: Football Club Politekhnik-92 Barnaul
- Founded: 1992
- Dissolved: 1995
- League: Russian Second Division, Zone Siberia
- 1994: 12th

FC Politekhnik-92 Barnaul (Russian: «Политехник‑92» (Барнаул)) was a Russian football team from Barnaul. It played professionally from 1992 to 1994. Their best result was 3rd place in the Zone 7 of the Russian Second Division in 1993.
