= FC Azamat Cheboksary =

- Full name: Football Club Azamat Cheboksary
- Founded: 1965
- Dissolved: 1994
- League: Russian Second Division, Zone 6
- 1993: 13th

FC Azamat Cheboksary (Russian: «Азамат» (Чебоксары), Chuvash: Аcамат ФК (Шупашкар)) was a Russian football team from Cheboksary. It played professionally in 1965–1973 and 1978–1993. Their best result was 6th place in the Zone 2 of the Soviet Second League in 1969.

== Team name history ==
- 1965–1977: FC Energiya Cheboksary
- 1978–1991: FC Stal Cheboksary
- 1992–1993: FC Azamat Cheboksary
