= FSC Rybinsk =

- Full name: Football-Sport Club Rybinsk
- Founded: 1937
- Dissolved: 2009
- League: Amateur Football League, Zone Golden Ring
- 2008: 5th

FSC Rybinsk (Russian: ФСК «Рыбинск») was a Russian football team from Rybinsk. It played professionally in 1964–1973, 1976–1995 and 2001–2002. Their best result was winning their zone of the Soviet Second League in 1968, 1969 and of the Russian Second Division in 1993 (they did not advance to the second-highest level on those occasions because there was an additional tournament for zone winners that they did not win in 1968 and 1969 and because Russian league system was re-organized in 1994).

== Team name history ==
- 1937–1946: FC Krylia Sovetov Rybinsk
- 1946–1957: FC Krylia Sovetov Shcherbakov (Rybinsk was renamed temporarily)
- 1957–1963: FC Krylia Sovetov Rybinsk
- 1964–1984: FC Saturn Rybinsk
- 1984–1989: FC Saturn Andropov (Rybinsk was renamed temporarily)
- 1989–1991: FC Saturn Rybinsk
- 1992–1996: FC Vympel Rybinsk
- 1997–1998: FC Burlak Rybinsk
- 1999–2000: FC SKA-Zvezda Rybinsk
- 2001–2006: FC Rybinsk
- 2007–2008: FSC Rybinsk
