= FC Beshtau Lermontov =

- Full name: Football Club Beshtau Lermontov
- Founded: 1992
- Dissolved: 2000
- League: Russian Second Division, Zone South
- 1999: 18th

FC Beshtau Lermontov (Russian: «Бештау» (Лермонтов)) was a Russian football team from Lermontov. It played professionally from 1992 to 1999. Their best result was 10th place in Zone 1 of the Russian Second Division in 1992.
