= FC Lyubertsy =

FC Torpedo Lyubertsy
- Full name: Football Club Torpedo Lyubertsy
- Founded: 1937
- Ground: Torpedo
- Capacity: 5000
- Chairman: Kobzev Nikolay Stefanovich
- Manager: Soloviov Alexey Vladimirovich
- League: Amateur Football League, Zone Center/Moscow region. Group B
- 2013: 2nd in Russian Amateur Football League (Centre Moscow Oblast)
Home colours	Away colours

FK Lyubertsy (Russian: «ФК Люберцы) is a Russian football team from Lyubertsy. It played professionally in 1946, 1966–1969 and 1990–1998. Their best result was 5th place in the Soviet Second League in 1946.

== Team name history ==
- 1937: founded as FK Selmash Lyubertsy
- 1946: FK Traktor Lyubertsy
- 1950: FK Torpedo Lyubertsy
- 1987: FK Torgmash Lyubertsy
- 2008: FK Torpedo Lyubertsy
- 2009: FK Torpedo-Zenit Lyubertsy
- 2010: FK Torpedo Lyubertsy
- 2011: FK Lyubertsy
