= FC Oka =

- Full name: Football Club Oka
- Founded: 1923
- Dissolved: 1997
- League: Russian Third League, Zone 3
- 1996: 16th

FC Oka (Russian: ФК «Ока») was a Russian football team from Kolomna, founded in 1923. It played professionally from 1989 to 1996. Their best result was 8th place in Zone 3 of the Russian Second Division in 1992. In 1997 it merged with FC Avangard-Kortek Kolomna to form FC Kolomna.
