= FC Bulat Cherepovets =

- Full name: Football Club Bulat Cherepovets
- Founded: 1960
- Dissolved: 1997
- League: Russian Third League, Zone 4
- 1996: 13th

FC Bulat Cherepovets (Russian: «Булат» (Череповец)) was a Russian football team from Cherepovets. It played professionally in 1960–1970, 1979–1986 and 1989–1996. Their best result was 2nd place in Zone 1 of the Soviet First League in 1961 (they played on that level from 1960 to 1962).

== Team name history ==
- 1960–1978: FC Metallurg Cherepovets
- 1979–1988: FC Stroitel Cherepovets
- 1989–1991: FC Khimik Cherepovets
- 1992–1996: FC Bulat Cherepovets
