= FC Kosmos Saint Petersburg =

- Full name: Football Club Kosmos Saint Petersburg
- Founded: 1899
- Dissolved: 1993

FC Kosmos Saint Petersburg (Russian: «Космос» Санкт-Петербург) was a Russian football team from Saint Petersburg. It played professionally in 1946, 1947 and from 1989 to 1993. The best result was 13th place in the second-tier Center Zone of the Soviet Second Group in 1947.

== Team name history ==
- 1911–1914: FC Putilovskiy St. Petersburg
- 1914–1923: FC Putilovskiy Petrograd
- 1924: Moskovsky-Narvsky Rayon Team Leningrad
- 1925–1934: FC Krasny Putilovets Leningrad
- 1935–1946: FC Kirovsky Zavod Leningrad
- 1947: FC Dzerzhinets Leningrad
- 1948–1961: FC Kirovsky Zavod Leningrad
- 1962–1991: FC Kirovets Leningrad
- 1991: FC Kirovets St. Petersburg
- 1992: FC Kosmos-Kirovets St. Petersburg
- 1993: FC Kosmos St. Petersburg (dropped out of the league in September)
