= FC Volgodonsk =

- Full name: Football Club Volgodonsk
- Founded: 1980
- Dissolved: 2005
- 2004: Amateur Football League, Zone South, 20th

FC Volgodonsk (Russian: ФК «Волгодонск») was a Russian football team from Volgodonsk. It played professionally from 1980 to 1997, including one season in the second-highest Russian First Division in 1992. Before 1995 it was called Atommash Volgodonsk, named after a local nuclear engineering company (Atommash).
