= FC Torpedo Rubtsovsk =

Russian football club

Coordinates: 51.526725°N 81.222333°E

- Full name: Football Club Torpedo Rubtsovsk
- Founded: 1944
- Ground: Torpedo
- Capacity: 6500
- Chairman: Grant Manasyan
- Manager: Vladimir Tregub
- League: Amateur Football League, Zone Sibir
- 2013: 12th
- Website: http://torpedorub.ru/index/klub/0-5

FC Torpedo Rubtsovsk (Russian: «Торпедо» (Рубцовск)) is a Russian football team from Rubtsovsk. As of 2014, it plays in the Amateur Football League. It played professionally in 1964–1970, 1977–1998 and in 2002. Their best result was 2nd place in Zone 4 of the Soviet Second League in 1980 and in Zone 7 of the Russian Second Division in 1993.

== Team name history ==
- 1944–1999: FC Torpedo Rubtsovsk
- 2000–2005: FC Torpedo-Alttrak Rubtsovsk
- 2006–present: FC Torpedo Rubtsovsk
