= FC Zhemchuzhina Budyonnovsk =

- Full name: Football Club Zhemchuzhina Budyonnovsk
- Founded: 1991
- Dissolved: 2005
- League: Russian Second Division, Zone South
- 2004: 16th

FC Zhemchuzhina Budyonnovsk (Russian: «Жемчужина» (Будённовск)) was a Russian football team from Budyonnovsk. It played professionally from 1991 to 1994 and from 2002 to 2004. Their best result was 6th place in Zone 1 of the Russian Second Division in 1993.

== Team name history ==
- 1991–1994 – FC Druzhba Budyonnovsk
- 2001 – FC Zhemchuzhina-Lukoil Budyonnovsk
- 2002–2004 – FC Zhemchuzhina Budyonnovsk
