= FC SKD Samara =

- Full name: Football Club SKD Samara
- Founded: 1989
- Dissolved: 1996
- League: Russian Second Division, Zone Center
- 1995: 15th

FC SKD Samara (Russian: СКД (Самара)) was a Russian football team from Samara. It played professionally in 1989 and from 1993 to 1995. Their best result was 8th place in Zone 6 of the Russian Second Division in 1993.

== Team name history ==
- 1993–1995: FC SKD Samara
