= FC Yudzhin Samara =

- Full name: Football Club Yudzhin Samara
- Founded: 1990
- Dissolved: 1995
- League: Russian Third League, Zone 5
- 1994: 4th

FC Yudzhin Samara (Russian: «Юджин» (Самара)) was a Russian football team from Samara. It played professionally from 1990 to 1994. Their best result was 9th place in the Russian Second Division (Zone 5 in 1992 and Zone 6 in 1993).

== Team name history ==
- 1990–1991: FC Zarya Podgorny (representing Podgorny, Samara Oblast)
- 1992–1993: FC Zarya Krotovka (representing Krotovka, Samara Oblast)
- 1994: FC Yudzhin Samara
