= 1996 Russian Third League =

Russian Third League
- Season: 1996

The 1996 Russian Third League was the 3rd time competition on the fourth level of Russian football was professional. There were 6 zones with 102 teams starting the competition (6 were excluded before the end of the season).

== Zone 1 ==
=== Overview ===
Team	Head coach
FC Spartak Anapa	Igor Zazroyev
FC Venets Gulkevichi	Anatoli Lyz
FC Dynamo-d Stavropol	
FC Lokomotiv Mineralnye Vody	Aleksandr Babayan
FC Nart Cherkessk	Nurbiy Lakhov
FC Dynamo-Imamat Makhachkala	Igor Korolyov
FC Kuban-d Krasnodar	
FC Anzhi-2 Kaspiysk	Aleksandr Reshetnyak
FC Mozdok	Vladimir Purikhov
FC Astrateks Astrakhan	Boris Bashkin
FC Nart Nartkala	Basir Nauruzov
FC Derbent	Romez Arzumanyan
FC Kabardey-ZET Nizhny Cherek	Aniuar Tkhazeplov
FC Kommunalnik-Druzhba-d Maykop	
PFC Spartak-d Nalchik	
FC Beshtau Lermontov	Dmitri Skryabin
FC Uralan-d Elista	
FC Gofrokarton Digora	Arsen Tsagolov

=== Standings ===
Pos	Team	Pld	W	D	L	GF	GA	GD	Pts	Promotion or relegation
1	Spartak Anapa (A)	34	26	2	6	105	24	+81	80	Promotion to Second League
2	Venets Gulkevichi (A)	34	21	4	9	62	33	+29	67	Promotion to Second League
3	Dynamo-d Stavropol	34	19	6	9	56	44	+12	63	
4	Lokomotiv Mineralnye Vody	34	18	7	9	59	35	+24	61	
5	Nart Cherkessk	34	18	5	11	49	34	+15	59	
6	Dynamo-Imamat Makhachkala	34	17	7	10	56	42	+14	58	
7	Kuban-d Krasnodar	34	18	3	13	72	59	+13	57	
8	Anzhi-2 Kaspiysk	34	17	3	14	67	56	+11	54	
9	Mozdok	34	16	4	14	66	42	+24	52	
10	Astrateks Astrakhan (R)	34	15	7	12	65	51	+14	52	Relegation to Amateur Football League
11	Nart Nartkala	34	14	5	15	51	43	+8	47	
12	Derbent (R)	34	13	8	13	44	37	+7	47	Relegation to Amateur Football League
13	Kabardey-ZET Nizhny Cherek (R)	34	11	12	11	50	52	−2	45	Relegation to Amateur Football League
14	Kommunalnik-Druzhba-d Maykop (R)	34	11	3	20	49	53	−4	36	Relegation to Amateur Football League
15	Spartak-d Nalchik	34	7	5	22	37	87	−50	26	
16	Beshtau Lermontov	34	7	5	22	33	94	−61	26	
17	Uralan-d Elista (R)	34	7	2	25	25	97	−72	23	Relegation to Amateur Football League
18	Gofrokarton Digora (R)	34	6	2	26	33	86	−53	20	Relegation to Amateur Football League

Source: RSSSF
(A) Advance to a further round; (R) Relegated

Notes.

1. FC Uralan-d Elista were excluded from the league after playing 18 games and gaining 23 points. Opponents were awarded a win in the remaining games. They did not play in any national-level competitions in 1997.
2. FC Gofrokarton Digora were excluded from the league after playing 29 games and gaining 20 points. Opponents were awarded a win in the remaining games. They played their first professional season. They did not play in any national-level competitions in 1997.
3. FC Gekris Anapa renamed to FC Spartak.
4. FC Dynamo Makhachkala renamed to FC Dynamo-Imamat.
5. FC Kuban-d Krasnodar and PFC Spartak-d Nalchik played their first professional season.
6. FC Anzhi-2 Makhachkala moved to Kaspiysk.
7. FC Iriston Mozdok renamed to FC Mozdok.
8. FC Astrateks Astrakhan and FC Derbent did not play in any national-level competitions in 1997.
9. FC Spartak-2 Nartkala renamed to FC Nart.
10. FC Kabardey-ZET Nizhny Cherek promoted from the Amateur Football League. They did not play in any national-level competitions in 1997.
11. FC Druzhba-d Maykop renamed to FC Kommunalnik-Druzhba-d Maykop. They did not play in any national-level competitions in 1997.

=== Top goalscorers ===
23 goals

- Gennady Korkin (FC Spartak Anapa)

21 goals

- Aleksandr Kamentsev (FC Venets Gulkevichi)

20 goals

- (Azerbaijan) Narvik Sirkhayev (FC Dynamo-Imamat Makhachkala)

19 goals

- Sultan Chochuyev (FC Kabardey-ZET Nizhny Cherek)
- Timur Zakirov (FC Spartak Anapa)

17 goals

- Andranik Babayan (FC Lokomotiv Mineralnye Vody)
- Aliyar Ismailov (FC Anzhi-2 Kaspiysk)

16 goals

- Eduard Khachaturyan (FC Mozdok)
- Yuri Takliyev (FC Nart Cherkessk)

15 goals

- Andrei Podgurskiy (FC Spartak Anapa)

== Zone 2 ==
=== Overview ===
Team	Head coach
FC Salyut-YuKOS Belgorod	Aleksandr Kryukov
FC Dynamo-Zhemchuzhina-2 Sochi	Vladimir Aleynikov
FC Avangard-Kolos Taganrog	Boris Sinitsyn
FC Spartak-Bratskiy Yuzhny	Sergei Antonkin
FC Kuban Slavyansk-na-Kubani	Nikolai Smirnov
FC Zvezda Gorodishche	Sergei Mukovnin
FC Lokomotiv Yelets	Yuri Raznov
FC Shakhtyor Shakhty	Aleksandr Vyazov
FC Niva Slavyansk-na-Kubani	Oleg Ivanov
FC Izumrud Timashyovsk	Vyacheslav Ledovskikh
FC Metallurg Krasny Sulin	Viktor Shchirov
FC Zhemchuzhina-d Sochi	
FC Dynamo Mikhaylovka	Sergei Andreyev
FC Rotor-d Volgograd	
FC APK Morozovsk	
FC Chernomorets-d Novorossiysk	
FC Rostselmash-d Rostov-on-Don	
FC Istochnik Rostov-on-Don	Ivan Lyakh

=== Standings ===
Pos	Team	Pld	W	D	L	GF	GA	GD	Pts	Promotion or relegation
1	Salyut-YuKOS Belgorod (A)	32	24	5	3	73	22	+51	77	Promotion to Second League
2	Dynamo-Zhemchuzhina-2 Sochi (A)	32	23	3	6	90	42	+48	72	Promotion to Second League
3	Avangard-Kolos Taganrog (R)	32	18	6	8	53	29	+24	60	Relegation to Amateur Football League
4	Spartak-Bratskiy Yuzhny	32	17	5	10	55	37	+18	56	
5	Kuban Slavyansk-na-Kubani	32	17	5	10	56	44	+12	56	
6	Zvezda Gorodishche (R)	32	15	10	7	56	35	+21	55	Relegation to Amateur Football League
7	Lokomotiv Yelets	32	16	5	11	68	36	+32	53	
8	Shakhtyor Shakhty	32	15	6	11	41	31	+10	51	
9	Niva Slavyansk-na-Kubani	32	15	4	13	53	43	+10	49	
10	Izumrud Timashyovsk (R)	32	14	3	15	62	57	+5	45	Relegation to Amateur Football League
11	Metallurg Krasny Sulin	32	12	6	14	46	45	+1	42	
12	Zhemchuzhina-d Sochi	32	11	4	17	55	64	−9	37	
13	Dynamo Mikhaylovka	32	11	3	18	41	57	−16	36	
14	Rotor-d Volgograd	32	7	7	18	37	71	−34	28	
15	APK Morozovsk (R)	32	7	1	24	32	86	−54	22	Relegation to Amateur Football League
16	Chernomorets-d Novorossiysk (R)	32	6	3	23	31	94	−63	21	Relegation to Amateur Football League
17	Rostselmash-d Rostov-on-Don	32	3	6	23	30	86	−56	15	

Source: RSSSF
(A) Advance to a further round; (R) Relegated

Notes.

1. FC Istochnik Rostov-on-Don were excluded from the league after playing 14 games and gaining 30 points. All their results were discarded. They did not play in any national-level competitions in 1997.
2. FC Salyut-YuKOS Belgorod and FC Lokomotiv Yelets awarded 1 home win each.
3. FC Salyut Belgorod renamed to FC Salyut-YuKOS.
4. FC Dynamo-Zhemchuzhina-2 Sochi played their first professional season.
5. FC Avangard-Kolos Taganrog and FC Chernomorets-d Novorossiysk played their first professional season. They did not play in any national-level competitions in 1997.
6. FC Zvezda Gorodishche did not play in any national-level competitions in 1997.
7. FC Izumrud Timashyovsk promoted from the Amateur Football League.
8. FC Rostselmash-d Rostov-on-Don did not play professionally in 1995.

=== Top goalscorers ===
32 goals

- Stanislav Dubrovin (FC Dynamo-Zhemchuzhina-2 Sochi)

20 goals

- Aleksandr Bocharnikov (FC Kuban Slavyansk-na-Kubani)
- Igor Stasyuk (FC Izumrud Timashyovsk)

15 goals

- Oleg Akulov (FC Zhemchuzhina-d Sochi)

14 goals

- Yevgeni Kuzka (FC Lokomotiv Yelets)

13 goals

- Sergei Borodin (FC Zvezda Gorodishche)
- Vladimir Grishchenko (FC Niva Slavyansk-na-Kubani / FC Chernomorets-d Novorossiysk)
- (Armenia) Manuk Kakosyan (FC Dynamo-Zhemchuzhina-2 Sochi)
- Sergei Sedov (FC Avangard-Kolos Taganrog)

12 goals

- Andrei Fomichyov (FC Salyut-YuKOS Belgorod)
- Tatul Mkhitaryan (FC Dynamo Mikhaylovka)
- Andrei Pakhtusov (FC Niva Slavyansk-na-Kubani)
- Aleksandr Shtyn (FC Zhemchuzhina-d Sochi)
- Yuri Veretin (FC Lokomotiv Yelets)

== Zone 3 ==
=== Overview ===
Team	Head coach
FC Dynamo-d Moscow	
FC Mosenergo Moscow	Valentin Sysoyev
FC Avtomobilist Noginsk	Vladimir Bodrov
FC Spartak-d Moscow	
FC Torpedo-Luzhniki-d Moscow	
FC Roda Moscow	Vladimir Opochinskiy
FC Avangard-Kortek Kolomna	Viktor Korneyev
FC Fabus Bronnitsy	Vladimir Sautin
FC Mashinostroitel Sergiyev Posad	Andrei Leksakov
PFC CSKA-d Moscow	
FC Torgmash Lyubertsy	Anatoli Leshchenkov
FC Monolit Moscow	Yuri Vereykin
FC Titan Reutov	Valeri Vdovin
FC Krasnogvardeyets Moscow	Aleksandr Rakov
FC Dynamo-2 Moscow	
FC Oka Kolomna	Aleksandr Borisenkov
FC Obninsk	Yuri Mosolev
FC Chertanovo Moscow	Mikhail Karatayev
FC Smena Moscow	Vladimir Yevseyev
FC Lokomotiv-d Moscow	
FC TRASKO Moscow	Aleksandr Gusev

=== Standings ===
Pos	Team	Pld	W	D	L	GF	GA	GD	Pts	Promotion or relegation
1	Dynamo-d Moscow	38	28	6	4	87	27	+60	90	
2	Mosenergo Moscow (A)	38	27	6	5	84	21	+63	87	Promotion to Second League
3	Avtomobilist Noginsk (A)	38	26	7	5	84	30	+54	85	Promotion to Second League
4	Spartak-d Moscow	38	26	7	5	91	33	+58	85	
5	Torpedo-Luzhniki-d Moscow	38	21	9	8	70	37	+33	72	
6	Roda Moscow	38	21	6	11	79	52	+27	69	
7	Avangard-Kortek Kolomna	38	18	4	16	49	47	+2	58	
8	Fabus Bronnitsy	38	16	7	15	51	59	−8	55	
9	Mashinostroitel Sergiyev Posad	38	15	8	15	53	63	−10	53	
10	CSKA-d Moscow	38	12	11	15	52	54	−2	47	
11	Torgmash Lyubertsy	38	12	10	16	42	56	−14	46	
12	Monolit Moscow	38	12	10	16	39	44	−5	46	
13	Titan Reutov	38	12	8	18	44	59	−15	44	
14	Krasnogvardeyets Moscow	38	11	9	18	43	53	−10	42	
15	Dynamo-2 Moscow	38	10	8	20	40	58	−18	38	
16	Oka Kolomna (R)	38	9	9	20	33	73	−40	36	Relegation to Amateur Football League
17	Obninsk (R)	38	6	11	21	34	86	−52	29	Relegation to Amateur Football League
18	Chertanovo Moscow	38	6	9	23	23	67	−44	27	
19	Smena Moscow (R)	38	5	11	22	27	69	−42	26	Relegation to Amateur Football League
20	Lokomotiv-d Moscow	38	5	8	25	32	69	−37	23	

Source: RSSSF
(A) Advance to a further round; (R) Relegated

Notes.

1. FC TRASKO Moscow were excluded from the league after playing 18 games and gaining 7 points. All their results were discarded.
2. FC Mashinostroitel Sergiyev Posad awarded 1 home win.
3. FC Dynamo-d Moscow was not promoted as reserve teams were not eligible for promotion.
4. FC Torpedo-d Moscow renamed to FC Torpedo-Luzhniki-d.
5. FC Roda Moscow promoted from the Amateur Football League.
6. FC Obninsk did not play professionally in 1995 and did not play in any national-level competitions in 1997.

=== Top goalscorers ===
25 goals

- Sergei Artyomov (FC Dynamo-d Moscow)
- Sergei Bespalykh (FC Avangard-Kortek Kolomna)

19 goals

- Igor Reutov (FC Avtomobilist Noginsk)

18 goals

- Anatoli Balaluyev (FC Avtomobilist Noginsk)

17 goals

- Aleksandr Samorodov (FC Mosenergo Moscow)

16 goals

- Nikolai Klikin (FC Dynamo-2 Moscow)

15 goals

- Aleksandr Kuptsov (FC Fabus Bronnitsy)

14 goals

- Sergei Burtsev (FC Torgmash Lyubertsy)
- Andrei Dyomkin (FC Dynamo-d Moscow)
- Konstantin Kaynov (FC Fabus Bronnitsy)

== Zone 4 ==
=== Overview ===
Team	Head coach
FC Orekhovo Orekhovo-Zuyevo	Leonid Ostroushko
FC Volga Tver	Yuri Zubkov
FC Oryol	Vladimir Brykin
FC Torpedo Vladimir	Nikolai Pavelyev
FC Dynamo Bryansk	Viktor Zimin
FC Mashinostroitel Pskov	Sergei Markelov
FC Neftyanik Yaroslavl	Valentin Volkov
FC Zenit-d St. Petersburg	
FC Luch Tula	Aleksandr Chimbiryov
FC Lokomotiv-d St. Petersburg	
FC Spartak Bryansk	Aleksandr Sekselev
FC Kristall Dyatkovo	Nikolai Shipka
FC Bulat Cherepovets	Aleksandr Sokolov
FC Karelia-Erzi Petrozavodsk	Aleksei Strepetov
FC Spartak Kostroma	Valeri Volchanovskiy
FC Volochanin Vyshny Volochyok	Nikolai Yakovlev

=== Standings ===
Pos	Team	Pld	W	D	L	GF	GA	GD	Pts	Promotion or relegation
1	Orekhovo Orekhovo-Zuyevo (A)	30	19	6	5	58	25	+33	63	Promotion to Second League
2	Volga Tver (A)	30	18	9	3	42	21	+21	63	Promotion to Second League
3	Oryol (A)	30	17	11	2	48	15	+33	62	Promotion to Second League
4	Torpedo Vladimir	30	17	4	9	47	35	+12	55	
5	Dynamo Bryansk	30	14	10	6	52	27	+25	52	
6	Mashinostroitel Pskov	30	14	6	10	38	32	+6	48	
7	Neftyanik Yaroslavl	30	13	8	9	44	29	+15	47	
8	Zenit-d St. Petersburg	30	11	7	12	29	28	+1	40	
9	Luch Tula	30	10	8	12	40	29	+11	38	
10	Lokomotiv-d St. Petersburg	30	10	7	13	32	44	−12	37	
11	Spartak Bryansk	30	7	10	13	43	52	−9	31	
12	Kristall Dyatkovo (R)	30	6	9	15	23	44	−21	27	Relegation to Amateur Football League
13	Bulat Cherepovets (R)	30	6	8	16	22	40	−18	26	Relegation to Amateur Football League
14	Karelia-Erzi Petrozavodsk (R)	30	5	9	16	24	49	−25	24	Relegation to Amateur Football League
15	Spartak Kostroma	30	5	8	17	20	52	−32	23	
16	Volochanin Vyshny Volochyok	30	6	4	20	19	59	−40	22	

Source: RSSSF
(A) Advance to a further round; (R) Relegated

Notes.

1. FC Karelia-Erzi Petrozavodsk were excluded from the league after playing 24 games and gaining 24 points. Opponents were awarded a win in the remaining games. They did not play professionally in 1995 and did not play in any national-level competitions in 1997
2. FC Trion-Volga Tver renamed to FC Volga.
3. FC Lokomotiv-d St. Petersburg played their first professional season.
4. FC Spartak Bryansk promoted from the Amateur Football League.
5. FC Kristall Dyatkovo and FC Bulat Cherepovets did not play in any national-level competitions in 1997.

=== Top goalscorers ===
18 goals

- Vladislav Khakhalev (FC Torpedo Vladimir)

15 goals

- Ruslan Usikov (FC Dynamo Bryansk)

14 goals

- Igor Aksyonov (FC Neftyanik Yaroslavl)
- Valeri Korneyev (FC Spartak Bryansk)

13 goals

- (Belarus) Sergey Ulezlo (FC Volga Tver)

11 goals

- Aleksei Barikov (FC Oryol)
- Pavel Sukhov (FC Orekhovo Orekhovo-Zuyevo)

10 goals

- Igor Varakin (FC Orekhovo Orekhovo-Zuyevo)

9 goals

- Stanislav Borisov (FC Oryol)

8 goals

- Yevgeni Leonov (FC Karelia-Erzi Petrozavodsk)
- Andrei Syomin (FC Oryol)
- Konstantin Taptov (FC Spartak Bryansk)

== Zone 5 ==
=== Overview ===
Team	Head coach
FC Spartak Tambov	Vladimir Kovylin
FC Volga Ulyanovsk	Sergei Sedyshev
FC Salyut Saratov	Vladimir Khoroltsev
FC Energetik Uren	Oleg Yevtushenko
FC Kristall Sergach	Viktor Pavlyukov
FC Metallurg Vyksa	Mikhail Beketov
FC Biokhimik-Mordovia Saransk	Igor Shinkarenko
FC Stroitel Morshansk	Vyacheslav Vlasov
FC Iskra Engels	Yevgeni Kostyryachenko
FC Progress Zelenodolsk	Aleksandr Klobukov
FC Khimik Dzerzhinsk	Mikhail Senyurin
FC Volga Balakovo	Aleksandr Krokhin
FC Neftyanik Pokhvistnevo	Anatoli Valkov
FC Druzhba Yoshkar-Ola	Valeri Bogdanov
FC Kraneks Ivanovo	Yuri Krivolapov
FC Lokomotiv-d Nizhny Novgorod	

=== Standings ===
Pos	Team	Pld	W	D	L	GF	GA	GD	Pts	Promotion or relegation
1	Spartak Tambov (A)	30	20	8	2	74	17	+57	68	Promotion to Second League
2	Volga Ulyanovsk (A)	30	20	7	3	63	14	+49	67	Promotion to Second League
3	Salyut Saratov	30	16	9	5	45	25	+20	57	
4	Energetik Uren	30	15	7	8	41	32	+9	52	
5	Kristall Sergach (R)	30	14	5	11	50	32	+18	47	Relegation to Amateur Football League
6	Metallurg Vyksa	30	12	9	9	36	31	+5	45	
7	Biokhimik-Mordovia Saransk	30	12	7	11	40	32	+8	43	
8	Stroitel Morshansk	30	11	8	11	38	38	0	41	
9	Iskra Engels	30	11	6	13	44	47	−3	39	
10	Progress Zelenodolsk	30	10	8	12	42	44	−2	38	
11	Khimik Dzerzhinsk	30	9	11	10	24	31	−7	38	
12	Volga Balakovo	30	10	6	14	31	49	−18	36	
13	Neftyanik Pokhvistnevo	30	8	9	13	36	48	−12	33	
14	Druzhba Yoshkar-Ola	30	7	9	14	28	48	−20	30	
15	Kraneks Ivanovo (R)	30	2	8	20	21	75	−54	14	Relegation to Amateur Football League
16	Lokomotiv-d Nizhny Novgorod	30	2	5	23	15	65	−50	11	

Source: RSSSF
(A) Advance to a further round; (R) Relegated

Notes.

1. FC Energetik Uren and FC Lokomotiv-d Nizhny Novgorod played their first professional season.
2. FC Biokhimik-Mordovia Saransk promoted from the Amateur Football League where it played in 1995 as FC Biokhimik Saransk.
3. FC Stroitel Morshansk and FC Iskra Engels promoted from the Amateur Football League.
4. FC Kraneks Ivanovo did not play in any national-level competitions in 1997.

=== Top goalscorers ===
25 goals

- Aleksandr Khalzov (FC Spartak Tambov)

19 goals

- Sergei Pervushin (FC Spartak Tambov)

15 goals

- Vladimir Nosov (FC Kristall Sergach)

14 goals

- Dmitri Borisko (FC Volga Ulyanovsk)
- Andrei Eskov (FC Iskra Engels)

12 goals

- Boris Goncharov (FC Spartak Tambov)
- Vladimir Kopylov (FC Druzhba Yoshkar-Ola)

11 goals

- Aleksandr Fyodorov (FC Progress Zelenodolsk)

10 goals

- Eduard Bazarov (FC Volga Balakovo)
- Sergei Glazunov (FC Salyut Saratov)
- Yuri Plyaskevich (FC Stroitel Morshansk)
- Vladimir Rokunov (FC Biokhimik-Mordovia Saransk)

== Zone 6 ==
=== Overview ===
Team	Head coach
FC Sodovik Sterlitamak	Sergei Maksimov
FC Uralets Nizhny Tagil	Anatoli Garenskikh
FC Metiznik Magnitogorsk	Aleksandr Kukushkin
FC Dynamo Perm	Anatoli Timofeyev
FC Gazovik Orenburg	Viktor Dyomkin
FC Neftyanik Bugulma	German Bobek
FC Trubnik Kamensk-Uralsky	Leonid Mosolov
FC Elektron Vyatskiye Polyany	Yuri Osin
FC Dynamo-Gazovik-d Tyumen	
FC Gornyak Kushva	Viktor Konshin
FC Gornyak Kachkanar	Viktor Shlyayev
FC Uralmash-d Yekaterinburg	
FC KAMAZ-Chally-d Naberezhnye Chelny	

=== Standings ===
Pos	Team	Pld	W	D	L	GF	GA	GD	Pts	Promotion or relegation
1	Sodovik Sterlitamak (A)	24	18	1	5	49	16	+33	55	Promotion to Second League
2	Uralets Nizhny Tagil	24	17	3	4	51	17	+34	54	
3	Metiznik Magnitogorsk	24	16	3	5	54	23	+31	51	
4	Dynamo Perm	24	15	6	3	56	16	+40	51	
5	Gazovik Orenburg	24	12	2	10	32	29	+3	38	
6	Neftyanik Bugulma	24	10	4	10	38	27	+11	34	
7	Trubnik Kamensk-Uralsky	24	9	7	8	33	39	−6	34	
8	Elektron Vyatskiye Polyany	24	8	7	9	28	30	−2	31	
9	Dynamo-Gazovik-d Tyumen (R)	24	8	3	13	24	46	−22	27	Relegation to Amateur Football League
10	Gornyak Kushva (R)	24	7	4	13	19	37	−18	25	Relegation to Amateur Football League
11	Gornyak Kachkanar	24	7	1	16	23	48	−25	22	
12	Uralmash-d Yekaterinburg (R)	24	4	3	17	27	58	−31	15	Relegation to Amateur Football League
13	KAMAZ-Chally-d Naberezhnye Chelny	24	2	2	20	18	66	−48	8	

Source: RSSSF
(A) Advance to a further round; (R) Relegated

Notes.

1. FC Gornyak-Vanadiy Kachkanar renamed to FC Gornyak. Gornyak was excluded from the league after playing 12 games and gaining 22 points. Opponents were awarded a win in the remaining games.
2. FC Dynamo Perm awarded 1 home win.
3. FC Planeta Bugulma renamed to FC Neftyanik.
4. FC Dynamo-Gazovik-d Tyumen, FC Gornyak Kushva and FC Uralmash-d Yekaterinburg did not play in any national-level competitions in 1997.

=== Top goalscorers ===
13 goals

- Konstantin Ilyinykh (FC Dynamo Perm)

12 goals

- Aleksei Alekseyev (FC Uralets Nizhny Tagil)
- Yuri Petrov (FC Dynamo Perm)

11 goals

- Sergei Balandin (FC Metiznik Magnitogorsk)

9 goals

- Sergei Afanasyev (FC Metiznik Magnitogorsk)
- Igor Degtyaryov (FC Gazovik Orenburg)
- Albert Gubaydulin (FC Sodovik Sterlitamak)
- Dmitri Zakharov (FC Gornyak Kachkanar)

8 goals

- Vyacheslav Khovanskiy (FC Trubnik Kamensk-Uralsky)
- Yuri Panov (FC Sodovik Sterlitamak)
- Andrei Sviridov (FC Metiznik Magnitogorsk)
- Yuri Vetlugayev (FC Uralets Nizhny Tagil)

== See also ==
- 1996 Russian Top League
- 1996 Russian First League
- 1996 Russian Second League
