= 1994 Russian Third League =

Russian Third League
- Season: 1994

The 1994 Russian Third League was the first time the competition of the fourth level of Russian football was professional. There were six zones with 105 teams starting the competition in total (8 of them were excluded before the end of the season).

== Zone 1 ==
=== Overview ===
Team	Head coach
FC Avtozapchast Baksan	Yuri Kotov
FC Energiya Pyatigorsk	Sergei Razaryonov
FC Niva Slavyansk-na-Kubani	Vladimir Brazhnikov
FC Nart Cherkessk	Nurbiy Lakhov
FC Kuban Slavyansk-na-Kubani	Nikolai Smirnov
FC Olimp Kislovodsk	Aleksandr Grosberg
FC Argo Kaspiysk	Magomed-Rasul Akhmedov
FC Iriston Mozdok	Vitali Abayev
FC Dynamo-d Stavropol	Sergei Gorb
FC Uralan-d Elista	Aleksandr Skrynnikov
FC Torpedo Armavir	Viktor Batalin (until June); Khamza Bagapov (from July)
FC Spartak Alagir	Valeri Karginov
FC Lokomotiv Mineralnye Vody	Nikolai Shvydkiy
FC Kolos-2 Krasnodar	Mikhail Ruban / Vasili Pravilo
FC Beshtau Lermontov	Aleksandr Vershenko
FC Druzhba Budyonnovsk	Yuri Safaryan
FC Gigant Grozny	Muslim Daliyev
FC Khimik Belorechensk	Yuri Filippov

=== Standings ===
Pos	Team	Pld	W	D	L	GF	GA	GD	Pts	Promotion or relegation
1	Avtozapchast Baksan (A)	32	22	5	5	81	31	+50	49	Promotion to Second League
2	Energiya Pyatigorsk (A)	32	20	8	4	63	25	+38	48	Promotion to Second League
3	Niva Slavyansk-na-Kubani	32	20	4	8	67	31	+36	44	
4	Nart Cherkessk	32	19	6	7	51	34	+17	44	
5	Kuban Slavyansk-na-Kubani	32	21	1	10	76	31	+45	43	
6	Olimp Kislovodsk	32	17	9	6	59	27	+32	43	
7	Argo Kaspiysk	32	18	2	12	54	45	+9	38	
8	Iriston Mozdok	32	17	3	12	52	45	+7	37	
9	Dynamo-d Stavropol	32	15	6	11	53	27	+26	36	
10	Uralan-d Elista	32	12	7	13	42	50	−8	31	
11	Armavir	32	12	4	16	44	49	−5	28	
12	Spartak Alagir	32	10	7	15	46	63	−17	27	
13	Lokomotiv Mineralnye Vody	32	9	8	15	34	46	−12	26	
14	Kolos-2 Krasnodar	32	7	1	24	31	76	−45	15	
15	Beshtau Lermontov	32	5	4	23	31	70	−39	14	
16	Druzhba Budyonnovsk (R)	32	2	6	24	11	72	−61	10	Relegation to Amateur Football League
17	Gigant Grozny (R)	32	3	3	26	13	89	−76	9	Relegation to Amateur Football League

Source: RSSSF
(A) Advance to a further round; (R) Relegated

Notes:

1. FC Kolos-2 Krasnodar were excluded from the league after playing 25 games. The opponents were awarded a win in the remaining games.
2. FC Urartu Grozny renamed to FC Gigant Grozny. Gigant was excluded from the league after playing 18 games. The opponents were awarded a win in the remaining games. Gigant did not play in national competitions in 1995 due to First Chechen War.
3. FC Druzhba Budyonnovsk was excluded from the league after playing 15 games. The opponents were awarded a win in the remaining games, except for the game against FC Gigant Grozny, in which both teams were awarded a loss. Druzhba did not play in national competitions in 1995.
4. FC Khimik Belorechensk were excluded from the league after playing 14 games. All the results of their games were discarded. Khimik did not play in national competitions in 1995.
5. FC Iriston Vladikavkaz were awarded 2 home wins.
6. FC Niva Slavyansk-na-Kubani, FC Kuban Slavyansk-na-Kubani and FC Spartak Alagir were awarded 1 home win each.
7. FC Argo Kaspiysk were awarded 1 home loss and 1 home win.
8. FC Mashuk Pyatigorsk renamed to FC Energiya.
9. FC Kuban Barannikovsky moved to Slavyansk-na-Kubani.
10. FC Asmaral Kislovodsk renamed to FC Olimp.
11. FC Kaspiy Kaspiysk renamed to FC Argo.
12. FC Iriston Mozdok and FC Spartak Alagir promoted from the Amateur Football League.
13. FC Dynamo-d Stavropol played their first professional season.
14. FC Uralan-d Elista converted from FC Baysachnr Elista.
15. FC Lokomotiv Mineralnye Vody did not play on the national level in 1993.

=== Top goalscorers ===
22 goals

- Nikolay Komlichenko (FC Niva Slavyansk-na-Kubani)

21 goals

- Yevgeni Likhachyov (FC Avtozapchast Baksan)

17 goals

- Arif Romanov (FC Olimp Kislovodsk)

14 goals

- Oleg Alyoshin (FC Kuban Slavyansk-na-Kubani)
- Vladimir Grishchenko (FC Slavyansk Slavyansk-na-Kubani)
- Oleg Kozemov (FC Energiya Pyatigorsk)
- Abilfez Madanov (FC Energiya Pyatigorsk)

13 goals

- Aleksandr Durnev (FC Beshtau Lermontov)

12 goals

- Andrei Stepanov (FC Torpedo Armavir)

11 goals

- Giya Chokhonelidze (FC Kolos-2 Krasnodar)
- Aleksei Kozlov (FC Dynamo-d Stavropol)

== Zone 2 ==
=== Overview ===
Team	Head coach
FC Volgar Astrakhan	Vladimir Yerofeyev
FC SKA Rostov-on-Don	Valeri Sinau
FC Istochnik Rostov-on-Don	Kamil Akchurin
FC Avangard Kursk	Aleksandr Galkin
FC Shakhtyor Shakhty	Valeri Volodin
FC Khimik Dankov	Igor Lysenko
FC Turbostroitel Kaluga	Georgi Kolmogorov
FC Ingushetiya Nazran	Timur Kuriyev
FC Atommash Volgodonsk	Valeri Zubakov
FC Avangard Kamyshin	Vladimir Nemchenko
FC Oryol	Yuri Samulistov
FC Dynamo Bryansk	Viktor Zimin
FC Spartak-Bratskiy Yuzhny	Sergei Antonkin
FC Kolos Bykovo	Sergei Andreyev
FC Metallurg Krasny Sulin	Adel Kaneyev
FC Rotor-d Volgograd	Yuri Marushkin
FC Kristall Dyatkovo	Aleksandr Vasin

=== Standings ===
Pos	Team	Pld	W	D	L	GF	GA	GD	Pts	Promotion or relegation
1	Volgar Astrakhan (A)	32	21	4	7	61	20	+41	46	Promotion to Second League
2	SKA Rostov-on-Don (A)	32	20	4	8	44	26	+18	44	Promotion to Second League
3	Istochnik Rostov-on-Don	32	17	10	5	54	31	+23	44	
4	Avangard Kursk	32	19	4	9	51	39	+12	42	
5	Shakhtyor Shakhty	32	17	8	7	43	31	+12	42	
6	Khimik Dankov (R)	32	17	6	9	46	27	+19	40	Relegation to Amateur Football League
7	Turbostroitel Kaluga	32	15	6	11	47	38	+9	36	
8	Ingushetiya Nazran	32	15	5	12	57	32	+25	35	
9	Atommash Volgodonsk	32	14	6	12	42	42	0	34	
10	Avangard Kamyshin (R)	32	14	4	14	44	50	−6	32	Relegation to Amateur Football League
11	Oryol	32	12	7	13	48	39	+9	31	
12	Dynamo Bryansk	32	11	6	15	38	40	−2	28	
13	Spartak-Bratskiy Yuzhny	32	11	3	18	47	66	−19	25	
14	Kolos Bykovo (R)	32	9	4	19	37	60	−23	22	Relegation to Amateur Football League
15	Metallurg Krasny Sulin	32	6	6	20	30	60	−30	18	
16	Rotor-d Volgograd	32	5	7	20	34	62	−28	17	
17	Kristall Dyatkovo	32	4	0	28	15	75	−60	8	

Source: RSSSF
(A) Advance to a further round; (R) Relegated

Notes:

1. FC Kristall Dyatkovo were promoted from the Amateur Football League. Kristall were excluded from the league after playing 24 games. The opponents were awarded a win in the remaining games.
2. FC Ingushetiya Nazran were awarded 9 home wins.
3. FC Khimik Dankov were promoted from the Amateur Football League. They returned to that level after the season.
4. FC Kolos Bykovo were promoted from the Amateur Football League. They did not participate in any national-level competitions in 1995.
5. FC Ingushetiya Nazran and FC Spartak-Bratskiy Yuzhny played their first professional season.
6. FC Avangard Kamyshin did not participate in any national-level competitions in 1995.

=== Top goalscorers ===
23 goals

- Yevgeni Kuzka (FC Khimik Dankov)

18 goals

- Viktor Kontsevenko (FC Shakhtyor Shakhty)

17 goals

- Valeri Klimov (FC Oryol)

16 goals

- Konstantin Boyko (FC Istochnik Rostov-on-Don)

14 goals

- Yuri Sirota (FC Atommash Volgodonsk)

13 goals

- Andrei Anisimov (FC Volgar Astrakhan)

12 goals

- Mikhail Sukhorukov (FC Avangard Kursk)

11 goals

- Vitali Ivanov (FC Kolos Bykovo)

10 goals

- (Kazakhstan) Yuri Aksenov (FC Rotor-d Volgograd)
- Sergei Dogunkov (FC Volgar Astrakhan)
- Kamil Ferkhanov (FC Turbostroitel Kaluga)
- Oleg Popov (FC Avangard Kamyshin)
- Otari Pruidze (FC Volgar Astrakhan)

== Zone 3 ==
=== Overview ===
Team	Head coach
FC Spartak-d Moscow	Viktor Zernov
FC Saturn Ramenskoye	Vitali Chugrishin
FC Spartak Shchyolkovo	Valeri Tretyakov
FC Dynamo-d Moscow	Nikolai Gontar / Adamas Golodets
FC Don Novomoskovsk	Leonid Lipovoy
FC Mosenergo Moscow	Valentin Sysoyev
FC Torgmash Lyubertsy	Anatoli Leshchenkov
FC Avtomobilist Noginsk	Eduard Danilov
PFC CSKA-d Moscow	Aleksandr Kolpovskiy
FC Rossiya Moscow	Leonid Pribylovskiy
FC Torpedo-MKB Mytishchi	Vyacheslav Zhuravlyov
FC TRASKO Moscow	Sergei Rozhkov
FC Mashinostroitel Sergiyev Posad	Andrei Leksakov
FC Kosmos Dolgoprudny	Aleksandr Logunov
FC Torpedo-d Moscow	Sergei Petrenko
PFC CSKA-2 Moscow	Sergei Berezin
FC Rekord Aleksandrov	Valentin Baturin
FC Dynamo-2 Moscow	Yevgeni Baykov
FC Titan Reutov	Aleksei Belenkov
FC Gigant Voskresensk	Aleksandr Borisenkov
FC Chertanovo Moscow	Viktor Razumovskiy
FC Lokomotiv-d Moscow	Vladimir Korotkov
FC Oka Kolomna	Yuri Karamyan (until May)
FC Asmaral-d Moscow	Vladimir Mikhaylov

=== Standings ===
Pos	Team	Pld	W	D	L	GF	GA	GD	Pts	Promotion or relegation
1	Spartak-d Moscow	46	37	6	3	165	30	+135	80	
2	Saturn Ramenskoye (A)	46	35	8	3	115	32	+83	78	Promotion to Second League
3	Spartak Shchyolkovo (A)	46	36	5	5	129	30	+99	77	Promotion to Second League
4	Dynamo-d Moscow	46	26	13	7	122	67	+55	65	
5	Don Novomoskovsk	46	27	10	9	70	31	+39	64	
6	Mosenergo Moscow	46	26	10	10	81	62	+19	62	
7	Torgmash Lyubertsy	46	23	11	12	70	57	+13	57	
8	Avtomobilist Noginsk	46	22	11	13	80	58	+22	55	
9	CSKA-d Moscow	46	21	12	13	97	64	+33	54	
10	Rossiya Moscow	46	20	10	16	54	45	+9	50	
11	Torpedo-MKB Mytishchi	46	17	9	20	58	64	−6	43	
12	TRASKO Moscow	46	16	11	19	76	70	+6	43	
13	Mashinostroitel Sergiyev Posad	46	16	11	19	67	76	−9	43	
14	Kosmos Dolgoprudny	46	14	11	21	66	78	−12	39	
15	Torpedo-d Moscow	46	13	13	20	59	74	−15	39	
16	CSKA-2 Moscow (R)	46	15	8	23	73	87	−14	38	Relegation to Amateur Football League
17	Rekord Aleksandrov (R)	46	11	13	22	46	95	−49	35	Relegation to Amateur Football League
18	Dynamo-2 Moscow	46	11	13	22	40	78	−38	35	
19	Titan Reutov	46	13	6	27	43	78	−35	32	
20	Gigant Voskresensk (R)	46	12	5	29	53	130	−77	29	Relegation to Amateur Football League
21	Chertanovo Moscow	46	11	4	31	53	98	−45	26	
22	Lokomotiv-d Moscow	46	10	6	30	46	91	−45	26	
23	Oka Kolomna	46	6	12	28	39	99	−60	24	
24	Asmaral-d Moscow	46	4	2	40	25	133	−108	10	

Source: RSSSF
(A) Advance to a further round; (R) Relegated

Notes:

1. FC Asmaral-d Moscow were excluded from the league after playing 33 games. The opponents were awarded a win in the remaining games.
2. FC Don Novomoskovsk and FC Dynamo-2 Moscow were awarded 1 home wins each.
3. PFC CSKA-d Moscow, FC Kosmos Dolgoprudny and FC Oka Kolomna were awarded 1 home loss each.
4. FC Spartak-d Moscow were not promoted to the Second League as they were the reserve team of FC Spartak Moscow and reserve teams were not eligible for promotion.
5. FC Avtomobilist Noginsk, FC Rossiya Moscow and FC Mashinostroitel Sergiyev Posad promoted from the Amateur Football League.
6. PFC CSKA-2 Moscow and FC Rekord Aleksandrov did not participate in any national-level competitions in 1995.
7. FC Viktor-Gigant Voskresensk renamed to FC Gigant. FC Gigant did not participate in any national-level competitions in 1995.
8. FC Kosmos-Kvest Dolgoprudny renamed to FC Kosmos.
9. FC SUO Moscow renamed to FC Chertanovo.

=== Top goalscorers ===
30 goals

- (Armenia) Andrey Movsisyan (FC Spartak-d Moscow)

28 goals

- Aleksandr Antonov (FC Spartak Shchyolkovo)

26 goals

- Rashid Gallakberov (FC Saturn Ramenskoye)

24 goals

- Aleksei Kutsenko (FC Dynamo-d Moscow)

23 goals

- Aleksandr Drozdov (FC Torgmash Lyubertsy)
- Andrey Tikhonov (FC Spartak-d Moscow)

22 goals

- Sergei Gavrilin (FC Kosmos Dolgoprudny)

21 goals

- Andrei Bulanov (FC Torpedo-MKB Mytishchi)
- Igor Reutov (FC Avtomobilist Noginsk)
- Igor Voronin (FC Mosenergo Moscow)

== Zone 4 ==
=== Overview ===
Team	Head coach
FC Kristall Smolensk	Igor Belanovich
FC Gatchina	Nikolai Gosudarenkov
FC Bulat Cherepovets	Aleksandr Sokolov
FC Mashinostroitel Pskov	Yuri Veresov
FC Iskra Smolensk	Anatoli Olkhovik
FC Prometey-Dynamo St. Petersburg	Aleksandr Fyodorov
FC Volochanin Vyshny Volochyok	Igor Bychkov
FC Khimik Koryazhma	Vladimir Grigoryev
FC Baltika-d Kaliningrad	Viktor Karman
FC Neftyanik Yaroslavl	Valentin Volkov
FC Spartak Kostroma	Vyacheslav Skoropekin
FC Kraneks Ivanovo	Aleksandr Chanov
FC Metallurg Pikalyovo	Anatoli Belov
FC Vest Kaliningrad	Yuri Beletskiy
FC Zenit-d St. Petersburg	none

=== Standings ===
Pos	Team	Pld	W	D	L	GF	GA	GD	Pts	Promotion or relegation
1	Kristall Smolensk (A)	24	19	2	3	57	17	+40	40	Promotion to Second League
2	Gatchina (A)	24	17	5	2	50	14	+36	39	Promotion to Second League
3	Bulat Cherepovets	24	14	3	7	37	25	+12	31	
4	Mashinostroitel Pskov	24	14	3	7	45	25	+20	31	
5	Iskra Smolensk (R)	24	12	3	9	25	19	+6	27	Relegation to Amateur Football League
6	Prometey-Dynamo St. Petersburg	24	10	5	9	32	23	+9	25	
7	Volochanin Vyshny Volochyok	24	9	7	8	26	30	−4	25	
8	Khimik Koryazhma (R)	24	9	6	9	28	28	0	24	Relegation to Amateur Football League
9	Baltika-d Kaliningrad (R)	24	6	5	13	21	45	−24	17	Relegation to Amateur Football League
10	Neftyanik Yaroslavl	24	6	4	14	19	30	−11	16	
11	Spartak Kostroma	24	5	4	15	19	41	−22	14	
12	Kraneks Ivanovo	24	4	4	16	17	53	−36	12	
13	Metallurg Pikalyovo	24	4	3	17	16	42	−26	11	

Source: RSSSF
(A) Advance to a further round; (R) Relegated

Notes:

1. FC Vest Kaliningrad were excluded from the league after playing 11 games. All the results of their games were discarded. FC Vest did not play in any national-level competitions in 1995.
2. FC Zenit-d St. Petersburg were excluded from the league after playing 10 games. All the results of their games were discarded.
3. FC Khimik Koryazhma promoted from the Amateur Football League. Khimik did not play in any national-level competitions in 1995.
4. FC Baltika-d Kaliningrad played their first professional season. Baltika-d did not play in any national-level competitions in 1995.
5. FC Neftyanik Yaroslavl and FC Metallurg Pikalyovo promoted from the Amateur Football League.

=== Top goalscorers ===
24 goals

- Valeri Solyanik (FC Kristall Smolensk)

14 goals

- Vladimir Ivanov (FC Gatchina)

11 goals

- Sergei Rybakov (FC Gatchina)

10 goals

- Pavel Barankov (FC Kristall Smolensk)
- Aleksei Gudkov (FC Kristall Smolensk)
- Vladimir Vasilyev (FC Mashinostroitel Pskov)

8 goals

- Igor Aksyonov (FC Neftyanik Yaroslavl)
- Sergei Grabazdin (FC Volochanin Vyshny Volochyok)
- Maksim Olkhovik (FC Iskra Smolensk)
- Yuri Sokolov (FC Mashinostroitel Pskov)

== Zone 5 ==
=== Overview ===
Team	Head coach
FC SKD Samara	Georgi Verbovskiy
FC Sokol-d Saratov	
FC Torpedo Pavlovo	Aleksandr Sarafannikov
FC Yudzhin Samara	Aleksandr Druganin
FC Khimik Dzerzhinsk	Mikhail Senyurin
FC Astrateks Astrakhan	Ivan Buzachkin
FC Zenit Penza	Aleksandr Komissarov
FC Kristall Sergach	Viktor Pavlyukov
FC Progress Zelenodolsk	Aleksandr Klobukov
FC Tekstilshchik Isheyevka	Aleksandr Korolyov
FC Salyut Saratov	Vladimir Khoroltsev
FC Elektron Vyatskiye Polyany	Yuri Osin
FC Spartak Tambov	Vladimir Kovylin
FC Metallurg Vyksa	Yevgeni Popov
FC Neftyanik Pokhvistnevo	Revgat Tairov
FC Khimik Uvarovo	Lev Drozdov
FC Volga Balakovo	Yevgeni Melnikov

=== Standings ===
Pos	Team	Pld	W	D	L	GF	GA	GD	Pts	Promotion or relegation
1	SKD Samara (A)	32	23	5	4	75	26	+49	51	Promotion to Second League
2	Sokol-d Saratov (R)	32	21	7	4	66	33	+33	49	Relegation to Amateur Football League
3	Torpedo Pavlovo (A)	32	20	5	7	62	28	+34	45	Promotion to Second League
4	Yudzhin Samara (R)	32	12	15	5	41	31	+10	39	Relegation to Amateur Football League
5	Khimik Dzerzhinsk	32	15	8	9	37	21	+16	38	
6	Astrateks Astrakhan	32	15	7	10	60	44	+16	37	
7	Zenit Penza	32	13	10	9	46	37	+9	36	
8	Kristall Sergach	32	15	5	12	39	33	+6	35	
9	Progress Zelenodolsk	32	11	13	8	35	32	+3	35	
10	Tekstilshchik Isheyevka	32	10	10	12	39	42	−3	30	
11	Salyut Saratov	32	9	11	12	47	51	−4	29	
12	Elektron Vyatskiye Polyany	32	10	7	15	31	42	−11	27	
13	Spartak Tambov	32	8	7	17	28	44	−16	23	
14	Metallurg Vyksa	32	7	9	16	27	47	−20	23	
15	Neftyanik Pokhvistnevo	32	4	8	20	29	62	−33	16	
16	Khimik Uvarovo (R)	32	3	10	19	22	72	−50	16	Relegation to Amateur Football League
17	Volga Balakovo	32	6	3	23	26	65	−39	15	

Source: RSSSF
(A) Advance to a further round; (R) Relegated

Notes:

1. FC Astrateks Astrakhan awarded 2 home wins.
2. FC Salyut Saratov awarded 1 home win.
3. FC Sokol-d Saratov was not promoted as it was a reserves team of FC Sokol Saratov and reserve teams were not eligible for promotion. It played their first professional season and did not play in any national-level competitions in 1995.
4. FC Zarya Krotovka moved to Samara and renamed to FC Yudzhin. Yudzhin did not play in any national-level competitions in 1995.
5. FC Kristall Sergach and FC Metallurg Vyksa played their first professional seasons.
6. FC Salyut Saratov and FC Neftyanik Pokhvistnevo promoted from the Amateur Football League.
7. FC Khimik Uvarovo did not play in any national-level competitions in 1995.

=== Top goalscorers ===
18 goals

- Dmitri Yemelyanov (FC SKD Samara)

15 goals

- Zurab Tsiklauri (FC SKD Samara)

14 goals

- Dmitri Borisko (FC SKD Samara)

13 goals

- Yuri Telyushov (FC Zenit Penza)
- Vyacheslav Ulitin (FC Zenit Penza)

12 goals

- Oleg Sofonov (FC Torpedo Pavlovo)
- Vadim Zhukovskiy (FC Yudzhin Samara)

11 goals

- Vladimir Anisimov (FC Khimik Dzerzhinsk)
- Oleg Gordeyev (FC Yudzhin Samara)
- Sergei Khokhlov (FC Salyut Saratov)
- Valeri Makarov (FC Tekstilshchik Isheyevka)

== Zone 6 ==
=== Overview ===
Team	Head coach
FC Sibir Kurgan	Vladimir Sizontov
FC Metiznik Magnitogorsk	Aleksandr Kukushkin
FC Zenit Izhevsk	Valeri Ivanov
FC Estel Ufa	Anatoli Tyryatkin
FC Uralmash-d Yekaterinburg	
FC Energiya Chaikovsky	Sergei Kleymyonov
FC Gazovik Orenburg	Viktor Dyomkin
FC Sodovik Sterlitamak	Valeri Stasevich
FC Gornyak Kachkanar	Viktor Shlyayev
FC Trubnik Kamensk-Uralsky	Anatoli Lugovykh
FC KamAZavtotsentr Naberezhnye Chelny	Nikolai Nabok
FC Dynamo Perm	Viktor Arkhapchev
FC KAMAZ-d Naberezhnye Chelny	
FC Khimik Meleuz	Viktor Nuykin

=== Standings ===
Pos	Team	Pld	W	D	L	GF	GA	GD	Pts	Promotion or relegation
1	Sibir Kurgan (A)	26	18	5	3	49	13	+36	41	Promotion to Second League
2	Metiznik Magnitogorsk	26	13	11	2	33	13	+20	37	
3	Zenit Izhevsk (A)	26	16	4	6	46	30	+16	36	Promotion to Second League
4	Estel Ufa	26	14	6	6	51	24	+27	34	
5	Uralmash-d Yekaterinburg	26	14	5	7	49	29	+20	33	
6	Energiya Chaikovsky	26	13	7	6	35	20	+15	33	
7	Gazovik Orenburg	26	13	6	7	44	33	+11	32	
8	Sodovik Sterlitamak	26	9	8	9	33	23	+10	26	
9	Gornyak Kachkanar	26	8	5	13	41	56	−15	21	
10	Trubnik Kamensk-Uralsky	26	8	5	13	34	38	−4	21	
11	KamAZavtotsentr Naberezhnye Chelny (R)	26	9	1	16	36	53	−17	19	Relegation to Amateur Football League
12	Dynamo Perm	26	5	6	15	23	32	−9	16	
13	KAMAZ-d Naberezhnye Chelny	26	3	2	21	22	69	−47	8	
14	Khimik Meleuz (R)	26	1	5	20	16	79	−63	7	Relegation to Amateur Football League

Source: RSSSF
(A) Advance to a further round; (R) Relegated

Notes:

1. FC Sibir Kurgan and FC Gornyak Kachkanar awarded 1 home win each.
2. FC KDS Samrau Ufa renamed to FC Estel.
3. FC Uralmash-d Yekaterinburg played their first professional season.
4. FC Trubnik Kamensk-Uralsky promoted from the Amateur Football League.
5. FC Khimik Meleuz promoted from the Amateur Football League. Khimik did not play in any national-level competitions in 1995.
6. FC KamAZavtotsentr Naberezhnye Chelny did not play in any national-level competitions in 1995.

=== Top goalscorers ===
19 goals

- Vladimir Naydanov (FC Sibir Kurgan)

16 goals

- Eduard Rakhmangulov (FC Estel Ufa)

15 goals

- Albert Gubaydulin (FC Sodovik Sterlitamak)
- Vitali Lazin (FC Zenit Izhevsk)

14 goals

- Aleksandr Muzyka (FC Uralmash-d Yekaterinburg)
- Sergei Sviridkin (FC Gazovik Orenburg)
- Oleg Yeryomin (FC Estel Ufa)

13 goals

- Oleg Dudlya (FC Gornyak Kachkanar)

12 goals

- Vyacheslav Suspitsin (FC Gazovik Orenburg)

10 goals

- Oleg Vladimirov (FC Energiya Chaikovsky)

== See also ==
- 1994 Russian Top League
- 1994 Russian First League
- 1994 Russian Second League
