= 1995 Russian Third League =

Russian Third League
- Season: 1995

The 1995 Russian Third League was the 2nd time competition on the fourth level of Russian football was professional. It was the first season when 3 points were awarded for a win. There were 6 zones with 98 teams starting the competition (5 were excluded before the end of the season).

== Zone 1 ==
=== Overview ===
Team	Head coach
FC Olimp Kislovodsk	Yuri Kotov
FC Angusht Malgobek	Timur Kuriyev
FC Anzhi-2 Makhachkala	Aleksandr Reshetnyak
FC Torpedo Armavir	Aleksandr Perepelkin
FC Dynamo Makhachkala	Igor Korolyov
FC Iriston Mozdok	Vitali Abayev
FC Spartak-2 Nartkala	Basir Nauruzov
FC Derbent	Vyacheslav Lyogkiy
FC Dynamo-d Stavropol	
FC Uralan-d Elista	
FC Lokomotiv Mineralnye Vody	Aleksandr Babayan
FC Druzhba-d Maykop	
FC Spartak-d Vladikavkaz	
FC Spartak Alagir	Aleksandr Lekoyev
FC Beshtau Lermontov	Konstantin Pakhomov
FC Zhemchuzhina-d Sochi	Valeri Smagin
FC Kolos-d Krasnodar	Boris Streltsov

=== Standings ===
Pos	Team	Pld	W	D	L	GF	GA	GD	Pts	Promotion or relegation
1	Olimp Kislovodsk (A)	28	21	3	4	73	17	+56	66	Promotion to Second League
2	Angusht Malgobek (A)	28	19	5	4	67	14	+53	62	Promotion to Second League
3	Anzhi-2 Makhachkala	28	16	5	7	54	31	+23	53	
4	Armavir (A)	28	15	5	8	48	22	+26	50	Promotion to Second League
5	Dynamo Makhachkala	28	15	4	9	71	33	+38	49	
6	Iriston Mozdok	28	14	4	10	47	39	+8	46	
7	Spartak-2 Nartkala	28	13	5	10	39	30	+9	44	
8	Derbent	28	12	3	13	43	44	−1	39	
9	Dynamo-d Stavropol	28	12	1	15	37	38	−1	37	
10	Uralan-d Elista	28	11	4	13	33	63	−30	37	
11	Lokomotiv Mineralnye Vody	28	11	3	14	48	58	−10	36	
12	Druzhba-d Maykop	28	9	6	13	28	42	−14	33	
13	Spartak-d Vladikavkaz (R)	28	5	4	19	27	62	−35	19	Relegation to Amateur Football League
14	Spartak Alagir (R)	28	4	4	20	22	82	−60	16	Relegation to Amateur Football League
15	Beshtau Lermontov	28	2	6	20	23	85	−62	12	

Source: RSSSF
(A) Advance to a further round; (R) Relegated

Notes:

1. FC Spartak-d Vladikavkaz were excluded from the league after playing 21 games and gaining 19 points. Their opponents were awarded a win in the remaining games. They played their first professional season. Spartak-d did not play in any national-level competitions in 1996.
2. FC Spartak Alagir were excluded from the league after playing 17 games and gaining 16 points. Their opponents were awarded a win in the remaining games. Spartak did not play in any national-level competitions in 1996.
3. FC Zhemchuzhina-d Sochi was excluded from the league after playing 13 games and gaining 18 points. All their results were discarded. They played their first professional season.
4. FC Kolos-d Krasnodar was excluded from the league after playing 11 games and gaining 13 points. All their results were discarded. They were renamed from FC Kolos-2 Krasnodar. Kolos-d did not play in any national-level competitions in 1996.
5. FC Anzhi-2 Makhachkala was not promoted as reserve teams were not eligible for promotion.
6. FC Ingushetiya Nazran moved to Malgobek and was renamed to FC Angusht.
7. FC Argo Kaspiysk moved to Makhachkala and was renamed to FC Anzhi-2.
8. FC Spartak-2 Nartkala and FC Druzhba-d Maykop played their first professional season.
9. FC Derbent did not play professionally in 1994.

=== Top goalscorers ===
21 goals

- Isa Markhiyev (FC Angusht Malgobek)

20 goals

- Alisher Gippot (FC Olimp Kislovodsk)

18 goals

- Budun Budunov (FC Anzhi-2 Makhachkala)

15 goals

- Yuri Takliyev (FC Iriston Mozdok)

14 goals

- Oleg Kamyshov (FC Olimp Kislovodsk)
- Kyamran Nurakhmedov (FC Dynamo Makhachkala)

13 goals

- Ruslan Musayev (FC Angusht Malgobek)

12 goals

- Yaroslav Kazberov (FC Angusht Malgobek)
- (Azerbaijan) Narvik Sirkhayev (FC Dynamo Makhachkala)

11 goals

- Andranik Babayan (FC Lokomotiv Mineralnye Vody)

== Zone 2 ==
=== Overview ===
Team	Head coach
FC Avangard Kursk	Aleksandr Galkin
FC Lokomotiv Liski	Yuri Rybnikov
FC Volgodonsk	Valeri Zubakov
FC Kuban Slavyansk-na-Kubani	Nikolai Smirnov
FC Istochnik Rostov-on-Don	Kamil Akchurin
FC Niva Slavyansk-na-Kubani	Vladimir Fofanov
FC Luch Tula	Aleksandr Yurchikov
FC Lokomotiv Yelets	Yuri Raznov
FC Metallurg Krasny Sulin	Viktor Shchirov
FC Oryol	Vladimir Brykin
FC Shakhtyor Shakhty	Valeri Volodin
FC APK Morozovsk	Vasili Kravchenko
FC Rotor-d Volgograd	Yuri Marushkin
FC Dynamo Mikhaylovka	Sergei Popkov
FC Spartak-Bratskiy Yuzhny	Sergei Antonkin
FC Ritm Alekseyevka	Aleksandr Petrenko

=== Standings ===
Pos	Team	Pld	W	D	L	GF	GA	GD	Pts	Promotion or relegation
1	Avangard Kursk (A)	30	21	2	7	52	30	+22	65	Promotion to Second League
2	Lokomotiv Liski (A)	30	19	6	5	62	32	+30	63	Promotion to Second League
3	Volgodonsk (A)	30	19	4	7	62	19	+43	61	Promotion to Second League
4	Kuban Slavyansk-na-Kubani	30	19	4	7	59	37	+22	61	
5	Istochnik Rostov-on-Don	30	17	7	6	50	24	+26	58	
6	Niva Slavyansk-na-Kubani	30	14	6	10	45	38	+7	48	
7	Luch Tula	30	13	6	11	40	37	+3	45	
8	Lokomotiv Yelets	30	13	5	12	34	29	+5	44	
9	Metallurg Krasny Sulin	30	13	5	12	46	37	+9	44	
10	Oryol	30	12	7	11	49	42	+7	43	
11	Shakhtyor Shakhty	30	8	5	17	38	40	−2	29	
12	APK Morozovsk	30	7	7	16	28	56	−28	28	
13	Rotor-d Volgograd	30	8	2	20	52	69	−17	26	
14	Dynamo Mikhaylovka	30	6	8	16	33	58	−25	26	
15	Spartak-Bratskiy Yuzhny	30	7	2	21	30	70	−40	23	
16	Ritm Alekseyevka (R)	30	5	2	23	17	79	−62	17	Relegation to Amateur Football League

Source: RSSSF
(A) Advance to a further round; (R) Relegated

Notes:

1. FC Kuban Slavyansk-na-Kubani awarded 1 home win.
2. FC Spartak-Bratskiy Yuzhny awarded 1 home loss.
3. FC Lokomotiv Liski, FC APK Morozovsk and FC Ritm Alekseyevka promoted from the Amateur Football League.
4. FC Atommash Volgodonsk renamed to FC Volgodonsk.
5. FC Luch Tula and FC Dynamo Mykhaylovka played their first professional season.
6. FC Lokomotiv Yelets promoted from the Amateur Football League, where they played in 1994 as FC Torpedo Yelets.
7. FC Ritm Alekseyevka did not play in any national-level competitions in 1996.

=== Top goalscorers ===
21 goals

- Vagif Shirinov (FC Kuban Slavyansk-na-Kubani)

20 goals

- Vladimir Kharin (FC Lokomotiv Liski)

18 goals

- German Telesh (FC Luch Tula)

15 goals

- Aleksandr Glazkov (FC Oryol)

14 goals

- Konstantin Boyko (FC Istochnik Rostov-on-Don)
- Aleksandr Korneyev (FC Dynamo Mikhaylovka)

12 goals

- Vladimir Grishchenko (FC Niva Slavyansk-na-Kubani)
- Nikolai Kolchugin (FC Rotor-d Volgograd)

11 goals

- Valentin Shashkov (FC Shakhtyor Shakhty)
- Yuri Sirota (FC Volgodonsk)

== Zone 3 ==
=== Overview ===
Team	Head coach
FC Don Novomoskovsk	Leonid Lipovoy
FC Spartak-d Moscow	Viktor Zernov
FC Kosmos Dolgoprudny	Aleksandr Logunov
FC Moskovskiy-Selyatino Selyatino	Leonid Nazarenko
FC Dynamo-d Moscow	Nikolai Gontar
FC Mosenergo Moscow	Valentin Sysoyev
FC Titan Reutov	Aleksei Belenkov
FC Avtomobilist Noginsk	Vladimir Petrov
PFC CSKA-d Moscow	Yuri Adzhem
FC Torgmash Lyubertsy	Anatoli Leshchenkov
FC Torpedo-d Moscow	Sergei Petrenko
FC Torpedo Mytishchi	Yuri Naydyonov / Valeri Kholomin
FC Fabus Bronnitsy	Vladimir Sautin
FC Mashinostroitel Sergiyev Posad	Andrei Leksakov
FC Monolit Moscow	Yuri Vereykin
FC Oka Kolomna	Aleksandr Borisenkov
FC Krasnogvardeyets Moscow	Mikhail Khristich
FC Dynamo-2 Moscow	Yevgeni Baykov
FC Chertanovo Moscow	Mikhail Karatayev
FC TRASKO Moscow	Leonid Pribylovskiy
FC Lokomotiv-d Moscow	Vladimir Korotkov
FC Smena Moscow	
FC Asmaral-d Moscow	

=== Standings ===
Pos	Team	Pld	W	D	L	GF	GA	GD	Pts	Promotion or relegation
1	Don Novomoskovsk (A)	44	36	3	5	84	19	+65	111	Promotion to Second League
2	Spartak-d Moscow	44	33	8	3	139	32	+107	107	
3	Kosmos Dolgoprudny (A)	44	26	12	6	68	28	+40	90	Promotion to Second League
4	Moskovskiy-Selyatino Selyatino (A)	44	27	8	9	114	51	+63	89	Promotion to Second League
5	Dynamo-d Moscow	44	27	5	12	102	56	+46	86	
6	Mosenergo Moscow	44	25	9	10	78	46	+32	84	
7	Titan Reutov	44	22	12	10	67	36	+31	78	
8	Avtomobilist Noginsk	44	22	9	13	61	39	+22	75	
9	CSKA-d Moscow	44	21	10	13	71	55	+16	73	
10	Torgmash Lyubertsy	44	20	10	14	66	48	+18	70	
11	Torpedo-d Moscow	44	18	10	16	68	50	+18	64	
12	Torpedo Mytishchi (R)	44	14	15	15	55	51	+4	57	Relegation to Amateur Football League
13	Fabus Bronnitsy	44	15	8	21	49	62	−13	53	
14	Mashinostroitel Sergiyev Posad	44	12	15	17	42	61	−19	51	
15	Monolit Moscow	44	11	14	19	46	53	−7	47	
16	Oka Kolomna	44	10	16	18	27	54	−27	46	
17	Krasnogvardeyets Moscow	44	12	6	26	56	103	−47	42	
18	Dynamo-2 Moscow	44	12	5	27	47	83	−36	41	
19	Chertanovo Moscow	44	9	13	22	47	70	−23	40	
20	TRASKO Moscow	44	9	10	25	38	101	−63	37	
21	Lokomotiv-d Moscow	44	8	10	26	37	78	−41	34	
22	Smena Moscow	44	6	10	28	22	86	−64	28	
23	Asmaral-d Moscow (R)	44	0	4	40	16	138	−122	4	Relegation to Amateur Football League

Source: RSSSF
(A) Advance to a further round; (R) Relegated

Notes:

1. FC Asmaral-d Moscow was excluded from the league after playing 23 games and gaining 4 points. Their opponents were awarded a win in the remaining games. Asmaral-d did not play in any national-level competitions in 1996.
2. PFC CSKA-d Moscow and FC Torpedo-d Moscow awarded 1 home loss each.
3. FC Spartak-d Moscow was not promoted as reserves teams were not eligible for promotion.
4. FC Tekhinvest-M Moskovskiy moved to Selyatino and renamed to FC Moskovskiy-Selyatino.
5. FC Torpedo-MKB Mytishchi renamed to FC Torpedo. Torpedo did not play in any national-level competitions in 1996.
6. FC Fabus Bronnitsy played their first professional season.
7. FC Rossiya Moscow renamed to FC Monolit.
8. FC Krasnogvardeyets Moscow promoted from the Amateur Football League.
9. FC Smena Moscow promoted from the Amateur Football League, where they played in 1994 as FC Smena-Ronika Moscow.

=== Top goalscorers ===
35 goals

- Aleksei Kutsenko (FC Dynamo-d Moscow)

32 goals

- Aleksei Snigiryov (FC Moskovskiy-Selyatino Selyatino)

27 goals

- Aleksandr Shirko (FC Spartak-d Moscow)

21 goals

- Yuri Moiseyev (FC Don Novomoskovsk)

20 goals

- (Armenia) Andrey Movsisyan (FC Spartak-d Moscow)

19 goals

- Dmitri Chesnokov (FC Titan Reutov)

18 goals

- Anatoli Sigachyov (FC Don Novomoskovsk)

17 goals

- Andrei Afanasyev (FC Mosenergo Moscow)
- Konstantin Golovskoy (FC Spartak-d Moscow)
- Aleksei Kryuchkov (FC Titan Reutov)
- Andrei Meshchaninov (FC Kosmos Dolgoprudny)

== Zone 4 ==
=== Overview ===
Team	Head coach
FC Turbostroitel Kaluga	Georgi Kolmogorov
FC Dynamo St. Petersburg	Aleksandr Fyodorov
FC Neftyanik Yaroslavl	Valentin Volkov
FC Mashinostroitel Pskov	Sergei Markelov
FC Dynamo Bryansk	Viktor Zimin
FC Bulat Cherepovets	Aleksandr Sokolov
FC Vympel Rybinsk	Boris Belyakov
FC Spartak Kostroma	Valeri Volchanovskiy
FC Kristall Dyatkovo	Aleksei Varnavskiy
FC Volochanin Vyshny Volochyok	Igor Bychkov
FC Metallurg Pikalyovo	Anatoli Belov
FC Zenit-d St. Petersburg	
FC Kraneks Ivanovo	

=== Standings ===
Pos	Team	Pld	W	D	L	GF	GA	GD	Pts	Promotion or relegation
1	Turbostroitel Kaluga (A)	24	16	5	3	34	12	+22	53	Promotion to Second League
2	Dynamo St. Petersburg (A)	24	15	4	5	39	17	+22	49	Promotion to Second League
3	Neftyanik Yaroslavl	24	12	6	6	32	17	+15	42	
4	Mashinostroitel Pskov	24	11	9	4	30	18	+12	42	
5	Dynamo Bryansk	23	10	8	5	32	16	+16	38	
6	Bulat Cherepovets	24	10	5	9	26	27	−1	35	
7	Vympel Rybinsk (R)	24	9	6	9	24	23	+1	33	Relegation to Amateur Football League
8	Spartak Kostroma	24	7	7	10	26	30	−4	28	
9	Kristall Dyatkovo	24	8	3	13	21	41	−20	27	
10	Volochanin Vyshny Volochyok	24	7	4	13	22	34	−12	25	
11	Metallurg Pikalyovo (R)	24	4	9	11	21	37	−16	21	Relegation to Amateur Football League
12	Zenit-d St. Petersburg	24	6	1	17	28	38	−10	19	
13	Kraneks Ivanovo	24	3	7	14	14	39	−25	16	

Source: RSSSF
(A) Advance to a further round; (R) Relegated

Notes:

1. FC Prometey-Dynamo St. Petersburg renamed to FC Dynamo.
2. FC Vympel Rybinsk did not play in any national-level competitions in 1996.

=== Top goalscorers ===
11 goals

- Kamil Ferkhanov (FC Turbostroitel Kaluga)

9 goals

- Sergei Grabazdin (FC Volochanin Vyshny Volochyok)
- Aleksandr Gusev (FC Metallurg Pikalyovo)
- Vadim Kovalyov (FC Kristall Dyatkovo)

8 goals

- Valeri Alistarov (FC Turbostroitel Kaluga)
- Aleksei Volkhonskiy (FC Spartak Kostroma)

7 goals

- Nikolai Churakov (FC Dynamo St. Petersburg)
- Sergei Subratov (FC Dynamo Bryansk)
- Mikhail Zinikov (FC Dynamo St. Petersburg)

6 goals

- Igor Aksyonov (FC Neftyanik Yaroslavl)
- Aleksei Chikin (FC Spartak Kostroma)
- Aleksandr Gultyayev (FC Mashinostroitel Pskov)
- Sergei Kubryakov (FC Mashinostroitel Pskov)
- Valeri Lenivkov (FC Vympel Rybinsk)

== Zone 5 ==
=== Overview ===
Team	Head coach
FC Zenit Penza	Aleksandr Komissarov
FC Zavodchanin Saratov	Anatoli Smal
FC Khimik Dzerzhinsk	Mikhail Senyurin
FC Spartak Tambov	Vladimir Kovylin
FC Astrateks Astrakhan	Boris Bashkin
FC Kristall Sergach	Viktor Pavlyukov
FC Planeta Bugulma	German Bobek
FC Volga Ulyanovsk	Sergei Sedyshev
FC Volga Balakovo	Aleksandr Krokhin
FC Druzhba Yoshkar-Ola	Radik Gadeyev
FC Salyut Saratov	Yuri Mashlikovskiy
FC Neftyanik Pokhvistnevo	
FC Progress Zelenodolsk	Aleksandr Klobukov
FC Metallurg Vyksa	Konstantin Malinin
FC Lada-d Togliatti	Valeri Petruk

=== Standings ===
Pos	Team	Pld	W	D	L	GF	GA	GD	Pts	Promotion or relegation
1	Zenit Penza (A)	28	20	4	4	54	17	+37	64	Promotion to Second League
2	Zavodchanin Saratov (A)	28	19	2	7	67	28	+39	59	Promotion to Second League
3	Khimik Dzerzhinsk	28	17	6	5	55	27	+28	57	
4	Spartak Tambov	28	13	6	9	42	32	+10	45	
5	Astrateks Astrakhan	28	12	6	10	35	40	−5	42	
6	Kristall Sergach	28	11	8	9	36	30	+6	41	
7	Planeta Bugulma	28	10	7	11	27	37	−10	37	
8	Volga Ulyanovsk	28	9	7	12	33	35	−2	34	
9	Volga Balakovo	28	8	8	12	25	37	−12	32	
10	Druzhba Yoshkar-Ola	28	7	10	11	27	34	−7	31	
11	Salyut Saratov	28	9	3	16	28	49	−21	30	
12	Neftyanik Pokhvistnevo	28	7	8	13	20	31	−11	29	
13	Progress Zelenodolsk	28	7	8	13	26	41	−15	29	
14	Metallurg Vyksa	28	7	7	14	28	42	−14	28	
15	Lada-d Togliatti (R)	28	5	8	15	28	51	−23	23	Relegation to Amateur Football League

Source: RSSSF
(A) Advance to a further round; (R) Relegated

Notes:

1. FC Lada-d Togliatti was excluded from the league after playing 25 games. Opponents were awarded wins in the remaining games. That was their first professional season and they did not play in any national-level competitions in 1996.
2. FC Zavodchanin Saratov played their first professional season.
3. FC Planeta Bugulma promoted from the Amateur Football League.
4. FC Tekstilshchik Isheyevka moved to Ulyanovsk and renamed FC Volga.

=== Top goalscorers ===
25 goals

- Vadim Tyurin (FC Zavodchanin Saratov)

20 goals

- Vladimir Anisimov (FC Khimik Dzerzhinsk)

14 goals

- Vladimir Mishin (FC Volga Ulyanovsk)

11 goals

- Viktor Zorkin (FC Khimik Dzerzhinsk)

10 goals

- Sergei Glazunov (FC Salyut Saratov)

9 goals

- (Uzbekistan) Ruslan Adzhiyev (FC Lada-d Togliatti)
- Eduard Bazarov (FC Volga Balakovo)
- Anatoli Lychagov (FC Kristall Sergach)
- Sergei Panov (FC Druzhba Yoshkar-Ola)
- Yuri Telyushov (FC Zenit Penza)
- Aleksei Tilman (FC Astrateks Astrakhan)
- Aleksei Tokarev (FC Zavodchanin Saratov)
- Oleg Zykov (FC Zavodchanin Saratov)

== Zone 6 ==
=== Overview ===
Team	Head coach
FC Energiya Chaikovsky	Sergei Kleymyonov
FC Amkar Perm	Sergei Oborin
FC Sodovik Sterlitamak	Sergei Maksimov
FC Metiznik Magnitogorsk	Aleksandr Kukushkin
FC Gornyak-Vanadiy Kachkanar	Viktor Shlyayev
FC Elektron Vyatskiye Polyany	Yuri Osin
FC Gornyak Kushva	Viktor Konshin
FC Trubnik Kamensk-Uralsky	Anatoli Lugovykh
FC Agidel Ufa	Anatoli Tyryatkin
FC Gazovik Orenburg	Viktor Dyomkin
FC Uralmash-d Yekaterinburg	Viktor Yerokhin
FC Dynamo-Gazovik-d Tyumen	Viktor Ivanov
FC Dynamo Perm	Anatoli Timofeyev
FC KAMAZ-Chally-d Naberezhnye Chelny	

=== Standings ===
Pos	Team	Pld	W	D	L	GF	GA	GD	Pts	Promotion or relegation
1	Energiya Chaikovsky (A)	26	18	4	4	48	21	+27	58	Promotion to Second League
2	Amkar Perm (A)	26	17	5	4	50	15	+35	56	
3	Sodovik Sterlitamak	26	16	3	7	53	31	+22	51	
4	Metiznik Magnitogorsk	26	15	4	7	53	36	+17	49	
5	Gornyak-Vanadiy Kachkanar	26	15	2	9	32	22	+10	47	
6	Elektron Vyatskiye Polyany	26	10	10	6	34	20	+14	40	
7	Gornyak Kushva	26	11	4	11	29	39	−10	37	
8	Trubnik Kamensk-Uralsky	26	11	2	13	34	47	−13	35	
9	Agidel Ufa (R)	26	10	5	11	36	33	+3	35	Relegation to Amateur Football League
10	Gazovik Orenburg	26	8	5	13	30	42	−12	29	
11	Uralmash-d Yekaterinburg	26	7	5	14	36	48	−12	26	
12	Dynamo-Gazovik-d Tyumen	26	8	1	17	25	37	−12	25	
13	Dynamo Perm	26	6	5	15	22	35	−13	23	
14	KAMAZ-Chally-d Naberezhnye Chelny	26	2	1	23	17	73	−56	7	

Source: RSSSF
(A) Advance to a further round; (R) Relegated

Notes:

1. FC Sodovik Sterlitamak awarded 1 home win.
2. FC Dynamo Perm and FC KamAZ-Chally-d Naberezhnye Chelny awarded 1 home loss.
3. FC Amkar Perm and FC Dynamo-Gazovik-d Tyumen played their first professional season.
4. FC Gornyak Kachkanar renamed to FC Gornyak-Vanadiy.
5. FC Gornyak Kushva promoted from the Amateur Football League.
6. FC Estel Ufa renamed to FC Agidel. Agidel did not play in any national-level competitions in 1996.
7. FC KAMAZ-d Naberezhnye Chelny renamed to FC KAMAZ-Chally-d Naberezhnye Chelny.

=== Top goalscorers ===
12 goals

- Aleksandr Feofanov (FC Sodovik Sterlitamak)
- Vladimir Titov (FC Trubnik Kamensk-Uralsky)

11 goals

- Aleksei Kolotov (FC Elektron Vyatskiye Polyany)

10 goals

- Vyacheslav Ivanov (FC Agidel Ufa)
- Denis Malyavkin (FC Metiznik Magnitogorsk)
- Andrei Shabanov (FC Uralmash-d Yekaterinburg)
- Arslon Talipov (FC Amkar Perm)

9 goals

- Aleksandr Chernykh (FC Gornyak-Vanadiy Kachkanar)

8 goals

- Sergei Chebanov (FC Amkar Perm)
- Sergei Cherkasov (FC Metiznik Magnitogorsk)
- Nazar Polishchuk (FC Energiya Chaikovsky)
- Igor Shmidt (FC Gornyak-Vanadiy Kachkanar)
- Sergei Sidorov (FC Sodovik Sterlitamak)
- Robert Zinnyatulov (FC Sodovik Sterlitamak)
- Konstantin Zyryanov (FC Amkar Perm)

== See also ==
- 1995 Russian Top League
- 1995 Russian First League
- 1995 Russian Second League
