= Gornyak =

Gornyak may refer to:

== Places ==
- Gornyak, Altai Krai, Russia
- Gornyak (inhabited locality), several places in Russia

== Sports ==
- FC Gornyak, a soccer team from Aktobe Province, Kazakhstan
- FC Gornyak Gramoteino, a soccer team from Kemerovo Oblast, Russia
- FC Gornyak Kachkanar, a soccer team from Sverdlovsk Oblast, Russia
- FC Gornyak Kushva (1992–1997), a defunct soccer team from Sverdlovsk Oblast, Russia
- FC Gornyak Uchaly, a soccer team from the Republic of Bashkortostan, Russia
- Gornyak Rudny, an ice hockey team from Kazakhstan

== See also ==
- Gornik (disambiguation)
- Hirnyk (disambiguation)
