= Jord =

Jord may refer to:

- Jörð (Old Norse: Jǫrð, meaning "soil, earth, dirt"), a Norse goddess
- Jord International, Australian custom manufacturing company
- Jord Corona, planet Venus; a volcanic dome; see List of coronae on Venus
- Mount Jord, Asgard Range, Victorialand, Antarctica; a mountain
- Jord Samolesky, Canadian musician, drummer for the Canadian punk band Propagandhi
- A diminutive of the name Jordan (name)

== See also ==
- Gord (disambiguation)
- Gordon (disambiguation)
- Jordan (disambiguation)
- Lajord
