= Gorb =

Gorb is a surname. Notable people with the surname include:

- Sergei Gorb (born 1954), Russian footballer and coach
- Tatiana Gorb (1935–2013), Russian Soviet artist, daughter of Vladimir
- Vladimir Gorb (1903–1988), Russian Soviet artist

== See also ==
- Gord (given name)
- Gore (surname)
