= Maksim Sukrutin =

Russian footballer

Personal information
- Full name: Maksim Aleksandrovich Sukrutin
- Date of birth: 29 September 1987 (age 39)
- Height: 1.80 m (5 ft 11 in)
- Position: Midfielder

Senior career*
Years	Team	Apps	(Gls)
2006	FC Salyut Saratov (amateur)		
2006–2007	FC Lada Togliatti	7	(0)
2007–2009	FC Sokol-Saratov	37	(2)
2010	FC Sokol Saratov	22	(0)
2012–2013	FC Sever Murmansk	32	(2)
- * Club domestic league appearances and goals

Maksim Aleksandrovich Sukrutin (Russian: Максим Александрович Сукрутин; born 29 September 1987) is a former Russian professional football player.

== Club career ==
He played in the Russian Football National League for FC Lada Togliatti in 2006.
