= Dmitri Zakharov =

Russian footballer

Personal information
- Full name: Dmitri Borisovich Zakharov
- Date of birth: 29 January 1971 (age 55)
- Place of birth: Revda, Russian SFSR
- Height: 1.78 m (5 ft 10 in)
- Positions: Forward; midfielder

Youth career
- FC Uralmash Sverdlovsk

Senior career*
Years	Team	Apps	(Gls)
1989	FC Uralmash Sverdlovsk	6	(0)
1990–1991	FC Metallurg Revda		
1992	FC Gornyak Kushva (amateur)		
1992–1993	FC Gornyak Kachkanar	50	(19)
1994–1995	FC Uralets Nizhny Tagil	58	(13)
1996	FC Gornyak Kachkanar	11	(9)
1996	FC Uralmash Yekaterinburg	10	(0)
1996	→ FC Uralmash-d Yekaterinburg (loan)	1	(0)
1997	FC Irtysh Tobolsk	23	(7)
1998	FC Gornyak Kachkanar (amateur)		
1999–2004	FC Uralets Nizhny Tagil	107	(15)
- * Club domestic league appearances and goals

Dmitri Borisovich Zakharov (Russian: Дмитрий Борисович Захаров; born 29 January 1971 in Revda) is a former Russian football player.
