= Vadim Tyurin =

Russian footballer and coach

Personal information
- Full name: Vadim Vyacheslavovich Tyurin
- Date of birth: 13 April 1971 (age 55)
- Place of birth: Saratov, Russian SFSR
- Height: 1.74 m (5 ft 8 1/2 in)
- Position: Striker

Youth career
- SEPO Saratov

Senior career*
Years	Team	Apps	(Gls)
1988–1989	FC Sokol Saratov	5	(1)
1990	PFC CSKA Moscow	0	(0)
1990	→ PFC CSKA-2 Moscow	6	(0)
1990–1991	FC SKA Rostov-on-Don	26	(6)
1992	FC Sokol Saratov	10	(2)
1994	FC Sokol Saratov	0	(0)
1994	→ FC Sokol-d Saratov	15	(4)
1995–1996	FC Zavodchanin Saratov	52	(26)
1997	FC SKA Rostov-on-Don	14	(1)
1998–2001	FC Salyut Saratov	25	(4)

Managerial career
- 2008: FC Salyut Saratov (assistant)
- * Club domestic league appearances and goals

Vadim Vyacheslavovich Tyurin (Russian: Вадим Вячеславович Тюрин; born 13 April 1971) is a Russian professional football coach and a former player.

== Club career ==
He made his debut for PFC CSKA Moscow on 16 June 1990 in a Federation Cup game against FC Rotor Volgograd.

He played in the Russian Football National League for FC Sokol Saratov in 1992.

== Honours ==
- Russian Third League Zone 5 top scorer: 1995 (25 goals).
