= Vladimir Titov =

Vladimir Titov (Russian: Владимир Титов) may refer to the following notable people:

- Vladimir Titov (cosmonaut) (born 1947), Russian cosmonaut
- Vladimir Titov (diplomat) (1964-2025), Russian diplomat
- Vladimir Titov (footballer) (born 1967), Russian association football midfielder
- Vladimir Titov (writer) (also known as Tit Kosmokratov, 1807–1891), Russian writer and statesman
