= Ilya Kaplan =

Russian footballer

Personal information
- Full name: Ilya Yakovlevich Kaplan
- Date of birth: 27 June 1986 (age 40)
- Height: 1.70 m (5 ft 7 in)
- Position: Midfielder

Youth career
- FC Arsenal Tula

Senior career*
Years	Team	Apps	(Gls)
2003	FC Dynamo Tula	8	(0)
2004–2006	FC Arsenal Tula	40	(9)
2007	Jūrmala	11	(1)
2008	FC Arsenal Tula (D4)		
2008	FC Don Novomoskovsk (D4)		
2009	FC Arsenal Tula (D4)		
2010	FC Istra	30	(6)
2011	FC Mostovik-Primorye Ussuriysk	15	(3)
- * Club domestic league appearances and goals

Ilya Yakovlevich Kaplan (Russian: Илья Яковлевич Каплан; born 27 June 1986) is a former Russian professional football player.

== Club career ==
He played one season in the Russian Football National League for FC Arsenal Tula in 2004.
