= Boris Sinitsyn =

Russian footballer (born 1953)

Personal information
- Full name: Boris Alekseyevich Sinitsyn
- Date of birth: August 11, 1953 (age 73)
- Height: 1.77 m (5 ft 9 1/2 in)
- Position: Defender

Team information
- Current team: FC Sakhalin Yuzhno-Sakhalinsk (administrator)

Senior career*
Years	Team	Apps	(Gls)
1975–1976	FC Dynamo Leningrad		
1977	FC SKA Rostov-on-Don	5	(0)
1980–1981	FC Dynamo Stavropol	49	(0)
1983–1984	FC Sever Murmansk	45	(0)

Managerial career
- 1993: FC Obninsk (assistant)
- 1994: FC Obninsk
- 1995: PFC Spartak Nalchik
- 1996: FC Avangard-Kolos Taganrog
- 1998: FC Zvezda Irkutsk
- 1998: FC Neftekhimik Nizhnekamsk
- 2000: FK Ventspils
- 2001–2003: FC Sodovik Sterlitamak
- 2003: FC Lukoil Chelyabinsk
- 2004: FC Lukoil Chelyabinsk (director of sports)
- 2005: FC Zenit Chelyabinsk (senior administrator)
- 2006: FC Gazovik Orenburg
- 2007: FC Torpedo Volzhsky
- 2007–2008: FC Sochi-04
- 2010: FC Bashinformsvyaz-Dynamo Ufa
- 2012–: FC Sakhalin Yuzhno-Sakhalinsk (administrator)
- * Club domestic league appearances and goals

Boris Alekseyevich Sinitsyn (Russian: Борис Алексеевич Синицын; born August 11, 1953) is a Russian professional football coach and a former player. He works as an administrator with FC Sakhalin Yuzhno-Sakhalinsk.
