= Hirnyk =

Hirnyk (Ukrainian: Гірник) means Miner in Ukrainian and can refer to:

== Populated places ==
- Hirnyk, Donetsk Oblast, a city in Donetsk Oblast of eastern Ukraine
- Hirnyk, Lviv Oblast, a town in Lviv Oblast of western Ukraine
- Hirnyk, Luhansk Oblast, a town in Luhansk Oblast of eastern Ukraine

== Sports teams ==
- FC Hirnyk Kryvyi Rih
- FC Hirnyk-Sport Komsomolsk

== Surname ==
- Hirnyk (surname)

== See also ==
- Gornik (disambiguation)
- Gornyak (disambiguation)
