= Degtyarev =

Degtyaryov or Degtyarev (masculine, Russian: Дегтярёв), or Degtyaryova (feminine, Russian: Дегтярёва):

- David Degtyarev (born 1996), Kazakh Paralympic powerlifter
- Grigoriy Degtyaryov (1958–2011), Russian decathlete
- Igor Degtyaryov (b. 1976), Russian footballer
- Stepan Degtyarev (1766–1813), Russian composer
- Vasily Degtyarev (1880–1949), Russian weapons designer
- Mikhail Degtyarev (b. 1981), Russian politician
- Tamara Degtyaryova (1944–2018), Russian actress
