= Panov =

Panov (masculine; Пано́в) or Panova (feminine; Пано́ва) is a Slavic surname, most common in Russia, Bulgaria and North Macedonia. Notable people with the surname include:

- Aleksandr Panov (diplomat) (born 1944), Russian diplomat
- Aleksandr Panov (handballer) (born 1946), Russian handball player
- Aleksandr Panov (footballer) (born 1975), Russian football player
- Alexandra Panova (born 1989), Russian tennis player
- Alina Panova, American film and stage costume designer and producer
- Angelko Panov (born 1979), Macedonian football player
- Anton Panov (1906–1967), Macedonian writer
- Asparuh Panov, Bulgarian politician
- Bianka Panova (born 1970), Bulgarian individual rhythmic gymnast
- Dimitar Panov (1902–1985), Bulgarian film and theater actor and director
- Evgeny N. Panov (1936–2024), Soviet and Russian zoologist and ethologist
- Greta Panova (born 1983), Bulgarian-American mathematician
- Konstantin Panov, Russian ice hockey player
- Mikhail Panov (1901–1979), Soviet Army general
- Olga Panova (born 1987), Russian tennis player
- Pavel Panov (1950–2018), Bulgarian football player and coach
- Sergei Panov (disambiguation) – multiple people
- Tatiana Panova (born 1976), Russian tennis player
- Tsvetomir Panov (born 1989), Bulgarian football player
- Vadim Panov, Russian fantasy and science fiction writer
- Valery Panov (1938–2025), Russian-born Israeli dancer and choreographer
- Vasily Panov (1906–1973), Soviet chess player
- Vera Panova (1905–1973), Soviet Russian writer
- Vitali Panov (born 1979), Russian football player and coach
- Yelena Panova (disambiguation) – multiple people
