= Sergei Alyapkin =

Russian footballer

Personal information
- Full name: Sergei Ivanovich Alyapkin
- Date of birth: 7 June 1972 (age 54)
- Place of birth: Kamensk-Uralsky, Russian SFSR
- Height: 1.88 m (6 ft 2 in)
- Position: Goalkeeper

Senior career*
Years	Team	Apps	(Gls)
1990–1991	Uralmash Sverdlovsk	0	(0)
1992–1993	Gornyak Kachkanar	58	(0)
1993–2003	Ural Yekaterinburg	184	(0)

Managerial career
- 2004–2005: Ural Yekaterinburg (assistant)
- 2008: Ural Yekaterinburg (GK coach)
- 2009–2015: Ural Yekaterinburg (assistant)
- 2015–2020: Ural Yekaterinburg (U-21 assistant)
- * Club domestic league appearances and goals

Sergei Ivanovich Alyapkin (Russian: Серге́й Иванович Аляпкин; born 7 June 1972 in Kamensk-Uralsky) is a Russian professional football coach and a former player.

Alyapkin played in the Russian Premier League with FC Uralmash Yekaterinburg.
