= Viktor Zimin =

Viktor Zimin may refer to:

- Viktor Zimin (politician) (1962–2020), Russian politician, Head of the Republic of Khakassia
- Viktor Zimin (football manager) (born 1950), Russian football coach
