= Sergei Grunichev =

Former Russian footballer, born 1963

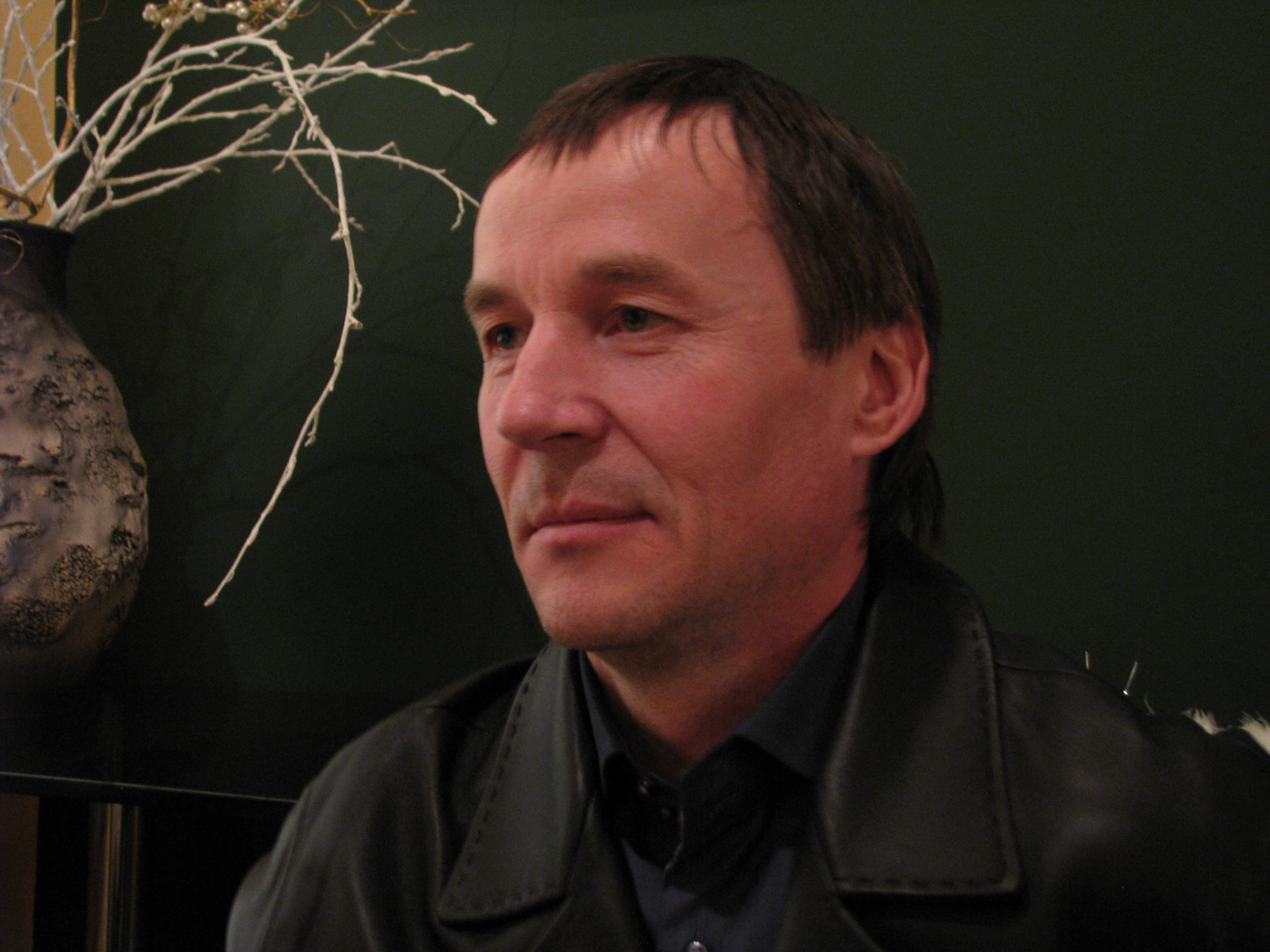
- Grunichev in 2012

Personal information
- Full name: Sergei Vyacheslavovich Grunichev
- Date of birth: 9 March 1963 (age 63)
- Place of birth: Stavropol, Russian SFSR
- Height: 1.76 m (5 ft 9 1/2 in)
- Positions: Forward; midfielder

Youth career
- FC Dynamo Stavropol

Senior career*
Years	Team	Apps	(Gls)
1980–1988	FC Dynamo Stavropol	233	(60)
1988	FC Spartak Moscow	4	(0)
1989–1991	FC Dynamo Stavropol	88	(18)
1992	did not play		
1993–1995	FC Dynamo Stavropol	38	(4)
1994–1995	→ FC Dynamo-d Stavropol (loans)	2	(1)
1995	FC Venets Gulkevichi	17	(3)
1996	FC Kolos Taganrog	17	(6)
1997	FC Vityaz Shpakovskoye		
- * Club domestic league appearances and goals

Sergei Vyacheslavovich Grunichev (Russian: Сергей Вячеславович Груничев; born 9 March 1963 in Stavropol) is a former Russian football player.
