= Viktor Ivanov (disambiguation) =

Viktor Ivanov (born 1950) is a Russian politician and businessman.

Viktor Ivanov may also refer to:

- Viktor Ivanov (stunt coordinator), Russian film director and stunt coordinator
- Viktor Ivanov (film director) (1909-1981), Ukrainian film director
- Viktor Ivanov (boxer) (born 1962), Ukrainian boxer
- Viktor Ivanov (rower) (born 1930), Soviet rower
- Viktor Ivanov (footballer) (born 1960), Soviet footballer
- Victor Ivanov (water polo) (born 1984), Russian water polo player
- Viktor Semyonovich Ivanov (1909–1968), Soviet poster artist
