= Dmitri Ustyuzhaninov =

Russian footballer

Personal information
- Full name: Dmitri Yuryevich Ustyuzhaninov
- Date of birth: 7 February 1962 (age 64)
- Place of birth: Nizhny Tagil, Russian SFSR
- Height: 1.87 m (6 ft 1 1/2 in)
- Position: Defender

Youth career
- FC Uralets Nizhny Tagil

Senior career*
Years	Team	Apps	(Gls)
1980–1983	FC Uralets Nizhny Tagil	67	(5)
1984–1989	FC Uralmash Sverdlovsk	194	(4)
1990	SFC Drohobych	12	(0)
1990–1992	FC Uralmash Yekaterinburg	83	(1)
1993	FC Gornyak Kushva (amateur)		
- * Club domestic league appearances and goals

Dmitri Yuryevich Ustyuzhaninov (Russian: Дмитрий Юрьевич Устюжанинов; born 7 February 1962 in Nizhny Tagil) is a former Russian football player.
