= Shirinov =

Shirinov (Russian: Ширинов) is a masculine surname of Azerbaijani origin, its feminine counterpart is Shirinova. Notable people with the surname include:

- Natig Shirinov (born 1975), Azerbaijani percussionist
- Vagif Shirinov (born 1969), Russian football player
