= Igor Dolmatov =

Russian footballer

Personal information
- Full name: Igor Nikolayevich Dolmatov
- Date of birth: 22 January 1970 (age 56)
- Place of birth: Nizhny Tagil, Russian SFSR
- Height: 1.85 m (6 ft 1 in)
- Positions: Defender; midfielder

Youth career
- FC Uralets Nizhny Tagil

Senior career*
Years	Team	Apps	(Gls)
1987–1988	FC Uralets Nizhny Tagil	52	(1)
1989	FC MTsOP-Metallurg Verkhnyaya Pyshma	30	(2)
1990–1991	FC Iskra Smolensk	40	(2)
1991	FC Uralets Nizhny Tagil	31	(3)
1992	FC Dynamo-Gazovik Tyumen	14	(0)
1992	FC Uralets Nizhny Tagil	11	(2)
1995	FC Gornyak Kushva	8	(0)
1995	FC Gornyak	2	(0)
1996	FC Stroitel Novouralsk		
1997	FC Yava-Kedr Novouralsk		
1998	FC Stroitel Novouralsk		
- * Club domestic league appearances and goals

Igor Nikolayevich Dolmatov (Russian: Игорь Николаевич Долматов; born 22 January 1970 in Nizhny Tagil) is a former Russian football player.
