= Gord =

Gord may refer to

- Gord (archaeology), medieval Slavic settlement
- Gord (given name), people and characters with the given name
- Gastro-oesophageal reflux disease (GORD), a stomach disorder
- Ken Gord (born 1949), Canadian film and television producer
- Gord (video game), a 2023 strategy game

== See also ==
- Gordian Knot
- Gordon
- Gordy (disambiguation)
- Gourd
