= Karamyan =

Karamyan is an (Armenian: Քարամյան) Armenian surname. Notable people with the surname include:

- Arman Karamyan (born 1979), Armenian-Russian footballer, twin brother of Artavazd
- Artavazd Karamyan (born 1979), Armenian-Russian footballer, twin brother of Arman
- Yuri Karamyan (born 1947), Russian football coach
