= Aleksandr Fyodorov (footballer, born 1970) =

Russian footballer

Personal information
- Full name: Aleksandr Sergeyevich Fyodorov
- Date of birth: 25 August 1970 (age 56)
- Place of birth: Zelenodolsk, Russian SFSR
- Height: 1.77 m (5 ft 9 1/2 in)
- Positions: Defender; midfielder

Senior career*
Years	Team	Apps	(Gls)
1988	FC Progress Zelenodolsk (amateur)		
1989–1990	FC Druzhba Yoshkar-Ola	44	(2)
1990	FC Progress Zelenodolsk (amateur)		
1991–1992	FC Druzhba Yoshkar-Ola	57	(19)
1992–1993	FC KAMAZ Naberezhnye Chelny	16	(0)
1993	→ FC KAMAZ-d Naberezhnye Chelny (loan)	1	(0)
1993–1994	FC Druzhba Yoshkar-Ola	66	(6)
1995	FC Neftekhimik Nizhnekamsk	27	(0)
1995–1998	FC Progress Zelenodolsk	84	(34)
1998–2001	FC Diana Volzhsk	105	(25)
2002	FC Alnas Almetyevsk	25	(0)
2003	FC Spartak Yoshkar-Ola	14	(1)
2004	FC Pozis Zelenodolsk (amateur)		
- * Club domestic league appearances and goals

Aleksandr Sergeyevich Fyodorov (Russian: Александр Сергеевич Фёдоров; born 25 August 1970) is a former Russian football player.
