= Oleg Zykov =

Russian footballer and coach

Personal information
- Full name: Oleg Alekseyevich Zykov
- Date of birth: 17 August 1970 (age 56)
- Place of birth: Kirov, Russian SFSR
- Height: 1.81 m (5 ft 11 1/2 in)
- Position: Forward

Youth career
- FC Dynamo Kirov

Senior career*
| Years | Team | Apps | (Gls) |
| 1987–1991 | FC Dynamo Kirov | 96 | (30) |
| 1992 | FC Krylia Sovetov Samara | 18 | (0) |
| 1993–1995 | FC Sokol Saratov | 51 | (9) |
| 1994 | → FC Sokol-d Saratov (loan) | 17 | (4) |
| 1995–1996 | FC Zavodchanin Saratov | 47 | (22) |
| 1997–1998 | FC Volga Ulyanovsk | 62 | (6) |
| 1999–2004 | FC Dynamo Kirov | 167 | (22) |
| 2013 | FC Mashinostroitel-DYuSSh-5 Kirov | | |

Managerial career
- 2006–2008: FC Dynamo Kirov (assistant)
- * Club domestic league appearances and goals

Oleg Alekseyevich Zykov (Russian: Олег Алексеевич Зыков; born 17 August 1970 in Kirov) is a Russian football coach and a former player.
