= Aleksandr Chimbiryov =

Russian footballer and manager

Personal information
- Full name: Aleksandr Petrovich Chimbiryov
- Date of birth: 17 November 1961 (age 64)
- Place of birth: Shakhtostroitel, Novomoskovsky District, Russian SFSR
- Height: 1.81 m (5 ft 11 1/2 in)
- Position: Midfielder

Senior career*
Years	Team	Apps	(Gls)
1979	FC Khimik Novomoskovsk	37	(3)
1980	FC TOZ Tula	21	(2)
1983–1987	FC Arsenal Tula	131	(15)
1987–1988	FC Kuzbass Kemerovo	41	(1)
1989	FC Arsenal Tula	8	(3)
1989	FC Kuzbass Kemerovo	29	(0)
1990–1992	FC Uralmash Yekaterinburg	60	(7)

Managerial career
- 1993: FC Uralelektromed Verkhnyaya Pyshma (assistant)
- 1995: FC Luch Tula (assistant)
- 1996: FC Luch Tula
- 1997–1998: FC Arsenal Tula (assistant)
- 2000–2001: FC Arsenal-2 Tula
- 2007: FC Don Novomoskovsk (administrator)
- 2008–2011: FC Arsenal Tula
- * Club domestic league appearances and goals

Aleksandr Petrovich Chimbiryov (Russian: Александр Петрович Чимбирёв; born 17 November 1961) is a Russian football manager and a former player.
