= Gornik =

Gornik may refer to one of the following.

- Gornik, Pleven Province, a village in Cherven Bryag Municipality, Bulgaria
- April Gornik, an American painter
- Górnik (meaning "miner" in Polish) is a common name of Polish sports teams:
  - Górnik Konin
  - Górnik Łęczna
    - Stadion Górnika, their stadium
  - Górnik Polkowice
  - Górnik Radlin
  - Górnik Wałbrzych
  - Górnik Wieliczka
  - Górnik Zabrze

== See also ==
- Hirnyk (disambiguation)
- Gornyak (disambiguation)
