= Sergei Panov =

Sergei Panov (Russian: Сергей Панов) may refer to:

- Sergei Panov (basketball) (born 1970), Russian basketball player
- Sergei Panov (footballer, born 1984), Russian football player
- Sergei Panov (footballer, born 1989), Russian football player
