= FC Kabardey-ZET Nizhny Cherek =

- Full name: Football Club Kabardey-ZET Nizhny Cherek
- League: Russian Third League, Zone 1
- 1996: 13th

FC Kabardey-ZET Nizhny Cherek (Russian: «Кабардей‑ЗЭТ» (Нижний Черек)) was a Russian football team from Nizhny Cherek, Kabardino-Balkaria. It played professionally for one season in 1996, taking 13th place in Zone 1 of the Russian Third League. It also played in Kabardino-Balkaria championship.
