= Ruslan Usikov =

Russian footballer

Personal information
- Full name: Ruslan Nikolayevich Usikov
- Date of birth: 10 April 1975 (age 51)
- Place of birth: Bryansk, Russian SFSR
- Height: 1.85 m (6 ft 1 in)
- Position: Forward

Senior career*
| Years | Team | Apps | (Gls) |
| 1995–1996 | Dynamo Bryansk | 50 | (19) |
| 1997 | Gazovik-Gazprom Izhevsk | 19 | (1) |
| 1998–2000 | Dynamo Bryansk | 92 | (38) |
| 2001–2002 | Dnepr-Transmash Mogilev | 33 | (8) |
| 2002–2004 | Dynamo Bryansk | 96 | (25) |
| 2005 | SKA-Energiya Khabarovsk | 39 | (8) |
| 2006 | Dynamo Bryansk | 18 | (2) |
| 2006 | Fakel Voronezh | 17 | (3) |
| 2007 | Mashuk-KMV Pyatigorsk | 36 | (5) |
| 2008 | Dynamo Saint Petersburg | 18 | (7) |
| 2008–2009 | MVD Rossii Moscow | 23 | (3) |
| 2009–2010 | Dynamo Bryansk | 30 | (3) |
| 2011–2012 | Sakhalin Yuzhno-Sakhalinsk | 9 | (2) |
- * Club domestic league appearances and goals

Ruslan Nikolayevich Usikov (Russian: Руслан Николаевич Усиков; born 10 April 1975) is a former Russian professional footballer.
