= FC Stroitel Morshansk =

- Full name: Football Club Stroitel Morshansk
- Founded: 1995
- Dissolved: 2003
- League: Amateur Football League, Zone Chernozemye
- 2002: 8th

FC Stroitel Morshansk (Russian: «Строитель» (Моршанск)) was a Russian football team from Morshansk. It played professionally from 1996 to 1998. Their best result was 20th place in the Zone Centre of the Russian Second Division in 1998.
