= Magomed-Rasul Akhmedov =

Russian footballer and coach

Personal information
- Full name: Magomed-Rasul Ramazanovich Akhmedov
- Date of birth: 20 September 1966 (age 60)
- Place of birth: Shovkra, Russian SFSR
- Position: Midfielder

Senior career*
Years	Team	Apps	(Gls)
1982–1984	FC Dynamo Makhachkala	52	(4)
1985	FC Dynamo Moscow	0	(0)
1987–1990	FC Dynamo Makhachkala	89	(8)
1991	FC Nart Cherkessk	33	(2)
1992	FC Spartak Anapa	13	(0)
1993	FC Anzhi Makhachkala	9	(1)
1994	FC Argo Kaspiysk	2	(0)

Managerial career
- 1994: FC Argo Kaspiysk
- 1995–1996: FC Anzhi-2 Kaspiysk (assistant)
- 2006–2011: FC Dagdizel Kaspiysk
- 2012–2016: FC Anzhi Makhachkala (academy scout)
- 2016–2021: FC Anzhi Makhachkala (academy)
- 2021: FC Anzhi Makhachkala (assistant)
- 2023–2024: FC Dynamo-2 Makhachkala
- * Club domestic league appearances and goals

Magomed-Rasul Ramazanovich Akhmedov (Russian: Магомед-Расул Рамазанович Ахмедов; born 20 September 1966) is a Russian professional football coach and a former player.

== Playing career ==
As a player, he made his debut in the Soviet Second League in 1982 for FC Dynamo Makhachkala.

He made his Russian Football National League debut for FC Spartak Anapa on 27 June 1992 in a game against FC Tekstilshchik Ivanovo. That was his only season in the FNL.
