= Vladislav Khakhalev =

Russian footballer

Personal information
- Full name: Vladislav Gennadyevich Khakhalev
- Date of birth: 5 January 1966 (age 60)
- Height: 1.75 m (5 ft 9 in)
- Positions: Forward; midfielder

Youth career
- Motor Vladimir

Senior career*
Years	Team	Apps	(Gls)
1987–1991	FC Torpedo Vladimir	161	(43)
1992	FC Asmaral Moscow	21	(3)
1992–1993	Wydad Casablanca		
1993	FC Asmaral Moscow	6	(1)
1993	→ FC Asmaral-d Moscow	3	(1)
1995–1999	FC Torpedo Vladimir	142	(43)
2000	FC Torpedo Vladimir (amateur)		
2001–2003	FC Torpedo Vladimir	101	(2)
- * Club domestic league appearances and goals

Vladislav Gennadyevich Khakhalev (Russian: Владислав Геннадьевич Хахалев; born 5 January 1966) is a former Russian professional football player.

== Honours ==
- Russian Third League Zone 4 top scorer: 1996 (18 goals).
