= Aleksandr Shtyn =

Russian footballer

Personal information
- Full name: Aleksandr Sergeyevich Shtyn
- Date of birth: 7 March 1978 (age 48)
- Place of birth: Weimar, East Germany
- Height: 1.69 m (5 ft 6 1/2 in)
- Position: Midfielder

Senior career*
Years	Team	Apps	(Gls)
1995	FC Zhemchuzhina Sochi	4	(1)
1995–1996	FC Zhemchuzhina-d Sochi	45	(13)
1997–2000	FC Zvezda Irkutsk	102	(15)
2001–2005	FC Chkalovets-1936 Novosibirsk	92	(17)
2005	FC Dynamo Barnaul	10	(0)
2006–2007	FC Zvezda Irkutsk	44	(12)
2008	FC KUZBASS Kemerovo	27	(9)
2009	FC Sakhalin Yuzhno-Sakhalinsk	24	(4)
2010–2011	FC Radian-Baikal Irkutsk	45	(4)
2011–2012	FC Sakhalin Yuzhno-Sakhalinsk	16	(2)
- * Club domestic league appearances and goals

Aleksandr Sergeyevich Shtyn (Russian: Александр Серге́евич Штынь; born 7 March 1978) is a former Russian professional footballer.

== Playing career ==
He made his debut in the Russian Premier League in 1995 for FC Zhemchuzhina Sochi.
