= Yuri Adzhem =

Russian football player and coach (born 1953)

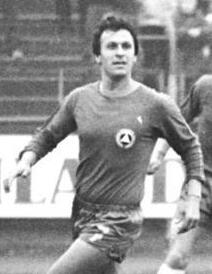
- Adzhem in 1986

Personal information
- Full name: Yuri Nikolayevich Adzhem
- Date of birth: 14 January 1953 (age 73)
- Place of birth: Kerch, Crimean Oblast, Russian SFSR
- Positions: Defender; midfielder

Youth career
- Metalurh Kerch

Senior career*
Years	Team	Apps	(Gls)
1971–1978	SC Tavriya Simferopol	237	(59)
1979–1983	CSKA Moscow	107	(9)
1984–1986	BSG Motor Ludwigsfelde		
1986–1988	Kabelwerk Oberspree		
1988–1990	BSG Motor Eberswalde		
1990–1991	SC Gatow (Germany)	6	(1)

International career
1979	USSR	4	(0)

Managerial career
- 1994–1996: PFC CSKA Moscow (assistant)
- 1999: FC Arsenal Tula (assistant)
- 2000–2001: FC Chernomorets Novorossiysk (assistant)
- 2001–2002: FC Rostselmash Rostov-on-Don (assistant)
- 2003–2005: PFC CSKA Moscow (reserves assistant)
- 2006–2007: PFC CSKA Moscow (reserves)
- 2009–2010: PFC CSKA Moscow (reserves assistant)
- 2010–2017: PFC CSKA Moscow (academy)
- 2017–2021: PFC CSKA Moscow (U-21 assistant)
- * Club domestic league appearances and goals

Yuri Nikolayevich Adzhem (Russian: Юрий Николаевич Аджем, Ukrainian: Юрій Миколайович Аджем; born 14 January 1953) is a Russian former football coach and player.

== Honours ==
- 1976 UEFA European Under-23 Football Championship winner
- 1980 UEFA European Under-21 Football Championship winner

== International career ==
Adzhem made his debut for USSR on March 28, 1979, in a friendly against Bulgaria. He also played in a UEFA Euro 1980 qualifier against Hungary.
