= Yevgeni Kuzka =

Russian footballer

Personal information
- Full name: Yevgeni Nikolayevich Kuzka
- Date of birth: May 27, 1969 (age 57)
- Place of birth: Lipetsk, Russian SFSR
- Height: 1.77 m (5 ft 9 1/2 in)
- Positions: Forward; midfielder

Senior career*
Years	Team	Apps	(Gls)
1990	FC Metallurg Stary Oskol	13	(1)
1991	FC Start Yeysk	11	(1)
1991–1993	FC Shakhtyor Shakhty	88	(14)
1994	FC Khimik Dankov	32	(23)
1995–1996	FC Metallurg Lipetsk	56	(17)
1996–1997	FC Lokomotiv Yelets	28	(22)
1997	FC Dynamo Stavropol	6	(0)
1998–1999	FC Spartak Ryazan	67	(28)
2000	FC Vityaz Podolsk (D4)		
2001	FC Agrokomplekt Ryazan	11	(1)
2001–2002	FC Spartak Tambov	24	(5)
- * Club domestic league appearances and goals

Yevgeni Nikolayevich Kuzka (Russian: Евгений Николаевич Кузка; born 27 May 1969) is a former Russian professional football player.

== Club career ==
He made his Russian Football National League debut for FC Dynamo Stavropol on 7 August 1997 in a game against FC Luch Vladivostok.

== Honours ==
- Russian Third League Zone 2 top scorer: 1994 (23 goals).
