= Oleg Yeryomin =

Russian footballer (born 1967)

Personal information
- Full name: Oleg Adolfovich Yeryomin
- Date of birth: 28 October 1967 (age 59)
- Place of birth: Ufa, Russian SFSR
- Height: 1.85 m (6 ft 1 in)
- Position: Forward

Senior career*
Years	Team	Apps	(Gls)
1985	FC Gastello Ufa	20	(2)
1988–1989	FC Gastello Ufa	50	(2)
1989–1992	FC Spartak Anapa	101	(32)
1993	FC Gekris Novorossiysk	26	(4)
1994	FC Estel Ufa	24	(14)
1995	FC Saturn-1991 Saint Petersburg	19	(6)
1995–1996	FC Zenit Saint Petersburg	35	(2)
1995–1996	→ FC Zenit-d Saint Petersburg	6	(1)
1997	FC Energiya Kamyshin	22	(12)
1997	FC Lokomotiv Moscow	1	(0)
1997	Pohang Steelers	4	(0)
1998	Qianwei Huandao	3	(0)
1998	FC Lokomotiv Nizhny Novgorod	12	(2)
1999	FC Arsenal Tula	4	(0)
2000	FC Dynamo-Stroyimpuls St. Petersburg (amateur)		

Managerial career
- 2003: FC Torpedo-Metallurg Moscow (director of sports)
- * Club domestic league appearances and goals

Oleg Adolfovich Yeryomin (Russian: Олег Адольфович Ерёмин; born 28 October 1967) is a former Russian football player.

== Club career ==
He made his Russian Premier League debut for FC Zenit Saint Petersburg on 2 March 1996 in a game against FC KAMAZ-Chally Naberezhnye Chelny. He also played one game in the top tier for FC Lokomotiv Moscow in 1997.
