= Kamil Ferkhanov =

Russian footballer (1964–2021)

Personal information
- Full name: Kamil Abdulbariyevich Ferkhanov
- Date of birth: 5 September 1964
- Place of birth: Dushanbe, Tajik SSR, Soviet Union
- Date of death: 17 June 2021 (aged 56)
- Place of death: Ulyanovsk, Russia
- Height: 1.70 m (5 ft 7 in)
- Positions: Forward; midfielder

Senior career*
| Years | Team | Apps | (Gls) |
| 1982–1985 | FC Pamir Dushanbe | 21 | (0) |
| 1986–1988 | FC Iskra Smolensk | | |
| 1989 | FC Khodzhent Leninabad | 39 | (10) |
| 1990–1991 | FC Regar Tursun-Zade | 85 | (41) |
| 1992–1996 | FC Turbostroitel Kaluga | 108 | (26) |
| 1997 | GBK Kokkola | 11 | (3) |
| 1998–1999 | Volga Ulyanovsk | 57 | (12) |
- * Club domestic league appearances and goals

Kamil Abdulbariyevich Ferkhanov (Russian: Камиль Абдулбариевич Ферханов; 5 September 1964 – 17 June 2021) was a Russian professional footballer who played as a forward or midfielder.

== Career ==
Ferkhanov played five seasons in the Soviet First League with FC Pamir Dushanbe. He died of a heart attack on 17 June 2021 at the age of 56, while playing in a football game in Avangard Stadium, Ulyanovsk.

== Honours ==
- Russian Third League Zone 4 top scorer: 1995 (11 goals).
