= Jord International =

- Company type: Private
- Industry: Engineering, Oil & Gas, Power Generation, Sugar, Minerals
- Founded: 1972 (as Jord Engineers)
- Headquarters: St Leonards, New South Wales, Australia
- Area served: Worldwide
- Key people: CEO; Greg Jones; Executive Chair; Angus Holden; Executive Committee; Jan Keussink; Kevin Barber; Matt Marinovich; Andrew Eagleton; Erin Collins; Claire Jelbart
- Revenue: ▲AUD 200,000,000 (2019)
- Number of employees: 300+ (2019)
- Website: www.jord.com.au

Jord International is an Australian owned company that designs, manufactures, commissions, and services custom-engineered process equipment, modular skids, and turnkey plants for the oil & gas, chemical, power, food, industrial and mining sectors.

== History ==
=== Creation ===
In 1972, a group of Australian engineers, specializing in solid-liquid separation, air coolers, and furnaces, created Jord Engineers Pty Ltd. The group devised a proposal to design and build vessels for major energy companies working in Australia. Later in the 1970s, Jord developed its business within Australia, working on drum filters (1973), turnkey plants (1974), and air coolers (1976). In 1980, Jord received an order to design and build the world’s largest filter station.

=== Expansion ===
During the 1980s, Jord proceeded to establish partnerships with customers and suppliers. Jord started to work outside of Australia, with overseas projects in New Zealand, Malaysia, Singapore, Thailand, Indonesia and New Guinea, between 1986 and 1988. In 1988, an office was opened in Singapore to reinforce Jord’s position in South East Asia. In the 1990s, Jord continued to expand throughout Asia, opening offices in China, Vietnam, and Korea. The company also secured its first contracts in the Middle East, with Oman in 1993 and Saudi Arabia in 1995. In 1994, Jord’s offices in Australia and Singapore were ISO 9001-certified by Bureau Veritas, As of 2012, Jord's offices have maintained their accreditation. Offices in China and India were opened in 2004 and 2006, respectively. Jord Malaysia was established in 2006 to manufacture air cooled heat exchangers for the Jord Group. During the same period, Jord developed its activities in South America (Argentina, Brazil, Bolivia), Europe (The Netherlands, United Kingdom (UK), France, Germany), the Middle East (UAE, Iran, Pakistan, Qatar). A new office was opened in Dubai in 2006 to service the Middle East markets. In 2010, a new office was established in India. Jord has several offices in Australia aside from the Sydney headquarters, namely in Newcastle and Perth. In 2012, Jord launched Jord Oil and Gas Systems B.V. a 50/50 JV based in Rotterdam to service larger scale oil & gas compression and EPC style projects. Jord opened offices in New Jersey, USA in 2017. Asia has been a region in which Jord has thrived with operations based in Qingdao (China), Singapore, Dubai and India.

=== The Jord Environment Trust ===
In 2007, Jord started a philanthropic foundation. The Jord Environment Trust, otherwise known as “JET” was created with a charter to donate funds to causes that foster a biologically diverse and sustainable planet. A percentage of group profit is contributed to the fund each year. Over $2m has been raised to date.
