= Anatoli Balaluyev =

Russian footballer

Personal information
- Full name: Anatoli Anatolyevich Balaluyev
- Date of birth: 16 February 1976 (age 50)
- Place of birth: Shatura, Russian SFSR
- Height: 1.84 m (6 ft 1/2 in)
- Position: Forward

Senior career*
Years	Team	Apps	(Gls)
1994	FC Gigant Voskresensk	15	(6)
1995–1999	FC Avtomobilist Noginsk	182	(90)
2000	FC Spartak-2 Moscow	4	(0)
2000	FC Alania Vladikavkaz	3	(0)
2001	FC Gazovik-Gazprom Izhevsk	19	(2)
2002	FC Dynamo-SPb St. Petersburg	10	(1)
2002	FC Spartak Lukhovitsy	15	(1)
2003–2004	FC Oryol	54	(22)
2004	FC Spartak Lukhovitsy	12	(9)
2005	FC Yelets	14	(5)
2006	FC Ryazan-Agrokomplekt Ryazan	14	(0)
2006–2010	FC Zvezda Serpukhov	98	(21)
- * Club domestic league appearances and goals

Anatoli Anatolyevich Balaluyev (Russian: Анатолий Анатольевич Балалуев; born 16 February 1976) is a former Russian professional footballer.

He made his debut in the Russian Premier League in 2000 for FC Alania Vladikavkaz.

== Honours ==
- Russian Second Division Zone West top scorer: 1999 (22 goals).
