= Gord (video game) =

- Developer: Covenant.dev
- Publisher: Team17
- Engine: Unreal Engine 4
- Platforms: PlayStation 5; Windows; Xbox Series X/S
- Release: WW: August 17, 2023
- Genre: Strategy
- Mode: Single-player

Gord is a strategy video game developed by Covenant.dev and published by Team17. Players must manage a settlement under constant threat of attack by monsters. It combines elements of role-playing, real-time strategy, and city-building games.

== Gameplay ==
A king who has conquered the southern lands in a dark fantasy world tasks players with establishing a gord (fortified settlement) in the northern lands. They must manage a settlement near a haunted forest occupied by demonic monsters inspired by Slavic mythology. Gameplay combines elements of role-playing, real-time strategy, and city-building games. Some of the monsters require players to complete tasks, such as fetch quests or sacrificing children. While building up the settlement, players have a limited amount of space to work within, necessitating decisions on what to build. Villagers have three meters: health, sanity, and faith. Villagers die if they run out of health in combat; sanity loss from the horror of their conditions can cause them to make poor decisions; and spells become unavailable if their faith drops too low. During combat, players control the villagers like in a real-time strategy game. The maps are procedurally generated. A limited number of villagers can start over in a new settlement after players complete all the goals for that map.

== Development ==
Team17 released Gord for PlayStation 5, Windows, and Xbox Series X/S on August 17. The Alliance, downloadable content for Windows, is scheduled to be released on February 28, 2024. Among other additions, it includes a new campaign.

== Reception ==
On Metacritic, Gord received mixed reviews for Windows and PlayStation 5. IGN called it "as miserable as its downtrodden villagers" and criticized what they felt were "monotonous micromanagement, a poor interface, and by-the-numbers combat". Though they liked the atmosphere, PC Gamer said it is "a thoroughly middling blend of city-building, survival gaming, and RTS". Rock Paper Shotgun similarly described it as "detailed and moody" but said it is "a disappointing game that fails to capture the appeal of any of its component genres". GamesRadar also enjoyed Gord's atmosphere and said it has a strong start. However, they felt it becomes repetitive and can not compete against the many city-building games available today.
