= Aleksandr Vasin =

Russian basketball coach

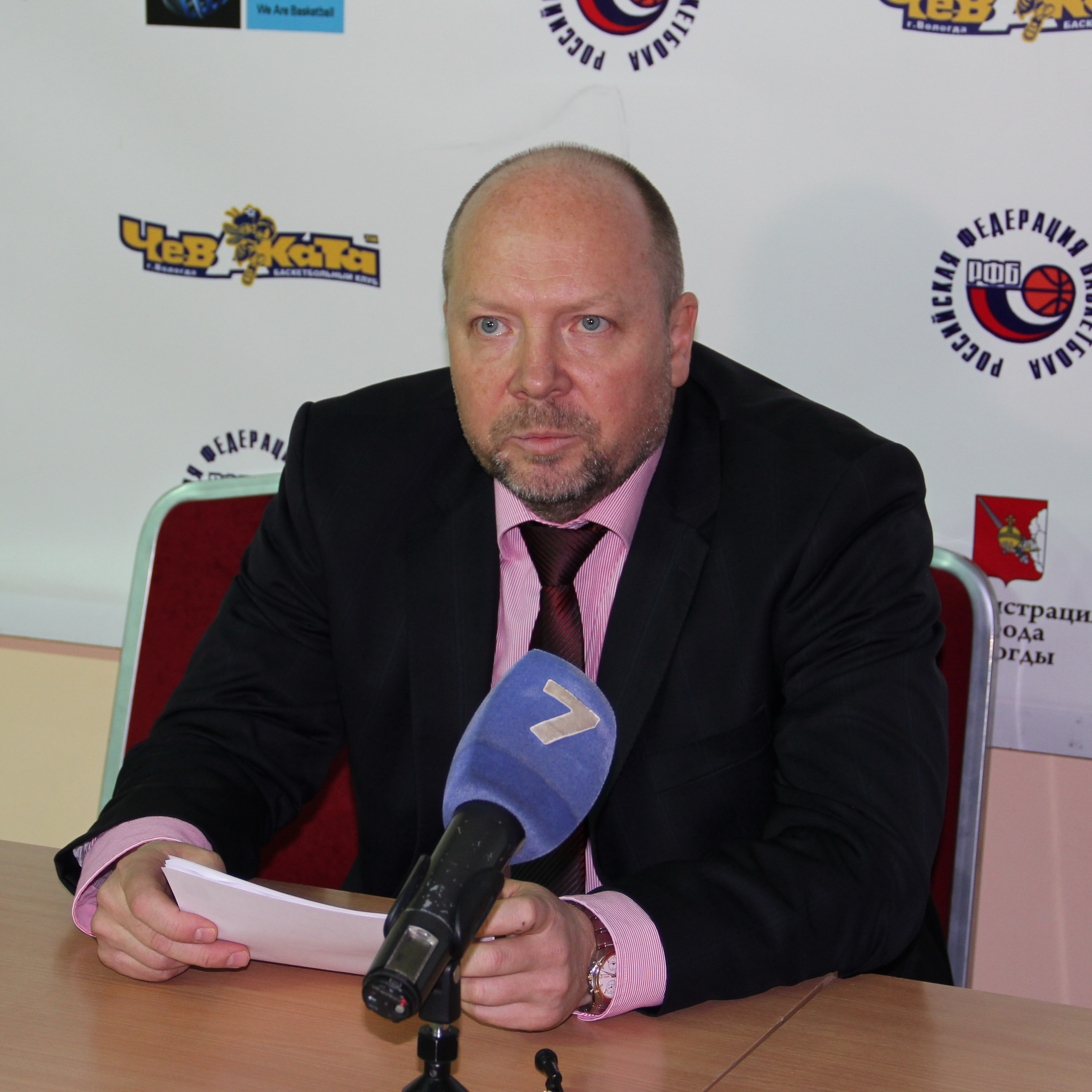
Aleksandr Vasin

Aleksandr Vasin is a Russian basketball coach of the Russian national team, which he coached at the EuroBasket Women 2017.
