= FC Khimik Meleuz =

- Full name: Football Club Khimik Meleuz
- Founded: 1993
- Dissolved: 1995
- League: Russian Third League, Zone 6
- 1994: 14th

FC Khimik Meleuz (Russian: «Химик» (Мелеуз)) was a Russian football team from Meleuz. It played professionally for one season in the Russian Third League in 1994..
