= Vladimir Naydanov =

Russian footballer

Personal information
- Full name: Vladimir Anatolyevich Naydanov
- Date of birth: 10 February 1972 (age 54)
- Place of birth: Kurgan, Kurgan Oblast, RSFSR, USSR
- Height: 1.80 m (5 ft 11 in)
- Positions: Forward; midfielder

Youth career
- DYuSSh-3 Kurgan

Senior career*
Years	Team	Apps	(Gls)
1988	FC Torpedo Kurgan		
1990–1991	FC Sibir Kurgan	38	(5)
1993–1994	FC Sibir Kurgan	54	(21)
1995–1997	FC Lokomotiv Nizhny Novgorod	32	(3)
1999	FC Lokomotiv Chita	23	(1)
2000	FC Uralmash Yekaterinburg	18	(3)
2001	FC Dynamo Bryansk	31	(5)
2003–2004	FC Tobol Kurgan	60	(8)
2005	FC Tobol Tobolsk (D4)		
- * Club domestic league appearances and goals

Vladimir Anatolyevich Naydanov (Russian: Владимир Анатольевич Найданов; born 10 February 1972) is a former Russian professional football player.

== Honours ==
- Russian Third League Zone 6 top scorer: 1994 (19 goals).
