= Yuri Karamyan =

Russian football coach (born 1947)

Personal information
- Full name: Yuri Rubenovich Karamyan
- Date of birth: March 15, 1947 (age 79)

Managerial career
- Years: Team
- 1990: FC Regar Tursun-Zade
- 1991: FC Regar Tursun-Zade
- 1993: FC Obninsk
- 1994: FC Oka Kolomna
- 1994: FC Orekhovo Orekhovo-Zuyevo
- 1995–1997: FC Industriya Borovsk
- 2000: FC Luch Vladivostok
- 2001: FC Selenga Ulan-Ude
- 2002: FC Severstal Cherepovets (assistant)
- 2002–2003: FC Uralets Nizhny Tagil

Yuri Rubenovich Karamyan (Russian: Юрий Рубенович Карамян; born March 15, 1947) is a Russian professional football coach.
