= FC Kolos Bykovo =

- Full name: Football Club Kolos Bykovo
- Founded: 1993
- Dissolved: 1995
- League: Russian Third League, Zone 2
- 1994: 14th

FC Kolos Bykovo (Russian: «Колос» (Быково)) was a Russian football team from Bykovo, Volgograd Oblast. It played professionally for one season in 1994 in the Russian Third League.
