= Sergei Bespalykh =

Russian footballer and referee

Personal information
- Full name: Sergei Alekseyevich Bespalykh
- Date of birth: 6 February 1973 (age 53)
- Place of birth: Moscow, Russian SFSR
- Height: 1.88 m (6 ft 2 in)
- Position: Forward

Youth career
- FC Spartak Moscow

Senior career*
Years	Team	Apps	(Gls)
1991	FC Volga Tver	11	(1)
1992	FC TRASKO Moscow	29	(3)
1993–1994	FC Chertanovo Moscow	61	(12)
1995–1996	FC Avangard-Kortek Kolomna	72	(38)
1996	FC Dnipro Dnipropetrovsk	1	(0)
1997	FC Metalurh Novomoskovsk	6	(1)
1997	FC Prykarpattya Ivano-Frankivsk	8	(3)
1997	→ FC Tysmenytsia (loan)	1	(0)
1998	FC Dnipro Dnipropetrovsk	20	(2)
1998	→ FC Dnipro-2 Dnipropetrovsk	7	(3)
1999	Kapaz PFK	2	(1)
2000	FC Metallurg Krasnoyarsk	16	(4)
2001	FC Fabus Bronnitsy	13	(5)
2001–2002	FC Tom Tomsk	8	(2)
2002	FC Metallurg Krasnoyarsk	10	(2)
2003	FC Spartak Lukhovitsy	17	(2)
2004	FC Kolomna (amateur)		
2004–2005	FC Troitsk-2001		

Managerial career
- 2016: FC StArs Kolomensky Rayon
- * Club domestic league appearances and goals

Sergei Alekseyevich Bespalykh (Russian: Серге́й Алексеевич Беспалых; born 6 February 1973) is a former Russian professional football player and referee.

== Honours ==
- Russian Third League Zone 3 top scorer: 1996 (25 goals).

== Referee career ==
In 2005 and 2006, he worked as a referee, mostly in the Russian Second Division.
