= Gornyak (inhabited locality) =

Gornyak (Russian: Горняк) is the name of several inhabited localities in Russia.

== Modern localities ==
Urban localities

- Gornyak, Altai Krai, a town in Loktevsky District of Altai Krai

Rural localities

- Gornyak, Kemerovo Oblast, a settlement in Gornyatskaya Rural Territory of Leninsk-Kuznetsky District of Kemerovo Oblast
- Gornyak, Mari El Republic, a settlement in Chendemerovsky Rural Okrug of Sernursky District of the Mari El Republic
- Gornyak, Ryazan Oblast, a settlement in Gornyatsky Rural Okrug of Miloslavsky District of Ryazan Oblast
- Gornyak, Tula Oblast, a settlement in Krasnoyarsky Rural Okrug of Kireyevsky District of Tula Oblast
- Gornyak, Tver Oblast, a settlement in Gornyatskoye Rural Settlement of Vyshnevolotsky District of Tver Oblast
- Gornyak, Udmurt Republic, a selo in Gornyaksky Selsoviet of Mozhginsky District of the Udmurt Republic

== Historical localities ==
- Gornyak, Chelyabinsk Oblast, a former urban-type settlement in Chelyabinsk Oblast; since 2004—a part of the town of Kopeysk
