= Hirnyk (surname) =

Hirnyk (Ukrainian: Гірник) is a surname of Ukrainian origin. It literally means a miner (occupation).

== Notable Hirnyks ==
- Oleksa Hirnyk (1912–1978), Hero of Ukraine, a Soviet dissident, burned himself in protest against Russification

== See also ==
- Eastern Slavic naming customs
