= Muslim Daliyev =

Russian footballer and coach

Personal information
- Full name: Muslim Murdalovich Daliyev
- Date of birth: 16 June 1964 (age 62)
- Place of birth: Grozny, Russian SFSR
- Position: Midfielder

Senior career*
Years	Team	Apps	(Gls)
1987–1988	FC Baltika Kaliningrad	29	(0)
1988	FC Torpedo Taganrog	9	(0)
1989	FC Svetotekhnika Saransk	14	(0)
1989–1990	FC Lokomotiv Mineralnye Vody	41	(2)
1991	FC Remontnik Prokhladny	34	(3)
1992–1994	FC Gigant Grozny	80	(7)
1995	FC Lokomotiv Mineralnye Vody	28	(2)

Managerial career
- 1994: FC Gigant Grozny
- 2000: FC Naur Naurskaya
- 2001–2002: FC Angusht Nazran (assistant)
- 2003: FC Shakhtyor Shakhty
- 2006–2007: FC Spartak-Naur Naurskaya
- 2009–2011: FC Vaynakh Shali
- 2016–2017: FC Legion-Dynamo Makhachkala
- 2018: FC Angusht Nazran
- 2018–2019: FC Akademiya Futbola Rostov-on-Don
- * Club domestic league appearances and goals

Muslim Murdalovich Daliyev (Russian: Муслим Мурдалович Далиев; born 16 June 1964) is a Russian football coach and a former player.

== Personal life ==
His sons Deni Daliyev and Daud Daliyev are footballers.
