= Vladimir Titov (footballer) =

Russian footballer

Personal information
- Full name: Vladimir Viktorovich Titov
- Date of birth: 8 May 1969 (age 57)
- Place of birth: Kamensk-Uralsky, Russian SFSR
- Height: 1.82 m (5 ft 11 1/2 in)
- Position: Midfielder

Youth career
- Stroitel Kamensk-Uralsky
- FC Uralmash Yekaterinburg

Senior career*
Years	Team	Apps	(Gls)
1989–1990	FC Rumb Kamensk-Uralsky		
1991–1993	FC Trubnik Kamensk-Uralsky (amateur)		
1993	FC Uralmash Yekaterinburg	4	(0)
1994–1997	FC Trubnik Kamensk-Uralsky	95	(25)
1998–1999	FC Stroitel Novouralsk		
2001–2003	FC Sinara Kamensk-Uralsky		
- * Club domestic league appearances and goals

Vladimir Viktorovich Titov (Russian: Владимир Викторович Титов; born 8 May 1969) is a former Russian professional football player.

== Honours ==
- Russian Third League Zone 6 top scorer: 1995 (12 goals).
