= Gord (given name) =

Gord is a given name, usually a diminutive form of Gordon, and is seen as uniquely and idiosyncratically Canadian.

Notable people with the name include:

- Gord Cruickshank (1965–2021), Canadian ice hockey player
- Gord Downie (1964–2017), Canadian singer and guitarist with the Tragically Hip
- Gord Johns (born 1969), Canadian politician from British Columbia
- Gordon Lightfoot (1938–2023), Canadian singer-songwriter sometimes referred to as "Gord"
- Gord Martineau (born 1947), Canadian television journalist
- Gord Miller (environmental commissioner) (born 1953), Canadian politician and Environmental Commissioner of Ontario
- Gord Sinclair, Canadian bass guitarist with The Tragically Hip
- Gord Stellick (born 1957), Canadian sportscaster
- Gord Bamford, Australian-Canadian country singer

== Fictional characters ==
- Gord the Rogue, fictional character created by Gary Gygax
- Gord, fictional character in the television series Between
- Gord, fictional character from the video game Mobile Legends: Bang Bang
- Gord Vendome, a character in the video game Bully
- Ranger Gord, fictional character on The Red Green Show

== See also ==
- Gord Afrid (Gordafarid) was a female warrior in Shahnama
