= FC Khimik Dankov =

- Full name: Football Club Khimik Dankov
- Founded: 1993
- Dissolved: 1995
- League: Amateur Football League, Zone Center V
- 1995: Excluded

FC Khimik Dankov (Russian: «Химик» (Данков)) was a Russian football team from Dankov. It played professionally for one season, in Russian Third Division Zone 2 in 1994, taking 6th place.
