= Sergei Gorb =

Russian footballer and coach

Personal information
- Full name: Sergei Nikolayevich Gorb
- Date of birth: 29 October 1954 (age 71)
- Height: 1.78 m (5 ft 10 in)
- Positions: Defender; midfielder

Senior career*
Years	Team	Apps	(Gls)
1973–1986	FC Dynamo Stavropol	447	(53)

Managerial career
- 1986–1989: FC Dynamo Stavropol (team director)
- 1991: FC Dynamo Stavropol (team director)
- 1991: FC Dynamo Stavropol (assistant)
- 1992: FC Dynamo Stavropol (team director)
- 1992–1993: FC Dynamo Stavropol (assistant)
- 1997–1998: FC Dynamo Stavropol (assistant)
- 1999: FC Dynamo Stavropol (assistant)
- 1999–2000: FC Dynamo Stavropol
- 2000–2002: FC Dynamo Stavropol (assistant)
- * Club domestic league appearances and goals

Sergei Nikolayevich Gorb (Russian: Сергей Николаевич Горб; born 29 October 1954) is a Russian football coach and a former player.
