= Igor Degtyaryov =

Russian footballer and official

Personal information
- Full name: Igor Vladimirovich Degtyaryov
- Date of birth: 22 August 1976 (age 50)
- Place of birth: Orenburg, Russian SFSR
- Height: 1.78 m (5 ft 10 in)
- Position: Midfielder

Team information
- Current team: FC Orenburg (general director)

Youth career
- 1986–1992: FC Gazovik Orenburg

Senior career*
Years	Team	Apps	(Gls)
1993–1996	FC Gazovik Orenburg	92	(20)
1997–1998	FC KAMAZ-Chally Naberezhnye Chelny	59	(2)
1999–2006	FC Fakel Voronezh	238	(25)
2007	FC Gazovik Orenburg	19	(0)

Managerial career
- 2009–2013: FC Gazovik Orenburg (academy director)
- 2013–: FC Orenburg (general director)
- * Club domestic league appearances and goals

Igor Vladimirovich Degtyaryov (Russian: Игорь Владимирович Дегтярёв; born 22 August 1976) is a Russian professional football official and a former player. He is the general director of FC Orenburg.

As a player, he made his professional debut in the Russian Second Division in 1993 for FC Gazovik Orenburg.
