= Vagif Shirinov =

Russian footballer (born 1969)

Personal information
- Full name: Vagif Shamamedovich Shirinov
- Date of birth: 12 November 1969 (age 56)
- Place of birth: Baku, Azerbaijani SSR
- Height: 1.75 m (5 ft 9 in)
- Positions: Forward; midfielder

Senior career*
Years	Team	Apps	(Gls)
1989	FK Khazar Sumgayit	23	(4)
1990	Neftchi Baku PFC	23	(0)
1991	FC Energomash Belgorod	12	(0)
1991	FC Golubaya Niva Slavyansk-na-Kubani	23	(4)
1992–1995	FC Kuban Slavyansk-na-Kubani	114	(51)
1996–1997	FC CSK VVS-Kristall Smolensk	41	(7)
1997	FC Niva Slavyansk-na-Kubani	6	(0)
1998–1999	FC Biokhimik-Mordovia Saransk	60	(6)
2002	FC Nemkom Krasnodar	16	(2)
2003	FC Selenga Ulan-Ude	20	(1)
2004	FC Slavyansk Slavyansk-na-Kubani	7	(0)
- * Club domestic league appearances and goals

Vagif Shamamedovich Shirinov (Russian: Вагиф Шамамедович Ширинов; born 12 November 1969) is a former Russian professional football player.

== Club career ==
He played in the Russian Football National League for FC CSK VVS-Kristall Smolensk in 1997.

== Honours ==
- Russian Third League Zone 2 top scorer: 1995 (21 goals).
