= Sergei Panov (footballer, born 1989) =

Russian footballer

Personal information
- Full name: Sergei Vladimirovich Panov
- Date of birth: 13 July 1989 (age 37)
- Height: 1.90 m (6 ft 3 in)
- Position: Goalkeeper

Senior career*
Years	Team	Apps	(Gls)
2007–2010	FC Dynamo Moscow	0	(0)
2011–2014	FC Vityaz Podolsk	58	(0)
2014–2015	FC Dynamo Saint Petersburg	13	(0)
2015–2016	FC Sakhalin Yuzhno-Sakhalinsk	3	(0)

International career
2010	Russia U-21	1	(0)
- * Club domestic league appearances and goals

Sergei Vladimirovich Panov (Russian: Серге́й Владимирович Панов; born 13 July 1989) is a Russian former football goalkeeper.

== Club career ==
He made his debut in the Russian Second Division for FC Vityaz Podolsk on 8 July 2011 in a game against FC Gubkin.

He made his Russian Football National League debut for FC Dynamo Saint Petersburg on 6 July 2014 in a game against FC Tom Tomsk.
