= Viktor Ivanov (footballer) =

Russian footballer

Personal information
- Full name: Viktor Nikolayevich Ivanov
- Date of birth: 29 August 1960 (age 66)
- Height: 1.80 m (5 ft 11 in)
- Position: Defender

Youth career
- Neftyanik Omsk

Senior career*
| Years | Team | Apps | (Gls) |
| 1979–1982 | FC Irtysh Omsk | 80 | (15) |
| 1984–1985 | FC Irtysh Omsk | 66 | (5) |
| 1985–1987 | FC Rotor Volgograd | 65 | (1) |
| 1988–1989 | FC Geolog Tyumen | 60 | (1) |
| 1990–1991 | FC Shakhter Karagandy | 62 | (0) |
| 1992 | FC Uralets Nizhny Tagil | 30 | (2) |
| 1993 | FC Luch Vladivostok | 28 | (1) |
| 1994–1995 | FC Irtysh Omsk | 49 | (3) |
- * Club domestic league appearances and goals

Viktor Nikolayevich Ivanov (Russian: Виктор Николаевич Иванов; born 29 August 1960) is a former Russian football player.

== Career ==
Ivanov was a product of the Neftyanik Omsk youth football system. He made his professional debut with Irtysh Omsk in 1979, and would make over 200 appearances for the club over eight seasons. He played in the Soviet First League with Rotor Volgograd, Geolog Tyumen and Uralets Nizhny Tagil, and in the Russian Top League with Luch Vladivostok.
