= FC Alagir =

FC "Spartak" Alagir
- Full name: Football Club Alagir
- Founded: 1992
- Manager: Gogaev Mihail K.
- League: Amateur Football League, Zone South
- 1999: 16th

FC Alagir (Russian: «Алагир») was a Russian football team from Alagir. It played professionally in 1994 and 1995, their best result was 12th place in Zone 1 of the Russian Third League in 1994.

== Team name history ==
- 1992-1995 FC Spartak Alagir
- 1999 FC "Spartak" Alagir
