= FC Zavodchanin Saratov =

- Full name: Football Club Zavodchanin Saratov
- Founded: 1995
- Dissolved: 1997
- League: Russian Second League, Zone Centre
- 1996: 17th

FC Zavodchanin Saratov (Russian: «Заводчанин» (Саратов)) was a Russian football team from Saratov. It played professionally in 1995 and 1996. Their best result was 17th place in Zone Centre of the Russian Second League in 1996.
