= FC Industriya Borovsk =

- Full name: Football Club Industriya Borovsk
- Founded: 1991
- Dissolved: 1998
- League: Russian Third League, Zone 4
- 1997: 19th

FC Industriya Borovsk (Russian: ФК «Индустрия» (Боровск)) was a Russian football team from Borovsk. It played professionally from 1993 to 1997. Their best result was 4th place in Zone 4 of the Russian Second League in 1993.

== Team name and location history ==
- 1992–1994: FC Obninsk
- 1995: FC Industriya Obninsk
- 1996–1997: FC Industriya Borovsk

When the team moved to Borovsk, a new team was organized in Obninsk called FC Obninsk. That team played in the Russian Third League in 1996 and Russian Second Division in 2004. It was replaced in the Second Division by FC Zvezda Serpukhov in 2005.
