= FC Kristall Dyatkovo =

- Full name: Football Club Kristall Dyatkovo
- Founded: 1992
- Dissolved: 1997
- League: Russian Third League, Zone 4
- 1996: 12th

FC Kristall Dyatkovo (Russian: «Кристалл» (Дятьково)) was a Russian football team from Dyatkovo. It played professionally from 1994 to 1996. Their best result was 9th place in Zone 4 of the Russian Third League in 1995.
