= Valentin Volkov =

Russian footballer and coach

Personal information
- Full name: Valentin Viktorovich Volkov
- Date of birth: 23 January 1949 (age 77)
- Position: Defender

Senior career*
Years	Team	Apps	(Gls)
1969–1971	FC Shinnik Yaroslavl	85	(1)
1973	FC Saturn Rybinsk		
1974–1975	FC Spartak Kostroma		

Managerial career
- 1994–1997: FC Neftyanik Yaroslavl
- 1998–1999: FC Neftyanik Yaroslavl (president)
- 1998: FC Neftyanik Yaroslavl (caretaker)
- 1999: FC Neftyanik Yaroslavl
- 2000: FC Neftyanik Yaroslavl (VP)
- 2000–2001: FC Neftyanik Yaroslavl (director)
- 2002: FC Neftyanik Yaroslavl (VP)
- 2002: FC Neftyanik Yaroslavl (caretaker)
- * Club domestic league appearances and goals

Valentin Viktorovich Volkov (Russian: Валентин Викторович Волков; born 23 January 1949) is a Russian professional football coach and a former player.
