= FC Kolos Pokrovskoye =

Russian football club

- Full name: Football Club Kolos Pokrovskoye
- Founded: 1996
- League: Rostov Oblast Championship
- 2006: 10th

FC Kolos Pokrovskoye (Russian: «Колос») is a Russian football team from Pokrovskoye, Rostov Oblast. It played professionally for one season in 1996, taking 3rd place in the Zone 2 of the Russian Third League.

== Team name and location history ==
- 1996: FC Avangard-Kolos Taganrog
- 1997: FC Kolos Taganrog
- 1997: FC Kolos Pokrovskoye
- 1998: FC Spartak Taganrog
- 2003: FC Kolos Taganrog
- 2006: FC Kolos Pokrovskoye
