= FC Turbostroitel Kaluga =

- Full name: Football Club Turbostroitel Kaluga
- Founded: 1992
- Dissolved: 1997
- League: Russian Second Division, Zone West
- 1996: 19th

FC Turbostroitel Kaluga (Russian: ФК Турбостроитель Калуга) was a Russian football team from Kaluga.

It played professionally from 1992 to 1996. Their best result was 6th place in the Zone 3 of the Russian Second Division in 1993, Cup – 1/32 Finals draw in 1993/94.
