= Vladimir Grishchenko =

Russian footballer

Personal information
- Full name: Vladimir Aleksandrovich Grishchenko
- Date of birth: 20 March 1972 (age 54)
- Height: 1.76 m (5 ft 9 1/2 in)
- Positions: Forward; midfielder

Senior career*
Years	Team	Apps	(Gls)
1989–1990	FC Surkhon Termez	26	(1)
1992	FC Surkhon Termez	10	(1)
1993–1996	FC Niva Slavyansk-na-Kubani	89	(45)
1996	FC Chernomorets Novorossiysk	6	(0)
1996	→ FC Chernomorets-d Novorossiysk (loan)	10	(5)
1997–1998	FC Kuban Slavyansk-na-Kubani	46	(15)
1999	FC Nemkom Krasnodar (amateur)		
2000	FC Vityaz Krymsk	7	(0)
2001	FC Spartak Sumy	14	(0)
2001	FC Uholyok Dymytrov		
2001	FC Lokomotiv-ATP Ruzayevka		
2001–2002	FC Biokhimik-Mordovia Saransk	26	(4)
2002	FC Elektrotekhnik Kadoshkino		
- * Club domestic league appearances and goals

Vladimir Aleksandrovich Grishchenko (Russian: Владимир Александрович Грищенко; born 20 March 1972) is a former Russian football player.
