= FC Dynamo Tula =

- Full name: Football Club Dynamo Tula
- Founded: 1995
- Dissolved: 2003
- League: Russian Second Division, Zone Centre
- 2003: Excluded

FC Dynamo Tula (Russian: «Динамо» (Тула)) was a Russian football team from Tula. It played professionally from 1995 to 2003. Their best result was 14th place in Zone Centre of the Russian Second Division in 1998. There was a fierce rivalry between the two strongest teams of Tula, and the game between FC Arsenal Tula and Dynamo was known as Derby of the Tulones (or Столкновение мечей).

== Team name history ==
- 1995–1997 FC Luch Tula
- 1998–2002 FC Arsenal-2 Tula (the club was a farm team of FC Arsenal Tula during this period)
- 2003 FC Dynamo Tula
