= FC Pozis Zelenodolsk =

- Full name: Football Club Pozis Zelenodolsk
- Founded: 1960
- Dissolved: 2007
- League: Amateur Football League, Zone Privolzhye
- 2006: 5th

FC Pozis Zelenodolsk (Russian: «Позис» (Зеленодольск)) was a Russian football team from Zelenodolsk. It played professionally in 1960, 1963–1969 and 1993–1998. They played on the second-highest level in the Soviet First League in 1960, taking 13th place in Zone 4.

== Team name history ==
- 1960–1965: FC Progress Zelenodolsk
- 1966–1992: FC Chaika Zelenodolsk
- 1993–2003: FC Progress Zelenodolsk
- 2004–2006: FC Pozis Zelenodolsk
