= Viktor Zimin (football manager) =

Russian football manager (born 1950)

Personal information
- Full name: Viktor Vasilyevich Zimin
- Date of birth: March 4, 1950 (age 76)

Team information
- Current team: FC Dynamo Bryansk (asst coach)

Managerial career
- Years: Team
- 1981–1984: FC Dynamo Bryansk (assistant)
- 1986–1992: FC Dynamo Bryansk (assistant)
- 1994–1998: FC Dynamo Bryansk
- 1999–2001: FC Dynamo Bryansk (assistant)
- 2000: FC Dynamo Bryansk (caretaker)
- 2002: FC Dynamo Bryansk
- 2003–: FC Dynamo Bryansk (assistant)
- 2008: FC Dynamo Bryansk (caretaker)

Viktor Vasilyevich Zimin (Russian: Виктор Васильевич Зимин; born March 4, 1950) is a Russian professional football coach. Currently, he is an assistant coach with FC Dynamo Bryansk.

Zimin has been the interim manager of Dynamo Bryansk's senior squad on several occasions, most recently following the dismissal of Andrey Chernyshov in June 2008.
