= FC Salyut Saratov =

Russian football club

- Full name: Football Club Salyut Saratov
- Founded: 1965
- League: Amateur Football League, Zone Privolzhye
- 2009: 15th

FC Salyut Saratov (Russian: «Салют» (Саратов)) is a Russian football team from Saratov. It played professionally from 1994 to 2001. Their best result was 14th place in Zone Privolzhye of the Russian Second Division in 1999.
