= FC Gornyak Kachkanar =

- Full name: Football Club Gornyak Kachkanar
- Founded: 1992
- Dissolved: 2001
- League: Amateur Football League, Zone Ural
- 2000: 5th

FC Gornyak Kachkanar (Russian: «Горняк» (Качканар) translated as "mining worker")) was a Russian football team from Kachkanar. It played professionally from 1992 to 1997. Their best result was 6th place in Zone 5 of the Russian Second Division in 1992. Viktor Shlyayev who was Russian professional football coach led the team between 1992 and 1996.

== Team name history ==
- 1992–1994: FC Gornyak Kachkanar
- 1995: FC Gornyak-Vanadiy Kachkanar
- 1996–1997: FC Gornyak Kachkanar
