= FC Gornyak Kushva =

- Full name: Football Club Gornyak Kushva
- Founded: 1992
- Dissolved: 1997
- League: Russian Third League, Zone 6
- 1996: 10th

FC Gornyak Kushva (Russian: «Горняк» (Кушва)) was a Russian football team from Kushva. It played professionally in 1995 and 1996. Their best result was 7th place in Zone 6 of the Russian Third League in 1995.
