= 1991 in Soviet football =

Football in the Soviet Union
- Season: 1991

Men's football
- Top League: CSKA Moscow
- First League: Rotor Volgograd
- Second League: Karpaty Lvov (West); Asmaral Moscow (Center); Okean Nakhodka (East)
- Lower Second League: Neftianik Akhtyrka (Group 1); Siunik Kapan (Group 2); Khazar Sumgait (Group 3); Zhemchuzhina Sochi (Group 4); Spartak Anapa (Group 5); Dinamo Saint Petersburg (Group 6); Rubin Kazan (Group 7); Aktiubinets Aktiubinsk (Group 8); Traktor Tashkent (Group 9); Lokomotiv Chita (Group 10)
- Soviet Cup: CSKA Moscow
- Soviet Cup among KFK: Metallurg Molodechno

Women's football
- Top League: Tekstilschik Ramenskoye
- First League: Energiya Voronezh
- Second League: Rus Moscow
- Soviet Cup: Sibiryachka Krasnoyarsk

The 1991 Soviet football championship was the 60th seasons of competitive football in the Soviet Union. With the ongoing armed conflicts throughout the former Soviet Union (Moldova, Georgia, Tajikistan), the Army main football team, CSKA Moscow, won the Top League championship becoming the Soviet domestic champions for the seventh time. It became de facto the last full-scale season of the falling apart Soviet Union.

== Honours ==
=== Men's competitions ===
Competition		Winner	Runner-up
Top League		CSKA Moscow (7)	Spartak Moscow
First League		Rotor Volgograd (1)	Tiligul Tiraspol
Second League	West	Karpaty Lvov	Zaria Lugansk
Second League	Center	Asmaral Moscow	Krylia Sovetov Samara
Second League	East	Okean Nakhodka	Kopetdag Ashkhabad
Lower Second League	Group 1	Neftianik Akhtyrka	Prikarpatie Ivano-Frankovsk
Lower Second League	Group 2	Siunik Kapan	Shirak Giumri
Lower Second League	Group 3	Khazar Sumgait	Stroitel Baku
Lower Second League	Group 4	Zhemchuzhina Sochi	Uralan Elista
Lower Second League	Group 5	Spartak Anapa	Svetotekhnika Saransk
Lower Second League	Group 6	Dinamo Saint Petersburg	Tekstilschik Ivanovo
Lower Second League	Group 7	Rubin Kazan	Metallurg Magnitogorsk
Lower Second League	Group 8	Aktiubinets Aktiubinsk	Spartak Semipalatinsk
Lower Second League	Group 9	Traktor Tashkent	Umid Tashkent
Lower Second League	Group 10	Lokomotiv Chita	SKA Khabarovsk
Soviet Cup		CSKA Moscow (5)	Torpedo Moscow

Notes = Number in parentheses is the times that club has won that honour. * indicates new record for competition

=== Women's competitions ===
Competition	Winner	Runner-up
Top League	Tekstilschik Ramenskoye (1)	Nadezhda Mogilev
First League	Energiya Voronezh (1)	Spartak-13 Moscow
Second League	Rus Moscow (1)	Syuyumbike Zelenodolsk
Soviet Cup	Sibiryachka Krasnoyarsk (1*)	Prometei Saint Petersburg

Notes = Number in parentheses is the times that club has won that honour. * indicates new record for competition

== Soviet Union men's football championship ==
=== Top League ===
Pos	Team	Pld	W	D	L	GF	GA	GD	Pts	Qualification
1	(Russian Soviet Federative Socialist Republic) CSKA Moscow (C)	30	17	9	4	57	32	+25	43	Qualification for Champions League first round
2	(Russian Soviet Federative Socialist Republic) Spartak Moscow	30	17	7	6	57	30	+27	41	Qualification for Cup Winners' Cup first round
3	(Russian Soviet Federative Socialist Republic) Torpedo Moscow	30	13	10	7	36	20	+16	36	Qualification for UEFA Cup first round
4	(Ukrainian Soviet Socialist Republic) Chornomorets	30	10	16	4	39	24	+15	36	Withdrew from the league
5	(Ukrainian Soviet Socialist Republic) Dynamo Kyiv	30	13	9	8	43	34	+9	35	Withdrew from the league
6	(Russian Soviet Federative Socialist Republic) Dynamo Moscow	30	12	7	11	43	42	+1	31	Qualification for UEFA Cup first round
7	(Armenian Soviet Socialist Republic) Ararat	30	11	7	12	29	36	−7	29	Withdrew from the league
8	(Byelorussian Soviet Socialist Republic) Dinamo Minsk	30	9	11	10	29	31	−2	29	
9	(Ukrainian Soviet Socialist Republic) Dnipro	30	9	10	11	31	36	−5	28	Withdrew from the league
10	(Tajik Soviet Socialist Republic) Pamir Dushanbe	30	7	13	10	28	32	−4	27	
11	(Russian Soviet Federative Socialist Republic) Spartak Vladikavkaz	30	9	8	13	33	41	−8	26	
12	(Ukrainian Soviet Socialist Republic) Shakhtar Donetsk	30	6	14	10	33	41	−8	26	Withdrew from the league
13	(Ukrainian Soviet Socialist Republic) Metalurh Zaporizhzhia	30	9	7	14	27	38	−11	25 (Note: Metallurg received more head-to-head points against Pakhtakor.)	Withdrew from the league
14	(Uzbek Soviet Socialist Republic) Pakhtakor Tashkent	30	9	7	14	37	45	−8	25	
15	(Ukrainian Soviet Socialist Republic) Metalist Kharkiv (Note: Metallist placed last in total wins tie-breaker to Metallurg and Pakhtakor.)	30	8	9	13	32	43	−11	25	Withdrew from the league
16	(Russian Soviet Federative Socialist Republic) Lokomotiv Moscow	30	5	8	17	18	47	−29	18	Avoided relegation

Source: footbook.ru footballfacts.ru
Rules for classification: 1) Total points (If two or more teams have equal points for the first place, the winner is determined by additional single round-robin play-off on condition and place determined by the Federation); 2) Total wins; 3) Head-to-head results (3.1. points 3.2. goal difference 3.3. goal scored); 4) Total goal difference; 5) Total games scored; 6) Draw lots
(C) Champions

=== First League ===
Pos	Team	Pld	W	D	L	GF	GA	GD	Pts	Qualification or relegation
1	(Russian Soviet Federative Socialist Republic) Rotor Volgograd (C)	42	24	11	7	79	44	+35	59	Promoted to the 1992 Soviet Top League
2	(Moldavian Soviet Socialist Republic) Tiligul Tiraspol	42	22	10	10	64	45	+19	54	Promoted to the 1992 Soviet Top League
3	(Russian Soviet Federative Socialist Republic) Uralmash Yekaterinburg/Sverdlovsk	42	21	9	12	68	40	+28	51	Promoted to the 1992 Soviet Top League
4	(Russian Soviet Federative Socialist Republic) Rostselmash Rostov-on-Don	42	20	10	12	47	39	+8	50	Promoted to the 1992 Soviet Top League
5	(Ukrainian Soviet Socialist Republic) Bukovyna Chernivtsi	42	20	8	14	56	49	+7	48	Withdrew
6	(Ukrainian Soviet Socialist Republic) Tavriya Simferopol	42	19	10	13	64	56	+8	48	Withdrew
7	(Uzbek Soviet Socialist Republic) Neftiannik Fergona	42	21	5	16	54	56	−2	47	Promoted to the 1992 Soviet Top League
8	(Russian Soviet Federative Socialist Republic) Lokomotiv Nizhniy Novgorod	42	17	13	12	46	35	+11	47	Promoted to the 1992 Soviet Top League
9	(Uzbek Soviet Socialist Republic) Novbahor	42	19	7	16	60	53	+7	45	Promoted to the 1992 Soviet Top League
10	(Georgian Soviet Socialist Republic) Dinamo Sukhumi	42	16	11	15	50	50	0	43	Promoted to the 1992 Soviet Top League
11	(Russian Soviet Federative Socialist Republic) Textilschik Kamyshin	42	15	13	14	56	52	+4	43	
12	(Russian Soviet Federative Socialist Republic) Shinnik Yaroslavl	42	17	7	18	57	59	−2	41	
13	(Russian Soviet Federative Socialist Republic) Fakel Voronezh	42	17	7	18	45	50	−5	41	
14	(Kazakh Soviet Socialist Republic) Kairat Almaty	42	17	6	19	58	52	+6	40	Promoted to the 1992 Soviet Top League
15	(Azerbaijan Soviet Socialist Republic) Neftchi Baku	42	17	5	20	60	58	+2	39	Promoted to the 1992 Soviet Top League
16	(Russian Soviet Federative Socialist Republic) Dinamo Stavropol	42	14	11	17	50	54	−4	39	
17	(Armenian Soviet Socialist Republic) Kotayk Abovyan	42	15	7	20	30	48	−18	37	Withdrew
18	(Russian Soviet Federative Socialist Republic) Zenit St. Petersburg/Leningrad	42	11	14	17	44	50	−6	36	Promoted to the 1992 Soviet Top League
19	(Moldavian Soviet Socialist Republic) Zimbru Chisinau	42	11	13	18	36	49	−13	35	
20	(Russian Soviet Federative Socialist Republic) Geolog Tyumen	42	11	13	18	32	47	−15	35	
21	(Russian Soviet Federative Socialist Republic) Kuban Krasnodar	42	8	10	24	40	68	−28	26	
22	(Latvian Soviet Socialist Republic) Pardaugava Riga	42	7	6	29	31	73	−42	20	Withdrew

(C) Champions

Notes:

- On 6 September 1991, the city of Leningrad was renamed into Saint Petersburg
- On 4 September 1991, the city of Sverdlovsk was renamed into Yekaterinburg

=== Second League ===
==== West ====
Pos	Republic (Note: Numerous clubs refused to play away games in Azerbaijan due to the First Nagorno-Karabakh War (Operation Ring).)	Team	Pld	W	D	L	GF	GA	GD	Pts
1	(Ukrainian Soviet Socialist Republic) Ukraine	Karpaty Lviv	42	24	11	7	47	27	+20	59
2	(Ukrainian Soviet Socialist Republic) Ukraine	Zorya Luhansk (Note: Teams that refused to play against Goyazan Kazakh only: Zarya Luhansk and Niva Vinnitsa.)	42	26	5	11	69	34	+35	57
3	(Azerbaijan Soviet Socialist Republic) Azerbaijan	Dinamo Gandzha	42	26	4	12	48	48	0	56 (Note: All Azerbaijani clubs received multiple technical wins such: Dinamo Gandzha: 10 technical wins; +20 points; Karabakh Agdam: 11 technical wins; +22 points; Goyazan Kazakh: 4 technical wins; +8 points)
4	(Ukrainian Soviet Socialist Republic) Ukraine	Nyva Ternopil (Note: Teams that refused to play against Dinamo Gandzha and Karabakh Agdam: Nyva Ternopil, Volyn Lutsk, Tigina-Apoel Bendery, SKA Odesa, Dnepr Mogilev, Kremen Kremenchug, Sudnostroitel Nikolayev, Dinamo Brest, KIM Vitebsk, and Khimik Grodno.)	42	25	6	11	56	29	+27	56
5	(Ukrainian Soviet Socialist Republic) Ukraine	Nyva Vinnytsia	42	21	7	14	54	40	+14	49
6	(Russian Soviet Federative Socialist Republic) Russia (1W)	Torpedo Taganrog	42	19	9	14	46	30	+16	47
7	(Ukrainian Soviet Socialist Republic) Ukraine	Torpedo Zaporizhzhia	42	18	10	14	63	50	+13	46
8	(Ukrainian Soviet Socialist Republic) Ukraine	Volyn Lutsk	42	19	7	16	46	33	+13	45
9	(Moldavian Soviet Socialist Republic) Moldova	Tigina-Apoel Bendery	42	18	8	16	49	39	+10	44
10	(Ukrainian Soviet Socialist Republic) Ukraine	SKA Odesa	42	18	7	17	46	42	+4	43
11	(Azerbaijan Soviet Socialist Republic) Azerbaijan	Karabakh Agdam	42	20	2	20	20	47	−27	42
12	(Byelorussian Soviet Socialist Republic) Belarus	Dnepr Mogilev (Note: Teams that refused to play against all Azerbaijani clubs: Dnepr Mogilev and KIM Vitebsk.)	42	18	6	18	47	37	+10	42
13	(Ukrainian Soviet Socialist Republic) Ukraine	Kremin Kremenchuk	42	16	9	17	56	50	+6	41
14	(Moldavian Soviet Socialist Republic) Moldova	Zaria Beltsy	42	16	7	19	63	82	−19	39
15	(Ukrainian Soviet Socialist Republic) Ukraine	Sudnobudivnyk Mykolaiv	42	15	8	19	61	55	+6	38
16	(Byelorussian Soviet Socialist Republic) Belarus	Dinamo Brest	42	14	9	19	50	50	0	37
17	(Russian Soviet Federative Socialist Republic) Russia (1W)	Spartak Nalchik	42	15	6	21	51	67	−16	36
18	(Ukrainian Soviet Socialist Republic) Ukraine(1)	Halychyna Drohobych	42	14	7	21	42	66	−24	35
19	(Ukrainian Soviet Socialist Republic) Ukraine(1)	Vorskla Poltava	42	10	11	21	39	60	−21	31
20	(Byelorussian Soviet Socialist Republic) Belarus	KIM Vitebsk	42	11	8	23	43	55	−12	30
21	(Azerbaijan Soviet Socialist Republic) Azerbaijan	Goyazan Kazakh	42	13	2	27	29	61	−32	28
22	(Byelorussian Soviet Socialist Republic) Belarus	Khimik Grodno	42	7	9	26	32	55	−23	23

Notes:

Representation

- Ukrainian SSR: 11
- Byelorussian SSR: 4
- Moldavian SSR 2
- Russian SFSR 2
- Azerbaijan SSR 3

==== Center ====
Pos	Republic (Note: Several clubs refused to play away games in Armenia due to the First Nagorno-Karabakh War (Operation Ring). Both Armenian clubs received multiple technical wins such Lori Kirovakan 4 technical wins, Ararat-2 Yerevan - 3.: Teams that refused to play against Armenian clubs: Metallurg Lipetsk, KamAZ Naberezhnye Chelny, and Dinamo Bryansk.)	Team	Pld	W	D	L	GF	GA	GD	Pts
1	(Russian Soviet Federative Socialist Republic) Russia	Asmaral Moscow (C)	42	24	14	4	86	32	+54	62
2	(Russian Soviet Federative Socialist Republic) Russia	KSS	42	26	8	8	83	41	+42	60
3	(Russian Soviet Federative Socialist Republic) Russia (1W)	Torpedo Vladimir	42	26	5	11	79	40	+39	57
4	(Russian Soviet Federative Socialist Republic) Russia (1W)	Metallurg Lipetsk	42	21	7	14	61	47	+14	49
5	(Russian Soviet Federative Socialist Republic) Russia (1W)	Terek Grozny	42	19	11	12	55	40	+15	49
6	(Russian Soviet Federative Socialist Republic) Russia (1C)	Lada Togliatti (Note: Lada Togliatti did not arrive for the away game against Lori Kirovakan.)	42	18	8	16	63	61	+2	44
7	(Russian Soviet Federative Socialist Republic) Russia (1C)	Torpedo Volzhsky	42	17	10	15	55	54	+1	44
8	(Russian Soviet Federative Socialist Republic) Russia (1C)	Sokol Saratov	42	19	4	19	72	74	−2	42
9	(Russian Soviet Federative Socialist Republic) Russia (1C)	Zenit Izhevsk	42	17	8	17	67	45	+22	42
10	(Russian Soviet Federative Socialist Republic) Russia (1C)	KAMAZ	42	19	3	20	60	55	+5	41
11	(Russian Soviet Federative Socialist Republic) Russia (2)	Dynamo Briansk	42	18	5	19	47	50	−3	41
12	(Russian Soviet Federative Socialist Republic) Russia (1C)	Torpedo Riazan	42	17	7	18	51	50	+1	41
13	(Russian Soviet Federative Socialist Republic) Russia (1W)	Cement Novorossiysk	42	16	8	18	70	56	+14	40
14	(Russian Soviet Federative Socialist Republic) Russia (1C)	Zvezda Perm	42	14	12	16	58	53	+5	40
15	(Russian Soviet Federative Socialist Republic) Russia (1W)	Druzhba Maikop	42	15	8	19	58	59	−1	38
16	(Russian Soviet Federative Socialist Republic) Russia (1W)	APK Azov	42	14	9	19	36	52	−16	37
17	(Russian Soviet Federative Socialist Republic) Russia (1W)	Nart Cherkessk	42	13	11	18	45	50	−5	37
18	(Russian Soviet Federative Socialist Republic) Russia (1C)	Gastello Ufa	42	13	8	21	43	69	−26	34
19	(Russian Soviet Federative Socialist Republic) Russia (2)	Start Ulyanovsk	42	12	10	20	36	57	−21	34
20	(Russian Soviet Federative Socialist Republic) Russia (1W)	Volga Tver	42	14	5	23	35	66	−31	33
21	(Armenian Soviet Socialist Republic)	Ararat-2 Yerevan	42	14	2	26	37	80	−43	30
22	(Armenian Soviet Socialist Republic) Armenia	Lori Kirovakan	42	12	5	25	32	98	−66	29

(C) Champions

==== East ====
Pos	Republic	Team	Pld	W	D	L	GF	GA	GD	Pts
1	(Russian Soviet Federative Socialist Republic) Russia	Okean Nakhodka	42	27	7	8	68	33	+35	61
2	(Turkmen Soviet Socialist Republic) Turkmenistan	Kopetdag Ashkhabat	42	25	8	9	89	36	+53	58
3	(Kirghiz Soviet Socialist Republic) Kyrgyzstan	Alga Bishkek (Note: Capital city of the Kyrgyz SSR Frunze was renamed into Bishkek.)	42	21	12	9	60	31	+29	54
4	(Uzbek Soviet Socialist Republic) Uzbekistan	Nurafshon Bukhara	42	20	9	13	72	45	+27	49
5	(Kazakh Soviet Socialist Republic) Kazakhstan	Vostok Ust-Kamenogorsk	42	19	9	14	69	62	+7	47
6	(Russian Soviet Federative Socialist Republic) Russia (1E)	Zvezda Irkutsk	42	20	5	17	62	45	+17	45
7	(Russian Soviet Federative Socialist Republic) Russia (1E)	Kuzbass Kemerevo	42	19	6	17	58	61	−3	44
8	(Kazakh Soviet Socialist Republic) Kazakhstan	Tselinnik Tselinograd	42	19	6	17	44	51	−7	44
9	(Kazakh Soviet Socialist Republic) Kazakhstan	Traktor Pavlodar	42	19	5	18	54	50	+4	43
10	(Kazakh Soviet Socialist Republic) Kazakhstan	Shakhter Karaganda	42	18	7	17	48	42	+6	43
11	(Kazakh Soviet Socialist Republic) Kazakhstan	Khimik Dzhambul	42	17	9	16	56	47	+9	43
12	(Kazakh Soviet Socialist Republic) Kazakhstan	Meliorator Chimkent	42	17	9	16	44	37	+7	43
13	(Russian Soviet Federative Socialist Republic) Russia (1E)	Amur Blagoveschensk	42	16	11	15	51	53	−2	43
14	(Uzbek Soviet Socialist Republic) Uzbekistan	Avtomobilist Kokand	42	19	4	19	67	71	−4	42
15	(Russian Soviet Federative Socialist Republic) Russia (1E)	Dynamo Barnaul	42	15	12	15	60	64	−4	42
16	(Uzbek Soviet Socialist Republic) Uzbekistan	Sogdiana Dzhizak	42	18	5	19	56	55	+1	41
17	(Uzbek Soviet Socialist Republic) Uzbekistan	Kasansayets Kasansai	42	17	6	19	69	66	+3	40
18	(Kazakh Soviet Socialist Republic) Kazakhstan	Ekibastuzets Ekibastuz	42	14	9	19	49	63	−14	37
19	(Russian Soviet Federative Socialist Republic) Russia (1E)	Sakhalin Yuzhno-Sakhalinsk	42	12	10	20	37	59	−22	34
20	(Uzbek Soviet Socialist Republic) Uzbekistan	Surkhan Termez	42	12	3	27	37	65	−28	27
21	(Kazakh Soviet Socialist Republic) Kazakhstan	Zhetysu Taldy‑Kurgan	42	9	6	27	44	96	−52	24
22	(Tajik Soviet Socialist Republic) Tajikistan	Vakhsh Kurgan‑Tyube	42	7	6	29	36	98	−62	20

Notes:

Representation

- Kazakh SSR: 8
- Russian SFSR: 6
- Uzbek SSR: 5
- Kyrgyz SSR: 1
- Turkmen SSR: 1
- Tajik SSR: 1

=== Lower Second League ===
==== Group 1 ====
Pos	Team	Pld	W	D	L	GF	GA	GD	Pts	Promotion or relegation
1	Naftovyk Okhtyrka (C, P)	50	29	17	4	87	34	+53	75	Promoted
2	Prykarpattia Ivano-Frankivsk (P)	50	31	9	10	86	43	+43	71	Promoted
3	Kolos Nikopol	50	28	13	9	86	45	+41	69	
4	Veres Rivne	50	28	13	9	67	38	+29	69	
5	Pryladyst Mukachevo	50	24	14	12	67	42	+25	62	
6	Krystal Kherson	50	23	15	12	82	60	+22	61	
7	Dynamo Bila Tserkva	50	25	9	16	69	50	+19	59	
8	Avtomobilist Sumy	50	20	14	16	51	40	+11	54	
9	Temp Shepetivka (P)	50	19	15	16	64	53	+11	53	Promoted
10	Polissya Zhytomyr	50	22	7	21	64	66	−2	51	
11	Kryvbas Kryvyi Rih	50	19	13	18	75	64	+11	51	
12	Shakhtar Pavlohrad	50	19	12	19	84	66	+18	50	
13	Desna Chernihiv	50	20	9	21	59	59	0	49	
14	Podillya Khmelnytskyi	50	18	13	19	54	55	−1	49	
15	Zakarpattia Uzhhorod	50	20	8	22	59	64	−5	48	
16	Karpaty Kamyanka-Buzka	50	15	15	20	48	55	−7	45	
17	Stal Kommunarsk	50	15	15	20	58	73	−15	45	
18	Dnipro Cherkasy	50	17	10	23	47	59	−12	44	
19	Khimik Sievierodonetsk	50	15	13	22	52	70	−18	43	
20	Vahonobudivnyk Stakhanov	50	17	8	25	56	75	−19	42	
21	SKA Kyiv	50	11	20	19	48	60	−12	42	
22	Chaika Sevastopol	50	13	15	22	58	77	−19	41	
23	Mayak Ochakiv	50	15	10	25	51	76	−25	40	
24	Okean Kerch (R)	50	15	10	25	49	72	−23	40	Relegated
25	Zirka Kirovohrad (R)	50	12	13	25	55	90	−35	37	Relegated
26	Mayak Kharkiv (R)	50	0	10	40	31	121	−90	10	Relegated

(C) Champions; (P) Promoted; (R) Relegated

==== Group 2 ====
Pos	Team (Note: The Zone included clubs from Nagorno-Karabakh, Azerbaijan.)	Pld	W	D	L	GF	GA	GD	Pts
1	Syunik Kapan (Note: Kapan changed name to Syunik Kapan.) (C)	38	32	2	4	107	40	+67	66
2	Shirak Gyumri (Note: Leninakan City were renamed as Gyumri.)	38	30	4	4	112	24	+88	64
3	Artsakh Stepanakert	38	26	5	7	98	45	+53	57
4	Spitak	38	25	3	10	112	61	+51	53
5	Araks Hoktemberyan	38	23	4	11	78	63	+15	50
6	Koshkagorts Yerevan	38	20	2	16	84	67	+17	42
7	Malatia Yerevan	38	16	8	14	59	54	+5	40
8	Yerazank Stepanakert	38	17	4	17	67	67	0	38
9	FIMA Yerevan	38	17	3	18	58	64	−6	37
10	Pahatsoyagorts Noyemberyan	38	15	5	18	51	64	−13	35
11	Zvartnots Echmiadzin	38	14	4	20	59	76	−17	32
12	Impuls Dilijan	38	12	7	19	60	81	−21	31
13	Zoravan Yegvard	38	12	7	19	61	70	−9	31
14	Zangezur Goris	38	12	5	21	52	81	−29	29
15	Nairi Yerevan	38	10	9	19	60	80	−20	29
16	Moush Charentsavan	38	10	9	19	47	76	−29	29
17	Alashkert Martuni	38	12	4	22	51	79	−28	28
18	Nig Aparan	38	10	6	22	46	67	−21	26
19	Kasakh Ashtarak	38	8	10	20	35	71	−36	26
20	Almast Yerevan	38	7	3	28	36	103	−67	17

(C) Champions

==== Group 3 ====
Pos	Team	Pld	W	D	L	GF	GA	GD	Pts	
1	Khazar Sumgait	38	28	5	5	112	24	+88	61	
2	Stroitel Baku	38	22	10	6	82	32	+50	54	
3	Avtomobilist Yevlakh	38	21	10	7	76	28	+48	52	
4	Pambigchi Barda	38	22	7	9	60	34	+26	51	
5	Kyur Mingechaur	38	18	11	9	67	33	+34	47	
6	Araz Baku	38	16	14	8	48	33	+15	46	
7	FC Gyanjlik Navagi	38	18	7	13	61	47	+14	43	
8	FC Dashgin Zakatali	38	20	2	16	69	63	+6	42	
9	FC Avey Akstafa	38	18	4	16	48	42	+6	40	[+]
10	FC Vilyash Massali	38	14	10	14	54	53	+1	38	
11	FC Khazar Lenkoran	38	17	3	18	45	54	−9	37	
12	FC Shahdag Kusari	38	15	7	16	52	57	−5	37	
13	FC Agrofirma Kuba (Note: Shahdag Kuba changed name to Agrofirma.)	38	15	7	16	44	53	−9	37	
14	FC Inshaatchi Shemaha	38	14	6	18	49	59	−10	34	
15	FC Azeri Baku	38	12	10	16	51	54	−3	34	[+]
16	FC Stroitel Sabirabad	38	14	4	20	37	69	−32	32	
17	FC MCOP-Dinamo Baku	38	10	10	18	35	41	−6	30	
18	FC Shirvan Kyurdamir	38	10	6	22	33	86	−53	26	
19	FC Plastik Salyani	38	3	6	29	24	98	−74	12	
20	FC Badamli Nahichevan (Note: Araz Nahichevan changed name to Badamli.)	38	2	3	33	20	107	−87	7	

==== Group 4 ====
Pos	Team	Pld	W	D	L	GF	GA	GD	Pts	
1	Zhemchuzhina Sochi	42	27	10	5	91	33	+58	64	[+] [RUS 1W]
2	Uralan Elista	42	26	5	11	62	44	+18	57	[RUS 1W]
3	Asmaral Kislovodsk	42	25	3	14	67	46	+21	53	[+] [RUS 1W]
4	Etalon Baksan	42	23	6	13	64	38	+26	52	[+] [RUS 2]
5	Atommash Volgodonsk	42	20	11	11	59	38	+21	51	[RUS 1C]
6	Khimik Belorechensk	42	21	8	13	73	45	+28	50	[RUS 2]
7	FC Signal Izobilny	42	18	12	12	54	47	+7	48	[RUS 2]
8	FC Dinamo Makhachkala	42	23	1	18	82	62	+20	47	
9	FC Zvezda Gorodishche	42	20	6	16	70	47	+23	46	[RUS 2]
10	FC SKA Rostov-na-Donu	42	19	8	15	62	40	+22	46	[-] [RUS 2]
11	FC Volgar Astrakhan	42	19	7	16	62	50	+12	45	[-] [RUS 2]
12	FC Mashuk Pyatigorsk	42	16	12	14	56	40	+16	44	[-] [RUS 2]
13	FC Avtodor Vladikavkaz	42	18	6	18	60	63	−3	42	[RUS 2]
14	FC Druzhba Budyonnovsk	42	16	10	16	59	57	+2	42	[+] [RUS 2]
15	FC Lokomotiv Mineralnyye Vody	42	15	10	17	51	61	−10	40	[RUS 2]
16	FC Torpedo Armavir	42	15	8	19	46	56	−10	38	[RUS 2]
17	FC Vaynah Shali	42	13	6	23	46	80	−34	32	[+] [RUS 2]
18	FC Remontnik Prokhladny	42	11	10	21	49	71	−22	32	[RUS 2]
19	FC Kuban Timashevsk	42	10	9	23	34	69	−35	29	[+]
20	FC Sherstyanik Nevinnomyssk	42	11	4	27	39	70	−31	26	[+] [RUS 2]
21	FC Kaspiy Kaspiysk	42	6	10	26	32	98	−66	22	[+] [RUS 2]
22	FC Dinamo Gagra	42	8	2	32	37	100	−63	18	[+]

==== Group 5 ====
Pos	Team	Pld	W	D	L	GF	GA	GD	Pts	
1	FC Spartak Anapa	42	28	7	7	79	26	+53	63	[RUS 1W]
2	FC Svetotekhnika Saransk	42	25	7	10	76	35	+41	57	[RUS 1C]
3	FC Bujak Komrat	42	21	11	10	58	43	+15	53	[+] [MDA]
4	FC Energomash Belgorod (Note: Salyut Belgorod changed name to Energomash.)	42	22	8	12	68	38	+30	52	[RUS 1W]
5	FC Zarya Kaluga	42	21	8	13	67	47	+20	50	[-]
6	FC Rhythm Belgorod	42	21	8	13	58	47	+11	50	[+] [RUS 2]
7	FC Kuban Barannikovskiy	42	19	11	12	63	41	+22	49	[RUS 2]
8	FC Avangard Kursk	42	22	4	16	56	48	+8	48	[RUS 2]
9	FC Shakhtyor Shakhty	42	20	8	14	78	65	+13	48	[RUS 2]
10	FC Start Yeisk	42	18	10	14	61	46	+15	46	[RUS 2]
11	FC Oka Kolomna	42	15	16	11	61	47	+14	46	[RUS 2]
12	FC Arsenal Tula	42	19	7	16	54	41	+13	45	[RUS 2]
13	FC Spartak Tambov	42	19	7	16	57	49	+8	45	[RUS 2]
14	FC Khimik Dzerzhinsk	42	14	11	17	46	53	−7	39	[RUS 2]
15	FC Rus Volgograd	42	16	6	20	43	71	−28	38	[+]
16	FC Buran Voronezh	42	14	9	19	45	43	+2	37	
17	FC Avangard Kamyshin	42	13	10	19	50	62	−12	36	[+] [RUS 2]
18	FC Spartak Oryol	42	13	9	20	56	61	−5	35	[RUS 2]
19	FC Torpedo Mytishchi	42	13	7	22	48	65	−17	33	[+] [RUS 2]
20	FC Torgmash Lyubertsy	42	8	6	28	42	92	−50	22	[RUS 2]
21	FC Metallurg Krasny Sulin	42	8	4	30	25	81	−56	20	[+] [RUS 2]
22	FC Niva Slavyansk-na-Kubani	42	5	2	35	30	120	−90	12	[RUS 2]

==== Group 6 ====
Pos	Team	Pld	W	D	L	GF	GA	GD	Pts	
1	FC Prometheus-Dinamo S-Peterburg	42	29	7	6	72	25	+47	65	[RUS 1W]
2	FC Textilshchik Ivanovo	42	28	6	8	69	36	+33	64 (Note: 2 bonus points?)	[RUS 1W]
3	FC RAF Jelgava	42	28	6	8	71	39	+32	62	[LVA]
4	FC Dinamo Vologda	42	26	10	6	75	38	+37	62	[RUS 1W]
5	FC Baltika Kaliningrad	42	24	9	9	72	45	+27	57	[-] [RUS 2]
6	FC Volzhanin Kineshma	42	23	11	8	59	30	+29	57	[RUS 2]
7	FC Iskra Smolensk	42	21	10	11	52	35	+17	52	[-] [RUS 2]
8	FC Bulat Cherepovets (Note: Khimik Cherepovets changed name to Bulat.)	42	21	9	12	48	34	+14	51	[RUS 2]
9	FC Mashinostroitel Pskov	42	17	10	15	54	40	+14	44	[RUS 2]
10	FC Prometheus Lyubertsy	42	15	14	13	47	41	+6	44	[+]
11	FC Znamya Truda Orekhovo-Zuyevo	42	16	11	15	46	34	+12	43	[RUS 2]
12	FC Kirovets Sankt-Peterburg	42	13	14	15	36	38	−2	40	[RUS 2]
13	FC Saturn Ramenskoye	42	12	15	15	35	44	−9	39	[RUS 2]
14	FC Progress Chernyakhovsk	42	13	9	20	44	54	−10	35	[+] [RUS 2]
15	FC Spartak Petrozavodsk	42	11	12	19	33	48	−15	34	[RUS 2]
16	FC Gomselmash Gomel	42	13	5	24	40	54	−14	31	[BLR]
17	FC Spartak Kostroma	42	9	13	20	27	57	−30	31	[RUS 2]
18	FC Zvezda Moskva	42	10	9	23	41	71	−30	29	[RUS 2]
19	FC Presnya Moskva	42	8	8	26	28	64	−36	24	[+] [RUS 2]
20	FC Dinamo-2 Moskva	40	7	10	23	37	58	−21	24	[RUS 2]
21	FC Volochanin Vyshniy Volochok	42	7	9	26	22	67	−45	23	[+] [RUS 2]
22	FC CSKA-2 Moskva	42	4	5	33	25	81	−56	13	[RUS 2]

==== Group 7 ====
Pos	Team	Pld	W	D	L	GF	GA	GD	Pts	
1	FC Rubin Kazan	42	30	8	4	79	20	+59	68	[RUS 1C]
2	FC Metallurg Magnitogorsk	42	25	10	7	73	31	+42	60	[RUS 1C]
3	FC Uralets Nizhniy Tagil	42	27	5	10	89	33	+56	59	[RUS 1C]
4	FC Torpedo Miass	42	25	7	10	74	32	+42	57	[RUS 1C]
5	FC Druzhba Yoshkar-Ola	42	24	9	9	70	36	+34	57	[RUS 1C]
6	FC Zenit Chelyabinsk	42	25	6	11	74	45	+29	56	[RUS 1C]
7	FC Dinamo Kirov	42	23	9	10	67	33	+34	55	[RUS 1C]
8	FC Sibir Kurgan (Note: Zauralye Kurgan changed name to Sibir.)	42	20	9	13	46	31	+15	49	[RUS 2]
9	FC Neftekhimik Nizhnekamsk	42	20	6	16	52	36	+16	46	[+] [RUS 2]
10	FC Gazovik Izhevsk	42	19	6	17	58	49	+9	44	[+] [RUS 2]
11	FC Azamat Cheboksary (Note: Stal Cheboksary changed name to Azamat.)	42	18	8	16	62	46	+16	44	[RUS 2]
12	FC Znamya Arzamas	42	16	11	15	56	49	+7	43	[RUS 2]
13	FC Kauchuk Sterlitamak	42	16	7	19	52	70	−18	39	[RUS 2]
14	FC Electron Vyatskiye Polyany	42	13	11	18	40	54	−14	37	[+] [RUS 2]
15	FC Avtopribor Oktyabrskiy	42	13	9	20	38	59	−21	35	[RUS 2]
16	FC Metallurg Novotroitsk	42	14	5	23	45	78	−33	33	[+] [RUS 2]
17	FC Zenit Penza (Note: Granite Penza changed name to Zenit.)	42	12	9	21	50	55	−5	33	[RUS 2]
18	FC Gazovik Orenburg	42	11	10	21	41	74	−33	32	[RUS 2]
19	FC Bashselmash Neftekamsk	42	7	8	27	32	77	−45	22	
20	FC Sokol Sarapul	42	6	10	26	31	79	−48	22	[+]
21	FC Zarya Podgorny	42	5	9	28	20	80	−60	19	[RUS 2]
22	FC EVM Ruzayevka	42	5	4	33	27	109	−82	14	[+]

==== Group 8 ====
Pos	Team	Pld	W	D	L	GF	GA	GD	Pts	
1	FC Aktyubinets Aktyubinsk	36	26	7	3	63	23	+40	59	
2	FC Spartak Semipalatinsk	36	26	6	4	79	22	+57	58	
3	FC Kustanayets Kustanay	36	25	6	5	82	25	+57	56	
4	FC Kaysar Kzil-Orda	36	24	5	7	92	28	+64	53	[-]
5	FC Metallurg Jezkazgan (Note: Jezkazganets Jezkazgan changed name to Metallurg.)	36	22	5	9	66	42	+24	49	
6	FC Gornyak Khromtau	36	21	5	10	74	27	+47	47	
7	FC Alay Osh	36	19	4	13	51	51	0	42	[KGZ]
8	FC Metallist Petropavlovsk	36	16	7	13	57	50	+7	39	
9	FC Bulat Temirtau	36	15	9	12	45	35	+10	39	
10	FC Metallurg Yermak	36	16	4	16	63	59	+4	36	
11	FC Kokshetau Kokchetav (Note: Spartak Kokchetav changed name to Kokshetau.)	36	14	8	14	45	50	−5	36	
12	FC Montazhnik Turkestan	36	11	7	18	53	72	−19	29	
13	FC Arman Kentau	36	11	5	20	53	77	−24	27	[+]
14	FC Dostuk Sokuluk	36	10	6	20	31	52	−21	26	[KGZ]
15	FC Aktau (Note: Shevchenko City were renamed as Aktau.)	36	9	6	21	42	72	−30	24	
16	FC Olimpia Alma-Ata (Note: SKIF Alma-Ata changed name to Olimpia.)	36	8	7	21	42	74	−32	23	
17	FC Uralets Uralsk	36	8	2	26	39	71	−32	18	
18	FC Hosilot Farhor	36	5	4	27	27	105	−78	14	[+] [TJK]
19	FC Ak-Kanat Uzun-Agach	36	4	1	31	28	97	−69	9	

==== Group 9 ====
Pos	Team	Pld	W	D	L	GF	GA	GD	Pts	
1	Traktor Tashkent	50	33	9	8	103	43	+60	75	[UZB]
2	Umid Tashkent	50	29	11	10	93	51	+42	69	[+] [UZB]
3	Khujand (Note: Leninabad City were renamed as Hujand.)	50	27	13	10	108	53	+55	67	[TJK]
4	Chirchik	50	27	7	16	92	64	+28	61	[UZB]
5	Zarafshan Navoi	50	26	9	15	67	44	+23	61	[-] [UZB]
6	Kimegar Almalyk (Note: Metallurg Almalyk changed name to Kimegar.)	50	25	10	15	96	61	+35	60	[UZB]
7	Shahrihonchi Shahrihan	50	25	9	16	106	71	+35	59	[+] [UZB]
8	Marokand Samarkand (Note: Dinamo Samarkand changed name to Marokand.)	50	25	8	17	92	69	+23	58	[UZB]
9	FC Regar Tursun-Zade	50	26	5	19	74	72	+2	57	[TJK]
10	FC Nebitchi Nebit-Dag	50	25	7	18	83	54	+29	57	[TKM]
11	FC Aral Nukus	50	24	6	20	68	64	+4	54	[UZB]
12	FC Bagdodchi Bagdad	50	23	8	19	81	83	−2	54	[+] [UZB]
13	FC Navruz Andizhan (Note: Spartak Andizhan changed name to Navruz.)	50	22	10	18	76	61	+15	54	[-] [UZB]
14	FC Ahal Akdashayak	50	24	4	22	75	69	+6	52	[TKM]
15	FC Yangiyer	50	20	10	20	77	72	+5	50	[UZB]
16	FC Yeshlik Turakurgan	50	22	4	24	86	84	+2	48	[UZB]
17	FC Sokhibkor Khalkabad	50	19	10	21	65	73	−8	48	[UZB]
18	FC Sverdlovets Tashkent Region	50	17	14	19	75	72	+3	48	[UZB]
19	FC Merv Mary	50	17	7	26	59	81	−22	41	[TKM]
20	FC Geolog Karshi	50	15	8	27	58	91	−33	38	[UZB]
21	FC Gulistonchi Gulistan	50	13	10	27	42	89	−47	36	[+] [UZB]
22	FC Binokor Bukhara	50	15	5	30	34	85	−51	35	[+] [UZB]
23	FC Turtkulchi Turtkul (Note: Tselinnik Turtkul changed name to Turtkulchi.)	50	13	8	29	61	89	−28	34	[UZB]
24	FC Naryn Khakkulabad	50	10	13	27	43	80	−37	33	[+] [UZB]
25	FC Konchi Angren (Note: Shakhtyor Angren changed name to Konchi.)	50	11	7	32	53	97	−44	29	[UZB]
26	FC Kuruvchi Urgench (Note: Jeyhun Urgench changed name to Kuruvchi.)	50	7	8	35	36	131	−95	22	[UZB]

==== Group 10 ====
Pos	Team	Pld	W	D	L	GF	GA	GD	Pts	
1	Lokomotiv Chita	34	21	10	3	46	12	+34	52	[RUS 1E]
2	SKA Khabarovsk	34	23	3	8	58	22	+36	49	[RUS 1E]
3	Irtysh Omsk	34	20	7	7	51	21	+30	47	[-] [RUS 1E]
4	Chkalovets Novosibirsk	34	19	8	7	60	31	+29	46	[RUS 1E]
5	Metallurg Novokuznetsk	34	19	6	9	51	34	+17	44	[RUS 1E]
6	Tom Tomsk	34	16	9	9	43	29	+14	41	[RUS 1E]
7	Metallurg Krasnoyarsk (Note: Avtomobilist Krasnoyarsk changed name to Metallurg.)	34	16	8	10	51	31	+20	40	[RUS 1E]
8	Luch Vladivostok	34	15	10	9	37	28	+9	40	[RUS 1E]
9	Vulkan Petropavlovsk-Kamchatskiy	34	12	9	13	36	39	−3	33	
10	Dinamo Yakutsk	34	12	9	13	28	38	−10	33	[+] [RUS 1E]
11	Amur Komsomolsk-na-Amure	34	8	12	14	32	38	−6	28	[RUS 1E]
12	Selenga Ulan-Ude	34	10	7	17	33	45	−12	27	[RUS 1E]
13	Dinamo Kemerovo	34	8	10	16	18	31	−13	26	[+] [RUS 2]
14	Angara Angarsk	34	8	7	19	29	49	−20	23	[RUS 2]
15	Torpedo Rubtsovsk	34	8	7	19	38	59	−21	23	[RUS 2]
16	Shakhtyor Artyom	34	8	5	21	27	58	−31	21	[+] [RUS 2]
17	Shakhtyor Leninsk-Kuznetskiy	34	8	5	21	24	56	−32	21	[RUS 2]
18	Progress Biysk	34	5	8	21	19	60	−41	18	[RUS 2]

=== Top goalscorers ===
Top League

- Igor Kolyvanov (Dinamo Moscow) – 18 goals

First League

- Serhiy Husyev (Tiligul Tiraspol) – 25 goals

== Soviet Union women's football championship ==
=== Top League. Final stage ===
The final stage included winners and runners-up from both groups of the Top League. All matches took place in Sevastopol.

Semi-finals
Tekstilschik Ramenskoye	1
Arena Kiev	0
Nadezhda Mogilev	0 (2)
SKIF Malakhovka	0 (0)

Final
(gold) Tekstilschik Ramenskoye	0 (6)
(silver) Nadezhda Mogilev	0 (5)
Third place
(bronze) SKIF Malakhovka	1
Arena Kiev	0

=== First League. Final stage ===
The final stage included all winners of the four groups. All three matches took place in Voronezh.

Pos	Republic	Team	Pld	W	D	L	GF	GA	GD	Pts	Qualification
1	Russian SFSR	Energiya Voronezh	2	2	0	0	5	1	+4	4	[RUSSIA]
2	Russian SFSR	Spartak-13 Moscow	2	1	0	1	3	3	0	2	[RUSSIA]
3	Russian SFSR	CSKA-Transexpo Moscow	2	0	0	2	0	4	−4	0	[RUSSIA]
4	Kyrgyz SSR	Azaliya Kant	0	0	0	0	0	0	0	0	Withdrew / no show

=== Second League. Final stage ===
The final stage included all winners of the three groups. The two matches that took place all were in Moscow.

Pos	Team	Pld	W	D	L	GF	GA	GD	Pts	
1	Rus Moscow	2	2	0	0	2	0	+2	4	
2	Syuyumbike Zelenodolsk	2	0	0	2	0	2	−2	0	
3	Kaluzhanka Kaluga	0	0	0	0	0	0	0	0	no show
