= 1991 Soviet First League =

Soviet First League
- Season: 1991
- Champions: Rotor Volgograd
- Relegated: none
- Top goalscorer: (25) Serhiy Husyev (Tiligul Tiraspol)

Soviet First League 1991 was the last season of the Soviet First League. With the collapse of the Soviet Union the football structure was reformed. All of its participants have entered the Top Divisions of the republics of their origin, except of Dinamo Sukhumi that because of the 1992-93 War in Abkhazia was dissolved.

Due to the 1991 Soviet coup d'état attempt, a process of dissolution of the Soviet Union accelerated as well as a process of decommunization in former union republics. Number of cities changed their names returning to their original names.

== Teams ==
=== Promoted teams ===
- FC Uralmash Sverdlovsk – Winner of the 1990 Soviet Second League, Zone Center (returning after an absence of 10 seasons)
- FC Bukovina Chernovtsy – Winner of the 1990 Soviet Second League, Zone West (debut)
- FC Neftianik Fergona – Winner of the 1990 Soviet Second League, Zone East (debut)
- FC Novbakhor Namangan – Runner-up of the 1990 Soviet Second League, Zone East (debut)
- FC Textilshchik Kamyshin – Runner-up of the 1990 Soviet Second League, Zone Center (debut)
- FC Daugava Riga – Runner-up of the 1990 Soviet Second League, Zone West (debut)

=== Relegated teams ===
- Rotor Volgograd – (Returning after 2 seasons)

=== Renamed teams ===
- Prior to the start of the season Tiras Tiraspol was renamed to Tiligul Tiraspol.
- Prior to the start of the season Nistru Kishenev was renamed to Zimbrul Kishinev.

=== Replaced or withdrawn teams ===
With fall of the Soviet Union, the promoted FC Daugava Riga was dissolved and replaced with FC Pardaugava Riga that was based on the junior squad of the Latvia national U-21 football team and took part in the 1990 Baltic League placing only 15th out 17 teams.

=== Locations ===
Location of teams in the 1991 Soviet First League.

== League standings ==
Pos	Team	Pld	W	D	L	GF	GA	GD	Pts	Qualification or relegation
1	(Russian Soviet Federative Socialist Republic) Rotor Volgograd (C)	42	24	11	7	79	44	+35	59	Promoted to the 1992 Soviet Top League
2	(Moldavian Soviet Socialist Republic) Tiligul Tiraspol	42	22	10	10	64	45	+19	54	Promoted to the 1992 Soviet Top League
3	(Russian Soviet Federative Socialist Republic) Uralmash Yekaterinburg/Sverdlovsk	42	21	9	12	68	40	+28	51	Promoted to the 1992 Soviet Top League
4	(Russian Soviet Federative Socialist Republic) Rostselmash Rostov-on-Don	42	20	10	12	47	39	+8	50	Promoted to the 1992 Soviet Top League
5	(Ukrainian Soviet Socialist Republic) Bukovyna Chernivtsi	42	20	8	14	56	49	+7	48	Withdrew
6	(Ukrainian Soviet Socialist Republic) Tavriya Simferopol	42	19	10	13	64	56	+8	48	Withdrew
7	(Uzbek Soviet Socialist Republic) Neftiannik Fergona	42	21	5	16	54	56	−2	47	Promoted to the 1992 Soviet Top League
8	(Russian Soviet Federative Socialist Republic) Lokomotiv Nizhniy Novgorod	42	17	13	12	46	35	+11	47	Promoted to the 1992 Soviet Top League
9	(Uzbek Soviet Socialist Republic) Novbahor	42	19	7	16	60	53	+7	45	Promoted to the 1992 Soviet Top League
10	(Georgian Soviet Socialist Republic) Dinamo Sukhumi	42	16	11	15	50	50	0	43	Promoted to the 1992 Soviet Top League
11	(Russian Soviet Federative Socialist Republic) Textilschik Kamyshin	42	15	13	14	56	52	+4	43	
12	(Russian Soviet Federative Socialist Republic) Shinnik Yaroslavl	42	17	7	18	57	59	−2	41	
13	(Russian Soviet Federative Socialist Republic) Fakel Voronezh	42	17	7	18	45	50	−5	41	
14	(Kazakh Soviet Socialist Republic) Kairat Almaty	42	17	6	19	58	52	+6	40	Promoted to the 1992 Soviet Top League
15	(Azerbaijan Soviet Socialist Republic) Neftchi Baku	42	17	5	20	60	58	+2	39	Promoted to the 1992 Soviet Top League
16	(Russian Soviet Federative Socialist Republic) Dinamo Stavropol	42	14	11	17	50	54	−4	39	
17	(Armenian Soviet Socialist Republic) Kotayk Abovyan	42	15	7	20	30	48	−18	37	Withdrew
18	(Russian Soviet Federative Socialist Republic) Zenit St. Petersburg/Leningrad	42	11	14	17	44	50	−6	36	Promoted to the 1992 Soviet Top League
19	(Moldavian Soviet Socialist Republic) Zimbru Chisinau	42	11	13	18	36	49	−13	35	
20	(Russian Soviet Federative Socialist Republic) Geolog Tyumen	42	11	13	18	32	47	−15	35	
21	(Russian Soviet Federative Socialist Republic) Kuban Krasnodar	42	8	10	24	40	68	−28	26	
22	(Latvian Soviet Socialist Republic) Pardaugava Riga	42	7	6	29	31	73	−42	20	Withdrew

(C) Champions

Notes:

- On 6 September 1991, the city of Leningrad was renamed into Saint Petersburg
- On 4 September 1991, the city of Sverdlovsk was renamed into Yekaterinburg

== Number of teams by union republic ==
Rank	Union republic	Number of teams	Club(s)
1	RSFSR	11	Dinamo Stavropol, Fakel Voronezh, Geolog Tyumen, Kuban Krasnodar, Lokomotiv Nizhniy Novgorod, Rostselmash Rostov-na-Donu, Rotor Volgograd, Shinnik Yaroslavl, Tekstilschik Kamyshin, Uralmash Yekaterinburg, Zenit Saint Petersburg
2	Moldavian SSR	2	Tiligul Tiraspol, Zimbru Kishenev
2	Ukrainian SSR	2	Bukovina Chernovtsy, Tavriya Simferopol
2	Uzbek SSR	2	Navbahor Namangan, Neftiannik Fergana
5	Armenian SSR	1	Kotaik Abovian
5	Azerbaijan SSR	1	Neftchi Baku
5	Georgian SSR	1	Dinamo Sukhumi
5	Kazakh SSR	1	Kairat Alma-Ata
5	Latvian SSR	1	Pardaugava Riga

== Top scorers ==
#	Player	Club	Goals	Games
1	Serhiy Husyev	«Tiligul Tiraspol»	25	36
2	Serhiy Shevchenko	«Tavriya Simferopol»	21	40
3	Valeri Shushlyakov	«Uralmash Yekaterinburg»	20	38
4	Vladislav Lemish	«Kuban Krasnodar»	20	42
5	Rustam Zabirov	«Navbahor Namangan»	19	35
6	Yuri Kalitvintsev	«Rotor Volgograd»	18	37
7	Aleksandr Tikhonov	«Rostselmash Rostov»	17	40
8	Yunis Hüseynov	«Neftchi Baku»	16	34
9	Vəli Qasımov	«Neftchi Baku»	16	38
10	Rustem Shaymukhametov	«Textilshchik Kamyshin»	15	38
11	Yuriy Hudymenko	«Rotor Volgograd»	15	39

== Managers ==
Club	Head coach
FC Rotor Volgograd	Leonid Koltun
SC Tiligul Tiraspol	Vladimir Veber
FC Uralmash Sverdlovsk FC Uralmash Yekaterinburg	Korney Shperling (until July) Nikolai Agafonov (from July)
FC Rostselmash Rostov-na-Donu	Enver Yulgushov
FC Bukovina Chernovtsy	Yukhym Shkolnykov
SC Tavriya Simferopol	Anatoliy Zayaev
FC Neftiannik Fergona	Yuriy Sarkisyan
FC Lokomotiv Nizhniy Novgorod	Valeri Ovchinnikov
FC Navbakhor Namangan	Igor Volchok
FC Dinamo Sukhumi	Oleg Dolmatov
FC Tekstilshchik Kamyshin	Sergei Pavlov
FC Shinnik Yaroslavl	Stanislav Vorotilin
FC Fakel Voronezh	Sergei Savchenkov (until June) Fyodor Novikov (from July)
FC Kairat Alma-Ata	Boris Stukalov
FC Neftchi Baku	Ruslan Abdullaev (until April) Kazbek Tuaev (from May)
FC Dinamo Stavropol	Viktor Nosov (until July) Vladimir Kitin (from July, interim)
FC Kotayk Abovyan	Arkady Andreasyan
FC Zenit Saint Petersburg	Yury Morozov
FC Zimbru Kishinev	Ion Caras
FC Geolog Tyumen	Rudolf Atamalyan Serhiy Morozov (from July)
FC Kuban Krasnodar	Vladimir Brazhnikov (until July) Yuri Marushkin (from July)
FK Pārdaugava Riga	Jānis Skredelis

== See also ==
- 1991 Soviet Top League
- 1991 Soviet Second League
- 1991 Soviet Second League B
