= 1991 in Ukrainian football =

1991 in Ukrainian football

← 1990 · (Ukrainian Soviet Socialist Republic) · 1992 →

Men's Domestic Leagues
Div	League (Note: The Soviet Union was a union of 15 union republics including Russia. All union republics were allowed to compete at the Soviet football championship.)	Season (Note: In Soviet leagues; the Ukrainian team ranked highest in the combined league standings)
I	(Soviet Union) Top League	Chornomorets Odesa (4th overall)
II	(Soviet Union) First League	Bukovyna Chernivtsi (5th overall)
III	(Soviet Union) Second League (West)	Karpaty Lviv (Winners)
IV	(Soviet Union) Lower Second League (Zone 1)	Naftovyk Okhtyrka (Winners)
Rep	(Ukrainian Soviet Socialist Republic) KFK championship	Novator Mariupol (Champions)

Women's Domestic Leagues
Div	League	Season
I	(Soviet Union) Top League	Arena Kyiv
II	(Soviet Union) First League	Luys Simferopol / Nika Zaporizhia
III	(Soviet Union) Second League	Yunist-Helios Luhansk

Men's Domestic Cups
Div	Name	Champion	Runner-Up
I	1990–91 Soviet Cup	(Ukrainian teams eliminated)	
I	1991–92 Soviet Cup	(Ukrainian teams withdrew)	
II
III	Cup of the Ukrainian SSR	Veres Rivne	Temp Shepetivka
Rep	Cup of the Ukrainian SSR among KFK	(no competition)	

Women's Domestic Cups
Div	Name	Champion	Runner-Up
I	Soviet Cup	(Ukrainian teams eliminated)	

The 1991 season was the 61st season of competitive football in Ukraine which was a union republic within the Soviet Union. Teams from Ukraine competed in two types of competitions All-Union and republican.

== Domestic leagues ==
=== Men ===
==== Soviet Top League ====
Six Ukrainian teams (Chornomorets Odesa, Dynamo Kyiv, Dnipro Dnipropetrovsk, Shakhtar Donetsk, Metalurh Zaporizhia, and Metalist Kharkiv) play in this league, which also contains six teams from the Russian SFSR and four more from other union republics.

Overall standings

Pos	Team	Pld	W	D	L	GF	GA	GD	Pts	Qualification
1	(Russian Soviet Federative Socialist Republic) CSKA Moscow (C)	30	17	9	4	57	32	+25	43	Qualification for Champions League first round
2	(Russian Soviet Federative Socialist Republic) Spartak Moscow	30	17	7	6	57	30	+27	41	Qualification for Cup Winners' Cup first round
3	(Russian Soviet Federative Socialist Republic) Torpedo Moscow	30	13	10	7	36	20	+16	36	Qualification for UEFA Cup first round
4	(Ukrainian Soviet Socialist Republic) Chornomorets	30	10	16	4	39	24	+15	36	Withdrew from the league
5	(Ukrainian Soviet Socialist Republic) Dynamo Kyiv	30	13	9	8	43	34	+9	35	Withdrew from the league
6	(Russian Soviet Federative Socialist Republic) Dynamo Moscow	30	12	7	11	43	42	+1	31	Qualification for UEFA Cup first round
7	(Armenian Soviet Socialist Republic) Ararat	30	11	7	12	29	36	−7	29	Withdrew from the league
8	(Byelorussian Soviet Socialist Republic) Dinamo Minsk	30	9	11	10	29	31	−2	29	
9	(Ukrainian Soviet Socialist Republic) Dnipro	30	9	10	11	31	36	−5	28	Withdrew from the league
10	(Tajik Soviet Socialist Republic) Pamir Dushanbe	30	7	13	10	28	32	−4	27	
11	(Russian Soviet Federative Socialist Republic) Spartak Vladikavkaz	30	9	8	13	33	41	−8	26	
12	(Ukrainian Soviet Socialist Republic) Shakhtar Donetsk	30	6	14	10	33	41	−8	26	Withdrew from the league
13	(Ukrainian Soviet Socialist Republic) Metalurh Zaporizhzhia	30	9	7	14	27	38	−11	25 (Note: Metallurg received more head-to-head points against Pakhtakor.)	Withdrew from the league
14	(Uzbek Soviet Socialist Republic) Pakhtakor Tashkent	30	9	7	14	37	45	−8	25	
15	(Ukrainian Soviet Socialist Republic) Metalist Kharkiv (Note: Metallist placed last in total wins tie-breaker to Metallurg and Pakhtakor.)	30	8	9	13	32	43	−11	25	Withdrew from the league
16	(Russian Soviet Federative Socialist Republic) Lokomotiv Moscow	30	5	8	17	18	47	−29	18	Avoided relegation

Source: footbook.ru footballfacts.ru
Rules for classification: 1) Total points (If two or more teams have equal points for the first place, the winner is determined by additional single round-robin play-off on condition and place determined by the Federation); 2) Total wins; 3) Head-to-head results (3.1. points 3.2. goal difference 3.3. goal scored); 4) Total goal difference; 5) Total games scored; 6) Draw lots
(C) Champions

==== Soviet First League ====
Two Ukrainian teams (Bukovyna Chernivtsi and Tavriya Simferopol) play in this league, which also contains 11 teams from the Russian SFSR and nine more teams from other union republics.

Overall standings

Pos	Team	Pld	W	D	L	GF	GA	GD	Pts	Qualification or relegation
1	(Russian Soviet Federative Socialist Republic) Rotor Volgograd (C)	42	24	11	7	79	44	+35	59	Promoted to the 1992 Soviet Top League
2	(Moldavian Soviet Socialist Republic) Tiligul Tiraspol	42	22	10	10	64	45	+19	54	Promoted to the 1992 Soviet Top League
3	(Russian Soviet Federative Socialist Republic) Uralmash Yekaterinburg/Sverdlovsk	42	21	9	12	68	40	+28	51	Promoted to the 1992 Soviet Top League
4	(Russian Soviet Federative Socialist Republic) Rostselmash Rostov-on-Don	42	20	10	12	47	39	+8	50	Promoted to the 1992 Soviet Top League
5	(Ukrainian Soviet Socialist Republic) Bukovyna Chernivtsi	42	20	8	14	56	49	+7	48	Withdrew
6	(Ukrainian Soviet Socialist Republic) Tavriya Simferopol	42	19	10	13	64	56	+8	48	Withdrew
7	(Uzbek Soviet Socialist Republic) Neftiannik Fergona	42	21	5	16	54	56	−2	47	Promoted to the 1992 Soviet Top League
8	(Russian Soviet Federative Socialist Republic) Lokomotiv Nizhniy Novgorod	42	17	13	12	46	35	+11	47	Promoted to the 1992 Soviet Top League
9	(Uzbek Soviet Socialist Republic) Novbahor	42	19	7	16	60	53	+7	45	Promoted to the 1992 Soviet Top League
10	(Georgian Soviet Socialist Republic) Dinamo Sukhumi	42	16	11	15	50	50	0	43	Promoted to the 1992 Soviet Top League
11	(Russian Soviet Federative Socialist Republic) Textilschik Kamyshin	42	15	13	14	56	52	+4	43	
12	(Russian Soviet Federative Socialist Republic) Shinnik Yaroslavl	42	17	7	18	57	59	−2	41	
13	(Russian Soviet Federative Socialist Republic) Fakel Voronezh	42	17	7	18	45	50	−5	41	
14	(Kazakh Soviet Socialist Republic) Kairat Almaty	42	17	6	19	58	52	+6	40	Promoted to the 1992 Soviet Top League
15	(Azerbaijan Soviet Socialist Republic) Neftchi Baku	42	17	5	20	60	58	+2	39	Promoted to the 1992 Soviet Top League
16	(Russian Soviet Federative Socialist Republic) Dinamo Stavropol	42	14	11	17	50	54	−4	39	
17	(Armenian Soviet Socialist Republic) Kotayk Abovyan	42	15	7	20	30	48	−18	37	Withdrew
18	(Russian Soviet Federative Socialist Republic) Zenit St. Petersburg/Leningrad	42	11	14	17	44	50	−6	36	Promoted to the 1992 Soviet Top League
19	(Moldavian Soviet Socialist Republic) Zimbru Chisinau	42	11	13	18	36	49	−13	35	
20	(Russian Soviet Federative Socialist Republic) Geolog Tyumen	42	11	13	18	32	47	−15	35	
21	(Russian Soviet Federative Socialist Republic) Kuban Krasnodar	42	8	10	24	40	68	−28	26	
22	(Latvian Soviet Socialist Republic) Pardaugava Riga	42	7	6	29	31	73	−42	20	Withdrew

(C) Champions

Notes:

- On 6 September 1991, the city of Leningrad was renamed into Saint Petersburg
- On 4 September 1991, the city of Sverdlovsk was renamed into Yekaterinburg

==== Soviet Second League ====
Eleven Ukrainian teams (Karpaty Lviv, Zorya Luhansk, Nyva Ternopil, Nyva Vinnytsia, Torpedo Zaporizhzhia, Volyn Lutsk, SKA Odesa, Kremin Kreminchuk, Sudnobudivnyk Mykolaiv, FC Halychyna Drohobych, and Vorskla Poltava) play in this league and all in the west zone of the league. Beside Ukrainian teams in the west zone competed 11 other teams from various union republics. In whole there are three zones West, Center, and East.

Zone West

Pos	Republic (Note: Numerous clubs refused to play away games in Azerbaijan due to the First Nagorno-Karabakh War (Operation Ring).)	Team	Pld	W	D	L	GF	GA	GD	Pts
1	(Ukrainian Soviet Socialist Republic) Ukraine	Karpaty Lviv	42	24	11	7	47	27	+20	59
2	(Ukrainian Soviet Socialist Republic) Ukraine	Zorya Luhansk (Note: Teams that refused to play against Goyazan Kazakh only: Zarya Luhansk and Niva Vinnitsa.)	42	26	5	11	69	34	+35	57
3	(Azerbaijan Soviet Socialist Republic) Azerbaijan	Dinamo Gandzha	42	26	4	12	48	48	0	56 (Note: All Azerbaijani clubs received multiple technical wins such: Dinamo Gandzha: 10 technical wins; +20 points; Karabakh Agdam: 11 technical wins; +22 points; Goyazan Kazakh: 4 technical wins; +8 points)
4	(Ukrainian Soviet Socialist Republic) Ukraine	Nyva Ternopil (Note: Teams that refused to play against Dinamo Gandzha and Karabakh Agdam: Nyva Ternopil, Volyn Lutsk, Tigina-Apoel Bendery, SKA Odesa, Dnepr Mogilev, Kremen Kremenchug, Sudnostroitel Nikolayev, Dinamo Brest, KIM Vitebsk, and Khimik Grodno.)	42	25	6	11	56	29	+27	56
5	(Ukrainian Soviet Socialist Republic) Ukraine	Nyva Vinnytsia	42	21	7	14	54	40	+14	49
6	(Russian Soviet Federative Socialist Republic) Russia (1W)	Torpedo Taganrog	42	19	9	14	46	30	+16	47
7	(Ukrainian Soviet Socialist Republic) Ukraine	Torpedo Zaporizhzhia	42	18	10	14	63	50	+13	46
8	(Ukrainian Soviet Socialist Republic) Ukraine	Volyn Lutsk	42	19	7	16	46	33	+13	45
9	(Moldavian Soviet Socialist Republic) Moldova	Tigina-Apoel Bendery	42	18	8	16	49	39	+10	44
10	(Ukrainian Soviet Socialist Republic) Ukraine	SKA Odesa	42	18	7	17	46	42	+4	43
11	(Azerbaijan Soviet Socialist Republic) Azerbaijan	Karabakh Agdam	42	20	2	20	20	47	−27	42
12	(Byelorussian Soviet Socialist Republic) Belarus	Dnepr Mogilev (Note: Teams that refused to play against all Azerbaijani clubs: Dnepr Mogilev and KIM Vitebsk.)	42	18	6	18	47	37	+10	42
13	(Ukrainian Soviet Socialist Republic) Ukraine	Kremin Kremenchuk	42	16	9	17	56	50	+6	41
14	(Moldavian Soviet Socialist Republic) Moldova	Zaria Beltsy	42	16	7	19	63	82	−19	39
15	(Ukrainian Soviet Socialist Republic) Ukraine	Sudnobudivnyk Mykolaiv	42	15	8	19	61	55	+6	38
16	(Byelorussian Soviet Socialist Republic) Belarus	Dinamo Brest	42	14	9	19	50	50	0	37
17	(Russian Soviet Federative Socialist Republic) Russia (1W)	Spartak Nalchik	42	15	6	21	51	67	−16	36
18	(Ukrainian Soviet Socialist Republic) Ukraine(1)	Halychyna Drohobych	42	14	7	21	42	66	−24	35
19	(Ukrainian Soviet Socialist Republic) Ukraine(1)	Vorskla Poltava	42	10	11	21	39	60	−21	31
20	(Byelorussian Soviet Socialist Republic) Belarus	KIM Vitebsk	42	11	8	23	43	55	−12	30
21	(Azerbaijan Soviet Socialist Republic) Azerbaijan	Goyazan Kazakh	42	13	2	27	29	61	−32	28
22	(Byelorussian Soviet Socialist Republic) Belarus	Khimik Grodno	42	7	9	26	32	55	−23	23

==== Soviet Lower Second League ====
26 teams play in this league, all of which are based in Ukraine.

Zone 1

Pos	Team	Pld	W	D	L	GF	GA	GD	Pts	Promotion or relegation
1	Naftovyk Okhtyrka (C, P)	50	29	17	4	87	34	+53	75	Promoted
2	Prykarpattia Ivano-Frankivsk (P)	50	31	9	10	86	43	+43	71	Promoted
3	Kolos Nikopol	50	28	13	9	86	45	+41	69	
4	Veres Rivne	50	28	13	9	67	38	+29	69	
5	Pryladyst Mukachevo	50	24	14	12	67	42	+25	62	
6	Krystal Kherson	50	23	15	12	82	60	+22	61	
7	Dynamo Bila Tserkva	50	25	9	16	69	50	+19	59	
8	Avtomobilist Sumy	50	20	14	16	51	40	+11	54	
9	Temp Shepetivka (P)	50	19	15	16	64	53	+11	53	Promoted
10	Polissya Zhytomyr	50	22	7	21	64	66	−2	51	
11	Kryvbas Kryvyi Rih	50	19	13	18	75	64	+11	51	
12	Shakhtar Pavlohrad	50	19	12	19	84	66	+18	50	
13	Desna Chernihiv	50	20	9	21	59	59	0	49	
14	Podillya Khmelnytskyi	50	18	13	19	54	55	−1	49	
15	Zakarpattia Uzhhorod	50	20	8	22	59	64	−5	48	
16	Karpaty Kamyanka-Buzka	50	15	15	20	48	55	−7	45	
17	Stal Kommunarsk	50	15	15	20	58	73	−15	45	
18	Dnipro Cherkasy	50	17	10	23	47	59	−12	44	
19	Khimik Sievierodonetsk	50	15	13	22	52	70	−18	43	
20	Vahonobudivnyk Stakhanov	50	17	8	25	56	75	−19	42	
21	SKA Kyiv	50	11	20	19	48	60	−12	42	
22	Chaika Sevastopol	50	13	15	22	58	77	−19	41	
23	Mayak Ochakiv	50	15	10	25	51	76	−25	40	
24	Okean Kerch (R)	50	15	10	25	49	72	−23	40	Relegated
25	Zirka Kirovohrad (R)	50	12	13	25	55	90	−35	37	Relegated
26	Mayak Kharkiv (R)	50	0	10	40	31	121	−90	10	Relegated

(C) Champions; (P) Promoted; (R) Relegated

==== Ukrainian championship among KFK ====
94 teams play in this league, all of which are based in Ukraine. 1991 KFK competitions (Ukraine) season

=== Women ===
==== Soviet Top League ====
Six Ukrainian teams (Arena Kyiv, Dnipro Dnipropetrovsk, Lehenda Chernihiv, Luhanochka Luhansk, Nyva-Olimp Kyiv and Dynamo Kyiv) play in this league, which also contains nine teams from the Russian SFSR and nine more teams from other union republics.

Overall standings

Zone 1
Pos	Team	Pld	W	D	L	GF	GA	GD	Pts	Qualification
1	SKIF Malakhovka	22	16	4	2	35	6	+29	36	Play-off
2	Tekstilshchik Ramenskoye	22	15	5	2	40	13	+27	35	Play-off
3	SKA-Merey Alma-Ata (Note: After the season, SKA-Merey Alma-Ata (founded as Graciya Alma-Ata) were relocated and renamed CSK VVS Samara, due to the dissolution of the Soviet Union.)	22	14	5	3	42	10	+32	33	
4	Volzhanka Cheboksary	22	12	6	4	32	14	+18	30	
5	Prometey St-Peterburg	22	13	3	6	32	18	+14	29	
6	Legenda Chernigov	22	8	6	8	22	11	+11	22	
7	Interlenprom St-Peterburg	22	8	4	10	23	22	+1	20	
8	Niva-Olimp Kyiv	22	7	6	9	28	29	−1	20	
9	Nig Aparan	22	6	2	14	22	44	−22	14	
10	Erebuni Yerevan	22	3	4	15	11	42	−31	10	
11	Shturm Pitkyaranta	22	2	4	16	6	41	−35	8	
12	Viktoriya Kashira	22	1	5	16	5	48	−43	7	

Notes:

Zone 2
Pos	Team	Pld	W	D	L	GF	GA	GD	Pts	Qualification
1	Arena Kyiv	22	14	3	5	29	12	+17	31	Play-off
2	Nadezhda Mogilyov	22	13	5	4	32	11	+21	31	Play-off
3	Spartak Moscow	22	12	6	4	36	13	+23	30	
4	Dnepr Dnepropetrovsk	22	12	4	6	34	19	+15	28	
5	RAF Jelgava	22	12	4	6	39	29	+10	28	
6	Niva Grodno	22	11	4	7	24	22	+2	26	
7	Codru Chisinau	22	8	5	9	23	21	+2	21	
8	Luganochka Lugansk	22	7	7	8	23	23	0	21	
9	Dinamo Kyiv	22	8	4	10	31	27	+4	20	
10	Taraggi Baku	22	5	2	15	14	41	−27	12	
11	Araz Baku	22	3	6	13	12	36	−24	12	
12	SiM Moscow	22	1	2	19	5	51	−46	4	

NB: total goal difference -3

Play-off (in Sevastopol)

Semifinals
Team 1	Score	Team 2
Tekstilshchik Ramenskoye	1-0	Arena Kyiv
Nadezhda Mogilyov	0-0 [2-0 pen]	SKIF Malakhovka

Third-place match
Team 1	Score	Team 2
SKIF Malakhovka	1-0	Arena Kyiv

Final
Team 1	Score	Team 2
Tekstilshchik Ramenskoye	0-0 [6-5 pen]	Nadezhda Mogilov

==== Soviet First League ====
Eight Ukrainian teams (Luys Simferopol, Bukovynka Chernivtsi, Chornomorochka Odesa, Svitlana Dnipropetrovsk, Nika Zaporizhia, ZSU Zaporizhia, Radosin Kyiv, and Debiut-88 Kharkiv play in this league, which also contains 18 teams from the Russian SFSR and six more teams from other union republics.

Zone 1
Pos	Team	Pld	W	D	L	GF	GA	GD	Pts	Qualification
1	CSKA-Transexpo Moscow	14	10	1	3	33	8	+25	21	Play-off
2	Luys Simferopol	14	8	5	1	22	6	+16	21	
3	Bukovinka Chernovtsy	14	9	2	3	34	9	+25	20	
4	Chernomorochka Odessa	14	8	2	4	30	13	+17	18	
5	Svetlana Dnepropetrovsk	14	6	1	7	15	25	−10	13	
6	Fortuna Ogre	14	4	2	8	10	28	−18	10	
7	Elektronika Minsk	14	4	1	9	10	19	−9	9	
8	University Moscow	14	0	0	14	3	49	−46	0	

Zone 2
Pos	Team	Pld	W	D	L	GF	GA	GD	Pts	Qualification
1	Energiya Voronezh	14	13	1	0	49	2	+47	27	Play-off
2	Nika Zaporozhye	14	8	2	4	18	14	+4	18	
3	Snezhana Lyubertsy	14	6	4	4	23	14	+9	16	
4	ZGU Zaporozhye	14	6	4	4	22	15	+7	16	
5	Zvezda Zagorsk	14	5	4	5	20	24	−4	14	
6	Radosin Kyiv	14	5	2	7	15	14	+1	12	
7	MISI Moscow	14	3	3	8	11	26	−15	9	
8	Vologzhanka Vologda	14	0	0	14	3	52	−49	0	

Zone 3
Pos	Team	Pld	W	D	L	GF	GA	GD	Pts	Qualification
1	Spartak-13 Moscow	14	11	2	1	43	9	+34	24	Play-off
2	Sedin-Shiss Krasnodar	14	8	3	3	31	10	+21	19	
3	Viktoriya Stavropol	14	4	8	2	15	8	+7	16	
4	Atoris Moscow	14	5	5	4	17	11	+6	15	
5	Volna Nizhny Novgorod	14	6	2	6	22	26	−4	14	
6	Krylya Sovetov Saransk	14	3	6	5	10	14	−4	12	
7	Nadezhda Voskresensk	14	2	2	10	8	37	−29	6	
8	Debyut-88 Kharkov	14	2	2	10	7	38	−31	6	

Zone 4
Pos	Team	Pld	W	D	L	GF	GA	GD	Pts	Qualification
1	Azaliya Kant	14	11	1	2	24	7	+17	23	Play-off
2	Sibiryachka Krasnoyarsk	14	9	4	1	27	4	+23	22	
3	Lada Togliatti	14	8	2	4	30	11	+19	18	
4	Olimp Karaganda	14	7	3	4	23	9	+14	17	
5	Taganay Zlatoust	14	5	3	6	18	23	−5	13	
6	Shagala Guryev	14	4	3	7	12	26	−14	11	
7	Kama Perm	14	2	0	12	8	33	−25	4	
8	Tokhuchu Baku	14	1	2	11	5	34	−29	4	

First League Play-off (in Voronezh)
Pos	Team	Pld	W	D	L	GF	GA	GD	Pts	Qualification
1	Energiya Voronezh	2	2	0	0	5	1	+4	4	
2	Spartak-13 Moscow	2	1	0	1	3	3	0	2	
3	CSKA-Transexpo Moscow	2	0	0	2	0	4	−4	0	
4	Azaliya Kant	0	-	-	-	-	-	—	0	Withdrew

==== Soviet Second League ====
Six Ukrainian teams (Elehiya Bobrovytsia, Atlanta Sevastopol, Yunist-Helios Luhansk, Mriya Kirovohrad, Azovchanka Mariupol, and Soyuz Kharkiv), which also contains 8 teams from the Russian SFSR and four more teams from other union republics.

Zone 1
Pos	Team	Pld	W	D	L	GF	GA	GD	Pts	Qualification
1	Syuyumbike Zelenodolsk	10	7	1	2	27	11	+16	15	Play-off
2	Gamma Kazan	10	7	0	3	30	8	+22	14	
3	Azaliya-2 Bishkek	10	7	0	3	15	10	+5	14	
4	Sibiryachka-2 Krasnoyarsk	10	4	1	5	17	22	−5	9	
5	Dorozhnik Arkalyk	10	3	0	7	12	20	−8	6	
6	Olimpiya Ishimbay	10	1	0	9	7	37	−30	2	

Zone 2
Pos	Team	Pld	W	D	L	GF	GA	GD	Pts	Qualification
1	Kaluzhanka Kaluga	10	10	0	0	60	1	+59	20	Play-off
2	Komandor Fryazino	10	7	0	3	26	6	+20	14	
3	Trikotazhnitsa Bobruysk	10	6	0	4	18	16	+2	12	
4	Elegiya Bobrovitsa	10	4	0	6	12	28	−16	8	
5	Viktoriya Brest	10	2	0	8	9	47	−38	4	
6	Atlanta Sevastopol	10	1	0	9	11	38	−27	2	

Zone 3
Pos	Team	Pld	W	D	L	GF	GA	GD	Pts	Qualification
1	Rus Moscow	10	10	0	0	78	2	+76	20	Play-off
2	Volna St-Peterburg	10	7	0	3	24	11	+13	14	
3	Yunost-Gelios Lugansk	10	6	0	4	24	14	+10	12	
4	Mriya Kirovograd	10	5	0	5	26	17	+9	10	
5	Azovchanka Mariupol	10	2	0	8	10	54	−44	4	
6	Soyuz Kharkov	10	0	0	10	1	67	−66	0	

NB: total goal difference -2

Second League Play-off
Team 1	Score	Team 2
Rus Moscow	bt	Syuyumbike Zelenodolsk

Kaluzhanka Kaluga – withdrew

== Domestic cups ==
=== Men ===
==== Soviet Cup ====
The last Ukrainian team Chornomorets Odesa was eliminated in quarterfinals. Since semifinals for the Soviet Cup played three Russian teams and Ararat Yerevan.

Semifinals
Lokomotiv Moscow	0
CSKA Moscow	3
Torpedo Moscow (p)	0 (7)
Ararat Yerevan	0 (6)

Final
CSKA Moscow	3
Torpedo Moscow	2

All Ukrainian teams withdrew the competition at quarterfinals due to dissolution of the Soviet Union. Since semifinals for the Soviet Cup played three Russian teams and Pamir Dushanbe.

Semifinals
CSKA Moscow	2
Pamir Dushanbe	0
Lokomotiv Moscow	0
Spartak Moscow	2

Final
Spartak Moscow	2
CSKA Moscow	0

==== Cup of the Ukrainian SSR ====
The Cup of the Ukrainian SSR is a two-legged home-and-away series played among the Second League Ukrainian teams.

24 November 1991	Veres Rivno	1 - 2	Temp Shepetivka	Rivno
	Sarnavsky 22'		Dovhalets 31'; Bondarenko 31'	Stadium: Avanhard Stadium; Attendance: 4,277; Referee: Vadym Shevchenko (Kyiv)

28 November 1991	Temp Shepetivka	1 - 1	Veres Rivno	Khmelnytskyi
	Bondarenko 57'		Mankuta 29'	Stadium: Sport Complex Podillya; Attendance: 4,500; Referee: Valeriy Onufer (Uzhhorod)

Temp won 3–2 on aggregate

==== Ukrainian Cup among KFK ====
The Ukrainian Cup among KFK is a republican cup contested among collectives of physical culture (CPhC or KFK) which in the Soviet Union had an amateur status compered to teams of masters which served as an official term for professional teams. Since 1989 the competition was not conducted.

=== Women ===
==== Soviet Cup ====
The Soviet is a domestic cup contested by women's teams at the top division. Two last Ukrainian teams were eliminated at quarterfinals (Dnipro Dnipropetrovsk and Lehenda Chernihiv).

September 21, 1991	Sibiryachka Krasnoyarsk	0 - 0 (a.e.t.) (3 – 2 p)	Prometey Saint-Petersburg	Moscow

== Ukrainian clubs in international competition ==
=== 1990–91 European competitions ===
6 March 1991 Quarter-finals	Dynamo Kyiv (Soviet Union)	2–3	(Spain) FC Barcelona	Kyiv, Soviet Union
19:00	Zayets 33'; Salenko 81' (pen.)	Report	Bakero 5'; Urbano 45'; Stoichkov 63' (pen.)	Stadium: Republican Stadium, Kyiv; Attendance: 98,000; Referee: David Syme (Scotland)

19 March 1991 Quarter-finals	FC Barcelona (Spain)	1–1	(Soviet Union) Dynamo Kyiv	Barcelona, Spain
20:45	Amor 89'	Report	Yuran 62'	Stadium: Camp Nou; Attendance: 61,500; Referee: Zoran Petrović (Yugoslavia)

(Soviet Union) FC Dynamo Kyiv eliminated from the European competitions.

=== 1991–92 European competitions ===
18 September 1991 First round	HJK Helsinki (Finland)	0–1	(Soviet Union) Dynamo Kyiv	Helsinki, Finland
20:00		Report	Kovalets 32'	Stadium: Olympic Stadium; Attendance: 3,032; Referee: Marek Kowalczyk (Poland)

2 October 1991 First round	Dynamo Kyiv (Soviet Union)	3–0	(Finland) HJK Helsinki	Kyiv, Soviet Union
19:00	Kovalets 28'; Moroz 48'; Hrytsyna 72'	Report		Stadium: Republican Stadium; Attendance: 22,000; Referee: Erman Toroğlu (Turkey)

Dynamo Kyiv won 4–0 on aggregate.

23 October 1991 Second round	Dynamo Kyiv (Soviet Union)	1–1	(Denmark) Brøndby	Kyiv, Soviet Union
19:00	Salenko 77' (pen.)	Report	Nielsen 12'	Attendance: 29,184; Referee: John Blankenstein (Netherlands)

6 November 1991 Second round	Brøndby (Denmark)	0–1	(Soviet Union) Dynamo Kyiv	Brøndby, Denmark
19:00		Report	Yakovenko 6'	Stadium: Brøndby Stadium; Attendance: 13,712; Referee: Leslie Irvine (Northern Ireland)

Dynamo Kyiv won 2–1 on aggregate. Dynamo Kyiv qualified for the Group stage.

27 November 1991 Group stage	Dynamo Kyiv (Soviet Union)	1–0	(Portugal) Benfica	Kyiv, Soviet Union
19:00	Salenko 29'	Report		Stadium: Republican Stadium; Attendance: 41,500; Referee: Keith Hackett (England)

11 December 1991 Group stage	Sparta Prague (Czechoslovakia)	2–1	(Soviet Union) Dynamo Kyiv	Prague, Czechoslovakia
18:00	Němeček 13'; Vrabec 22'	Report	Sharan 55'	Stadium: Letná Stadium; Attendance: 14,639; Referee: Rosario Lo Bello (Italy)

End of calendar year standing

Team	Pld	W	D	L	GF	GA	GD	Pts
(Spain) Barcelona	2	1	1	0	3	2	+1	3
(Czechoslovakia) Sparta Prague	2	1	0	1	4	4	0	2
(Soviet Union) Dynamo Kyiv	2	1	0	1	2	2	0	2
(Portugal) Benfica	2	0	1	1	0	1	−1	1
