= Ashot Khachaturyants =

Russian football functionary

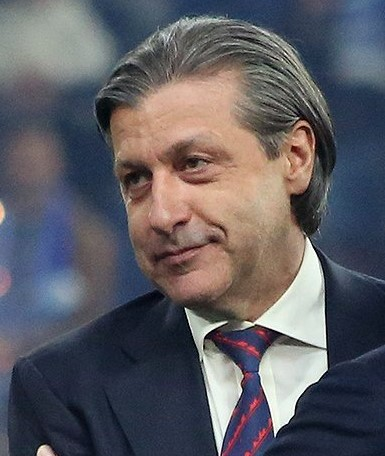

8th President of the Russian Premier League
- Incumbent
- Assumed office 22 November 2021
- Preceded by: Sergey Pryadkin

Personal details
- Born: Ashot Rafailovich Khachaturyants; 25 May 1968 (age 58) Kislovodsk, Russia, Soviet Union
- Education: Gubkin Moscow Oil and Gas Institute
- Occupation: Chairman of the Management Board, CEO

Ashot Rafailovich Khachaturyants (Russian: Ашот Рафаилович Хачатурянц; born May 25, 1968, Kislovodsk, Stavropol Krai, RSFSR, USSR) is a Russian football functionary, Philanthropist of Armenian origin, former vice president and member of the bureau of the executive committee of the Russian Football Union, and former president of the Russian Premier League.

== Biography ==
In 1991 he completed his studies at the Gubkin Moscow Oil and Gas Institute and in the same year began working for the Gazxport company, a subsidiary of the Gazprom Corporation. He was later appointed as Chairman of the "Siderca" Group, an Argentine company that engaged in the oil business and was later acquired by the Japanese. During the 90s he lived and worked in Buenos Aires. In later interview, after becoming President of the Russian Premier League, he revealed himself as strong supporter of the Argentine Football.

In November 2019 he was appointed to manage the Referees Committee of the Russian Football Union and also was Head of the Expert Referees Committee, under the Union's President Alexander Dyukov. Due to this he became a member of the committee for the football development program in the board of directors of the Russian Football Union.

In October 2021 he was appointed as acting President of the Russian Premier League, replacing Sergey Pryadkin who resigned. However, on June 27, 2022, he announced his resignation from the post of president of the RFPL.
