= Ivan Kalchuk =

Russian footballer

Personal information
- Full name: Ivan Sergeyevich Kalchuk
- Date of birth: 8 May 1991 (age 35)
- Height: 1.72 m (5 ft 7 1/2 in)
- Position: Defender

Senior career*
Years	Team	Apps	(Gls)
2012–2015	FC SKA-Energiya Khabarovsk	5	(0)
2013	→ FC Sever Murmansk (loan)	8	(0)
2014	→ FC Yakutiya Yakutsk (loan)	4	(0)
- * Club domestic league appearances and goals

Ivan Sergeyevich Kalchuk (Russian: Иван Серге́евич Кальчук; born 8 May 1991) is a former Russian professional football player.

== Club career ==
He made his Russian Football National League debut for FC SKA-Energiya Khabarovsk on 15 May 2012 in a game against FC Torpedo Vladimir.
