= Aleksandr Kharasakhal =

Russian footballer and coach

Personal information
- Full name: Aleksandr Ivanovich Kharasakhal
- Date of birth: 24 September 1962 (age 64)
- Height: 1.81 m (5 ft 11 1/2 in)
- Positions: Forward; midfielder

Youth career
- DYuSSh Zhdanov

Senior career*
Years	Team	Apps	(Gls)
1979–1980	FC Novator Zhdanov	11	(1)
1983–1991	FC Amur Komsomolsk-na-Amure	244	(57)
1992	FC Okean Nakhodka	7	(0)
1992	FC Amur Komsomolsk-na-Amure	15	(1)
1993–1995	FC Dynamo Yakutsk	85	(17)
1998–2000	FC Viktoriya Komsomolsk-na-Amure		
2001	FC KnAAPO-Smena Komsomolsk-na-Amure (amateur)		
2002	FC Smena Komsomolsk-na-Amure	15	(1)

Managerial career
- 2004: FC Smena Komsomolsk-na-Amure (amateur)
- 2012–: FC DSI Komsomolsk-na-Amure
- * Club domestic league appearances and goals

Aleksandr Ivanovich Kharasakhal (Russian: Александр Иванович Харасахал; born 24 September 1962) is a Russian football coach and a former player.
