= Aleksandr Dyukov =

Russian businessman (born 1967)

- Александр Дюков
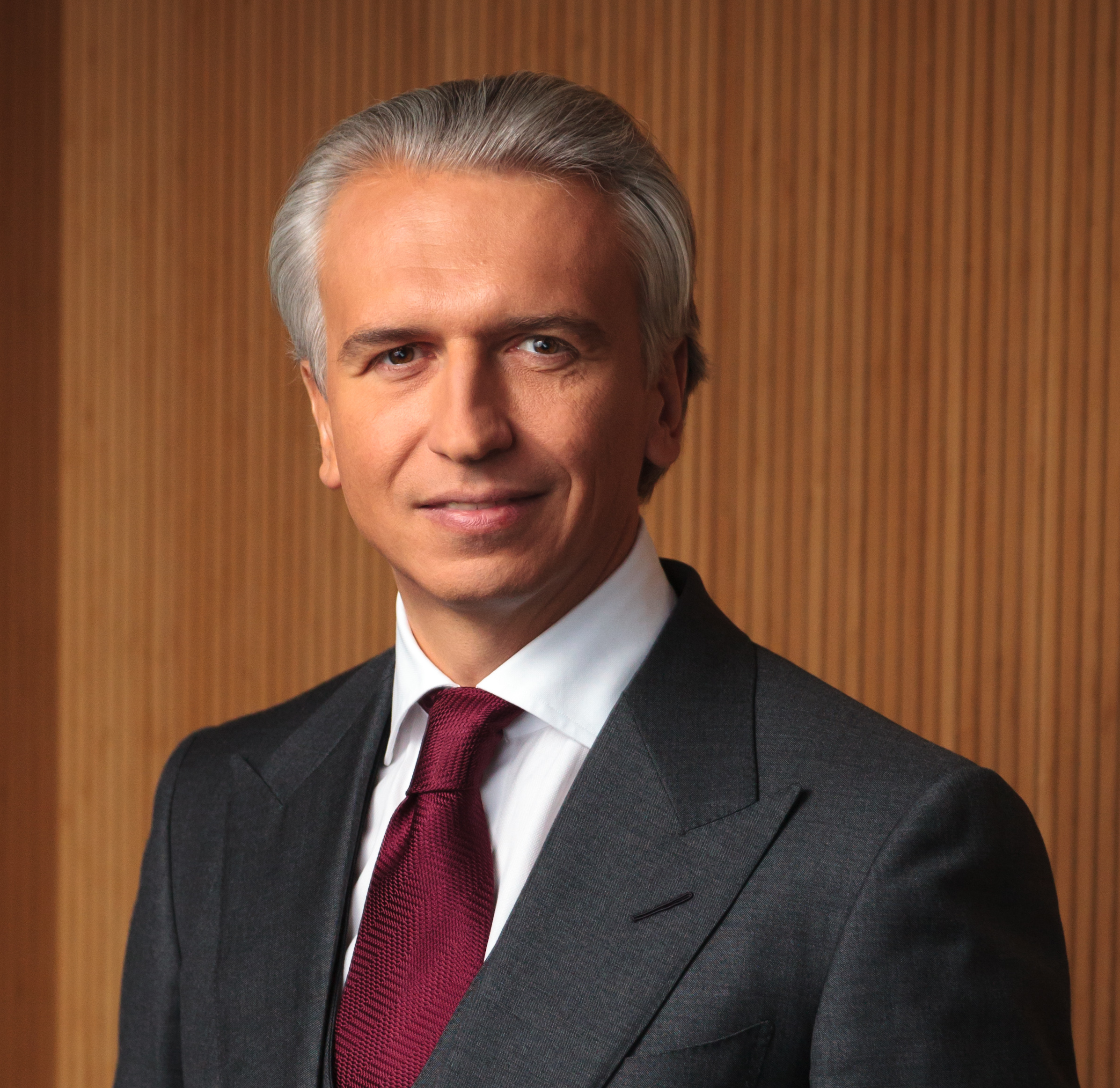
- Dyukov in 2013

11th president of the Russian Football Union
- Incumbent
- Assumed office 22 February 2019
- Preceded by: Sergey Pryadkin

6th president of FC Zenit Saint Petersburg
- In office 2008–2017
- Preceded by: Sergey Fursenko
- Succeeded by: Sergey Fursenko

Personal details
- Born: 13 December 1967 (age 58) Leningrad, Soviet Union
- Education: Leningrad’s Shipbuilding Institute
- Occupation: Chairman and CEO of the Management Board

Alexander Valeryevich Dyukov (Russian: Александр Валерьевич Дюков, IPA: [ɐlʲɪkˈsandr vɐˈlʲerʲjɪvʲɪdʑ ˈdʲukəf]; born 13 December 1967) is a Russian businessman serving as the chairman of the management board of Gazprom Neft, one of Russia's top-5 vertically integrated oil companies by production and amongst the largest oil companies in the world by proven reserves. He was also president of FC Zenit Saint Petersburg and is the current president of the Russian Football Union.

== Education ==
Dyukov graduated from Leningrad's Shipbuilding Institute in 1991 and in 2001 took an IMISP MBA degree at the International Management Institute of Saint Petersburg.

== Career ==
From 1996 to 1998, he was the chief financial officer and chief executive officer of JV CJSC St-Petersburg Oil Terminal.

In 1998, he was appointed economics director and in 1999 acted as chief executive officer of JSC St-Petersburg Sea Port.

In 2000, he resumed his duties in JV CJSC St-Petersburg Oil Terminal as chairman of the board of directors.

From February 2003, he had been appointed president of SIBUR.

In November 2006, he was appointed president of JSC Gazprom Neft and since then, has been chairman of the board of directors of OAO SIBUR Holding.

In January 2008, he became the chairman of the management board and chief executive officer of JSC Gazprom Neft.

In March 2008, he was appointed as president of the football club Zenit. St. Petersburg, which he held until 2017.

In 2011, he became deputy chairman of the board of directors of OAO SIBUR, and in December of the same year, his contract was extended by the board of Gazprom Neft for a further five years.

In February 2019, Dyukov was elected president of the Russian Football Union.

=== Sanctions ===
He was sanctioned by the UK government in 2022 in relation to the Russo-Ukrainian War.
