= Georgy Garmashov =

Russian footballer and official

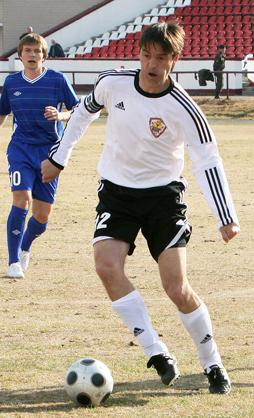

Personal information
- Full name: Georgy Vladimirovich Garmashov
- Date of birth: 12 April 1974 (age 52)
- Height: 1.78 m (5 ft 10 in)
- Positions: Midfielder; forward

Youth career
- FC Lokomotiv Chita

Senior career*
Years	Team	Apps	(Gls)
1994	FC Kristall Neryungri	25	(6)
1994	FC Dynamo Yakutsk	2	(0)
1995–1997	FC Selenga Ulan-Ude	87	(13)
1998–2012	FC Chita	421	(46)

Managerial career
- 2018–2019: FC Chita (director)
- * Club domestic league appearances and goals

Georgy Vladimirovich Garmashov (Russian: Гео́ргий Влади́мирович Гармашо́в; born 12 April 1974) is a Russian professional association football official and a former player.

== Club career ==
He played 9 seasons in the Russian Football National League for FC Chita.
