= Aleksandr Bulanovskiy =

Russian footballer

Personal information
- Full name: Aleksandr Sergeyevich Bulanovskiy
- Date of birth: 29 June 1987 (age 39)
- Height: 1.82 m (6 ft 0 in)
- Positions: Midfielder; defender

Senior career*
| Years | Team | Apps | (Gls) |
| 2005–2007 | FC Metallurg Krasnoyarsk | 26 | (1) |
| 2007 | → FC Zarya Leninsk-Kuznetsky (loan) | 13 | (2) |
| 2009–2010 | FC Metallurg-Kuzbass Novokuznetsk | 48 | (2) |
| 2011–2012 | FC Yakutiya Yakutsk | 34 | (9) |
| 2012–2013 | FC Syzran-2003 | 21 | (5) |
| 2013–2015 | FC Yakutiya Yakutsk | 43 | (10) |
| 2015 | FC Nosta Novotroitsk | 13 | (1) |
- * Club domestic league appearances and goals

Aleksandr Sergeyevich Bulanovskiy (Russian: Александр Серге́евич Булановский; born 29 June 1987) is a former Russian professional football player.

== Club career ==
He played in the Russian Football National League for FC Metallurg Krasnoyarsk in 2006.
