= Sergey Pryadkin =

Former president of the Russian Premier League

- Сергей Прядкин
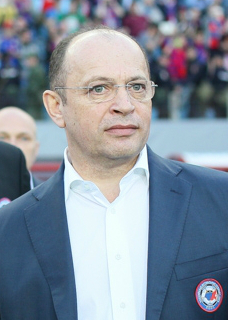

Russian Premier League president
- In office 2005–2009
- Preceded by: Sergei Fursenko
- Succeeded by: Sergei Fursenko
- In office 2015–2021
- Preceded by: Nikolai Tolstykh
- Succeeded by: Alexander Alaev

Personal details
- Born: 17 August 1961 (age 65) Astrakhan, RSFSR, Soviet Union
- Education: Russian Federation Security Guard Service Federal Academy

Sergey Gennadyevich Pryadkin (Russian: Серге́й Генна́дьевич Пря́дкин; born 1961) is a Russian functionary in domestic and international football authorities and institutions.

== Early life ==
Pryadkin was born on 17 August 1961 in Astrakhan, RSFSR, Soviet Union. After school, he enrolled at the School of Military Engineering, run by the KGB, from which he graduated in 1982.

== Intelligence service ==
Pryadkin then served in the Federal Agency of Government Communications and Information, which was responsible for signal intelligence and security of governmental communications. He served, during the same time, as a director of the Dynamo Moscow football club, which has historically enjoyed the support of the Soviet secret services.

== Football ==
In 2005, Pryadkin was elected president of the Russian Premier League.

=== Alleged conflict of interest ===
On 18 April 2011, the Russian newspaper Novaya Gazeta published an article alleging a conflict of interest in the activities of Sergei Pryadkin in his capacity as vice-president of the Russian Football Union and member of its committees, as well as president of the Russian Premier League. The article claimed that Pryadkin was involved, along with other persons, including his brother Andrei Pryadkin, a players' agent, in activities that were deemed in the report to be "illegal". (Note: The other persons whose names were included in the report were Konstantin Sarsanuya, former sport director of FC Zenit Saint Petersburg and FC Dynamo Moscow, and Thomas Zorn. See CAS (2011)) Following the publication of the article, the Novosibirsk regional branch of the Russian association of football fans submitted, on 27 May 2011, a request to the Football Union calling for the investigation of Novaya Gazeta's claims. On 4 July 2011, the Football Union's Ethics Committee closed its investigation founding no merit to the article's claims.

On 31 October 2011, Vladimir Leonchenko and Nikolai Grammatikov, in their capacity as managers, fans, and former football players, filed an appeal at the Football Union's Appeal Committee that was rejected on 31 October 2011. On 14 December of the same year, they filed an appeal at the Lausanne-based Court of Arbitration for Sport (CAS), and, on 24 December, they filed their brief. The Court, on 28 August 2012, upheld the appeal filed by Leonchenko and Grammatikov, and annulled the decision of the Russian Football Union's Appeal Committee, referring the case back to it. There have been no further legal developments in the case.

=== Racism ===
After repeated and well-reported incidents of racism in Russian football, in and outside games, Pryadkin, in May 2015, "vowed to crack down" on racism, calling racist fans "real morons". He added, however, that tackling racism in general was "not a top priority for [Russian football]." "There are some cases [of racism]", he said, "but, as they say, every family has a black sheep." At the same time, Pryadkin stated, "there are some countries where it happens on every match-day... for sure... and it exists in England too".

=== Competition format ===
In 2008, the Russian League announced a plan to switch the football season to playing from autumn through the winter until spring. The objective was to "keep with the majority of Europe's major [competitions]". Pryadkin, announcing the plan, characterized it as "the most important of [the League's] goals". He stated that he expects the transition to occur in an "even-numbered year where there will be a break for the European Championship or World Cup", adding that "this is the way forward from a commercial point of view".

The change was effected in 2012, for the 2012–13 season, during Sergey Fursenko' presidency, after Pryadkin had been voted out in 2009.

Pryadkin was re-elected Union president in 2015, after winning an election reportedly presumed to be contested between former Minister of Sport, chief of Sochi's bid for the 2014 Winter Olympics, and alleged Putin protégé Vitaly Mutko and politician Igor Lebedev.

The Premier League's Strategy Committee, headed by Pryadkin, submitted, in 2020, a report proposing a "re-organisation" of the competition, with the "bigger clubs" playing each other more often than twice each season, and the league splitting into "gold" and "silver" groups. The ostensible aim of the changes was to "halt Russia's slide" in UEFA's rankings of the strongest leagues, which limits the number of Russian clubs in European competitions, as well as to increase club and Union revenue. The Premier League's 16 clubs voted unanimously to keep the standard home-and-away, 30-game format unchanged.

=== World Cup ===
With Russian having won the bid to host the 2018 World Cup, Pryadkin became actively involved in the preparation of stadiums and facilities construction. Inspecting construction progress in as late as May, he stated he was "not particularly happy" with all the stadiums for the June–July competition, pointing out that only the Saint Petersburg stadium has a retractable roof.

=== COVID-19 pandemic ===
In the beginning of 2020, after the COVID-19 pandemic had hit Russia, the Football Union stopped all games. In May, the Union, despite a rise in infections, announced that the season would restart with the remaining games but, as Union president Pryadskin stated, "unfortunately,... without spectators". He stated that the resumption of games in "late June" would give players and clubs ample time to prepare, adding that the Union "will do everything to ensure the safety of all participants". Many Russian players and coaches had to return to Russia from abroad. There followed a "surge" in COVID-19 infections across the country.

=== Resignation ===
On 5 October 2021, Pryadkin, after being unanimously re-elected in 2020 for another 5-year presidential term, resigned from all his positions in the Union. Neither Pryadkin nor the Union provided a reason for the resignation. Reports in the media speculated about "controversies" over television deals, the attempted change in the Premier League format, and Russian teams' "poor results" in European club competitions. The head of the Union's Refereeing Commission, Ashot Khachaturyants, was appointed interim president. On 16 August 2022, Alexander Alaev, former Union vice-president, was elected unopposed as Union president.

== See also ==
- Football in Russia
- Corruption in Russia
