= 1992 Soviet Top League =

Cancelled football season in Soviet Union

Soviet Top League
- Season: 1992
- Dates: 1 March – TBD 1992

The 1992 CIS Top League was a scheduled but eventually canceled season in the Soviet Top League, an attempt to preserve All-Union competitions. The competition was canceled following the joint letter from all five Muscovite clubs that expressed their disagreement with the competition arrangements.

== Preparations ==
Organizational preparation for the season was carrying out parallel to a political process known as dissolution of the Soviet Union. Despite the August coup-d'état, the New Union Treaty negotiations continued on and following meetings in Belovezha Park and Almaty culminated in establishing of an extensively light version of the Soviet Union.

After the signing of Belovezha Accords, the USSR Football Federation executive committee announced that all states of the Commonwealth of Independent States except for Ukraine are ready to participate in the united championship. The decision was also approved by the FIFA and Joseph Blatter told Vyacheslav Koloskov that "it would be an optimal solution for the problem". After losing Baltic participants along with Georgia, Koloskov tried to convince Ukraine to stay and later tried to threaten it with political isolation, a method he used when he was speaking with the Georgian Football Federation president Nodar Akhalkatsi. The executive committee of the Football Federation of the Soviet Union that convened just before the New Year's Eve condemned withdrawal of Ukraine. It also advised to prepare transformation of the Federation into the Association of Football Federations of Independent States of the Commonwealth.

The competition in the league was decided to expand by increasing number of participants to 22 and divide them in two groups by geographical principle. After double round-robin tournament, five better teams from each group qualify for the championship group, while the other teams form relegation group. The worst three teams would relegate.

It also was decided for competition structure in the First League to keep as in the previous year with 22 participants. Also there would be kept the three second leagues, winners of which get promotion to the First League.

Following the New Year's Eve an initiative group consisting of Anzor Kavazashvili, Viktor Ponedelnik, Valentin Ivanov and Hussam al-Khalidi (an Iraqi owner of FC Asmaral Moscow) established a parallel governing body the All-Russian Association of Football on January 9. The All-Russian Association of Football sent a fax to FIFA petitioning to recognize it as a descendant of the Football Federation of the Soviet Union.

On January 10, at a couching council of the Football Federation all teams representatives confirmed their participation and there took place a draw. The very next day (January 11), on initiative of Koloskov there was established the Association of Football Federations of Independent States of the Commonwealth which was instantaneously recognized by both FIFA and UEFA. On January 21, the Federation approved the draw and made March 1 as the start date for the league.

On January 31, plenum of the already existing Football Federation of the RSFSR (as a republican federation chaired by Yuri Nyrkov) decided to hold its conference on February 8 where it planned to review and approve composition of the Russian Top League participants without those clubs that agreed to compete at the CIS competition.

In the beginning of February the five Muscovite clubs CSKA, Spartak, Dynamo, Lokomotiv, and Torpedo published a joint memorandum refusing to participate in the CIS competition calling it "a tournament without future". Among those who initiated the document were from Spartak Oleg Romantsev and Nikolay Starostin, from CSKA Pavel Sadyrin and Viktor Murashko, from Dynamo Valeriy Gazzaev and Nikolay Tolstykh, from Torpedo Yevgeni Skomorokhov and Yuri Zolotov, from Lokomotiv Yuri Syomin and Vitaliy Shevchenko.

On February 7, the session of the executive committee of the Association of Football Federations of Independent States of the Commonwealth reached an agreement that the organization will continue to function until July 3 when the FIFA Congress had to decide to accept in its composition the football federations of newly created states. On February 8, at the Football Federation of the RSFSR Conference took place a transformation of it into the Russian Football Union. For the president ran five candidates Viacheslav Variushin, Nikita Simonyan, Anzor Kavazashvili, Valentin Ivanov and Vyacheslav Koloskov. Ivanov and Variushin withdrew and after some heated debates with 173 votes Koloskov was elected the president of the Russian Football Union, while Nikita Simonyan became the first vice-president.

Representatives of Kazakhstan, Azerbaijan and Middle Asia republics requested to expel the newly created Russian Football Union and Moscow City Football Federation out of the Association of Football Federations of Independent States of the Commonwealth, but Koloskov managed to mitigate the situation promising in exchange of the CIS championship to organize what has developed later in the Commonwealth of Independent States Cup.

The All-Russian Association of Football filed a case against the Russian Football Union and won it. Koloskov was seeking help through the President of Russia assistant and managed to get a signature from Boris Yeltsin. That signature helped to legitimize the Russian Football Union and eventually more clubs chose the Russian Football Union over the All-Russian Association of Football.

== Teams ==
=== Promoted teams ===
Since it became a competitions among CIS members, to the league were included representatives of all its members. Thus, beside the First League (II tier) teams, to the league were promoted couple of the Second League (III tier) teams. Due to expansion, in total to the league were promoted 13 teams, for 9 of which it would have been a debut. Placing last in the league last season FC Lokomotiv Moscow formally avoided relegation.

Eleven teams were promoted from the 1991 Soviet First League:

- Rotor Volgograd – champions (returning after a seasons)
- Tiligul Tiraspol – 2nd place (debut)
- Uralmash Yekaterinburg – 3rd place (debut)
- Rostselmash Rostov-na-Donu – 4th place (debut)
- Neftianik Fergana – 7th place (debut)
- Lokomotiv Nizhniy Novgorod – 8th place (debut)
- Dinamo Sukhumi – 10th place (debut)
- Kairat Almaty – 14th place (returning after three seasons)
- Neftchi Baku – 15th place (returning after three seasons)
- Zenit Saint Petersburg – 18th place (returning after two seasons)
- Navbahor Namangan – 9th place (debut)

Two more teams were promoted from the 1991 Soviet Second League (Group East):

- Kopetdag Ashkhabad – 2nd place (debut)
- Alga Bishkek – 3rd place (debut)

=== Relegated/withdrawn teams ===
Soon after the 1991 Soviet Top League ended, all Ukrainian clubs withdrew from the All-Union competitions to join own domestic which was scheduled to start in March of next year.

- Chornomorets Odesa – the 4th place team of the 1991 Soviet Top League (ending their four-year stay in the top-flight)
- Dynamo Kyiv – the 5th place team of the 1991 Soviet Top League (ending their stay in the top-flight since the creation of the competitions back in 1936)
- FC Dnipro – the 9th place team of the 1991 Soviet Top League (ending their eleven-year stay in the top-flight)
- Shakhtar Donetsk – the 12th place team of the 1991 Soviet Top League (ending their nineteen-year stay in the top-flight)
- Metalurh Zaporizhia – the 13th place team of the 1991 Soviet Top League (ending their year stay in the top-flight)
- Metalist Kharkiv – the 15th place team of the 1991 Soviet Top League (ending their ten-year stay in the top-flight)

Just before the draw of the season playing calendar, it was discovered that the Armenian clubs also do not have interest in competitions. It was replaced with Uzbekistani Navbahor Namangan.

- Ararat Yerevan – the 7th place team of the 1991 Soviet Top League (ending their 26-year stay in the top-flight)

== Projected participants ==
=== Group A ===
Pos	Team	Pld	W	D	L	GF	GA	GD	Pts
1	Pamir Dushanbe	0	0	0	0	0	0	0	0
2	Neftianik Fergana	0	0	0	0	0	0	0	0
3	Alga Bishkek	0	0	0	0	0	0	0	0
4	Kopetdag Ashkhabad	0	0	0	0	0	0	0	0
5	Neftchi Baku	0	0	0	0	0	0	0	0
6	Spartak Moscow	0	0	0	0	0	0	0	0
7	Dinamo Moscow	0	0	0	0	0	0	0	0
8	Lokomotiv Moscow	0	0	0	0	0	0	0	0
9	Tiligul Tiraspol	0	0	0	0	0	0	0	0
10	Zenit Saint-Petersburg	0	0	0	0	0	0	0	0
11	Lokomotiv Nizhniy Novgorod	0	0	0	0	0	0	0	0

Source: www.sports.ru

=== Group B ===
Pos	Team	Pld	W	D	L	GF	GA	GD	Pts
1	Pakhtakor Tashkent	0	0	0	0	0	0	0	0
2	Navbahor Namangan	0	0	0	0	0	0	0	0
3	Kairat Almaty	0	0	0	0	0	0	0	0
4	Spartak Vladikavkaz	0	0	0	0	0	0	0	0
5	Dinamo Sukhumi	0	0	0	0	0	0	0	0
6	CSKA Moscow	0	0	0	0	0	0	0	0
7	Torpedo Moscow	0	0	0	0	0	0	0	0
8	Dinamo Minsk	0	0	0	0	0	0	0	0
9	Rotor Volgograd	0	0	0	0	0	0	0	0
10	Uralmash Yekaterinburg	0	0	0	0	0	0	0	0
11	Rostselmash Rostov-na-Donu	0	0	0	0	0	0	0	0

Source: www.sports.ru

== Number of teams by the CIS states ==
Rank	CIS state	Number of teams	Club(s)
1	Russia	11	CSKA Moscow, Dynamo Moscow, Lokomotiv Moscow, Lokomotiv Nizhniy Novgorod, Rotor Volgograd, Rostselmash Rostov-na-Donu, Spartak Moscow, Spartak Vladikavkaz, Torpedo Moscow, Uralmash Yekaterinburg, Zenit Saint Petersburg
2	Uzbekistan	3	Navbahor Namangan, Neftianik Fergana, Pakhtakor Tashkent
3	Azerbaijan	1	Neftchi Baku
3	Belarus	1	Dinamo Minsk
3	Georgia	1	Dinamo Sukhumi
3	Kazakhstan	1	Kairat Almaty
3	Kyrgyzstan	1	Alga Bishkek
3	Moldova	1	Tiligul Tiraspol
3	Tajikistan	1	Pamir Dushanbe
3	Turkmenistan	1	Kopetdag Ashkhabad

== See also ==
- 1992 Russian Top League
- CIS Super League
