= Korney Shperling =

Russian football manager (1947–2023)

Personal information
- Full name: Korney Andreyevich Shperling
- Date of birth: 7 June 1947
- Date of death: 16 November 2023 (aged 76)
- Place of death: Astrakhan, Russia

Managerial career
- Years: Team
- 1979–1986: Irtysh Omsk
- 1987–1991: Uralmash Sverdlovsk
- 1992–1993: Baltika Kaliningrad
- 1994: Baltika Kaliningrad (consultant)
- 1994–1996: Baltika Kaliningrad (president)
- 1997–1999: Baltika Kaliningrad (consultant)
- 1999–2002: Volgar-Gazprom Astrakhan
- 2002–2003: Dynamo Stavropol
- 2003: Lukoil Chelyabinsk (consultant)
- 2003–2004: Dynamo Bryansk
- 2004: Ural Yekaterinburg (consultant)

Korney Andreyevich Shperling (Russian: Корней Андреевич Шперлинг; 7 June 1947 – 16 November 2023) was a Russian football coach.

He graduated from the Omsk State Institute of Physical Culture in 1968.

Shperling died on 16 November 2023, at the age of 76. The coach struggled with cancer for many years, and shortly before his death he suffered an ischemic stroke.
