= Russian Federation Security Guard Service Federal Academy =

State academy of the Federal Security Service of the Russian Federation in Oryol, Russia

Russian Federation Security Guard Service Federal Academy (FSO Academy of Russia)
- Академия Федеральной службы охраны Российской Федерации (Академия ФСО России)
- Former names: School of Military Engineering; Oryol Higher Military Command School of Communications named after Mikhail Kalinin; Military Institute of Government Communications; FAPSI Academy
- Type: Military academy
- Established: 31 August 1966
- Rector: Major General Sergey Petrovich Gorelik
- Academic staff: 378
- Location: 95 Priborostroitelnaya street, Oryol, Russia; 52°59′10″N 36°03′14″E
- Campus: Urban
- Website: alt.academ.msk.rsnet.ru

Russian Federation Security Guard Service Federal Academy (FSO Academy of Russia; Russian: Федеральное государственное казённое военное образовательное учреждение высшего образования «Академия Федеральной службы охраны Российской Федерации»; Академия ФСО России, Akademiya Federal'noy sluzhby okhrany Rossiyskoy Federatsii; Akademiya FSO Rossii), is an educational institution of higher professional education of the Federal Protective Service located in the city of Oryol, the Administrative centre of Oryol Oblast.

The academy is part of the structure of state protection bodies. This state educational institution of higher education provides military service for cadets.

== History ==
In accordance with the order of the Chairman of the KGB, on 1 June 1966, the School of Military Engineering (Russian: Военно-техническое училище) of the KGB under the Council of Ministers of the USSR was formed in the town of Bagrationovsk, Kaliningrad Oblast, to train [military] Liaison officers of the KGB bodies and troops. On 31 August 1966, the Deputy Chairman of the KGB, Major General Lev Pankratov, presented the SME with the Red Combat Banner and the Diploma of the Presidium of the Supreme Soviet of the USSR. This day is annually celebrated as the day of the formation of the academy.

In accordance with the order of the Chairman of the KGB, on 1 October 1972, the School of Military Engineering was transferred to Oryol and transformed into the Oryol Higher Military Command School of Communications (Russian: Орловское высшее военное командное училище связи) also known as OVVKUS or OHMCSC for the training of command officers with higher education.

On 24 December 1991, the Federal Agency of Government Communications and Information (FAPSI) was formed. By the Decree of the President of Russia Boris Yeltsin, on 21 March 1992, OVVKUS named after Mikhail Kalinin was transformed into the Military Institute of Government Communications (MIGC). On 1 October 1992, the transition to the faculty system of training cadets was carried out. In 1993, a postgraduate training program was formed and the first enrollment for full-time and distance learning was conducted.

On 23 February 1993, on the basis of the MIGC, the Museum of Government Communications was opened to the public, which on 22 October 1993 was entered into the register of state museums of the Russian Federation, and on 29 October 1996 it was reorganized into the FAPSI Museum under the President of the Russian Federation.

In 2000, the Russian Government transformed the MIGC into the Academy of the Federal Agency for Government Communications and Information under the President of the Russian Federation (abbreviated as the FAPSI Academy). In 2003, it was renamed the Academy of the Special Communications and Information Service under the Federal Security Service of the Russian Federation (abbreviated as the Academy of Special Communications of Russia). On 15 November 2004, by order of the Government of Russia, it was renamed the Academy of the Federal Security Service of the Russian Federation (abbreviated as the FSO Academy of Russia).

On 15 September 2008, the Voronezh Military Technical School of the Federal Security Service of the Russian Federation was attached to the FSO Academy of Russia. At the moment, this educational institution is called the Voronezh Institute of Government Communications of the Academy of the Federal Security Service of the Russian Federation.

In September 2016, the academy was awarded the Order of Kutuzov.

== Educational and operational activities ==
Training of cadets at the academy is carried out according to the following main professional educational programs:

- 09.05.01 - Application and operation of automated systems for special purposes
- 10.05.02 - Information security of telecommunication systems
- 11.05.04 - Info-communication technologies and special communication systems
- 57.05.02 - State security

The term of study is 5 years.
