= Stanislav Vorotilin =

Russian footballer and manager

Personal information
- Full name: Stanislav Petrovich Vorotilin
- Date of birth: 11 June 1938
- Place of birth: Moscow, Russian SFSR
- Date of death: 13 May 2013 (aged 74)
- Place of death: Yaroslavl, Russia
- Height: 1.80 m (5 ft 11 in)
- Position: Midfielder

Youth career
- –1955: Krylia Sovetov Moscow
- 1955–1957: FShM Moscow

Senior career*
Years	Team	Apps	(Gls)
1957–1963	FC Shinnik Yaroslavl	142	(43)
1963	FC Dynamo Moscow	1	(0)
1964–1968	FC Shinnik Yaroslavl	108	(3)

Managerial career
- 1968–1969: FC Shinnik Yaroslavl (youth team)
- 1970: FC Shinnik Yaroslavl (assistant)
- 1971–1978: FC Shinnik Yaroslavl (director)
- 1978–1983: FC Shinnik Yaroslavl
- 1983–1989: FC Shinnik Yaroslavl (youth team)
- 1989–1992: FC Shinnik Yaroslavl
- 1992–2001: FC Shinnik Yaroslavl (youth team)
- 2001–2002: FC Neftyanik Yaroslavl
- 2002: FC Shinnik Yaroslavl (scout)
- 2002: FC Shinnik Yaroslavl (youth team)
- * Club domestic league appearances and goals

Stanislav Petrovich Vorotilin (Russian: Станислав Петрович Воротилин; born 11 June 1938 in Moscow; died 13 May 2013 in Yaroslavl) was a Russian football manager and player.
