= Rustem Shaymukhametov =

Russian footballer and coach

Personal information
- Full name: Rustem Radikovich Shaymukhametov
- Date of birth: 10 March 1960 (age 66)
- Height: 1.78 m (5 ft 10 in)
- Positions: Midfielder; striker

Senior career*
Years	Team	Apps	(Gls)
1977–1985	FC Gastello Ufa		
1986–1988	FC Rotor Volgograd	76	(7)
1988–1993	FC Tekstilshchik Kamyshin	192	(73)
1993–1994	Progres Frankfurt		
1995	FC Zvezda Gorodishche	33	(3)
1996	FC Sodovik Sterlitamak	14	(3)
1997–1998	FC Energiya Kamyshin	36	(8)
1998	FC Balakovo	6	(0)
1999	FC Dynamo Nikolayevsk		
1999–2000	FC Pumas Volgograd		
2000–2002	FC Torpedo Volzhsky	60	(5)

Managerial career
- 2003–2004: FC Torpedo Volzhsky
- 2005: FC Torpedo Volzhsky (assistant)
- 2007–2008: FC Kavkaztransgaz-2005 Ryzdvyany (assistant)
- 2009: FC Stavropolye-2009 (assistant)
- 2010–2012: FC Kavkaztransgaz-2005 Ryzdvyany (assistant)
- 2014–2016: FC Ufa (reserves assistant)
- * Club domestic league appearances and goals

Rustem Radikovich (in other sources - Radinovich) Shaymukhametov (Russian: Рустем Радикович Шаймухаметов; born 10 March 1960) is a Russian professional football coach and a former player.

== Club career ==
He made his Russian Premier League debut for FC Tekstilshchik Kamyshin on 29 March 1992 in a game against FC Dynamo-Gazovik Tyumen. He also played at the top tier in 1993.
