= Russian Football Union =

Governing body of association football in Russia

UEFA
- Short name: RFS
- Founded: 19 January 1912; 114 years ago
- Headquarters: 7 Narodnaya Street, Moscow
- FIFA affiliation: 1912
- UEFA affiliation: 15 June 1954; 72 years ago (as Soviet Union); 8 February 1992; 34 years ago (current form)
- President: Aleksandr Dyukov
- Website: rfs.ru

The Russian Football Union (Russian: Российский Футбольный Союз, Rossiyskiy Futbolnyy Soyuz or RFS) is the official governing body of association football in Russia. With headquarters in Moscow, it organizes Russian amateur and professional football, including the men's, women's, youth, beach soccer, futsal and Paralympic national teams. The RFS sanctions referees and football tournaments for the Russian Premier League and other football leagues in Russia.

== Structure ==
The RFS is governed by a board of directors led by a chairman, Nikita Simonyan, and a director general, Aleksandr Alayev. The RFU is a member of international football bodies FIFA and UEFA, and also has a relationship with the International Olympic Committee (IOC).

== History ==
=== Russian Empire ===
The All-Russian Football Union (VFS) was created on 19 January 1912 and in the same year was admitted to FIFA. The Unions initially consisted of 52 organizations across the Russian Empire. All-Russian Football Union was the organizer of Russian Empire national football team.

=== Soviet Union ===
In 1934, the Football Federation of the Soviet Union was formed initially under the name the Football Section of Soviet Union. Its organization was in accordance with the Declaration of the All-Union Council of Fitness Culture of USSR on 27 December 1934. The Section was admitted to FIFA as the Soviet organization in 1946, and admitted to UEFA in 1954. The Section was later reorganized as the Football Federation of the Soviet Union. Concurrently with the Section and later Federation until 1972 there operated the Football Directorate of the Soviet Sport Committee which was subordinated directly to the Soviet Ministry of Sport. The Directorate was never recognized on the international level.

=== Russian Federation ===
After the dissolution of the Soviet Union, on 9 January 1992 there was formed the All-Russian Association of Football (VAF) based on the RSFSR Federation of Football and headed by Anzor Kavazashvili. The VAF conference consisted of 173 delegates from the whole Russian Federation, out of which 172 voted for Kavazashvili, while Kavazashvili abstained from voting himself. The president of the former Soviet federation Koloskov decided to create a parallel organization the Russian Football Union, even though the All-Russian Association of Football (VAF) was acknowledged by the Ministry of Justice and the Supreme Soviet of the Russian Federation as the only governing body of association football in the country.

At the same time Vyacheslav Koloskov who was appointed a president of the Commonwealth of Independent States associations of football federations (descendant of the Soviet Union Football Federation) tried to resolve an issue of conducting the 1992 football championship by negotiating with the Muscovite clubs.

On 31 January 1992 the president of the "supposedly still existing" RSFSR Football Federation Yuri Nyrkov announced about scheduling a conference on 8 February 1992.

On 8 February 1992 at the RSFSR Football Federation conference was created the modern Russian Football Union and Vyacheslav Koloskov was elected the president. At the conference, the Russian Football Union was declared a descendant of both the RSFSR Football Federation as well as the Football Federation of the Soviet Union. Using political connections, Koloskov managed to influence governing bodies of the Russian Federation and the UEFA to reconsider recognition of the All-Russian Association of Football and instead recognize his organization. The newly formed Russian Football Union eventually inherited everything from the previous associations such as the VFS and Football Federation of the Soviet Union and reinstated in FIFA on 3 July 1992. In July 1992, the Russian national football team was formed.

==== Russian invasion of Ukraine ====
Due to the Russian invasion of Ukraine, FIFA and UEFA suspended all Russian teams, whether national representative teams or clubs, until further notice.

After the invasion of Ukraine, Adidas suspended its long-term kit partnership with the Russian Football Union, which first began in 2008. Adidas had provided all Russian teams with kits and had expanded the federation's replica kit sales in the retail market.

During the ban, talk circulated that the RFU were considering seeking to change confederations to the Asian Football Confederation, according to Match-TV broadcaster Dmitry Pirog, stating, "I think the time has come to think seriously about a switch to the Asian football confederation." However, Vyacheslav Koloskov opposed the idea, noting that it would "bring the death of Russian football and also we would never return to the European family." In any event, the switch would have to be ratified by other Asian federations. RFU president Alexander Dyukov ruled out the idea of switching to Asian football and stated that the RFU is part of UEFA and will always be so. In late November 2022, Dyukov said, at an executive board meeting on behalf of TASS, that the possibility of a switch of the association to the AFC might be considered. On 29 December 2022, it was reported that the RFU would hold a meeting the next day to discuss resigning from UEFA, so as to join the AFC. On 30 December, following the meeting, Dyukov stated: "We are indeed considering the option of returning to UEFA competitions as soon as possible", "It is important for us to take part in the World Cup qualifiers". On 20 December 2023, Russian Football Union executive committee voted against the move to Asian Football Confederation, but agreed to re-consider the transfer in the future depending on FIFA or UEFA's actions, effectively making their AFC switch still available on the table.

In October 2023, FIFA and UEFA lifted their ban on Russian U-17 teams, permitting them to rejoin international competitions. This decision drew opposition from Ukraine and several other UEFA member associations. The vice presidents from England, Poland and Wales refused to support the proposal and at least 12 of the 55 member stated that their teams would continue to refuse to play matches against Russia. Subsequently, UEFA abandoned the plan.

In February 2026, in an interview with Sky, FIFA President Gianni Infantino stated the need to consider the issue of Russia's return to participation in international football tournaments, and that the current ban had achieved nothing. "It has only generated more disappointment and hatred", Infantino stated. Following Infantino's statement, UEFA President Aleksander Čeferin confirmed the ban against Russia will continue until the invasion of Ukraine is over. In June 2026, FIFA announced that the ban would be lifted on Russian U-15 teams and that future bans could be lifted, much to the criticism of European and Ukrainian officials. In response, UEFA stated that they were looking to continue the ban on Russia.

== Presidents ==
President Vladimir Putin speaking on the centenary of the Russian Football Union

=== Chairmen of the Football Directorate of the RSFSR Sports Committee (1934–1972) ===
- Alexander Starostin (1956–1958)

=== Chairmen of RSFSR Football Federation (1959–1991) ===
- Alexander Starostin (1959–1967)
- Yuri Nyrkov (1990–1992)

=== All-Russian Association of Football ===
- Anzor Kavazashvili (9 January 1992 – 1992)

=== Russian Football Union (1992-) ===
- Vyacheslav Koloskov (8 February 1992 – 2 April 2005)
- Vitaly Mutko (2 April 2005 – 24 November 2009)
  - acting: Nikita Simonyan (24 November 2009 – 3 February 2010)
- Sergei Fursenko (3 February 2010 – 25 June 2012)
  - acting: Nikita Simonyan (25 June 2012 – 3 September 2012)
- Nikolai Tolstykh (3 September 2012 – 31 May 2015)
  - acting: Nikita Simonyan (31 May 2015 – 2 September 2015)
- Vitaly Mutko (2 September 2015 – 25 December 2017)
  - acting: Aleksandr Alayev (25 December 2017 – 19 December 2018)
  - acting: Sergey Pryadkin (19 December 2018 – 21 February 2019)
- Alexander Dyukov (22 February 2019 – present)
