= FC Yakutiya Yakutsk =

Russian football team

Yakutiya Yakutsk
- Full name: Football Club Yakutiya Yakutsk
- Founded: 1991
- Dissolved: 2016
- Ground: Tuymaada Stadium
- Capacity: 12,800
- 2015–16: PFL, Zone East, 8th
Home colours	Away colours

FC Yakutiya Yakutsk (Russian: ФК "Якутия" Якутск) was a Russian football team from Yakutsk. It played professionally from 1991 to 1995 and then beginning again from the 2011–12 season, including two seasons (1992–1993) at the second highest level, the Russian First Division. It did not apply for the professional license for the 2016–17 season due to lack of financing.

== History ==
=== First incarnation: Dynamo Yakutsk ===
Although football is thought to have been played in Yakutia since before the Russian Revolution, there was no formal team representing the republic in Russian football until 1991 when the club, then known as Dynamo Yakutsk finished in 10th place in the fourth-tier Soviet Second League B. Despite their mid table finish, the political changes in Russia at the time led to significant upheavals in the way in which football was organised in the country. The following season, Dynamo found themselves playing in the second tier competing in the First League East again finishing in mid table, though with Vladimir Misyuchenko finishing as second highest scorer in the division with thirteen goals. In 1993, they improved their final placing by one position, but, since the Russian Football Union decided that from the following season the second tier would consist of only one division and that Eastern teams would make up only five of the members, Dynamo returned to the third tier Second League – Far East Zone for the 1995 season, missing out on remaining in the first division by just two points. Despite this setback, Dynamo produced their best ever league performance that season, finishing in first place. During this season the team was coached by Igor Kriushenko and aided by influential player Georgy Garmashov. In addition, both Aleksandr Kharasakhal and Igor Khimushkin scored eleven goals for the team. Again, the seemingly ceaseless reorganisation of Russian lower league football conspired against Dynamo. Their first-place finish was not enough to guarantee promotion, instead the two winners of the Siberia and East zones played a home-and-away series for promotion to the Russian First League. Siberian Champions FC Chkalovets Novosibirsk lost to Dynamo 1–2 in the first leg in Yakutsk, but won 2–0 in Novosibirsk, 3–2 on aggregate and were promoted. A further reorganisation took place for the 1995 season with the Siberian and Far Eastern Divisions being merged into one. Dynamo performed satisfactorily, finishing in twelfth position. However, after this season, the club was disbanded and they did not play at all in 1996.

=== Brief reformation: Montazhnik ===
An attempt to revive the team by the government of the Sakha Republic was made in 1997 under the name Montakhnik (Russian: Монтажник, lit. Installers), but this was a resolute failure. The team entered the fifth tier Far East zone for a week long tournament with four other teams in Raychikhinsk, but lost all four games scoring only three goals whilst conceding sixteen. This was to be the end of the club for the next eleven years, though there are some indications that attempts were made to continue the club during this time but that they were wholly without success.

=== Second reformation: Fakel to FC Yakutia ===
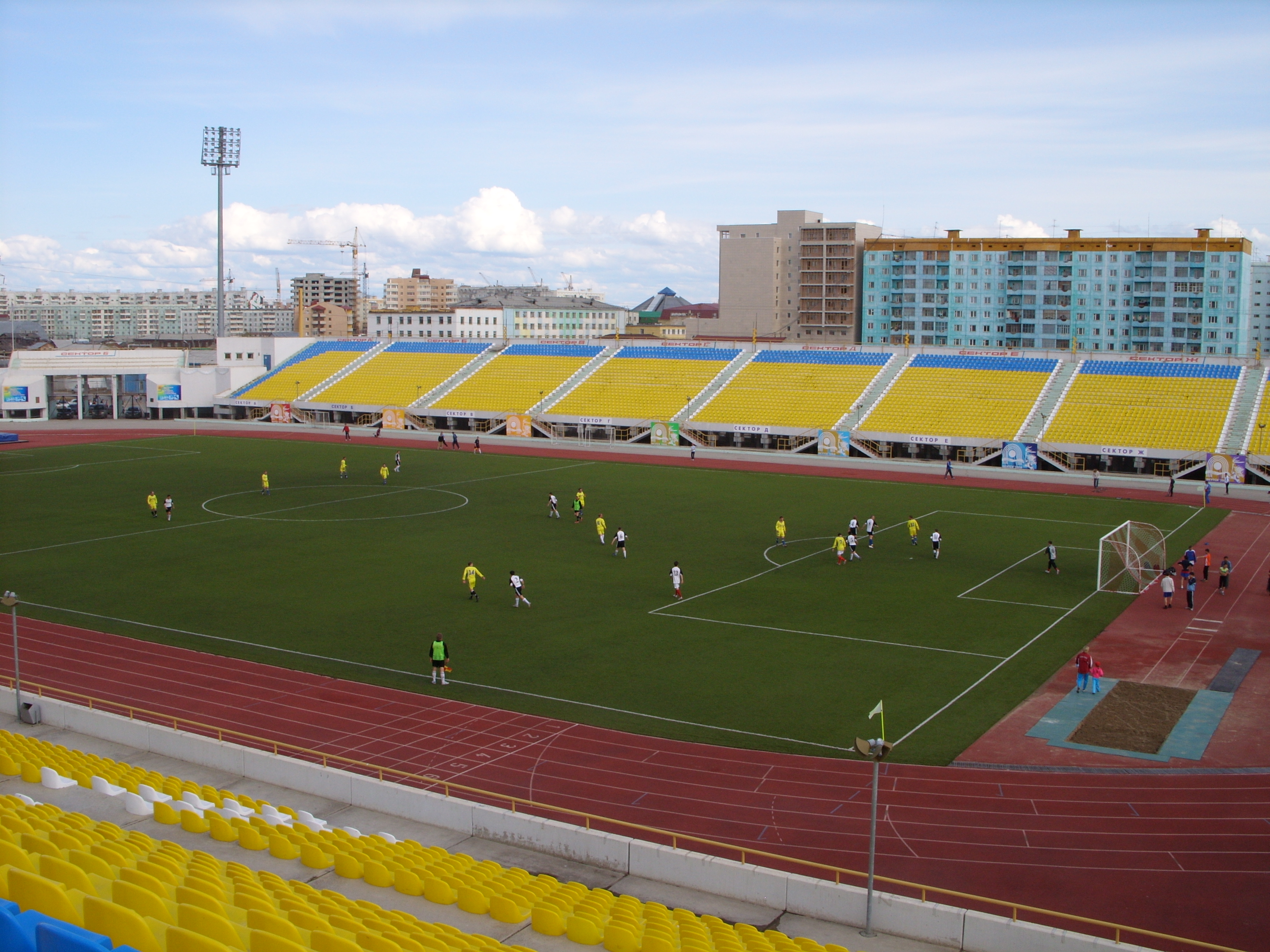
A football match taking place at FC Yakutia's Tuymaada Stadium in 2007.

On 14 July 2008 the President of the Sakha Republic, Vyacheslav Shtyrov, held a meeting, the main theme of which was the development of football in Yakutia. At the meeting he invited the deputy chairman of the Republican government of Alexander Vlasov, the head of the State Committee Mikhail Gulyaev, the head of the Football Association Vladimir Kozhevnikov, and the mayor of Yakutsk Yuri Zabolev, as well as representatives of football clubs. The republic immediately intensified its efforts to expand the network of sports facilities, a number of events held at various levels and the club which would become FC Yakutia was resurrected for a second time, this time as Fakel-ShVSM Yakutsk (Russian: "Факел‑ШВСМ" Якутск, lit. Torch – School of High Sports Mastery). However, during this time the club played in Neryungri (740 kilometers (460 mi) south of Yakutsk) as this settlement is much closer to other participants in the Second Division. the team re-entered the fifth-tier Amateur Football League, and another mid-table finish pleased the club, who were happy that the team did not disintegrate again in just one season. In addition to a satisfactory finish in the league, at the end of August, the team traveled to Svobodny for the AFL Dalny Vostok Cup. The team qualified for the knockout stage, finishing second in their group, before being beaten in the semi-finals by the reserve team of SKA-Khabarovsk. A similar performance, having moved back to Yakutsk was delivered the following season in 2009 in the league, although there performance in the cup was less successful as they managed only a single victory in the round-robin competition against SKA-Khabarovsk.

The 2010 season delivered a third consecutive mid-table finish, in a low scoring competition in which no player scored more than 7 goals and Aleksandr Dmitriyev finished top scorer for ShVSM. However, the team were more successful in the Third Division (AFL) Dalny Vostok Cup, winning the competition for the first time. Travelling to Khabarovsk at the end of April, ShVSM were drawn in Group B with Amur-2010 Blagoveshchensk, Polytechnic Khabarovsk and SKA-Energiya Khabarovsk Amateurs. An opening loss to SKA, who defeated them in the cup the previous season was followed by a 4–1 victory over Polytechnic and a 1–1 draw with Amur-2010, to finish second in the group and qualify for the semi-finals. In the semi-final they defeated FC Blagoveshchensk 4–0, before avenging the previous season's defeat to SKA, beating them 1–0 in the final. There were further reorganisations in the 2011–12 season and ShVSM, now renamed FC Yakutia, found themselves promoted to the Second Division as it expanded to thirteen teams. This step up was a challenge for the club and they narrowly avoided relegation finishing in twelfth place. During the course of the season, an indoor football stadium named Dokhsun Sports Complex was completed allowing the club to train and play matches in Yakutsk all year round as well as to aid the development of youth football in the region. In addition to the completion of the indoor football stadium, the club was also able to sign significant sponsorship deals with two major Yakutian Companies: Choron Diamond and Roslek, which then club president Dmitry Glushko described as sufficient to put the club's budget on par with other teams in the Second Division, with the Choron Diamond name appearing on the club's shirts.

=== 2013 financial crisis ===
During the 2012–13 season, the club faced a financial crisis in January 2013 as they failed to pay their players and staff on time. A meeting of the dispute resolution chamber of the Russian Football Union, considering a complaint brought by two players, ordered the club to pay all outstanding wages within 30 days of the meeting and banned them from registering any new players until they had cleared their debts. As the second half of the season progressed, the financial crisis worsened and in March the Yakutian prosecutor's office conducted an audit into the club amid allegations of labour law violations. This audit found that the club had salary arrears in the region of Rb 3 million, mainly as a result of the refusal of two of the club's main sponsors Choron Diamonds and Roslek to continue financing the club, as well as a complete lack of procedures concerning the regular payment of salaries to staff and players. When the initial sponsorship contracts with these two companies expired, they were not renewed. The Rb 40 million state subsidy was insufficient to run the club on its own and so the club's finances worsened rapidly, with salaries having not been paid for five months. On 21 March 2013, a further session was held with the dispute resolution chamber of the Russian Football Union, where this time, six named players complained that they had not received wages. Again, the RFU ordered the club to pay the outstanding wages within 30 days and again imposed a ban on the club from signing any new players. In order to resolve this dispute, the Prime Minister of Yakutia, Galina Danchikova, issued a decree (Note: "О предоставлении субсидии из государственного бюджета Республики Саха (Якутия) некоммерческому партнерству Футбольный клуб "Якутия" в 2013 году" (On the granting of subsidies from the state budget of the Republic of Sakha (Yakutia), the non-profit partnership Football Club "Yakutia" in 2013).) stating that in addition to providing an annual Rb 40 million grant, they would also subsidise salaries and bonuses.

Nonetheless, despite the financial crisis, which had a significant impact on their winter break training, the team produced their best performance since 1994, finishing in seventh place, though their target was fifth, despite their situation. Their fortunes changed the following season. Not long after the season had started, the club announced they had found new sponsors in the form of the Yakutian Diamond Company. This new sponsorship saw the team improve on the previous seasons position, finishing in sixth place, albeit with a reduced number of teams competing. In addition to this, the club equalled their best ever performance in the Russian Cup, achieved in 1995, reaching the fourth round. Receiving a bye in the first round, they beat Sakhalin Yuzhno-Sakhalinsk on penalties in the second round and amateur fourth tier team FC Belogorsk 1–0 in the third round before losing 3–0 to FC SKA-Khabarovsk's first team from the second tier in the third round. Their improved fortune was not to last long however. Although they were able to maintain a mid-table finish in 2014–15, the club lost one of their most important players, Konstantin Maltsev during the mid-season break. Barely a month later, the club were raided by the police who removed documents in relation to an investigation into further financial irregularities.

=== 2016 financial crisis and dissolution ===
Nonetheless, at the start of 2015–16 season, the mood was positive, the team were on a training camp in Krasnodar and were confident that they understood what they needed to do in order to improve. Their performance however, was not good, and they finished in seventh place out of nine competing teams, with Amur-2010 Blagoveshchensk and Sibiryak Bratsk having withdrawn midway through the season following the loss of their main sponsors. As the season progressed, it became increasingly clear that the club were once again in the midst of significant financial troubles and that the Yakutian Ministry of Sport were very dissatisfied with their performance. The minister of sport, Mikhail Gulyaev, remarked, "The club is allocated 70 million rubles a year. They lose. This can not continue. The team will be disbanded. The Republic can be represented by two teams in the third league. For every need for 18 million rubles, which significantly reduce costs. That is the position of the Ministry of Sports".

With comments like that it was clear that the club's days were numbered. Previously, the state had supplied Rb 30 million in funding, but in April 2016 this was cut to just 15. Even this was slow in being disbursed to the club and there were serious questions raised as to whether the club would even be able to complete the 2015–16 season, let alone compete in the next. Sports Minister Gulayev estimated that the debts of the club would grow to around Rb 100 million rubles if they continued to play in the Second Division and that it would be better to switch the club to a lower league where it would be cheaper to run. However, Gulayev acknowledged several issues with this plan: firstly that applications for the third division closed in April 2016, but the second division season did not finish until May and secondly that the third division was an amateur competition which also included their farm team Yakutia-RSDYuFSh. By the time of their game against Chita towards the end of April, the financial situation was critical and the company was on the verge of collapse according to supporters groups. By the middle of May, it was looking highly unlikely that the club would be able to fulfill its remaining fixtures, with head coach Sergey Shishkin remarking that, "I think that our match [against Irtysh Omsk] is likely to be our last. Apparently, we're not going to travel". These fears were confirmed three days later when the club informed their opponents that they would not be able to fulfill these fixtures and 3–0 technical defeats were awarded against them, and in addition, they were fined Rb 1 million by the Russian Football Union. As a result of these conceded games, the club slipped to eighth place and were relegated. This was essentially irrelevant however, as they were banned from taking part in the Second Division the next season as a result of their failure to fulfill fixtures. By the end of 2016, all avenues of exploration had been exhausted and the only way to proceed now was for the club to declare bankruptcy with a wage arrears of around Rb 9 million. On 8 April 2017, FC Yakutia Yakutsk were formally expelled from the Russian Football Union.

== Stadium ==
The club had two official stadia in its final season. The main stadium was the 12,500 capacity Tuymaada Stadium in Yakutsk. Because of the climate in Yakutia, the club also used the 3,000 capacity Dokhsun Sports Complex, and indoor sports facility also in Yakutsk which would enable to team to train and play all year round.

== Supporters ==
The club had a small supporters group of approximately fifty members called "Polar Pack" (Russian: Полярная стая). The group was originally formed as the "Northern Brotherhood" (Russian: Северное братство), but was changed to the Polar Pack shortly after foundation as it was the same name as used by a biker club in Yakutsk who objected to them using the name.

== Name history ==
- Dynamo Yakutsk (Russian: "Динамо" Якутск) (1991–1996)
- Montazhnik Yakutsk (Russian: "Монтажник" Якутск) (1997–2003)
- FC Yakutsk (Russian: ФК Якутск) (2004–2007)
- Fakel-ShVSM Yakutsk (Russian: "Факел‑ШВСМ" Якутск) (2008–2009)
- ShVSM (Russian: ШВСМ Якутск) (2010–2011)
- FC Yakutia (Russian: ФК "Якутия" Якутск) (2011–2016)

== Season by season performance ==
Season	Level	Pos	Pld	W	D	L	Goals	Points	Domestic Cup	Ref
1991	Soviet Second League B	10	34	12	9	13	28–38	33	Did not enter	
1992	First League East	8	30	13	5	12	41–32	31	Round 1 (Note: Dynamo Yakutsk were disqualified before playing their match against Irtysh Omsk)	
1993	First League East	7	30	14	7	9	41–27	35	Did not enter	
1994	Second League – Far East Zone	1 (Note: Dynamo lost a play-off against the champions of Siberia and remained in the Second League)	32	22	6	4	69–24	50	Round 1	
1995	Second League – Far East Zone (Note: Despite finishing twelfth out of eighteen teams, Dynamo were disbanded and did not play in the 1996 season.)	12	34	13	6	15	47–59	45	Round 4	
1996	Disbanded									
1997	Amateur Football League – Far East Zone	5	4	0	0	4	3–16	0	Did not enter	
1998–2007	Did not play									
2008	Amateur Football League – Far East Zone	5	18	8	3	7	26–23	27	Did not enter	
2009	Amateur Football League – Far East Zone	6	14	5	2	7	19–27	17	Did not enter	
2010	Amateur Football League – Far East Zone	4	12	5	3	4	13–18	18	Round 2	
2011–12	Second Division East	12	36	7	8	21	38–76	29	Round 1	
2012–13	Second Division East	7	30	9	8	13	37–46	35	Round 1	
2013–14	Professional Football League East	6	24	10	5	9	36–36	35	Round 4	
2014–15	Professional Football League East	7	24	6	2	16	28–47	20	Round 2	
2015–16	Professional Football League East	8	24	6	7	11	38–49	25	Round 2	
2016–17	Disbanded									

== Honours ==
- Second League – Far East Zone

Winners: 1994

- Third Division (AFL) Dalny Vostok Cup

Winners: 2010

== Club records ==
- Most games played for the club: Aleksandr Kharasakhal – 83 (1993–1995)
- All-time top scorer: Vladimir Misyuchenko – 20 (1992–1994)
- Most goal in a season: Viktor Koshko – 16 (1995)

=== Season-by-season top scorer ===
Season	Top scorer	Goals	Ref
1992	Vladimir Misyuchenko	11	
1994	Aleksandr Kharasakhal; Igor Khimushkin	11	
1995	Viktor Koshko	16	
2008	Aleksandr Bulanovskiy	6	
2010	Aleksandr Dmitriyev	5	
2011–12	Aleksandr Bulanovskiy	9	
2012–13	Yury Ivanov	6	
2013–14	Aleksandr Bulanovskiy	7	
2014–15	Konstantin Maltsev	9	
2015–16	Anton Savchenko	6	
