= Aleksandr Tikhonov (footballer) =

Russian footballer and coach

Personal information
- Full name: Aleksandr Nikolayevich Tikhonov
- Date of birth: 21 November 1963 (age 62)
- Height: 1.73 m (5 ft 8 in)
- Position: Forward

Senior career*
Years	Team	Apps	(Gls)
1981–1985	FC Rostselmash Rostov-on-Don	87	(21)
1986–1988	FC Taganrog	78	(43)
1988–1993	FC Rostselmash Rostov-on-Don	143	(38)
1993	→ FC Rostselmash-2 Rostov-on-Don (loan)	11	(2)
1994	Kajaanin Haka	3	(0)
1994–1995	FC SKA Rostov-on-Don	29	(10)
1995	FC Istochnik Rostov-on-Don	13	(2)
1997	FC Torpedo Taganrog	11	(0)

Managerial career
- 2001: FC Lokomotiv Nizhny Novgorod (assistant)
- * Club domestic league appearances and goals

Aleksandr Nikolayevich Tikhonov (Russian: Александр Николаевич Тихонов; born 21 November 1963) is a former Russian football player and coach.
