= Nikolai Agafonov =

Russian footballer

Personal information
- Full name: Nikolai Vasilyevich Agafonov
- Date of birth: June 15, 1947 (age 79)
- Position: Midfielder

Senior career*
Years	Team	Apps	(Gls)
1965–1970	FC Torpedo Rubtsovsk		
1971–1974	FC Dynamo Barnaul		

Managerial career
- 1982–1987: FC Manometr Tomsk
- 1987–1991: FC Uralmash Sverdlovsk (assistant)
- 1991–1992: FC Uralmash Yekaterinburg
- 1998–2001: FC Uralmash Yekaterinburg
- 2002: FC Kuzbass-Dynamo Kemerovo
- * Club domestic league appearances and goals

Nikolai Vasilyevich Agafonov (Russian: Николай Васильевич Агафонов; born 15 June 1947) is a Russian professional football coach and a former player.
