= Yuri Nyrkov =

Soviet footballer

Personal information
- Full name: Yuri Aleksandrovich Nyrkov
- Date of birth: June 29, 1924
- Place of birth: Vyshny Volochyok, Russian SFSR
- Date of death: December 20, 2005 (aged 81)
- Place of death: Moscow, Russia
- Position: Defender

Youth career
- Yunye Pionery Stadium Moscow

Senior career*
Years	Team	Apps	(Gls)
1946–1947	GVSG	?	
1948–1952	CDKA aka CDSA Moscow	68	(0)
1952	Kalinin City Team	3	(0)
1953	MVO Kalinin	0	
1954	CDSA Moscow	23	(0)

International career
1952	USSR	3	(0)
- * Club domestic league appearances and goals

Yuri Aleksandrovich Nyrkov (Russian: Юрий Александрович Нырков) (June 29, 1924, Vyshny Volochyok, Russian SFSR – December 20, 2005, Moscow) was a Soviet football player.

== Honours ==
- Soviet Top League winner: 1948, 1950, 1951.
- Soviet Cup winner: 1948, 1951.

== International career ==
Nyrkov made his debut for USSR on July 15, 1952, in an Olympics game against Bulgaria.

== Personal ==
He served in the army in World War II. After his retirement from soccer he returned to service and eventually reached the rank of Major General.
