= Oleg Kurdikov =

Russian footballer

Personal information
- Full name: Oleg Nikolayevich Kurdikov
- Date of birth: 13 April 1969 (age 57)
- Height: 1.84 m (6 ft 1/2 in)
- Positions: Defender; midfielder

Youth career
- FC Geolog Tyumen

Senior career*
Years	Team	Apps	(Gls)
1985–1986	FC Geolog Tyumen	4	(1)
1987	FC Montazhnik Tyumen		
1990–1991	FC Spartak Tyumen		
1991	FC Progress Biysk	25	(0)
1992	FC Neftyanik Uray	14	(0)
1992–1993	FC Dynamo-Gazovik Tyumen	9	(0)
1994–1999	FC Irtysh Tobolsk	133	(9)
- * Club domestic league appearances and goals

Oleg Nikolayevich Kurdikov (Russian: Олег Николаевич Курдиков; born 13 April 1969) is a former Russian football player.
