= Eduard Zagumenny =

Russian footballer

Personal information
- Full name: Eduard Vladimirovich Zagumenny
- Date of birth: 19 February 1973 (age 53)
- Height: 1.80 m (5 ft 11 in)
- Position: Defender

Youth career
- FC Geolog Tyumen

Senior career*
Years	Team	Apps	(Gls)
1993	FC Dynamo-Gazovik Tyumen	10	(0)
1995	FC Dynamo-Gazovik Tyumen	0	(0)
1995–1998	FC Irtysh Tobolsk	88	(13)
1998–2002	FC Tyumen	83	(10)
2004	FC Tyumen (amateur)		
- * Club domestic league appearances and goals

Eduard Vladimirovich Zagumenny (Russian: Эдуард Владимирович Загуменный; born 19 February 1973) is a Russian former football player.
