= 2000–01 Russian Cup =

Tournament details
- Country: Russia

Final positions
- Champions: Lokomotiv Moscow
- Runners-up: Anzhi Makhachkala

The 2000–01 Russian Cup was the ninth season of the Russian football knockout tournament since the dissolution of Soviet Union.

The tournament was won by Lokomotiv Moscow who beat Anzhi Makhachkala on penalties in the final after the match finished 1–1 after extra time.

== First round ==
The first round was played on 29 March 2000, and featured Russian Football National League teams only.

Team 1	Score	Team 2
29 March 2000
Venets Gulkevichi	4–0	Druzhba Maykop
Spartak-Kavkaztransgaz Izobilny	1–2 (a.e.t.)	Dynamo Stavropol
Kavkazkabel Prokhladny	1–1 (a.e.t.) (5–4 p)	FC Mozdok

== Second round ==
The second round was played between 18 April and 2 May 2000, and featured Russian Football National League teams only.

Team 1	Score	Team 2
18 April 2000
Shakhtyor Shakhty	2–0	FC Yelets
Torpedo Taganrog	1–4	SKA Rostov-on-Don
Kuban Krasnodar	3–0	Venets Gulkevichi
Vityaz Krymsk	1–0	FC Slavyansk
Dynamo Stavropol	4–1	Kavkazkabel Prokhladny
Iriston Vladikavkaz	1–4	Avtodor Vladikavkaz
Nart Nartkala	2–0	Angusht Nazran
Dynamo Makhachkala	0–1	Sudostroitel Astrakhan
19 April 2000
Dynamo Vologda	3–0	Sheksna Cherepovets
Mosenergo Moscow	1–2	Neftyanik Yaroslavl
FC Pskov	w/o	Dynamo Saint Petersburg
FC Khimki	2–0	Volochanin-89 Vyshny Volochyok
Spartak-Telekom Shuya	1–2	Spartak Kostroma
Avtomobilist Noginsk	0–2	FC Krasnoznamensk
Oazis Yartsevo	2–1	Energiya Velikiye Luki
Sportakademklub Moscow	2–1	Spartak Shchyolkovo
Spartak Ryazan	0–1 (a.e.t.)	Spartak Lukhovitsy
Fabus Bronnitsy	2–1	FC Kolomna
Lotto MKM Moskva	2–0	Spartak-Orekhovo
Kosmos Elektrostal	3–1 (a.e.t.)	Titan Zheleznodorozhny
Khimik Novomoskovsk	1–0	Arsenal-2 Tula
Lokomotiv Kaluga	2–1 (a.e.t.)	Dynamo Bryansk
Avangard Kursk	0–1 (a.e.t.)	FC Oryol
Spartak Tambov	1–0	Lokomotiv Liski
28 April 2000
FC Tyumen	3–0	Tobol Kurgan
UralAZ Miass	1–1 (a.e.t.) (4–1 p)	Metallurg-Metiznik Magnitogorsk
Uralmash Yekaterinburg	4–0	Zenit Chelyabinsk
Dynamo Perm	2–5	Uralets Nizhny Tagil
Dynamo Izhevsk	0–1	Energiya Chaykovsky
Spartak Yoshkar-Ola	1–0 (a.e.t.)	Dynamo-Mashinostroitel Kirov
KAMAZ-Chally Naber. Chelny	0–2	Neftekhimik Nizhnekamsk
Gazovik Orenburg	2–3	Sodovik Sterlitamak
2 May 2000
Dynamo Omsk	0–2	Irtysh Omsk
KUZBASS Kemerovo	1–0	Chkalovets-Olimpik Novosibirsk
Metallurg Novokuznetsk	3–1	Dynamo Barnaul
Zvezda Irkutsk	4–0	Selenga Ulan-Ude
Amur-Energiya Blagoveshchensk	2–1	SKA-Energiya Khabarovsk
Luch Vladivostok	1–0	Okean Nakhodka
Lada-Energiya Dimitrovgrad	0–1	Volga Ulyanovsk
Biokhimik-Mordovia Saransk	0–1	Svetotekhnika Saransk
Salyut Saratov	1–0	Iskra Engels
Olimpia Volgograd	5–1	FC Torpedo Volzhsky
FC Balakovo	2–0	Khopyor Balashov
Torpedo-Viktoriya Nizhny Novgorod	1–0	Diana Volzhsk
Khimik Dzerzhinsk	0–2	Energetik Uren
Torpedo Pavlovo	3–1	Metallurg Vyksa

== Third round ==
The third round was played between 24 and 29 May 2000, and featured Russian Football National League teams only.

Team 1	Score	Team 2
24 May 2000
Irtysh Omsk	1–0	KUZBASS Kemerovo
Reformatsiya Abakan	1–0	Metallurg Novokuznetsk
Sibiryak Bratsk	0–2	Zvezda Irkutsk
Luch Vladivostok	1–0	Amur-Energiya Blagoveshchensk
28 May 2000
Neftyanik Yaroslavl	2–0	Dynamo Vologda
FC Pskov	1–2	FC Khimki
FC Krasnoznamensk	2–1	Spartak Kostroma
Oazis Yartsevo	2–1	Sportakademklub Moscow
Spartak Lukhovitsy	2–0	Fabus Bronnitsy
Kosmos Elektrostal	2–1	Lotto MKM Moskva
Lokomotiv Kaluga	1–0	Don Novomoskovsk
FC Oryol	5–1	Spartak Tambov
SKA Rostov-on-Don	1–0	Shakhtyor Shakhty
Vityaz Krymsk	0–1	Kuban Krasnodar
Avtodor Vladikavkaz	4–2	Dynamo Stavropol
Sudostroitel Astrakhan	2–0	Nart Nartkala
29 May 2000
Volga Ulyanovsk	1–0	Svetotekhnika Saransk
Salyut Saratov	3–2 (a.e.t.)	Olimpia Volgograd
FC Balakovo	1–0	Torpedo-Viktoriya Nizhny Novgorod
Energetik Uren	2–0	Torpedo Pavlovo
FC Tyumen	2–0	UralAZ Miass
Uralets Nizhny Tagil	1–2	Uralmash Yekaterinburg
Energiya Chaykovsky	2–0	Spartak Yoshkar-Ola
Sodovik Sterlitamak	0–0 (a.e.t.) (4–1 p)	Neftekhimik Nizhnekamsk

== Fourth round ==
The first round was played between 9 and 26 June 2000, and featured Russian Football National League teams only.

Team 1	Score	Team 2
9 June 2000
Volga Ulyanovsk	2–1	Salyut Saratov
Energetik Uren	1–0	FC Balakovo
Uralmash Yekaterinburg	1–0	FC Tyumen
Sodovik Sterlitamak	3–1	Energiya Chaykovsky
12 June 2000
FC Krasnoznamensk	2–4	Oazis Yartsevo
13 June 2000
Neftyanik Yaroslavl	1–2	FC Khimki
Spartak Lukhovitsy	2–0	Kosmos Elektrostal
FC Oryol	1–0	Lokomotiv Kaluga
24 June 2000
Irtysh Omsk	w/o	Reformatsiya Abakan
Zvezda Irkutsk	1–0	Luch Vladivostok
26 June 2000
Kuban Krasnodar	4–0	SKA Rostov-on-Don
Sudostroitel Astrakhan	2–1	Avtodor Vladikavkaz

== Fifth round ==
Matches were played on 16 July 2000.

16 July 2000	Spartak Lukhovitsy	0–2	Shinnik Yaroslavl	Lukhovitsy
			Bakalets 49'; Zatsepin 81'	Stadium: Spartak Stadium; Attendance: 2,500; Referee: Aleksandr Kabakov (Moscow)

16 July 2000	Oazis Yartsevo	4–4 (a.e.t.) (5–3 p)	Lokomotiv Saint Petersburg	Yartsevo
	Barankov 5', 21', 26'; S. Kovalyov 96'		Klass 20'; Ivanov 67'; Zotikov 82', 102'	Stadium: Trud Stadium; Attendance: 2,800; Referee: Yuriy Makarov (Velikiye Luki)
	Penalties
	Barankov (penalty scored); Minochkyn (penalty scored); S. Kovalyov (penalty scored); V. Kovalyov (penalty scored); Rogulin (penalty scored)		(penalty scored) Kushov; (penalty missed) Klass; (penalty scored) Grigoryev; (penalty scored) Kiselyov

16 July 2000	Baltika Kaliningrad	1–2	FC Khimki	Kaliningrad
	Nizovtsev (penalty missed) 66', 89'		Genich 36' (pen.), 56'	Stadium: Baltika Stadium; Attendance: 7,000; Referee: Sergei Korovkin (Yaroslavl)

16 July 2000	Torpedo-ZIL Moscow	3–1	Kristall Smolensk	Moscow
	Smirnov 18'; Veselovskiy 52'; Lebed 70'		Syarohin 28'	Stadium: Eduard Streltsov Stadium; Attendance: 3,000; Referee: Viktor Kukin (Lipetsk)

16 July 2000	Arsenal Tula	2–1	Spartak-Chukotka Moscow	Tula
	Yablonskyi 56' (pen.); Kuzmichyov 60'		Borisov 90'	Stadium: Arsenal Stadium; Attendance: 3,500; Referee: Andrey Yulgushov (Rostov-on-Don)

16 July 2000	Sudostroitel Astrakhan	1–3	Kuban Krasnodar	Astrakhan
	Bocharnikov 76' (pen.)		Tsatskin 16'; E. Filippov 37'; Kunikhov 43'	Stadium: Sudostroitel Stadium; Attendance: 2,500; Referee: Vladimir Vlasov (Kaluga)

16 July 2000	Zhemchuzhina Sochi	3–2	Spartak Nalchik	Sochi
	Suleymanov 65', 90'; Hetman 88'		Autlev 21'; Gurtuyev 55'	Stadium: Central Stadium; Attendance: 1,000; Referee: Ruslan Kiselyov (Tomsk)

16 July 2000	FC Oryol	0–2	Metallurg Lipetsk	Oryol
			Vekovishchev 85'; Kirimov 87'	Stadium: Central Stadium; Attendance: 8,500; Referee: Nikolay Bychkov (Moscow)

16 July 2000	Nosta Novotroitsk	2–1	Rubin Kazan	Novotroitsk
	Mirochnik 56'; Piskunov 74'		Menshchikov 67'	Stadium: Metallurg Stadium; Attendance: 9,000; Referee: Eduard Malyi (Volgograd)

16 July 2000	Volga Ulyanovsk	1–4	Lada-Tolyatti	Ulyanovsk
	Pichuzhkin 50'		Vereshchak 20'; Cheburaev 37'; Strelkov 88'; Brovin 90'	Stadium: Trud Stadium; Attendance: 6,000; Referee: Aleksey Sergeyev (Moscow)

16 July 2000	Uralmash Yekaterinburg	0–1	Energetik Uren	Yekaterinburg
			Palachyov 75' (o.g.)	Stadium: Central Stadium; Attendance: 6,000; Referee: Vladimir Yevtushenko (Krasnoyarsk)

16 July 2000	Sokol Saratov	4–0	Volgar Astrakhan	Saratov
	Sokolov 23'; Garin 42'; Fedkov 70' (pen.); Zozulya 90'			Stadium: Lokomotiv Stadium; Attendance: 7,000; Referee: Marat Galimov (Yekaterinburg)

16 July 2000	Irtysh Omsk	2–1 (a.e.t.)	Lokomotiv Chita	Omsk
	Malyshev 51'; Bagayev 114'		Kreisman 53'	Stadium: Red Star Stadium; Attendance: 5,000; Referee: Yuriy Ustinov (Pavlovo)

16 July 2000	Amkar Perm	1–0	Metallurg Krasnoyarsk	Perm
	Paramonov 8'			Stadium: Zvezda Stadium; Attendance: 5,500; Referee: Mikhail Gladkiy (Krasnodar)

16 July 2000	Gazovik-Gazprom Izhevsk	2–0	Sodovik Sterlitamak	Izhevsk
	Pyatikopov 65' (pen.); A. Ivanov 80'			Stadium: Dinamo Stadium; Attendance: 6,200; Referee: Sergey Mostovoy (Novosibirsk)

16 July 2000	Tom Tomsk	2–0	Zvezda Irkutsk	Tomsk
	Silyutin 16'; Ageyev 49'			Stadium: Trud Stadium; Attendance: 10,000; Referee: Sergei Puerov (Kurgan)

== Round of 32 ==
7 August 2000	Kuban Krasnodar	4–2	Chernomorets Novorossiysk	Krasnodar
	Jović 20' (o.g.); Berishvili 22'; Kunikhov 37'; Tsatskin 53'		D. Popov 25'; Burdin 74'	Stadium: Kuban Stadium; Attendance: 8,500; Referee: Mikhail Khodyrev (Moscow)

8 September 2000	Nosta Novotroitsk	1–4	Spartak Moscow	Novotroitsk
	Zaikin 86'		Robson 29'; Shirko 54'; Pisarev 69', 82'	Stadium: Metallurg Stadium; Attendance: 10,000; Referee: Yuri Chebotaryov (Krasnodar)

9 September 2000	Tom Tomsk	0–1 (a.e.t.)	Lokomotiv Moscow	Tomsk
			Kharlachov 99'	Stadium: Trud Stadium; Attendance: 14,000; Referee: Sergey Lapochkin (Saint Petersburg)

9 September 2000	Sokol Saratov	6–2	Lokomotiv Nizhny Novgorod	Saratov
	Tereshchenko 15'; Knyazev 14', 18', 57'; Kuznetsov 38'; Zozulya 82'		Alpatov 55'; Aksyonov 60'	Stadium: Lokomotiv Stadium; Attendance: 14,300; Referee: Aleksandr Tyumin (Novocherkassk)

9 September 2000	Energetik Uren	2–1 (a.e.t.)	Alania Vladikavkaz	Uren
	Zinikov 18'; Churakov 115'		Paulo Emilio 67'	Stadium: Energetik Stadium; Attendance: 7,000; Referee: Taras Bezubyak (Saint Petersburg)

9 September 2000	Arsenal Tula	1–1 (a.e.t.) (3–2 p)	Uralan Elista	Tula
	Yablonskiy 13' (pen.)		Jefferson 35'	Stadium: Arsenal Stadium; Attendance: 15,000; Referee: Aleksandr Kolobaev (Moscow)
	Penalties
	Yablonskiy (penalty scored); Stogov (penalty scored); Kutsenko (penalty missed); Kuzmichyov (penalty scored)		(penalty scored) Milekić; (penalty missed) Semochko; (penalty scored) Milá; (penalty missed) Coșelev; (penalty missed) Jefferson

9 September 2000	Torpedo-ZIL Moscow	2–2 (4–5 p)	Dynamo Moscow	Moscow
	B. Ajinjal 53'; Popovici 75'		Medvedev 19', 74'	Stadium: Eduard Streltsov Stadium; Attendance: 7,000; Referee: Andrei Butenko (Moscow)
	Penalties
	B. Ajinjal (penalty scored); Sinyov (penalty scored); Popovici (penalty scored); R. Ajinjal (penalty scored); Kamnev (penalty missed)		(penalty scored) Bystrov; (penalty scored) Shtanyuk; (penalty scored) Medvedev; (penalty scored) Gusev; (penalty scored) Ayupov

10 September 2000	Shinnik Yaroslavl	1–6	CSKA Moscow	Yaroslavl
	Novgorodov 37' (pen.)		Kulik 12', 21', 32'; Bychkov 61'; Savelyev 63'; Kornaukhov 67'	Stadium: Shinnik Stadium; Attendance: 12,000; Referee: Aleksandr Gvardis (Kaliningrad)

10 September 2000	Oazis Yartsevo	1–2 (a.e.t.)	Anzhi Makhachkala	Yartsevo
	Antonenkov 88'		Ranđelović 76' (pen.), 107'	Stadium: Trud Stadium; Attendance: 3,000; Referee: Nikolai Ivanov (Saint Petersburg)

10 September 2000	Zhemchuzhina Sochi	0–1 (a.e.t.)	Krylia Sovetov Samara	Sochi
			Konovalov 104'	Stadium: Central Stadium; Attendance: 2,700; Referee: Sergey Zuev (Moscow)

10 September 2000	Lada-Tolyatti	1–0 (a.e.t.)	Saturn Ramenskoye	Tolyatti
	Khutov 103'			Stadium: Torpedo Stadium; Attendance: 6,500; Referee: Garyafi Zhafyarov (Moscow)

10 September 2000	Irtysh Omsk	2–0	SKA Rostov-on-Don	Omsk
	Nikitenko 2'; Bagayev 81'			Stadium: Red Star Stadium; Attendance: 9,000; Referee: Nikolai Frolov (Ramenskoye)

10 September 2000	Amkar Perm	2–1	Fakel Voronezh	Perm
	Putilin 63'; Akhmetgaliyev 85'		Degtyaryov 89'	Stadium: Zvezda Stadium; Attendance: 16,600; Referee: Sergei Gusev (Tobolsk)

10 September 2000	Gazovik-Gazprom Izhevsk	3–2	Rotor Volgograd	Izhevsk
	Getikov 16'; Muradymov 34'; Pyatikopov 89'		Pavlyuchenko 61'; Krivov 76'	Stadium: Central Stadium; Attendance: 15,000; Referee: Anatoliy Kiselyov (Moscow)

14 September 2000	FC Khimki	1–2	Torpedo Moscow	Khimki
	Kravchuk 31'		Aristarkhov 57'; Rozhkov 89' (o.g.)	Stadium: Novator Stadium; Attendance: 5,000; Referee: Aleksandr Kolobaev (Moscow)

19 September 2000	Metallurg Lipetsk	2–1	Zenit Saint Petersburg	Lipetsk
	Dalaloyan 78'; Nelson 81'		Demenko 3'	Stadium: Metallurg Stadium; Attendance: 9,000; Referee: Anatoliy Kiselyov (Moscow)

== Round of 16 ==
28 October 2000	CSKA Moscow	1–3	Anzhi Makhachkala	Moscow
	Kornaukhov 17'		Adiyev 15', 42'; Sirkhayev 53'	Stadium: Grigory Fedotov Stadium; Attendance: 5,000; Referee: Gennadi Kulichenkov (Tula)

28 October 2000	Energetik Uren	2–2 (a.e.t.) (1–2 p)	Sokol Saratov	Uren
	Lychagov 38'; An. Popov 84'		Fedkov 26'; Nikitin 70'	Stadium: Energetik Stadium; Attendance: 6,000; Referee: Nikolai Ivanov (Saint Petersburg)
	Penalties
	Tsarenko (penalty missed); Babichev (penalty missed); Lychagov (penalty missed); Simakov (penalty scored); Tuzikov (penalty missed)		(penalty missed) Zhidkov; (penalty scored) Fedkov; (penalty missed) Borzenkov; (penalty missed) Sokolov; (penalty scored) Fedotov

29 October 2000	Torpedo Moscow	1–1 (a.e.t.) (5–4 p)	Dynamo Moscow	Moscow
	Zyryanov 15'		Nemov 72'	Stadium: Luzhniki Stadium; Attendance: 2,500; Referee: Sergey Lapochkin (Saint Petersburg)
	Penalties
	Gashkin (penalty scored); Leonchenko (penalty scored); Zyryanov (penalty scored); Kamoltsev (penalty scored); Litvinov (penalty scored)		(penalty scored) Bystrov; (penalty scored) Gusev; (penalty scored) Shtanyuk; (penalty scored) Medvedev; (penalty missed) Ayupov

29 October 2000	Lokomotiv Moscow	5–0	Gazovik-Gazprom Izhevsk	Ramenskoye
	Teryokhin 10'; Evseev 38'; Chugainov 41', 53'; Cherevchenko 88'			Stadium: Saturn Stadium; Attendance: 1,200; Referee: Sergei Andreyev (Novosibirsk)

29 October 2000	Amkar Perm	1–0	Irtysh Omsk	Perm
	Paramonov 20'			Stadium: Zvezda Stadium; Attendance: 7,300; Referee: Aleksandr Gvardis (Kaliningrad)

29 October 2000	Krylia Sovetov Samara	3–0	Metallurg Lipetsk	Samara
	Anyukov 18'; Jokšas 67'; Timashov 74' (o.g.)			Stadium: Metallurg Stadium; Attendance: 7,000; Referee: Yuri Chebotaryov (Krasnodar)

11 November 2000	Kuban Krasnodar	1–1 (a.e.t.) (4–5 p)	Arsenal Tula	Krasnodar
	Yermak 44'		Ivankov 23'	Stadium: Kuban Stadium; Attendance: 12,000; Referee: Aleksandr Kolobaev (Moscow)
	Penalties
	Pantyushenko (penalty scored); Andreyev (penalty missed); E. Filippov (penalty scored); Berishvili (penalty scored); Dulayev (penalty scored)		(penalty scored) Yablonskyi; (penalty scored) Kushnir; (penalty scored) Stogov; (penalty scored) Kuzmichyov; (penalty scored) Yermilov

17 November 2000	Spartak Moscow	4–1	Lada-Tolyatti	Moscow
	Marcão 18', 24'; Lebedkov 31'; Bychkov 61'; Bulatov 79'		Khutov 89'	Stadium: Luzhniki Stadium; Attendance: 1,500; Referee: Yuri Klyuchnikov (Rostov-on-Don)

== Quarter-finals ==
11 April 2001	Anzhi Makhachkala	1–0	Torpedo Moscow	Makhachkala
	Pensée 80'			Stadium: Dynamo Stadium; Attendance: 17,000; Referee: Stanislav Sukhina (Moscow)

11 April 2001	Krylia Sovetov Samara	3–0	Arsenal Tula	Samara
	Ângelo 12'; Bushmanov 47'; Qosimov 64' (pen.)			Stadium: Metallurg Stadium; Attendance: 17,000; Referee: Aleksandr Tyumin (Novocherkassk)

11 April 2001	Spartak Moscow	1–3	Sokol Saratov	Moscow
	Pisarev 60'		Fedkov 61', 65', 73'	Stadium: Luzhniki Stadium; Attendance: 4,000; Referee: Nikolai Frolov (Ramenskoye)

11 April 2001	Lokomotiv Moscow	0–0 (a.e.t.) (3–1 p)	Amkar Perm	Ramenskoye
				Stadium: Saturn Stadium; Attendance: 1,500; Referee: Yuri Klyuchnikov (Rostov-on-Don)
	Penalties
	Loskov (penalty missed); Ignashevich (penalty scored); Chugainov (penalty missed); Izmailov (penalty scored); Buznikin (penalty scored)		(penalty scored) Paramonov; (penalty missed) Khuzin; (penalty missed) Al. Popov; (penalty missed) Al. Filippov

== Semi-finals ==
16 May 2001	Anzhi Makhachkala	2–1	Krylia Sovetov Samara	Makhachkala
	Adiyev 49'; Ranđelović 70'		Ângelo 66'	Stadium: Dynamo Stadium; Attendance: 17,000; Referee: Valentin Ivanov (Moscow)

16 May 2001	Sokol Saratov	0–1	Lokomotiv Moscow	Saratov
			Evseev 90'	Stadium: Lokomotiv Stadium; Attendance: 15,000; Referee: Nikolai Ivanov (Saint Petersburg)

== Final ==
20 June 2001
17:30 UTC+4

Lokomotiv Moscow	1–1 (a.e.t.)	Anzhi Makhachkala
Janashia 90+4'		Sirkhayev 90'
Penalties
Izmailov (penalty scored); Lekgetho (penalty scored); Chugainov (penalty missed); Maminov (penalty scored); Loskov (penalty scored)	4–3	(penalty scored) Agalarov; (penalty missed) Akayev; (penalty scored) Sirkhayev; (penalty missed) Rahimić; (penalty scored) Yaskovich

Dinamo Stadium, Moscow
Attendance: 8,000
Referee: Valentin Ivanov (Moscow)

Lokomotiv Moscow:
GK	(Russia) Ruslan Nigmatullin
DF	(Russia) Gennadiy Nizhegorodov
DF	(Russia) Dmitri Sennikov
DF	(South Africa) Jacob Lekgetho
DF	(Russia) Vadim Evseev (substituted off) 91'
DF	(Russia) Igor Chugainov
MF	(Russia) Marat Izmailov
MF	(Uzbekistan) Vladimir Maminov
MF	(Nigeria) James Obiorah (substituted off) 75'
MF	(Russia) Dmitri Loskov
FW	(Russia) Maksim Buznikin (substituted off) 46'
Substitutes:
MF	(Georgia (country)) Zaza Janashia (substituted on) 46'
MF	(Armenia) Albert Sarkisyan (substituted on) 75'
DF	(Belarus) Andrei Lavrik (substituted on) 91'
Manager:
(Russia) Yuri Semin

Anzhi Makhachkala:
GK	(Russia) Sergey Armishev
MF	(Russia) Denis Peremenin
DF	(Belarus) Syarhey Yaskovich
DF	(Cameroon) Michel Pensée
DF	(Federal Republic of Yugoslavia) Nebojša Stojković (substituted off) 91'
MF	(Bosnia and Herzegovina) Elvir Rahimić
MF	(Russia) Ruslan Agalarov
MF	(Russia) Narvik Sirkhayev
FW	(Russia) Magomed Adiyev (substituted off) 75'
FW	(Russia) Murad Ramazanov
FW	(Federal Republic of Yugoslavia) Predrag Ranđelović (substituted off) 90'
Substitutes:
FW	(Russia) Valery Alekseyev (substituted on) 75'
DF	(Russia) Anatoli Tebloyev (substituted on) 90'
DF	(Russia) Arsen Akayev (substituted on) 91'
Manager:
(Russia) Gadzhi Gadzhiyev

MATCH RULES

- 90 minutes.
- 30 minutes of extra-time if necessary.
- Penalty shootout if scores still level.
- Seven named substitutes
- Maximum of 3 substitutions.
