= 2001–02 Russian Cup =

Tournament details
- Country: Russia

Final positions
- Champions: CSKA Moscow
- Runners-up: Zenit Saint Petersburg

The 2001–02 Russian Cup was the tenth season of the Russian football knockout tournament since the dissolution of Soviet Union.

The tournament was won by CSKA Moscow who beat Zenit Saint Petersburg in the final with 2–0.

== First round ==
Team 1	Score	Team 2
24 March 2001
Sudostroitel Astrakhan	1–2	Dynamo Makhachkala
FC Mozdok	3–1	Avtodor Vladikavkaz
FC Krasnodar-2000	2–0	Slavyansk Slavyansk-na-Kubani
Druzhba Maykop	0–1	Zhemchuzhina Sochi
Angusht Nazran	0–1	Terek Grozny
Venets Gulkevichi	3–0	Lokomotiv-Taym Mineralnye Vody
Spartak-Kavkaztransgas Izobilny	2–1	Dynamo Stavropol
Spartak Anapa	1–2	Vityaz Krymsk
SKA Rostov-on-Don	3–2	Shakhtyor Shakhty
Nart Nartkala	1–0 (a.e.t.)	Kavkazkabel Prokhladny
17 April 2001
Biokhimik-Mordovia Saransk	0–2	Svetotekhnika Saransk
Torpedo-Viktoriya Nizhny Novgorod	1–1 (a.e.t.) (4–2 p)	Torpedo Pavlovo
Spartak Yoshkar-Ola	0–1	Elektronika Nizhny Novgorod
Sibur-Khimik Dzerzhinsk	0–1	Metallurg Vyksa
Olimpia Volgograd	2–1	Torpedo Volzhsky
Khopyor Balashov	1–0	FC Balakovo
Iskra Engels	2–0	Salyut Saratov
Diana Volzhsk	1–1 (a.e.t.) (4–5 p)	Lada-Energiya Dimitrovgrad
19 April 2001
Spartak-Telekom Shuya	3–1	Spartak Kostroma
Spartak Tambov	3–1	Metallurg Lipetsk
Dynamo Saint Petersburg	2–1 (a.e.t.)	Svetogorets Svetogorsk
Vityaz Podolsk	2–1 (a.e.t.)	Don Novomoskovsk
Sportakademklub Moscow	5–1	Oazis Yartsevo
Spartak Lukhovitsy	0–0 (a.e.t.) (1–3 p)	Ryazan-Agrokomplekt
FC Pskov-2000	2–0	Krivichi Velikiye Luki
Neftyanik Yaroslavl	1–2	Dynamo Vologda
Mosenergo Moscow	3–0	Spartak Shchyolkovo
Lotto-MKM Moscow	1–0	Nika Moscow
Lokomotiv Liski	1–0	FC Yelets
Kosmos Elektrostal	0–1	Spartak-Orekhovo
FC Rybinsk	0–2	Severstal Cherepovets
FC Oryol	0–0 (a.e.t.) (4–1 p)	Dynamo Bryansk
FC Krasnoznamensk	1–2	Titan Reutov
Fabus Bronnitsy	2–1	FC Kolomna
Avangard Kursk	1–1 (a.e.t.) (3–4 p)	Salyut-Energiya Belgorod
Arsenal-2 Tula	0–2	Lokomotiv Kaluga
Avtomobilist Noginsk	1–2 (a.e.t.)	Torpedo Vladimir
20 April 2001
Lokomotiv Saint Petersburg	0–0 (a.e.t.) (4–3 p)	Volochanin-89 Vyshny Volochyok
25 April 2001
Chkalovets-1936 Novosibirsk	2–0	Dynamo Omsk
Zenit Chelyabinsk	3–1	Uralets Nizhny Tagil
Uralmash Yekaterinburg	2–0	FC Berezniki
UralAZ Miass	3–0	Spartak Kurgan
Sodovik Sterlitamak	2–1	Metallurg-Metiznik Magnitogorsk
Sibiryak Bratsk	0–1	Chkalovets-Olimpik Novosibirsk
Selenga Ulan-Ude	1–2 (a.e.t.)	Zvezda Irkutsk
Okean Nakhodka	1–0	Luch Vladivostok
Kuzbass-Dynamo Kemerovo	3–0	Shakhtyor Prokopjewsk
Gazovik Orenburg	0–1	Nosta Novotroitsk
FC Tyumen	1–0	Irtysh Omsk
Energiya Chaykovsky	0–1	Dynamo Izhevsk
Dynamo Perm	1–3	Dynamo-Mashinostroitel Kirov
Dynamo Barnaul	1–0	Metallurg-Zabsib Novokuznetsk
Amur Blagoveshchensk	0–1	SKA-Energiya Khabarovsk
KAMAZ Naberezhnye Chelny	2–0	Alnas Almetyevsk

== Second round ==
Team 1	Score	Team 2
6 April 2001
Vityaz Krymsk	0–0 (a.e.t.) (5–4 p)	Zhemchuzhina Sochi
Venets Gulkevichi	2–1	FC Mozdok
Terek Grozny	2–0	Nart Nartkala
SKA Rostov-on-Don	3–2	FC Krasnodar-2000
Dynamo Makhachkala	1–2	Spartak-Kavkaztransgas Izobilny
25 April 2001
Volga Ulyanovsk	1–0	Khopyor Balashov
Svetotekhnika Saransk	4–0	Lada-Energiya Dimitrovgrad
Metallurg Vyksa	2–0	Torpedo-Viktoriya Nizhny Novgorod
Iskra Engels	1–0	Olimpia Volgograd
Elektronika Nizhny Novgorod	1–1 (a.e.t.) (5–6 p)	Energetik Uren
11 May 2001
Lotto-MKM Moscow	0–1	Mosenergo Moscow
Titan Reutov	2–0	Vityaz Podolsk
Sportakademklub Moscow	1–1 (a.e.t.) (4–5 p)	FC Pskov-2000
Spartak-Orekhovo	0–1 (a.e.t.)	Fabus Bronnitsy
Severstal Cherepovets	0–0 (a.e.t.) (3–5 p)	Dynamo Vologda
Salyut-Energiya Belgorod	2–1	Ryazan-Agrokomplekt
Lokomotiv Liski	1–0	Spartak Tambov
Lokomotiv Kaluga	1–0	FC Oryol
Dynamo Saint Petersburg	1–0	Lokomotiv Saint Petersburg
Torpedo Vladimir	1–2	Spartak-Telekom Shuya
16 May 2001
Zenit Chelyabinsk	0–1 (a.e.t.)	UralAZ Miass
SKA-Energiya Khabarovsk	0–1	Okean Nakhodka
Nosta Novotroitsk	1–0	Sodovik Sterlitamak
FC Tyumen	5–1	Chkalovets-1936 Novosibirsk
Dynamo-Mashinostroitel Kirov	0–1	Uralmash Yekaterinburg
Dynamo Izhevsk	1–4 (a.e.t.)	KAMAZ Naberezhnye Chelny
Dynamo Barnaul	2–0	Kuzbass-Dynamo Kemerovo
Chkalovets-Olimpik Novosibirsk	2–1	Zvezda Irkutsk

== Third round ==
Team 1	Score	Team 2
5 June 2001
Chkalovets-Olimpik Novosibirsk	4–1	Okean Nakhodka
6 June 2001
UralAZ Miass	1–1 (a.e.t.) (2–4 p)	Nosta Novotroitsk
KAMAZ Naberezhnye Chelny	5–1	Uralmash Yekaterinburg
FC Tyumen	3–1	Dynamo Barnaul
8 June 2001
Vityaz Krymsk	2–0	SKA Rostov-on-Don
Terek Grozny	3–5	Venets Gulkevichi
Svetotekhnika Saransk	1–0	Volga Ulyanovsk
Spartak-Kavkaztransgas Izobilny	3–1 (a.e.t.)	Iskra Engels
Energetik Uren	3–2	Metallurg Vyksa
10 June 2001
Titan Reutov	0–1 (a.e.t.)	Mosenergo Moscow
Salyut-Energiya Belgorod	2–0	Lokomotiv Liski
FC Pskov-2000	2–2 (a.e.t.) (3–1 p)	Dynamo Saint Petersburg
Lokomotiv Kaluga	3–1 (a.e.t.)	Fabus Bronnitsy
Dynamo Vologda	1–0	Spartak-Telekom Shuya

== Fourth round ==
Team 1	Score	Team 2
30 June 2001
Venets Gulkevichi	0–1	Uralan Elista
Spartak-Kavkaztransgas Izobilny	0–1	Rubin Kazan
Salyut-Energiya Belgorod	1–0	Volgar-Gazprom Astrakhan
FC Pskov-2000	0–2	FC Khimki
Nosta Novotroitsk	3–3 (a.e.t.) (4–3 p)	Chkalovets-Olimpik Novosibirsk
Mosenergo Moscow	2–3	Shinnik Yaroslavl
Metallurg Krasnoyarsk	2–3	Amkar Perm
Lokomotiv Kaluga	1–0	Vityaz Krymsk
Lokomotiv Chita	1–2	Gazovik-Gazprom Izhevsk
Lada-Tolyatti	4–1	Lokomotiv Nizhny Novgorod
Kuban Krasnodar	1–0	Spartak Nalchik
KAMAZ Naberezhnye Chelny	0–0 (a.e.t.) (4–5 p)	Svetotekhnika Saransk
FC Tyumen	0–1	Tom Tomsk
Energetik Uren	1–2	Neftekhimik Nizhnekamsk
Dynamo Vologda	1–2	Kristall Smolensk
Arsenal Tula	1–0	Baltika Kaliningrad

== Round of 32 ==
Team 1	Score	Team 2
21 August 2001
Shinnik Yaroslavl	1–0	Spartak Moscow
8 September 2001
FC Khimki	2–2 (a.e.t.) (2–4 p)	Anzhi Makhachkala
Neftekhimik Nizhnekamsk	0–3	Torpedo-ZIL Moscow
Kuban Krasnodar	2–0	Chernomorets Novorossiysk
Gazovik-Gazprom Izhevsk	3–1	Rotor Volgograd
Kristall Smolensk	2–3	Dynamo Moscow
Amkar Perm	3–0	Torpedo Moscow
9 September 2001
Svetotekhnika Saransk	0–2	CSKA Moscow
Lada-Tolyatti	2–1	Alania Vladikavkaz
Nosta Novotroitsk	3–2	Rostselmash Rostov
Lokomotiv Kaluga	0–3	Zenit Saint Petersburg
Salyut-Energiya Belgorod	0–2	Krylia Sovetov Samara
Tom Tomsk	0–1	Sokol Saratov
Rubin Kazan	1–0	Fakel Voronezh
Arsenal Tula	0–2 (a.e.t.)	Saturn Ramenskoye
20 October 2001
Uralan Elista	2–1	Lokomotiv Moscow

== Round of 16 ==
Team 1	Score	Team 2
20 September 2001
Zenit Saint Petersburg	3–2	Kuban Krasnodar
13 October 2001
Dynamo Moscow	5–0	Anzhi Makhachkala
16 October 2001
Saturn Ramenskoye	0–0 (a.e.t.) (5–4 p)	Shinnik Yaroslavl
Amkar Perm	4–1	Nosta Novotroitsk
Sokol Saratov	2–1	Gazovik-Gazprom Izhevsk
CSKA Moscow	2–1	Rubin Kazan
17 October 2001
Torpedo-ZIL Moscow	0–0 (a.e.t.) (4–2 p)	Lada-Tolyatti
4 November 2001
Krylia Sovetov Samara	1–0	Uralan Elista

== Quarter-finals ==
Team 1	Score	Team 2
3 April 2002
Zenit Saint Petersburg	1–0 (a.e.t.)	Krylia Sovetov Samara
Torpedo-ZIL Moscow	0–1	CSKA Moscow
Sokol Saratov	1–2	Amkar Perm
Dynamo Moscow	0–1	Saturn Ramenskoye

== Semi-finals ==
Team 1	Score	Team 2
25 April 2002
Saturn Ramenskoye	0–1 (a.e.t.)	Zenit Saint Petersburg
CSKA Moscow	1–0	Amkar Perm

== Final ==
12 May 2002
16:00 UTC+4

CSKA Moscow	2–0	Zenit Saint Petersburg
Solomatin 30'; Yanovsky 52'

Luzhniki Stadium, Moscow
Attendance: 48,000
Referee: Yuriy Chebotaryov (Krasnodar)
