= 1999–2000 Russian Cup =

Tournament details
- Country: Russia

Final positions
- Champions: Lokomotiv Moscow
- Runners-up: CSKA Moscow

The 1999–2000 Russian Cup was the eighth season of the Russian football knockout tournament since the dissolution of Soviet Union.

The tournament was won by Lokomotiv Moscow who beat CSKA Moscow in the final with 1–0 after extra time.

== First round ==
Team 1	Score	Team 2
25 April 1999
Iskra Engels	2–1	FC Balakovo
26 April 1999
Beshtau Lermontov	1–1 (a.e.t.) (3–2 p)	Nart Nartkala
28 April 1999
Zvezda Irkutsk	3–2 (a.e.t.)	Selenga Ulan-Ude
Uralmash Yekaterinburg	0–2	Zenit Chelyabinsk
Reformatsiya Abakan	2–0	Sibiryak Bratsk
Okean Nakhodka	0–1	Luch Vladivostok
Neftyanik Pokhvistnevo	3–2	Sodovik Sterlitamak
Neftekhimik Nizhnekamsk	1–0	KAMAZ Naberezhnye Chelny
Metallurg-Metisnik Magnitogorsk	1–1 (a.e.t.) (2–1 p)	UralAZ Miass
Kuzbass Kemerovo	0–0 (a.e.t.) (3–4 p)	Zarya Leninsk-Kuznetsky
Irtysh Tobolsk	2–0	FC Kurgan
Gazovik Orenburg	0–1	Nosta Novotroitsk
Energiya Chaykovsky	1–2 (a.e.t.)	Dynamo Izhevsk
Dynamo Perm	1–0	Uralets Nizhny Tagil
Dynamo Barnaul	1–3	Metallurg Novokuznetsk
Chkalovets Novosibirsk	w/o	Samotlor-XXI Nizhnevartovsk
Amur-Energiya Blagoveshchensk	3–2	SKA-Khabarovsk
Irtysh Omsk	0–1	Dynamo Omsk
29 April 1999
Arsenal-2 Tula	0–0 (a.e.t.) (3–5 p)	Don Novomoskovsk

== Second round ==
Team 1	Score	Team 2
7 May 1999
Zenit Penza	1–0	Salyut Saratov
Metallurg Vyksa	3–1	FC Arzamas
Lada-Tolyatti	1–0	Volga Ulyanovsk
Khimik Dzerzhinsk	1–0 (a.e.t.)	Torpedo Pavlovo
Iskra Engels	1–0	Torpedo Volzhsky
Energiya Ulyanovsk	1–0	Diana Volzhsk
Energetik Uren	2–0	Dynamo-Mashinostroitel Kirov
Biokhimik-Mordovia Saransk	0–0 (a.e.t.) (7–6 p)	Svetotekhnika Saransk
8 May 1999
Venets Gulkevichi	1–2	Torpedo Taganrog
Torpedo Vladimir	1–3	Spartak-Chukotka Moscow
Titan Zheleznodorozhny	0–2	Avtomobilist Noginsk
Sportakademklub Moscow	3–0	Volga Tver
Spartak-Peresvet Bryansk	0–1	Mosenergo Moscow
Spartak Tambov	1–0 (a.e.t.)	Lokomotiv Liski
Spartak Shchyolkovo	0–1	Kosmos Elektrostal
Spartak Ryazan	2–0	Spartak Lukhovitsy
SKA Rostov-on-Don	2–0	Shakhtyor Shakhty
Oazis Yartsevo	2–1	Energiya Velikiye Luki
Neftyanik Yaroslavl	1–2 (a.e.t.)	FC Khimki
Kuban Krasnodar	1–0	Slavyansk Slavyansk-na-Kubani
Kavkazkabel Prokhladny	1–2	Beshtau Lermontov
FC Mozdok	1–0	Torpedo Georgiyevsk
FC Kolomna	4–0	Fabus Bronnitsy
Dynamo Vologda	3–0	Spartak Kostroma
Dynamo Saint Petersburg	3–0	Volochanin-89 Vyshny Volochyok
Dynamo Bryansk	1–0	FC Oryol
Druzhba Maykop	3–0	Vityaz Krymsk
Don Novomoskovsk	2–1	Lokomotiv Kaluga
Avtodor Vladikavkaz	1–0	Iriston Vladikavkaz
Avangard Kursk	2–0	Salyut-YUKOS Belgorod
Angusht Nazran	3–0	Dynamo Makhachkala
9 May 1999
Zvezda Irkutsk	2–0	Reformatsiya Abakan
Zenit Chelyabinsk	2–0	Dynamo Perm
Zarya Leninsk-Kuznetsky	2–2 (a.e.t.) (4–5 p)	Metallurg Novokuznetsk
Nosta Novotroitsk	4–0	Neftyanik Pokhvistnevo
Neftekhimik Nizhnekamsk	3–0	Dynamo Izhevsk
Luch Vladivostok	1–4	Amur-Energiya Blagoveshchensk
Irtysh Tobolsk	1–3	Metallurg-Metisnik Magnitogorsk
Dynamo Omsk	1–0	Samotlor-XXI Nizhnevartovsk

== Third round ==
Team 1	Score	Team 2
21 May 1999
Zvezda Irkutsk	3–2 (a.e.t.)	Amur-Energiya Blagoveshchensk
Zenit Chelyabinsk	0–2	Metallurg-Metisnik Magnitogorsk
Neftekhimik Nizhnekamsk	1–1 (a.e.t.) (3–0 p)	Nosta Novotroitsk
Metallurg Novokuznetsk	2–1	Dynamo Omsk
25 May 1999
Lada-Tolyatti	2–0	Biokhimik-Mordovia Saransk
Khimik Dzerzhinsk	1–2	Energiya Ulyanovsk
Iskra Engels	4–0	Zenit Penza
Energetik Uren	1–0	Metallurg Vyksa
26 May 1999
Torpedo Taganrog	0–1	Druzhba Maykop
Sportakademklub Moscow	1–3	Dynamo Saint Petersburg
Spartak-Telekom Shuya	0–3	Spartak-Chukotka Moscow
SKA Rostov-on-Don	1–2	Kuban Krasnodar
Mosenergo Moscow	1–0 (a.e.t.)	Oazis Yartsevo
FC Mozdok	0–2	Avtodor Vladikavkaz
FC Kolomna	2–3 (a.e.t.)	Spartak Ryazan
FC Khimki	4–3	Dynamo Vologda
Don Novomoskovsk	1–1 (a.e.t.) (3–1 p)	Dynamo Bryansk
Avtomobilist Noginsk	0–1	Kosmos Elektrostal
Avangard Kursk	1–1 (a.e.t.) (4–3 p)	Spartak Tambov
Angusht Nazran	3–1	Beshtau Lermontov

== Fourth round ==
Team 1	Score	Team 2
7 June 1999
Lada-Tolyatti	3–0	Iskra Engels
Energetik Uren	3–0	Energiya Ulyanovsk
Zvezda Irkutsk	1–0	Metallurg Novokuznetsk
Spartak-Chukotka Moscow	1–0 (a.e.t.)	Spartak Ryazan
Mosenergo Moscow	2–2 (a.e.t.) (4–3 p)	Kosmos Elektrostal
Metallurg-Metisnik Magnitogorsk	0–3	Neftekhimik Nizhnekamsk
FC Khimki	2–0	Dynamo Saint Petersburg
Druzhba Maykop	2–0 (a.e.t.)	Kuban Krasnodar
Don Novomoskovsk	3–0	Avangard Kursk
Angusht Nazran	0–1	Avtodor Vladikavkaz

== Fifth round ==
Team 1	Score	Team 2
28 June 1999
Zvezda Irkutsk	1–2	Tom Tomsk
Torpedo-ZIL Moscow	0–1	Spartak-Chukotka Moscow
Spartak Nalchik	3–1	Lada-Simbirsk Dimitrovgrad
Sokol Saratov	8–1	Druzhba Maykop
Rubin Kazan	1–3	Arsenal Tula
Neftekhimik Nizhnekamsk	1–2	Amkar Perm
Mosenergo Moscow	2–1	Spartak-Orekhovo
Metallurg Lipetsk	2–0	Energetik Uren
Metallurg Krasnoyarsk	0–3	Lokomotiv Chita
Lada-Tolyatti	3–0	Don Novomoskovsk
Gazovik Orenburg	2–1	FC Tyumen
FC Khimki	1–2 (a.e.t.)	Lokomotiv Saint Petersburg
Fakel Voronezh	2–1	Torpedo-Viktoriya Nizhny Novgorod
Dynamo Stavropol	4–0	Volgar-Gazprom Astrakhan
Baltika Kaliningrad	4–0	Kristall Smolensk
Anzhi Makhachkala	4–0	Avtodor Vladikavkaz

== Round of 32 ==
Team 1	Score	Team 2
18 July 1999
Lada-Tolyatti	0–2	Spartak Moscow
12 October 1999
Metallurg Lipetsk	1–0	Alania Vladikavkaz
Anzhi Makhachkala	3–1	Torpedo Moscow
Tom Tomsk	0–5	CSKA Moscow
Spartak Nalchik	4–0	Zhemchuzhina Sochi
Spartak-Chukotka Moscow	1–0	Lokomotiv Nizhny Novgorod
Lokomotiv Chita	0–1	Uralan Elista
Gazovik-Gazprom Izhevsk	2–1	Zenit Saint Petersburg
Amkar Perm	2–2 (a.e.t.) (4–5 p)	Rotor Volgograd
Mosenergo Moscow	0–0 (a.e.t.) (5–6 p)	Dynamo Moscow
Lokomotiv Saint Petersburg	1–5	Lokomotiv Moscow
Fakel Voronezh	3–2 (a.e.t.)	Rostselmash Rostov
Dynamo Stavropol	2–1 (a.e.t.)	Chernomorets Novorossiysk
Sokol Saratov	1–0	Shinnik Yaroslavl
Arsenal Tula	1–3	Saturn Ramenskoye
30 October 1999
Baltika Kaliningrad	2–0	Krylia Sovetov Samara

== Round of 16 ==
Team 1	Score	Team 2
13 November 1999
Metallurg Lipetsk	4–0	Dynamo Stavropol
CSKA Moscow	3–0	Spartak-Chukotka Moscow
Uralan Elista	3–0	Fakel Voronezh
Lokomotiv Moscow	2–1	Baltika Kaliningrad
Anzhi Makhachkala	2–0	Gazovik-Gazprom Izhevsk
14 November 1999
Dynamo Moscow	1–0 (a.e.t.)	Spartak Nalchik
21 March 2000
Sokol Saratov	0–1 (a.e.t.)	Spartak Moscow
Rotor Volgograd	0–1	Saturn Ramenskoye

== Quarter-finals ==
Team 1	Score	Team 2
4 April 2000
Spartak Moscow	1–0	Saturn Ramenskoye
5 April 2000
Metallurg Lipetsk	1–2	Lokomotiv Moscow
11 April 2000
Anzhi Makhachkala	1–1 (a.e.t.) (4–5 p)	CSKA Moscow
12 April 2000
Uralan Elista	1–0	Dynamo Moscow

== Semi-finals ==
Team 1	Score	Team 2
3 May 2000
Uralan Elista	1–4 (a.e.t.)	Lokomotiv Moscow
4 May 2000
CSKA Moscow	3–1	Spartak Moscow

== Final ==
21 May 2000
17:00 UTC+4

Lokomotiv Moscow	3–2 (a.e.t.)	CSKA Moscow
Yevseyev 41'; Bulykin 96'; Tsymbalar 113'		Semak 32'; Kornaukhov 120'

Dynamo Stadium, Moscow
Attendance: 26,000
Referee: Nikolai Levnikov (Saint Petersburg)
