= Jacob Lekgetho =

South African soccer player (1974-2008)

Personal information
- Full name: Jacob Bobo Lekgetho
- Date of birth: 24 March 1974
- Place of birth: Soweto, South Africa
- Date of death: 9 September 2008 (aged 34)
- Place of death: Johannesburg, South Africa
- Height: 1.78 m (5 ft 10 in)
- Position: Left back

Senior career*
Years	Team	Apps	(Gls)
1995–2001	Moroka Swallows	144	(10)
2001–2005	Lokomotiv Moscow	76	(3)

International career
2000–2004	South Africa	25	(0)
- * Club domestic league appearances and goals

Jacob Bobo Lekgetho (24 March 1974 – 9 September 2008) was a South African footballer who played as a left back during the 1990s and 2000s.

== Career ==
Lekgetho was born in the Moletsane area of Soweto and began playing professionally with Moroka Swallows FC in 1995. He went on to make 155 appearances for the club before leaving for FC Lokomotiv Moscow in early 2001. He quickly became manager Yuri Syomin's first choice at left-back in the 5–3–2 formation and kept his position until his departure in 2004. He helped the club win the league title in 2002 and played over 20 games in the UEFA Champions League with Lokomotiv, scoring two goals in the qualifying stages of the tournament in 2001 and 2002. In June 2004, during the summer season break in Russia, he suspended his contract with the club and returned to South Africa, citing family situation.

For the two seasons in Moscow, he was also teammates with his compatriot Bennett Mnguni.

He was capped 25 times for the South African national team, making his international debut in a 1–0 win over Malta in May 2000 and playing his last match for Bafana Bafana in a 0-3 World Cup Qualifying defeat to Ghana in Kumasi on 20 June 2004. He was a member of the squad at the 2002 FIFA World Cup in South Korea and Japan where he came on as a substitute in the 2–3 defeat to Spain.

== Style of play ==
At Lokomotiv Moscow, Lekgetho was one of the few left-footed players and immediately became a starter as a left full-back or wing-back in the 5–3–2 formation used by the long-term manager Yuri Syomin. Despite the team's football being predominantly defensive in nature, full-backs were allowed to go forward and create chances for attacking players. He was often supported by the Russian internationals Dmitri Sennikov at left center-back and Vadim Yevseyev at the opposite flank in a similar position.

== Honors ==
- Russian Premier League : 2002, 2004
- Russian Cup (football) : 2000–01
- Russian Super Cup : 2003

== Death ==
=== Hoax ===
On 19 February 2007, Russian web-based news source Rusfootball and Russian edition of the UEFA website reported that Lekgetho had been killed in a car accident in Cape Town. Other media such as gazeta.ru, Sport-Express, and Regnum picked up the story. On 20 February, Rusfootball published the refutation, confirming that the information was false.

=== Actual death ===
In September 2008, it was confirmed by various South African sources that Lekgetho had died in Johannesburg, aged 34, after a lengthy battle with an undisclosed illness. According to Sport-Express the illness was AIDS.
