= Boris Nikitin (footballer) =

Russian footballer

Personal information
- Full name: Boris Yuryevich Nikitin
- Date of birth: 11 August 1967 (age 59)
- Place of birth: Leningrad, Russian SFSR
- Height: 1.70 m (5 ft 7 in)
- Positions: Forward; midfielder

Youth career
- FC Svetlana Leningrad

Senior career*
Years	Team	Apps	(Gls)
1985	FC Zenit Leningrad	0	(0)
1986	FC Dynamo Leningrad	2	(0)
1986–1987	FC Zenit Leningrad	1	(0)
1988–1989	FC Dynamo Leningrad	66	(3)
1989	FC Zenit Leningrad	0	(0)
1990–1991	FC Fakel Voronezh	76	(14)
1992	FC Lokomotiv Moscow	8	(0)
1992	→ FC Lokomotiv-d Moscow (loan)	4	(0)
1992–1995	FC Saturn-1991 Saint Petersburg	86	(14)
1996	FC Lokomotiv-Saturn Saint Petersburg	11	(1)
1996	→ FC Lokomotiv-d St. Petersburg (loan)	4	(1)
1997–1998	FC Dynamo-SPb Saint Petersburg	24	(3)
- * Club domestic league appearances and goals

Boris Yuryevich Nikitin (Russian: Борис Юрьевич Никитин; born 11 August 1967) is a former Russian football player.
