= Vladimir Kuzhelev =

Russian footballer

Personal information
- Full name: Vladimir Egorovich Kuzhelev
- Date of birth: 29 April 1974 (age 52)
- Place of birth: Bryansk Oblast, Russian SFSR
- Height: 1.71 m (5 ft 7 1/2 in)
- Position: Midfielder

Senior career*
Years	Team	Apps	(Gls)
1991–1997	Dynamo Bryansk	157	(20)
1998	Energia Uren	31	(1)
1999	Torpedo-Kadino Mogilev	11	(4)
1999–2000	Volyn Lutsk	30	(5)
2002	Prykarpattya Ivano-Frankivsk	1	(0)
2002	Dynamo Bryansk	9	(0)
2003	Lukoil Chelyabinsk	3	(0)
2004	Amur Blagoveshchensk	14	(0)
- * Club domestic league appearances and goals

Vladimir Egorovich Kuzhelev (Russian: Владимир Егорович Кужелев; born 29 April 1974) is a former Russian football player.

== Club career ==
In 1991, he made his debut for FC Dynamo Bryansk. Kuzhelev also played for FC Energia Uren, FC Lukoil Chelyabinsk and FC Amur Blagoveshchensk in Russia, FC Torpedo-Kadino Mogilev in Belarus, FC Volyn Lutsk and FC Prykarpattya Ivano-Frankivsk of Ukraine.

== Honours ==
- Russian Second Division runner-up: 2003, 2004.
