= Malkhaz Asatiani =

Georgian footballer (born 1981)

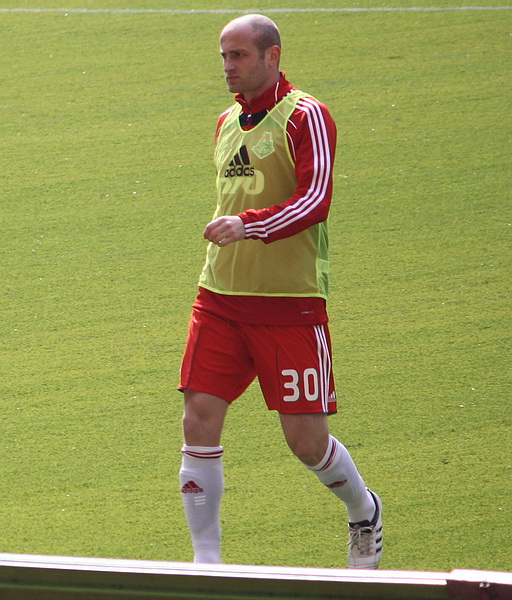

Personal information
- Date of birth: 4 August 1981 (age 45)
- Place of birth: Kutaisi, Georgian SSR, Soviet Union
- Height: 1.84 m (6 ft 0 in)
- Positions: Centre-back; defensive midfielder

Youth career
- 1997–1999: Torpedo Kutaisi

Senior career*
Years	Team	Apps	(Gls)
1999–2003	Torpedo Kutaisi	76	(15)
2003–2010	Lokomotiv Moscow	125	(6)
2008–2009	→ Dynamo Kyiv (loan)	11	(0)
Total		212	(21)

International career
1997–2003	Georgia U21	18	(2)
2001–2010	Georgia	42	(4)
- * Club domestic league appearances and goals

Malkhaz Asatiani (Georgian: მალხაზ ასათიანი; born 4 August 1981) is a Georgian former professional footballer who played as a defender.

== Club career ==
His club career started in Torpedo Kutaisi. During his stay of three and a half years the team won the Georgian league title three consecutive seasons.

In the summer of 2003, while having recently had scored a winning goal for Georgia against Russia at the international level, Asatiani received and agreed to an offer from Lokomotiv Moscow. Initially signed as an attacking player, Asatiani was soon converted by the club's head coach Yuri Syomin into a central defender or a defensive midfielder. However, during the 2005 season, he returned to playing up the pitch due to injury crisis among the attacking players. In the 2004 season, following the transfer of Sergey Ignashevich to cross-city rivals CSKA Moscow, Asatiani became one of the starting defenders, often partnering Dmitriy Sennikov in central defense.

On 3 December. Asatiani told the Russian newspaper, Sport-Express, that he will be leaving Lokomotiv in the end of 2010 on a free transfer. On 21 December the departure was made official.

In August 2008, Asatiani was bought on a half-year loan by Dynamo Kyiv.

== International career ==
For the National Team, Malkhaz has played 18 international matches and scored 4 goals since his debut in 2001. One of the goals came against rivals Russia in a Euro 2004 qualifying match, something for which Asatiani received praise. He also scored important goals in the 2006 World Cup qualifying phase.

== Style of play and reception ==
Asatiani had been attacking midfielder in his early professional career at Torpedo Kutaisi before Lokomotiv Moscow's manager Yuri Syomin converted him into a ball-playing center-back due to his physique and the ability to recover possession and accurately pass the ball over long distances. When playing as a defender, he was also allowed to go up the pitch to participate in the attacking play and, at times, started games in his original role of a midfielder or even as a forward. His passing, dribbling, technical skills and an eye for decisive goals made him a versatile and valuable player for both the club and the national team. Despite his talent, he was unable to continue his career as a player past the age of 29 due to recurring injuries.

In a 2024 interview, former long-term Lokomotiv Moscow manager Yuri Syomin named Asatiani one of the best defenders in the Russian Premier League during the 2000s as well as one of the most disciplined foreign players in Moscow-based clubs.

== Career statistics ==
=== Club ===
Appearances and goals by club, season and competition
Club	Season	League		Cup		Europe		Total	
Club	Season	Apps	Goals	Apps	Goals	Apps	Goals	Apps	Goals
Torpedo Kutaisi	1999–2000	13	3	0	0	0	0	13	3
Torpedo Kutaisi	2000–01	23	5	0	0	0	0	23	5
Torpedo Kutaisi	2001–02	25	1	0	0	0	0	25	1
Torpedo Kutaisi	2002–03	15	6	0	0	0	0	15	6
Torpedo Kutaisi	Total	76	15	0	0	0	0	76	15
Lokomotiv Moscow	2003	10	1	0	0	0	0	10	1
Lokomotiv Moscow	2004	19	1	1	0	2	0	22	1
Lokomotiv Moscow	2005	28	3	2	1	12	2	42	6
Lokomotiv Moscow	2006	14	0	2	0	1	0	17	0
Lokomotiv Moscow	2007	14	1	0	0	5	0	19	1
Lokomotiv Moscow	2008	4	0	1	0	0	0	5	0
Lokomotiv Moscow	2009	14	0	0	0	0	0	14	0
Lokomotiv Moscow	2010	11	0	0	0	0	0	11	0
Lokomotiv Moscow	Total	114	6	6	1	20	2	140	9
Dynamo Kyiv (loan)	2008–09	5	0	2	1	5	0	12	1
Career total		195	21	8	2	25	2	228	24

=== International ===
Appearances and goals by national team and year
National team	Year	Apps	Goals
Georgia	2001	2	0
Georgia	2003	4	1
Georgia	2004	5	2
Georgia	2005	6	1
Georgia	2006	6	0
Georgia	2007	7	0
Georgia	2008	5	0
Georgia	2010	7	0
Total		42	4

Scores and results list Georgia's goal tally first, score column indicates score after each Asatiani goal.

List of international goals scored by Malkhaz Asatiani
No.	Date	Venue	Opponent	Score	Result	Competition	Ref.
1	30 April 2003	Lokomotivi Stadium, Tbilisi, Georgia	Russia	1–0	1–0	UEFA Euro 2004 qualifying	
2	4 September 2004	Hüseyin Avni Aker Stadium, Trabzon, Turkey	Turkey	1–1	1–1	2006 FIFA World Cup qualification	
3	17 November 2004	Lokomotivi Stadium, Tbilisi, Georgia	Denmark	2–2	2–2	2006 FIFA World Cup qualification	
4	26 March 2005	Lokomotivi Stadium, Tbilisi, Georgia	Greece	1–0	1–3	2006 FIFA World Cup qualification	

== Honours ==
Torpedo Kutaisi

- Georgian League (3): 1999–2000, 2000–01, 2001–02
- Georgian Cup (1): 2000–01

Lokomotiv Moscow

- Russian League (1): 2004
- Russian Cup (1): 2006–07
- Russian Super Cup (2): 2003, 2005
- Commonwealth of Independent States Cup (1): 2005

Dynamo Kyiv

- Ukrainian League (1): 2008–09
