= Dmitri Loskov =

Russian footballer

Dmitri Vyacheslavovich Loskov
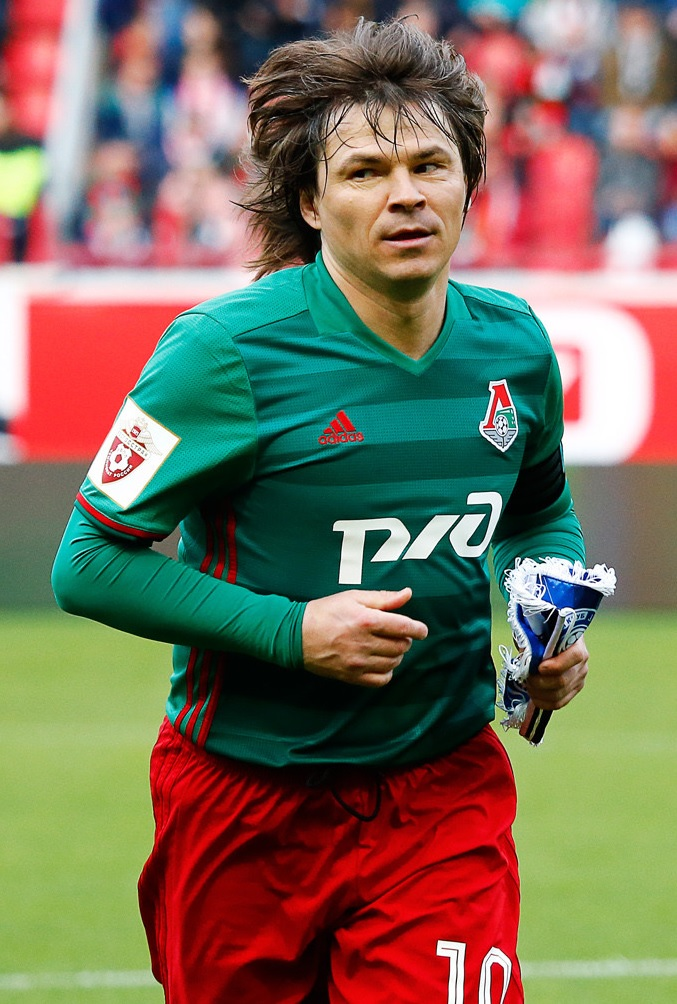
- Loskov in his 2017 farewell game with Lokomotiv

Personal information
- Full name: Dmitri Vyacheslavovich Loskov
- Date of birth: 12 February 1974 (age 52)
- Place of birth: Kurgan, Kurgan Oblast, Russian SFSR, Soviet Union
- Height: 1.78 m (5 ft 10 in)
- Position: Midfielder

Team information
- Current team: Lokomotiv Moscow (analyst)

Senior career*
Years	Team	Apps	(Gls)
1991–1996	Rostselmash	117	(25)
1997–2007	Lokomotiv Moscow	278	(95)
2007–2010	Saturn Ramenskoye	53	(7)
2010–2013	Lokomotiv Moscow	43	(4)
2017	Lokomotiv Moscow	1	(0)
Total		488	(131)

International career
2000–2007	Russia	25	(2)

Managerial career
- 2016–2022: Lokomotiv Moscow (assistant)
- 2022: Lokomotiv Moscow (caretaker)
- 2022–: Lokomotiv Moscow (analyst)
- * Club domestic league appearances and goals

Dmitri Vyacheslavovich Loskov (Russian: Дмитрий Вячеславович Лоськов; born 12 February 1974) is a Russian football coach and a former player. He works as an analyst with Lokomotiv Moscow.

A former midfielder and noteworthy playmaker in the late 1990s and early 2000s, along with Spartak Moscow's Egor Titov, partly because he is two-footed and has a wide range of passing.

Loskov is the only individual to have played in all 21 Russian seasons since the dissolution of the Soviet Union in 1991, with 20 of those seasons have been in the Russian Premier League. At one time, Loskov held the record for most appearances in Russian Premier League history (since surpassed by Sergei Semak).

== Biography ==
Dmitri Loskov was born on February 12, 1974, in Kurgan, Kurgan Oblast, Russian Soviet Federative Socialist Republic, Union of Soviet Socialist Republics. His father, Vyacheslav Arkadyevich Loskov, was the director of the gymnasium of the Kurganmashzavod.

== Club career ==
=== Rostov ===
Loskov attended Torpedo Football School in Kurgan in 1983, he moved to Rostov-on-Don football school in 1990, and signed for Rostselmash in 1991. He became a notable midfielder, and Lokomotiv Moscow have shown interest in him, signing a preliminary contract in early 1996. However, Loskov decided to spend one more year with the Rostov club.

=== Lokomotiv Moscow ===
In 1997, Loskov transferred to Lokomotiv Moscow. He achieved significant success with the club, winning two Russian Cups, two Russian championships, and becoming the league top goalscorer twice. He played over 200 league matches for Lokomotiv, scoring 100 goals in the Russian Premier League and is the captain of the club since 2006. His high standard of performances has always attracted interest from leading European clubs like Monaco and Tottenham Hotspur. In Europe, Lokomotiv reached the Cup Winner's Cup semi-finals twice (1997–98 and 1998–99) and the Champions League second round (2003–04). Despite being one of the Russian Premier League's most consistent players, he has never showed his best for Russia only managing 25 appearances and 2 goals.

=== Saturn Ramenskoye ===
In 2007, Loskov left Lokomotiv for Saturn Ramenskoye, because of a conflict with manager Anatoly Byshovets.

=== Back to Lokomotiv ===
In July 2010, Lokomotiv once again managed by Yuri Syomin, signed Loskov on a half-season contract, with the option of extension. Before the season's end in November 2010, Loskov made 13 appearances and scored one goal. Despite the club finishing fifth in the league and Syomin's dismissal, Loskov extended his contract, which kept him at the club for two more seasons. In July 2013, following expiration of his contract, Loskov became a free agent and soon retired from playing at the age of 39.

=== Second return to Lokomotiv ===
On 24 February 2017, he signed with Lokomotiv as a player once again until the end of the 2016–17 Russian Premier League season. He started his farewell match as a captain on 13 May 2017 in a game against FC Orenburg before being ceremoniously substituted after 13 minutes of play.

== Coaching career ==
On 5 October 2021, he was appointed caretaker manager of Lokomotiv, following the resignation of Marko Nikolić.

Loskov served as caretaker manager for 0–4 Russian Cup loss to FC Yenisey Krasnoyarsk on 3 March 2022. For the next league game, he was replaced by Oleg Pashinin in the position. For the game against PFC CSKA Moscow on 12 March 2022, Loskov again served as caretaker. He returned to the assistant position after the appointment of Zaur Khapov as a new manager on 4 April 2022. On 5 April 2022, Lokomotiv announced that Loskov left the coaching staff and will continue to work at the club in different position.

== Career statistics ==
=== Club ===
Appearances and goals by club, season and competition
Club	Season	League		Cup		Europe		Other (Note: Includes Russian Super Cup)		Total	
Club	Season	Apps	Goals	Apps	Goals	Apps	Goals	Apps	Goals	Apps	Goals
Rostselmash Rostov-on-Don	1991	2	0	0	0	–		–		2	0
Rostselmash Rostov-on-Don	1992	6	0	1	0	–		–		7	0
Rostselmash Rostov-on-Don	1993	18	1	2	0	–		–		20	1
Rostselmash Rostov-on-Don	1994	37	11	3	1	–		–		40	12
Rostselmash Rostov-on-Don	1995	27	5	1	0	–		–		28	5
Rostselmash Rostov-on-Don	1996	27	8	1	0	–		–		28	8
Rostselmash Rostov-on-Don	Total	117	25	8	1	0	0	0	0	125	26
Lokomotiv Moscow	1997	23	6	0	0	4	2	–		27	8
Lokomotiv Moscow	1998	18	4	3	0	6	0	–		27	4
Lokomotiv Moscow	1999	28	14	2	0	10	3	–		40	18
Lokomotiv Moscow	2000	26	15	4	4	3	1	–		33	20
Lokomotiv Moscow	2001	29	12	4	1	10	0	–		43	13
Lokomotiv Moscow	2002	30	7	0	0	9	3	–		39	10
Lokomotiv Moscow	2003	30	14	2	2	11	2	1	0	44	18
Lokomotiv Moscow	2004	30	4	6	1	2	0	–		38	5
Lokomotiv Moscow	2005	22	6	0	0	3	5	1	1	26	12
Lokomotiv Moscow	2006	29	13	3	3	4	1	–		36	17
Lokomotiv Moscow	2007	13	0	4	0	0	0	–		17	2
Lokomotiv Moscow	Total	278	95	28	11	62	17	2	1	370	124
Saturn Moscow Oblast	2007	15	1	1	0	–		–		17	1
Saturn Moscow Oblast	2008	15	1	2	0	1	0	–		18	1
Saturn Moscow Oblast	2009	17	5	0	0	–		–		17	5
Saturn Moscow Oblast	2010	6	0	0	0	–		–		6	0
Saturn Moscow Oblast	Total	57	7	3	0	1	0	0	0	57	7
Lokomotiv Moscow	2010	13	1	0	0	2	0	–		15	2
Lokomotiv Moscow	2011–12	30	3	2	0	3	0	–		35	6
Lokomotiv Moscow	2012–13	0	0	1	0	–		–		1	0
Lokomotiv Moscow	Total	43	4	3	0	5	0	0	0	51	4
Lokomotiv Moscow	2016–17	1	0	0	0	–		–		1	0
Career total		492	131	42	12	68	17	2	1	604	161

=== International ===
Appearances and goals by national team and year
National team	Year	Apps	Goals
Russia	2000	3	0
Russia	2001	0	0
Russia	2002	3	0
Russia	2003	5	0
Russia	2004	4	1
Russia	2005	7	1
Russia	2006	3	0
Total		25	2

Scores and results list Russia's goal tally first, score column indicates score after each Loskov goal.

List of international goals scored by Dmitri Loskov
No.	Date	Venue	Opponent	Score	Result	Competition
1	17 November 2004	Kuban Stadium, Krasnodar, Russia	Estonia	4–0	4–0	2006 FIFA World Cup qualification
2	4 June 2005	Petrovsky Stadium, Saint Petersburg, Russia	Latvia	2–0	2–0	2006 FIFA World Cup qualification

== Honours ==
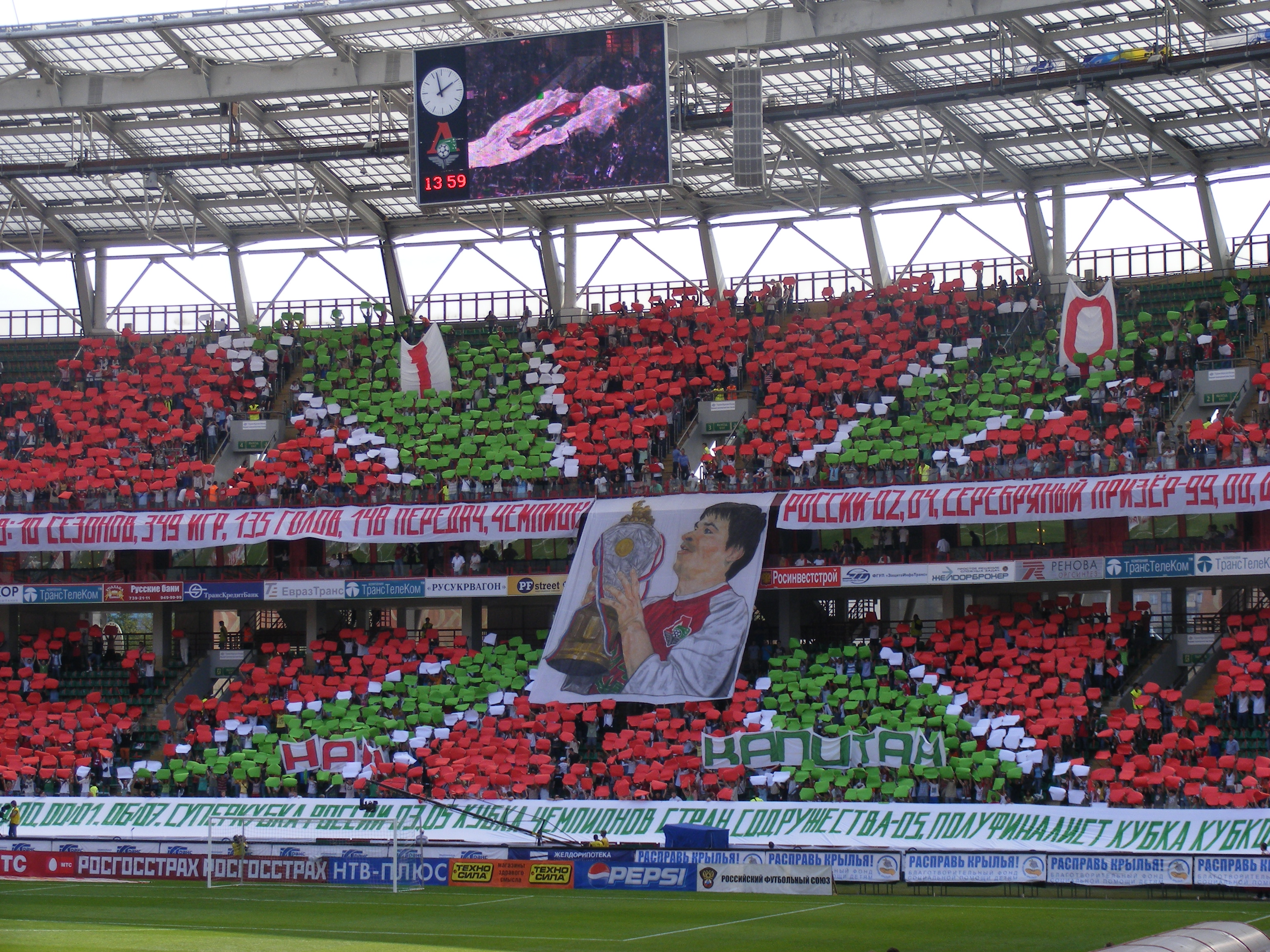
Fans of Lokomotiv greet Saturn's Dmitri Loskov before the first game of the former captain against his old club

Lokomotiv Moscow

- Russian Premier League: 2002, 2004
- Russian Cup: 1999–2000, 2000–01, 2006–07
- Russian Super Cup: 2003, 2005

Individual

- Futbol's Footballer of the Year: 2002, 2003
- Sport-Express's Russian Premier League Best Player: 2002
- Russian Premier League top scorer: 2000, 2003
- Sport-Express's Russian Premier League Best Central Midfielder: 2000, 2005
- Sport-Express's Russian Premier League Best Attacking Midfielder: 1999, 2002, 2003, 2004
