= Sergey Kiselyov =

Sergey Kiselyov may refer to:

- Sergey Kiselyov (footballer) (born 1976), Russian footballer
- Sergei Kiselyov (swimmer) (born 1961), Russian swimmer
