= Stogov =

Stogov (Russian: Стогов, from "стог" meaning "haystack") is a Russian masculine surname, its feminine counterpart is Stogova. It may refer to

- Oleg Stogov (born 1965), Russian football coach and former player
- Vladimir Stogov (1930–2005), Russian weightlifter
- Nikolai Stogov (1873–1959), Russian general
