= Dmitri Sennikov =

Russian association football player

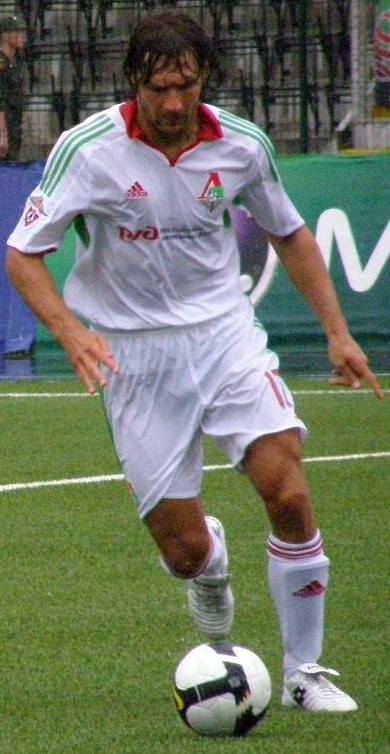

Personal information
- Full name: Dmitri Aleksandrovich Sennikov
- Date of birth: 24 June 1976 (age 50)
- Place of birth: Leningrad, Soviet Union
- Height: 1.83 m (6 ft 0 in)
- Position: Defender

Senior career*
Years	Team	Apps	(Gls)
1996–1997	Lokomotiv St Petersburg	76	(9)
1998	CSKA Moscow	7	(0)
1998	Shinnik Yaroslavl	9	(0)
1999	Rubin Kazan	41	(6)
2000–2010	Lokomotiv Moscow	191	(5)
Total		324	(20)

International career
2002–2005	Russia	26	(0)
- * Club domestic league appearances and goals as of 19:36, 15 March 2010 (UTC)

Dmitri Aleksandrovich Sennikov (Russian: Дмитрий Александрович Сенников; born 24 June 1976) is a Russian former defender best known for his performances for Lokomotiv Moscow, where he spent a total of 11 seasons.

== Club career ==
Dmitri Sennikov was born in Leningrad (now Saint Petersburg) and graduated from Zenit football school. He was not signed by any professional club and continued playing football as a hobby. In 1996, he was invited to Lokomotiv Saint Petersburg, a First Division team. After two years at the club, he accepted the offer of CSKA Moscow. However, Sennikov failed to become a first-team regular and was loaned to Shinnik Yaroslavl after half a season. In 1999, he transferred to another First Division club, Rubin Kazan.

In 2000, Sennikov returned to Moscow, having accepted an offer from Lokomotiv, a team for which he went on to make more than 200 appearances in all competitions. On 21 December 2010, following the expiration of his last contract with the club, he announced his retirement as a player.

== International career ==
Sennikov's first game for the national team was on 27 March 2002, an away friendly against Estonia. He has played for Russia at the 2002 FIFA World Cup and Euro 2004. He made his final appearance for the team on 12 October 2005, in a decisive 2006 FIFA World Cup qualification away match against Slovakia, which resulted in a goalless draw and subsequent elimination of Russia from the competition.

== Style of play ==
Sennikov could play any defensive position in any formation; a center-back or a full-back on either flank. In his early days as a professional, he also played in midfield as either a defensive midfielder or a box-to-box.

At Lokomotiv Moscow, under long-term manager Yuri Syomin, Sennikov usually played on the left of a back-three, despite being right-footed. He could also play on the right, depending on whom he was chosen to partner in defense for a particular game. Although not his primary position, he sometimes played as a full-back, both for the club and the national team.

In 2025, while commenting on winning the Russian Premier League in 2004, Sennikov gave credit to Malkhaz Asatiani as his best central defense partnership.

== Personal life ==
Sennikov has named the Premier League his favorite footballing competition and Liverpool his favorite team, which he supports since the 1990s.

== Honours ==
Lokomotiv Moscow

- Russian Premier League: 2002, 2004
- Russian Cup: 1999–2000, 2000–01, 2006–07
- Russian Super Cup: 2003, 2005
- CIS Cup: 2005

== Career statistics ==
Club	Season	Div	League		Cup		Europe		Total	
Club	Season	Div	Apps	Goals	Apps	Goals	Apps	Goals	Apps	Goals!
Lokomotiv SPb	1996	2nd	36	2	4	0	0	0	40	2
Lokomotiv SPb	1997	2nd	40	7	2	0	0	0	42	7
CSKA-2	1998	3rd	12	1	0	0	0	0	12	1
CSKA	1998	1st	7	0	0	0	0	0	7	0
Shinnik	1998	1st	9	2	2	0	0	0	11	2
Rubin	1999	2nd	41	6	1	0	0	0	42	6
Lokomotiv-2 M	2000	3rd	7	0	0	0	0	0	7	0
Lokomotiv M	2000	1st	13	2	3	0	6	0	22	2
Lokomotiv M	2001	1st	18	0	1	0	6	1	25	1
Lokomotiv M	2002	1st	24	1	2	0	8	0	34	1
Lokomotiv M	2003	1st	25	0	6	0	12	0	43	0
Lokomotiv M	2004	1st	26	0	1	0	4	0	31	0
Lokomotiv M	2005	1st	29	1	1	0	10	0	40	1
Lokomotiv M	2006	1st	14	0	4	0	1	0	19	0
Lokomotiv M	2007	1st	10	0	0	0	5	0	15	0
Lokomotiv M	2008	1st	22	1	3	0	0	0	25	1
Lokomotiv M	2009	1st	9	0	0	0	0	0	9	0
Lokomotiv M	2010	1st	1	0	0	0	0	0	1	0
