= 2003 Russian Super Cup =

Football match

The 2003 Russian Super Cup was the 1st Russian Super Cup match, a football match which was contested between the 2002 Russian Premier League champion, Lokomotiv Moscow, and the winner of 2001–02 Russian Cup, CSKA Moscow. The match was held on 8 March 2003 at the Lokomotiv Stadium in Moscow, Russia. Lokomotiv Moscow beat CSKA Moscow 4–3 on penalties, after the extra time had finished in a 1–1 draw, to win the first Russian Super Cup.

== Match details ==
8 March 2003
15:00 MSK

Lokomotiv Moscow	1–1 (a.e.t.)	CSKA Moscow
Pimenov 83'	Report	Jarošík 20'
Penalties
Loskov (penalty missed); Lekgetho (penalty missed); Izmailov (penalty missed); Maminov (penalty scored); Pimenov (penalty scored); Ignashevich (penalty scored); Pashinin (penalty scored)	4–3	(penalty missed) Kirichenko; (penalty scored) Samodin; (penalty missed) Yevsikov; (penalty scored) Solomatin; (penalty missed) Gusev; (penalty scored) Rahimić; (penalty missed) Šemberas

Lokomotiv, Moscow
Attendance: 15,000
Referee: Valentin Ivanov (Moscow)

Lokomotiv Moscow:
GK	1	(Russia) Sergei Ovchinnikov	(yellow card) 42'
DF	2	(Russia) Gennadiy Nizhegorodov
DF	5	(Russia) Sergei Ignashevich	(yellow card) 50'
DF	14	(Uzbekistan) Oleg Pashinin	(yellow card) 58'
DF	16	(Russia) Vadim Evseev
DF	17	(Russia) Dmitri Sennikov		(substituted off) 56'
MF	4	(South Africa) Jacob Lekgetho
MF	8	(Uzbekistan) Vladimir Maminov	(yellow card) 24'
MF	10	(Russia) Dmitri Loskov (c)
FW	11	(Brazil) Júlio César		(substituted off) 46'
FW	15	(Russia) Maksim Buznikin		(substituted off) 46'
Substitutes:
GK	50	(Russia) Platon Zakharchuk
DF	18	(Serbia and Montenegro) Milan Obradović
MF	3	(Russia) Yury Drozdov
MF	6	(Azerbaijan) Narvik Sirkhayev		(substituted on) 56'
MF	7	(Russia) Marat Izmailov		(substituted on) 46'
MF	30	(Georgia (country)) Malkhaz Asatiani
FW	25	(Russia) Ruslan Pimenov		(substituted on) 46'
Manager:
(Russia) Yuri Semin Assistant referees: (Russia) Andrei Lukashin (Russia) Tikhon Kalugin; Fourth official: (Russia) Mikhail Veselovskiy

CSKA Moscow:
GK	1	(Russia) Veniamin Mandrykin
DF	6	(Russia) Aleksei Berezutski
DF	23	(Russia) Denis Yevsikov		(substituted off) 60'
DF	24	(Russia) Vasili Berezutski	(yellow card) 61'
MF	7	(Russia) Igor Yanovskiy	(yellow card) 49'	(substituted off) 79'
MF	8	(Russia) Rolan Gusev (c)
MF	19	(Latvia) Juris Laizāns		(substituted off) 79'
MF	20	(Czech Republic) Jiří Jarošík
MF	25	(Bosnia and Herzegovina) Elvir Rahimić	(yellow card) 63'
MF	27	(Russia) Alan Kusov	(yellow card) 48'	(substituted off) 80'
FW	21	(Russia) Denis Popov		(substituted off) 58'
Substitutes:
GK	35	(Russia) Igor Akinfeev
DF	2	(Lithuania) Deividas Šemberas		(substituted on) 79'
DF	3	(Russia) Andrei Solomatin	(yellow card) 98'	(substituted on) 79'
DF	28	(Ukraine) Bohdan Shershun
FW	14	(Russia) Dmitri Kirichenko		(substituted on) 58'
FW	22	(Russia) Sergey Samodin		(substituted on) 80'
FW	26	(Uzbekistan) Alexander Geynrikh	(yellow card) 78'	(substituted on) 60'
Manager:
(Russia) Valery Gazzaev

== See also ==
- 2003 in Russian football
- 2002 Russian Premier League
- 2001–02 Russian Cup
