= Sergey Samodin =

Russian footballer

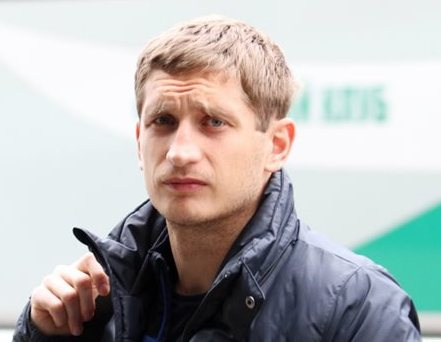
- Sergey Samodin (2013)

Personal information
- Full name: Sergey Aleksandrovich Samodin
- Date of birth: February 14, 1985 (age 41)
- Place of birth: Stavropol, Russian SFSR, Soviet Union
- Height: 1.85 m (6 ft 1 in)
- Position: Striker

Senior career*
Years	Team	Apps	(Gls)
2001	FC Krasnodar-2000	13	(4)
2002–2006	PFC CSKA Moscow	14	(0)
2006	→ FC Spartak Nizhny Novgorod (loan)	40	(20)
2006–2011	FC Dnipro Dnipropetrovsk	58	(13)
2010–2011	→ FC Arsenal Kyiv (loan)	20	(2)
2011	→ FC Kryvbas Kryvyi Rih (loan)	14	(6)
2011–2013	FC Kryvbas Kryvyi Rih	34	(11)
2013	FC Chornomorets Odesa	13	(2)
2014–2016	FC Mordovia Saransk	34	(5)
2014	→ FC Shinnik Yaroslavl (loan)	17	(11)
2016	FC Tom Tomsk	12	(1)
2017	FC Yenisey Krasnoyarsk	12	(10)
2017–2018	FC Krylia Sovetov Samara	31	(9)
2018–2021	FC Shinnik Yaroslavl	85	(21)

International career
2005–2007	Russia U-21	4	(1)
- * Club domestic league appearances and goals

Sergey Aleksandrovich Samodin (Russian: Сергей Александрович Самодин; born 14 February 1985) is a Russian former footballer who played as a striker.

== Club career ==
He made his debut for PFC CSKA Moscow on 8 March 2003 in a 2003 Russian Super Cup game against FC Lokomotiv Moscow and scored his shot in the penalty shoot-out as CSKA lost. He made his Russian Premier League debut for CSKA on 19 April 2003 against FC Rostov.

Samodin played for CSKA Moscow until 2005, and then FC Spartak Nizhny Novgorod in 2006 scoring 20 goals in 40 games, before moving to Dnipro. He made his debut for Dnipro on 3 March 2007 in a 1–1 draw with FC Illychivets Mariupol.

In January 2014, Samodin signed a 2.5-year contract with Mordovia Saransk.

== International career ==
Samodin played for the Russian Under 21 team.

== Career statistics ==
As of 10 March 2018

Club	Season	League			Cup		Continental		Other		Total	
Club	Season	Division	Apps	Goals	Apps	Goals	Apps	Goals	Apps	Goals	Apps	Goals
Krasnodar-2000	2001	PFL	13	5	1	0	–		–		14	5
CSKA Moscow	2002	Russian Premier League	0	0	0	0	0	0	–		0	0
CSKA Moscow	2003	Russian Premier League	2	0	1	0	2	0	1 (Note: One appearance in the Russian Super Cup)	0	6	0
CSKA Moscow	2004	Russian Premier League	0	0	1	0	0	0	–		1	0
CSKA Moscow	2005	Russian Premier League	12	0	3	2	5	1	–		20	3
CSKA Moscow	Total		14	0	5	2	7	1	1	0	27	3
Spartak Nizhny Novgorod	2006	FNL	40	20	2	1	–		–		42	21
Dnipro Dnipropetrovsk	2006–07	Ukrainian Premier League	13	3	–		–		–		13	3
Dnipro Dnipropetrovsk	2007–08	Ukrainian Premier League	27	8	1	0	4	1	–		32	9
Dnipro Dnipropetrovsk	2008–09	Ukrainian Premier League	8	0	1	0	1	1	–		10	1
Dnipro Dnipropetrovsk	2009–10	Ukrainian Premier League	10	2	2	0	–		–		12	2
Dnipro Dnipropetrovsk	Total		58	13	4	0	5	2	0	0	67	15
Arsenal Kyiv	2010–11	Ukrainian Premier League	19	2	3	3	–		–		22	5
Arsenal Kyiv	2011–12	Ukrainian Premier League	1	0	–		–		–		1	0
Arsenal Kyiv	Total		20	2	3	3	0	0	0	0	23	5
Kryvbas Kryvyi Rih	2011–12	Ukrainian Premier League	22	7	1	0	–		–		23	7
Kryvbas Kryvyi Rih	2012–13	Ukrainian Premier League	26	10	1	1	–		–		27	11
Kryvbas Kryvyi Rih	Total		48	17	2	1	0	0	0	0	50	18
Chornomorets Odesa	2013–14	Ukrainian Premier League	13	2	1	0	8	1	–		22	3
Mordovia Saransk	2013–14	FNL	10	2	1	1	–		–		11	3
Shinnik Yaroslavl	2014–15	FNL	17	11	3	2	–		–		20	13
Mordovia Saransk	2014–15	Russian Premier League	7	0	1	0	–		–		8	0
Mordovia Saransk	2015–16	Russian Premier League	17	3	1	0	–		–		18	3
Mordovia Saransk	Total (2 spells)		34	5	3	1	0	0	0	0	37	6
Tom Tomsk	2016–17	Russian Premier League	12	1	0	0	–		–		12	1
Yenisey Krasnoyarsk	2016–17	FNL	12	10	–		–		2 (Note: Two appearances in promotion play-offs)	0	14	10
Krylia Sovetov Samara	2017–18	FNL	25	8	2	0	–		–		27	8
Career total			306	94	26	10	20	4	3	0	355	108
