= Vladimir Maminov =

Russian footballer

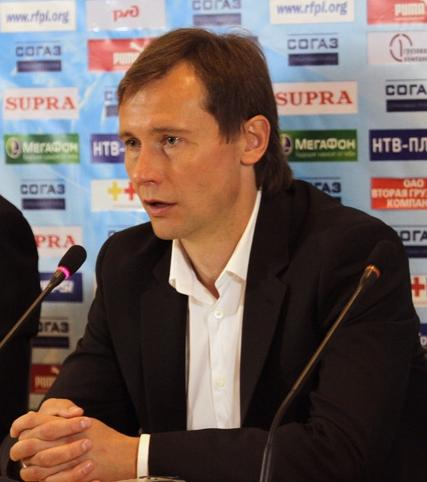

Personal information
- Date of birth: 4 September 1974 (age 52)
- Place of birth: Moscow, Soviet Union
- Height: 1.78 m (5 ft 10 in)
- Position: Midfielder

Senior career*
Years	Team	Apps	(Gls)
1992–2008	FC Lokomotiv Moscow	400	(31)

International career
2001–2005	Uzbekistan	12	(3)

Managerial career
- 2009: FC Lokomotiv Moscow (caretaker)
- 2009–2011: FC Lokomotiv Moscow (assistant)
- 2011: FC Lokomotiv Moscow (caretaker)
- 2014: FC Rubin Kazan (coach)
- 2014–2015: FC Khimki
- 2016–2017: FC Solyaris Moscow
- 2017–2018: FC Tyumen
- 2020: FC Aktobe
- 2021: FC Olimp-Dolgoprudny (assistant)
- 2021: FC Kuban Krasnodar (assistant)
- 2021: FC Kuban Krasnodar (caretaker)
- 2022: FC Spartak Kostroma
- * Club domestic league appearances and goals

Vladimir Aleksandrovich Maminov (Russian: Владимир Александрович Маминов; born 4 September 1974) is a Russian-born football manager and a former player who represented Uzbekistan internationally.

== Career ==
He played all his career for Russian Premier League club FC Lokomotiv Moscow as a central midfielder.

== International ==
Born in Moscow, Maminov was one of several foreign-born players to represent the Uzbekistan national football team in 2002 FIFA World Cup qualifying. He scored on his debut, a 7–0 victory against Taiwan on 23 April 2001.

Maminov received 12 caps and scored three goals for the national team between 2001 and 2005.

== Club career stats ==
Last update: 29 November 2008

Season	Team	Country	Division	Apps	Goals
1992	FC Lokomotiv Moscow	Russia	1	0	0
1993	FC Lokomotiv Moscow	Russia	1	2	0
1994	FC Lokomotiv Moscow	Russia	1	11	1
1995	FC Lokomotiv Moscow	Russia	1	11	1
1996	FC Lokomotiv Moscow	Russia	1	31	3
1997	FC Lokomotiv Moscow	Russia	1	31	6
1998	FC Lokomotiv Moscow	Russia	1	19	3
1999	FC Lokomotiv Moscow	Russia	1	21	3
2000	FC Lokomotiv Moscow	Russia	1	17	2
2001	FC Lokomotiv Moscow	Russia	1	25	5
2002	FC Lokomotiv Moscow	Russia	1	28	4
2003	FC Lokomotiv Moscow	Russia	1	23	2
2004	FC Lokomotiv Moscow	Russia	1	18	1
2005	FC Lokomotiv Moscow	Russia	1	20	0
2006	FC Lokomotiv Moscow	Russia	1	5	0
2007	FC Lokomotiv Moscow	Russia	1	9	0
2008	FC Lokomotiv Moscow	Russia	1	17	0

== Honours ==
Team

- Russian Premier League :
  - Winner: 2 (2002, 2004)
  - Runner-up: 4 (1995, 1999, 2000, 2001)
  - 3rd position: 4 (1994, 1998, 2005, 2006)
- Russian Cup
  - Winner: 5 (1995/96, 1996/97, 1999/00, 2000/01, 2006/07)
  - Runner-up: 1 (1997/98)
- Russian Super Cup
  - Winner: 2 (2003, 2005)
  - Runner-up: 1 (2008)
- CIS Cup :
  - Winner: 1 (2005)

Individual

- 33 Best Russian Player :
  - 1st: 2004
  - 2nd: 2002, 2003

== Coaching career ==
=== Lokomotiv ===
Maminov was named as caretaker head coach for FC Lokomotiv Moscow on 28 April 2009, he replaced Rashid Rakhimov. Maminov started his coaching career with a victory over Spartak Nalchik. He became assistant to Yuri Semin when Semin was appointed the new manager. After Yuri Krasnozhan was fired from manager position in June 2011, Maminov was appointed the caretaker once more. This time he managed the team for about 3 weeks before being replaced by José Couceiro.

=== Rubin ===
On 10 January 2014, Maminov was appointed assistant manager of FC Rubin Kazan.

=== Khimki ===
On 19 June 2014, Maminov was appointed head coach of FC Khimki.

== See also ==
- One-club man
