= Roman Babichev =

Russian footballer

Personal information
- Full name: Roman Viktorovich Babichev
- Date of birth: 18 August 1975 (age 51)
- Place of birth: Volgograd, Russian SFSR
- Height: 1.83 m (6 ft 0 in)
- Position: Midfielder

Senior career*
Years	Team	Apps	(Gls)
1992	FC Tekstilshchik-d Kamyshin	30	(0)
1993	FC Zvezda-Rus Gorodishche	13	(0)
1995	FC Zvezda Gorodishche	25	(2)
1996	FC Torpedo Volzhsky	23	(2)
1997–2002	FC Energetik Uren	159	(41)
2003–2004	FC Okzhetpes	51	(2)
2005	FC Olimpia Volgograd	23	(7)
2006	FC Vostok	21	(0)
2008	FC Smena Komsomolsk-na-Amure	24	(2)
2009–2010	FC Energiya Volzhsky	46	(3)
- * Club domestic league appearances and goals

Roman Viktorovich Babichev (Russian: Роман Викторович Бабичев; born 18 August 1975) is a former Russian professional footballer.
