= Vadim Garin =

Russian footballer

Personal information
- Full name: Vadim Sergeyevich Garin
- Date of birth: 14 December 1979 (age 46)
- Place of birth: Saratov, Russian SFSR
- Height: 1.91 m (6 ft 3 in)
- Positions: Defender; midfielder

Senior career*
Years	Team	Apps	(Gls)
1996–1997	FC Sokol-PZhD Saratov	0	(0)
1999	FC Iskra Engels	17	(0)
1999	FC Balakovo	16	(0)
2000–2002	FC Sokol Saratov	44	(1)
2003	FC Chernomorets Novorossiysk	0	(0)
2003	FC Sokol Saratov	19	(0)
2003	FC Iskra Engels	12	(0)
2004	FC Lada Togliatti	24	(0)
2005–2009	FC Sokol Saratov	96	(3)
2010	FC Mostovik-Primorye Ussuriysk	5	(0)
- * Club domestic league appearances and goals

Vadim Sergeyevich Garin (Russian: Вадим Серге́евич Гарин; born 14 December 1979) is a former Russian professional football player.

== Club career ==
He made his debut in the Russian Premier League in 2001 for FC Sokol Saratov.
