= Vadim Klass =

Russian footballer

Personal information
- Full name: Vadim Vladimirovich Klass
- Date of birth: 4 July 1979 (age 47)
- Height: 1.78 m (5 ft 10 in)
- Position: Forward

Senior career*
Years	Team	Apps	(Gls)
1996–1997	FC Lokomotiv-d St. Petersburg	50	(6)
1998–2000	FC Lokomotiv St. Petersburg	47	(1)
2001–2002	FC Zenit-2 St. Petersburg	35	(2)
2003	FC Torpedo-Piter St. Petersburg		
2004	AC Oulu	3	(0)
2004–2005	SDYuShOR Zenit St. Petersburg		
2005	FC Lokomotiv-NN Nizhny Novgorod	14	(4)
2006–2007	FC Zenit-2 St. Petersburg	23	(2)
2008–2011	FC Sever Murmansk	108	(38)
2012–2016	FC Favorit Vyborg		
2017–2018	FC LAZ Luga		
- * Club domestic league appearances and goals

Vadim Vladimirovich Klass (Russian: Вадим Владимирович Класс; born 4 July 1979) is a former Russian professional footballer.

== Club career ==
He played 3 seasons in the Russian Football National League for FC Lokomotiv St. Petersburg.
