= Sergei Kushov =

Russian footballer

Personal information
- Full name: Sergei Leonidovich Kushov
- Date of birth: 18 August 1977 (age 49)
- Place of birth: Leningrad, Russian SFSR
- Height: 1.76 m (5 ft 9 1/2 in)
- Position: Midfielder

Senior career*
| Years | Team | Apps | (Gls) |
| 1995 | SKA Turbostroitel St. Petersburg | | |
| 1996–1997 | FC Lokomotiv-d St. Petersburg | 59 | (4) |
| 1998–2000 | FC Lokomotiv St. Petersburg | 41 | (4) |
| 2001–2002 | FC Baltika Kaliningrad | 33 | (1) |
| 2003–2005 | FC Oryol | 111 | (8) |
| 2006 | FK Atlantas | 6 | (0) |
| 2007–2010 | FC Salyut Belgorod | 135 | (16) |
| 2011 | FC Shinnik Yaroslavl | 11 | (0) |
| 2012–2013 | FC Salyut Belgorod | 22 | (1) |
- * Club domestic league appearances and goals

Sergei Leonidovich Kushov (Russian: Серге́й Леонидович Кушов; born 18 August 1977) is a former Russian professional football player.

== Club career ==
He played 12 seasons in the Russian Football National League for 5 different teams.
