= Sergei Zozulya =

Russian footballer

Personal information
- Full name: Sergei Nikolayevich Zozulya
- Date of birth: 7 February 1977 (age 49)
- Height: 1.65 m (5 ft 5 in)
- Position: Forward

Senior career*
Years	Team	Apps	(Gls)
1995	FC Niva Slavyansk-na-Kubani	22	(0)
1996	FC Chernomorets Novorossiysk	0	(0)
1996	→ FC Chernomorets-d Novorossiysk	8	(1)
1996–1997	FC Niva Slavyansk-na-Kubani	45	(17)
1998–1999	FC Balakovo	62	(16)
2000–2001	FC Sokol Saratov	15	(0)
2001	FC Sodovik Sterlitamak	20	(9)
2003	FC Biokhimik-Mordovia Saransk	15	(1)
2004	FC Spartak-UGP Anapa (amateur)		
- * Club domestic league appearances and goals

Sergei Nikolayevich Zozulya (Russian: Сергей Николаевич Зозуля; born 7 February 1977) is a former Russian football player.
