= 2005 Russian Super Cup =

Football match

The 2005 Russian Super Cup was the 3rd Russian Super Cup match, a football match which was contested between the 2004 Russian Premier League champion, Lokomotiv Moscow and the winner of 2003–04 Russian Cup, Terek Grozny. The match was held on 6 March 2005 at the Lokomotiv Stadium in Moscow, Russia. Lokomotiv Moscow beat Terek Grozny 1–0 to win their second Russian Super Cup.

== Match details ==
6 March 2005
16:00 MSK

Lokomotiv Moscow	1–0	Terek Grozny
Loskov 74' (pen.)	Report

Lokomotiv, Moscow
Attendance: 9,000
Referee: Vladimir Pettay (Petrozavodsk)

CSKA Moscow:
GK	1	(Russia) Sergei Ovchinnikov
DF	4	(Belarus) Sergei Omelyanchuk
DF	17	(Russia) Dmitri Sennikov
DF	30	(Georgia (country)) Malkhaz Asatiani	(yellow card) 53'
DF	41	(Belarus) Sergei Gurenko		(substituted off) 20'
MF	5	(Brazil) Francisco Lima
MF	7	(Russia) Marat Izmailov
MF	8	(Russia) Vladimir Maminov
MF	10	(Russia) Dmitri Loskov (c)
MF	28	(Russia) Dmitri Khokhlov		(substituted off) 46'
FW	11	(Russia) Dmitri Sychev
Substitutes:
GK	21	(Uzbekistan) Aleksei Poliakov
DF	9	(Russia) Aleksei Bugayev		(substituted in) 20'
DF	14	(Uzbekistan) Oleg Pashinin
MF	20	(Russia) Yevgeni Zinovyev
MF	63	(Russia) Diniyar Bilyaletdinov		(substituted in) 46'
FW	32	(Georgia (country)) Mikheil Ashvetia
FW	5	(Russia) Igor Lebedenko
Manager:
(Russia) Yuri Semin Assistant referees: (Russia) Vladislav Khodeyev (Russia) Yevgeni Volnin; Fourth official: (Russia) Stanislav Sukhina

Terek Grozny:
GK	27	(Russia) Ruslan Nigmatullin
DF	3	(Russia) Deni Gaisumov (c)
DF	5	(Russia) Maksim Bokov
DF	6	(Russia) Gennadiy Nizhegorodov
DF	22	(Russia) Aleksandr Lipko
DF	28	(Russia) Roman Sharonov
MF	7	(Turkmenistan) Dmitri Khomukha	(substituted off) 79'
MF	8	(Azerbaijan) Narvik Sirkhayev	(substituted off) 79'
MF	17	(Russia) Denis Klyuyev
MF	21	(Russia) Ruslan Adzhindzhal
FW	9	(Russia) Andrei Fedkov
Substitutes:
GK	1	(Ukraine) Volodymyr Savchenko
DF	2	(Russia) Aleksandr Shmarko
DF	18	(Russia) Timur Dzhabrailov
MF	15	(Russia) Viktor Bulatov
FW	10	(Russia) Musa Mazayev	(substituted in) 79'
FW	11	(Russia) Oleg Teryokhin
FW	20	(Russia) Roman Adamov	(substituted in) 79'
Manager:
(Russia) Voit Talgaev

== See also ==
- 2005 in Russian football
- 2004 Russian Premier League
- 2003–04 Russian Cup
