= Draško Milekić =

Serbian footballer

Personal information
- Date of birth: 15 October 1969 (age 57)
- Height: 1.75 m (5 ft 9 in)
- Position: Defender

Senior career*
Years	Team	Apps	(Gls)
1998–2000	Borac Čačak		
2000	Uralan Elista	14	(3)
2002-2004	Radnički Kragujevac		
2005	Hajduk Beograd	6	(0)
- * Club domestic league appearances and goals

Draško Milekić (Serbian Cyrillic: Драшко Милекић; born 15 October 1969) is a Serbian retired football player.
