= Paata Berishvili =

Russian footballer

Personal information
- Full name: Paata Iradionovich Berishvili
- Date of birth: 30 September 1973 (age 53)
- Place of birth: Nakieti, Georgian SSR
- Height: 1.81 m (5 ft 11 1/2 in)
- Position: Midfielder

Senior career*
Years	Team	Apps	(Gls)
1990–1992	FC Signal Izobilny	56	(0)
1992	FC Dynamo Stavropol	6	(0)
1993–1994	FC Viktor Zaporizhzhia	29	(2)
1994–1996	FC Olimp Kislovodsk	47	(5)
1996	FC Sokol-PZhD Saratov	16	(0)
1997	FC Dynamo Stavropol	25	(3)
1998–1999	FC Anzhi Makhachkala	23	(0)
2000	FC Kuban Krasnodar	16	(0)
2001	FC Dynamo Stavropol	12	(3)
2002	FC Fakel-Voronezh Voronezh	4	(0)
2002	FC Lukoil Chelyabinsk	10	(1)
2004	FC Volga Tver	11	(3)
2004	FC Uralan Elista	15	(2)
2005	FC Taraz	4	(0)
2006	FC Mashuk-KMV Pyatigorsk	27	(0)
2008	FC Dynamo Stavropol	4	(0)
2009	FC Stavropol	22	(0)

Managerial career
- 2013–2015: FC Dynamo GTS Stavropol (assistant)
- 2015–2016: FC Dynamo Stavropol (assistant)
- 2017–2018: FC Mashuk-KMV Pyatigorsk (assistant)
- 2020–2021: PFC Dynamo Stavropol
- * Club domestic league appearances and goals

Paata Iradionovich Berishvili (Russian: Паата Ирадионович Беришвили; born 30 September 1973) is a Russian professional football coach and a former player. He also holds Georgian citizenship.

== Playing career ==
He made his debut in the Russian Premier League in 1992 for FC Dynamo Stavropol.
