= Sergei Lebedkov =

Russian footballer

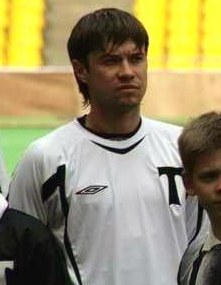
- Lebedkov for FC Torpedo in 2008

Personal information
- Full name: Sergei Aleksandrovich Lebedkov
- Date of birth: 26 March 1981 (age 45)
- Place of birth: Tambov, Russian SFSR
- Height: 1.76 m (5 ft 9 1/2 in)
- Position: Midfielder

Senior career*
Years	Team	Apps	(Gls)
1998–1999	FC Spartak Tambov	38	(2)
1999–2000	FC Spartak-2 Moscow	39	(1)
2000	FC Spartak Moscow	1	(0)
2001	FC Uralan Elista	1	(0)
2002–2004	FC Neftekhimik Nizhnekamsk	83	(8)
2004–2006	FC Khimki	68	(8)
2007–2008	FC Tom Tomsk	1	(0)
2008	FC Torpedo Moscow	40	(6)
2009	FC Irtysh Omsk	20	(2)
2010	FC Neftekhimik Nizhnekamsk	18	(0)

International career
2000	Russia U-21	1	(0)
- * Club domestic league appearances and goals

Sergei Aleksandrovich Lebedkov (Russian: Серге́й Александрович Лебедков; born 26 March 1981) is a Russian former professional football player.

== Playing career ==
He made his debut in the Russian Premier League in 2000 for FC Spartak Moscow.

== Honours ==
- Russian Premier League champion: 2000.
- Russian Cup finalist: 2005.
