= Vasili Yablonskiy =

Russian footballer

Personal information
- Full name: Vasili Aleksandrovich Yablonskiy
- Date of birth: 2 January 1980 (age 46)
- Height: 1.76 m (5 ft 9 1/2 in)
- Position: Forward

Senior career*
Years	Team	Apps	(Gls)
1997–2000	FC Uralan Elista	9	(0)
2000	FC Metallurg Krasnoyarsk	27	(6)
2001	FC Arsenal Tula	24	(2)
2002–2003	FC Krasnodar-2000	50	(18)
2004	FC Dynamo Krasnodar		
2005	FC Elista (amateur)		
2006	FC Elista	16	(6)
2006	FC Spartak-UGP Anapa	12	(2)
2007	FC Sokol Saratov	8	(0)
2007	FC Volgar-Gazprom-2 Astrakhan (amateur)		
2008	FC Laba Labinsk		
2009	FC Biolog Novokubansk (amateur)		
- * Club domestic league appearances and goals

Vasili Aleksandrovich Yablonskiy (Russian: Василий Александрович Яблонский; born 2 January 1980) is a former Russian football player.
