= Sergei Pyatikopov =

Russian footballer and coach

Personal information
- Full name: Sergei Leonidovich Pyatikopov
- Date of birth: 23 June 1978 (age 48)
- Place of birth: Izhevsk, Russian SFSR
- Height: 1.90 m (6 ft 3 in)
- Positions: Defender; midfielder

Team information
- Current team: FC Zenit-Izhevsk (assistant coach)

Youth career
- SDYuSShOR Izhevsk

Senior career*
Years	Team	Apps	(Gls)
1995–1998	FC Dynamo Izhevsk	85	(15)
1998	FC Gazovik-Gazprom Izhevsk	8	(0)
1999	FC Dynamo Izhevsk	24	(10)
2000–2003	FC Gazovik-Gazprom Izhevsk	105	(10)
2004	FC Metallurg-Kuzbass Novokuznetsk	41	(5)
2005–2006	FC Ural Yekaterinburg	16	(0)
2006	FC Lada Togliatti	7	(0)
2007–2008	FC SOYUZ-Gazprom Izhevsk	52	(10)
2009–2014	FC Yenisey Krasnoyarsk	138	(24)
2018	FC Zenit-Izhevsk	0	(0)

Managerial career
- 2019–: FC Zenit-Izhevsk (assistant)
- * Club domestic league appearances and goals

Sergei Leonidovich Pyatikopov (Russian: Серге́й Леонидович Пятикопов; born 23 June 1978) is a Russian professional football coach and a former player. He is an assistant coach with FC Zenit-Izhevsk.

== Club career ==
He made his Russian Football National League debut for FC Gazovik-Gazprom Izhevsk on 2 July 1998 in a game against FC Druzhba Maykop.

== Honours ==
- Russian Second Division, Zone East best defender: 2009, 2010.
