= Rasim Khutov =

Russian footballer

Personal information
- Full name: Rasim Inalyevich Khutov
- Date of birth: 9 July 1981 (age 45)
- Height: 1.86 m (6 ft 1 in)
- Positions: Forward; midfielder

Youth career
- SUOR Stavropol
- Dynamo Stavropol

Senior career*
Years	Team	Apps	(Gls)
1998	FC Nart Cherkessk	0	(0)
1998	Dynamo Stavropol	2	(0)
1999	FC Beshtau Lermontov	3	(1)
1999–2001	FC Lada Togliatti	64	(9)
2002–2004	Dynamo Stavropol	70	(38)
2005–2006	Dynamo Makhachkala	39	(11)
2007	Chernomorets Novorossiysk	7	(1)
2008	Spartak Nalchik	0	(0)
2009	FC Stavropol	5	(0)
2012	Narzan Kislovodsk (amateur)		
- * Club domestic league appearances and goals

Rasim Inalyevich Khutov (Russian: Расим Инальевич Хутов; 9 July 1981) is a Russian retired professional footballer who played as a forward or midfielder.

== Club career ==
Khutov played five seasons in the Russian Football National League for Dynamo Stavropol, FC Lada Togliatti and Dynamo Makhachkala.

== Honours ==
- Russian Second Division Zone South best player: 2004
