= Konstantin Veselovskiy =

Russian footballer

Personal information
- Full name: Konstantin Mikhailovich Veselovskiy
- Date of birth: 21 April 1974 (age 52)
- Place of birth: Moscow, Russian SFSR
- Height: 1.78 m (5 ft 10 in)
- Position: Forward

Youth career
- FC Spartak Moscow

Senior career*
Years	Team	Apps	(Gls)
1991–1994	FC Spartak Moscow	0	(0)
1992–1994	→ FC Spartak-d Moscow	83	(8)
1995	FC Lokomotiv Nizhny Novgorod	10	(0)
1996	FC Dynamo Stavropol	7	(0)
1996	→ FC Dynamo-d Stavropol (loan)	1	(1)
1997–2000	FC Torpedo-ZIL Moscow	116	(12)
2001–2003	FC Shatura		
2004–2005	FC Istra (amateur)		
2006–2007	FC Troitsk-2001 Troitsk		
2008–2010	FC Oka Stupino (amateur)		
- * Club domestic league appearances and goals

Konstantin Mikhailovich Veselovskiy (Russian: Константин Михайлович Веселовский; born 21 April 1974 in Moscow) is a former Russian football player.
