= Rashid Muradymov =

Russian footballer

Personal information
- Full name: Rashid Kamilevich Muradymov
- Date of birth: 10 March 1977 (age 49)
- Height: 1.82 m (5 ft 11 1/2 in)
- Position: Defender

Senior career*
Years	Team	Apps	(Gls)
1996–1997	FC KAMAZ-Chally Naberezhnye Chelny	2	(0)
1996–1997	→ FC KAMAZ-d Naberezhnye Chelny (loans)	38	(0)
1997	FC Neftekhimik Nizhnekamsk	3	(0)
1998–1999	FC KAMAZ-Chally Naberezhnye Chelny	55	(3)
2000–2001	FC Gazovik-Gazprom Izhevsk	31	(0)
2002	FC Metallurg-Metiznik Magnitogorsk	13	(0)
2002–2003	FC Alnas Almetyevsk	23	(5)
2004	FC Saturn Naberezhnye Chelny (amateur)		
- * Club domestic league appearances and goals

Rashid Kamilevich Muradymov (Russian: Рашид Камилевич Мурадымов; born 10 March 1977) is a former Russian football player.
