= Aleksandr Kuzmichyov =

Russian footballer

Personal information
- Full name: Aleksandr Vladimirovich Kuzmichyov
- Date of birth: 23 April 1971 (age 55)
- Place of birth: Moscow, Russian SFSR
- Height: 1.80 m (5 ft 11 in)
- Positions: Midfielder; striker

Youth career
- Burevestnik Moscow
- Torpedo Moscow

Senior career*
Years	Team	Apps	(Gls)
1987–1989	Torpedo Moscow	0	(0)
1990	Oka Kolomna	9	(1)
1990–1991	Torpedo Moscow	9	(1)
1992	Lokomotiv Moscow	8	(1)
1992	→ Lokomotiv-d Moscow	3	(0)
1992–1993	Feirense	31	(6)
1993–1994	Torpedo Moscow	7	(0)
1993–1994	→ Torpedo-d Moscow	37	(17)
1995	Lokomotiv NN	12	(2)
1995–1997	Arsenal Tula	97	(64)
1998–1999	Rubin Kazan	41	(15)
2000	KAMAZ	3	(0)
2000	Arsenal Tula	14	(0)
2001	Severstal	3	(1)
2001	Vityaz	10	(0)
2002	Arsenal Tula	27	(6)
2003	FC Reutov	28	(5)

Managerial career
- 2004: FC Reutov (assistant)
- 2005–2013: Yunost Moscow Burevestnik
- 2014–2015: Yunost Moscow Burevestnik (deputy director)
- 2016–2018: Academy FC Lokomotiv Moscow
- 2020–2024: Academy FC Torpedo Moscow
- * Club domestic league appearances and goals

Aleksandr Vladimirovich Kuzmichyov (Russian: Александр Владимирович Кузьмичёв; born 23 April 1971) is a former Russian professional footballer who played as either a midfielder or striker.

== Honours ==
=== Team ===
- Soviet Cup: Runner-up 1991

=== Individual ===
- Russian Second Division (West Zone): Top scorer 1997 (33 goals)
