= Andrei Silyutin =

Russian footballer

Personal information
- Full name: Andrei Anatolyevich Silyutin
- Date of birth: 1 October 1976 (age 50)
- Place of birth: Barnaul, Russian SFSR
- Height: 1.87 m (6 ft 1 1/2 in)
- Position: Midfielder

Senior career*
Years	Team	Apps	(Gls)
1993–1994	FC Politekhnik-92 Barnaul	30	(0)
1995–1999	FC Dynamo Barnaul	156	(28)
2000–2004	FC Tom Tomsk	133	(8)
2005	FC Aktobe	27	(3)
2006	FC Anzhi Makhachkala	14	(0)
2006	FC Zvezda Irkutsk	18	(1)
2007	FC Dynamo Barnaul	28	(4)
2008–2009	FC Volga Nizhny Novgorod	54	(4)
2010–2013	FC Dynamo Barnaul	66	(2)
- * Club domestic league appearances and goals

Andrei Anatolyevich Silyutin (Russian: Андрей Анатольевич Силютин; born 1 October 1976) is a former Russian professional footballer.

== Club career ==
He made his Russian Football National League debut for FC Tom Tomsk on 9 April 2000 in a game against FC Nosta Novotroitsk. He played 7 seasons in the FNL for Tom, FC Anzhi Makhachkala and FC Volga Nizhny Novgorod.

== Honours ==
- Kazakhstan Premier League champion: 2005.
