= Leo Nelson =

Russian footballer

Personal information
- Full name: Avua-Siav Leo Tomovich Nelson
- Date of birth: 8 August 1980 (age 46)
- Place of birth: Moscow, Russian SFSR
- Height: 1.88 m (6 ft 2 in)
- Position: Defensive midfielder

Youth career
- CSKA Moscow

Senior career*
Years	Team	Apps	(Gls)
1998	Torpedo-d Moscow	11	(0)
2000	Spartak Tambov	6	(1)
2000	Metallurg Lipetsk	7	(0)
2001	Zhenis Astana	30	(7)
2003	Vidnoye	24	(1)
2004	Gazovik Orenburg	31	(4)
2005	Gomel	12	(0)
2005–2007	Nara-Desna Naro-Fominsk	52	(4)
2007–2008	Torpedo-RG Moscow	35	(1)
2009	Ryazan	4	(0)
2010	Olimp Fryazino		
- * Club domestic league appearances and goals

Avua-Siav Leo Tomovich Nelson (Russian: Авуа-Сиав Лео Томович Нельсон; born 8 August 1980), or simply Leo Nelson, is a Russian retired professional footballer.

== Club career ==
He played in the Russian Football National League for FC Metallurg Lipetsk in 2000.

== International career ==
He was the first player of African descent to represent Russia internationally on any level (he played for the Under-19 national team).

== Personal life ==
His father is from Ghana and his mother is Russian.
