= Sergey Kiselyov (footballer) =

Russian footballer

Personal information
- Full name: Sergey Leonidovich Kiselyov
- Date of birth: 31 May 1976 (age 50)
- Place of birth: Leningrad, Soviet Union (now Russia)
- Height: 1.80 m (5 ft 11 in)
- Positions: Defender; midfielder

Team information
- Current team: Zenit U21 (assistant)

Senior career*
Years	Team	Apps	(Gls)
1995	FC Hämeenlinna	6	(0)
1996–2000	FC Lokomotiv St. Petersburg	109	(0)
1996–1997	FC Lokomotiv-d St. Petersburg	43	(1)
2001–2004	FC Baltika Kaliningrad	124	(3)
2005	FC Oryol	35	(0)
2006–2007	FC Lukhovitsy	28	(0)
2008	FC Dynamo Bryansk	17	(0)
2009	FC Sever Murmansk	12	(0)

Managerial career
- 2010–2022: Zenit St. Petersburg (academy)
- 2022–2026: Zenit-2 St. Petersburg (assistant)
- 2026–: Zenit U21 (assistant)
- * Club domestic league appearances and goals

Sergey Leonidovich Kiselyov (Russian: Серге́й Леонидович Киселёв; born 31 May 1976) is a Russian professional football coach and a former player. He is an assistant coach with Zenit-2 St. Petersburg.

== Club career ==
He played 10 seasons in the Russian Football National League for 4 different clubs.
