= Milá (footballer) =

Brazilian footballer

Personal information
- Full name: Reginelson Aparecido Paulino Quaresma
- Date of birth: 21 May 1977 (age 49)
- Place of birth: Taquarituba, Brazil
- Height: 1.75 m (5 ft 9 in)
- Position: Midfielder

Senior career*
Years	Team	Apps	(Gls)
1994	Joinville		
1995–1997	Corinthians de Presidente Prudente		
1998–1999	Independente de Limeira		
2000	FC Uralan Elista	17	(1)
2001	Independente de Limeira		
2001	Inter de Limeira		
2002	Oeste		
2002–2003	Penafiel	3	(0)
2003–2004	Sertãozinho		
2004	São Bento		
2005	XV de Piracicaba		
2005	Barretos		
2005	Oeste		
2006	Monte Azul		
2006	Itararé		
2007	Portuguesa Santista		
2007	SERC		
2007–2008	Independente de Limeira		
2008	Portuguesa Santista		
2010	Capivariano		
2012	Elosport		
- * Club domestic league appearances and goals

Reginelson Aparecido Paulino Quaresma or simply Milá (born 21 May 1977 in Taquarituba) is a Brazilian former footballer who played as a midfielder.

Milá played for F.C. Penafiel in the 2003–04 Segunda Liga.
