= Oleh Tereshchenko =

Ukrainian footballer

Personal information
- Full name: Oleh Ivanovych Tereshchenko
- Date of birth: 13 January 1972 (age 54)
- Place of birth: Dnipropetrovsk, Ukrainian SSR
- Height: 1.80 m (5 ft 11 in)
- Positions: Defender; midfielder

Youth career
- Dnipro-75 Dnipropetrovsk

Senior career*
Years	Team	Apps	(Gls)
1989	FC Shakhtar Pavlohrad	2	(0)
1991–1992	SKA Kyiv	64	(3)
1992–1993	CSK ZSU Kyiv	33	(1)
1993	FC Tekstilshchik Kamyshin	1	(0)
1993	FC Zvezda-Rus Gorodishche	9	(0)
1993–1994	CSK ZSU Kyiv		
1994–2000	FC Uralan Elista	185	(5)
2000–2001	FC Sokol Saratov	15	(0)
2001	FC Fakel Voronezh	13	(0)
2002	FC Volgar-Gazprom Astrakhan	13	(0)
2003	FC Vidnoye	15	(0)
2003	FC Spartak Shchyolkovo	12	(0)
- * Club domestic league appearances and goals

Oleh Ivanovych Tereshchenko (Ukrainian: Олег Іванович Терещенко; Russian: Терещенко Олег Иванович; born 13 January 1972) is a former Ukrainian professional footballer.

== Club career ==
He made his professional debut in the Soviet Second League in 1989 for FC Shakhtar Pavlohrad.
