= Maksim Yermak =

Ukrainian and Russian footballer

Personal information
- Full name: Maksim Yuryevich Yermak
- Date of birth: 11 November 1976 (age 49)
- Height: 1.84 m (6 ft 1/2 in)
- Position: Forward

Senior career*
Years	Team	Apps	(Gls)
1996–1997	FC Metalurh Donetsk	0	(0)
1997	FC Metalurh-2 Donetsk	12	(2)
1998	PFC Nyva Vinnytsia	13	(1)
1998–1999	FC Podillya Khmelnytskyi	25	(1)
1999–2004	FC Kuban Krasnodar	132	(36)
2004	FC Khimki	23	(3)
2005	FC Zhenis	15	(3)
2006	FC Volgar-Gazprom Astrakhan	42	(7)
2007–2008	FC Salyut-Energiya Belgorod	64	(9)
- * Club domestic league appearances and goals as of 1 January 2009

Maksim Yuryevich Yermak (Russian: Максим Юрьевич Ермак; Ukrainian: Максим Юрійович Єрмак; born 11 November 1976) is a former Russian and Ukrainian professional footballer. He and his family fled Russian persecution due to being Jehovah’s Witnesses.

== Honours ==
- Russian Cup finalist: 2005 (played in the early stages of the 2004/05 tournament for FC Khimki).
