= Igor Vekovishchev =

Russian footballer

Personal information
- Full name: Igor Vladimirovich Vekovishchev
- Date of birth: 6 March 1977 (age 49)
- Place of birth: Moscow, Russian SFSR
- Height: 1.82 m (5 ft 11 1/2 in)
- Positions: Forward; midfielder

Senior career*
Years	Team	Apps	(Gls)
1994–1996	FC TRASKO Moscow	83	(22)
1996–1997	PFC CSKA-d Moscow	45	(9)
1998	FC KAMAZ-Chally Naberezhnye Chelny	32	(9)
1999–2003	FC Metallurg Lipetsk	161	(48)
2004	FC Lukoil Chelyabinsk	13	(4)
2005	FC Lokomotiv-M Serpukhov	20	(5)
2006	FC Lobnya-Alla Lobnya	28	(4)
2007	FC Zelenograd	29	(9)
2008	FC Istra	14	(4)
2009	FC Zelenograd	25	(5)
- * Club domestic league appearances and goals

Igor Vladimirovich Vekovishchev (Russian: Игорь Владимирович Вековищев; born 6 March 1977) is a former Russian professional football player.

== Club career ==
He played 4 seasons in the Russian Football National League for FC KAMAZ-Chally Naberezhnye Chelny and FC Metallurg Lipetsk.
