= FC Uralan Plus Moscow =

- Full name: Football Club Uralan Plus Moscow
- Founded: 1997
- Dissolved: 2003

FC Uralan Plus Moscow (Russian: «Уралан-ПЛЮС» (Москва)) was a Russian football team from Moscow. It played professionally from 2000 to 2003 in the Russian Second Division. Their best result was 3rd place in Zone Center in 2002 season. In 2003 season they dropped out of the competition after 8 games due to lack of financing.

== Team name history ==
- 1997–1999: FC Moskabelmet Moscow
- 2000–2001: FC Lotto-MKM Moscow
- 2002–2003: FC Uralan Plus Moscow
