= Oleg Stogov =

Russian footballer

Personal information
- Full name: Oleg Valeryevich Stogov
- Date of birth: 15 April 1965 (age 61)
- Place of birth: Vladimir, Russian SFSR
- Height: 1.74 m (5 ft 9 in)
- Position: Midfielder

Team information
- Current team: FC Tyumen (assistant coach)

Youth career
- Motor Vladimir

Senior career*
Years	Team	Apps	(Gls)
1984	FC Torpedo Vladimir	32	(8)
1985	FC SKA Khabarovsk	20	(0)
1985–1986	PFC CSKA Moscow	12	(0)
1986–1987	FC SKA Khabarovsk	21	(0)
1987	FC Fakel Voronezh	19	(1)
1988–1994	FC Rotor Volgograd	187	(25)
1995	FC Lokomotiv Nizhny Novgorod	6	(0)
1996–1998	FC Metallurg Lipetsk	78	(15)
1998–1999	FC Sokol Saratov	43	(7)
2000	FC Spartak-Chukotka Moscow	11	(5)
2000–2003	FC Arsenal Tula	62	(9)

Managerial career
- 2004–2006: FC Torpedo Vladimir
- 2007: FK Jūrmala
- 2007–2008: FC Rotor Volgograd
- 2009–2010: FC Rubin-2 Kazan
- 2011: FC Khimik Dzerzhinsk
- 2016–2017: FC Khimki (assistant)
- 2017: FC Khimki
- 2018: FC Khimki (assistant)
- 2019–2020: FC Smolensk
- 2020–2021: FC Murom
- 2024–: FC Tyumen (assistant)
- * Club domestic league appearances and goals

Oleg Valeryevich Stogov (Russian: Олег Валерьевич Стогов; born 15 April 1965) is a Russian professional football coach and a former player. He is an assistant coach with FC Tyumen.

== Playing career ==
He made his debut in the Soviet First League in 1985 for FC SKA Khabarovsk. Stogov played for FC Metallurg Lipetsk in the Russian First Division and Russian Second Division from 1996 until 1998.

== Honours ==
- Russian Premier League runner-up: 1993.
- Russian Second Division Zone West best manager: 2004.
