= FC Khopyor Balashov =

Russian football club

- Full name: Football Club Khopyor Balashov
- Founded: 1993

FC Khopyor Balashov (Russian: «Хопёр» (Балашов)) is a Russian football team from Balashov. It played professionally from 2000 to 2002 in the Russian Second Division. Their best result was 14th place in Zone Povolzhye in 2001.
