= FC Aruan Nartkala =

- Full name: Football Club Aruan Nartkala
- Founded: 1995
- Dissolved: 2007
- League: Amateur Football League, Zone South
- 2006: 16th

FC Aruan Nartkala (Russian: «Аруан» (Нарткала)) was a Russian football team from Nartkala. It played professionally from 1995 to 2002. Their best result was 9th place in Zone South of the Russian Second Division in 2000.

== Team name history ==
- 1995 FC Spartak-2 Nartkala
- 1996–2002 FC Nart Nartkala
- 2003–2006 FC Aruan Nartkala
