= FC Diana Volzhsk =

Russian football team

- Full name: Football Club Diana Volzhsk
- Founded: 1993
- Dissolved: 2003
- League: Russian Second Division, Zone Povolzhye
- 2002: 14th

FC Diana Volzhsk (Russian: «Диана» (Волжск)) was a Russian football team from Volzhsk. It played professionally from 1998 to 2002. Their best result was 6th place in the Zone Povolzhye of the Russian Second Division in 1998 and 1999.
