= FC Oazis Yartsevo =

- Full name: Football Club Oazis Yartsevo
- Founded: 1998
- Dissolved: 2001
- League: Russian Second Division, Zone West
- 2001: 18th

FC Oazis Yartsevo (Russian: ФК «Оазис» (Ярцево)) was a football team from Yartsevo, Russia. It played professionally from 1999 to 2001. Their best result was 12th place in the Russian Second Division Zone West in 1999.
