= Vadim Yevseyev =

Russian footballer (born 1976)

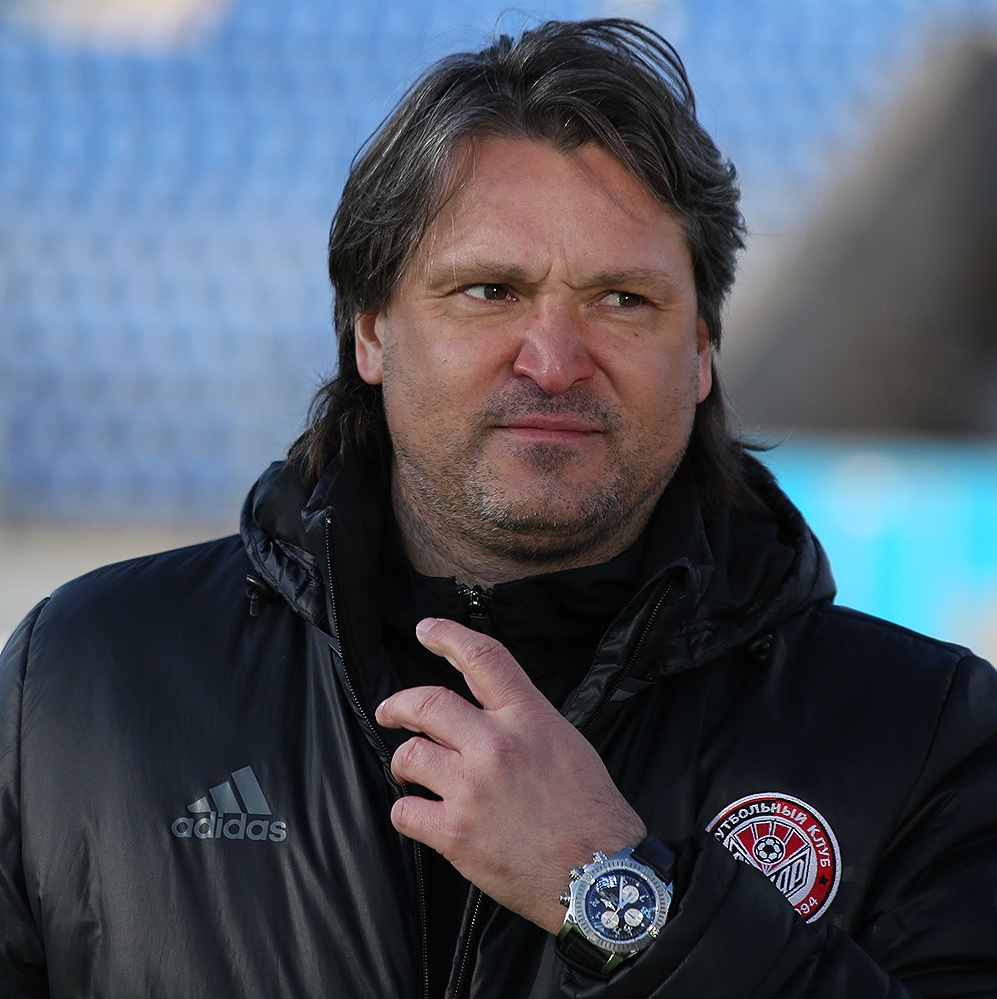
- Yevseyev coaching Amkar in 2018

Personal information
- Full name: Vadim Valentinovich Yevseyev
- Date of birth: 8 January 1976 (age 50)
- Place of birth: Mytishchi, Soviet Union
- Height: 1.80 m (5 ft 11 in)
- Positions: Right-back; left-back

Team information
- Current team: Dynamo Makhachkala (manager)

Senior career*
Years	Team	Apps	(Gls)
1993–1999	Spartak Moscow	91	(5)
1993–1999	→ Spartak-d Moscow	88	(11)
1998	→ Torpedo Moscow (loan)	10	(0)
2000–2006	Lokomotiv Moscow	129	(16)
2007	Torpedo Moscow	20	(4)
2007–2010	Saturn Ramenskoye	48	(3)
2011	Torpedo-BelAZ Zhodino	25	(4)
2012	Arsenal Tula	5	(1)
2012	Olimpik Mytishchi	5	(0)
Total		421	(44)

International career
1996–1998	Russia U21	13	(0)
1999–2005	Russia	20	(1)

Managerial career
- 2012–2015: Tekstilshchik Ivanovo (assistant)
- 2015–2017: Amkar Perm (assistant)
- 2017: Tekstilshchik Ivanovo
- 2017–2018: Amkar Perm (assistant)
- 2018: Amkar Perm
- 2018: Anzhi Makhachkala (assistant)
- 2018–2019: SKA-Khabarovsk
- 2019–2020: Ufa
- 2021–2023: Shinnik Yaroslavl
- 2023: Fakel Voronezh
- 2023–2024: Kuban Krasnodar
- 2024–2025: Leningradets
- 2025: Chernomorets Novorossiysk
- 2025–: Dynamo Makhachkala
- * Club domestic league appearances and goals

Vadim Valentinovich Yevseyev (Russian: Вади́м Валенти́нович Евсе́ев, IPA: [vɐˈdʲim vəlʲɪnʲˈtʲinəvʲɪtɕ jɪfˈsʲe(j)ɪf]; born 8 January 1976) is a Russian football coach and a former player who is the manager of Dynamo Makhachkala.

Mainly a right-back, he spent most of his club career with Spartak Moscow and Lokomotiv Moscow. At the international level, he made 20 appearances for the Russia national team and scored one goal, which helped Russia secure their spot at the UEFA Euro 2004.

== Club career ==
Yevseyev started to play for the Dynamo football school. In 1990, after having been left out of the international tournament in France, he moved to the Lokomotiv school. After two years at Spartak Mytishchi, in 1993 he was invited to play for the reserve team of Spartak Moscow.

He debuted for the Spartak's first team on 6 March 1996, in the Champions League quarterfinal against Nantes. In 1998 Yevseyev spent the second half of the season on loan in Torpedo Moscow.

Yevseyev played in Lokomotiv Moscow since 2000. He was then dropped to the reserve team in 2006 after having an argument with the new manager Anatoly Byshovets. By the start of the 2007 Russian Premier League he was in newly relegated to the First Division Torpedo Moscow, but failed to accommodate and was subsequently sold to Saturn Moscow Oblast in the summer of 2007.

In his farewell friendly match he was substituted for the 5-year-old son of a children's charity director, who went on to score.

== International career ==
Yevseyev debuted in the national team on 31 March 1999 in a match against Andorra. His only goal for Russia was scored on 19 November 2003 in a Euro 2004 qualification playoff against Wales at the Millennium Stadium. This goal was the only one in a two-leg tie. Yevseyev's post-match reaction (namely, shouting Russian profanities into the camera) has been subject of much media attention in Russia. He dedicated the victory to his 4-year-old daughter, who had just been through a heart surgery.

== Coaching career ==
On 27 March 2019, he signed a two-year contract as a manager of Russian Premier League FC Ufa. On 7 October 2020, he left Ufa by mutual consent.

On 1 June 2021, he signed with Shinnik Yaroslavl, freshly relegated to the third-tier FNL 2. On 16 May 2022, Shinnik secured their promotion back to Russian Football National League after one season down.

On 1 May 2023, five rounds before the end of the 2022–23 Russian Premier League season, Yevseyev was appointed as the manager of Fakel Voronezh, hoping to secure the club from relegation. Fakel avoided relegation by defeating Yenisey Krasnoyarsk in the relegation play-offs. Yevseyev was dismissed by Fakel on 5 September 2023, following weak start to the 2023–24 season.

On 12 September 2023, Yevseyev was hired by Russian First League club Kuban Krasnodar. He left Kuban by mutual consent on 8 April 2024.

On 29 December 2025, Yevseyev joined Dynamo Makhachkala in the Russian Premier League. By the end of the regular season, the team avoided direct relegation into the First League, proceeding into the promotion/relegation play-offs. Coincidentally, the draw between Dynamo Makhachkala and Spartak Moscow on 17 May 2026, the last matchday of the season, had helped Lokomotiv Moscow finish third in the Premier League despite losing their own game to CSKA Moscow and, therefore, putting Spartak Moscow in control of the situation. For the indirect contribution to his team's eventual success, Lokomotiv Moscow manager Mikhail Galaktionov praised Yevseyev and wished Dynamo Makhachkala to stay in the Premier League for the next season. In the relegation playoffs, Dynamo defeated Ural Yekaterinburg 3–0 on aggregate and remained in the Premier League.

== Style of play ==
Yevseyev was mainly a right-sided full-back or wing-back, also capable of playing on the left or, on few occasions, as a centre-back. He was known for his physical strength, stamina, and opportunism in attack. Despite average height, he was also good at jumping and heading the ball, a skill that helped him score a number of goals at set pieces.

== Career statistics ==
Scores and results list Russia's goal tally first.

No.	Date	Venue	Opponent	Score	Result	Competition
1.	19 November 2003	Millennium Stadium, Cardiff, Wales	Wales	1–0	1–0	Euro 2004 qualifying playoff

== Honours ==
Spartak Moscow

- Russian Premier League: 1996, 1997, 1998, 1999
- Russian Cup: 1998

Lokomotiv Moscow

- Russian Premier League: 2002, 2004
- Russian Cup: 2000, 2001
- Russian Super Cup: 2003
