= FC Mozdok =

- Full name: Football Club Mozdok
- Founded: 1968
- Dissolved: 2006
- League: Amateur Football League, Zone South
- 2005: 13th

FC Mozdok (Russian: «Моздок», 1968–2006) was a Russian football team from Mozdok. It played professionally in 1968–1969 and 1994–2002. Their best result was 6th place in Zone 4 of the Soviet First League in 1969.

== Team name history ==
- 1968–1995 FC Iriston Mozdok
- 1996–2006 FC Mozdok
