= FC Mosenergo Moscow =

- Full name: Football Club Mosenergo Moscow
- Founded: 1980
- Dissolved: 2004
- League: Russian Second Division, Zone West
- 2003: 12th

FC Mosenergo Moscow (Russian: «Мосэнерго» (Москва)) was a Russian football team from Moscow. It played professionally from 1992 to 2003. Their best result was 4th place in the Zone West of the Russian Second Division in 1998 and 2001.
