= Yury Syomin =

Russian football coach (born 1947)

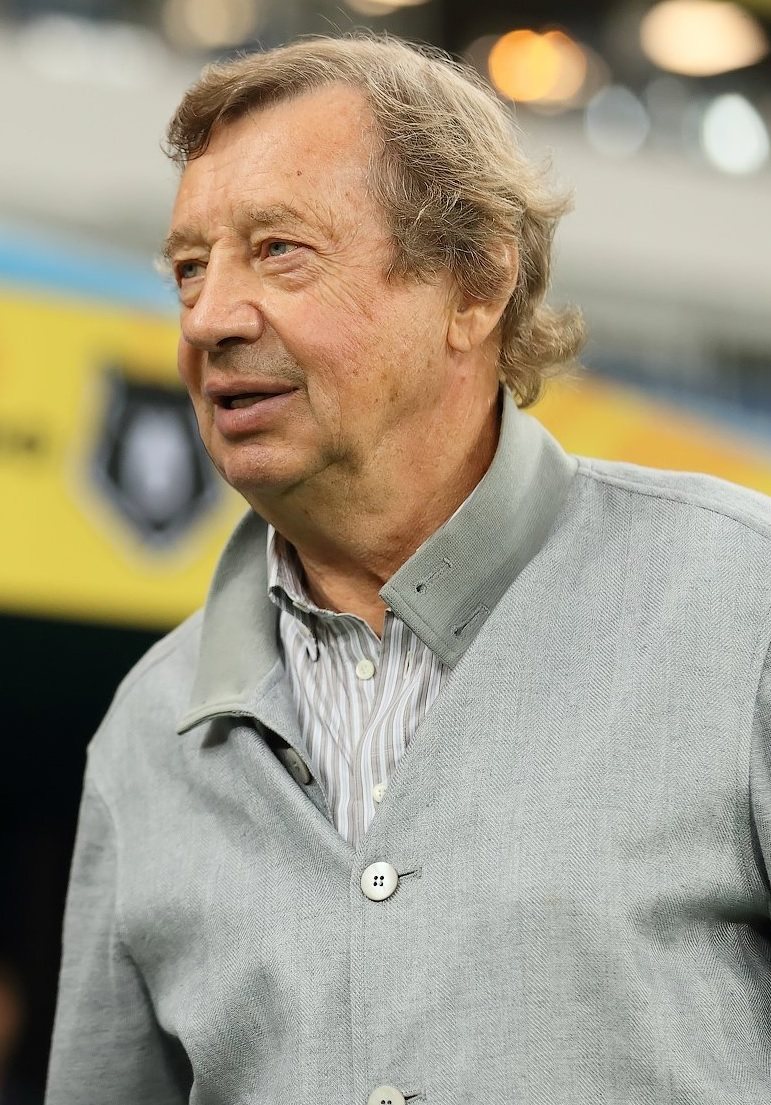
- Syomin with FC Rostov in 2021

Personal information
- Full name: Yury Pavlovich Syomin
- Date of birth: 11 May 1947 (age 79)
- Place of birth: Orenburg, Russian SFSR, Soviet Union
- Height: 1.76 m (5 ft 9 in)
- Position: Forward

Senior career*
Years	Team	Apps	(Gls)
1964–1965	FC Oryol	16	(6)
1965–1967	Spartak Moscow	43	(6)
1968–1971	Dynamo Moscow	95	(19)
1972–1973	Kairat	43	(5)
1974	Chkalovets Novosibirsk	27	(4)
1975–1977	Lokomotiv Moscow	78	(9)
1978–1980	Kuban	84	(15)
Total		386	(67)

Managerial career
- 1983–1985: Pomir Dushanbe
- 1986–1990: Lokomotiv Moscow
- 1991: New Zealand Olympic
- 1992–2005: Lokomotiv Moscow
- 2005: Russia
- 2005–2006: Dynamo Moscow
- 2007–2009: Dynamo Kyiv
- 2009–2010: Lokomotiv Moscow
- 2010–2012: Dynamo Kyiv
- 2013–2014: Gabala
- 2014–2015: Mordovia Saransk
- 2015: Anzhi Makhachkala
- 2016–2020: Lokomotiv Moscow
- 2021: Rostov
- * Club domestic league appearances and goals

Yury Pavlovich Syomin (Russian: Юрий Павлович Сёмин; born 11 May 1947) is a Russian football manager and a former player. He is best known for his time with FC Lokomotiv Moscow, which spanned five decades, from 1986 to 2020 (not consecutively).

== Biography and personal life ==
Syomin was born on 11 May 1947 in Orenburg. His family moved to Oryol some time later. As a child he has showed interest in football, ice hockey, volleyball, and athletics. His son Andrei Syomin is also a player and a coach.

Syomin had been a spectator at every UEFA Champions League final since 1996, with the exception for the 2020 final, played completely behind closed doors.

== Playing career ==
At the age of 16, while still attending school, Syomin started his player career at Spartak Oryol, a Soviet Second League club.

One year later he was invited to Spartak Moscow. He has scored two first Spartak's goals in a European competition (in 1966 against OFK Beograd).

At the age of 20, Syomin changed club again, this time to Dynamo Moscow. With this club, he won his only player's trophy, the 1970 Soviet Cup. He calls the spell with Dynamo the most successful period of his player career.

Syomin left Dynamo due to disagreements with the coach after he was not fielded in a European match. After that he has changed several other clubs. Syomin played for Kairat Almaty, Chkalovets Novosibirsk, Lokomotiv Moscow, and Kuban Krasnodar. He ended his career as a player at the age of 33.

== Coaching career ==
Syomin started his coaching career in 1983, when he was called to save Pamir Dushanbe, a First League team, from relegation. Syomin succeeded and was recognized as the honorary coach of Tajik SSR for this achievement.

In 1986 Syomin went on to coach FC Lokomotiv Moscow, where he spent 19 years. During the period of his work Lokomotiv transformed from a mid-table club to one of the leaders of Russian football, winning the championship in 2002 and 2004. Syomin also enjoyed cup success, winning Russian Cup five times, Russian Super Cup twice and reaching Cup Winners' Cup semifinal twice.

In 2005 Syomin left Lokomotiv for the Russia national team to help it reach the 2006 FIFA World Cup final tournament. He failed to achieve that and decided to leave the national team. In November 2005, Syomin began coaching Dynamo Moscow, but was sacked in 2006. In 2007, he returned to FC Lokomotiv Moscow as club president, but one year later his contract was terminated due to team's low league position.

Later in 2007 Syomin took over the managerial position with FC Dynamo Kyiv in Ukraine and guided the club to a championship in the 2008-09 season as well as a semi-final appearance in the UEFA Cup.

On 26 May 2009 he quit FC Dynamo Kyiv and returned to FC Lokomotiv Moscow. Under the terms of his contract, he was expected to stay with the club until December 2011. Syomin replaced Rashid Rakhimov (who had been fired a few weeks before that). He was fired as Lokomotiv manager on 29 November 2010. On 24 December 2010, he signed a new contract with Dynamo Kyiv ending in 2012.

On 29 May 2013 Syomin was officially unveiled as manager of Gabala of the Azerbaijani Premier League. After leading Gabala to third in the Premier League and as runners up in the Cup, Syomin left Gabala on 23 May 2014.

Syomin was announced as Anzhi Makhachkala manager on 18 June 2015, signing a one-year contract with the option of an additional year. After gaining only 6 points in first 10 games of the 2015-16 season and with Anzhi in last place, Syomin left Anzhi on 29 September 2015.

On 26 August 2016, Lokomotiv Moscow announced new appointment of Syomin as a manager of the team. He won his third title with the team in the 2017–18 season. He also won the 2016–17 Russian Cup and 2018–19 Russian Cup with the club, meaning he won a trophy in each of his three full seasons of this stint with Lokomotiv.

On 14 May 2020, Lokomotiv's board of directors dismissed Syomin as his contract was expiring on 31 May and they decided not to extend it. The Russian Premier League was suspended at the time due to the COVID-19 pandemic in Russia, with Lokomotiv in 2nd position in the standings.

On 4 August 2021, he was hired by FC Rostov on a two-year contract. In the first 6 league games under his management, Rostov won only one, and after Rostov was eliminated from the Russian Cup by a third-tier club FC Chayka Peschanokopskoye, Syomin resigned on 25 September 2021.

== Managerial statistics ==
As of match played 22 September 2021

Managerial record by team and tenure
Team	From	To	Record				
Team	From	To	G	W	D	L	Win %
Kuban Krasnodar	1 September 1982	31 December 1982	12	2	2	8	16.67
Pamir Dushanbe	1 January 1983	31 December 1985	143	62	31	50	43.36
Lokomotiv Moscow	1 January 1986	31 December 1990	204	92	55	57	45.10
New Zealand Olympic	1 January 1991	31 December 1991	12	7	3	2	58.33
Lokomotiv Moscow	1 January 1992	18 April 2005	533	281	126	126	52.72
Russia	18 April 2005	9 November 2005	7	3	4	0	42.86
Dynamo Moscow	21 November 2005	7 August 2006	20	4	7	9	20.00
Dynamo Kyiv	8 December 2007	26 May 2009	67	46	11	10	68.66
Lokomotiv Moscow	1 June 2009	29 November 2010	53	24	15	14	45.28
Dynamo Kyiv	24 December 2010	24 September 2012	77	50	13	14	64.94
Gabala	29 May 2013	23 May 2014	42	23	7	12	54.76
Mordovia	27 May 2014	31 May 2015	33	13	5	15	39.39
Anzhi Makhachkala	18 June 2015	29 September 2015	11	2	3	6	18.18
Lokomotiv Moscow	26 August 2016	31 May 2020	141	72	28	41	51.06
Rostov	4 August 2021	25 September 2021	7	1	3	3	14.29
Total			1,362	682	313	367	50.07

== Honours ==
=== As a player ===
Dynamo Moscow

- Soviet Cup: 1970

=== As a manager ===
Lokomotiv Moscow

- Russian Premier League: 2002, 2004, 2017–18
- Russian Cup: 1995–96, 1996–97, 1999–00, 2000–01, 2016–17, 2018–19
- Russian Super Cup: 2003, 2005, 2019

Dynamo Kyiv

- Ukrainian Premier League: 2008–09

== See also ==
- List of football managers with the most matches
