= FC Balakovo =

- Full name: Football Club Balakovo
- Founded: 1966
- Dissolved: 2002
- League: Russian Second Division, Zone Povolzhye
- 2002: Excluded after 11 games

FC Balakovo (Russian: «Балаково») was a Russian football team from Balakovo. It played professionally from 1966 to 1974 and from 1993 to 2002. Their best result was 2nd place in Zone 4 of the Soviet Second League in 1969.

== Team name history ==
- 1966–1968: FC Khimik Balakovo
- 1969–1992: FC Kord Balakovo
- 1993–1997: FC Volga Balakovo
- 1998–2002: FC Balakovo
