= FC Energetik Uren =

- Full name: Football Club Energetik Uren
- Founded: 1992
- Dissolved: 2008
- League: Russian Second Division, Zone Ural-Povolzhye
- 2008: 16th

FC Energetik Uren (Russian: «Энергетик» (Урень)) was a Russian football team from Uren. It played professionally from 1996 to 2006 and in 2008. Their best result was 4th place in Zone Povolzhye of the Russian Second Division in 1998, 1999, 2001 and 2002.

== Team name history ==
- 1992–1997: FC Energetik Uren
- 1998: FC Energiya Uren
- 1999–2008: FC Energetik Uren
