= FC Lokomotiv Saint Petersburg =

- Full name: Football Club Lokomotiv Saint Petersburg
- Founded: 1936; 89 years ago
- Dissolved: 2006; 19 years ago
- 2005: Amateur Football League, Zone North-West, 3rd

FC Lokomotiv Saint Petersburg (Russian: ФК «Локомотив» Санкт‑Петербург) was a Russian football team from Saint Petersburg. It played professionally in 1969 and from 1992 to 2000, including 5 seasons (1996 to 2000) in the second-highest Russian First Division. In 1996 the team merged with FC Saturn-1991 Saint Petersburg and played for one season as FC Lokomotiv-Saturn Saint Petersburg.

== Reserve squad ==
Lokomotiv's reserve squad played professionally as FC Lokomotiv-d St. Petersburg in the Russian Third League in 1996–1997.
