= 1998 Russian Second Division =

Russian Second Division
- Season: 1998

The 1998 Russian Second Division was the seventh edition of the Russian Second Division. The competition was renamed from Russian Second League to Russian Second Division this year. Russian Third League was dissolved this season and Second Division became once again the lowest level of professional football in Russia. There were 6 zones with 119 teams starting the competition (5 were excluded before the end of the season).

== Zone West ==
=== Overview ===
Team	Head coach
FC Torpedo-ZIL Moscow	Sergei Petrenko (until September); Boris Ignatyev (from September)
FC Spartak Shchyolkovo	Leonid Shevchenko
FC Dynamo-2 Moscow	Aleksei Petrushin
FC Mosenergo Moscow	Valentin Sysoyev
FC Spartak-2 Moscow	Sergey Rodionov
FC Zenit-2 St. Petersburg	Lev Burchalkin
FC Avtomobilist Noginsk	Aleksei Koryagin (until June); Igor Volchok (from June)
FC Dynamo St. Petersburg	Boris Rappoport
FC Dynamo Vologda	Leon Yagubyants
FC Khimki	A.N. Dementyev (until August); Igor Bychkov (August to September); Ravil Sabitov (from September)
FC Energiya Velikiye Luki	Vladimir Kosogov
PFC CSKA-2 Moscow	Vyacheslav Komarov/Sergei Berezin
FC Sportakademklub Moscow	Aleksandr Yefremov
FC Volochanin Vyshny Volochyok	Viktor Demidov
FC Volga Tver	Vladimir Seleznyov
FC Neftyanik Yaroslavl	Aleksandr Samygin (until May); Valentin Volkov (caretaker, May); Viktor Fomin (from May)
FC Torpedo-2 Moscow	Vadim Nikonov/Sergei Petrenko (from September)
FC Lokomotiv-2 Moscow	Andrei Syomin
FC Spartak Kostroma	Andrei Kononov (until September); Aleksandr Bogdanov (from September)
FC Krasnoznamensk-Selyatino Krasnoznamensk	N.A. Kosyuk (until June); Viktor Nozdrin (June to October); Vladimir Bondarenko (from October)
FC Monolit Moscow	Yuri Vereykin
FC Pskov	Sergei Markelov

=== Standings ===
Pos	Team	Pld	W	D	L	GF	GA	GD	Pts	Qualification or relegation
1	Torpedo-ZIL Moscow (A)	40	28	6	6	90	30	+60	90	Qualification to Promotion play-offs
2	Spartak Shchyolkovo	40	23	9	8	65	30	+35	78	
3	Dynamo-2 Moscow (Note: FC Dynamo-d Moscow renamed to FC Dynamo-2.)	40	22	9	9	66	37	+29	75	
4	Mosenergo Moscow	40	21	12	7	56	35	+21	75	
5	Spartak-2 Moscow (Note: FC Spartak-d Moscow renamed to FC Spartak-2.)	40	21	11	8	94	50	+44	74	
6	Zenit-2 St. Petersburg (Note: FC Zenit-d St. Petersburg renamed to FC Zenit-2.)	40	22	7	11	68	42	+26	73	
7	Avtomobilist Noginsk	40	21	10	9	58	32	+26	73	
8	Dynamo St. Petersburg	40	21	9	10	47	27	+20	72	
9	Dynamo Vologda	40	16	11	13	52	46	+6	59	
10	Khimki	40	15	8	17	63	60	+3	53	
11	Energiya Velikiye Luki	40	15	8	17	58	80	−22	53	
12	CSKA-2 Moscow (Note: PFC CSKA-d Moscow renamed to PFC CSKA-2.)	40	14	5	21	69	78	−9	47	
13	Sportakademklub Moscow	40	13	8	19	47	72	−25	47	
14	Volochanin Vyshny Volochyok	40	11	13	16	39	64	−25	46	
15	Volga Tver	40	12	9	19	34	41	−7	45	
16	Neftyanik Yaroslavl	40	12	9	19	46	66	−20	45	
17	Torpedo-2 Moscow (Note: FC Torpedo-Luzhniki-d Moscow renamed to FC Torpedo-2.)	40	11	6	23	59	81	−22	39	
18	Lokomotiv-2 Moscow (Note: FC Lokomotiv-d Moscow renamed to FC Lokomotiv-2.)	40	8	10	22	53	80	−27	34	
19	Spartak Kostroma	40	8	8	24	40	83	−43	32	
20	Krasnoznamensk-Selyatino Krasnoznamensk (Note: FC MChS-Selyatino Selyatino renamed to FC Krasnoznamensk-Selyatino and moved to Krasnoznamensk.) (R)	40	6	13	21	40	69	−29	31	Relegation to Amateur Football League
21	Monolit Moscow (R)	40	5	9	26	31	72	−41	24	Relegation to Amateur Football League
–	FC Pskov (Note: FC Pskov was excluded from the league after playing 16 games and gaining 28 points. All their results were discarded. They played their first professional season and played in the Amateur Football League next season.)	16	-	-	-	-	-	—	0	

Source: RSSSF
(A) Advance to a further round; (R) Relegated

=== Top goalscorers ===
32 goals

- Aleksei Snigiryov (FC Torpedo-ZIL Moscow)

23 goals

- Anatoli Balaluyev (FC Avtomobilist Noginsk)

18 goals

- Aleksei Kocharygin (FC Spartak-2 Moscow)
- Sergey Korovushkin (PFC CSKA-2 Moscow)

17 goals

- Maksim Grevtsev (FC Spartak Shchyolkovo)
- Sergei Lutovinov (FC Spartak-2 Moscow)

16 goals

- Maksim Aristarkhov (FC Torpedo-2 Moscow)

15 goals

- Yuri Bagdasaryan (FC Mosenergo Moscow)
- Yuriy Yakovenko (Ukraine) (FC Torpedo-ZIL Moscow)

14 goals

- Dmitri Rudanov (FC Neftyanik Yaroslavl)

== Zone Center ==
=== Overview ===
Team	Head coach
FC Spartak-Orekhovo Orekhovo-Zuyevo	Sergey Frantsev
FC Oryol	Nikolay Kiselyov
FC Spartak Ryazan	Sergei Nedosekin (until June); Sergey Mushtruyev (from June)
FC Spartak Tambov	Vladimir Kovylin
FC Lokomotiv Liski	Vladimir Ponomaryov
FC Kosmos Dolgoprudny	Aleksandr Logunov
FC Don Novomoskovsk	Igor Solovyov
FC Spartak Lukhovitsy	Aleksandr Irkhin (until May); Vladimir Golubev (June to July); Sergei Nedosekin (from July)
FC Spartak Bryansk	Valeri Korneyev
FC Torpedo Vladimir	Anatoli Solovyov
FC Fabus Bronnitsy	S. A. Tatuyev
FC Dynamo Bryansk	Viktor Zimin
FC Kolomna	Vadim Yastrebkov
FC Arsenal-2 Tula	Vladimir Babanov (until June); Vyacheslav Ledovskikh (from June)
FC Titan Reutov	Aleksei Belenkov
FC Tekstilshchik Ivanovo	Vladimir Belkov (until May); Valeri Gornushkin (from May)
FC Lokomotiv Kaluga	Aleksandr Sakharov (until August); A. E. Pavlov (August to September); Vadim Zherdev (from September)
FC Avangard Kursk	Aleksandr Galkin
FC Salyut-YuKOS Belgorod	Aleksandr Kryukov
FC Stroitel Morshansk	Vyacheslav Vlasov
FC Asmaral Moscow	Vladimir Mikhaylov (until May); V. V. Medvedev (May); Aleksandr Antonov (from May)
FC Torgmash Lyubertsy	Viktor Sobolrv (until April); Anatoli Leshchenkov (April); A. D. Bochkov (April); Anatoli Leshchenkov (May to June)

=== Standings ===
Pos	Team	Pld	W	D	L	GF	GA	GD	Pts	Promotion or relegation
1	Spartak-Orekhovo Orekhovo-Zuyevo (A)	40	25	14	1	60	23	+37	89	Promotion to First Division
2	Oryol	40	21	15	4	55	18	+37	78	
3	Spartak Ryazan	40	21	12	7	56	29	+27	75	
4	Spartak Tambov	40	20	14	6	67	38	+29	74	
5	Lokomotiv Liski	40	20	8	12	59	38	+21	68	
6	Kosmos Dolgoprudny	40	17	15	8	61	44	+17	66	
7	Don Novomoskovsk	40	18	10	12	46	40	+6	64	
8	Spartak Lukhovitsy	40	17	13	10	55	39	+16	64	
9	Spartak Bryansk	40	17	8	15	50	48	+2	59	
10	Torpedo Vladimir	40	15	10	15	37	37	0	55	
11	Fabus Bronnitsy	40	14	10	16	44	46	−2	52	
12	Dynamo Bryansk	40	14	8	18	44	57	−13	50	
13	Kolomna	40	14	8	18	57	72	−15	50	
14	Arsenal-2 Tula (Note: FC Luch Tula renamed to FC Arsenal-2.)	40	11	14	15	48	49	−1	47	
15	Titan Reutov	40	10	14	16	35	45	−10	44	
16	Tekstilshchik Ivanovo (R)	40	10	7	23	49	70	−21	37	Relegation to Amateur Football League
17	Lokomotiv Kaluga	40	8	13	19	34	62	−28	37	
18	Avangard Kursk	40	9	9	22	34	54	−20	36	
19	Salyut-YuKOS Belgorod	40	8	12	20	50	66	−16	36	
20	Stroitel Morshansk (R)	40	8	10	22	34	67	−33	34	Relegation to Amateur Football League
21	Asmaral Moscow (R)	40	9	4	27	42	75	−33	31	Relegation to Amateur Football League
–	FC Torgmash Lyubertsy (Note: FC Torgmash Lyubertsy was excluded from the league after playing 15 games and gaining 9 points. All their results were discarded. They played in the Amateur Football League in 1999.)	15	-	-	-	-	-	—	0	

Source: RSSSF
(A) Advance to a further round; (R) Relegated

=== Top goalscorers ===
24 goals

- Aleksei Medvedev (FC Spartak-Orekhovo Orekhovo-Zuyevo)

21 goals

- Anatoli Sigachyov (FC Don Novomoskovsk)

19 goals

- Andrei Boldin (FC Kolomna)

17 goals

- Sergei Gavrilov (FC Spartak Tambov)

16 goals

- Mikhail Filyunov (FC Oryol)

15 goals

- Konstantin Kaynov (FC Fabus Bronnitsy)
- Valeri Korneyev (FC Spartak Bryansk)

14 goals

- Yevgeni Kuzka (FC Spartak Ryazan)

12 goals

- Igor Grokhovskiy (Kazakhstan) (FC Arsenal-2 Tula)
- Vladimir Kharin (FC Lokomotiv Liski)
- Andrei Meshchaninov (FC Kosmos Dolgoprudny)
- Aleksandr Rogachyov (FC Spartak Lukhovitsy)

== Zone South ==
=== Overview ===
Team	Head coach
FC Volgar-Gazprom Astrakhan	Enver Yulgushov
FC Angusht Nazran	Timur Kuriyev
FC Lokomotiv-Taym Mineralnye Vody	Aleksandr Ikayev (until April); Yuri Dukhovnov (April to August); Aleksandr Babayan (from August)
FC Kavkazkabel Prokhladny	Sergei Razaryonov
FC Avtodor Vladikavkaz	Yuri Gazzaev (until May); Erik Berezov (from May)
FC Rostselmash-2 Rostov-on-Don	
FC Kuban Slavyansk-na-Kubani	Nikolai Smirnov
FC Mozdok	Ismail Yanbuktin (until May); I.P. Marushchak (May to August); Vladimir Arkalov (from August)
FC Torpedo Taganrog	Anatoly Bulgakov
FC Nart Nartkala	Vladimir Kurashinov
FC Venets Gulkevichi	Vasili Sidorenko
FC Torpedo Georgiyevsk	Aleksandr Ivanchenko
FC Anapa	Akop Kalandzhan
FC Dynamo Makhachkala	Magomed Isayev
FC Shakhtyor Shakhty	Valeri Dzolov
FC Iriston Vladikavkaz	Ruslan Merdenov
FC Nart Cherkessk	Nikolai Shvydkiy (until May); V.N. Lakhov (May); Nurbiy Lakhov (from May)
FC Zhemchuzhina-2 Sochi	Anatoli Lyz
FC Beshtau Lermontov	Valentin Lobachyov (until August); Sergei Shestakov (from August)
FC Alania-2 Vladikavkaz	Valeri Lipatov
FC Torpedo Armavir	S.S. Gorbachyov (until August); Viktor Zvyagin (from August)

=== Standings ===
Pos	Team	Pld	W	D	L	GF	GA	GD	Pts	Promotion or relegation
1	Volgar-Gazprom Astrakhan (A)	40	32	5	3	114	22	+92	101 (Note: FC Volgar-Gazprom Astrakhan, FC Dynamo Makhachkala and FC Shakhtyor Shakhty awarded 1 home win each.)	Promotion to First Division
2	Angusht Nazran	40	28	6	6	82	27	+55	90	
3	Lokomotiv-Taym Mineralnye Vody (Note: FC Lokomotiv Mineralnye Vody renamed to FC Lokomotiv-Taym. They did not participate in any national-level competitions in 1999.) (R)	40	25	6	9	75	36	+39	81	Relegation to Amateur Football League
4	Kavkazkabel Prokhladny	40	25	6	9	59	33	+26	81	
5	Avtodor Vladikavkaz	40	23	7	10	77	38	+39	76	
6	Rostselmash-2 Rostov-on-Don (Note: FC Rostselmash-d Rostov-on-Don renamed to FC Rostselmash-2.)	40	20	9	11	68	42	+26	69	
7	Kuban Slavyansk-na-Kubani	40	19	7	14	79	58	+21	64	
8	Mozdok	40	18	9	13	52	42	+10	63	
9	Torpedo Taganrog	40	16	12	12	81	57	+24	60	
10	Nart Nartkala	40	17	7	16	58	64	−6	58	
11	Venets Gulkevichi	40	16	6	18	49	62	−13	54	
12	Torpedo Georgiyevsk	40	12	14	14	43	51	−8	50	
13	Anapa (Note: FC Spartak Anapa renamed to FC Anapa. They did not participate in any national-level competitions in 1999.) (R)	40	14	6	20	61	75	−14	48	Relegation to Amateur Football League
14	Dynamo Makhachkala (Note: FC Dynamo-Imamat Makhachkala renamed to FC Dynamo.)	40	12	10	18	53	65	−12	46	
15	Shakhtyor Shakhty	40	11	13	16	44	50	−6	46	
16	Iriston Vladikavkaz	40	12	7	21	49	70	−21	43	
17	Nart Cherkessk (R)	40	10	8	22	34	60	−26	38	Relegation to Amateur Football League
18	Zhemchuzhina-2 Sochi (Note: FC Zhemchuzhina-d Sochi renamed to FC Zhemchuzhina-2.)	40	10	5	25	47	79	−32	35	
19	Beshtau Lermontov	40	9	3	28	32	99	−67	30	
20	Alania-2 Vladikavkaz (Note: FC Alania-d Vladikavkaz renamed to FC Alania-2. They did not participate in any national-level competitions in 1999.) (R)	40	7	7	26	32	83	−51	28	Relegation to Amateur Football League
21	Armavir (Note: FC Torpedo Armavir did not participate in any national-level competitions in 1999.) (R)	40	4	7	29	25	101	−76	19	Relegation to Amateur Football League

Source: RSSSF
(A) Advance to a further round; (R) Relegated

=== Top goalscorers ===
29 goals

- Yusup Guguyev (FC Angusht Nazran)

28 goals

- Aleksandr Krotov (FC Volgar-Gazprom Astrakhan)

26 goals

- Isa Markhiyev (FC Angusht Nazran)

20 goals

- Ihor Stasyuk (Ukraine) (FC Torpedo Taganrog)
- Aleksandr Tatarkin (FC Volgar-Gazprom Astrakhan)
- Stanislav Tskhovrebov (FC Avtodor Vladikavkaz)

16 goals

- Andranik Babayan (FC Volgar-Gazprom Astrakhan)
- Aleksei Burlutskiy (FC Torpedo Taganrog)

14 goals

- Grigori Ivanov (FC Volgar-Gazprom Astrakhan)
- Andrey Perederiy (FC Avtodor Vladikavkaz)

== Zone Povolzhye ==
=== Overview ===
Team	Head coach
FC Torpedo-Viktoriya Nizhny Novgorod	Leonid Nazarenko
FC Torpedo Pavlovo	Aleksandr Sarafannikov
FC Torpedo Volzhsky	Aleksandr Khomutetskiy
FC Energiya Uren	Viktor Pavlyukov
FC Torpedo Arzamas	Vladimir Inyutin
FC Diana Volzhsk	Aleksandr Tsilyurik (until August); Valeri Bogdanov (from August)
FC Svetotekhnika Saransk	Vladimir Bibikov (until September); Vladimir Yerofeyev (from September)
FC Biokhimik-Mordovia Saransk	Igor Shinkarenko
FC Zenit Penza	Aleksandr Komissarov
FC Balakovo	Viktor Papayev (until July); Aleksandr Krokhin (caretaker, July to August); Gennadi Drozdov (from August)
FC Volga Ulyanovsk	Aleksandr Korolyov
FC Spartak-Telekom Shuya	Aleksandr Saitov
FC Energiya Ulyanovsk	Mikhail Fursenko (until July); Valeri Korobkov (July to August); Vladimir Bubnov (from August)
FC Iskra Engels	Anatoli Smal
FC Khimik Dzerzhinsk	Valeri Volodin
FC Salyut Saratov	Vladimir Khoroltsev
FC Rotor-2 Volgograd	Yuri Marushkin/Vladimir Faizulin/Aleksandr Nikitin
FC Druzhba Yoshkar-Ola	Radik Gadeyev
FC Progress Zelenodolsk	Aleksandr Klobukov
FC Rotor Kamyshin	Vladimir Bubnov

=== Standings ===
Pos	Team	Pld	W	D	L	GF	GA	GD	Pts	Promotion or relegation
1	Torpedo-Viktoriya Nizhny Novgorod (A)	36	29	5	2	74	24	+50	92	Promotion to First Division
2	Torpedo Pavlovo	36	24	3	9	63	24	+39	75	
3	Torpedo Volzhsky	36	20	8	8	60	40	+20	68	
4	Energiya Uren	36	19	10	7	57	28	+29	67	
5	Torpedo Arzamas	36	17	9	10	52	37	+15	60	
6	Diana Volzhsk (Note: FC Diana Volzhsk and FC Spartak-Telekom Shuya promoted from the Amateur Football League.)	36	17	6	13	52	46	+6	57	
7	Svetotekhnika Saransk	36	16	9	11	54	36	+18	57	
8	Biokhimik-Mordovia Saransk	36	15	9	12	40	39	+1	54	
9	Zenit Penza	36	16	5	15	47	50	−3	53	
10	Balakovo (Note: FC Volga Balakovo renamed to FC Balakovo.)	36	16	4	16	48	44	+4	52	
11	Volga Ulyanovsk	36	15	7	14	36	41	−5	52	
12	Spartak-Telekom Shuya	36	14	10	12	36	35	+1	52	
13	Energiya Ulyanovsk (Note: FC Energetik Uren renamed to FC Energiya.)	36	12	10	14	39	48	−9	46	
14	Iskra Engels	36	12	8	16	40	40	0	44	
15	Khimik Dzerzhinsk	36	11	9	16	30	38	−8	42	
16	Salyut Saratov	36	9	7	20	31	49	−18	34	
17	Rotor-2 Volgograd (Note: FC Rotor-d Volgograd renamed to FC Rotor-2.)	36	8	4	24	49	72	−23	28	
18	Druzhba Yoshkar-Ola (R)	36	5	3	28	21	62	−41	18	Relegation to Amateur Football League
19	Progress Zelenodolsk (R)	36	2	4	30	19	95	−76	10 (Note: FC Progress Zelenodolsk were excluded from the league after playing 18 games and gaining 10 points (they also won against FC Rotor Kamyshin who were excluded from the league earlier). Opponents were awarded 3-0 wins in the remaining games. They did not participate in any national-level competitions in 1999.)	Relegation to Amateur Football League
–	FC Energiya Kamyshin (Note: FC Energiya Kamyshin renamed to FC Rotor. They were excluded from the league after playing 15 games and gaining 19 points. All their results were discarded. They played as FC Tekstilshchik Kamyshin in the Amateur Football League in 1999.)	15	-	-	-	-	-	—	0	

Source: RSSSF
(A) Advance to a further round; (R) Relegated

=== Top goalscorers ===
31 goals

- Andrei Bakalets (FC Torpedo-Viktoriya Nizhny Novgorod)

15 goals

- Aleksandr Fedoseyev (FC Zenit Penza)

14 goals

- Mikhail Mysin (FC Rotor-2 Volgograd)
- Aleksandr Popov (FC Iskra Engels)

13 goals

- Rafael Khayrulov (FC Energiya Ulyanovsk)
- Yuri Konovalov (FC Torpedo Volzhsky)

12 goals

- Anatoli Lychagov (FC Energiya Uren)
- Igor Mordvinov (FC Torpedo Pavlovo)
- Vitali Papadopulo (FC Torpedo Arzamas)

11 goals

- Oleg Sofonov (FC Torpedo Pavlovo)

== Zone Ural ==
=== Overview ===
Team	Head coach
FC Amkar Perm	Sergei Oborin
FC Nosta Novotroitsk	Viktor Antikhovich
FC Uralmash Yekaterinburg	Vladimir Kalashnikov (until August); Valentin Yerokhin (August); Nikolai Agafonov (from August)
FC Energiya Chaikovsky	Sergei Kleymyonov
FC UralAZ Miass	Pyotr Nagayev
FC Sodovik Sterlitamak	Sergei Maksimov
FC Zenit Chelyabinsk	Oleg Kudelin
FC Metallurg-Metiznik Magnitogorsk	Aleksandr Kukushkin
FC Dynamo Perm	Viktor Arkhapchev (until October); Andrei Boglayevskiy (from October)
FC Samotlor-XXI Nizhnevartovsk	Boris Zhuravlyov (until May); Vladimir Kovbiy (caretaker, from May)
FC Dynamo Omsk	Vyacheslav Martynov
FC Gazovik Orenburg	Valeri Bogdanov (until June); Nikolai Yelanev (June to August); Yevgeni Kasyan (August to October); Nikolai Yelanev (from October)
FC Irtysh Tobolsk	Vitali Alkhazov
FC Uralets Nizhny Tagil	Anatoli Garenskikh (until June); Lev Kutashov (from June)
FC Sibir Kurgan	Vladimir Solovadchenko
FC Neftyanik Pokhvistnevo	Dmitri Kirgeyev
FC Dynamo Izhevsk	Stanislav Korotayev
FC Trubnik Kamensk-Uralsky	Vasili Petrovich

=== Standings ===
Pos	Team	Pld	W	D	L	GF	GA	GD	Pts	Promotion or relegation
1	Amkar Perm (A)	34	31	2	1	100	12	+88	95	Promotion to First Division
2	Nosta Novotroitsk	34	29	3	2	91	11	+80	90	
3	Uralmash Yekaterinburg	34	20	6	8	63	29	+34	66	
4	Energiya Chaikovsky	34	20	3	11	70	39	+31	63	
5	UralAZ Miass	34	18	6	10	57	34	+23	60	
6	Sodovik Sterlitamak	34	16	7	11	45	37	+8	55	
7	Zenit Chelyabinsk	34	15	8	11	45	32	+13	53	
8	Metallurg-Metiznik Magnitogorsk (Note: FC Magnitka Magnitogorsk renamed to FC Metallurg-Metiznik after playing 15 games.)	34	15	7	12	55	53	+2	52	
9	Dynamo Perm	34	16	2	16	56	55	+1	50	
10	Samotlor-XXI Nizhnevartovsk	34	17	9	8	53	39	+14	48 (Note: FC Samotlor-XXI Nizhevartovsk deducted 12 points.)	
11	Dynamo Omsk	34	15	2	17	36	47	−11	47	
12	Gazovik Orenburg	34	11	3	20	46	60	−14	36	
13	Irtysh Tobolsk	34	10	6	18	31	54	−23	36	
14	Uralets Nizhny Tagil	34	9	3	22	33	64	−31	30	
15	Sibir Kurgan	34	5	14	15	28	59	−31	29	
16	Neftyanik Pokhvistnevo	34	8	4	22	24	68	−44	28	
17	Dynamo Izhevsk (Note: FC Zenit Izhevsk renamed to FC Dynamo after playing 14 games.)	34	4	3	27	28	82	−54	15	
18	Trubnik Kamensk-Uralsky (R)	34	1	4	29	6	92	−86	7 (Note: FC Trubnik Kamensk-Uralsky were excluded from the league after playing 18 games and gaining 7 points. Opponents were awarded 3-0 wins in the remaining matches. They did not participate in any national-level competitions in 1999.)	Relegation to Amateur Football League

Source: RSSSF
(A) Advance to a further round; (R) Relegated

=== Top goalscorers ===
30 goals

- Konstantin Paramonov (FC Amkar Perm)

28 goals

- Vladimir Filippov (FC Nosta Novotroitsk)

19 goals

- Andrei Ivanov (FC Energiya Chaikovsky)
- Sergei Kireyev (FC Zenit Chelyabinsk)
- Vladimir Raykov (FC UralAZ Miass)

17 goals

- Konstantin Zyryanov (FC Amkar Perm)

14 goals

- (Ukraine) Serhiy Yakovenko (FC Energiya Chaikovsky)

13 goals

- Lev Matveyev (FC Amkar Perm)
- Yawhen Tsarkov (Belarus) (FC Zenit Chelyabinsk)

12 goals

- Aleksei Alekseyev (FC Uralmash Yekaterinburg)
- Denis Malyavkin (FC Metallurg-Metiznik Magnitogorsk)
- Vladimir Pantyushenko (FC Samotlor-XXI Nizhnevartovsk)
- Sergei Sviridkin (FC Gazovik Orenburg)

== Zone East ==
=== Overview ===
Team	Head coach
FC Metallurg Krasnoyarsk	Ishtvan Sekech
FC Chkalovets Novosibirsk	Sergei Iromashvili
FC Zvezda Irkutsk	Boris Sinitsyn (until June); Sergei Muratov (June to August); Oleg Izmaylov (from August)
FC SKA Khabarovsk	Vladimir Susin
FC Metallurg Novokuznetsk	Vladislav Sosnov
FC Amur-Energiya Blagoveshchensk	Ivan Nikolayev (until August)
FC Luch Vladivostok	Andrei Fedyakin
FC Selenga Ulan-Ude	Valeri Mikhnov
FC Dynamo Barnaul	Aleksandr Gostenin
FC Zarya Leninsk-Kuznetsky	Sergei Vasyutin (until August); Vladimir Smorodikov (from August)
FC Kuzbass Kemerovo	Viktor Slesarev (until August); Sergei Vasyutin (from August)
FC Viktoriya Nazarovo	Aleksandr Kishinevsky (until August); Ivan Nikolayev (from August)
FC Okean Nakhodka	Pavel Palatin
FC Sibiryak Bratsk	Valeri Tolchev
FC Mezhdurechensk	Aleksandr Rakov
FC Torpedo Rubtsovsk	Nikolai Kopylov

=== Standings ===
Pos	Team	Pld	W	D	L	GF	GA	GD	Pts	Promotion or relegation
1	Metallurg Krasnoyarsk (A)	30	19	6	5	53	14	+39	63	Promotion to First Division
2	Chkalovets Novosibirsk	30	16	12	2	41	17	+24	60	
3	Zvezda Irkutsk	30	16	8	6	43	13	+30	56	
4	SKA Khabarovsk	30	17	4	9	49	32	+17	55	
5	Metallurg Novokuznetsk (Note: FC Metallurg-ZapSib Novokuznetsk renamed to FC Metallurg.)	30	15	6	9	44	32	+12	51	
6	Amur-Energiya Blagoveshchensk	30	13	10	7	37	24	+13	49	
7	Luch Vladivostok	30	14	6	10	42	24	+18	48	
8	Selenga Ulan-Ude	30	11	9	10	35	45	−10	42	
9	Dynamo Barnaul	30	11	6	13	37	34	+3	39	
10	Zarya Leninsk-Kuznetsky	30	8	10	12	27	33	−6	34	
11	Kuzbass Kemerovo	30	10	9	11	32	37	−5	33 (Note: FC Kuzbass Kemerovo deducted 6 points.)	
12	Viktoriya Nazarovo (Note: FC Viktoriya Nazarovo and FC Mezhdurechensk did not participate in any national-level competitions in 1999.) (R)	30	8	9	13	30	41	−11	33	Relegation to Amateur Football League
13	Okean Nakhodka	30	6	11	13	24	45	−21	29	
14	Sibiryak Bratsk (Note: FC Sibiryak Bratsk promoted from the Amateur Football League.)	30	6	7	17	26	47	−21	25	
15	Mezhdurechensk (R)	30	3	9	18	18	55	−37	18	Relegation to Amateur Football League
16	Torpedo Rubtsovsk (R)	30	2	8	20	19	64	−45	14	Relegation to Amateur Football League

Source: RSSSF
(A) Advance to a further round; (R) Relegated

=== Top goalscorers ===
13 goals

- Sergei Bogdanov (FC Metallurg Krasnoyarsk)
- Igor Zykov (FC Selenga Ulan-Ude)

10 goals

- Stanislav Chaplygin (FC Metallurg Novokuznetsk)
- Anatoli Panchenko (FC Dynamo Barnaul)
- Vladimir Shipovskiy (FC Metallurg Novokuznetsk)

9 goals

- Viktor Kuchin (FC Metallurg Novokuznetsk)
- Oleg Nikulin (FC Chkalovets Novosibirsk)
- Oleg Yakovlev (FC Zvezda Irkutsk)

8 goals

- Vadim Belokhonov (FC Metallurg Krasnoyarsk)
- Pavel Bondarenko (FC SKA Khabarovsk)
- Vyacheslav Kholosha (FC Zvezda Irkutsk)
- Roman Melnik (FC Luch Vladivostok)
- Aleksei Tikhonkikh (FC Selenga Ulan-Ude)
- Igor Yefremov (FC Amur-Energiya Blagoveshchensk)

== See also ==
- 1998 Russian Top Division
- 1998 Russian First Division
