= 1999 Russian Second Division =

Russian Second Division
- Season: 1999

The 1999 Russian Second Division was the eighth edition of the Russian Second Division. There were 6 zones with 108 teams starting the competition (1 was excluded before the end of the season).

== Zone West ==
=== Overview ===
Team	Head coach
FC Avtomobilist Noginsk	Igor Volchok
FC Spartak Shchyolkovo	Vladimir Yulygin
FC Saturn-d Ramenskoye	Viktor Nozdrin
FC Sportakademklub Moscow	Sergei Abramov
FC Zenit-2 St. Petersburg	Lev Burchalkin
FC Mosenergo Moscow	Valentin Sysoyev
FC Volochanin Vyshny Volochyok	Viktor Demidov
FC Dynamo-2 Moscow	Viktor Zernov/Leonid Ablizin
FC Spartak-2 Moscow	Nikolay Kiselyov
FC Dynamo Vologda	Leon Yagubyants
FC Neftyanik Yaroslavl	Valentin Volkov
FC Oazis Yartsevo	Vladimir Grigoryev (until July); Leonid Arkhipov (from July)
FC Dynamo-SPb St. Petersburg	Boris Rappoport
FC Lokomotiv-2 Moscow	Andrei Syomin
PFC CSKA-2 Moscow	
FC Energiya Velikiye Luki	Vladimir Kosogov
FC Torpedo-2 Moscow	Sergei Petrenko
FC Spartak Kostroma	Aleksandr Bogdanov (until June); Aleksei Yarovoy (June to August); Yu. Mukhortov (from September)
FC Volga Tver	Vladimir Seleznyov
FC Spartak-Peresvet Bryansk	Vyacheslav Perfilyev

=== Standings ===
Pos	Team	Pld	W	D	L	GF	GA	GD	Pts	Qualification or relegation
1	Avtomobilist Noginsk (A)	38	28	5	5	83	31	+52	89	Qualification to Promotion play-offs
2	Spartak Shchyolkovo	38	19	12	7	66	35	+31	69 (Note: FC Spartak Shchyolkovo were awarded a 3-0 victory in an away game vs. FC Torpedo-2. Torpedo-2 had multiple injuries and junior national team call ups before the game and started the game with only 8 players. As two more players were injured and Torpedo-2 was left with 6 players on the field, the game was abandoned with the score 2-0 for Spartak at that time.)	
3	Saturn-d Ramenskoye (Note: FC Saturn-d Ramenskoye was admitted into the division without participating in any national-level competitions in 1998.)	38	19	11	8	49	32	+17	68	
4	Sportakademklub Moscow	38	18	9	11	56	50	+6	63	
5	Zenit-2 St. Petersburg	38	18	8	12	56	37	+19	62	
6	Mosenergo Moscow	38	18	8	12	52	44	+8	62	
7	Volochanin Vyshny Volochyok	38	17	10	11	46	35	+11	61	
8	Dynamo-2 Moscow	38	17	8	13	56	38	+18	59	
9	Spartak-2 Moscow	38	15	11	12	48	34	+14	56	
10	Dynamo Vologda	38	15	11	12	45	38	+7	56	
11	Neftyanik Yaroslavl	38	13	12	13	35	30	+5	51	
12	Oazis Yartsevo (Note: FC Oazis Yartsevo promoted from the Russian Amateur Football League.)	38	11	18	9	40	32	+8	51	
13	Dynamo-SPb St. Petersburg (Note: FC Dynamo St. Petersburg renamed to FC Dynamo-SPb. They did not participate in any national-level competitions in 2000.) (R)	38	11	12	15	31	39	−8	45 (Note: FC Spartak-Peresvet were awarded a 3-0 victory over FC Dynamo-SPb as Dynamo-SPb did not arrive for the game.)	Relegation to Amateur Football League
14	Lokomotiv-2 Moscow	38	11	12	15	39	52	−13	45	
15	CSKA-2 Moscow	38	10	10	18	38	45	−7	40	
16	Energiya Velikiye Luki	38	10	8	20	31	66	−35	38 (Note: FC Torpedo-2 were awarded a 3-0 victory over FC Energiya as Energiya did not arrive for the game.)	
17	Torpedo-2 Moscow	38	9	10	19	36	55	−19	37	
18	Spartak Kostroma	38	8	9	21	35	75	−40	33	
19	Volga Tver (R)	38	7	8	23	27	56	−29	29	Relegation to Amateur Football League
20	Spartak-Peresvet Bryansk (Note: FC Spartak Bryansk renamed to FC Spartak-Peresvet. They did not participate in any national-level competitions in 2000.) (R)	38	6	8	24	36	81	−45	26	Relegation to Amateur Football League

Source: RSSSF
(A) Advance to a further round; (R) Relegated

=== Top goalscorers ===
22 goals

- Anatoli Balaluyev (FC Avtomobilist Noginsk)

20 goals

- Aleksandr Rogulin (FC Oazis Yartsevo)

19 goals

- (Armenia) Andrey Movsisyan (FC Sportakademklub Moscow)
- Andrei Shershen (FC Mosenergo Moscow)

15 goals

- Igor Tikhonov (FC Avtomobilist Noginsk)

14 goals

- Dmitri Batynkov (FC Avtomobilist Noginsk)
- Sergei Domrachyov (FC Volochanin-89 Vyshny Volochyok)

13 goals

- Dmitri Akimov (FC Zenit-2 St. Petersburg)

12 goals

- Maksim Grevtsev (FC Spartak Shchyolkovo)
- Sergei Kondratyev (FC Avtomobilist Noginsk)
- Dmitri Podshivalov (FC Dynamo-2 Moscow)

== Zone Centre ==
=== Overview ===
Team	Head coach
FC Spartak-Chukotka Moscow	Anatoli Shelest
FC Kolomna	Vadim Yastrebkov (until June), Fyodor Novikov (from June)
FC Kosmos Elektrostal	Aleksandr Logunov
FC Oryol	Vitali Koberskiy
FC Dynamo Bryansk	Igor Belonovich
FC Khimki	Ravil Sabitov (until August), Vadim Kots (caretaker, August), Ravil Sabitov (from September)
FC Spartak Tambov	Vladimir Kovylin
FC Lokomotiv Liski	Vladimir Ponomaryov (until August), Anatoli Vlasov (from August)
FC Fabus Bronnitsy	Aleksandr Antonov
FC Spartak Ryazan	Sergey Mushtruyev
FC Spartak-Telekom Shuya	Aleksandr Saitov
FC Lokomotiv Kaluga	Aleksandr Sakharov
FC Don Novomoskovsk	Igor Solovyov
FC Spartak Lukhovitsy	Sergei Malygin
FC Avangard Kursk	Aleksandr Galkin
FC Arsenal-2 Tula	Vyacheslav Ledovskikh
FC Titan Zheleznodorozhny	Dmitri Khazin (until July), Nikolai Pushkaryov (from July)
FC Torpedo Vladimir	Yuri Pyanov
FC Salyut-YuKOS Belgorod	Konstantin Afanasyev (until May), Vladimir Bulgakov (May to July), Vasili Golikov (from July)

=== Standings ===
Pos	Team	Pld	W	D	L	GF	GA	GD	Pts	Qualification or relegation
1	Spartak-Chukotka Moscow (Note: FC Spartak-Chukotka Moscow promoted from the Amateur Football League.) (A)	36	25	8	3	70	28	+42	83	Qualification to Promotion play-offs
2	Kolomna	36	22	6	8	68	44	+24	72	
3	Kosmos Elektrostal (Note: FC Kosmos Dolgoprudny moved to Elektrostal.)	36	22	5	9	63	25	+38	71	
4	Oryol	36	20	7	9	53	27	+26	67	
5	Dynamo Bryansk	36	18	9	9	51	24	+27	63	
6	Khimki (Note: FC Khimki moved from Zone West to Zone Centre.)	36	17	11	8	51	35	+16	62	
7	Spartak Tambov	36	18	5	13	56	42	+14	59	
8	Lokomotiv Liski	36	16	8	12	54	40	+14	56	
9	Fabus Bronnitsy	36	16	7	13	41	38	+3	55	
10	Spartak Ryazan	36	15	5	16	46	46	0	50	
11	Spartak-Telekom Shuya (Note: FC Spartak-Telekom Shuya moved from Zone Povolzhye to Zone Centre.)	36	13	9	14	32	35	−3	48	
12	Lokomotiv Kaluga	36	12	9	15	40	48	−8	45	
13	Don Novomoskovsk	36	12	6	18	31	44	−13	42	
14	Spartak Lukhovitsy	36	11	5	20	42	65	−23	38	
15	Avangard Kursk	36	10	7	19	40	59	−19	37	
16	Arsenal-2 Tula	36	9	6	21	31	56	−25	33	
17	Titan Zheleznodorozhny (Note: FC Titan Reutov moved to Zheleznodorozhny.)	36	6	11	19	32	69	−37	29	
18	Torpedo Vladimir (R)	36	6	7	23	35	64	−29	25	Relegation to Amateur Football League
19	Salyut-YuKOS Belgorod (R)	36	4	9	23	27	74	−47	21	Relegation to Amateur Football League

Source: RSSSF
(A) Advance to a further round; (R) Relegated

=== Top goalscorers ===
26 goals

- Aleksandr Katasonov (FC Spartak-Chukotka Moscow)
- Vladimir Kharin (FC Lokomotiv Liski)

23 goals

- Sergei Lutovinov (FC Spartak-Chukotka Moscow)

21 goals

- Maksim Olkhovik (FC Spartak Lukhovitsy)

20 goals

- Sergei Pervushin (FC Spartak Tambov)

18 goals

- Andrei Boldin (FC Kolomna)
- Ruslan Nezamendinov (FC Kosmos Elektrostal)

15 goals

- Yevgeni Losev (FC Lokomotiv Kaluga)

14 goals

- Yevgeni Kuzka (FC Spartak Ryazan)

13 goals

- Andrei Meshchaninov (FC Kosmos Elektrostal)

== Zone South ==
=== Overview ===
Team	Head coach
FC Kuban Krasnodar	Soferbi Yeshugov
FC SKA Rostov-on-Don	Aleksandr Tumasyan
FC Kavkazkabel Prokhladny	Sergei Razaryonov
FC Avtodor Vladikavkaz	Yuri Gazzaev
FC Druzhba Maykop	Adam Natkho
FC Angusht Nazran	Timur Kuriyev (until July); Umar Markhiyev (from August)
FC Vityaz Krymsk	Kalin Stepanyan
FC Lokomotiv-Taym Mineralnye Vody	Aleksandr Ikayev (until April); Yuri Dukhovnov (April to August); Aleksandr Babayan (from August)
FC Rostselmash-2 Rostov-on-Don	
FC Dynamo Makhachkala	Magomed Isayev
FC Mozdok	Vladimir Arkalov
FC Slavyansk Slavyansk-na-Kubani	Vladimir Sinyagovsky
FC Shakhtyor Shakhty	Valeri Dzolov
FC Zhemchuzhina-2 Sochi	Anatoli Lyz
FC Venets Gulkevichi	Vasili Sidorenko
FC Nart Nartkala	Vladimir Kurashinov
FC Iriston Vladikavkaz	Ruslan Merdenov
FC Torpedo Taganrog	Anatoli Shabanov
FC Beshtau Lermontov	Sergei Shestakov, Viktor Vashchenko
FC Torpedo Georgiyevsk	Aleksandr Ivanchenko

=== Standings ===
Pos	Team	Pld	W	D	L	GF	GA	GD	Pts	Qualification or relegation
1	Kuban Krasnodar (A)	36	29	4	3	80	13	+67	91	Qualification to Promotion play-offs
2	SKA Rostov-on-Don (Note: FC SKA Rostov-on-Don and FC Vityaz Krymsk promoted from the Amateur Football League)	36	25	7	4	71	28	+43	82	
3	Kavkazkabel Prokhladny	36	24	7	5	67	32	+35	79	
4	Avtodor Vladikavkaz	36	25	3	8	74	27	+47	78	
5	Druzhba Maykop	36	20	11	5	80	27	+53	71	
6	Angusht Nazran	36	20	6	10	69	39	+30	66	
7	Vityaz Krymsk	36	18	9	9	60	52	+8	63	
8	Rostselmash-2 Rostov-on-Don	36	17	8	11	62	32	+30	59	
9	Dynamo Makhachkala	36	15	5	16	42	45	−3	50	
10	Mozdok	36	13	8	15	47	45	+2	47	
11	Slavyansk Slavyansk-na-Kubani (Note: FC Kuban Slavynsk-na-Kubani renamed to FC Slavyansk.)	36	11	11	14	38	47	−9	44	
12	Shakhtyor Shakhty	36	12	7	17	36	52	−16	43	
13	Zhemchuzhina-2 Sochi (R)	36	12	5	19	44	61	−17	41	Relegation to Amateur Football League (Note: FC Zhemchuzhina-2 Sochi, FC Beshtau Lermontov and FC Torpedo Georgiyevsk did not participate in any national-level competitions in 2000.)
14	Venets Gulkevichi	36	11	4	21	40	77	−37	37	
15	Nart Nartkala	36	10	7	19	52	65	−13	37	
16	Iriston Vladikavkaz	36	7	6	23	39	79	−40	27	
17	Torpedo Taganrog	36	5	4	27	24	74	−50	19	
18	Beshtau Lermontov (R)	36	3	8	25	32	80	−48	17	Relegation to Amateur Football League
19	Torpedo Georgiyevsk (R)	36	2	6	28	19	101	−82	12	Relegation to Amateur Football League

Source: RSSSF
(A) Advance to a further round; (R) Relegated

=== Top goalscorers ===
34 goals

- Isa Markhiyev (FC Angusht Nazran)

20 goals

- Stanislav Lebedintsev (FC SKA Rostov-on-Don)
- Andrey Perederiy (FC Avtodor Vladikavkaz)

19 goals

- Ruslan Kunikhov (FC Druzhba Maykop)

18 goals

- (Georgia (country)) Iuri Gabiskiria (FC Kuban Krasnodar)
- Sergey Maslov (FC Rostselmash-2 Rostov-on-Don)

14 goals

- Soslan Torchinov (FC Avtodor Vladikavkaz)

13 goals

- Vitali Makarenko (FC Kavkazkabel Prokhladny)
- Aleksei Surinov (FC Zhemchuzhina-2 Sochi)

12 goals

- Ladin Apshev (FC Kavkazkabel Prokhladny)
- Spartak Gogniyev (FC Avtodor Vladikavkaz)
- Viktor Korban (FC SKA Rostov-on-Don)

== Zone Povolzhye ==
=== Overview ===
Team	Head coach
FC Lada Togliatti	Aleksandr Garmashov
FC Torpedo Pavlovo	Aleksandr Sarafannikov
FC Volga Ulyanovsk	Sergei Sedyshev
FC Energetik Uren	Viktor Pavlyukov
FC Iskra Engels	Dmitri Lobov
FC Diana Volzhsk	Valeri Bogdanov
FC Metallurg Vyksa	Yevgeni Popov
FC Biokhimik-Mordovia Saransk	Igor Shinkarenko
FC Khimik Dzerzhinsk	Valeri Volodin
FC Energiya Ulyanovsk	Yevgeni Yepifanov, Andrei Flaat
FC Balakovo	Gennadi Drozdov, Aleksandr Koreshkov, Vladimir Bibikov
FC Svetotekhnika Saransk	Aleksei Bessonov (until July); Valeri Guba (from July)
FC Torpedo Volzhsky	Aleksandr Khomutetskiy, Oleg Dudarin, Anatoli Kurbatov
FC Salyut Saratov	Vladimir Khoroltsev
FC Rotor-2 Volgograd	Yuri Marushkin
FC Dynamo-Mashinostroitel Kirov	Vasili Esaulov
FC Zenit Penza	
FC Torpedo Arzamas	Aleksandr Platonychev, Yuri Kamardin
FC Spartak-Telekom Shuya	Aleksandr Saitov
FC Druzhba Yoshkar-Ola	Radik Gadeyev
FC Progress Zelenodolsk	Aleksandr Klobukov
FC Rotor Kamyshin	Vladimir Bubnov

=== Standings ===
Pos	Team	Pld	W	D	L	GF	GA	GD	Pts	Qualification or relegation
1	Lada-Togliatti (Note: FC Lada-Togliatti-VAZ Togliatti renamed to FC Lada.) (A)	34	27	4	3	89	22	+67	85	Qualification to Promotion play-offs
2	Torpedo Pavlovo	34	22	5	7	66	22	+44	71	
3	Volga Ulyanovsk	34	19	6	9	49	33	+16	63	
4	Energetik Uren	34	19	4	11	49	36	+13	61	
5	Iskra Engels	34	16	7	11	42	37	+5	55	
6	Diana Volzhsk	34	15	9	10	46	33	+13	54	
7	Metallurg Vyksa (Note: FC Metallurg Vyksa promoted from the Amateur Football League.)	34	16	5	13	45	35	+10	53	
8	Biokhimik-Mordovia Saransk	34	12	13	9	30	28	+2	49	
9	Khimik Dzerzhinsk	34	13	8	13	39	44	−5	47	
10	Energiya Ulyanovsk (Note: FC Energiya Ulyanovsk and FC Torpedo Arzamas did not participate in any national-level competitions in 2000.) (R)	34	14	3	17	30	46	−16	45	Relegation to Amateur Football League
11	Balakovo	34	12	8	14	47	44	+3	44	
12	Svetotekhnika Saransk	34	11	7	16	34	52	−18	40	
13	Torpedo Volzhsky	34	11	4	19	35	56	−21	37	
14	Salyut Saratov	34	9	8	17	27	42	−15	35	
15	Rotor-2 Volgograd	34	9	6	19	37	63	−26	33	
16	Dynamo-Mashinostroitel Kirov (Note: FC Dynamo-Mashinostroitel Kirov was admitted into the division without participating in any national-level competitions in 1998. They were called FC Dynamo Kirov in 1998.)	34	8	8	18	45	58	−13	32	
17	Zenit Penza (R)	34	9	3	22	33	67	−34	30	Relegation to Amateur Football League
18	Torpedo Arzamas (R)	34	8	4	22	32	57	−25	28	Relegation to Amateur Football League

Source: RSSSF
(A) Advance to a further round; (R) Relegated

=== Top goalscorers ===
27 goals

- Aleksei Vereshchak (FC Lada Togliatti)

25 goals

- Igor Mordvinov (FC Torpedo Pavlovo)

18 goals

- Dmitri Timofeyev (FC Diana Volzhsk)

17 goals

- Dmitri Golubev (FC Metallurg Vyksa)
- Vladimir Pronin (FC Volga Ulyanovsk)

14 goals

- Maksim Bondarenko (FC Rotor-2 Volgograd)
- Vitali Ivanov (FC Balakovo)
- Sergei Ulanov (FC Torpedo Arzamas)

13 goals

- Rustyam Fakhrutdinov (FC Lada Togliatti)
- Aleksandr Fedoseyev (FC Zenit Penza)
- Sergei Panov (FC Balakovo)

== Zone Ural ==
=== Overview ===
Team	Head coach
FC Nosta Novotroitsk	Leonid Shevchenko (until July); Boris Lavrov (from July)
FC Neftekhimik Nizhnekamsk	Ivan Butaliy
FC Zenit Chelyabinsk	Oleg Kudelin
FC Sodovik Sterlitamak	Sergei Maksimov
FC UralAZ Miass	Pyotr Nagayev
FC Metallurg-Metiznik Magnitogorsk	Aleksandr Kukushkin
FC Uralmash Yekaterinburg	Nikolai Agafonov
FC Uralets Nizhny Tagil	Lev Kutashov
FC Dynamo Perm	Andrei Boglayevskiy
FC KAMAZ-Chally Naberezhnye Chelny	Valeri Chetverik
FC Gazovik Orenburg	Aleksandr Korolyov
FC Dynamo Izhevsk	Stanislav Korotayev, Nikolai Vyutnov
FC Energiya Chaikovsky	Sergei Kleymyonov
FC Irtysh Tobolsk	Vitali Alkhazov, Vladimir Sizontov
FC Kurgan	
FC Neftyanik Pokhvistnevo	Georgi Verbovskiy

=== Standings ===
Pos	Team	Pld	W	D	L	GF	GA	GD	Pts	Qualification or relegation
1	Nosta Novotroitsk (A)	30	21	7	2	84	18	+66	70	Qualification to Promotion play-offs
2	Neftekhimik Nizhnekamsk	30	19	9	2	55	19	+36	66	
3	Zenit Chelyabinsk	30	16	9	5	46	28	+18	57	
4	Sodovik Sterlitamak	30	14	10	6	45	25	+20	52	
5	UralAZ Miass	30	15	6	9	50	37	+13	51	
6	Metallurg-Metiznik Magnitogorsk	30	14	8	8	44	37	+7	50	
7	Uralmash Yekaterinburg	30	14	7	9	49	30	+19	49	
8	Uralets Nizhny Tagil	30	13	9	8	36	24	+12	48	
9	Dynamo Perm	30	14	2	14	56	52	+4	44	
10	KAMAZ-Chally Naberezhnye Chelny	30	11	7	12	41	46	−5	40	
11	Gazovik Orenburg	30	10	6	14	34	37	−3	36	
12	Dynamo Izhevsk	30	8	5	17	36	52	−16	29	
13	Energiya Chaikovsky	30	7	5	18	28	53	−25	26	
14	Irtysh Tobolsk (Note: FC Irtysh Tobolsk did not participate in any national-level competitions in 2000.) (R)	30	6	6	18	19	45	−26	24	Relegation to Amateur Football League
15	Kurgan (Note: FC Sibir Kurgan renamed to FC Kurgan.)	30	3	4	23	19	78	−59	13	
16	Neftyanik Pokhvistnevo (Note: FC Neftyanik Pokhvistnevo were excluded from the league after playing 15 games and gaining 13 points. Opponents were awarded 3-0 wins in the remaining matches. Neftyanik did not participate in any national-level competitions in 2000.) (R)	34	8	4	22	24	68	−44	28	Relegation to Amateur Football League

Source: RSSSF
(A) Advance to a further round; (R) Relegated

=== Top goalscorers ===
19 goals

- Mikhail Tyufyakov (FC Dynamo Perm)

15 goals

- Vladimir Filippov (FC Nosta Novotroitsk)
- Vladimir Raykov (FC Zenit Chelyabinsk)

14 goals

- Vitali Kakunin (FC UralAZ Miass)

12 goals

- Stanislav Filonov (FC Metallurg-Metiznik Magnitogorsk)
- Arnold Slabodich (FC Neftekhimik Nizhnekamsk)

11 goals

- Sergei Budylin (FC Neftekhimik Nizhnekamsk)
- Konstantin Nizovtsev (FC Dynamo Perm)
- Albert Tsarayev (FC KamAZ-Chally Naberezhnye Chelny)
- (Uzbekistan) Ruslan Uzakov (FC Nosta Novotroitsk)

== Zone East ==
=== Overview ===
Team	Head coach
FC Metallurg Novokuznetsk	Vladislav Sosnov
FC SKA-Energiya Khabarovsk	(Ukraine) Oleh Smolyaninov
FC Amur-Energiya Blagoveshchensk	Vyacheslav Kurtsayev
FC Sibiryak Bratsk	Valeri Tolchev
FC Chkalovets Novosibirsk	Sergei Iromashvili
FC Kuzbass Kemerovo	Sergei Vasyutin
FC Luch Vladivostok	Andrei Fedyakin
FC Zvezda Irkutsk	Sergei Muratov, Anatoly Bulgakov, Gennadi Vyazovtsev
FC Dynamo Barnaul	Viktor Volynkin, Vladimir Vorzhev
FC Irtysh Omsk	Artyom Amirdzhanov
FC Reformatsiya Abakan	Aleksandr Kishinevsky
FC Okean Nakhodka	Pavel Palatin (until July); Vladimir Susin (from July)
FC Zarya Leninsk-Kuznetsky	
FC Dynamo Omsk	Vyacheslav Martynov
FC Selenga Ulan-Ude	Valeri Mikhnov
FC Samotlor-XXI Nizhnevartovsk	Vladimir Kovbiy, Vyacheslav Mogilny, Aleksandr Kucherenko, Sergei Goncharov

=== Standings ===
Pos	Team	Pld	W	D	L	GF	GA	GD	Pts	Qualification or relegation
1	Metallurg Novokuznetsk (A)	30	20	5	5	63	28	+35	65	Qualification to Promotion play-offs
2	SKA-Khabarovsk (Note: FC SKA Khabarovsk renamed to FC SKA-Energiya.)	30	20	4	6	46	17	+29	64	
3	Amur-Energiya Blagoveshchensk	30	18	6	6	53	25	+28	60	
4	Sibiryak Bratsk	30	18	3	9	48	31	+17	57	
5	Chkalovets Novosibirsk (R)	30	16	6	8	60	42	+18	54	Relegation to Amateur Football League
6	Kuzbass Kemerovo	30	16	4	10	34	24	+10	52	
7	Luch Vladivostok	30	14	7	9	43	32	+11	49	
8	Zvezda Irkutsk	30	13	7	10	37	31	+6	46	
9	Dynamo Barnaul	30	13	6	11	40	34	+6	45	
10	Irtysh Omsk	30	12	6	12	30	34	−4	42	
11	Reformatsiya Abakan (Note: FC Reformatsiya Abakan promoted from the Amateur Football League.)	30	10	7	13	38	45	−7	37	
12	Okean Nakhodka	30	7	3	20	18	38	−20	24	
13	Zarya Leninsk-Kuznetsky (R)	30	6	6	18	20	40	−20	24	Relegation to Amateur Football League
14	Dynamo Omsk (Note: FC Dynamo Omsk and FC Samotlor-XXI Nizhnevartovsk moved from Zone Ural to Zone East.)	30	5	6	19	22	56	−34	21	
15	Selenga Ulan-Ude	30	4	4	22	17	57	−40	16	
16	Samotlor-XXI Nizhnevartovsk (R)	30	4	8	18	19	54	−35	8 (Note: FC Samotlor-XXI Nizhnevartovsk were deducted 12 points for not paying transfer fees on time. They did not participate in any national-level competitions in 2000.)	Relegation to Amateur Football League

Source: RSSSF
(A) Advance to a further round; (R) Relegated

=== Top goalscorers ===
23 goals

- Stanislav Chaplygin (FC Metallurg Novokuznetsk)

17 goals

- Oleg Lidrik (FC Chkalovets Novosibirsk)

13 goals

- Yuri Shpiryuk (FC Chkalovets Novosibirsk)

12 goals

- Rezo Dzhikiya (FC Zvezda Irkutsk)
- Andrei Ponomaryov (FC Sibiryak Bratsk)
- Sergei Rogalevsky (FC Kuzbass Kemerovo)

11 goals

- Andrei Korovin (FC Amur-Energiya Blagoveshchensk)
- Roman Melnik (FC Luch Vladivostok)
- Vladislav Yarkin (FC Dynamo Barnaul / FC Metallurg Novokuznetsk)

10 goals

- Aleksei Poddubskiy (FC SKA-Energiya Khabarovsk)
- (Ukraine) Ihor Yefremov (FC Amur-Energiya Blagoveshchensk)
- Dmitri Zlobin (FC Chkalovets Novosibirsk)

== Promotion play-offs ==
25 October 1999

Nosta Novotroitsk	3–1	Metallurg Novokuznetsk
Sinelobov 28' (pen.); Gayevoy 59'; Uzakov 89'	Report	Gilagayev 72'

Metallurg Stadium, Novotroitsk
Attendance: 10,000
Referee: Taras Bezubyak (St. Petersburg)
30 October 1999

Metallurg Novokuznetsk	2–1	Nosta Novotroitsk
Yarkin 80' (pen.), 89'	Report	Belov 13'

Metallurg Stadium, Novokuznetsk
Attendance: 8,000
Referee: Nikolai Levnikov (St. Petersburg)

Nosta won 4–3 on aggregate and was promoted to the 2000 Russian First Division.

29 October 1999

Spartak-Chukotka Moscow	1–1	Avtomobilist Noginsk
Kozlov 88' (pen.)	Report	Bychkov 26'

Spartak Igor Netto Stadium, Moscow
Attendance: 2,000
Referee: Yuri Chebotaryov (Krasnodar)
3 November 1999

Avtomobilist Noginsk	1–4	Spartak-Chukotka Moscow
Sotnikov 81'	Report	Fedin 16'; Katasonov 25'; Kondratyev 58' (o.g.); Pavlenko 78'

Avtomobilist Stadium, Noginsk
Attendance: 5,000
Referee: Sergey Lapochkin (St. Petersburg)

Spartak-Chukotka won 5–2 on aggregate and was promoted to the 2000 Russian First Division.

31 October 1999

Lada Togliatti	2–1	Kuban Krasnodar
Yemelyanov 42'; Tatarkin 51'	Report	Gusev 79'

Torpedo Stadium, Tolyatti
Attendance: 8,000
Referee: Gennadi Kulichenkov (Tula)
6 November 1999

Kuban Krasnodar	1–1	Lada Togliatti
Andreyev 75'	Report	Tatarkin 9'

Kuban Stadium, Krasnodar
Attendance: 18,000
Referee: Nikolai Ivanov (St. Petersburg)

Lada Togliatti won 3–2 on aggregate and was promoted to the 2000 Russian First Division.

== See also ==
- 1999 Russian Top Division
- 1999 Russian First Division
