= FC Volga-Energiya Ulyanovsk =

FC Volga-Energiya Ulyanovsk was the name of two related but distinct Russian football clubs:

- FC Volga Ulyanovsk played under that name in the Amateur Football League in 2006
- FC Volga-d Ulyanovsk played under that name in the Amateur Football League in 2007
