= 1999 in Russian football =

1999 season

1999 in Russian football was marked by the national team's failure to qualify for the Euro 2000. Spartak Moscow won the league title, while Zenit were the victors of the Russian Cup.

== National team ==
Russia national football team failed to qualify for the Euro 2000. After a run of six straight wins, a draw with Ukraine left Russia in the third position in the group.

Date	Venue	Opponents	Score^{1}	Competition	Russia scorers	Match report
27 March 1999	Hrazdan Stadium, Yerevan (A)	Armenia	3–0	ECQ	Valery Karpin (2), Vladimir Beschastnykh	uefa
31 March 1999	Lokomotiv Stadium, Moscow (H)	Andorra	6–1	ECQ	Egor Titov, Vladimir Beschastnykh (2), Viktor Onopko, Ilya Tsymbalar, Dmitry Alenichev	uefa
19 May 1999	Arsenal Stadium, Tula (H)	Belarus	1–1	F	Alexander Mostovoi	Sport-Express
5 June 1999	Stade de France, Saint-Denis (A)	France	3–2	ECQ	Aleksandr Panov (2), Valery Karpin	uefa
9 June 1999	Dynamo Stadium, Moscow (H)	Iceland	1–0	ECQ	Valery Karpin	uefa
18 August 1999	Dinamo Stadium, Minsk (A)	Belarus	2–0	F	Vladimir Beschastnykh, Aleksandr Panov	Sport-Express
4 September 1999	Luzhniki Stadium, Moscow (H)	Armenia	2–0	ECQ	Vladimir Beschastnykh, Valery Karpin	uefa
8 September 1999	Estadi Communal, Andorra la Vella (A)	Andorra	2–1	ECQ	Viktor Onopko (2)	uefa
9 October 1999	Luzhniki Stadium, Moscow (H)	Ukraine	1–1	ECQ	Valery Karpin	uefa

1. Russia score given first

Key

- H = Home match
- A = Away match
- F = Friendly
- ECQ = 2000 UEFA European Football Championship qualifying, Group 4

== Leagues ==
=== Top Division ===
Pos	Team	Pld	W	D	L	GF	GA	GD	Pts	Qualification or relegation
1	Spartak Moscow (C)	30	22	6	2	75	24	+51	72	Qualification to Champions League group stage
2	Lokomotiv Moscow	30	20	5	5	62	30	+32	65	Qualification to Champions League third qualifying round
3	CSKA Moscow	30	15	10	5	56	29	+27	55	Qualification to UEFA Cup first round
4	Torpedo Moscow	30	13	11	6	38	33	+5	50	Qualification to UEFA Cup first round
5	Dynamo Moscow	30	12	8	10	44	41	+3	44	Qualification to UEFA Cup first round
6	Alania Vladikavkaz (Note: Alania qualified for the UEFA Cup thanks to Lokomotiv winning the Russian Cup in 2000.)	30	12	7	11	54	45	+9	43	Qualification to UEFA Cup first round
7	Rostselmash	30	11	8	11	32	37	−5	41	Qualification to Intertoto Cup third round
8	Zenit St. Petersburg	30	9	12	9	36	34	+2	39	Qualification to Intertoto Cup second round
9	Uralan Elista	30	10	6	14	27	34	−7	36	
10	Saturn	30	8	10	12	30	38	−8	34	
11	Lokomotiv N.N.	30	9	6	15	33	48	−15	33	
12	Krylia Sovetov Samara	30	8	7	15	39	49	−10	31	
13	Rotor Volgograd	30	7	10	13	36	51	−15	31	
14	Chernomorets Novorossiysk	30	7	8	15	30	49	−19	29	
15	Zhemchuzhina Sochi (R)	30	5	11	14	29	55	−26	26	Relegation to First Division
16	Shinnik Yaroslavl (R)	30	5	9	16	21	45	−24	24	Relegation to First Division

Source: rsssf.com
Rules for classification: 1) points; 2) goal difference; 3) number of goals scored.
(C) Champions; (R) Relegated

=== First Division ===
Anzhi won the First Division, winning their first promotion to the Top Division. Runners-up Fakel made their return to the top flight.

Pos	Team	Pld	W	D	L	GF	GA	GD	Pts	Promotion or relegation
1	Anzhi Makhachkala (P)	42	26	8	8	55	20	+35	86	Promotion to Top Division
2	Fakel Voronezh (P)	42	26	7	9	65	31	+34	85	Promotion to Top Division
3	Sokol Saratov	42	25	7	10	74	39	+35	82	
4	Torpedo-ZIL Moscow	42	23	13	6	67	27	+40	82	
5	Baltika Kaliningrad	42	22	8	12	60	37	+23	74	
6	Amkar Perm	42	20	10	12	65	49	+16	70	
7	Rubin Kazan	42	18	12	12	56	49	+7	66	
8	Gazovik-Gazprom Izhevsk	42	20	4	18	50	47	+3	64	
9	Arsenal Tula	42	19	7	16	61	51	+10	64	
10	Lokomotiv Chita	42	19	5	18	48	50	−2	62	
11	Kristall Smolensk	42	17	7	18	44	49	−5	58	
12	Tom Tomsk	42	17	7	18	48	54	−6	58	
13	Spartak Nalchik	42	17	5	20	49	61	−12	56	
14	Metallurg Krasnoyarsk	42	14	12	16	38	43	−5	54	
15	Metallurg Lipetsk	42	15	8	19	51	53	−2	53	
16	Lokomotiv St. Petersburg	42	14	9	19	35	51	−16	51	
17	Volgar-Gazprom Astrakhan	42	14	8	20	41	49	−8	50	
18	Tyumen (R)	42	13	9	20	43	59	−16	48	Relegation to Second Division
19	Torpedo-Viktoriya Nizhny Novgorod (R)	42	11	10	21	47	67	−20	43	Relegation to Second Division
20	Lada-Simbirsk Dimitrovgrad (Note: FC Lada-Grad Dimitrovgrad renamed to FC Lada-Simbirsk.) (R)	42	12	4	26	37	66	−29	40 (Note: Dynamo Stavropol awarded 3-0 victory in their home game against Lada-Simbirsk Dimitrovgrad. Lada-Simbirsk did not arrive for the game as they were considering dropping out of the league altogether at the time before receiving last-second financing commitments.)	Relegation to Second Division
21	Dynamo Stavropol (R)	42	10	9	23	28	50	−22	39	Relegation to Second Division
22	Spartak-Orekhovo Orekhovo-Zuyevo (R)	42	2	7	33	25	85	−60	13	Relegation to Second Division

Source: RSSSF
(P) Promoted; (R) Relegated

==== Top goalscorers ====
Rank	Name	Goals	Team
1	Konstantin Paramonov	23	Amkar
2	Mikhail Jishkariani	20	Sokol
3	Andradina	18	Arsenal
4	Andrei Fedkov	16	Baltika
5	Andrei Bakalets	14	Torpedo-Victoria
	Vadim Belokhonov	14	Metallurg Krasnoyarsk
	Sergei Bulatov	14	Fakel
	Vaso Sepashvili	14	Spartak
9	Nail Galimov	13	Lokomotiv Chita
10	Aleksei Kocharygin	12	Tyumen

=== Second Division ===
Of six clubs that finished first in their respective Second Division zones, three play-off winners were promoted to the First Division:

Team 1	Agg.	Team 2	1st leg	2nd leg
FC Spartak-Chukotka Moscow (Centre)	5–2	FC Avtomobilist Noginsk (West)	1–1	4–1
FC Lada-Togliatti-VAZ Togliatti (Povolzhye)	3–2	FC Kuban Krasnodar (South)	2–1	1–1
FC Nosta Novotroitsk (Ural)	4–3	FC Metallurg Novokuznetsk (East)	3–1	1–2

== Cup ==
The Russian Cup was won by Zenit Saint Petersburg, who beat Dynamo Moscow 3–1 in the final.

== UEFA club competitions ==
=== UEFA Cup Winners' Cup 1998-99 ===
Lokomotiv Moscow reached the semifinal of the last Cup Winners' Cup, defeating Maccabi Haifa in the quarterfinal 4–0 on aggregate. In the semifinal Lokomotiv were eliminated by eventual winners S.S. Lazio on away goals.

=== UEFA Intertoto Cup 1999 ===
FC Rostov eliminated Cementarnica 55 Skopje and NK Varteks in the UEFA Intertoto Cup 1999, setting up a tie against Juventus FC Juventus comfortably won twice, recording a 9–1 aggregate score.

=== UEFA Champions League 1999-00 ===
CSKA Moscow began their campaign in the second qualifying round but lost to Molde F.K. Spartak Moscow successfully passed the third qualifying round, eliminating FK Partizan, and qualified for the main competition where they finished third in a group with AC Sparta Prague, FC Girondins de Bordeaux, and Willem II Tilburg.

=== UEFA Cup 1999-00 ===
Lokomotiv Moscow started 1999–00 UEFA Cup in the qualifying round. After eliminating BATE Borisov with the score 12–1 Lokomotiv defeated Lyngby Boldklub 5–1 on aggregate in the first round, but lost to Leeds United A.F.C. with the aggregate score of 1–7. Russia's second participants, Zenit Saint Petersburg were eliminated by Bologna F.C. 1909 in the first round.
