= Vyacheslav Lyskov =

Russian footballer

Personal information
- Full name: Vyacheslav Vladimirovich Lyskov
- Date of birth: 2 March 1988 (age 38)
- Height: 1.80 m (5 ft 11 in)
- Position: Defender

Senior career*
Years	Team	Apps	(Gls)
2005–2006	FC Zvezda Irkutsk	2	(0)
2007	FC Zvezda-Rekord Irkutsk		
2008	FC Zvezda Irkutsk	3	(0)
2010	FC Zenit-Radian Irkutsk		
2011–2013	FC Sibiryak Bratsk	45	(0)
2013	FC Baikal Irkutsk	1	(0)
2014	FC Sibiryak Bratsk	8	(0)
- * Club domestic league appearances and goals

Vyacheslav Vladimirovich Lyskov (Russian: Вячеслав Владимирович Лысков; born 2 March 1988) is a former Russian football defender.

== Club career ==
He played in the Russian Football National League for FC Zvezda Irkutsk in 2008.
