= Vladimir Kazakov (footballer, born 1950) =

Russian footballer

Personal information
- Full name: Vladimir Ivanovich Kazakov
- Date of birth: 22 June 1950
- Place of birth: Yeysk, Russian SFSR
- Date of death: 8 April 2001 (aged 50)
- Place of death: Krasnodar, Russia
- Height: 1.68 m (5 ft 6 in)
- Positions: Midfielder; forward

Senior career*
Years	Team	Apps	(Gls)
1970	FC Spartak Moscow	1	(0)
1971	FC Spartak Yoshkar-Ola	49	(6)
1972–1976	FC Kuban Krasnodar	146	(17)
1976–1977	FC CSKA Kyiv	59	(5)
1978	FC Kuban Krasnodar	32	(1)
1979	FC Chernomorets Novorossiysk	27	(3)
- * Club domestic league appearances and goals

Vladimir Ivanovich Kazakov (Russian: Владимир Иванович Казаков; 22 June 1950 - 8 April 2001) was a Russian professional football player.
