= Mikhail Tyufyakov =

Russian former professional footballer (born 1974)

Personal information
- Full name: Mikhail Vyacheslavovich Tyufyakov
- Date of birth: 30 April 1974 (age 52)
- Place of birth: Kirov, Russian SFSR
- Height: 1.85 m (6 ft 1 in)
- Position: Forward

Senior career*
Years	Team	Apps	(Gls)
1991–1994	Vyatka Kirov	100	(17)
1995	Nosta Novotroitsk	3	(0)
1995–1997	Rubin Kazan	74	(13)
1998	Dynamo Perm	33	(9)
1999	Amkar Perm	1	(0)
1999	Dynamo Perm	28	(19)
2000	Neftekhimik Nizhnekamsk	31	(17)
2001	Volga Ulyanovsk	31	(15)
2002	KAMAZ Naberezhnye Chelny	27	(1)
2003	Luch-Energiya Vladivostok	12	(2)
2003	Volga Ulyanovsk	9	(1)
2004–2007	Dynamo Kirov	109	(38)
2008	Rubin-2 Kazan	17	(15)
2008	Lada Togliatti	15	(12)
2009	MTZ-RIPO Minsk	1	(0)
2009	Dynamo Bryansk	29	(17)
2010	Neftekhimik Nizhnekamsk	25	(19)
2011	Gornyak Uchaly	7	(0)
2012–2014	Dynamo Kirov	51	(7)

Managerial career
- 2014: Dynamo Kirov (team director)
- * Club domestic league appearances and goals

Mikhail Vyacheslavovich Tyufyakov (Russian: Михаил Вячеславович Тюфяков; born 30 April 1974) is a Russian former professional footballer.

== Club career ==
He made his Russian Football National League debut for FC Dynamo Kirov on 28 April 1992 in a game against FC Torpedo Ryazan. He played 2 seasons in the FNL for Dynamo Kirov and FC Amkar Perm.

== Honours ==
- Russian Second Division, Zone Ural top scorer: 1999 (19 goals).
- Russian Second Division, Zone Ural/Povolzhye top scorer: 2008 (27 goals), 2010 (19 goals).
- Russian Second Division, Zone Center top scorer: 2009 (17 goals).
- Russian Second Division, Zone Center best player and best striker: 2009.
- Russian Second Division, Zone Ural-Povolzhye best striker: 2010.
