= Klitsov =

Klitsov (Russian: Клицов), female form Klitsova (Russian: Клицова), is a Russian surname.

Notable people with this surname include:

- Igor Klitsov (born 1986), Russian football player
- Dmitry Klitsov (born 1988), Russian football player
