= Mogilny =

Mogilny (Russian: Могильный), feminine: Mogilnaya is a Russian surname. Ukrainian counterpart: Mohylnyi. It may refer to

- Alexander Mogilny (born 1969), Russian ice hockey player
- Valentin Mogilny (1965–2015), Soviet artistic gymnast
- Vyacheslav Mogilny (born 1971), Russian-Ukrainian football coach and former player

== See also ==
- 33509 Mogilny, minor planet
