= 2002 Russian First Division =

Russian First Division
- Season: 2002

The 2002 Russian First Division was the 11th edition of Russian First Division. There were 18 teams.

== Standings ==
Pos	Team	Pld	W	D	L	GF	GA	GD	Pts	Promotion or relegation
1	Rubin Kazan (P)	34	22	6	6	51	14	+37	72	Promotion to Premier League
2	Chernomorets Novorossiysk (P)	34	20	10	4	59	29	+30	70	Promotion to Premier League
3	Tom Tomsk	34	17	10	7	51	23	+28	61	
4	Kuban Krasnodar	34	15	9	10	44	30	+14	54	
5	Amkar Perm	34	15	9	10	47	31	+16	54	
6	Spartak Nalchik	34	14	11	9	42	30	+12	53	
7	Khimki	34	14	10	10	38	27	+11	52	
8	Lada-Togliatti	34	13	11	10	54	35	+19	50	
9	Lokomotiv Chita	34	12	9	13	38	46	−8	45	
10	Kristall Smolensk	34	12	8	14	39	43	−4	44	
11	Gazovik-Gazprom	34	10	14	10	34	32	+2	44	
12	SKA-Khabarovsk	34	10	12	12	35	37	−2	42	
13	Fakel Voronezh	34	10	10	14	34	42	−8	40	
14	Neftekhimik Nizhnekamsk	34	11	5	18	34	49	−15	38	
15	Volgar-Gazprom Astrakhan	34	10	6	18	34	51	−17	36	
16	Dynamo St. Petersburg (Note: Dynamo SPb were awarded 0–3 defeats in ten matches for fielding ineligible players)	34	9	9	16	28	56	−28	36	
17	SKA Rostov-on-Don (R)	34	8	7	19	38	62	−24	31	Relegation to Second Division
18	Metallurg Krasnoyarsk (Note: Metallurg were docked 24 points for failing to pay transfer fees for four players) (R)	34	4	4	26	24	87	−63	−8	Relegation to Second Division

Source: PFL, RSSSF
(P) Promoted; (R) Relegated

== Results ==
Home \ Away	AMK	CHE	DSP	FAK	GGI	KHI	KRI	KUB	LAD	LCH	MKR	NEF	RUB	SKA	SKR	SPN	TOM	VOL
Amkar Perm		1–1	3–0	1–1	2–1	0–0	1–2	2–1	0–0	1–1	2–0	1–0	3–0	2–1	2–1	4–0	1–0	5–2
Chernomorets Novorossiysk	1–0		5–1	2–2	1–0	1–0	3–2	2–0	1–0	3–1	6–0	3–1	3–1	1–0	1–0	3–1	0–0	2–0
Dynamo St. Petersburg	0–0	2–0		1–2	0–3	0–3	1–0	0–1	0–3	2–0	0–3	0–3	1–0	4–1	2–2	0–3	1–3	2–0
Fakel Voronezh	2–0	0–1	0–3		2–0	1–2	0–0	0–1	1–1	1–1	2–0	5–2	0–2	0–0	0–1	0–0	2–1	3–0
Gazovik-Gazprom	1–0	2–1	1–1	0–1		0–0	1–0	1–1	1–1	1–1	5–0	0–0	0–0	0–0	2–1	1–0	1–0	2–2
Khimki	1–1	1–2	0–0	0–0	1–1		1–1	3–1	1–2	0–1	2–0	3–1	0–0	1–0	1–0	2–2	0–0	3–1
Kristall Smolensk	3–1	2–2	2–3	3–0	1–1	2–1		1–0	2–1	0–0	1–0	1–0	0–3	1–2	2–3	1–0	3–2	1–0
Kuban Krasnodar	2–0	1–1	3–0	2–1	3–0	0–1	0–0		3–1	1–0	4–1	1–0	0–1	4–1	4–0	1–1	1–1	1–0
Lada-Togliatti	1–1	1–4	3–0	4–0	1–1	2–0	1–0	1–1		1–0	1–1	2–3	0–2	0–0	2–1	3–2	0–0	0–0
Lokomotiv Chita	1–2	0–1	3–0	2–2	2–1	1–0	1–1	2–1	0–2		0–1	0–1	1–0	2–0	2–1	2–0	4–2	2–1
Metallurg Krasnoyarsk	1–4	1–1	0–0	0–2	2–2	0–3	1–0	0–1	0–2	2–2		0–1	0–1	2–3	1–2	0–4	1–2	1–0
Neftekhimik Nizhnekamsk	3–0	1–1	0–0	2–1	1–2	0–3	1–0	0–0	1–4	0–1	3–1		0–1	1–0	4–1	0–2	0–2	4–0
Rubin Kazan	1–0	2–0	1–2	2–0	1–0	2–0	2–0	1–1	2–1	4–0	5–0	2–0		2–0	3–0	2–0	1–0	2–0
SKA-Khabarovsk	0–0	1–1	1–1	3–1	1–0	1–2	1–1	0–0	1–1	3–0	2–0	3–0	0–0		2–0	2–2	0–0	2–0
SKA Rostov-on-Don	0–4	1–1	3–0	2–0	0–2	2–1	3–4	1–2	1–1	2–2	3–1	0–0	0–4	3–4		1–1	0–0	1–0
Spartak Nalchik	1–0	0–2	0–0	0–0	2–0	2–0	2–1	2–1	1–0	2–2	4–1	2–0	0–0	1–0	3–0		0–0	2–0
Tom Tomsk	2–1	2–0	3–0	2–0	1–1	0–1	3–1	3–0	2–0	4–1	2–1	5–0	1–0	3–0	2–1	0–0		2–0
Volgar-Gazprom	0–2	2–2	1–1	1–2	2–0	0–1	2–0	2–1	2–1	3–0	5–2	2–1	1–1	1–0	2–1	1–0	1–1	

Source: PFL (in Russian)
Legend: Blue = home team win; Yellow = draw; Red = away team win.

== Top goalscorers ==
Rank	Player	Team	Goals
1	(Georgia (country)) David Chaladze	Rubin	20
2	(Russia) Vyacheslav Kamoltsev	Chernomorets	20
3	(Russia) Stanislav Lebedintsev	SKA-Khabarovsk	15
4	(Russia) Victor Karpenko	Lokomotiv (Ch)	14
5	(Russia) Konstantin Paramonov	Amkar	14
6	(Kazakhstan) Roman Uzdenov	Spartak (N)	12
7	(Russia) Eduard Zatsepin	Volgar-Gazprom	12
8	(Russia) Yevgeny Buda	Neftekhimik	10
9	(Russia) Vitali Safronov	Volgar-Gazprom	10
9	(Belarus) Yuri Shukanov	Dynamo (SPb)	10
11	(Russia) Maksim Autlev	Spartak (N)	10

== See also ==
- 2002 Russian Premier League
