= Aleksei Syropyatov =

Russian footballer

Personal information
- Full name: Aleksei Anatolyevich Syropyatov
- Date of birth: 27 January 1981 (age 45)
- Place of birth: Perm, Russian SFSR
- Height: 1.82 m (5 ft 11 1/2 in)
- Position: Defender

Youth career
- SDYuSShOR Perm

Senior career*
Years	Team	Apps	(Gls)
1999	Amkar Perm	0	(0)
1999–2002	Dynamo Perm	92	(2)
2003	Energetik Uren	36	(0)
2004	Zvezda Irkutsk	20	(0)
2005–2006	Darida Minsk Raion	46	(1)
2007	Vityaz Podolsk	1	(0)
2008	SKA Rostov-on-Don	25	(1)
2009	Metallurg Lipetsk	17	(0)
2009	Tyumen	13	(0)
2010	Dynamo Saint Petersburg	14	(0)
2011–2012	Dynamo Stavropol	16	(0)
2012	Oktan Perm	12	(0)
- * Club domestic league appearances and goals

Aleksei Anatolyevich Syropyatov (Russian: Алексей Анатольевич Сыропятов; born 27 January 1981) is a Russian former professional footballer.

== Club career ==
He made his Russian Football National League debut for FC SKA Rostov-on-Don on 27 March 2008 in a game against FC Dynamo Bryansk. He played 3 seasons in the FNL.
