= Rinat Aitov =

Russian footballer and coach

Personal information
- Full name: Rinat Nuraliyevich Aitov
- Date of birth: 10 August 1972 (age 54)
- Place of birth: Uzun, Surxondaryo Region, Uzbek SSR
- Height: 1.79 m (5 ft 10 in)
- Positions: Defender; midfielder

Senior career*
Years	Team	Apps	(Gls)
1996	FC Energiya Ulyanovsk (D4)		
1997–1999	FC Energiya Ulyanovsk	101	(10)
2000	FC Lada-Energiya Dimitrovgrad	32	(4)
2001–2004	FC Volga Ulyanovsk	129	(16)
2005–2006	FC Alnas Almetyevsk	57	(1)
2007–2010	FC Volga Ulyanovsk	93	(3)

Managerial career
- 2011–2012: FC Volga-d Ulyanovsk
- 2012–2019: FC Volga Ulyanovsk (assistant)
- 2019: FC Lada Dimitrovgrad
- 2019–2022: FC Volga Ulyanovsk
- * Club domestic league appearances and goals

Rinat Nuraliyevich Aitov (Russian: Ринат Нуралиевич Аитов; born 10 August 1972) is a Russian professional football coach and a former player who in 2019 became the manager of FC Volga Ulyanovsk.
