= Podshivalov =

Podshivalov (Russian: Подшивалов) is a Russian masculine surname, its feminine counterpart is Podshivalova. It may refer to

- Aleksandr Podshivalov (born 1964), Russian association football coach and former player
- Dmitri Podshivalov (born 1981), Russian football player
