= Russkikh =

Russkikh (Russian: Русских) is a surname. Notable people with the surname include:

- Aleksandr Russkikh (born 1983), Russian footballer
- Anastasia Russkikh (born 1983), Russian badminton player
- Natalia Russkikh (born 1985), Russian footballer
