= Valeri Yerkovich =

Russian footballer and coach

Personal information
- Full name: Valeri Borisovich Yerkovich
- Date of birth: 15 January 1951 (age 75)
- Place of birth: Petropavlovsk, Kazakh SSR
- Height: 1.83 m (6 ft 0 in)
- Position: Midfielder

Youth career
- FShM Alma-Ata

Senior career*
| Years | Team | Apps | (Gls) |
| 1969–1970 | Kairat | 0 | (0) |
| 1970–1972 | Spartak Semipalatinsk | | |
| 1973 | Kairat | 9 | (0) |
| 1974–1978 | Chkalovets Novosibirsk | | |
| 1979–1981 | Kuban Krasnodar | 73 | (10) |
| 1981 | Aktyubinets | 35 | (7) |
| 1982 | Druzhba Maykop | 27 | (3) |
| 1984 | Druzhba Maykop | 13 | (0) |

Managerial career
- 1988–1993: Chkalovets Novosibirsk
- 1994–1995: Portovik Kholmsk
- 1997: Chkalovets Novosibirsk
- 2002: Shakhtyor Prokopyevsk
- 2002: Chkalovets-1936 Novosibirsk (assistant)
- 2002–2003: Chkalovets-1936 Novosibirsk
- 2003: Chkalovets-1936 Novosibirsk (director of sports)
- 2004: Sibiryak Bratsk
- 2006–2007: Sibir Novosibirsk (assistant)
- 2014–2015: Sibir-2 Novosibirsk (director)
- * Club domestic league appearances and goals

Valeri Borisovich Yerkovich (Russian: Валерий Борисович Еркович; born 15 January 1951) is a Russian professional football coach and a former player.
