= Artur Karezhev =

Russian footballer

Personal information
- Full name: Artur Khazrailovich Karezhev
- Date of birth: 4 July 1980 (age 46)
- Height: 1.75 m (5 ft 9 in)
- Positions: Midfielder; forward

Senior career*
Years	Team	Apps	(Gls)
1999	PFC Spartak Nalchik	8	(0)
1999–2000	FC Nart Nartkala	40	(1)
2001	FC Spartak Yoshkar-Ola	8	(1)
2002–2005	FC Druzhba Maykop	126	(21)
2006	FC Spartak Kostroma	23	(2)
2007–2009	FC Druzhba Maykop	86	(8)
- * Club domestic league appearances and goals

Artur Khazrailovich Karezhev (Russian: Артур Хазраилович Карежев; born 4 July 1980) is a former Russian professional football player.

== Club career ==
He played in the Russian Football National League for PFC Spartak Nalchik in 1999.
