= Mikhail Gremyatskiy =

Russian footballer

Personal information
- Full name: Mikhail Valeryevich Gremyatskiy
- Date of birth: January 9, 1968 (age 58)
- Height: 1.81 m (5 ft 11 1/2 in)
- Position: Defender

Senior career*
| Years | Team | Apps | (Gls) |
| 1988 | SK EShVSM Moscow | 10 | (0) |
| 1988–1989 | FC Lokomotiv Moscow | 0 | (0) |
| 1989–1990 | FC Spartak Vladikavkaz | 52 | (0) |
| 1991–1992 | FC Asmaral Moscow | 33 | (0) |
| 1993 | PFC CSKA-d Moscow | 1 | (0) |
| 1993–1994 | IK Brage | 14 | (0) |
| 1995 | FC CSK VVS-Kristall Smolensk | 7 | (0) |
| 1995 | FC Irtysh Omsk | 4 | (0) |
| 1995–1996 | FC Orekhovo Orekhovo-Zuyevo | 11 | (0) |
| 1997 | FC Energiya Chaykovsky | 20 | (0) |
- * Club domestic league appearances and goals

Mikhail Valeryevich Gremyatskiy (Russian: Михаил Валерьевич Гремяцкий; born 9 January 1968) is a retired Russian professional footballer.

He played for the FC Lokomotiv Moscow in the USSR Federation Cup.
