= Korneyev =

Korneyev (Russian: Корне́ев), female form Korneyeva (Russian: Корне́ева), is a Russian surname. In English, Korneyev and Korneyeva are sometimes also transliterated as Korneev and Korneeva. Notable people with this surname include:

- Aleksandr Korneev (born 1980), Russian volleyball player
- Aleksey Korneyev (1939–2004), Russian footballer
- Alina Korneeva (born 2007), Russian tennis player
- Andrey Korneyev (1974–2014), Russian swimmer
- Igor Korneev (born 1967), Russian-Dutch footballer
- Konstantin Korneyev (born 1984), Russian ice hockey player
- Valeri Korneyev (born 1962), Russian footballer
