= Oleg Nikulin =

Russian footballer

Personal information
- Full name: Oleg Anatolyevich Nikulin
- Date of birth: 8 February 1970
- Date of death: 17 January 2006 (aged 35)
- Place of death: Novosibirsk, Russia
- Height: 1.80 m (5 ft 11 in)
- Position: Forward

Youth career
- DYuSSh-9 Olovokombinata Novosibirsk

Senior career*
Years	Team	Apps	(Gls)
1987–1991	FC Chkalovets Novosibirsk	113	(26)
1992	FC Rostselmash Rostov-on-Don	25	(1)
1992	→ FC Rostselmash-2 Rostov-on-Don (loan)	1	(0)
1993	FC Asmaral Moscow	9	(2)
1993–1996	FC Chkalovets Novosibirsk	83	(29)
1997	FC Samotlor-XXI Nizhnevartovsk	19	(3)
1998–1999	FC Chkalovets Novosibirsk	28	(9)
1999	FC Chkalovets-Olimpik Novosibirsk (amateur)		
2000–2002	FC Chkalovets-Olimpik Novosibirsk	34	(9)
- * Club domestic league appearances and goals

Oleg Anatolyevich Nikulin (Russian: Олег Анатольевич Никулин; born 8 February 1970; died 17 January 2006 in Novosibirsk) was a Russian football player.

He was a best scorer in history of FC Sibir Novosibirsk before being overtaken by Dmitri Akimov.
