= Konstantin Nizovtsev =

Russian footballer

Personal information
- Full name: Konstantin Stanislavovich Nizovtsev
- Date of birth: 25 March 1979 (age 47)
- Place of birth: Perm, Russian SFSR
- Height: 1.86 m (6 ft 1 in)
- Positions: Forward; centre back

Senior career*
Years	Team	Apps	(Gls)
1996–1998	FC Amkar Perm	5	(0)
1999–2001	FC Dynamo Perm	85	(22)
2002–2004	FC KAMAZ Naberezhnye Chelny	80	(14)
2005–2007	FC Alnas Almetyevsk	83	(14)
2008	FC Vityaz Podolsk	1	(0)
2008	FC Alnas Almetyevsk	18	(2)
2009	FC Chelyabinsk	27	(7)
2010–2012	FC Gazovik Orenburg	58	(12)
2012–2013	FC Volga Ulyanovsk	26	(0)
2013–2014	FC Oktan Perm	25	(0)
2014–2015	FC Spartak Kostroma	25	(1)
- * Club domestic league appearances and goals

Konstantin Stanislavovich Nizovtsev (Russian: Константин Станиславович Низовцев; born 25 March 1979) is a former Russian professional football player.

== Club career ==
He made his Russian Football National League debut for FC KAMAZ Naberezhnye Chelny on 31 March 2004 in a game against FC Neftekhimik Nizhnekamsk. He played 3 seasons in the FNL for KAMAZ, FC Vityaz Podolsk and FC Gazovik Orenburg.
