= Aleksandr Nenashkin =

Russian footballer and manager

Personal information
- Full name: Aleksandr Vladimirovich Nenashkin
- Date of birth: 11 June 1969 (age 57)
- Place of birth: Yoshkar-Ola, Russian SFSR
- Height: 1.82 m (5 ft 11 1/2 in)
- Positions: Defender; midfielder

Youth career
- FC Druzhba Yoshkar-Ola

Senior career*
Years	Team	Apps	(Gls)
1985–1987	FC Druzhba Yoshkar-Ola	21	(0)
1987	FC Stroitel Yoshkar-Ola		
1990	FC Stal Cheboksary	28	(3)
1991	FC Druzhba Yoshkar-Ola	36	(2)
1992	FC Krylia Sovetov Samara	0	(0)
1993–1994	FC Druzhba Yoshkar-Ola	42	(1)
1995	Abahani Limited		
1996	FC Rubin Kazan	22	(1)
1997–1998	FC Diana Volzhsk		
1999–2000	FC Volga Ulyanovsk	53	(1)
2001	FC Balakovo	19	(0)
2002–2003	FC Spartak Yoshkar-Ola	45	(0)
2004	FC Zvezda Shumerlya		
2006	FC Rubin Yadrin		

Managerial career
- 2012: FC Spartak Yoshkar-Ola (assistant)
- 2013–2015: FC Spartak Yoshkar-Ola
- * Club domestic league appearances and goals

Aleksandr Vladimirovich Nenashkin (Russian: Александр Владимирович Ненашкин; born 11 June 1969) is a Russian football manager and a former player.

Nenashkin played in the Russian First Division with FC Druzhba Yoshkar-Ola.
