= Sergei Bogdanov =

Sergei Bogdanov may refer to:

- Sergei Bogdanov (FSB spokesman), see Liberation Army of Dagestan
- Sergei Bogdanov (footballer) (born 1977), Russian footballer
- Sergey Bogdanov (rower) (born 1983), Uzbekistani rower who participated in the Olympics
