= Vladimir Pronin (footballer) =

Russian footballer

Personal information
- Full name: Vladimir Viktorovich Pronin
- Date of birth: 24 July 1973 (age 53)
- Place of birth: Yoshkar-Ola, Russia
- Height: 1.78 m (5 ft 10 in)
- Position: Midfielder

Senior career*
Years	Team	Apps	(Gls)
1992–1995	FC Druzhba Yoshkar-Ola	97	(8)
1996–2004	FC Volga Ulyanovsk	244	(90)
2005–2006	FC Dynamo Kirov	56	(12)
2007	FC Volga Ulyanovsk	14	(1)
2012	FC Spartak Yoshkar-Ola	10	(0)
- * Club domestic league appearances and goals

Vladimir Viktorovich Pronin (Russian: Владимир Викторович Пронин; born 24 July 1973) is a former Russian football midfielder.

== Club career ==
He played two seasons in the Russian Football National League for FC Druzhba Yoshkar-Ola.
