= Aleksandr Russkikh =

Russian footballer

Personal information
- Full name: Aleksandr Aleksandrovich Russkikh
- Date of birth: 11 September 1983 (age 43)
- Place of birth: Tomsk, Russian SFSR
- Height: 1.70 m (5 ft 7 in)
- Position: Midfielder

Youth career
- Voskhod Tomsk

Senior career*
| Years | Team | Apps | (Gls) |
| 2000–2001 | TGPU Tomsk | | |
| 2002–2003 | FC Yantar Seversk | | |
| 2004 | FC Shakhtyor Prokopyevsk | 22 | (0) |
| 2005–2006 | FC Tom Tomsk | 1 | (0) |
| 2007 | FC Chita | 20 | (1) |
| 2008 | FC Alyans-CSKA Vnukovo | | |
| 2008 | FC Mordovia Saransk | 15 | (0) |
| 2009 | FC Sakhalin Yuzhno-Sakhalinsk | 16 | (0) |
| 2010 | FC Tomsk | | |
| 2010 | TGU-Mister He Tomsk | | |
| 2010–2011 | FC Kaluga | 44 | (5) |
| 2013 | FC Olimp Yeysk | | |
| 2013 | FC Sibiryak Bratsk | 10 | (1) |
| 2014 | FK Banga Gargždai | 18 | (0) |
- * Club domestic league appearances and goals

Aleksandr Aleksandrovich Russkikh (Russian: Александр Александрович Русских; born 11 September 1983) is a former Russian professional footballer.

== Club career ==
He made his debut in the Russian Premier League in 2006 for FC Tom Tomsk.
