= Valeri Tolchev =

Russian footballer and coach

Personal information
- Full name: Valeri Stepanovich Tolchev
- Date of birth: January 1, 1956
- Date of death: November 3, 2006 (aged 50)
- Place of death: Omsk, Russia
- Height: 1.80 m (5 ft 11 in)
- Positions: Midfielder; defender; forward

Senior career*
Years	Team	Apps	(Gls)
1978	FC Angara Angarsk		
1979–1980	FC Kuzbass Kemerovo	70	(0)
1981–1984	FC Irtysh Omsk		
1990–1991	FC Angara Angarsk	23	(1)

Managerial career
- 1990–1991: FC Angara Angarsk (assistant)
- 1992: FC Agan Raduzhny (assistant)
- 1995: FC Dynamo Omsk (assistant)
- 1996: FC Samotlor-XXI Nizhnevartovsk (assistant)
- 1997: FC Angara Angarsk (director)
- 1998–2001: FC Sibiryak Bratsk
- 2002: FC Luch Vladivostok
- 2003: FC Chkalovets-Olimpik Novosibirsk
- 2003: FC Chkalovets-Olimpik Novosibirsk
- 2004–2005: FC Amur Blagoveshchensk
- * Club domestic league appearances and goals

Valeri Stepanovich Tolchev (Russian: Валерий Степанович Толчев; January 1, 1956 – November 3, 2006, in Omsk) was a Russian professional football coach and a player.
