= Vadim Belokhonov =

Russian footballer

Personal information
- Full name: Vadim Aleksandrovich Belokhonov
- Date of birth: 12 July 1973 (age 53)
- Place of birth: Zelenogorsk, Krasnoyarsk Krai
- Height: 1.82 m (5 ft 11 1/2 in)
- Positions: Midfielder; forward

Team information
- Current team: Yenisey-2 Krasnoyarsk (assistant coach)

Senior career*
| Years | Team | Apps | (Gls) |
| 1993–2000 | Metallurg Krasnoyarsk | 265 | (90) |
| 2001–2003 | Tom Tomsk | 24 | (5) |
| 2003 | Oryol | 13 | (4) |
| 2004 | Metallurg Krasnoyarsk | 26 | (12) |
| 2005 | Chkalovets-1936 Novosibirsk | 4 | (0) |
| 2005 | Metallurg Krasnoyarsk | 30 | (9) |
| 2006 | Sibiryak Bratsk | 23 | (6) |
| 2007–2009 | Metallurg-Kuzbass Novokuznetsk | 68 | (4) |

Managerial career
- 2010: Rassvet Krasnoyarsk
- 2011–2015: Restavratsiya Krasnoyarsk (assistant)
- 2016–2017: DYuSSh-17 Tomsk
- 2018–2019: Tom Tomsk (academy)
- 2020–2024: Yenisey Krasnoyarsk (academy)
- 2025–: Yenisey-2 Krasnoyarsk (assistant)
- * Club domestic league appearances and goals

Vadim Aleksandrovich Belokhonov (Russian: Вадим Александрович Белохонов; born 12 July 1973) is a Russian professional football coach and a former player. He is an assistant coach with Yenisey-2 Krasnoyarsk.

== Club career ==
He made his Russian Football National League debut for Metallurg Krasnoyarsk on 9 May 1993 in a game against Lokomotiv Chita.
