= Igor Klitsov =

Russian footballer

Personal information
- Full name: Igor Vladimirovich Klitsov
- Date of birth: 7 July 1986 (age 40)
- Height: 1.82 m (5 ft 11 1/2 in)
- Position: Defender

Youth career
- FC Spartak Bryansk
- FC Spartak Moscow

Senior career*
Years	Team	Apps	(Gls)
2002	FC Spartak-Youth Moscow		
2002	FC Kristall-SKA MVO Smolensk		
2004	FC Dynamo Stavropol	23	(0)
2005	FC Dynamo Stavropol (amateur)		
2006	Ditton Daugavpils	0	(0)
2007–2008	FC Dynamo Bryansk	23	(0)
2008–2009	DYuSSh-Dynamo Bryansk		
2010	FC Avangard Podolsk	12	(0)
2014	FC Partizan Bryansk		
2015	FC UchKhoz Kokino		
- * Club domestic league appearances and goals

Igor Vladimirovich Klitsov (Russian: Игорь Владимирович Клицов; born 7 July 1986) is a former Russian professional football player.

== Club career ==
He played two seasons in the Russian Football National League for FC Dynamo Bryansk.

== See also ==
- Football in Russia
