= Stanislav Chaplygin =

Russian footballer (born 1967)

Personal information
- Full name: Stanislav Vasilyevich Chaplygin
- Date of birth: 10 February 1967 (age 59)
- Place of birth: Barnaul, Russian SFSR
- Height: 1.81 m (5 ft 11 in)
- Positions: Midfielder; forward

Senior career*
Years	Team	Apps	(Gls)
1988–1990	FC Chkalovets Novosibirsk	89	(19)
1991	FC Dynamo Barnaul	1	(0)
1991	FC Progress Biysk	17	(2)
1992–2001	FC Metallurg-ZapSib Novokuznetsk	271	(99)
2002	FC Sibiryak Bratsk	19	(3)
- * Club domestic league appearances and goals

Stanislav Vasilyevich Chaplygin (Russian: Станислав Васильевич Чаплыгин; born 10 February 1967) is a retired Russian professional football player.

== Club career ==
He made his Russian Football National League debut for FC Metallurg Novokuznetsk on 9 May 1992 in a game against FC Sakhalin Yuzhno-Sakhalinsk. He also played in the FNL for Metallurg in 1993.

== Honours ==
- Russian Second Division Zone East top scorer: 1999 (23 goals), 2000 (13 goals).
