= Khas-Magomed Gilagayev =

Chechen footballer

Personal information
- Full name: Khas-Magomed-Said Gilagayev
- Date of birth: 28 February 1970 (age 56)
- Height: 1.79 m (5 ft 10 1/2 in)
- Positions: Midfielder; forward

Senior career*
Years	Team	Apps	(Gls)
1987–1988	FC Terek Grozny	27	(0)
1990	FC Dynamo Stavropol	27	(1)
1991	FC Terek Grozny	35	(11)
1992–1993	Stahl Brandenburg	4	(0)
1993–1994	FC Erzu Grozny	32	(4)
1995	FC Chernomorets Novorossiysk	17	(1)
1996	FC Dynamo Stavropol	19	(1)
1997–1998	FC Energiya Chaykovsky	65	(15)
1999–2000	FC Metallurg Novokuznetsk	36	(9)
2001–2002	FC Terek Grozny	44	(2)
- * Club domestic league appearances and goals

Khas-Magomed Said-Magomedovich Gilagayev (Russian: Хас-Магомед Саид-Магомедович Гилагаев; born 28 February 1970) is a retired Chechen professional footballer.
