= Sergei Galkin =

Russian footballer and coach

Personal information
- Full name: Sergei Alekseyevich Galkin
- Date of birth: 6 November 1964 (age 61)
- Height: 1.78 m (5 ft 10 in)
- Positions: Forward; defender

Team information
- Current team: FC Arsenal Tula (U-21 asst manager)

Youth career
- DYuSSh-3 Vologda

Senior career*
Years	Team	Apps	(Gls)
1982–1989	FC Dynamo Vologda	107	(25)
1990	FC Khimik Cherepovets	12	(0)
1990–1993	FC Dynamo Vologda	132	(41)
1994–1996	FC Chkalovets Novosibirsk	104	(28)
1997–2005	FC Dynamo Vologda	263	(47)

Managerial career
- 2007: FC Dynamo Vologda (assistant)
- 2008–2014: FC Dynamo Vologda
- 2016: FC Arsenal-2 Tula (assistant)
- 2016–: FC Arsenal Tula (U-21 assistant)
- * Club domestic league appearances and goals

Sergei Alekseyevich Galkin (Russian: Серге́й Алексеевич Галкин; born 6 November 1964) is a Russian professional football coach and a former player. He is an assistant manager with the Under-21 team of FC Arsenal Tula.

== Playing career ==
As a player, he made his debut in the Soviet Second League in 1982 for FC Dynamo Vologda. Galkin played in the Soviet First League with FC Dynamo Vologda and FC Chkalovets Novosibirsk.
