= Serhiy Yakovenko =

Ukrainian footballer (born 1975)

Personal information
- Full name: Serhiy Serhiyovych Yakovenko
- Date of birth: 10 May 1975 (age 51)
- Place of birth: Kharkiv, Ukrainian SSR
- Height: 1.70 m (5 ft 7 in)
- Position: Midfielder

Team information
- Current team: Helios Kharkiv (assistant)

Youth career
- Metallist Kharkov

Senior career*
Years	Team	Apps	(Gls)
1991	Metallist Kharkov	0	(0)
1992–1993	Olympik Kharkiv	9	(0)
1993	Zhemchuzhina Sochi	1	(0)
1993	→ Torpedo Adler (loan)	5	(1)
1994	Metalist Kharkiv	4	(0)
1994	Khimik Belorechensk	6	(3)
1994–1995	Arsenal Tula	42	(2)
1996–1998	Energiya Chaykovsky	98	(33)
1999	Amkar Perm	33	(7)
2000	Fakel Voronezh	11	(0)
2000–2001	Kristall Smolensk	26	(7)
2001–2002	Rubin Kazan	12	(2)
2002–2003	Baltika Kaliningrad	30	(4)
2003	Arsenal Kharkiv	14	(6)
2003–2004	MTZ-RIPO Minsk	24	(3)
2004	Neftekhimik Nizhnekamsk	15	(1)
2005	Ekibastuzets	17	(6)
2006	Lokomotyv Dvorichna	4	(0)
2006–2007	FK Rīga	36	(5)
2008	Komunalnyk Luhansk	5	(0)
2008–2010	Zirka Kirovohrad	36	(12)
Total		428	(92)

Managerial career
- 2010–2011: Metalist Kharkiv (scout)
- 2011–2013: Metalist Kharkiv (U21 coach)
- 2013–2014: Metalist Kharkiv (assistant)
- 2016–2017: Aktobe (assistant)
- 2017–: Helios Kharkiv (assistant)
- * Club domestic league appearances and goals

Serhiy Serhiyovych Yakovenko (Ukrainian: Сергій Сергійович Яковенко; born 10 May 1975) is a Ukrainian football coach and a former player.

== Honours ==
Rīga

- Latvian Higher League bronze: 2007
