= Sergei Iromashvili =

Russian professional football coach (born 1963)

Personal information
- Full name: Sergei Aleksandrovich Iromashvili
- Date of birth: January 22, 1963 (age 63)

Managerial career
- Years: Team
- 1993: FC Okean Nakhodka (director)
- 1997: FC Samotlor-XXI Nizhnevartovsk
- 1998–2002: FC Chkalovets-1936 Novosibirsk
- 2001–2002: FC Chkalovets-1936 Novosibirsk (president)
- 2003: FC Chkalovets-1936 Novosibirsk (vice-president)
- 2005–2006: FC Chkalovets Novosibirsk
- 2008: FC Dynamo Barnaul (assistant)
- 2009–2012: FC Dynamo Barnaul

Sergei Aleksandrovich Iromashvili (Russian: Серге́й Александрович Иромашвили; born January 22, 1963) is a Russian professional football coach.

Iromashvili managed Russian First Division side FC Chkalovets-1936 Novosibirsk from 2005 to 2006.
