= Vladimir Bubnov =

Russian footballer and coach

Personal information
- Full name: Vladimir Nikolayevich Bubnov
- Date of birth: June 26, 1940 (age 86)
- Position: Forward

Senior career*
Years	Team	Apps	(Gls)
1961–1962	FC Avangard Kamyshin		
1962–1963	FC Traktor Volgograd	9	(1)
1963–1967	FC Energiya Volzhsky		

Managerial career
- 1976: FC Torpedo Volzhsky (director)
- 1981–1982: FC Torpedo Volzhsky
- 1987: FC Rotor Volgograd (caretaker)
- 1990–1992: FC Tekstilshchik Kamyshin (assistant)
- 1992–1994: FC Vympel Rybinsk
- 1995–1997: FC Energiya Kamyshin (assistant)
- 1998: FC Rotor Kamyshin
- 1998: FC Energiya Ulyanovsk
- 1999: FC Torpedo Volzhsky (assistant)
- 2002–2003: FC Uralan Elista (reserves)
- * Club domestic league appearances and goals

Vladimir Nikolayevich Bubnov (Russian: Владимир Николаевич Бубнов; born June 26, 1940) is a Russian professional football coach and a former player. He currently works with the children's teams of FC Moscow.

Bubnov played in the Soviet First League with FC Traktor Volgograd.
