= Aleksandr Popov (footballer) =

Russian footballer

Personal information
- Full name: Aleksandr Sergeyevich Popov
- Date of birth: 23 June 1971 (age 55)
- Height: 1.80 m (5 ft 11 in)
- Positions: Midfielder; striker

Senior career*
Years	Team	Apps	(Gls)
1990–1991	FC Tekstilshchik Ivanovo	39	(0)
1992	FC Volzhanin Kineshma	38	(7)
1993–1994	FC Kraneks Ivanovo	41	(9)
1996–1999	FC Iskra Engels	112	(36)
2000–2001	FC Zvezda Irkutsk	43	(19)
2002	FC Lokomotiv Chita	5	(0)
- * Club domestic league appearances and goals

Aleksandr Sergeyevich Popov (Russian: Александр Серге́евич Попов; born 23 June 1971) is a former Russian professional football player.

== Club career ==
He played in the Russian Football National League for FC Lokomotiv Chita in 2002.

== Honours ==
- Russian Second Division Zone East top scorer: 2000 (13 goals).
