= Valentin Yerokhin =

Russian footballer and coach

Personal information
- Full name: Valentin Ivanovich Yerokhin
- Date of birth: July 24, 1945 (age 81)
- Height: 1.72 m (5 ft 8 in)
- Position: Midfielder

Senior career*
Years	Team	Apps	(Gls)
1964–1965	FC SKA Rostov-on-Don	0	(0)
1966	FC Rostselmash Rostov-on-Don		
1968	FC Torpedo Taganrog	31	(1)
1969–1971	FC Volgar Astrakhan	93	(12)
1976	FC Torpedo Taganrog	38	(3)

Managerial career
- 1989: FC MTsOP-Metallurg Sverdlovsk
- 1998: FC Uralmash Yekaterinburg
- 1999–2000: FC Torpedo Taganrog (administrator)
- 2001: FC Lokomotiv Liski (assistant)
- * Club domestic league appearances and goals

Valentin Ivanovich Yerokhin (Russian: Валентин Иванович Ерохин; born July 24, 1945) is a Russian professional football coach and a former player.

Yerokhin played in the Soviet First League with FC Rostselmash Rostov-on-Don, FC Torpedo Taganrog and FC Volgar Astrakhan.
