= Oleg Lidrik =

Russian footballer and official

Personal information
- Full name: Oleg Aleksandrovich Lidrik
- Date of birth: 17 May 1971 (age 55)
- Place of birth: Irkutsk, Russian SFSR
- Height: 1.78 m (5 ft 10 in)
- Positions: Forward; midfielder

Team information
- Current team: FC Baikal Irkutsk (president)

Senior career*
Years	Team	Apps	(Gls)
1988–1991	FC Zvezda Irkutsk	124	(15)
1992	FC Metallurg Aldan	8	(1)
1992–1997	FC Zvezda Irkutsk	175	(25)
1998–1999	FC Chkalovets Novosibirsk	54	(22)
2000	FC Chkalovets-Olimpik Novosibirsk	19	(9)
2001	FC Chkalovets-1936 Novosibirsk	26	(11)
2002–2005	FC Metallurg-Kuzbass Novokuznetsk	84	(37)
2005	FC Zvezda Irkutsk	24	(5)
2006	FC Fortuna Angarsk		
2008	FC Serviko Irkutsk		

Managerial career
- 2012–: FC Baikal Irkutsk (president)
- * Club domestic league appearances and goals

Oleg Aleksandrovich Lidrik (Russian: Олег Александрович Лидрик; born 17 May 1971) is a Russian professional football official and a former player. He is the president of FC Baikal Irkutsk.

== Honours ==
- Russian Second Division Zone East top scorer: 2002 (22 goals).
