= Valery Bogdanov (footballer, born 1952) =

Russian footballer and coach

Personal information
- Full name: Valery Petrovich Bogdanov
- Date of birth: 9 January 1952 (age 74)
- Place of birth: Kuybyshev, Russian SFSR
- Height: 1.81 m (5 ft 11 1/2 in)
- Position: Goalkeeper

Senior career*
Years	Team	Apps	(Gls)
1973–1980	Druzhba Yoshkar-Ola		

Managerial career
- 1982–1985: Druzhba Yoshkar-Ola (assistant)
- 1988: Druzhba Yoshkar-Ola (assistant)
- 1989: Druzhba Yoshkar-Ola
- 1989: Druzhba Yoshkar-Ola (assistant)
- 1990: Stal Cheboksary
- 1991–1993: Krylia Sovetov Samara (assistant)
- 1994: Krylia Sovetov Samara
- 1994: Druzhba Yoshkar-Ola
- 1995: Abahani Dhaka
- 1996: Druzhba Yoshkar-Ola
- 1997–1998: Gazovik Orenburg
- 1998–2001: Diana Volzhsk
- 2002–2003: Spartak Yoshkar-Ola
- 2004: Biokhimik-Mordovia Saransk
- * Club domestic league appearances and goals

Valery Petrovich Bogdanov (Russian: Валерий Петрович Богданов; born 9 January 1952) is a Russian professional football coach and a former player.

== Honours ==
=== Manager ===
Abahani Limited Dhaka

- Dhaka Premier Division League: 1995
