= Vyacheslav Mogilny =

Russian-Ukrainian footballer

Personal information
- Full name: Vyacheslav Viktorovich Mogilny
- Date of birth: 8 May 1971 (age 55)
- Place of birth: Dnipropetrovsk, Ukrainian SSR
- Height: 1.85 m (6 ft 1 in)
- Position: Goalkeeper

Senior career*
Years	Team	Apps	(Gls)
1989	FC Dnipro Dnipropetrovsk	0	(0)
1990–1991	FC Baltika Kaliningrad	75	(0)
1992–1995	FC Zhemchuzhina Sochi	15	(0)
1993	→ FC Torpedo Adler (loan)	1	(0)
1995	→ FC Zhemchuzhina-2 Sochi (loan)	1	(0)
1996	FC Kuban Krasnodar	17	(0)
1996	→ FC Kuban-d Krasnodar (loan)	2	(0)
1997	FC Dynamo-Zhemchuzhina-2 Sochi	0	(0)
1997–1999	FC Samotlor-XXI Nizhnevartovsk	81	(0)
2000–2001	FC Baltika Kaliningrad	0	(0)
2000–2001	→ FC Veteran Kaliningrad (loan)		

Managerial career
- 1999: FC Samotlor-XXI Nizhnevartovsk
- 2000–2004: FC Baltika Kaliningrad (assistant)
- 2003–2004: FC Baltika Kaliningrad (caretaker)
- 2004: FC Baltika Kaliningrad (caretaker)
- 2007: VMFD Žalgiris Vilnius (GK coach)
- 2007–2008: VMFD Žalgiris Vilnius
- 2009–2010: FC Gusev
- * Club domestic league appearances and goals

Vyacheslav Viktorovich Mogilny (Russian: Вячеслав Викторович Могильный; born 8 May 1971 in Dnipropetrovsk) is a Russian-Ukrainian football coach and a former player.
