= Vitali Papadopulo =

Russian footballer and coach

Personal information
- Full name: Vitali Vladimirovich Papadopulo
- Date of birth: February 19, 1963 (age 63)
- Height: 1.77 m (5 ft 10 in)
- Positions: Forward; midfielder

Team information
- Current team: FC Bataysk-2007 (administrator)

Senior career*
Years	Team	Apps	(Gls)
1981–1983	FC SKA Rostov-on-Don	38	(1)
1983–1987	FC Rostselmash Rostov-on-Don	154	(66)
1988–1989	FC SKA Rostov-on-Don	80	(33)
1990	FC Rostselmash Rostov-on-Don	34	(7)
1991	FC APK Azov	1	(1)
1991	Pallo-Iirot	9	(1)
1991–1992	FC Kristall Kherson	13	(3)
1992	FC Lokomotiv Nizhny Novgorod	11	(0)
1993–1994	Panionios	1	(0)
1994–1996	FC Rostselmash Rostov-on-Don	51	(3)
1997–1998	FC Torpedo Arzamas	60	(26)

Managerial career
- 2006: FC Bataysk (assistant)
- 2007–2008: FC Bataysk-2007 (VP of security)
- 2009–: FC Bataysk-2007 (administrator)
- * Club domestic league appearances and goals

Vitali Vladimirovich Papadopulo (Russian: Виталий Владимирович Пападопуло; born February 19, 1963 (in other sources - July 13, 1963)) is a Russian professional football coach and a former player. As of 2009, he works as an administrator with FC Bataysk-2007.
