= Andrei Bakalets =

Russian footballer

Personal information
- Full name: Andrei Vasilyevich Bakalets
- Date of birth: 7 January 1972 (age 54)
- Place of birth: Neustrelitz, East Germany
- Height: 1.81 m (5 ft 11 in)
- Positions: Forward; midfielder

Senior career*
Years	Team	Apps	(Gls)
1995–1997	FC MChS-Selyatino Selyatino	95	(49)
1998–1999	FC Torpedo-Viktoriya Nizhny Novgorod	68	(45)
2000–2001	FC Shinnik Yaroslavl	32	(8)
2001	FC Irtysh Pavlodar	15	(4)
2002	FC Chkalovets-1936 Novosibirsk	26	(8)
2003	FC Luch-Energiya Vladivostok	13	(9)
2004	FC Spartak Kostroma	22	(7)
2005	FC Spartak-MZhK Ryazan	12	(6)

Managerial career
- 2009–2010: FC Nara-ShBFR Naro-Fominsk (administrator)
- * Club domestic league appearances and goals

Andrei Vasilyevich Bakalets (Russian: Андрей Васильевич Бакалец; born 7 January 1972) is a former Russian professional football player.

== Club career ==
He played 3 seasons in the Russian Football National League for FC Torpedo-Viktoriya Nizhny Novgorod and FC Shinnik Yaroslavl.

== Honours ==
- Russian Second Division Zone Povolzhye top scorer: 1998 (31 goals).
