= Valeri Korneyev =

Russian footballer

Personal information
- Full name: Valeri Vladimirovich Korneyev
- Date of birth: 12 March 1962 (age 64)
- Place of birth: Bryansk, Russian SFSR
- Height: 1.80 m (5 ft 11 in)
- Position: Striker

Youth career
- FC Dynamo Bryansk

Senior career*
Years	Team	Apps	(Gls)
1979–1987	FC Dynamo Bryansk	209	(74)
1987–1989	FC Dynamo Stavropol	70	(23)
1989	FC Dynamo Bryansk	15	(14)
1989	FC Shakhtar Donetsk	3	(0)
1990	FC Spartak Vladikavkaz	32	(9)
1991	FC Dynamo Bryansk	38	(10)
1991–1992	FC Marek Dupnitsa		
1992	FC Kuban Krasnodar	2	(1)
1992	FC Krylia Sovetov Samara	11	(0)
1993–1995	FC Dynamo Stavropol	71	(18)
1995	FC Saturn Ramenskoye	10	(3)
1996–1998	FC Spartak Bryansk	98	(46)
1999	FC Dynamo Bryansk	17	(4)
1999–2000	FC SKA-Energiya Khabarovsk	23	(6)
2000	FC Dynamo Bryansk	13	(3)
2002	FC Kolomna	3	(0)

Managerial career
- 1997–1998: FC Spartak Bryansk
- 2000–2001: FC Dynamo Bryansk
- 2009–2014: FC Dynamo Bryansk (director)
- * Club domestic league appearances and goals

Valeri Vladimirovich Korneyev (Russian: Валерий Владимирович Корнеев; born 12 March 1962) is a Russian professional football coach and a former player.

== Club career ==
He made his professional debut in the Soviet Second League in 1979 for FC Dynamo Bryansk.

== Post-playing career ==
On 15 January 2021, he was banned from any football activity for life after FC Dynamo Bryansk fielded 3 players who tested positive for COVID-19 in a league game and submitted fake negative test results to the league.
