= Iuri Gabiskiria =

Georgian footballer

Iuri Gabiskiria იური გაბისკირია
Personal information
- Date of birth: 1 September 1968 (age 58)
- Place of birth: Bakuriani, Georgian SSR
- Height: 1.74 m (5 ft 8 1/2 in)
- Position: Midfielder

Senior career*
Years	Team	Apps	(Gls)
1986	Dinamo Sokhumi	16	(1)
1988–1990	Torpedo Kutaisi	75	(6)
1990–1993	Tskhumi Sokhumi	111	(24)
1993–1995	Temp Shepetivka	53	(8)
1995	Shakhtar Donetsk	1	(0)
1995	Temp-Advis Shepetivka	7	(0)
1995	Kryvbas Kryvyi Rih	6	(0)
1996	KAMAZ-Chally Naberezhnye Chelny	7	(0)
1997–1998	Kuban Slavyansk-na-Kubani	32	(14)
1999	Kuban Krasnodar	35	(18)
1999–2000	Hapoel Bnei Sakhnin		
2001	Spartak Nalchik	15	(0)
2002–2004	Sioni Bolnisi	76	(17)
2004–2006	Borjomi	55	(13)
2006–2007	Ameri Tbilisi	6	(0)

International career
1993	Georgia	1	(0)
- * Club domestic league appearances and goals

Iuri Gabiskiria (Georgian: იური გაბისკირია; born 1 September 1968) is a Georgian former professional footballer. He made his professional debut in the Soviet Second League in 1988 for FC Torpedo Kutaisi. He played 2 games in the UEFA Cup 2006–07 for FC Ameri Tbilisi.
