= Stanislav Lebedintsev =

Russian footballer

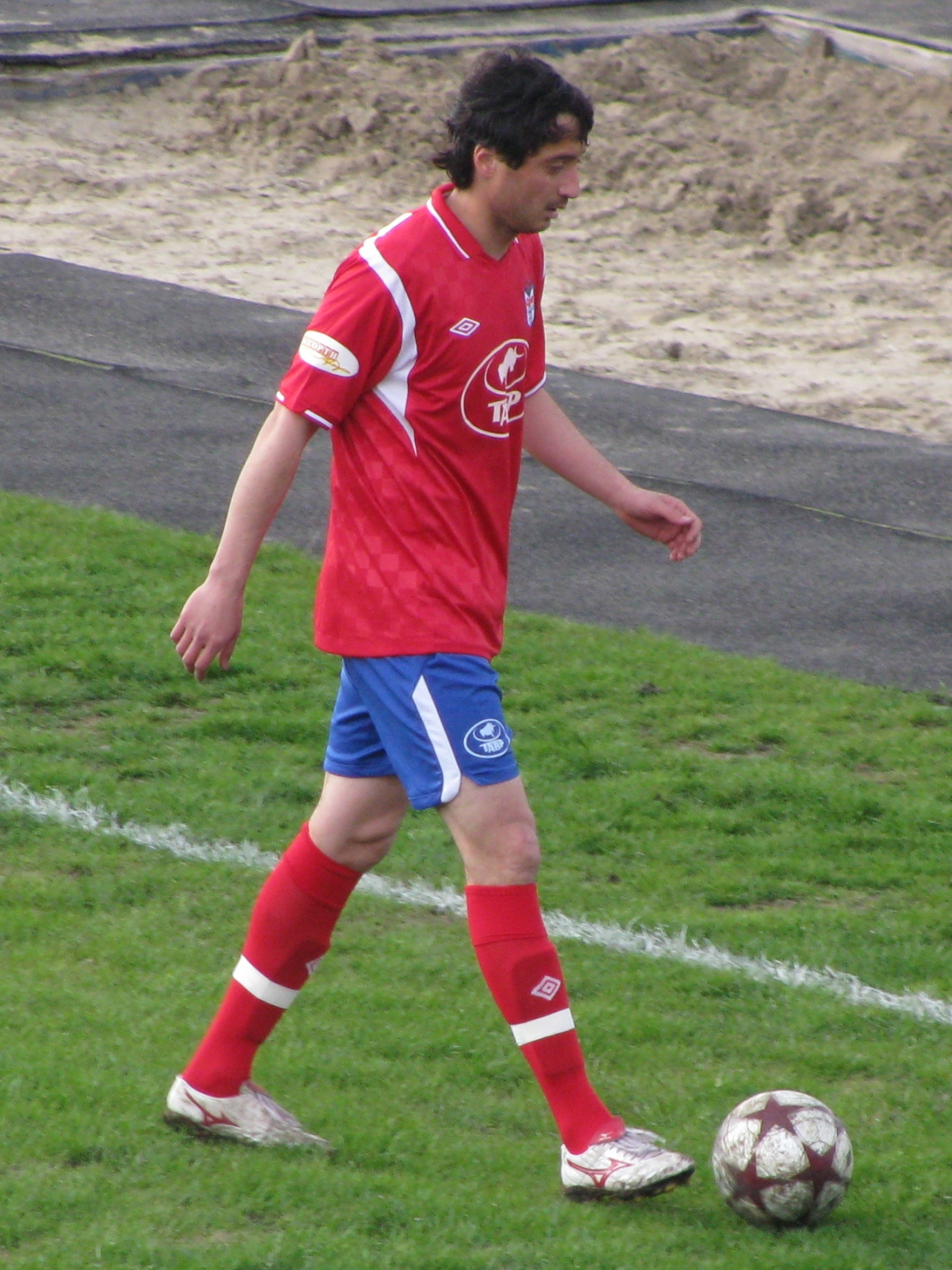

Personal information
- Full name: Stanislav Vladimirovich Lebedintsev
- Date of birth: 18 March 1978 (age 48)
- Place of birth: Ashgabat, Turkmen SSR
- Height: 1.82 m (5 ft 11 1/2 in)
- Positions: Midfielder; striker

Youth career
- FK Köpetdag Aşgabat
- 1995–1997: Anderlecht

Senior career*
Years	Team	Apps	(Gls)
1997	Nisa Aşgabat		
1998–2003	FC SKA Rostov-on-Don	154	(92)
2003	FC Dynamo-SPb St. Petersburg	16	(1)
2004	FC Lada Togliatti	18	(4)
2005	FC Alternativa Rostov-on-Don (D4)		
2005–2006	FC Energetik	35	(12)
2007	FC Nika Krasny Sulin (D4)		
2007–2009	FC SKA Rostov-on-Don	51	(15)
2010	FC Lokomotiv Liski	26	(2)
2011–2013	FC SKA Rostov-on-Don	45	(10)
2014	FC SKVO Rostov-on-Don	5	(0)
- * Club domestic league appearances and goals

Stanislav Vladimirovich Lebedintsev (Russian: Станислав Владимирович Лебединцев; born 18 March 1978) is a former Russian professional footballer.

== Club career ==
He played 3 seasons in the Russian Football National League for FC SKA Rostov-on-Don.
