= Aleksandr Tatarkin =

Russian footballer

Personal information
- Full name: Aleksandr Aleksandrovich Tatarkin
- Date of birth: 4 July 1966 (age 60)
- Place of birth: Kazan, Russian SFSR, Soviet Union
- Height: 1.84 m (6 ft 0 in)
- Position: Striker

Team information
- Current team: FC SKA Rostov-on-Don (asst manager)

Senior career*
Years	Team	Apps	(Gls)
1984–1986	FC Rubin Kazan	38	(4)
1987–1989	FC SKA Rostov-on-Don	64	(3)
1989–1991	FC Rostselmash Rostov-on-Don	100	(20)
1992	FC Spartak Moscow	9	(1)
1992–1993	NK Istra	13	(0)
1993	FC Rostselmash Rostov-on-Don	13	(2)
1994–1995	FC Lokomotiv Moscow	27	(5)
1996–1997	FC Tyumen	58	(16)
1998–1999	FC Volgar-Gazprom Astrakhan	41	(20)
1999	FC Lada Togliatti	31	(13)

Managerial career
- 2018–: FC SKA Rostov-on-Don (assistant)
- * Club domestic league appearances and goals

Aleksandr Aleksandrovich Tatarkin (Russian: Александр Александрович Татаркин; born 4 July 1966) is a Russian professional football coach and a former player. He is an assistant coach with FC SKA Rostov-on-Don.

== Club career ==
He made his professional debut in the Soviet Second League in 1984 for FC Rubin Kazan.

== Honours ==
- Russian Premier League champion: 1992.
- Russian Premier League runner-up: 1995.
- Russian Premier League bronze: 1994.
- Soviet Cup winner: 1992.

== External sources ==
- Aleksandr Tatarkin at Croatian Football Statistics (archived) (in Croatian)
