= Vladimir Susin =

Russian footballer and manager (1956–2025)

Personal information
- Full name: Vladimir Sergeyevich Susin
- Date of birth: 11 June 1956
- Place of birth: Kaluga, Russian SFSR, USSR
- Date of death: 26 November 2025 (aged 69)
- Height: 1.72 m (5 ft 8 in)
- Position: Striker

Senior career*
Years	Team	Apps	(Gls)
1978–1979	Lokomotiv Moscow	14	(1)
1979	FC Lokomotiv Kaluga		
1980–1981	SKA Khabarovsk	91	(16)
1982	FC Lokomotiv Moscow	9	(0)
1983	SKA Khabarovsk	39	(6)

Managerial career
- 1994–1995: SKA Khabarovsk (assistant)
- 1996–1998: SKA Khabarovsk
- 1999–2001: Okean Nakhodka
- 2002–2005: FC Smena Komsomolsk-na-Amure
- 2006–2009: FC LuTEK-Energiya Luchegorsk (assistant)
- 2010: FC Mostovik-Primorye Ussuriysk
- * Club domestic league appearances and goals

Vladimir Sergeyevich Susin (Russian: Владимир Серге́евич Сусин; 11 June 1956 – 26 November 2025) was a Russian professional football coach and a player. He last managed FC Mostovik-Primorye Ussuriysk in the Russian Second Division in 2010. Susin died on 26 November 2025, at the age of 69.
