= Dmitri Podshivalov =

Russian footballer

Personal information
- Full name: Dmitri Igorevich Podshivalov
- Date of birth: 18 January 1981 (age 45)
- Place of birth: Moscow, Russian SFSR
- Height: 1.80 m (5 ft 11 in)
- Position: Forward

Youth career
- FC Dynamo Moscow

Senior career*
Years	Team	Apps	(Gls)
1999–2001	FC Dynamo Moscow	3	(0)
1999–2000	→ FC Dynamo-d Moscow (loans)	47	(25)
2002	FC Arsenal-2 Tula	31	(2)
2003	FC Spartak Shchyolkovo	8	(0)
- * Club domestic league appearances and goals

Dmitri Igorevich Podshivalov (Russian: Дмитрий Игоревич Подшивалов; born 18 January 1981) is a former Russian football player.
