= Leonid Shevchenko =

Russian football manager

Personal information
- Full name: Leonid Vladimirovich Shevchenko
- Date of birth: 24 October 1932
- Date of death: 17 March 2017 (aged 84)

Managerial career
- Years: Team
- 1954–1955: Shakhtyor Mosbass Bobrik-Gora (assistant)
- 1982–1983: Nistru Chişinău
- 1984–1985: Terek Grozny
- 1987: Znamya Truda Orekhovo-Zuyevo
- 1988–1989: Dynamo Vologda
- 1990: Fakel Voronezh
- 1990–1991: Zarya Kaluga
- 1992–1993: Sherstyanik Nevinnomyssk
- 1994–1996: Chkalovets Novosibirsk
- 1998: Spartak Shchyolkovo
- 1999: Nosta Novotroitsk
- 2003–2006: Dynamo Vologda

Leonid Vladimirovich Shevchenko (Russian: Леонид Владимирович Шевченко; 24 October 1932 – 17 March 2017) was a Russian professional football coach. He led Nistru Chişinău to promotion to the Soviet Top League in 1982.
