= Sergei Bogdanov (footballer) =

Russian footballer

Personal information
- Full name: Sergei Dmitriyevich Bogdanov
- Date of birth: 11 March 1977 (age 49)
- Height: 1.80 m (5 ft 11 in)
- Position: Forward

Senior career*
Years	Team	Apps	(Gls)
1994–1996	Kuban Krasnodar	20	(1)
1996	→ Kuban-d Krasnodar	29	(13)
1997	Lada-Togliatti-VAZ	15	(0)
1998	Anapa	16	(8)
1998–1999	Metallurg Krasnoyarsk	38	(16)
2002	Gazovik-Gazprom Izhevsk	18	(3)
2003	Tobol Kostanay	11	(3)
2003	Slavyansk Slavyansk-na-Kubani	13	(5)
2004	Uralan Elista	13	(2)
2005	Amur Blagoveshchensk	33	(3)
2006–2007	Vitebsk	13	(2)
2007	Amur Blagoveshchensk	15	(6)
2008	Gornyak Uchaly	15	(7)
2009	Dynamo Vologda	31	(5)
- * Club domestic league appearances and goals

Sergei Dmitriyevich Bogdanov (Russian: Серге́й Дмитриевич Богданов; born 11 March 1977) is a former Russian professional footballer.

== Honours ==
- Kazakhstan Premier League runner-up: 2003.
- Russian Second Division Zone East top scorer: 1998 (13 goals).
