= Pavel Palatin =

Russian footballer and coach

Personal information
- Full name: Pavel Vladimirovich Palatin
- Date of birth: March 12, 1962 (age 64)
- Height: 1.81 m (5 ft 11 1/2 in)
- Positions: Midfielder; defender

Senior career*
Years	Team	Apps	(Gls)
1988	FC Okean Nakhodka	1	(0)
1993	FC Okean-d Nakhodka	11	(1)

Managerial career
- 1996: FC Okean Nakhodka (assistant)
- 1997–1999: FC Okean Nakhodka
- 2006–: FC LuTEK-Energiya Luchegorsk (D4)
- * Club domestic league appearances and goals

Pavel Vladimirovich Palatin (Russian: Павел Владимирович Палатин; born March 12, 1962) is a Russian professional football coach and a former player. He currently manages the Amateur Football League side FC LuTEK-Energiya Luchegorsk.
