= Dmitri Akimov =

Russian footballer (1980–2026)

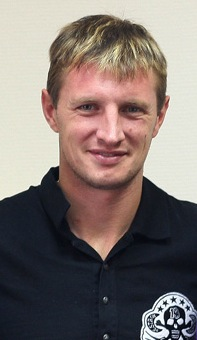
- Akimov in 2009

Personal information
- Full name: Dmitri Sergeyevich Akimov
- Date of birth: 14 September 1980
- Place of birth: Leningrad, Russian SFSR, Soviet Union
- Date of death: 14 January 2026 (aged 45)
- Height: 1.80 m (5 ft 11 in)
- Position: Forward

Senior career*
Years	Team	Apps	(Gls)
1998–2000	Zenit-2 St. Petersburg	59	(27)
2000–2001	Zenit Saint Petersburg	4	(0)
2000	→ Dinamo Minsk (loan)	15	(5)
2001	Lokomotiv-Zenit-2 St. Petersburg	19	(14)
2002	Tyumen	29	(22)
2003	Metallurg Lipetsk	37	(4)
2004–2008	Sibir Novosibirsk	168	(111)
2008–2010	Rostov	52	(16)
2011–2012	Sibir Novosibirsk	46	(20)
2012–2013	Fakel Voronezh	24	(3)
2013–2014	Dynamo Saint Petersburg	24	(6)
- * Club domestic league appearances and goals

Dmitri Sergeyevich Akimov (Russian: Дмитрий Сергеевич Акимов; 14 September 1980 – 14 January 2026) was a Russian professional footballer who played as a forward.

== Career ==
Akimov made his debut in the Russian Premier League in 2000 for Zenit Saint Petersburg. He was the top scorer in the Russian First Division in 2007, scoring 34 goals. He was also the top scorer in the Russian Second Division, East Zone in 2002 (22 goals) and 2004 (24 goals). He last played for Dynamo Saint Petersburg.

== Death ==
Akimov died on 14 January 2026, at the age of 45 from acute heart failure.

== Honours ==
Zenit Saint Petersburg

- Russian Premier League bronze: 2001

Individual

- Russian First Division top scorer: 2007
- Russian Second Division Zone East best player: 2004
