= Aleksei Kocharygin =

Russian footballer

Personal information
- Full name: Aleksei Vladimirovich Kocharygin
- Date of birth: 17 February 1976 (age 50)
- Place of birth: Moscow, Russian SFSR
- Height: 1.74 m (5 ft 8 1/2 in)
- Positions: Forward; midfielder

Youth career
- SDYuSShOR-94 Krylatskoye Moscow

Senior career*
Years	Team	Apps	(Gls)
1996–1997	FC Spartak-d Moscow	67	(19)
1998	FC Spartak-2 Moscow	39	(18)
1999	FC Tyumen	23	(12)
2000	FC Shinnik Yaroslavl	9	(3)
2000–2001	FC Khimki	31	(8)
2001	FC Sibur-Khimik Dzerzhinsk	14	(4)
2002–2003	FC Lobnya-Alla Lobnya (amateur)		
2004–2007	FC Lobnya-Alla Lobnya	108	(33)
2008–2009	FC Zvezda Serpukhov	56	(15)
2010	FC Zvezda Serpukhov (amateur)		
2011–2012	FC Oka Stupino (amateur)		
2012–2013	FC Troitsk Moscow		
2015–2017	FC Metallist Domodedovo		
- * Club domestic league appearances and goals

Aleksei Vladimirovich Kocharygin (Russian: Алексей Владимирович Кочарыгин; born 17 February 1976) is a former Russian professional football player.

== Club career ==
He played 3 seasons in the Russian Football National League for FC Tyumen, FC Shinnik Yaroslavl and FC Khimki.
