= FC Spartak-Peresvet Bryansk =

FC Spartak Bryansk
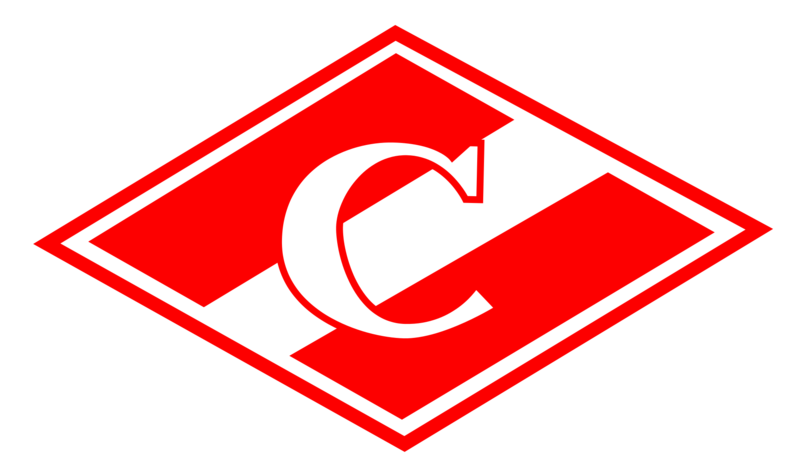
- Full name: Football Club Spartak Bryansk
- Founded: 1946
- League: Russian Second Division, Zone West
- 1999: 20th

FC Spartak Bryansk (Russian: «Спартак» (Брянск)) is a Russian football team from Bryansk. It played professionally from 1996 to 1999. Their best result was 9th place in the Russian Second Division, Zone West in 1998.

== Team name history ==
- 1946–1954 DSO Spartak Bryansk
- 1993–1999 FC Spartak Bryansk
- 1999-2000 FC Spartak-Peresvet Bryansk
- 2026 FC Spartak Bryansk
