= FC Sibir Novosibirsk =

- Full name: Football Club Sibir Novosibirsk
- Nickname: Orly (The Eagles)
- Founded: 1936; 90 years ago
- Dissolved: 2019; 7 years ago
- Ground: Spartak Stadium, Novosibirsk
- Capacity: 12,500
- League: N/A
- 2018–19: FNL, 18th (relegated)
Home colours	Away colours

FC Sibir Novosibirsk (Russian: ФК «Сибирь» Новосибирск) was a Russian association football club based in Novosibirsk, playing at the Spartak Stadium. They played their first-ever season in the Russian Premier League in 2010, and ended with relegation to the Russian First Division.

== History ==
The club was founded in 1936 and has been known as:

- Krylya Sovetov (Soviet Wings) in 1936–1956
- Sibselmash (Siberian Agricultural Machinery) in 1957–1965
- SETM (Siberian Electrical Heavy Engineering) in 1969–1970
- Dzerzhinets (after Felix Dzerzhinsky) in 1971
- Chkalovets (after Valery Chkalov) in 1972–1991 and 1993–1999
- Chkalovets-FoKuMiS in 1992
- Chkalovets-1936 in 2000–2005
- Sibir (Siberia) 2006–2019

The team played in the Soviet leagues in 1937 (Group E), 1946–1947 (Third Group and Second Group), in 1957–1962 (Class B), 1963–1968 (Class A), 1969–1984 (Class B and Second League), and in 1987–1991 (Second League and Second League B).

In 1992 Chkalovets entered the newly formed Russian First League and in 1994 was moved to the Russian Second League after the reduction of the First League. In 1994 Chkalovets were promoted to the First League, where they played in 1995 and 1996. In 1996 Chkalovets finished last among 22 teams and were relegated to the Second League.

In 2000 Chkalovets merged with Olimpik Novosibirsk, keeping their place in the Second League, and the team named Chkalovets-1936 entered the amateur league (KFK). According to Sibir and independent sources , it is Chkalovets-1936 that inherits the history of the Soviet club.

Chkalovets-1936 were promoted to the Second League after the 2000 season, and in 2004 they won promotion to the First Division. They changed their name as Sibir in 2006 and promoted to Russian Premier League once after finishing First League as 2nd in 2009.

On 16 May 2010, Sibir lost in the Russian Cup 2009–10 final against Zenit 0–1, but as Zenit qualified for the Champions League, Sibir gained the right to compete in the Europa League in 2010–11, for the first time in their history, making them the easternmost team to compete in a European competition.

On 19 August 2010, Sibir unexpectedly beat PSV Eindhoven in a home game of Europa League play-off round, 1–0, with a goal in stoppage time. However, the team was eliminated a week later following a 0–5 defeat in Eindhoven.

At the end of the 2018–19 season, the club was relegated to the third-tier Russian Professional Football League. Following the relegation, the club did not apply for the professional license and another club called FC Novosibirsk was organized to represent the city. On 27 June 2024, FC Novosibirsk announced the club is renamed to FC Sibir Novosibirsk.

== Club honours ==
- Russian Cup
  - Runners-up (1): 2009–10

== League history ==
=== Russia ===
Season	Div.	Pos.	Pl.	W	D	L	GS	GA	P	Cup	Europe		Top scorer (League)	Head Coach
1992	2nd, "East"	4	30	15	6	9	48	38	36				(Russia) Kovalyov – 11	(Russia) Yerkovich
1993	2nd, "East"	14	30	8	7	15	39	43	23	R256			(Russia) Nikulin – 9	(Russia) Yerkovich
1994	3rd, "Siberia"	1	22	16	3	3	51	12	35	R256			(Russia) Nikulin – 12	(Russia) Shevchenko
1995	2nd	11	42	19	4	19	58	65	61	R32			(Russia) Galkin – 14	(Russia) Shevchenko
1996	2nd	22	42	7	6	29	44	102	27	R64			(Russia) Pimenov – 10	(Russia) Shevchenko / (Russia) Zaburdaev
1997	3rd, "East"	6	34	16	8	10	46	32	56	R64			(Russia) Obgolts – 9	(Russia) Yerkovich
1998	3rd, "East"	2	30	16	12	2	41	17	60	R512			(Russia) Nikulin – 9	(Russia) Iromashvili
1999	3rd, "East"	5	30	16	6	8	60	42	54	R32			(Russia) Lidrik – 17	(Russia) Iromashvili
2000	LFL(4th), "Siberia"	1	16	15	1	0	65	6	46	R1024				(Russia) Iromashvili
2001	3rd, "East"	5	28	12	11	5	36	21	47				(Russia) Lidrik – 11	(Russia) Iromashvili
2002	3rd, "East"	2	30	19	6	5	61	28	63	R256			(Russia) Ragoza – 17	(Russia) Iromashvili / (Russia) Yerkovich
2003	3rd, "East"	6	24	11	7	6	38	27	40	R32			(Russia) Shtyn – 8	(Russia) Yerkovich / (Russia) Shmarov
2004	3rd, "East"	1	27	19	5	3	53	19	62	R256			(Russia) Akimov – 24	(Russia) Puzanov
2005	2nd	10	42	15	11	16	51	53	56	R512			(Russia) Akimov – 18	(Russia) Puzanov / (Russia) Davydov
2006	2nd	7	42	19	8	15	67	45	65	R64			(Russia) Akimov – 23	(Russia) Davydov / (Russia) Radyukin
2007	2nd	3	42	25	11	6	80	39	86	R16			(Russia) Akimov – 34	(Russia) Fayzulin
2008	2nd	14	42	14	16	12	51	41	58	R4			(Russia) Akimov – 12	(Russia) Oborin
2009	2nd	2	38	22	7	9	60	21	73	F			(Russia) Medvedev – 18	(Belarus) Kriushenko
2010	1st	16	30	4	8	18	34	58	20	R8	EU	PO	(Russia) Medvedev – 6	(Belarus) Kriushenko
2011–12	2nd	7	52	19	19	14	76	57	76	R32			(Russia) Akimov – 20	(Belarus) Kriushenko / (Russia) Radyukin / (Scotland) Miller / (Poland) Kubicki
2012–13	2nd	8	32	12	9	11	34	38	45	R32			(Russia) Medvedev – 6	(Russia) Yuran / (Poland) Kubicki
2013–14	2nd	11	36	13	12	11	38	39	51	R32			(Russia) Markosov – 5	(Poland) Kubicki / (Russia) Balakhnin
2014–15	2nd	11	34	11	9	14	35	46	42	R16			(Russia) Svezhov – 7	(Russia) Balakhnin / (Russia) Gordeyev
2015–16	2nd	11	38	14	9	15	47	50	51	R32			(Russia) Zhitnev – 16	(Russia) Stukalov
2016–17	2nd	15	38	9	15	14	31	46	42	R4			(Moldova) Cebotaru – 9	(Russia) Perevertailo / (Russia) Kirsanov
2017–18	2nd	7	38	14	11	13	38	31	53	R32				
2018–19	2nd	18	38	8	13	17	28	45	37	R32				

== European campaigns ==
Season	Competition	Round	Opponent	Home	Away	Aggregate
2010–11	UEFA Europa League	3Q	(Cyprus) Apollon Limassol	1–0	1–2	2–2
2010–11	UEFA Europa League	PO	(Netherlands) PSV Eindhoven	1–0	0–5	1–5

== Reserve squad ==
FC Sibir reserve team, FC Sibir-2 Novosibirsk, played in Russian Second Division (East Zone) in 2008, and then once again from 2011 until 2015–16, and yet again from the 2018–19 season.
