= FC Energiya Chaykovsky =

Russian football club

- Full name: Football Club Energiya Chaykovsky
- Founded: 1992
- League: Perm Krai Championship

FC Energiya Chaykovsky (Russian: «Энергия» (Чайковский)) is a Russian football team from Chaykovsky. It played professionally from 1992 to 2002. Its best result was fourth place in the Russian Second Division (Zone Center in 1997 and Zone Ural in 1998). Since 2009, it plays in the lower level amateur league.
