= FC Dynamo Perm =

- Full name: Football Club Dynamo Perm
- Founded: 1946
- Dissolved: 2003
- League: Russian Second Division, Zone Ural
- 2002: 15th

FC Dynamo Perm (Russian: «Динамо» (Пермь)) was a Russian football team from Perm. It played professionally in 1946 and from 1993 to 2002. Their best result was 3rd place in Zone Ural in the Soviet Second League in 1946.

== Team name history ==
- 1946: FC Dynamo Molotov (Perm was called Molotov at the time)
- 1993–2002: FC Dynamo Perm
