= FC Volga-d Ulyanovsk =

Russian football club

- Full name: Football Club Volga-d Ulyanovsk
- Founded: 1994
- League: Amateur Football League, Zone Privolzhye
- 2009: 13th

FC Volga-d Ulyanovsk (Russian: «Волга-д» (Ульяновск)) is a Russian football team from Ulyanovsk that currently plays in the Amateur Football League. It played professionally from 1997 to 1999. Their best result was 10th place in the Russian Second Division Zone Povolzhye in 1999. It is a farm club of FC Volga Ulyanovsk.

== Team name and location history ==
- 1994–1999: FC Energiya Ulyanovsk
- 2000: FC Lada-Energiya Ulyanovsk (was the farm club of FC Lada-Energiya Dimitrovgrad in 2000 and 2001)
- 2001: FC Lada-Energiya-2 Dimitrovgrad
- 2002–2006: FC Energiya Ulyanovsk
- 2007: FC Volga-Energiya Ulyanovsk (became the farm club of FC Volga Ulyanovsk beginning from this season)
- 2008: FC Volga-d-Energiya Ulyanovsk
- 2009–present: FC Volga-d Ulyanovsk
