= FC Yugra Nizhnevartovsk =

- Full name: Football Club Yugra Nizhnevartovsk
- Founded: 1994
- Dissolved: 2005
- League: Amateur Football League, Zone Ural
- 2004: 8th

FC Yugra Nizhnevartovsk (Russian: «Югра» (Нижневартовск)) was a Russian football team from Nizhnevartovsk. It played professionally from 1994 to 1999. Their best result was 2nd place in Zone East of the Russian Second Division in 1997.

== Team name history ==
- 1994–1999 FC Samotlor-XXI Nizhnevartovsk
- 2002–2004 FC Yugra Nizhnevartovsk
