= FC Spartak Yoshkar-Ola =

Russian football club

- Full name: Football Club Spartak Yoshkar-Ola
- Founded: 1962
- Chairman: Gennadi Belousov
- Manager: Aleksandr Nenashkin
- League: Russian Amateur Football League
- 2014–15: PFL, Zone Ural-Povolzhye, 11th (relegated)

FC Spartak Yoshkar-Ola (Russian: ФК «Спартак» Йошкар‑Ола) is a Russian football team from Yoshkar-Ola. It played professionally from 1962 to 1998, from 2000 to 2003 and again from 2012/13 season to 2014/15. It played at the second-highest level (Soviet First League and Russian First Division) in 1962, 1968–1969 and 1992–1993. It was called Trud Yoshkar-Ola (1962) and Druzhba Yoshkar-Ola (1975–1998).

In 2012/13 season the team returned to the Russian Second Division. In 2011/12 season Spartak Yoshkar-Ola won Privolzhye zone tournament of the Russian amateur championship.
