= FC Volga Ulyanovsk =

Russian football club

Volga
- Full name: ANO Football Club Volga
- Founded: 1947; 79 years ago
- Ground: Trud
- Capacity: 15,000
- Chairman: Mikhail Navolokin
- Manager: Aleksandr Grishchenko
- League: Russian First League
- 2025–26: 14th of 18
- Website: www.fcvu.ru
Home colours	Away colours

FC Volga Ulyanovsk (Russian: ФК «Во́лга» Улья́новск) is a professional association football club based in Ulyanovsk, Russia. It plays in the second-tier Russian First League.

Their reserve team FC Volga-d Ulyanovsk used to play professionally as FC Energiya Ulyanovsk.

== History ==
In 2008, they were relegated to the Russian Second Division 2009 after they finished 17th in Russian First Division. In December 2008, Volga signed a partnership agreement with Floriana FC of Malta, the most successful club in Maltese football.

On 4 June 2022, the last day of the 2021–22 season, Volga secured the first place in their FNL2 group and promotion for the 2022–23 season to the second-tier FNL while under the leadership of Rinat Aitov. Volga was relegated after one season in the second tier.

On 8 June 2025, Volga secured promotion to the Russian First League.

== Club name and location history ==
- 1947–1957: FC Torpedo Ulyanovsk
- 1958: FC Dynamo Ulyanovsk
- 1959–1961: FC Spartak Ulyanovsk
- 1961–1985: FC Volga Ulyanovsk
- 1986–1991: FC Start Ulyanovsk
- 1992–1995: FC Tekstilshchik Isheyevka
- 1996–2005: FC Volga Ulyanovsk
- 2006: FC Volga-Energiya Ulyanovsk (the reserves team currently known as FC Volga-d Ulyanovsk played as FC Volga-Energiya Ulyanovsk in the Amateur Football League in 2007)
- 2007–present: FC Volga Ulyanovsk

== Current squad ==
As of 11 September 2026, according to the official First League website.

Note: Flags indicate national team as defined under FIFA eligibility rules; some limited exceptions apply. Players may hold more than one non-FIFA nationality.

No.	Pos.	Nation	Player
1	GK	RUS	Rinat Shakerov
3	DF	RUS	Oleg Krasilnichenko
4	DF	RUS	Kamil Ibragimov
5	DF	RUS	Danil Stepanov
7	MF	RUS	Andrey Nikitin
8	MF	RUS	Denis Rakhmanov (captain)
9	MF	RUS	Kirill Folmer
10	MF	RUS	Ruslan Shagiakhmetov
11	FW	RUS	Astemir Khashkulov
14	FW	RUS	Vladislav Yakovlev
15	DF	RUS	Devid Kokoyev
16	GK	RUS	Sultan Kurtyakov
17	MF	RUS	Igor Gershun
20	DF	RUS	Konstantin Kovalyov

No.	Pos.	Nation	Player
22	MF	RUS	Dmitry Rakhmanov
23	GK	RUS	Yegor Baburin
28	MF	RUS	Danil Novikov
30	DF	RUS	Aydar Khabibullin
31	DF	RUS	Sergey Ustimov
50	DF	RUS	Artyom Bykov
55	MF	RUS	Aleksandr Saplinov
60	MF	RUS	Ignat Kasyanov
76	MF	RUS	Vadim Livadnov
77	MF	RUS	Luka Bagateliya
84	DF	RUS	Artyom Gutsa
88	DF	RUS	Maks Dziov (on loan from Fakel Voronezh)
95	GK	RUS	Andrey Khodanovich (on loan from Orenburg)
99	DF	RUS	Andrey Kostin

== Notable players ==
These players had international caps for their respective countries. Players whose name is listed in bold represented their countries while playing for Volga.

Russia

- (Russia) Tamerlan Musayev
- (Russia) Dmitry Yefremov

Europe

- (Armenia) Alex
- (Armenia) Aram Hakobyan
- (Belarus) Andrey Klimovich
- (Moldova) Victor Berco
- (Moldova) Anatolie Doroș

Asia

- (Tajikistan) **Rustam Khaidaraliyev**
