= FC Sibiryak Bratsk =

- Full name: Football Club Sibiryak Bratsk
- Founded: 1967
- Dissolved: 2014
- Ground: Metallurg Stadium
- Capacity: 8,000
- 2013–14: Russian Professional Football League, Zone East, 9th (relegated)
| Home colours | Away colours |

FC Sibiryak Bratsk (Russian: ФК «Сибиряк» Братск) was a Russian football club from Bratsk, founded in 1967 and dissolved in 2014. It played professionally in 1967–1970, 1972–1973, 1976–1978 and from 1998 to 2013/14. Second Division is the highest level they ever achieved. The club was called Pursey Bratsk (1967–1969), Energiya Bratsk (1976–1995) and Lesokhimik Bratsk (1996).
