= 2000 Russian Second Division =

Football competition

Russian Second Division
- Season: 2000

The 2000 Russian Second Division was the ninth edition of the Russian Second Division. There were 6 zones with 107 teams starting the competition (one was excluded before the end of the season).

== Zone West ==
=== Overview ===
Team	Head coach
FC Severstal Cherepovets	Boris Rappoport
FC Dynamo Vologda	Vladimir Yulygin
FC Pskov	(Belarus) Eduard Malofeyev (until August); Aleksandr Lebedev (from August)
FC Spartak Shchyolkovo	Aleksandr Ignatenko (until June); Yevgeni Sidorov (from June)
FC Mosenergo Moscow	Valentin Sysoyev
FC Torpedo-2 Moscow	Sergei Petrenko
FC Volochanin-89 Vyshny Volochyok	Viktor Demidov
FC Neftyanik Yaroslavl	
FC Zenit-2 St. Petersburg	
FC Avtomobilist Noginsk	Igor Volchok
FC Sportakademklub Moscow	Sergei Abramov
FC Lokomotiv-2 Moscow	Andrei Syomin
PFC CSKA-2 Moscow	
FC Oazis Yartsevo	Leonid Arkhipov (until August); Ivan Burlaku (from August)
FC Spartak-2 Moscow	Nikolay Kiselyov (until May)
FC Spartak Kostroma	Nikolai Semykin (until May); Aleksei Yarovoy (June); Viktor Nozdrin (from July)
FC Dynamo-2 Moscow	Leonid Ablizin
FC Saturn-d Ramenskoye	
FC Energiya Velikiye Luki	Vladimir Kosogov (until July); Vladimir Tsvetkov (from July)

=== Standings ===
Pos	Team	Pld	W	D	L	GF	GA	GD	Pts	Qualification or relegation
1	Severstal Cherepovets (Note: FC Severstal Cherepovets and FC Pskov promoted from the Russian Amateur Football League.) (A)	36	19	12	5	58	33	+25	69 (Note: FC Severstal Cherepovets was awarded a 3-0 victory in an away game against FC Saturn-d Ramenskoye (after Severstal won the game 2-0) because Vitali Veselov was not eligible to play for Saturn-d after being sent off during the main FC Saturn Ramenskoye team game.)	Qualification to Promotion play-offs
2	Dynamo Vologda	36	19	10	7	53	30	+23	67	
3	Pskov	36	19	7	10	65	29	+36	64	
4	Spartak Shchyolkovo	36	19	7	10	48	31	+17	64	
5	Mosenergo Moscow	38	18	8	12	52	44	+8	62	
6	Torpedo-2 Moscow (R)	36	16	9	11	42	33	+9	57	Relegation to Amateur Football League (Note: FC Torpedo-2 Moscow, FC Zenit-2 St. Petersburg, FC Lokomotiv-2 Moscow, PFC CSKA-2 Moscow, FC Spartak-2 Moscow, FC Dynamo-2 Moscow and FC Saturn-d Ramenskoye moved to the newly reintroduced Russian Premier League reserves competition in 2001.)
7	Volochanin-89 Vyshny Volochyok (Note: FC Volochanin Vyshny Volochyok renamed to FC Volochanin-89.)	36	16	9	11	36	28	+8	57	
8	Neftyanik Yaroslavl	36	14	10	12	39	35	+4	52	
9	Zenit-2 St. Petersburg (R)	36	13	11	12	50	41	+9	50	Relegation to Amateur Football League
10	Avtomobilist Noginsk	36	13	9	14	35	34	+1	48	
11	Sportakademklub Moscow	36	13	9	14	38	53	−15	48	
12	Lokomotiv-2 Moscow (R)	36	12	9	15	40	45	−5	45 (Note: FC Spartak-2 Moscow was awarded a 3-0 victory in an away game against FC Lokomotiv-2 Moscow (after Spartak-2 lost the game 0-2) because Igor Cherevchenko was not eligible to play for Lokomotiv-2 after being sent off during the main FC Lokomotiv Moscow team game.)	Relegation to Amateur Football League
13	CSKA-2 Moscow (R)	36	11	10	15	43	46	−3	43	Relegation to Amateur Football League
14	Oazis Yartsevo	36	9	14	13	35	40	−5	41	
15	Spartak-2 Moscow (R)	36	9	10	17	35	55	−20	37	Relegation to Amateur Football League
16	Spartak Kostroma	36	9	10	17	33	60	−27	37	
17	Dynamo-2 Moscow (R)	36	9	8	19	46	65	−19	35	Relegation to Amateur Football League
18	Saturn-d Ramenskoye (R)	36	9	5	22	35	59	−24	32	Relegation to Amateur Football League
19	Energiya Velikiye Luki	36	9	5	22	23	55	−32	32	

Source: RSSSF
(A) Advance to a further round; (R) Relegated

=== Top goalscorers ===
22 goals

- Dmitri Sachkov (FC Pskov)

19 goals

- Aleksandr Rogulin (FC Oazis Yartsevo)

15 goals

- Sergei Stepanov (FC Pskov)

13 goals

- Andrei Nikolayev (FC Severstal Cherepovets)
- Dmitri Podshivalov (FC Dynamo-2 Moscow)

12 goals

- Sergei Matveyev (FC Sportakademklub Moscow)
- Aleksandr Samorodov (FC Mosenergo Moscow)

11 goals

- Dmitri Akimov (FC Zenit-2 St. Petersburg)
- Dmitri Kalinin (FC Spartak Shchyolkovo)
- Dmitri Rudanov (FC Neftyanik Yaroslavl)

== Zone Centre ==
=== Overview ===
Team	Head coach
FC Khimki	Aleksandr Piskaryov (until May), Viktor Papayev (from May)
FC Dynamo Bryansk	Igor Belanovich (until June), Viktor Zimin (June to July), Valeri Korneyev (from July)
FC Oryol	Vitali Koberskiy
FC Spartak Tambov	Vladimir Kovylin
FC Lotto-MKM Moscow	Yuri Bykov
FC Krasnoznamensk	Vladimir Bondarenko, Aleksandr Gretsky
FC Kosmos Elektrostal	Aleksandr Logunov
FC Avangard Kursk	Aleksandr Galkin
FC Spartak-Telekom Shuya	Aleksandr Saitov, Vladimir Belkov
FC Lokomotiv Kaluga	Aleksandr Sakharov
FC Lokomotiv Liski	Aleksandr Minayev (until May), Anatoli Bulgakov (from May)
FC Kolomna	Vladimir Ushakov
FC Ryazan-Agrokomplekt Ryazan	Sergei Ponomaryov
FC Spartak-Orekhovo Orekhovo-Zuyevo	Anatoli Kuznetsov, Viktor Rodionov, Vadim Khnykin
FC Yelets	Nikolai Volkov
FC Don Novomoskovsk	Aleksandr Arkhipov
FC Fabus Bronnitsy	Aleksandr Bubnov (until June), Vladimir Mukhanov (from June)
FC Titan Reutov	Nikolai Pushkaryov, Ravil Sabitov
FC Spartak Lukhovitsy	Aleksandr Yegorov, Vadim Khnykin
FC Arsenal-2 Tula	Vyacheslav Ledovskikh (until June), Anatoli Semyonov (June to July), Aleksandr Chimbiryov (from July)

=== Standings ===
Pos	Team	Pld	W	D	L	GF	GA	GD	Pts	Qualification
1	Khimki (A)	38	28	4	6	68	22	+46	88	Qualification to Promotion play-offs
2	Dynamo Bryansk	38	26	8	4	60	23	+37	86	
3	Oryol	38	24	5	9	57	31	+26	77	
4	Spartak Tambov	38	19	8	11	49	31	+18	65	
5	Lotto-MKM Moscow (Note: FC Lotto-MKM Moscow was called FC Moskabelmet Moscow in 1999 and did not participate in any national-level competitions in that year.)	38	18	8	12	48	33	+15	62	
6	Krasnoznamensk (Note: FC Krasnoznamensk promoted from the Russian Amateur Football League where it played as FC Krasnoznamensk-Selyatino Krasnoznamensk in 1999.)	38	18	6	14	42	32	+10	60 (Note: FC Krasnoznamensk was awarded a 3-0 victory in their home game against FC Yelets that Krasnoznamensk won 1-0 as Yelets fielded an ineligible player.)	
7	Kosmos Elektrostal	38	13	16	9	41	27	+14	55	
8	Avangard Kursk	38	16	6	16	36	41	−5	54	
9	Spartak-Telekom Shuya	38	14	12	12	38	30	+8	54	
10	Lokomotiv Kaluga	38	14	9	15	41	39	+2	51	
11	Lokomotiv Liski	38	11	13	14	33	40	−7	46	
12	Kolomna	38	12	9	17	36	63	−27	45	
13	Ryazan-Agrokomplekt Ryazan (Note: FC Spartak Ryazan renamed to FC Ryazan-Agrokomplekt Ryazan in October.)	38	11	10	17	25	35	−10	43	
14	Spartak-Orekhovo Orekhovo-Zuyevo	38	11	10	17	34	46	−12	43	
15	Yelets (Note: FC Yelets promoted from the Russian Amateur Football League.)	38	12	6	20	25	44	−19	42	
16	Don Novomoskovsk	28	9	5	14	27	38	−11	32	
17	Fabus Bronnitsy	38	10	11	17	35	50	−15	41	
18	Titan Reutov (Note: FC Titan Zheleznodorozhny moved to Reutov.)	38	11	6	21	34	46	−12	39	
19	Spartak Lukhovitsy	38	7	13	18	23	44	−21	34	
20	Arsenal-2 Tula	38	5	7	26	28	65	−37	22	

Source: RSSSF
(A) Advance to a further round

=== Top goalscorers ===
18 goals

- Konstantin Genich (FC Khimki)

16 goals

- Nikolai Kovardayev (FC Khimki)
- Aleksandr Seredokhin (FC Lokomotiv Kaluga)
- Ruslan Usikov (FC Dynamo Bryansk)

15 goals

- Aleksei Kopilov (FC Oryol)

13 goals

- Sergei Kravchuk (FC Khimki)

12 goals

- Andrei Boldin (FC Kolomna)
- Vitali Milenin (FC Spartak Tambov)

11 goals

- Dmitri Pinin (FC Spartak-Orekhovo Orekhovo-Zuyevo)
- Andrei Cherenkov (FC Krasnoznamensk)

== Zone South ==
=== Overview ===
Team	Head coach
FC Kuban Krasnodar	Soferbi Yeshugov
FC SKA Rostov-on-Don	Aleksandr Tumasyan
FC Kavkazkabel Prokhladny	Sergei Razaryonov
FC Avtodor Vladikavkaz	Yuri Gazzaev
FC Druzhba Maykop	Adam Natkho
FC Angusht Nazran	Timur Kuriyev (until July); Umar Markhiyev (from August)
FC Vityaz Krymsk	Kalin Stepanyan
FC Lokomotiv-Taym Mineralnye Vody	Aleksandr Ikayev (until April); Yuri Dukhovnov (April to August); Aleksandr Babayan (from August)
FC Rostselmash-2 Rostov-on-Don	
FC Dynamo Makhachkala	Magomed Isayev
FC Mozdok	Vladimir Arkalov
FC Slavyansk Slavyansk-na-Kubani	Vladimir Sinyagovsky
FC Shakhtyor Shakhty	Valeri Dzolov
FC Zhemchuzhina-2 Sochi	Anatoli Lyz
FC Venets Gulkevichi	Vasili Sidorenko
FC Nart Nartkala	Vladimir Kurashinov
FC Iriston Vladikavkaz	Ruslan Merdenov
FC Torpedo Taganrog	Anatoli Shabanov
FC Beshtau Lermontov	Sergei Shestakov, Viktor Vashchenko
FC Torpedo Georgiyevsk	Aleksandr Ivanchenko

=== Standings ===
Pos	Team	Pld	W	D	L	GF	GA	GD	Pts	Qualification or relegation
1	Kuban Krasnodar (A)	38	32	3	3	95	13	+82	99	Qualification to Promotion play-offs
2	SKA Rostov-on-Don	38	32	2	4	104	16	+88	98	
3	Angusht Nazran	38	29	2	7	80	30	+50	89	
4	Druzhba Maykop	38	27	2	9	89	27	+62	83	
5	Dynamo Stavropol	38	26	4	8	68	24	+44	82 (Note: FC Dynamo Stavropol was awarded a 3-0 victory in their home game against FC Nart Nartkala that Dynamo won 1-0 as Nart fielded an ineligible player.)	
6	Avtodor Vladikavkaz	38	22	7	9	83	30	+53	73	
7	Spartak-Kavkaztransgaz Izobilny (Note: FC Spartak-Kavkaztransgaz Izobilny promoted from the Amateur Football League, where it played in 1999 as FC Signal Izobilny.)	38	20	7	11	52	35	+17	67	
8	Kavkazkabel Prokhladny	38	18	8	12	54	34	+20	62	
9	Nart Nartkala	38	19	4	15	55	57	−2	61	
10	Vityaz Krymsk	38	15	6	17	46	62	−16	51	
11	Sudostroitel Astrakhan (Note: FC Sudostroitel Astrakhan promoted from the Amateur Football League.)	38	14	8	16	48	53	−5	50	
12	Venets Gulkevichi	38	11	6	21	32	78	−46	39	
13	Mozdok	38	9	8	21	42	57	−15	35	
14	Dynamo Makhachkala	38	10	3	25	41	68	−27	33	
15	Rostselmash-2 Rostov-on-Don (Note: FC Rostselmash-2 Rostov-on-Don moved to the newly reintroduced Russian Premier League reserves competition in 2001.) (R)	38	10	3	25	36	79	−43	33	Relegation to Amateur Football League
16	Shakhtyor Shakhty	38	9	6	23	26	71	−45	33	
17	Slavyansk Slavyansk-na-Kubani	38	9	5	24	33	67	−34	32	
18	Iriston Vladikavkaz (Note: FC Iriston Vladikavkaz did not participate in any national-level competition in 2001.) (R)	38	9	4	25	30	90	−60	31	Relegation to Amateur Football League
19	Chernomorets-d Novorossiysk (Note: FC Chernomorets-d Novorossiysk included in the league without participating in national-level competitions in 1999. They moved to the newly reintroduced Russian Premier League reserves competition in 2001.) (R)	38	8	6	24	44	76	−32	30	Relegation to Amateur Football League
20	Torpedo Taganrog (R)	38	2	4	32	23	113	−90	10	Relegation to Amateur Football League

Source: RSSSF
(A) Advance to a further round; (R) Relegated

=== Top goalscorers ===
30 goals

- Yusup Guguyev (FC Angush Nazran)

26 goals

- Stanislav Lebedintsev (FC SKA Rostov-on-Don)
- Isa Markhiyev (FC Angush Nazran)

20 goals

- Nikolai Komlichenko (FC Druzhba Maykop)

18 goals

- Konstantin Boyko (FC SKA Rostov-on-Don)
- Sergey Zelikov (FC SKA Rostov-on-Don)

17 goals

- Aleksandr Bocharnikov (FC Sudostroitel Astrakhan)

16 goals

- Andrey Perederiy (FC Avtodor Vladikavkaz)

15 goals

- Eduard Bogdanov (FC Dynamo Stavropol)
- Vitali Makarenko (FC Kavkazkabel Prokhladny)
- Musa Mazayaev (FC Druzhba Maykop)
- Anzor Mizov (FC Nart Nartkala)

== Zone Povolzhye ==
=== Overview ===
Team	Head coach
FC Svetotekhnika Saransk	Aleksandr Khomutetskiy
FC Torpedo Pavlovo	Aleksandr Sarafannikov
FC Volga Ulyanovsk	Sergei Sedyshev
FC Metallurg Vyksa	Yevgeni Popov
FC Balakovo	Gennadi Drozdov
FC Torpedo-Viktoriya Nizhny Novgorod	Anatoli Nefyodov
FC Energetik Uren	Viktor Pavlyukov
FC Iskra Engels	Yuri Vasilyev
FC Lada-Energiya Dimitrovgrad	Andrei Flaat
FC Olimpiya Volgograd	
FC Diana Volzhsk	Valeri Bogdanov
FC Biokhimik-Mordovia Saransk	Igor Shinkarenko
FC Khimik Dzerzhinsk	Valeri Volodin
FC Rotor-2 Volgograd	
FC Khopyor Balashov	
FC Torpedo Volzhsky	Oleg Dudarin, Anatoli Kurbatov, Valeri Chupin, Viktor Ionov
FC Krylya Sovetov-2 Samara	
FC Salyut Saratov	Vladimir Khoroltsev

=== Standings ===
Pos	Team	Pld	W	D	L	GF	GA	GD	Pts	Qualification or relegation
1	Svetotekhnika Saransk (A)	34	27	2	5	62	32	+30	83	Qualification to Promotion play-offs
2	Torpedo Pavlovo	34	22	6	6	56	25	+31	72	
3	Volga Ulyanovsk	34	22	4	8	61	29	+32	70	
4	Metallurg Vyksa	34	21	5	8	50	28	+22	68	
5	Balakovo	34	19	3	12	51	34	+17	60	
6	Torpedo-Viktoriya Nizhny Novgorod	34	17	7	10	56	33	+23	58	
7	Energetik Uren	34	17	4	13	55	32	+23	55	
8	Iskra Engels	34	15	6	13	47	45	+2	51	
9	Lada-Energiya Dimitrovgrad (Note: FC Lada-Simbirsk Dimitrovgrad renamed to Lada-Energiya.)	34	16	1	17	54	49	+5	49	
10	Olimpiya Volgograd (Note: FC Olimpiya Volgograd and FC Khopyor Balashov promoted from the Amateur Football League.)	34	13	7	14	61	56	+5	46	
11	Diana Volzhsk	34	14	3	17	50	38	+12	45	
12	Biokhimik-Mordovia Saransk	34	13	5	16	38	45	−7	44	
13	Khimik Dzerzhinsk	34	11	4	19	38	46	−8	37	
14	Rotor-2 Volgograd (R)	34	10	5	19	61	74	−13	35	Relegation to Amateur Football League
15	Khopyor Balashov	34	9	6	19	24	51	−27	33	
16	Torpedo Volzhsky	34	8	3	23	30	77	−47	27	
17	Krylya Sovetov-2 Samara (Note: FC Krylya Sovetov-2 Samara was admitted into the division without participating in any national-level competitions in 1999. They moved to the newly reintroduced Russian Premier League reserves competition in 2001.) (R)	34	6	4	24	25	80	−55	22	Relegation to Amateur Football League
18	Salyut Saratov	34	4	9	21	27	72	−45	21	

Source: RSSSF
(A) Advance to a further round; (R) Relegated

=== Top goalscorers ===
26 goals

- Anton Khazov (FC Torpedo-Viktoriya Nizhny Novgorod)

23 goals

- Maksim Bondarenko (FC Rotor-2 Volgograd)

20 goals

- Vladimir Pronin (FC Volga Ulyanovsk)

19 goals

- Anatoli Lychagov (FC Energetik Uren)

14 goals

- Dmitri Golubev (FC Metallurg Vyksa)

13 goals

- Vitali Nikulkin (FC Svetotekhnika Saransk)
- Dmitri Timofeyev (FC Diana Volzhsk)

12 goals

- Aleksandr Fyodorov (FC Diana Volzhsk)

11 goals

- Eduard Bazarov (FC Balakovo)
- Andrei Chibrikov (FC Torpedo Pavlovo)
- Denis Snimshchikov (FC Olimpiya Volgograd)

== Zone Ural ==
=== Overview ===
Team	Head coach
FC Neftekhimik Nizhnekamsk	Ivan Butaliy
FC Uralmash Yekaterinburg	Nikolai Agafonov
FC KAMAZ-Chally Naberezhnye Chelny	Pyotr Shubin
FC Tyumen	Viktor Knyazhev (until July); Rudolf Atamalyan (from July)
FC Sodovik Sterlitamak	Sergei Maksimov
FC Metallurg-Metiznik Magnitogorsk	Aleksandr Kukushkin
FC Zenit Chelyabinsk	Oleg Kudelin, Rafail Fazylov
FC Uralets Nizhny Tagil	Lev Kutashov
FC Gazovik Orenburg	Aleksandr Korolyov
FC UralAZ Miass	Pyotr Nagayev, Valeri Znarok
FC Dynamo Perm	Andrei Boglayevskiy
FC Energiya Chaikovsky	Sergei Kleymyonov
FC Dynamo-Mashinostroitel Kirov	Vasili Esaulov, Aleksandr Kishinevsky
FC Dynamo Izhevsk	Stanislav Korotayev
FC Spartak Yoshkar-Ola	Aleksandr Yerastov, Viktor Zvyagin, Igor Pochuyenkov, Aleksandr Rasputin
FC Spartak Kurgan	Ivan Gerasimov

=== Standings ===
Pos	Team	Pld	W	D	L	GF	GA	GD	Pts	Qualification
1	Neftekhimik Nizhnekamsk (A)	30	26	4	0	82	18	+64	82	Qualification to Promotion play-offs
2	Uralmash Yekaterinburg	30	23	4	3	72	21	+51	73	
3	KAMAZ-Chally Naberezhnye Chelny	30	20	4	6	80	23	+57	64	
4	Tyumen	30	16	9	5	53	25	+28	57	
5	Sodovik Sterlitamak	30	16	5	9	46	25	+21	53	
6	Metallurg-Metiznik Magnitogorsk	30	16	5	9	50	39	+11	53	
7	Zenit Chelyabinsk	30	14	4	12	50	47	+3	46	
8	Uralets Nizhny Tagil	30	14	3	13	44	47	−3	45	
9	Gazovik Orenburg	30	14	2	14	38	42	−4	44	
10	UralAZ Miass	30	11	6	13	26	39	−13	39	
11	Dynamo Perm	30	8	5	17	30	59	−29	29	
12	Energiya Chaikovsky	30	8	3	19	34	57	−23	27	
13	Dynamo-Mashinostroitel Kirov (Note: FC Dynamo-Mashinostroitel Kirov moved from Zone Povolzhye to Zone Ural.)	30	6	7	17	24	58	−34	25	
14	Dynamo Izhevsk	30	6	3	21	29	66	−37	21	
15	Spartak Yoshkar-Ola (Note: FC Spartak Yoshkar-Ola promoted from the Amateur Football League.)	30	3	4	23	19	63	−44	13	
16	Spartak Kurgan (Note: FC Kurgan renamed to FC Spartak Kurgan.)	30	3	4	23	24	72	−48	13	

Source: RSSSF
(A) Advance to a further round

=== Top goalscorers ===
36 goals

- Igor Palachyov (FC Uralmash Yekaterinburg)

21 goals

- Rustyam Fakhrutdinov (FC Neftekhimik Nizhnekamsk)

20 goals

- Roman Strizhov (FC KAMAZ-Chally Naberezhnye Chelny)

18 goals

- Vladimir Dzhubanov (FC KAMAZ-Chally Naberezhnye Chelny)

17 goals

- Vitali Kakunin (FC Neftekhimik Nizhnekamsk)
- Mikhail Tyufyakov (FC Neftekhimik Nizhnekamsk)

16 goals

- Vladimir Raykov (FC Zenit Chelyabinsk)

14 goals

- Sergei Polstyanov (FC Tyumen)

13 goals

- Andrei Frolov (FC Tyumen)

12 goals

- Stanislav Filonov (FC Metallurg-Metiznik Magnitogorsk)
- Maksim Kovalyov (FC Uralets Nizhny Tagil)

== Zone East ==
=== Overview ===
Team	Head coach
FC Metallurg Novokuznetsk	Vladislav Sosnov (until August); Sergei Synovyat (from August)
FC SKA-Energiya Khabarovsk	(Ukraine) Oleh Smolyaninov
FC Zvezda Irkutsk	Sergei Muratov, Gennadi Vyazovtsev
FC Luch Vladivostok	Yuri Karamyan (until August); Boris Zhuravlyov (from August)
FC Okean Nakhodka	Vladimir Susin
FC Chkalovets-Olimpik Novosibirsk	Yuri Gavrilov
FC Irtysh Omsk	Sergei Vasyutin
FC Sibiryak Bratsk	Valeri Tolchev
FC Selenga Ulan-Ude	Valeri Mikhnov
FC Amur-Energiya Blagoveshchensk	Vyacheslav Kurtsayev
FC Dynamo Barnaul	Viktor Volynkin
FC Kuzbass Kemerovo	Sergei Rogalevskiy, Boris Rusanov
FC Dynamo Omsk	Anatoli Chikinskiy

=== Standings ===
Pos	Team	Pld	W	D	L	GF	GA	GD	Pts	Qualification
1	Metallurg Novokuznetsk (A)	24	17	4	3	42	15	+27	55	Qualification to Promotion play-offs
2	SKA-Khabarovsk	24	16	5	3	50	23	+27	53	
3	Zvezda Irkutsk	24	11	7	6	43	27	+16	40	
4	Luch Vladivostok	24	12	3	9	41	26	+15	39	
5	Okean Nakhodka	24	11	6	7	28	24	+4	39	
6	Chkalovets-Olimpik Novosibirsk (Note: FC Chkalovets-Olimpik Novosibirsk promoted from the Amateur Football League. The history of FC Chkalovets Novosibirsk that participated in the 1999 Second Division was technically inherited by FC Chkalovets-1936 Novosibirsk that entered Amateur Football League in 2000.)	24	10	6	8	31	29	+2	36	
7	Irtysh Omsk	24	8	9	7	20	18	+2	33	
8	Sibiryak Bratsk	24	9	5	10	34	30	+4	32	
9	Selenga Ulan-Ude	24	8	4	12	15	41	−26	28	
10	Amur-Energiya Blagoveshchensk	24	6	7	11	27	30	−3	25	
11	Dynamo Barnaul	24	6	4	14	25	37	−12	22	
12	Kuzbass Kemerovo	24	2	9	13	12	38	−26	15	
13	Dynamo Omsk	24	3	5	16	14	44	−30	14	
14	Reformatsiya Abakan (Note: FC Reformatsiya Abakan dropped out of the league after playing 9 games and gaining 7 points. They did not participate in any national-level competitions in 2001.)	9	-	-	-	-	-	—	7	

Source: RSSSF
(A) Advance to a further round

=== Top goalscorers ===
14 goals

- Aleksandr Popov (FC Zvezda Irkutsk)

13 goals

- Stanislav Chaplygin (FC Metallurg Novokuznetsk)
- Sergei Pervushin (FC SKA-Energiya Khabarovsk)

12 goals

- Anatoli Panchenko (FC Dynamo Barnaul)

10 goals

- Shamil Bagizayev (FC Sibiryak Bratsk)

9 goals

- Aleksandr Garin (FC Luch Vladivostok)
- Oleg Lidrik (FC Chkalovets-Olimpik Novosibirsk)
- Sergei Matochkin (FC Selenga Ulan-Ude)
- Aleksandr Tikhonkikh (FC Zvezda Irkutsk)

8 goals

- Aleksei Korobchenko (FC SKA-Energiya Khabarovsk)
- Aleksei Latushkin (FC Okean Nakhodka)
- Aleksei Poddubskiy (FC SKA-Energiya Khabarovsk)

== Promotion play-offs ==
21 October 2000

Neftekhimik Nizhnekamsk	2–0	Metallurg Novokuznetsk
Dyachenko 13'; Fakhrutdinov 60' (pen.)	Report

Neftekhimik Stadium, Nizhnekamsk
Attendance: 3,500
Referee: Yuri Chebotaryov (Krasnodar)
28 October 2000

Metallurg Novokuznetsk	1–2	Neftekhimik Nizhnekamsk
Medvedev 90' (pen.)	Report	Fakhrutdinov 4'; Kakunin 45'

Zapsibovets Stadium, Novokuznetsk
Attendance: 5,000
Referee: Yuri Baskakov (Moscow)

Neftekhimik won 4–1 on aggregate and was promoted to the 2001 Russian First Division.

29 October 2000

Severstal Cherepovets	1–0	FC Khimki
Bulavin 54'	Report

Saturn Stadium, Rybinsk
Attendance: 500
Referee: Sergei Gusev (Tobolsk)
3 November 1999

FC Khimki	3–2	Severstal Cherepovets
Kravchuk 20', 24'; Kocharygin 89'	Report	Rogozhin 43'; Strachkov 49'

Novator Stadium, Khimki
Attendance: 5,000
Referee: Sergei Zuyev (Moscow)

3–3 on aggregate, Severstal won on away goals rule and was promoted to the 2001 Russian First Division. However, Severstal could not find necessary financing in time and the spot was eventually given to Khimki instead.

1 November 2000

Svetotekhnika Saransk	0–1	Kuban Krasnodar
	Report	Pantyushenko 75'

Svetotekhnika Stadium, Saransk
Attendance: 16,000
Referee: Garyafi Zhafyarov (Moscow)
6 November 2000

Kuban Krasnodar	0–0	Svetotekhnika Saransk
	Report

Kuban Stadium, Krasnodar
Attendance: 20,000
Referee: Taras Bezubyak (St. Petersburg)

Kuban Krasnodar won 1–0 on aggregate and was promoted to the 2001 Russian First Division.

== See also ==
- 2000 Russian Top Division
- 2000 Russian First Division
