= Yevgeni Polovina =

Russian footballer

Personal information
- Full name: Yevgeni Nikolayevich Polovina
- Date of birth: 16 August 1979 (age 47)
- Height: 1.70 m (5 ft 7 in)
- Position: Forward

Senior career*
Years	Team	Apps	(Gls)
1999	FC Voskhod Starovelichkovskaya		
1999–2001	FC Chernomorets Novorossiysk	11	(0)
2000	→ FC Chernomorets-d Novorossiysk (loan)	19	(7)
2001	FC Voskhod Starovelichkovskaya		
2002–2003	FC Slavyansk Slavyansk-na-Kubani		
2004	FC Kolos Timashyovsk		
2006	FC Sochi-04 Sochi	29	(1)
2007–2012	FC GNS-Spartak Krasnodar		
- * Club domestic league appearances and goals

Yevgeni Nikolayevich Polovina (Russian: Евгений Николаевич Половина; born 16 August 1979) is a former Russian football player.
