= Konstantin Kovalenko =

Footballer from Belarus

Personal information
- Full name: Konstantin Valeryevich Kovalenko
- Date of birth: 2 February 1975 (age 51)
- Place of birth: Rahachow, Belarusian SSR
- Height: 1.75 m (5 ft 9 in)
- Position: Midfielder

Senior career*
Years	Team	Apps	(Gls)
1991	Kuban Barannikovsky	7	(1)
1992	Torpedo Armavir	5	(3)
1993–1995	Kolos Krasnodar	99	(39)
1995–1996	Kremin Kremenchuk	10	(1)
1996	Spartak Moscow	2	(1)
1997	Kuban Krasnodar	20	(8)
1997	Zhemchuzhina Sochi	10	(1)
1998	Metallurg Lipetsk	10	(2)
1998	Zhemchuzhina Sochi	13	(3)
1999	Alania Vladikavkaz	3	(0)
1999	Zhemchuzhina Sochi	15	(5)
2000	Chernomorets Novorossiysk	18	(9)
2001	Kuban Krasnodar	11	(2)
2002	Chernomorets Novorossiysk	11	(1)
2002	Saturn-RenTV Ramenskoye	2	(0)
2003	Spartak Nalchik	23	(3)
2004	Luch-Energiya Vladivostok	10	(0)
2005	Sochi-04	10	(1)
2005	Azovets Primorsko-Akhtarsk		
2006	GNS-Spartak Krasnodar		
2007	Azovets Primorsko-Akhtarsk		
2008	Sochi-04	10	(6)
2018	FC Kuban Krasnodar (amateur)		

International career
1995–1999	Belarus	2	(0)

Managerial career
- 2011: CPYuF Krasnodar
- * Club domestic league appearances and goals

Konstantin Valeryevich Kovalenko (Russian: Константин Валерьевич Коваленко; Belarusian: Канстанцін Валер'евіч Каваленка; born 2 February 1975) is a Belarusian and Russian former professional footballer. He also worked as a youth coach with FC Krasnodar in Russia.

== Career ==
He made his professional debut in the Soviet Second League in 1991 for FC Kuban Barannikovsky. He played 1 game in the 1996–97 UEFA Cup for FC Spartak Moscow.

His brother Andrei Kovalenko also played football professionally.

On 27 October 2008 he punched referee Sergei Timofeyev in the face in the Russian Second Division game FC Sochi-04 - FC Olimpia Volgograd. He was banned from football for a year.

== Honours ==
Spartak Moscow

- Russian Premier League champion: 1996.
