= Robert Zebelyan =

Armenian footballer (born 1984)

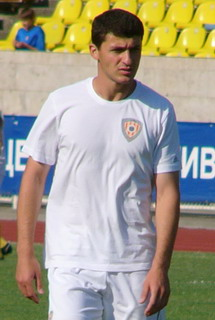
- Zebelyan in 2009

Personal information
- Date of birth: 31 March 1984 (age 42)
- Place of birth: Sochi, Soviet Union
- Height: 1.88 m (6 ft 2 in)
- Position: Forward

Senior career*
Years	Team	Apps	(Gls)
2002–2004	Zhemchuzhina Sochi	62	(9)
2005–2006	Sochi-04	22	(9)
2006–2007	Kuban Krasnodar	44	(23)
2007–2008	Khimki	10	(0)
2008	→ Baltika Kaliningrad (loan)	27	(3)
2009–2010	Zhemchuzhina Sochi	67	(26)
2011	Dinamo Minsk	9	(2)
2011	Tobol Kostanay	11	(2)
2013	Sochi		

International career
2006–2008	Armenia	7	(0)
- * Club domestic league appearances and goals

Robert Zebelyan (Armenian: Ռոբերտ Զեբելյան; born 31 March 1984) is an Armenian former professional footballer who played as a forward.

== Early life ==
Born in Sochi, Soviet Union, Zebelyan played different sports as a child, including tennis, before focusing more on football.

== Club career ==
=== Youth ===
As a youth player, Zebelyan joined the youth academy of Zhemchuzhina Sochi, before joining a sports boarding school in Krasnodar, where he stayed for over a year.

=== Senior ===
Zebelyan started his career with Zhemchuzhina Sochi, where he made sixty-two appearances and scored nine goals. His first stint for Zhemchuzhina Sochi was only a few years after the club's only spell in the Russian Premier League. After that, he signed for Sochi-04, where he suffered unpaid wages. In 2006, Zebelyan signed for Kuban Krasnodar with a contract expiring at the end of 2008. Zebelyan scored 23 goals for Kuban Krasnodar, becoming the club's top scorer that season and one of the top scorers of the league that season. However, during the 2007 season, he made significantly less appearances for Kuban Krasnodar due to the manager (Pavlo Yakovenko) trusting him less as the 2007 season began, even after he scored during preseason friendlies. Kuban Krasnodar were initially reluctant to let him play for the Armenia national team due to the congestion of fixtures in the Russian second tier but they eventually let represent Armenia internationally. During the middle of the 2000s, Zebelyan was considered a consistent goalscoring threat in the Russian second tier.

In 2007, he signed for Khimki, where he mainly appeared as a substitute. In 2008, Zebelyan signed for Baltika Kaliningrad, where he wore the number ninety-nine shirt, a number considered by some to be unusual for a footballer. That year, he suffered an injury which caused him to receive treatment. In 2009, he returned to Zhemchuzhina Sochi. Zebelyan dropped a division to return to Zhemchuzhina Sochi with the aim of resurrecting the club's fortunes, but the club dissolved a few seasons later.

Before the 2011 season, Zebelyan signed for Dinamo Minsk, where he failed to completely establish himself as a starting player. He scored his first goal for Dinamo Minsk during a 1–0 win over Dnepr, the club's first win in four matches and the first goal his team scored after a goalless streak of 403 minutes, and temporarily eased the pressure on then Dinamo Minsk manager Oleg Vasilenko. In total, he made nine league appearances and scored two goals for Dinamo Minsk. In 2011, Zebelyan signed for Tobol Kostanay, debuting in the Champions League against Slovan Bratislava, but suffered an injury which caused him to get treatment in Armenia.

== International career ==
=== Youth ===
Zebelyan has represented Armenia at youth level. He was eligible to represent Russia, having been born there.

=== Senior ===
Zebelyan made seven appearances for the Armenia national team from 2006 to 2008. He debuted for Armenia during a 1–0 loss to Finland. He participated in the UEFA Euro 2008 qualifying matches. In 2011, he was recalled to a training camp for the Armenia national team but did not make another appearance for them.

== Post-playing career ==
After retirement, Zebelyan worked in real estate.

== Style of play ==
As a youth player, Zebelyan initially operated as a defender before starting to operate as a striker.

== Personal life ==
Zebelyan's father had to buy his transfer rights so he could play for Zhemchuzhina Sochi. Zebelyan has a wife and son.
