= Andrei Kovalenko (Belarusian footballer) =

Belarusian footballer

Personal information
- Full name: Andrei Valeryevich Kovalenko
- Date of birth: 20 March 1970 (age 56)
- Place of birth: Gomel, Belarusian SSR
- Height: 1.79 m (5 ft 10 in)
- Positions: Midfielder; forward

Youth career
- DYuSSh Gomel

Senior career*
Years	Team	Apps	(Gls)
1987–1988	Gomselmash Gomel	5	(0)
1988–1989	Shinnik Bobruisk		
1989–1990	Gomselmash Gomel	38	(4)
1991	Kuban Barannikovsky	28	(15)
1991–1992	Kuban Krasnodar	43	(8)
1993	Rotor Volgograd	29	(3)
1994–1995	Kolos Krasnodar	73	(26)
1996–1998	Rostselmash Rostov-on-Don	54	(9)
1999	Arsenal Tula	7	(1)
1999–2000	Fakel Voronezh	24	(4)
2000–2001	Kristall Smolensk	28	(5)
2001–2002	Kuban Krasnodar	32	(3)
2002	Rubin Kazan	10	(1)
2003	Terek Grozny	39	(5)
2004	Luch-Energiya Vladivostok	6	(0)
2006	Dynamo Stavropol	2	(0)

International career
1995	Belarus	1	(0)
- * Club domestic league appearances and goals

Andrei Valeryevich Kovalenko (Russian: Андрей Валерьевич Коваленко; born 20 March 1970) is a former Belarusian professional footballer.

== Club career ==
He made his professional debut in the Soviet Second League in 1987 for Gomselmash Gomel.

== Personal life ==
His younger brother Konstantin Kovalenko also played football professionally.

== Honours ==
Terek Grozny

- Russian Cup winner: 2003–04
