= Sabitov =

Sabitov (Russian: Сабитов) is a masculine surname of Tatar origin, its feminine counterpart is Sabitova. It may refer to

- Ravil Sabitov (born 1968), Russian football coach and former player
- Renat Sabitov (born 1985), Russian football player
