= Manuk Kakosyan =

Armenian-Russian footballer

Personal information
- Full name: Manuk Arsenovich Kakosyan
- Date of birth: 1 August 1974 (age 52)
- Place of birth: Sochi, Russian SFSR
- Height: 1.62 m (5 ft 4 in)
- Positions: Striker; midfielder

Youth career
- DYuSSh-7 Sochi

Senior career*
Years	Team	Apps	(Gls)
1996	FC Dynamo-Zhemchuzhina-2 Sochi	30	(14)
1997–1999	FC Zhemchuzhina Sochi	64	(3)
2000–2001	FC Chernomorets Novorossiysk	49	(3)
2002–2003	FC Volgar-Gazprom Astrakhan	27	(1)
2003	FC Luch-Energiya Vladivostok	10	(1)
2005–2006	FC Sochi-04	39	(0)
2007	FC SKA Rostov-on-Don	13	(0)
2008	FC Sochi-04	26	(1)

International career
1999	Armenia	3	(0)
- * Club domestic league appearances and goals

Manuk Arsenovich Kakosyan (Russian: Манук Арсенович Какосьян; born 1 August 1974) is a former Armenian professional footballer who also holds Russian citizenship.

== Club career ==
He made his professional debut in the Russian Third League in 1996 for FC Dynamo-Zhemchuzhina-2 Sochi.
