= Konstantin Ledovskikh =

Kazakhstani footballer and coach

Personal information
- Full name: Konstantin Vyacheslavovich Ledovskikh
- Date of birth: 12 July 1972 (age 54)
- Place of birth: Karaganda, Kazakh SSR
- Height: 1.92 m (6 ft 3 1/2 in)
- Position: Goalkeeper

Senior career*
Years	Team	Apps	(Gls)
1989–1991	FC Shakhter Karagandy	11	(0)
1992	FC Bolat	30	(0)
1993–1994	FC Uralmash Yekaterinburg	39	(0)
1994–1995	FC Dnipro Dnipropetrovsk	1	(0)
1995–1996	FC Metalurh Novomoskovsk	1	(0)
1997–1998	FC Arsenal Tula	33	(0)
1999–2000	FC Zhemchuzhina-Sochi	44	(0)
2001	FC Volgar-Gazprom Astrakhan	22	(0)
2002	Ferrocarril (Spain)		
2003	FC Volgar-Gazprom Astrakhan	9	(0)
2004	FC Lukoil Chelyabinsk	10	(0)
2005	FC Sochi-04	18	(0)
2006	FC Okean Nakhodka	6	(0)
2007	FC Sochi-04	21	(0)
2009	FC Okzhetpes	5	(0)

International career
2000	Kazakhstan	1	(0)

Managerial career
- 2008: FC Okzhetpes (GK coach)
- 2008: FC Okzhetpes (caretaker)
- 2009: FC Okzhetpes (scout)
- 2013: FC Kyzylzhar (GK coach)
- * Club domestic league appearances and goals

Konstantin Vyacheslavovich Ledovskikh (Russian: Константин Вячеславович Ледовских; born 12 July 1972) is a Kazakhstani professional football coach and a former player.

== Club career ==
He made his professional debut in the Soviet Second League in 1989 for FC Shakhter Karagandy.

== Honours ==
- Ukrainian Premier League 3rd place: 1995.
