= Igor Bychkov =

Igor Bychkov may refer to:

- Igor Bychkov (footballer) (1958–2009), Russian football coach and former player
- Igor Bychkov (pole vaulter) (born 1987), Ukrainian-born pole vaulter who represents Spain
- Igor Bychkov (water polo) (born 1994), Russian water polo player
