= Sergei Galmakov =

Russian-Ukrainian footballer

Personal information
- Full name: Sergei Grigoryevich Galmakov
- Date of birth: 16 March 1971 (age 55)
- Height: 1.90 m (6 ft 3 in)
- Position: Defender

Youth career
- OShISP Dnipropetrovsk

Senior career*
Years	Team	Apps	(Gls)
1990–1991	FC Hirnyk Pavlohrad		
1991	FC Shakhtar Ordzhonikidze		
1992	FC Zirka Kirovohrad	9	(2)
1992–1993	FC Hirnyk Pavlohrad		
1993	FC Metalurh Novomoskovsk	20	(0)
1994	FC Dnipro Dnipropetrovsk	0	(0)
1994	FC Shakhtar Pavlohrad	4	(0)
1994–1995	FC Metalurh Novomoskovsk	48	(14)
1996–1998	FC Zhemchuzhina Sochi	58	(4)
1999	FC Lokomotiv Nizhny Novgorod	0	(0)
2000–2003	FC Zhemchuzhina Sochi	82	(8)
- * Club domestic league appearances and goals

Sergei Georgiyevich Galmakov (Russian: Серге́й Георгиевич Гальмаков; Ukrainian: Сергій Григорович Гальмаков - Serhiy Hryhorovych Halmakov; born 16 March 1971) is a former Russian professional footballer. He also holds Ukrainian citizenship.

== Club career ==
He made his professional debut in the Ukrainian Second League in 1992 for FC Zirka Kirovohrad.
