= Arsen Naydyonov =

Russian football coach

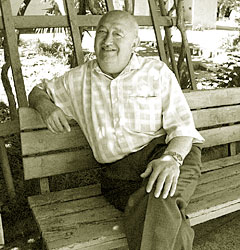
- Naydyonov in 2007

Personal information
- Full name: Arseny Yudilyevich Naydyonov
- Date of birth: 12 August 1941
- Place of birth: Alma-Ata, Kazakh SSR, Soviet Union
- Date of death: 7 June 2010 (aged 68)
- Place of death: Sochi, Russia
- Position: Striker

Senior career*
Years	Team	Apps	(Gls)
- Arsenal Kyiv
- Andijan

Managerial career
- 1964: Tsement Novorossiysk (assistant)
- 1965–1966: Energiya Cheboksary
- 1968: Metallurg Chimkent (director)
- 1969: Shakhtyor Kumertau
- 1970: Gornyak Raychikhinsk
- 1971: Mashinostroitel Pskov
- 1972: Stroitel Syktyvkar
- 1973–1974: Vulkan Petropavlovsk-Kamchatsky
- 1977: Zvezda Perm
- 1978–1979: Shakhtyor Karaganda
- 1980: Tsement Novorossiysk
- 1984: Volga Gorky
- 1985: Kolkhozchi Ashkhabad
- 1986–1990: Tsement Novorossiysk
- 1990: Kuzbass Kemerovo
- 1991–1997: Zhemchuzhina Sochi
- 1999: Lokomotiv Nizhny Novgorod (assistant)
- 2000: Zhemchuzhina Sochi
- 2002: Avtomobilist Noginsk
- 2002–2003: Zhemchuzhina Sochi
- 2003: Zhemchuzhina Sochi (general director)
- 2005: Sakhalin Yuzhno-Sakhalinsk
- 2005: SKA Rostov-on-Don
- 2006: Burevestnik-YuRGUES
- 2007: Zhemchuzhina-A Sochi
- 2007: Zhemchuzhina-A Sochi (president)
- 2008: Zhemchuzhina-Sochi (director of sports)
- * Club domestic league appearances and goals

Arseny Yudilyevich Naydyonov (Russian: Арсений Юдильевич Найдёнов; 12 August 1941 – 7 June 2010), commonly known as Arsen Naydyonov, was a Russian professional football coach. He was born as Arseny Rozman and took his wife's last name after the wedding, deciding his original Jewish last name would not help him in his career.

As a head coach of FC Zhemchuzhina Sochi he won zonal tournament of the Soviet Second League B (1991) and zonal tournament of the Russian First League (1992), than spent five seasons (1993–97) in the Russian Top League.
