= Eduard Partsikyan =

Armenian-Russian footballer

Personal information
- Full name: Eduard Khachikovich Partsikyan
- Date of birth: 5 July 1976 (age 50)
- Place of birth: Sochi, Russian SFSR
- Height: 1.77 m (5 ft 10 in)
- Position: Midfielder

Youth career
- Trudovye Rezervy Sochi

Senior career*
Years	Team	Apps	(Gls)
1995	FC Zhemchuzhina-d Sochi	10	(0)
1997	FC Dynamo-Zhemchuzhina-2 Sochi	6	(0)
1998–1999	FC Zhemchuzhina-2 Sochi	48	(10)
1999	FC Zhemchuzhina Sochi	11	(0)
2000–2001	FC Rubin Kazan	36	(1)
2002	FC Zhemchuzhina Sochi	19	(1)
2003–2004	FC Pyunik	19	(2)
2005	FC Sochi-04	16	(0)
2006	FC Pyunik	12	(0)

International career
2003	Armenia	3	(0)
- * Club domestic league appearances and goals

Eduard Khachikovich Partsikyan (Armenian: Էդուարդ Խաչիկի Պարցիկյան, Russian: Эдуард Хачикович Парцикян; born 5 July 1976) is a former Armenian professional footballer. He also holds Russian citizenship.

== Club career ==
He made his professional debut in the Russian Third League in 1995, playing for FC Zhemchuzhina-d Sochi.

== National team statistics ==
Armenia national team
Year	Apps	Goals
2003	3	0
Total	3	0
