= Konstantin Dyachenko =

Russian footballer

Personal information
- Full name: Konstantin Vladimirovich Dyachenko
- Date of birth: 11 September 1975 (age 51)
- Place of birth: Volgograd, Russian SFSR
- Height: 1.83 m (6 ft 0 in)
- Positions: Midfielder; defender

Senior career*
Years	Team	Apps	(Gls)
1992	FC Tekstilshchik-d Kamyshin	3	(0)
1994	FC Zvezda Gorodishche	13	(0)
1995	FC Dynamo Mikhaylovka	21	(1)
1996	FC Zvezda Gorodishche	28	(1)
1997	FC Kuban Slavyansk-na-Kubani	26	(1)
1998	FC Torpedo Volzhsky	17	(1)
1999	FC Balakovo	8	(0)
1999	FC Torpedo Volzhsky	16	(4)
2000–2001	FC Neftekhimik Nizhnekamsk	30	(2)
2002	FC Svetotekhnika Saransk	25	(0)
2003	FC Kavkazkabel Prokhladny	14	(3)
2003	FC Biokhimik-Mordovia Saransk	17	(4)
2004	FC Torpedo Volzhsky	9	(0)
2004	FC Uralan Elista	18	(0)
2005	FC Spartak-MZhK Ryazan	10	(0)
2005–2006	FC Rotor Volgograd	38	(0)
2008	FC Fakel-StroyArt Voronezh (D4)		
2009	FC FSA Voronezh	10	(0)
- * Club domestic league appearances and goals

Konstantin Vladimirovich Dyachenko (Russian: Константин Владимирович Дьяченко; born 11 September 1975) is a former Russian professional football player.

== Club career ==
He played two seasons in the Russian Football National League for FC Neftekhimik Nizhnekamsk and FC Uralan Elista.
