= Shinkaryov =

Shinkaryov, Shinkarev (Russian: Шинкарёв), feminine: Shinkaryova, Shinkareva is a Russian surname

- leonid Shinkaryov (1930–2022), Soviet and Russian journalist, writer, and traveler
- Oleg Shinkaryov, (born 1965), Soviet and Russian football player
