= 2001 in Russian football =

2001 season

2001 in Russian football saw the ninth title for FC Spartak Moscow and the fourth Cup for FC Lokomotiv Moscow. The national team qualified for the 2002 FIFA World Cup.

== National team ==
Russia national football team qualified for the 2002 FIFA World Cup by finishing first in the UEFA group 1.

| Date | Venue | Opponents | Score^{1} | Competition | Russia scorers | Match report |
|---|---|---|---|---|---|---|
| 28 February 2001 | Theodoros Vardinogiannis Stadium, Heraklion (A) | Greece | 3–3 | F | | Sport-Express |
| 24 March 2001 | Luzhniki Stadium, Moscow (H) | Slovenia | 1–1 | WCQ | Maksim Buznikin (2), Dmitri Khokhlov | FIFA |
| 28 March 2001 | Luzhniki Stadium, Moscow (H) | Faroe Islands | 1–0 | WCQ | Alexander Mostovoi | FIFA |
| 25 April 2001 | Stadion Crvena Zvezda, Belgrade (A) | FR Yugoslavia | 1–0 | WCQ | Vladimir Beschastnykh | FIFA |
| 2 June 2001 | Luzhniki Stadium, Moscow (H) | FR Yugoslavia | 1–1 | WCQ | Yury Kovtun | FIFA |
| 6 June 2001 | Stade Josy Barthel, Luxembourg (A) | Luxembourg | 2–1 | WCQ | Dmitri Alenichev, Sergei Semak | FIFA |
| 15 August 2001 | Luzhniki Stadium, Moscow (H) | Greece | 0–0 | F | | Sport-Express |
| 1 September 2001 | Stadion Bezigrad, Ljubljana (A) | Slovenia | 1–2 | WCQ | Egor Titov | FIFA |
| 5 September 2001 | Tórsvøllur, Tórshavn (A) | Faroe Islands | 3–0 | WCQ | Vladimir Beschastnykh (2), Aleksandr Shirko | FIFA |
| 6 October 2001 | Dynamo Stadium, Moscow (H) | Switzerland | 4–0 | WCQ | Vladimir Beschastnykh (3), Egor Titov | FIFA |
| 14 November 2001 | Skonto stadions, Riga (A) | Latvia | 3–1 | F | Dmitri Khokhlov, Dmitri Alenichev, Aleksandr Panov | Sport-Express |

1. Russia score given first

Key

- H = Home match
- A = Away match
- F = Friendly
- WCQ = 2002 FIFA World Cup qualifying, UEFA Group 1

== Leagues ==
=== Top Division ===
| Pos | Team | Pld | W | D | L | GF | GA | GD | Pts | Qualification or relegation |
|---|---|---|---|---|---|---|---|---|---|---|
| 1 | Spartak Moscow (C) | 30 | 17 | 9 | 4 | 56 | 30 | +26 | 60 | Qualification to Champions League group stage |
| 2 | Lokomotiv Moscow | 30 | 16 | 8 | 6 | 53 | 24 | +29 | 56 | Qualification to Champions League third qualifying round |
| 3 | Zenit St. Petersburg | 30 | 16 | 8 | 6 | 52 | 35 | +17 | 56 | Qualification to UEFA Cup qualifying round |
| 4 | Torpedo Moscow | 30 | 15 | 7 | 8 | 53 | 42 | +11 | 52 | |
| 5 | Krylia Sovetov Samara | 30 | 14 | 7 | 9 | 38 | 23 | +15 | 49 | Qualification to Intertoto Cup second round |
| 6 | Saturn | 30 | 13 | 8 | 9 | 45 | 22 | +23 | 47 | |
| 7 | CSKA Moscow | 30 | 12 | 11 | 7 | 39 | 30 | +9 | 47 | Qualification to UEFA Cup first round |
| 8 | Sokol Saratov | 30 | 12 | 5 | 13 | 31 | 42 | −11 | 41 | |
| 9 | Dynamo Moscow | 30 | 10 | 8 | 12 | 43 | 51 | −8 | 38 | |
| 10 | Rotor Volgograd | 30 | 8 | 8 | 14 | 38 | 42 | −4 | 32 | |
| 11 | Rostselmash | 30 | 8 | 8 | 14 | 29 | 43 | −14 | 32 | |
| 12 | Alania Vladikavkaz | 30 | 8 | 8 | 14 | 31 | 47 | −16 | 32 | |
| 13 | Anzhi Makhachkala | 30 | 7 | 11 | 12 | 28 | 34 | −6 | 32 | |
| 14 | Torpedo-ZIL Moscow | 30 | 7 | 10 | 13 | 22 | 35 | −13 | 31 | |
| 15 | Fakel Voronezh (R) | 30 | 8 | 4 | 18 | 30 | 53 | −23 | 28 | Relegation to First Division |
| 16 | Chernomorets Novorossiysk (R) | 30 | 5 | 8 | 17 | 19 | 54 | −35 | 23 | Relegation to First Division |

Source: rsssf.com
Rules for classification: 1) points; 2) goal difference; 3) number of goals scored.
(C) Champions; (R) Relegated

=== First Division ===
Shinnik Yaroslavl and Uralan Elista returned to the Top Division after occupying two top positions First Division. Uralan were back immediately after relegation in 2000.

| Pos | Team | Pld | W | D | L | GF | GA | GD | Pts | Promotion or relegation |
|---|---|---|---|---|---|---|---|---|---|---|
| 1 | Shinnik Yaroslavl (P) | 34 | 21 | 6 | 7 | 58 | 21 | +37 | 69 | Promotion to Premier League |
| 2 | Uralan Elista (P) | 34 | 19 | 8 | 7 | 55 | 31 | +24 | 65 | Promotion to Premier League |
| 3 | Kuban Krasnodar | 34 | 16 | 12 | 6 | 56 | 29 | +27 | 60 | |
| 4 | Amkar Perm | 34 | 16 | 8 | 10 | 46 | 29 | +17 | 56 | |
| 5 | Spartak Nalchik | 34 | 17 | 4 | 13 | 48 | 37 | +11 | 55 | |
| 6 | Volgar-Gazprom Astrakhan | 34 | 14 | 8 | 12 | 40 | 40 | 0 | 50 | |
| 7 | Tom Tomsk | 34 | 12 | 11 | 11 | 31 | 28 | +3 | 47 | |
| 8 | Rubin Kazan | 34 | 13 | 7 | 14 | 44 | 44 | 0 | 46 | |
| 9 | Metallurg Krasnoyarsk | 34 | 12 | 9 | 13 | 39 | 47 | −8 | 45 | |
| 10 | Kristall Smolensk | 34 | 13 | 5 | 16 | 37 | 45 | −8 | 44 | |
| 11 | Netfekhimik Nizhnekamsk | 34 | 13 | 4 | 17 | 49 | 56 | −7 | 43 | |
| 12 | Khimki | 34 | 13 | 4 | 17 | 42 | 54 | −12 | 43 | |
| 13 | Gazovik-Gazprom Izhevsk | 34 | 12 | 6 | 16 | 38 | 44 | −6 | 42 | |
| 14 | Lada-Togliatti | 34 | 12 | 5 | 17 | 40 | 50 | −10 | 41 | |
| 15 | Lokomotiv Chita | 34 | 12 | 4 | 18 | 38 | 50 | −12 | 40 | |
| 16 | Arsenal Tula (R) | 34 | 10 | 10 | 14 | 27 | 35 | −8 | 40 | Relegation to Second Division |
| 17 | Baltika Kaliningrad (R) | 34 | 11 | 6 | 17 | 35 | 51 | −16 | 39 | Relegation to Second Division |
| 18 | Lokomotiv Nizhny Novgorod (R) | 34 | 9 | 5 | 20 | 26 | 58 | −32 | 32 | Relegation to Second Division |

Source: PFL, RSSSF
(P) Promoted; (R) Relegated

Vitaliy Kakunin of Neftekhimik became the top goalscorer with 20 goals.

=== Second Division ===
Of six clubs that finished first in their respective Second Division zones, three play-off winners were promoted to the First Division:

| Team 1 | Agg. | Team 2 | 1st leg | 2nd leg |
|---|---|---|---|---|
| FC Dynamo Saint Petersburg (West) | 2–1 | FC Metallurg Lipetsk (Centre) | 2–0 | 0–1 |
| FC Svetotekhnika Saransk (Povolzhye) | 1–2 | FC SKA Rostov-on-Don (South) | 1–1 | 0–1 |
| FC Uralmash Yekaterinburg (Ural) | 3–3 | FC SKA-Energia Khabarovsk (East) | 2–2 | 1–1 |

== Cup ==
The Russian Cup was won by Lokomotiv Moscow, who beat Anzhi Makhachkala 4–3 on penalties after the final ended 1–1.

== UEFA club competitions ==
=== 2000–01 UEFA Champions League ===
Spartak Moscow qualified for the second group stage of the 2000–01 UEFA Champions League. Spartak finished fourth in group C which also contained FC Bayern Munich, Arsenal F.C., and Olympique Lyonnais.

=== 2000–01 UEFA Cup ===
Lokomotiv Moscow lost to 0–2 on aggregate to Rayo Vallecano in the third round of the 2000–01 UEFA Cup.

=== 2001–02 UEFA Champions League ===
Lokomotiv Moscow qualified for the group stage of the 2001–02 UEFA Champions League after defeating FC Wacker Tirol 3–2 on aggregate. This meant that Russia had two teams in the group stage of the Champions League for the first time. Lokomotiv finished third in the group with Real Madrid, A.S. Roma, and R.S.C. Anderlecht.

Spartak Moscow, who qualifiers for the group stage automatically, finished last in a group which also contained FC Bayern Munich, AC Sparta Prague, and Feyenoord Rotterdam, scoring only two points.

=== 2001–02 UEFA Cup ===
Four Russian clubs played in the 2001–02 UEFA Cup. Chernomorets Novorossiysk, who were struggling in the league, lost both first round matches to Valencia CF (0–6 on aggregate). Torpedo Moscow also failed to progress, losing 2–3 on aggregate to Ipswich Town F.C.

Anzhi Makhachkala's fixture against Rangers F.C. was ordered by UEFA to be played over one leg at a neutral site. The tie was played soon after September 11 attacks, and UEFA decided not to play matches in Makhachkala due to the situation in Chechnya. Rangers won the match in Warsaw 1–0.

The only club to progress to the second round was Dynamo Moscow, who overcome Birkirkara F.C. 1–0 on aggregate. In the second round Dynamo were beaten 7–2 on aggregate by Rangers.
