= Telegin =

Telegin (Russian: Телегин, from telega, a type of horse-drawn vehicle) is a Russian masculine surname; its feminine counterpart is Telegina. It may refer to:

- Angelina Telegina (born 1992), Russian ice dancer
- Dmitri Telegin (born 1992), Russian football player
- Ilya Telegin (born 1981), Uzbekistani football player
- Ivan Telegin (born 1992), Russian ice hockey player
- Konstantin Telegin (1899–1981), Soviet general
- Sergei Telegin (born 2000), Russian ice hockey player
