= Vladimir Medvedev (footballer) =

Russian footballer

Personal information
- Full name: Vladimir Nikolayevich Medvedev
- Date of birth: 10 July 1971 (age 55)
- Height: 1.76 m (5 ft 9 1/2 in)
- Position: Midfielder

Senior career*
Years	Team	Apps	(Gls)
1992	Stroitel Starye Dorogi	17	(4)
1992–1993	Torpedo Adler	8	(8)
1993–1994	Zhemchuzhina Sochi	3	(0)
1994	Stroitel Starye Dorogi	6	(1)
1994–1996	Zhemchuzhina Sochi	3	(0)
1995	→ Zhemchuzhina-2 Sochi	14	(0)
1995	→ Torpedo Armavir (loan)	8	(1)
1996	→ Zhemchuzhina-2 Sochi	30	(2)
1997–1998	Energiya Chaykovsky	65	(1)
1999–2002	Metallurg-ZAPSIB Novokuznetsk	64	(6)
2003	Zhemchuzhina Sochi	19	(0)
2005	Amur Blagoveshchensk	15	(0)
- * Club domestic league appearances and goals

Vladimir Nikolayevich Medvedev (Russian: Владимир Николаевич Медведев; born 10 July 1971) is a former Russian football player.
