= Serhiy Shchehlov =

Ukrainian-Russian footballer

Personal information
- Full name: Serhiy Yevhenovych Shchehlov
- Date of birth: 26 November 1976 (age 49)
- Place of birth: Donetsk, Ukrainian SSR
- Height: 1.76 m (5 ft 9 1/2 in)
- Position: Midfielder

Team information
- Current team: Avangard Kursk

Senior career*
Years	Team	Apps	(Gls)
1995–1996	Viktor Zaporizhzhia	10	(2)
1996–1998	Khimik Sievierodonetsk	41	(2)
1998–1999	Shakhtar Makiivka	16	(0)
1999–2000	Jakobstads Bollklubb	35	(10)
2001–2004	Khimki	112	(8)
2004–2006	Kryvbas Kryvyi Rih	34	(0)
2006–2007	Simurq Zaqatala	6	(0)
2007–2008	Avangard Kursk	57	(0)
2009	Chita	30	(0)
2010–	Avangard Kursk	70	(0)
- * Club domestic league appearances and goals as of 03:06, 13 June 2013 (UTC)

Serhiy Yevhenovych Shchehlov (Ukrainian: Сергій Євгенович Щеглов; Russian: Серге́й Евгеньевич Щеглов; born 26 November 1976) is a Ukrainian professional football player. Currently, he plays for Avangard Kursk. He also holds Russian citizenship.

== Honours ==
- Russian Cup finalist: 2005 (played in the early stages of the 2004–05 tournament for FC Khimki).
