= Dmitri Sachkov =

Russian footballer

Personal information
- Full name: Dmitri Sergeyevich Sachkov
- Date of birth: 13 January 1976 (age 50)
- Height: 1.89 m (6 ft 2 in)
- Position: Forward

Senior career*
Years	Team	Apps	(Gls)
1994–1995	FC Saturn-1991 St. Petersburg	1	(0)
1996–1997	FC Lokomotiv-d St. Petersburg	43	(7)
1998	FC Dynamo St. Petersburg	12	(3)
1999	FC Kondopoga (D4)	?	(5)
1999	FC Pskov (D4)	11	(11)
2000–2003	FC Pskov-2000	114	(76)
2003–2004	FC Chkalovets-1936 Novosibirsk	19	(7)
2004	FC Pskov-2000	5	(1)
2006	FC Nara-Desna Naro-Fominsk	11	(3)
2006–2007	FC Sheksna Cherepovets	37	(14)
- * Club domestic league appearances and goals

Dmitri Sergeyevich Sachkov (Russian: Дмитрий Серге́евич Сачков; born 13 January 1976) is a former Russian professional football player.

== Club career ==
He played in the Russian Football National League for FC Saturn-1991 St. Petersburg in 1995.

== Honours ==
- Russian Second Division Zone West top scorer: 2000 (22 goals), 2001 (21 goals).
