= Bazarno-Karabulaksky District =

Bazarno-Karabulaksky District Базарно-Карабулакский район (Russian)
- District
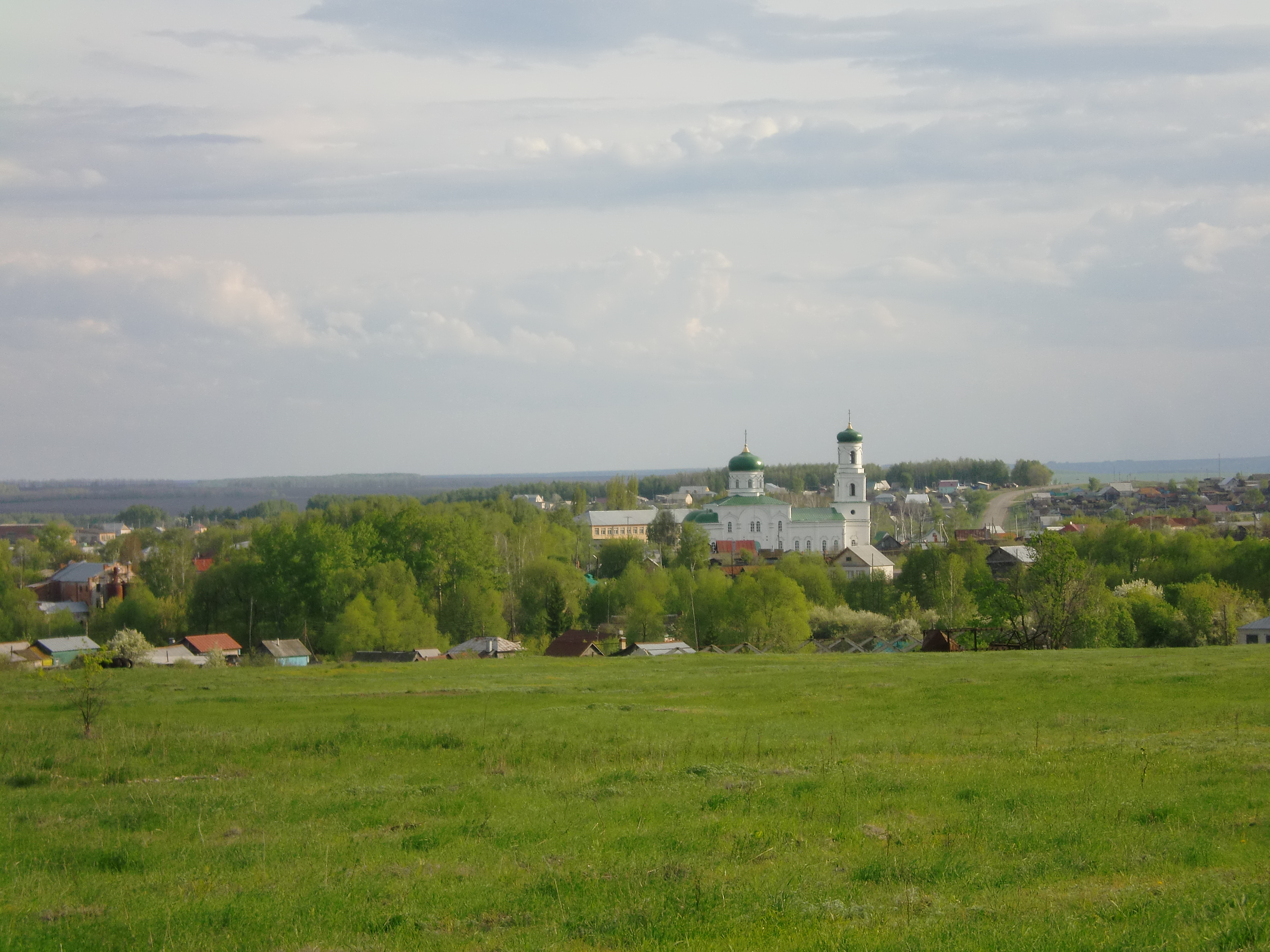
- Church in Alexyevka, Bazarno-Karabulaksky District

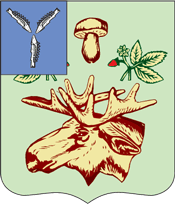
- Coat of arms
- Location of Bazarno-Karabulaksky District in Saratov Oblast
- Coordinates: 52°16′20″N 46°24′50″E
- Country: Russia
- Federal subject: Saratov Oblast
- Established: 23 July 1928
- Administrative center: Bazarny Karabulak

Area
  - Total: 2,300 km^{2} (890 sq mi)

Population (2010 Census)
  - Total: 31,841
  - Density: 14/km^{2} (36/sq mi)
  - Urban: 37.7%
  - Rural: 62.3%

Administrative structure
  - Inhabited localities: 2 urban-type settlements, 45 rural localities

Municipal structure
  - Municipally incorporated as: Bazarno-Karabulaksky Municipal District
  - Municipal divisions: 2 urban settlements, 11 rural settlements
- Time zone: UTC+4 (MSK+1)
- OKTMO ID: 63606000

Bazarno-Karabulaksky District (Russian: База́рно-Карабула́кский райо́н) is an administrative and municipal district (raion), one of the thirty-eight in Saratov Oblast, Russia. It is located in the north of the oblast. The area of the district is 2,300 square kilometers (890 sq mi). Its administrative center is the urban locality (a work settlement) of Bazarny Karabulak. Population: 31,841 (2010 Census); 36,571 (2002 census); 36,391 (1989 Soviet census). The population of Bazarny Karabulak accounts for 30.9% of the district's total population.
