= Sergey Zelikov =

Russian footballer

Personal information
- Full name: Sergey Sergeevich Zelikov
- Date of birth: 31 January 1974 (age 52)
- Place of birth: Astrakhan Oblast, Russian SFSR
- Height: 1.79 m (5 ft 10 1/2 in)
- Position: Forward

Senior career*
| Years | Team | Apps | (Gls) |
| 1991–1992 | FC SKA Rostov-on-Don | 45 | (12) |
| 1993 | FC Obninsk | 11 | (1) |
| 1993–1994 | FC SKA Rostov-on-Don | 49 | (8) |
| 1995 | FC Industriya Obninsk | 13 | (3) |
| 1995–1996 | FC Istochnik Rostov-on-Don | 26 | (10) |
| 1996 | FC SKA Rostov-on-Don | 17 | (5) |
| 1997–1998 | FC Torpedo Arzamas | 68 | (4) |
| 1999–2003 | FC SKA Rostov-on-Don | 131 | (43) |
| 2003 | FC Dynamo Saint Petersburg | 9 | (1) |
| 2004 | FC SKA Rostov-on-Don | 16 | (7) |
| 2004 | FC Volgar-Gazprom Astrakhan | 6 | (2) |
| 2005 | FC Lokomotiv Nizhny Novgorod | | |
- * Club domestic league appearances and goals

Sergey Sergeevich Zelikov (Russian: Серге́й Серге́евич Зеликов; born 31 January 1974) is a former Russian professional footballer.

== Club career ==
In 1993, he returned from FC Obninsk to FC SKA Rostov-on-Don.

He played two seasons in the Russian Football National League for FC SKA Rostov-on-Don and FC Dynamo Saint Petersburg.
