= Sergey Matveyev (footballer) =

Russian footballer and coach

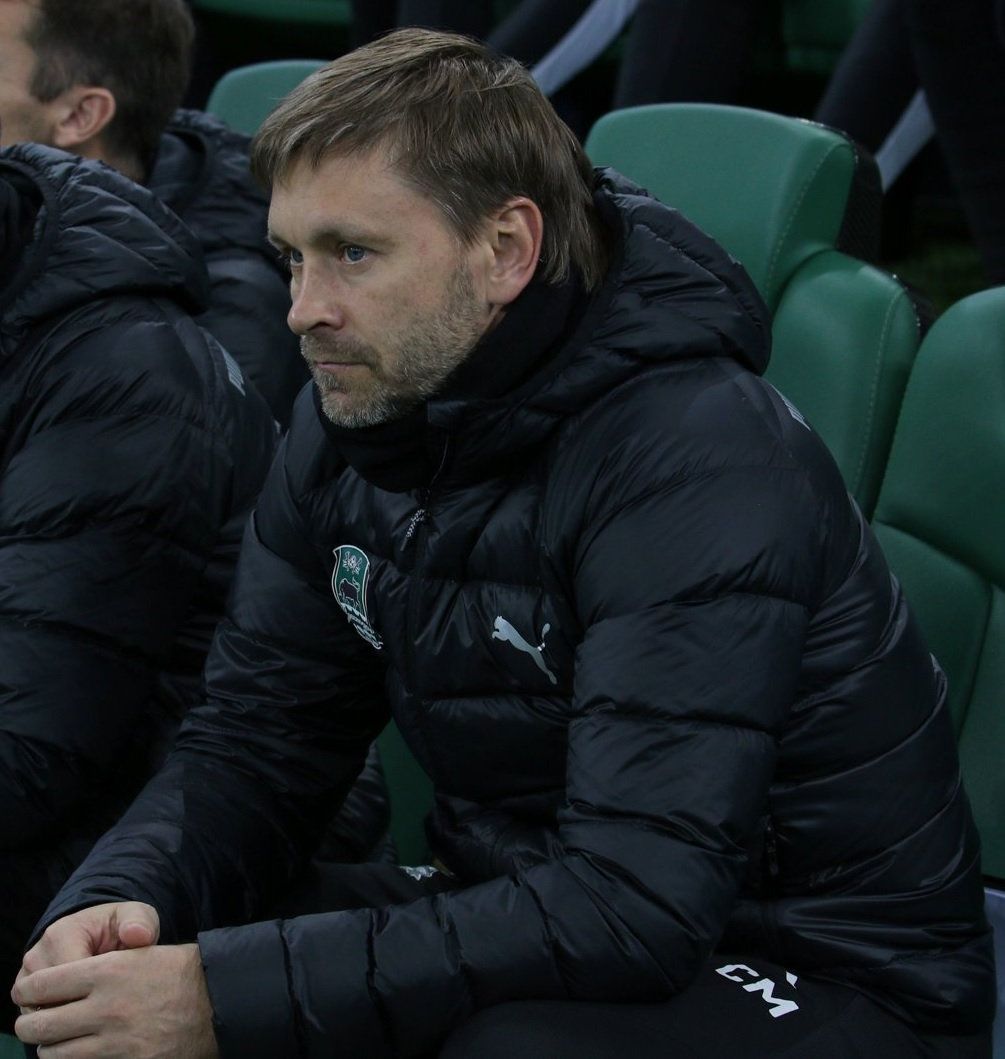
- Matveyev coaching FC Krasnodar in 2019

Personal information
- Full name: Sergey Vasilyevich Matveyev
- Date of birth: 25 April 1972 (age 54)
- Height: 1.78 m (5 ft 10 in)
- Position: Midfielder

Senior career*
| Years | Team | Apps | (Gls) |
| 1992–1993 | FC Mashinostroitel Sergiyev Posad (amateur) | | |
| 1994–1995 | FC Mashinostroitel Sergiyev Posad | 60 | (20) |
| 1995 | FC Neftekhimik Nizhnekamsk | 19 | (0) |
| 1996 | FC Mashinostroitel Sergiyev Posad | 16 | (6) |
| 1996 | FC Saturn Ramenskoye | 14 | (1) |
| 1997–2003 | FC Sportakademklub Moscow | 210 | (54) |

Managerial career
- 2004: FC Sportakademklub Moscow
- 2008: FC Sportakademklub Moscow (assistant)
- 2009: FC Khimki (assistant)
- 2010–2013: FC Dynamo Moscow (academy)
- 2013–2014: Russia U15
- 2014–2015: Russia U16
- 2015–2016: Russia U17
- 2016: Russia U18
- 2019–2020: FC Krasnodar (head coach)
- * Club domestic league appearances and goals

Sergey Vasilyevich Matveyev (Russian: Сергей Васильевич Матвеев; born 25 April 1972) is a Russian football coach and a former player.

== Playing career ==
He made his professional debut in the 1994 Russian Third League for FC Mashinostroitel Sergiyev Posad.

== Coaching career ==
Before the 2019–20 season, he was hired by FC Krasnodar as head coach. He left the club in June 2020.
