= Viktor Nozdrin =

Russian footballer and coach (1951–2024)

Personal information
- Full name: Viktor Aleksandrovich Nozdrin
- Date of birth: 16 November 1951
- Place of birth: Gubakha, Molotov Oblast, Russian SFSR, USSR
- Date of death: 22 September 2024 (aged 72)
- Place of death: Moscow, Russia
- Height: 1.72 m (5 ft 8 in)
- Positions: Midfielder; defender

Senior career*
Years	Team	Apps	(Gls)
1971–1974	FC Metallurg Lipetsk		
1976–1977	FC Lokomotiv Moscow	22	(0)
1977	FC Spartak Moscow	25	(1)
1978	PFC Spartak Nalchik		
1980–1984	FC Spartak Kostroma		

Managerial career
- 1988: FC Krasnaya Presnya Moscow (assistant)
- 1996–1997: FC Metallurg Lipetsk (assistant)
- 1998: FC Krasnoznamensk-Selyatino Krasnoznamensk
- 2000–2001: FC Spartak Kostroma
- 2002: FC Pskov-2000 Pskov
- 2004–2005: FC Volga Tver
- 2005–2008: FC Nara-ShBFR Naro-Fominsk
- 2009: FC Znamya Truda Orekhovo-Zuyevo
- 2009: FC Sakhalin Yuzhno-Sakhalinsk
- * Club domestic league appearances and goals

Viktor Aleksandrovich Nozdrin (Russian: Виктор Александрович Ноздрин; 6 November 1951 – 22 September 2024) was a Russian professional football coach and a player. In 2009, he managed FC Sakhalin Yuzhno-Sakhalinsk. Nozdrin died in Moscow on 22 September 2024, at the age of 72.
