= Viktor Papayev =

Russian footballer

Personal information
- Full name: Viktor Yevgenyevich Papayev
- Date of birth: 2 March 1947 (age 79)
- Place of birth: Bazarny Karabulak, Saratov Oblast, USSR
- Height: 1.76 m (5 ft 9 1/2 in)
- Position: Midfielder

Youth career
- DYuSSh Frunze

Senior career*
Years	Team	Apps	(Gls)
1964	Energia Saratov		
1965–1967	Sokol Saratov		
1968–1973	FC Spartak Moscow		
1974	CSKA Moscow		
1975–1976	FC Spartak Moscow		
1977–1980	FC Fakel Voronezh		
1980–1981	FC Znamya Truda Orekhovo-Zuyevo		

International career
1969–1970	USSR	4	

Managerial career
- 1984: FC Znamya Truda Orekhovo-Zuyevo
- 1985: Krasnaya Presnya Moscow (assistant)
- 1986–1987: FC Volzhanin Kineshma
- 1987–1988: FC Fakel Voronezh
- 1989: FC Arsenal Tula
- 1989–1991: USSR U-17
- 1992: FC Rotor Volgograd
- 1992–1993: Bahrain U-17 (assistant)
- 1998: FC Balakovo
- 2000: FC Khimki (assistant)
- 2000: FC Khimki
- 2004: FC Saturn Yegoryevsk
- 2006: FC Gomel
- * Club domestic league appearances and goals

Viktor Yevgenyevich Papayev (Russian: Виктор Евгеньевич Папаев; born 2 March 1947 in Bazarny Karabulak, Saratov Oblast) is a retired Soviet football player and a current Russian coach.

== Honours ==
- Soviet Top League winner: 1969.
- Soviet Cup winner: 1971.

== International career ==
Papayev made his debut for USSR on 6 August 1969 in a friendly against Sweden.
