= Sergei Stepanov (footballer) =

Russian footballer

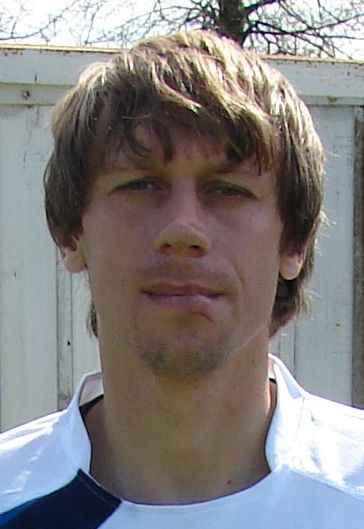

Personal information
- Full name: Sergei Valentinovich Stepanov
- Date of birth: 3 February 1976 (age 50)
- Height: 1.85 m (6 ft 1 in)
- Position: Midfielder

Youth career
- Iskra Pskov

Senior career*
| Years | Team | Apps | (Gls) |
| 1992–1995 | Mashinostroitel Pskov | 73 | (6) |
| 1996–1998 | Zvezda Irkutsk | 68 | (3) |
| 1999 | Pskov (amat.) | 17 | (7) |
| 2000–2001 | Pskov-2000 | 49 | (23) |
| 2001–2002 | Torpedo-ZIL Moscow | 14 | (0) |
| 2003 | Pskov-2000 | 16 | (4) |
| 2003 | Lukoil Chelyabinsk | 16 | (1) |
| 2004 | FC Luki-SKIF Velikiye Luki (amat.) | 4 | (0) |
| 2004–2005 | Naftan Novopolotsk | 12 | (3) |
| 2006 | Volochanin-Ratmir Vyshny Volochyok | 28 | (4) |
| 2007 | Dynamo Saint Petersburg | 26 | (2) |
| 2008–2010 | Pskov-747 | 87 | (15) |
- * Club domestic league appearances and goals

Sergei Valentinovich Stepanov (Russian: Серге́й Валентинович Степанов; born 3 February 1976) is a former Russian professional footballer.

== Club career ==
He made his debut in the Russian Premier League in 2001 for FC Torpedo-ZIL Moscow.
