= Alexandr Mukanin =

Tajikistani footballer

Personal information
- Full name: Alexandr Vyacheslavovich Mukanin
- Date of birth: 24 August 1978 (age 48)
- Height: 1.78 m (5 ft 10 in)
- Position: Goalkeeper

Senior career*
Years	Team	Apps	(Gls)
1999–2000	Varzob Dushanbe		
2001–2002	FC Zhemchuzhina Sochi	27	(0)
2003–2004	BDA Dushanbe		
2005–2006	Regar-TadAZ Tursunzoda		
2007	Hima Dushanbe		

International career^{‡}
2000–2007	Tajikistan	9	(0)
- * Club domestic league appearances and goals as of 22 October 2015 ‡ National team caps and goals as of 22 October 2015

Alexandr Vyacheslavovich Mukanin (Russian: Александр Вячеславович Муканин; born 24 August 1978) is a Tajikistani professional footballer who also holds Russian citizenship.

== Career ==
Mukanin made his professional debut in the Tajikistan Higher League in 1999 for Varzob Dushanbe.

== Career statistics ==
=== International ===
Tajikistan national team
Year	Apps	Goals
2000	2	0
2001	0	0
2002	0	0
2003	0	0
2004	0	0
2005	0	0
2006	2	0
2007	5	0
Total	9	0

Statistics accurate as of 22 October 2015

== Honours ==
Varzob Dushanbe

- Tajikistan Higher League (2): 1999, 2000,
- Tajikistan Cup (1): 1999

Regar-TadAZ

- Tajikistan Higher League (1): 2006
- Tajikistan Cup (2): 2005, 2006
- AFC President's Cup (1): 2005

Tajikistan

- AFC Challenge Cup (1): 2006
