= Nikolai Barkalov =

Russian footballer

Personal information
- Full name: Nikolai Anatolyevich Barkalov
- Date of birth: October 2, 1974 (age 52)
- Place of birth: Zelenograd, Russian SFSR
- Height: 1.84 m (6 ft 1/2 in)
- Position: Midfielder

Senior career*
Years	Team	Apps	(Gls)
1991	FC Zvezda Moskva	2	(0)
1992–1995	FC Torpedo-d	131	(10)
1995	FC Torpedo Moscow	2	(0)
1997–1998	FC Torpedo-ZIL Moscow	72	(7)
1999–2004	FC Khimki	164	(5)
2005	FC Ryazan-Agrokomplekt Ryazan	24	(0)
2006	FC Zelenograd (D4)		
2006	FC Reutov	21	(0)
2007–2009	FC Zelenograd	79	(3)
- * Club domestic league appearances and goals

Nikolai Anatolyevich Barkalov (Russian: Николай Анатольевич Баркалов; born October 2, 1974) is a retired Russian professional footballer.

He made his debut in the Russian Premier League in 1995 for FC Torpedo Moscow.

== Biography ==
He started playing football at the Moscow football school.

In 1992, he joined Torpedo Moscow and played for the backup team. In four years, he played 131 matches and scored 10 goals. He made his debut on July 8, 1995 with the main team in a major league match against Nizhny Novgorod Lokomotiv. He played two matches and left the team at the end of the 1995 season.

Since 2013, he has been working as a massage therapist for Spartak Moscow, first with Spartak-2, and since 2017 with the main team.
