= Oleg Shinkaryov =

Russian footballer and official

Personal information
- Full name: Oleg Vasilyevich Shinkaryov
- Date of birth: 28 February 1965 (age 61)
- Height: 1.76 m (5 ft 9 1/2 in)
- Positions: Defender; midfielder

Youth career
- –1982: ShISP Voroshilovhrad
- FC Kuban Krasnodar

Senior career*
Years	Team	Apps	(Gls)
1982	FC Stakhanovets Stakhanov	1	(0)
1982	FC Kuban Krasnodar	0	(0)
1982	FC Tsement Novorossiysk	13	(1)
1983–1984	Kolkhozchi Ashkhabad	44	(1)
1985–1987	FC SKA Rostov-on-Don	56	(1)
1988	FC Lokomotiv Moscow	0	(0)
1988	FC Zorya Voroshilovgrad	29	(0)
1989–1990	FC Tsement Novorossiysk	51	(3)
1991–1994	FC Zhemchuzhina Sochi	56	(1)
1993	→ FC Torpedo Adler	5	(0)
1994	FC Khimik Belorechensk	7	(0)
1994	FC Kuban Slavyansk-na-Kubani	6	(0)

Managerial career
- 2001–2002: FC Zhemchuzhina Sochi (video operator)
- 2003: FC Zhemchuzhina Sochi (administrator)
- 2005–2008: FC Sochi-04 (general director)
- 2009: FC Kuban Krasnodar (administrator)
- 2010: FC Zhemchuzhina-Sochi (director)
- * Club domestic league appearances and goals

Oleg Vasilyevich Shinkaryov (Russian: Олег Васильевич Шинкарёв; born 28 February 1965) is a Russian professional football official and a former player.
