= Kirill Volkov =

Russian footballer

Personal information
- Full name: Kirill Vladislavovich Volkov
- Date of birth: 3 February 2006 (age 20)
- Place of birth: Safonovo, Smolensk Oblast, Russia
- Height: 1.80 m (5 ft 11 in)
- Position: Defender

Team information
- Current team: Volgar Astrakhan
- Number: 67

Youth career
- 2013–2016: FSK Safonovo
- 2016–2017: Iskra Smolensk
- 2018: Krasny
- 2019–2024: Lokomotiv Moscow

Senior career*
Years	Team	Apps	(Gls)
2024–2026	Lokomotiv Moscow	0	(0)
2024	→ Arsenal Dzerzhinsk (loan)	14	(0)
2025	→ Arsenal Dzerzhinsk (loan)	21	(0)
2026–	Volgar Astrakhan	30	(0)

International career^{‡}
2021	Russia U-15	6	(0)
2021–2022	Russia U-16	8	(0)
2022–2023	Russia U-17	8	(0)
2024	Russia U-19	1	(0)
2025	Russia U-20	2	(0)
- * Club domestic league appearances and goals as of 15 November 2026 ‡ National team caps and goals as of 7 June 2025

Kirill Vladislavovich Volkov (Russian: Кирилл Владиславович Волков; born 3 February 2006) is a Russian footballer who plays as a defender for Volgar Astrakhan.

== Career ==
He made his debut in the Belarusian Premier League for Arsenal Dzerzhinsk on 4 August 2024 in a game against Torpedo-BelAZ Zhodino.

On 16 February 2026, Volkov moved to Volgar Astrakhan of the Russian Second League.
