= Igor Shinkarenko =

Russian footballer and manager

Personal information
- Full name: Igor Vladimirovich Shinkarenko
- Date of birth: 18 June 1956 (age 70)
- Place of birth: Nikolayevsk-on-Amur, Khabarovsk Krai, Russian SFSR

Senior career*
| Years | Team | Apps | (Gls) |
| 1987 | FC Universitet Saransk | | |
| 1989 | FC Burevestnik Saransk | | |

Managerial career
- 1987: FC Universitet Saransk
- 1988: FC Svetotekhnika Saransk
- 1989–1991: FC Universitet Saransk
- 1992: FC MGU Saransk
- 1993: FC Saranskeksport Saransk
- 1996–2000: FC Biokhimik-Mordovia Saransk
- 2001–2004: FC Biokhimik-Mordovia Saransk (general director)
- 2006: FC Amkar Perm (assistant)
- 2007: FC Krylia Sovetov Samara (assistant)
- 2014–2015: FC Mordovia Saransk (reserves)
- 2016: FC KAMAZ Naberezhnye Chelny
- * Club domestic league appearances and goals

Igor Vladimirovich Shinkarenko (Russian: Игорь Владимирович Шинкаренко; born 18 June 1956) is a Russian professional football coach and former player.

He is also the father of Aleksandr Shinkarenko.
