= Andrei Cherenkov =

Russian footballer and manager

Personal information
- Full name: Andrei Nikolayevich Cherenkov
- Date of birth: 8 October 1976 (age 50)
- Height: 1.77 m (5 ft 10 in)
- Position: Forward

Team information
- Current team: FC Zorkiy Krasnogorsk (manager)

Senior career*
Years	Team	Apps	(Gls)
1995	Istochnik Rostov-on-Don	6	(0)
1997–1999	Rostselmash Rostov-on-Don	0	(0)
1997–1999	→ Rostselmash-2 Rostov-on-Don	85	(22)
2000	Krasnoznamensk	36	(11)
2001	Zhemchuzhina Sochi	7	(0)
2001	Metallurg-Metiznik Magnitogorsk	13	(3)
2002	Torpedo-MAZ Minsk	25	(3)
2003	SKA-Energiya Khabarovsk	10	(1)
2004	Amur Blagoveshchensk	26	(11)
2005	Smena Komsomolsk-na-Amure	29	(11)
2006	Metallurg-Kuzbass Novokuznetsk	14	(1)
2006	Dynamo Vologda	13	(6)
2007	Nika Krasny Sulin		
2007	Volga Tver	9	(2)
2008	Zodiak Stary Oskol	9	(1)
2009	Bataysk-2007	1	(0)
2009	Sibiryak Bratsk	10	(0)

Managerial career
- 2018: FC Akademiya Futbola Rostov-on-Don
- 2018–2019: FC Chayka Peschanokopskoye (assistant)
- 2022: FC Chayka Peschanokopskoye (caretaker)
- 2022–2023: FC Chayka Peschanokopskoye (youth)
- 2023–: FC Zorkiy Krasnogorsk
- * Club domestic league appearances and goals

Andrei Nikolayevich Cherenkov (Russian: Андрей Николаевич Черенков; born 8 October 1976) is a Russian professional football manager and a former player. He is the manager of FC Zorkiy Krasnogorsk.

== Club career ==
He made his debut for FC Rostselmash Rostov-on-Don on 12 September 1998 in a Russian Cup game against FC Lada-Grad Dimitrovgrad. He made his second appearance for Rostselmash on 17 July 1999 in an Intertoto Cup game against Varaždin.

He played in the Russian Football National League for FC SKA-Energiya Khabarovsk in 2003.
