= Timur Bogatyryov =

Russian footballer

Personal information
- Full name: Timur Gadzhiyevich Bogatyryov
- Date of birth: August 4, 1965 (age 61)
- Place of birth: Kaspiysk, USSR
- Height: 1.80 m (5 ft 11 in)
- Positions: Forward; midfielder

Senior career*
Years	Team	Apps	(Gls)
1989–1990	FC Salyut Belgorod	62	(4)
1991–1992	FC Ritm Belgorod	72	(31)
1993	FC Zhemchuzhina Sochi	27	(9)
1993	FC Torpedo Adler	4	(2)
1994–1998	FC Zhemchuzhina Sochi	127	(28)
1998	FC Kuban Krasnodar	7	(0)
2000	FC Zhemchuzhina Sochi	24	(0)
2001	FC Terek Grozny	0	(0)

Managerial career
- 2009: FC Zhemchuzhina Sochi (youth team)
- * Club domestic league appearances and goals

Timur Gadzhiyevich Bogatyryov (Russian: Тимур Гаджиевич Богатырёв; born 4 August 1965) is a former Russian professional footballer.

== Club career ==
He made his professional debut in the Soviet Second League in 1989 for FC Salyut Belgorod.

He played 6 seasons in the Russian Premier League with FC Zhemchuzhina Sochi.
