= Vadim Khafizov =

Russian professional football coach (born 1970)

Personal information
- Full name: Vadim Feliksovich Khafizov
- Date of birth: 6 February 1970 (age 56)
- Place of birth: Engels, Russian SFSR

Managerial career
- Years: Team
- 1997–2002: Iskra Engels (administrator)
- 2002–2004: Iskra Engels
- 2005: Sokol Saratov (assistant)
- 2006–2007: Gubkin
- 2008: Gornyak Uchaly
- 2009: Nizhny Novgorod (technical director)
- 2010–2011: Nizhny Novgorod (assistant)
- 2012–2014: Khimik Dzerzhinsk
- 2015–2016: Khimki
- 2016–2017: Sokol Saratov
- 2018: Kyzyltash Bakhchisaray
- 2021–2022: Zenit-Izhevsk

Vadim Feliksovich Khafizov (Russian: Вадим Феликсович Хафизов; born 6 February 1970) is a Russian professional football coach.

== Honours ==
- Russian Professional Football League Zone West Best Manager: 2015–16.
