= Ilya Telegin =

Uzbekistani footballer

Personal information
- Full name: Ilya Igorevich Telegin
- Date of birth: 22 January 1981 (age 45)
- Height: 1.78 m (5 ft 10 in)
- Positions: Midfielder; striker

Youth career
- SDYuShOR Chirchiq

Senior career*
| Years | Team | Apps | (Gls) |
| 1997 | Umid Tashkent | | |
| 1998 | Chilanzar Tashkent | | |
| 1999 | PFC Navbahor Namangan | | |
| 2000–2002 | Kimyogar Chirchiq | 49 | (7) |
| 2003–2004 | FC Khimki | 38 | (4) |
| 2004 | FC Anzhi Makhachkala | 13 | (0) |
| 2005 | FC Metallurg Lipetsk | 19 | (2) |
| 2006 | Sokol-DSK Lipetsk | | |
| 2007–2009 | FC Metallurg Lipetsk | 83 | (12) |
| 2010 | FC Yelets (amateur) | | |
| 2010–2012 | FC Tekstilshchik Ivanovo | 35 | (10) |
| 2012 | FC Kooperator Vichuga | | |
| 2013 | FC Rodnik Parshinovka | | |
- * Club domestic league appearances and goals

Ilya Igorevich Telegin (Russian: Илья Игоревич Телегин; born 22 January 1981) is a former Uzbekistani professional football player. He also holds Russian citizenship.

== Club career ==
He made his Russian Football National League debut for FC Khimki on 10 April 2003 in a game against FC Neftekhimik Nizhnekamsk. He played 5 seasons in the FNL for Khimki, FC Anzhi Makhachkala and FC Metallurg Lipetsk.
