= Aleksandr Seredokhin =

Russian footballer

Personal information
- Full name: Aleksandr Vladimirovich Seredokhin
- Date of birth: 1 April 1977 (age 49)
- Place of birth: Maloyaroslavets, Kaluga Oblast, Russian SFSR
- Height: 1.83 m (6 ft 0 in)
- Positions: Midfielder; forward

Senior career*
Years	Team	Apps	(Gls)
1999–2001	FC Lokomotiv Kaluga	91	(32)
2001	FC Rubin Kazan	7	(0)
2004	FC Obninsk	32	(11)
2005	FC Avangard Kursk	15	(0)
2005–2006	FC Lokomotiv Kaluga	52	(12)
2007	FC Lobnya-Alla Lobnya	21	(4)
2008–2010	FC Zvezda Serpukhov	54	(4)
- * Club domestic league appearances and goals

Aleksandr Vladimirovich Seredokhin (Russian: Александр Владимирович Середохин; born 1 April 1977) is a former Russian professional football player.

== Club career ==
He played two seasons in the Russian Football National League for FC Rubin Kazan and FC Avangard Kursk.
