= Aleksei Latushkin =

Russian footballer

Personal information
- Full name: Aleksei Leonidovich Latushkin
- Date of birth: 24 June 1972 (age 54)
- Height: 1.88 m (6 ft 2 in)
- Position: Forward

Youth career
- FC Smena Komsomolsk-na-Amure

Senior career*
Years	Team	Apps	(Gls)
1989	FC Amur Komsomolsk-na-Amure	6	(0)
1993–1994	FC Amur Komsomolsk-na-Amure	24	(4)
1995–1996	FC Portovik Vladivostok		
1997	FC Luch Vladivostok	13	(2)
1998–1999	FC Viktoriya Komsomolsk-na-Amure		
2000–2001	FC Okean Nakhodka	41	(13)
2002–2006	FC Smena Komsomolsk-na-Amure	87	(17)
2008	FC Birobidzhan (amateur)		
2009	FC Smena Komsomolsk-na-Amure	0	(0)
- * Club domestic league appearances and goals

Aleksei Leonidovich Latushkin (Russian: Алексей Леонидович Латушкин; born 24 June 1972) is a former Russian professional football player.

== Club career ==
He played in the Russian Football National League for FC Luch Vladivostok in 1997.
