= Bazarny Karabulak =

Bazarny Karabulak Базарный Карабулак
- Urban-type settlement
- Interactive map of Bazarny Karabulak
- Location of Bazarny Karabulak Bazarny Karabulak (Saratov Oblast)
- Coordinates: 52.2771°N 46.4114°E
- Country: Russia
- Federal subject: Saratov Oblast
- Administrative district: Bazarno-Karabulaksky District
- Founded: 1692
- Elevation: 140 m (460 ft)

Population (2010 Census)
  - Total: 9,846
  - Estimate (2021): 9,134 (−7.2%)
- Time zone: UTC+4 (MSK+1)
- Postal code: 412601
- OKTMO ID: 63606151051

Bazarny Karabulak (Russian: База́рный Карабула́к) is an urban locality (an urban-type settlement) in Bazarno-Karabulaksky District of Saratov Oblast, Russia. Population: 9,846 (2010 census); 10,467 (2002 census); 10,320 (1989 Soviet census).
