= Yusup Guguyev =

Russian footballer and coach

Personal information
- Full name: Yusup Mukhtanovich Guguyev
- Date of birth: 30 July 1972 (age 54)
- Place of birth: Grozny, Russian SFSR
- Height: 1.84 m (6 ft 1/2 in)
- Position: Forward

Senior career*
Years	Team	Apps	(Gls)
1993–1994	FC Gigant Grozny	45	(7)
1995	FC Beshtau Lermontov	5	(1)
1996–2002	FC Angusht Nazran	231	(101)
2003	FC Avtodor Vladikavkaz	5	(0)
2003	FC Zhemchuzhina Sochi	18	(12)
2004–2006	FC Angusht Nazran	81	(25)

Managerial career
- 2010–2013: FC Angusht Nazran (assistant)
- 2017–2018: FC Angusht Nazran (assistant)
- * Club domestic league appearances and goals

Yusup Mukhtanovich Guguyev (Russian: Юсуп Мухтанович Гугуев; born 30 July 1972) is a Russian professional football coach and a former player.

== Club career ==
He made his Russian Football National League debut for FC Angusht Nazran on 26 March 2006 in a game against FC Terek Grozny. That was his only season in the FNL.

== Honours ==
- Russian Second Division Zone South top scorer: 1998 (29 goals), 2000 (30 goals).
