= Nikolai Kovardaev =

Russian footballer

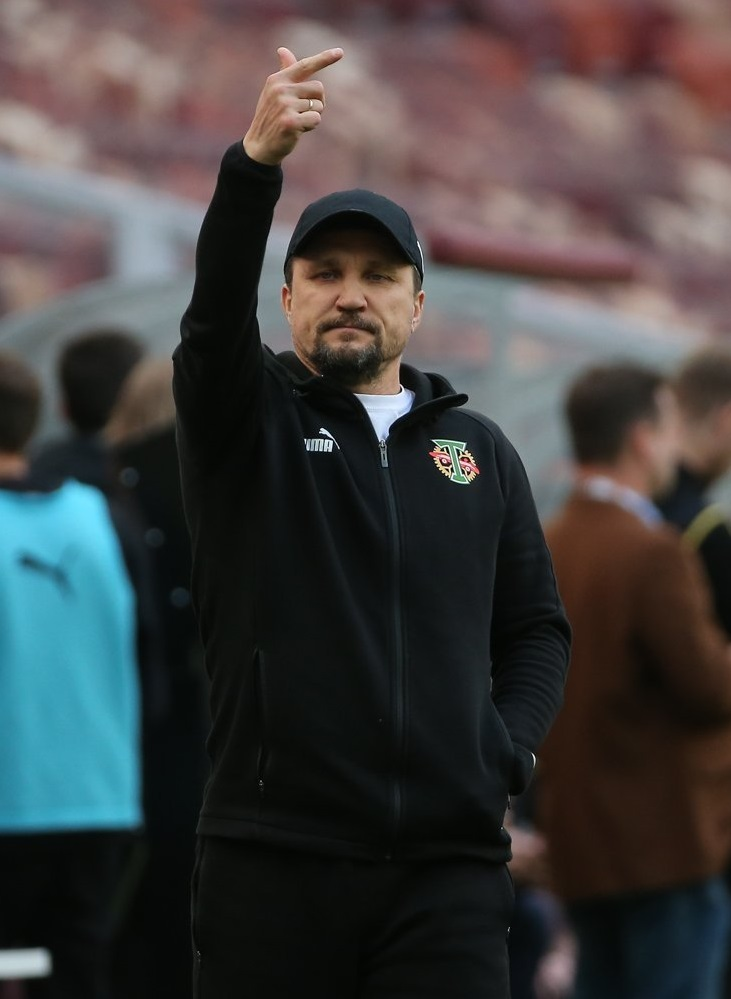
- Kovardaev with Torpedo Moscow in 2022

Personal information
- Full name: Nikolai Nikolayevich Kovardaev
- Date of birth: 24 September 1970 (age 56)
- Place of birth: Volokolamsk, Russian SFSR
- Height: 1.82 m (6 ft 0 in)
- Position: Forward

Team information
- Current team: Lokomotiv Moscow (women) (U-21)

Youth career
- SC EShVSM Moscow

Senior career*
Years	Team	Apps	(Gls)
1987	SC EShVSM Moscow	1	(0)
1988	FC Lokomotiv Moscow	0	(0)
1989–1991	FC Dynamo-2 Moscow	87	(15)
1992–1993	FC Dynamo Moscow	3	(0)
1992–1993	→ FC Dynamo-d Moscow	41	(20)
1993	FC Interros Moscow	22	(13)
1994–1996	FC Dynamo-Gazovik Tyumen	88	(21)
1997–1998	FC Uralan Elista	21	(3)
1999	FC Shinnik Yaroslavl	16	(2)
2000–2003	FC Khimki	98	(27)

Managerial career
- 2003–2004: FC Khimki (team supervisor)
- 2004–2006: FC Khimki (assistant)
- 2007: FC Khimki (U-21)
- 2008–2009: FC Saturn Moscow Oblast (U-21 assistant)
- 2009–2010: FC Saturn Moscow Oblast (assistant)
- 2011: FC Metalurh Donetsk (assistant)
- 2012: FC Dynamo Moscow (assistant)
- 2012–2013: FC Dynamo Moscow (U-21)
- 2013–2014: FC Dynamo Moscow (assistant)
- 2014–2015: FC Sibir Novosibirsk (assistant)
- 2015–2016: FC Mordovia Saransk (assistant)
- 2016: Academy FC Dynamo Moscow
- 2017: FC SKA-Khabarovsk (assistant)
- 2017: Academy FC Dynamo Moscow
- 2017–2019: Russia U-19
- 2017–2018: FC Dynamo Moscow (U-21)
- 2018: FC Dynamo Moscow (analyst)
- 2019: FC Khimik-Arsenal
- 2019–2020: FC Arsenal Tula (U-21)
- 2020: FC Arsenal Tula (assistant)
- 2020–2021: FC Arsenal Tula (U-21)
- 2022: FC Torpedo-2 Moscow
- 2022: FC Torpedo Moscow (assistant)
- 2022–2023: FC Torpedo-2 Moscow
- 2024–: Lokomotiv Moscow (women) (U-21)
- * Club domestic league appearances and goals

Nikolai Nikolayevich Kovardaev (Russian: Николай Николаевич Ковардаев; born 24 September 1970) is a Russian professional football coach and a former player who is the manager for the Under-21 squad of women's club Lokomotiv Moscow.

== Club career ==
He made his professional debut in the Soviet Second League in 1987 for SK EShVSM Moscow. He played 1 game in the UEFA Cup 1992–93 for FC Dynamo Moscow. He also played for FC Lokomotiv Moscow in 1988 in USSR Federation Cup.

== Coaching career ==
On 18 August 2022, Kovardaev was appointed as an assistant manager of the Russian Premier League club FC Torpedo Moscow.

== Honours ==
- Russian Premier League bronze: 1992, 1993.
