= Igor Bychkov (footballer) =

Russian footballer and coach

Personal information
- Full name: Igor Ivanovich Bychkov
- Date of birth: 19 April 1958
- Place of birth: Cheboksary, Chuvash ASSR
- Date of death: 7 June 2009 (aged 51)
- Height: 1.79 m (5 ft 10 1/2 in)
- Positions: Midfielder; forward

Senior career*
Years	Team	Apps	(Gls)
1975–1977	FC Druzhba Yoshkar-Ola	35	(4)
1977–1979	PFC CSKA Moscow	17	(0)
1980–1986	FC Iskra Smolensk	224	(13)
1987–1989	Pneumant Schmöckwitz		

International career
1977	Soviet Union (U20)	5	(0)

Managerial career
- 1998: FC Khimki
- * Club domestic league appearances and goals

Igor Ivanovich Bychkov (Russian: Игорь Иванович Бычков; 19 April 1958 – 8 June 2009) was a Russian professional football coach and a former player. He won the 1977 FIFA World Youth Championship with the Soviet Union national under-20 football team and was later awarded the Soviet title of Master of Sports.
