= Rustyam Fakhrutdinov =

Russian footballer

Personal information
- Full name: Rustyam Gusmanovich Fakhrutdinov
- Date of birth: 5 September 1963 (age 63)
- Place of birth: Zelenodolsk, Russian SFSR
- Height: 1.75 m (5 ft 9 in)
- Position: Forward

Youth career
- SOSh Zelenodolsk

Senior career*
| Years | Team | Apps | (Gls) |
| 1980–1983 | FC Avangard Zelenodolsk | | |
| 1984–1986 | FC Chaika Zelenodolsk (amateur) | | |
| 1987–1990 | FC Druzhba Yoshkar-Ola | 116 | (72) |
| 1991–1993 | FC Krylia Sovetov Samara | 75 | (32) |
| 1993 | FC KAMAZ Naberezhnye Chelny | 15 | (4) |
| 1994–1995 | FC Krylia Sovetov Samara | 21 | (1) |
| 1995–1997 | FC Neftekhimik Nizhnekamsk | 110 | (44) |
| 1998 | FC Nosta Novotroitsk | 23 | (9) |
| 1999 | FC Lada Togliatti | 33 | (13) |
| 2000 | FC Neftekhimik Nizhnekamsk | 27 | (21) |
| 2001–2002 | FC Balakovo | 24 | (10) |
- * Club domestic league appearances and goals

Rustyam Gusmanovich Fakhrutdinov (Tatar: Рөстәм Госман улы Фәхретдинев, Russian: Рустям Гусманович Фахрутдинов; born 5 September 1963) is a Russian former professional footballer.

== Club career ==
He made his professional debut in the Soviet Second League in 1988 for FC Druzhba Yoshkar-Ola. He scored the first goal of FC Krylia Sovetov Samara in the Russian Premier League on 9 April 1992 in a game against FC Asmaral Moscow.
