= Dmitri Pinin =

Russian footballer and coach

Personal information
- Full name: Dmitri Vladimirovich Pinin
- Date of birth: 6 September 1975 (age 51)
- Place of birth: Lyudinovo, Russian SFSR
- Height: 1.84 m (6 ft 1/2 in)
- Position: Forward

Youth career
- 1991–1994: Avangard Lyudinovo

Senior career*
Years	Team	Apps	(Gls)
1995–2000	Spartak-Orekhovo Orekhovo-Zuyevo	187	(27)
2001–2002	Torpedo-MAZ Minsk	31	(0)
2003	Dynamo Vologda	30	(0)
2004	Nara-Desna Naro-Fominsk	30	(5)
2005–2007	Saturn Yegoryevsk	87	(14)
2008–2010	Znamya Truda Orekhovo-Zuyevo	84	(10)
2013	Master-Saturn Yegoryevsk	6	(1)

Managerial career
- 2012: Saturn-2 Moscow Oblast (assistant)
- * Club domestic league appearances and goals

Dmitri Vladimirovich Pinin (Russian: Дмитрий Владимирович Пинин; born 6 September 1975) is a Russian professional football coach and a former player.
