= FC Khimki =

Russian football club

Khimki
- Full name: City District Khimki Municipality's Autonomous Institution "Football Club Khimki"
- Nickname: Krasno-chyornye (The Red-Blacks)
- Founded: January 30, 1997; 29 years ago
- Dissolved: June 18, 2025; 15 months ago
- Ground: Arena Khimki
- Capacity: 18,636
- Owner: Khimki
- 2024–25: Russian Premier League, 12th of 16 (administratively relegated)
- Website: fckhimki.ru
Home colours	Away colours	Third colours

FC Khimki (Russian: ФК "Химки") was a Russian professional football club based in Khimki, about 18 kilometres north west of central Moscow, the capital of Russia.

== History ==
The team was formed in 1996 by merging two amateur clubs from Khimki, Rodina, and Novator. Khimki entered the amateur league and played their first official match on 17 May 1997. Of more than 150 amateur teams in the competition, only the champions would be promoted to the Third League. Khimki won the tournament, overcoming Energiya Ulyanovsk in the final match in a penalty shootout.

On 30 January 1997, Khimki became a professional football club. In the Third League regional tournament, Khimki finished second and were promoted to the Second League.

Khimki were promoted to the First Division after the 2000 season. They finished first in the Centre zone of the Second Division, but lost the promotion play-off to Severstal Cherepovets on away goals. After Severstal refused to play in the First Division, their place was given to Khimki.

In 2005, Khimki had a very good run in the Russian Cup, reaching the final. They lost the final match 0–1 to CSKA. In the 2019–20 Russian Cup, they reached the final once again.

On 15 May 2020, FNL season was abandoned due to the COVID-19 pandemic in Russia. As the club was in the 2nd position in the standings, they were promoted to the Russian Premier League for the 2020–21 season, returning to the top level after an 11-year break.

On 22 May 2023, Khimki were relegated from the Russian Premier League after three seasons.

On 20 May 2024, Khimki secured return to the top tier after one season down.

Khimki finished the 2024–25 Russian Premier League season in 12th place, outside of the relegation zone. However, on 24 May 2025 Russian Football Union announced that the club was not issued the 2025–26 RPL license due to accumulated debts, sealing their administrative relegation. Their replacement in the Premier League was FC Pari Nizhny Novgorod. Khimki were officially dissolved on 18 June 2025.

=== League history ===
Season	Div.	Pos.	Pl.	W	D	L	GS	GA	P	Cup	Europe	Top scorer (League)	Head Coach
1997	4th, Zone 3	2	40	26	6	8	80	38	84	-	—	(Russia) Kravchuk – 17	(Russia) Shtapov
1998	3rd, "West"	10	40	15	8	17	63	60	53	-	—	(Russia) Georgievsky – 11	(Russia) Dementyev (Russia) Bychkov (Russia) Sabitov
1999	3rd, "Centre"	6	36	17	11	8	51	35	62	R256	—	(Russia) Khamzin – 11	(Russia) Sabitov (Russia) Kots
2000	3rd, "Centre"	1	38	28	4	6	68	22	88	R64	—	(Russia) Genich – 18	(Russia) Piskaryov (Russia) Papaev
2001	2nd	12	34	13	4	17	42	54	43	R32	—	(Ukraine) Shcheglov – 5 (Russia) Voronkov – 5 (Russia) Kovardayev – 5	(Russia) Petrushin (Russia) Sabitov
2002	2nd	7	34	14	10	10	38	27	52	R32	—	(Russia) Kovardayev – 6	(Russia) Sabitov (Russia) Derkach
2003	2nd	12	42	16	9	17	36	46	57	QF	—	(Russia) Kiselyov – 15	(Russia) Derkach (Russia) Galyamin
2004	2nd	5	42	17	10	15	39	33	61	R32	—	(Russia) Pogrebnyak – 6	(Ukraine) Shevchuk (Ukraine) Yakovenko
2005	2nd	4	42	23	13	6	75	36	82	RU	—	(Russia) Tikhonov – 15	(Ukraine) Yakovenko
2006	2nd	1	42	30	9	3	83	30	99	R64	—	(Russia) Tikhonov – 22	(Russia) Kazachyonok
2007	1st	9	30	9	10	11	32	33	37	R32	—	(Russia) Shirokov – 7	(Serbia) Muslin
2008	1st	14	30	6	9	15	34	54	27	R16	—	(Russia) Nizamutdinov – 9	(Russia) Yuran
2009	1st	16	30	2	4	24	20	64	10	R32	—	(Russia) Antipenko – 6	(Russia) Sarsaniya (Russia) Chugainov
2010	2nd	13	38	11	17	10	39	38	50	R32	—	(Russia) Yusupov – 7 (Ukraine) Dudchenko – 7	(Russia) Tarkhanov (Russia) Bushmanov
2011–12	2nd	13	48	16	11	21	54	74	59	R32	—	(Russia) Mamtov – 10	(Russia) Grigoryan (Russia) Dolmatov (Russia) Tarkhanov
2012–13	2nd	16	32	6	10	16	23	40	28	R16	—	(Russia) Komkov – 3 (Russia) Khatazhyonkov – 3	(Russia) Tarkhanov (Russia) Tetradze (Russia) Petrakov
2013–14	3rd, "West"	3	32	16	10	6	67	37	58	R64	—	(Russia) Antonnikov – 9 (Russia) Zemchenkov – 9	(Russia) Tarkhanov (Russia) Mukhanov (Russia) Gridin
2014–15	3rd, "West"	4	30	15	9	6	42	27	54	R256	—	(Russia) Lipatkin – 6	(Russia) (Uzbekistan) Maminov
2015–16	3rd, "West"	1	24	19	5	0	49	12	62	R16	—	(Russia) (Armenia) Markosov – 11	(Russia) Khafizov
2016–17	2nd	11	38	11	16	11	40	47	49	R32	—	(Russia) Kazaev – 8	(Russia) Irkhin
2017–18	2nd	13	38	12	7	19	33	49	43	R64	—	(Russia) Kuzmichev – 7	(Russia) Irkhin
2018–19	2nd	9	38	14	11	13	47	49	53	R32	—	(Russia) Kukharchuk – 10	(Russia) Shalimov
2019–20	2nd	2	27	16	6	5	50	19	54	RU	—	(Russia) (Azerbaijan) Aliyev – 8	(Russia) Yuran
2020–21	1st	8	30	13	6	11	35	39	45	R16	—	(Russia) Mirzov – 6	(Russia) Yuran
2021–22	1st	13	30	7	11	12	34	47	32	GS	—	(Russia) Glushakov – 10	(Tajikistan) Cherevchenko

== Notable players ==
Had international caps for their respective countries. Players whose name is listed in bold represented their countries while playing for Khimki.

Europe

Russia

- (Russia) **Zelimkhan Bakayev**
- (Russia) Vladimir Beschastnykh
- (Russia) Viktor Budyanskiy
- (Russia) Aleksei Bugayev
- (Russia) Andrei Chichkin
- (Russia) Denis Davydov
- (Russia) Yuri Drozdov
- (Russia) Georgi Dzhikiya
- (Russia) Denis Glushakov
- (Russia) Maksim Glushenkov
- (Russia) Valeri Kleimyonov
- (Russia) Andrei Kondrashov
- (Russia) Fyodor Kudryashov
- (Russia) Ilya Lantratov
- (Russia) Arseniy Logashov
- (Russia) Ilya Maksimov
- (Russia) Pavel Mamayev
- (Russia) Anton Mitryushkin
- (Russia) Pavel Mogilevets
- (Russia) Andrei Mostovoy
- (Russia) Elmir Nabiullin
- (Russia) Sergei Nekrasov
- (Russia) Pavel Pogrebnyak
- (Russia) Denis Popov
- (Russia) Igor Portnyagin
- (Russia) Aleksandr Ryazantsev
- (Russia) Roman Shirokov
- (Russia) Sergei Terekhov
- (Russia) Andrey Tikhonov
- (Russia) Yegor Titov
- (Russia) **Roman Vorobyov**
- (Russia) Renat Yanbayev
- (Russia) Andrey Yeshchenko
- (Russia) Artur Yusupov
- (Russia) Anton Zabolotny
- (Russia) Yuri Zhirkov

Armenia

- (Armenia) **Artak Aleksanyan**
- (Armenia) **Roman Berezovsky**
- (Armenia) Barsegh Kirakosyan
- (Armenia) **Arshak Koryan**
- (Armenia) **Artur Yedigaryan**
- (Armenia) **Robert Zebelyan**

Azerbaijan

- (Azerbaijan) **Emin Agaev**
- (Azerbaijan) Kamran Aliyev

Belarus

- (Belarus) Dmitry Aliseiko
- (Belarus) **Timofei Kalachev**
- (Belarus) **Kirill Kaplenko**
- (Belarus) Dzyanis Kowba
- (Belarus) **Artsyom Radzkow**
- (Belarus) Maksim Romaschenko

Bosnia and Herzegovina

- (Bosnia and Herzegovina) **Dragan Blatnjak**
- (Bosnia and Herzegovina) Ricardo Santos Lago
- (Bosnia and Herzegovina) Vule Trivunović
- (Bosnia and Herzegovina) Zoran Amidžić

Czech Republic

- (Czech Republic) Tomas Vychodil

Estonia

- (Estonia) **Andrei Stepanov**
- (Estonia) **Vladimir Voskoboinikov**

Finland

- (Finland) Boris Rotenberg

Georgia

- (Georgia (country)) Valeri Abramidze
- (Georgia (country)) **Gogita Gogua**
- (Georgia (country)) **Giorgi Lomaia**
- (Georgia (country)) Giorgi Navalovski
- (Georgia (country)) Edik Sadzhaya
- (Georgia (country)) Georgi Mikadze
- (Georgia (country)) Vladimir Gogberashvili

Kazakhstan

- (Kazakhstan) **Islambek Kuat**
- (Kazakhstan) **Dmitriy Lyapkin**
- (Kazakhstan) **Roman Uzdenov**

Latvia

- (Latvia) **Oskars Kļava**

Lithuania

- (Lithuania) Darius Miceika
- (Lithuania) Mantas Samusiovas
- (Lithuania) **Valdas Trakys**

Moldova

- (Moldova) **Victor Golovatenco**
- (Moldova) Oleg Hromtov
- (Moldova) **Iurie Priganiuc**
- (Moldova) **Radu Rebeja**
- (Moldova) Oleg Shishkin

Romania

- (Romania) Florin Costin Șoavă

Serbia

- (Serbia) **Dragan Mrđa**

Slovakia

- (Slovakia) **Martin Jakubko**

Slovenia

- (Slovenia) **Nastja Čeh**

Sweden

- (Sweden) Filip Dagerstål

Ukraine

- (Ukraine) Serhiy Danylovskyi
- (Ukraine) Dmytro Parfenov

Asia

Turkmenistan

- (Turkmenistan) **Vladimir Bayramov**

Uzbekistan

- (Uzbekistan) Igor Golban
- (Uzbekistan) **Vladimir Shishelov**
- (Uzbekistan) Ilya Telegin

Africa

Burkina Faso

- (Burkina Faso) **Mohamed Konaté**

Morocco

- (Morocco) Abdelillah Bagui

Nigeria

- (Nigeria) **Richard Eromoigbe**
- (Nigeria) Brian Idowu
- (Nigeria) Chidi Osuchukwu

Senegal

- (Senegal) Dame Diop

South & Central America

Panama

- (Panama) **Edgardo Fariña**

== Club records ==
As of 3 August 2010

=== Most league appearances ===
1. (Serbia) Miodrag Jovanović: 224
2. (Armenia) Roman Berezovsky: 175
3. (Russia) Nikolai Barkalov: 164
4. (Russia) Sergei Kravchuk: 145
5. (Russia) Aleksandr Shulenin: 140
6. (Russia) Andrey Tikhonov: 124
7. (Russia) Aleksandr Makarov: 119
8. (Russia) Aleksandr Shvetsov: 116
9. (Russia) Igor Nekrasov: 115
10. (Ukraine) (Russia) Sergei Shcheglov: 112

=== Most league goals ===
1. Sergei Kravchuk: 46
2. Andrey Tikhonov: 43
3. Yuri Georgiyevsky: 30
4. Konstantin Genich: 29
5. Nikolai Kovardayev: 27
6. Vadim Shatalin: 23
7. Aleksandr Antipenko: 20
8. Denis Kiselyov: 18
9. Anton Arkhipov: 16

== Final coaching staff ==
Position	Staff
Manager	(Russia) Magomed Adiyev
Assistant manager	(Russia) Aleksandr Alkhazov
Assistant manager	(Russia) Filipp Sokolinskiy
Goalkeeper coach	(Russia) Aleksandr Guteyev
Fitness coach	(Kazakhstan) Yerlan Ibraim
Doctor	(Russia) Nikita Konovalov
Masseur	(Russia) Aleksey Lyashchenko

== Managers ==
- Vladimir Shtapov (1996–97)
- Igor Bychkov (1997, interim)
- Ravil Sabitov (1997–99), (2001–02)
- Alexandr Piskarev (2000)
- Viktor Papayev (2000)
- Aleksei Petrushin (2001)
- Sergey Derkach (2002–03)
- Dmitry Galyamin (2003)
- Vasily Kulkov (2004)
- Vladimir Shevchuk (2004)
- Pavel Yakovenko (2004–05)
- Vladimir Kazachyonok (2006–07)
- Slavoljub Muslin (2007–08)
- Sergei Yuran (2008)
- Konstantin Sarsania (2009)
- Igor Chugainov (2009)
- Alexander Tarkhanov (2009–10)
- Oleg Dolmatov (2011–12)
- Alexander Tarkhanov (2012)
- Valeriy Petrakov (2012–13)
- Alexander Tarkhanov (2013)
- Vladimir Mukhanov (2013–14)
- Vladimir Maminov (2014–15)
- Vadim Khafizov (2015–16)
- Aleksandr Irkhin (2016–18)
- Igor Shalimov (2018–19)
- Andrei Talalayev (2019–20)
- Sergei Yuran (2020)
- Dmitri Gunko (2020)
- Igor Cherevchenko (2020–2021)

== Honours ==
- Russian National Football League
  - Winners: 2006
- Russian Professional Football League
  - Winners: 2000 (Centre), 2015–16 (West)
