= Viktor Rodionov =

Soviet actor

- Born: Viktor Iosiphovich Rodionov; 22 July 1924; Mariinsky Posad, Chuvashia, RSFSR, Soviet Union
- Died: 19 May 1987 (aged 62); Cheboksary, Chuvashia
- Other name: Actor
- Education: Chuvash State Academic Drama Theatre
- Years active: 1947–1987
- Awards: People's Artist of the RSFSR; Stanislavsky State Prize of the RSFSR

Viktor Iosiphovich Rodionov (Russian: Виктор Иосифович Родионов; 1924–1987) was a Soviet theater actor, musician, and Chuvash radio announcer. He received the title of the People's Artist of the RSFSR on 23 June 1980, and the People's Artist of the Chuvash ASSR (1968). He was a Laureate of the Stanislavsky State Prize of the RSFSR (1971).

== Biography ==
Born on July 22, 1924, in the city of Mariinsky Posad (Chuvashia). He graduated from the Chuvash State Music School (1941, cello and composition class), the Chuvash Studio of the State Institute of Theater Arts (1947). He worked as a musician and auxiliary artist (1941-1942), as an artist (1947-1987) of the Chuvash State Academic Drama Theatre. During his work in the theater, he played more than 350 roles. For 11 years, he worked as a part-time announcer of the Chuvash radio and the Cheboksary television Studio.

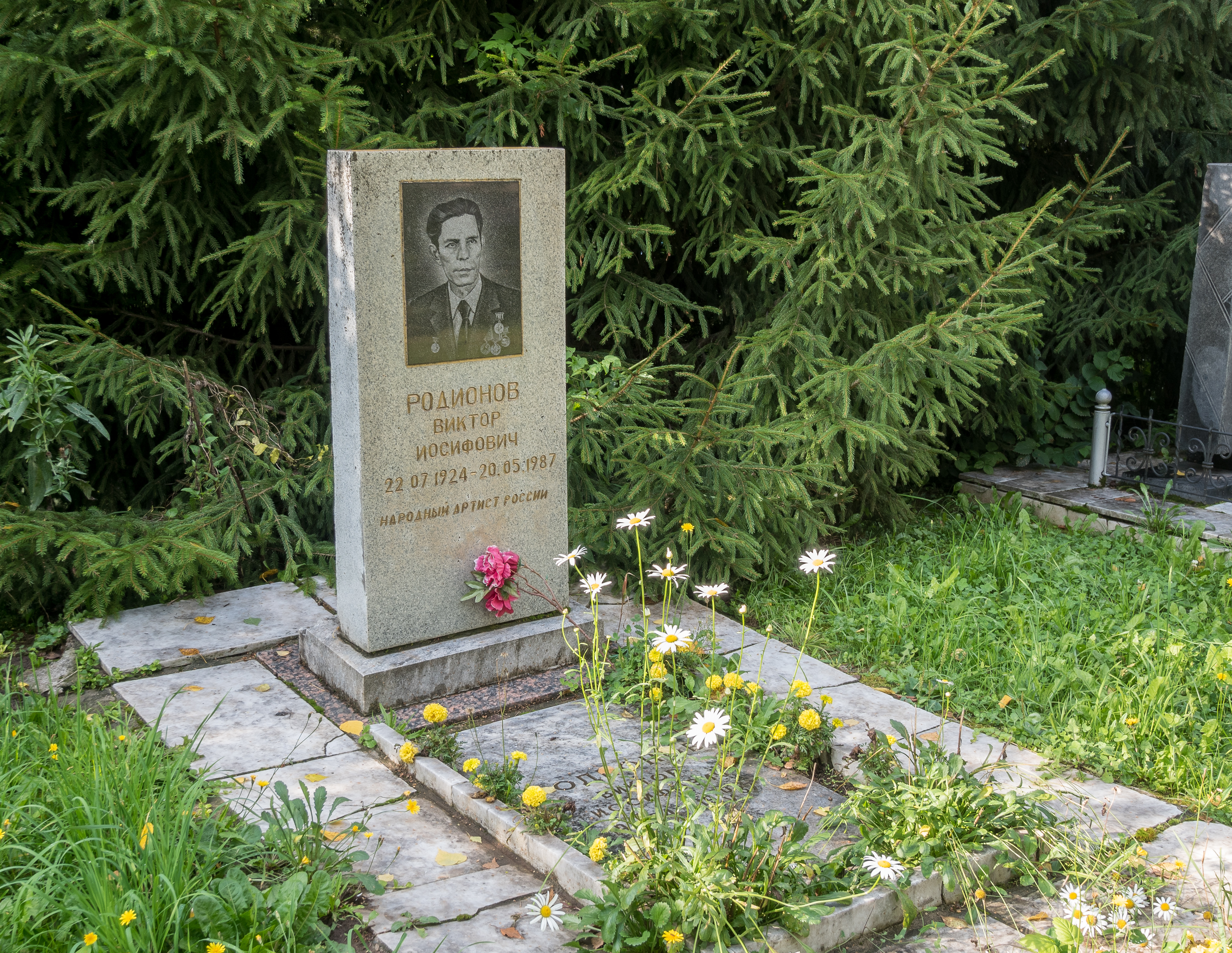
Rodionov's Grave in Cheboksary

Rodionov participated in radio and TV shows and dubbed films into the Chuvash language. Rodionov's musical compositions were performed in 21 performances of the CHGADT. In 1954-1968 and 1970-1986 — Chairman of the Chuvash branch of the Union of Theatre Workers of the Russian Federation.

Rodionov died on May 19, 1987 in Cheboksary. He was buried in the memorial cemetery of Cheboksary.

== Literature ==
- Pavel Romanov, Студийцы.— Чебоксары: Чуваш.кн.изд-во, 1982.— С91.
- Lyudmila Vdovtseva. Для театра рождённый: очерк о творчестве артиста Родионова Виктора Иосифовича /Людмила Вдовцева // Талант — всегда загадка: очерки,— Чебоксары: Чуваш. кн. изд-во, 1984.— С.34-С.55.
