= Vitali Kakunin =

Russian footballer

Personal information
- Full name: Vitali Nikolayevich Kakunin
- Date of birth: 9 May 1979 (age 47)
- Place of birth: Korneyevka, North Kazakhstan Region, Kazakh SSR
- Height: 1.78 m (5 ft 10 in)
- Position: Forward

Senior career*
Years	Team	Apps	(Gls)
1997–1999	FC UralAZ Miass	40	(14)
2000–2001	FC Neftekhimik Nizhnekamsk	66	(37)
2002	FC Rubin Kazan	5	(0)
2003	FC Metallurg-Kuzbass Novokuznetsk	5	(1)
2003	FC Lisma-Mordovia Saransk	8	(0)
2005–2006	FC Zenit Chelyabinsk	35	(2)
- * Club domestic league appearances and goals

Vitali Nikolayevich Kakunin (Russian: Виталий Николаевич Какунин; born 9 May 1979) is a retired Russian professional football player.

== Honours ==
- Russian First Division top scorer: 2001 (20 goals).
