= FC Volgar Astrakhan =

Russian football club

Volgar FC
- Full name: Volgar Football Club
- Founded: 1960; 66 years ago
- Ground: Central Stadium, Astrakhan
- Capacity: 21,500
- Owner: Astrakhan Oblast
- CEO: Andrey Nikitin
- Manager: Igor Kolyvanov
- League: Russian Second League; Division A Gold Group
- 2025–26: Second stage: 6th
- Website: www.volgar-fc.ru
Home colours	Away colours

Volgar FC (Russian: Футбольный Клуб "Волгарь") is an association football club based in Astrakhan, Russia. They play in the Russian Second League Division A (third tier).

== History ==
The club has been known under following names:

- Pishchevik (food industry worker) (1925−1958)
- Trud (labour) (1958–59)
- Volgar (1960–94) (2012–)
- Volgar-Gazprom (1995–2007), (2010–2012)
- Volgar-Gazprom-2 (2007–10)

Pishchevik played in the Second Group of the Soviet League. Trud (and later Volgar) played in the Class B (1958, 1960–1967), in Class A, Group 2 (1968–1969), in Class A, Group 1 (1970), Soviet First League (1971), Soviet Second League (1972–1990), Soviet Second League B (1991). In 1992 Volgar entered the Russian Second League, played in the Third League in 1994 (finished top and were promoted), returned to the Second League in 1995 and stayed until 1998. In 1998 Volgar-Gazprom were promoted and in 1999 they started playing in the Russian First Division. With the exception of the relegation for the 2004 season, Volgar-Gazprom had been in the First Division until 2006. The club was denied the professional licence and thus relegated to amateur level in 2007. Another club was organized called FC Volgar-Gazprom-2. The new club advanced to the Russian First Division for the 2009 season.

After the 2017–18 season, the club experienced financial difficulties and decided to be voluntarily relegated to the third-tier PFL.

On 15 May 2020, the 2019–20 PFL season was abandoned due to COVID-19 pandemic in Russia. As Volgar was leading in their PFL zone at the time, they were promoted to the second-tier FNL for the 2020–21 season.

On 20 May 2024, Volgar was relegated to the Russian Second League. In the 2024–25 season, Volgar qualified to the promotion play-offs which they lost in a penalty shoot-out to FC Chelyabinsk.

== Current squad ==
As of 11 September 2026, according to the Russian Second League website.

Note: Flags indicate national team as defined under FIFA eligibility rules; some limited exceptions apply. Players may hold more than one non-FIFA nationality.

No.	Pos.	Nation	Player
1	GK	RUS	Vladislav Yampolsky
5	MF	RUS	Mikhail Strelnik
7	MF	RUS	Aleksei Pavlishin
8	MF	RUS	Danil Poluboyarinov
9	FW	RUS	Aleksandr Chupayov
10	FW	RUS	Vladislav Morozov
11	MF	RUS	Aleksandr Nosov
13	DF	RUS	Dmitri Ivanov
14	FW	RUS	Amin Radzhabov
17	FW	RUS	Dmitri Lesnikov
19	MF	RUS	Kirill Kolesnichenko
23	DF	RUS	Yury Petrovsky
25	DF	RUS	Artyom Yuran

No.	Pos.	Nation	Player
26	DF	RUS	Danil Pelikh
28	DF	RUS	Yegor Proshkin
34	MF	RUS	Oleg Dmitriyev
35	GK	RUS	Svyatoslav Shtanov
47	DF	RUS	Alan Agayev (on loan from Rodina Moscow)
57	FW	RUS	Vyacheslav Krotov
58	DF	RUS	Ilya Zuyev
62	DF	RUS	Yevgeny Kovalevsky (on loan from Krasnodar)
67	DF	RUS	Kirill Volkov
69	MF	RUS	Danil Anosov (on loan from Sochi)
71	GK	RUS	Aleksei Mamin (on loan from Ural Yekaterinburg)
93	GK	RUS	Yaroslav Solovyov

=== Out on loan ===
Note: Flags indicate national team as defined under FIFA eligibility rules; some limited exceptions apply. Players may hold more than one non-FIFA nationality.

No.	Pos.	Nation	Player
—	FW	RUS	Danil Goryayev (at Astrakhan until 31 December 2026)

== Notable past players ==
Had international caps for their respective countries. Players whose name is listed in bold represented their countries while playing for Volgar.

Russia/USSR

- (Soviet Union) Rinat Dasayev
- (Soviet Union) (Russia) Dmitry Kuznetsov
- (Soviet Union) Vasili Zhupikov
- (Russia) Mingiyan Beveyev
- (Russia) Viktor Bulatov
- (Russia) Ruslan Kambolov
- (Russia) Vladimir Lebed
- (Russia) Ramiz Mamedov
- (Russia) Yevgeny Morozov
- (Russia) Gennadiy Nizhegorodov
- (Russia) Aleksei Sutormin
- (Russia) Sergei Terekhov
- (Russia) Vladislav Ternavsky
- (Russia) Dmitry Vorobyov
- (Russia) Anton Zabolotny

Former USSR countries

- (Armenia) Garnik Avalyan

- (Armenia) Stanislav Buchnev
- (Armenia) Manuk Kakosyan
- (Armenia) Tigran Petrosyan
- (Armenia) David Yurchenko
- (Azerbaijan) Gurban Gurbanov
- (Belarus) Barys Haravoy
- (Belarus) **Vasily Khomutovsky**
- (Kazakhstan) Vitaliy Abramov
- (Kazakhstan) Konstantin Ledovskikh
- (Kazakhstan) Almir Mukhutdinov
- (Kazakhstan) Roman Uzdenov
- (Latvia) **Aleksandrs Isakovs**
- (Latvia) **Valērijs Ivanovs**
- (Latvia) **Ivans Lukjanovs**
- (Latvia) Igors Sļesarčuks
- (Lithuania) **Artūras Fomenka**
- (Lithuania) Tadas Gražiūnas
- (Lithuania) Nerijus Radžius

- (Moldova) Ilie Cebanu
- (Moldova) Alexandr Covalenco
- (Moldova) **Stanislav Namașco**
- (Tajikistan) **Farkhod Vosiyev**
- (Ukraine) Oleksandr Svystunov
- (Uzbekistan) Sergey Andreyev
- (Uzbekistan) Gennadiy Sharipov

Danila Yashchuck

Europe

- (Bosnia and Herzegovina) Dželaludin Muharemović
- (Czech Republic) Luboš Kalouda
- (Slovakia) Marek Hollý
- (Slovenia) Andrej Pečnik
