= Ravil Sabitov =

Russian footballer

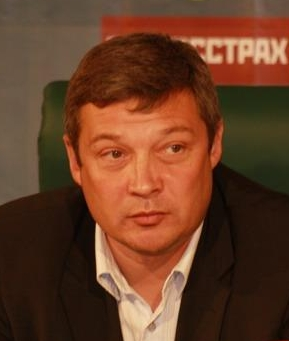
- Ravil Sabitov in 2008

Personal information
- Full name: Ravil Rufailovich Sabitov
- Date of birth: 8 March 1968 (age 58)
- Place of birth: Moscow, Soviet Union
- Height: 1.84 m (6 ft 1/2 in)
- Position: Defender

Team information
- Current team: AFA Olaine (assistant coach)

Youth career
- FC Dynamo Moscow

Senior career*
Years	Team	Apps	(Gls)
1985–1990	FC Dynamo Moscow	15	(0)
1990	FC Dinamo Sukhumi	28	(0)
1991–1993	FC Lokomotiv Moscow	70	(1)
1994	K.S.V. Waregem	8	(0)
1995–1996	FC Dynamo Moscow	19	(2)
Total		140	(3)

Managerial career
- 1997–1998: FC Khimki (assistant)
- 1998–1999: FC Khimki
- 2000–2001: FC Titan Reutov
- 2001: FC Khimki (assistant)
- 2001–2002: FC Khimki
- 2003–2007: Russia U-19
- 2007–2008: FC Torpedo Moscow
- 2009: FC Maccabi Moscow
- 2009–2011: FC Tobol
- 2011–2012: FK Daugava Daugavpils
- 2013–2014: FC Myllypuro
- 2015: FC Sakhalin Yuzhno-Sakhalinsk
- 2015–2016: FC Tekstilshchik Ivanovo
- 2017–2018: FK Jelgava
- 2019: FC Zvezda Perm (consultant)
- 2019: FC Akhmat Grozny (assistant)
- 2020: Riga FC
- 2020–2021: Riga FC (academy)
- 2021–2022: Salaspils
- 2024–: AFA Olaine (assistant)
- * Club domestic league appearances and goals

Ravil Rufailovich Sabitov (Russian: Равиль Руфаилович Сабитов; born 8 March 1968) is a Russian professional football coach and a former player. He is an assistant coach with the Latvian club AFA Olaine.

== Club career ==
As a player, he made his debut in the Soviet Top League in 1989 for FC Dynamo Moscow.

== Honours ==
- Soviet Top League bronze: 1990.
- Russian Cup winner: 1995.

== European club competitions ==
- UEFA Cup 1993–94 with FC Lokomotiv Moscow: 2 games.
- UEFA Cup Winners' Cup 1995–96 with FC Dynamo Moscow: 1 game.
