= FC Zhemchuzhina-Sochi =

Zhemchuzhina-Sochi
- Full name: Football Club Zhemchuzhina-Sochi
- Founded: 1991
- Dissolved: 2012
- Ground: Sochi Central Stadium
- Capacity: 10,200
- President: Dmitry Yakushev
- 2011–12: withdrew from FNL
Home colours	Away colours

FC Zhemchuzhina-Sochi (Russian: ФК Жемчужина-Сочи) was a Russian association football club based in Sochi, Krasnodar Krai founded in 1991 and dissolved in 2012.

== History ==
Zhemchuzhina Sochi was founded in 1991 and named after a hotel which was one of the founders. Zhemchuzhina is Russian for "a pearl". Zhemchuzhina spent one season in the Soviet Second League B (winning zonal tournament), but were entitled to enter Russian First Division in 1992, after the dissolution of the Soviet Union. Zhemchuzhina won the tournament in their zone and were promoted to the Russian Top Division. They spent 7 seasons there, from 1993 to 1999. After another season in the First Division in 2000 Zhemchuzhina went straight down to the Second Division. The club was disbanded after the 2003 season due to financial problems.

In 2004, a new club, Sochi-04, was formed in place of Zhemchuzhina. The former head of Zhemchuzhina, Oleg Shinkaryov, became a chairman of Sochi-04.

=== Rebirth ===
In 2007, club was re-established under name "Zhemchuzhina-A". Arsen Naydyonov became manager and vice-president of club. "Zhemchuzhina-A" played in Amateur Football League South zone, the 4th highest-level in 2007. It finished 2nd this league and promoted to South Zone of Russian Second Division for 2008 season. In 2008, it was renamed to FC Zhemchuzhina-Sochi. It promoted to the Russian First Division the 2010 season as champions of South Zone after 9 seasons of absence.

In August 2011 the team withdrew from Russian First Division (FNL).

== League history ==
Season	Div.	Pos.	Pl.	W	D	L	GS	GA	P	Cup	Europe	Top Scorer (League)	Head Coach
1991	4th, Zone 4	1	42	27	10	5	91	33	64	—	—	(Soviet Union) Makeev - 24	(Soviet Union) Naydyonov
1992	2nd, "West"	1	34	24	5	5	84	40	53	—	—	(Georgia (country)) Gogrichiani - 26	(Russia) Naydyonov
1993	1st	13	34	10	10	14	52	62	30	R64	—	(Georgia (country)) Gogrichiani - 13	(Russia) Naydyonov
1994	1st	9	30	8	11	11	44	48	27	R32	—	(Russia) Filimonov - 9	(Russia) Naydyonov
1995	1st	13	30	8	4	18	36	69	28	R16	—	(Russia) Bogatyryov - 10	(Russia) Naydyonov
1996	1st	15	34	10	6	18	38	57	36	R16	—	(Russia) 3x players - 6	(Russia) Naydyonov
1997	1st	14	34	11	7	16	38	51	40	R32	—	(Georgia (country)) Gogrichiani - 7	(Russia) Naydyonov
1998	1st	13	30	9	8	13	31	48	35	R32	—	(Georgia (country)) Gogrichiani - 4 (Russia) Kutarba - 4	(Russia) Baidachny
1999	1st	15	30	5	11	14	29	55	26	R16	—	(Russia) Demenko - 5 (Belarus) Kovalenko - 5	(Russia) Baidachny (Russia) Antikhovich
2000	2nd	17	38	12	7	19	48	70	43	R32	—	(Georgia (country)) Gogrichiani - 7 (Azerbaijan) Suleymanov - 7	(Russia) Naydyonov
2001	3rd, "South"	9	38	16	6	16	59	47	54	R32	—	(Armenia) Avetisyan - 18	(Russia) Sekech
2002	3rd, "South"	11	40	16	6	18	60	51	54	R256	—	(Russia) Nikulin - 12	(Azerbaijan) Suleymanov
2003	3rd, "South"	18	38	9	5	24	36	66	32	R512	—	(Russia) Guguyev - 12	(Russia) Naydyonov (Russia) Bondaruk
2004	—									R512	—		
2004–2007
2007	LFL(4th), "South"	2	30	19	3	8	53	27	60	—	—		(Russia) Naydyonov
2008	3rd, "South"	6	34	14	12	8	48	30	54	—	—	(Russia) Pinchuk - 15	(Georgia (country)) Gogrichiani
2009	3rd, "South"	1	34	29	2	3	91	22	89	R1024	—	(Russia) Dubrovin - 22	(Russia) Vasilenko
2010	2nd	8	38	16	9	13	45	44	57	R64	—	(Armenia) Zebelyan - 6 (Russia) Demenko - 6	(Russia) Vasilenko (Russia) Sanaya
2011–12	2nd	20	38	8	2	28	22	81	27	R32	—	(Czech Republic) Papadopulos - 5	(Russia) Cherchesov

== Reserve squad ==
Zhemchuzhina's reserve squad played professionally as FC Zhemchuzhina-d Sochi (Russian Third League in 1995–1997) and FC Zhemchuzhina-2 Sochi (Russian Second Division in 1998–1999). In 1992-1993 the reserves team was based in Adler and played under the name of FC Torpedo Adler.

Another farm club called FC Dynamo-Zhemchuzhina-2 Sochi played professionally in Russian Third League in 1996 and Russian Second League in 1997.

== Notable players ==
Had international caps for their respective countries. Players whose name is listed in bold represented their countries while playing for Zhemchuzhina.

- (Russia) Denis Boyarintsev
- (Russia) Maksim Demenko
- (Russia) (Ukraine) Olexandr Gorshkov
- (Russia) Lyubomir Kantonistov
- (Armenia) Arsen Avetisyan
- (Armenia) Eduard Partsikyan
- (Armenia) Tigran Petrosyan
- (Armenia) **Manuk Kakosyan**
- (Armenia) **Robert Zebelyan**
- (Azerbaijan) **Kazemır Qudiyev**
- (Azerbaijan) **Nazim Suleymanov**
- (Belarus) Vital Bulyga
- (Belarus) **Konstantin Kovalenko**
- (Belarus) **Gennady Tumilovich**
- (Belarus) Uladzimir Zhuravel
- (Bosnia and Herzegovina) Ricardo Baiano
- (Czech Republic) Marek Čech
- (Czech Republic) Michal Papadopulos
- (Georgia (country)) **Gocha Gogrichiani**
- (Georgia (country)) **Zurab Ionanidze**
- (Georgia (country)) Davit Janashia
- (Georgia (country)) David Khmelidze
- (Georgia (country)) Dimitri Kudinov
- (Kazakhstan) Ruslan Baltiev
- (Kazakhstan) **Kazbek Geteriev**
- (Kazakhstan) **Konstantin Ledovskikh**
- (Moldova) Serghei Covalciuc
- (Tajikistan) **Denis Knitel**
- (Tajikistan) **Alexandr Mukanin**
- (Tajikistan) Farkhod Vasiev
- (Ukraine) Andriy Vasylytchuk
- (Uzbekistan) **Vladimir Shishelov**
