= FC Biokhimik-Mordovia Saransk =

- Full name: Football Club Biokhimik-Mordovia Saransk
- Nickname(s): Bio; Tabletki (The Tablets); Biomordy (Bio-Snouts)
- Founded: 1992
- Dissolved: 2004
- League: Russian Second Division, Zone Center
- 2004: 7th
Home colours	Away colours

FC Biokhimik-Mordovia Saransk (Russian: «Биохимик-Мордовия» (Саранск)) was a Russian football team from Saransk. It played professionally in 1992–1993 and 1996–2004. In 2004 it merged into FC Mordovia Saransk. Their best result was 4th place in the Zone 3 of the Russian Second Division in 1993.

== Team name history ==
- 1992: FC MGU Saransk
- 1993–1994: FC Saranskeksport Saransk
- 1995: FC Biokhimik Saransk
- 1996–2004: FC Biokhimik-Mordovia Saransk

== Results ==
- 1995 – 2nd place in the Amateur Football League (the Third Division), zone “Povolzhye”
- 1996 – 7th place in the Third League, zone 5
- 1997 – 7th place in the Third League, zone 5
- 1998 – 8th place in the Second Division, zone “Povolzhye”
- 1999 – 8th place in the Second Division, zone “Povolzhye”
- 2000 – 12th place in the Second Division, zone “Povolzhye”
- 2001 – 10th place in the Second Division, zone “Povolzhye”
- 2002 – 5th place in the Second Division, zone “Povolzhye”
- 2003 – 18th place in the Second Division, zone “Center”
- 2004 – 7th place in the Second Division, zone “Center”
