= FC Mashinostroitel Pskov =

- Full name: Football Club Mashinostroitel Pskov
- Founded: 1970
- Dissolved: 2005
- League: Second Division, Zone West
- 2005: 17th (starred after 1st part)

FC Mashinostroitel Pskov (Russian: «Машиностроитель» (Псков)) was a Russian football team from Pskov. It played professionally from 1970 to 1974 and from 1990 to 1997, 2000–2005. Their best result was 2nd place in Zone West of the Russian Second Division in 2001.

Champions of Amateur Football League — Zone North-West and Final round (1999). Winner North-West Cup (1999).

== Team name history ==
- 1970: FC Elektron Pskov
- 1971–1998: FC Mashinostroitel Pskov
- 1998–2000: FC Pskov
- 2001–2005: FC Pskov-2000
