= FC Sochi-04 =

Association football club based in Sochi, Russia

Sochi-04
- Full name: Football Club Sochi-04
- Founded: 2004
- Dissolved: 2009
- Ground: Central Stadium, Sochi
- Capacity: 12,500
- Chairman: Oleg Shinkaryov
- Manager: Boris Sinitsyn
- League: N/A
- 2008: Russian Second Division, Zone South, 16th
Home colours	Away colours

FC Sochi-04 (Russian: ФК "Сочи-04") is a Russian football club based in Sochi. The club played in the South zone of the Russian Second Division in 2008. In 2009 it was denied license and won't play on the professional level.

FC Sochi-04 was founded in 2004 following the dissolution of FC Zhemchuzhina Sochi. The club entered Krasnodar Krai championship and finished sixth. However, they were given a place in the Second Division after a team from nearby Lazarevskoye, which was promoted to Second Division, was disbanded. Sochi-04 finished 7th out of 13 in 2005.
