= FC Slavyansk Slavyansk-na-Kubani =

- Full name: Football Club Slavyansk Slavyansk-na-Kubani
- Founded: 1990
- Dissolved: 2005
- League: Russian Second Division, Zone South
- 2004: 17th

FC Slavyansk Slavyansk-na-Kubani (Russian: «Славянск» (Славянск‑на‑Кубани)) was a Russian football team from Slavyansk-na-Kubani. It played professionally from 1990 to 2004. The best result they achieved was 6th place in the Zone 1 of the Russian Second Division in 1992.

== Team name history ==
- 1990–1993 FC Kuban Barannikovsky (based in Barannikovsky, Krasnodar Krai)
- 1994–1998 FC Kuban Slavyansk-na-Kubani
- 1999–2004 FC Slavyansk Slavyansk-na-Kubani
