= List of people from Yaroslavl =

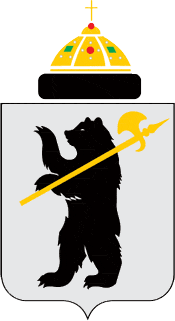
Coat of Arms of Yaroslavl

This is a list of notable people who were born or have lived in Yaroslavl, Russia.

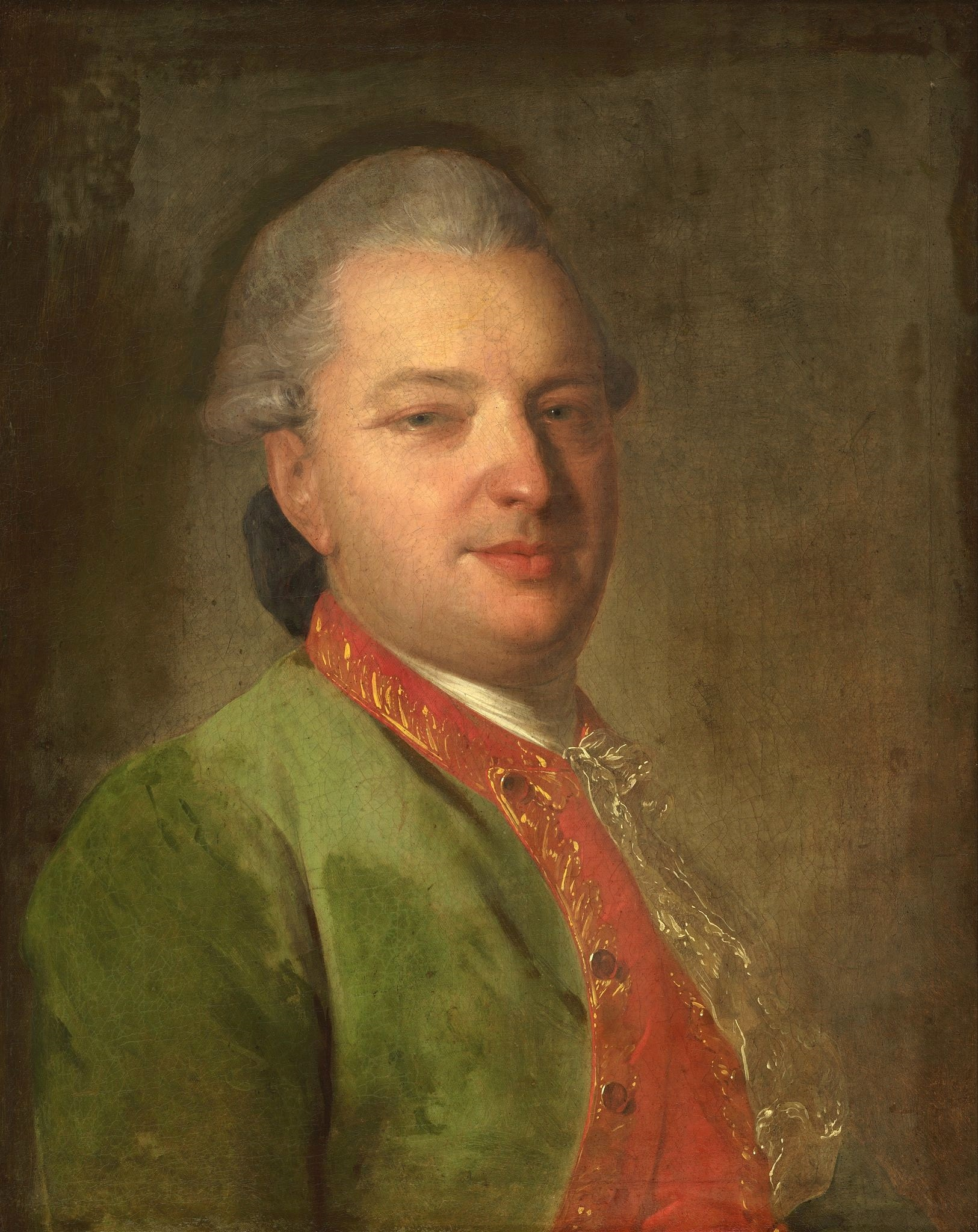
Vasily Maykov (1728–1778)

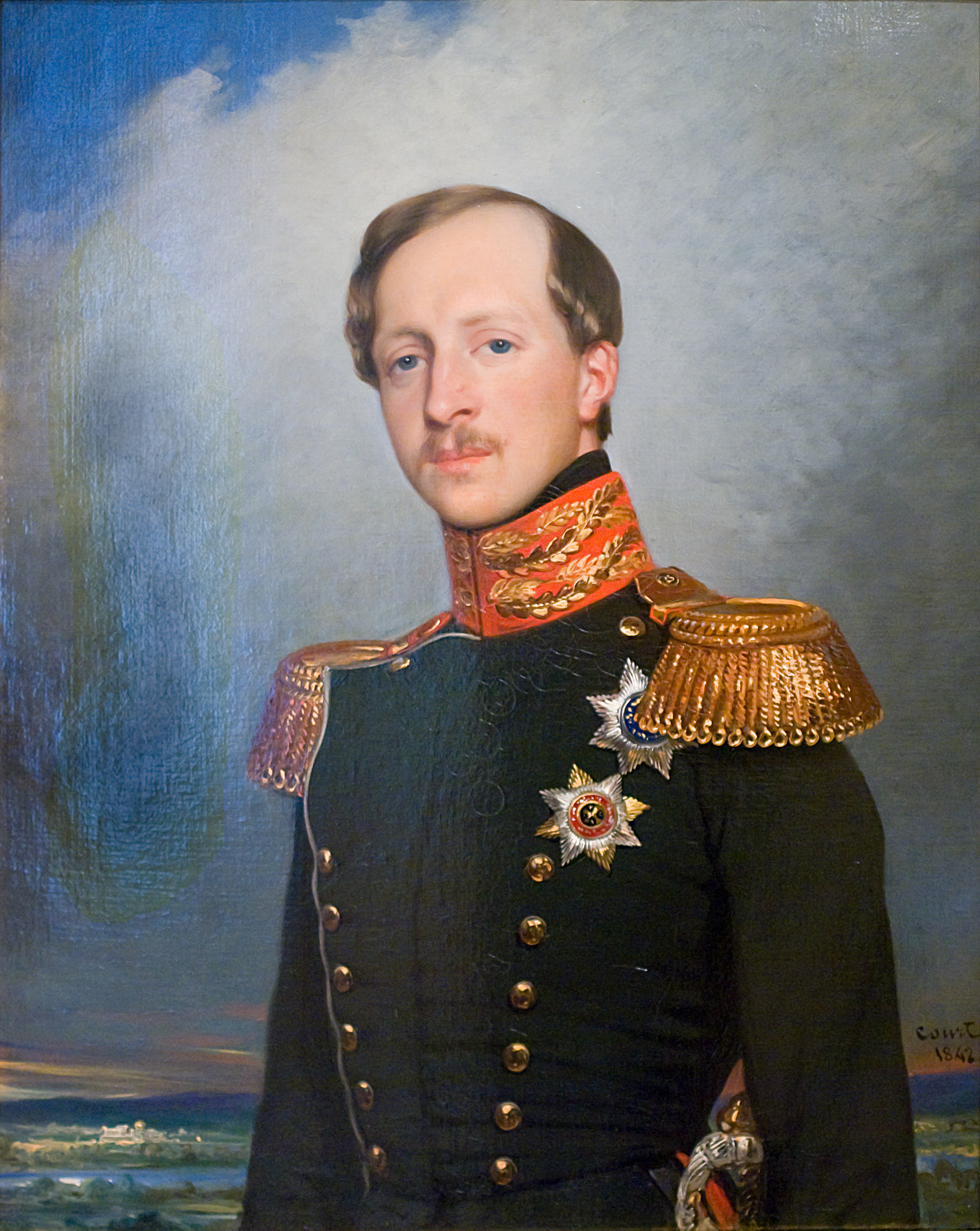
Duke of Oldenburg (1812–1881)

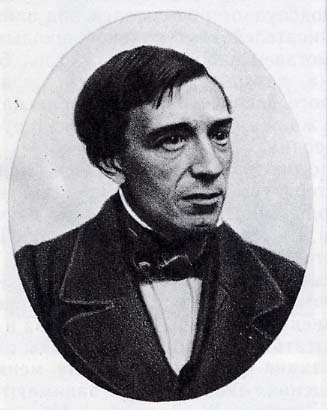
Izmail Sreznevsky (1812–1880)

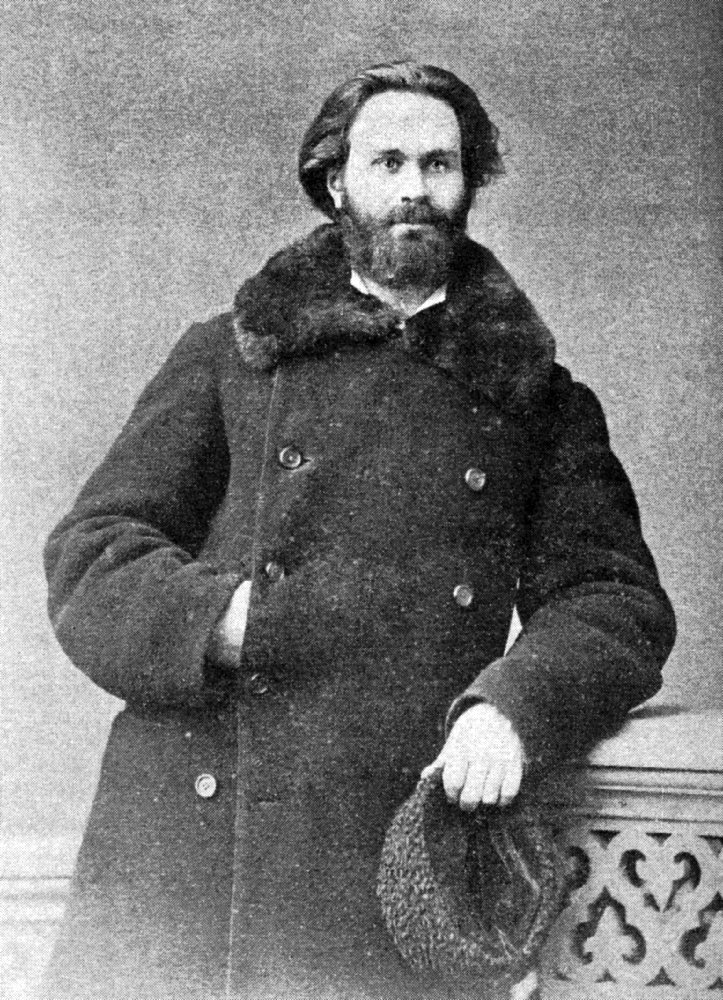
Leonid Sabaneyev (1844–1898)

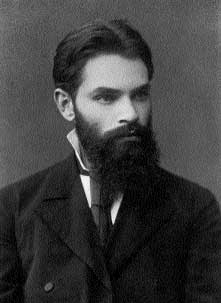
Aleksandr Lyapunov (1857–1918)

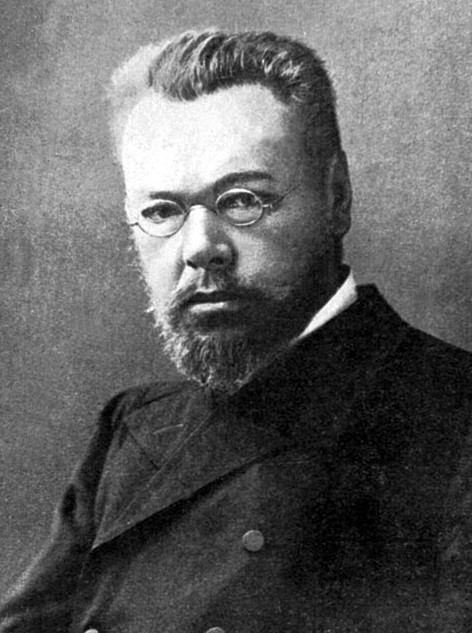
Konstantin Satunin (1863–1915)

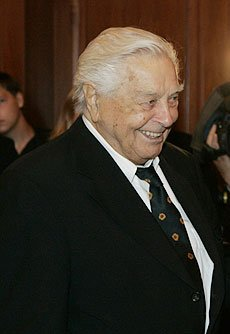
Yuri Lyubimov (1917–2014)

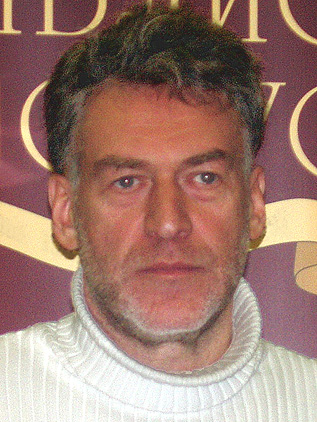
Artemy Troitsky (born 1955)

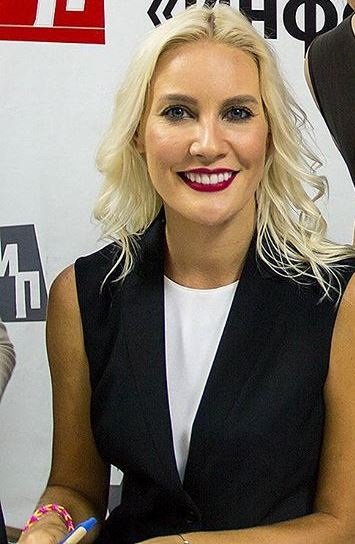
Elena Letuchaya (born 1978)

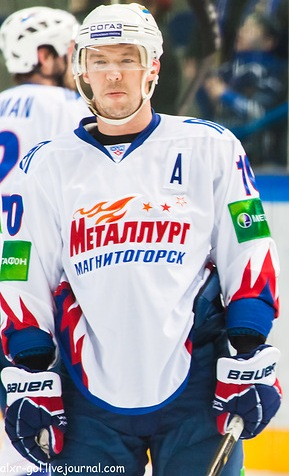
Sergei Mozyakin (born 1981)

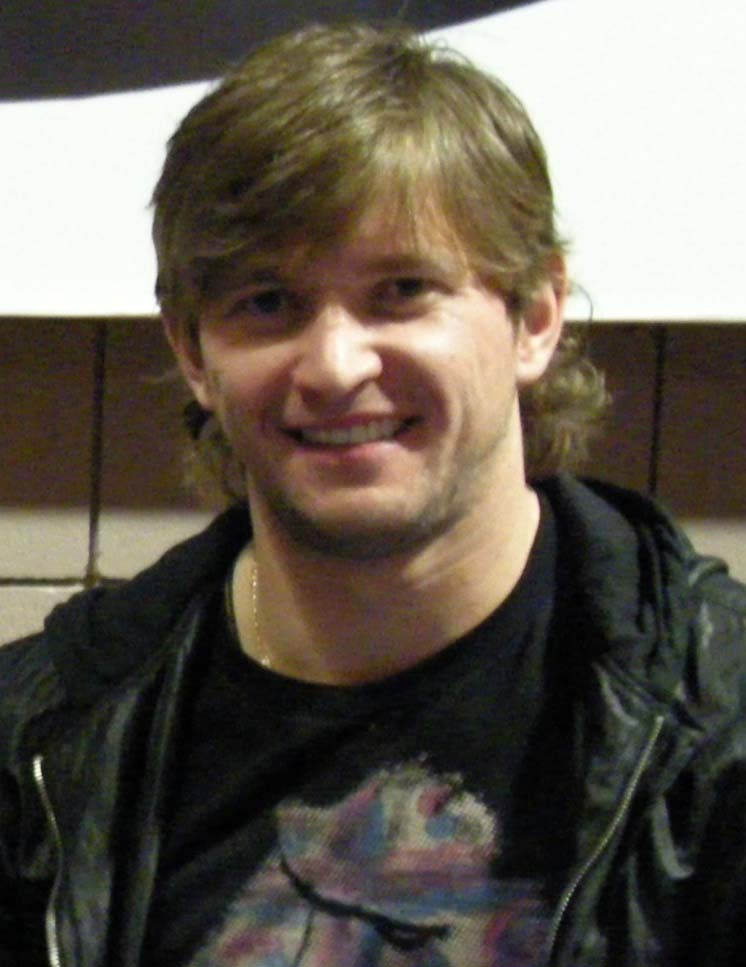
Denis Grebeshkov (born 1983)

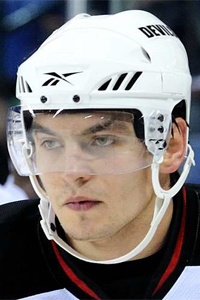
Alexander Vasyunov (1988–2011)

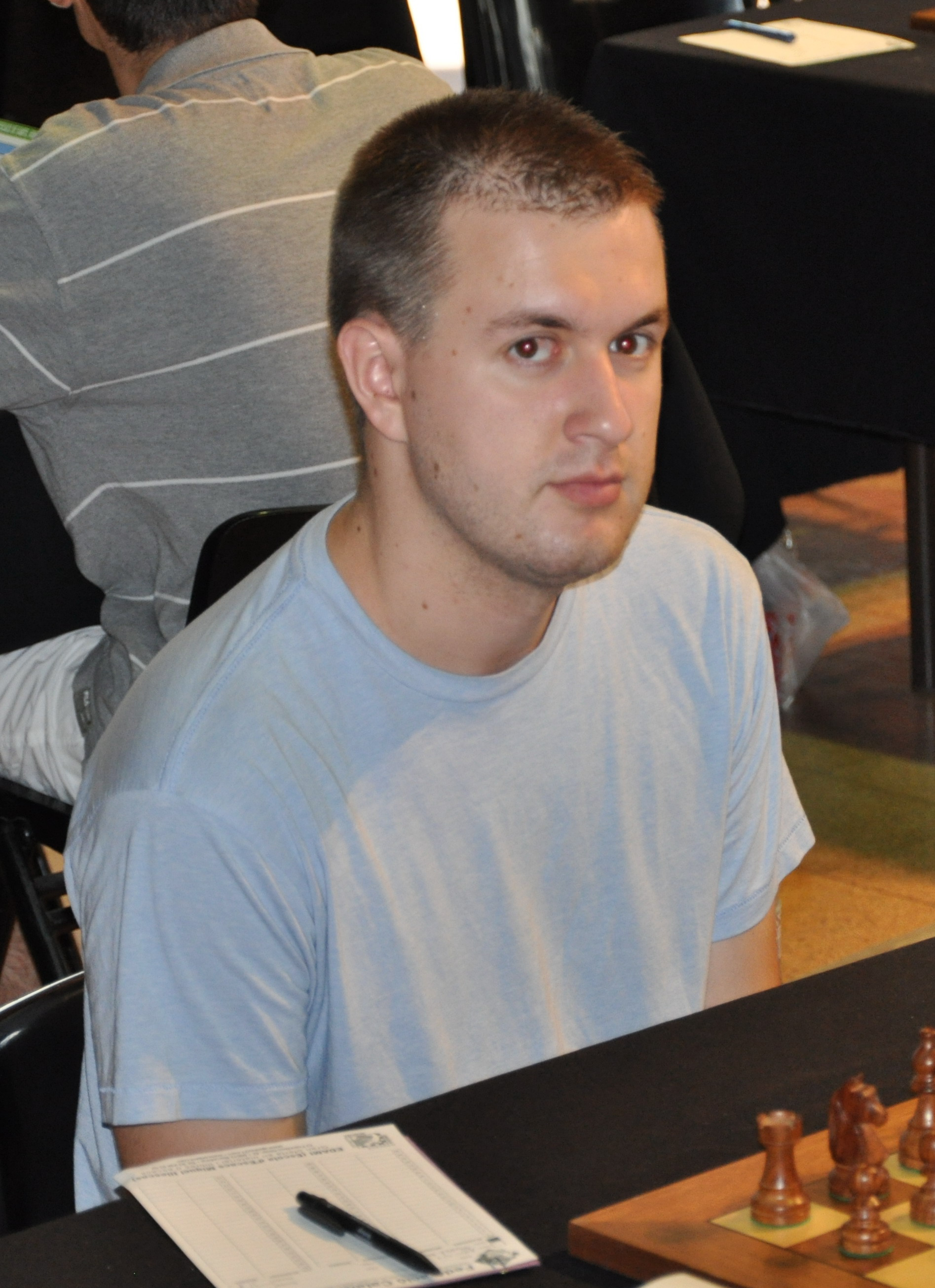
Mark Bluvshtein (born 1988)

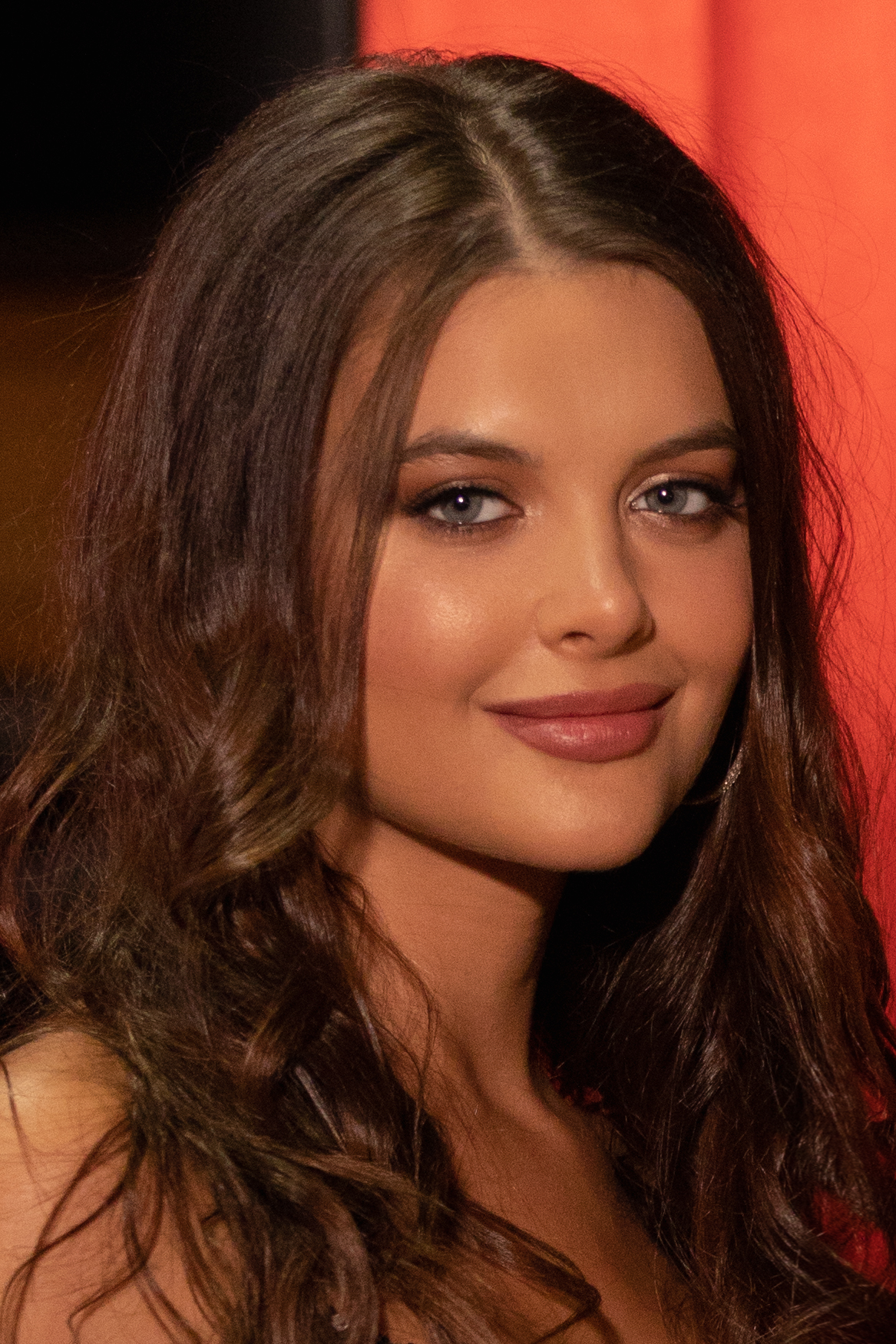
Olga Meganskaya (born 1992)

== Born in Yaroslavl ==
=== 17th century ===
==== 1601–1700 ====
- Joseph Vladimirov (active 1642–1666), Russian painter and art theorist of the 17th century

=== 18th century ===
==== 1701–1800 ====
- Vasily Maykov (1728–1778), Russian poet, fabulist, playwright and translator
- Ivan Dmitrevsky (1734–1821), the most influential actor of Russian Neoclassicism and "Russia's first great tragedian"
- Mikhail Popov (1742–1790), Russian writer, poet, dramatist and opera librettist
- Gerasim Lebedev (1749–1817), Russian adventurer, linguist, pioneer of Bengali theatre, translator, musician and writer
- Semyon Bobrov (1763/1765–1810), Russian poet and civil servant
- Andrei Ukhtomsky (1771–1852), Russian copper engraver
- Nikolay Mylnikov (1797–1842), Russian portrait painter

=== 19th century ===
==== 1801–1900 ====
- Karolina Pavlova (1807–1893), Russian poet and novelist
- Duke Peter Georgievich of Oldenburg (1812–1881), Duke of the House of Oldenburg
- Izmail Sreznevsky (1812–1880), a towering figure in 19th-century Slavic studies
- Leonid Sabaneyev (1844–1898), Russian zoologist
- Aleksandr Lyapunov (1857–1918), Russian mathematician, mechanician and physicist
- Liverij Darkshevich (1858–1925), Russian neurologist
- Sergei Lyapunov (1859–1924), Russian composer and pianist
- Konstantin Satunin (1863–1915), Russian zoologist
- Mikhail Kuzmin (1872–1936), Russian poet, musician and novelist
- Leonid Sobinov (1872–1934), Russian opera singer
- Mikhail Sokolov (1885–1947), Russian painter, graphic artist and illustrator active in Soviet Avant-garde arts activity
- Ivan Vakhrameev (1885–1965), Russian revolutionary
- Nikolai Nevsky (1892–1937), Russian and Soviet linguist
- Mikhail Viktorov (1892–1938), Russian military leader and Commander-in-Chief of the Soviet Naval Forces

=== 20th century ===
==== 1901–1920 ====
- Boris Shavyrin (1902–1965), Russian artillery and rocket engineer
- Bonifaty Kedrov (1903–1985), Soviet researcher, philosopher, logician, chemist and psychologist
- Maria Prilezhayeva (1903–1989), Russian and Soviet children's author, literary critic and the Soviet Union of Writers official
- Tikhon Rabotnov (1904–2000), Russian plant ecologist
- Maria Petrovykh (1908–1979), Russian poet and translator
- Victor Rozov (1913–2004), Russian Soviet dramatist
- Yuri Lyubimov (1917–2014), Soviet and Russian stage actor and director associated with the internationally renowned Taganka Theatre, which he founded in 1964
- Yury Smyslov (1920–1991), Soviet equestrian

==== 1921–1950 ====
- Aleksey Naumov (1923–1943), WWII Soviet tank commander
- Veniamin Basner (1925–1996), Russian composer
- Violetta Kiss (1925–1994), Soviet acrobat, juggler, director, and teacher
- Sergei Kalinin (1926–1997), Russian sports shooter
- Viktor Danilov (1927–2016), abbot of the Greek Catholic parish in Grodno
- Pavel Kolchin (1930–2010), Soviet cross-country skier
- Juvenal Poyarkov (born 1935), hierarch of the Russian Orthodox Church
- Oleg Aleksandrov (1937–1997), Soviet rower
- Viktor Tsaryov (1939–2020), Soviet sprint canoeist
- Viktor Sheinov (born 1940), Professor of Psychology and Pedagogical Proficiency
- Valery Tarakanov (born 1941), Soviet/Russian cross-country skier
- Valentin Kornev (1942–2016), Soviet sport shooter
- Valery Volkov (born 1947), Soviet equestrian and Olympic champion
- Valeri Frolov (born 1949), Russian professional football coach and a former player

==== 1951–1960 ====
- Alexander (Ishchein) (1952–2021), prelate, who served as the archbishop of Russian Orthodox Diocese of Baku and Azerbaijan from 1999 until his death in 2021
- Vladimir Churkin (1953–2021), Soviet and Russian football player and coach
- Volodymyr Makukha (born 1955), Ukrainian politician and diplomat
- Artemy Troitsky (born 1955), Russian journalist, music critic, concert promoter, broadcaster and an academic
- Aleksandr Pobegalov (born 1956), Russian professional football coach
- Aleksandr Petrov (born 1957), Oscar-winning Russian animator and animation director
- Nataliya Popova (born 1958), Russian former swimmer
- Yevgeni Martyanov (born 1959), Russian professional football coach and a former player

==== 1961–1970 ====
- Andrei Khomutov (born 1961), Soviet ice hockey right winger
- Yevgeni Kuznetsov (born 1961), Russian professional football coach and a former player
- Sergey Shlyapnikov (born 1961), Russian volleyball coach
- Sergey Okrugin (born 1963), Russian chess International Master
- Rinad Minvaleyev (born 1965), Russian physiologist, orientalist and researcher of the traditional health cаre systems
- Yevheniya Tovstohan (born 1965), Soviet Ukrainian handball player
- Aleksei Kazalov (born 1967), Russian professional football coach and a former player
- Oleg Kiselyov (born 1967), Russian handball player
- Dmitri Popov (born 1967), Russian retired footballer
- Alex Sipiagin (born 1967), Russian jazz trumpet and flugelhorn player
- Yevgeny Urlashov (born 1967), Mayor of Yaroslavl between April 2012 and July 2013
- Tatyana Babashkina (born 1968), Russian high jumper
- Alexei Chistyakov (born 1968), Russian ice hockey coach and former professional player
- Svitlana Kashchenko (born 1968), Russian-born Nicaraguan sport shooter
- Vadim Pomazov (born 1968), Russian football player
- Andrei Kruchin (born 1970), Russian football player
- Vyacheslav Solovyov (1970–2008), Russian serial killer and poisoner
- Maksim Tarasov (born 1970), Russian Olympic pole vaulter

==== 1971–1980 ====
- Anna Malova (born 1971), Russian beauty queen, model and physician who was crowned Miss Russia 1998
- Igor Varlamov (1971–2022), Russian footballer
- Andrei Zhirov (born 1971), Russian professional football coach and a former player
- Vladimir Zhukov (born 1972), Russian serial killer, rapist and pedophile
- Sergei Bulavin (born 1973), Russian football player
- Andrei Galyanov (born 1973), Russian professional footballer
- Theodore (Kazanov) (born 1973), Metropolitan of the Russian Orthodox Church
- Aleksey Kostygov (born 1973), Russian handball player
- Andrey Zadorozhniy (born 1973), Russian middle distance runner
- Galimdzhan Khayrulin (born 1974), Russian football manager and a former player
- Aleksei Klestov (born 1974), Russian football player
- Evgeni Ryabchikov (born 1974), Russian professional ice hockey goaltender
- Ildar Yubin (born 1974), Russian professional ice hockey player
- Aleksandr Kalinin (born 1975), Russian football coach and a former player
- Vyacheslav Lotoryov (born 1975), Russian football player
- Artyom Yenin (1976–2024), Russian association football player
- Vasili Chernitsyn (born 1977), Russian professional footballer
- Ilya Gorokhov (born 1977), Russian professional ice hockey defenceman
- Alexei Vasiliev (born 1977), Russian professional ice hockey defenseman
- Pavel Korostelyov (born 1978), Russian cross-country skier
- Elena Letuchaya (born 1978), Russian journalist, television presenter, producer and director
- Vyacheslav Pozdnyakov (born 1978), Russian fencer
- Aleksey Zagornyi (born 1978), Russian hammer thrower
- Tatyana Andrianova (born 1979), Russian middle distance runner
- Mikhail Donika (born 1979), Russian ice hockey defenceman
- Elena Grosheva (born 1979), Russian Olympic gymnast
- Ivan Tkachenko (1979–2011), Russian professional ice hockey winger
- Aleksandr Chistyakov (born 1980), Russian professional football player
- Sergei Kuznetsov (born 1980), Russian ice hockey left winger
- Aleksandr Malyshev (born 1980), Russian professional footballer

==== 1981–1990 ====
- Alexander Barkunov (born 1981), Russian professional ice hockey player
- Sergei Mozyakin (born 1981), Russian professional ice hockey winger
- Simon Rastorguev (born 1981), Russian architect
- Igor Yemeleyev (born 1981), Russian professional ice hockey player
- Ivan Nepryaev (born 1982), Russian ice hockey forward
- Ilya Tkachyov (born 1982), former Russian professional footballer
- Evgeny Drattsev (born 1983), Russian swimmer
- Denis Grebeshkov (born 1983), Russian professional ice hockey defenceman
- Lyudmila Postnova (born 1984), Russian team handball player
- Dmitri Utkin (born 1984), Russian professional ice hockey player
- Mikhail Biryukov (born 1985), Russian ice hockey goaltender
- Alexander Galimov (1985–2011), Russian professional ice hockey player
- Dmitri Golubev (born 1985), Russian professional footballer
- Yaroslav Kharitonskiy (born 1985), Russian professional footballer
- Viktor Myagkov (born 1985), Russian professional footballer
- Oleg Piganovich (born 1985), Russian professional ice hockey Defenseman
- Igor Shtukin (born 1985), Russian professional footballer
- Georgi Ulyanov (born 1985), Russian footballer
- Andrei Kiryukhin (1987–2011), Russian professional ice hockey winger
- Elena Kostyuchenko (born 1987), Russian journalist and gay rights activist
- Artem Anisimov (born 1988), Russian professional ice hockey center
- Mark Bluvshtein (born 1988), Soviet-born Canadian chess player
- Levan Latsuzbaya (born 1988), Russian professional football player
- Aleksandr Lazushin (born 1988), Russian professional ice hockey player
- Maxim Malyutin (born 1988), Belarusian professional ice hockey goaltender
- Alexander Vasyunov (1988–2011), Russian ice hockey player
- Ilya Davydov (born 1989), Russian professional ice hockey defenceman
- Kirill Gavrilychev (born 1989), Russian ice hockey defenceman
- Lyubov Polyanskaya (born 1989), Russian professional triathlete
- Artyom Smirnov (born 1989), Russian professional football player
- Artyom Garifullin (born 1990), Russian ice hockey player
- Mariya Koroleva (born 1990), American synchronized swimmer
- Alexander Shibaev (born 1990), Russian table tennis player
- Artem Yarchuk (1990–2011), Russian professional ice hockey winger

==== 1991–2000 ====
- Ilya Burov (born 1991), Russian freestyle skier
- Vladimir Tarasenko (born 1991), Russian professional ice hockey right winger
- Yuri Urychev (1991–2011), Russian professional ice hockey player
- Maksim Bobylev (born 1992), Russian professional football player
- Pavel Krotov (born 1992), Russian freestyle skier
- Olga Meganskaya (born 1992), Russian singer and model
- Artyom Shchadin (born 1992), Russian professional football player
- Pavel Snurnitsyn (1992–2011), Russian professional ice hockey player
- Yevgeni Steshin (born 1992), Russian professional football player
- Artyom Artemyev (born 1993), Russian ice hockey goaltender
- Kirill Kapustin (born 1993), Russian ice hockey player
- Maxim Osipov (born 1993), Russian ice hockey defenceman
- Mikhail Zemskov (born 1994), Russian professional football player
- Dmitri Belov (born 1995), Russian football player
- Vladislav Gavrikov (born 1995), Russian ice hockey defenceman
- Nadezhda Karpova (born 1995), Russian footballer
- Anastasia Lagina (born 1995), Russian handball player
- Stanislav Nikitin (born 1995), Russian freestyle skier
- Ilya Serikov (born 1995), Russian football player
- Igor Zolotovskiy (born 1995), Russian football player
- Pavel Kraskovsky (born 1996), Russian ice hockey player
- Alexander Yelesin (born 1996), Russian professional ice hockey defenceman
- Arsen Ayrapetyan (born 1997), Russian football player
- Anton Betyuzhnov (born 1997), Russian football player
- Anastasiia Galashina (born 1997), Russian sport shooter
- Pavel Kudryavtsev (born 1997), Russian professional ice hockey player
- Ivan Provorov (born 1997), Russian junior ice hockey defenseman
- Mikhail Sidorov (born 1997), Russian professional ice hockey defenceman
- Nikolai Vovk (born 1997), Russian football player
- Maxim Burov (born 1998), Russian male freestyle skier
- Ilya Konovalov (born 1998), Russian ice hockey goaltender
- Aleksei Gerasimov (born 1999), Russian football player
- Liubov Nikitina (born 1999), Russian freestyle skier
- Ekaterina Zelenkova (born 1999), Russian female handballer
- Maxim Denezhkin (born 2000), Russian professional ice hockey forward

=== 21st century ===
==== 2001–2100 ====
- Igor Maslennikov (born 2001), Russian football player
- Karina Metelkova (born 2003), Russian group rhythmic gymnast
- Vitali Shitov (born 2003), Russian football player
- Vladislav Shitov (born 2003), Russian football player

== Lived in Yaroslavl ==
- Vasili, Prince of Yaroslavl (died 1345), prince of the Principality of Yaroslavl from 1321 to 1345
- Fyodor Volkov (1729–1763), founder of the first Russian theater
- Nikolay Nekrasov (1821–1878), Russian poet
- Konstantin Ushinsky (1824–1871), Russian teacher and writer, founder of Russian pedagogics
- Aleksandr Lyapunov (1857–1918), Russian mathematician, mechanician and physicist
- Klavdiya Gadyuchkina (1910–2025), Russian supercentenarian, oldest Russian person ever
- Valentina Tereshkova (born 1937), Russian cosmonaut and politician; the first woman in space

== See also ==
- List of Russian people
- List of Russian-language poets
