= Kalinin (surname) =

Kalinin (Russian: Кали́нин [kɐˈlʲinʲɪn]), or Kalinina (feminine; Кали́нина [kɐˈlʲinʲɪnə]), is a Russian surname, derived from the word kalina (калина, meaning "guelder rose"). Notable people with the surname include:

- Aleksandr Kalinin (disambiguation) – several persons
- Anatoĺ Kalinin (born 1959), Belarusian politician and diplomat
- Anhelina Kalinina (born 1997), Ukrainian tennis player
- Dmitri Kalinin (born 1980), Russian hockey player
- Ekaterina Kalinina (1882–1960), First Lady of the Soviet Union (1922–1946)
- Elena Kalinina (born 1997), Russian kitesurfer
- Fedor Kalinin (1882–1920), Russian Bolshevik revolutionary and politician
- Ganna Kalinina (born 1979), Ukrainian Olympic sailor
- Irina Kalinina (born 1959), Soviet diver
- Igor Kalinin (born 1959), Ukrainian politician
- Ihor Kalinin (born 1995), Ukrainian footballer
- Konstantin Kalinin (1889–1940), Soviet aircraft designer
- Ludmila Kalinina (born 1957), skating coach
- Mikhail Kalinin (1875–1946), Russian Bolshevik revolutionary and politician, head of state of Soviet Russia and later of the Soviet Union
- Natalia Kalinina (born 1973), Soviet gymnast
- Sergei Kalinin (disambiguation) – several persons
- Yana Kalinina (born 1994), Ukrainian footballer
- Vladislava Kalinina (born 1980), Ukrainian chess player
