= Dmitri Topolev =

Russian footballer

Personal information
- Full name: Dmitri Andreyevich Topolev
- Date of birth: 3 July 1976 (age 50)
- Height: 1.74 m (5 ft 8 1/2 in)
- Position: Defender

Senior career*
Years	Team	Apps	(Gls)
1998–1999	FC Spartak-Orekhovo Orekhovo-Zuyevo	60	(0)
2000	FC Spartak Lukhovitsy	17	(0)
2000	FC Shinnik Yaroslavl	1	(0)
2001	FC Neftyanik Yaroslavl	27	(0)
2002	FC Arsenal Tula	16	(0)
2002	FC Vityaz Podolsk	11	(0)
2003	FC Severstal Cherepovets	18	(0)
2004	FC Spartak Lukhovitsy	30	(0)
2005	FC Vityaz Podolsk	10	(0)
2007–2010	FC Znamya Truda Orekhovo-Zuyevo	112	(0)
2012–2013	FC Znamya Truda Orekhovo-Zuyevo	38	(0)
- * Club domestic league appearances and goals

Dmitri Andreyevich Topolev (Russian: Дмитрий Андреевич Тополев; born 3 July 1976) is a former Russian professional football player.

== Club career ==
He played 2 seasons in the Russian Football National League for FC Spartak-Orekhovo Orekhovo-Zuyevo and FC Shinnik Yaroslavl.
