= Klestov =

Klestov (feminine: Klestova) is a Russian patronymic surname, ultimately derived from the bird name Клёст, 'crossbill'. Notable people with the surname include:

- Aleksei Klestov (born 1974), Russian footballer
- Nikolai Klestov (1873–1941), Russian Bolshevik revolutionary, political writer and publicist
