= Sabaneyev =

Sabaneyev (feminine Sabanayeva) is a surname of Russian origin. Notable people with this surname include:

- Leonid Sabaneyev (1881–1968), Russian musicologist, music critic, composer and scientist
- Leonid Pavlovich Sabaneyev (1844–1898), Russian zoologist
