= Dmitri Belov =

Dmitri Belov may refer to:

- Dmitri Belov (footballer, born 1980), Russian football player
- Dmitri Belov (footballer, born 1995), Russian football player
