= Valeri Bakin =

Russian footballer

Personal information
- Full name: Valeri Vladimirovich Bakin
- Date of birth: 16 June 1967 (age 59)
- Height: 1.75 m (5 ft 9 in)
- Positions: Defender; midfielder

Youth career
- Yaroslavets Yaroslavl

Senior career*
| Years | Team | Apps | (Gls) |
| 1984 | FC Shinnik Yaroslavl | 0 | (0) |
| 1985–1989 | FC Saturn Rybinsk | 152 | (4) |
| 1990 | FC Spartak Kostroma | 28 | (0) |
| 1991–1994 | FC Shinnik Yaroslavl | 133 | (4) |
| 1995–2001 | FC Neftyanik Yaroslavl | 221 | (8) |
- * Club domestic league appearances and goals

Valeri Vladimirovich Bakin (Russian: Валерий Владимирович Бакин; born 16 June 1967) is a former Russian football player.
