= Hunting in Russia =

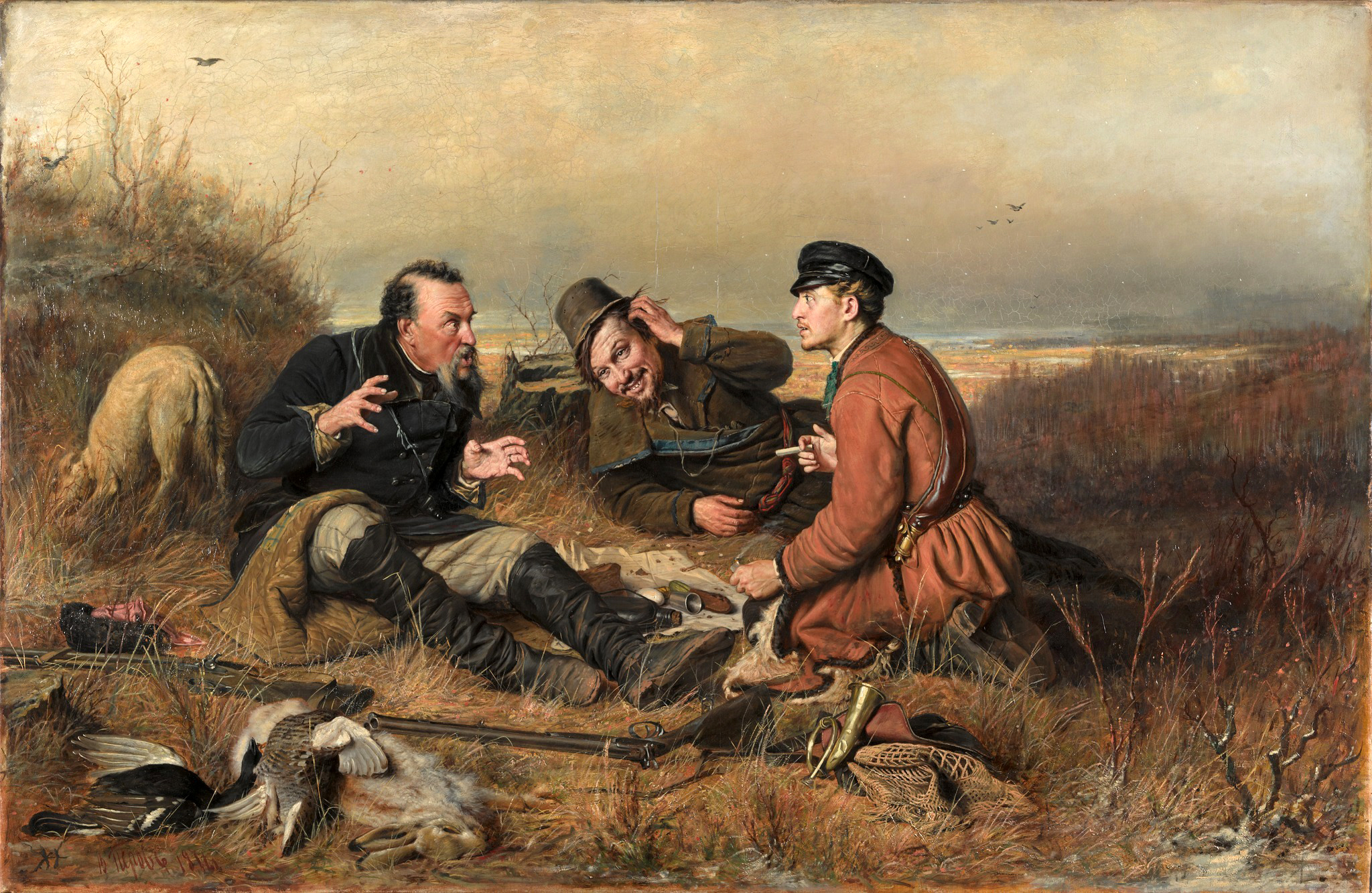
The Hunters at Rest by Vasily Perov. 1871.

Hunting in Russia has an old tradition in terms of indigenous people, while the original features of state and princely economy were farming and cattle-breeding. There was hunting for food as well as sport. The word "hunting" ("охота", okhota) first appeared in the common Russian language at the end of the 15th century. Before that the word "catchings" ("ловы", lovy) existed to designate the hunting business in general. The hunting grounds were called in turn lovishcha ("ловища"). In the 15th-16th centuries, foreign ambassadors were frequently invited to hunts; they also received some of the prey afterwards.

The right of using the hunting grounds in Russia was once granted to every social class. The right of the nobility was even sometimes limited by agreements with others regarding hunting grounds. The hawkers and separate persons who dealt with hounds, beavers, black grouse, hares, etc. were permitted either on the landed properties, or on territories specified by local people. Though the Russian Orthodox clergy once disapproved the hunting, these persons were authorized to eat and feed their horses, hounds and falcons on others' account or even demand participation in hunting.

The Russian imperial hunts evolved from hunting traditions of early Russian rulers (Grand Princes and Tsars), under the influence of hunting customs of European royal courts.

During the soviet rule, state-sponsored hunting clubs were formed within the administrative boundaries or factories. Hunting clubs based in cities were allocated hunting grounds where club members were allowed to hunt according to the federal and local regulations. Following demise of the Soviet Union private individuals were allowed to lease hunting territories formerly used by government sponsored clubs. Many lease owners are wealthy Russians who are willing to spend large sums of money in order to maintain leased hunting grounds for their pleasure and sometimes to allow other hunters to use their territories for a fee. As a result, the quality and quantity of the game increased dramatically during the past 20 years in most parts of Russia. During the Soviet Union time, a single agency called "Glavohota" was granted an authority to conduct hunts for the foreign hunters. Nowadays many outfitters and booking agents organize hunting trips for the foreigners. The inevitable competition between such companies improved quality of hunts and brought down the prices which used to be extremely high.

== Big game ==
=== Bear ===
Russia's northeast part, the Kamchatka Peninsula and the coastal regions of the Pacific Ocean, have the highest density of brown bears. There are Eurasian brown bear (Ursus arctos arctos), Siberian brown bear (Ursus arctos beringianus), Syrian brown bear (Ursus arctos syriacus), Ussuri brown bear (Ursus arctos lasiotus), etc.

Grand Prince of Moscow Ivan IV Vasilyevich was present at the bear hunts at the age of 13. False Dmitriy I was especially keen on bear hunting. A legend describes the miraculous salvation of Tsar Alexis of Russia from a bear by Saint Sava. After 1650/51 the bear hunts of Tsars became rare. In 2007 Russia proposed to allow polar bear hunting by the Chukchi people, for the first time since the Soviet Union banned hunting the dwindling species in 1956.

=== Wolf ===
The wolf is the most widespread large indigenous game animal in Russia. The best hunting time is considered to be January–February.

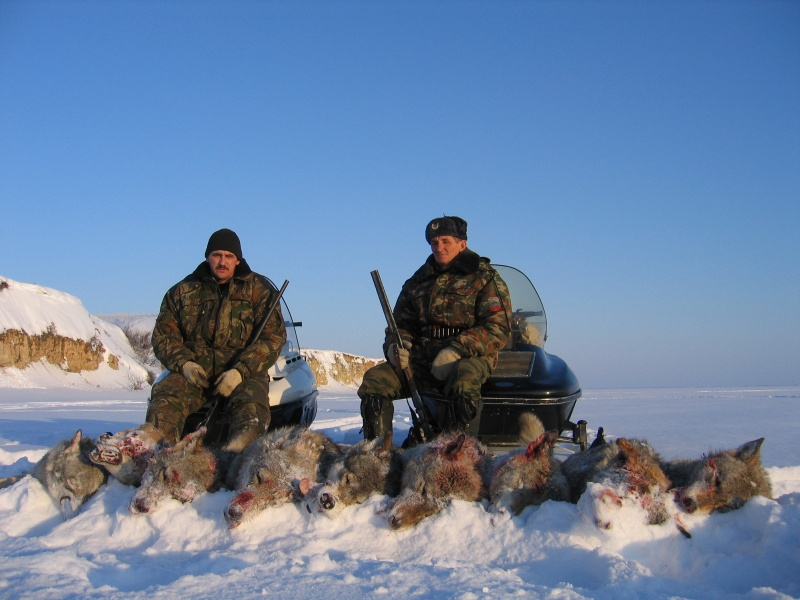
Carcasses of hunted wolves in Kamyshinsky District, Volgograd Oblast, Russia.

Wolves were hunted in both Czarist and Soviet Russia with borzoi by landowners and Cossacks. Covers were drawn by sending mounted men through a wood with a number of dogs of various breeds, including deerhounds, staghounds and Siberian wolfhounds, as well as smaller greyhounds and foxhounds, as they made more noise than borzoi. A beater, holding up to six dogs by leash, would enter a wooded area where wolves would have been previously sighted. Other hunters on horseback would select a place in the open where the wolf or wolves may break. Each hunter held one or two borzois, which would be slipped the moment the wolf takes flight. Once the beater sighted a wolf, he would shout "Loup! Loup! Loup!" and slip the dogs. Thea idea was to trap the wolf between the pursuing dogs and the hunters on horseback outside the wood. The borzois would pursue the wolf along with the horsemen and yapping curs. Once the wolf was caught by the borzois, the foremost rider would dismount and quickly dispatch the wolf with a knife. Occasionally, wolves are captured alive in order to better train borzoi pups.

Before the Emancipation reform of 1861, wolf hunting was done solely by authorised firearm holders, usually police, soldiers, rich landowners or nobles. Upon learning of the frequency of attacks on livestock and humans, the Czarist Ministry of the Interior sent agents to Western Europe in order to learn how the people there dealt with wolf problems. Upon returning, the Ministry of Internal Affairs developed a plan in 1846 to deal with wolves involving the opening of wolf bounties and appointment of government hunters. Each hunter was given jurisdiction to hunt in one district, with more than one for large areas. Hunters were given 3 rubles for each male wolf killed and 1.5 for each cub, with a tail presented as proof. Each hunter would receive an annual salary of 60 rubles a year, provided he kill 15 adults and 30 cubs a year. Peasant hunters however were rarely rewarded, due to corrupt bureaucrats stealing the money. In 1858, after paying $1 250 000 for over a million wolves in Central Russia, officials became suspicious, and discovered that some hunters bought wolf pelts for low prices, cut them up and handed them to magistrates as wolf tails. In the latter years of the 19th century, Russian hunting societies began an energetic campaign against wolves. In 1897, members of the Moscow Hunting Society killed their first 1000 wolves, though the number of professional wolf hunters at the time was rather low. Serfs began hunting wolves after their emancipation in 1861, though rarely with success, as civilian firearms were highly expensive, and the cheaper ones were usually primitive and unable to bare the heavy ammunition necessary to kill wolves. After the Russian Revolution (1917), the newly formed Soviet government worked heavily to eradicate wolves and other predators during an extensive land reclamation program. During World War 2, wolf populations increased, though after Nazi Germany's defeat, wolf hunts resumed. With the end of the war and the onset of aerial hunting, the USSR destroyed 42,300 wolves in 1945, 62,700 wolves in 1946, 58,700 wolves in 1947, 57,600 in 1948, and 55,300 in 1949. From 1950 to 1954, an average of 50,000 wolves were killed annually. In 1966, wolves had been successfully exterminated in 30 oblasts of the RSFSR. During this time, wolf depredations on humans and livestock had dropped by a factor of ten. However, with the publishing of a Russian translation of Farley Mowat's fictional book Never Cry Wolf, wolf hunts decreased in popularity. Amid public outcry, Czarist and Soviet records of wolf attacks on both livestock and people were ignored and wolf hunts decreased in number, allowing wolves to multiply. 15,900 wolves were reportedly culled from the RSFSR in 1978, compared to 7,900 two years prior. With an increase in population, twice as many wolves were culled in the 1980s than in the prior decade. Wolves became extinct in Wrangel Island in the early 1980s. In 1984, the RSFSR had over 2000 wolf hunting brigades consisting of 15,000 hunters who killed 16 400 wolves. Overall, the Soviet Union culled over 1 500 000 wolves for a cost of 150,000,000 rubles on bounties alone. With the dissolution of the Soviet Union, many wolf bounties were lowered or dropped altogether. Wolf hunting continues in Russia, at the expense of individual hunters rather than the government.

== Hunting with hounds ==
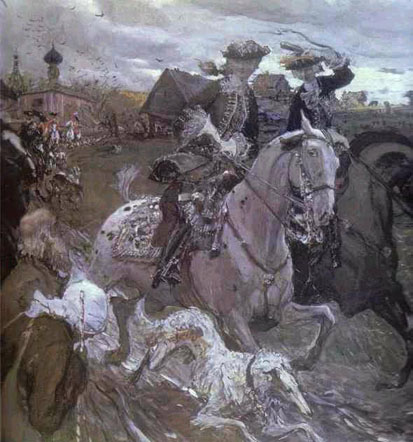
Peter II and his aunt Elizaveta Petrovna go hunting, a 1900 painting by Valentin Serov.

Under Grand Duke Vasili III, who personally loved the huntings for hare, there were over one hundred chasseurs who dealt particularly with wolves and foxes. The court hunt of that time embraced the chasseurs with hounds (выжлятники), their head (доезжачий), borzoi hunters (борзятники), dog-breeders and beaters. Additionally there were cooks, grooms and drivers. Depending on the number of hounds there were big and small hunts. The first one involved forty hounds and twelve packs of three borzois each, and the second consisted of eighteen hounds and twenty borzois in five packs.

As landlords, counts and dukes had kennels, there were stables and villages with serfs, who sowed oats which was to be mixed with meat as a hound forage. Each kennel could support up to 1,000 hounds. The Emancipation reform of 1861 put an end to hunting with hounds. In 1917 there were only two hound chases in the fading Russian Empire: Gatchina and Pershino, in the Tula Governorate.

== Hunting birds ==
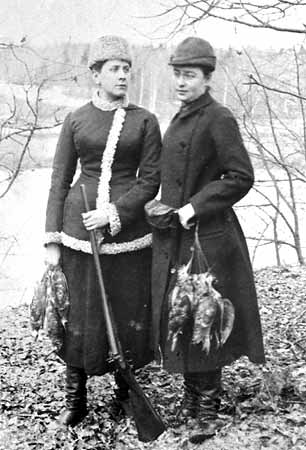
Noblewomen hunting. Taken in the 1890s.

Orthodox martyr Saint Trifon is often depicted with a white merlin on his hand. Particularly the name of Moscow's Sokolniki Park refers to the rapid spread of falconry-related slobodas in Tsarist Russia. As indicated by English diplomat Jerome Horsey, Boris Godunov used to be a hawker. Meanwhile, the use of hunting birds was already popular among Russian nobility in the times of the Golden Horde. There were several hundred such birds in possession of Ivan IV, and even the road tax was collected in pigeons for falcons.

== Walrus ==
The first mention of Russia-related walrus hunting, in the Arctic part of the Northern Atlantic, is dated back to the late 9th century. At that time the Viking Ohthere of Hålogaland, sailing along the Kola Peninsula, landed somewhere on the White Sea coast and established trade relations with aboriginal people for walrus ivory. The Slavs and Saami people, who penetrated to this area in the early 12th century, could only hunt for small groups of walruses and came to the northern part of the White Sea from time to time. The Russian walrus hunting in that region started in the early 16th century. Purposeful and mass walrus hunting was stimulated by the exploration of the Arctic archipelagoes Novaya Zemlya and Spitsbergen with adjacent areas where the large walrus rookeries were concentrated. The collapse of Russian walrus hunting happened at the first half of the 19th century, being a result of interaction of both ecological and anthropological factors.

== See also ==
- Leonid Pavlovich Sabaneyev - a famous hunting expert of Imperial Russia
- Sergey Aksakov - author of many hunting and fishing tales
- A Sportsman's Sketches
- Peculiarities of the National Hunt

== Primary sources ==
- Кутепов, Н. И. Великокняжеская, царская и императорская охота на Руси. Т. 1-4, 1896-1911.
- (in Russian) Overview of Russian State Archive documents on court hunt
