= Myagkov =

Myagkov (Russian: Мягков from мягкий meaning soft) is a Russian masculine surname, its feminine counterpart is Myagkova. It may refer to

- Andrey Myagkov (1938–2021), Russian film and theater actor
- Viktor Myagkov (born 1985), Russian football player
