= Social revolution =

Revolution reorganizing a whole society

Social revolutions are sudden changes in the structure and nature of society. These revolutions are usually recognized as having transformed society, economy, culture, philosophy, and technology along with, though more than solely, the political systems.

== Overview ==
Theda Skocpol in her article "France, Russia, China: A Structural Analysis of Social Revolutions" states that social revolution is a "combination of thoroughgoing structural transformation and massive national and class upheavals". She comes to this definition by combining Samuel P. Huntington's definition that it "is a rapid, fundamental, and violent domestic change in the dominant values and myths of society, in its political institutions, social structure, leadership, and government activities and policies" and Vladimir Lenin's, which is that revolutions are "the festivals of the oppressed...[who act] as creators of a new social order". She also states that this definition excludes many revolutions, because they fail to meet either or both of the two parts of this definition.

Academics have identified certain factors that have mitigated the rise of revolutions. Many historians have held that the rise and spread of Methodism in Great Britain prevented the development of a revolution there. In addition to preaching the Christian Gospel, John Wesley and his Methodist followers visited those imprisoned, as well as the poor and aged, building hospitals and dispensaries which provided free healthcare for the masses. The sociologist William H. Swatos stated that "Methodist enthusiasm transformed men, summoning them to assert rational control over their own lives, while providing in its system of mutual discipline the psychological security necessary for autonomous conscience and liberal ideals to become internalized, an integrated part of the 'new men' ... regenerated by Wesleyan preaching." The practice of temperance among Methodists, as well as their rejection of gambling, allowed them to eliminate secondary poverty and accumulate capital. Individuals who attended Methodist chapels and Sunday schools "took into industrial and political life the qualities and talents they had developed within Methodism and used them on behalf of the working classes in non-revolutionary ways." The spread of the Methodist Church in Great Britain, author and professor Michael Hill states, "filled both a social and an ideological vacuum" in English society, thus "opening up the channels of social and ideological mobility ... which worked against the polarization of English society into rigid social classes." The historian Bernard Semmel argues that "Methodism was an antirevolutionary movement that succeeded (to the extent that it did) because it was a revolution of a radically different kind" that was capable of effecting social change on a large scale.

== Alternative theories ==
Skocpol distinguishes her theory from psychological theories of revolution ("aggregate psychological theories"), theories of systems and values, and theories about political conflicts. Ted Robert Gurr and his book Why Men Rebel is given as an example of a psychological theory with this theory explaining violence as a result of anger deriving from an inability of individuals to achieve or do the things they value a state called relative deprivation. Charles Tilly with this book From Mobilization to Revolution is given as an example of a political conflict theory. He argues that groups with resources competed for political power, and that changes in access to resources could result in revolution. Chalmers Johnson, with his book Revolutionary Change, discusses a value-based model. Society is modeled in terms of the coordination of different values realized through socialization, norms and rules, which then legitimize the political order. Johnson argues that revolution occurs when these values become disaligned. Skocpol also argues that Marxist theories can be useful for understanding revolutions but that they lack an explanation for when revolutions do and don't occur, not considering the role of the organization of the state in revolutions, focusing instead of the class structures.

Skocpol argues that while revolutions can be explained in terms of these sociological theories, it is difficult to work out which explanation is true because the concepts are so general. She argues that a comparative historical approach informed by concepts from sociology is useful.

== See also ==
- East Sumatra revolution
- Quiet Revolution
- Rojava Revolution
- Rwandan Revolution
- Social Revolution festival
- Sociology of Revolution
