= Bulavin =

Bulavin (Russian: Булавин) is a Russian male surname, its feminine counterpart is Bulavina. It may refer to

- Sergei Bulavin (born 1973), Russian association football player
- Vyacheslav Bulavin (born 1946), Russian association football coach and former player
- Vladimir Bulavin (born 1953), Russian official senior executive officer

== See also ==
- Bulavin Rebellion
