= Vyacheslav Lotoryov =

Russian footballer

Personal information
- Full name: Vyacheslav Yuryevich Lotoryov
- Date of birth: 23 June 1975 (age 51)
- Height: 1.66 m (5 ft 5 1/2 in)
- Position: Midfielder

Senior career*
Years	Team	Apps	(Gls)
1992	FC Shinnik Yaroslavl	4	(0)
1994	FC Baltika-2 Kaliningrad	10	(1)
1995	FC Luch Gusev		
1996–2001	FC Neftyanik Yaroslavl	182	(7)
2002–2003	FC Severstal Cherepovets	71	(10)
2004–2005	FC Fankom Manturovo		
- * Club domestic league appearances and goals

Vyacheslav Yuryevich Lotoryov (Russian: Вячеслав Юрьевич Лоторёв; born 23 June 1975) is a former Russian football player. In 1992, he debuted for FC Shinnik Yaroslavl.
