= Yaroslav Kharitonskiy =

Russian footballer

Personal information
- Full name: Yaroslav Vyacheslavovich Kharitonskiy
- Date of birth: 12 March 1985 (age 41)
- Place of birth: Yaroslavl, Russian SFSR
- Height: 1.86 m (6 ft 1 in)
- Positions: Defender; midfielder

Youth career
- FC Shinnik Yaroslavl

Senior career*
Years	Team	Apps	(Gls)
2001	FC Neftyanik Yaroslavl	5	(0)
2002–2006	FC Shinnik Yaroslavl	1	(0)
2007	FC SKA-Energiya Khabarovsk	2	(0)
2008	FC Saturn-2 Moscow Oblast	26	(2)
2009	FC Volga Nizhny Novgorod	5	(0)
2011	FC Shinnik-M Yaroslavl	4	(1)
- * Club domestic league appearances and goals

Yaroslav Vyacheslavovich Kharitonskiy (Russian: Ярослав Вячеславович Харитонский; born 12 March 1985) is a former Russian professional footballer.

== Club career ==
He made his professional debut in the Russian Second Division in 2001 for FC Neftyanik Yaroslavl. He played 1 game and scored 1 goal in the UEFA Intertoto Cup 2004 for FC Shinnik Yaroslavl.

He is best known for receiving a serious injury (double leg fracture) 10 minutes into his Russian Premier League debut from a tackle by Emanuel Pogatetz, which led to 8-week disqualification for Pogatetz.
