= Andrei Galyanov =

Russian footballer

Personal information
- Full name: Andrei Vyacheslavovich Galyanov
- Date of birth: 5 April 1973 (age 53)
- Place of birth: Yaroslavl, Russian SFSR
- Height: 1.82 m (6 ft 0 in)
- Position: Midfielder

Youth career
- Yaroslavets Yaroslavl

Senior career*
| Years | Team | Apps | (Gls) |
| 1990–1991 | FC Spartak Kostroma | 42 | (0) |
| 1992–1993 | FC Lada Dimitrovgrad | 32 | (1) |
| 1995 | FC Neftyanik Yaroslavl | 24 | (5) |
| 1996–1999 | FC Shinnik Yaroslavl | 61 | (6) |
| 2000 | FC Baltika Kaliningrad | 18 | (1) |
| 2002 | FC Lokomotiv Chita | 3 | (0) |
| 2002 | FC Neftyanik Yaroslavl | 14 | (1) |
- * Club domestic league appearances and goals

Andrei Vyacheslavovich Galyanov (Russian: Андрей Вячеславович Гальянов; born 5 April 1973) is a Russian former professional footballer.

== Club career ==
He made his professional debut in the Soviet Second League B in 1990 for FC Spartak Kostroma. He played 4 games in the UEFA Intertoto Cup 1998 for FC Shinnik Yaroslavl.
