= Aleksandr Chistyakov (footballer, born 1980) =

Russian footballer

Personal information
- Full name: Aleksandr Vyacheslavovich Chistyakov
- Date of birth: 16 February 1980 (age 46)
- Place of birth: Yaroslavl, Russian SFSR
- Height: 1.75 m (5 ft 9 in)
- Position: Defender

Youth career
- FC Shinnik Yaroslavl

Senior career*
Years	Team	Apps	(Gls)
1998–2001	FC Neftyanik Yaroslavl	119	(15)
2002	FC Lokomotiv Chita	22	(1)
2003	FC Baltika Kaliningrad	0	(0)
2003	FC Biokhimik-Mordovia Saransk	16	(2)
2004–2006	FC Chita	111	(1)
2007	FC Zvezda Irkutsk	24	(1)
2008–2009	FC Nizhny Novgorod	27	(0)
2010	FC Zvezda Ryazan	10	(0)
- * Club domestic league appearances and goals

Aleksandr Vyacheslavovich Chistyakov (Russian: Александр Вячеславович Чистяков; born 16 February 1980) is a former Russian professional football player.

== Club career ==
He played 5 seasons in the Russian Football National League for FC Lokomotiv Chita, FC Zvezda Irkutsk and FC Nizhny Novgorod.
