= Aleksandr Kalinin =

Aleksandr Kalinin, Alexandr Kalinin, or Alexander Kalinin (variant transliterations of Russian: Алекса́ндр Кали́нин) may refer to:

- Aleksandr Kalinin (footballer) (born 1975), Russian football player and coach
- Alexandr Kalinin (politician), Moldovan politician
- Aleksandr Kalinin (chess player) (born 1968), Russian chess grandmaster and coach
- Aleksandr Kalinin (Soviet military commander) (1910–1962), Hero of the Soviet Union
- Aleksandr Kalinin (skating) (born 1944), Russian skating coach
