= Vasili Chernitsyn =

Russian footballer

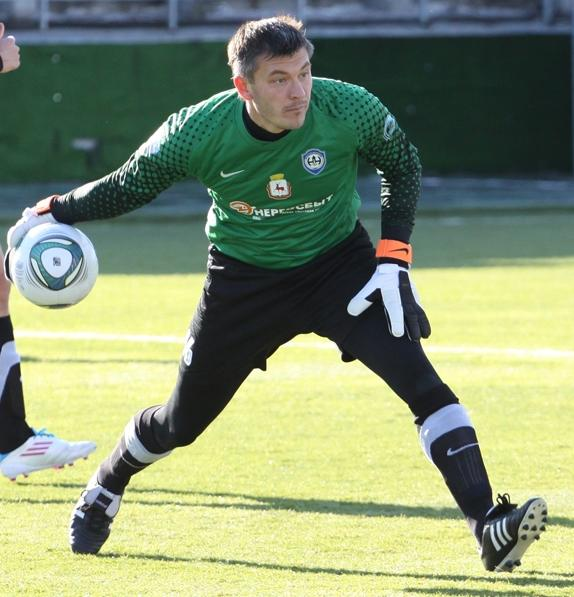
- Chernitsyn with Nizhny Novgorod in 2012

Personal information
- Full name: Vasili Yuryevich Chernitsyn
- Date of birth: 15 May 1977 (age 49)
- Height: 1.88 m (6 ft 2 in)
- Position: Goalkeeper

Senior career*
| Years | Team | Apps | (Gls) |
| 1994–1995 | FC Neftyanik Yaroslavl | 31 | (0) |
| 1996 | FC Dynamo Vologda | 17 | (0) |
| 1997–1999 | FC Shinnik Yaroslavl | 2 | (0) |
| 2000 | FC Oazis Yartsevo | 26 | (0) |
| 2001 | FC Severstal Cherepovets | 28 | (0) |
| 2002 | FC Kolomna | 23 | (0) |
| 2003–2006 | FC Spartak Lukhovitsy | 110 | (1) |
| 2007–2009 | FC Vityaz Podolsk | 53 | (0) |
| 2010–2012 | FC Nizhny Novgorod | 27 | (0) |
| 2012 | FC Zenit Penza | 5 | (0) |
| 2013–2014 | FC Kolomna | 21 | (0) |
- * Club domestic league appearances and goals

Vasili Yuryevich Chernitsyn (Russian: Василий Юрьевич Черницын; born 15 May 1977) is a Russian former professional footballer who played as a goalkeeper. He made his debut in the Russian Premier League in 1999 for FC Shinnik Yaroslavl.
