= Igor Shtukin =

Russian footballer

Personal information
- Full name: Igor Aleksandrovich Shtukin
- Date of birth: 11 December 1985 (age 40)
- Place of birth: Yaroslavl, Russia
- Height: 1.88 m (6 ft 2 in)
- Position: Midfielder

Senior career*
| Years | Team | Apps | (Gls) |
| 2001 | FC Neftyanik Yaroslavl | 2 | (0) |
| 2002–2004 | FC Shinnik Yaroslavl | 0 | (0) |
| 2004 | FC Tekstilshchik-Telekom Ivanovo | 11 | (1) |
| 2005 | FC Spartak Kostroma | 27 | (3) |
| 2006 | FC Avangard Kursk | 25 | (1) |
| 2007 | FC Zvezda Irkutsk | 25 | (2) |
| 2008 | FC Dynamo-Voronezh Voronezh | 32 | (6) |
| 2009 | FC Gubkin | 16 | (2) |
| 2009–2010 | FC Sheksna Cherepovets | 40 | (1) |
| 2011–2012 | FC Metallurg-Oskol Stary Oskol | 25 | (2) |
- * Club domestic league appearances and goals

Igor Aleksandrovich Shtukin (Russian: Игорь Александрович Штукин; born 11 December 1985) is a former Russian professional footballer.

== Club career ==
Shtukin played three games in the UEFA Intertoto Cup 2004 for FC Shinnik Yaroslavl. He played two seasons in the Russian Football National League, for FC Avangard Kursk and FC Zvezda Irkutsk.
