= Ilya Tkachyov =

Russian footballer

Personal information
- Full name: Ilya Vladimirovich Tkachyov
- Date of birth: 10 June 1982 (age 44)
- Place of birth: Yaroslavl, Russian SFSR, Soviet Union
- Height: 1.78 m (5 ft 10 in)
- Positions: Defender; midfielder

Senior career*
Years	Team	Apps	(Gls)
1998	FC Slavich Pereslavl-Zalessky		
1999–2002	FC Neftyanik Yaroslavl	96	(6)
2003	FC Rybinsk (amateur)		
2003	FC Shinnik-2 Yaroslavl		
2004	FC Shinnik Yaroslavl	0	(0)
2004–2005	FC Shinnik-2-Vodokanal Yaroslavl		
2005	FC Shinnik Yaroslavl	0	(0)
2007–2008	FC Chita	37	(0)
2009	FC Amur Blagoveshchensk	15	(0)
2010	FC Kooperator Vichuga		
- * Club domestic league appearances and goals

Ilya Vladimirovich Tkachyov (Russian: Илья Владимирович Ткачёв; born 10 June 1982) is a former Russian professional footballer.

== Club career ==
He made his debut for FC Shinnik Yaroslavl on 3 July 2004 in an Intertoto Cup game against FK Teplice. He also appeared for Shinnik twice in the Russian Cup.
