= Ilya Davydov =

Russian ice hockey player (born 1989)

- Born: January 25, 1989 (age 36); Yaroslavl, Russia
- Height: 6 ft 0 in (183 cm)
- Weight: 198 lb (90 kg; 14 st 2 lb)
- Position: Defence
- Shoots: Left
- VHL team Former teams: HC Rostov; Avtomobilist Yekaterinburg; Torpedo Nizhny Novgorod; Admiral Vladivostok; Traktor Chelyabinsk; Vityaz Podolsk; Metallurg Novokuznetsk; HK Poprad
- Playing career: 2010–present

Ilya Davydov (born January 25, 1989) is a Russian professional ice hockey defenceman. He is currently playing with HC Rostov in the Supreme Hockey League (VHL). He has formerly played in the Kontinental Hockey League (KHL).
