= Yevgeni Martyanov =

Russian footballer and coach

Personal information
- Full name: Yevgeni Aleksandrovich Martyanov
- Date of birth: 27 April 1959 (age 67)
- Place of birth: Yaroslavl, Russian SFSR
- Height: 1.72 m (5 ft 7 1/2 in)
- Position: Midfielder

Team information
- Current team: FC Shinnik Yaroslavl (youth teams manager)

Youth career
- Yaroslavets Yaroslavl

Senior career*
Years	Team	Apps	(Gls)
1977–1978	FC Shinnik Yaroslavl	7	(0)
1979–1980	FC Iskra Smolensk		
1980	FC Torpedo Togliatti		
1981–1992	FC Shinnik Yaroslavl	405	(34)
1993	FC Okean Nakhodka	33	(0)
1994	FC Spartak Anapa	8	(0)

Managerial career
- 1999–: FC Shinnik Yaroslavl (youth teams)
- * Club domestic league appearances and goals

Yevgeni Aleksandrovich Martyanov (Russian: Евгений Александрович Мартьянов; born 27 April 1959) is a Russian professional football coach and a former player. Since late 1990s, he works as a youth teams coach with FC Shinnik Yaroslavl.

== Club career ==
He made his professional debut in the Soviet First League in 1977 for FC Shinnik Yaroslavl.
