= Simon Rastorguev =

Russian architect (born 1981)

- Семён Васи́льевич Расторгу́ев
- Born: 1981 (age 44–45); Yaroslavl, USSR
- Education: Yaroslavl State Technical University
- Occupation: Architect
- Website: Official website

Simon Vasilevich Rastorguev (Семён Васи́льевич Расторгу́ев; born 1981 in Yaroslavl) is a Russian architect specialising in reconstruction-restoration.

== Biography ==
Rastorguev studied architecture at Yaroslavl State Technical University and later finished a postgraduate course in cultural studies and journalism. He has worked with the Moscow-based firm Project Meganom and is the editor-in-chief of Chaos Research Center, a blog about conceptual architecture. As of 2017, he led the Simon Rastorguev Design Group. As an organiser of the Social Revolution festival, he held an architectural competition focused on social housing in 2012; the PARKing competition in 2013; and a design competition for an architectural work underneath a bridge in 2014; among others. He also spoke on the grotesque at the 2013 rendition of the festival.

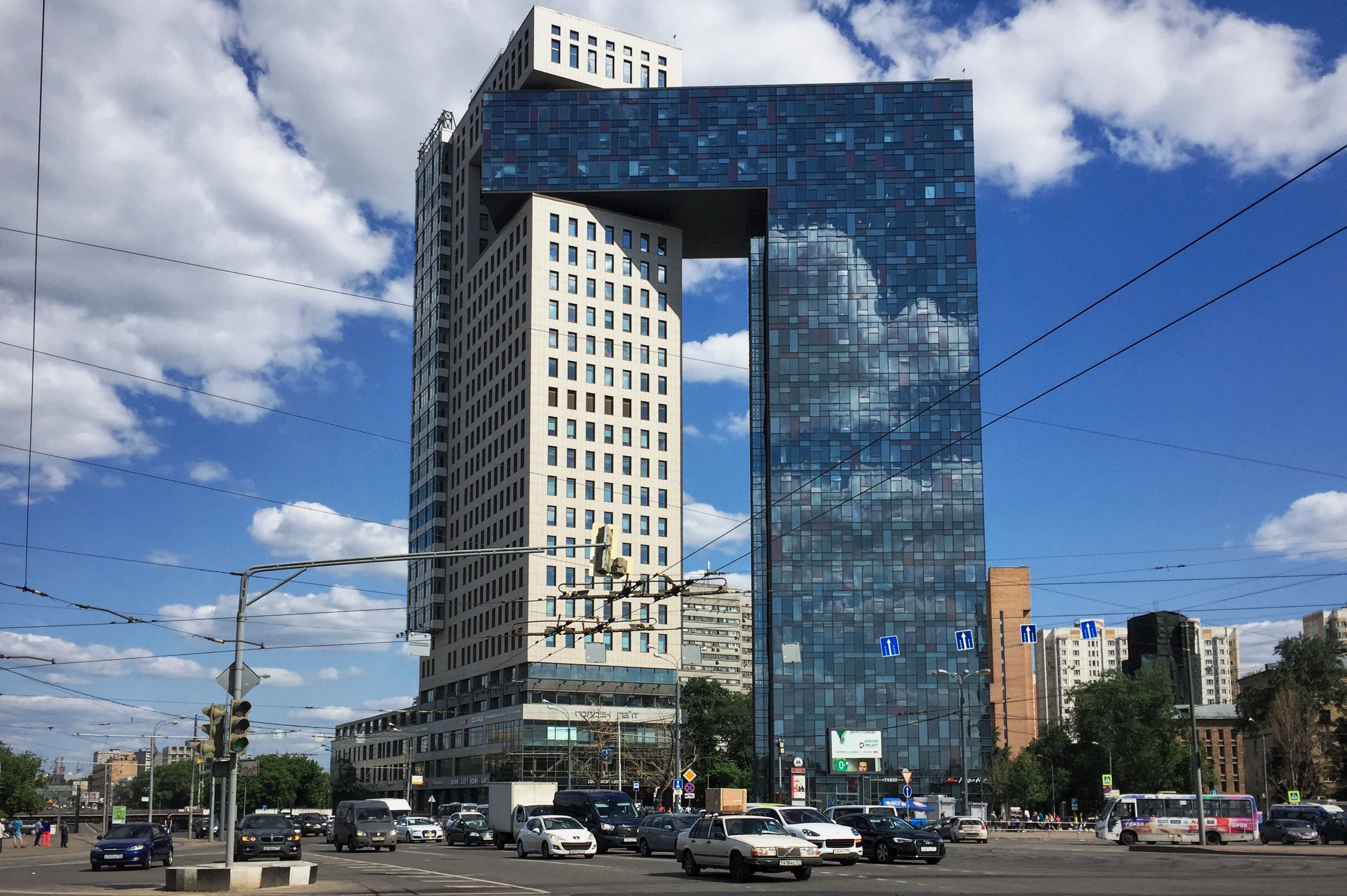
Bitrix 24 offices in Moscow

Throughout his career, Rastorguev has created digital renderings of cities, business centers, and buildings, including as part of the millennium celebration of Yaroslavl; a futuristic multifunctional complex in Burabay, Kazakhstan called the Borovoye-Biocity; a self-sustaining cottage resembling a hedgehog; and a reconstruction of Volkov Square in Yaroslavl. He oversaw a large-scale project in 2022-2024 that showed around one hundred planned but unrealised buildings in Moscow between 1920-1970.

Rastorguev exhibited at the Venice Biennale in 2004, 2008, and 2014: Laguna Proun, a settlement that minimally disturbs the laguna ecosystem (2004); Bornhouse at San Stae (2008); and City of Money (2014). His work was featured at the Moscow Biennale in 2007 and 2008 (Persimfance). Among his other exhibitions are BioCity, 2002 (Berlin); City of the Young, 2002—2004 (TSSI "ARS-Forum"); BIRDS, 2003; Cottage village "Ogorodnik sleep," 2005 (Barcelona);; Grass City, 2010 (St. Petersburg); and Guilty Money, 2011 (Moscow).

He participated in the Arch Moscow international exhibitions held by Architecture and Design between 2007 and 2013; in the Dom-Avtonom competitions for self-sustaining houses between 2007 and 2009; and in the architectural festival Golden chapiter in Novosibirsk in 2009. An image of Rastorguev's work appeared on the cover of the September-October 2002 issue of Build architecture magazine. In 2011, a documentary in the "30-year-old..." series about young talent covered his career.

His realised projects include:

- 2005 - Tsargrad hotel and restaurant (Yaroslavl)
- 2016 - Parametric Residence (Uspenskoe, Odintsovo), private resident
- 2017 - Bitrix 24 office (Moscow)
- 2019 - North Park apartment (Moscow), private resident

== Awards ==
Year	Award	Awarding Body	Project	Notes	Refs
2002	Atlas on Architecture of the Future	International Union of Architects	Organic City	With Mikhail Kudryashov	
2004	First place	Workshop Russia, Venice Biennale	Yaroslavl-Millennium		
2005	Five Facades of Private Architecture		Cottage village "Ogorodnik sleep"	All-Russian competition	
2005	Advanced Architecture Contest		Cottage village "Ogorodnik sleep"		
2008	Dom-Avtonom	World Architecture Community	Self-sustaining houses project		
2009		World Architecture Community	Green Oasis		
2014	Long-listed for exhibition competition	Jacques Rougerie Foundation	Stream City		

== Select publications ==
- "Agora Dreams and Visions". l'Arca. No. 183. Summer 2003. pp. 39–43 – via Issuu.
- Современная интервенция в Лагуну [Contemporary intervention in Laguna]. Project Russia (in Russian). No. 35. Archived from the original on 11 April 2007.
- "Se la città è mutante" [Visions of a mutant city] (PDF). arcVision (in Italian). No. 53. June 2007. pp. 80–85. Archived from the original (PDF) on 28 September 2007.
- "Russia: Arquitectura despues del comunismo" [Russia: Architecture after communism]. Codigo (in Spanish). No. 6140. Summer 2007.
- Которосль – 2010: Ярославский MILLENNIUM [Kotorosl 2010. Yaroslavl Millennium]. Domus (in Russian). No. 8–09. September 2009. pp. 72–82.
- Настоящая архитектура непредсказуема [Real architecture is unpredictable]. Tatlin Mono (in Russian). Vol. 3, no. 32. 2011. pp. 132–139.
