= Andrei Kruchin =

Russian footballer

Personal information
- Full name: Andrei Aleksandrovich Kruchin
- Date of birth: 6 October 1970 (age 56)
- Place of birth: Yaroslavl, Russian SFSR
- Height: 1.89 m (6 ft 2 1/2 in)
- Positions: Defender; forward

Youth career
- Yaroslavets Yaroslavl

Senior career*
Years	Team	Apps	(Gls)
1990	FC Uralets Uralsk	29	(2)
1991	FC SKA Rostov-on-Don	4	(0)
1991	FC Rostselmash Rostov-on-Don	18	(2)
1992–1995	FC Shinnik Yaroslavl	81	(5)
1995	FC Gekris Anapa	10	(1)
1996	FC Spartak Shchyolkovo	17	(3)
1996	FC Metallurg Lipetsk	2	(0)
1997	FC Samotlor-XXI Nizhnevartovsk	0	(0)
1997	FC Alyans Anapa		
1998	FC Anapa	14	(1)
1998	FC Krasnoznamensk-Selyatino Krasnoznamensk	17	(3)
2000	FC Vityaz Podolsk (amateur)		
2001–2002	FC Vityaz Podolsk	29	(0)
2002	FC Kolomna	11	(0)
2003	SK Torpedo-ZIL Moscow		
2004	FC Boyevoye Bratstvo Pushkino		
- * Club domestic league appearances and goals

Andrei Aleksandrovich Kruchin (Russian: Андрей Александрович Кручин; born 6 October 1970) is a former Russian football player.
