= Anatoĺ Kalinin =

Belarusian politician

Anatoĺ Mikalajevič Kalinin (Belarusian: Анато́ль Мікала́евіч Калі́нін, Russian: Анато́лий Никола́евич Кали́нин; born 21 June 1959 in Krasnapolle, Mogilev Region) is a Belarusian politician and diplomat who served as the deputy prime minister in the government of president Aleksandr Lukashenko and Belarusian ambassador to the Republic of Moldova.

== Career ==
Kalinin began his career as a driver at the consumer union of Krasnapolle between 1976 and 1977. From 1977 to 1979 he served in the Soviet Army before leaving to join agricultural machines enterprise of Krasnapolle where he worked as chief engineer from 1983 to 1988. He was director of Krasnapolle district association of housing and communal services between 1988 and 1990.

In 1993 he graduated from Belarusian Agricultural Academy. In 2008 he graduated from the Academy of Public Administration.

In 2009-2010 he was an aide to President Lukashenko and the head inspector for the city of Minsk.

In December 2010 he was appointed deputy Prime Minister in the government of president Aleksandr Lukashenko.

He was removed from the position of Deputy Prime Minister and appointed Belarusian Ambassador Extraordinary and Plenipotentiary to the Republic of Moldova and presented his letters of credence to Moldovan prime minister Natalia Gavrilița on 18 February 2022. Kalinin held that position until March 27, 2025.
