= Social Revolution festival =

The Social Revolution festival is the first architecture festival in Yaroslavl, Russia. The main theme and the motto of the festival is: "Answers of architects to the questions of the city". The festival was held twice, first from 1 to 11 May 2012 and again from 3 to 17 June 2013.

== Social Revolution 2012 ==
The festival was focused on the idea of social housing development in Yaroslavl. The motto of the festival: "House for the price of the car".

== Social Revolution 2013 ==
The festival was dedicated to the creation of functional objects of the urban environment for relaxing and socializing citizens, for family and youth communication, integration of different social and age groups and people with disabilities. The international architectural competition "PARKing" was a part of the Festival. The aim the competition was a creation land art objects and street furniture in the city center, in a park on the Tchaikovsky street.

== The main events of the festival ==
=== Building of the architectural object "Stack It" ===
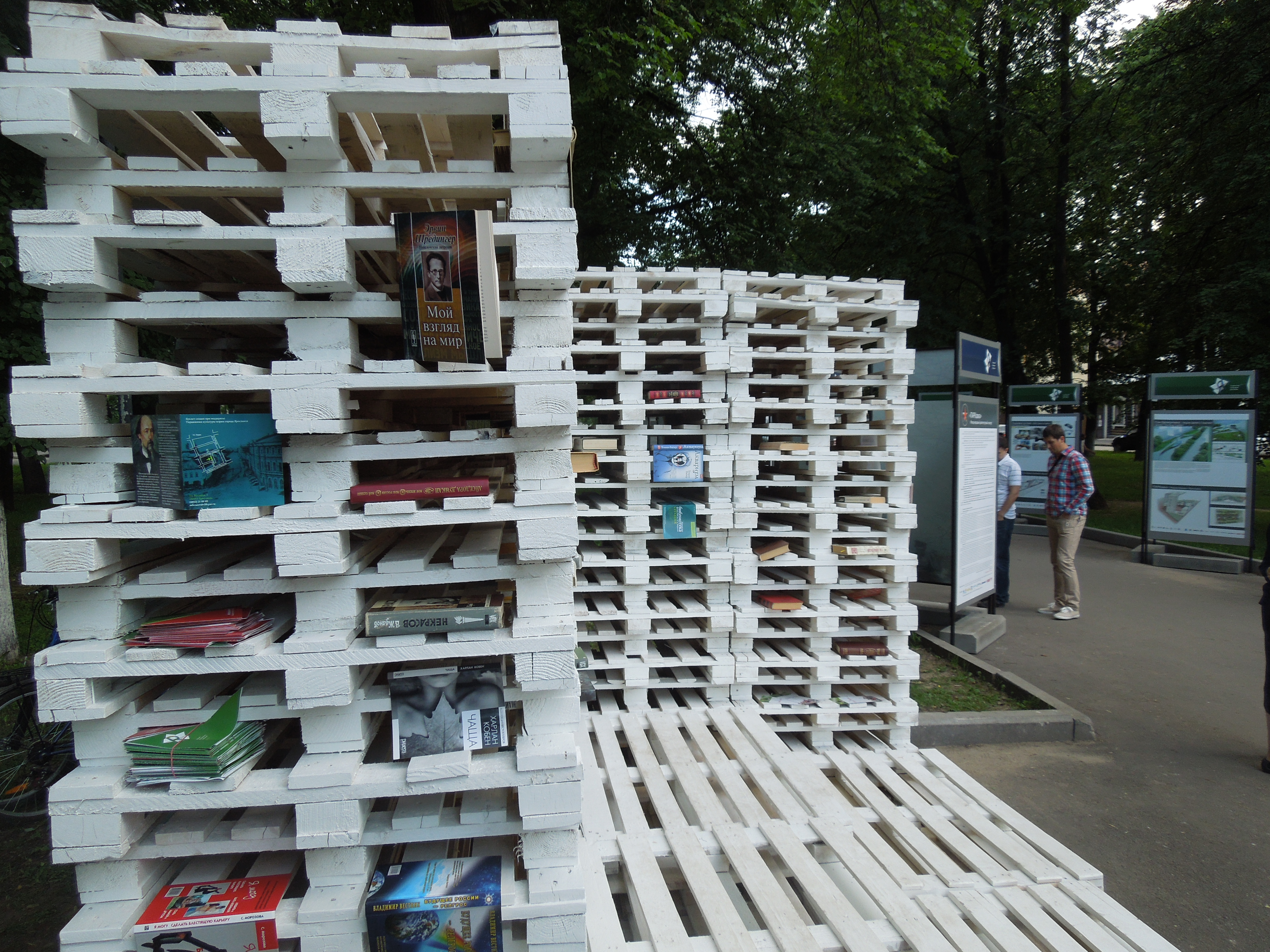
Architectural object «Stack It» on the Tchaikovsky St.

Date of the event: June 1–3, 2013.
Location: Tchaikovsky St., Yaroslavl, Russia

=== Lecture space of the festival: "Maximum" gallery. ===
Date of the event: June 9–16, 2013
Location: Soviet St. 2a, Yaroslavl, Russia

This event included lectures:
Nikolai Malinin, architecture critic: "Not about the house: Russian wooden architecture of public purpose in the 20th century";
Gregory Dainov, architect: "Architect and society. Dialogue and confrontation";
Natalia Mastalerzh, architect: "Center, public space. From the point system";
Maria Belova, architect: "Hybrids – efficiency of residential social model";
Natalia Stepanova, architect: "Development of the strategy of cycling infrastructure in Yaroslavl";
Architectural Group "ABO": "Between the trend and meaning. Environmental projects in Vologda";
Simon Rastorguev, architect, curator: "Grotesque in architecture on example of the international architectural competition "Gourmanization of the Space".

=== Construction of the playground ===
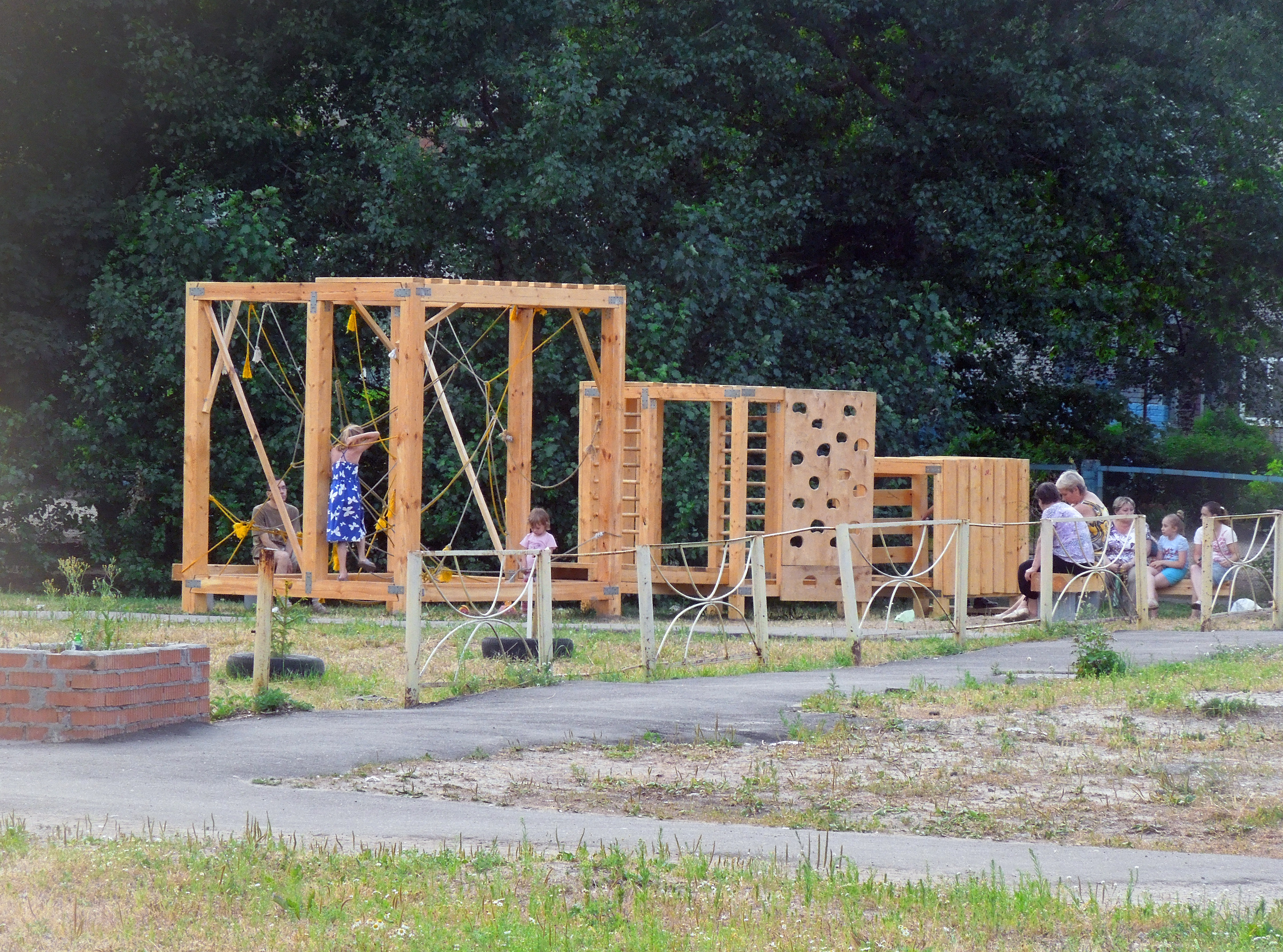
Playground was built during the Social Revolution festival '013

Event date: June 15, 2013
Location: Dobrokhotova St., Yaroslavl, Russia
Participants: Association of practicing architects "KrombiTTraksorm"

=== International architectural competition "Under the Bridge" ===
Dates: April 2 – June 15, 2014
Territory of the project: Tolbuhinsky and Dobryninsky bridges, Yaroslavl, Russia
Results: the projects of architectural objects will be presented at the exhibition and public discussion, which will be held during the Social Revolution festival 2014. Website of the competition.

=== International architectural competition "PARKing" ===
Dates: February 1 – May 1, 2013
Territory of the project: Tchaikovsky St., Yaroslavl, Russia
Results: 61 projects of architectural objects, which were presented at the exhibition, which took place on the street Tchaikovsky and in the virtual gallery of a projects.

=== International architectural competition "Architecture & Food" ===
Dates: January 10 – April 10, 2013
Territory of the project: October Ave. 56, Yaroslavl, Russia
Results: 44 projects of the cafe veranda and pavilions were presented at the exhibition, which took place at October Ave. 56 and in the virtual gallery of projects. Projects – winners will be realized in 2014.

=== International architectural competition "The revolution of social housing" ===
Dates: from January 1 to April 29, 2012
Territory of design: Tolga settlement, Yaroslavl, Russia
Results: 54 projects of social houses are presented on permanent exhibition at the Department of Architecture YaSTU and on the competition website.
