= Vyacheslav Solovyov (serial killer) =

Russian serial killer and poisoner

- Born: Vyacheslav Valeryevich Solovyov; 12 March 1970; Yaroslavl, Yaroslavl Oblast, RSFSR
- Died: 2 December 2008 (aged 38); Yaroslavl, Yaroslavl Oblast, Russia
- Other names: "The Yaroslavl Poisoner" "The Bluebeard of Yaroslavl" "The Mysterious Poisoner" "The Bragin Maniac" "The Yaroslavl Salieri"
- Conviction: Murder
- Penalty: Life imprisonment

Details
- Victims: 6
- Span of crimes: 2003–2007
- Country: Russia
- State: Yaroslavl
- Date apprehended: March 2007

Vyacheslav Valeryevich Solovyov (Russian: Вячесла́в Вале́рьевич Соловьёв; 12 March 1970 – 2 December 2008), known as The Yaroslavl Poisoner (Russian: Ярославский отравитель, romanized: Yaroslavsky otravitel), was a Russian serial killer and poisoner. He poisoned six people, including his wife and daughter.

== Preparing for the murders ==
Between 2001 and 2002, the Yaroslavl resident became seriously interested in the effect of poisons on humans. "I was interested that you can kill a man and leave no traces", Solovyov later said during the investigation. The investigators believed that he gained interest from the film "The Young Poisoner's Handbook", based on the biography of poisoner Graham Young, then proceeded to search for the poison - he studied special literature, searched for information on the Internet, tried to synthesize the poison from the originating plant, but did not succeed. Subsequently, according to the prosecutor's office, he bought at one of the regional enterprises a number of toxic chemicals, including 400 grams of thallium sulfate and sodium azide, which would later be used for the murders. The investigation could not establish from where Solovyov bought the poison. Thallium poisoning is difficult to recognize, because symptoms are very similar to diseases. Solovyov also probably chose thallium due to a lasting impression from reading Agatha Christie's "The Pale Horse", in which the killer uses thallium, stressing the fact that the substance is hard to trace.

== Murders ==
Solovyov chose his wife Olga as his first victim, with whom he had been since school. They had lived together for 14 years. For a while, he threw small amounts of poison into her food, which caused her to die on 9 December 2003. The doctors could not establish that it was poisoning.

The next victim was to be Solovyov's neighbour, whom he suspected of stealing a car battery, but as a result of a tragic combination of circumstances, Solovyov's 14-year-old daughter Nastya ate a poisoned red caviar from the can. Despite being seriously ill, she still decided to attend school. After six months of failed attempts to cure the girl, she died. Of course, Solovyov did not tell the doctors that he had poisoned her.

The next victim was Solovyov's common-law wife Irina Astakhova, who died in hospital on 3 May 2005. The doctors found irreversible lesions on the liver and kidneys.

Solovyov, in a peculiar way, "experimented" with poisons, pouring them in small doses to a number of colleagues at work, who suddenly began to have health problems - aches in joints, hair loss, vomiting and diarrhea.

In the fall of 2006, Solovyov moved to live with Oksana Gurieva, who worked as an acrobatics trainer and had two little daughters. Soon he used the poison - while visiting Oksana's grandmother, he poured thallium into the decanter. The very healthy Oksana safely tolerated the poisoning, finding it to be a serious complication of the flu, but her grandmother Taisiya Iosifovna soon died.

The next poisoning was particularly insolent - Solovyov poured poison into the investigator Shcherbakov's coffee directly at the interrogation in the case in which Solovyov took part. And again, doctors did not establish the poisoning.

Solovyov then tried to poison his sister Oksana and her family - he poured poison into the jar, in which they distilled drinking water. Oksana and her husband survived in the hospital, but their 1-year-old child passed away. In this case, the appearance of the same symptoms in the whole family interested law enforcement. The examination found that there was poisoning with salts from heavy metals, and the investigation led to Solovyov, around whom people perished too often for suspicious reasons. In March 2007, he was arrested.

== Trial and death ==
After the first meeting, the defendant attempted suicide by cutting open his veins. After a break, the hearing resumed, and the examination found that Solovyov was imputed. The court found him guilty of 6 murders committed with special cruelty, and many attempted ones. Before the announcement of the verdict, Solovyov expressed remorse for his crimes and said that he would not ask for forgiveness from the victims' families, as he knew he would get none. He was sentenced to life imprisonment. On the night of 2 December, Solovyov died in the cell of the pre-trial detention centre, with the forensic medical examination finding that the cause of death was phlegmon - purulent inflammation of the subcutaneous tissues. Experts expressed the opinion that Solovyov's health was weakened thoroughly by experimenting with poisons, many of which he tested on himself.

== In the media ==
- Documentary film "The Bluebeard of Yaroslavl" from Vakhtang Mikeladze's series "Sentenced for Life"

== See also ==
- Tamara Ivanyutina
- Graham Young
- List of Russian serial killers
