= Kirill Gavrilychev =

Russian ice hockey player

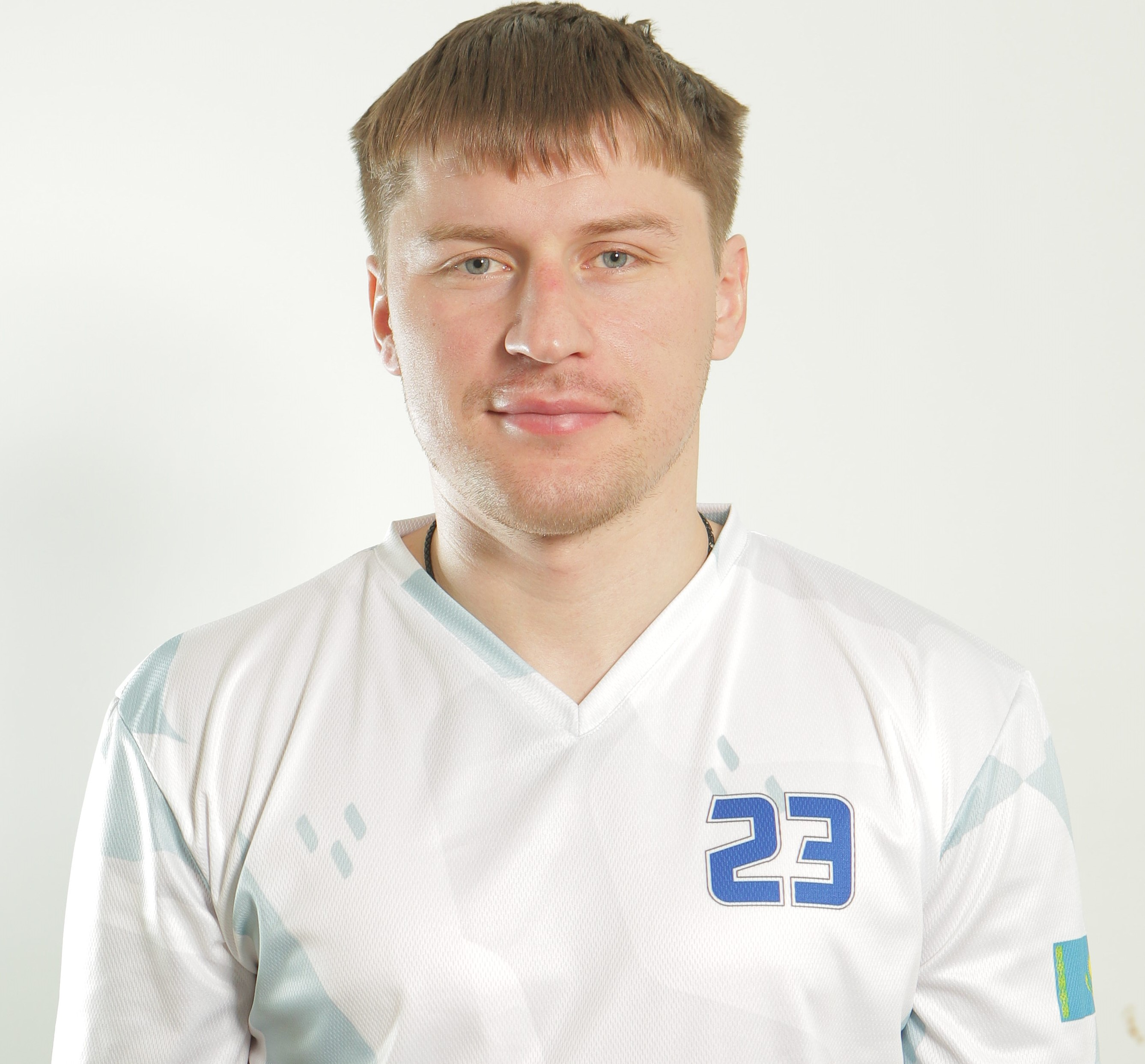
- Born: February 21, 1989 (age 36) Yaroslavl, Russian SFSR
- Height: 6 ft 0 in (183 cm)
- Weight: 212 lb (96 kg; 15 st 2 lb)
- Position: Defence
- Shoots: Left
- VHL team Former teams: Yermak Angarsk; Metallurg Novokuznetsk; Spartak Moscow
- Playing career: 2010–present

Kirill Gavrilychev (born February 21, 1989) is a Russian professional ice hockey defenceman. He is currently playing with Yermak Angarsk of the Supreme Hockey League (VHL).

Gavrilychev made his Kontinental Hockey League debut playing with Metallurg Novokuznetsk during the 2014–15 KHL season.
