= Sergei Kalinin =

Sergei Kalinin or Sergey Kalinin may refer to:

- Sergei Kalinin (sport shooter) (1926–1997), Russian Olympic shooter
- Sergei Kalinin (actor) (1896–1971), Russian actor in Resurrection
- Sergei Kalinin (ice hockey) (born 1991), Russian ice hockey forward
- Sergei V. Kalinin, director of the Institute for Functional Imaging of Materials
