= Karina Metelkova =

Russian rhythmic gymnast (born 2003)

- Born: 11 May 2003 (age 23) Yaroslavl, Russia

Gymnastics career
- Discipline: Rhythmic gymnastics
- Country represented: Russia (2021)
- Gym: Novogorsk
- Head coach: Irina Viner
- Assistant coach: Tatiana Sergaeva
Medal record
Group rhythmic gymnastics
Representing Russia
European Championships
| Gold medal – first place | 2021 Varna | Team |
| Gold medal – first place | 2021 Varna | Group All-around |
| Silver medal – second place | 2021 Varna | 5 Balls |

Karina Metelkova (Russian: Карина Метелкова; born 11 May 2003) is a Russian group rhythmic gymnast. She is the 2021 European Group All-around champion.

== Career ==
=== Senior ===
In 2020, Karina joined Russian National Reserve Team as a senior group gymnast. Reserve group took part in Grand Prix Tartu in February. Karina and her teammates placed second in Group All-Around competition after Uzbekistan and took gold medals in both Apparatus Finals. In October, Russian Federation organized 2nd Online Tournament in rhythmic gymnastics, where reserve group won in Group All-Around competition (69.050) in front of Uzbekistan. In the end of May 2021, she competed at the 2021 Pesaro World Cup, her first World Cup, where she won gold medal in Group All-around and two silver medals in Apparatus finals. In June, she competed at the 2021 European Championships in Varna, Bulgaria and won gold medal in Group All-around and Team competition and silver in 5 Balls final. In July, the national coach Irina Viner, announced that the fifth place of the Russian group that will compete in the Olympic Games of Tokyo 2020, will be occupied by Alisa Tishchenko, leaving out Metelkova and Olya Karaseva
