= Pershino =

Pershino Першино
- Village
- Location within Vladimir Oblast Location within Russia
- Coordinates: 55°59′N 42°22′E
- Country: Russia
- Region: Vladimir Oblast
- District: Gorokhovetsky District
- Time zone: UTC+3:00

Pershino (Russian: Першино) is a rural locality (a village) in Fominskoye Rural Settlement, Gorokhovetsky District, Vladimir Oblast, Russia. The population was 6 as of 2010.

== Geography ==
Pershino is located 37 km southwest of Gorokhovets (the district's administrative centre) by road. Borzakovo is the nearest rural locality.
