= Sergei Bulavin =

Russian footballer

Personal information
- Full name: Sergei Viktorovich Bulavin
- Date of birth: 19 January 1973 (age 53)
- Place of birth: Yaroslavl, Russian SFSR
- Height: 1.79 m (5 ft 10 1/2 in)
- Position: Midfielder

Youth career
- Yaroslavets Yaroslavl

Senior career*
Years	Team	Apps	(Gls)
1993	FC Neftyanik Yaroslavl (amateur)		
1994–1998	FC Neftyanik Yaroslavl	122	(16)
1998	FC Shinnik Yaroslavl	3	(0)
1999	FC Neftyanik Yaroslavl	36	(10)
2000–2001	FC Severstal Cherepovets	72	(17)
2002	FC Arsenal Tula	36	(5)
2008	FC NKZ-Shinnik Yaroslavl		
2009	FC Dynamo Kostroma (amateur)		
- * Club domestic league appearances and goals

Sergei Viktorovich Bulavin (Russian: Сергей Викторович Булавин; born 19 January 1973) is a former Russian football player who is known for his performance for FC Neftyanik Yaroslavl and FC Severstal Cherepovets in the Russian Second Division.

Bulavin played in the Russian Premier League with FC Shinnik Yaroslavl.
