= Aleksandr Kalinin (footballer) =

Russian footballer and coach

Personal information
- Full name: Aleksandr Dmitriyevich Kalinin
- Date of birth: 1 January 1975 (age 51)
- Place of birth: Yaroslavl, Russian SFSR
- Height: 1.71 m (5 ft 7 1/2 in)
- Position: Defender

Youth career
- FC Shinnik Yaroslavl

Senior career*
Years	Team	Apps	(Gls)
1992	FC Shinnik Yaroslavl	1	(0)
1993	FC Spartak Kostroma	23	(1)
1993	FC Neftyanik Yaroslavl (amateur)		
1994–1995	FC Neftyanik Yaroslavl	35	(0)
1996–1997	FC Dynamo Vologda	59	(1)
1998–2000	FC Neftyanik Yaroslavl	73	(0)
2001–2002	FC Dynamo Vologda	72	(1)
2003	FC Rybinsk (amateur)		
2003–2004	FC Pskov-2000 Pskov	29	(0)
2004	FC Spartak Kostroma	4	(0)
2005–2006	FC Don Novomoskovsk	62	(0)
2011–2012	FC Shinnik-M Yaroslavl		

Managerial career
- 2008: FC Shinnik Yaroslavl (conditioning coach)
- 2013–2015: FC Znamya Truda Orekhovo-Zuyevo (assistant)
- 2015: FC Spartak Kostroma (assistant)
- * Club domestic league appearances and goals

Aleksandr Dmitriyevich Kalinin (Russian: Александр Дмитриевич Калинин; born 1 January 1975) is a Russian football coach and a former player.
