= Viktor Myagkov =

Russian footballer

Personal information
- Full name: Viktor Alekseyevich Myagkov
- Date of birth: 2 February 1985 (age 41)
- Place of birth: Yaroslavl, Russian SFSR
- Height: 1.68 m (5 ft 6 in)
- Position: Forward

Youth career
- FC Shinnik Yaroslavl

Senior career*
Years	Team	Apps	(Gls)
2001	FC Neftyanik Yaroslavl	3	(0)
2002–2006	FC Shinnik Yaroslavl	23	(0)
2007	FC Tekstilshchik-Telekom Ivanovo	20	(0)
2008	FC Sheksna Cherepovets	29	(2)
2009	FC Dynamo Barnaul	25	(3)
2010	FC Akzhayik	16	(0)
2010	FC Sheksna Cherepovets	13	(0)
2011	FC Kooperator Vichuga		

International career
2005	Russia U-21	1	(0)
- * Club domestic league appearances and goals

Viktor Alekseyevich Myagkov (Russian: Виктор Алексеевич Мягков; born 2 February 1985) is a Russian former professional footballer.

== Club career ==
He made his debut in the Russian Premier League in 2005 for FC Shinnik Yaroslavl.
