= Igor Zolotovskiy =

Russian footballer

Personal information
- Full name: Igor Andreyevich Zolotovskiy
- Date of birth: 12 June 1995 (age 31)
- Place of birth: Yaroslavl, Russia
- Height: 1.87 m (6 ft 1 1/2 in)
- Position: Defender

Senior career*
Years	Team	Apps	(Gls)
2012–2015	FC Shinnik-M Yaroslavl		
2014–2016	FC Shinnik Yaroslavl	1	(0)
2016–2017	FC Volga Tver	14	(0)
- * Club domestic league appearances and goals

Igor Andreyevich Zolotovskiy (Russian: Игорь Андреевич Золотовский; born 12 June 1995) is a Russian former football player.

== Career ==
He made his debut in the Russian Football National League for FC Shinnik Yaroslavl on 21 May 2016 in a game against FC Baltika Kaliningrad.
