= Aleksei Klestov =

Russian footballer

Personal information
- Full name: Aleksei Anatolyevich Klestov
- Date of birth: 27 August 1974 (age 52)
- Place of birth: Yaroslavl, Russian SFSR
- Height: 1.80 m (5 ft 11 in)
- Position: Defender

Youth career
- Yaroslavets Yaroslavl

Senior career*
| Years | Team | Apps | (Gls) |
| 1992–1993 | FC Shinnik Yaroslavl | 1 | (0) |
| 1994 | FC Neftyanik Yaroslavl | 25 | (0) |
| 1995–1998 | FC Shinnik Yaroslavl | 55 | (0) |
| 1998 | FC Tyumen | 11 | (0) |
| 1999 | FC Kristall Smolensk | 13 | (0) |
| 1999–2001 | FC Dynamo Stavropol | 57 | (0) |
| 2002–2004 | FC Spartak Lukhovitsy | 72 | (0) |
| 2004–2005 | FC Fankom Mankurovo | | |
| 2008 | FC NKZ-Shinnik Yaroslavl | | |
- * Club domestic league appearances and goals

Aleksei Anatolyevich Klestov (Russian: Алексей Анатольевич Клестов; born 27 August 1974) is a former Russian football player.
