= Rinad Minvaleyev =

Russian academic

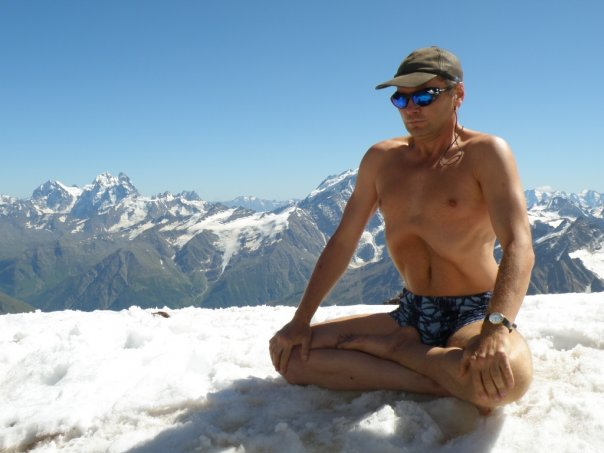
- Born: August 20, 1965 (age 61); Yaroslavl, RSFSR, Soviet Union
- Known for: Researches of the traditional recovery systems
- Scientific career
- Fields: Physiology
- Workplaces: Saint-Petersburg State University

Rinad Sultanovich Minvaleyev (Russian: Рина́д Султа́нович Минвале́ев; born August 20, 1965 in Yaroslavl, Russian SFSR, Soviet Union) is a Russian physiologist, orientalist and researcher of the traditional health cаre systems, candidate of biological sciences, associate professor at the Chair of Physical Education and Sports, Saint-Petersburg State University, provost at the State National Institute of Health, the scientific worker of the A. A. Ukhtomsky Institute of Physiology.

He is an author of row of the scientific researches and publications, the best known of which are "the method of normalization of the human organism’s adaptive functional systems" and the researches of the Tibetan yoga of tummo a.k.a. "the yoga of the inner heat" (in collaboration with Ivanov A. I., candidate of physical and mathematical sciences, research associate at the Institute of Applied Mathematics n. a. Vladimir Zubov (Saint-Petersburg)). He is the scientific chief of yearly expeditions to Himalayas titled "Searching the Lost Knowledge". Rinad Minvaleyev has written the book "To Slim Without a Damage. Feature Articles of the Applied Physiology".

He is a propagandist of the physiologic approach to questions of soul and body recovery. He pays a lot of attention to dethronement of the health care myths.

== Bibliography ==
Scientific publications

Year	Russian Title	English Title
1995	Минвалеев Р. С. Электрическая активность мозга при шавасане // Впервые в медицине, № 1, — СПб.- с. 45.	Electric Activity of Brain in Shavasana — For the first time in medicine, #1, 1995, p. 45, SPb
1996	Минвалеев Р. С., Кузнецов А. А., Ноздрачев А. Д., Лавинский Х. Ю. Особенности наполнения левого желудочка сердца при перевернутых позах человека // Физиология человека, 1996, т. 22, № 6, с. 27-34.	Left Ventricle Filling in Sirshasana and Sarvangasana Yogic Postures - Human Physiology Vol. 22, №6., 1996
1998	Минвалеев Р. С., Кузнецов А. А., Ноздрачев А. Д. Как влияет поза тела на кровоток в паренхиматозных органах? Сообщение I. Печень // Физиология человека, 1998, т. 24, № 4. — с. 101-107.	The Influence of Body Position on the Blood Flow of Parenchymatous Organs: I. Liver - Human Physiology Vol. 24. № 4., 1998
1999	Минвалеев Р. С., Кузнецов А. А., Ноздрачев А. Д. Как влияет поза тела на кровоток в паренхиматозных органах? Сообщение II. Почки // Физиология человека, 1999, т. 25, № 2. — с. 92-98.	The Influence of Body Position on the Blood Flow of Parenchymatous Organs: II. Kidneysа - Human Physiology Vol. 25. №2, 1999
1999	Минвалеев Р. С. Особенности внутрисердечного и внутриорганного кровотока при избранных позах человека (по данным допплерэхографии): Дисс… канд. биол. наук: 03.00.13 / Санкт-Петербургский государственный университет. — СПб., 1999—118 с., ил.	...
2000	Минвалеев Р. С. ПАТЕНТ на изобретение № 2201192 «СПОСОБ НОРМАЛИЗАЦИИ АДАПТИВНЫХ ФУНКЦИОНАЛЬНЫХ СИСТЕМ ОРГАНИЗМА ЧЕЛОВЕКА» от 11.07.2000.	...
2002	Минвалеев Р. С., Иванов А. И., Горбенко П. П. и др. Здоровое питание как элемент психосоматической профилактики наркомании. Отчет о НИР. № госрегистрации РНК 04.000.02.00067. — СПб.: 2002.	...
2002	Минвалеев Р. С., Кирьянова В. В., Иванов А. И. Бхуджангасана изменяет уровень уровень стероидных гормонов у здоровых людей // Адаптивная физическая культура, № 2 (10), 2002. — с. 22-27	Bhujangasana changes the healthy persons’ level of steroid hormones -Adaptive physical culture" magazine, №2 (10), 2002
2003	Минвалеев Р. С., Иванов А. И. К теории управления человеческим организмом. Сообщение 2: Уддияна-бандха // Адаптивная физическая культура, 2003, № 1 (13) — с. 10-11.	For the theory of the human organism management. Article 2: Uddiyana bandha - "Adaptive physical culture" magazine, №2 (10), 2003
2003	Минвалеев Р. С., Иванов А. И. К теории управления человеческим организмом. Сообщение 3: Гарудасана // Адаптивная физическая культура, 2003, № 2 (14) — с. 28-29.	...
2003	Минвалеев Р. С., Иванов А. И. К теории управления человеческим организмом. Сообщение 4: Ваджроли-Мудра // Адаптивная физическая культура, 2003, № 3 (15) — с. 9-10.	...
2004	Минвалеев Р. С., Ноздрачев А. Д., Кирьянова В. В., Иванов А. И. Постуральные влияния на уровень гормонов у здоровых людей. Сообщение I: Поза «кобры» и стероидные гормоны // Физиология человека, 2004, том 30, № 4. — с. 88-92.	...
2006	Иванов А. И., Минвалеев Р. С. Информационный подход к анализу систем: Основы моделирования и первичная обработка данных. Учебное пособие для студентов вузов. Ч.1. СПб филиал ГУ-ВШЭ, 2006. — 99 с.	...
2007	Минвалеев Р. С., Иванов А. И., Савельев Е. В. Новый метод адаптации человека к условиям низких температур. Термодинамический подход // Интеллектуальный форум: Открытая дверь. Материалы научно-творческой встречи. — СПб.: НИИ ПММ, 2007. — с. 200—206.	...
2008	Минвалеев Р. С., Иванов А. И. Модель сатурации при дыхании гипоксической смесью // Спортивна Медицина (Украина), 2008, № 2. — с. 122—124.	...
2008	Минвалеев Р. С. Физика и физиология тибетской йоги туммо // Химия и жизнь XXI век, 2008, № 12, с. 28-34.	...
2009	Минвалеев Р. С., Иванов А. И. К теории управления организмом человека. Сообщение 7: Управляемое снижение в крови уровня кортизола // Спортивна Медицина (Украина), 2009, № 1-2. — с. 125—129.	...
2010	Беркович Ю. А., Демин А. В., Дьяченко А. И., Минвалеев Р. С. Исследование методики повышения холодоустойчивости организма в условиях гипоксии (промежуточный). Отчет НИР. ИМБП РАН, Москва 2010.	...
2011	Минвалеев Р.С. Сравнение скорости изменения липидного профиля сыворотки крови человека при подъеме на высоту среднегорья // Физиология человека, 2011, том 37, №3. - с. 103-108.	...

Books

Year	Russian Title	English Title
2000	Минвалеев Р. Коррекция веса. Теория и практика здорового питания. — СПб: Питер, 2001. — 128 с. — (Исцели себя сам). — 15000 экз. — ISBN 5-318-00148-3	"Weight correction" – Piter, 2001
2003	Минвалеев Р. Похудеть без вреда. Теория и практика здорового питания. — СПб: Питер, 2003. — 128 с. — (Исцели себя сам). — 20000 экз. — ISBN 5-318-00696-5	Minvaleyev R. S., Book «To slim without a damage. Feature articles of the applied physiology" – Piter, 2003

Conferences and congresses

Year	Russian Title	English Title
1997	XXXIII International Congress of Physiological Sciences — Постуральные влияния на внутрисердечный и внутриорганный кровоток при асанах йоги — июнь 30 — июль 5, 1997 — Санкт — Петербург	XXXIII International Congress of Physiological Sciences – Intracardiac and intraorganic blood flow during hatha-yoga practice - June 30 - July 5, 1997 – Saint-Petersburg
1998	Традиционная медицина: теоретические и практические аспекты — Intracardiac and intraorganic blood flow during hatha-yoga practice — 8 — 10 сентября, 1998 — Улан-Уде	Traditional Medicine: theoretical and practical aspects - Intracardiac and intraorganic blood flow during hatha-yoga practice – Sept. 8 – 10, 1998 – Ulan-Ude
1999	Международная научно-практическая конференция «Курорты и оздоровление» — Постуральные влияния на внутрисердечный и внутриорганный кровоток при асанах йоги — 21-22 апреля, 1999 — Санкт-Петербург	International scientific and practical conference "Health-resorts and recovery" - Intracardiac and intraorganic blood flow during hatha-yoga practice – April, 21-22, 1999 – Saint-Petersburg
2002	Вторая научная конференция с международным участием «Эндокринная регуляция физиологических функций в норме и патологии», посвященная 80-летию со дня рождения профессора М. Г. Колпакова — Бхуджангасана изменяет уровень стероидных гормонов сыворотки крови у здоровых людей (стендовая сессия) — 15 — 17 октября, 2002 — Новосибирск	Second scientific conference with an international participation "Endocrine regulation of the physiological functions in comparison of normal and pathological conditions", dedicated to the 80th Jubilee since the birth of prof. M.G. Kolpakov – "Bhujangasana changes the healthy men’s level of steroid hormones" - 15 – 17 октября, 2002 – Novosibirsk
2002	Процессы управления и устойчивость: XXXIII научно-практическая конференция студентов и аспирантов факультета ПМ-ПУ СПбГУ — Модель замедления старения человека — 15-18 апреля 2002 г. — СПб	...
2004	Межрегиональная научно-практическая конференция «Актуальные вопросы физиотерапии, курортологии и восстановительной медицины» — Управляемое снижение уровня липидов сыворотки крови — 5-6 октября 2004 — Санкт-Петербург	...
2004	Межрегиональная научно-практическая конференция «Актуальные вопросы физиотерапии, курортологии и восстановительной медицины» — Ваджроли мудра: физиология пролонгированного полового акта — 5-6 октября 2004 — Санкт-Петербург	...
2005	VIII Международная конференция «Современные технологии восстановительной медицины» — К теории управления человеческим организмом. Сообщение 6: Тибетская йога туммо — 10-15 мая 2005 года — Сочи	...
2006	Всероссийская научно-практическая конференция «105 лет физической культуре и спорту в СПбГУ» — Вегетативный индекс Кердо: математическая модель и ее экспериментальное подтверждение — 01 ноября 2006 года — Санкт-Петербург	...
2007	Тенденции современного образования. Материалы международной научно-практической конференции — К оценке наркоситуации в России — 30 ноября 2007 года — Санкт-Петербург	...
2007	X Международная конференция «Профессиональное долголетие и качество жизни» — К теории управления организмом человека. Сообщение 7: Управляемое снижение атерогенных липидов в условиях высокогорья — 24-26 сентября 2007 — Москва	...
2008	III Троицкая конференция. Медицинская физика и инновации в медицине — Математическая модель термогенной функции легких в условиях низких температур. Термодинамический подход — 3-6 июня 2008 года — Троицк	...
2008	Международная научно-практическая конференция «Буддизм Ваджраяны в России: история и современность» — Тибетская йога туммо: управляемое снижение атерогенных липидов и кортизола в условиях низких температур и высокогорья — 21 октября 2008 года — Санкт-Петербург	...
2010	Вторая международная научно-практическая конференция «Буддизм ваджраяны в России: от контактов к взаимодействию». 16-18 октября 2010 г. «Тибетская йога туммо: сравнение управляемого и неуправляемого снижения общего кортизола у здоровых людей» Минвалеев Р. С., к. б. н., доцент каф. физ. культуры и спорта СПбГУ; Иванов А. И., к. ф.-м. н., науч. сотр. Института прикладной математики им. В. И. Зубова (СПб).	The Second International Academic and Research Conference Vadjrayana Buddhism in Russia: from contact to interaction" - The Tibetan yoga of tummo: comparison of controlled and uncontrolled decrease of general cortisol with healthy persons (in co-operation with Ivanov A.I., Ph.D. Phys. and Math., Research Associate at the Institute of Applied Mathematics n.a. V.I. Zubov (Saint-Petersburg)) - 16–18 October 2010 - Moscow
2010	IX Российская научная конференция с международным участием «Реабилитация и вторичная профилактика в кардиологии» — «Сравнение скорости изменения липидного профиля сыворотки крови человека при подъеме на высоту среднегорья» — 18-19 мая 2011 — Москва.	...

Year	Russian Title	English Title
200x	«Наука и жизнь» — «Как не замёрзнуть нагишом в Гималаях?»	...
2007	Газета «Санкт-Петербургские ведомости», № 106, 14.06.2007 — «Донести огонь до вершины» Archived 2011-07-20 at the Wayback Machine	...
2008	«Россия», «Вести-Петербург», 01.03.2008 — «Как согреться в обжигающие холода»	...
2008	ТК «Россия», «Вести – Спорт», 11.06.2008	...
2008	Газета «Деловой Петербург», 14.11.2008 — «В поисках тепла»	...
2008	Журнал «Химия и жизнь» №12, 2008, «Физика и физиология туммо»	...
2009	«Петербург — 5 канал», «Петербургский час», 14.04.2009 — «Согреться дыханием: чем поможет йога спортсменам-олимпийцам?»	...
2010	ТК «Мир», «Здесь был я», 18.03.2010	...
2010	«Первый Кинофестиваль Короткометражных Фильмов» (Греция) в рамках 8-ой Международной Конференции по Культуре и Туризму «YPERIA 2010». Фильм «Человек-Холод» о Ринаде Минвалееве удостоен специального приза	...
2010	«Петербург - 5 канал», «Ночь на пятом», 29.06.2010	...
2010	ТК «Россия», «Вести-Санкт-Петербург», 10.01.2010	Video at Russia 1, 2010-01-10
2010	Телеканал «Моя планета», «Холод», д. ф., реж. Александр Лютенков	Documentary "Cold", dir. by Alex. Lutenkov

Year	Russian Title	English Title
200x	«Спорт. Бизнес. Маркет» — «В поисках утраченных знаний. Кто практикует Туммо?»	...
200x	Газета «Известия», Наука» — «Как не замёрзнуть нагишом в Гималаях?»	...
2007	«Государственный университет — Высшая школа экономики» — «Эльбрус 2007: российские учёные на пороге новых открытий» Archived 2011-07-27 at the Wayback Machine	...
2007	Журнал «Men's Health», 02.11.2007 - «Голые на Эльбрусе»	...
2007	Комитет по физической культуре и спорту СПб, «Экспедиция на Эльбрус» Archived 2011-07-11 at the Wayback Machine	...
2008	Газета «Петергофский вестник», 28.02.2008 - «Эльбрус, далее – Гималаи»	...
2008	Информационный портал медиасообщества Северо-Западного региона lenizdat.ru. 10.06.2008. Пресс-конференцию по итогам Международной научно-исследовательской экспедиции «Гималаи 2008» в пресс-центре ИТАР-ТАСС.	...
2008	«Итар Тасс», 11.06.2008 — «Авторские методики повышения устойчивости людей к низким температурам ученые-медики Москвы и Петербурга апробировали в Гималаях»	...
2008	«Интерфакс» {Беларусь}, 11.06.2008 — «Петербургские ученые проверят, как долго можно продержаться на Эльбрусе в 20-градусный мороз без одежды»	...
2008	«The St.Petersburg Times», «Scientifists Search for Medical Secrets in Himalayas» Archived 2012-03-29 at the Wayback Machine	...
2009	ТК «РенТВ», 27.03.2009, «Пять историй»	...
2009	ТК «Россия 2», «Вести-спорт», 20.05.2009 — «Вернулась научная экспедиция „Гималаи-2009”»	...
2009	Радио «Балтика», 104.8 FM, 21.05.2009. Эфир с участием организатора экспедиции «Гималаи-2009» Ирины Архиповой и Ринадом Минвалеевым	...
2009	ТК «ОРТ» «Утро», 11. 2009	...
2010	Журнал «Санкт-Петербургский университет», 2010-03-05, «В Гималаи — за здоровьем»	...

Year	Russian Title	English Title
200x	Газета «АиФ» — «Не дай себе засохнуть»	...
200x	Газета «АиФ» — «Русь тибетская. (Действуем на сердце «всеми частями тела»)»	...
200x	Газета «АиФ» — «Поправим нервы, отключив мозги»	...
200x	Газета «АиФ» — «Русь тибетская. (Греемся, «сияя черепом»)»	...
200x	Газета «АиФ» — «Самые вредные диеты: как лучше НЕ худеть»	...
200x	Газета «АиФ» — «Русь тибетская, или Древние рецепты красоты и благополучия»	...
200x	Газета «АиФ» — «Что знал Кощей Бессмертный»	...
200x	Газета «АиФ» — «Как «рассчитать» лекарство»	...
200x	Газета «АиФ» — «Поделиться приехали опытом»	...
200x	Газета «АиФ» — «Новое тело под новой Луной»	...
2007	Газета «Правда» — «Бесхолестериновая диета приводит к раннему климаксу»	...
2008	ТК «ОРТ», «Малахов+», 18.09.2008	...
2008	ТК «ОРТ», «Малахов+», 16.10.2008	...
2008	Газета «Правда», 24.12.2008 — «Высунутый язык лечит больное горло»	...
2010	ТК «Подмосковье», «Специальный репортаж» — «Йога в тумане»	...
2010	ТК «100» (СПб) — «Отражение»	...
