= Viktor Sheinov =

Belarusian psychologist

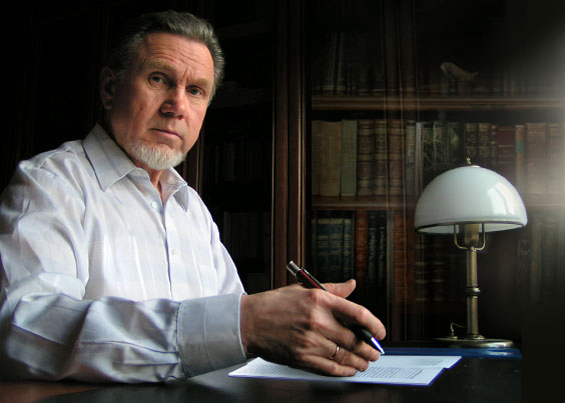
Professor Victor Sheinov

Victor Pavlovich Sheinov (Belarusian: Віктар Паўлавіч Шэйнаў; born May 3, 1940) is Professor of Psychology and Pedagogical Proficiency at the Institute of Higher Education under the auspices of the Belarusian State University (Minsk, Belarus). He is a member of the International Academy of Information Technologies and an author of more than 250 scientific works and over 40 books.

Sheinov's Doctor's degree was honoured for the thesis “Managing Conflicts in Social Environments and Organisations: A Psychological Approach”. His scientific interests are in the field of social psychology.

== Books ==
In total, nine Russian publishing houses (Harvest, Amalfeya, AST, Infra-M, Axis, Prior, Kniga-Service, AlRosa and Kurs) have published over 100 editions of Dr. Sheinov's books and sold over 800,000 copies.

Dr. Sheinov's psychological developments include the technology of the hidden management of people, and techniques of defense against manipulation, as described in his book "Hidden Management of the Person: Manipulation Psychology" (Minsk, Harvest, 2000. – 848 pages). This book was published 22 times, and sold over 200,000 copies.

Other of Dr. Sheinov's psychological discoveries were described in his book "The Art of Managing People" (Minsk, Harvest, 2004. – 512 pages.) The book has been re-issued in Russian 14 times and over 80,000 copies were sold.

Another book by Dr.Sheinov, "How to Manage Others. How to Control Yourself" (Minsk, Amalfeya, 1996. – 368 pages) was awarded the Best Business Book at the Moscow International Book Fair in 1996.

"Psychotechnologies of Influence" (Minsk, Harvest, 2005. – 448 pages) was published in Russian 6 times and over 40,000 copies were sold.

The ideas and methods of psychological influence have been described and systematised by Dr. Sheinov in the outline of the book "Psychological Influence". This book has been translated into English. The ideas in this book are proven to be efficient in various fields of their practical application. This is demonstrated in a number of Dr. Sheinov's publications:

- In the field of relations between men and women, as in "Woman + Man = Knowing and Winning Their Hearts" (Minsk, Harvest, 2000. – 1004 pages). The book was published 14 times, 150,000 copies sold.

- In interpersonal relations and business relations, "The Art of Persuasion" (Moscow, Prior, 1998; 2004; Minsk, Harvest, 2006. – 464 pages.) 11 editions.

- In fraud counteraction, "The Psychology of Deceit and Fraud" (Minsk, Harvest, 2001. – 528 pages) Published in 9 editions.

- In the field of trade and commerce, as in "The Art of Trade: Efficient Sales of Goods and Services" (Minsk, Harvest, 2003. – 416 pages.) Published 6 times.

- In PR, as in book "Black and White PR" (Minsk, Harvest, 2005. – 648 pages.) 4 editions.

- In advertising, as in "Effective Advertising: Secrets of Success" (Moscow, Os, 2003; 2007. – 448 pages.) 2 editions.

- In politics, "The Psychology of Leadership, Influence and Power" (Minsk, Harvest, 2008. – 1004 pages.) 2 editions.

== Biography ==
Victor Sheinov was born May 3, 1940, in Yaroslavl, USSR (now it's Russia). He's got his education in Moscow Pedagogical University (1958-1963). Prof. Sheinov lives with his family in Minsk, Belarus, where he works in the Belarusian State University. He is married with 3 children and 5 grandchildren.

Prof. Sheinov has been working in the following educational institutions:

- Professor of the Psychology and Pedagogic Department, Republican Institute of High School of the Belarusian State University — Minsk, Belarus (1999 – up till present);
- Professor of the Humanitarian Studies Department, Management Institute — Minsk, Belarus (1996-1999);
- Professor of the Management Department, Belarusian Commercial University of Management (1994-1996);
- Director, Owner of “Manager-1” Innovation Enterprise (1990-1994);
- Docent of High Mathematics Department, Belarusian National Technical University (1987-1990);
- Head of Mathematical Modeling Laboratory, Belarusian Scientific Research Institution of Melioration and Water Industry (1972-1987);
- Researcher of Functions Theory Department, Physics Institutions — Krasnoyarsk, Russia (1965-1972);
- Lecturer of High Mathematics Department, Pedagogical Institute — Shuya, Russia (1963-1965).

== Honours and awards ==
- Ph.D., Doctor of Sociology (2000)
- Professor (2003);
- Ph.D., Doctor of Mathematics (1968), docent (1971);
- The book “How to Manage Others. How to Control Yourself” by V.Sheynov was awarded the Business Bestseller prize at the “Moscow Spring 1996” International Book Fair (1996).
