= Nikolai Vovk =

Russian footballer

Personal information
- Full name: Nikolai Aleksandrovich Vovk
- Date of birth: 8 January 1997 (age 29)
- Place of birth: Yaroslavl, Russia
- Height: 1.84 m (6 ft 0 in)
- Positions: Defender; midfielder

Senior career*
Years	Team	Apps	(Gls)
2014–2016	FC Shinnik Yaroslavl	10	(0)
2016	FC Torpedo Vladimir	10	(0)
2017–2018	FC Shinnik Yaroslavl	0	(0)
2017–2018	→ FC Murom (loan)	23	(0)
2018–2019	FC Znamya Truda Orekhovo-Zuyevo	21	(1)
2019–2021	FC Shinnik Yaroslavl	3	(0)
2020–2021	→ FC Znamya Truda Orekhovo-Zuyevo (loan)	21	(0)
2021	FC Znamya Noginsk	14	(0)
- * Club domestic league appearances and goals

Nikolai Aleksandrovich Vovk (Russian: Николай Александрович Вовк; born 8 January 1997) is a Russian former football player.

== Club career ==
He made his debut in the Russian Football National League for FC Shinnik Yaroslavl on 22 March 2015 in a game against FC Luch-Energiya Vladivostok.
