= Leonid Pavlovich Sabaneyev =

Russian zoologist (1844–1898)

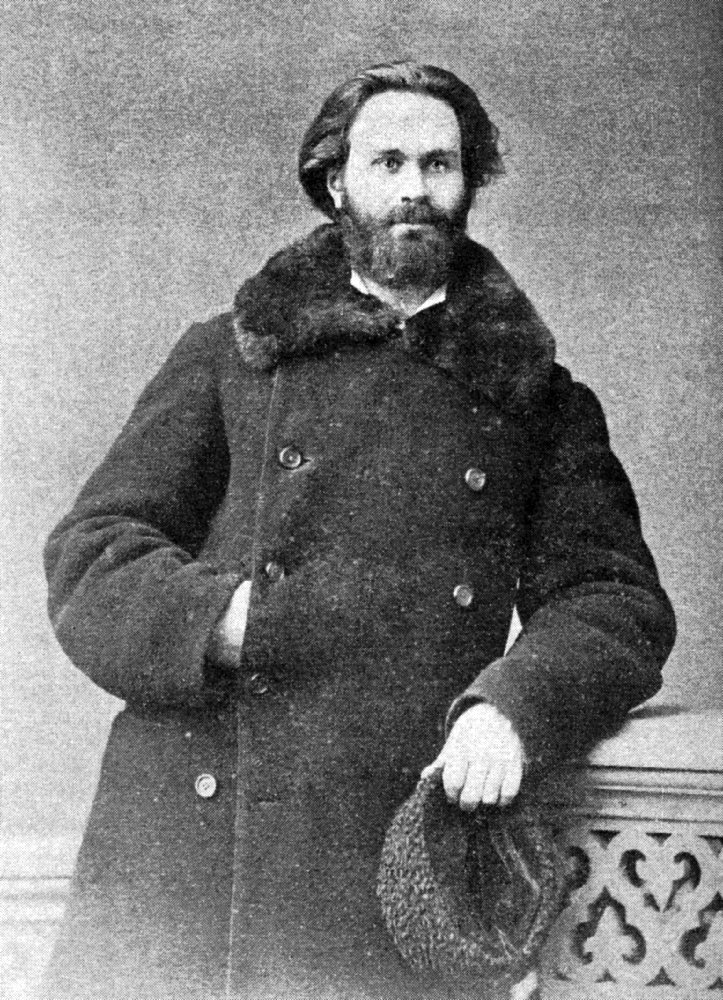
Leonid P. Sabaneyev

Leonid Pavlovich Sabaneyev (Леонид Павлович Сабанеев; 1844–1898) was a Russian zoologist who made extensive contributions to the study of hunting in Russia.

The scion of a noble family from Yaroslavl, Sabaneyev was educated at the Page Corps, Demidov Lyceum, and Moscow University. He was on friendly terms with Grand Duke Alexander Alexandrovich and held the post of Stallmeister (stable master) at his court. His son Leonid (1881–1968) was a noted composer and music critic.

Leonid P. Sabaneyev set up Hunter's Gazette (Охотничья газета) in 1888 and was the author of the enormously popular Hunter's Calendar featuring valuable practical information. His work Freshwater Fishes and Fishing in Russia (1875) is considered a minor classic. His correspondence with Charles Darwin, Ivan Turgenev, and Albert I of Monaco has been published.

It was Sabaneyev who set up an exclusive hunting club in Moscow and conducted the first national survey of hunting.
