= Dmitri Belov (footballer, born 1995) =

Russian football player

Personal information
- Full name: Dmitri Igorevich Belov
- Date of birth: 31 March 1995 (age 31)
- Place of birth: Yaroslavl, Russia
- Height: 1.83 m (6 ft 0 in)
- Position: Forward

Senior career*
Years	Team	Apps	(Gls)
2016–2017	FC Shinnik Yaroslavl	8	(0)
2017	FC Torpedo Vladimir	14	(0)
2018	FC Dynamo-2 Saint Petersburg	2	(0)
2018	FC Akademiya Futbola Rostov-on-Don	2	(0)
2019–2020	FC Znamya Truda Orekhovo-Zuyevo	15	(2)
2021	FC Tuapse	15	(6)
2021	FC Chernomorets Novorossiysk	12	(0)
- * Club domestic league appearances and goals

Dmitri Igorevich Belov (Russian: Дмитрий Игоревич Белов; born 31 March 1995) is a Russian former football player.

== Club career ==
He made his debut in the Russian Football National League for FC Shinnik Yaroslavl on 11 July 2016 in a game against FC Baltika Kaliningrad.
