= FC Neftyanik Yaroslavl =

- Full name: Football Club Neftyanik Yaroslavl
- Founded: 1963
- League: Yaroslavl Open City League
- 2011: 1

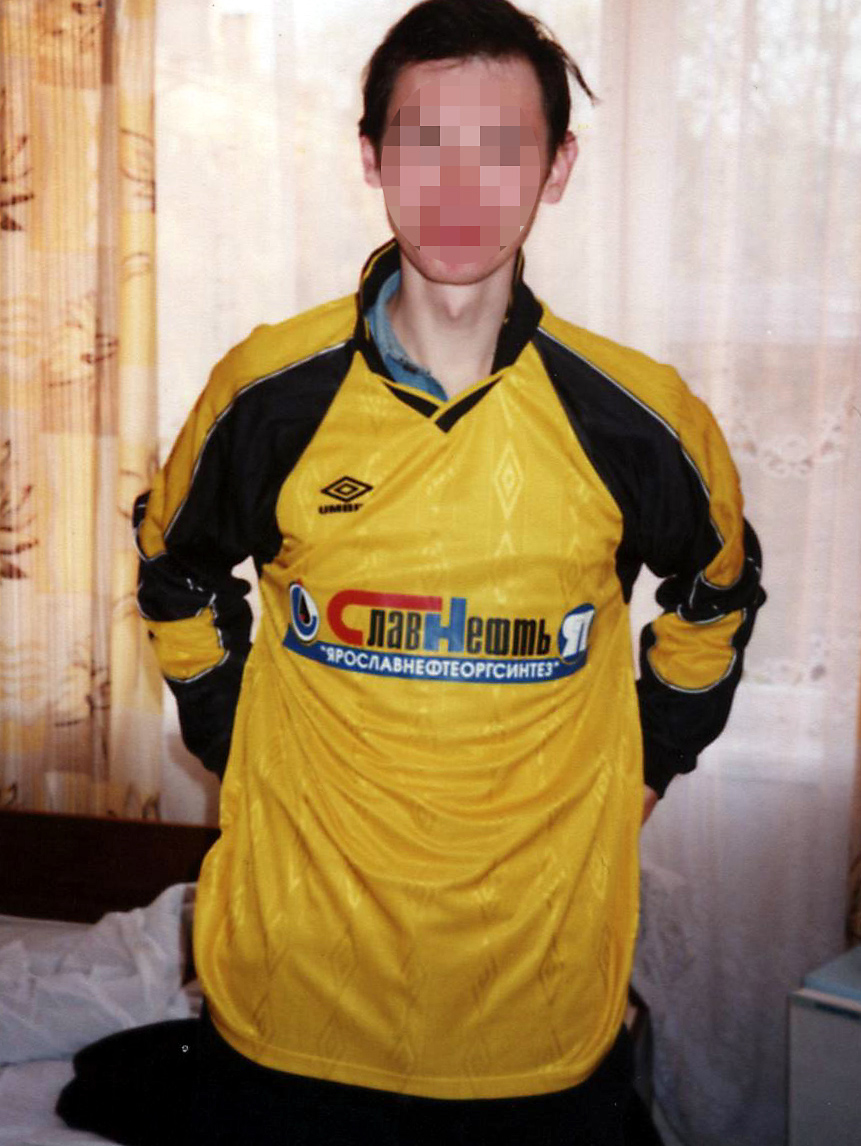
T-shirt of the FC Neftyanik

FC Neftyanik Yaroslavl (FC Yaroslavl Oilers) (Russian: «Нефтяник» (Ярославль)) is a Russian football team from Yaroslavl. Established in 1963 as amateur club. It played professionally from 1994 to 2002. Their best result was 8th place in Zone West of the Russian Second Division in 2000. After 2002 it plays in the Yaroslavl city league. 2007, 2010, 2011, 2013, 2015, 2016, 2017 it was champion of Yaroslavl.
