= 2015–16 Russian Professional Football League =

Russian Professional Football League
- Season: 2015–16
- All statistics correct as of 9 November 2015.

The 2015–16 Professional Football League is the third highest division in Russian football. The Professional Football League is geographically divided into 5 zones. The winners of each zone are automatically promoted into the National Football League. The bottom finishers of each zone lose professional status and are relegated into the Amateur Football League.

== West ==
=== Teams and stadiums ===
Team	Head coach	Captain	Stadium	Capacity
Dnepr Smolensk	(Russia) Vladimir Silovanov	(Russia) Sergei Davydov	SGAFKST, Smolensk	2,000
Dolgoprudny	(Russia) Andrei Meshchaninov		Salyut, Dolgoprudny	5,750
Domodedovo	(Russia) Artyom Gorlov		Avangard, Domodedovo	6,000
Dinamo St. Petersburg	(Russia) Aleksandr Tochilin	(Russia) Evgeny Pesegov	MSA Petrovsky, Saint Petersburg	2,835
Kareliya	(Russia) Denis Zubko		Spartak, Petrozavodsk	14,545
Khimki	(Russia) Vadim Khafizov		Rodina, Khimki	5,080
Kolomna	(Russia) Vladimir Bondarenko	(Russia) Aleksei Voronkov	Avangard, Kolomna	8,000
Pskov-747	(Russia) Igor Vasilyev	(Russia) Igor Surin	Lokomotiv, Pskov	3,010
Solyaris	(Russia) Sergei Shustikov	(Russia) Vyacheslav Danilin	Spartakovets, Moscow	5,100
Strogino	(Russia) Vladimir Shcherbak	(Russia) Danila Polyakov	Yantar, Moscow	2,000
Spartak Kostroma	(Russia) Galimdzhan Khairulin	(Russia) Mikhail Solovei	Urozhai, Kostroma	3,000
Tekstilshchik Ivanovo	(Russia) Ravil Sabitov	(Russia) Andrei Romanov	Tekstilshchik, Ivanovo	9,565
Torpedo-Vladimir	(Russia) Evgeny Durnev	(Russia) Ivan Karatygin	Torpedo, Vladimir	18,000
Volga Tver	(Azerbaijan) Emin Ağayev	(Russia) Sergei Korovushkin	Khimik, Tver	8,331
Znamya Truda	(Russia) Sergei Bondar	(Russia) Mikhail Sorokin	Torpedo, Orekhovo-Zuyevo	1,500

=== Standings ===
Pos	Team	Pld	W	D	L	GF	GA	GD	Pts	Promotion or relegation
1	Khimki (P)	28	21	6	1	53	14	+39	69	Promotion to Russian National Football League
2	Dolgoprudny	28	17	4	7	49	30	+19	55	
3	Solyaris Moscow	28	17	4	7	50	24	+26	55	
4	Tekstilshchik Ivanovo	28	15	8	5	49	23	+26	53	
5	Torpedo Vladimir	28	14	9	5	37	24	+13	51	
6	Spartak Kostroma	28	14	5	9	42	33	+9	47	
7	Dynamo St. Petersburg	28	14	5	9	44	31	+13	47	
8	Pskov-747 Pskov	28	11	5	12	38	38	0	38	
9	Strogino Moscow	28	8	9	11	28	27	+1	33	
10	CRFSO Smolensk	28	7	10	11	26	32	−6	31	
11	Volga Tver	28	7	7	14	26	43	−17	28	
12	Znamya Truda Orekhovo-Zuyevo	28	7	4	17	28	54	−26	25	
13	Domodedovo Moscow	28	5	7	16	30	52	−22	22	
14	Kareliya (R)	28	5	5	18	26	58	−32	20	Relegation to Amateur Football League (Note: Kareliya didn't receive the license for the next season due to lack of financing.)
15	Kolomna	28	2	4	22	20	65	−45	10	

Source: pfl-russia.com
Rules for classification: 1st points; 2nd matches won; 3rd head-to-head (points, matches won, goal difference, goals scored, away goals scored); 4th goal difference; 5th goals scored; 6th away goals scored
(P) Promoted; (R) Relegated

=== Top scorers ===
As of 31 May 2016

Rank	Player	Team	Goals
1	(Russia) Mikhail Markosov	Solyaris	14
2	(Russia) Aleksandr Alekseyev	Pskov-747	13
3	(Russia) Andrey Pochipov	Pskov-747	11
4	(Russia) Sergei Orlov	Tekstilshchik	10
4	(Russia) Maksim Rogov	Dynamo St. Petersburg	10
4	(Russia) Ivan Sergeyev	Strogino	10

== Center ==
=== Teams and stadiums ===
Team	Head coach	Captain	Stadium	Capacity
Arsenal-2 Tula	(Russia) Vasily Rozhnov		DYuSSh Arsenal, Tula	1,500
Avangard Kursk	(Russia) Igor Belyaev	(Russia) Denis Sinyaev	Trudovye Rezervy, Kursk	11,329
Chertanovo	(Russia) Mikhail Semernya	(Russia) Aleksandr Kotov	Yantar, Moscow	2,000
Dynamo-Bryansk	(Russia) Oleg Garin	(Russia) Aleksandr Fomichyov	Dynamo, Bryansk	10,100
Energomash	(Russia) Viktor Navochenko	(Russia) Andrei Kolesnikov	Energomash, Belgorod	11,456
Kaluga	(Russia) Vitaly Safronov	(Russia) Dmitri Baranov	Annenki, Kaluga	3,643
Lokomotiv Liski	(Russia) Igor Pyvin		Tsentralnyi Profsoyuz, Voronezh	31,793
Metallurg Lipetsk	(Russia) Sergei Mashnin		Metallurg, Lipetsk	14,578
Oryol	(Russia) Eduard Dyomin		Tsentralny, Oryol	14,600
Ryazan	(Armenia) Garnik Avalyan	(Russia) Oleg Yeliseyev	Olimpiets, Ryazan	5,880
Tambov	(Russia) Valery Esipov	(Russia) Aleksei Mikhalyov	Spartak, Tambov	6,300
Torpedo Moscow	(Russia) Valery Petrakov	(Russia) Andrei Shiryaev	Spartak Academy, Moscow	2,700
Vityaz Podolsk	(Russia) Sergei Polstyanov	(Russia) Aleksei Khrapov	Trud, Podolsk	11,887
Zenit Penza		(Russia) Denis Belobayev	Pervomaisky, Penza	5,100

=== Standings ===
Pos	Team	Pld	W	D	L	GF	GA	GD	Pts	Promotion or relegation
1	Tambov	26	15	9	2	41	19	+22	54	Promotion to Russian National Football League
2	Energomash Belgorod	26	13	7	6	28	16	+12	46	
3	Ryazan	26	10	10	6	19	15	+4	40	
4	Metallurg Lipetsk	26	9	13	4	26	21	+5	40	
5	Avangard Kursk	26	10	9	7	33	22	+11	39	
6	Lokomotiv Liski	26	9	12	5	27	19	+8	39	Dissolved
7	Zenit Penza	26	10	8	8	25	21	+4	38	
8	Kaluga	26	9	6	11	24	27	−3	33	
9	Dynamo Bryansk	26	8	7	11	22	25	−3	31	
10	Vityaz Podolsk	26	8	7	11	31	32	−1	31	
11	Chertanovo Moscow	26	8	6	12	31	42	−11	30	
12	Torpedo Moscow	26	8	6	12	21	28	−7	30	
13	Oryol	26	5	7	14	9	25	−16	22	
14	Arsenal-2 Tula	26	2	9	15	22	47	−25	15	

Source: pfl-russia.com
Rules for classification: 1st points; 2nd matches won; 3rd head-to-head (points, matches won, goal difference, goals scored, away goals scored); 4th goal difference; 5th goals scored; 6th away goals scored

=== Top scorers ===
As of 30 May 2016

Rank	Player	Team	Goals
1	(Russia) Roman Grigoryan	Tambov	8
1	(Russia) Denis Sinyaev	Avangard Kursk	8
1	(Russia) Elbrus Tandelov	Ryazan	8
4	(Russia) Sergei Anokhin	Kaluga	7
4	(Russia) Nikita Salamatov	Vityaz Podolsk	7

== South ==
=== Teams and stadiums ===
Team	Head coach	Captain	Stadium	Capacity
Afips	(Russia) Nikolai Yuzhanin	(Russia) Evgeny Shamrin	Andrei-Arena, Afipsky	3,000
Alania	(Russia) Zaur Tedeyev	(Russia) German Tuayev	Spartak, Vladikavkaz	30,901
Angusht	(Russia) Gennady Bondaruk		Rashid Aushev, Nazran	3,000
Astrakhan	(Russia) Sergei Gunko		Astrakhan, Astrakhan	3,000
Biolog-Novokubansk	(Russia) Leonid Nazarenko	(Russia) Maksim Farinov	Biolog, Progress	2,300
Druzhba Maykop	(United States) Bibert Kaghado		Respublikansky, Maykop	16,000
Dynamo Stavropol	(Russia) Valery Zazdravnykh	(Russia) Anatoly Baklanov	Dynamo, Stavropol	16,000
Krasnodar-2	(Russia) Igor Shalimov	(Russia) Ilya Zhigulyov	Krasnodar Academy, Krasnodar	1,500
Mashuk-KMV	(Russia) Sergei Trubitsyn		Tsentralny, Pyatigorsk	10,365
MITOS			Yermak, Novocherkassk	2,500
SKA Rostov-na-Donu	(Russia) Mikhail Kupriyanov	(Russia) Vyacheslav Bokov	SKA SKVO, Rostov-on-Don	11,000
Spartak-Nalchik	(Russia) Khasanbi Bidzhiyev	(Russia) Amir Bazhev	Spartak, Nalchik	13,800
Terek-2	(Russia) Magomed Adiyev		Sultan Bilimkhanov, Grozny	10,300
Chernomorets Novorossiysk	(Russia) Eduard Sarkisov	(Russia) Kirill Kochubey	Tsentralny, Novorossiysk	12,500

=== Standings ===
Pos	Team	Pld	W	D	L	GF	GA	GD	Pts	Promotion or relegation
1	Spartak Nalchik	26	19	6	1	43	6	+37	63	Promotion to Russian National Football League
2	Afips Afipsky	26	15	4	7	35	27	+8	49	
3	Krasnodar-2	26	14	6	6	53	26	+27	48	
4	Chernomorets Novorossiysk	26	14	6	6	35	22	+13	48	
5	Angusht Nazran	26	11	8	7	21	17	+4	41	
6	SKA Rostov-on-Don	26	11	5	10	34	24	+10	38	
7	Mashuk-KMV Pyatigorsk	26	10	5	11	26	32	−6	35	
8	Dynamo Stavropol	26	9	8	9	30	30	0	35	
9	Terek-2 Grozny	26	8	7	11	32	31	+1	31	Dissolved
10	Biolog-Novokubansk	26	7	6	13	21	34	−13	27	
11	Alania Vladikavkaz	26	6	7	13	19	37	−18	25	
12	MITOS Novocherkassk	26	6	5	15	30	48	−18	23	Dissolved
13	Astrakhan	26	5	6	15	23	49	−26	21	Dissolved
14	Druzhba Maykop	26	5	5	16	22	44	−22	20	

Source: pfl-russia.com
Rules for classification: 1st points; 2nd matches won; 3rd head-to-head (points, matches won, goal difference, goals scored, away goals scored); 4th goal difference; 5th goals scored; 6th away goals scored

=== Top scorers ===
As of 30 May 2016

Rank	Player	Team	Goals
1	(Russia) Nikolay Komlichenko	Krasnodar-2	24
2	(Russia) Ruslan Aliyev	Mashuk-KMV	13
3	(Russia) Nikolai Boyarintsev	Chernomorets Novorossiysk	12
3	(Russia) Artyom Maslevskiy	Afips Afipsky	12
5	(Russia) Aleksandr Podbeltsev	SKA Rostov-on-Don	10

== Ural-Povolzhye ==
=== Teams and stadiums ===
Team	Head coach	Captain	Stadium	Capacity
Chelyabinsk	(Russia) Igor Lazarev		Tsentralny, Chelyabinsk	15,000
Dynamo Kirov	(Russia) Aleksei Lipatnikov	(Russia) Aleksandr Zakhlestin	Rossiya, Kirov	3,000
Khimik Dzerzhinsk			Khimik, Dzerzhinsk	5,266
Lada-Tolyatti	(Russia) Vladimir Kukhlevsky	(Russia) Aleksei Churavtsev	Torpedo, Tolyatti	18,000
Neftekhimik	(Russia) Rustem Khuzin	(Russia) Sergei Morozov	Neftekhimik, Nizhnekamsk	3,140
Nosta	(Russia) Konstantin Galkin	(Russia) Valery Sorokin	Metallurg, Novotroitsk	6,000
Syzran-2003	(Russia) Dmitri Voyetsky	(Russia) Sergei Simonov	Kristall, Syzran	2,070
Volga Ulyanovsk	(Russia) Sergei Sedyshev	(Russia) Aleksei Storozhuk	Start, Ulyanovsk	4,700
Volga-Olimpiyets	(Moldova) Valery Bogdanets	(Russia) Aleksei Domshinskiy	Severny, Nizhny Novgorod	4,500
Zenit-Izhevsk	(Russia) Igor Menshchikov		Zenit, Izhevsk	18,000

=== Standings ===
Pos	Team	Pld	W	D	L	GF	GA	GD	Pts	Promotion or relegation
1	Neftekhimik Nizhnekamsk	27	18	6	3	56	15	+41	60	Promotion to Russian National Football League
2	Zenit Izhevsk	27	17	3	7	49	25	+24	54	
3	Volga-Olimpiyets	27	15	8	4	38	19	+19	53	
4	Syzran-2003	27	13	7	7	35	29	+6	46	
5	Chelyabinsk	27	13	5	9	41	27	+14	44	
6	Volga Ulyanovsk	27	10	5	12	33	32	+1	35	
7	Nosta Novotroitsk	27	7	7	13	33	41	−8	28	
8	Khimik Dzerzhinsk	27	7	4	16	28	54	−26	25	Dissolved
9	Lada Tolyatti	27	5	7	15	23	56	−33	22	
10	Dynamo Kirov	27	1	6	20	18	56	−38	9	

Source: pfl-russia.com
Rules for classification: 1st points; 2nd matches won; 3rd head-to-head (points, matches won, goal difference, goals scored, away goals scored); 4th goal difference; 5th goals scored; 6th away goals scored

=== Top scorers ===
As of 31 May 2016

Rank	Player	Team	Goals
1	(Russia) Dmitri Otstavnov	Volga Ulyanovsk	16
2	(Russia) Marat Safin	Zenit-Izhevsk	13
3	(Russia) Denis Uryvkov	Chelyabinsk	10
4	(Russia) Maksim Malakhovskiy	Zenit-Izhevsk	9
5	(Russia) Viktor Karpukhin	Nosta	7
5	(Russia) Leonid Reshetnikov	Neftekhimik	7

== East ==
=== Teams and stadiums ===
Team	Head coach	Captain	Stadium	Capacity
Chita	(Russia) Ilya Makienko	(Russia) Artyom Drobyshev	Lokomotiv, Chita	10,200
Dynamo-Barnaul	(Russia) Oleg Yakovlev	(Russia) Bogdan Karyukin	Dynamo, Barnaul	15,000
Irtysh Omsk	(Russia) Sergei Boyko	(Russia) Anton Bagayev	Krasnaya Zvezda, Omsk	4,655
Novokuznetsk			Metallurg, Novokuznetsk	8,000
Sakhalin	(Russia) Aleksandr Alfyorov	(Russia) Murtazi Alakhverdov	Spartak, Yuzhno-Sakhalinsk	4,200
Sibir-2	(Kazakhstan) Dmitri Mamonov		Spartak, Novosibirsk	12,500
Smena	(Russia) Mikhail Semyonov	(Russia) Soslan Takazov	Metallurg, Komsomolsk-na-Amure	3,000
Tom-2	(Russia) Viktor Sebelev	(Russia) Mikhail Bashilov	Temp, Tomsk	3,000
Yakutiya	(Russia) Sergei Shishkin		Tuymaada, Yakutsk	12,500

=== Standings ===
Pos	Team	Pld	W	D	L	GF	GA	GD	Pts	Promotion or relegation
1	Smena Komsomolsk-na-Amure	24	14	7	3	45	25	+20	49	Refused promotion due to lack of financing
2	Sakhalin Yuzhno-Sakhalinsk	24	14	6	4	40	17	+23	48	
3	Chita	24	9	7	8	30	25	+5	34	
4	Dynamo Barnaul	24	7	10	7	33	29	+4	31	
5	Irtysh Omsk	24	7	10	7	25	23	+2	31	
6	Sibir-2 Novosibirsk	23	7	5	11	29	40	−11	26	
7	Tom-2 Tomsk	23	6	7	10	27	35	−8	25	
8	Yakutiya Yakutsk	24	6	7	11	38	49	−11	25	Dissolved
9	Novokuznetsk	24	5	5	14	24	48	−24	20	Relegation to Amateur Football League (Note: FC Novokuznetsk dropped out of the competition in February 2016 after playing 16 games and gaining 20 points. All the remaining games will be awarded to the opponents with the score of 3-0.)

Source: pfl-russia.com
Rules for classification: 1st points; 2nd matches won; 3rd head-to-head (points, matches won, goal difference, goals scored, away goals scored); 4th goal difference; 5th goals scored; 6th away goals scored

=== Top scorers ===
As of 29 May 2016

Rank	Player	Team	Goals
1	(Russia) Vladislav Aksyutenko	Dynamo Barnaul	12
1	(Russia) Aleksandr Gagloyev	Sakhalin	12
3	(Russia) Ibragim Bazayev	Smena	10
4	(Russia) Andrei Razborov	Chita	9
5	(Russia) Almaz Fatikhov	Chita	8
5	(Russia) Aleksei Sabanov	Novokuznetsk	8
5	(Russia) Aleksandr Yashan	Smena	8
