= 2016–17 Russian Professional Football League =

Russian Professional Football League
- Season: 2016–17
- Promoted: Avangard Kursk; Dynamo St. Petersburg; Olimpiyets Nizhny Novgorod; Rotor Volgograd
- Relegated: Dynamo Kirov; Irtysh Omsk; Kuban-2 Krasnodar; Oryol; Volga Tver

The 2016–17 Professional Football League was the third highest division in Russian football. The Professional Football League is geographically divided into 5 zones. The winners of each zone are automatically promoted into the National Football League. The bottom finishers of each zone lose professional status and are relegated into the Amateur Football League.

== West ==
=== Teams and stadia ===
Locations of teams in the 2016–17 Russian Professional Football League (West)

#	Team	Head coach	Stadium	Capacity	Ref
1	CRFSO Smolensk	(Russia) Vladimir Silovanov, (Russia) Sergei Gunko	SGAFKST, Smolensk	2,000	
2	Dynamo St Petersburg	(Russia) Aleksandr Tochilin	MSA Petrovsky, Saint Petersburg	2,835	
3	Dolgoprudny	(Russia) Andrei Meshchaninov	Salyut, Dolgoprudny	5,750	
4	Domodedovo	(Russia) Artyom Gorlov	Avangard, Domodedovo	6,000	
5	Dynamo-2 Moscow	(Russia) Sergei Chikishev	Arena Khimki, Khimki	18,636	
6	Kolomna	(Russia) Aleksandr Bodrov	Avangard, Kolomna	8,000	
7	Pskov-747	(Russia) Igor Vasilyev	Lokomotiv, Pskov	3,010	
8	Solyaris	(Russia) Vladimir Maminov	Spartakovets, Moscow	5,100	
9	Strogino	(Russia) Vladimir Shcherbak	Yantar, Moscow	2,000	
10	Spartak Kostroma	(Russia) Aleksandr Gushchin	Urozhai, Kostroma	3,000	
11	Tekstilshchik Ivanovo	(Russia) Sergei Petrov	Tekstilshchik, Ivanovo	9,565	
12	Torpedo-Vladimir	(Russia) Aleksandr Akimov	Torpedo, Vladimir	18,000	
13	Volga Tver	(Russia) Vladimir Antipov	Khimik, Tver	8,331	
14	Znamya Truda	(Russia) Sergei Bondar	Torpedo, Orekhovo-Zuyevo	1,500	

=== Rules ===
- Format: for the 2016-17 season, the Russian Professional Football League West consists of 14 teams, each team plays the others twice on a home and away basis for a total of 26 games each, over 26 game weeks.
- Points scored: 3 points for a win, 1 point for a draw, 0 points for a loss.
- Rules for classification: 1. Points won; 2. Games won; 3. Points in head-to-head matches; 4. Games won in head-to-head matches; 5. Goal difference in head-to-head matches; 6. Goals scored in head-to-head matches; 7. Away goals in head-to-head matches; 8. Total goal difference; 9. Total goals scored; 10. Total away goals scored.
- Relegation to the Professional Football League from the Football National League: 0-5 teams
- Promotion from the Professional Football League to the Football National League: 1 team (Champion)
- Relegation from the Professional Football League to the Amateur Football League: 1 team (last place)
- Promotion to the Professional Football League from the Amateur Football League: no set number of teams to be promoted
- Promotion and relegation of club second teams:

1. Second teams (Dynamo-2 Moscow) cannot be promoted.
2. If any of them finishes in a promotion spot, then the next best team in the final table is promoted in their place.
3. Second teams are to be relegated regardless of their league position if their first team gets relegated to the Professional Football League.
4. In such case and if the II team is above the relegation zone, the best placed team in the relegation zone keeps its place in Professional Football League instead.

=== Standings ===
Pos	Team	Pld	W	D	L	GF	GA	GD	Pts	Promotion or relegation
1	Dynamo St. Petersburg (C, P)	26	20	4	2	63	19	+44	64	Promotion to Russian National Football League
2	Dolgoprudny	26	16	8	2	53	20	+33	56	
3	Tekstilshchik Ivanovo	26	15	7	4	49	23	+26	52	
4	Dynamo-2 Moscow	26	13	4	9	38	25	+13	43	
5	Spartak Kostroma	26	11	10	5	39	22	+17	43	
6	Solyaris Moscow (R)	26	10	7	9	50	40	+10	37	Relegation to Amateur Football League
7	Torpedo Vladimir	26	9	8	9	30	31	−1	35	
8	Domodedovo Moscow (R)	26	9	6	11	21	32	−11	33	Relegation to Amateur Football League
9	CRFSO Smolensk	26	6	11	9	35	37	−2	29	
10	Pskov-747 Pskov	26	6	10	10	18	31	−13	28	
11	Strogino Moscow	26	5	8	13	18	42	−24	23	
12	Kolomna	26	4	9	13	19	43	−24	21	
13	Znamya Truda Orekhovo-Zuyevo	26	4	4	18	15	47	−32	16	
14	Volga Tver (R)	26	4	4	18	14	50	−36	16	Relegation to Amateur Football League

Rules for classification: 1. points won; 2. games won; 3. points in head-to-head matches; 4. games won in head-to-head matches; 5. goal difference in head-to-head matches; 6. goals scored in head-to-head matches; 7. away goals in head-to-head matches; 8. total goal difference; 9. total goals scored; 10. total away goals scored.
(C) Champions; (P) Promoted; (R) Relegated

=== Top scorers ===
As of 4 June 2017

Rank	Player	Team	Goals
1	(Russia) Maksim Barsov	Solyaris	15
1	(Russia) Mikhail Markosov	Dynamo St Petersburg	15
3	(Russia) Artyom Kulishev	Dynamo St Petersburg	12
4	(Russia) Nikolay Obolsky	Dynamo-2 Moscow	10
4	(Russia) Aleksey Rogov	Dolgoprudny	10
4	(Russia) Maksim Rogov	Dynamo St Petersburg	10

== Center ==
=== Teams and stadia ===
Locations of teams in the 2016–17 Russian Professional Football League (Center)

#	Team	Head coach	Stadium	Capacity	Ref
1	Arsenal-2 Tula	(Russia) Yuri Cheryevskiy	DYuSSh Arsenal, Tula	1,500	
2	Avangard Kursk	(Russia) Igor Belyaev	Trudovye Rezervy, Kursk	11,329	
3	Chertanovo	(Russia) Igor Osinkin	Yantar, Moscow	2,000	
4	Dynamo-Bryansk	(Russia) Yuri Bykov	Dynamo, Bryansk	10,100	
5	Energomash	(Russia) Viktor Navochenko	Energomash, Belgorod	11,456	
6	Kaluga	(Russia) Vitaly Safronov	Annenki, Kaluga	3,643	
7	Metallurg Lipetsk	(Russia) Sergei Mashnin	Metallurg, Lipetsk	14,578	
8	Oryol	(Russia) Anatoli Shelest	Tsentralny, Oryol	14,600	
9	Ryazan	(Armenia) Garnik Avalyan	Olimpiets, Ryazan	5,880	
10	Saturn Ramenskoye	(Russia) Dmitri Seryozhkin	Saturn, Ramenskoye	14,685	
11	Torpedo Moscow	(Russia) Viktor Bulatov	Spartak Academy, Moscow	2,700	
12	Vityaz Podolsk	(Russia) Andrei Romanov; Sergei Polstyanov	Trud, Podolsk	11,887	
13	Zenit Penza	(Russia) Mikhail Solovyov	Pervomaisky, Penza	5,100	

=== Rules ===
- Format: for the 2016-17 season, the Russian Professional Football League West consists of 13 teams, each team plays the others twice on a home and away basis for a total of 24 games each, over 26 game weeks.
- Points scored: 3 points for a win, 1 point for a draw, 0 points for a loss.
- Rules for classification: 1. Points won; 2. Games won; 3. Points in head-to-head matches; 4. Games won in head-to-head matches; 5. Goal difference in head-to-head matches; 6. Goals scored in head-to-head matches; 7. Away goals in head-to-head matches; 8. Total goal difference; 9. Total goals scored; 10. Total away goals scored.
- Relegation to the Professional Football League from the Football National League: 0-5 teams
- Promotion from the Professional Football League to the Football National League: 1 team (Champion)
- Relegation from the Professional Football League to the Amateur Football League: 1 team (last place)
- Promotion to the Professional Football League from the Amateur Football League: no set number of teams to be promoted
- Promotion and relegation of club second teams:

1. Second teams (Arsenal-2 Tula) cannot be promoted.
2. If any of them finishes in a promotion spot, then the next best team in the final table is promoted in their place.
3. Second teams are to be relegated regardless of their league position if their first team gets relegated to the Professional Football League.
4. In such case and if the II team is above the relegation zone, the best placed team in the relegation zone keeps its place in Professional Football League instead.

=== Standings ===
Pos	Team	Pld	W	D	L	GF	GA	GD	Pts	Promotion or relegation
1	Avangard Kursk (C, P)	24	13	6	5	28	16	+12	45	Promotion to Russian National Football League
2	Saturn Ramenskoye	24	11	9	4	32	20	+12	42	
3	Torpedo Moscow	24	11	9	4	36	19	+17	42	
4	Energomash Belgorod	24	12	5	7	47	24	+23	41	
5	Vityaz Podolsk (R)	24	12	4	8	43	35	+8	40	Relegation to Amateur Football League
6	Chertanovo Moscow	24	9	7	8	36	33	+3	34	
7	Metallurg Lipetsk	24	8	7	9	27	29	−2	31	
8	Ryazan	24	7	10	7	29	25	+4	31	
9	Dynamo Bryansk	24	8	6	10	22	19	+3	30	
10	Kaluga	24	8	6	10	25	28	−3	30	
11	Zenit Penza	24	7	6	11	31	43	−12	27	
12	Arsenal-2 Tula (R)	24	4	5	15	24	52	−28	17	Relegation to Amateur Football League
13	Oryol (R)	24	3	6	15	13	50	−37	15	Relegation to Amateur Football League

Rules for classification: 1. points won; 2. games won; 3. points in head-to-head matches; 4. games won in head-to-head matches; 5. goal difference in head-to-head matches; 6. goals scored in head-to-head matches; 7. away goals in head-to-head matches; 8. total goal difference; 9. total goals scored; 10. total away goals scored.
(C) Champions; (P) Promoted; (R) Relegated

=== Top scorers ===
As of 28 May 2017

Rank	Player	Team	Goals
1	(Russia) Nikolai Prudnikov	Chertanovo Moscow	12
2	(Russia) Aleksandr Podymov	Vityaz Podolsk	9
3	(Russia) Mikhail Markin	Zenit Penza	8
3	(Russia) Dmitri Samoilov	Energomash Belgorod	8
3	(Russia) Viktor Sergeyev	Energomash Belgorod	8
3	(Russia) Aleksandr Yuryev	Vityaz Podolsk	8

== South ==
=== Teams and stadia ===
Locations of teams in the 2016–17 Russian Professional Football League (South)

#	Team	Head coach	Stadium	Capacity	Ref
1	Afips	(Russia) Dmitry Petrenko	Andrei-Arena, Afipsky	3,000	
2	Angusht Nazran	(Russia) Valeri Zazdravnykh	Rashid Aushev, Nazran	3,000	
3	Armavir	(Russia) Arsen Papikyan	Yunost, Armavir	5,000	
4	Biolog-Novokubansk	(Russia) Leonid Nazarenko	Biolog, Progress	2,300	
5	Chayka Peschanokopskoye	(Russia) Albert Borzenkov	I.P. Chayka, Peschanokopskoye	1,915	
6	Chernomorets Novorossiysk	(Russia) Eduard Sarkisov	Tsentralny, Novorossiysk	12,500	
7	Druzhba Maykop	(Russia) Aleksandr Deriberin	Respublikansky, Maykop	16,000	
8	Dynamo Stavropol	(Russia) Andrei Mulikov	Dynamo, Stavropol	16,000	
9	Krasnodar-2	(Russia) Dmitry Kudinov	Krasnodar Academy, Krasnodar	1,500	
10	Kuban-2 Krasnodar	(Russia) Andriy Yudin; Yevgeny Kaleshin	Trud, Krasnodar	31,798	
11	Legion-Dynamo Makhachkala	(Russia) Muslim Daliyev	Dinamo, Makhachkala	12,100	
12	Mashuk-KMV	(Russia) Zurab Sanaya	Tsentralny, Pyatigorsk	10,365	
13	Rotor Volgograd	(Russia) Lev Ivanov	Zenit, Volgograd	3,470	
14	SKA Rostov-on-Don	(Russia) Mikhail Kupriyanov	Lokomotiv, Rostov-on-Don	3,000	
15	Sochi	(Russia) Khazret Dyshekov; Gennady Bondaruk	Sochi Central, Sochi	10,200	
16	Spartak Vladikavkaz	(Russia) Marat Dzoblayev	Spartak, Vladikavkaz	30,901	

=== Rules ===
- Format: for the 2016-17 season, the Russian Professional Football League South consists of 16 teams, each team plays the others twice on a home and away basis for a total of 30 games each, over 30 game weeks.
- Points scored: 3 points for a win, 1 point for a draw, 0 points for a loss.
- Rules for classification: 1. Points won; 2. Games won; 3. Points in head-to-head matches; 4. Games won in head-to-head matches; 5. Goal difference in head-to-head matches; 6. Goals scored in head-to-head matches; 7. Away goals in head-to-head matches; 8. Total goal difference; 9. Total goals scored; 10. Total away goals scored.
- Relegation to the Professional Football League from the Football National League: 0-5 teams
- Promotion from the Professional Football League to the Football National League: 1 team (Champion)
- Relegation from the Professional Football League to the Amateur Football League: 1 team (last place)
- Promotion to the Professional Football League from the Amateur Football League: no set number of teams to be promoted
- Promotion and relegation of club second teams:

1. Second teams (Krasnodar-2 and Kuban-2) cannot be promoted.
2. If any of them finishes in a promotion spot, then the next best team in the final table is promoted in their place.
3. Second teams are to be relegated regardless of their league position if their first team gets relegated to the Professional Football League.
4. In such case and if the II team is above the relegation zone, the best placed team in the relegation zone keeps its place in Professional Football League instead.

=== Standings ===
Pos	Team	Pld	W	D	L	GF	GA	GD	Pts	Promotion or relegation
1	Rotor Volgograd (C, P)	30	21	4	5	66	24	+42	67	Promotion to Russian National Football League
2	Afips Afipsky	30	19	5	6	42	24	+18	62	
3	Armavir	30	18	8	4	44	18	+26	62	
4	Chayka Peschanokopskoye	30	14	10	6	44	25	+19	52	
5	Chernomorets Novorossiysk	30	15	5	10	37	21	+16	50	
6	Krasnodar-2	30	15	5	10	47	28	+19	50	
7	Sochi	30	13	9	8	44	32	+12	48	
8	SKA Rostov-on-Don	30	10	10	10	31	33	−2	40	
9	Druzhba Maykop	30	11	5	14	36	45	−9	38	
10	Spartak Vladikavkaz	30	10	7	13	26	36	−10	37	
11	Biolog-Novokubansk	30	10	4	16	26	44	−18	34	
12	Dynamo Stavropol	30	8	5	17	23	42	−19	29	
13	Angusht Nazran	30	6	9	15	18	32	−14	27	
14	Mashuk-KMV Pyatigorsk	30	7	5	18	30	54	−24	26	
15	Legion-Dynamo Makhachkala	30	6	6	18	22	52	−30	24	
16	Kuban-2 Krasnodar	30	6	5	19	22	48	−26	23	

Rules for classification: 1. points won; 2. games won; 3. points in head-to-head matches; 4. games won in head-to-head matches; 5. goal difference in head-to-head matches; 6. goals scored in head-to-head matches; 7. away goals in head-to-head matches; 8. total goal difference; 9. total goals scored; 10. total away goals scored.
(C) Champions; (P) Promoted

=== Top scorers ===
As of 4 June 2017

Rank	Player	Team	Goals
1	(Russia) Alexei Zhdanov	Rotor Volgograd	23
2	(Russia) Marat Safin	Sochi	16
3	(Georgia (country)) Artur Grigoryan	Chernomorets	10
3	(Russia) Sergei Sechin	Rotor Volgograd	10
5	(Russia) Sergei Miroshnichenko	Armavir	9
5	(Russia) Maxim Obozny	Chayka	9

== Ural-Povolzhye ==
=== Teams and stadia ===
Locations of teams in the 2016–17 Russian Professional Football League (Center)

#	Team	Head coach	Stadium	Capacity	Ref
1	Chelyabinsk	(Uzbekistan) Ruslan Uzakov	Central Stadium, Chelyabinsk	14,400	
2	Dynamo Kirov	(Russia) Konstantin Olenev	Russia Stadium, Kirov	3,000	
3	KAMAZ Naberezhnye Chelny	(Russia) Vladimir Klontsak	KAMAZ Stadium, Naberezhnye Chelny	6,200	
4	Lada-Togliatti	(Russia) Rustem Khuzin	Torpedo, Tolyatti	16,311	
5	Nosta Novotroitsk	(Russia) Mikhail Belov	Metallurg, Novotroitsk	6,000	
6	Olimpiyets Nizhny Novgorod	(Russia) Nikolai Pisarev	Lokomotiv, Nizhny Novgorod	17,800	
7	Syzran-2003	(Russia) Dmitri Voyetskiy	Kristall, Syzran	2,070	
8	Volga Ulyanovsk	(Russia) Sergei Sedyshev	Start, Ulyanovsk	4,320	
9	Zenit-Izhevsk	(Russia) Igor Menshchikov	Central Stadium, Izhevsk	18,000	

=== Standings ===
Pos	Team	Pld	W	D	L	GF	GA	GD	Pts	Promotion or relegation
1	Olimpiyets Nizhny Novgorod (C, P)	24	17	4	3	47	17	+30	55	Promotion to Russian National Football League
2	Zenit-Izhevsk	24	15	6	3	47	18	+29	51	
3	Chelyabinsk	24	12	3	9	37	21	+16	39	
4	Syzran-2003	24	10	5	9	21	21	0	35	
5	Nosta Novotroitsk	24	10	3	11	31	39	−8	33	
6	Volga Ulyanovsk	24	8	7	9	23	25	−2	31	
7	KAMAZ Naberezhnye Chelny	24	8	5	11	23	25	−2	29	
8	Lada-Togliatti	24	5	6	13	15	41	−26	21	
9	Dynamo Kirov (R)	24	2	3	19	15	52	−37	9	Relegation to Amateur Football League

Rules for classification: 1. points won; 2. games won; 3. points in head-to-head matches; 4. games won in head-to-head matches; 5. goal difference in head-to-head matches; 6. goals scored in head-to-head matches; 7. away goals in head-to-head matches; 8. total goal difference; 9. total goals scored; 10. total away goals scored.
(C) Champions; (P) Promoted; (R) Relegated

=== Top scorers ===
As of 4 June 2017

Rank	Player	Team	Goals
1	(Russia) Igor Gorbunov	Olimpiyets	10
1	(Russia) Marat Shaymordanov	Chelyabinsk	10
3	(Russia) Viktor Karpukhin	Nosta	9
4	(Russia) Igor Belyakov	Olimpiyets	7
4	(Russia) Aleksei Sazonov	Chelyabinsk	7
4	(Russia) Pavel Shadrin	Zenit-Izhevsk	7
4	(Russia) Vladimir Yatsuk	Zenit-Izhevsk	7

== East ==
=== Teams and stadia ===
Locations of teams in the 2016–17 Russian Professional Football League (East)

Team	Head coach	Captain	Stadium	Capacity
Chita	(Russia) Ilya Makienko	(Russia) Artyom Drobyshev	Lokomotiv, Chita	10,200
Dynamo-Barnaul	(Russia) Oleg Yakovlev	(Russia) Bogdan Karyukin	Dynamo, Barnaul	15,000
Irtysh Omsk	(Russia) Sergei Boyko	(Russia) Anton Bagayev	Krasnaya Zvezda, Omsk	4,655
Sakhalin	(Russia) Aleksandr Alfyorov	(Russia) Murtazi Alakhverdov	Spartak, Yuzhno-Sakhalinsk	4,200
Smena	(Russia) Mikhail Semyonov	(Russia) Soslan Takazov	Metallurg, Komsomolsk-na-Amure	3,000
Zenit Irkutsk	(Russia) Sergei Shishkin		Tuymaada, Yakutsk	12,500

=== Rules ===
- Format: for the 2016-17 season, the Russian Professional Football League East consists of 6 teams, each team plays the others 4 times on a 2 at home and 2 away basis for a total of 20 games each, over 20 game weeks.
- Points scored: 3 points for a win, 1 point for a draw, 0 points for a loss.
- Rules for classification: 1. Points won; 2. Games won; 3. Points in head-to-head matches; 4. Games won in head-to-head matches; 5. Goal difference in head-to-head matches; 6. Goals scored in head-to-head matches; 7. Away goals in head-to-head matches; 8. Total goal difference; 9. Total goals scored; 10. Total away goals scored.
- Relegation to the Professional Football League from the Football National League: 0-5 teams
- Promotion from the Professional Football League to the Football National League: 1 team (Champion)
- Relegation from the Professional Football League to the Amateur Football League: 1 team (last place)
- Promotion to the Professional Football League from the Amateur Football League: no set number of teams to be promoted

=== Standings ===
Pos	Team	Pld	W	D	L	GF	GA	GD	Pts	Qualification
1	Chita (C)	20	15	1	4	36	14	+22	46	Refused promotion to Russian National Football League
2	Dynamo Barnaul	20	12	2	6	28	26	+2	38	
3	Sakhalin Yuzhno-Sakhalinsk	20	8	6	6	30	21	+9	30	
4	Smena Komsomolsk-na-Amure	20	7	4	9	25	26	−1	25	
5	Zenit Irkutsk	20	4	4	12	20	34	−14	16	
6	Irtysh Omsk	20	4	3	13	18	36	−18	15	

Rules for classification: 1. points won; 2. games won; 3. points in head-to-head matches; 4. games won in head-to-head matches; 5. goal difference in head-to-head matches; 6. goals scored in head-to-head matches; 7. away goals in head-to-head matches; 8. total goal difference; 9. total goals scored; 10. total away goals scored.
(C) Champions

=== Top scorers ===
As of 4 June 2017

Rank	Player	Team	Goals
1	(Russia) Sergei Narylkov	Chita	9
2	(Russia) Vladimir Zavyalov	Dynamo Barnaul	8
3	(Russia) Ibragim Bazayev	Smena	7
3	(Russia) Almaz Fatikhov	Chita	7
5	(Russia) Vadim Larionov	Irtysh Omsk	6
5	(Russia) Viktor Lipin	Dynamo Barnaul	6
5	(Russia) Roman Tuzovskiy	Dynamo Barnaul	6
