= 2017–18 Russian Football National League =

Russian Football National League

Russian National Football League
- Season: 2017–18
- Champions: Orenburg
- Promoted: Orenburg; Krylia Sovetov; Yenisey
- Relegated: Volgar Astrakhan
- All statistics correct as of 3 August 2017.

The 2017–18 Russian National Football League was the 26th season of Russia's second-tier football league since the dissolution of the Soviet Union. The season began on 8 July 2017 and ended on 12 May 2018.

== Teams ==
Team locations

=== Stadiums, personnel and sponsorship ===
Team	Head coach	Captain	Kitmaker	Sponsor	Stadium	Capacity
Avangard	(Russia) Igor Belyayev	(Russia) Denis Sinyayev	Adidas		Trudovye Rezervy, Kursk	11,329
Baltika	(Tajikistan) Igor Cherevchenko	(Russia) Aleksandr Sheshukov	Jako	Sodruzhestvo	Kaliningrad Stadium, Kaliningrad	35,212
Dynamo	(Russia) Aleksandr Tochilin	(Russia) Yevgeni Pesegov	Nike		MSA Petrovskiy, Saint Petersburg	2,809
Fakel	(Russia) Pavel Gusev		Adidas	TNS Energo	Tsentralnyi Profsoyuz, Voronezh	32,750
Khimki	(Russia) Aleksandr Irkhin		Macron	-	Rodina Stadium, Khimki	5,083
Krylia Sovetov	(Russia) Andrey Tikhonov	(Russia) Ivan Taranov	Nike		Cosmos Arena, Samara	44,918
Kuban	(Russia) Yevgeni Kaleshin	(Russia) Sergei Bendz	Adidas	-	Kuban Stadium, Krasnodar	35,200
Luch-Energiya	(Russia) Aleksandr Grigoryan		Nike	-	Dynamo, Vladivostok	10,200
Olimpiyets	(Russia) Nikolai Pisarev	(Russia) Andrei Khripkov	Jako		Nizhny Novgorod Stadium, Nizhny Novgorod	44,899
Orenburg	(Russia) Vladimir Fedotov	(Russia) Dmitri Andreyev	Nike		Gazovik Stadium, Orenburg	7,500
Rotor	(Russia) Sergei Pavlov	(Russia) Roman Kontsedalov	Adidas		Volgograd Arena, Volgograd	45,568
Shinnik	(Russia) Aleksandr Pobegalov	(Russia) Eldar Nizamutdinov	Jako	-	Shinnik, Yaroslavl	22,990
Sibir	(Russia) Sergei Kirsanov	(Moldova) Eugeniu Cebotaru	Joma	-	Spartak, Novosibirsk	12,500
Spartak-2	(Russia) Dmitri Gunko	(Russia) Artyom Samsonov	Nike	Lukoil	Spartak Academy, Moscow	2,700
Tambov	(Russia) Andrei Talalayev	(Russia) Aleksei Rybin	Jako	TBS	Spartak Stadium, Tambov	5,000
Tom	(Russia) Vasili Baskakov	(Russia) Dmitri Sasin	Joma		Trud Stadium, Tomsk	10,028
Tyumen	(Russia) Vladimir Maminov		Jako	Sibur	Geolog, Tyumen	13,057
Volgar	(Russia) Yuri Gazzayev	(Russia) Stanislav Buchnev	Adidas	Gazprom	Tsentralny, Astrakhan	17,712
Yenisey	(Russia) Dmitri Alenichev	(Russia) Aleksandr Kharitonov	Nike	-	Tsentralny, Krasnoyarsk	22,500
Zenit-2	(Russia) Konstantin Zyryanov	(Russia) Yegor Baburin	Nike	Gazprom	MSA Petrovsky, Saint Petersburg	2,809

== League table ==
Pos	Team	Pld	W	D	L	GF	GA	GD	Pts	Promotion, qualification or relegation
1	Orenburg (C, P)	38	26	6	6	59	26	+33	84	Promotion to Premier League
2	Krylia Sovetov Samara (P)	38	26	4	8	60	23	+37	82	Promotion to Premier League
3	Yenisey Krasnoyarsk (O, P)	38	25	6	7	68	32	+36	81	Qualification to Premier League play-offs
4	Tambov	38	20	8	10	57	36	+21	68	Qualification to Premier League play-offs
5	Baltika Kaliningrad	38	19	7	12	44	35	+9	64	
6	Dynamo Saint Petersburg	38	13	16	9	52	47	+5	55	
7	Sibir Novosibirsk	38	14	11	13	38	31	+7	53	
8	Shinnik Yaroslavl	38	14	11	13	45	45	0	53	
9	Kuban Krasnodar (Note: On 30 May 2018, the league announced that FC Kuban Krasnodar (9th place), FC Tosno (relegated from the 2017–18 Russian Premier League) and FC Ararat Moscow (promoted from the 2017–18 Russian Professional Football League, zone Center) failed in their appeal to get the FNL license for the 2018–19 season. According to league regulation, 18th, 19th and 20th-placed teams will not be relegated.) (D)	38	12	13	13	47	47	0	49	Dissolved after the season
10	Volgar Astrakhan (Note: On 28 May 2018, the league announced that FC Volgar Astrakhan chose to get relegated voluntarily due to lack of financial opportunities. According to league regulations, Rotor Volgograd will not be relegated.) (R)	38	12	9	17	40	46	−6	45	Relegation to Professional Football League
11	Avangard Kursk	38	10	15	13	43	46	−3	45	
12	Olimpiyets Nizhny Novgorod	38	11	11	16	37	50	−13	44	
13	Khimki	38	12	7	19	33	49	−16	43	
14	Spartak-2 Moscow	38	11	9	18	47	64	−17	42	Ineligible for promotion
15	Tom Tomsk	38	10	11	17	36	56	−20	41	
16	Zenit-2 Saint Petersburg (Note: Russian Football Union announced on 11 May 2018, that none of the teams from the East zone of the 2017–18 Russian Professional Football League applied for the FNL license for the 2018–19 season. According to the league regulations, 16th-placed team will not be relegated.)	38	11	7	20	43	59	−16	40	Ineligible for promotion
17	Rotor Volgograd	38	10	10	18	38	45	−7	40	
18	Luch-Energiya Vladivostok	38	9	13	16	40	52	−12	40	
19	Tyumen	38	9	12	17	41	54	−13	39	
20	Fakel Voronezh	38	9	8	21	27	52	−25	35	

Source: Football National League (Russian), Soccerway
Rules for classification: 1) Points; 2) Matches won; 3) Head-to-head points; 4) Head-to-head matches won; 5) Head-to-head goal difference; 6) Head-to-head goals scored; 7) Head-to-head away goals; 8) Goal difference; 9) Goals scored; 10) Away goals scored.
(C) Champions; (D) Dissolved after the season; (O) Play-off winners; (P) Promoted; (R) Relegated

== Results ==
Home \ Away	AVA	BAL	DSP	FAK	KHI	KRY	KUB	LUE	ONN	ORE	ROT	SHI	SIB	SP2	TAM	TOM	TYU	VOL	YEN	ZE2
Avangard Kursk		1–1	0–0	2–0	0–0	2–4	0–1	1–2	2–3	0–2	0–0	1–2	0–0	1–1	2–1	3–3	0–0	1–0	0–4	1–1
Baltika Kaliningrad	1–0		3–2	0–1	0–0	1–0	5–1	2–1	0–0	0–1	1–0	0–0	0–0	6–0	3–0	2–1	3–1	2–1	0–5	0–1
Dynamo St. Petersburg	1–2	3–1		2–0	2–1	1–3	2–2	3–2	3–1	0–1	0–3	0–0	1–1	2–2	1–1	2–0	2–0	2–2	2–1	3–3
Fakel Voronezh	0–4	0–1	0–0		0–1	1–0	0–2	3–1	4–1	0–1	2–0	2–2	0–1	0–3	1–2	0–1	1–0	2–1	1–3	0–1
Khimki	1–1	1–0	0–1	1–3		0–2	2–1	2–0	0–2	0–1	3–0	0–3	0–1	1–0	1–1	3–1	1–0	0–1	2–1	1–1
Krylia Sovetov Samara	1–0	3–0	2–0	2–1	2–0		1–0	2–0	1–0	0–0	1–1	3–3	3–0	5–1	1–0	0–1	2–0	1–0	1–0	1–0
Kuban Krasnodar	0–3	0–1	0–1	2–2	0–1	2–1		0–0	0–0	4–1	2–1	1–0	1–0	2–3	0–0	3–3	3–1	1–1	1–1	1–0
Luch-Energiya Vladivostok	2–2	0–0	1–2	0–0	1–1	2–0	2–2		1–2	1–0	1–1	3–1	0–2	1–1	0–0	3–0	4–2	0–0	0–1	1–1
Olimpiyets Nizhny Novgorod	2–2	1–2	2–2	2–1	1–0	0–0	0–3	1–0		0–1	1–0	0–1	1–1	1–3	1–1	0–0	1–2	2–1	0–2	0–1
Orenburg	1–1	0–1	4–3	5–0	5–2	3–2	1–0	2–0	3–0		2–2	1–0	1–0	2–1	2–1	3–0	3–0	3–0	1–0	1–0
Rotor Volgograd	1–1	0–1	0–0	0–0	3–1	0–2	2–1	2–0	1–2	0–2		1–1	1–2	1–0	1–0	2–0	1–2	1–2	1–0	4–1
Shinnik Yaroslavl	1–0	1–0	1–2	0–1	2–0	2–3	0–0	1–1	1–2	0–0	3–1		0–1	1–0	1–0	3–3	2–0	1–1	2–2	2–1
Sibir Novosibirsk	0–2	3–0	1–1	4–0	2–0	0–1	2–0	2–0	1–1	0–1	1–0	3–0		1–2	0–1	1–0	0–2	1–1	0–1	3–1
Spartak-2 Moscow	0–1	0–2	2–2	0–0	0–1	0–3	0–0	1–3	2–2	1–0	2–2	1–2	2–1		0–3	2–1	3–1	2–3	1–2	3–1
Tambov	0–1	2–1	1–1	1–0	2–0	0–2	2–1	2–1	2–1	1–1	2–1	3–1	4–1	3–0		3–1	3–1	3–1	5–0	3–1
Tom Tomsk	2–1	1–0	1–0	1–0	2–1	1–0	1–4	0–0	1–2	0–0	1–0	1–3	1–1	1–2	0–0		0–0	2–1	1–1	1–2
Tyumen	4–0	1–2	1–1	0–0	2–2	0–2	1–1	1–2	0–0	1–2	1–1	2–0	0–0	2–1	3–1	1–1		3–1	1–1	2–2
Volgar Astrakhan	1–1	0–1	0–0	0–0	0–2	0–1	3–0	2–0	2–1	2–0	1–0	0–1	0–0	1–3	1–2	2–0	1–0		1–2	3–2
Yenisey Krasnoyarsk	3–0	1–1	2–1	1–0	4–1	1–0	0–2	4–0	1–0	2–0	1–0	4–1	0–0	2–1	2–0	3–2	3–1	2–1		2–1
Zenit-2 St. Petersburg	0–4	2–0	0–1	4–1	1–0	0–2	3–3	1–2	2–1	1–2	0–1	1–0	2–1	1–1	0–1	2–0	1–2	1–2	0–3	

Source: Soccerway
Legend: Blue = home team win; Yellow = draw; Red = away team win.

== Statistics ==
=== Top goalscorers ===
Rank	Player	Club	Goals
1	(Russia) Andrei Kozlov	Yenisey	15
2	(Russia) Andrei Panyukov	Zenit-2	12
3	(Belarus) Sergei Kornilenko	Krylia Sovetov	10
3	(Russia) Dmitri Skopintsev	Baltika	10
3	(Russia) Artyom Kulishev	Dynamo	10
6	(Russia) Aleksei Sutormin	Volgar	9
7	(Russia) Sergey Samodin	Krylia Sovetov	8
7	(Zambia) Fashion Sakala	Spartak-2	8
7	(Slovenia) Denis Popović	Orenburg	8

Last updated: 25 November 2017
