= 2018–19 Russian Football National League =

Russian National Football League
- Season: 2018–19
- Biggest home win: Tyumen 4–1 Baltika
- Biggest away win: Zenit-2 1–4 Sochi
- Longest losing run: FC Zenit-2 (6 Matches)
- Highest attendance: 30,611 Round 6 Rotor Volgograd Vs. Luch Energiya 12 August 2018
- All statistics correct as of 30 July 2018.

The 2018–19 Russian National Football League was the 27th season of Russia's second-tier football league since the dissolution of the Soviet Union. The season began on 17 July 2018 and ended on 25 May 2019.

Winner: Fc tambov with 73 points

== Team changes ==
=== To FNL ===
Promoted from PFL

- Chertanovo Moscow
- Armavir
- Mordovia Saransk
- Krasnodar-2

Relegated from Premier League

- SKA-Khabarovsk

=== From FNL ===
Relegated to PFL

- Volgar Astrakhan

Promoted to Premier League

- Orenburg
- Krylia Sovetov Samara
- Yenisey Krasnoyarsk

=== Excluded teams ===
Amkar Perm and Tosno were excluded from Premier League due to financial problems, but were also refused a license for the 2018–19 Russian Professional Football League, being subsequently dissolved.

Kuban Krasnodar was excluded from championship due to financial problems, then being dissolved.

Ararat Moscow was promoted from 2017–18 PFL, but were refused a license for the 2018–19 Russian National Football League, the club being subsequently dissolved.

=== Teams spared from relegation ===
Zenit-2 Saint Petersburg, Rotor Volgograd, Luch Vladivostok, Tyumen and Fakel Voronezh were spared from relegation due to lack of teams enrolled for the 2018–19 season.

=== Other teams ===
Sakhalin Yuzhno-Sakhalinsk finished on the promotion place at the end of the 2017–18 PFL season, but refused to be promoted.

=== Renamed teams ===
Dynamo Saint Petersburg was moved from Saint Petersburg to Sochi and renamed as PFC Sochi.

Olimpiyets Nizhny Novgorod was renamed to FC Nizhny Novgorod.

Luch-Energiya Vladivostok was renamed to Luch Vladivostok.

== Stadia by capacity ==
Club	City	Stadium	Capacity
Armavir	Armavir	Yunost	5,700
Avangard	Kursk	Trudovye Rezervy	11,329
Baltika	Kaliningrad	Arena Baltika	25,000
Chertanovo	Moscow	Arena Chertanovo	500
Fakel	Voronezh	Tsentralnyi Profsoyuz	31,793
Khimki	Khimki	Rodina	5,083
Krasnodar-2	Krasnodar	Krasnodar Academy	3,500
Luch	Vladivostok	Dynamo	10,200
Mordovia	Saransk	Mordovia Arena	28,000
Nizhny Novgorod	Nizhny Novgorod	Nizhny Novgorod	44,899
Rotor	Volgograd	Volgograd Arena	45,568
Shinnik	Yaroslavl	Shinnik	22,990
Sibir	Novosibirsk	Spartak	12,500
SKA	Khabarovsk	Lenin	15,200
Sochi	Sochi	Fisht Olympic	47,659
Spartak-2	Moscow	Spartak Academy	4,000
Tambov	Tambov	Spartak	8,000
Tom	Tomsk	Trud	10,028
Tyumen	Tyumen	Geolog	13,057
Zenit-2	Saint Petersburg	MSA Petrovsky / Petrovsky	2,809 / 21,405

== Stadia by locations ==
Location of teams in 2018–19 FNL.
Location of Moscow teams.

== Personnel and kits ==
Note: Flags indicate national team as has been defined under FIFA eligibility rules. Players and Managers may hold more than one non-FIFA nationality.

Team	Manager	Captain	Kit manufacturer	Shirt sponsor
Armavir	(Russia) Arsen Papikyan	(Russia) Sergei Miroshnichenko	Adidas	
Avangard Kursk	(Russia) Igor Belyayev	(Russia) Mikhail Bagayev	Adidas	
Baltika Kaliningrad	(Russia) Valery Nepomnyashchy	(Russia) Aleksandr Sheshukov	Jako	Sodruzhestvo
Chertanovo Moscow	(Russia) Igor Osinkin	(Russia) Aleksandr Soldatenkov	Nike	Chertanovo Education Center
Fakel Voronezh	(Kazakhstan) Sergei Volgin	(Russia) Igor Lebedenko	Adidas	TNS Energo
Khimki	(Russia) Igor Shalimov	(Russia) Aleksandr Dimidko	Puma	
Krasnodar-2	(Moldova) Igor Picușceac	(Russia) Ivan Taranov	Puma	WAFF!
Luch Vladivostok	(Russia) Rustem Khuzin	(Russia) Maksim Nasadyuk	Nike	
Mordovia Saransk	(Russia) Marat Mustafin	(Russia) Ruslan Mukhametshin	Nike	
Nizhny Novgorod	(Russia) Dmitri Cheryshev	(Russia) Andrei Khripkov	Jako	
Rotor Volgograd	(Russia) Robert Yevdokimov	(Russia) Ismail Ediyev	Jako	
Shinnik Yaroslavl	(Russia) Aleksandr Pobegalov	(Russia) Eldar Nizamutdinov	Jako	
Sibir Novosibirsk	(Russia) Sergei Kirsanov	(Moldova) Eugeniu Cebotaru	Jako	
SKA-Khabarovsk	(Russia) Sergei Perednya	(Ukraine) Denys Dedechko	Adidas	
Sochi	(Russia) Aleksandr Tochilin	(Russia) Yevgeni Pesegov	Nike	
Spartak-2 Moscow	(Russia) Viktor Bulatov	(Russia) Nikolai Tyunin	Nike	Lukoil
Tambov	(Russia) Timur Shipshev	(Montenegro) Mladen Kašćelan	Jako	
Tom Tomsk	(Russia) Vasili Baskakov	(Russia) Sergei Zuykov	Joma	
Tyumen	(Serbia) Goran Aleksić	(Russia) Ivan Chudin	Jako	Sibur
Zenit-2 Saint Petersburg	(Russia) Vladislav Radimov	(Russia) Sergei Bugriyev	Nike	Gazprom

== League table ==
Pos	Team	Pld	W	D	L	GF	GA	GD	Pts	Promotion, qualification or relegation
1	Tambov (C, P)	38	21	10	7	55	35	+20	73	Promotion to Premier League
2	Sochi (P)	38	19	12	7	63	34	+29	69	Promotion to Premier League
3	Tom Tomsk	38	17	13	8	40	25	+15	64	Qualification to Premier League play-offs
4	Nizhny Novgorod	38	18	8	12	41	31	+10	62	Qualification to Premier League play-offs
5	Chertanovo Moscow	38	17	10	11	65	53	+12	61	
6	Shinnik Yaroslavl	38	16	12	10	42	31	+11	60	
7	SKA-Khabarovsk	38	15	13	10	46	41	+5	58	
8	Avangard Kursk	38	16	8	14	48	42	+6	56	
9	Khimki	38	14	11	13	47	49	−2	53	
10	Krasnodar-2	38	12	15	11	45	52	−7	51	Ineligible for promotion
11	Rotor Volgograd	38	12	14	12	34	36	−2	50	
12	Mordovia Saransk	38	12	11	15	37	46	−9	47	
13	Luch Vladivostok	38	10	17	11	29	28	+1	47	
14	Spartak-2 Moscow	38	12	10	16	45	47	−2	46	Ineligible for promotion
15	Armavir	38	10	14	14	32	44	−12	44	
16	Baltika Kaliningrad (Note: On 28 May 2019, FC Sakhalin Yuzhno-Sakhalinsk won the East zone of the Russian Professional Football League. As they have not applied for the FNL license, they will not be promoted and Baltika will not be relegated.)	38	10	12	16	38	52	−14	42	
17	Fakel Voronezh (Note: On 29 May 2019, FC Anzhi Makhachkala, which was relegated to FNL at the end of the 2018–19 Russian Premier League season, recalled their appeal to the Russian Football Union on earlier RFU's decision to deny them the FNL license. Therefore Anzhi will not play in the FNL in the 2019–20 season and Fakel will not be relegated.)	38	9	14	15	36	40	−4	41	
18	Sibir Novosibirsk (Note: Team folded after season and phoenix club joined the 2019-2020 Russian Professional Football League season.)	38	8	13	17	28	45	−17	37	Dissolved after the season
19	Zenit-2 Saint Petersburg	38	7	7	24	33	57	−24	28	Relegation to Professional Football League
20	Tyumen (Note: Tyumen is stripped of six points for CAS requirements fulfillment failure.)	38	5	16	17	30	46	−16	25	Relegation to Professional Football League

Source: Football National League (Russian), Soccerway
Rules for classification: 1) Points; 2) Matches won; 3) Head-to-head points; 4) Head-to-head matches won; 5) Head-to-head goal difference; 6) Head-to-head goals scored; 7) Head-to-head away goals; 8) Goal difference; 9) Goals scored; 10) Away goals scored.
(C) Champion; (P) Promoted to Premier League

== Results ==
Home \ Away	ARM	AVA	BAL	CHE	FAK	KHI	KR2	LUC	MOR	NNO	ROT	SHI	SIB	SKA	SOC	SP2	TAM	TOM	TYU	ZE2
Armavir		0–0	2–2	1–3	4–1	0–2	3–3	1–1	0–1	2–1	2–2	0–0	0–1	2–0	0–3	0–0	1–3	0–0	1–0	1–0
Avangard Kursk	1–0		0–2	2–1	1–0	4–0	1–1	2–2	2–0	1–1	1–0	1–2	3–2	1–1	2–1	3–2	0–0	0–0	2–0	2–1
Baltika Kaliningrad	1–1	2–1		2–0	0–2	2–1	1–4	0–2	1–0	1–2	1–1	1–0	1–1	1–0	2–2	2–0	1–2	1–0	1–1	0–2
Chertanovo Moscow	1–1	3–2	3–1		2–1	2–1	3–0	1–1	0–2	3–1	1–1	0–1	2–1	2–2	2–6	1–0	0–1	1–1	4–0	4–0
Fakel Voronezh	0–0	3–2	1–1	1–1		2–0	0–0	1–1	1–2	1–0	0–0	3–0	0–1	1–3	1–2	3–0	0–0	0–0	1–1	2–2
Khimki	2–3	3–1	3–3	3–2	1–1		3–0	2–1	1–1	0–2	1–1	1–0	1–1	0–0	0–0	1–3	2–0	0–1	2–1	3–0
Krasnodar-2	0–0	0–2	2–1	3–1	1–2	4–2		2–1	1–2	0–2	0–0	1–1	1–1	1–1	0–2	0–3	2–0	1–1	0–0	2–1
Luch Vladivostok	3–0	1–0	0–0	0–0	1–0	0–1	0–1		0–1	1–0	1–0	0–2	1–0	0–2	0–1	2–0	0–1	2–2	1–1	1–0
Mordovia Saransk	2–1	1–4	1–0	1–2	1–1	1–1	1–2	0–0		2–2	1–0	0–0	3–0	0–1	0–2	0–1	1–3	0–1	1–1	1–0
Nizhny Novgorod	1–0	0–1	0–0	2–1	1–0	1–1	3–0	0–0	3–1		1–3	0–1	1–0	0–1	0–0	3–1	1–0	2–1	2–1	1–0
Rotor Volgograd	0–1	1–0	1–0	1–2	1–2	1–0	1–0	1–0	3–1	2–1		1–3	2–0	2–2	1–1	0–0	1–2	0–0	2–1	1–1
Shinnik Yaroslavl	0–0	4–2	1–0	3–3	1–0	0–1	2–2	0–0	1–2	1–0	0–0		2–1	1–1	1–1	1–1	3–0	1–0	1–0	1–0
Sibir Novosibirsk	0–1	1–0	2–1	1–2	2–0	1–2	0–0	0–0	0–0	0–0	1–1	0–2		1–1	0–1	1–0	0–2	1–0	2–0	0–1
SKA-Khabarovsk	3–0	1–0	1–1	1–3	2–1	0–1	2–2	0–0	2–1	1–0	0–1	1–0	1–1		2–2	1–0	1–2	1–0	2–1	3–1
Sochi	1–0	1–0	4–1	2–1	0–2	3–2	1–1	2–2	0–2	0–1	4–2	0–0	4–1	2–0		0–1	0–0	3–1	1–1	2–0
Spartak-2 Moscow	1–2	0–0	2–1	0–2	2–1	0–1	2–3	2–2	4–0	1–2	2–0	1–4	3–0	2–1	1–1		2–2	1–1	0–0	1–1
Tambov	0–1	3–1	2–0	2–2	0–0	3–0	1–2	2–1	2–2	0–0	1–0	1–0	3–1	3–2	0–3	2–0		3–0	1–1	2–1
Tom Tomsk	3–0	1–0	1–1	3–1	2–0	2–0	0–0	0–0	1–0	0–1	2–0	2–0	1–1	4–1	1–0	2–1	1–1		1–0	1–0
Tyumen	1–0	0–1	4–1	1–1	1–1	0–0	0–1	0–0	1–1	2–1	0–1	3–2	0–0	1–1	2–1	1–2	1–3	1–2		1–2
Zenit-2 Saint Petersburg	1–1	1–2	0–1	1–2	1–0	2–2	5–2	0–1	3–1	1–2	0–1	1–0	2–2	0–1	1–4	0–3	1–2	0–1	0–0	

Source: Soccerway
Legend: Blue = home team win; Yellow = draw; Red = away team win.

== Statistics ==
=== Top goalscorers ===
As of match played 4 May 2019

Rank	Player	Club	Goals
1	(Russia) Maksim Barsov	Sochi	19
2	(Russia) Igor Lebedenko	Fakel	14
3	(Russia) Maksim Glushenkov	Spartak-2	12
3	(Russia) Vladimir Obukhov	Tambov	12
3	(Russia) Vladislav Sarveli	Chertanovo	12
6	(Russia) Anton Zinkovsky	Chertanovo	11
7	(Russia) Roman Akbashev	Avangard	10
7	(Russia) Ilya Kukharchuk	Khimki	10
7	(Russia) Vladislav Panteleyev	Spartak-2	10
7	(Russia) Yevgeni Pesegov	Sochi	10
