= Sergei Chesnakov =

Russian footballer, coach, and manager

Personal information
- Full name: Sergei Ivanovich Chesnakov
- Date of birth: 31 October 1974 (age 51)
- Place of birth: Voronezh, Russian SFSR
- Height: 1.86 m (6 ft 1 in)
- Position: Goalkeeper

Team information
- Current team: FC Salyut Belgorod (assistant coach)

Youth career
- DYuSShOR-15 Voronezh

Senior career*
Years	Team	Apps	(Gls)
1993–1994	FC Iskra Smolensk	28	(0)
1995	FC Iskra Smolensk (amateur)		
1995	CSK VVS-Kristall Smolensk	0	(0)
1996	Interas-AE Visaginas		
1996–2000	FC Avangard Kursk	103	(0)
2001–2002	FC Metallurg Krasnoyarsk	35	(0)
2003–2004	FC Fakel Voronezh	30	(0)
2005–2006	FC Avangard Kursk	52	(0)
2007–2008	FC Salyut-Energia Belgorod	49	(0)
2009–2010	FC Gubkin	33	(0)
2010–2011	FC Dnepr Smolensk	14	(0)
2012–2013	FC Kameya-SGAFKSiT Smolensk (amateur)		
2013–2014	FC Dnepr Smolensk	0	(0)

Managerial career
- 2015–2019: FC Dnepr Smolensk (assistant)
- 2019: FC Volga Ulyanovsk (GK coach)
- 2019–2023: FC Luki-Energiya Velikiye Luki (assistant)
- 2024–: FC Salyut Belgorod (assistant)
- * Club domestic league appearances and goals

Sergei Ivanovich Chesnakov (Russian: Серге́й Иванович Чеснаков; born 31 October 1974) is a Russian professional football manager and a former player. He is an assistant coach with FC Salyut Belgorod.

== Club career ==
He played seven seasons in the Russian Football National League for four different clubs.
