= Torpedo Stadium =

Torpedo Stadium may refer to one of the following stadia:

- Torpedo Stadium (Kokshetau) in Kazakhstan
- Eduard Streltsov Stadium (Torpedo Stadium), Moscow
- Torpedo Stadium (Togliatti) in Russia
- Torpedo Stadium (Vladimir) in Russia
- Torpedo Stadium (Mahilyow) in Belarus
- Torpedo Stadium (Minsk) in Belarus
- Torpedo Stadium (Zhodino) in Belarus
