= Zazdravnykh =

Zazdravnykh is a Russian surname. Notable people with the surname include:

- Valentina Zazdravnykh (1954–2023), Soviet field hockey player
- Valery Zazdravnykh (born 1963), Russian football player and coach
