= Aleksandr Kobenko =

Russian footballer

Personal information
- Full name: Aleksandr Vasilyevich Kobenko
- Date of birth: 23 August 1977 (age 49)
- Place of birth: Maykop, Russian SFSR
- Height: 1.69 m (5 ft 6 1/2 in)
- Position: Midfielder

Youth career
- DYuSSh Maykop

Senior career*
Years	Team	Apps	(Gls)
1994	Chernomorets Novorossiysk	1	(0)
1995–1996	Druzhba Maykop	5	(0)
1995–1996	→ Druzhba-d Maykop	46	(0)
1997	Rostselmash Rostov-on-Don	3	(0)
1997	→ Rostselmash-2 Rostov-on-Don	14	(1)
1998	Torpedo Taganrog	32	(1)
1999	FC Krasnodar (amateur)		
2001–2003	Slavyansk Slavyansk-na-Kubani	94	(1)
2004–2005	Slavia Mozyr	31	(0)
2006	Smolensk	14	(0)
2007	Mozyr	21	(0)
- * Club domestic league appearances and goals

Aleksandr Vasilyevich Kobenko (Russian: Александр Васильевич Кобенко; born 23 August 1977) is a former Russian football player.

He is the older brother of Andrei Kobenko.
