= Vladimir Silovanov =

Russian footballer and manager (1967–2023)

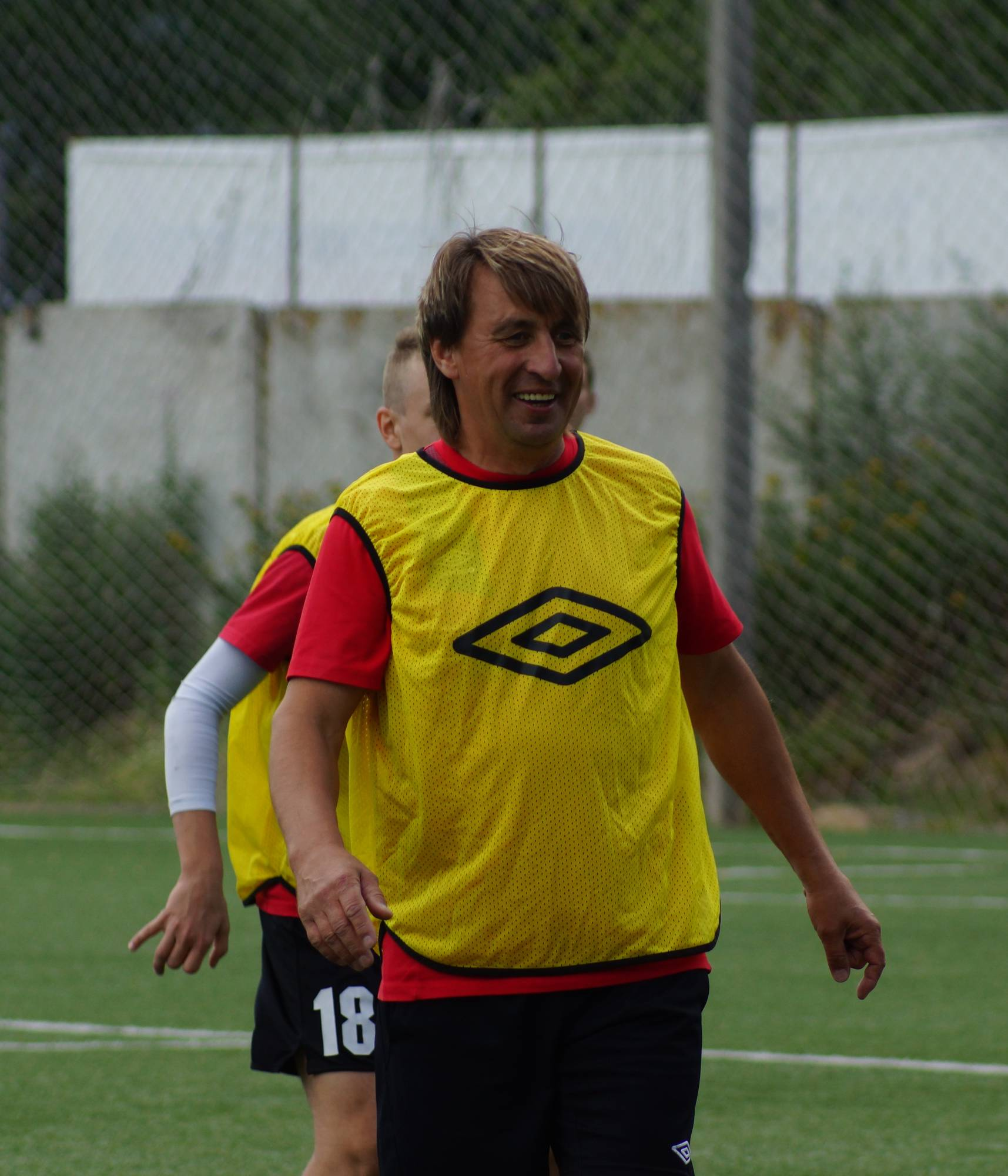

Personal information
- Full name: Vladimir Mikhailovich Silovanov
- Date of birth: 3 February 1967
- Place of birth: Zekhnovo, Ostashkovsky District, Tver Oblast, Russian SFSR, USSR
- Date of death: 14 July 2023 (aged 56)
- Height: 1.77 m (5 ft 10 in)
- Position: Midfielder

Youth career
- SGIFK Smolensk

Senior career*
Years	Team	Apps	(Gls)
1992	SKD Smolensk	19	(1)
1993	Kristall Smolensk	28	(3)
1994	Iskra Smolensk	22	(4)
1995	Interas-AE Visaginas	5	(0)
1997	Naftan-Devon Novopolotsk	3	(0)

Managerial career
- 2007: Smolensk
- 2010–2011: Gornyak Uchaly (assistant)
- 2011–2012: Gornyak Uchaly
- 2013: FC Khimik-Rossosh Rossosh
- 2014: Volga Tver (assistant)
- 2014: Volga Tver
- 2014: Volga Tver (assistant)
- 2015: Dnepr Smolensk (assistant)
- 2015–2016: CRFSO Smolensk
- 2017–2018: Iskra Smolensk
- 2019–2020: Volna Nizhny Novgorod Oblast
- 2020–2021: Smolensk
- 2021–2023: Volna Nizhny Novgorod Oblast
- * Club domestic league appearances and goals

Vladimir Mikhailovich Silovanov (Russian: Владимир Михайлович Силованов; 3 February 1967 – 14 July 2023) was a Russian professional football manager and player.

Silovanov died on 14 July 2023, at the age of 56.
