= FC Dnepr =

FC Dnepr may refer to multiple association football clubs:

- FC Dnepr-DUSSh-1 Rogachev, a defunct football club from Rogachev, Belarus.
- FC Dnepr Mogilev, football club from Mogilev, Belarus.
- FC Dnepr Smolensk, football club from Smolensk, Russia.
- FC Dnipro, football club from Dnipro, Ukraine that was known as FC Dnepr Dnepropetrovsk, the Russian language spelling of the club, during the Soviet control of Ukraine.
