= Valeri Bogdanets =

Ukrainian association football player

Personal information
- Full name: Valeri Vladimirovich Bogdanets
- Date of birth: 9 April 1960 (age 66)
- Place of birth: Poltava, Ukrainian SSR
- Height: 1.71 m (5 ft 7 in)
- Position: Midfielder

Senior career*
Years	Team	Apps	(Gls)
1978	FC Kolos Poltava		
1983	FC Iskra Smolensk	16	(0)
1984–1985	FC Nistru Chişinău	52	(5)
1986	FC Vorskla Poltava		
1987	FC Nistru Chişinău	9	(0)
1987	FC Tekstilshchik Tiraspol	16	(2)
1988–1990	FC Vorskla Poltava	95	(5)
1992	FC Dinamo-Codru Chişinău	19	(0)
1992	Speranța Nisporeni	11	(0)
1993	Moldova Boroseni	28	(7)
1994	Torentul Chișinău	14	(0)
1994–1996	MHM-93 Chișinău	7	(0)

Managerial career
- 1999: FC Kristall-2 Smolensk
- 1999–2008: FC Kristall Smolensk (academy)
- 2005–2010: Russia U-17 (assistant)
- 2008–2009: FC Khimki (academy director)
- 2011–2012: FC Rostov-M Rostov-on-Don (assistant)
- 2012–2014: SDYuSShOR-94 Rublyovo Moscow
- 2015: FC Volga-Olimpiyets Nizhny Novgorod
- 2021: FC Volna Nizhny Novgorod Oblast
- * Club domestic league appearances and goals

Valeri Vladimirovich Bogdanets (Russian: Валерий Владимирович Богданец; born 9 April 1960) is a Russian football manager and former player. He also holds Moldovan citizenship and his name in Moldovan is spelled Valeriu Bogdăneț.

== Honours ==
Moldova Boroseni

- Moldovan National Division bronze: 1992–93
