= Pavel Shadrin =

Russian footballer (born 1993)

Personal information
- Full name: Pavel Anatolyevich Shadrin
- Date of birth: 14 January 1993 (age 33)
- Place of birth: Izhevsk, Russia
- Height: 1.77 m (5 ft 10 in)
- Position: Midfielder

Youth career
- FC Rubin Kazan

Senior career*
Years	Team	Apps	(Gls)
2011–2015	FC Rubin-2 Kazan	106	(17)
2014–2015	FC Rubin Kazan	0	(0)
2015–2017	FC Zenit-Izhevsk	47	(11)
2017–2021	FC Neftekhimik Nizhnekamsk	90	(6)
2021	FC Delin Izhevsk		
2021–2022	FC Tyumen	25	(8)
2022	FC Delin Izhevsk		
2023–2024	FC Tyumen	20	(1)
- * Club domestic league appearances and goals as of 25 May 2024

Pavel Anatolyevich Shadrin (Russian: Павел Анатольевич Шадрин; born 14 January 1993) is a Russian football midfielder.

== Club career ==
He made his debut in the Russian Second Division for FC Rubin-2 Kazan on 25 April 2011 in a game against FC Zenit-Izhevsk

He made his Russian Football National League debut for FC Neftekhimik Nizhnekamsk on 7 July 2019 in a game against FC Mordovia Saransk.

== Honours ==
- Russian Professional Football League Zone Ural-Povolzhye Best Player: 2016–17.
