= Sergei Gunko =

Russian footballer and coach

Personal information
- Full name: Sergei Valentinovich Gunko
- Date of birth: 12 January 1973 (age 53)
- Height: 1.74 m (5 ft 9 in)
- Position: Defender

Senior career*
| Years | Team | Apps | (Gls) |
| 1992 | FC Turbostroitel Kaluga | 10 | (1) |
| 1993–2002 | FC Kristall Smolensk | 319 | (28) |
| 2002 | FC Rubin Kazan | 12 | (0) |
| 2003 | FC Kristall Smolensk | 19 | (1) |
| 2003–2005 | FC Sodovik Sterlitamak | 78 | (2) |
| 2006 | FC Baltika Kaliningrad | 36 | (0) |
| 2007–2008 | FC Volga Ulyanovsk | 40 | (3) |

Managerial career
- 2011–2012: SC Smolensk (D4)
- 2012–2015: FC Dnepr Smolensk
- 2015–2016: FC Astrakhan
- 2016–2019: FC Dnepr Smolensk
- 2019: FC Orsha (assistant)
- 2019: FC Volga Ulyanovsk
- 2020: FC Smolensk
- 2021: FC Luki-Energiya Velikiye Luki
- * Club domestic league appearances and goals

Sergei Valentinovich Gunko (Russian: Серге́й Валентинович Гунько; born 12 January 1973) is a Russian professional football coach and a former player.
