= Aleksandr Fomichyov =

Russian footballer and coach

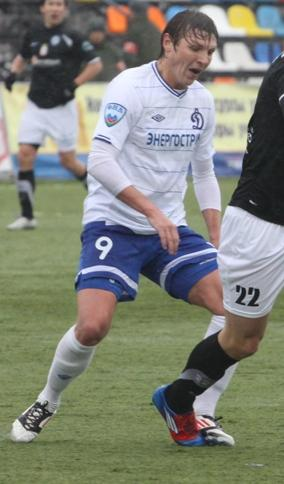
- Fomichyov with Dynamo Bryansk in 2012

Personal information
- Full name: Aleksandr Ivanovich Fomichyov
- Date of birth: 7 January 1979 (age 47)
- Place of birth: Bryansk, Russian SFSR, Soviet Union
- Height: 1.81 m (5 ft 11 in)
- Position: Midfielder

Youth career
- SGIFK Smolensk

Senior career*
Years	Team	Apps	(Gls)
1998	FC Kristall Smolensk	0	(0)
1999	FC Oazis Yartsevo	27	(0)
2000–2001	FC Biokhimik-Mordoviya Saransk	32	(4)
2002–2005	FC Dynamo Bryansk	139	(19)
2006	FC Sodovik Sterlitamak	28	(2)
2007–2008	FC Dynamo Bryansk	75	(2)
2009	FC Metallurg Lipetsk	32	(1)
2010–2012	FC Dynamo Bryansk	71	(2)
2012–2013	FC Dynamo Bryansk (amateur)		
2013–2016	FC Dynamo Bryansk	75	(7)

Managerial career
- 2017–2021: FC Dynamo Bryansk (assistant)
- 2021–2024: FC Dynamo Bryansk
- 2024–2026: FC Dynamo Saint Petersburg
- * Club domestic league appearances and goals

Aleksandr Ivanovich Fomichyov (Russian: Александр Иванович Фомичёв; born 7 January 1979) is a Russian professional football coach and a former player.

== Club career ==
He played eight seasons in the Russian Football National League for FC Dynamo Bryansk, FC Sodovik Sterlitamak and FC Metallurg Lipetsk.
