= Lev Ivanov (football manager) =

Russian professional football coach (born 1967)

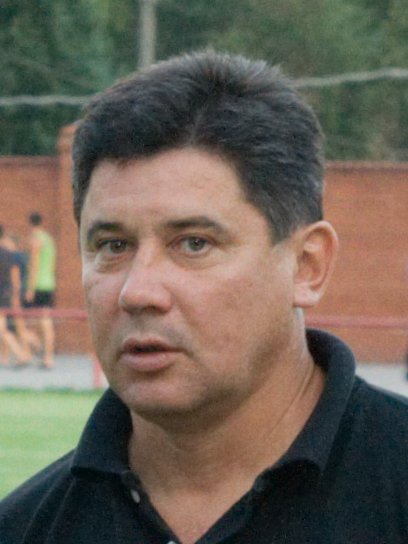
- Ivanov in 2009

Personal information
- Full name: Lev Viktorovich Ivanov
- Date of birth: 19 December 1967 (age 58)

Managerial career
- Years: Team
- 2000–2001: FC Rotor Volgograd (reserves)
- 2002: FC Torpedo Volzhsky
- 2003: FC Rotor Volgograd (reserves)
- 2004: FC Rotor-2 Volgograd
- 2004: FC Rotor Volgograd (assistant)
- 2004: FC Rotor Volgograd (reserves)
- 2005–2006: FC Olimpia Volgograd
- 2007: FC Tekstilshchik Kamyshin
- 2008: FC Olimpia Volgograd
- 2009: FC Volgograd
- 2010–2011: FC Volgar-Gazprom Astrakhan
- 2011: FC Zenit Penza
- 2012: FC Olimpia Volgograd
- 2015: FC Astrakhan
- 2016–2017: FC Rotor Volgograd
- 2018: FC Dynamo Stavropol
- 2018–2020: FC Dynamo Stavropol

Lev Viktorovich Ivanov (Russian: Лев Викторович Иванов; born 19 December 1967) is a Russian professional football coach.

== Honours ==
- Russian Professional Football League Zone Ural-Povolzhye best coach: 2016–17.
