= Vladislav Aksyutenko =

Russian footballer

Personal information
- Full name: Vladislav Sergeyevich Aksyutenko
- Date of birth: 28 April 1983 (age 43)
- Place of birth: Rubtsovsk, Altai Krai, Russian SFSR
- Height: 1.76 m (5 ft 9 in)
- Position: Forward

Senior career*
Years	Team	Apps	(Gls)
2002	FC Torpedo-Alttrak Rubtsovsk	26	(2)
2003	FC Shakhtyor Prokopyevsk	22	(5)
2004	FC Okean Nakhodka	24	(3)
2005–2008	FC Dynamo Barnaul	91	(24)
2009–2010	FC SKA-Energiya Khabarovsk	22	(2)
2010	→ FC Dynamo Barnaul (loan)	12	(7)
2010–2011	FC Gazovik Orenburg	18	(3)
2011–2012	FC Chernomorets Novorossiysk	26	(4)
2012–2013	FC Gazovik Orenburg	21	(7)
2013–2014	FC Tyumen	9	(1)
2015	FC Vityaz Krymsk	13	(9)
2015–2016	FC Dynamo Barnaul	19	(12)
2016–2017	FC Sakhalin Yuzhno-Sakhalinsk	4	(1)
2017–2018	FC Dynamo Barnaul	14	(5)
2018–2020	FC Sakhalin Yuzhno-Sakhalinsk	23	(3)
2020	FC Novokuznetsk (amateur)		
- * Club domestic league appearances and goals

Vladislav Sergeyevich Aksyutenko (Russian: Владислав Серге́евич Аксютенко; born 28 April 1983) is a Russian former professional football player.

== Club career ==
He made his Russian Football National League debut for FC Dynamo Barnaul on 27 March 2008 in a game against FC Ural Yekaterinburg.

== Honours ==
- Russian Professional Football League Zone East Top Goalscorer: 2015–16 (12 goals).
