= Sergei Trubitsin =

Russian footballer and manager

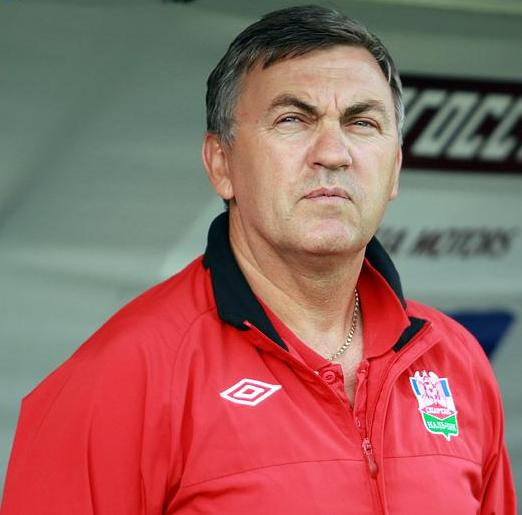

Personal information
- Full name: Sergei Aleksandrovich Trubitsin
- Date of birth: 5 December 1959 (age 66)
- Place of birth: Nalchik, Russian SFSR
- Position: Midfielder

Youth career
- PFC Spartak Nalchik

Senior career*
Years	Team	Apps	(Gls)
1978–1989	PFC Spartak Nalchik	373	(45)
1990	FC Volga Tver	13	(0)
1990	FC Volgar Astrakhan	22	(3)
1991	PFC Spartak Nalchik	41	(2)
1992	KuPS	0	(0)
1992–1994	FC Kavkazkabel Prokhladny	77	(4)
1996	FC Kabardey-ZET Nizhny Cherek	2	(0)

Managerial career
- 1994–2010: PFC Spartak Nalchik (assistant)
- 2011: FC Volga Nizhny Novgorod (assistant)
- 2012: FC Khimki (assistant)
- 2013–2014: FC Zhetysu (assistant)
- 2015: FC Mashuk-KMV Pyatigorsk (assistant)
- 2015–2016: FC Mashuk-KMV Pyatigorsk
- 2016: FC Dynamo Stavropol (assistant)
- 2017–2019: PFC Spartak Nalchik
- * Club domestic league appearances and goals

Sergei Aleksandrovich Trubitsin (Russian: Сергей Александрович Трубицин; born 5 December 1959) is a Russian football manager and a former player.

== Playing career ==
He is third on the all-time PFC Spartak Nalchik most games list with over 440 official games for the team.
