= Igor Surin =

Russian footballer

Personal information
- Full name: Igor Anatolyevich Surin
- Date of birth: 19 November 1974 (age 51)
- Height: 1.89 m (6 ft 2 1/2 in)
- Position: Defender

Senior career*
Years	Team	Apps	(Gls)
1992–1995	FC Mashinostroitel Pskov	79	(4)
1996–1997	FC Lokomotiv Nizhny Novgorod	2	(0)
1996–1997	FC Lokomotiv-d Nizhny Novgorod	48	(0)
1998–2001	FC Pskov	69	(3)
2002–2003	FC BSK Spirovo	69	(3)
2004–2005	FC Sheksna Cherepovets	60	(4)
2006	FC Volga Tver	22	(0)
2007–2017	FC Pskov-747 Pskov	226	(0)
- * Club domestic league appearances and goals as of 4 June 2017

Igor Anatolyevich Surin (Russian: Игорь Анатольевич Сурин; born 19 November 1974) is a former Russian professional footballer.

== Club career ==
He made his debut in the Russian Premier League during 1996 for FC Lokomotiv Nizhny Novgorod.
