= Aleksandr Akimov (footballer) =

Russian footballer and manager

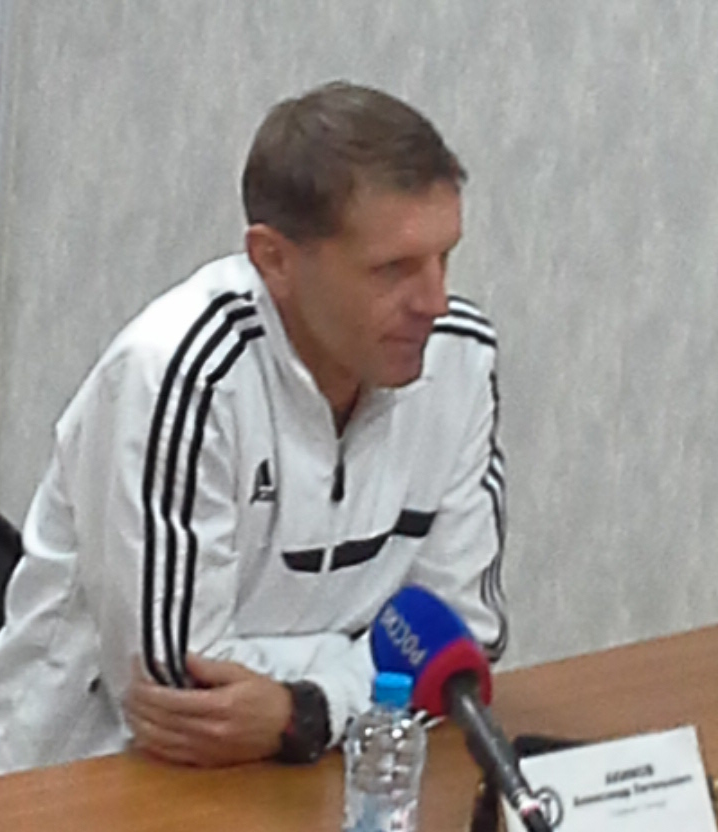
- Akimov in May 2014

Personal information
- Full name: Aleksandr Yevgenyevich Akimov
- Date of birth: 11 January 1972 (age 54)
- Place of birth: Vladimir, Russian SFSR
- Height: 1.84 m (6 ft 0 in)
- Position: Defender

Youth career
- DYuSSh SK Motor Vladimir

Senior career*
Years	Team	Apps	(Gls)
1990–1991	FC Start Ulyanovsk	7	(0)
1992–1999	FC Lada Dimitrovgrad	222	(3)
2000	FC Baltika Kaliningrad	23	(0)
2001–2003	FC Volga Ulyanovsk	94	(2)
2004–2008	FC Torpedo Vladimir	143	(1)
2012	FC Torpedo Vladimir		

Managerial career
- 2009–2011: FC Torpedo Vladimir (assistant)
- 2011–2015: FC Torpedo Vladimir
- 2016: FC Torpedo Vladimir (assistant)
- 2016–2018: FC Torpedo Vladimir
- 2018–2024: FC Torpedo Vladimir (director)
- * Club domestic league appearances and goals

Aleksandr Yevgenyevich Akimov (Russian: Александр Евгеньевич Акимов; born 11 January 1972) is a Russian football manager and a former player.
