= Mikhail Semyonov (footballer) =

Russian footballer and manager

Personal information
- Full name: Mikhail Nikolayevich Semyonov
- Date of birth: 3 April 1969 (age 57)
- Place of birth: Khabarovsk, Russian SFSR
- Height: 1.84 m (6 ft 1/2 in)
- Position: Defender

Youth career
- SKA Khabarovsk

Senior career*
Years	Team	Apps	(Gls)
1986–1999	SKA Khabarovsk	267	(30)
1999–2000	Metallurg Novokuznetsk	22	(1)
2001	Selenga Ulan-Ude	13	(0)
2002–2005	Smena Komsomolsk-na-Amure	96	(3)

Managerial career
- 2010: SKA-Energia-2 Khabarovsk
- 2011–2012: Amur-2010 Blagoveshchensk
- 2012–2016: Smena Komsomolsk-na-Amure
- 2016–2018: Kuban Krasnodar (assistant)
- 2016: Kuban Krasnodar (caretaker)
- 2018–2019: Urozhay Krasnodar (assistant)
- 2019–2021: Baltika Kaliningrad (assistant)
- 2022: Tver (assistant)
- 2022–2023: Akron Tolyatti (assistant)
- 2023–2024: Alania Vladikavkaz (assistant)
- 2024: Chayka Peschanokopskoye (assistant)
- 2026: SKA-Khabarovsk (assistant)
- 2026: SKA-Khabarovsk
- * Club domestic league appearances and goals

Mikhail Nikolayevich Semyonov (Russian: Михаил Николаевич Семенов; born 3 April 1969) is a Russian professional football coach and a former player.

== Playing career ==
As a player, he made his debut in the Soviet First League in 1986 for SKA Khabarovsk.

== Honours ==
- Russian Professional Football League Zone East Best Manager: 2015–16.
