= Aleksei Lipatnikov =

Russian footballer and coach

Personal information
- Full name: Aleksei Leonidovich Lipatnikov
- Date of birth: 20 July 1964 (age 62)
- Height: 1.64 m (5 ft 4 1/2 in)
- Positions: Midfielder; striker

Team information
- Current team: FC Dynamo Kirov (asst manager)

Senior career*
Years	Team	Apps	(Gls)
1988–1994	FC Dynamo Kirov	228	(13)
1999	FC Dynamo-Mashinostroitel Kirov	16	(1)

Managerial career
- 2006: FC Dynamo Barnaul (assistant)
- 2007: FC Shakhtyor Prokopyevsk
- 2008: FC Dynamo Kirov (director)
- 2009–2010: FC Dynamo Kirov
- 2011: FC Irtysh Omsk (assistant)
- 2011: FC Irtysh Omsk
- 2011: FC Irtysh Omsk (assistant)
- 2014–2015: FC Dynamo Kirov
- 2016: FC Dynamo Kirov (director)
- 2016–: FC Dynamo Kirov (assistant)
- * Club domestic league appearances and goals

Aleksei Leonidovich Lipatnikov (Russian: Алексей Леонидович Липатников; born 20 July 1964) is a Russian professional football coach and a former player. He is an assistant manager of FC Dynamo Kirov.

== Playing career ==
As a player, he made his debut in the Soviet Second League in 1988 for FC Dynamo Kirov.
