= Vasili Rozhnov =

Russian footballer and coach

Personal information
- Full name: Vasili Sergeyevich Rozhnov
- Date of birth: 29 March 1972 (age 54)
- Place of birth: Kolomna, Moscow Oblast, Russian SFSR
- Height: 1.91 m (6 ft 3 in)
- Position: Midfielder

Youth career
- 1985–1990: FC Avangard Kolomna

Senior career*
Years	Team	Apps	(Gls)
1989	FC Oka Kolomna	5	(0)
1990–1991	FC Avangard Kolomna		
1992–1995	FC Avangard-Kortek Kolomna	156	(25)
1996	FC Saturn Ramenskoye	2	(0)
1996	FC Avangard-Kortek Kolomna	18	(4)
1996–1997	FC Saturn Ramenskoye	5	(0)
1997–2002	FC Spartak Shchyolkovo	157	(23)
2003–2005	FC Dynamo Vologda	81	(10)
2006–2008	FC Sheksna Cherepovets	95	(7)
2009–2012	FC Dynamo Vologda	104	(8)
2012	FC Kolomna		
2013	FC Kolomna-2 Kolomna		

Managerial career
- 2014–2015: FC Arsenal-2 Tula (assistant)
- 2015–2016: FC Arsenal-2 Tula
- 2016–2017: FC Arsenal Tula (U-21)
- 2017: FC Znamya Truda Orekhovo-Zuyevo
- 2018–2019: FC Znamya Truda Orekhovo-Zuyevo
- 2019: FC Kolomna
- 2019: FC Ararat Moscow
- 2021: FC Saturn Ramenskoye (assistant)
- 2021–2022: FC SKA Rostov-on-Don (assistant)
- 2022–2023: FC Balashikha
- * Club domestic league appearances and goals

Vasili Sergeyevich Rozhnov (Russian: Василий Серге́евич Рожнов; born 29 March 1972) is a Russian professional football coach and a former player.
