= Yevgeni Shamrin =

Russian footballer

Personal information
- Full name: Yevgeni Aleksandrovich Shamrin
- Date of birth: 6 December 1982 (age 43)
- Place of birth: Lipetsk, Russian SFSR
- Height: 1.93 m (6 ft 4 in)
- Position: Goalkeeper

Senior career*
Years	Team	Apps	(Gls)
1999–2006	FC Metallurg Lipetsk	40	(0)
2007	FC Zvezda Irkutsk	1	(0)
2008–2009	FC Metallurg Lipetsk	35	(0)
2010	FC Salyut Belgorod	3	(0)
2011–2012	FC SKA-Energiya Khabarovsk	1	(0)
2014–2016	FC Afips Afipsky	41	(0)
- * Club domestic league appearances and goals

Yevgeni Aleksandrovich Shamrin (Russian: Евгений Александрович Шамрин; born 6 December 1982) is a former Russian professional football player.

== Club career ==
He played 6 seasons in the Russian Football National League for 4 different teams.
