= German Tuayev =

Russian footballer

Personal information
- Full name: German Igorevich Tuayev
- Date of birth: 7 April 1992 (age 34)
- Place of birth: Vladikavkaz, Russia
- Height: 1.83 m (6 ft 0 in)
- Positions: Defender; forward

Senior career*
Years	Team	Apps	(Gls)
2010–2011	FC Beslan-FAYUR Beslan	30	(2)
2011	FC Alania Vladikavkaz	3	(0)
2012–2014	FC Alania-d Vladikavkaz	60	(13)
2014–2015	FC Alania Vladikavkaz	36	(6)
2016	FC Druzhba Maykop	2	(0)
- * Club domestic league appearances and goals

German Igorevich Tuayev (Russian: Герман Игоревич Туаев; born 7 April 1992) is a former Russian professional football player.

== Club career ==
He made his Russian Football National League debut for FC Alania Vladikavkaz on 7 June 2011 in a game against FC Torpedo Moscow.
