= Igor Lazarev =

Russian footballer and manager

Personal information
- Full name: Igor Vladimirovich Lazarev
- Date of birth: 18 October 1963 (age 63)
- Height: 1.75 m (5 ft 9 in)
- Position: Defender

Youth career
- SDYuShOR-3 Chelyabinsk

Senior career*
Years	Team	Apps	(Gls)
1981–1983	FC Lokomotiv Chelyabinsk	26	(0)
1986–1987	FC Lokomotiv Chelyabinsk	39	(3)
1988–1992	FC Torpedo Miass	172	(14)
1993	FC Zenit Chelyabinsk	33	(2)
1994–1995	FC Nosta Novotroitsk	68	(3)
1996	FC UralAZ Miass	38	(5)
1997	FC Nosta Novotroitsk	16	(0)
1998–2002	FC Zenit Chelyabinsk	102	(1)

Managerial career
- 2003: FC Zenit Chelyabinsk (administrator)
- 2006: FC Zenit Chelyabinsk
- 2007–2009: FC Chelyabinsk (assistant)
- 2009: FC Chelyabinsk
- 2010–2012: FC Chelyabinsk (assistant)
- 2012–2016: FC Chelyabinsk
- 2019: FC Chelyabinsk (assistant)
- * Club domestic league appearances and goals

Igor Vladimirovich Lazarev (Russian: Игорь Владимирович Лазарев; born 18 October 1963) is a Russian football manager and a former player.

Lazarev played in the Russian First Division with FC Torpedo Miass and FC Zenit Chelyabinsk.
