= Dmitri Voyetskiy =

Russian footballer and manager

Personal information
- Full name: Dmitri Yuryevich Voyetskiy
- Date of birth: 13 January 1975 (age 51)
- Place of birth: Syzran, Russian SFSR
- Position: Forward

Senior career*
Years	Team	Apps	(Gls)
1996	FC Energiya Ulyanovsk		
2000–2003	FC Syzran-2003		

Managerial career
- 2005–2007: FC Syzran-2003 (assistant)
- 2008–2009: FC Syzran-2003 (director)
- 2009–2019: FC Syzran-2003
- 2019: FC Chayka Peschanokopskoye
- 2020: FC Sokol Saratov
- 2021: FC SKA-Khabarovsk (coach)
- 2021–2023: FC Shinnik Yaroslavl (assistant)
- 2023: FC Shinnik Yaroslavl (caretaker)
- 2024: FC SKA-Khabarovsk
- * Club domestic league appearances and goals

Dmitri Yuryevich Voyetskiy (Russian: Дмитрий Юрьевич Воецкий; born 13 January 1975) is a Russian football manager and a former player.

== Coaching career ==
Voyetskiy managed FC Chayka Peschanokopskoye for the first twenty matches of the 2019–20 Russian National Football League season.
