= Sergey Mashnin =

Soviet footballer and Russian manager

Personal information
- Full name: Sergey Ivanovich Mashnin
- Date of birth: 4 May 1967 (age 59)
- Place of birth: Lipetsk, Russian SFSR
- Height: 1.72 m (5 ft 7 1/2 in)
- Position: Midfielder

Senior career*
Years	Team	Apps	(Gls)
1984	FC Lokomotiv Moscow	0	(0)
1985–1986	FC Lokomotiv Chelyabinsk	57	(3)
1987	FC Dynamo Barnaul	19	(1)
1989	FC Zauralye Kurgan	37	(5)
1990–1992	FC Metallurg Lipetsk	93	(9)
1995	FC Metallurg Lipetsk	31	(5)
1996–1997	FC Lokomotiv Yelets	28	(9)
1997–1998	FC Spartak Tambov	50	(13)
1999	FC Metallurg Lipetsk	24	(2)
2000–2001	FC Spartak Tambov	57	(6)

Managerial career
- 2003–2005: FC Metallurg Lipetsk (administrator)
- 2006–2009: FC Metallurg Lipetsk (assistant)
- 2010–2022: FC Metallurg Lipetsk
- 2023–2024: FC Metallurg Lipetsk
- * Club domestic league appearances and goals

Sergey Ivanovich Mashnin (Russian: Серге́й Иванович Машнин; born 4 May 1967) is a professional association football manager from Russia and a former Soviet player.

Mashnin played in the Russian First Division with FC Metallurg Lipetsk.
