= Sergey Shishkin =

Russian footballer and coach

Sergei Shishkin
Personal information
- Full name: Sergei Borisovich Shishkin
- Date of birth: 10 February 1973 (age 53)
- Place of birth: Yakutsk, Russian SFSR
- Height: 1.87 m (6 ft 1 1/2 in)
- Positions: Defender; midfielder

Senior career*
| Years | Team | Apps | (Gls) |
| 1991–1992 | FC Dynamo Yakutsk | 58 | (8) |
| 1993–1994 | PFC CSKA-d Moscow | 65 | (8) |
| 1995–1999 | FC Krylia Sovetov Samara | 123 | (2) |
| 1999–2000 | FC Uralan Elista | 16 | (0) |
| 2000–2001 | FC Fakel Voronezh | 37 | (0) |
| 2002 | FC Gazovik-Gazprom Izhevsk | 17 | (0) |
| 2003 | FC Lada Togliatti | 17 | (0) |
| 2004 | FC Lukoil Chelyabinsk | 6 | (0) |
| 2005 | FC Volga Tver | 5 | (0) |
| 2006–2008 | FC Yunit Samara | 49 | (0) |

Managerial career
- 2011–2015: FC Yakutiya Yakutsk
- 2015: FC Yakutiya Yakutsk (assistant)
- 2015–2016: FC Yakutiya Yakutsk
- 2016–2019: FC Dynamo Barnaul
- * Club domestic league appearances and goals

Sergei Borisovich Shishkin (Russian: Серге́й Борисович Шишкин; born 10 February 1973) is a Russian professional football coach and a former player.

== Playing career ==
He made his professional debut in the Soviet Second League in 1991 for FC Dynamo Yakutsk.
