= Artyom Drobyshev =

Russian footballer

Personal information
- Full name: Artyom Sergeyevich Drobyshev
- Date of birth: 14 September 1980 (age 46)
- Place of birth: Krasnokamensk, Russian SFSR
- Height: 1.87 m (6 ft 2 in)
- Position: Defender

Senior career*
Years	Team	Apps	(Gls)
1998	FC Selenga Ulan-Ude	0	(0)
2004–2007	FC Chita	85	(1)
2008	FC KUZBASS Kemerovo	27	(2)
2009	FC Mostovik-Primorye Ussuriysk (amateur)		
2010–2016	FC Chita	130	(6)
- * Club domestic league appearances and goals

Artyom Sergeyevich Drobyshev (Russian: Артём Серге́евич Дробышев; born 14 September 1980) is a former Russian professional football player.

== Club career ==
He played two seasons in the Russian Football National League for FC Lokomotiv Chita.
