= Sergei Kirsanov =

Russian footballer

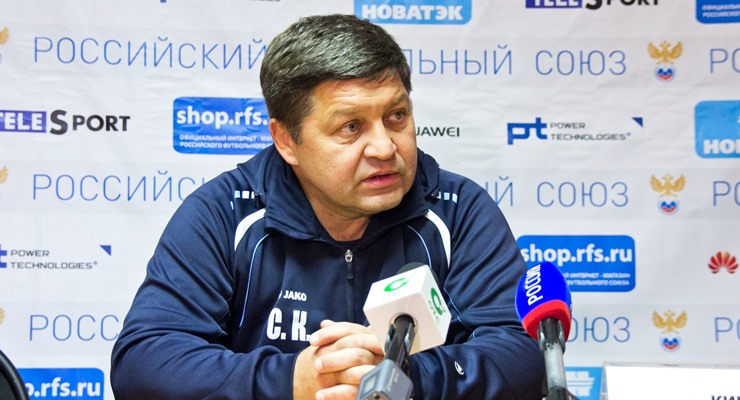

Personal information
- Full name: Sergei Stanislavovich Kirsanov
- Date of birth: 16 December 1961 (age 64)
- Place of birth: Novosibirsk, Russian SFSR, USSR
- Height: 1.70 m (5 ft 7 in)
- Positions: Forward; midfielder

Senior career*
Years	Team	Apps	(Gls)
1978–1979	Chkalovets Novosibirsk		
1982–1984	Angara Angarsk	70	(18)
1985	Zvezda Irkutsk	15	(1)
1986	Manometr Tomsk	26	(2)
1987–1988	Chkalovets Novosibirsk	45	(9)
1989	Dynamo Barnaul	8	(1)
1989	Luch Vladivostok	19	(4)
1990–1991	Angara Angarsk	30	(5)
1992	Agan Raduzhny	15	(5)
1993–1994	Metallurg Novokuznetsk	41	(3)
1995	Avtomobilist Novosibirsk		
2002	Chkalovets-Olimpik	8	(0)

Managerial career
- 2002: Chkalovets-Olimpik (assistant)
- 2004–2013: Sibir Novosibirsk (assistant)
- 2013: Sibir Novosibirsk (caretaker)
- 2013: Sibir Novosibirsk (assistant)
- 2013: Sibir Novosibirsk (caretaker)
- 2013–2014: Sibir Novosibirsk (assistant)
- 2014: Sibir Novosibirsk (caretaker)
- 2014–2015: Sibir Novosibirsk (assistant)
- 2015–2016: Sibir-2-M Novosibirsk
- 2016: Sibir Novosibirsk (assistant)
- 2016–2018: Sibir Novosibirsk
- 2020–2021: Novosibirsk
- * Club domestic league appearances and goals

Sergei Stanislavovich Kirsanov (Russian: Сергей Станиславович Кирсанов; born 16 December 1961) is a Russian football manager and a former player.
