= Viktor Karpukhin (footballer) =

Russian footballer

Personal information
- Full name: Viktor Anatolyevich Karpukhin
- Date of birth: 27 December 1989 (age 36)
- Place of birth: Orenburg, Russian SFSR
- Height: 1.83 m (6 ft 0 in)
- Position: Forward

Senior career*
Years	Team	Apps	(Gls)
2006–2011	FC Gazovik Orenburg	33	(3)
2010	→ FC Nosta Novotroitsk (loan)	25	(8)
2011–2012	FC Gornyak Uchaly	16	(2)
2012–2013	FC Nosta Novotroitsk	24	(2)
2013–2014	FC Oktan Perm	25	(4)
2014–2017	FC Nosta Novotroitsk	65	(22)
2017	FC Olimpiyets Nizhny Novgorod	16	(1)
2018	FC Syzran-2003	6	(4)
2018–2019	FC Murom	18	(5)
2019	FC Lada Dimitrovgrad	13	(3)
2020	FC Volga Ulyanovsk	13	(2)
- * Club domestic league appearances and goals

Viktor Anatolyevich Karpukhin (Russian: Виктор Анатольевич Карпухин; born 27 December 1989) is a Russian former professional football player.

== Club career ==
He made his Russian Football National League debut for FC Gazovik Orenburg on 4 April 2011 in a game against FC Chernomorets Novorossiysk.
