= FC Smolensk =

Russian football club

- Full name: Football Club Smolensk
- Founded: 2018; 8 years ago
- Ground: Spartak Stadium, Smolensk
- Capacity: 12,500
- Owner: Smolensk Oblast
- League: Russian Professional Football League, Group 2
Home colours	Away colours

FC Smolensk (Russian: ФК «Смоленск») is a Russian association football club based in Smolensk, playing at the Spartak Stadium. The club was established by the initiative of the Government of Smolensk Oblast.

== History ==
The club was founded in 2019 to replace FC Dnepr Smolensk, after Dnepr was relegated from the fourth-tier Russian Amateur Football League, at the end of 2018–19 season.

For the 2020–21 season, it was licensed for the third-tier Russian Professional Football League. On 2 August 2021, it dropped out of the league after the owner Vladimir Savchenkov issued an open letter stating that he cannot continue to finance the club.
