= Rustem Khuzin =

Russian footballer

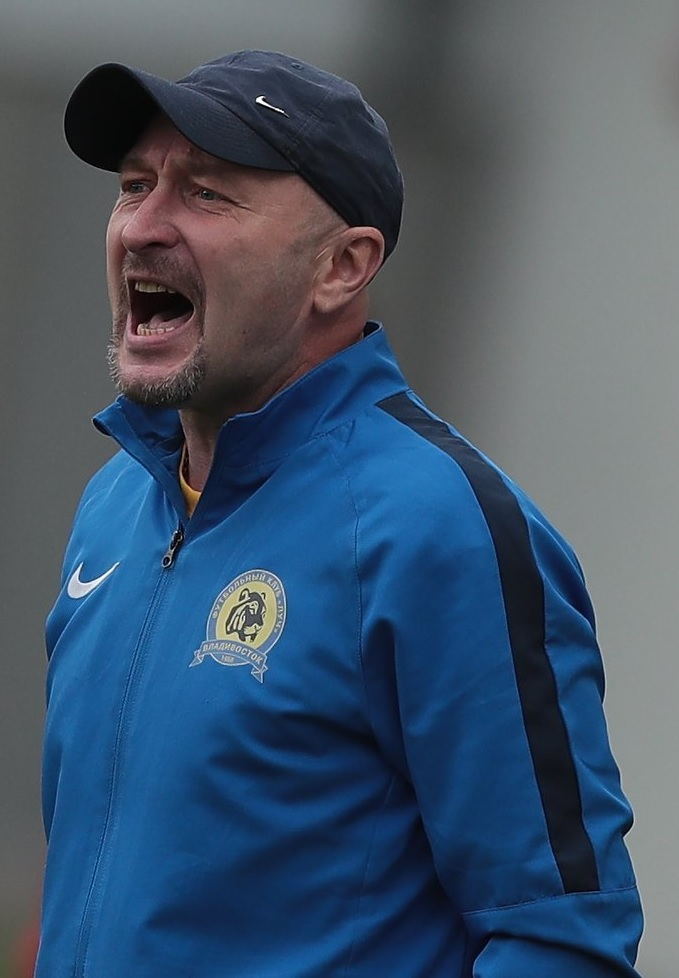
- Khuzin coaching Luch Vladivostok in 2019

Personal information
- Full name: Rustem Agzamovich Khuzin
- Date of birth: 30 January 1972 (age 54)
- Place of birth: Kazan, Russian SFSR
- Height: 1.76 m (5 ft 9 in)
- Positions: Defender; midfielder

Team information
- Current team: Rubin Kazan (academy director)

Youth career
- Priborist Kazan

Senior career*
Years	Team	Apps	(Gls)
1988–1993	Rubin Kazan	163	(8)
1994	Rotor Volgograd	15	(0)
1995–1996	Lada Dimitrovgrad	63	(0)
1997–1999	Rubin Kazan	68	(1)
2000–2004	Amkar Perm	152	(0)
2005–2006	Rubin Kazan	7	(0)

Managerial career
- 2007: Rubin Kazan (assistant)
- 2007–2008: Rubin-2 Kazan
- 2009–2012: Amkar Perm (reserves)
- 2012–2013: Amkar Perm (caretaker)
- 2013–2014: Neftekhimik Nizhnekamsk
- 2015–2016: Neftekhimik Nizhnekamsk
- 2017: Lada-Tolyatti
- 2018–2019: Luch Vladivostok
- 2020–2021: Zvezda Perm
- 2021–2023: Amkar Perm
- 2023–: Rubin Kazan (academy director)
- * Club domestic league appearances and goals

Rustem Agzamovich Khuzin (Tatar: Рөстәм Әгъзам улы Хуҗин, romanized: Röstäm Äğzäm ulı Xucin, Russian: Рустем Агзамович Хузин; born 30 January 1972) is a Russian professional football coach and a former player. He works as a development director at the academy of Rubin Kazan.

== Playing career ==
He made his professional debut in the Soviet Second League in 1988 for Rubin Kazan. He played 1 game in the UEFA Cup 1994–95 for Rotor Volgograd.

== Honours ==
- Russian Cup finalist: 1995 (played in the early stages of the 1994/95 tournament for Rotor Volgograd).
- Russian Professional Football League Zone Ural-Povolzhye Best Manager: 2015–16.
