= Aleksandr Tochilin =

Russian footballer

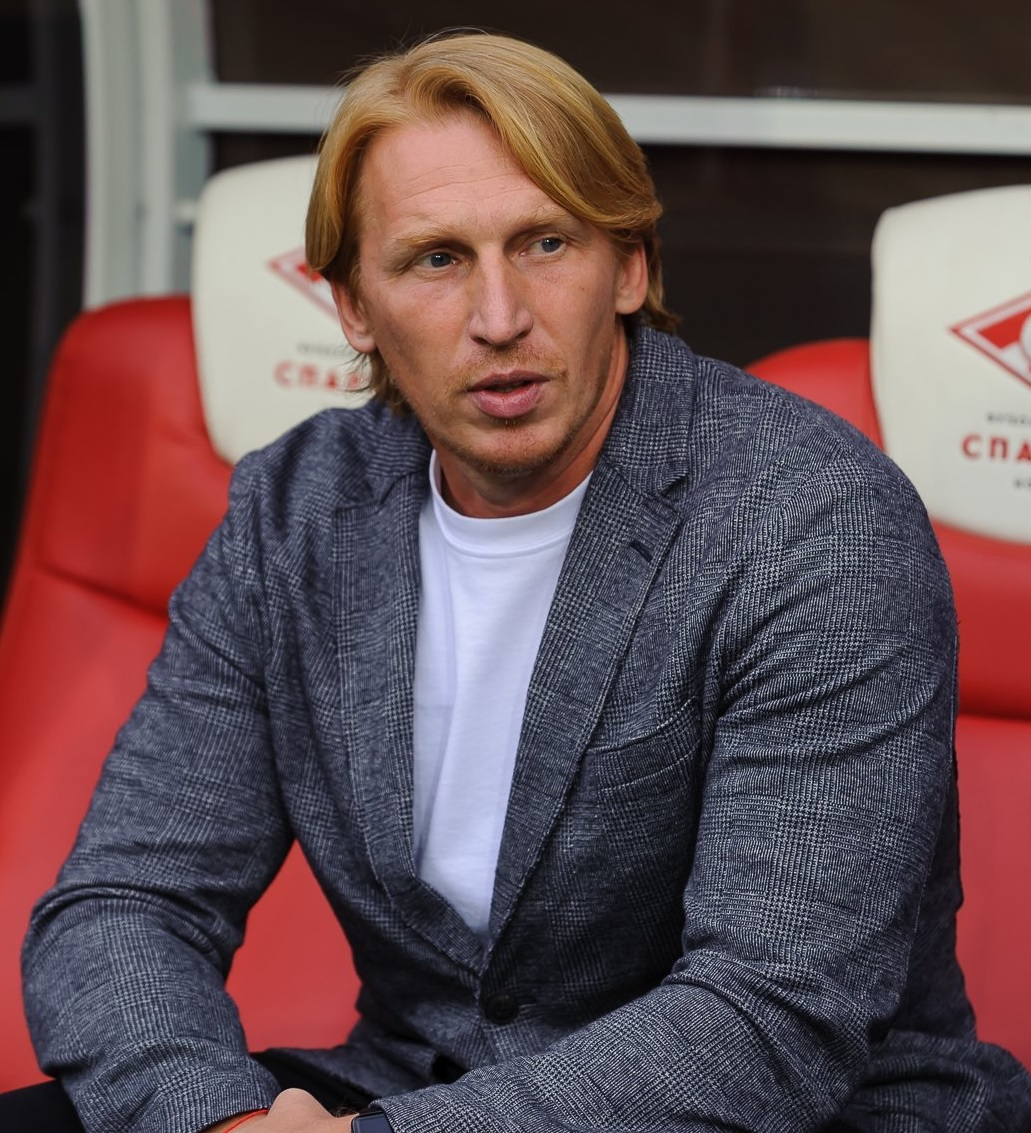
- Tochilin coaching PFC Sochi in 2019

Personal information
- Full name: Aleksandr Vasilyevich Tochilin
- Date of birth: 27 April 1974 (age 52)
- Place of birth: Moscow, Soviet Union
- Height: 1.76 m (5 ft 9 in)
- Positions: Centre-back; right back

Youth career
- SDYuSShOR-76 Timiryazevets Moscow

Senior career*
Years	Team	Apps	(Gls)
1992–1994	Asmaral Moscow	11	(0)
1992–1994	Asmaral-d Moscow	82	(1)
1995–1998	Dynamo-d Moscow	43	(3)
1995–2008	Dynamo Moscow	239	(7)

International career
2003	Russia	1	(0)

Managerial career
- 2009–2015: Dynamo Moscow (youth team)
- 2015–2018: Dynamo St. Petersburg
- 2018–2019: Sochi
- 2021: Olimp-Dolgoprudny
- 2021: Kuban Krasnodar
- 2022: Olimp-Dolgoprudny
- 2022–2023: Sochi (assistant)
- 2023: Sochi
- * Club domestic league appearances and goals

Aleksandr Vasilyevich Tochilin (Russian: Александр Васильевич Точилин; born 27 April 1974) is a Russian football coach and a former player who played the most of his career for Dynamo Moscow and once represented Russia.

== International career ==
He played his only game for Russia national football team on 29 March 2003 in the UEFA Euro 2004 qualifier against Albania which Russia disappointingly lost 1–3. Tochilin was substituted at halftime.

== European club competitions ==
With Dynamo Moscow.

- UEFA Cup 1996–97: 2 games.
- UEFA Intertoto Cup 1997: 6 games.
- UEFA Cup 1998–99: 2 games.
- UEFA Cup 2000–01: 2 games.
- UEFA Cup 2001–02: 3 games.

== Coaching career ==
He led Sochi to the Russian Premier League for the first time ever for the 2019–20 season, but was dismissed on 20 November 2019 with 1 point in last 5 league games and the team in last place in the table.

In January 2021, he was hired by third-tier PFL club Olimp-Dolgoprudny and led them to promotion to the second tier at the end of the 2020–21 season. He left Olimp-Dolgoprudny after the conclusion of the season.

On 19 August 2021, he joined second-tier club Kuban Krasnodar. On 12 October 2021, he left Kuban by mutual consent as the team lost 9 out of 11 games under his helm.

On 8 February 2022, Tochilin returned to Olimp-Dolgoprudny.

On 17 September 2023, Tochilin was appointed manager of Sochi once again. He was dismissed by Sochi on 3 December 2023, with the club in last place in the standings.

== Honours ==
=== Player ===
- Russian Premier League bronze: 1997, 2008.
- Russian Cup winner: 1995.
- Russian Cup finalist: 1997, 1999.

=== Coach ===
- Russian Professional Football League Zone West best coach: 2016–17.
- Russian Football National League runner-up with PFC Sochi: 2018–19 (Sochi promoted to the Russian Premier League for the first time ever).
