= Denis Sinyayev =

Russian footballer

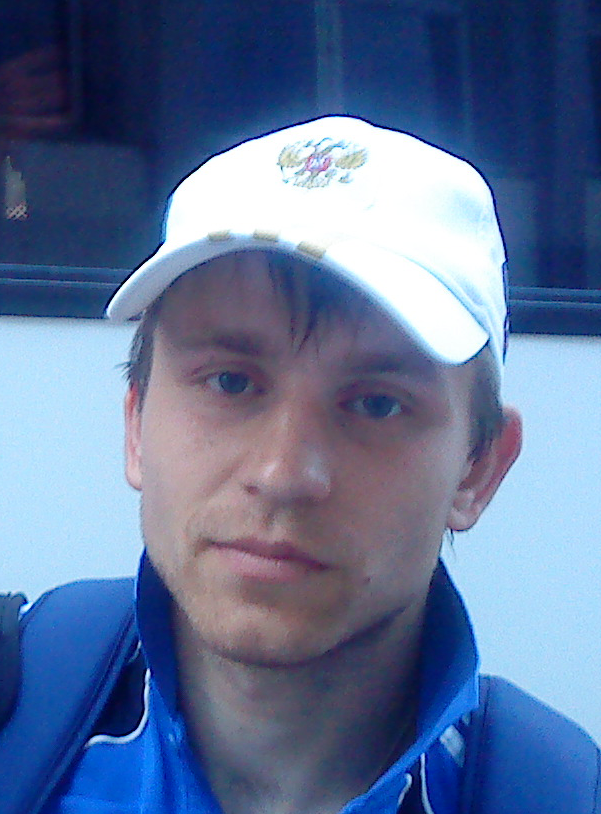

Personal information
- Full name: Denis Petrovich Sinyayev
- Date of birth: 13 October 1984 (age 42)
- Place of birth: Kursk, Russian SFSR, Soviet Union
- Height: 1.78 m (5 ft 10 in)
- Position: Midfielder

Youth career
- Kurskrezinotekhnika Kursk

Senior career*
Years	Team	Apps	(Gls)
2003–2022	FC Avangard Kursk	477	(52)
- * Club domestic league appearances and goals

Denis Petrovich Sinyayev (Russian: Денис Петрович Синяев; born 13 October 1984) is a Russian former professional football player.

== Club career ==
He made his Russian Football National League debut for FC Avangard Kursk on 19 April 2005 in a game against FC Dynamo Makhachkala.
