= Vladimir Shcherbak (footballer, born 1970) =

Russian association football player

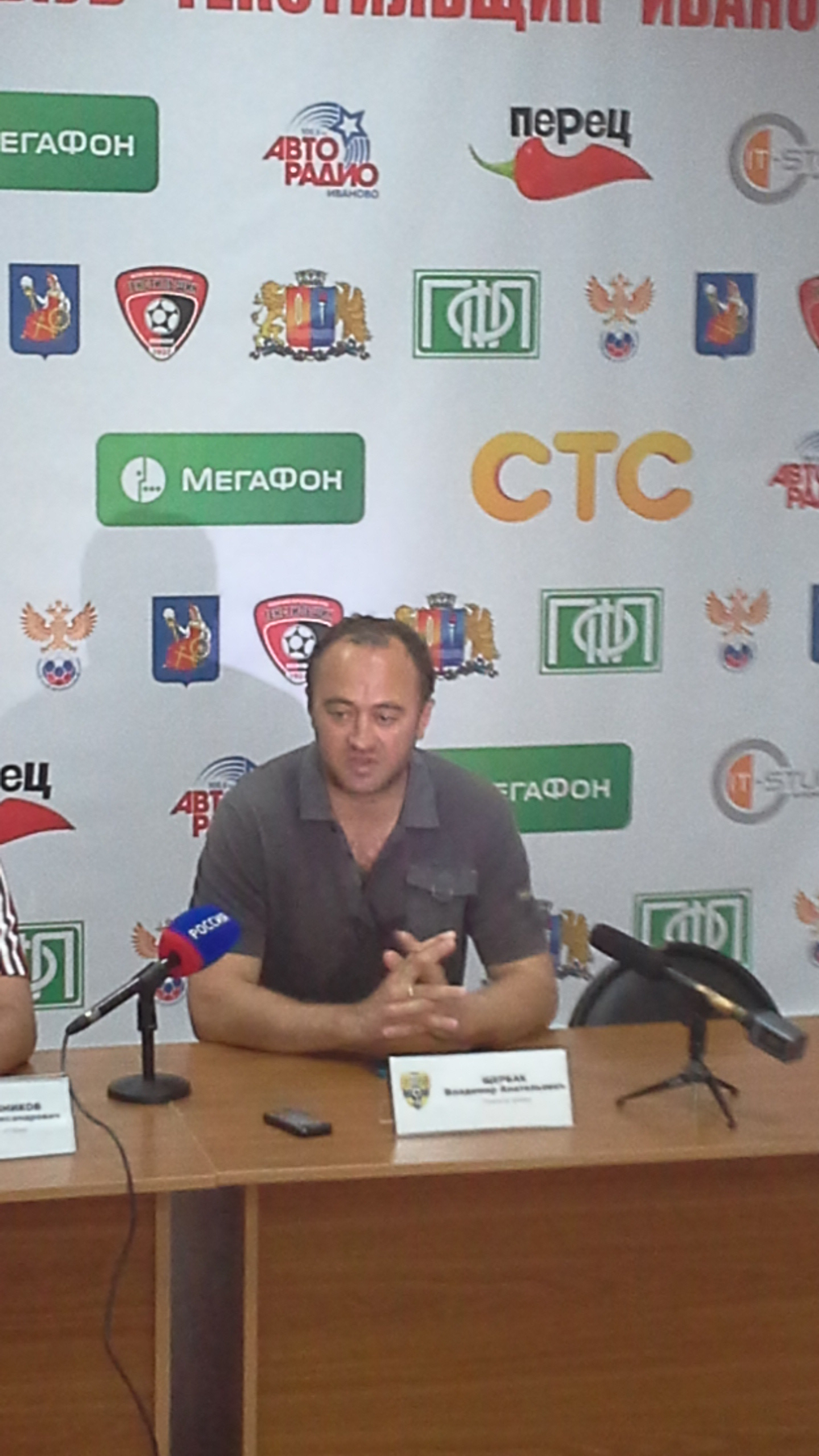
- Shcherbak in 2014

Personal information
- Full name: Vladimir Anatolyevich Shcherbak
- Date of birth: 26 January 1970 (age 56)
- Height: 1.83 m (6 ft 0 in)
- Position: Defender

Team information
- Current team: Strogino Moscow (assistant manager)

Youth career
- FC Molniya Omsk

Senior career*
Years	Team	Apps	(Gls)
1988	FC Irtysh Omsk	1	(0)
1990–1991	FC Irtysh Omsk	39	(0)
1992	FC Metallist Petropavlovsk	17	(2)
1993	FC Dynamo Omsk	22	(2)
1994	FC Shakhtyor Kiselyovsk	18	(0)
1995–1998	FC Irtysh Omsk	40	(1)
2000–2002	FC Molniya Omsk		

Managerial career
- 2006–2007: FC Krylia Sovetov-SOK Dimitrovgrad (assistant)
- 2008: FC Togliatti (assistant)
- 2010: PFC Krylia Sovetov Samara (director of youth development)
- 2014–2016: FC Strogino Moscow
- 2017: FC Tosno (assistant)
- 2018–2021: ShOR-63 Smena Moscow
- 2021–2022: FC Chertanovo Moscow
- 2022: FC Tekstilshchik Ivanovo (caretaker)
- 2022–2024: FC Tekstilshchik Ivanovo (assistant)
- 2024: FC Lada-Tolyatti
- 2025–2026: FC Irtysh Omsk
- 2026–: Strogino Moscow (assistant)
- * Club domestic league appearances and goals

Vladimir Anatolyevich Shcherbak (Russian: Владимир Анатольевич Щербак; born 26 January 1970) is a Russian football manager and a former player who is an assistant coach with Strogino Moscow.

== Personal life ==
He is the father of Denis Shcherbak.
