= Eduard Sarkisov =

Russian footballer (born 1971)

Personal information
- Full name: Eduard Rachikovich Sarkisov
- Date of birth: 5 April 1971 (age 55)
- Place of birth: Novorossiysk, Russian SFSR
- Height: 1.76 m (5 ft 9 in)
- Position: Midfielder

Team information
- Current team: FC Chernomorets Novorossiysk (caretaker manager)

Youth career
- –1987: DYuSSh Tsement Novorossiysk
- 1987–1989: Luhansk sports boarding school

Senior career*
Years	Team	Apps	(Gls)
1989	FC Zorya Luhansk	0	(0)
1989	FC Tsement Novorossiysk	9	(0)
1990–1991	FC Ararat Yerevan	19	(0)
1992–1995	FC Chernomorets Novorossiysk	139	(21)
1996–1998	FC Kuban Krasnodar	110	(12)
1998–1999	FC Prykarpattya Ivano-Frankivsk	13	(0)
2000	FC Zhemchuzhina Sochi	21	(0)

Managerial career
- 2006: FC Chernomorets Novorossiysk (assistant)
- 2006: FC Chernomorets Novorossiysk
- 2007: FC Spartak-UGP Anapa
- 2009: FC Chernomorets Novorossiysk (assistant)
- 2009: FC Chernomorets Novorossiysk (caretaker)
- 2011–2013: FC Slavyansky Slavyansk-na-Kubani
- 2013–2015: FC Vityaz Krymsk
- 2015–2017: FC Chernomorets Novorossiysk
- 2019–2022: FC Chernomorets Novorossiysk
- 2022: FC Chernomorets Novorossiysk (assistant)
- 2022–2023: FC Kuban-Holding Pavlovskaya
- 2023–2025: FC Forte Taganrog
- 2025: FC Chernomorets Novorossiysk (assistant)
- 2025: FC Chernomorets Novorossiysk (caretaker)
- 2025–2026: FC Chernomorets Novorossiysk (assistant)
- 2026–: FC Chernomorets Novorossiysk (caretaker)
- * Club domestic league appearances and goals

Eduard Rachikovich Sarkisov (Russian: Эдуард Рачикович Саркисов; born 5 April 1971) is a Russian professional football coach and a former player who is the caretaker manager of Chernomorets Novorossiysk.

== International career ==
While being a Russian citizen, Sarkisov was a prospect to join the Armenia national football team.

== Personal life ==
Sarkisov was born to an ethnic Armenian family. In 1999 Sarkisov was married, and in summer of 1994, he had a son, Eduard. His wife and son also live in Novorossiysk.
