= DYuSSh Arsenal Stadium =

Sports venue in Russia

DYuSSh Arsenal
- Interactive map of DYuSSh Arsenal
- Full name: Stadion DYuSSh Arsenal
- Location: Kosaya Gora; Russia
- Owner: FC Arsenal-2 Tula
- Operator: FC Arsenal-2 Tula
- Capacity: 1000
- Surface: Grass

Stadion DYuSSh Arsenal is the home ground of Russian Professional Football League farm club FC Arsenal-2 Tula. The infrastructure has a maximum capacity of 1000.
