= Sergei Bondar =

Russian footballer and coach (born 1963)

Personal information
- Full name: Sergei Ivanovich Bondar
- Date of birth: 5 May 1963 (age 63)
- Place of birth: Rubizhne, Ukrainian SSR
- Height: 1.86 m (6 ft 1 in)
- Position: Defender

Team information
- Current team: FC Spartak Kostroma (assistant manager)

Senior career*
Years	Team	Apps	(Gls)
1991–1994	FC Znamya Truda Orekhovo-Zuyevo	148	(2)
1996–1997	FC Kosmos Dolgoprudny	39	(0)

Managerial career
- 1995: GFC Orekhovo Orekhovo-Zuyevo
- 1997: FC Spartak Lukhovitsy
- 1999–2001: FC Kosmos Elektrostal (director)
- 2002–2003: FC Kosmos Yegoryevsk
- 2004: FC Saturn Yegoryevsk (technical director)
- 2004–2005: FC Saturn Yegoryevsk (director)
- 2007–2009: FC Znamya Truda Orekhovo-Zuyevo
- 2009–2010: FC Saturn Moscow Oblast (sports director)
- 2010: FC Saturn-2 Moscow Oblast (general director)
- 2010: FC Saturn-2 Moscow Oblast
- 2011: FC Saturn-2 Moscow Oblast (president)
- 2012: FC Saturn Moscow Oblast
- 2015–2016: FC Znamya Truda Orekhovo-Zuyevo
- 2022: FC Saturn-2 Moscow Oblast
- 2022–2024: FC Znamya Truda Orekhovo-Zuyevo (general director)
- 2024: FC Spartak Kostroma
- 2025–: FC Spartak Kostroma (assistant)
- * Club domestic league appearances and goals

Sergei Ivanovich Bondar (Russian: Серге́й Иванович Бондарь; born 5 May 1963) is a Russian professional football coach and a former player. He is the assistant manager of FC Spartak Kostroma.

As a player, he made his debut in the Soviet Second League in 1991 for FC Znamya Truda Orekhovo-Zuyevo.
