= Sergei Sedyshev =

Russian professional football coach (born 1963)

Personal information
- Full name: Sergei Viktorovich Sedyshev
- Date of birth: 25 January 1963 (age 63)

Team information
- Current team: FC Volga Ulyanovsk (manager)

Managerial career
- Years: Team
- 1995–1996: FC Volga Ulyanovsk
- 1997–1998: FC Volga Ulyanovsk (assistant)
- 1999–2004: FC Volga Ulyanovsk
- 2005: FC Lada-SOK Dimitrovgrad
- 2007–2010: FC Volga Ulyanovsk
- 2010–2013: FC Volga Ulyanovsk (sport director)
- 2013–2019: FC Volga Ulyanovsk

Sergei Viktorovich Sedyshev (Russian: Серге́й Викторович Седышев; born 25 January 1963) is a Russian professional football coach.
