= Ilya Makiyenko =

Russian footballer and coach

Personal information
- Full name: Ilya Vladimirovich Makiyenko
- Date of birth: 23 January 1971 (age 55)
- Place of birth: Komsomolsk-on-Amur, Khabarovsk Krai, Russian SFSR
- Height: 1.72 m (5 ft 7 1/2 in)
- Position: Midfielder

Team information
- Current team: FC Chita (assistant manager)

Senior career*
| Years | Team | Apps | (Gls) |
| 1988 | FC Amur Komsomolsk-na-Amure | 17 | (0) |
| 1989–1993 | FC SKA Khabarovsk | 143 | (10) |
| 1994–1996 | FC Luch Vladivostok | 107 | (7) |
| 1997–2008 | FC Chita | 391 | (51) |

Managerial career
- 2010–2013: FC Chita (assistant)
- 2013–2016: FC Chita
- 2016–2017: FC Chita (assistant)
- 2018–2019: FC Chita
- 2019–: FC Chita (assistant)
- * Club domestic league appearances and goals

Ilya Vladimirovich Makiyenko (Russian: Илья Владимирович Макиенко; born 23 January 1971) is a Russian professional football coach and a former player. He is the assistant manager of FC Chita.
