= Oleg Yakovlev (footballer, born 1970) =

Russian footballer and manager

Personal information
- Full name: Oleg Ivanovich Yakovlev
- Date of birth: 5 July 1970 (age 56)
- Place of birth: Irkutsk, Russian SFSR
- Height: 1.85 m (6 ft 1 in)
- Position: Defender

Senior career*
Years	Team	Apps	(Gls)
1991–2006	FC Zvezda Irkutsk	376	(41)

Managerial career
- 2007–2008: FC Zvezda Irkutsk (assistant)
- 2008: FC Zvezda Irkutsk (caretaker)
- 2010–2013: FC Baikal Irkutsk
- 2015–2016: FC Dynamo Barnaul
- 2016–2021: FC Zenit Irkutsk
- 2022–2023: FC Dynamo Barnaul
- * Club domestic league appearances and goals

Oleg Ivanovich Yakovlev (Russian: Олег Иванович Яковлев; born 5 July 1970) is a Russian professional football manager and a former player.

Yakovlev played in the Russian First League with FC Zvezda Irkutsk.
