= Torpedo Stadium (Tolyatti) =

Sports venue in Tolyatti, Russia

Coordinates: 53°30′15″N 49°16′1″E

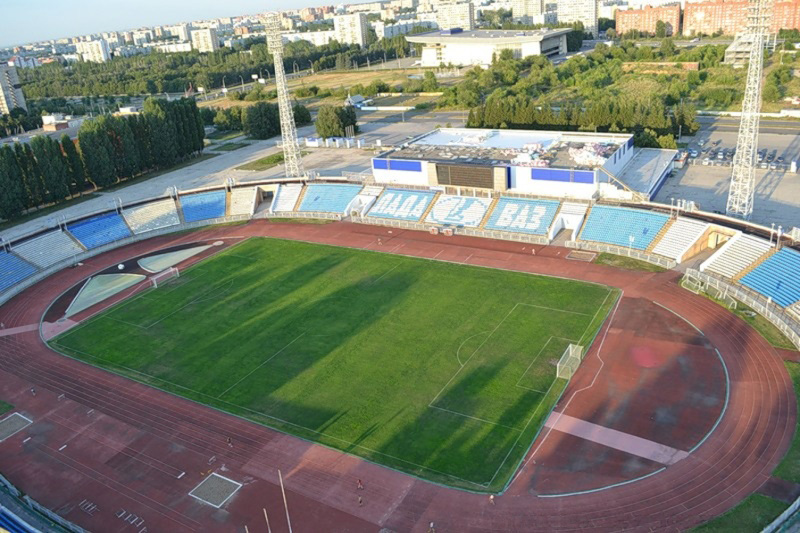

Torpedo Stadium is a multi-use stadium in Tolyatti, Russia. It is currently used mostly for football matches and is the home ground of FC Lada Togliatti. The stadium holds 18,000 people.
