= Yevgeni Pesegov =

Russian footballer

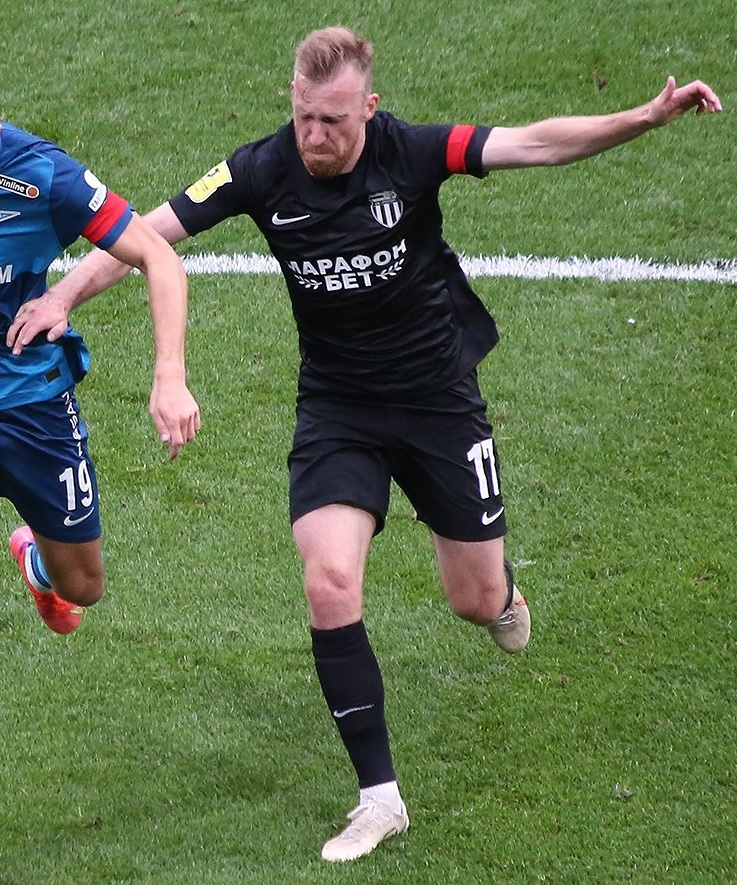
- Pesegov with Rotor Volgograd in 2021

Personal information
- Full name: Yevgeni Valentinovich Pesegov
- Date of birth: 21 February 1989 (age 37)
- Place of birth: Krasnoyarsk, USSR
- Height: 1.77 m (5 ft 10 in)
- Position: Central midfielder

Youth career
- –2003: DYuSSh Yunost Krasnoyarsk
- 2004–2006: Konoplyov football academy

Senior career*
Years	Team	Apps	(Gls)
2006–2007	Krylia Sovetov-SOK Dimitrovgrad	40	(4)
2008	Tolyatti	30	(10)
2009–2010	Krylia Sovetov Samara	3	(0)
2010	→ Nizhny Novgorod (loan)	9	(0)
2010	→ Gazovik Orenburg (loan)	8	(0)
2011	Volgar-Gazprom Astrakhan	7	(0)
2011	Akademiya Tolyatti	10	(0)
2012–2013	Syzran-2003	24	(3)
2013	Khimki	8	(0)
2013	Tyumen	14	(1)
2014	Zenit Penza	27	(4)
2015	Lokomotiv Liski	9	(1)
2015–2018	Dynamo St. Petersburg	83	(14)
2018–2019	Sochi	38	(10)
2019–2021	Rotor Volgograd	40	(0)
2021–2024	Akron Tolyatti	61	(2)
2024–2025	Leningradets	30	(5)

International career
2006	Russia U-17	8	(0)
2008	Russia U-19	6	(1)
2009	Russia U-20	8	(2)
2009	Russia U-21	1	(0)
- * Club domestic league appearances and goals as of 14 June 2025

Yevgeni Valentinovich Pesegov (Russian: Евгений Валентинович Песегов; born 21 February 1989) is a Russian former professional footballer.

== Club career ==
Pesegov made his professional debut in the Russian Second Division in 2006 for Krylia Sovetov-SOK Dimitrovgrad.

He made his Russian Premier League debut for Krylia Sovetov Samara on 30 October 2009 in a game against Rubin Kazan.

On 2 September 2019, Pesegov moved from Sochi to Rotor Volgograd.
