= Valery Zazdravnykh =

Russian footballer

Personal information
- Full name: Valery Petrovich Zazdravnykh
- Date of birth: 8 July 1963 (age 63)
- Place of birth: Novoalexandrovskaya, Russian SFSR
- Height: 1.73 m (5 ft 8 in)
- Positions: Midfielder; forward

Senior career*
| Years | Team | Apps | (Gls) |
| 1981–1988 | Dynamo Stavropol | 198 | (23) |
| 1989 | Pamir Dushanbe | 27 | (2) |
| 1990 | Rotor Volgograd | 15 | (0) |
| 1991 | Tsement Novorossiysk | 38 | (11) |
| 1992 | Tekstilshchik Kamyshin | 27 | (3) |
| 1993 | Progress Frankfurt | | |
| 1993 | Lada Togliatti | 17 | (2) |
| 1993 | Tekstilshchik Kamyshin | 2 | (0) |
| 1994–1995 | Dynamo Stavropol | 38 | (4) |
| 1996 | Neftekhimik Nizhnekamsk | 7 | (0) |

Managerial career
- 2005–2006: Dynamo Makhachkala (assistant)
- 2006: Dynamo Makhachkala (caretaker)
- 2008: Dynamo Stavropol (assistant)
- 2009: FC Stavropolye-2009
- 2009–2010: Nosta Novotroitsk (assistant)
- 2011: Mashuk-KMV Pyatigorsk (assistant)
- 2011–2012: Mashuk-KMV Pyatigorsk
- 2013: Gazprom transgaz Stavropol Ryzdvyany (director)
- 2013–2014: Gazprom transgaz Stavropol Ryzdvyany
- 2014–2015: Dynamo GTS Stavropol
- 2015–2016: Dynamo Stavropol
- 2016: Angusht Nazran
- 2016–2019: Mashuk-KMV Pyatigorsk
- 2019–2020: Inter Cherkessk
- 2021: Yessentuki
- 2023–2024: SKA Rostov-on-Don
- * Club domestic league appearances and goals

Valery Petrovich Zazdravnykh (Russian: Валерий Петрович Заздравных; born 8 July 1963) is a Russian professional football coach and a former player.

== Club career ==
As a player, he made his debut in the Soviet First League in 1981 for FC Dynamo Stavropol.
