= Trudovye Rezervy Stadium (Kursk) =

Sports venue in Kursk, Russia

Trudovye Rezervy
- Трудовые Резервы
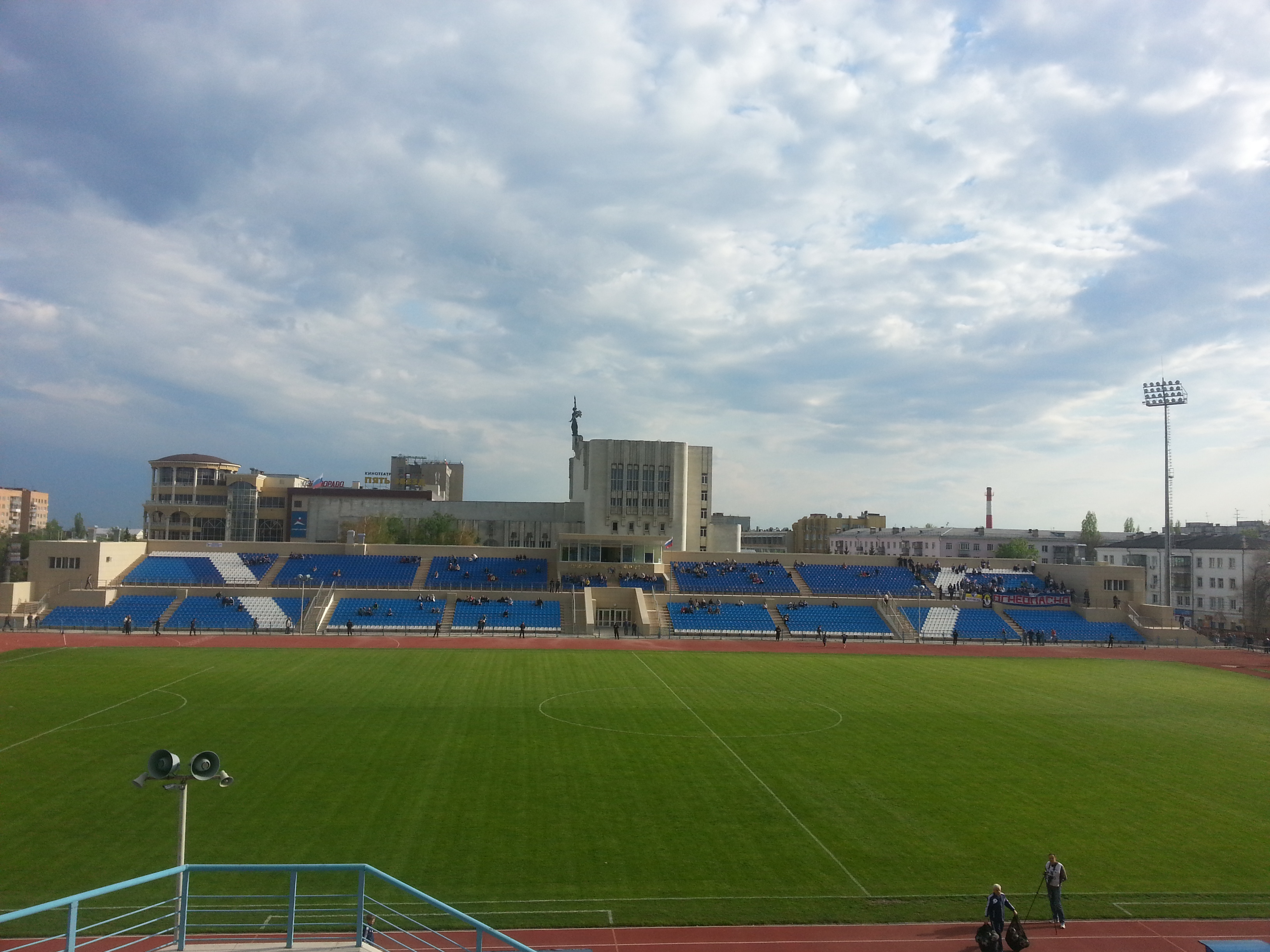
- south tribune
- Interactive map of Trudovye Rezervy
- Address: Lenina Street, 58
- Location: Kursk, Russia
- Coordinates: 51°44′25.37″N 36°11′29.94″E
- Capacity: 11 329
- Surface: grass

Trudovye Rezervy Stadium is a multi-use stadium in Kursk, Russia. It seats 11,329 people.

The stadium was constructed from 1948 to 1963, initially accommodated 10,000 spectators and featured North and South stands. A major reconstruction took place between 1988 and 1992, increasing the capacity to 11,329 seats. The stadium was in disrepair for a long period due to federal ownership. It was fully transferred to the Kursk region in 2006, leading to renewed investment.

In 2008, the stadium underwent further modernization, including improved lighting, electronic scoreboards, and comfortable seating. The field boasts high-quality natural grass suitable even for winter play. The stands are divided into sections, including a dedicated area for children. Throughout its history, the "Trudovye Rezervy" stadium has hosted significant football events.
