= Igor Belyayev =

Russian footballer and coach

Personal information
- Full name: Igor Aleksandrovich Belyayev
- Date of birth: 30 August 1975 (age 51)
- Place of birth: Kursk, Russian SFSR, Soviet Union
- Height: 1.79 m (5 ft 10 in)
- Position: Midfielder

Team information
- Current team: Amkar Perm (manager)

Youth career
- DYuSSh APZ-20 Kursk

Senior career*
Years	Team	Apps	(Gls)
1995	GFK-Rubikon Kursk		
1996–2005	Avangard Kursk	252	(15)

Managerial career
- 2007–2012: Avangard Kursk
- 2013–2014: Avangard Kursk (assistant)
- 2014: Avangard Kursk
- 2014: Avangard Kursk (assistant)
- 2014–2017: Avangard Kursk
- 2017–2018: Avangard Kursk (assistant)
- 2018–2019: Avangard Kursk
- 2019–2021: Avangard Kursk
- 2023–2026: Avangard Kursk
- 2026–: Amkar Perm
- * Club domestic league appearances and goals

Igor Aleksandrovich Belyayev (Russian: Игорь Александрович Беляев; born 30 August 1975) is a Russian professional football coach and a former player. He is the manager of Amkar Perm.
