= FC Kristall Smolensk =

- Full name: Football Club Kristall Smolensk
- Founded: 1992; 34 years ago
- Dissolved: 2004; 22 years ago
- Ground: Spartak Stadium, Smolensk
- Capacity: 12,500
- League: Russian First Division
- 2003: 20th
Home colours	Away colours

FC Kristall Smolensk (Russian: «Кристалл» (Смоленск)) was a Russian football team from Smolensk. It played professionally from 1993 to 2003. They played on the second-highest level in the Russian First Division from 1997 to 2003, where their best result was 4th place in 1998. In 2004 a new club was founded in Smolensk, called FC Dnepr Smolensk.

== Team name history ==
- 1992: FC SKD Smolensk
- 1993–1994: FC Kristall Smolensk
- 1995–1998: FC CSK VVS-Kristall Smolensk
- 1998–2004: FC Kristall Smolensk
