= FC Dnepr Smolensk =

- Full name: Football Club Dnepr Smolensk
- Founded: 2004
- Ground: Spartak Stadium
- Capacity: 12,500
- Owner: Smolensk/Smolensk Oblast
- Chairman: Alexey Safronov
- Manager: Sergei Gunko
- League: Russian Professional Football League, Zone West
- 2018–19: 13th
- Website: https://fc-dnepr.ru/
Home colours	Away colours	Third colours

Historical logo of predecessor side FC Smolensk

FC Dnepr Smolensk (Russian: ФК «Днепр» Смоленск) is an association football club from Smolensk, Russia, founded in 2004 and dissolved in 2019. Another Smolensk team, FC Kristall Smolensk, was dissolved in early 2004. It played in the Russian Professional Football League from 2005 to 2007 and then again from 2009 to 2019.

== Club name history ==
- 2004–2008: FC Smolensk
- 2008–2016: FC Dnepr Smolensk
- 2016–2018: SFC CRFSO Smolensk SFC stands for "Sport-Football Club" and CRFSO stands for "Center of Football Development of Smolensk Oblast" (Russian: Центр развития футбола Смоленской области).
- 2018–2019 : FC Dnepr Smolensk

On 26 March 2019, the PFL announced that the club dropped out of competition voluntarily, due to lack of financing.

On 22 March 2022 announced the revival of the club.
