= 1992 Russian First League =

Russian First League
- Season: 1992

The 1992 Russian First League was the 1st edition of Russian First Division. There were 3 zones with 52 teams in total.

== West ==
=== Overview ===
Team	1991 league and position	Head coach
FC Zhemchuzhina-Amerus Enterprises Sochi	Soviet Second League B, Zone 4, 1st (as FC Zhemchuzhina Sochi)	Arsen Naydyonov
FC Uralan Elista	Soviet Second League B, Zone 4, 2nd	Arnold Lendengolts
FC Gekris Novorossiysk	Soviet Second League, Center, 13th (as FC Tsement Novorossiysk)	Oleg Dolmatov
FC Druzhba Maykop	Soviet Second League, Center, 15th	Nurbiy Khakunov
FC Terek Grozny	Soviet Second League, Center, 5th	Khaydar Alkhanov
FC Dynamo Vologda	Soviet Second League B, Zone 6, 4th	Leon Agubyants
FC Metallurg Lipetsk	Soviet Second League, Center, 4th	Aleksandr Ignatenko
PFC Spartak Nalchik	Soviet Second League, West, 17th	Kazbek Tlyarugov
FC Spartak Anapa	Soviet Second League B, Zone 5, 1st	Akop Kalandzhan
FC Torpedo Vladimir	Soviet Second League, Center, 3rd	Yuri Pyanov
FC Asmaral Kislovodsk	Soviet Second League B, Zone 4, 3rd (as FC Narzan Kislodovsk)	Gennadi Sarychev (until July); Eduard Malofeyev (from July)
FC Torpedo Taganrog	Soviet Second League, West, 6th	Valeri Volodin (until July); Anatoly Bulgakov (from August)
FC Nart Cherkessk	Soviet Second League, Center, 17th	Leonid Shlyak
FC APK Azov	Soviet Second League, Center, 16th	Aleksandr Irkhin (until July); Vladimir Inyutin (from September)
FC Tekstilshchik Ivanovo	Soviet Second League B, Zone 6, 2nd	Vladimir Belkov
FC Energomash Belgorod	Soviet Second League B, Zone 5, 4th	Viktor Prokhorov
FC Prometey-Dynamo St. Petersburg	Soviet Second League B, Zone 6, 1st	Vladimir Pronin (until May); Vladimir Goncharov (from June)
FC Trion-Volga Tver	Soviet Second League, Center, 20th (as FC Volga Tver)	Viktor Arzhanykh (until August); Boris Zhuravlyov (from September)

=== Standings ===
Pos	Team	Pld	W	D	L	GF	GA	GD	Pts	Promotion or relegation
1	Zhemchuzhina-Amerus Enterprises Sochi (P)	34	24	5	5	84	40	+44	53	Promotion to Top League
2	Uralan Elista	34	19	5	10	65	49	+16	43	
3	Gekris Novorossiysk	34	18	7	9	63	35	+28	43	
4	Druzhba Maykop	34	17	8	9	57	42	+15	42	
5	Terek Grozny	34	18	5	11	63	43	+20	41	
6	Dynamo Vologda	34	15	7	12	51	43	+8	37	
7	Metallurg Lipetsk	34	14	8	12	49	41	+8	36	
8	Spartak Nalchik	34	16	3	15	58	47	+11	35	
9	Spartak Anapa	34	14	7	13	49	47	+2	35	
10	Torpedo Vladimir	34	12	9	13	53	53	0	33	
11	Asmaral Kislovodsk	34	12	7	15	37	50	−13	31	
12	Torpedo Taganrog	34	12	6	16	47	39	+8	30	
13	Nart Cherkessk	34	11	8	15	37	55	−18	30	
14	APK Azov	34	11	6	17	37	60	−23	28	
15	Tekstilshchik Ivanovo	34	10	8	16	58	57	+1	28	
16	Energomash Belgorod (R)	34	8	11	15	44	68	−24	27	Relegation to Second League
17	Prometey-Dynamo St. Petersburg (R)	34	6	9	19	36	65	−29	21	Relegation to Second League
18	Trion-Volga Tver (R)	34	7	5	22	31	85	−54	19	Relegation to Second League

Source: RSSSF
(P) Promoted; (R) Relegated

=== Top goalscorers ===
Rank	Player	Team	Goals
1	(Georgia (country)) Gocha Gogrichiani	Zhemchuzhina-Amerus	26
2	(Russia) Eduard Kugotov	Spartak (Nch)	19
3	(Russia) Nikolai Sukhov	Torpedo (Vl)	17
4	(Russia) Konstantin Kamnev	Terek	16
5	(Russia) Artur Shamrin	Metallurg (Lp)	14
6	(Russia) Yuri Bobryshev	Uralan	13
6	(Russia) Yuri Krivolapov	Tekstilshchik	13
6	(Russia) Yevgeni Saprykin	Spartak (An)	13
6	(Russia) Igor Tikhonov	Tekstilshchik	13
10	(Russia) Valeri Popov	Torpedo (Tg)	12

== Center ==
=== Overview ===
Team	1991 league and position	Head coach
FC KAMAZ Naberezhnye Chelny	Soviet Second League, Center, 10th	Valeri Chetverik
FC Torpedo Ryazan	Soviet Second League, Center, 12th	Sergei Nedosekin
FC Zvezda Perm	Soviet Second League, Center, 14th	Viktor Slesarev
FC Torpedo Volzhsky	Soviet Second League, Center, 7th	Oleg Dudarin
FC Rubin-TAN Kazan	Soviet Second League B, Zone 7, 1st (as FC Rubin Kazan)	Aleksandr Ivchenko (until August)
FC Lada Togliatti	Soviet Second League, Center, 6th	Anatoli Tyryatkin (until August); Vladimir Yevsyukov (from September)
FC Sokol Saratov	Soviet Second League, Center, 8th	Aleksandr Koreshkov
FC Uralets Nizhny Tagil	Soviet Second League B, Zone 7, 3rd	Viktor Konshin
FC Torpedo Miass	Soviet Second League B, Zone 7, 4th	Vladimir Khitrin
FC Zenit Izhevsk	Soviet Second League, Center, 9th	Valeri Salnikov
FC Druzhba Yoshkar-Ola	Soviet Second League B, Zone 7, 5th	Geliy Putevskoy
FC Zenit Chelyabinsk	Soviet Second League B, Zone 7, 6th	Mirgarifan Shafigulin
FC Svetotekhnika Saransk	Soviet Second League B, Zone 5, 2nd	Vladimir Solovyov
FC Lada Dimitrovgrad	first professional season	Aleksandr Samygin
FC Metallurg Magnitogorsk	Soviet Second League B, Zone 7, 2nd	Viktor Lukashenko
FC Atommash Volgodonsk	Soviet Second League B, Zone 4, 5th	Aleksandr Rakov
FC Gastello Ufa	Soviet Second League, Center, 18th	Yuri Surenskiy
FC Dynamo Kirov	Soviet Second League B, Zone 7, 7th	Aleksandr Vozhegov (until August); Boris Ulitin (from September)

=== Standings ===
Pos	Team	Pld	W	D	L	GF	GA	GD	Pts	Promotion or relegation
1	KAMAZ Naberezhnye Chelny (P)	34	26	3	5	78	19	+59	55	Promotion to Top League
2	Torpedo Ryazan	34	19	8	7	55	38	+17	46	
3	Zvezda Perm	34	18	9	7	59	36	+23	45	
4	Torpedo Volzhsky	34	15	10	9	65	37	+28	40	
5	Rubin-TAN Kazan	34	15	9	10	43	30	+13	39	
6	Lada-Togliatti	34	15	8	11	57	40	+17	38	
7	Sokol Saratov	34	15	7	12	70	47	+23	37	
8	Uralets Nizhny Tagil	34	12	13	9	41	27	+14	37	
9	Torpedo Miass	34	14	7	13	42	54	−12	35	
10	Zenit Izhevsk	34	11	12	11	51	47	+4	34	
11	Druzhba Yoshkar-Ola	34	13	5	16	47	52	−5	31	
12	Zenit Chelyabinsk	34	10	10	14	44	58	−14	30	
13	Svetotekhnika Saransk	34	11	7	16	50	66	−16	29	
14	Lada Dimitrovgrad	34	10	8	16	34	62	−28	28	
15	Metallurg Magnitogorsk	34	10	8	16	30	43	−13	28	
16	Atommash Volgodonsk (R)	34	11	5	18	26	59	−33	27	Relegation to Second League
17	Gastello Ufa (R)	34	6	7	21	27	61	−34	19	Relegation to Second League
18	Dynamo Kirov (R)	34	4	6	24	21	64	−43	14	Relegation to Second League

Source: RSSSF
(P) Promoted; (R) Relegated

=== Top goalscorers ===
Rank	Player	Team	Goals
1	(Russia) Oleg Teryokhin	Sokol	27
2	(Russia) Sergei Chesnakas	Lada-Tg	26
2	(Russia) Viktor Panchenko	KAMAZ	26
4	(Russia) Vladimir Filimonov	Zvezda (P)	21
5	(Russia) Dmitri Petrenko	Torpedo (Vlzh)	19
6	(Russia) Marat Mulashev	Rubin-TAN	18
7	(Russia) Andrei Ivanov	Zenit (Izh)	16
8	(Armenia) Garnik Avalyan	Torpedo (Rz)	14
8	(Russia) Mikhail Potylchak	Torpedo (Vlzh)	14
10	(Russia) Salekh Abdulkayumov	Torpedo (Rz)	13

== East ==
=== Overview ===
Team	1991 league and position	Head coach
FC Luch Vladivostok	Soviet Second League B, Zone 10, 8th	Lev Burchalkin (until August); Aleksandr Ivchenko (from August)
FC Irtysh Omsk	Soviet Second League B, Zone 10, 3rd	Vyacheslav Martynov
FC Lokomotiv Chita	Soviet Second League B, Zone 10, 1st	Aleksandr Kovalyov
FC Chkalovets-FoKuMiS Novosibirsk	Soviet Second League B, Zone 10, 4th (as FC Chkalovets Novosibirsk)	Valeri Yerkovich
FC Selenga Ulan-Ude	Soviet Second League B, Zone 10, 12th	Yuri Zubkov
FC Zvezda-Yunis-Sib Irkutsk	Soviet Second League, East, 6th (as FC Zvezda Irkutsk)	Sergey Muratov
FC Tom Tomsk	Soviet Second League B, Zone 10, 6th	Vladimir Pomeshchikov
FC Dynamo Yakutsk	Soviet Second League B, Zone 10, 10th	Yuri Pudyshev
FC Metallurg Novokuznetsk	Soviet Second League B, Zone 10, 5th	Vladislav Sosnov
FC Metallurg Krasnoyarsk	Soviet Second League B, Zone 10, 7th	Aleksandr Kishinyovskiy
FC Kuzbass Kemerovo	Soviet Second League, East, 7th	Aleksandr Krasnozhyonov
FC Dynamo Barnaul	Soviet Second League, East, 15th	Viktor Volynkin
FC Sakhalin Yuzhno-Sakhalinsk	Soviet Second League, East, 19th	B. Tibilov
FC SKA Khabarovsk	Soviet Second League B, Zone 10, 2nd	Vladimir Bychek
FC Amur Blagoveshchensk	Soviet Second League, East, 13th	Anatoli Kulik
FC Amur Komsomolsk-na-Amure	Soviet Second League B, Zone 10, 11th	Yevgeni Kozhemyako

=== Standings ===
Pos	Team	Pld	W	D	L	GF	GA	GD	Pts	Promotion or relegation
1	Luch Vladivostok (P)	30	20	4	6	44	14	+30	44	Promotion to Top League
2	Irtysh Omsk	30	18	6	6	45	25	+20	42	
3	Lokomotiv Chita	30	17	5	8	59	36	+23	39	
4	Chkalovets-FoKuMiS Novosibirsk	30	15	6	9	48	38	+10	36	
5	Selenga Ulan-Ude	30	14	7	9	43	34	+9	35	
6	Zvezda-Yunis-Sib Irkutsk	30	13	8	9	39	28	+11	34	
7	Tom Tomsk	30	11	10	9	29	24	+5	32	
8	Dynamo Yakutsk	30	13	5	12	41	32	+9	31	
9	Metallurg Novokuznetsk	30	12	3	15	35	40	−5	27	
10	Metallurg Krasnoyarsk	30	11	4	15	37	41	−4	26	
11	Kuzbass Kemerovo	30	11	3	16	48	53	−5	25	
12	Dynamo Barnaul	30	10	5	15	26	36	−10	25	
13	Sakhalin Yuzhno-Sakhalinsk	30	9	6	15	35	49	−14	24	
14	SKA Khabarovsk	30	9	5	16	32	44	−12	23	
15	Amur Blagoveshchensk (R)	30	7	7	16	28	58	−30	21	Relegation to Second League
16	Amur Komsomolsk-na-Amure (R)	30	4	8	18	16	49	−33	16	Relegation to Second League

Source: RSSSF
(P) Promoted; (R) Relegated

=== Top goalscorers ===
Rank	Player	Team	Goals
1	(Russia) Vyacheslav Kartashov	Irtysh	19
2	(Russia) Vladimir Misyuchenko	Dynamo (Yak)	13
2	(Russia) Vladislav Yarkin	Kuzbass	13
4	(Russia) Aleksandr Alfyorov	Zvezda-Yunis-Sib	12
5	(Russia) Vadim Bogdanov	Metallurg (Kr)	11
5	(Russia) Sergei Kovalyov	Chkalovets-FoKuMiS	11
7	(Russia) Vladislav Kadyrov	Sakhalin	10
8	(Russia) Maksim Dubovik	Luch	9
8	(Russia) Yevgeni Kasyanenko	Luch	9
8	(Russia) Vladimir Puzanov	Chkalovets-FoKuMiS	9
8	(Russia) Sergei Rogalevskiy	Kuzbass	9
8	(Russia) Andrei Seroshtan	Metallurg (Nk)	9
8	(Russia) Andrei Skovpen	Kuzbass	9

== See also ==
- 1992 Russian Top League
- 1992 Russian Second League
