= 1993 Russian First League =

Russian First League
- Season: 1993

The 1993 Russian First League was the 2nd edition of Russian First Division. There were 3 zones with 58 teams in total. The winner of each zone qualified for the promotion tournament to play against the teams that took places 14 to 16 in the 18-team 1993 Russian Top League, 3 top teams from the tournament qualified for the 1994 Russian Top League. For 1994 the Russian league system was reorganized, with First League reduced to one zone of 22 teams, so most of the 1993 Russian First League teams were relegated at the end of the season.

== West ==
=== Overview ===
Team	Head coach
FC Chernomorets Novorossiysk	Oleg Dolmatov
FC Avtodor-Olaf Vladikavkaz	Igor Tsakoyev
FC Erzu Grozny	Vait Talgayev
FC Baltika Kaliningrad	Kornei Shperling
FC Smena-Saturn St. Petersburg	Viktor Vinogradov
FC Torpedo Vladimir	Yuri Pyanov
FC Druzhba Maykop	Nurbiy Khakunov
FC Uralan Elista	Arnold Lendengolts
FC Fakel Voronezh	Valeri Nenenko (until October); Sergei Savchenkov (from October)
FC Metallurg Lipetsk	Aleksandr Ignatenko
FC Terek Grozny	Khaidar Alkhanov
FC Spartak Anapa	Mikhail Skachkov
FC Torpedo Taganrog	Aleksandr Skotarenko (until June); Vladimir Novik (from July)
FC Kolos Krasnodar	Viktor Tishchenko (until April); Adolf Poskotin (May to June); Yevgeni Tikhomirov (July to August); Yuri Kotov (September to October); Fyodor Novikov (from October)
FC Kuban Krasnodar	Leonid Nazarenko
PFC Spartak Nalchik	Kazbek Tlyarugov
FC Tekstilshchik Ivanovo	Vladimir Belkov
FC Orekhovo Orekhovo-Zuyevo	Vladimir Yermichev
FC Dynamo Vologda	Leon Yagubyants
FC Asmaral Kislovodsk	Yuri Dyachenko
FC Nart Cherkessk	Aleksandr Perepelkin (until May); Nikolai Shvydkiy (June to September); Nurbiy Lakhov (from October)
FC APK Azov	Yuri Zakharov (until June); Sergei Stetyukha (from July)

=== Standings ===
Pos	Team	Pld	W	D	L	GF	GA	GD	Pts	Qualification or relegation
1	Chernomorets Novorossiysk (Note: FC Gekris Novorossiysk was renamed to FC Chernomorets Novorossiysk.) (A)	42	29	7	6	121	33	+88	65	Qualification to Promotion tournament
2	Avtodor-Olaf Vladikavkaz	42	24	11	7	76	45	+31	59	
3	Erzu Grozny	42	24	7	11	72	26	+46	55	
4	Baltika Kaliningrad	42	22	9	11	67	44	+23	53	
5	Smena-Saturn St. Petersburg	42	24	4	14	70	50	+20	52	
6	Torpedo Vladimir	42	22	7	13	67	53	+14	51	
7	Druzhba Maykop	42	20	9	13	70	55	+15	49	
8	Uralan Elista	42	23	2	17	60	64	−4	48	
9	Fakel Voronezh (R)	42	17	13	12	58	38	+20	47	Relegation to Second League
10	Metallurg Lipetsk (R)	42	20	6	16	68	50	+18	46	Relegation to Second League
11	Terek Grozny (R)	42	20	4	18	76	63	+13	44	Relegation to Second League
12	Spartak Anapa (R)	42	19	5	18	59	65	−6	43	Relegation to Second League
13	Torpedo Taganrog (R)	42	18	7	17	62	65	−3	43	Relegation to Second League
14	Kolos Krasnodar (R)	42	17	8	17	47	57	−10	42	Relegation to Second League
15	Kuban Krasnodar (R)	42	15	8	19	62	82	−20	38	Relegation to Second League
16	Spartak Nalchik (R)	42	13	8	21	52	73	−21	34	Relegation to Second League
17	Tekstilshchik Ivanovo (R)	42	12	8	22	49	58	−9	32	Relegation to Second League
18	Orekhovo Orekhovo-Zuyevo (Note: FC Znamya Truda Orekhovo-Zuyevo was renamed to FC Orekhovo Orekhovo-Zuyevo) (R)	42	10	11	21	42	64	−22	31	Relegation to Second League
19	Dynamo Vologda (R)	42	10	10	22	36	65	−29	30	Relegation to Second League
20	Asmaral Kislovodsk (R)	42	8	10	24	33	68	−35	26	Relegation to Third League
21	Nart Cherkessk (R)	42	9	5	28	30	84	−54	23	Relegation to Third League
22	APK Azov (Note: FC APK Azov played in the amateur leagues in 1994 under the name of FC APK Morozovsk) (R)	42	4	5	33	25	98	−73	13	Relegation to Third League

Source: RSSSF
(A) Advance to a further round; (R) Relegated

=== Top goalscorers ===
Rank	Player	Team	Goals
1	(Russia) Sergei Burdin	Chernomorets	25
2	(Russia) Yuri Vostrukhin	Torpedo (Tg)	24
3	(Russia) Andrei Lapushkin	Smena-Saturn	22
4	(Russia) Khazret Dyshekov	Chernomorets	21
5	(Russia) Valeri Borisov	Kolos	19
5	(Russia) Murat Gomleshko	Kuban	19
7	(Russia) Lev Berezner	Chernomorets	18
7	(Russia) Gennady Korkin	Metallurg (Lp)	18
7	(Russia) Igor Tikhonov	Tekstilshchik	18
7	(Russia) Tamazi Yenik	Druzhba	18

== Center ==
=== Overview ===
Team	Head coach
FC Lada Togliatti	Vladimir Yevsyukov
FC Zenit St. Petersburg	Vyacheslav Melnikov
FC Interros Moscow	Aleksandr Irkhin (until July)
FC Zvezda Perm	Viktor Slesarev
FC Sokol Saratov	Aleksandr Koreshkov
FC Shinnik Yaroslavl	Igor Volchok
FC Neftekhimik Nizhnekamsk	Gennadi Sarychev
FC Rubin-TAN Kazan	Viktor Lukashenko (until July); Murat Zadikashvili (from July)
FC Lada Dimitrovgrad	Vladimir Yurin
FC Torpedo Volzhsky	Oleg Dudarin
FC Gazovik Izhevsk	Aleksandr Salnov
FC Uralets Nizhny Tagil	Viktor Konshin
FC Svetotekhnika Saransk	Vladimir Solovyov
FC Druzhba Yoshkar-Ola	Valeri Volodin
FC Torpedo Ryazan	Sergei Nedosekin
FC Metallurg Magnitogorsk	Boris Kopeikin (until July); Arkadi Shestayev (from August)
FC Avangard Kamyshin	Vladimir Nemchenko
FC Torpedo Miass	Gennadi Nedelkin
FC Zenit Chelyabinsk	Valeri Znarok
FC Zenit Izhevsk	Valeri Salnikov (until June); Nikolai Gorshkov (from June)

=== Standings ===
Pos	Team	Pld	W	D	L	GF	GA	GD	Pts	Qualification or relegation
1	Lada-Togliatti (A)	38	25	10	3	80	29	+51	60	Qualification to Promotion tournament
2	Zenit St. Petersburg	38	25	8	5	87	33	+54	58	
3	Interros Moscow (Note: FC Interros Moskovskiy moved to Moscow.)	38	21	8	9	89	42	+47	50	
4	Zvezda Perm	38	18	11	9	93	50	+43	47	
5	Sokol Saratov	38	18	10	10	76	41	+35	46	
6	Shinnik Yaroslavl	38	17	12	9	78	47	+31	46	
7	Neftekhimik Nizhnekamsk	38	18	9	11	45	33	+12	45	
8	Rubin-TAN Kazan (R)	38	19	6	13	48	46	+2	44	Relegation to Second League
9	Lada Dimitrovgrad (R)	38	18	5	15	46	32	+14	41	Relegation to Second League
10	Torpedo Volzhsky (R)	38	17	7	14	54	49	+5	41	Relegation to Second League
11	Gazovik Izhevsk (R)	38	17	7	14	57	56	+1	41	Relegation to Second League
12	Uralets Nizhny Tagil (R)	38	14	6	18	42	48	−6	34	Relegation to Second League
13	Svetotekhnika Saransk (R)	38	12	8	18	51	66	−15	32	Relegation to Second League
14	Druzhba Yoshkar-Ola (R)	38	10	9	19	41	70	−29	29	Relegation to Second League
15	Torpedo Ryazan (R)	38	10	8	20	37	56	−19	28	Relegation to Second League
16	Metallurg Magnitogorsk (R)	38	10	7	21	41	70	−29	27	Relegation to Second League
17	Avangard Kamyshin (R)	38	8	10	20	38	73	−35	26	Relegation to Third League
18	Torpedo Miass (R)	38	8	9	21	28	71	−43	25	Relegation to Second League
19	Zenit Chelyabinsk (Note: FC Zenit Chelyabinsk did not participate in any national-level competitions in 1994, including the Amateur Football League.) (R)	38	7	8	23	40	84	−44	22	Relegation to Third League
20	Zenit Izhevsk (R)	38	7	4	27	31	106	−75	18	Relegation to Third League

Source: RSSSF
(A) Advance to a further round; (R) Relegated

=== Top goalscorers ===
Rank	Player	Team	Goals
1	(Russia) Vladimir Filimonov	Zvezda (P)	37
2	(Russia) Vladimir Kulik	Zenit	36
3	(Russia) Sergei Chesnakas	Lada	31
4	(Russia) Oleg Teryokhin	Sokol	29
5	(Russia) Oleg Smirnov	Shinnik	25
6	(Russia) Andrei Ivanov	Gazovik	21
6	(Russia) Aleksei Snigiryov	Interros	21
8	(Russia) Mikhail Nikitin	Sokol	20
9	(Russia) Igor Kozlov	Interros	17
10	(Russia) Yuri Bavykin	Lada	15
10	(Russia) Lev Matveyev	Zvezda (P)	15

== East ==
=== Overview ===
Team	Head coach
FC Dynamo-Gazovik Tyumen	Eduard Malofeyev
FC Irtysh Omsk	Artyom Amirdzhanov
FC Zarya Leninsk-Kuznetsky	Sergei Vasyutin
FC Lokomotiv Chita	Aleksandr Kovalyov
FC Zvezda-Yunis-Sib Irkutsk	Sergei Muratov
FC Kuzbass Kemerovo	Geliy Shershevskiy
FC Dynamo Yakutsk	Anatoli Samkov
FC Metallurg Aldan	Vladimir Nomirovskiy
FC Metallurg Krasnoyarsk	Aleksandr Kishinevsky
FC Sakhalin Kholmsk	B. Tibilov
FC Metallurg Novokuznetsk	Valeri Suldin
FC Tom Tomsk	Vladimir Pomeshchikov
FC Dynamo Barnaul	Stanislav Kaminskiy
FC Chkalovets Novosibirsk	Valeri Yerkovich
FC Selenga Ulan-Ude	Yuri Zubkov
FC SKA Khabarovsk	Vladimir Bychek

=== Standings ===
Pos	Team	Pld	W	D	L	GF	GA	GD	Pts	Qualification or relegation
1	Dynamo-Gazovik Tyumen (A)	30	19	5	6	55	26	+29	43	Qualification to Promotion tournament
2	Irtysh Omsk	30	16	7	7	52	33	+19	39	
3	Zarya Leninsk-Kuznetsky	30	15	9	6	47	24	+23	39	
4	Lokomotiv Chita	30	15	8	7	39	33	+6	38	
5	Zvezda-Yunis-Sib Irkutsk	30	16	5	9	51	38	+13	37	
6	Kuzbass Kemerovo (R)	30	15	5	10	53	38	+15	35	Relegation to Second League
7	Dynamo Yakutsk (R)	30	14	7	9	41	27	+14	35	Relegation to Second League
8	Metallurg Aldan (Note: FC Metallurg Aldan did not participate in any national-level competitions in 1994, including the Amateur Football League.) (R)	30	11	8	11	31	29	+2	30	Relegation to Second League
9	Metallurg Krasnoyarsk (R)	30	11	7	12	33	35	−2	29	Relegation to Second League
10	Sakhalin Kholmsk (Note: FC Sakhalin Yuzhno-Sakhalinsk moved to Kholmsk) (R)	30	11	5	14	38	60	−22	27	Relegation to Second League
11	Metallurg Novokuznetsk (R)	30	11	3	16	35	54	−19	25	Relegation to Second League
12	Tom Tomsk (R)	30	9	7	14	41	40	+1	25	Relegation to Second League
13	Dynamo Barnaul (R)	30	9	5	16	47	56	−9	23	Relegation to Second League
14	Chkalovets Novosibirsk (Note: FC Chkalovets-FoKuMiS Novosibirsk renamed to FC Chkalovets Novosibirsk) (R)	30	8	7	15	39	43	−4	23	Relegation to Second League
15	Selenga Ulan-Ude (R)	30	8	6	16	25	48	−23	22	Relegation to Second League
16	SKA Khabarovsk (R)	30	2	6	22	16	59	−43	10	Relegation to Second League

Source: RSSSF
(A) Advance to a further round; (R) Relegated

=== Top goalscorers ===
Rank	Player	Team	Goals
1	(Russia) Vyacheslav Kamoltsev	Dynamo-Gazovik	22
2	(Russia) Andrey Dementyev	Kuzbass	16
3	(Russia) Vyacheslav Kartashov	Irtysh Omsk	15
3	(Russia) Vladimir Vekvart	Lokomotiv (Ch)	15
5	(Russia) Oleg Razzamazov	Tom	14
6	(Russia) Yevgeni Burdinskiy	Zarya	13
7	(Armenia) Karapet Mikaelyan	Zvezda-Yunis-Sib	11
8	(Russia) Vladislav Kadyrov	Sakhalin	10
8	(Russia) Andrei Skovpen	Kuzbass	10
10	(Russia) Vadim Bazhenov	Zarya	9
10	(Russia) Sergei Chernov	Metallurg (Nk)	9
10	(Russia) Valeri Matyunin	Kuzbass	9
10	(Russia) Aleksandr Muzyka	Dynamo (Yak)	9
10	(Russia) Oleg Nikulin	Chkalovets	9
10	(Russia) Yevgeni Sadovnikov	Metallurg (Kr)	9
10	(Russia) Nikolai Tarakanov	Sakhalin	9

== Promotion tournament ==
Pos	Team	Pld	W	D	L	GF	GA	GD	Pts	Promotion or relegation
1	Krylia Sovetov Samara	5	3	1	1	10	8	+2	7	Promotion to Top League
2	Lada-Togliatti	5	2	3	0	8	3	+5	7	Promotion to Top League
3	Dynamo-Gazovik Tyumen	5	3	0	2	8	5	+3	6	Promotion to Top League
4	Luch Vladivostok	5	2	2	1	11	9	+2	6	Relegation to First League
5	Chernomorets Novorossiysk	5	1	1	3	7	10	−3	3	Relegation to First League
6	Okean Nakhodka	5	0	1	4	5	14	−9	1	Relegation to First League

Source: RSSSF

== See also ==
- 1993 Russian Top League
- 1993 Russian Second League
