= 1997 Russian First League =

Russian First League
- Season: 1997

The 1997 Russian First League was the 6th edition of the Russian First Division.

== Overview ==
Team	Head coach
FC Uralan Elista	(Ukraine) Pavlo Yakovenko
FC Metallurg Lipetsk	Valeri Tretyakov
FC Sokol-PZhD Saratov	Nikolay Kiselyov
PFC Spartak Nalchik	Viktor Kumykov
FC Lokomotiv St. Petersburg	(Georgia (country)) Givi Nodia
FC Lada-Grad Dimitrovgrad	Vladimir Yevsyukov
FC CSK VVS-Kristall Smolensk	Valeri Nenenko
FC Lokomotiv Chita	Aleksandr Kovalyov
FC Saturn Ramenskoye	Vladimir Mukhanov (until April); Vladimir Shevchuk (from April)
FC Dynamo Stavropol	Sergei Zimenkov (until June); Boris Stukalov (from July)
FC Neftekhimik Nizhnekamsk	Viktor Antikhovich (until July)
FC Gazovik-Gazprom Izhevsk	Vitaliy Shevchenko (until September); Aleksandr Kishinevsky (from September)
FC Anzhi Makhachkala	(Belarus) Eduard Malofeyev
FC Lada-Togliatti-VAZ Togliatti	Viktor Tishchenko (until June); Vladimir Dergach (from June)
FC Druzhba Maykop	Soferbi Yeshugov (until August); Vitali Aksyonov (from August)
FC Kuban Krasnodar	Vladimir Brazhnikov
FC Irtysh Omsk	Aleksandr Ivchenko
FC Zarya Leninsk-Kuznetsky	Sergei Vasyutin
FC Energiya Kamyshin	Sergei Pavlov
FC Uralmash Yekaterinburg	Viktor Yerokhin
FC Torpedo Volzhsky	Oleg Dudarin
FC Luch Vladivostok	Vitali Koberskiy

== Standings ==
Pos	Team	Pld	W	D	L	GF	GA	GD	Pts	Promotion or relegation
1	Uralan Elista (P)	42	29	5	8	67	22	+45	92	Promotion to Top Division
2	Metallurg Lipetsk	42	26	6	10	80	41	+39	84	
3	Sokol-PZhD Saratov	42	21	11	10	58	35	+23	74	
4	Spartak Nalchik	42	23	3	16	74	53	+21	72	
5	Lokomotiv St. Petersburg	42	19	13	10	55	38	+17	70	
6	Lada-Grad Dimitrovgrad (Note: FC Lada Dimitrovgrad renamed to FC Lada-Grad)	42	20	9	13	80	71	+9	69	
7	CSK VVS-Kristall Smolensk	42	19	11	12	70	45	+25	68	
8	Lokomotiv Chita	42	21	2	19	62	63	−1	65 (Note: FC Lokomotiv Chita awarded 2 home wins)	
9	Saturn Ramenskoye	42	19	6	17	65	55	+10	63	
10	Dynamo Stavropol	42	18	8	16	54	58	−4	62	
11	Neftekhimik Nizhnekamsk	42	19	4	19	53	54	−1	61	
12	Gazovik-Gazprom Izhevsk	42	18	7	17	42	39	+3	61	
13	Anzhi Makhachkala	42	18	6	18	66	72	−6	60	
14	Lada-Togliatti-VAZ Togliatti (Note: FC Lada Togliatti renamed to FC Lada-Togliatti-VAZ)	42	16	12	14	61	56	+5	60	
15	Druzhba Maykop	42	17	6	19	51	62	−11	57	
16	Kuban Krasnodar	42	16	9	17	63	66	−3	57	
17	Irtysh Omsk	42	15	12	15	52	53	−1	57	
18	Zarya Leninsk-Kuznetsky (R)	42	12	9	21	39	58	−19	45	Relegation to Second Division
19	Energiya Kamyshin (Note: FC Energiya-Tekstilshchik Kamyshin renamed to FC Energiya) (R)	42	10	8	24	46	67	−21	38	Relegation to Second Division
20	Uralmash Yekaterinburg (R)	42	9	8	25	43	77	−34	35	Relegation to Second Division
21	Torpedo Volzhsky (R)	42	9	3	30	29	72	−43	30	Relegation to Second Division
22	Luch Vladivostok (R)	42	3	12	27	23	76	−53	21 (Note: FC Luch Vladivostok awarded 1 home win.)	Relegation to Second Division

Source: RSSSF
(P) Promoted; (R) Relegated

== Results ==
Home \ Away	ANZ	DRU	DST	ENE	GGI	IRT	KRI	KUB	LGD	LTV	LCH	LSP	LUC	MTL	NEF	SAT	SOK	SPN	TVO	URE	URA	ZAR
Anzhi Makhachkala		5–1	3–2	4–1	2–1	3–2	4–2	0–0	4–4	0–1	2–0	1–0	1–1	0–2	2–1	4–1	1–0	2–0	2–0	0–1	5–2	4–0
Druzhba Maykop	2–1		0–1	2–2	1–4	3–1	0–0	3–0	1–3	1–0	3–1	3–1	1–0	2–0	0–1	3–0	1–0	1–0	3–0	1–4	2–0	1–1
Dynamo Stavropol	0–3	1–0		3–0	1–0	3–0	2–2	3–1	2–2	2–1	3–1	4–0	3–1	2–0	1–0	1–0	1–1	3–1	3–0	1–2	1–0	0–0
Energiya Kamyshin	2–0	1–2	2–0		1–1	0–2	0–1	2–0	1–2	0–2	2–0	0–1	1–0	1–1	1–2	5–0	0–1	2–1	4–2	2–2	1–1	0–2
Gazovik-Gazprom	1–0	2–1	0–0	1–0		0–0	1–0	2–0	4–0	1–1	2–1	2–1	2–1	0–1	1–0	3–1	0–2	0–0	1–0	0–1	2–1	2–0
Irtysh Omsk	1–1	2–0	2–2	0–0	1–0		1–0	4–2	3–2	0–0	3–2	1–1	2–0	2–0	2–1	1–0	1–1	5–2	2–0	0–2	4–0	1–0
CSK VVS-Kristall Smolensk	5–3	2–0	6–0	1–0	2–0	2–1		0–0	1–3	3–0	5–1	0–0	4–0	5–2	3–0	2–0	0–0	4–1	4–2	2–0	2–0	1–1
Kuban Krasnodar	3–0	1–1	1–3	5–1	2–0	3–0	1–1		3–1	1–1	5–0	2–2	1–1	0–3	2–1	2–0	1–1	4–2	1–0	2–0	5–3	3–0
Lada-Grad Dimitrovgrad	1–1	5–2	1–0	4–1	2–0	1–0	5–2	2–0		3–3	1–0	2–2	6–0	0–2	2–2	3–1	1–2	3–1	3–0	0–0	2–1	3–1
Lada-Togliatti-VAZ	2–2	3–1	0–0	1–2	0–2	5–1	1–0	2–0	3–1		2–0	2–2	5–0	2–1	0–1	4–2	0–1	2–0	3–0	0–4	1–1	2–1
Lokomotiv Chita	3–1	3–0	1–0	3–0	2–1	1–0	1–1	2–1	4–2	4–1		1–0	1–0	0–1	5–3	2–1	1–0	1–0	2–1	1–0	3–0	2–0
Lokomotiv St. Petersburg	7–0	2–0	1–0	1–0	1–0	1–1	1–1	2–1	1–1	0–0	2–1		4–0	3–1	2–0	0–0	0–1	3–0	2–0	2–1	2–0	1–0
Luch Vladivostok	0–1	2–2	2–1	1–0	0–0	0–0	1–1	1–2	0–2	1–1	1–2	1–2		1–1	0–2	1–1	0–0	0–0	3–0	0–0	0–2	0–1
Metallurg Lipetsk	5–0	1–0	1–1	2–0	3–2	1–1	3–1	6–0	3–0	3–0	5–2	4–0	4–1		1–0	1–0	3–1	1–0	2–0	1–0	4–2	3–1
Neftekhimik Nizhnekamsk	2–0	1–0	2–0	1–0	0–1	3–2	2–1	3–1	1–2	4–1	3–1	0–0	2–0	0–0		0–5	3–1	2–1	1–0	0–1	1–2	3–1
Saturn Ramenskoye	4–0	5–0	2–0	4–1	2–0	2–1	1–0	3–1	3–0	3–3	3–2	2–0	2–1	2–0	1–1		0–1	1–1	1–0	1–0	5–0	2–0
Sokol-PZhD Saratov	1–0	3–0	6–1	1–1	2–1	2–1	0–0	3–3	2–2	0–0	2–0	0–1	5–0	0–1	3–1	3–0		1–0	2–0	1–0	2–0	1–0
Spartak Nalchik	5–2	0–3	2–0	1–0	2–0	2–0	2–0	3–0	6–0	4–1	2–1	2–1	2–1	2–1	2–1	4–1	2–0		2–0	1–0	7–0	3–1
Torpedo Volzhsky	1–0	0–1	3–1	0–3	0–0	1–0	1–2	0–1	2–0	0–2	1–0	1–1	2–0	3–2	0–2	0–1	3–2	1–2		1–3	0–2	3–2
Uralan Elista	3–0	2–1	4–0	3–1	1–0	3–0	3–0	1–0	3–0	1–0	2–1	2–0	2–0	1–1	1–0	1–0	4–0	3–2	2–0		2–0	1–0
Uralmash Yekaterinburg	1–2	0–1	4–1	3–2	2–0	0–0	1–0	1–2	1–3	2–3	1–1	0–0	3–1	0–1	3–0	1–1	0–2	0–1	1–1	0–1		0–0
Zarya Leninsk-Kuznetsky	1–0	1–1	0–1	3–3	1–2	1–1	0–1	2–0	2–0	1–0	0–2	0–2	2–0	3–2	2–0	2–1	1–1	1–3	1–0	0–0	3–2	

Legend: Blue = home team win; Yellow = draw; Red = away team win.

== Top goalscorers ==
Rank	Player	Team	Goals
1	(Russia) Aleksei Chernov	Lada-Grad	29
2	(Russia) Valeri Solyanik	CSK VVS-Kristall	23
3	(Russia) Marat Mulashev	Irtysh	18
4	(Russia) Rustyam Fakhrutdinov	Neftekhimik	17
4	(Azerbaijan) Ibragim Gasanbekov	Anzhi	17
4	(Latvia) Aleksandrs Jelisejevs	Metallurg	17
4	(Russia) Oleg Nechayev	Lada-Grad	17
8	(Russia) Igor Menshchikov	Metallurg	15
8	(Russia) Valeri Shushlyakov	Kuban	15
8	(Azerbaijan) Narvik Sirkhayev	Anzhi	15

== See also ==
- 1997 Russian Top League
- 1997 Russian Second League
- 1997 Russian Third League
