= 1995 Russian First League =

Russian First League
- Season: 1995

The 1995 Russian First League was the 4th edition of Russian First Division. It was the first season when 3 points were awarded for a win.

== Overview ==
Team	Head coach
FC Baltika Kaliningrad	Leonid Tkachenko
FC Lada Togliatti	Viktor Antikhovich
FC Zenit St. Petersburg	Pavel Sadyrin
FC Zvezda Irkutsk	Sergei Muratov
FC Shinnik Yaroslavl	Igor Volchok
FC Luch Vladivostok	Lev Burchalkin
FC Neftekhimik Nizhnekamsk	Gennadi Sarychev
FC Lokomotiv Chita	Aleksandr Kovalyov
FC Dynamo Stavropol	Boris Stukalov
FC Sokol-PZhD Saratov	Aleksandr Koreshkov
FC Chkalovets Novosibirsk	Leonid Shevchenko
FC Zarya Leninsk-Kuznetsky	Sergei Vasyutin
FC Fakel Voronezh	Sergei Savchenkov
FC Torpedo Arzamas	Vladimir Dergach (until May); Valeri Tikhonov (from June)
FC Uralan Elista	Viktor Lidzhiyev
FC Torpedo Volzhsky	Oleg Dudarin (until May); Vladimir Dergach (from June)
FC Okean Nakhodka	Ishtvan Sekech
FC Druzhba Maykop	Soferbi Yeshugov
FC Saturn-1991 St. Petersburg	Leonid Ostroushko (until June); Oleg Tereshonkov (from June)
FC Irtysh Omsk	Vladimir Arays (until June); Aleksandr Ivchenko (from June)
FC Kolos Krasnodar	Valeriy Yaremchenko (until August); Leonid Pakhomov (from August)
FC Asmaral Moscow	Vladimir Mikhaylov

== Standings ==
Pos	Team	Pld	W	D	L	GF	GA	GD	Pts	Promotion or relegation
1	Baltika Kaliningrad (P)	42	29	5	8	83	30	+53	92	Promotion to Top League
2	Lada-Togliatti (P)	42	25	4	13	67	39	+28	79	Promotion to Top League
3	Zenit St. Petersburg (P)	42	24	5	13	65	42	+23	77	Promotion to Top League
4	Zvezda Irkutsk	42	23	4	15	61	50	+11	73	
5	Shinnik Yaroslavl	42	21	9	12	56	39	+17	72	
6	Luch Vladivostok	42	20	6	16	51	48	+3	66	
7	Neftekhimik Nizhnekamsk	42	20	5	17	55	50	+5	65	
8	Lokomotiv Chita	42	20	5	17	66	67	−1	65	
9	Dynamo Stavropol	42	20	3	19	66	51	+15	63	
10	Sokol-PZhD Saratov (Note: FC Sokol Saratov renamed to FC Sokol-PZhD.)	42	19	4	19	62	56	+6	61	
11	Chkalovets Novosibirsk	42	19	4	19	58	65	−7	61	
12	Zarya Leninsk-Kuznetsky	42	17	7	18	69	53	+16	58	
13	Fakel Voronezh	42	17	6	19	54	48	+6	57	
14	Torpedo Arzamas	42	17	6	19	60	67	−7	57	
15	Uralan Elista	42	16	8	18	56	61	−5	56	
16	Torpedo Volzhsky	42	16	7	19	75	74	+1	55	
17	Okean Nakhodka	42	15	5	22	43	56	−13	50	
18	Druzhba Maykop	42	14	8	20	51	65	−14	50	
19	Saturn-1991 St. Petersburg (Note: FC Smena-Saturn St. Petersburg renamed to FC Saturn-1991. Saturn-1991 did not play in any national-level competitions in 1996.) (R)	42	14	7	21	45	62	−17	49	Relegation to Second League
20	Irtysh Omsk (R)	42	13	6	23	47	82	−35	45	Relegation to Second League
21	Kolos Krasnodar (R)	42	13	6	23	44	66	−22	45	Relegation to Second League
22	Asmaral Moscow (R)	42	8	4	30	35	98	−63	28	Relegation to Second League

Source: RSSSF
(P) Promoted; (R) Relegated

== Results ==
Home \ Away	ASM	BAL	CHK	DRU	DST	FAK	IRT	KOL	LAD	LCH	LUC	NEF	OKE	SAT	SHI	SOK	TAR	TVO	URE	ZAR	ZEN
Asmaral Moscow		0–3	2–2	2–1	1–0	1–0	2–1	3–1	1–2	1–5	1–1	0–2	2–1	1–1	1–2	0–1	2–4	0–3	1–1	3–2	2–3
Baltika Kaliningrad	1–0		1–2	2–0	2–0	2–1	4–1	4–1	1–0	3–0	4–0	1–0	4–0	4–1	2–3	5–0	6–1	1–0	2–1	1–0	2–1
Chkalovets Novosibirsk	2–1	2–3		2–0	3–1	3–0	3–0	2–1	2–1	3–1	2–0	1–0	1–0	3–1	1–0	2–1	2–1	1–0	2–0	2–2	1–2
Druzhba Maykop	3–1	2–1	4–0		2–2	0–3	4–1	2–1	0–1	3–1	1–1	2–0	2–1	1–1	2–1	1–0	1–0	0–0	0–1	2–0	1–1
Dynamo Stavropol	4–0	0–0	1–1	2–1		4–0	3–0	4–0	4–2	3–0	2–1	0–1	3–1	2–0	1–0	3–0	3–0	5–1	2–0	2–1	1–0
Fakel Voronezh	5–1	0–0	3–1	2–1	3–1		2–1	0–2	1–1	2–0	2–0	2–0	0–0	3–0	1–0	1–0	4–1	1–0	2–1	2–0	0–1
Irtysh Omsk	3–0	0–4	2–0	1–3	1–0	0–2		4–0	1–0	3–2	4–3	1–1	2–1	0–1	1–1	1–6	4–3	0–0	1–1	3–1	2–3
Kolos Krasnodar	1–0	0–1	3–2	1–1	1–4	2–1	1–0		0–2	1–1	5–1	1–2	3–0	2–1	1–2	0–2	0–1	4–0	4–1	1–0	1–0
Lada-Togliatti	2–0	1–0	0–0	5–2	0–1	1–0	4–0	1–1		5–1	2–1	4–1	2–0	5–1	2–0	1–0	3–1	2–0	3–1	1–0	0–3
Lokomotiv Chita	4–1	1–0	1–0	5–1	3–0	3–1	1–0	2–0	1–2		3–1	1–0	1–0	1–0	1–0	2–0	2–2	2–2	2–1	4–3	3–0
Luch Vladivostok	2–0	0–0	1–0	1–0	1–0	2–1	1–0	1–0	3–0	3–1		3–0	0–1	2–0	1–1	2–1	2–0	3–2	2–1	5–1	1–0
Neftekhimik Nizhnekamsk	2–1	2–3	2–1	2–0	1–0	3–2	5–1	0–0	0–2	2–0	1–0		2–0	2–1	0–0	3–0	2–0	4–3	2–1	2–0	2–1
Okean Nakhodka	2–0	2–1	2–0	5–0	2–1	1–0	2–0	4–0	1–2	1–1	0–1	2–0		1–0	1–1	1–0	2–0	2–0	0–0	0–0	2–0
Saturn-1991 St. Petersburg	4–1	0–3	1–0	1–0	2–1	1–0	1–0	1–0	1–2	4–1	0–1	2–1	2–1		2–0	3–3	2–2	2–0	4–1	1–1	0–3
Shinnik Yaroslavl	2–0	1–1	2–1	5–2	5–2	0–0	3–0	1–0	1–0	2–0	2–1	1–0	2–0	2–1		2–0	4–0	2–1	2–0	2–0	0–0
Sokol-PZhD Saratov	4–0	2–3	4–1	2–0	1–2	2–1	1–2	3–0	1–0	2–0	2–0	1–0	2–0	1–0	0–0		2–1	1–1	0–1	2–0	4–0
Torpedo Arzamas	1–0	1–3	5–1	3–1	1–0	1–0	0–0	4–1	0–1	3–0	0–0	3–2	2–0	0–0	0–2	3–0		3–4	1–0	2–0	1–1
Torpedo Volzhsky	4–0	0–1	6–0	3–1	3–0	1–1	5–0	3–0	3–2	4–2	0–0	3–3	2–1	3–0	2–1	3–5	1–3		4–2	3–2	2–3
Uralan Elista	3–0	0–0	3–2	1–0	1–0	2–2	1–2	0–0	2–1	4–2	2–1	1–0	4–0	2–1	3–0	2–2	1–2	2–0		0–1	1–5
Zarya Leninsk-Kuznetsky	7–1	1–2	3–1	0–0	4–0	2–1	0–0	1–1	1–0	1–1	1–0	4–1	5–0	2–0	3–0	1–0	3–1	6–0	4–2		2–0
Zenit St. Petersburg	1–2	1–0	1–0	0–2	1–0	2–0	4–0	1–0	1–0	0–1	3–0	1–0	2–1	1–0	0–0	5–1	2–1	4–2	1–1	2–0	

Legend: Blue = home team win; Yellow = draw; Red = away team win.

== Top goalscorers ==
Rank	Player	Team	Goals
1	(Russia) Sergei Bulatov	Baltika	29
2	(Russia) Sergei Toporov	Zarya	28
3	(Russia) Mikhail Potylchak	Torpedo (Vlzh)	21
4	(Russia) Vladimir Kulik	Zenit	19
5	(Russia) Eduard Bogdanov	Uralan Elista	18
5	(Russia) Nail Galimov	Lokomotiv (Ch)	18
5	(Russia) Rustyam Fakhrutdinov	Neftekhimik	18
5	(Armenia) Karapet Mikaelyan	Zvezda	18
9	(Russia) Ayrat Akhmetgaliyev	Neftekhimik	16
9	(Russia) Oleg Rydny	Dynamo (St)	16
9	(Russia) Aleksandr Selenkov	Luch	16

== See also ==
- 1995 Russian Top League
- 1995 Russian Second League
- 1995 Russian Third League
