= 1999 Russian First Division =

Russian First Division
- Season: 1999

The 1999 Russian First Division was the eighth edition of the Russian First Division.

== Overview ==
Team	Head coach
FC Anzhi Makhachkala	Gadzhi Gadzhiyev
FC Fakel Voronezh	Valeri Nenenko
FC Sokol Saratov	Leonid Tkachenko
FC Torpedo-ZIL Moscow	Boris Ignatyev
FC Baltika Kaliningrad	Vladimir Dergach (until August); Anatoli Ivanov (from August)
FC Amkar Perm	Sergei Oborin
FC Rubin Kazan	Pavel Sadyrin
FC Gazovik-Gazprom Izhevsk	Aleksandr Ivchenko
FC Arsenal Tula	(Ukraine) Yevhen Kucherevskyi (until May); Vladimir Afonsky (caretaker, May to June) (Ukraine) Leonid Buryak (June to September); Vladimir Afonsky (caretaker, from September)
FC Lokomotiv Chita	Aleksandr Kovalyov
FC Kristall Smolensk	Aleksandr Ignatenko (until September); Lev Platonov (from September)
FC Tom Tomsk	Vladimir Yurin (until June); Vladimir Puzanov (from June)
PFC Spartak Nalchik	Aslanbek Khantsev
FC Metallurg Krasnoyarsk	Ishtvan Sekech
FC Metallurg Lipetsk	Stanislav Bernikov (until August); Sergei Savchenkov (from September)
FC Lokomotiv St. Petersburg	(Georgia (country)) Givi Nodia
FC Volgar-Gazprom Astrakhan	Enver Yulgushov
FC Tyumen	Viktor Knyazhev
FC Torpedo-Viktoriya Nizhny Novgorod	Leonid Nazarenko (until June) valeri Tretyakov (June to September); Anatoli Nefyodov (from September)
FC Lada-Simbirsk Dimitrovgrad	Vladimir Yevsyukov (until May); Vladimir Mukhanov (May to September); Valeri Denisov (from September)
FC Dynamo Stavropol	Fyodor Gagloyev (until September); Sergei Gorb (from September)
FC Spartak-Orekhovo Orekhovo-Zuyevo	Sergey Frantsev (until October); Vadim Khnykin (from October)

== Standings ==
Pos	Team	Pld	W	D	L	GF	GA	GD	Pts	Promotion or relegation
1	Anzhi Makhachkala (P)	42	26	8	8	55	20	+35	86	Promotion to Top Division
2	Fakel Voronezh (P)	42	26	7	9	65	31	+34	85	Promotion to Top Division
3	Sokol Saratov	42	25	7	10	74	39	+35	82	
4	Torpedo-ZIL Moscow	42	23	13	6	67	27	+40	82	
5	Baltika Kaliningrad	42	22	8	12	60	37	+23	74	
6	Amkar Perm	42	20	10	12	65	49	+16	70	
7	Rubin Kazan	42	18	12	12	56	49	+7	66	
8	Gazovik-Gazprom Izhevsk	42	20	4	18	50	47	+3	64	
9	Arsenal Tula	42	19	7	16	61	51	+10	64	
10	Lokomotiv Chita	42	19	5	18	48	50	−2	62	
11	Kristall Smolensk	42	17	7	18	44	49	−5	58	
12	Tom Tomsk	42	17	7	18	48	54	−6	58	
13	Spartak Nalchik	42	17	5	20	49	61	−12	56	
14	Metallurg Krasnoyarsk	42	14	12	16	38	43	−5	54	
15	Metallurg Lipetsk	42	15	8	19	51	53	−2	53	
16	Lokomotiv St. Petersburg	42	14	9	19	35	51	−16	51	
17	Volgar-Gazprom Astrakhan	42	14	8	20	41	49	−8	50	
18	Tyumen (R)	42	13	9	20	43	59	−16	48	Relegation to Second Division
19	Torpedo-Viktoriya Nizhny Novgorod (R)	42	11	10	21	47	67	−20	43	Relegation to Second Division
20	Lada-Simbirsk Dimitrovgrad (Note: FC Lada-Grad Dimitrovgrad renamed to FC Lada-Simbirsk.) (R)	42	12	4	26	37	66	−29	40 (Note: Dynamo Stavropol awarded 3-0 victory in their home game against Lada-Simbirsk Dimitrovgrad. Lada-Simbirsk did not arrive for the game as they were considering dropping out of the league altogether at the time before receiving last-second financing commitments.)	Relegation to Second Division
21	Dynamo Stavropol (R)	42	10	9	23	28	50	−22	39	Relegation to Second Division
22	Spartak-Orekhovo Orekhovo-Zuyevo (R)	42	2	7	33	25	85	−60	13	Relegation to Second Division

Source: RSSSF
(P) Promoted; (R) Relegated

== Results ==
Home \ Away	AMK	ANZ	ARS	BAL	DST	FAK	KRI	GGI	LAD	LCH	LSP	MKR	MTL	RUB	SOK	SPN	SPO	TOM	TVN	TZM	TYU	VOL
Amkar Perm		0–1	4–1	1–0	3–0	3–1	1–2	1–1	3–0	3–1	2–0	2–2	3–1	4–3	0–1	1–0	4–1	0–0	2–0	3–2	3–0	1–0
Anzhi Makhachkala	5–0		1–0	2–0	2–0	1–0	2–1	2–0	3–1	1–0	2–0	0–0	1–0	2–1	1–0	5–0	0–0	1–0	3–0	1–0	1–0	1–0
Arsenal Tula	2–2	1–0		1–2	2–0	2–3	1–0	3–2	4–0	2–0	4–0	0–0	1–0	5–0	1–1	3–1	3–2	3–1	4–1	0–3	3–0	2–1
Baltika Kaliningrad	1–0	1–0	1–1		0–0	1–1	3–0	2–0	1–0	6–0	2–0	1–0	1–0	3–2	2–0	1–0	3–0	3–0	4–1	1–1	0–2	2–0
Dynamo Stavropol	0–2	1–0	0–0	2–1		0–1	0–0	1–2	3–0	2–1	1–0	1–0	0–0	1–1	0–2	1–2	3–1	1–1	1–1	0–1	0–2	2–0
Fakel Voronezh	0–0	1–0	1–0	2–1	2–1		3–0	2–1	4–0	3–0	0–0	4–1	3–0	2–3	2–0	1–0	3–1	2–0	2–0	1–0	2–1	2–0
Kristall Smolensk	4–0	0–2	1–0	0–1	3–1	0–2		1–0	1–0	3–1	2–1	1–0	1–0	0–1	1–2	6–2	1–0	3–1	1–1	1–2	0–0	2–1
Gazovik-Gazprom	2–1	1–2	3–1	2–0	1–0	0–3	0–0		0–1	1–0	1–0	2–0	1–0	1–0	1–0	3–0	2–0	1–2	2–1	3–0	2–1	2–2
Lada-Simbirsk Dimitrovgrad	2–0	1–2	3–1	1–2	0–0	1–0	0–0	2–1		2–0	0–2	2–1	4–1	1–2	1–1	0–2	0–0	3–0	2–0	0–2	4–0	1–2
Lokomotiv Chita	0–1	0–0	1–1	1–0	0–2	2–1	4–0	2–0	3–0		2–1	1–1	3–0	3–0	0–2	2–0	1–0	2–0	1–0	1–0	1–2	1–0
Lokomotiv St. Petersburg	1–0	0–0	0–1	1–1	4–1	0–0	0–1	1–0	1–0	3–2		1–1	1–0	0–0	1–2	1–0	1–0	3–1	2–1	0–3	1–0	0–0
Metallurg Krasnoyarsk	0–0	0–0	2–3	1–0	1–0	2–1	2–0	1–2	2–0	1–2	2–1		0–0	2–1	0–1	1–0	2–1	2–0	2–0	0–0	1–0	0–0
Metallurg Lipetsk	1–1	0–2	0–1	4–0	2–0	1–0	1–0	1–0	3–0	0–0	3–1	2–1		1–2	2–2	0–0	3–0	3–1	1–1	3–3	3–0	4–0
Rubin Kazan	0–0	2–0	4–0	2–2	1–0	0–0	1–1	2–1	1–0	1–1	2–0	2–1	2–1		2–2	4–2	2–0	0–2	3–1	0–0	0–0	1–0
Sokol Saratov	1–3	2–2	2–0	2–1	1–0	1–0	5–1	0–1	4–3	3–0	2–0	0–0	2–1	1–0		2–0	8–0	4–2	2–0	1–1	3–1	3–0
Spartak Nalchik	4–1	1–1	1–0	0–1	2–2	1–1	1–0	0–3	2–0	2–0	3–1	2–1	2–1	2–1	2–1		1–0	1–0	3–0	0–0	1–2	0–1
Spartak-Orekhovo	1–4	0–2	0–2	1–3	3–1	0–1	0–2	0–0	1–2	1–3	1–2	1–2	0–1	2–2	0–1	2–3		0–0	1–1	1–3	3–2	1–2
Tom Tomsk	3–3	1–0	2–1	2–1	1–0	2–0	2–1	3–0	3–0	1–2	0–0	1–2	4–2	1–2	2–1	1–3	1–0		1–1	1–0	0–1	0–0
Torpedo-Viktoriya	1–2	2–2	1–0	2–1	1–0	1–2	3–1	3–2	3–0	0–1	1–1	3–0	1–3	2–0	0–3	3–0	1–0	0–1		0–0	5–3	2–2
Torpedo-ZIL Moscow	2–0	1–0	1–1	2–2	2–0	1–1	1–0	4–0	3–0	2–0	4–0	3–1	5–0	1–0	1–0	3–2	0–0	2–0	3–0		1–1	1–1
Tyumen	1–0	1–2	2–0	0–0	0–3	3–4	1–1	0–2	3–0	1–0	0–3	0–0	3–1	1–1	2–0	1–0	5–0	0–2	1–1	0–1		0–0
Volgar-Gazprom	1–1	1–0	2–0	0–2	1–0	0–1	0–1	2–1	2–0	1–3	3–0	2–0	0–1	0–2	2–3	3–1	2–0	0–2	2–1	1–2	4–0	

Legend: Blue = home team win; Yellow = draw; Red = away team win.

== Top goalscorers ==
Rank	Player	Team	Goals
1	(Russia) Konstantin Paramonov	Amkar	23
2	(Georgia (country)) Mikheil Jishkariani	Sokol	20
3	(Brazil) Andradina	Arsenal	18
4	(Russia) Andrei Fedkov	Baltika	16
5	(Russia) Andrei Bakalets	Torpedo-Viktoriya	14
5	(Russia) Vadim Belokhonov	Metallurg (Kr)	14
5	(Russia) Sergei Bulatov	Fakel	14
5	(Georgia (country)) Vaso Sepashvili	Spartak	14
9	(Russia) Nail Galimov	Lokomotiv (Ch)	13
9	(Russia) Andrei Knyazev	Rubin / Torpedo-ZIL	13

== See also ==
- 1999 Russian Top Division
- 1999 Russian Second Division
