= Salekh Abdulkayumov =

Russian footballer and coach

Personal information
- Full name: Salekh Fatekhovich Abdulkayumov
- Date of birth: 13 April 1961 (age 65)
- Place of birth: Dzerzhinsk, Russian SFSR
- Height: 1.83 m (6 ft 0 in)
- Positions: Forward; midfielder

Senior career*
Years	Team	Apps	(Gls)
1986	FC Spartak Tambov	3	(1)
1988	FC Uralan Elista	38	(20)
1989–1992	FC Torpedo Ryazan	148	(47)
1993	FC Obninsk	41	(32)
1994–1995	FC Avangard-Kortek Kolomna	54	(18)
1996–1997	FC Spartak Ryazan	79	(26)
1998	FC Lokomotiv-Taym Mineralnye Vody	13	(4)
1999	FC Spartak Ryazan	33	(7)
- * Club domestic league appearances and goals

Salekh Fatekhovich Abdulkayumov (Russian: Салех Фатехович Абдулкаюмов; born 13 April 1961) is a Russian professional football coach and a former player.

== Club career ==
He made his Russian Football National League debut for FC Torpedo Ryazan on 25 April 1992 in a game against FC Zenit Izhevsk.

== Honours ==
- Russian Second Division Zone 4 top scorer: 1993 (32 goals).
