= Igor Perminov =

Russian footballer

Personal information
- Full name: Igor Viktorovich Perminov
- Date of birth: 13 April 1975 (age 51)
- Height: 1.89 m (6 ft 2 1/2 in)
- Position: Defender

Youth career
- FC Luch Vladivostok

Senior career*
Years	Team	Apps	(Gls)
1991–1996	FC Luch Vladivostok	67	(4)
1997	FC Zhemchuzhina Sochi	0	(0)
1998	FC Chkalovets Novosibirsk	0	(0)
2000	FC Oryol	34	(3)
2001	FC Selenga Ulan-Ude	13	(2)
2001–2002	FC Luch Vladivostok	32	(1)
2003	FC Selenga Ulan-Ude	5	(0)
2003–2004	FC Portovik-Energiya Kholmsk (amateur)		
2005	FC Metallurg-Metiznik Magnitogorsk	35	(0)
2006–2008	FC Tyumen	57	(1)
- * Club domestic league appearances and goals

Igor Viktorovich Perminov (Russian: Игорь Викторович Перминов; born 13 April 1975) is a former Russian football player.
