= Andrei Sitchikhin =

Russian footballer and coach

Personal information
- Full name: Andrei Anatolyevich Sitchikhin
- Date of birth: 15 August 1974 (age 52)
- Place of birth: Nizhnekamsk, Russian SFSR
- Height: 1.78 m (5 ft 10 in)
- Position: Midfielder

Team information
- Current team: FC Rubin Kazan (U-21 asst manager)

Senior career*
Years	Team	Apps	(Gls)
1991–2005	FC Neftekhimik Nizhnekamsk	428	(28)
2005	FC Tobol	9	(0)

Managerial career
- 2006–2007: FC Neftekhimik Nizhnekamsk (assistant)
- 2010: FC Neftekhimik Nizhnekamsk (assistant)
- 2011–2013: FC Neftekhimik Nizhnekamsk
- 2014–2015: FC Neftekhimik Nizhnekamsk
- 2015–2016: FC Neftekhimik Nizhnekamsk (assistant)
- 2016–2017: FC Rubin Kazan (U-21 assistant)
- * Club domestic league appearances and goals

Andrei Anatolyevich Sitchikhin (Russian: Андрей Анатольевич Ситчихин; born 15 August 1974) is a Russian professional football coach and a former player.

== Club career ==
As a player, he made his debut in the Soviet Second League B in 1991 for FC Neftekhimik Nizhnekamsk. He played 10 seasons in the Russian Football National League for Neftekhimik.
