= Sergey Kovalyov (disambiguation) =

Sergei Kovalev (1930–2021) was a Russian human rights activist.

Sergei Kovalev, Sergei Kovalyov or variations may also refer to:

- Sergey Kovalev (born 1983), Russian boxer
- Sergey Kovalev (historian) (1886–1960), Soviet historian
- Sergei Kovalyov (footballer, born 1965), Russian footballer
- Sergei Kovalyov (footballer, born 1972), Russian footballer
- Sergei Nikitich Kovalev (1919–2011), Russian submarine designer
