= Roman Gapotiy =

Russian footballer

Personal information
- Full name: Roman Valentinovich Gapotiy
- Date of birth: 15 February 1970 (age 56)
- Height: 1.77 m (5 ft 9 1/2 in)
- Position: Midfielder

Youth career
- ROShISP-10 Rostov-on-Don

Senior career*
Years	Team	Apps	(Gls)
1989	ShVSM Rostov-on-Don		
1990	FC SKA Rostov-on-Don	15	(0)
1990–1991	FC APK Azov	55	(8)
1992	FC Asmaral Kislovodsk	33	(3)
1993	FC APK Azov	11	(0)
1993–1995	FC Krylia Sovetov Samara	17	(0)
1995–2004	FC Vodnik Rostov-on-Don		
2005	FC Progress Rostov-on-Don		
2006	FC Vodnik Rostov-on-Don		
- * Club domestic league appearances and goals

Roman Valentinovich Gapotiy (Russian: Роман Валентинович Гапотий; born 15 February 1970) is a former Russian football player.
