= Aristid Panaiotidi =

Russian footballer

Personal information
- Full name: Aristid Georgiyevich Panaiotidi
- Date of birth: 28 February 1971 (age 55)
- Place of birth: Moscow, Russian SFSR
- Height: 1.76 m (5 ft 9 1/2 in)
- Position: Goalkeeper

Youth career
- FC Dynamo Moscow

Senior career*
Years	Team	Apps	(Gls)
1989–1991	FC Iskra Smolensk	29	(0)
1991	FC Volga Tver	21	(0)
1992	FC Dynamo-Gazovik Tyumen	7	(0)
1992–1993	FC Torpedo Ryazan	38	(0)
1994	Panionios	10	(0)
1995	FC Spartak Ryazan	12	(0)
1996	FC CSK VVS-Kristall Smolensk	0	(0)
1996–1998	FC Spartak Moscow	0	(0)
1996–1998	→ FC Spartak-d Moscow (loan)	34	(0)
1999	FC Torgmash Lyubertsy (amateur)		
2001	FC Bremen-Ramenye (amateur)		
2001	FC Shatura (amateur)		
2002	FC Mika	1	(0)
- * Club domestic league appearances and goals

Aristid Georgiyevich Panaiotidi (Russian: Аристид Георгиевич Панаиотиди; born 28 February 1971) is a former Russian football player.

Panaiotidi played in the Russian Top League with FC Dynamo-Gazovik Tyumen.

He worked as a technical director for FC Dynamo Moscow in the late 2000s.
