= Soviet Second League B =

Association football league in the Soviet Union

The Soviet Second League B or Soviet Lower Second League was an auxiliary fourth tier of the Soviet league system, because it was not consistent as it existed only for six seasons and somewhat randomly. It was the fourth highest division of Soviet football, below the Soviet Second League.

== Description ==
It was introduced initially for three seasons (two tiers) at the inception of Soviet league football in 1936 as the "Group G" until 1938 when all teams were allowed to compete in one Super League. At that time it consisted of a single group. At the first championships two of them occurred in 1936, it contained around five teams. In 1937 the league was increased to 12 participants. Also the same year another division was added that was lower than the Group G, called the Group D. Group D included two groups – one regular and another with the name "Cities of the East". The regular group consisted of 11 teams, while "Cities of the East" involved participation of only seven teams. The champions of the Group G became two teams: twice it was won by Traktor Factory Kharkiv (later Torpedo Kharkiv) and Traktor Stalingrad. In 1938 the league was discontinued.

Later it was revived in 1970 for just one season as the extension of the second League and under the name "Class B". It was divided into four republican sub-leagues: Russia, Ukraine, Kazakhstan, and Middle Asia. The Russian sub-league was divided further into four zones with five sub-groups. Number of participating clubs varied between 17 and 18. The Ukrainian sub-league contained two zones: one consisting of 13 clubs, another – 14. The Kazakhstani sub-league had 16 clubs participating and the Asian sub-league – 18. The total participants amounted to 149 clubs. Nine clubs from each zones were promoted, the rest attained status of amateurs. The league champions were: Russia – Motor Vladimir, Terek Grozny, Kord Balakovo, Sakhalin Yuzhno-Sakhalinsk; Ukraine – Khimik Severodonetsk; Kazakhstan – Tsementnik Semipalatinsk; Asia – Zarafshan Navoi from Zarafshan.

In 1990, the league was recreated to contain the nine regional zones that were previously a part of Soviet Second League, and an additional 10th zone (as well as replacement teams for those previously promoted were added). It was named as the Second Lower League. Later it was referred to as the Second League, while the Second League was renamed into the Buffer League. The winners of the zones would qualify for the Soviet Second League (Buffer League). Most notably, the 1st Zone represented Ukraine, 2nd – Armenia, 3rd – Azerbaijan, 4th – Southern Russia, 5th – Central Russia, Moldova, Belarus (later moved to the 6th), 6th – Baltic Russia, Baltic states, Moscow, 7th – Volga region, 8th Zone – Kazakhstan, 9th – Uzbekistan, 10th – Russia's Far East.

Note: major reorganizations of the League system took place in 1970, before introduction of the UEFA Cup and All-European League ranking, and later in 1989, before fall of the Soviet Union.

== Names ==
- 1936–1937 Group G
- 1950-1970 Class B
- 1990–1991 Second League

== Top teams ==
Season	Winner	Runners-up	Notes
1936 (spring)	Traktornyi zavod Kharkiv	Krylya Sovetov Moscow; Dynamo Pyatigorsk	
1936 (fall)	Traktornyi zavod Kharkiv	Stal Dnipropetrovsk; Lokomotyv Kyiv	
1937	Traktor Stalingrad	Iskra Smolensk; Krylya Sovetov Moscow	
1937–1969			disbanded
1970	Motor Vladimir (Russia); Terek Grozny (Russia); FC Kord Balakovo (Russia); Sakhalin Yuzhno-Sakhalinsk (Russia); Khimik Severodonetsk (Ukraine); Tsementnik Semipalatinsk (Kazakhstan); Zarafshon Nawoyi (Central Asia)	Spartak Kostroma (Russia); FC Spartak Ryazan (Russia); Neftianik Tumen (Russia); Vulkan Petropavlovsk‑Kamtchatski (Russia); Lokomotyv Vinnytsia (Ukraine); Traktor Pavlodar (Kazakhstan); Janguier (Central Asia)	seven zones, four in RSFSR
1971–1989			League discontinued
1990	Torpedo Zaporizhia (Ukraine); Ararat-2 Yerevan (Armenia); Qarabağ Ağdam (Azerbaijan); Torpedo Taganrog (Russian South); Asmaral Moscow (Center); Volga Tver (North/Moscow); KamAZ Naberezhnye Chelny (Volga/Ural); Vostok Ust-Kamenogorsk (Kazakhstan); Nuravshon Bukhoro (Central Asia); Sakhalin Yuzhno-Sakhalinsk (Far East)	Sudobudivnyk Mykolaiv (Ukraine); Arax Oktembyeryan (Armenia); Khazar Sumgait (Azerbaijan); APK Azov (Russian South); Tighina Bendery (Center); KIM Vitebsk (North/Moscow); Lada Togliatti (Volga/Ural); Zhetysu Taldy‑Kurgan (Kazakhstan); Kasansaets Kosonsoy (Central Asia); Lokomotiv Chita (Far East)	10 zones
1991	Naftovyk Okhtyrka (Ukraine); Syunik Kapan (Armenia); Khazar Sumgait (Azerbaijan); Zhemchuzhina Sochi (Russian South); Spartak Anapa (Center); Prometei-Dynamo Saint Petersburg (North/Moscow); Rubin Kazan (Volga/Ural); Aktubenets Aktubinsk (Kazakhstan); Traktor Tashkent (Central Asia); Lokomotiv Chita (Far East)	Prykarpattia Ivano-Frankivsk (Ukraine); Shirak Gyumri (Armenia); Stroitel Baku (Azerbaijan); Uralan Elista (Russian South); Svetotekhnika Saransk (Center); Textilschik Ivanovo (North/Moscow); Metallurg Magnitogorsk (Volga/Ural); Spartak Semipalatinsk (Kazakhstan); Umid Tashkent (Central Asia); SKA Khabarovsk (Far East)	10 zones, last championship
