= Aleksandr Alfyorov =

Russian footballer (born 1962)

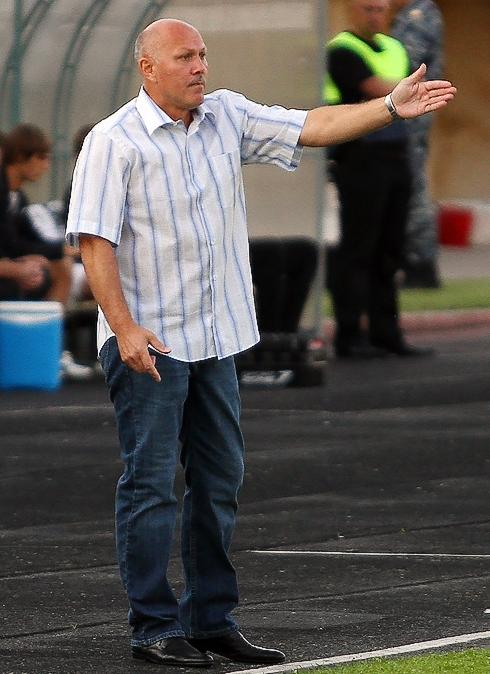

Personal information
- Full name: Aleksandr Mikhaylovich Alfyorov
- Date of birth: 2 November 1962 (age 63)
- Place of birth: Kabansk, Buryatia, Russian SFSR
- Height: 1.72 m (5 ft 8 in)
- Position: Forward

Senior career*
Years	Team	Apps	(Gls)
1982–1986	Selenga Ulan-Ude	118	(24)
1987	Iskra Smolensk	33	(3)
1988–1990	Selenga Ulan-Ude	89	(18)
1991	Sakhalin Kholmsk	41	(13)
1992	Zvezda-Yunis-Sib Irkutsk	30	(12)
1993	Selenga Ulan-Ude	27	(7)
1994	Shenyang Liuyao	22	(3)
1995	Selenga Ulan-Ude	2	(1)
1995–1996	Shenyang Huayang	44	(7)
1997	Selenga Ulan-Ude	33	(2)
1998–2001	Metallurg Krasnoyarsk	84	(8)

Managerial career
- 2001: Metallurg Krasnoyarsk (caretaker)
- 2001–2002: Metallurg Krasnoyarsk (assistant)
- 2002: Metallurg Krasnoyarsk (caretaker)
- 2002: Metallurg Krasnoyarsk (assistant)
- 2002: Metallurg Krasnoyarsk (caretaker)
- 2003: Metallurg Krasnoyarsk
- 2004–2006: Metallurg Krasnoyarsk (assistant)
- 2007: Metallurg Krasnoyarsk
- 2007–2010: Metallurg-Yenisey Krasnoyarsk (assistant)
- 2010–2013: Yenisey Krasnoyarsk
- 2014–2015: Baikal Irkutsk
- 2015–2016: Sakhalin Yuzhno-Sakhalinsk
- 2017–2019: Luch Vladivostok (assistant)
- 2018: Luch Vladivostok (caretaker)
- 2019–2020: Yenisey Krasnoyarsk (scout)
- 2020–2021: Yenisey Krasnoyarsk
- 2021–2022: Yenisey Krasnoyarsk (academy)
- 2022–2023: Yenisey Krasnoyarsk (assistant)
- * Club domestic league appearances and goals

Aleksandr Mikhaylovich Alfyorov (Russian: Александр Михайлович Алфёров; born 2 November 1962) is a Russian professional football manager and a former player.

== Honours ==
- Russian Second Division, Zone East best coach: 2010.
