= Maksim Dubovik =

Russian footballer

Personal information
- Full name: Maksim Nikolayevich Dubovik
- Date of birth: 17 April 1973 (age 53)
- Height: 1.89 m (6 ft 2 1/2 in)
- Position: Midfielder

Youth career
- FC Luch Vladivostok

Senior career*
| Years | Team | Apps | (Gls) |
| 1990–1993 | FC Luch Vladivostok | 85 | (12) |
| 1994 | FC Portovik Vladivostok | | |
| 1995–1996 | FC Luch Vladivostok | 68 | (5) |
| 1997–1998 | FC Samotlor-XXI Nizhnevartovsk | 47 | (3) |
| 1998 | FC Chkalovets Novosibirsk | 9 | (0) |
| 1999 | FC Samotlor-XXI Nizhnevartovsk | 23 | (2) |
| 2000 | FC Oryol | 33 | (7) |
| 2001 | FC Selenga Ulan-Ude | 11 | (1) |
| 2001–2002 | FC Luch Vladivostok | 44 | (1) |
| 2003 | FC Lokomotiv Ussuriysk (amateur) | | |
| 2004–2005 | FC Churkin-United Vladivostok | | |
| 2009–2010 | FC Fortuna Vladivostok | | |
| 2011 | FC Portovik Vladivostok | | |
- * Club domestic league appearances and goals

Maksim Nikolayevich Dubovik (Russian: Максим Николаевич Дубовик; born 17 April 1973) is a former Russian football player.
