= Sergei Chernov =

Russian footballer

Personal information
- Full name: Sergei Anatolyevich Chernov
- Date of birth: 2 November 1968 (age 57)
- Position: Midfielder

Senior career*
Years	Team	Apps	(Gls)
1990–1991	FC Metallurg Novokuznetsk	27	(3)
1992	FC Shakhtyor Severny Maganak		
1993–1996	FC Metallurg-ZapSib Novokuznetsk	104	(50)
1997–2000	FC Shakhtyor Prokopyevsk (amateur)		

Managerial career
- 2005–2006: FC Baltika Kaliningrad (director)
- * Club domestic league appearances and goals

Sergei Anatolyevich Chernov (Russian: Серге́й Анатольевич Чернов; born 2 November 1968) is a former Russian professional football player.

== Club career ==
He played in the Russian Football National League for FC Metallurg Novokuznetsk in 1993.

== Honours ==
- Russian Second Division Zone East top scorer: 1995 (21 goals).
