= Sergei Nedosekin =

Russian footballer and coach

Personal information
- Full name: Sergei Ivanovich Nedosekin
- Date of birth: May 1, 1947 (age 79)
- Positions: Midfielder; forward

Senior career*
Years	Team	Apps	(Gls)
1968	FC Zvezda Ryazan	1	(0)
1971–1973	FC Spartak Ryazan	85	(6)
1975	FC Spartak Ryazan	31	(3)

Managerial career
- 1984: FC Spartak Ryazan (director)
- 1988–1998: FC Spartak Ryazan
- 1997: FC Spartak Ryazan (director)
- 1998: FC Spartak Lukhovitsy
- * Club domestic league appearances and goals

Sergei Ivanovich Nedosekin (Russian: Серге́й Иванович Недосекин; born May 1, 1947) is a Russian professional football coach and a former player.

== Career ==
Born in Uzlovsky District, Tula Oblast, Nedosekin began playing amateur football as a forward for a local club in Skopin after studying at university. In 1966, he joined FC Spartak Ryazan where he played over 400 league matches over 13 seasons in the Soviet leagues.

After he retired from playing, Nedosekin managed FC Spartak Ryazan, leading the club to a second place finish in the 1992 Russian First League.
