= Anatoly Bulgakov (footballer, born 1944) =

Russian footballer and coach

Personal information
- Full name: Anatoly Nikolayevich Bulgakov
- Date of birth: 18 July 1944 (age 82)
- Positions: Midfielder; striker

Senior career*
Years	Team	Apps	(Gls)
1968–1971	FC Torpedo Taganrog		
1972	FC Uralan Elista		

Managerial career
- 1981–1982: FC Torpedo Taganrog
- 1989: FC Luch Azov
- 1992: FC Torpedo Taganrog
- 1994: FC Torpedo Taganrog (assistant)
- 1994–1998: FC Torpedo Taganrog
- 1999: FC Zvezda Irkutsk
- 2000–2001: FC Lokomotiv Liski
- 2005–2006: FC Taganrog
- * Club domestic league appearances and goals

Anatoly Nikolayevich Bulgakov (Russian: Анатолий Николаевич Булгаков; born 18 July 1944) is a Russian professional football coach and a former player.

Bulgakov played in the Soviet First League with FC Torpedo Taganrog.
