= Yevgeni Saprykin =

Russian footballer

Personal information
- Full name: Yevgeni Aleksandrovich Saprykin
- Date of birth: 18 April 1970 (age 56)
- Place of birth: Donetsk, Ukrainian SSR
- Date of death: January 2015
- Height: 1.72 m (5 ft 7 1/2 in)
- Position: Forward

Youth career
- FC SKA Rostov-on-Don

Senior career*
Years	Team	Apps	(Gls)
1989	FC Artyomovets Shakhty		
1990	FC Uralan Elista	32	(14)
1991–1992	FC Spartak Anapa	76	(39)
1993	FC Spartak Vladikavkaz	29	(5)
1994	FC Metalurh Zaporizhya	29	(7)
1995	FC Uralan Elista	22	(5)
1996	FC Spartak Anapa	16	(4)
1996	FC Zorya Luhansk	13	(4)
1997	FK Ventspils	24	(5)
1997–1998	Constructorul Chişinău	2	(0)
2001	FC Sibiryak Bratsk	28	(2)
- * Club domestic league appearances and goals

Yevgeni Aleksandrovich Saprykin (Russian: Евгений Александрович Сапрыкин; born 18 April 1970; died in January 2015) was a Russian professional football player.

== Club career ==
He played 1 game in the UEFA Cup 1993–94 for FC Spartak Vladikavkaz.
