= Viktor Slesarev =

Russian footballer and manager (1949–2022)

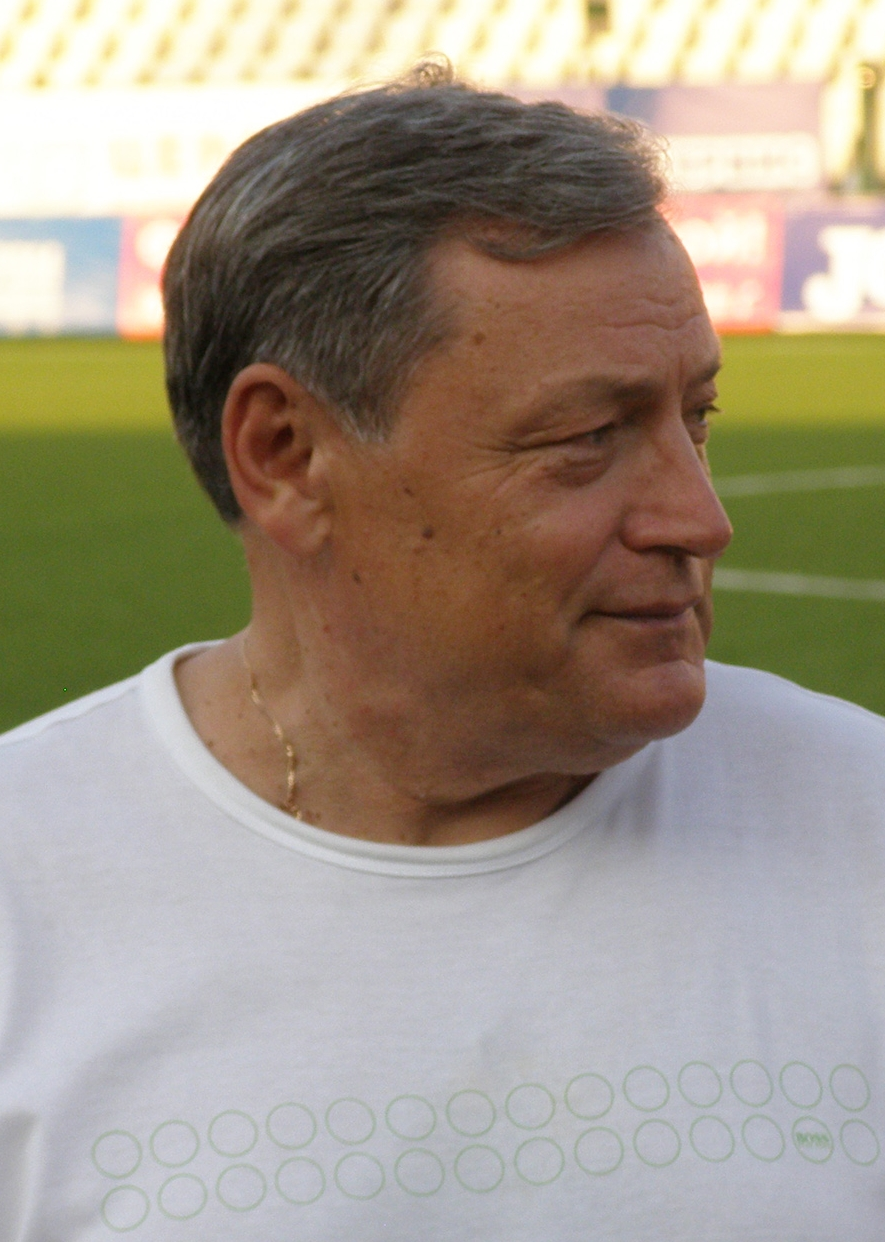
- Slesarev in 2014

Personal information
- Full name: Viktor Yefimovich Slesarev
- Date of birth: 5 August 1949
- Place of birth: Sterlitamak, Bashkir ASSR, Russian SFSR, USSR
- Date of death: 14 July 2022 (aged 72)
- Place of death: Perm, Russia
- Height: 1.76 m (5 ft 9 in)
- Positions: Defender; midfielder

Senior career*
Years	Team	Apps	(Gls)
1966–1968	Kauchuk Sterlitamak		
1969	Shakhtyor Kumertau		
1969	Stroitel Ufa	8	(1)
1970	SKA Khabarovsk	23	(1)
1970	Gornyak Raychikhinsk		
1971	Stroitel Ashkhabad	0	(0)
1972–1973	SKA Khabarovsk	66	(3)
1974–1979	Zvezda Perm	147	(8)

Managerial career
- 1981–1982: Zvezda Perm (assistant)
- 1983–1994: Zvezda Perm
- 1995–1996: Gazovik-Gazprom Izhevsk
- 1998–1999: Gazovik-Gazprom Izhevsk
- 2000: Shenyang Haishi (assistant)
- 2001: Gazovik-Gazprom Izhevsk
- 2002: Shandong Taishan (assistant)
- 2002–2003: Gazovik-Gazprom Izhevsk
- 2005–2006: SOYUZ-Gazprom Izhevsk
- 2011–2015: Amkar Perm (director of youth development)
- * Club domestic league appearances and goals

Viktor Yefimovich Slesarev (Russian: Виктор Ефимович Слесарев; 5 August 1949 – 14 July 2022) was a Russian football player and manager.
