= Aleksandr Irkhin =

Russian footballer (1954–2019)

- Irkhin in 2017

Personal information
- Full name: Aleksandr Sergeyevich Irkhin
- Date of birth: 10 January 1954
- Place of birth: Azov, Soviet Union
- Date of death: 18 May 2019 (aged 65)
- Place of death: Moscow, Russia

Managerial career
- Years: Team
- 1981–1983: FC Atommash Volgodonsk (assistant)
- 1984–1987: FC Atommash Volgodonsk
- 1989: FC Spartak Ordzhonikidze (assistant)
- 1990: FC APK Azov (assistant)
- 1990: FC APK Azov
- 1991: FC Podillya Khmelnytskyi
- 1991: FC Shakhtyor Shakhty (director)
- 1992: FC APK Azov
- 1992: FC Dynamo Stavropol
- 1993: FC Interros Moscow
- 1994: FC Lada Togliatti
- 1994: FC Spartak Shchyolkovo
- 1995–1997: FC Tyumen
- 1998: FC Spartak Lukhovitsy
- 1998: FC Rubin Kazan
- 2000: FC Spartak-Chukotka Moscow (assistant)
- 2000: FC Uralan Elista
- 2000: FC Metallurg Krasnoyarsk
- 2000–2001: FC Kuban Krasnodar
- 2001–2002: FC Metallurg Krasnoyarsk
- 2002: FC Kristall Smolensk
- 2003: FC Astana-1964
- 2004–2005: FC Fakel Voronezh
- 2007–2008: FC Astana-1964
- 2008: FC Torpedo-RG Moscow
- 2009: FC Chernomorets Novorossiysk
- 2016: FC StArs Kolomensky District
- 2016–2017: FC Khimki
- 2017–2018: FC Khimki

Aleksandr Sergeyevich Irkhin (Russian: Александр Сергеевич Ирхин; 10 January 1954 – 18 May 2019) was a professional Russian football coach.

== Honours ==
=== As a coach ===
FC Astana-1964

- Kazakhstan Cup: 2003
- Kazakhstan Premier League: 2003 (3rd place)
