= Vladimir Filimonov =

Russian footballer (born 1965)

Personal information
- Full name: Vladimir Nikolayevich Filimonov
- Date of birth: 21 July 1965 (age 61)
- Place of birth: Perm, Russian SFSR
- Height: 1.82 m (5 ft 11 1/2 in)
- Position: Forward

Youth career
- FC Zvezda Perm

Senior career*
Years	Team	Apps	(Gls)
1986–1988	FC Zvezda Perm	94	(14)
1989	FC Rotor Volgograd	2	(0)
1989	FC Alga Frunze	32	(24)
1990–1993	FC Zvezda Perm	148	(97)
1994–1995	FC Zhemchuzhina Sochi	47	(11)
1996	FC Gazovik-Gazprom Izhevsk	17	(1)
1996–1997	FC Energiya Chaikovsky	55	(40)
1998	FC Kuzbass Kemerovo	13	(5)
1999	FC Vostok-Altyn	5	(1)
2000	FC Luch Vladivostok	14	(1)
2001	FC Terek Grozny	0	(0)
2002	FC Nart Cherkessk (amateur)		
- * Club domestic league appearances and goals

Vladimir Nikolayevich Filimonov (Russian: Владимир Николаевич Филимонов; born 21 July 1965) is a former Russian professional football player.

== Honours ==
- Russian First League top scorer: 37 goals (Zone Center, 1993).
