= Vyacheslav Kartashov =

Russian footballer

Personal information
- Full name: Vyacheslav Aleksandrovich Kartashov
- Date of birth: 24 August 1966 (age 60)
- Height: 1.92 m (6 ft 3 1/2 in)
- Positions: Striker; defender

Youth career
- DYuSSh Yermak

Senior career*
Years	Team	Apps	(Gls)
1983	FC Ekibastuzets	0	(0)
1987	FC Traktor Pavlodar	6	(0)
1989	FC Alyuminshchik Pavlodar		
1990–1991	FC Metallurg Yermak	60	(35)
1992–2000	FC Irtysh Omsk	221	(55)
- * Club domestic league appearances and goals

Vyacheslav Aleksandrovich Kartashov (Russian: Вячеслав Александрович Карташов; born 24 August 1966) is a former Russian professional football player.

== Club career ==
He made his Russian Football National League debut for FC Irtysh Omsk on 6 May 1992 in a game against FC Selenga Ulan-Ude. He played 6 seasons in the FNL for Irtysh.

== Honours ==
- Russian First League Zone East top scorer: 1992 (19 goals).
