= Aleksandr Muzyka =

Russian footballer

Personal information
- Full name: Aleksandr Nikolayevich Muzyka
- Date of birth: 26 February 1969 (age 57)
- Place of birth: Khabarovsk, Russian SFSR
- Height: 1.77 m (5 ft 9 1/2 in)
- Position: Forward

Youth career
- FC Zarya Khabarovsk

Senior career*
Years	Team	Apps	(Gls)
1991	FC Lokomotiv Ussuriysk (amateur)		
1992–1993	FC Dynamo Yakutsk	54	(17)
1994	FC Uralmash Yekaterinburg	4	(0)
1994	→ FC Uralmash-d Yekaterinburg (loan)	22	(14)
1995	FC Dynamo Yakutsk	0	(0)
1995–1997	FC Okean Nakhodka	40	(8)
1997	FC SKA Khabarovsk	0	(0)
- * Club domestic league appearances and goals

Aleksandr Nikolayevich Muzyka (Russian: Александр Николаевич Музыка; born 26 February 1969) is a former Russian football player.
