= Artur Shamrin =

Soviet-born Russian footballer (1969–2026)

Personal information
- Full name: Artur Vitalyevich Shamrin
- Date of birth: 6 February 1969
- Place of birth: Lipetsk, Russian SFSR, USSR
- Date of death: c. 16 January 2026 (aged 56)
- Place of death: Lipetsk, Russia
- Height: 1.78 m (5 ft 10 in)
- Position: Forward

Youth career
- 1986–1987: Spartak Moscow

Senior career*
Years	Team	Apps	(Gls)
1988–1989	SKA Odessa	56	(5)
1990–1991	Lokomotiv Moscow	30	(9)
1992–1993	Metallurg Lipetsk	64	(22)
1994–1995	Druzhba Maykop	45	(7)
- * Club domestic league appearances and goals

Artur Vitalyevich Shamrin (Russian: Артур Витальевич Шамрин; 6 February 1969 – c. 16 January 2026) was a Soviet and Russian football player.

== Career ==
Born in Lipetsk, Shamrin learned to play football in the youth academy of FC Metallurg, a hometown team competing in the third tier of Soviet league system. On 23 May 1984, he made his debut for the senior team at just 15 years old, becoming the youngest debutant in the club's history, as well as one of the youngest players in Soviet football. Despite not making any further appearances that year, Shamrin played regularly in the next two seasons. In the summer of 1986, he joined Spartak Moscow's reserves. He, however, failed to make his debut in the Soviet top division and was even expelled from the club for disciplinary reasons by the end of 1987.

At the time of his expulsion from Spartak, Shamrin was 18 years old and subject to conscription into the Soviet Army. However, as high-ranked athletes were virtually exempt from a regular two-year military service, he was allowed to join SKA Odessa for two years and continue his career as a footballer.

In 1990, he transferred to Lokomotiv Moscow and help the club achieve promotion to the top tier of Soviet football with 9 goals in 24 games in the second tier. In 1991, however, Shamrin made just five scoreless appearances in what would be the last season of the Soviet league, with his team finishing in the relegation zone.

From 1992 to 1993, Shamrin played in the second tier of Russian football, again representing FC Metallurg. From 1994 to 1995, he was a player of FC Druzhba in Maykop, Adygea. Since 1996, he played only amateur football.

== Personal life and death ==
Shamrin had a son, Sergey. On 16 January 2026, he was reported missing. The next day, his body was found on the street, with hypothermia likely having caused his death. He was weeks away from celebrating his 57th birthday. In his later years, he suffered from a severe neurological condition and had a disability status.

Shamrin was a baptized Orthodox Christian and a godfather to Ilya Tsymbalar's children.
