= Mikhail Nikitin =

Russian footballer

Personal information
- Full name: Mikhail Aleksandrovich Nikitin
- Date of birth: 26 November 1971 (age 54)
- Place of birth: Buturlinka, Russian SFSR
- Height: 1.78 m (5 ft 10 in)
- Position: Forward

Senior career*
Years	Team	Apps	(Gls)
1991–1993	FC Sokol Saratov	102	(31)
1994–1995	FC Lada Togliatti	32	(6)
1995	FC Sokol-PZhD Saratov	32	(7)
1996	FC Lada Togliatti	33	(2)
1997	FC Shinnik Yaroslavl	8	(0)
1997	FC Lada-Togliatti-VAZ Togliatti	21	(4)
1998	FC Gazovik-Gazprom Izhevsk	38	(10)
1999	FC Baltika Kaliningrad	27	(6)
2000–2002	FC Sokol Saratov	69	(14)
2002	FC Gazovik-Gazprom Izhevsk	11	(3)
2003	FC Sokol Saratov	22	(2)
2003	FC Iskra Engels	9	(1)
2004–2007	FC Gazovik-Gazprom Izhevsk	82	(25)
- * Club domestic league appearances and goals

Mikhail Aleksandrovich Nikitin (Russian: Михаил Александрович Никитин; born 26 November 1971) is a Russian former professional footballer.

He made his professional debut in the Soviet Second League in 1991 for FC Sokol Saratov.
