= Sergei Kovalyov (footballer, born 1972) =

Russian footballer and manager

Personal information
- Full name: Sergei Viktorovich Kovalyov
- Date of birth: 13 August 1972 (age 54)
- Place of birth: Voronezh, Russian SFSR
- Height: 1.70 m (5 ft 7 in)
- Position: Defender

Youth career
- FC Fakel Voronezh

Senior career*
Years	Team	Apps	(Gls)
1989	FC Fakel-MTsOP Voronezh		
1990	FC Fakel Voronezh	0	(0)
1990–1991	FC Dynamo Moscow	0	(0)
1991–1992	FC Dynamo-Gazovik Tyumen	35	(1)
1994	FC Irgiz Balakovo	6	(0)
1994	FC Spartak Anapa	17	(1)
1995–1999	FC Lokomotiv Liski	93	(2)
2000–2001	FC Gazovik Ostrogozhsk		

Managerial career
- 2008: FC Fakel-StroyArt Voronezh (assistant)
- * Club domestic league appearances and goals

Sergei Viktorovich Kovalyov (Russian: Сергей Викторович Ковалёв; born 13 August 1972 in Voronezh) is a Russian football manager and a former player.
