= Andrei Ivanov (footballer, born 1972) =

Russian footballer and coach

Personal information
- Full name: Andrei Vladimirovich Ivanov
- Date of birth: 4 January 1972 (age 54)
- Place of birth: Oryol, Russian SFSR
- Height: 1.80 m (5 ft 11 in)
- Position: Goalkeeper

Senior career*
Years	Team	Apps	(Gls)
1993–2006	FC Oryol	305	(6)
2007	FC Oryol (D4)		
2008–2012	FC Rusichi Oryol	9	(0)
2014–2015	FC Oryol	0	(0)

Managerial career
- 2012–2013: FC Oryol (assistant)
- 2015–2017: FC Oryol (GK coach)
- * Club domestic league appearances and goals

Andrei Vladimirovich Ivanov (Russian: Андрей Владимирович Иванов; born 4 January 1972) is a Russian professional football coach and a former player.

== Club career ==
He played 3 seasons in the Russian Football National League for FC Oryol.
