= Yevgeni Kasyanenko =

Russian footballer

Personal information
- Full name: Yevgeni Leonidovich Kasyanenko
- Date of birth: 10 March 1965 (age 61)
- Height: 1.76 m (5 ft 9 1/2 in)
- Position: Midfielder

Senior career*
Years	Team	Apps	(Gls)
1983–1984	FC Luch Vladivostok	30	(1)
1986–1987	FC Luch Vladivostok	12	(0)
1987	FC Voskhod Vladivostok		
1988–1990	FC Luch Vladivostok	89	(12)
1992–1993	FC Luch Vladivostok	27	(9)
1995–1996	FC Portovik Vladivostok		
1996	FC Yelimay Semipalatinsk	0	(0)
1996	FC Irtysh Pavlodar	4	(0)
1998	FC Avtomobilist Pokrovka		
- * Club domestic league appearances and goals

Yevgeni Leonidovich Kasyanenko (Russian: Касьяненко Евгений Леонидович; born 10 March 1965) is a former Russian football player.

== Honours ==
Irtysh Pavlodar

- Kazakhstan Premier League runner-up: 1996
