= Aleksei Chernov (footballer, born 1974) =

Russian footballer

Personal information
- Full name: Aleksei Aleksandrovich Chernov
- Date of birth: 25 March 1974 (age 52)
- Place of birth: Volgograd Oblast, Russian SFSR
- Height: 1.72 m (5 ft 7 1/2 in)
- Position: Forward

Senior career*
Years	Team	Apps	(Gls)
1991	FC Rus Volgograd	38	(11)
1992–1995	FC Zvezda Gorodishche	133	(56)
1996–1999	FC Lada-Simbirsk Dimitrovgrad	151	(77)
2000	FC Lada Togliatti	17	(5)
2000	FC Tom Tomsk	11	(3)
2001	FC Metallurg Lipetsk	20	(9)
- * Club domestic league appearances and goals

Aleksei Aleksandrovich Chernov (Russian: Алексей Александрович Чернов; born 25 March 1974) is a former Russian professional football player.

== Club career ==
He played 5 seasons in the Russian Football National League for FC Lada-Simbirsk Dimitrovgrad, FC Lada Togliatti and FC Tom Tomsk.

== Honours ==
- Russian First Division top scorer: 1997 (29 goals).
