= Tamazi Yenik =

Russian footballer and coach

Personal information
- Full name: Tamazi Vakhtangovich Yenik
- Date of birth: 15 January 1967 (age 59)
- Height: 1.78 m (5 ft 10 in)
- Positions: Defender; midfielder

Team information
- Current team: FC Gagra (manager)

Senior career*
Years	Team	Apps	(Gls)
1985–1986	FC Dinamo Sukhumi	24	(0)
1987–1989	FC Zarafshan Navoi	86	(12)
1990–1991	FC Dinamo Sukhumi	74	(6)
1992–1997	FC Druzhba Maykop	192	(70)
1997	FC Lada-Grad Dimitrovgrad	12	(1)
1998	FC Druzhba Maykop	15	(2)
1999	FC Lokomotiv Nizhny Novgorod	3	(0)
1999	FC Torpedo-Viktoriya Nizhny Novgorod	11	(0)
2000	FC Maykop		
2001	FC Nart Cherkessk (amateur)		
2002	FC Druzhba Maykop	20	(0)
2003	FC Spartak Anapa	8	(1)

Managerial career
- 2006: FC Spartak-UGP Anapa (assistant)
- 2011–: FC Gagra
- * Club domestic league appearances and goals

Tamazi Vakhtangovich Yenik (Russian: Тамази Вахтангович Еник; born 15 January 1967) is a Russian football coach and a former player. He manages FC Gagra.
