= FC Izhevsk =

- Full name: Football Club Izhevsk
- Founded: 1936
- Dissolved: 2005
- 2004: Russian Second Division, Zone Ural-Povolzhye, 19th

FC Izhevsk (Russian: ФК «Ижевск») was a Russian football team from Izhevsk. It played professionally from 1946 to 1949 and 1956 to 2004. It played at the second-highest level (Soviet First League and Russian First Division) in 1947–1949, 1956–1962, 1968–1969 and 1992–1993.

== Team name history ==
- 1936–1948: Zenit Izhevsk
- 1949–1955: Izhevsky Zavod Izhevsk
- 1956–1984: Zenit Izhevsk
- 1985–1987: Zenit Ustinov (Izhevsk was renamed briefly to Ustinov)
- 1988–1998: Zenit Izhevsk
- 1998–2003: Dynamo Izhevsk
- 2004: FC Izhevsk
