= Vladimir Belkov =

Russian footballer and coach (1941–2022)

Personal information
- Full name: Vladimir Ivanovich Belkov
- Date of birth: 26 December 1941
- Place of birth: Vichuga, Ivanovo Oblast, Russian SFSR, USSR
- Date of death: 9 February 2022 (aged 80)
- Place of death: Ivanovo, Russia
- Height: 1.74 m (5 ft 9 in)
- Positions: Midfielder; forward

Senior career*
| Years | Team | Apps | (Gls) |
| 1961–1969 | Tekstilshchik Ivanovo | 213 | (27) |
| 1969 | Kovrovets Kovrov | | |
| 1971–1972 | Melanzhist Ivanovo | | |

Managerial career
- 1974–1976: Tekstilshchik Ivanovo (assistant)
- 1979–1981: Volzhanin Kineshma
- 1983–1990: Tekstilshchik Ivanovo (academy)
- 1990–1998: Tekstilshchik Ivanovo
- 1999–2000: Spartak-Telekom Shuya (assistant)
- 2000: Spartak-Telekom Shuya
- 2000–2002: Spartak-Telekom Shuya (assistant)
- 2004: Tekstilshchik-Telekom Ivanovo (assistant)
- 2005–2006: Tekstilshchik-Telekom Ivanovo
- 2007–2008: Vichuga
- 2009: Tekstilshchik Ivanovo (consultant)
- 2010: Tekstilshchik Ivanovo (assistant)
- * Club domestic league appearances and goals

Vladimir Ivanovich Belkov (Russian: Владимир Иванович Белков; 26 December 1941 – 9 February 2022) was a Russian professional football coach and player.

Belkov played in the Soviet First League with Tekstilshchik Ivanovo. He died on 9 February 2022, at the age of 80.
