= Sergei Kovalyov (footballer, born 1965) =

Russian footballer

Personal information
- Full name: Sergei Igorevich Kovalyov
- Date of birth: 22 September 1965 (age 61)
- Place of birth: Krasnodar, Russian SFSR
- Height: 1.76 m (5 ft 9 1/2 in)
- Positions: Forward; midfielder

Senior career*
Years	Team	Apps	(Gls)
1986	FC Tsement Novorossiysk	31	(1)
1987	FC Kuban Krasnodar	29	(3)
1988	FC Neftyanik Fergana	13	(2)
1989	FC Rodina Petrovskaya		
1990	FC Aktyubinets	33	(6)
1991	FC Kuban Timashyovsk	20	(1)
1991–1994	FC KAMAZ Naberezhnye Chelny	79	(4)
1993	→ FC KAMAZ-d Naberezhnye Chelny (loan)	4	(2)
1995	FC Neftekhimik Nizhnekamsk	14	(1)
1995–1996	FC Dynamo Vologda	19	(2)
1996–2002	FC GNS-Spartak Krasnodar		
2008	FC GNS-Spartak Krasnodar		
- * Club domestic league appearances and goals

Sergei Igorevich Kovalyov (Russian: Сергей Игоревич Ковалёв; born 22 September 1965 in Krasnodar) is a former Russian football player.
