= Narzan Kislovodsk =

STsOP Kislovodsk
- Full name: Football Club STsOP Kislovodsk
- Founded: 1961; 64 years ago
- Dissolved: 2002; 23 years ago
- 2001: Amateur Football League, Zone South, 9th

Narzan Kislovodsk (Russian: Нарзан Кисловодск) was a Russian football team from Kislovodsk. It was founded in 1961 and played professionally from 1961 to 1970 and from 1991 to 1997. In 2001 it played in the Amateur Football League. It played on the second highest level (Soviet First League and Russian First Division) in 1961, 1962, 1992 and 1993. It was called Trudovye Rezervy Kislovodsk (1961–1965), Spartak Kislovodsk (1966–1967), Narzan Kislovodsk (1968–1991), Asmaral Kislovodsk (1991–1993), Olimp Kislovodsk (1994–2000), and after 2011 again Narzan Kislovodsk.
