= Viktor Tishchenko =

Russian footballer and coach

Personal information
- Full name: Viktor Grigoryevich Tishchenko
- Date of birth: February 22, 1949 (age 77)
- Position: Midfielder

Team information
- Current team: FC Lokomotiv Moscow (director of sports)

Senior career*
Years	Team	Apps	(Gls)
1971	FC Energiya Cheboksary	19	(0)

Managerial career
- 1988: FC Neftyanik Fergana (assistant)
- 1989: FC Zarafshan Navoi
- 1989–1990: FC Aktyubinets Aktyubinsk
- 1991–1992: FC Torpedo Armavir
- 1993: FC Kolos Krasnodar
- 1994: FC Lada Togliatti
- 1996–1997: FC Lada Togliatti
- 2004: FC Chernomorets Novorossiysk (caretaker)
- 2005–2006: FC Sochi-04
- 2009: FC Lokomotiv Moscow (assistant)
- 2010–: FC Lokomotiv Moscow (director of sports)
- * Club domestic league appearances and goals

Viktor Grigoryevich Tishchenko (Russian: Виктор Григорьевич Тищенко; born February 22, 1949) is a Russian professional football coach and a former player. Currently, he is a director of sports with FC Lokomotiv Moscow.
