= Igor Tikhonov =

Russian footballer and coach

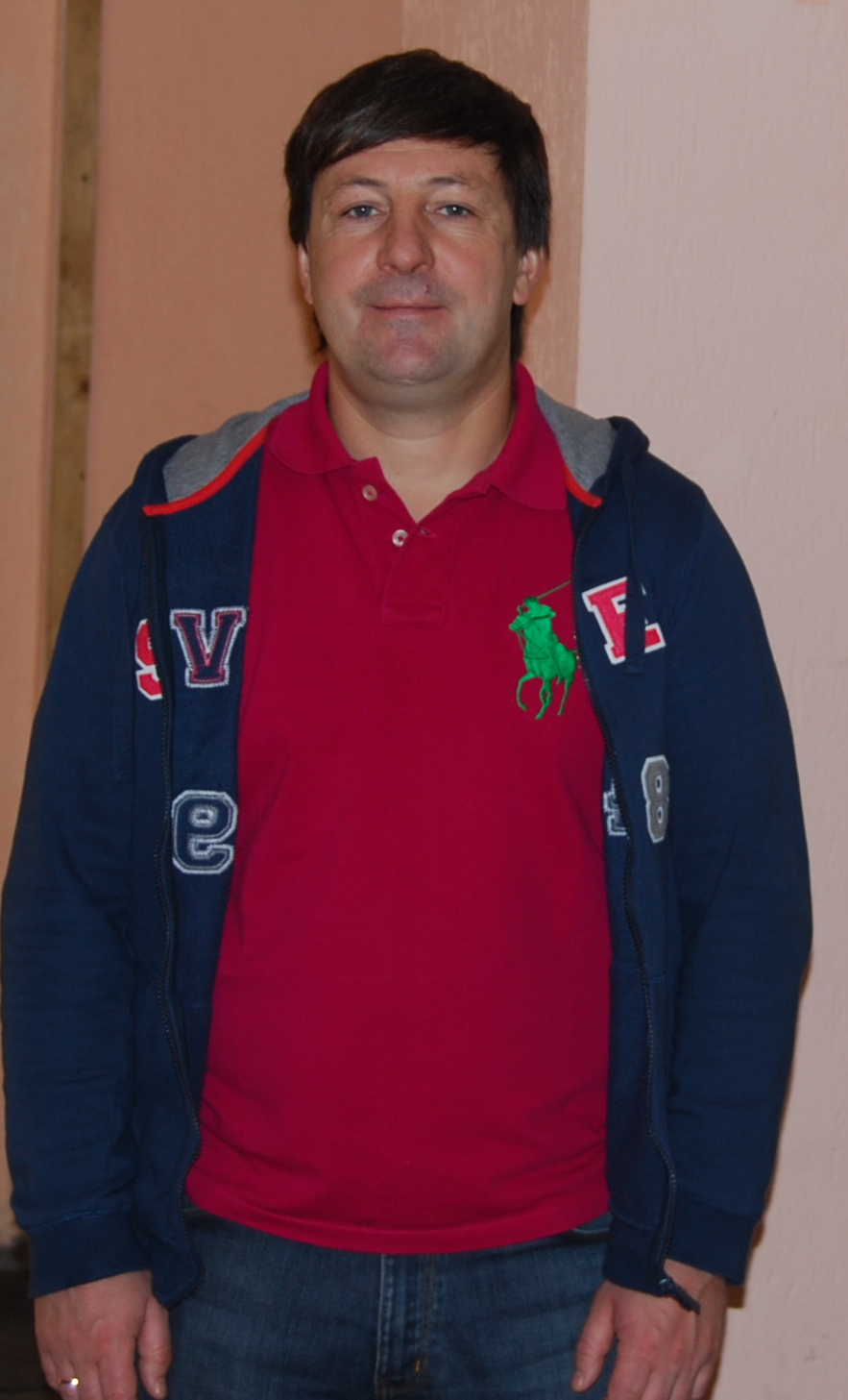

Personal information
- Full name: Igor Nikolayevich Tikhonov
- Date of birth: 13 December 1969 (age 56)
- Place of birth: Ivanovo, Russian SFSR
- Height: 1.78 m (5 ft 10 in)
- Position: Forward

Team information
- Current team: FC Tekstilshchik Ivanovo (assistant manager)

Youth career
- FC Tekstilshchik Ivanovo

Senior career*
Years	Team	Apps	(Gls)
1987–1996	FC Tekstilshchik Ivanovo	230	(99)
1996–1997	FC KAMAZ-Chally Naberezhnye Chelny	22	(0)
1997–1998	FC Rubin Kazan	33	(10)
1999	FC Avtomobilist Noginsk	38	(15)
2000–2001	FC Torpedo Vladimir	36	(9)
2003–2004	FC Tekstilshchik Ivanovo	39	(1)
2009	FC Tekstilshchik Ivanovo	4	(1)

Managerial career
- 2008: FC Tekstilshchik Ivanovo (video operator)
- 2008–2009: FC Tekstilshchik Ivanovo (assistant)
- 2010: FC Tekstilshchik Ivanovo (director)
- 2010–: FC Tekstilshchik Ivanovo (assistant)
- 2015: FC Tekstilshchik Ivanovo (caretaker)
- 2016: FC Tekstilshchik Ivanovo (caretaker)
- * Club domestic league appearances and goals

Igor Nikolayevich Tikhonov (Russian: Игорь Николаевич Тихонов; born 13 December 1969) is a Russian professional football coach and a former player. Currently, he is the lead assistant manager for FC Tekstilshchik Ivanovo.

== Club career ==
He made his debut in the Russian Premier League in 1996 for FC KAMAZ-Chally Naberezhnye Chelny.

== Honours ==
- Russian Second Division Zone West top scorer: 1994 (29 goals).
