= Marat Mulashev =

Russian footballer and coach

Personal information
- Full name: Marat Lenzovich Mulashev
- Date of birth: 7 January 1968 (age 58)
- Place of birth: Omsk, Russian SFSR
- Height: 1.82 m (5 ft 11 1/2 in)
- Position: Striker

Youth career
- Neftyanik Omsk

Senior career*
Years	Team	Apps	(Gls)
1989–1991	FC Irtysh Omsk	98	(28)
1992	Tavriya Simferopol	2	(0)
1992	FC Rubin-TAN Kazan	34	(18)
1993	FC Luch Vladivostok	32	(4)
1994	FC Chernomorets Novorossiysk	6	(0)
1995–2002	FC Irtysh Omsk	226	(88)

Managerial career
- 2005–2006: FC Irtysh-1946 Omsk (assistant)
- * Club domestic league appearances and goals

Marat Lenzovich Mulashev (Russian: Марат Лензович Мулашев; born 7 January 1968) is a Russian professional football coach and a former player.

== Honours ==
- Russian Second Division Zone East top scorer: 1996 (22 goals).
