= Sergei Vasyutin =

Russian professional football coach (born 1957)

Personal information
- Full name: Sergei Nikolayevich Vasyutin
- Date of birth: 2 July 1957 (age 69)

Managerial career
- Years: Team
- 1990–1997: Zarya Leninsk-Kuznetsky
- 1998–1999: Kuzbass Kemerovo
- 2000: Irtysh Omsk
- 2001: Chkalovets-Olimpik Novosibirsk
- 2005–2007: Zarya Leninsk-Kuznetsky

Sergei Nikolayevich Vasyutin (Russian: Серге́й Николаевич Васютин; born 2 July 1957) is a Russian professional football coach.

Vasyutin managed FC Zarya Leninsk-Kuznetsky in the Russian First League.
