= Vladimir Bychek =

Russian football player (1952–2015)

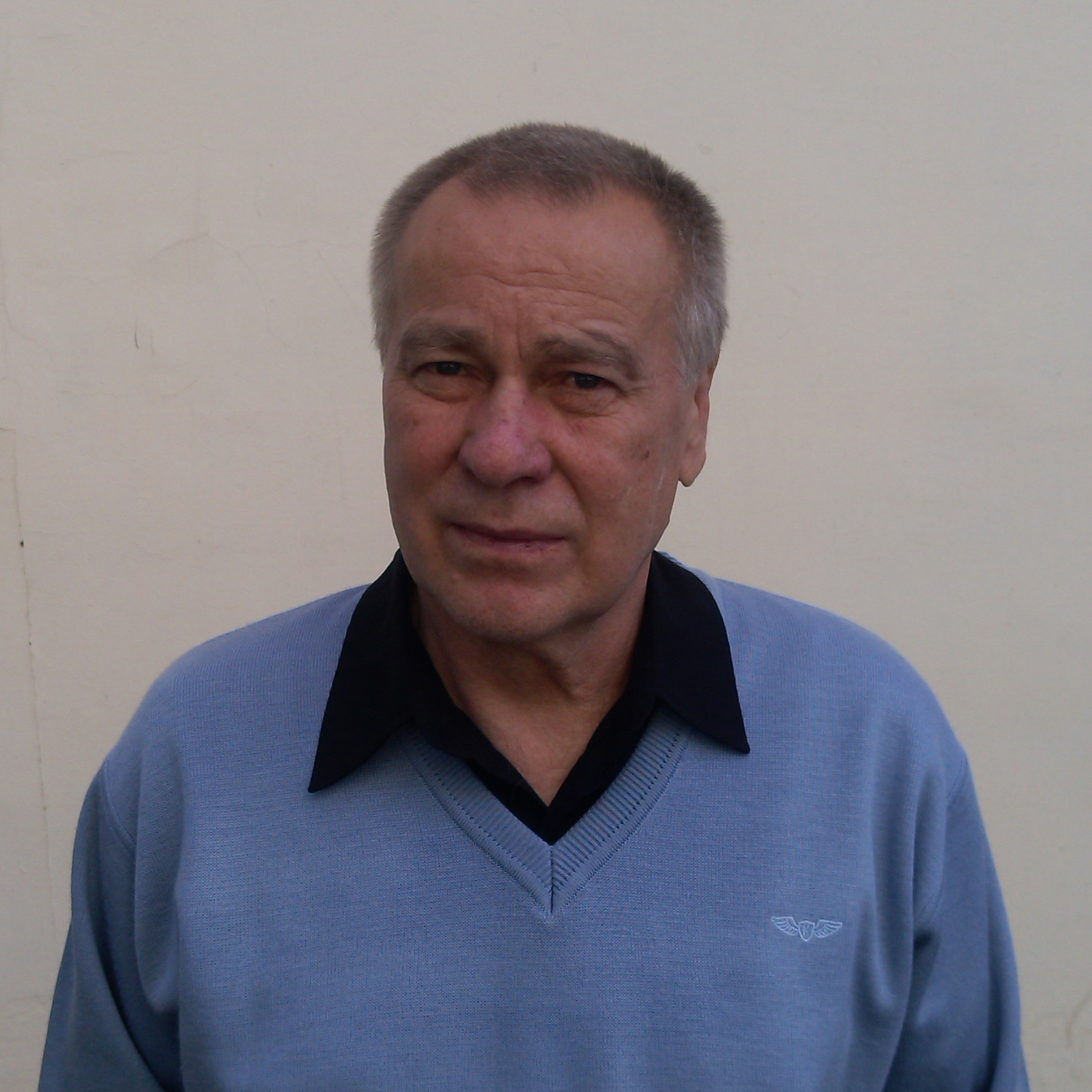

Personal information
- Full name: Vladimir Ilyich Bychek
- Date of birth: 21 October 1952
- Place of birth: Khabarovsk, Soviet Union
- Date of death: 13 December 2015 (aged 63)
- Place of death: Khabarovsk, Russia
- Height: 1.78 m (5 ft 10 in)
- Position: Defender

Senior career*
Years	Team	Apps	(Gls)
1974–1977	SKA Khabarovsk	99	(4)
1977	CSKA Moscow	22	(0)
1978–1987	SKA Khabarovsk	370	(3)
1993	SKA Khabarovsk	15	(0)

Managerial career
- 1988–1994: SKA Khabarovsk
- * Club domestic league appearances and goals

Vladimir Ilyich Bychek (Russian: Владимир Ильич Бычек; 21 October 1952 – 13 December 2015) was a Russian professional football player and coach.

== Career ==
Bychek began playing professional football with local side SKA Khabarovsk in 1973. He played a total of 14 seasons for the club in the Soviet First League and Soviet Second League, making 479 appearances for the club (the second most in all-time). In 1980, Bychek was part of the SKA squad that achieved a best-ever sixth-place finish in the Soviet First League (the squad was rewarded with a tour of Mozambique).

In 1976, Bychek was named to the list of the best 22 players in the Soviet First and Second Leagues. As a result, he was able to join Soviet Top League club CSKA Moscow where he made 22 appearances in the 1977 season.

After he retired from playing, Bychek became a football coach. He led his former club, SKA from 1988 to 1994, even playing 15 Soviet First League matches during the 1993 season as the club struggled to pay its players.
