= Mikhail Potylchak =

Russian footballer

Personal information
- Full name: Mikhail Aleksandrovich Potylchak
- Date of birth: 5 October 1972
- Place of birth: Leningrad, Russian SFSR
- Date of death: 6 October 2014 (aged 42)
- Place of death: Volgograd, Russia
- Height: 1.84 m (6 ft 1/2 in)
- Position: Striker

Senior career*
Years	Team	Apps	(Gls)
1991–1995	FC Torpedo Volzhsky	160	(49)
1996	FC Rotor Volgograd	3	(0)
1996	FC Torpedo Volzhsky	20	(13)
1997–1998	FC Tyumen	39	(3)
1998	FC Lada-Togliatti-VAZ Togliatti	18	(2)
- * Club domestic league appearances and goals

Mikhail Aleksandrovich Potylchak (Russian: Михаил Александрович Потыльчак; 5 October 1972 – 6 October 2014) was a Russian professional footballer.

== Club career ==
He made his professional debut in the Soviet Second League in 1991 for FC Torpedo Volzhsky. He played 1 game in the UEFA Intertoto Cup 1996 for FC Rotor Volgograd.

== Death ==
He committed suicide by hanging in 2014.

== Honours ==
- Russian Premier League bronze: 1996.
