= Aleksandr Kishinevsky =

Russian footballer and coach (born 1954)

Personal information
- Full name: Aleksandr Anatolyevich Kishinevsky
- Date of birth: 7 May 1954 (age 72)
- Place of birth: Baku, Soviet Union
- Height: 1.66 m (5 ft 5 in)
- Positions: Forward; midfielder

Team information
- Current team: Yenisey-2 Krasnoyarsk (assistant manager)

Senior career*
Years	Team	Apps	(Gls)
1972–1983	Avtomobilist Krasnoyarsk		
1984–1986	Kuzbass Kemerovo	114	(7)
1987	SKA Rostov-on-Don	34	(0)
1988–1989	Avtomobilist Krasnoyarsk	61	(11)

Managerial career
- 1991–1996: Metallurg Krasnoyarsk
- 1997: Gazovik-Gazprom Izhevsk (assistant)
- 1997: Gazovik-Gazprom Izhevsk
- 1998: Viktoriya Nazarovo
- 1999–2000: Reformatsiya Abakan
- 2000–2003: Dynamo-Mashinostroitel Kirov
- 2004–2006: Metallurg Krasnoyarsk
- 2007: Metallurg Krasnoyarsk (assistant)
- 2007: Metallurg Krasnoyarsk
- 2009–2010: Metallurg-Kuzbass Novokuznetsk
- 2011–2016: Restavratsiya Krasnoyarsk
- 2016–2020: Rassvet Krasnoyarsk
- 2020–2026: Yenisey-2 Krasnoyarsk
- 2026–: Yenisey-2 Krasnoyarsk (assistant)
- * Club domestic league appearances and goals

Aleksandr Anatolyevich Kishinevsky (Russian: Александр Анатольевич Кишиневский; born 7 May 1954) is a Russian professional football coach and a former player. He is the assistant manager of Yenisey-2 Krasnoyarsk.

== Club career ==
As a player, he made his debut in the Soviet Second League in 1972 for Avtomobilist Krasnoyarsk.

Kishinevsky played in the Soviet First League with Kuzbass Kemerovo and SKA Rostov-on-Don.

== Honours ==
- Russian Second Division Zone East best manager: 2005.
