= Sergey Muratov (footballer) =

Russian footballer and coach (1948–2008)

Personal information
- Full name: Sergey Alekseyevich Muratov
- Date of birth: 23 September 1948
- Place of birth: Lev Tolstoy, Russian SFSR, USSR
- Date of death: 27 August 2008 (aged 59)
- Position: Defender

Senior career*
Years	Team	Apps	(Gls)
1969–1972	Start Angarsk		
1972–1973	SKA Chita		
1974–1975	Lokomotiv Chita		
1976–1977	Angara Angarsk		

Managerial career
- 1979–1982: Angara Angarsk (assistant)
- 1984–1989: Zvezda Irkutsk
- 1992–2000: Zvezda Irkutsk
- 1998–2008: Zvezda Irkutsk (president)
- 2001–2003: Lokomotiv Chita
- 2003: Sibiryak Bratsk
- 2004–2006: Chita
- 2008: Zvezda Irkutsk (assistant)
- * Club domestic league appearances and goals

Sergey Alekseyevich Muratov (Russian: Серге́й Алексе́евич Мура́тов; 24 September 1948 — 27 August 2008) was a professional association football coach and a player from Russia.
