= Vladimir Yevsyukov =

Russian footballer and coach

Personal information
- Full name: Vladimir Nikolayevich Yevsyukov
- Date of birth: 30 November 1953 (age 72)
- Place of birth: Orsk, Russian SFSR
- Height: 1.69 m (5 ft 6 1/2 in)
- Positions: Striker; midfielder

Youth career
- DYuSSh Orsk

Senior career*
Years	Team	Apps	(Gls)
1972	FC Lokomotiv Orenburg		
1975–1979	FC Torpedo Togliatti	151	(23)
1979–1981	FC Krylia Sovetov Kuybyshev	49	(0)
1981	FC Rubin Togliatti		
1984–1985	FC Torpedo Togliatti	31	(8)
1985	FC Krylia Sovetov Kuybyshev	18	(2)
1986–1988	FC Torpedo Togliatti	68	(12)

Managerial career
- 1992–1993: FC Lada Togliatti
- 1994: FC Lada Togliatti (assistant)
- 1995–1999: FC Lada-Simbirsk Dimitrovgrad
- 2001: FC Metallurg Lipetsk
- 2004–2006: FC Lada Togliatti
- 2007–2008: FC Lada Togliatti (assistant)
- 2009: FC Gornyak Uchaly
- 2011: FC Volga Ulyanovsk
- 2016: FC Lada-Togliatti
- * Club domestic league appearances and goals

Vladimir Nikolayevich Yevsyukov (Russian: Владимир Николаевич Евсюков; born 30 November 1953) is a Russian professional football coach and a former player.

== Biography ==
Yevsyukov was born 30 November, 1953 in Orsk. He has been involved in soccer since childhood, first at the amateur level, then he joined the junior team of FC Metallurg Orsk. At the age of 15, he was invited to join FC Lokomotiv Orenburg. He graduated from an oil technical school, after which he entered the Orenburg branch of the Siberian Academy of Physical Culture, graduating in 1975.

=== Playing career ===
Yevsyukov served in the army in Army Sports Club in Samara (Kuibyshev at the time). Received offers from FC Krylia Sovetov and FC Torpedo Togliatti, decided in favor of the Togliatti team thanks to coach Boris Kazakov. He played for the team for 4 seasons, 131 games and scored 22 goals.

In 1979 he moved to Krylia Sovetov, where he spent 2 years. Played for the team again in 1985. In 1984-1985 and 1986-1988 he played for Torpedo.

At the age of 34 he finished his career as a player.

On December 30, 1989 he was awarded the title of Master of Sports of the USSR.

=== Coaching career ===
Graduated with honors from the Higher School of Coaches. He interned at FC Spartak Moscow.

In 1992, he returned to Togliatti, where he first coached FC Lada-2, four months later he was entrusted with the main team. In 1993, he took the team to the Russian Premier League. In 2005 brought the team to the Russian First League.

He also coached FC Lada Dimitrovgrad (1995-1999), FC Metallurg Lipetsk (2000-2001), FC Gornyak Uchaly (2009), FC Volga Ulyanovsk (2010-2011). His last job was with his native FC Lada in Togliatti in 2016.
