= Sergei Savchenkov =

Russian footballer (born 1955)

Personal information
- Full name: Sergei Viktorovich Savchenkov
- Date of birth: 1 January 1955 (age 71)
- Place of birth: Lyudinovo, Russian SFSR
- Height: 1.89 m (6 ft 2 1/2 in)
- Position: Defender

Youth career
- Avangard Lyudinovo

Senior career*
| Years | Team | Apps | (Gls) |
| 1972–1974 | Avangard Lyudinovo | | |
| 1975–1977 | Salyut Belgorod | 87 | (0) |
| 1977 | Kuzbass Kemerovo | 9 | (0) |
| 1978–1979 | Dynamo Leningrad | 73 | (2) |
| 1980 | Zenit Leningrad | 0 | (0) |
| 1980–1983 | Fakel Voronezh | 135 | (4) |
| 1983 | Spartak Moscow | 3 | (0) |
| 1984–1987 | Fakel Voronezh | 146 | (9) |
| 1988 | Dynamo Leningrad | 28 | (0) |

Managerial career
- 1988: Dynamo Leningrad (assistant)
- 1988–1990: Fakel Voronezh (assistant)
- 1990–1991: Fakel Voronezh
- 1992–1993: Tekstilshchik Kamyshin (assistant)
- 1993–1998: Fakel Voronezh
- 1999–2000: Metallurg Lipetsk
- 2001: Metallurg Krasnoyarsk
- 2001: Baltika Kaliningrad
- 2002: Salyut-Energia Belgorod
- 2002–2003: Fakel-Voronezh Voronezh
- 2004: Salyut-Energia Belgorod
- 2004–2005: Fakel Voronezh (director of sports)
- 2006: Atlantas
- 2007: Salyut-Energia Belgorod
- 2008: Dynamo-Voronezh Voronezh
- 2009: Gubkin
- 2010–2012: Fakel Voronezh (director of sports)
- 2012: Fakel Voronezh
- 2013–2017: Atlantas (assistant)
- 2017: Atlantas (caretaker)
- * Club domestic league appearances and goals

Sergei Viktorovich Savchenkov (Russian: Серге́й Викторович Савченков; born 1 January 1955) is a Russian professional football coach and a former player.

== Club career ==
As a player, he made his debut in the Soviet First League in 1977 for FC Kuzbass Kemerovo.

== Personal life ==
His son Anton Savchenkov is a professional footballer.

== Honours ==
- Soviet Top League runner-up: 1983.
