= Vladimir Dergach =

Russian football manager (born 1957)

Personal information
- Full name: Vladimir Leonidovich Dergach
- Date of birth: 1 January 1957 (age 69)
- Position: Defender

Team information
- Current team: Rotor Volgograd (U19 manager)

Senior career*
Years	Team	Apps	(Gls)
1974–1976	Avtomobilist Termez		
1978	Avtomobilist Termez		
1979–1981	Avtomobilist Krasnoyarsk		
1982	Khimik Dzerzhinsk	26	(0)
1986	Lokomotiv Mineralnye Vody	30	(4)

Managerial career
- 1984: Khimik Dzerzhinsk (assistant)
- 1986: Lokomotiv Mineralnye Vody (assistant)
- 1990: Znamya Arzamas
- 1992–1994: Torpedo Arzamas
- 1995–1996: Torpedo Volzhsky
- 1997: Energetik Uren (VP)
- 1997–1998: Lada-Tolyatti-VAZ Tolyatti
- 1999: Baltika Kaliningrad
- 2000: Uralan Elista
- 2000: Metallurg Lipetsk
- 2000–2002: Zhenis
- 2003: Esil Kokshetau
- 2004: Chernomorets Novorossiysk (assistant)
- 2004: Lisma-Mordovia Saransk
- 2006: Metallurg Krasnoyarsk (assistant)
- 2007: Zenit Penza (assistant)
- 2008: Zenit Penza
- 2010–2011: Zenit Penza
- 2014–2015: Torpedo Armavir (assistant)
- 2016–2017: Afips Afipsk (assistant)
- 2017–2018: Rotor-2 Volgograd (assistant)
- 2018: Ekslyuziv Volzhsky
- 2019–2022: Rotor Volgograd (academy)
- 2022: Rotor Volgograd (U17)
- 2024–: Rotor Volgograd (U19)
- * Club domestic league appearances and goals

Vladimir Leonidovich Dergach (Russian: Владимир Леонидович Дергач; born 1 January 1957) is a Russian professional football coach and a former player who manages the Under-19 squad of Rotor Volgograd.
