= Valeri Nenenko =

Russian footballer and manager

Personal information
- Full name: Valeri Georgiyevich Nenenko
- Date of birth: 30 March 1950 (age 76)
- Place of birth: Voronezh, Russian SFSR
- Height: 1.76 m (5 ft 9 1/2 in)
- Position: Forward

Senior career*
Years	Team	Apps	(Gls)
1969–1970	Trud Voronezh	34	(3)
1970–1973	Iskra Smolensk		
1973	Metallurg Zhdanov	11	(0)
1973–1974	Metallurg Lipetsk		
1974–1976	Trud Voronezh	53	(11)

Managerial career
- 1989: Fakel Voronezh (assistant)
- 1990–1991: Buran Voronezh
- 1992: Fakel Voronezh (assistant)
- 1992–1993: Fakel Voronezh
- 1993–1994: Fakel Voronezh (assistant)
- 1995: Arsenal Tula
- 1997–1998: Kristall Smolensk
- 1999–2001: Fakel Voronezh
- 2002: Chernomorets Novorossiysk
- 2002–2003: Salyut-Energia Belgorod
- 2004–2005: Dynamo Voronezh
- 2005: Rotor-2 Volgograd
- 2006–2007: Fakel Voronezh
- 2008: Dynamo-Voronezh Voronezh (sporting director)
- 2012: Astrakhan
- * Club domestic league appearances and goals

Valeri Georgiyevich Nenenko (Russian: Валерий Георгиевич Нененко; born 30 March 1950) is a Russian professional football coach and a former player.
