= Aleksandr Ignatenko =

Russian football coach (born 1951)

Personal information
- Full name: Aleksandr Viktorovich Ignatenko
- Date of birth: 12 December 1951 (age 74)
- Place of birth: Voroshilovgrad, Ukrainian SSR
- Height: 1.77 m (5 ft 9 1/2 in)
- Positions: Forward; midfielder

Youth career
- Zorya Voroshylovhrad

Senior career*
Years	Team	Apps	(Gls)
1969–1974	Zorya Voroshylovhrad	1	(0)
1974	Sever Murmansk		(2)
1974–1975	SK Chernihiv		(11)
1975	CSKA Moscow	1	(0)
1976–1982	Zorya Voroshylovhrad	151	(8)
1982–1985	Metallurg Lipetsk	110	(26)

Managerial career
- 1989: Metallurg Lipetsk (assistant)
- 1990–1993: Metallurg Lipetsk
- 1997: Tyumen (assistant)
- 1997–1998: Tyumen
- 1999: Kristall Smolensk
- 2000: Spartak Shchyolkovo
- 2002: Shatura
- 2003: Torpedo-Metallurg Moscow (assistant)
- 2003: Torpedo-Metallurg Moscow
- 2004–2006: Sodovik Sterlitamak
- 2007: Baltika Kaliningrad
- 2008: Moscow (assistant)
- 2009: Volgar-Gazprom Astrakhan
- 2010–2012: Avangard Kursk
- * Club domestic league appearances and goals

Aleksandr Viktorovich Ignatenko (Russian: Александр Викторович Игнатенко; born 12 December 1951) is a Ukrainian-born Russian professional football coach and a former player.

As a player, he made his debut in the Soviet Top League in 1970 for Zarya Voroshilovgrad.

== Honours ==
- Soviet Top League champion: 1972.
- Russian Second Division Zone Ural/Povolzhye best manager: 2004, 2005.
