= FC Zvezda Perm =

Russian football team

- Full name: Football Club Zvezda Perm
- Founded: 1932
- Dissolved: 2022
- Ground: Zvezda Stadium
- Capacity: 17,000
- 2021–22: FNL 2, Group 4, 5th
- Website: https://fczp.ru/

FC Zvezda Perm (Russian: ФК "Звезда" Пермь) was a Russian football team from Perm, established in 1932 and dissolved in 2022.

== History ==
It played professionally from 1945 to 1949 and 1953 to 1995, and was established first in 1932.

It played on the second-highest level (Soviet First League and Russian First Division) in 1945–1949, 1953–1962, 1966–1969, 1972–1977, 1979, 1988 and 1992–1994, with the best result being 2nd place in 1960 and 3rd place in 1947, 1958 and 1992. It was called Krylia Sovetov Molotov until 1957, Perm was called Molotov during the period.

After the team was dissolved in 1997, Perm was represented professionally by FC Amkar Perm.

It was reestablished by the Government of Perm Oblast in June 2018 and since 2018–19 season the club was participating in the third-tier Russian Professional Football League. The club was not licensed for the 2022–23 season.

== See also ==
- Zvezda-2005 Perm
