= Aleksandr Kovalyov (football manager) =

Russian professional football coach (born 1950)

Personal information
- Full name: Aleksandr Petrovich Kovalyov
- Date of birth: 12 October 1950 (age 76)
- Place of birth: Domna, Russian SFSR, Soviet Union

Managerial career
- Years: Team
- 1978–1983: Lokomotiv Chita
- 1984–1985: Lokomotiv Chita (assistant)
- 1986–2004: Lokomotiv Chita
- 1996–1999: Lokomotiv Chita (president)
- 2004–2005: Lokomotiv Chita (director of sports)
- 2006–2007: Zvezda Irkutsk (president)
- 2020–2021: Zenit Irkutsk (director of sports)

Aleksandr Petrovich Kovalyov (Russian: Александр Петрович Ковалёв; born 12 October 1950) is a Russian professional football coach.

== Career ==
Kovalyov managed Russian First League side Lokomotiv Chita. He was president of First Division side Zvezda Irkutsk from 2006 to 2008.
