= FC Portovik-Energiya Kholmsk =

Russian football club

- Full name: Football Club Portovik-Energiya Kholmsk
- Founded: 1969
- League: Amateur Football League; Zone Far East
- 2009: 2nd

FC Portovik-Energiya Kholmsk (Russian: ФК «Портовик‑Энергия» Холмск) is a Russian football team from Kholmsk. It played professionally from 1969 to 1975 and from 1989 to 1995, including two seasons (1992–1993) in the second-highest Russian First Division.

== Team name and location history ==
- 1969–1992 FC Sakhalin Yuzhno-Sakhalinsk (in 2004 another club also called FC Sakhalin Yuzhno-Sakhalinsk was established, as of 2007 it plays in the Russian Second Division)
- 1993–1998 FC Sakhalin Kholmsk
- 1999–2006 FC Portovik Kholmsk
- 2007–present FC Portovik-Energiya Kholmsk
