= Aleksandr Ivchenko =

Russian professional football coach (born 1952)

Personal information
- Full name: Aleksandr Vladimirovich Ivchenko
- Date of birth: 6 January 1952 (age 74)

Managerial career
- Years: Team
- 1979–1984: Irtysh Omsk (assistant)
- 1985–1986: Irtysh Omsk (director)
- 1987–1990: Irtysh Omsk
- 1992: Rubin-TAN Kazan
- 1992–1993: Luch Vladivostok
- 1993–1995: Sur
- 1995–1998: Irtysh Omsk
- 1998: Sur
- 1999–2001: Gazovik-Gazprom Izhevsk
- 2001–2002: Irtysh Omsk
- 2003–2004: Metallurg-Kuzbass Novokuznetsk
- 2006: Lada-Tolyatti (director of sports)
- 2006: Lada-Tolyatti
- 2008–2010: Metallurg-Yenisey Krasnoyarsk
- 2011–2013: Zenit-Izhevsk
- 2015–2017: Tyumen

Aleksandr Vladimirovich Ivchenko (Russian: Александр Владимирович Ивченко; born 6 January 1952) is a Russian professional football coach.

== Honours ==
- Russian Second Division, Zone East best manager: 2009.
