= Oleg Dudarin =

Russian footballer and coach

Personal information
- Full name: Oleg Ivanovich Dudarin
- Date of birth: 7 August 1945 (age 81)
- Position: Midfielder

Senior career*
Years	Team	Apps	(Gls)
1964	Energiya Volzhsky		
1968–1969	Energiya Volzhsky		
1970	Dynamo Stavropol	37	(1)

Managerial career
- 1976–1978: Trud Volzhsky (assistant)
- 1988: Torpedo Volzhsky (director)
- 1989–1991: Torpedo Volzhsky
- 1995: Torpedo Volzhsky
- 1997–1998: Torpedo Volzhsky
- 1999: Torpedo Volzhsky
- 2002: Torpedo Volzhsky (president)
- 2004–2010: Energiya Volzhsky (technical director)
- * Club domestic league appearances and goals

Oleg Ivanovich Dudarin (Russian: Олег Иванович Дударин; born 7 August 1945) is a Russian professional football coach and a former player.
