= FC Buryatia Ulan-Ude =

Russian football club

Buryatia Ulan-Ude
- Full name: Football Club Buryatia Ulan-Ude
- Founded: 1958 (as Lokomotiv Ulan-Ude)
- Ground: Republic of Buryatia Central Stadium
- Capacity: 10,000
- League: Amateur Football League Zone Siberia

FC Buryatia Ulan-Ude (Russian: ФК «Селенга» Улан‑Удэ) is a Russian football team from Ulan-Ude. It played professionally from 1958 to 2003. It played on the second-highest level (Soviet First League and Russian First Division) in 1958–1962, 1968–1969 and 1992–1993.

== Name history ==
- 1958–1960: Lokomotiv Ulan-Ude
- 1961–1963: Baikal Ulan-Ude
- 1964–1965: Armeyets Ulan-Ude
- 1966–1977: Selenga Ulan-Ude
- 1978–1983: Lokomotiv Ulan-Ude
- 1984–1993: Selenga Ulan-Ude
- 1994: Kristall Neryungri
- 1995–2003: Selenga Ulan-Ude
- 2004–2011: Kommunalnik Ulan-Ude
- 2011–2012: FC Buryatia Ulan-Ude
- 2012–2016: Selenga Ulan-Ude
- 2017–present: FC Buryatia Ulan-Ude
