= FC APK Morozovsk =

- Full name: Football Club APK Morozovsk
- Founded: 1969
- Dissolved: 1998
- 1997: Amateur Football League, Zone South, 4th

FC APK Morozovsk (Russian: ФК АПК Морозовск) was a Russian football team from Morozovsk. It played professionally from 1988 to 1996. It played on the second highest level, Russian First Division, in 1992 and 1993. It was called Luch Azov (1988–1989) and APK Azov (1990–1993).

As FC Luch Azov, they were Rostov Oblast champions six times (1969, 1981, 1983–86).

Some team alumni had international caps – Aleksei Gerasimenko and Yuri Kovtun.
