= FC Spartak Ryazan =

- Full name: Football Club Spartak Ryazan
- Founded: 1937
- Dissolved: 2000
- Ground: CSK Stadium, Ryazan
- Capacity: 25,000
- League: Russian Second Division, Zone Center
- 1999: 10th

FC Spartak Ryazan (Russian: ФК «Спартак» Рязань) was a Russian football team from Ryazan. It played professionally in 1949 and from 1959 to 1999. It played on the second-highest level (Soviet First League and Russian First Division) in 1949, 1959–1962, 1968 and 1992–1993. The best position they achieved was 2nd place in 1992.

The team was dissolved after the 1999 season, and their spot in the Russian Second Division was taken over by FC Ryazan, that club renamed itself to FC Spartak Ryazan for a part of the 2000 season only.

== Team name history ==
- 1937 – FC Spartak Ryazan
- 1938 – Ryazan City Team
- 1939–1958 – FC Spartak Ryazan
- 1959–1960 – FC Trud Ryazan
- 1961–1967 – FC Spartak Ryazan
- 1968 – FC Zvezda Ryazan
- 1969–1986 – FC Spartak Ryazan
- 1987 – FC Sapphire Ryazan
- 1988–1994 – FC Torpedo Ryazan
- 1995–1999 – FC Spartak Ryazan
