= Russian First League =

- Founded: 1992; 34 years ago
- Country: Russia
- Confederation: UEFA
- Number of clubs: 18
- Level on pyramid: 2
- Promotion to: Premier League
- Relegation to: Second League
- Domestic cup: Russian Cup
- Current champions: Rodina Moscow (1st title) (2025–26)
- Most championships: Chernomorets; Tyumen; Luch-Energiya; Shinnik; Anzhi; Mordovia; Orenburg; Krylia Sovetov; Rubin; Khimki; Baltika (2 titles)
- Website: fnl.pro/melbet
- Current: 2026–27 Russian First League

The Russian First League (Russian: Первая лига, Pervaya liga), formerly called Russian First Division (Russian: Первый дивизион) and Russian Football National League (FNL) (Russian: Первенство Футбольной Национальной Лиги, Pervenstvo Futbol'noy Natsional'noy Ligi) is the second level of the Russian football league system.

The Russian Professional Football League (PFL) used to run the division. Since 2011, it has been managed by the Football National League.

The league consists of 18 clubs. After each season the two top clubs are promoted to the Premier League, and the bottom three clubs are relegated to the Second League. Third and fourth team play in home-and-away promotion play-offs against the 13th and 14th Premier League teams. Should one or more clubs not possess the required licence to participate for the upcoming season, the teams previously relegated are kept in the league instead, in the order of last season's standings.

== History ==
Due to the dissolution of the Soviet Union, all Russian clubs of the former Soviet Top League and Soviet First League unified into the Russian Top Division, which meant that the new second tier of Russian football would remain regionalized.

On 10 June 2022, the number of teams in the league was reduced from 20 to 18 for the 2022–23 season. On the same day, the league requested Russian Football Union to rename the league to its historical name of Russian First League. RFU officially approved the name change on 23 June 2022. On the same date the league announced that the league's title sponsor would be a bookmaker Melbet.

== Current clubs ==
Location of teams in 2025–26 First League.

The following teams are competing in the 2024–25 season:

Team	Home city	Stadium	Capacity	Head coach
Alania Vladikavkaz	Vladikavkaz	Republican Spartak Stadium	10,250	(Russia) Soslan Beteev
Arsenal Tula	Tula	Arsenal Stadium	19,241	(Russia) Aleksandr Storozhuk
Chayka Peschanokopskoye	Peschanokopskoye	Chayka Central Stadium	3,445	(Russia) Dmitri Pyatibratov
Fakel Voronezh	Voronezh	Tsentralnyi Profsoyuz Stadion	32,750	(Russia) Dmitri Pyatibratov
Chernomorets Novorossiysk	Novorossiysk	Central Stadium (Trud)	12,500	(Russia) Vadim Garanin
KAMAZ	Naberezhnye Chelny	KAMAZ stadium	6,248	(Russia) Vladimir Klontsak
Neftekhimik Nizhnekamsk	Nizhnekamsk	Neftekhimik Stadium	3,100	(Russia) Kirill Novikov
Rodina Moscow	Moscow	Spartakovets Stadium	5,000	(Russia) Vladimir Gazzayev
Rotor Volgograd	Volgograd	Volgograd Arena	45,316	(Russia) Denis Boyarintsev
Shinnik Yaroslavl	Yaroslavl	Shinnik Stadium	22,990	(Russia) Dmitri Cheryshev
SKA-Khabarovsk	Khabarovsk	Lenin Stadium	14,800	(Russia) Dmitri Voyetskiy
Sokol Saratov	Saratov	Lokomotiv Stadium	15,000	(Belarus) Aleksey Baga
FC Orenburg	Orenburg	Gazovik Stadium	10,046	(Bosnia and Herzegovina) Vladimir Slišković
Tyumen	Tyumen	Geolog Stadium	13,057	(Russia) Igor Menshchikov
Ufa	Ufa	BetBoom Arena	15,234	(Russia) Yevgeni Kharlachyov
Ural Yekaterinburg	Yekaterinburg	Yekaterinburg Arena	35,696	(Russia) Yevgeni Averyanov
Yenisey Krasnoyarsk	Krasnoyarsk	Central Stadium	15,000	(Russia) Andrey Tikhonov

Old logo from 2011 to 2020.

Previous logo, 2020 to 2022.

== Winners and top scorers ==
Season	Winners	Also promoted	Top scorer
1992	Zhemchuzhina-Amerus (West); KAMAZ Naberezhnye Chelny (Centre); Luch Vladivostok (East)	–	(Georgia (country)) Gocha Gogrichiani (Zhemchuzhina-Amerus, West) – 26 (Russia) Oleg Teryokhin (Sokol Saratov, Centre) – 27 (Russia) Vyacheslav Kartashov (Irtysh Omsk, East) – 19
1993	Chernomorets Novorossiysk (West, not promoted); Lada Togliatti (Centre); Dinamo-Gazovik Tyumen (East)	–	(Russia) Sergey Burdin (Chernomorets Novorossiysk, West) – 25 (Russia) Vladimir Filimonov (Zvezda Perm, Centre) – 37 (Russia) Vyacheslav Kamoltsev (Dinamo-Gazovik Tyumen, East) – 22
1994	Chernomorets Novorossiysk	Rostselmash Rostov-on-Don	(Russia) Dmitri Silin (Baltika Kaliningrad) – 35
1995	Baltika Kaliningrad	Lada Togliatti; Zenit Saint Petersburg	(Russia) Sergei Bulatov (Baltika Kaliningrad) – 29
1996	Dinamo-Gazovik Tyumen	Shinnik Yaroslavl; Fakel Voronezh	(Georgia (country)) Varlam Kilasonia (Lokomotiv Saint Petersburg) – 22
1997	Uralan Elista	–	(Russia) Aleksei Chernov (Lada-Grad Dimitrovgrad) – 29
1998	Saturn Moscow Region	Lokomotiv Nizhny Novgorod	(Brazil) Andradina (Arsenal Tula) – 27
1999	Anzhi Makhachkala	Fakel Voronezh	(Russia) Konstantin Paramonov (Amkar Perm) – 23
2000	Sokol Saratov	Torpedo-ZIL Moscow	(Russia) Andrei Fedkov (Sokol Saratov) – 26
2001	Shinnik Yaroslavl	Uralan Elista	(Russia) Vitaly Kakunin (Neftekhimik Nizhnekamsk) – 20
2002	Rubin Kazan	Chernomorets Novorossiysk	(Russia) Vyacheslav Kamoltsev (Chernomorets Novorossiysk) – 20 (Georgia (country)) David Chaladze (Rubin Kazan) – 20
2003	Amkar Perm	Kuban Krasnodar	(Russia) Aleksandr Panov (Dynamo Saint Petersburg) – 23
2004	Terek Grozny	Tom Tomsk	(Russia) Andrei Fedkov (Terek Grozny) – 38
2005	Luch-Energia Vladivostok	Spartak Nalchik	(Russia) Yevgeni Alkhimov (Lokomotiv Chita) – 24
2006	Khimki	Kuban Krasnodar	(Russia) Yevgeni Alkhimov (Ural Sverdlovsk Oblast) – 25
2007	Shinnik Yaroslavl	Terek Grozny	(Russia) Dmitri Akimov (Sibir Novosibirsk) – 34
2008	FC Rostov	Kuban Krasnodar	(Russia) Denis Popov (Torpedo Moscow/Chernomorets Novorossiysk) – 24
2009	Anzhi Makhachkala	Sibir Novosibirsk; Alania Vladikavkaz	(Russia) Aleksei Medvedev (Sibir Novosibirsk) – 18
2010	Kuban Krasnodar	Volga Nizhny Novgorod; Krasnodar	(Georgia (country)) Otar Martsvaladze (Volga Nizhny Novgorod) – 21
2011–12	Mordovia Saransk	Alania Vladikavkaz	(Russia) Ruslan Mukhametshin (Mordovia Saransk) – 31
2012–13	Ural Sverdlovsk Oblast	Tom Tomsk	(Russia) Spartak Gogniyev (Ural Sverdlovsk Oblast) – 17
2013–14	Mordovia Saransk	Arsenal Tula; Torpedo Moscow; Ufa	(Russia) Aleksandr Kutyin (Arsenal Tula) – 19
2014–15	Krylia Sovetov Samara	Anzhi Makhachkala	(Ivory Coast) Yannick Boli (Anzhi Makhachkala) – 15
2015–16	Gazovik Orenburg	Arsenal Tula; Tom Tomsk	(Russia) Artyom Delkin (Gazovik Orenburg) – 16 (Russia) Khasan Mamtov (Tyumen) – 16 (Russia) Maksim Zhitnev (Sibir Novosibirsk) – 16
2016–17	Dynamo Moscow	Tosno; SKA-Khabarovsk	(Russia) Kirill Panchenko (Dynamo Moscow) – 24
2017–18	Orenburg	Krylia Sovetov Samara; Yenisey Krasnoyarsk	(Russia) Artyom Kulishev (Dynamo Saint Petersburg) – 17
2018–19	Tambov	Sochi	(Russia) Maksim Barsov (Sochi) – 19
2019–20	Rotor Volgograd	Khimki	(Russia) Aleksandr Rudenko (Spartak-2 Moscow/Torpedo Moscow) – 14 (Russia) Ivan Sergeyev (Torpedo Moscow) – 14
2020–21	Krylia Sovetov Samara	Nizhny Novgorod	(Russia) Ivan Sergeyev (Krylia Sovetov Samara) – 40
2021–22	Torpedo Moscow	Fakel Voronezh; Orenburg	(Russia) Maksim Maksimov (Fakel Voronezh) – 22
2022–23	Rubin Kazan	Baltika Kaliningrad	(Bosnia and Herzegovina) Gedeon Guzina (Baltika Kaliningrad) – 14 (Russia) Ivan Timoshenko (Rodina) – 14
2023–24	Khimki	Dynamo Makhachkala; Akron Tolyatti	(Nigeria) Jonathan Okoronkwo (Arsenal) – 17
2024–25	Baltika Kaliningrad	Torpedo Moscow; Sochi	(Croatia) Martin Sekulić (Ural) – 14
2025–26	Rodina Moscow	Fakel Voronezh	(Russia) Artyom Maksimenko (Rodina) – 17

== See also ==
- List of attendance figures at domestic professional sports leagues
