= 2009 Russian First Division =

Russian First Division
- Season: 2009

The 2009 Russian First Division was the 18th season of Russia's second-tier football league since the dissolution of the Soviet Union. The season began on 28 March 2009 and ended on 4 November 2009.

== Teams ==
The league has been reduced from 22 to 20 teams. It features eleven clubs from 2008 Russian First Division, two clubs relegated from 2008 Russian Premier League, five zone winners from 2008 Russian Second Division and two of the third-placed clubs from 2008 Russian Second Division.

=== Movement between Premier League and First Division ===
FC Rostov as 2008 champions and Kuban Krasnodar as runners-up have been promoted to the Premier League. They will be replaced by relegated teams Shinnik Yaroslavl and Luch-Energia Vladivostok.

=== Movement between First Division and Second Division ===
Due to the league contraction, seven instead of the regular five teams were relegated to their respective Second Division group. These teams, ranked 16th through 22nd in 2008, were Metallurg-Kuzbass Novokuznetsk, Volga Ulyanovsk, Torpedo Moscow, Mashuk-KMV Pyatigorsk, Dinamo Barnaul, Dinamo Bryansk and Zvezda Irkutsk.

The relegated teams were replaced by the five 2008 Second Division zone winners. These were MVD Rossii Moscow (West), Metallurg Lipetsk (Center), Volgar-Gazprom-2 Astrakhan (South), Volga Nizhny Novgorod (Ural-Povolzhye) and FC Chita (East).

=== Further team changes ===
Sportakademklub Moscow avoided relegation in 2008 by finishing 15th, but announced refusal to play in the First Division on 18 December 2008. On 15 January 2009, SKA Rostov-on-Don refused to play as well. Regulations provided that Sportakademclub and SKA should be replaced by two of the runners-up from the Second Division groups (FC Bataysk-2007, FC Torpedo Vladimir, FC Gazovik Orenburg, FC Avangard Kursk or FC Smena Komsomolsk-on-Amur). However, since all of those teams refused promotion, the places were eventually filled by third-place finishers FC Nizhny Novgorod and FC Krasnodar.

=== Overview ===
Location of the teams participating in the 2009 season

Team	Location	Head coach	Captain	Venue	Capacity	Position in 2008
Alania	Vladikavkaz	(Romania) Mircea Rednic	Kamalutdin Akhmedov	Republican Spartak	32,464	10th
Anzhi	Makhachkala	(Russia) Omari Tetradze	Rasim Tagirbekov	Dynamo	16,800	6th
Baltika	Kaliningrad	(Ukraine) Leonid Tkachenko	Denis Matyola	Baltika	14,660	7th
Chernomorets	Novorossiysk	(Russia) Igor Cherniy (caretaker)		Tsentralny (Trud)	12,500	9th
FC Chita	Chita	(Russia) Oleg Kokarev	Ilya Makiyenko	Lokomotiv	10,200	1st, D2 "East"
KAMAZ	Naberezhnye Chelny	(Russia) Vitali Panov (caretaker)	Spartak Gogniyev	KAMAZ	9,221	3rd
FC Krasnodar	Krasnodar	(Russia) Nurbiy Khakunov	Maksim Demenko	Kuban	35,200	3rd, D2 "South"
Luch-Energiya	Vladivostok	(Russia) Aleksandr Pobegalov		Dinamo	10,200	16th, RPL
Metallurg	Lipetsk	(Russia) Valeri Tretyakov (caretaker)		Metallurg	14,940	1st, D2 "Center"
MVD Rossii	Moscow	(Russia) Vladimir Eshtrekov		Avangard, Domodedovo	6,000	1st, D2 "West"
FC Nizhny Novgorod	Nizhny Novgorod	(Russia) Viktor Zaidenberg	Oleg Gubanov	Severny	3,180	3rd, D2 "Ural-Povolzhye"
Nosta	Novotroitsk	(Russia) Gennady Gridin	Ruslan Surodin	Metallurg	6,060	5th
Salyut-Energiya	Belgorod	(Russia) Sergei Tashuev	Sergei Kushov	Salyut	11,500	12th
Shinnik	Yaroslavl	(Russia) Yuri Bykov	Roman Monaryov	Shinnik	18,500 (in reconstruction time)	15th, RPL
Sibir	Novosibirsk	(Belarus) Igor Kriushenko	Aleksey Medvedev	Spartak	12,500	14th
SKA-Energiya	Khabarovsk	(Russia) Vladimir Faizulin	Andrey Konovalov	Lenin Stadium	15,200	8th
Ural	Yekaterinburg	(Russia) Vladimir Fedotov	Aleksey Katulsky	Uralmash	13,000	4th
Vityaz	Podolsk	(Russia) Andrei Novosadov (caretaker)	Andrei Smirnov	Trud	12,000	11th
Volga	Nizhny Novgorod	(Russia) Khazret Dyshekov	Vitali Astakhov	Polyot	4,600	1st, D2 "Ural-Povolzhye"
Volgar-Gazprom-2	Astrakhan	(Russia) Aleksandr Ignatenko	Nail Magzhanov	Centralny	18,500	1st, D2 "South"

FC MVD Rossii resigned from the league on 17 July after playing 19 matches. The team was in the 19th position with 17 points.

==== Managerial changes ====
Team	Outgoing	Manner	Date	Table	Incoming	Date	Table
Chernomorets	(Russia) Nikolai Yuzhanin	Sacked	1 May 2009	20th	(Russia) Eduard Sarkisov (caretaker)		
Shinnik	(Russia) Sergei Pavlov	Sacked	12 May 2009	10th	(Russia) Ivan Lyakh	12 May 2009	10th
Luch-Energiya	(Lithuania) Benjaminas Zelkevičius	Sacked	16 May 2009	19th	(Russia) Konstantin Yemelyanov (caretaker)		
Baltika	(Russia) Zurab Sanaya	Sacked	29 May 2009	10th	(Ukraine) Leonid Tkachenko	8 June 2009	8th
Nosta	(Russia) Sergei Podpaly	Sacked	3 June 2009	16th	(Russia) Oleg Samatov (caretaker)		
Volga	(Russia) Sergei Petrenko	Sacked	5 June 2009	19th	(Russia) Sergei Perednya (caretaker)		
FC Nizhny Novgorod	(Russia) Mikhail Afonin	Sacked	6 June 2009	17th	(Russia) Viktor Zaidenberg		
MVD Rossii	(Russia) Yuri Kovtun	Sacked	8 June 2009	16th	(Russia) Vladimir Eshtrekov		
Metallurg Lipetsk	(Russia) Gennadi Styopushkin	Sacked	16 June 2009	17th	(Russia) Valeri Tretyakov (caretaker)		
Luch-Energiya	(Russia) Konstantin Yemelyanov (caretaker)	Finished	23 June 2009	14th	(Spain) Francisco Arcos		
Nosta	(Russia) Oleg Samatov (caretaker)	Finished	26 June 2009	14th	(Russia) Gennady Gridin		
Ural	(Russia) Aleksandr Pobegalov	Sacked	13 July 2009	5th	(Russia) Vladimir Fedotov		
Volga	(Russia) Sergei Perednya (caretaker)	Finished	5 June 2009	16th	(Russia) Khazret Dyshekov		
Chernomorets	(Russia) Eduard Sarkisov (caretaker)	Finished	24 July 2009	20th	(Russia) Aleksandr Irkhin		
Alania	(Russia) Valeriy Petrakov	Sacked	10 August 2009	3rd	(Russia) Aleksandr Yanovskiy (caretaker)		
Luch-Energiya	(Spain) Francisco Arcos	Finished	11 August 2009	16th	(Russia) Aleksandr Pobegalov		
Alania	(Russia) Aleksandr Yanovskiy (caretaker)	Finished	19 August 2009	3rd	(Romania) Mircea Rednic		
Chernomorets	(Russia) Aleksandr Irkhin	Finished	3 September 2009	19th	(Russia) Igor Cherniy		
Vityaz	(Russia) Sergei Balakhnin	Sacked	18 September 2009	13th	(Russia) Andrei Novosadov (caretaker)		
Shinnik	(Russia) Ivan Lyakh	Sacked	1 October 2009	4th	(Russia) Yuri Bykov		
KAMAZ	(Russia) Yuri Gazzaev	Finished	13 October 2009	7th	(Russia) Vitali Panov (caretaker)		

== Standings ==
Pos	Team	Pld	W	D	L	GF	GA	GD	Pts	Promotion or relegation
1	Anzhi Makhachkala (P)	38	21	12	5	61	31	+30	75	Promotion to Premier League
2	Sibir Novosibirsk (P)	38	22	7	9	60	21	+39	73	Promotion to Premier League and qualification to Europa League third qualifying round (Note: Since the 2009–10 Russian Cup winners Zenit St. Petersburg qualified for the Champions League, their UEFA Cup berth was carried down to the finalists, Sibir Novosibirsk.)
3	Alania Vladikavkaz (Note: Alania Vladikavkaz accepted promotion to the 2010 Russian Premier League upon the withdrawal of FC Moscow.) (P)	38	21	7	10	57	30	+27	70	Promotion to Premier League
4	Volga Nizhny Novgorod	38	17	14	7	54	32	+22	65	
5	KAMAZ Naberezhnye Chelny	38	18	10	10	50	31	+19	64	
6	Shinnik Yaroslavl	38	18	7	13	46	35	+11	61	
7	Salyut-Energia Belgorod	38	17	10	11	54	41	+13	61	
8	Ural Sverdlovsk Oblast	38	15	15	8	40	32	+8	60	
9	Baltika Kaliningrad	38	14	10	14	41	42	−1	52	
10	Krasnodar	38	14	10	14	50	47	+3	52	
11	Vityaz Podolsk	38	13	12	13	46	39	+7	51	
12	Volgar-Gazprom-2 Astrakhan	38	12	15	11	40	41	−1	51	
13	Nizhny Novgorod	38	14	8	16	37	47	−10	50	
14	Luch-Energiya Vladivostok	38	13	11	14	42	43	−1	50	
15	SKA-Khabarovsk	38	12	11	15	43	42	+1	47	
16	Nosta Novotroitsk (R)	38	9	13	16	47	59	−12	40	Relegation to Second Division
17	Chita (R)	38	10	5	23	27	65	−38	35	Relegation to Second Division
18	Chernomorets Novorossiysk (R)	38	8	10	20	31	51	−20	34	Relegation to Second Division
19	Metallurg Lipetsk (R)	38	8	7	23	30	62	−32	31	Relegation to Second Division
20	MVD Rossii Moscow (R)	38	3	8	27	10	75	−65	17	Relegation to Second Division

Source: PFL, Soccerway
Rules for classification: 1st points; 2nd matches won; 3rd head-to-head (points, matches won, goal difference, goals scored, away goals scored); 4th goal difference; 5th goals scored; 6th away goals scored
(P) Promoted; (R) Relegated

== Results ==
Home \ Away	ALA	ANZ	BAL	CHM	CHI	KAM	KRA	LUE	MLI	MVD	NN	NOS	SAL	SHI	SIB	SKA	URA	VIT	VNN	VGA
Alania Vladikavkaz		0–1	1–2	2–0	3–0	2–3	2–2	3–0	2–0	1–0	2–0	4–0	0–1	2–0	1–0	2–1	0–0	1–0	0–1	3–1
Anzhi Makhachkala	0–0		2–0	2–0	3–0	1–1	1–1	2–0	3–0	1–0	4–0	4–1	0–0	1–0	2–1	3–1	0–0	2–1	2–2	1–0
Baltika Kaliningrad	3–1	0–0		1–0	2–1	2–0	1–0	1–2	3–0	3–0	2–2	3–0	2–2	0–2	0–3	0–2	1–2	2–1	0–0	1–1
Chernomorets Novorossiysk	0–1	1–2	0–3		3–0	1–0	1–2	0–1	1–1	3–0	1–1	2–2	1–1	1–1	2–1	4–0	1–1	1–1	0–0	1–1
Chita	0–2	0–2	1–0	2–0		1–0	1–2	1–6	1–0	3–0	0–2	0–0	1–3	1–0	0–4	0–4	0–1	3–3	3–2	1–2
KAMAZ Naberezhnye Chelny	1–1	1–1	0–1	1–1	2–0		2–1	2–0	1–1	3–0	3–0	3–1	0–0	0–1	2–1	3–1	1–1	3–1	2–0	0–0
Krasnodar	5–1	0–1	0–0	1–0	1–0	0–1		3–1	1–0	3–0	1–0	1–2	2–0	1–3	2–3	3–1	2–2	1–1	1–3	2–2
Luch-Energiya Vladivostok	1–1	3–2	2–0	2–0	1–1	0–0	2–1		1–0	0–0	2–0	1–1	0–0	0–2	1–0	2–2	0–0	0–1	2–2	2–2
Metallurg Lipetsk	1–5	2–1	1–1	1–2	0–1	0–2	1–3	1–2		3–0	3–0	0–1	2–1	0–0	0–0	1–6	2–1	0–3	0–0	1–2
MVD Rossii Moscow	0–3	0–3	2–1	2–1	0–0	1–3	0–1	0–3	0–2		0–3	0–3	0–1	0–1	0–3	0–3	0–3	0–3	0–0	0–3
Nizhny Novgorod	0–2	1–1	1–0	1–0	0–1	0–2	1–2	2–0	2–1	1–1		2–0	2–1	0–1	1–0	1–1	0–0	3–2	0–1	0–0
Nosta Novotroitsk	2–2	2–2	0–1	0–1	2–0	1–2	4–0	2–0	1–2	2–2	2–3		2–2	3–1	1–1	1–3	0–0	1–1	0–0	3–1
Salyut-Energia Belgorod	2–0	3–0	3–2	1–0	5–2	1–0	2–1	1–0	5–1	3–0	0–2	2–0		1–2	0–0	2–0	2–0	1–1	1–1	1–0
Shinnik Yaroslavl	1–2	3–0	0–0	0–1	0–2	2–0	1–1	1–3	1–0	3–0	3–0	2–1	4–2		3–1	1–0	1–2	1–1	1–0	0–0
Sibir Novosibirsk	1–0	2–1	6–0	4–0	3–0	1–0	1–0	1–0	2–0	0–0	0–0	3–0	4–0	1–0		0–0	1–0	2–1	0–0	4–0
SKA-Khabarovsk	0–0	2–3	0–1	2–0	1–0	0–0	1–1	0–0	2–0	1–1	1–0	1–2	1–0	0–2	0–1		2–0	1–0	0–0	0–2
Ural Sverdlovsk Oblast	0–1	0–2	0–0	1–0	1–0	0–3	1–1	2–1	1–2	2–0	3–1	0–0	1–0	3–1	2–1	2–1		2–1	2–2	2–0
Vityaz Podolsk	0–1	1–1	2–1	4–1	0–0	1–2	2–0	1–0	2–0	0–0	1–0	2–1	3–1	1–0	0–2	1–1	0–0		0–2	2–0
Volga Nizhny Novgorod	0–3	1–1	1–0	4–0	3–0	4–1	2–1	2–0	1–0	3–0	1–2	4–2	2–1	4–1	2–0	3–1	1–1	0–0		0–3
Volgar-Gazprom-2 Astrakhan	1–0	1–3	1–1	1–0	2–0	1–0	0–0	3–1	1–1	0–1	2–3	1–1	2–2	0–0	0–2	0–0	1–1	2–1	1–0	

Source: PFL (in Russian)
Legend: Blue = home team win; Yellow = draw; Red = away team win.

== Top scorers ==
Last updated: 4 November 2009; Source: PFL (in Russian)

Rank	Player	Team	Goals
1	(Russia) Aleksei Medvedev	Sibir	18
2	(Russia) Spartak Gogniyev	KAMAZ	17
3	(Uzbekistan) Vladimir Shishelov	Ural	16
4	(Russia) Roman Grigoryan	Vityaz	15
5	(Georgia (country)) Otar Martsvaladze	Anzhi	13
6	(Russia) Nikita Burmistrov	Shinnik	12
6	(Moldova) Serghei Dadu	Alania	12
8	(Russia) Anton Khazov	Volga	10
9	(Russia) Sergei Davydov	Volgar-Gazprom-2	9
9	(Ukraine) Denys Dedechko	Luch-Energiya	9
9	(Moldova) Nicolae Josan	Anzhi	9
9	(Russia) Vasili Karmazinenko	SKA-Energiya	9

== Awards ==
On 25 November 2009, Professional Football League announced the award winners for the season.

- Best player: Aleksei Medvedev (FC Sibir Novosibirsk).
- Best goalkeeper: Sergei Chepchugov (FC Sibir Novosibirsk).
- Best defender: Rasim Tagirbekov (FC Anzhi Makhachkala).
- Best midfielder: (Moldova) Nicolae Josan (FC Anzhi Makhachkala).
- Best striker: Aleksei Medvedev.
- Best manager: Omari Tetradze (FC Anzhi Makhachkala).

== See also ==
- 2009 Russian Premier League
