= 2010 Russian First Division =

Russian First Division
- Season: 2010

The 2010 Russian First Division was the 19th season of Russia's second-tier football league since the dissolution of the Soviet Union. The season began on 27 March 2010.

== Teams ==
As in the previous year, 20 clubs participate in this year championship. It features eleven clubs from 2009 Russian First Division, two clubs relegated from 2009 Russian Premier League, five zone winners from 2009 Russian Second Division, one of the second-placed clubs from 2009 Russian Second Division and one of the third-placed clubs from 2009 Russian Second Division.

=== Movement between Premier League and First Division ===
Anzhi Makhachkala as 2009 champions and Sibir Novosibirsk as runners-up have been promoted to the Premier League. They will be replaced by relegated teams Kuban Krasnodar and Khimki.

=== Movement between First Division and Second Division ===
Nosta Novotroitsk, Chita, Chernomorets Novorossiysk, Metallurg Lipetsk and MVD Rossii Moscow who placed in the last 5 places respectively in 2009 were relegated to the Russian Second Division.

The relegated teams were replaced by the five 2009 Second Division zone winners. These were Dynamo Saint Petersburg (West), Avangard Kursk (Centre), Zhemchuzhina-Sochi (South), Mordovia Saransk (Ural-Povolzhye) and Irtysh Omsk (East).

=== Further team changes ===
Due to financial difficulties, Vityaz Podolsk who placed 11th in 2009, decided to give up their spot in the Russian First Division and participate in the Russian Second Division in 2010.

Pending licensing, their place was taken by FC Volgograd who placed 3rd in the Russian Second Division (South Zone) in 2009. For the occasion the management decided to change the name of the club from FC Volgograd to Rotor Volgograd.

FC Alania Vladikavkaz were promoted into the 2010 Russian Premier League after FC Moscow dropped out due to financial reasons. It was replaced by FC Dynamo Bryansk. Dynamo Bryansk originally refused to be promoted when offered Vityaz's spot, but by the time Alania's spot became available, they found new financial commitments and agreed to participate in the First Division.

== Overview ==
Location of teams in 2010 Russian First Division

Team	Location	Head Coach	Captain	Venue	Capacity	Position in 2009
Avangard	Kursk	(Russia) Aleksandr Ignatenko		Trudovye Rezervy	11,329	1st, D2 "Centre"
Baltika	Kaliningrad	(Russia) Leonid Tkachenko		Baltika	14,664	9th
Dynamo Bryansk	Bryansk	(Russia) Aleksandr Smirnov		Dynamo	10,100	2nd, D2 "Centre"
Dynamo St. Petersburg	Saint Petersburg	(Russia) Sergey Frantsev		MSA Petrovsky	2,835	1st, D2 "West"
Irtysh	Omsk	(Russia) Aleksandr Dorofeyev		Red Star	8,000	1st, D2 "East"
KAMAZ	Naberezhnye Chelny	(Russia) Robert Yevdokimov		KAMAZ	9,221	5th
Khimki	Khimki	(Russia) Yevgeni Bushmanov		Novyye Khimki	3,066	16th, Premier
Krasnodar	Krasnodar	(Russia) Sergei Tashuev		Kuban	34,640	10th
Kuban	Krasnodar	(Romania) Dan Petrescu		Kuban	34,640	15th, Premier
Luch-Energiya	Vladivostok	(Spain) Francisco Arcos		Dinamo	10,185	14th
Mordovia	Saransk	(Russia) Fyodor Shcherbachenko		Svetotekhnika	14,000	1st, D2 "Ural-Povolzhye"
Nizhny Novgorod	Nizhny Novgorod	(Russia) Viktor Zaidenberg		Severny	3,180	13th
Rotor	Volgograd	(Russia) Vitaliy Shevchenko		Central	32,126	3rd, D2 "South"
Salyut	Belgorod	(Russia) Yuri Bykov		Salyut	11,500	7th
Shinnik	Yaroslavl	(Russia) Aleksandr Pobegalov		Shinnik	18,481	6th
SKA-Energiya	Khabarovsk	(Russia) Sergey Feldman		Lenin Stadium	15,200	15th
Ural	Yekaterinburg	(Russia) Vladimir Fedotov		Uralmash	13,000	8th
Volga	Nizhny Novgorod	(Russia) Omari Tetradze		Lokomotiv	17,856	4th
Volgar-Gazprom	Astrakhan	(Russia) Lev Ivanov		Centralny	20,500	12th
Zhemchuzhina-Sochi	Sochi	(Russia) Oleg Vasilenko		Central	10,280	1st, D2 "South"

=== Managerial changes ===
Team	Outgoing	Manner	Date	Table	Incoming	Date	Table
Dynamo St. Petersburg	(Russia) Aleksandr Averyanov	Resigned	15 April 2010	19th	(Russia) Grigori Mikhalyuk (caretaker)		
Dynamo Bryansk	(Russia) Soferbi Yeshugov	Sacked	7 May 2010	20th	(Russia) Sergei Ovchinnikov	7 May 2010	20th
Volga Nizhny Novgorod	(Russia) Aleksandr Pobegalov	Resigned	8 May 2010	12th	(Russia) Omari Tetradze	8 May 2010	12th
Shinnik Yaroslavl	(Russia) Igor Lediakhov	Sacked	11 May 2010	18th	(Russia) Aleksandr Pobegalov	11 May 2010	12th
Ural Sverdlovsk Oblast	(Russia) Vladimir Fedotov	Sacked	11 May 2010	7th	(Russia) Boris Stukalov	14 May 2010	7th
Dynamo St. Petersburg	(Russia) Grigori Mikhalyuk (caretaker)	Finished	19 May 2010	10th	(Russia) Boris Zhuravlyov	19 May 2010	
Salyut Belgorod	(Belarus) Miroslav Romaschenko	Sacked	20 May 2010	16th	(Belarus) Leonid Koutchouk	20 May 2010	16th
Luch-Energiya	(Russia) Leonid Nazarenko	Sacked	22 May 2010	13th	(Spain) Francisco Arcos (caretaker)	22 May 2010	13th
Baltika	(Russia) Ivan Lyakh	Sacked	5 June 2010	13th	(Russia) Leonid Tkachenko		
Rotor	(Russia) Vladimir Faizulin	Sacked	26 June 2010	20th	(Russia) Vitaliy Shevchenko	27 June 2010	20th
Dynamo St. Petersburg	(Russia) Boris Zhuravlyov	Sacked	22 July 2010	17th	(Belarus) Eduard Malofeyev	22 July 2010	20th
Khimki	(Russia) Aleksandr Tarkhanov		30 July 2010	9th	(Russia) Yevgeni Bushmanov (caretaker)		
Zhemchuzhina-Sochi	(Russia) Oleg Vasilenko		2 August 2010	4th	(Russia) Zurab Sanaya		
Avangard Kursk	(Russia) Valery Yesipov	Sacked	17 August 2010	19th	(Russia) Oleg Sergeyev (caretaker)		
Dynamo St. Petersburg	(Belarus) Eduard Malofeyev	Sacked	20 August 2010	20th	(Russia) Sergey Frantsev		
Salyut Belgorod	(Belarus) Leonid Koutchouk	Sacked	23 August 2010	19th	(Russia) Yuri Bykov	23 August 2010	19th
Irtysh Omsk	(Russia) Vladimir Arays	Sacked	2 September 2010	20th	(Russia) Aleksandr Dorofeyev	2 September 2010	
Avangard Kursk	(Russia) Oleg Sergeyev (caretaker)	Finished	17 September 2010	19th	(Russia) Aleksandr Ignatenko		
Dynamo Bryansk	(Russia) Sergei Ovchinnikov	Sacked	17 September 2010	18th	(Russia) Aleksandr Smirnov	17 September 2010	18th
Zhemchuzhina-Sochi	(Russia) Zurab Sanaya		27 September 2010	5th	(Russia) Oleg Vasilenko		
SKA-Energiya	(Russia) Sergei Gorlukovich	Sacked	28 September 2010	15th	(Russia) Sergey Feldman		

== Standings ==
Pos	Team	Pld	W	D	L	GF	GA	GD	Pts	Promotion or relegation
1	Kuban Krasnodar (C, P)	38	24	8	6	51	20	+31	80	Promotion to Premier League
2	Volga Nizhny Novgorod (P)	38	19	14	5	62	25	+37	71	Promotion to Premier League
3	Nizhny Novgorod	38	21	7	10	60	41	+19	70	
4	KAMAZ Naberezhnye Chelny	38	19	9	10	55	43	+12	66	
5	Krasnodar (P)	38	17	10	11	60	44	+16	61	Promotion to Premier League
6	Mordovia Saransk	38	16	10	12	53	40	+13	58	
7	Ural Sverdlovsk Oblast	38	14	16	8	38	28	+10	58	
8	Zhemchuzhina-Sochi	38	16	9	13	45	44	+1	57	
9	Volgar-Gazprom Astrakhan	38	16	9	13	45	48	−3	57	
10	Shinnik Yaroslavl	38	14	13	11	43	31	+12	55	
11	SKA-Khabarovsk	38	15	8	15	37	39	−2	53	
12	Luch-Energiya Vladivostok	38	13	13	12	42	42	0	52	
13	Khimki	38	11	17	10	39	38	+1	50	
14	Dynamo Bryansk	38	11	11	16	53	54	−1	44	
15	Baltika Kaliningrad	38	11	10	17	38	47	−9	43	
16	Dynamo St. Petersburg (R)	38	9	10	19	32	53	−21	37	Relegation to Second Division
17	Salyut Belgorod (R)	38	7	13	18	30	47	−17	34	Relegation to Second Division
18	Rotor Volgograd (R)	38	9	7	22	27	64	−37	34	Relegation to Second Division
19	Irtysh Omsk (R)	38	6	10	22	26	52	−26	28	Relegation to Second Division
20	Avangard Kursk (R)	38	7	6	25	31	67	−36	27	Relegation to Second Division

Source: PFL, Soccerway
Rules for classification: 1st points; 2nd matches won; 3rd head-to-head (points, matches won, goal difference, goals scored, away goals scored); 4th goal difference; 5th goals scored; 6th away goals scored
(C) Champions; (P) Promoted; (R) Relegated

== Results ==
Home \ Away	AVA	BAL	DBR	DSP	IRT	KAM	KHI	KRA	KUB	LUE	MOR	NN	ROT	SAL	SHI	SKA	URA	VNN	VGA	ZHE
Avangard Kursk		1–1	1–2	0–0	2–1	2–1	0–1	1–2	1–2	1–2	1–1	1–5	1–3	2–0	1–6	1–5	0–1	1–0	1–0	1–0
Baltika Kaliningrad	2–1		1–2	2–0	2–1	2–4	3–1	1–1	0–1	1–0	2–2	1–0	3–2	0–0	0–1	1–2	0–1	0–0	1–1	2–1
Dynamo Bryansk	1–0	0–1		4–1	2–1	4–0	1–1	4–3	0–2	1–1	0–0	1–1	0–1	2–2	0–1	5–0	0–2	0–1	2–3	1–0
Dynamo St. Petersburg	1–0	0–2	0–0		2–0	1–1	0–2	0–0	0–0	1–2	1–3	0–1	4–1	2–0	2–5	2–1	1–1	1–1	1–1	0–1
Irtysh Omsk	2–1	2–0	1–4	0–2		0–0	0–0	0–0	2–3	0–3	0–0	1–0	2–0	1–1	1–1	0–1	1–0	1–1	1–4	0–1
KAMAZ Naberezhnye Chelny	2–0	2–1	1–1	2–0	1–2		1–1	1–0	1–2	1–0	2–1	3–2	2–0	2–1	1–2	1–1	1–1	1–1	3–1	2–0
Khimki	3–0	1–0	2–2	4–1	1–1	0–2		0–0	0–1	1–1	0–3	1–1	1–3	1–0	1–1	0–0	1–1	1–0	1–1	3–1
Krasnodar	0–0	3–1	5–1	0–0	2–0	3–2	1–1		0–1	3–0	4–1	4–2	3–0	2–0	2–1	3–0	1–0	3–3	2–0	1–1
Kuban Krasnodar	2–0	0–0	1–0	2–0	2–1	0–1	1–0	3–0		3–0	0–2	0–0	3–0	0–0	1–1	1–0	3–0	1–0	6–1	0–1
Luch-Energiya Vladivostok	4–3	2–1	0–3	1–0	1–1	0–1	0–0	1–1	0–1		2–0	3–1	1–1	2–0	3–1	0–0	1–0	1–1	0–1	2–1
Mordovia Saransk	0–1	1–0	3–2	2–1	2–1	1–2	2–1	1–2	3–0	0–0		3–1	3–1	0–1	1–0	0–2	1–1	2–0	1–1	1–1
Nizhny Novgorod	3–2	2–0	3–1	1–0	2–1	3–1	2–0	4–3	3–1	3–1	0–1		3–0	3–0	1–0	2–0	1–0	2–2	0–0	0–0
Rotor Volgograd	1–0	1–0	1–0	1–2	0–0	1–0	0–1	0–1	0–3	2–2	0–6	0–2		0–1	1–0	0–2	1–2	1–4	0–1	1–0
Salyut Belgorod	0–0	1–1	4–2	1–2	1–0	2–0	1–2	1–2	1–2	0–1	1–1	0–1	2–1		0–0	2–4	1–1	0–0	1–2	1–0
Shinnik Yaroslavl	2–0	1–1	1–0	0–0	1–0	1–2	0–0	1–0	0–1	3–2	0–0	0–1	1–1	1–1		3–0	1–1	0–0	2–0	0–1
SKA-Khabarovsk	2–1	1–0	0–0	0–1	1–0	0–2	1–1	1–0	0–0	0–0	3–1	0–1	2–0	2–1	2–3		0–0	1–2	1–0	2–0
Ural Sverdlovsk Oblast	0–0	1–0	3–3	2–0	1–0	1–1	0–2	3–1	0–0	1–0	1–0	3–0	4–0	0–0	0–0	1–0		0–1	2–0	1–1
Volga Nizhny Novgorod	3–0	4–1	1–1	3–0	3–0	2–2	2–0	4–1	0–0	2–2	3–0	3–0	0–0	1–0	1–0	2–0	3–0		3–1	3–0
Volgar-Gazprom Astrakhan	3–1	2–2	3–0	3–2	2–0	0–1	2–2	2–1	2–1	2–1	0–3	2–1	0–0	2–0	0–1	1–0	0–0	1–0		0–3
Zhemchuzhina-Sochi	3–2	1–2	2–1	3–1	2–1	3–2	2–1	2–0	0–1	0–0	2–1	2–2	2–2	2–2	2–1	1–0	2–2	0–2	1–0	

Source: PFL (in Russian)
Legend: Blue = home team win; Yellow = draw; Red = away team win.

== Top scorers ==
Last updated: 6 November 2010; Source: PFL (in Russian)

Rank	Player	Team	Goals
1	(Georgia (country)) Otar Martsvaladze	Volga	21
2	(Russia) Spartak Gogniyev	KAMAZ / Krasnodar	18
3	(Russia) Sergei Davydov	Volgar-Gazprom / Kuban	16
4	(Russia) Dmitri Golubov	Baltika	15
5	(Russia) Ruslan Mukhametshin	Mordovia	13
5	(Russia) Sergei Serdyukov	KAMAZ	13
5	(Russia) Aleksandr Tikhonovetsky	Nizhny Novgorod	13
8	(Russia) Azamat Gonezhukov	Dynamo St. Petersburg	12
9	(Russia) Maksim Demenko	Krasnodar / Zhemchuzhina-Sochi	11
9	(Russia) Yevgeni Kaleshin	Krasnodar	11
9	(Russia) Kirill Panchenko	Mordovia	11
12	(Russia) Vasiliy Karmazinenko	SKA-Energiya	10

== Awards ==
Professional Football League announced the award winners for the season.

- Best player: Andrey Tikhonov (FC Khimki).
- Best goalkeeper: Aleksandr Budakov (FC Kuban Krasnodar).
- Best defender: (Serbia) Milan Vještica (FC Shinnik Yaroslavl).
- Best midfielder: Andrey Tikhonov (FC Khimki).
- Best striker: Spartak Gogniyev (FC Krasnodar).
- Best manager: Robert Yevdokimov (FC KAMAZ Naberezhnye Chelny).

== See also ==
- 2010 Russian Premier League
