= 1998 Russian First Division =

Russian First Division
- Season: 1998

The 1998 Russian First Division was the seventh edition of the Russian First Division. The competition was renamed from Russian First League to Russian First Division this year.

== Overview ==
Team	Head coach
FC Saturn Ramenskoye	Sergei Pavlov
FC Lokomotiv Nizhny Novgorod	Valeri Ovchinnikov
FC Sokol Saratov	Anatoli Radenko (Ukraine) (until May); Anatoli Aslamov (caretaker, May–June); Vladimir Fedotov (from June)
FC Kristall Smolensk	Valeri Nenenko
FC Arsenal Tula	Yevhen Kucherevskyi (Ukraine)
FC Lada-Grad Dimitrovgrad	Vladimir Yevsyukov
FC Rubin Kazan	Igor Volchok (until May); Miodrag Radanović (Federal Republic of Yugoslavia) (caretaker, May); Aleksandr Irkhin (from June)
FC Dynamo Stavropol	Boris Stukalov
FC Gazovik-Gazprom Izhevsk	Vyacheslav Melnikov (until April); Aleksandr Salnov (caretaker, April–August); Viktor Slesarev (from August)
FC Fakel Voronezh	Sergei Savchenkov
FC Lokomotiv Chita	Aleksandr Kovalyov
FC Anzhi Makhachkala	Eduard Malofeyev (Belarus) (until June); Aleksandr Reshetnyak (caretaker, June–August); Pyotr Shubin (September); Aleksandr Reshetnyak (caretaker, from September)
FC Metallurg Lipetsk	Vladimir Fedotov (until June); Yuri Shishlov (caretaker, June); Valeri Tretyakov (from June)
FC Tom Tomsk	Vladimir Yurin
PFC Spartak Nalchik	Viktor Kumykov (until July); Viktor Zernov (July to October); Aslanbek Khantsev (from October)
FC Lokomotiv St. Petersburg	Givi Nodia (Georgia (country))
FC Neftekhimik Nizhnekamsk	Gennadi Sarychev (until June); Vladimir Morozov (caretaker, June); Boris Sinitsyn (from June)
FC Druzhba Maykop	Vitali Aksyonov (until July); Soferbi Yeshugov (from July)
FC Lada-Togliatti-VAZ Togliatti	Vladimir Dergach (until October); Igor Golubtsov (October); Aleksandr Garmashov (from November)
FC Kuban Krasnodar	Valeri Sinau (until May); Adolf Poskotin (from May)
FC Irtysh Omsk	Aleksandr Ivchenko (until July); Gennadi Kostylev (from July)
FC KAMAZ-Chally Naberezhnye Chelny	Ivan Butaliy

== Standings ==
Pos	Team	Pld	W	D	L	GF	GA	GD	Pts	Promotion or relegation
1	Saturn Ramenskoye (P)	42	24	12	6	73	34	+39	84	Promotion to Top Division
2	Lokomotiv N.N. (P)	42	23	8	11	65	34	+31	77	Promotion to Top Division
3	Sokol Saratov (Note: FC Sokol-PZhD Saratov renamed to FC Sokol.)	42	21	13	8	58	32	+26	76	
4	Kristall Smolensk (Note: FC CSK VVS-Kristall Smolensk renamed to FC Kristall after playing 6 games.)	42	23	3	16	59	47	+12	72	
5	Arsenal Tula	42	18	11	13	65	53	+12	65	
6	Lada-Grad Dimitrovgrad	42	19	7	16	65	63	+2	64	
7	Rubin Kazan	42	19	6	17	56	50	+6	63	
8	Dynamo Stavropol	42	16	15	11	51	37	+14	63	
9	Gazovik-Gazprom Izhevsk	42	18	6	18	53	58	−5	60	
10	Fakel Voronezh	42	17	9	16	54	45	+9	60	
11	Anzhi Makhachkala	42	17	6	19	47	56	−9	57	
12	Metallurg Lipetsk	42	16	8	18	41	50	−9	56	
13	Lokomotiv Chita	42	16	8	18	57	50	+7	56 (Note: FC Lokomotiv Chita awarded 5 home wins.)	
14	Tom Tomsk	42	15	11	16	54	45	+9	56	
15	Spartak Nalchik	42	15	11	16	49	52	−3	56	
16	Lokomotiv St. Petersburg	42	14	11	17	38	41	−3	53	
17	Neftekhimik Nizhnekamsk (R)	42	15	7	20	44	56	−12	52	Qualification for Promotion play-offs
18	Druzhba Maykop (R)	42	13	11	18	45	55	−10	50	Relegation to Second Division
19	Lada-Togliatti-VAZ Togliatti (R)	42	15	9	18	52	70	−18	48 (Note: FC Lada-Togliatti-VAZ Togliatti deducted 6 points and awarded 1 home win.)	Relegation to Second Division
20	Kuban Krasnodar (R)	42	10	13	19	42	68	−26	43	Relegation to Second Division
21	Irtysh Omsk (R)	42	11	8	23	36	58	−22	41	Relegation to Second Division
22	KAMAZ-Chally Naberezhnye Chelny (R)	42	7	5	30	32	82	−50	26	Relegation to Second Division

Source: RSSSF
(P) Promoted; (R) Relegated

== Results ==
Home \ Away	ANZ	ARS	DST	DRU	FAK	GGI	IRT	KAM	KRI	KUB	LGD	LTV	LCH	LNN	LSP	MTL	NEF	RUB	SAT	SOK	SPN	TOM
Anzhi Makhachkala		2–1	0–0	4–1	3–1	3–0	1–0	2–1	0–1	1–0	2–1	0–0	3–1	1–0	0–1	3–1	0–2	1–0	3–1	1–1	3–3	2–0
Arsenal Tula	5–2		0–2	0–1	2–0	4–1	3–2	1–1	2–0	3–1	3–1	4–0	1–1	2–0	0–2	0–0	2–1	4–1	0–0	1–1	1–1	2–3
Dynamo Stavropol	2–0	1–0		5–0	1–1	1–0	0–0	2–1	3–2	3–1	2–1	4–1	0–0	0–0	0–0	0–0	2–1	1–2	0–1	2–1	3–1	0–1
Druzhba Maykop	4–2	0–1	1–0		3–2	3–1	3–0	3–1	5–0	3–0	0–0	2–0	2–0	1–3	0–0	1–1	0–0	1–3	1–1	1–1	2–1	1–0
Fakel Voronezh	0–1	1–1	0–0	2–0		4–1	3–1	3–1	3–1	0–0	2–1	1–0	4–1	0–1	0–0	1–0	1–0	2–0	1–1	0–2	0–1	1–0
Gazovik-Gazprom	1–0	0–0	1–0	2–0	0–3		1–0	1–2	2–1	4–0	1–1	3–0	4–1	3–2	3–1	2–1	2–1	2–1	2–1	1–2	1–0	2–0
Irtysh Omsk	0–1	0–1	1–0	4–0	2–1	1–1		2–1	0–1	1–2	0–3	2–1	0–0	2–2	2–0	1–0	3–1	1–1	1–1	0–0	1–0	2–0
KAMAZ-Chally	1–0	0–1	1–2	1–0	5–2	1–1	1–0		3–5	1–2	0–2	1–2	0–4	0–2	0–3	2–1	0–2	2–2	1–2	0–0	0–1	1–0
Kristall Smolensk	2–1	2–0	0–0	3–0	3–0	2–0	1–0	4–1		1–0	6–1	1–0	1–0	0–1	1–0	1–0	2–1	4–1	3–2	2–0	2–1	0–0
Kuban Krasnodar	0–1	1–3	1–1	2–1	1–1	2–0	5–1	3–0	1–2		1–1	1–2	0–0	1–1	1–0	4–2	1–0	1–0	1–1	0–2	0–0	1–1
Lada-Grad Dimitrovgrad	2–0	0–2	1–1	0–0	0–6	2–1	1–0	2–0	1–0	7–2		4–2	3–2	2–1	3–0	3–1	1–0	2–1	2–3	1–0	2–0	3–1
Lada-Togliatti-VAZ	1–0	5–4	1–1	2–1	0–4	3–1	0–0	3–0	2–1	4–1	2–2		1–1	2–0	2–0	1–0	2–1	1–2	0–3	0–0	2–1	1–1
Lokomotiv Chita	2–0	3–0	3–0	2–0	0–0	3–0	2–0	3–0	1–0	4–0	3–0	2–2		2–1	3–0	0–1	3–0	3–1	1–1	1–0	0–1	2–0
Lokomotiv Nizhny Novgorod	3–0	3–0	2–3	1–0	0–1	2–0	3–1	3–0	2–0	3–1	3–1	3–0	3–0		1–0	4–0	0–0	1–0	0–0	2–2	2–0	2–0
Lokomotiv St. Petersburg	0–0	1–1	2–2	2–0	2–1	0–2	0–1	3–1	1–0	2–2	1–2	2–0	3–0	0–2		0–2	1–0	3–0	1–3	0–0	1–0	3–0
Metallurg Lipetsk	1–0	2–2	0–0	3–2	0–2	3–1	2–1	2–0	1–0	1–0	1–0	3–2	2–0	2–0	1–0		0–0	1–0	0–3	3–3	0–1	1–0
Neftekhimik Nizhnekamsk	2–1	3–2	3–2	0–0	2–0	0–0	2–0	0–0	3–2	0–0	1–0	1–2	3–1	2–4	2–1	3–1		2–1	0–4	1–2	0–1	1–0
Rubin Kazan	3–0	1–2	4–2	2–0	2–0	2–1	1–0	1–0	3–0	1–1	2–2	4–0	2–0	0–0	0–1	2–0	3–0		1–0	2–0	1–0	1–0
Saturn Ramenskoye	2–0	2–1	1–1	1–1	1–0	0–1	2–1	2–0	2–0	3–1	2–1	3–0	4–3	1–1	2–0	1–0	3–1	3–0		2–0	1–1	0–0
Sokol Saratov	3–2	3–0	2–0	0–0	3–0	0–0	3–1	3–0	2–0	2–0	4–1	1–0	2–1	2–0	0–0	1–0	0–1	1–0	2–1		3–1	1–1
Spartak Nalchik	5–0	1–1	0–1	1–1	0–0	3–2	4–1	3–0	1–2	0–0	2–1	3–2	2–1	0–1	0–0	0–0	2–1	3–0	1–3	2–1		1–1
Tom Tomsk	1–1	1–2	2–1	1–0	2–0	2–1	3–0	2–1	0–0	4–0	2–1	1–1	3–0	2–0	1–1	3–1	4–0	2–2	0–3	1–2	8–0	

Legend: Blue = home team win; Yellow = draw; Red = away team win.

== Top goalscorers ==
Rank	Player	Team	Goals
1	(Brazil) Andradina	Arsenal	27
2	(Russia) Igor Gavrilin	Saturn	19
3	(Ukraine) Vladyslav Zubkov	Lokomotiv N.N.	18
4	(Azerbaijan) Gurban Gurbanov	Dynamo (St)	17
4	(Russia) Valeri Shushlyakov	Kristall	17
6	(Russia) Aleksei Chernov	Lada-Grad	16
7	(Russia) Oleg Garin	Lokomotiv N.N.	15
7	(Azerbaijan) Ibragim Gasanbekov	Anzhi	15
7	(Russia) Aleksandr Kuzmichyov	Rubin	15
7	(Russia) Vladimir Lebed	Sokol	15

== Promotion play-offs ==
11 November 1998

Neftekhimik Nizhnekamsk	1–1	Torpedo-ZIL Moscow
Zinovyev 15'		Golikov 47'

Neftekhimik Stadium, Nizhnekamsk
Attendance: 1,000
Referee: Taras Bezubyak (St. Petersburg)
16 November 1998

Torpedo-ZIL Moscow	2–0	Neftekhimik Nizhnekamsk
Snigiryov 48'; Panfyorov 56'; Chernov (red card) 89'

Eduard Streltsov Stadium, Moscow
Attendance: 5,000
Referee: Lom-Ali Ibragimov (Grozny)

FC Torpedo-ZIL Moscow promoted to the Russian First Division for 1999 on aggregate, FC Neftekhimik Nizhnekamsk relegated to the Russian Second Division.

== See also ==
- 1998 Russian Top Division
- 1998 Russian Second Division
