= 1996 Russian First League =

Russian First League
- Season: 1996

The 1996 Russian First League was the 5th edition of Russian First Division

== Overview ==
Team	Head coach
FC Dynamo-Gazovik Tyumen	Aleksandr Irkhin
FC Shinnik Yaroslavl	Anatoli Polosin
FC Fakel Voronezh	Sergei Savchenkov
FC Gazovik-Gazprom Izhevsk	Viktor Slesarev
FC Dynamo Stavropol	Pyotr Shubin
FC Zarya Leninsk-Kuznetsky	Sergei Vasyutin
FC Uralan Elista	Pavlo Yakovenko
FC Sokol-PZhD Saratov	Aleksandr Koreshkov (until July); Nikolay Kiselyov (from July)
PFC Spartak Nalchik	Viktor Kumykov
FC Kuban Krasnodar	Vladimir Brazhnikov
FC Saturn Ramenskoye	Vladimir Mukhanov
FC Lokomotiv St. Petersburg	Givi Nodia (until October); Viktor Nikitenko (caretaker, from October)
FC Neftekhimik Nizhnekamsk	Gennadi Sarychev (until July); Viktor Antikhovich (from August)
FC Torpedo Volzhsky	Vladimir Dergach
FC Luch Vladivostok	Ishtvan Sekech (until July); Boris Kolokolov (from August)
FC Druzhba Maykop	Soferbi Yeshugov
FC Lokomotiv Chita	Aleksandr Kovalyov
FC Torpedo Arzamas	Valeri Tikhonov (until July); Valeri Sinau (from August)
FC Okean Nakhodka	Sergei Bondarenko
FC Zvezda Irkutsk	Sergei Muratov
FC Metallurg Krasnoyarsk	Aleksandr Kishinevsky
FC Chkalovets Novosibirsk	Leonid Shevchenko (until September); Vladimir Zaburdayev (from September)

== Standings ==
Pos	Team	Pld	W	D	L	GF	GA	GD	Pts	Promotion or relegation
1	Dynamo-Gazovik Tyumen (P)	42	24	12	6	82	34	+48	84	Promotion to Top League
2	Shinnik Yaroslavl (P)	42	24	11	7	66	32	+34	83	Promotion to Top League
3	Fakel Voronezh (P)	42	23	13	6	72	33	+39	82	Promotion to Top League
4	Gazovik-Gazprom Izhevsk	42	24	7	11	69	44	+25	79	
5	Dynamo Stavropol	42	22	8	12	64	45	+19	74 (Note: FC Dynamo Stavropol awarded one home win)	
6	Zarya Leninsk-Kuznetsky	42	19	9	14	63	54	+9	66	
7	Uralan Elista	42	19	9	14	47	41	+6	66	
8	Sokol-PZhD Saratov	42	18	8	16	56	49	+7	62	
9	Spartak Nalchik	42	17	8	17	62	59	+3	59	
10	Kuban Krasnodar	42	15	14	13	65	60	+5	59	
11	Saturn Ramenskoye	42	16	9	17	48	48	0	57	
12	Lokomotiv St. Petersburg (Note: FC Lokomotiv St. Petersburg was called FC Lokomotiv-Saturn for the first 24-game days of the season.)	42	15	10	17	57	46	+11	55	
13	Neftekhimik Nizhnekamsk	42	15	10	17	45	55	−10	55	
14	Torpedo Volzhsky	42	15	9	18	57	71	−14	54	
15	Luch Vladivostok	42	14	12	16	39	49	−10	54	
16	Druzhba Maykop	42	15	8	19	50	47	+3	53	
17	Lokomotiv Chita	42	13	12	17	50	56	−6	51	
18	Torpedo Arzamas (R)	42	15	5	22	47	64	−17	50	Relegation to Second League
19	Okean Nakhodka (R)	42	10	9	23	42	76	−34	39	Relegation to Second League
20	Zvezda Irkutsk (R)	42	10	8	24	31	63	−32	38	Relegation to Second League
21	Metallurg Krasnoyarsk (R)	42	8	11	23	33	61	−28	35	Relegation to Second League
22	Chkalovets Novosibirsk (R)	42	7	6	29	44	102	−58	27	Relegation to Second League

Source: RSSSF
(P) Promoted; (R) Relegated

== Results ==
Home \ Away	CHK	DRU	DGT	DST	FAK	GGI	KUB	LCH	LSP	LUC	MKR	NEF	OKE	SAT	SHI	SOK	SPN	TAR	TVO	URE	ZAR	ZVE
Chkalovets Novosibirsk		2–0	1–1	0–3	2–4	1–6	0–2	2–2	1–3	1–0	2–0	1–2	0–0	0–1	0–1	2–1	2–3	0–0	4–5	1–2	2–4	2–0
Druzhba Maykop	1–2		1–1	3–1	1–2	0–0	3–0	3–0	0–1	1–1	3–0	3–0	1–0	3–1	1–0	3–0	5–0	2–1	3–1	1–0	1–1	3–0
Dynamo-Gazovik Tyumen	8–0	4–1		0–1	1–1	2–0	6–2	6–3	1–0	3–0	4–2	4–1	1–0	3–0	2–0	1–0	2–1	2–0	3–0	0–0	4–0	2–0
Dynamo Stavropol	2–4	2–0	2–2		3–1	0–1	0–0	2–1	1–0	3–0	2–1	1–0	0–1	4–0	3–2	2–1	2–1	3–1	6–0	3–0	0–0	3–0
Fakel Voronezh	6–0	1–0	1–1	0–0		5–1	2–0	2–0	3–1	0–0	1–0	0–0	6–1	3–0	2–2	0–0	4–1	3–0	2–0	0–0	1–0	1–0
Gazovik-Gazprom	3–1	2–1	3–0	3–0	0–0		2–2	4–1	1–0	3–0	1–0	2–1	5–0	3–0	2–0	2–0	1–0	1–0	1–0	2–0	2–1	1–0
Kuban Krasnodar	1–0	0–1	2–2	2–0	4–0	1–1		0–0	2–0	4–1	4–1	0–0	3–1	2–1	1–1	4–2	2–2	4–2	5–1	0–0	2–2	1–0
Lokomotiv Chita	4–0	3–0	0–0	3–0	1–1	1–1	3–2		1–0	3–1	3–1	3–1	3–1	2–1	0–1	1–4	0–0	2–0	3–1	0–2	0–0	1–0
Lokomotiv St. Petersburg	2–0	1–0	2–1	2–2	1–1	2–2	1–1	0–0		2–2	2–0	0–0	3–1	0–0	0–1	0–2	1–0	2–0	3–2	3–0	9–0	4–1
Luch Vladivostok	1–0	0–0	0–0	2–1	0–0	1–2	3–0	0–0	2–1		1–1	3–0	3–1	1–0	0–1	2–1	3–1	1–1	0–3	1–0	1–1	1–0
Metallurg Krasnoyarsk	1–1	2–0	0–3	1–2	0–3	2–1	0–0	0–0	1–0	1–4		1–0	0–0	0–0	0–1	2–2	1–2	1–3	2–0	3–0	2–1	1–0
Neftekhimik Nizhnekamsk	1–0	2–1	0–1	1–1	1–4	1–3	1–0	2–0	2–2	1–1	3–2		5–1	1–0	2–2	0–0	1–0	2–0	2–1	0–0	2–0	1–0
Okean Nakhodka	4–1	2–0	1–1	0–1	1–2	1–0	1–2	2–2	0–1	0–1	0–0	2–2		1–1	0–3	0–0	0–0	4–0	2–0	2–0	2–1	4–2
Saturn Ramenskoye	3–0	2–0	0–1	1–0	1–1	3–4	2–0	3–0	1–0	3–0	0–0	1–0	3–0		2–1	3–0	2–1	1–0	2–1	1–3	1–1	4–0
Shinnik Yaroslavl	2–0	1–1	1–1	0–0	2–0	2–0	3–1	2–0	2–1	1–0	3–1	4–1	1–0	1–0		3–1	0–0	5–2	1–1	4–0	2–0	3–0
Sokol-PZhD Saratov	4–0	2–0	0–2	4–1	2–1	3–0	3–1	2–0	1–1	2–0	2–0	1–0	1–0	0–0	2–1		3–1	3–0	1–1	1–3	2–1	1–1
Spartak Nalchik	4–4	0–0	4–1	0–1	0–1	2–0	2–5	2–1	3–2	1–0	1–0	2–1	6–3	1–0	1–1	2–1		1–0	5–0	5–0	2–0	4–0
Torpedo Arzamas	3–2	4–1	0–2	2–1	1–2	3–1	1–1	2–1	2–1	2–0	1–0	2–1	0–1	2–1	0–0	1–0	1–0		1–1	1–2	2–1	5–2
Torpedo Volzhsky	3–1	1–0	0–0	1–1	1–2	2–0	2–1	2–1	2–0	1–2	2–1	2–1	5–0	1–1	3–4	2–0	3–0	2–0		0–0	2–1	0–0
Uralan Elista	3–1	0–0	2–0	3–1	1–2	1–1	3–0	1–0	2–0	2–0	0–0	1–2	2–0	2–1	1–0	0–1	3–1	2–1	3–0		0–0	3–0
Zarya Leninsk-Kuznetsky	5–1	1–0	2–1	1–2	2–1	2–0	3–0	0–0	2–1	1–0	3–2	3–0	4–1	5–1	0–0	3–0	2–0	1–0	4–0	1–0		3–2
Zvezda Irkutsk	1–0	3–2	0–2	0–1	1–0	2–1	1–1	2–1	0–2	0–0	0–0	0–1	4–1	0–0	0–1	2–0	0–0	1–0	2–2	1–0	3–0	

Legend: Blue = home team win; Yellow = draw; Red = away team win.

== Top goalscorers ==
Rank	Player	Team	Goals
1	(Georgia (country)) Varlam Kilasonia	Lokomotiv (SPb)	22
2	(Armenia) Karapet Mikaelyan	Sokol-PZhD	20
3	(Russia) Sergei Toporov	Zarya	19
4	(Russia) Nail Galimov	Lokomotiv (Ch)	18
4	(Russia) Sergey Maslov	Dynamo (St)	18
4	(Ukraine) Oleksandr Pryzetko	Dynamo-Gazovik	18
7	(Russia) Vladislav Yarkin	Zarya	17
8	(Russia) Mikhail Zubchuk	Fakel	16
9	(Russia) Valeri Shushlyakov	Kuban	15
9	(Kazakhstan) Valeriy Yablochkin	Shinnik	15

== See also ==
- 1996 Russian Top League
- 1996 Russian Second League
- 1996 Russian Third League
