= Igor Kaleshin =

Igor Kaleshin may refer to:

- Igor Kaleshin (footballer, born 1952), Soviet football player and Russian coach
- Igor Kaleshin (footballer, born 1983), Russian football player
