= Dorofeyev =

Dorofeyev (Russian: Дорофеев) is a Russian surname that is derived from the male given name Dorofey and literally means Dorofey's; spellings include Dorofeev. The female version of the name is Dorofeyeva, found in various spellings including Dorofeeva, Dorofeyeva, Dorofeieiva.

Notable people with this name include:

== Men ==
- Aleksandr Dorofeyev (born 1957), Russian professional football coach
- Artyom Dorofeyev (born 1992), Russian professional ice hockey player
- Dmitry Dorofeyev (born 1976), Russian speed skater
- Igor Dorofeyev (born 1968), Russian ice hockey forward
- Pavel Dorofeyev (born 2000), Russian professional ice hockey player
- Sergei Dorofeyev (born 1986), Russian ice hockey defenceman
- Vasily Dorofeev (born 1990), Russian rugby union player
- Vladimir Dorofeev (1937-2024), Russian politician

== Women ==
- Dorofeeva (born 1990), Ukrainian singer, full name Nadiia Volodymyrivna Dorofieieva
- Ekaterina Ivanova (mountaineer) (1962-1994), née Dorofeeva, Russian mountaineer
- Inna Dorofeieva (born 1965), Ukrainian ballet dancer
- Irina Dorofeeva (born 1977), singer from Belarus
- Nadezhda Dorofeeva, chair from 2015 to 2020 of State Council of the Komi Republic
- Tatiana Dorofeeva (linguist) (1948-2012), Russian linguist
- Valentina Dorofeeva (1937–2018), Soviet industralist
- Vera Vitalyevna Dorofeyeva (born 1960), Russian scholar of Chinese studies
