= Gubanovka =

Gubanovka (Russian: Губановка), rural localities in Russia, may refer to:

- Gubanovka, Kaluga Oblast, a village
- Gubanovka, Kursk Oblast, a village

See also

- Gubanov
