= Murat Gomleshko =

Russian footballer

Personal information
- Full name: Murat Ruslanovich Gomleshko
- Date of birth: 5 January 1970 (age 56)
- Place of birth: Krasnodar, Russian SFSR
- Height: 1.76 m (5 ft 9 1/2 in)
- Positions: Forward; midfielder

Team information
- Current team: FC Kuban-Holding Pavlovskaya (assistant coach)

Youth career
- FC Kuban Krasnodar

Senior career*
| Years | Team | Apps | (Gls) |
| 1989–1990 | FC Kooperator Pavlovskaya | | |
| 1991 | FC Khimik Belorechensk | 40 | (14) |
| 1992–1996 | FC Kuban Krasnodar | 165 | (49) |
| 1992 | → FC Niva Slavyansk-na-Kubani (loan) | 1 | (0) |
| 1996 | → FC Kuban-d Krasnodar | 3 | (1) |
| 1996 | FC Druzhba Maykop | 12 | (0) |
| 1997 | FC Niva Slavyansk-na-Kubani | 26 | (16) |
| 1997–1998 | Kapaz PFK | 9 | (4) |
| 1998 | FC Neftyanik Kubani Goryachy Klyuch | | |
| 1999 | FC Kuban Krasnodar | 14 | (5) |
| 2000–2001 | FC Yelimay Semipalatinsk | 40 | (7) |
| 2001 | FC Aktobe-Lento | 16 | (2) |
| 2002 | FC Nemkom Krasnodar | 2 | (0) |
| 2002 | FC Tikhoretsk | | |
| 2003 | FC Neftyanik Kubani Goryachy Klyuch | | |

Managerial career
- 2006: FC Dynamo Stavropol (assistant)
- 2006: FC Dynamo Stavropol (caretaker)
- 2006: FC Dynamo Stavropol (assistant)
- 2007: FC Dynamo Stavropol (director)
- 2008: FC Dynamo Krasnodar
- 2011–2015: FC Torpedo Armavir (president)
- 2015–2016: FC Kuban Krasnodar (director of sports)
- 2022–2023: FC Kuban-Holding-2 Pavlovskaya
- 2023: FC Kuban-Holding Pavlovskaya (caretaker)
- 2023–: FC Kuban-Holding Pavlovskaya (assistant)
- * Club domestic league appearances and goals

Murat Ruslanovich Gomleshko (Russian: Мурат Русланович Гомлешко; born 5 January 1970) is a Russian professional football coach and a former player who is an assistant coach with FC Kuban-Holding Pavlovskaya.

== Honours ==
- Russian Third League Zone 2 top scorer: 1997 (16 goals).

== Personal life ==
His son Ruslan Gomleshko is a professional footballer.
