= Andrey Davidovich =

Russian footballer (born 1968)

Personal information
- Full name: Andrey Sergeevich Davidovich
- Date of birth: 1 October 1968 (age 58)
- Place of birth: Russia
- Position: Midfielder

Senior career*
Years	Team	Apps	(Gls)
1989–1990	FC Khimik Belorechensk	53	(6)
1990–1991	FC Kuban Krasnodar	35	(7)
1992–1993	FC Kolos Krasnodar	52	(5)
1993–1994	Nea Salamis Famagusta FC	23	(2)
1994–1996	FC Kolos Krasnodar	69	(4)
1996–1997	FC SOYUZ-Gazprom Izhevsk	45	(1)
- * Club domestic league appearances and goals

Andrey Sergeevich Davidovich (Russian: Андрей Давидович; born 1 October 1968) is a Russian former footballer.

== Early life ==
Davidovich was born in 1968 in Krasnodar, Russia. He attended the Institute of Physical Education in Russia.

== Career ==
Davidovich started his career with Russian side FC Khimik Belorechensk. In 1990, he signed for Russian side FC Kuban Krasnodar. In 1992, he signed for Russian side FC Kolos Krasnodar. In 1993, he signed for Cypriot side Nea Salamis Famagusta FC. In 1994, he returned to Russian side FC Kolos Krasnodar. In 1996, he signed for Russian side FC SOYUZ-Gazprom Izhevsk.

== Personal life ==
After retiring from professional football, Davidovich worked as a youth manager. He served in the Russian military.
