= Francisco Arcos =

Spanish football manager

Paco Arcos
Personal information
- Full name: Francisco Arcos Arcos
- Date of birth: 16 December 1974 (age 51)
- Place of birth: Ibi, Spain
- Height: 1.77 m (5 ft 10 in)

Managerial career
- Years: Team
- PM Ibi
- 2009: Luch-Energiya (caretaker)
- 2010: Luch-Energiya (caretaker)
- 2010–2011: Luch-Energiya
- 2011: Alicante (assistant)
- 2012–2014: Rayo Ibense
- 2016: Muro
- 2017–2018: Rayo Ibense

Francisco "Paco" Arcos Arcos (born 16 December 1974) is a Spanish football manager.

== Club career ==
Born in Ibi, Valencian Community, Arcos started his managerial career with Peña Madridista de Ibi. In 2002 he joined CD Torrevieja as a fitness coach, and three years later moved to UD Altea and was assigned the same role.

Arcos moved abroad in 2006, being named in Zoran Vulić's staff at HNK Hajduk Split, as a fitness coach. After the departure of Vulić, he remained with his role under Sergije Krešić and Robert Jarni. He subsequently worked as an assistant fitness coach for the Croatia national team before rejoining Vulić at FC Luch-Energiya Vladivostok in January 2008, again as a fitness coach, on a three-year deal.

On 23 June 2009, Arcos was appointed caretaker manager of Luch, replacing departing Konstantin Yemelyanov and becoming the first Spaniard to manage in the country. On 11 August, despite taking the club to the quarter-finals of the Russian Cup for the first time ever, he returned to his previous role after being replaced by Aleksandr Pobegalov.

In May 2010, Arcos was named manager in the place of sacked Leonid Nazarenko; with the club threatened with relegation, he managed to achieve a mid-table position at the end of the season. The following 27 January, he renewed his contract, but was sacked on 6 May.

On 27 August 2011, Arcos returned to Spain and joined Alicante CF in Tercera División, as a fitness coach, an assistant manager of the main squad and the B-team, in addition to being the coordinator of the club's youth setup. On 3 April of the following year, he was named manager of UD Rayo Ibense in the regional leagues.

On 15 December 2014, despite winning 13 of the first 17 matches of the campaign, Arcos was sacked; it was later revealed that his "political views" (he allegedly was a militant of PSOE) were the main reason for his dismissal.

On 22 June 2016, Arcos took over Muro CF in the fourth division, but was dismissed on 13 October. He returned to Rayo Ibense on 15 June 2017, resigning the following 10 February.
