= Kaplan Khuako =

Russian footballer and coach

Personal information
- Full name: Kaplan Zaurbechevich Khuako
- Date of birth: 17 April 1977 (age 49)
- Place of birth: Maykop, Russian SFSR
- Height: 1.82 m (5 ft 11 1/2 in)
- Position: Defender

Team information
- Current team: FC Druzhba Maykop (general director)

Senior career*
Years	Team	Apps	(Gls)
1994–1999	FC Druzhba Maykop	126	(1)
2000–2003	PFC Spartak Nalchik	114	(1)
2004–2006	FC SKA-Energia Khabarovsk	70	(0)
2007	PFC Spartak Nalchik	1	(0)
2007	FC SKA-Energia Khabarovsk	13	(0)
2008	FC Metallurg Lipetsk	20	(0)
2009	FC Druzhba Maykop	3	(0)

Managerial career
- 2013–2016: FC Druzhba Maykop (administrator)
- 2016: FC Druzhba Maykop (assistant)
- 2017–: FC Druzhba Maykop (general director)
- * Club domestic league appearances and goals

Kaplan Zaurbechevich Khuako (Russian: Каплан Заурбечевич Хуако; born 17 April 1977) is a Russian professional football coach and a former player. He is the general director for FC Druzhba Maykop.

== Club career ==
He made his debut in the Russian Premier League in 2007 for PFC Spartak Nalchik.

== Personal life ==
His sons Tagir Khuako and Temir Khuako are now professional footballers.
