= Aslan Dzhantimirov =

Russian footballer and coach

Personal information
- Full name: Aslan Borisovich Dzhantimirov
- Date of birth: 25 February 1978 (age 48)
- Height: 1.76 m (5 ft 9 1/2 in)
- Position: Midfielder

Senior career*
Years	Team	Apps	(Gls)
1995	FC Urozhay Tulskiy		
1996–1998	FC Druzhba Maykop	33	(1)
1996	→ FC Kommunalnik-Druzhba-d Maykop (loan)	32	(7)
2001–2002	FC Nart Cherkessk	21	(0)

Managerial career
- 2005: FC Dynamo Stavropol (assistant)
- 2005: FC Dynamo Stavropol
- 2006: FC Dynamo Stavropol (assistant)
- * Club domestic league appearances and goals

Aslan Borisovich Dzhantimirov (Russian: Аслан Борисович Джантимиров; born 25 February 1978) is a Russian football coach and a former player.

Dzhantimirov played in the Russian First Division with FC Druzhba Maykop.
