= Gridin =

Gridin (Russian: Гридин) is a Russian masculine surname, its feminine counterpart is Gridina. It may refer to

- Andrey Gridin (born 1988), Kazakhstani-Bulgarian cross-country skier
- Dmitry Gridin (born 1968), Russian serial killer
- Gennady Gridin (born 1961), Russian association football coach and a former player
- Matvei Gridin (born 2006), Russian ice hockey player
- Sergey Gridin (born 1987), Kazakhstani football player
