= Gubanov =

Gubanov (Russian: Губанов) is a Russian masculine surname, its feminine counterpart is Gubanova. The surname originates from the noun guba, which literally means a lip and in a Russian slang refers to a stubborn person. It may refer to

- Anastasiia Gubanova (born 2002), Russian singles figure skater
- Ekaterina Gubanova (born 1979), Russian mezzo-soprano opera singer
- Igor Gubanov (born 1992), Russian football player
- Leonid Gubanov (poet) (1946-1983) - Soviet poet
- Leonid Gubanov (1928-2004), Soviet Russian actor
- Oleg Gubanov (born 1977), Russian football player
