= Igor Cherniy =

Russian footballer and coach

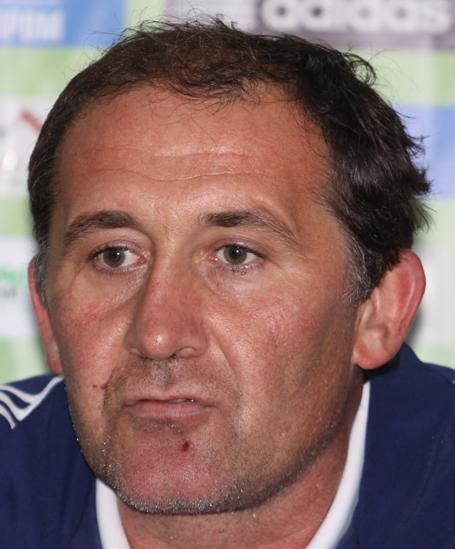

Personal information
- Full name: Igor Vasilyevich Cherniy
- Date of birth: 9 February 1968 (age 58)
- Position: Goalkeeper

Senior career*
Years	Team	Apps	(Gls)
1984–1985	FC Atommash Volgodonsk		
1986	SKA Odessa		
1989	MTsOP Khimik Belorechensk	34	(0)
1990	FC Start Yeysk	1	(0)

Managerial career
- 2007: FC Chernomorets Novorossiysk (assistant)
- 2008: FC Krasnodar-2000 (assistant)
- 2009: FC Krasnodar-2000
- 2009: FC Chernomorets Novorossiysk
- 2009: FC Chernomorets Novorossiysk (assistant)
- 2009: FC Chernomorets Novorossiysk
- 2011–2012: FC Chernomorets Novorossiysk
- 2013: FC Rotor Volgograd (GK coach)
- * Club domestic league appearances and goals

Igor Vasilyevich Cherniy (Russian: Игорь Васильевич Черний; born 9 February 1968) is a Russian professional football coach and a former player.
