= Anzor Ashev =

Russian football player

Personal information
- Full name: Anzor Akhmedovich Ashev
- Date of birth: 28 January 1998 (age 28)
- Place of birth: Khodz, Russia
- Height: 1.70 m (5 ft 7 in)
- Positions: Midfielder; forward

Team information
- Current team: Druzhba Maykop
- Number: 9

Senior career*
Years	Team	Apps	(Gls)
2016–2019	Druzhba Maykop	88	(20)
2019	Armavir	1	(0)
2020	SKA Rostov-on-Don	2	(0)
2020–2021	Druzhba Maykop	24	(7)
2021	Chernomorets Novorossiysk	4	(1)
2021–2023	Druzhba Maykop	50	(10)
2023–2024	Mashuk-KMV	17	(1)
2024	Kolos Belaya Glina		
2025	Kuban-Holding 2		
2025	Samaryanin		
2026–	Druzhba Maykop	22	(7)
- * Club domestic league appearances and goals as of 31 October 2026

Anzor Akhmedovich Ashev (Russian: Анзор Ахмедович Ашев; born 28 January 1998) is a Russian football player who plays for Druzhba Maykop.

== Club career ==
He made his debut in the Russian Professional Football League for Druzhba Maykop on 3 April 2016 in a game against SKA Rostov-on-Don.

He made his Russian Football National League debut for Armavir on 29 July 2019 in a game against Spartak-2 Moscow.
