= Igor Kaleshin (footballer, born 1983) =

Russian footballer

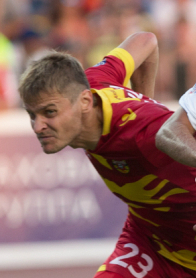

Personal information
- Full name: Igor Sergeyevich Kaleshin
- Date of birth: 29 May 1983 (age 43)
- Place of birth: Maykop, Russian SFSR
- Height: 1.89 m (6 ft 2 in)
- Position: Defender

Senior career*
Years	Team	Apps	(Gls)
2001–2002	FC Druzhba Maykop	67	(0)
2003	FC Lada Togliatti	35	(1)
2004–2006	FC Volgar-Gazprom Astrakhan	68	(2)
2007	FC Gazovik Orenburg	19	(0)
2008–2009	FC Chernomorets Novorossiysk	71	(1)
2010	FC Tyumen	26	(5)
2011	FC Chernomorets Novorossiysk	35	(0)
2012–2013	FC Volgar Astrakhan	26	(1)
2013–2016	FC Arsenal Tula	46	(2)
2017	FC Sochi	7	(0)
- * Club domestic league appearances and goals

Igor Sergeyevich Kaleshin (Russian: Игорь Сергеевич Калешин; born 29 May 1983) is a Russian former professional football player.

== Personal life ==
His uncle Igor and cousins Vitali and Yevgeni are all footballers as well.
