= Andrei Lyakh =

Russian footballer

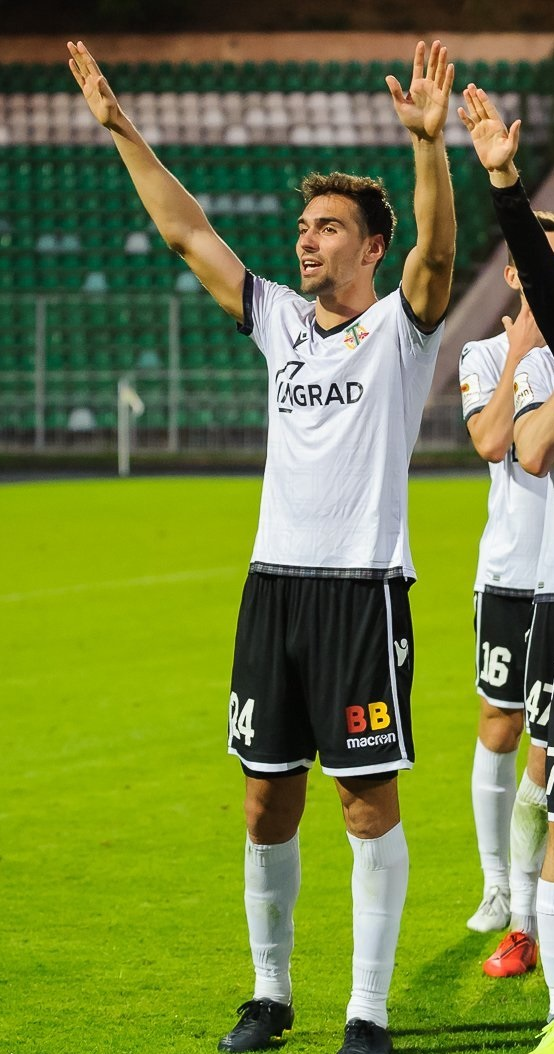
- Lyakh with Torpedo Moscow in 2019

Personal information
- Full name: Andrei Ivanovich Lyakh
- Date of birth: 24 September 1990 (age 36)
- Place of birth: Rostov-on-Don, Russian SFSR
- Height: 1.87 m (6 ft 1 1/2 in)
- Position: Midfielder

Youth career
- 1996–2002: FC Rostov
- 2002–2003: FC Spartak Moscow
- 2004–2008: FC Torpedo Moscow

Senior career*
Years	Team	Apps	(Gls)
2009	FC Torpedo Moscow	0	(0)
2009	FC Khimik Dzerzhinsk	12	(1)
2009	FC Rostov	0	(0)
2010	FK Vėtra	10	(2)
2010	FC Zhemchuzhina-Sochi	1	(0)
2011–2012	FC Spartak Kostroma	35	(5)
2012–2015	FC Arsenal Tula	75	(5)
2015–2016	FC Tom Tomsk	23	(1)
2017	FC Anzhi Makhachkala	0	(0)
2017–2018	FC Shinnik Yaroslavl	23	(0)
2018–2021	FC Torpedo Moscow	67	(3)
2021	FC SKA Rostov-on-Don	15	(3)
2022	FC Chayka Peschanokopskoye	10	(0)
2022–2023	FC Tekstilshchik Ivanovo	25	(4)
2023	FC Spartak Kostroma	6	(0)
2023–2024	FC Ufa	15	(0)
2024	FC Chelyabinsk	8	(0)
2025	FC Lotus Moscow (amateur)		
- * Club domestic league appearances and goals as of 25 August 2026

Andrei Ivanovich Lyakh (Russian: Андрей Иванович Лях; born 24 September 1990) is a Russian former professional football player.

== Club career ==
He made his debut in the Russian Professional Football League for FC Khimik Dzerzhinsk on 29 April 2009 in a game against FC Volga Ulyanovsk. He made his Russian Football National League debut for FC Zhemchuzhina-Sochi on 24 August 2010 in a game against FC Krasnodar. He made his Russian Premier League debut for FC Arsenal Tula on 2 August 2014 in a game against FC Zenit Saint Petersburg.

== Personal life ==
He is a son of Ivan Lyakh and the nephew of Vagiz Khidiyatullin.
