= Nikolai Yuzhanin =

Russian footballer and coach

Personal information
- Full name: Nikolai Nikolayevich Yuzhanin
- Date of birth: 14 October 1963 (age 63)
- Place of birth: Krasnodar, Russian SFSR, Soviet Union
- Position: Defender

Team information
- Current team: Kuban Krasnodar (academy director)

Senior career*
| Years | Team | Apps | (Gls) |
| 1980–1981 | Kuban Krasnodar | 0 | (0) |
| 1984 | Aktyubinets | 26 | (0) |
| 1991 | Khimik Belorechensk | 11 | (1) |

Managerial career
- 1992–1993: Kolos Krasnodar (assistant)
- 1994–1997: Kuban Krasnodar (assistant)
- 1999: Mozdok
- 2001–2003: Krasnodar-2000
- 2003–2004: Kuban Krasnodar
- 2005: Amur Blagoveshchensk
- 2006–2007: Blāzma
- 2008–2009: Chernomorets Novorossiysk
- 2011–2012: Rostov (assistant)
- 2014: Sibir Novosibirsk (assistant)
- 2015–2016: Afips Afipsky
- 2016–2017: Kuban Krasnodar (assistant)
- 2017–2023: Kyrgyzstan U20
- 2024–: Kuban Krasnodar (academy director)
- * Club domestic league appearances and goals

Nikolai Nikolayevich Yuzhanin (Russian: Николай Николаевич Южанин; born 14 October 1963) is a Russian professional football coach and a former player. He is the academy director for Kuban Krasnodar.

== Club career ==
As a player, he made his debut in 1991 the Soviet Second League in for FC Khimik Belorechensk.
