= Vyacheslav Komarov =

Russian footballer and coach

Personal information
- Full name: Vyacheslav Aleksandrovich Komarov
- Date of birth: January 31, 1950 (age 76)
- Position: Forward

Senior career*
Years	Team	Apps	(Gls)
1973	SC Tavriya Simferopol	23	(2)
1976	FC Elbrus Nalchik	0	(0)

Managerial career
- 1997–1999: PFC CSKA Moscow (assistant)
- 1998: PFC CSKA-2 Moscow
- 2000: PFC CSKA-2 Moscow
- 2001–2002: FC Kuban Krasnodar (assistant)
- 2002: FC Kuban Krasnodar
- 2003: FC Tobol (assistant)
- 2003: FC Chernomorets Novorossiysk (assistant)
- 2004: FC Vidnoye
- * Club domestic league appearances and goals

Vyacheslav Aleksandrovich Komarov (Russian: Вячеслав Александрович Комаров; born January 31, 1950) is a Russian professional football coach and a former player.

In 2006, he was involved in a serious car crash, which he barely survived.
