= Mikhail Afonin =

Russian football coach (1957–2025)

Personal information
- Full name: Mikhail Vasilyevich Afonin
- Date of birth: 25 June 1957
- Date of death: 27 July 2025 (aged 68)

Managerial career
- Years: Team
- 2002–2003: FC Krasnodar-2000 (assistant)
- 2003–2004: Kuban Krasnodar (assistant)
- 2005: FC Amur Blagoveshchensk (assistant)
- 2007–2008: FC Krasnodar-2000
- 2009: Nizhny Novgorod
- 2011–2012: Chernomorets Novorossiysk (assistant)
- 2012: Dynamo Moscow (assistant)
- 2015: Kuban Krasnodar (assistant)

Mikhail Vasilyevich Afonin (Russian: Михаил Васильевич Афонин; 25 June 1957 – 27 July 2025) was a Russian professional football coach. He died on 27 July 2025, at the age of 68.
