= Vladimir Brazhnikov =

Russian football manager

Personal information
- Full name: Vladimir Aleksandrovich Brazhnikov
- Date of birth: 11 November 1941
- Place of birth: Mozdok, Russian SFSR
- Date of death: 7 March 2011 (aged 69)
- Place of death: Krasnodar, Russia

Senior career*
Years	Team	Apps	(Gls)
1963–1964	Alga Frunze	18	(1)
1966–1970	Alay		

Managerial career
- 1971–1972: Alay
- 1972–1973: Kolos Oktyabrsky
- 1974–1976: Kuban Krasnodar (assistant)
- 1977: Urozhay Bryukhovetskaya
- 1980: Turbina Naberezhnye Chelny (assistant)
- 1981: Amudarya Nukus (assistant)
- 1982–1983: Amudarya Nukus
- 1984: Amudarya Nukus (assistant)
- 1988–1989: MTsOP-Khimik Belorechensk
- 1989: Kuban Krasnodar
- 1990: Kuban Krasnodar (assistant)
- 1990–1991: Kuban Krasnodar
- 1993–1994: Niva Slavyansk-na-Kubani
- 1994–1995: Kuban Krasnodar
- 1995: Venets Gulkevichi
- 1995–1997: Kuban Krasnodar
- 1997–1998: Kuban Krasnodar (assistant)
- 1999–2001: Kubanochka Krasnodar
- * Club domestic league appearances and goals

Vladimir Aleksandrovich Brazhnikov (Russian: Владимир Александрович Бражников; 11 November 1941 – 7 March 2011) was a Russian professional football player and coach.
