= Igor Kaleshin (footballer, born 1952) =

Russian footballer and coach (1952–2019)

Personal information
- Full name: Igor Viktorovich Kaleshin
- Date of birth: 3 October 1952
- Place of birth: Maykop, Soviet Union
- Date of death: 14 October 2019 (aged 67)
- Height: 1.69 m (5 ft 6 1/2 in)
- Positions: Midfielder; forward

Senior career*
| Years | Team | Apps | (Gls) |
| 1971–1975 | FC Druzhba Maykop | | (19) |
| 1976 | FC Terek Grozny | 14 | (1) |
| 1976 | SKA Kyiv | | (3) |
| 1977 | FC Druzhba Maykop | 40 | (8) |
| 1978 | FC Terek Grozny | 36 | (8) |
| 1979–1985 | FC Kuban Krasnodar | 234 | (51) |

Managerial career
- 1988: FC Kuban Krasnodar (assistant)
- 1988: FC Kuban Krasnodar
- 1989: FC Kuban Krasnodar (assistant)
- 1991–1992: FC Kuban Krasnodar (assistant)
- 1992–1993: FC Kuban Krasnodar
- 1997: FC Kuban-d Krasnodar
- 2003: FC Kuban Krasnodar (assistant)
- * Club domestic league appearances and goals

Igor Viktorovich Kaleshin (Russian: Игорь Викторович Калешин; 3 October 1952 – 14 October 2019) was a Russian professional football coach and a player.

His sons Vitali and Yevgeni Kaleshin and nephew Igor are all professional footballers.
