= Sergei Dorofeyev =

Russian ice hockey player

- Born: 26 August 1986 (age 38); Moscow, Russia
- Height: 6 ft 3 in (191 cm)
- Weight: 209 lb (95 kg; 14 st 13 lb)
- Position: Defence
- Shoots: Right
- KHL team Former teams: Severstal Cherepovets; Krylia Sovetov; HK MVD; Amur Khabarovsk; Metallurg Novokuznetsk
- Playing career: 2003–present

Sergei Dorofeyev (born August 26, 1986) is a Russian professional ice hockey defenceman who is currently playing with Severstal Cherepovets in the Kontinental Hockey League (KHL).
