= Igor Golubtsov =

Russian footballer (born 1955)

Personal information
- Full name: Igor Grigoryevich Golubtsov
- Date of birth: April 13, 1955 (age 71)

Managerial career
- Years: Team
- 1995: FC Lada Togliatti (director)
- 1997–1998: FC Lada-Togliatti-VAZ Togliatti (director)
- 1998: FC Lada-Togliatti-VAZ Togliatti
- 1999: FC Lada Togliatti (president)
- 2000: FC Lada Togliatti (director)
- 2001: FC Lada Togliatti (general director)
- 2002: FC Lada Togliatti (GM)
- 2003: FC Lada Togliatti (director)
- 2004: FC Lada Togliatti (general director)

Igor Grigoryevich Golubtsov (Russian: Игорь Григорьевич Голубцов; born April 13, 1955) is a Russian professional football functionary and coach.

Golubtsov managed FC Lada-Togliatti-VAZ Togliatti in the Russian First Division.
