= Viktor Nikitenko =

Russian footballer and coach

Personal information
- Full name: Viktor Ivanovich Nikitenko
- Date of birth: July 3, 1947 (age 79)
- Height: 1.82 m (6 ft 0 in)
- Position: Midfielder

Managerial career
- Years: Team
- 1993: FC Bulat Cherepovets
- 1994–1999: FC Lokomotiv St. Petersburg (assistant)
- 1996: FC Lokomotiv St. Petersburg (caretaker)
- 2000: FC Lokomotiv St. Petersburg (caretaker)
- 2001: FC Baltika Kaliningrad (assistant)
- 2001: FC Baltika Kaliningrad (caretaker)
- 2002: FC Avtomobilist Noginsk (assistant)
- 2003: FC Pikalyovo (assistant)
- 2005: FC Metallurg Pikalyovo

Viktor Ivanovich Nikitenko (Russian: Виктор Иванович Никитенко; born July 3, 1947) is a Russian professional football coach and a former player.

Nikitenko had multiple spells as caretaker manager of Russian First Division sides FC Lokomotiv St. Petersburg and FC Baltika Kaliningrad.
