= Grigori Mikhalyuk =

Russian football coach (born 1986)

Personal information
- Full name: Grigori Alekseyevich Mikhalyuk
- Date of birth: 9 August 1986 (age 40)
- Place of birth: Leningrad, Soviet Union (now St. Petersburg, Russia)

Team information
- Current team: Zvezda St. Petersburg (assistant manager)

Senior career*
Years	Team	Apps	(Gls)
2005	SDYuShOR Zenit St. Petersburg		
2007	Dynamo St. Petersburg	1	(0)

Managerial career
- 2009–2011: Dynamo St. Petersburg (assistant)
- 2010: Dynamo St. Petersburg (caretaker)
- 2012–2013: Rus St. Petersburg (assistant)
- 2013: Rus St. Petersburg (caretaker)
- 2019–2021: Zvezda St. Petersburg
- 2021–2022: Noah (assistant)
- 2022–2023: Zenit Academy U17
- 2025–: Zvezda St. Petersburg (assistant)
- * Club domestic league appearances and goals

Grigori Alekseyevich Mikhalyuk (Russian: Григорий Алексеевич Михалюк; born 9 August 1986) is a Russian professional football coach and a former player. He is an assistant manager of Zvezda St. Petersburg.

== Coaching career ==
Mikhalyuk was appointed caretaker manager for Russian Football National League side FC Dynamo Saint Petersburg from April to May 2010.

On 24 June 2021, Mikhalyuk was appointed manager of Armenian Premier League team FC Noah.
