= Vladimir Arays =

Russian footballer, coach, and manager

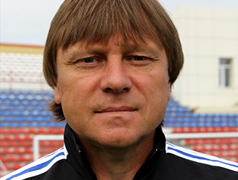

Personal information
- Full name: Vladimir Mikhailovich Arays
- Date of birth: 29 January 1961 (age 65)
- Place of birth: Omsk, Russian SFSR
- Height: 1.79 m (5 ft 10 in)
- Position: Defender

Youth career
- Neftyanik Omsk

Senior career*
Years	Team	Apps	(Gls)
1979–1984	FC Irtysh Omsk	185	(4)
1985	FC Fakel Voronezh	5	(0)
1988–1994	FC Irtysh Omsk	296	(2)
2003	FC Avangard Omsk		

Managerial career
- 1993–1994: FC Irtysh Omsk (assistant)
- 1995: FC Irtysh Omsk
- 2000: FC Spartak Kurgan (assistant)
- 2001–2006: FC Avangard Omsk (assistant)
- 2007: FC Irtysh-1946 Omsk (assistant)
- 2008–2010: FC Irtysh Omsk
- 2012–2014: FC Irtysh Omsk
- 2018–2020: FC Irtysh Omsk
- 2020–2021: FC Irtysh Omsk (assistant)
- 2022: FC Irtysh Omsk
- * Club domestic league appearances and goals

Vladimir Mikhailovich Arays (Russian: Владимир Михайлович Арайс; born 29 January 1961) is a Russian professional football coach and a former player.

== Playing career ==
He made his debut in the Soviet Second League in 1979 for FC Irtysh Omsk.

== Honours ==
=== Individual ===
- Russian Professional Football League Zone East best coach (2018–19).
