= Soferbi Yeshugov =

Russian football coach (born 1956)

Personal information
- Full name: Soferbi Bachmizovich Yeshugov
- Date of birth: 8 February 1956 (age 70)
- Place of birth: Krasnodar, Russian SFSR
- Position: Defender

Youth career
- Kuban Krasnodar

Senior career*
Years	Team	Apps	(Gls)
1974	Kuban Krasnodar	0	(0)
1977–1979	Pakhtachi Gulistan		
1979	Druzhba Maykop	0	(0)
1980	Yangiyer	18	(0)
1980–1982	Druzhba Novotitarovskaya		
1983	Druzhba Maykop	22	(1)
1985	Urozhay Tulsky		

Managerial career
- 1988–1989: Druzhba Maykop (director)
- 1989–1991: Druzhba Maykop
- 1993: Kolos Krasnodar (director)
- 1994–1997: Druzhba Maykop
- 1998: Druzhba Maykop
- 1999–2000: Kuban Krasnodar
- 2001–2003: Spartak Nalchik
- 2004: Kuban Krasnodar (assistant)
- 2004: Kuban Krasnodar
- 2005–2007: Dynamo Bryansk
- 2007: Kuban Krasnodar (assistant)
- 2007: Kuban Krasnodar
- 2008: Metallurg Lipetsk
- 2009: Druzhba Maykop
- 2010: Dynamo Bryansk
- 2011: Jūrmala
- 2013: Khimik Belorechensk
- 2014–2015: Afips Afipsky
- 2017–2018: Dynamo Bryansk
- 2018–2021: Druzhba Maykop
- * Club domestic league appearances and goals

Soferbi Bachmizovich Yeshugov (Russian: Софербий Бачмизович Ешугов, Circassian: Ешыгуау Бацумыжъ и къуэ Софербый; born 8 February 1956) is a Russian professional football coach and a former player.
