= Sergey Feldman =

Russian footballer and manager (born 1964)

Personal information
- Full name: Sergey Yakovlevich Feldman
- Date of birth: 20 April 1964 (age 62)
- Position: Striker

Team information
- Current team: FC Ufa (executive director)

Senior career*
Years	Team	Apps	(Gls)
1986–1988	FC SKA Khabarovsk	51	(5)

Managerial career
- 2005: FC SKA-Energiya Khabarovsk (deputy general director)
- 2006–2016: FC SKA-Energiya Khabarovsk (general director)
- 2010: FC SKA-Energiya Khabarovsk (caretaker)
- 2021: FC Dynamo Bryansk (executive director)
- 2023–: FC Ufa (executive director)
- * Club domestic league appearances and goals

Sergey Yakovlevich Feldman (Russian: Серге́й Я́ковлевич Фе́льдман; born 20 April 1964) is a professional association football functionary from Russia and a former Soviet player. He is the executive director of FC Ufa.

Feldman played in the Soviet First League with SKA Khabarovsk.
