= Adolf Poskotin =

Russian footballer and coach

Personal information
- Full name: Adolf Fyodorovich Poskotin
- Date of birth: 11 July 1937
- Place of birth: Ivanovo, Russian SFSR
- Date of death: 31 January 2015 (aged 77)
- Height: 1.74 m (5 ft 8 1/2 in)
- Position: Defender

Senior career*
Years	Team	Apps	(Gls)
1957–1958	FC Tekstilshchik Ivanovo	46	(1)
1959–1962	Avanhard Simferopol	122	(2)
1963–1966	Avanhard Kharkiv	135	(4)
1967–1968	FC Metalist Kharkiv	45	(1)

Managerial career
- 1973: FC Metalist Kharkiv (assistant)
- 1984: FC Mayak Kharkiv
- 1985: FC Okean Kerch
- 1986: FC Kryvbas Kryvyi Rih
- 1990: FC Kuban Krasnodar (assistant)
- 1991: FC Avtomobilist Sumy (assistant)
- 1993: FC Kolos Krasnodar
- 1997–1998: FC Kuban Krasnodar (assistant)
- 1998: FC Kuban Krasnodar
- 2003: FC Nart Cherkessk (caretaker)
- * Club domestic league appearances and goals

Adolf Fyodorovich Poskotin (Russian: Адольф Фёдорович Поскотин; 11 July 1937, in Ivanovo – 31 January 2015) was a Russian professional football player and coach.
