= Gubanovka, Kursk Oblast =

Rural locality in Kursk Oblast, Russia

Gubanovka Губановка
- Village
- Interactive map of Gubanovka
- Location of Gubanovka Gubanovka (Kursk Oblast)
- Coordinates: 51°27′15″N 36°17′13″E
- Country: Russia
- Federal subject: Kursk Oblast
- Administrative district: Medvensky District
- SelsovietSelsoviet: Kitayevsky

Population (2010 Census)
  - Total: 128
  - Estimate (2010): 128 (0%)

Municipal status
  - Municipal district: Medvensky Municipal District
  - Rural settlement: Kitayevsky Selsoviet Rural Settlement
- Time zone: UTC+3 (MSK)
- Postal code: 307052
- Dialing code: +7 47146
- OKTMO ID: 38624424161
- Website: kitayss.rkursk.ru

Gubanovka (Russian: Губановка) is a rural locality (Russian: деревня, lit. 'village') in Kitayevsky Selsoviet Rural Settlement, Medvensky District, Kursk Oblast, Russia. Population: 128 (2010 census); 150 (2002 census);

== Geography ==
The village is located on the Polnaya River (a left tributary of the Seym), 77 km (48 mi) from the Russia–Ukraine border, 29 km (18 mi) south-east of Kursk, 11 km (6.8 mi) north-east of the district center – the urban-type settlement Medvenka, 4 km (2.5 mi) from the selsoviet center – 2nd Kitayevka.

Climate

Gubanovka has a warm-summer humid continental climate (Dfb in the Köppen climate classification).

Climate data for Gubanovka
Month	Jan	Feb	Mar	Apr	May	Jun	Jul	Aug	Sep	Oct	Nov	Dec	Year
Mean daily maximum °C (°F)	−4.1 (24.6)	−3.1 (26.4)	2.8 (37.0)	13 (55)	19.3 (66.7)	22.6 (72.7)	25.3 (77.5)	24.6 (76.3)	18.2 (64.8)	10.6 (51.1)	3.4 (38.1)	−1.2 (29.8)	11.0 (51.7)
Daily mean °C (°F)	−6.2 (20.8)	−5.7 (21.7)	−0.8 (30.6)	8.2 (46.8)	14.7 (58.5)	18.3 (64.9)	20.9 (69.6)	20 (68)	14 (57)	7.2 (45.0)	1.1 (34.0)	−3.2 (26.2)	7.4 (45.3)
Mean daily minimum °C (°F)	−8.7 (16.3)	−8.9 (16.0)	−4.9 (23.2)	2.6 (36.7)	9 (48)	12.9 (55.2)	15.7 (60.3)	14.8 (58.6)	9.6 (49.3)	3.9 (39.0)	−1.2 (29.8)	−5.3 (22.5)	3.3 (37.9)
Average precipitation mm (inches)	50 (2.0)	43 (1.7)	46 (1.8)	48 (1.9)	60 (2.4)	68 (2.7)	70 (2.8)	54 (2.1)	57 (2.2)	57 (2.2)	45 (1.8)	48 (1.9)	646 (25.5)
Source: https://en.climate-data.org/asia/russian-federation/kursk-oblast/губановка-681737/

== Transport ==
Gubanovka is located 10.5 km (6.5 mi) from the federal route M-2 Crimea Highway (a part of the European route E105), 6.5 km (4.0 mi) from the road of intermunicipal significance 38H-236 (M2 "Crimea Highway" – Polevaya), on the road 38H-237 (M2 "Crimea Highway" – Polny – 38N-236), 22 km (14 mi) from the nearest railway halt Kolodnoye (railway line Klyukva — Belgorod).

The rural locality is situated 33 km (21 mi) from Kursk Vostochny Airport, 92 km (57 mi) from Belgorod International Airport and 207 km (129 mi) from Voronezh Peter the Great Airport.
