= Yuri Bykov (footballer) =

Russian footballer and manager

Personal information
- Full name: Yuri Aleksandrovich Bykov
- Date of birth: 11 January 1963 (age 63)
- Place of birth: Nikolsk, Penza Oblast, Russian SFSR
- Height: 1.75 m (5 ft 9 in)
- Positions: Forward; midfielder

Youth career
- FShM Moscow

Senior career*
Years	Team	Apps	(Gls)
1981	PFC CSKA Moscow	0	(0)
1982–1984	FC Dynamo Bryansk	84	(13)
1985–1986	FC Lokomotiv Moscow	67	(10)
1987	FC Shinnik Yaroslavl	24	(0)
1988	FC Krasnaya Presnya Moscow	8	(0)
1988	FC Sudostroitel Mykolaiv	24	(1)
1989–1991	FC Vulkan Petropavlovsk-Kamchatsky	50	(14)
1993	FC Lada Dimitrovgrad	22	(3)
1994	FC Saturn Ramenskoye	4	(0)
1994	FC Rossiya Moscow	24	(3)
1995	FC Avtomobilist Noginsk	18	(10)
1996	FC Chernomorets Novorossiysk	6	(0)
1996–1998	FC Avtomobilist Noginsk	49	(15)

Managerial career
- 1999–2002: FC Uralan Plus Moscow
- 2003: FC Spartak Lukhovitsy
- 2003: FC Vidnoye (assistant)
- 2003: FC Vidnoye
- 2004: FC Spartak Lukhovitsy
- 2005–2006: FC Spartak Shchyolkovo
- 2007: FC Spartak-MZhK Ryazan
- 2009: FC Shinnik Yaroslavl
- 2010: FC Salyut Belgorod
- 2012–2013: FC Zhemchuzhina-RUDN Sochi
- 2013–2015: FC Biolog-Novokubansk Progress
- 2016–2017: FC Dynamo Bryansk
- * Club domestic league appearances and goals

Yuri Aleksandrovich Bykov (Russian: Юрий Александрович Быков; born 11 January 1963) is a Russian professional football manager and a former player.
