= Valeri Tretyakov =

Russian footballer and coach

Personal information
- Full name: Valeri Mikhailovich Tretyakov
- Date of birth: 16 August 1945 (age 81)
- Place of birth: Lipetsk, Russian SFSR, USSR
- Height: 1.73 m (5 ft 8 in)
- Positions: Midfielder; striker

Youth career
- Torpedo Lipetsk

Senior career*
Years	Team	Apps	(Gls)
1964–1965	Torpedo Lipetsk		
1966–1968	Traktor Volgograd	5	(0)
1968–1969	Energiya Volzhsky	39	(5)
1969	Traktor Volgograd	20	(0)
1970–1973	Metallurg Lipetsk		
1974	Stal Oryol	13	(0)
1974–1975	Novolipetsk Lipetsk	51	(1)

Managerial career
- 1976–1984: Metallurg Lipetsk (academy)
- 1985–1988: Metallurg Lipetsk (assistant)
- 1988–1992: Sokol Lipetsk
- 1993: Spartak Shchyolkovo (director)
- 1994: Spartak Shchyolkovo
- 1994: Svetotekhnika Saransk
- 1995–1997: Metallurg Lipetsk
- 1998: Metallurg Lipetsk (assistant)
- 1998: Metallurg Lipetsk
- 1999: Torpedo-Viktoriya Nizhny Novgorod
- 2000: Arsenal Tula (assistant)
- 2000–2001: Arsenal Tula
- 2001: Metallurg Lipetsk
- 2002–2003: Arsenal Tula
- 2004: Gazovik-Gazprom Izhevsk
- 2005–2006: Spartak Lukhovitsy
- 2006–2008: Yelets
- 2009: Metallurg Lipetsk (director of sports)
- 2009: Metallurg Lipetsk
- * Club domestic league appearances and goals

Valeri Mikhailovich Tretyakov (Russian: Валерий Михайлович Третьяков; born 16 August 1945) is a Russian professional football coach and a former player.
