= Zurab Sanaya =

Russian footballer (born 1968)

Personal information
- Full name: Zurab Vladimirovich Sanaya
- Date of birth: 15 April 1968 (age 58)
- Place of birth: Stavropol, Russian SFSR
- Height: 1.84 m (6 ft 1/2 in)
- Position: Goalkeeper

Youth career
- ShISP Stavropol
- Mashuk Pyatigorsk

Senior career*
Years	Team	Apps	(Gls)
1985–1986	Nart Cherkessk	10	(0)
1988–1991	Mashuk Pyatigorsk	122	(0)
1992	Asmaral Kislovodsk	14	(0)
1992–1994	Dynamo Stavropol	37	(0)
1995–1997	Paniliakos	11	(0)
1998–1999	Baltika Kaliningrad	35	(0)
2000	Sokol Saratov	0	(0)
2001	Fakel Voronezh	11	(0)
2002–2003	Metallurg Lipetsk	35	(0)

Managerial career
- 2005–2006: Baltika Kaliningrad (assistant)
- 2007: Luch-Energiya Vladivostok (assistant)
- 2008–2009: Baltika Kaliningrad
- 2010: Zhemchuzhina-Sochi (director of sports)
- 2010: Zhemchuzhina-Sochi
- 2010: Zhemchuzhina-Sochi (director of sports)
- 2011: Zhemchuzhina-Sochi (assistant)
- 2013: Akzhayik (conditioning)
- 2016: Mashuk-KMV Pyatigorsk
- 2022: Rotor Volgograd (GK coach)
- * Club domestic league appearances and goals

Zurab Vladimirovich Sanaya (Russian: Зураб Владимирович Саная; born 15 April 1968) is a Russian professional football coach and a former player.

As a player, he made his debut in the Soviet Second League in 1985 for FC Nart Cherkessk.

His son Anzor Sanaya is a professional footballer.
