= FC Spartak Shchyolkovo =

Defunct association football club in Russia

- Full name: Football Club Spartak Shchyolkovo
- Founded: 1992
- Dissolved: 2009
- Ground: Spartak Stadium
- League: Russian Second Division, Zone West
- 2009: 19th

FC Spartak Shchyolkovo (Russian: ФК Спартак Щёлково) is a Russian football club from Shchyolkovo, founded in 1992. It first played on the professional level in 1993. It came second in the division twice, just missing the promotion into the Russian First Division, in 1998 and 1999. In 2009, it was playing in the Russian Second Division, but on July 17 the team resigned from the Division (due to financial strait) after playing 18 games.
