= Ivan Lyakh =

Russian footballer

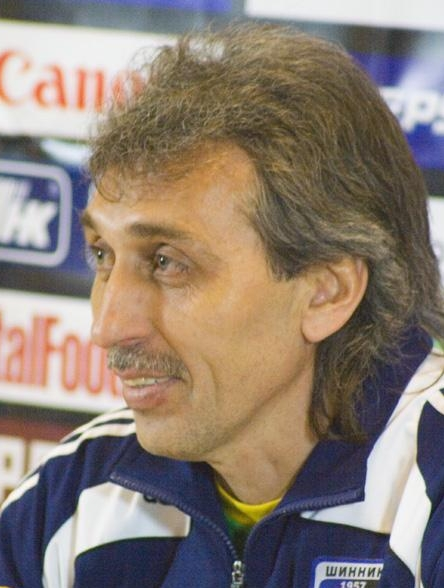
- Liakh in 2008

Personal information
- Full name: Ivan Vasilyevich Lyakh
- Date of birth: 14 January 1960 (age 66)
- Place of birth: Rodniki, Rostov Oblast, Russian SFSR
- Height: 1.76 m (5 ft 9 1/2 in)
- Positions: Defender; midfielder

Senior career*
Years	Team	Apps	(Gls)
1981	FC Torpedo Togliatti		
1981–1983	FC Tekstilshchik Ivanovo	78	(11)
1984–1987	FC Rostselmash Rostov-on-Don	125	(8)
1988	FC Tekstilshchik Ivanovo	35	(4)
1989–1990	FC Torpedo Taganrog	52	(0)
1991	FC Shakhtyor Shakhty	11	(0)
1993	FC Istochnik Rostov-on-Don	22	(3)

Managerial career
- 1994–1995: FC Istochnik Rostov-on-Don (assistant)
- 1996: FC Istochnik Rostov-on-Don
- 2000: FC Rostselmash-2 Rostov-on-Don
- 2001: FC Rostselmash Rostov-on-Don (assistant)
- 2004: FC Dynamo Stavropol (assistant)
- 2005: FC Rostov (assistant)
- 2006: FC Spartak Nizhny Novgorod (assistant)
- 2007–2009: FC Shinnik Yaroslavl (assistant)
- 2008: FC Shinnik Yaroslavl (caretaker)
- 2009: FC Shinnik Yaroslavl
- 2010: FC Baltika Kaliningrad
- 2014–2015: FC Rostov (reserves)
- * Club domestic league appearances and goals

Ivan Vasilyevich Lyakh (Russian: Иван Васильевич Лях; born 14 January 1960) is a Russian professional football coach and a former player.

He is the father of Andrei Lyakh.
