= Valeri Sinau =

Russian footballer (1944–2023)

Personal information
- Full name: Valeri Nikolayevich Sinau
- Date of birth: 10 September 1944
- Place of birth: RSFSR, USSR
- Date of death: 18 March 2023 (aged 78)
- Place of death: Rostov-on-Don, Russia
- Height: 1.72 m (5 ft 8 in)
- Position: Defender

Youth career
- Trudovyye Rezervy Rostov-on-Don

Senior career*
Years	Team	Apps	(Gls)
1962	Torpedo Armavir	14	(0)
1963–1964	Rostselmash Rostov-on-Don	32	(0)
1964–1966	SKA Rostov-on-Don	0	(0)
1967–1968	Zorya Luhansk	36	(0)
1969	SKA Rostov-on-Don	27	(0)
1970	Mashuk Pyatigorsk	5	(0)
1971	Avtomobilist Nalchik	11	(0)
1972	Lokomotiv Moscow	0	(0)
1972–1973	Lokomotyv Vinnytsia	22	(0)
1974–1975	Rostselmash Rostov-on-Don		

Managerial career
- 1978–1979: Spartak Oryol
- 1980–1981: Torpedo Tolyatti
- 1982–1984: Rostselmash Rostov-on-Don (director)
- 1985–1990: Rostselmash Rostov-on-Don
- 1991: APK Azov
- 1992: Lokomotiv-Eretisport NN (assistant)
- 1994–1995: SKA Rostov-on-Don
- 1996–1997: Torpedo Arzamas
- 1997–1998: Kuban Krasnodar
- 1999: Lokomotiv Nizhny Novgorod (assistant)
- 2001: Lokomotiv Nizhny Novgorod
- 2004: Alan Rostov-on-Don
- 2005: Alternativa Rostov-on-Don
- 2007: Nika Krasny Sulin
- 2010–2011: Dongazdobycha Krasny Sulin (general director)
- * Club domestic league appearances and goals

Valeri Nikolayevich Sinau (Russian: Валерий Николаевич Синау; 10 September 1944 – 18 March 2023) was a Russian professional football coach and a player.

Sinau died in Rostov-on-Don on 18 March 2023, at the age of 78.
