= Pyotr Shubin =

Russian footballer (born 1944)

Personal information
- Full name: Pyotr Yevgenyevich Shubin
- Date of birth: 21 February 1944 (age 82)
- Place of birth: Chelyabinsk, Russian SFSR, Soviet Union
- Height: 1.78 m (5 ft 10 in)
- Positions: Midfielder; forward

Youth career
- Lokomotiv Chelyabinsk

Senior career*
| Years | Team | Apps | (Gls) |
| 1962 | Lokomotiv Chelyabinsk | | |
| 1963–1964 | Lokomotiv Orenburg | | |
| 1964–1967 | Alga Frunze | | |
| 1968 | Lokomotiv Chelyabinsk | 37 | (12) |
| 1969 | Uralmash Sverdlovsk | 23 | (2) |
| 1970–1973 | Alga Frunze | 98 | (12) |

Managerial career
- 1974–1975: Alga Frunze (assistant)
- 1976: Alga Frunze
- 1978: Kirghiz SSR
- 1979–1980: Dinamo Samarqand (assistant)
- 1981: Dinamo Samarqand
- 1982: SKA Rostov-on-Don (assistant)
- 1983–1984: SKA Rostov-on-Don
- 1985–1988: Spartak Moscow (assistant)
- 1989: Rotor Volgograd
- 1990–1991: Sidi Bel Abbès
- 1991–1992: Ras Al Khaimah (academy director)
- 1993–1995: Ras Al Khaimah
- 1996: Dynamo Stavropol
- 1997–1998: Shinnik Yaroslavl
- 1998: Anzhi Makhachkala
- 1999: Ras Al Khaimah (consultant)
- 2000–2001: KAMAZ Naberezhnye Chelny
- 2003: DYuSSh Futbolnoye Delo Moscow
- 2004: Dinamo Minsk
- 2004–2006: Spartak Moscow (academy)
- 2006–2008: Spartak Moscow (academy director)
- * Club domestic league appearances and goals

Pyotr Yevgenyevich Shubin (Russian: Пётр Евгеньевич Шубин; born 21 February 1944) is a Russian professional football coach and a former player.

== Career ==
Shubin managed SKA Rostov-on-Donin the Soviet Top League and Soviet First League and Dynamo Stavropol in the Russian First League before being appointed to replace the gravely ill Anatoli Polosin at Russian Top League club Shinnik Yaroslavl in August 1997.
