= Aleksandr Dorofeyev =

Russian footballer and coach

Personal information
- Full name: Aleksandr Nikolayevich Dorofeyev
- Date of birth: June 3, 1957 (age 69)
- Position: Defender

Senior career*
Years	Team	Apps	(Gls)
1981	FC Dynamo Barnaul		
1988–1989	FC Progress Biysk	50	(1)
1992	FC Dynamo Barnaul	24	(0)
1993	FC Sakhalin Kholmsk	19	(0)

Managerial career
- 1995: FC Sakhalin Kholmsk (assistant)
- 1996: FC Dynamo Barnaul (assistant)
- 1999: FC Dynamo Barnaul (assistant)
- 2001–2002: FC Chkalovets-1936 Novosibirsk (assistant)
- 2004–2005: FC Dynamo Barnaul (assistant)
- 2006–2008: FC Dynamo Barnaul
- 2009–2010: FC Dynamo Kirov (assistant)
- 2010–2011: FC Irtysh Omsk
- 2011–2012: FC Irtysh Omsk
- * Club domestic league appearances and goals

Aleksandr Nikolayevich Dorofeyev (Russian: Александр Николаевич Дорофеев; born June 3, 1957) is a Russian professional football coach and a former player currently managing FC Irtysh Omsk in the Russian Second Division.

Dorofeyev played in the Russian First League with FC Dynamo Barnaul and FC Sakhalin Kholmsk.
