= Sergei Pavlov (football manager) =

Russian professional football coach (born 1955)

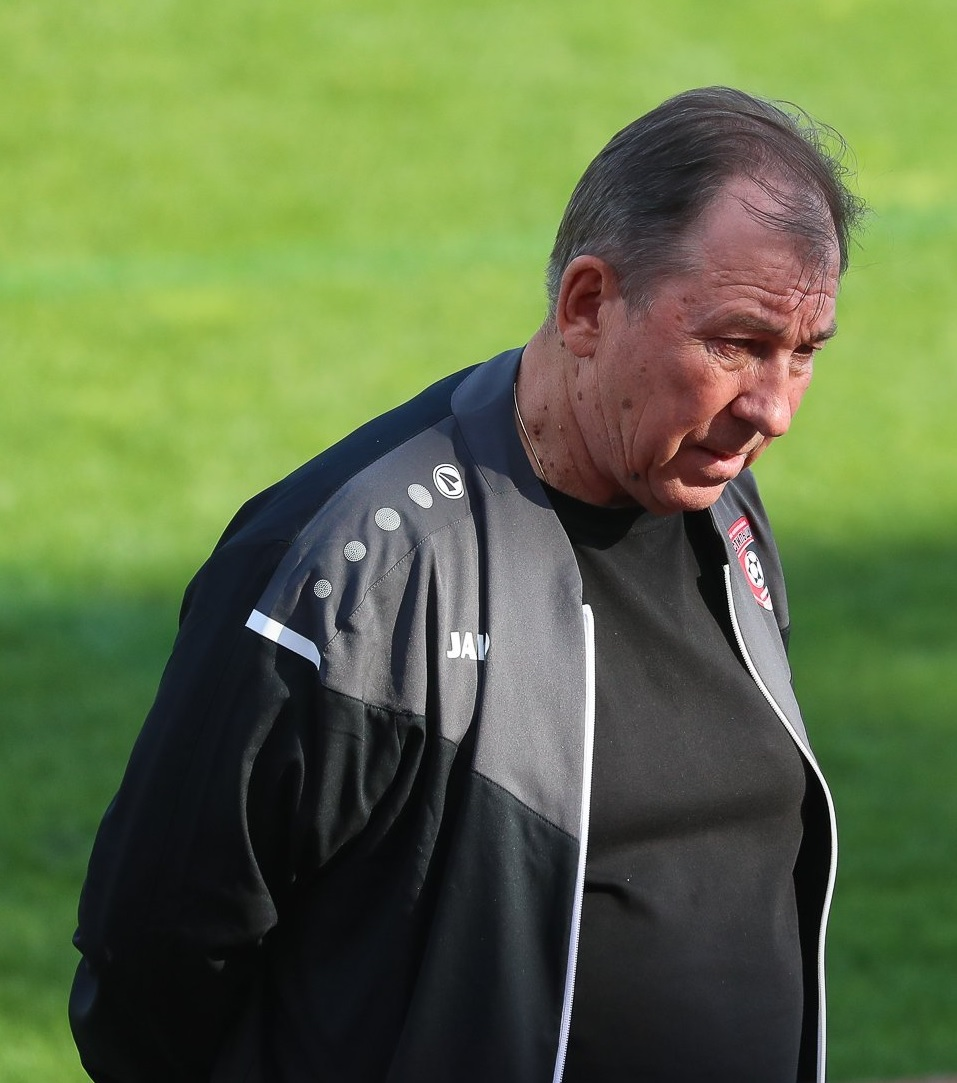
- Pavlov coaching Tekstilshchik Ivanovo in 2021

Personal information
- Full name: Sergei Aleksandrovich Pavlov
- Date of birth: 16 September 1955 (age 71)
- Place of birth: Kamyshin, Russian SFSR

Managerial career
- Years: Team
- 1979–1997: Tekstilshchik Kamyshin
- 1994–1996: Russia (assistant)
- 1998–2000: Saturn Ramenskoye
- 1999–2002: Russia (assistant)
- 2000: Saturn Ramenskoye (president)
- 2000–2002: Uralan Elista
- 2002–2003: Spartak Moscow (assistant)
- 2003: Chernomorets Novorossiysk
- 2003–2004: Saturn Ramenskoye (assistant)
- 2004–2007: Luch-Energiya Vladivostok
- 2008: Kuban Krasnodar
- 2008–2009: Shinnik Yaroslavl
- 2010: Torpedo Moscow
- 2011–2012: Luch-Energiya Vladivostok
- 2014–2015: Saturn Ramenskoye
- 2016: Arsenal Tula
- 2017: Atyrau
- 2017–2018: Rotor Volgograd
- 2019–2021: Tekstilshchik Ivanovo
- 2023–2024: Volgar Astrakhan

Sergei Aleksandrovich Pavlov (Russian: Сергей Александрович Павлов; born 16 September 1955) is a Russian professional football coach.

== Career ==
=== Managerial ===
In April 2017, Pavlov was appointed as manager of FC Atyrau following the resignation of Zoran Vulić. Pavlov himself then resigned on 21 September 2017.

== Honours ==
- Russian First Division best manager: 2005.
