= Oleg Gubanov =

Russian footballer

Personal information
- Full name: Oleg Anatolyevich Gubanov
- Date of birth: 7 June 1977 (age 49)
- Place of birth: Volgograd, Russian SFSR
- Height: 1.78 m (5 ft 10 in)
- Positions: Midfielder; forward

Senior career*
Years	Team	Apps	(Gls)
1997	FC Rotor-d Volgograd	25	(1)
1998	FC Rotor Kamyshin	14	(1)
1998	FC Torpedo Volzhsky	12	(2)
1999	FC Rotor-2 Volgograd	15	(1)
1999	FC Torpedo Volzhsky	14	(4)
2000–2005	FC Mordovia Saransk	197	(23)
2006	FC Lada Togliatti	17	(0)
2006	FC Energetik Uren	8	(0)
2007	FC Volga Ulyanovsk	24	(1)
2008–2009	FC Nizhny Novgorod	43	(4)
2009	FC Mordovia Saransk	9	(0)
2010	FC Zvezda Ryazan	25	(2)
- * Club domestic league appearances and goals

Oleg Anatolyevich Gubanov (Russian: Олег Анатольевич Губанов; born 7 June 1977) is a former Russian professional football player.

== Club career ==
He played 4 seasons in the Russian Football National League for FC Mordovia Saransk, FC Lada Togliatti and FC Nizhny Novgorod.
