= Viktor Zaidenberg =

Russian football coach (1949–2026)

Personal information
- Full name: Viktor Lazarevich Zaidenberg
- Date of birth: 22 June 1946
- Date of death: 19 April 2026 (aged 79)

Managerial career
- Years: Team
- 2003–2004: FC Dynamo Kirov
- 2008: FC Khimik Dzerzhinsk
- 2009–2010: Nizhny Novgorod

Viktor Lazarevich Zaidenberg (Russian: Виктор Лазаревич Зайденберг; 22 June 1946 – 19 April 2026) was a Russian professional football coach. He managed Nizhny Novgorod in the Russian National Football League. Zaidenberg died on 19 April 2026, at the age of 79.
