= Gennady Gridin =

Russian footballer

Personal information
- Full name: Gennady Grigoryevich Gridin
- Date of birth: 19 March 1961 (age 65)
- Place of birth: Stavropol, Russian SFSR
- Position: Defender

Senior career*
Years	Team	Apps	(Gls)
1980–1981	Dynamo Stavropol		
1984	Nart Cherkessk	2	(0)
1984	Kolos Krasnogvardeyskoye (amateur)		
1988–1989	Signal Izobilny	54	(1)
1990	Sherstyanik Nevinnomyssk (amateur)		
1991	Kolos Krasnogvardeyskoye (amateur)		
1992	Iskra Novoaleksandrovsk	7	(0)
1992–1993	Polonia Bytom	0	(0)

Managerial career
- 1998: Kolos Krasnogvardeyskoye
- 2001: Spartak-Kavkaztransgaz Izobilny (VP)
- 2002: Spartak-Kavkaztransgaz Izobilny (general director)
- 2003: Nosta Novotroitsk (sporting director)
- 2003: Chernomorets-d Novorossiysk
- 2004: Dynamo Makhachkala (director)
- 2005–2006: Dynamo Makhachkala
- 2006: Spartak Nizhny Novgorod
- 2007: Sodovik Sterlitamak
- 2008: Dynamo Stavropol
- 2008: Torpedo Moscow (sporting director)
- 2009: Stavropolye-2009 (general director)
- 2009: Nosta Novotroitsk
- 2010–2012: Dynamo Stavropol
- 2013: Khimki
- 2015–2016: Gvardiya Krasnogvardeyskoye
- 2016–2017: Mordovia Saransk (assistant)
- * Club domestic league appearances and goals

Gennady Grigoryevich Gridin (Russian: Генна́дий Григо́рьевич Гри́дин; born 19 March 1961) is a Russian professional football coach and a former player.
