= Valeri Shushlyakov =

Russian footballer

Personal information
- Full name: Valeri Vitalyevich Shushlyakov
- Date of birth: 13 July 1966 (age 60)
- Place of birth: Oryol, Russian SFSR
- Height: 1.76 m (5 ft 9 1/2 in)
- Positions: Forward; midfielder

Youth career
- DYuSSh-3 Oryol

Senior career*
Years	Team	Apps	(Gls)
1982–1984	FC Spartak Oryol	36	(2)
1987–1988	FC Aktyubinets	43	(8)
1989–1990	Navbahor Namangan	78	(34)
1991–1992	FC Uralmash Yekaterinburg	67	(25)
1992–1993	Szegedi EAC	13	(4)
1993	FC Uralmash Yekaterinburg	11	(0)
1994–1996	FC Baltika Kaliningrad	86	(23)
1996–1997	FC Kuban Krasnodar	59	(30)
1998–1999	FC Kristall Smolensk	74	(25)
2000–2001	FC Volgar-Gazprom Astrakhan	70	(10)
2002–2003	FC Oryol	40	(16)
2003	FC LUKoil Chelyabinsk	4	(0)
2007	FC Zolotoy Oryol Oryol		
- * Club domestic league appearances and goals

Valeri Vitalyevich Shushlyakov (Russian: Валерий Витальевич Шушляков; born 13 July 1966 in Oryol) is a former Russian football player.
