= Leonid Nazarenko =

Russian footballer

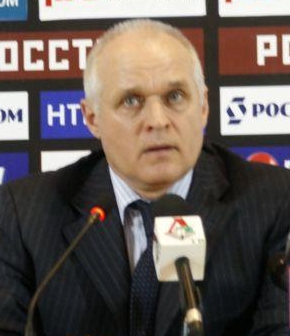

Personal information
- Full name: Leonid Vasilyevich Nazarenko
- Date of birth: 21 March 1955 (age 71)
- Place of birth: Kuban, Krasnodar Krai, Russian SFSR
- Height: 1.76 m (5 ft 9 in)
- Position: Forward

Youth career
- ROSHiSP-10 Rostov-on-Don

Senior career*
Years	Team	Apps	(Gls)
1973–1975	SKA Rostov-on-Don	55	(9)
1976–1980	CSKA Moscow	75	(15)
Total		130	(24)

International career
1976	USSR	8	(2)

Managerial career
- 1984–1987: SKA Khabarovsk
- 1988: CSKA Moscow (assistant)
- 1989–1992: CSKA-2 Moscow
- 1993–1994: Kuban Krasnodar
- 1995–1997: MChS-Selyatino Selyatino
- 1998–1999: Torpedo-Viktoriya Nizhny Novgorod
- 2000: CSKA Moscow (assistant)
- 2001: Irtysh Pavlodar
- 2002–2003: Dynamo Makhachkala
- 2004: Dynamo Makhachkala (sporting director)
- 2004: Kuban Krasnodar
- 2005: Kuban Krasnodar (assistant)
- 2006: Spartak-MZhK Ryazan
- 2006: Dynamo Makhachkala
- 2007: Kuban Krasnodar
- 2007: Kuban Krasnodar (assistant)
- 2007: Kuban Krasnodar
- 2007–2008: Terek Grozny
- 2008–2009: Dynamo Bryansk
- 2009: Irtysh Pavlodar
- 2009–2010: Luch-Energiya Vladivostok
- 2011: Daugava
- 2015–2023: Biolog-Novokubansk
Medal record
Representing Soviet Union
Men's Football
Bronze medal – third place	1976 Montreal	Team competition
- * Club domestic league appearances and goals

Leonid Vasilyevich Nazarenko (Russian: Леонид Васильевич Назаренко; born 21 March 1955) is a Russian football coach and a former player.

== Honours ==
- Olympic bronze: 1976.

== International career ==
Nazarenko made his debut for USSR on 10 March 1976 in a friendly against Czechoslovakia. He played in the quarterfinal of UEFA Euro 1976 (USSR did not qualify for the final tournament).
