= Aleksandr Pobegalov =

Russian professional football coach (born 1956)

Personal information
- Full name: Aleksandr Mikhailovich Pobegalov
- Date of birth: 8 April 1956 (age 70)
- Place of birth: Yaroslavl, Russian SFSR

Managerial career
- Years: Team
- 1985–1991: SDYuSShOR Yaroslavets Yaroslavl
- 1992–2000: Shinnik Yaroslavl (assistant)
- 1999: Shinnik Yaroslavl (caretaker)
- 1999: Shinnik Yaroslavl (caretaker)
- 2000–2004: Shinnik Yaroslavl
- 2005–2009: Ural Yekaterinburg
- 2009: Luch-Energiya Vladivostok
- 2010: Volga Nizhny Novgorod
- 2010–2011: Shinnik Yaroslavl
- 2012: Ural Yekaterinburg
- 2012–2020: Shinnik Yaroslavl
- 2024–2025: Shinnik Yaroslavl

Aleksandr Mikhailovich Pobegalov (Russian: Александр Михайлович Побегалов; born 8 April 1956) is a Russian professional football coach.
