= FC Kuban Krasnodar =

Kuban
- Full name: Футбольный клуб Кубань Краснодар (Football Club Kuban Krasnodar)
- Nicknames: Kazaki (The Cossacks); Zhelto-zeleniye (The Yellow-Greens); Zhaby (The Toads)
- Founded: 1928; 98 years ago
- Dissolved: 2018; 8 years ago (continues to play locally)
- Ground: Kuban Stadium, Krasnodar
- Capacity: 35,200
- 2017–18: FNL, 9th
Home colours	Away colours

FC Kuban (Russian: Футбольный клуб "Кубань" Краснодар) was a Russian professional football club based in Krasnodar, which now only plays on a regional level. The team began playing in the Russian Premier League in 2011, having for won the Russian First Division a year prior. By then, it was one of the oldest professional football clubs in the country, with its foundation being linked to the Soviet NKVD as Dynamo Krasnodar. It changed its name at a time of political change in the USSR.

Club members and fans were called "Kubantsy" (Russian: Кубанцы) (because of its location) or "yellow-greens" (the club colours). The team was also known as the "Cossacks" by fans. Other nicknames associated with the club colours were "The Canaries" (analogous to the similar colours of the French side Nantes and the English club Norwich City) and "The Toads" (primarily by opponents and the Kuban Ultras).

On 17 May 2018 it was announced that FC Kuban had dissolved because of bankruptcy. It was resurrected by fans and former footballers on a local level a few months later and the team played its first official match in the Krasnodar Krai Regional League. The club is not officially linked to the new PFC Kuban Krasnodar, which is often seen to be the successor to the club on a professional level.

== Chronology of club names ==
- Dynamo (1928–53)
- Neftyanik (1954–57)
- Kuban (1958–60)
- Spartak (1960–62)
- Kuban (1963–2018)

== History ==
=== Origins ===
Football first appeared in Kuban during the early 20th century, when a number of sports clubs were created in Ekaterinodar. The first matches were intra-club, and football competed with other sports; however, interest gradually grew and friendly matches were played between clubs in different cities. The first intercity football match was played in Ekaterinodar on 6 August (or 9 August) 1912 when the Achilles club (or an Ekaterinodar city team with Achilles players) defeated Novorossiysk Olympia 5–0. Since 1913, when the first city championship was played, matches between city teams (Achilles, Sport and Victoria) have become common.

=== Founding ===
According to the club, its history began in 1928 with the organization in Krasnodar of Dynamo NKVD. According to some reports the team was founded a year earlier, but documentary evidence of that club does not exist. The team came into existence in 1928, according to documents in the archives.

=== Dynamo: 1928–1953 ===
Before there was a national championship, Dynamo played friendly matches with the best teams in Russia, Ukraine and the Caucasus. In addition to these matches, tournaments were played in the city (including the Lottery Friendship Cup, played by sports clubs and teams from the Krasnodar military garrison).

In 1931 Dynamo moved into its own stadium, in the center of Krasnodar, which is now the city's oldest existing sports facility. That year, the club received the Sportspeople of the Northern Caucasus award.

In 1935, Dynamo (the only Krasnodar team) played in the intercity USSR Championship. In the group stage in Pyatigorsk, the team played three games in five days. On 26 June, they played to a 2–2 draw with Yerevan, and on 28 June Dynamo won 1–0 over Makhachkala. On 30 June the club lost to Pyatigorsk 1–2, finishing third in the group.

In 1948 the club played in the RSFSR championship, beginning with preliminary games in the North Caucasus (against teams from Stavropol, Rostov-on-Don, Grozny, Stalingrad, Nalchik, Makhachkala and the Krasnodar Lightning. Dynamo was undefeated in the zone tournament. The playoffs began on 3 October at the Dynamo stadium, where the hosts reached the finals undefeated. On 17 October 1948 Dynamo beat Molotov 4–0 in the final and became, for the first time in their history, RSFSR champions (winning a number of prizes).

=== Neftyanik: 1954–1957 ===
In 1953 Dynamo changed its name to Neftyanik, representing Krasnodar in the Class B Soviet League the following year. The team played well in the first round of the 1953 championship but faltered in the second, eventually finishing 10th.

In the 1955 season, Neftyanik finished in fifth place and was promoted to Class A of the Soviet Top League. The following year, the club finished fourth. In the 1957 season Neftyanik again finished fourth.

=== Kuban: 1958–1960 ===
In 1958 the team again changed its name, this time to Kuban. It was in the top echelon for most of the 1958–59 season despite the loss of eight players (the team's core) to the army, where most represented FC SKVO. In the 1959–60 season, Kuban finished in fifth place.

=== Spartak: 1960–1962 ===
When the team moved to Spartak during the second half of the 1960 season, they finished third. The following year they finished eighth, which was blamed by fans on poor coaching.

After the first round of the 1962 championship, Spartak was in sixth place. Between rounds, a new manager (Vladimir Gorokhov, a Master of Sport in the USSR) was brought in. In the second round Spartak, unhampered by injuries, won their zonal tournament.

The final round involved the five best clubs in Krasnodar Krai. Spartak played four matches, winning three. They defeated Voronezh Trud (1–0), Army Novosibirsk (2–0) and Yaroslavl Shinnik (2–0), drawing (2–2) with Sverdlovsk Uralmash in the third match. As RSFSR zone champion, Spartak won the right to play in the Soviet Top League; however, because of a league reorganization they were not permitted to play.

=== Kuban: 1963–1979 ===
In 1963, after the club changed its name back to Kuban, they played unevenly and finished 10th in the Group 2 of Class A. After two poor seasons in 1964 and 1965 (where they finished 15th and 25th, respectively) three good seasons followed in 1966, 1967 and 1969. However, despite finishing third each season the team did not win promotion. In 1970 Kuban were relegated to the Soviet Second League, and its ownership changed the following year.

In 1973, Kuban finished third in the final tournament, earning a return to the First League and winning their third RSFSR zone championship. The club struggled in the First League for two seasons until they were relegated again to the Second League in 1976. Kuban returned to the First League in 1977. After a good start in 1978 (immediately after their promotion), Kuban eventually finished in sixth place.

The 1979 season was one of the most successful ones in recent club history. Kuban finished second, earning the right to play in the following year's Top League. Unlike 1962, there was no reorganization of the Soviet League and Kuban was promoted.

=== 1980–1991 ===
In 1980, Kuban played for the first time in the Soviet Top League. Before the season, the Kuban Stadium was renovated with an increase in capacity. Their first home game was a scoreless tie on 7 April with Lokomotiv Moscow, and on 12 April Kuban scored their first Top League goals against Dynamo Tbilisi (2–2). At the end of the season Kuban won the "Together with the team" prize for home-field attendance. In 1981 the team finished in 13th place, the club's greatest achievement to date.

Although the 1982 season began well, with the club in sixth place, at the end of the season they were relegated from the Soviet Top League. In 1983 Kuban played unevenly, defeating the leading clubs but losing points to lesser teams. They finished the season in eighth place.

Kuban finished fourth in 1984; in September, they were in the hunt for a top-two finish (and promotion to the Soviet Top League before losing their final game. The next two seasons were poor, with the team (in 18th place) narrowly avoiding relegation from the First League in 1985 and relegated in 1986 with a 20th-place finish.

In 1987, Kuban was promoted back to the First League. In November the team won its fourth RSFSR championship, a record for a non-capital-city club. During the next four seasons (1988, 1989, 1990 and 1991), Kuban finished 19th three consecutive times and second-last (21st place) in its final USSR First League season.

=== 1992–1999 ===
In 1992, because of the disintegration of the USSR and the collapse of the Soviet leagues, Kuban played in the new Top Division league; however, they were overmatched and were relegated to the First Division. The 1993 season saw a new head coach: international Master of Sports Leonid Nazarenko. Until mid-May, Kuban was among the group leaders before finishing the season in 15th place.

Although the team was expected to return to the Top Division in 1994 (standing in second place early in the season), Kuban finished in sixth place. In 1995, Kuban won promotion to the Top Division with a strong finish, including a 3–0 victory over Anzhi in the last home match to claim second place in the First Division western zone.

After its return to Top Division in 1996, Kuban played unevenly. Although in mid-season the team was near the leaders, they lost many points at home and finished 10th overall. The following year was less successful; Kuban finished 16th, allowing it to remain in the Top Division.

In 1998, Kuban was in financial difficulty and on the verge of collapse. After its relegation to the Russian Professional Football League, the only player remaining was the team's third goalkeeper. Ivan Panenko, general director of OAO Rosneft-Krasnodarneftegaz, became the new president of the club and over the next two years laid the foundation for the future team.

Kuban's revival began in 1999, with the appointment of head coach Soferbi Yeshugov and the recruiting of local players. The club had a successful season, winning the Southern Zone championship.

=== 21st century ===
In 2000, Kuban amassed a 14-match winning streak and moved into first place. Despite a coaching change (to Irhin Alexandr), the club finished first in the Second Division southern zone and won two matches on aggregate against an evolving FC Saransk Lighting. Kuban won at home (1–0), and the second match was a scoreless draw. At the end of the year, the club prepared to compete in the First Division.

In early 2001, Kuban's management was assumed by the Krasnodar Krai government. The club's new president was governor Aleksander Tkachyov, who recruited Oleg Dolmatov as head coach to win promotion to the Russian Premier League. Although the club began the season well under Dolmatov, Kuban finished third and failed to win promotion.

The 2002 season saw conflicts between the coach and several players during the off-season. After a coaching change, the team rallied to finish fourth.

Despite the initial absence of a head coach in 2003, Kuban was in first place after the season's first half. The second half of the season began with a series of defeats which led to another coaching change. Kuban then won 11 consecutive matches (a record at the time for the First Division), finishing second and winning promotion to the Russian Premier League.

Poor coaching contributed to an unsuccessful 2004 season. Kuban finished 15th, and were again demoted. The season's only bright spot was a 2–1 home victory over eventual league champions Lokomotiv Moscow.

In 2005 Kuban was managed for the first time by a foreign coach, Jozef Chovanec from the Czech Republic. Although the season began well, with the team in first place at the end of the first half, Kuban lost several games early in the second half and finished fifth. The team refused to travel to Nalchik (under attack at the time by militants), and forfeited the match there. Kuban finished with the best defensive record in the league, conceding a club-record 25 goals in 42 matches.

Pavel Yakovenko was Kuban's coach in 2006. In first place until the last round, a 0–2 defeat against Khimki dropped the club to second place but they won promotion to the Russian Premier League.

The 2007 season began badly; the team did not win any games, and Yakovenko was replaced by Leonid Nazarenko. When Kuban did not improve, Nazarenko resigned as coach (ostensibly for family reasons) but remained with the club. Soferbi Yeshugov had a brief tenure as coach before Nazarenko again stepped in. In 15th place, Kuban finished next to last and was demoted to the First Division but the reserve club finished third place in their tournament. On 8 December, supporters rallied near the stadium in response to rumours of the club's fiscal collapse.

In 2008, Kuban celebrated their 80th anniversary. During the off-season, Aleksandr Tarkhanov was appointed head coach. After two rounds of poor play, Tarkhanov resigned (ostensibly for health reasons) and was replaced by Sergey Pavlov. The team finished second (behind Rostov), winning promotion to the Russian Premier League. Their stay was short-lived, however, since the club was relegated again to First Division after a 15th-place finish the following year (losing 3–0 at home to two-time champions Rubin Kazan) and the sacking of head coach Sergei Ovchinnikov. Kuban returned to the Premier League after defeating Zhemchuzhina 1–0 at Sochi on 17 October 2010 and a goalless draw with Nizhny Novgorod on 24 October.

Kuban began the 2011 Premier League season with a 2–0 defeat at home to Rubin Kazan. Improving, the club qualified for the playoffs after finishing sixth and were guaranteed a position in the Premier League the following season. Kuban faltered during the playoffs, and the club finished eighth. During the off-season, Dan Petrescu moved to Dynamo Moscow.

In the 2012 Premier League season, Kuban began with a 2–1 away loss to Anzhi Makhachkala. Despite the replacement of Yuri Krasnozhan by Belarusian coach Leonid Kuchuk, the club remained in the top half of the league and set a home attendance record with 313,997 spectators in 15 matches. Kuban defeated Anzhi 1–0 on 26 May 2013 with a lone goal from Bulgarian forward Ivelin Popov, finishing fifth (the club's best Premier League finish). With this showing the club qualified for the first time for the UEFA Europa League, and at the end of the season Kuban had the highest home-game attendance in the league.

On 30 May 2018, the Russian Football National League announced that Kuban failed in the appeal to obtain the FNL license for the 2018–19 season.

On 8 February 2018, Oleg Mkrtchyan, a businessman who was the owner of Kuban from 2013 to 2016, was arrested on charges of fraud.

On 24 July 2020, Russian Football Union approved the change of name by a different club that was founded in 2018 as FC Urozhay Krasnodar to FC Kuban, with the condition that the new club is not the legal successor to previous FC Kuban and cannot claim their sporting history.

==== Nikola Nikezić incident ====
Nikola Nikezić, a striker from Montenegro, was part of Kuban in 2010 and was under contract with the club until November 2011. In early 2011, the club, wishing to replace him, tried to persuade him to repudiate the contract. When Nikezić refused, he was beaten at the club office by two armed assailants with alleged ties to the Russian Mafia. After an assault estimated at 20 minutes by Nikezić, he signed a contract-dissolution agreement. The forward filed a complaint with FIFA president Sepp Blatter days after the incident, providing photos of injuries he sustained during the beating. FIFPro (the International Federation of Professional Footballers), with the assistance of the Russian Football Union, forced the club to pay Nikezić €180,000 in compensation.

== Honours ==
=== Domestic competitions ===
- RSFSR Championship: 4
  - Winners: 1948, 1962, 1973, 1987
- Russian First Division:
  - Winners: 2010
  - Runners-up: 2003, 2006, 2008
- Russian Cup:
  - Runners-up: 2014–15

== League results ==
=== Russia ===
Season	Div.	Pos.	Pl.	W	D	L	GS	GA	P	Cup	Europe	Top scorer (league)	Head coach
1992	1st	18	30	4	9	17	24	53	17	—	—	(Azerbaijan) (Russia) Lemish – 5	(Russia) Marushkin (Russia) I. V.Kaleshin
1993	2nd, "West"	15	42	15	8	19	62	84	38	R64	—	(Russia) Gomleshko – 19	(Russia) Nazarenko
1994	3rd, "West"	6	40	23	6	11	83	44	52	R256	—	(Russia) Gerasimenko – 16	(Russia) Nazarenko
1995	3rd, "West"	2	42	27	6	9	107	61	87	R128	—	(Russia) Gerasimenko – 30	(Russia) F. Novikov (Russia) Brazhnikov
1996	2nd	10	42	15	14	13	65	60	59	R32	—	(Russia) Shushlyakov – 15	(Russia) Brazhnikov
1997	2nd	16	42	16	9	17	63	66	57	R512	—	(Russia) Shushlyakov – 15	(Russia) Brazhnikov
1998	2nd	20	42	10	13	19	42	68	43	R16	—	(Russia) Suanov – 6	(Russia) Sinau
1999	3rd, "South"	1	36	29	4	3	80	13	91	R128	—	(Russia) Gabiskiria – 18	(Russia) Yeshugov
2000	3rd, "South"	1	38	32	3	3	95	13	99	R128	—	(Russia) Tsatskin – 14	(Russia) Yeshugov (Russia) Shcherbachenko
2001	2nd	3	34	16	12	6	56	29	60	R16	—	(Russia) Teryokhin – 15	(Russia) Dolmatov
2002	2nd	4	34	15	9	10	44	30	54	R16	—	(Russia) Yermak – 5 (Russia) Kiselyov – 5	(Russia) Dolmatov (Russia) Komarov
2003	2nd	2	42	27	5	10	75	38	86	R32	—	(Cameroon) Biang – 13	(Russia) Lagoida (Russia) Yuzhanin
2004	1st	15	30	6	10	14	26	42	28	R16	—	(Russia) Kantonistov – 8	(Russia) Yuzhanin (Russia) Yeshugov (Russia) Nazarenko
2005	2nd	5	42	23	12	7	55	25	81	R16	—	(Russia) Kantonistov – 11	(Czech Republic) Chovanec
2006	2nd	2	42	30	7	5	92	25	97	R32	—	(Armenia) (Russia) Zebelyan – 23	(Ukraine) Yakovenko
2007	1st	15	30	7	11	12	27	38	32	R32	—	(Russia) O.Ivanov – 4 (Russia) Kuzmichyov – 4 (Latvia) Laizāns – 4	(Russia) Yeshugov
2008	2nd	2	42	27	6	9	84	36	87	R16	—	(Russia) Zubko – 18	(Ukraine) Protasov
2009	1st	15	30	6	10	14	23	51	28	R32	—	(Mali) Traoré – 8	(Russia) Ovchinnikov (Armenia) (Russia) Galstyan
2010	2nd	1	38	24	8	6	51	20	80	R32	—	(Russia) Davydov – 10	(Romania) Petrescu
2011–12	1st	8	44	15	16	13	50	45	61	R32	—	(Ivory Coast) Traoré – 18	(Romania) Petrescu
2012–13	1st	5	30	14	9	7	48	28	51	QF	—	(Bulgaria) Popov – 9 (Armenia) Özbiliz – 9	(Russia) Krasnozhan (Belarus) Kuchuk
2013–14	1st	8	30	10	8	12	40	42	38	R16	EL GS	(Senegal) Baldé – 7	(Russia) Osinkin (Romania) Munteanu (Belarus) Goncharenko
2014–15	1st	10	30	8	12	10	32	36	36	Runners-up	—	(Senegal) Baldé – 5	(Belarus) Goncharenko (Belarus) Kuchuk (Belarus) Sosnitskiy
2015–16	1st	14	30	5	11	14	34	44	26	Quarterfinal	—	(Paraguay) Melgarejo – 8	(Russia) Khokhlov (Russia) Tashuyev (Russia) Papikyan (caretacker) (Russia) Osinkin
2016–17	2nd	7	38	14	13	11	44	37	55	R64	—	(Russia) Gogniyev – 10	(Russia) Yuzhanin

== European record ==
Season	Competition	Round	Opponent	Home	Away	Aggregate
2013–14	UEFA Europa League	3Q	(Scotland) Motherwell	1–0	2–0	3–0
2013–14	UEFA Europa League	Play-off	(Netherlands) Feyenoord	1–0	2–1	3–1
2013–14	UEFA Europa League	Group A	(Spain) Valencia	0–2	1–1	3rd place
2013–14	UEFA Europa League	Group A	(England) Swansea City	1–1	1–1	3rd place
2013–14	UEFA Europa League	Group A	(Switzerland) St.Gallen	4–0	0–2	3rd place

== Kuban-2 ==
Kuban's reserve squad FC Kuban-2 Krasnodar entered the third-tier Russian Professional Football League for the 2016–17 season.

== Managers ==
- (Soviet Union) Andrei Ageyev (1928–42)
- (Soviet Union) Ivan Sanzharov (1944–47)
- (Soviet Union) Andrei Ageyev (1948)
- (Soviet Union) Lev Zabutov (1949–55)
- (Soviet Union) Aleksandr Zagretsky (1955–56)
- (Soviet Union) Nikolai Rasskazov (1956–59)
- (Soviet Union) Yuri Khodotov (1960)
- (Soviet Union) Boris Smyslov (1961)
- (Soviet Union) Stanislav Shmerlin (1961–62)
- (Soviet Union) Vladimir Gorokhov (1962–63)
- (Soviet Union) Mikhail Antonevich (1964)
- (Soviet Union) Nikolai Rasskazov (1964)
- (Soviet Union) Aleksei Kostylev (1964–65)
- (Soviet Union) Valeri Bekhtenev (1966–67)
- (Soviet Union) Stanislav Shmerlin (1968)
- (Soviet Union) Nikolai Rasskazov (1969–70)
- (Soviet Union) Petr Scherbatenko (1971)
- (Soviet Union) Stanislav Shmerlin (1972–73)
- (Soviet Union) Vladimir Budagov (1973)
- (Soviet Union) Gennadi Matveyev (1974)
- (Soviet Union) Ruslan Dzasokhov (1975)
- (Soviet Union) Viktor Gureyev (1976)
- (Soviet Union) Viktor Korolkov (1977–79)
- (Soviet Union) Vladimir Mikhaylov (1980)
- (Soviet Union) Vladimir Belousov (1981–82)
- (Soviet Union) Yuri Semin (1982)
- (Soviet Union) Aleksandr Kochetkov (1983–85)
- (Soviet Union) Yuri Kolinko (1986)
- (Soviet Union) Khamza Bagapov (1987–88)
- (Soviet Union) Igor V. Kaleshin (1988)
- (Soviet Union) Georgi Bezbogin (1989–90)
- (Russia) Vladimir Brazhnikov (1990–91)
- (Russia) Yuri Marushkin (1991–92)
- (Russia) Igor V. Kaleshin (1992)
- (Russia) Leonid Nazarenko (1993–94)
- (Russia) Fyodor Novikov (1995)
- (Russia) Vladimir Brazhnikov (1995–97)
- (Russia) Valeri Sinau (1998)
- (Russia) Adolf Poskotin (1998)
- (Russia) Soferbiy Yeshugov (1999–00)
- (Russia) Fyodor Shcherbachenko (interim) (2000)
- (Russia) Oleg Dolmatov (2001–02)
- (Russia) Vyacheslav Komarov (2002)
- (Russia) Vladimir Lagoida (2003)
- (Russia) Nikolai Yuzhanin (2003–04)
- (Russia) Soferbiy Yeshugov (2004)
- (Russia) Leonid Nazarenko (interim) (2004)
- (Czech Republic) Jozef Chovanec (1 Jan 2005 – 31 December 2005)
- (Ukraine) Pavlo Yakovenko (1 Jan 2006 – 1 August 2007)
- (Russia) Leonid Nazarenko (interim) (1 Aug 2007 – 20 August 2007)
- (Russia) Soferbiy Yeshugov (20 Aug 2007 – 11 November 2007)
- (Russia) Alexander Tarkhanov (1 Jan 2008 – 3 April 2008)
- (Russia) Sergei Pavlov (3 April 2008 – 1 August 2008)
- (Armenia) (Russia) Poghos Galstyan (interim) (2008)
- (Ukraine) Oleg Protasov (1 Oct 2008 – 20 November 2008)
- (Russia) Sergei Ovchinnikov (1 Jan 2009 – 8 August 2009)
- (Armenia) (Russia) Poghos Galstyan (10 Aug 2009 – 28 December 2009)
- (Romania) Dan Petrescu (28 Dec 2009 – 14 August 2012)
- (Russia) Yuri Krasnozhan (16 Aug 2012 – 8 January 2013)
- (Belarus) Leonid Kuchuk (9 Jan 2013 – 30 June 2013)
- (Russia) Igor Osinkin (1 July 2013 – 31 July 2013)
- (Romania) Dorinel Munteanu (31 July 2013 – 12 October 2013)
- (Belarus) Viktor Goncharenko (12 Oct 2013–2014)
- (Belarus) Leonid Kuchuk (2014–2015)
- (Belarus) Andrei Sosnitskiy (2015)
- (Russia) Dmitri Khokhlov (2015)
- (Russia) Sergei Tashuyev (2015–2016)
- (Romania) Dan Petrescu (2016–)
