= FC Khimik Belorechensk =

- Full name: Football Club Khimik Belorechensk
- Founded: 1989
- Dissolved: 2002
- League: Amateur Football League, Zone Caucasus
- 2001: 13th

FC Khimik Belorechensk (Russian: «Химик» (Белореченск)) was a Russian football team from Belorechensk. It played professionally from 1989 to 1994. Its best result was 3rd place in the Zone 1 of the Russian Second Division in 1992.

== Team name history ==
- 1989 – MTsOP Khimik Belorechensk
- 1990–1994 – FC Khimik Belorechensk
- 1997–2000 – FC Dynamo Belorechensk
- 2001 – FC Khimik Belorechensk
