= FC Druzhba Maykop =

Russian football club

- Full name: Football Club Druzhba Maykop
- Founded: 1963; 63 years ago
- Ground: Stadium Yunost
- Capacity: 16,000
- Chairman: Andrei Ushenin
- Manager: Aleksandr Kayvanov
- League: Russian Second League, Division B, Group 1
- 2026: 5th
- Website: фк-дружба.рф

Logo used till 2017

FC Druzhba Maykop (Russian: ФК "Дружба" Майкоп) is a Russian association football club from Maykop, Republic of Adygea, founded in 1963. It is playing in the fourth-tier Russian Second League Division B. Their biggest achievement was reaching the semifinal of the Russian Cup in the 1992/93 cycle. The club was known as Urozhai Maykop from 1963 to 1968.

== Current squad ==
As of 11 September 2026, according to the Second League website.

Note: Flags indicate national team as defined under FIFA eligibility rules; some limited exceptions apply. Players may hold more than one non-FIFA nationality.

No.	Pos.	Nation	Player
1	GK	RUS	Tamerlan Khachirov
4	DF	RUS	Madin Kobzh
5	DF	RUS	Zaur Datiyev
7	FW	RUS	Amir Konov
8	MF	RUS	Tamirlan Khakhov
9	FW	RUS	Anzor Ashev
10	FW	RUS	Artur Zezarakhov
11	FW	RUS	Inver Kazarov
12	GK	RUS	Yegor Kudryavtsev
13	FW	RUS	Asker Delok
15	DF	RUS	Arkady Solop
17	MF	RUS	Maksim Malysh

No.	Pos.	Nation	Player
18	DF	RUS	Nikita Vasilyev
22	GK	RUS	Renat Tlyashok
23	DF	RUS	Rustem Blyagoz
27	MF	RUS	Eddi Tsanava
44	DF	RUS	Soslan Cherdzhiyev
47	MF	RUS	Azamat Kufanov
63	MF	RUS	Zaid Koblev
70	MF	RUS	Ruslan Khuako
76	MF	RUS	Nikita Shustov
77	MF	RUS	Tamirlan Yedygov
97	FW	RUS	Alan Khapishtov
99	MF	RUS	Kirill Yushko

== Reserve squad ==
Druzhba's reserve squad played professionally as Druzhba-d Maykop and Kommunalnik-Druzhba-d Maykop in the Russian Third League in 1995 and 1996 respectively.
