= 2017–18 FC SKA-Khabarovsk season =

FC SKA-Khabarovsk
2017–18 season
- Chairman: Viktor Goncharov
- Manager: Aleksei Poddubskiy (until 20 December 2017); Rinat Bilyaletdinov (12 January-31 March 2018); Sergei Perednya (from 3 April 2018)
- Stadium: Lenin Stadium
- Premier League: 16th
- Russian Cup: Quarterfinal vs Shinnik Yaroslavl
- Top goalscorer: League: Miroslav Marković (4); All: Miroslav Marković (5)
Home colours	Away colours

The 2017–18 FC SKA-Khabarovsk season is the club's first season in the Russian Premier League, the highest tier of football in Russia. SKA-Khabarovsk will also take part in the Russian Cup, entering at the round of 32 stage.

== Season events ==
On 20 December 2017, manager Aleksei Poddubskiy become the club's new Sporting Director, with Rinat Bilyaletdinov being appointed as the club's new manager on 12 January 2018. Bilyaletdinov himself resigned as manager on 31 March after taking just 1 point from 4 games. On 3 April 2018 Sergei Perednya was appointed as the club's new manager.

== Squad ==
As of 22 February 2018

Note: Flags indicate national team as defined under FIFA eligibility rules; some limited exceptions apply. Players may hold more than one non-FIFA nationality.

No.	Pos.	Nation	Player
1	GK	RUS	Aleksandr Dovbnya
2	MF	RUS	Sergei Makarov
3	DF	RUS	Ismail Ediyev
4	DF	SRB	Nemanja Tubić
5	DF	RUS	Aleksandr Putsko (loan from Ufa)
6	MF	RUS	Pavel Karasyov (loan from Anzhi Makhachkala)
7	MF	ARG	Alejandro Barbaro
8	DF	NGR	Dele Adeleye
9	FW	ARM	Ruslan Koryan
10	MF	RUS	Vladislav Nikiforov
11	FW	SRB	Miroslav Marković
13	DF	RUS	Aleksandr Dimidko
14	MF	RUS	Dmitri Bogayev (loan from Zenit St.Petersburg)
15	MF	RUS	Yevgeni Balyaikin
17	MF	RUS	Dmitri Kabutov
19	MF	UKR	Vitaliy Fedotov

No.	Pos.	Nation	Player
20	FW	RUS	Maksim Kanunnikov
21	MF	RUS	Artyom Samsonov
22	FW	RUS	Kirill Kolesnichenko
26	MF	RUS	Aleksandr Cherevko
29	GK	RUS	Vladislav Soromytko
37	DF	UKR	Dmytro Hryshko
44	FW	POL	Łukasz Sekulski
50	DF	RUS	Maksim Karpov (loan from Zenit St.Petersburg)
55	GK	RUS	Aleksandr Krivoruchko
70	MF	RUS	Georgi Makhatadze (loan from Rubin Kazan)
74	GK	RUS	Aleksandr Akishin
77	MF	RUS	Konstantin Savichev
78	MF	RUS	Nikolay Kalinsky
87	MF	TKM	Maksim Kazankov
88	DF	GEO	Giorgi Navalovski
96	MF	RUS	Aleksandr Maksimenko

== Transfers ==
=== Summer ===
In: Note: Flags indicate national team as defined under FIFA eligibility rules; some limited exceptions apply. Players may hold more than one non-FIFA nationality.

No.	Pos.	Nation	Player
4	DF	RUS	Maksim Tishkin (from (Russia) Baltika Kaliningrad)
5	DF	RUS	Aleksandr Putsko (loan from (Russia) Ufa)
6	MF	RUS	Pavel Karasyov (on loan from (Russia) Anzhi Makhachkala)
7	MF	ARG	Alejandro Barbaro (from (Cyprus) Apollon Limassol)
8	MF	RUS	Georgy Gabulov (from (Russia) Orenburg)
11	FW	SRB	Miroslav Marković (from (Czech Republic) Bohemians 1905)
15	DF	RUS	Yevgeni Balyaikin (from (Russia) Tom Tomsk)
19	MF	UKR	Vitaliy Fedotov (from (Latvia) Riga)
37	DF	UKR	Dmytro Hryshko (from (Ukraine) Olimpik Donetsk)
41	GK	RUS	Vyacheslav Agafonov
42	DF	RUS	Kirill Arshansky
43	DF	RUS	Kirill Blokhin
45	MF	RUS	Artyom Bobrovsky
46	MF	RUS	Andrei Golovatyuk
47	DF	RUS	Artur Gulm
48	MF	RUS	Mikhail Degtyaryov
49	DF	RUS	Aleksei Kuchin
51	MF	RUS	Aleksandr Lomachenko
52	DF	RUS	Denis Lyubimov
54	GK	RUS	Aleksandr Mitrofanov
56	MF	RUS	Yegor Golovashkin
57	MF	RUS	Nikita Zotov
58	DF	RUS	Stepan Safronov
60	DF	RUS	Ilya Kalinin
61	MF	RUS	Roman Slesarev (from (Russia) Smena Komsomolsk-na-Amure)
62	MF	RUS	Igor Stepanenko
63	MF	RUS	Kirill Tsaryov
65	MF	RUS	Ilya Bryukhanov
77	MF	RUS	Konstantin Savichev (from (Russia) Spartak Moscow)
88	DF	GEO	Giorgi Navalovski (from (Azerbaijan) Neftchi Baku)
91	FW	BUL	Ventsislav Hristov (from (Bulgaria) Neftochimic Burgas)
92	MF	RUS	Dmitri Mungalov
96	MF	RUS	Aleksandr Maksimenko
97	MF	RUS	Manvel Agaronyan (end of loan to (Russia) Smena Komsomolsk-na-Amure)
—	FW	KGZ	Anton Zemlianukhin (from (Thailand) Sukhothai)

Out: Note: Flags indicate national team as defined under FIFA eligibility rules; some limited exceptions apply. Players may hold more than one non-FIFA nationality.

No.	Pos.	Nation	Player
2	DF	RUS	Anton Kupchin
4	MF	RUS	Maksim Astafyev (end of loan from (Russia) Mordovia Saransk)
6	MF	RUS	Pavel Karasyov (to (Russia) Anzhi Makhachkala)
11	FW	RUS	Eduard Buliya (to (Russia) Shinnik Yaroslavl)
15	DF	LTU	Tomas Mikuckis
17	MF	RUS	Aleksandr Verulidze (to (Russia) Fakel Voronezh)
19	MF	RUS	Vasili Pletin
22	FW	RUS	Anton Kobyalko (to (Russia) Baltika Kaliningrad)
23	FW	ARG	Juan Lescano (to (Russia) Anzhi Makhachkala)
33	DF	RUS	Igor Udaly (to (Russia) Anzhi Makhachkala)
35	MF	RUS	Artur Rylov (to (Russia) Rotor Volgograd)
59	DF	RUS	Andrei Ivanov (to (Russia) Torpedo Moscow)
77	DF	RUS	David Ozmanov (to (Russia) Sokol Saratov)
88	DF	RUS	Andrei Kireyev (to (Russia) Rotor Volgograd)
—	DF	RUS	Nikolai Radchenko (to (Russia) Nosta Novotroitsk, previously on loan to (Russia) Tyumen)
—	FW	KGZ	Anton Zemlianukhin

=== Winter ===
In: Note: Flags indicate national team as defined under FIFA eligibility rules; some limited exceptions apply. Players may hold more than one non-FIFA nationality.

No.	Pos.	Nation	Player
2	MF	RUS	Sergei Makarov
4	DF	SRB	Nemanja Tubić (from (Serbia) Napredak Kruševac)
8	DF	NGR	Dele Adeleye
14	MF	RUS	Dmitri Bogayev (on loan from (Russia) Zenit St.Petersburg)
17	FW	RUS	Dmitri Kabutov (from (Russia) Volgar Astrakhan)
20	FW	RUS	Maksim Kanunnikov (from (Russia) Rubin Kazan)
21	MF	RUS	Artyom Samsonov (from (Russia) Spartak Moscow)
44	FW	POL	Łukasz Sekulski (from (Poland) Jagiellonia Białystok)
50	DF	RUS	Maksim Karpov (loan from (Russia) Zenit St.Petersburg)
70	MF	RUS	Georgi Makhatadze (on loan from (Russia) Rubin Kazan)
74	GK	RUS	Aleksandr Akishin (from (Russia) Atom Novovoronezh)
—	FW	RUS	Kirill Kolesnichenko (from (Russia) Chertanovo Moscow)

Out: Note: Flags indicate national team as defined under FIFA eligibility rules; some limited exceptions apply. Players may hold more than one non-FIFA nationality.

No.	Pos.	Nation	Player
4	DF	RUS	Maksim Tishkin (to (Russia) Baltika Kaliningrad)
8	MF	RUS	Georgy Gabulov
20	FW	RUS	Nikita Dyachenko (to (Russia) Smena Komsomolsk-na-Amure)
30	MF	RUS	Aleksei Druzin (to (Russia) Rotor Volgograd)
69	MF	UKR	Denys Dedechko (to (Ukraine) Mariupol)
91	FW	BUL	Ventsislav Hristov (to (Bulgaria) Vereya)

== Competitions ==
=== Russian Premier League ===
==== Results by round ====
Round	1	2	3	4	5	6	7	8	9	10	11	12	13	14	15	16	17	18	19	20	21	22	23	24	25	26	27	28	29	30
Ground	H	A	A	A	H	H	A	H	A	H	A	H	A	H	A	H	H	H	A	A	H	A	H	A	H	A	H	A	H	A
Result	L	L	L	L	W	D	D	D	D	D	L	W	L	D	L	L	L	L	L	L	L	L	L	D	L	L	L	L	L	L
Position	16	15	16	16	14	14	14	15	14	15	15	14	15	16	16	16	16	16	16	16	16	16	16	16	16	16	16	16	16	16

Updated to match(es) played on 13 May 2018. Source: See Results
A = Away; H = Home; W = Win; D = Draw; L = Loss

==== Results ====
16 July 2017 1	SKA-Khabarovsk	0 – 2	Zenit St.Petersburg	Khabarovsk
18:00 VLAT (UTC+10)	Kazankov (yellow card) 42'	Report	Yerokhin (yellow card) 30'; Smolnikov (yellow card) 40'; Kuzyayev 52' (yellow card) 85'; Kokorin (yellow card) 67' (goal) 81'	Stadium: Lenin Stadium; Attendance: 14,200; Referee: Roman Galimov

25 July 2017 2	Arsenal Tula	1 – 0	SKA-Khabarovsk	Tula
02:30 VLAT (UTC+10)	Tkachyov 18'; Gabulov (yellow card) 90+4'; Čaušić (yellow card) 90+4'	Report	Kazankov (yellow card) 31'; Cherevko (yellow card) 40'	Stadium: Arsenal Stadium; Attendance: 12,700; Referee: Evgeny Turbin

29 July 2017 3	CSKA Moscow	2 – 0	SKA-Khabarovsk	Moscow
22:00 VLAT (UTC+10)	Golovin 4'; Natkho 37' (pen.)	Report	Ediyev (yellow card) 36'; Balyaikin (yellow card) 43'	Stadium: VEB Arena; Attendance: 8,500; Referee: Kirill Levnikov

6 August 2017 4	Lokomotiv Moscow	1 – 0	SKA-Khabarovsk	Moscow
03:00 VLAT (UTC+10)	Al.Miranchuk 75'	Report	Dimidko (yellow card) 49'; Balyaikin (yellow card) 61'	Stadium: Lokomotiv Stadium; Attendance: 8,160; Referee: Sergey Lapochkin

8 August 2017 5	SKA-Khabarovsk	2 – 0	Anzhi Makhachkala	Khabarovsk
18:00 VLAT (UTC+10)	Ediyev (yellow card) 57'; Marković 68'; Dovbnya (yellow card) 88'; Kalinsky 90+4'	Report	Phibel (yellow card) 90+2'	Stadium: Lenin Stadium; Attendance: 8,100; Referee: Aleksei Matyunin

13 August 2017 6	SKA-Khabarovsk	1 – 1	Rubin Kazan	Khabarovsk
18:00 VLAT (UTC+10)	Dedechko (yellow card) 79'; Hristov 82'; Kazankov (yellow card) 90'	Report	Bauer (yellow card) 75'; Caktaš 90+2'	Stadium: Lenin Stadium; Attendance: 11,230; Referee: Aleksei Nikolaev

19 August 2017 7	Tosno	0 – 0	SKA-Khabarovsk	Saint Petersburg
02:30 VLAT (UTC+10)		Report	Putsko (yellow card) 90'	Stadium: Petrovsky Stadium; Attendance: 6,574; Referee: Pavel Kukuyan

27 August 2017 8	SKA-Khabarovsk	0 – 0	Spartak Moscow	Khabarovsk
18:00 VLAT (UTC+10)	Koryan (yellow card) 56'; Putsko (yellow card) 79'; Nikiforov (yellow card) 84'; Navalovski (yellow card) 88'; Dovbnya (yellow card) 90+4'	Report	Bocchetti (yellow card) 56'	Stadium: Lenin Stadium; Attendance: 14,524; Referee: Roman Galimov

12 September 2017 9	Ural Yekaterinburg	1 – 1	SKA-Khabarovsk	Yekaterinburg
00:30 VLAT (UTC+10)	Haroyan (yellow card) 40'; Chanturia 54' (pen.)	Report	Gabulov (yellow card) 40'; Kazankov (yellow card) 44'; Dedechko (yellow card) 63'; Fedotov 75'	Stadium: SKB-Bank Arena; Attendance: 2,602; Referee: Kirill Levnikov

17 September 2017 10	SKA-Khabarovsk	2 – 2	Akhmat Grozny	Khabarovsk
18:00 VLAT (UTC+10)	Savichev 13'; Koryan (yellow card) 62'; Navalovski (yellow card) 83'; Hristov 88'	Report	Shvets (yellow card) 58' (goal) 82'; Mbengue 65'; Berisha (yellow card) 83'	Stadium: Lenin Stadium; Attendance: 7,447; Referee: Aleksei Eskov

26 September 2017 11	Amkar Perm	3 – 0	SKA-Khabarovsk	Perm
00:00 VLAT (UTC+10)	Gol 38'; Bodul 84'; Zaytsev (yellow card) 90+2'; Komolov 90+3'	Report	Ediyev (yellow card) 68'	Stadium: Zvezda Stadium; Attendance: 3,890; Referee: Vladimir Moskalyov

30 September 2017 12	SKA-Khabarovsk	2 – 1	Rostov	Khabarovsk
18:30 VLAT (UTC+10)	Marković 17'; Ediyev (yellow card) 35'; Dedechko 71'; Kazankov (yellow card) 73'	Report	Wilusz (yellow card) 21'; Ustinov 45'; Makeyev (yellow card) 51'; Gațcan (yellow card) 58'; Bukharov (yellow card) 90'	Stadium: Lenin Stadium; Attendance: 6,535; Referee: Igor Fedotov

14 October 2017 13	Dynamo Moscow	2 – 0	SKA-Khabarovsk	Khimki
21:00 VLAT (UTC+10)	Kozlov 18'; Tashayev 78'	Report		Stadium: Arena Khimki; Attendance: 3,632; Referee: Sergey Ivanov

21 October 2017 14	SKA-Khabarovsk	2 – 2	Ufa	Khabarovsk
18:30 VLAT (UTC+10)	Dimidko 11'; Dedechko 39'; Navalovski (yellow card) 64'; Savichev (yellow card) 89'	Report	Alikin (yellow card) 30'; Tumasyan (yellow card) 44'; Krotov 54', 72'; Jokić (yellow card) 56'	Stadium: Lenin Stadium; Attendance: 5,399; Referee: Sergey Kulikov

30 October 2017 15	Krasnodar	4 – 1	SKA-Khabarovsk	Krasnodar
02:00 VLAT (UTC+10)	Claesson 11'; Mamayev (yellow card) 19'; Smolov 41', 80' (pen.); Gritsayenko (yellow card) 59'; Wanderson 89'; Pereyra (yellow card) 90'	Report	Marković 60' (pen.); Koryan (yellow card) 79'	Stadium: Krasnodar Stadium; Attendance: 18,537; Referee: Aleksey Eskov

5 November 2017 16	SKA-Khabarovsk	1 – 2	Arsenal Tula	Khabarovsk
18:00 VLAT (UTC+10)	Fedotov 33'; Dedechko (yellow card) 39'; Ediyev (yellow card) 59'	Report	Kangwa 5'; Grigalava (yellow card) 42'; Đorđević 86'; Gorbatenko (yellow card) 90+1'	Stadium: Lenin Stadium; Attendance: 4,155; Referee: Evgeny Turbin

18 November 2017 17	SKA-Khabarovsk	2 – 4	CSKA Moscow	Khabarovsk
18:00 VLAT (UTC+10)	Dedechko 5'; Nikiforov (yellow card) 50'; Dimidko (yellow card) 61'; Marković 81'	Report	Dzagoev 12' (yellow card) 56'; Wernbloom 74', 83'; Golovin (yellow card) 77'; Vitinho 90+3'	Stadium: Lenin Stadium; Attendance: 5,569; Referee: Artem Chistyakov

27 November 2017 18	SKA-Khabarovsk	1 – 2	Lokomotiv Moscow	Khabarovsk
19:00 VLAT (UTC+10)	Fedotov 17'; Dimidko (yellow card) 43'; Dovbnya (yellow card) 90+1'; Dedechko (yellow card) 90+2'	Report	Cherevko 15' (o.g.); Mykhalyk (yellow card) 88'; Farfán (penalty missed) 90+3' 90+3'	Stadium: Lenin Stadium; Attendance: 4,011; Referee: Roman Galimov

4 December 2017 19	Anzhi Makhachkala	4 – 0	SKA-Khabarovsk	Kaspiysk
02:00 VLAT (UTC+10)	Lescano 1'; Poluyakhtov 8'; Markelov 43'; Armaș 85'	Report	Krivoruchko (red card) 26'	Stadium: Anzhi Arena; Attendance: 3,100; Referee: Aleksey Eskov

9 December 2017 20	Rubin Kazan	3 – 1	SKA-Khabarovsk	Kazan
23:30 VLAT (UTC+10)	Nabiullin (yellow card) 8'; Kudryashov (yellow card) 15'; Sorokin (yellow card) 20'; Azmoun 25'; Kanunnikov 40'; Ozdoyev 49'; Caktaš (yellow card) 63'	Report	Dimidko (yellow card) 38'; Maksimenko 74'	Stadium: Kazan Arena; Attendance: 3,112; Referee: Igor Fedotov

4 March 2018 21	SKA-Khabarovsk	0 – 1	Tosno	Khabarovsk
18:00 VLAT (UTC+10)	Bogayev (yellow card) 30'; Tubić (yellow card) 39'; Samsonov (yellow card) 72'	Report	Mirzov (yellow card) 24' (goal) 69'; Chernov (yellow card) 41'; Zhigulyov (yellow card) 67'; Mikhail OparinOparin (yellow card) 90+2'	Stadium: Lenin Stadium; Attendance: 2,049; Referee: Roman Galimov

12 March 2018 22	Spartak Moscow	1 – 0	SKA-Khabarovsk	Moscow
02:00 VLAT (UTC+10)	Promes (yellow card) 27' (penalty missed) 29'; Fernando 90' (yellow card) 90+1'	Report	Samsonov (yellow card) 21'	Stadium: Otkritie Arena; Attendance: 21,779; Referee: Kirill Levnikov

17 March 2018 23	SKA-Khabarovsk	0 – 3	Ural Yekaterinburg	Khabarovsk
18:00 VLAT (UTC+10)	Balyaikin (yellow card) 21'	Report	Fidler (yellow card) 12'; Ilyin 26', 89'; Bicfalvi (yellow card) 50'; El Kabir 72'	Stadium: Lenin Stadium; Attendance: 3,821; Referee: Igor Fedotov

1 April 2018 24	Akhmat Grozny	0 – 0	SKA-Khabarovsk	Grozny
21:00 VLAT (UTC+10)	Ivanov (yellow card) 38'; Sadayev (yellow card) 78'	Report	Ediyev (yellow card) 40'	Stadium: Akhmat-Arena; Attendance: 8,375; Referee: Sergey Karasev

7 April 2018 25	SKA-Khabarovsk	0 – 2	Amkar Perm	Khabarovsk
18:00 VLAT (UTC+10)	Kabutov (red card) 56'	Report	Ryazantsev 45+1'; Kostyukov 90+2'; Condé (yellow card) 90+2'	Stadium: Lenin Stadium; Attendance: 4,897; Referee: Vladislav Bezborodov

16 April 2018 26	Rostov	2 – 0	SKA-Khabarovsk	Rostov-on-Don
02:00 VLAT (UTC+10)	Sigurðarson 40'; Kalachev (yellow card) 85'; Bayramyan 89'	Report	Kazankov (yellow card) 70'; Ediyev (yellow card) 88'	Stadium: Rostov Arena; Attendance: 12,736; Referee: Vladimir Moskalyov

22 April 2018 27	SKA-Khabarovsk	0 – 1	Dynamo Moscow	Khabarovsk
18:00 VLAT (UTC+10)	Hryshko (yellow card) 36'	Report	Šunjić (yellow card) 7'; Sow (yellow card) 34'; Rykov (yellow card) 43'; Tashayev 69'	Stadium: Lenin Stadium; Attendance: 6,120; Referee: Sergey Ivanov

30 April 2018 28	Ufa	1 – 0	SKA-Khabarovsk	Ufa
18:30 VLAT (UTC+10)	Sysuyev 3'	Report	Hryshko (yellow card) 15'; Adeleye (yellow card) 36'; Samsonov (yellow card) 75'	Stadium: Neftyanik Stadium; Attendance: 6,262; Referee: Vladislav Bezborodov

5 May 2018 29	SKA-Khabarovsk	0 – 1	Krasnodar	Khabarovsk
18:00 VLAT (UTC+10)	Kanunnikov (penalty missed) 90+3'	Report	Claesson 45+1'	Stadium: Lenin Stadium; Attendance: 6,520; Referee: Aleksey Eskov

13 May 2018 30	Zenit St.Petersburg	6 – 0	SKA-Khabarovsk	Saint Petersburg
23:00 VLAT (UTC+10)	Driussi 6'; Zabolotny 21'; Kuzyayev (yellow card) 37'; Yerokhin 38', 49', 60', 78'; Mevlja (yellow card) 54'; Zhirkov (yellow card) 56'	Report	Savichev (yellow card) 65'; Cherevko (yellow card) 74'	Stadium: Krestovsky Stadium; Attendance: 46,218; Referee: Aleksei Matyunin

==== League table ====
Pos	Team	Pld	W	D	L	GF	GA	GD	Pts	Qualification or relegation
12	Ural Yekaterinburg	30	8	13	9	31	32	−1	37 (Note: Head-to-head: Rostov 1–0 Ural, Ural 1–1 Rostov)	
13	Amkar Perm (D)	30	9	8	13	20	30	−10	35	Dissolved after the season (Note: On 13 June 2018, FC Amkar Perm announced that the Russian Football Union recalled their 2018–19 season license, making them ineligible for the Russian Premier League or Russian Football National League. On 18 June 2018, club president Gennadi Shilov announced that the club will not register for the third-tier Russian Professional Football League and will be dissolved. As a consequence, Anzhi Makhachkala was not relegated.)
14	Anzhi Makhachkala	30	6	6	18	31	55	−24	24 (Note: Head-to-head: Anzhi 2–0 Tosno, Tosno 2–2 Anzhi)	Qualification for the Relegation play-offs
15	Tosno (D)	30	6	6	18	23	54	−31	24	Dissolved after the season (Note: On 30 May 2018, Russian Football National League announced that FC Tosno failed in its appeal to obtain the FNL license for the 2018–19 season. On 9 June 2018, the founder of FORT Group (the company that owned the team), Maxim Levchenko, announced that the team is officially dissolved.)
16	SKA-Khabarovsk (R)	30	2	7	21	16	55	−39	13	Relegation to Football National League

Updated to match(es) played on 13 May 2018. Source: Russian Premier League, Soccerway
Rules for classification: 1) Points; 2) Head-to-head points; 3) Head-to-head matches won; 4) Head-to-head goal difference; 5) Head-to-head goals scored; 6) Head-to-head away goals; 7) Matches won; 8) Goal difference; 9) Goals scored; 10) Away goals scored.
(D) Dissolved after the season; (R) Relegated

=== Russian Cup ===
21 September 2017 Round of 32	Ararat Moscow	1 – 2	SKA Khabarovsk	Moscow
02:00 VLAT (UTC+10)	Zemchenkov 48'; Kvekveskiri (yellow card) 50'; Tarakanov (yellow card) 65'; Samoshnikov (yellow card) 70'	Report	Balyaikin (yellow card) 61'; Kazankov 68'; Kalinsky 80'	Stadium: Eduard Streltsov Stadium; Attendance: 700; Referee: Dmitry Nedvizh

25 October 2017 Round of 16	SKA-Khabarovsk	2 – 0	Dynamo St.Petersburg	Khabarovsk
18:30 VLAT (UTC+10)	Navalovski 61'; Marković 72'	Report		Stadium: Lenin Stadium; Attendance: 4,257; Referee: Oleg Sokolov

27 February 2018 Quarterfinal	SKA-Khabarovsk	0 – 0 (a.e.t.) (1 – 4 p)	Shinnik Yaroslavl	Khabarovsk
18:30 VLAT (UTC+10)	Kabutov (yellow card) 3'	Report	Nizamutdinov (yellow card) 50'; Narylkov (yellow card) 53'; Bezlikhotnov (yellow card) 113'	Stadium: Lenin Stadium; Attendance: 2,405; Referee: Evgeny Turbin
	Penalties
	Samsonov (penalty scored); Kalinsky (penalty missed); Grishin (penalty missed); Marković (penalty missed)		(penalty scored) Bezlikhotnov; (penalty scored) Nizamutdinov; (penalty scored) Shaymordanov; (penalty scored) Kamilov

== Squad statistics ==
As of match played 13 May 2018

=== Appearances and goals ===
No.	Pos	Nat	Player	Total		Premier League		Russian Cup	
No.	Pos	Nat	Player	Apps	Goals	Apps	Goals	Apps	Goals
1	GK	(Russia) RUS	Aleksandr Dovbnya	26	0	25+1	0	0	0
2	MF	(Russia) RUS	Sergei Makarov	3	0	3	0	0	0
3	DF	(Russia) RUS	Ismail Ediyev	21	0	19+1	0	1	0
4	DF	(Serbia) SRB	Nemanja Tubić	4	0	3	0	1	0
5	DF	(Russia) RUS	Aleksandr Putsko	22	0	20	0	2	0
6	MF	(Russia) RUS	Pavel Karasyov	19	0	15+2	0	2	0
7	MF	(Argentina) ARG	Alejandro Barbaro	4	0	0+3	0	1	0
8	DF	(Nigeria) NGR	Dele Adeleye	2	0	2	0	0	0
9	MF	(Armenia) ARM	Ruslan Koryan	14	0	9+3	0	2	0
10	FW	(Russia) RUS	Vladislav Nikiforov	26	0	19+5	0	2	0
11	FW	(Serbia) SRB	Miroslav Marković	25	5	19+4	4	1+1	1
13	DF	(Russia) RUS	Aleksandr Dimidko	23	1	23	1	0	0
14	MF	(Russia) RUS	Dmitri Bogayev	2	0	1	0	1	0
15	MF	(Russia) RUS	Yevgeni Balyaikin	16	0	12+2	0	2	0
17	MF	(Russia) RUS	Dmitri Kabutov	8	0	7	0	1	0
19	MF	(Ukraine) UKR	Vitaliy Fedotov	20	3	11+8	3	0+1	0
20	FW	(Russia) RUS	Maksim Kanunnikov	9	0	9	0	0	0
21	MF	(Russia) RUS	Artyom Samsonov	9	0	7+1	0	1	0
22	FW	(Russia) RUS	Anton Kobyalko	4	0	1+3	0	0	0
26	MF	(Russia) RUS	Aleksandr Cherevko	19	0	14+3	0	2	0
37	DF	(Ukraine) UKR	Dmytro Hryshko	19	0	15+1	0	3	0
44	FW	(Poland) POL	Łukasz Sekulski	9	0	5+4	0	0	0
50	DF	(Russia) RUS	Maksim Karpov	4	0	3	0	1	0
55	GK	(Russia) RUS	Aleksandr Krivoruchko	7	0	5	0	2	0
70	MF	(Russia) RUS	Georgi Makhatadze	1	0	0+1	0	0	0
77	MF	(Russia) RUS	Konstantin Savichev	18	1	13+4	1	1	0
78	MF	(Russia) RUS	Nikolay Kalinsky	15	2	5+7	1	2+1	1
87	MF	(Turkmenistan) TKM	Maksim Kazankov	24	1	11+11	0	2	1
88	DF	(Georgia (country)) GEO	Giorgi Navalovski	24	1	22	0	0+2	1
96	FW	(Russia) RUS	Aleksandr Maksimenko	2	1	0+2	1	0	0
Players away from the club on loan:
Players who left SKA-Khabarovsk during the season:
4	DF	(Russia) RUS	Maksim Tishkin	4	0	2+1	0	1	0
8	MF	(Russia) RUS	Georgy Gabulov	11	0	8+3	0	0	0
23	FW	(Argentina) ARG	Juan Lescano	2	0	2	0	0	0
30	MF	(Russia) RUS	Aleksei Druzin	2	0	1+1	0	0	0
69	MF	(Ukraine) UKR	Denys Dedechko	20	3	18	3	2	0
91	FW	(Bulgaria) BUL	Ventsislav Hristov	14	2	1+11	2	0+2	0

=== Goal scorers ===
Place	Position	Nation	Number	Name	Premier League	Russian Cup	Total
1	FW	(Serbia)	11	Miroslav Marković	4	1	5
2	MF	(Ukraine)	69	Denys Dedechko	3	0	3
2	MF	(Ukraine)	19	Vitaliy Fedotov	3	0	3
4	FW	(Bulgaria)	91	Ventsislav Hristov	2	0	2
4	MF	(Russia)	78	Nikolay Kalinsky	1	1	2
6	MF	(Russia)	77	Konstantin Savichev	1	0	1
6	DF	(Russia)	13	Aleksandr Dimidko	1	0	1
6	FW	(Russia)	96	Aleksandr Maksimenko	1	0	1
6	MF	(Turkmenistan)	87	Maksim Kazankov	0	1	1
6	DF	(Georgia (country))	88	Giorgi Navalovski	0	1	1
				TOTALS	16	4	20

=== Disciplinary record ===
Number	Nation	Position	Name	Premier League		Russian Cup		Total	
Number	Nation	Position	Name	Yellow card	Red card	Yellow card	Red card	Yellow card	Red card
1	(Russia)	GK	Aleksandr Dovbnya	3	0	0	0	3	0
3	(Russia)	DF	Ismail Ediyev	7	0	0	0	7	0
4	(Serbia)	DF	Nemanja Tubić	1	0	0	0	1	0
5	(Russia)	DF	Aleksandr Putsko	2	0	0	0	2	0
8	(Nigeria)	DF	Dele Adeleye	1	0	0	0	1	0
9	(Armenia)	MF	Ruslan Koryan	3	0	0	0	3	0
10	(Russia)	FW	Vladislav Nikiforov	2	0	0	0	2	0
13	(Russia)	DF	Aleksandr Dimidko	4	0	0	0	4	0
15	(Russia)	MF	Yevgeni Balyaikin	2	0	1	0	3	0
14	(Russia)	MF	Dmitri Bogayev	1	0	0	0	1	0
17	(Russia)	MF	Dmitri Kabutov	0	1	1	0	1	1
21	(Russia)	MF	Artyom Samsonov	3	0	0	0	3	0
26	(Russia)	MF	Aleksandr Cherevko	2	0	0	0	2	0
37	(Ukraine)	DF	Dmytro Hryshko	2	0	0	0	2	0
55	(Russia)	GK	Aleksandr Krivoruchko	0	1	0	0	0	1
77	(Russia)	MF	Konstantin Savichev	2	0	0	0	2	0
87	(Turkmenistan)	MF	Maksim Kazankov	6	0	0	0	6	0
88	(Georgia (country))	DF	Giorgi Navalovski	3	0	0	0	3	0
Players who left SKA-Khabarovsk during the season:
8	(Russia)	MF	Georgy Gabulov	1	0	0	0	1	0
69	(Ukraine)	MF	Denys Dedechko	4	0	0	0	4	0
			TOTALS	50	2	2	0	52	2
