= Vladislav Nikiforov =

Russian footballer

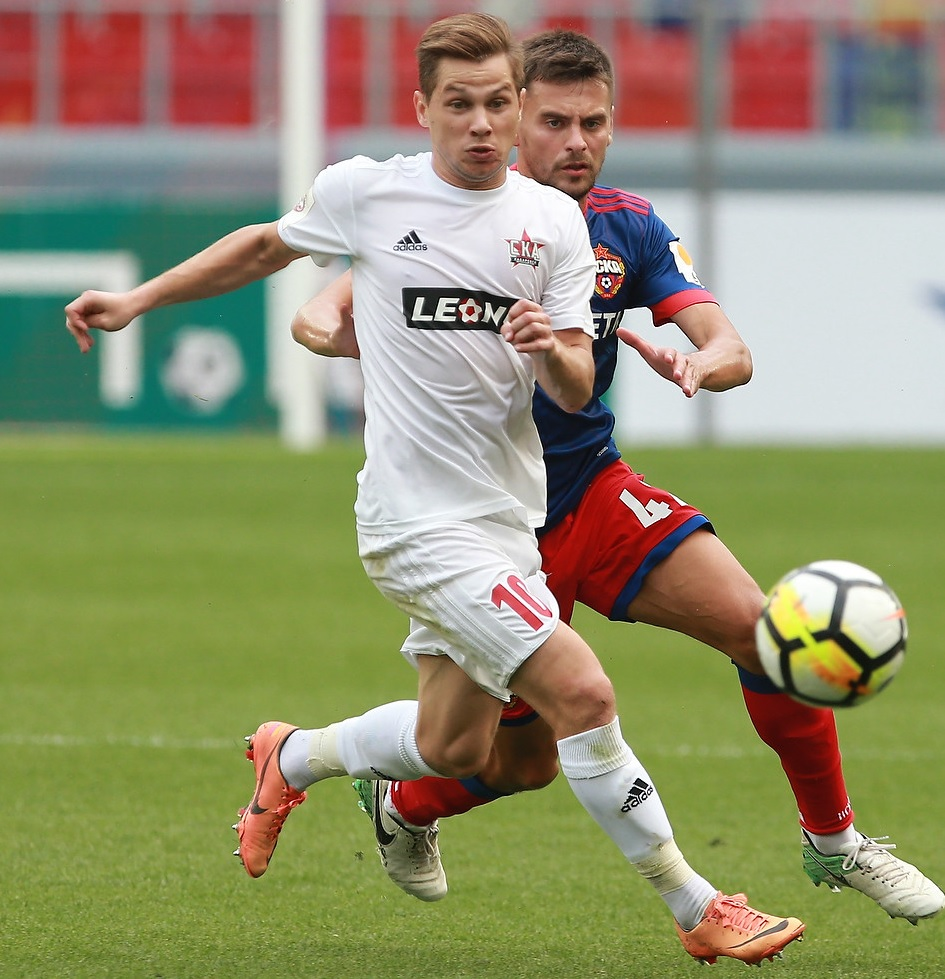
- Nikiforov with SKA-Khabarovsk in 2017

Personal information
- Full name: Vladislav Yuryevich Nikiforov
- Date of birth: 21 March 1989 (age 37)
- Place of birth: Vyazemsky, Russian SFSR
- Height: 1.66 m (5 ft 5 1/2 in)
- Positions: Midfielder; defender; forward

Youth career
- SKA-Energiya Khabarovsk

Senior career*
| Years | Team | Apps | (Gls) |
| 2006–2007 | SKA-Energiya Khabarovsk | 47 | (4) |
| 2008–2010 | Khimki | 27 | (0) |
| 2009–2010 | → SKA-Energiya Khabarovsk (loan) | 41 | (4) |
| 2011–2022 | SKA-Khabarovsk | 286 | (13) |
| 2021–2025 | SKA-Khabarovsk-2 | 78 | (6) |
| 2023–2025 | SKA-Khabarovsk | 0 | (0) |

International career^{‡}
| 2006 | Russia U-17 | 3 | (0) |
| 2008 | Russia U-19 | 5 | (1) |
| 2009 | Russia U-21 | 1 | (0) |
- * Club domestic league appearances and goals as of 1 November 2025 ‡ National team caps and goals as of 12 August 2009

Vladislav Yuryevich Nikiforov (Russian: Владислав Юрьевич Никифоров; born 21 March 1989) is a Russian footballer. He is versatile, he primarily plays as right midfielder, but can play on the left side as defender or winger.

== Club career ==
He made his Russian Premier League debut for Khimki on 15 March 2008 in a game against Amkar Perm.

== Career statistics ==
As of 4 March 2018

| Club | Season | League | | | Cup | | Continental | | Other | | Total | |
| Club | Season | Division | Apps | Goals | Apps | Goals | Apps | Goals | Apps | Goals | Apps | Goals |
|---|---|---|---|---|---|---|---|---|---|---|---|---|
| SKA-Khabarovsk | 2006 | FNL | 21 | 3 | 1 | 0 | – | | – | | 22 | 3 |
| SKA-Khabarovsk | 2007 | FNL | 26 | 1 | 1 | 0 | – | | – | | 27 | 1 |
| Khimki | 2008 | Russian Premier League | 19 | 0 | 1 | 1 | – | | – | | 20 | 1 |
| Khimki | 2009 | Russian Premier League | 8 | 0 | 1 | 0 | – | | – | | 9 | 0 |
| Khimki | Total | | 27 | 0 | 2 | 1 | 0 | 0 | 0 | 0 | 29 | 1 |
| SKA-Khabarovsk | 2009 | FNL | 11 | 0 | 0 | 0 | – | | – | | 11 | 0 |
| SKA-Khabarovsk | 2010 | FNL | 30 | 4 | 0 | 0 | – | | – | | 30 | 4 |
| SKA-Khabarovsk | 2011–12 | FNL | 41 | 5 | 1 | 0 | – | | – | | 42 | 5 |
| SKA-Khabarovsk | 2012–13 | FNL | 13 | 0 | 2 | 0 | – | | 2 (Note: Two appearances in promotion play-offs) | 0 | 17 | 0 |
| SKA-Khabarovsk | 2013–14 | FNL | 23 | 4 | 1 | 0 | – | | – | | 24 | 4 |
| SKA-Khabarovsk | 2014–15 | FNL | 27 | 0 | 1 | 0 | – | | – | | 28 | 0 |
| SKA-Khabarovsk | 2015–16 | FNL | 37 | 1 | 2 | 1 | – | | – | | 39 | 2 |
| SKA-Khabarovsk | 2016–17 | FNL | 30 | 3 | 3 | 1 | – | | 2 (Note: Two appearances in promotion play-offs) | 0 | 35 | 4 |
| SKA-Khabarovsk | 2017–18 | Russian Premier League | 16 | 0 | 2 | 0 | – | | – | | 18 | 0 |
| SKA-Khabarovsk | Total (2 spells) | | 275 | 21 | 14 | 2 | 0 | 0 | 4 | 0 | 293 | 23 |
| Career total | | | 302 | 21 | 16 | 3 | 0 | 0 | 4 | 0 | 322 | 24 |
