= Yuri Shpiryuk =

Russian footballer and coach

Personal information
- Full name: Yuri Yuryevich Shpiryuk
- Date of birth: 20 May 1970 (age 56)
- Place of birth: Khabarovsk, Russian SFSR
- Height: 1.65 m (5 ft 5 in)
- Positions: Forward; midfielder

Team information
- Current team: FC SKA-Khabarovsk (assistant coach)

Senior career*
Years	Team	Apps	(Gls)
1988–1991	FC SKA Khabarovsk	94	(14)
1992–1995	FC Okean Nakhodka	106	(26)
1995–1996	FC Luch Vladivostok	51	(6)
1997–1998	FC Samotlor-XXI Nizhnevartovsk	62	(18)
1999	FC Chkalovets Novosibirsk	26	(13)
2000	FC Chkalovets-Olimpik Novosibirsk	10	(1)
2001	FC Selenga Ulan-Ude	15	(5)
2002–2004	FC Smena Komsomolsk-na-Amure	70	(13)
2005–2006	FC Okean Nakhodka	47	(3)

Managerial career
- 2015–2016: FC SKA Khabarovsk (conditioning)
- 2017–2022: FC SKA-Khabarovsk (assistant)
- 2022–2024: FC SKA-Khabarovsk-2
- 2024–: FC SKA-Khabarovsk (assistant)
- * Club domestic league appearances and goals

Yuri Yuryevich Shpiryuk (Russian: Юрий Юрьевич Шпирюк; born 20 May 1970) is a Russian professional football coach and a former player. He is an assistant coach with FC SKA-Khabarovsk.

== Club career ==
He made his professional debut in the Soviet Second League in 1988 for FC SKA Khabarovsk.
