= Vladislav Soromytko =

Russian footballer

Personal information
- Full name: Vladislav Sergeyevich Soromytko
- Date of birth: 29 September 1994 (age 32)
- Place of birth: Khabarovsk, Russia
- Height: 1.90 m (6 ft 3 in)
- Position: Goalkeeper

Senior career*
Years	Team	Apps	(Gls)
2014–2016	FC Smena Komsomolsk-na-Amure	22	(0)
2016–2020	FC SKA-Khabarovsk	8	(0)
- * Club domestic league appearances and goals

Vladislav Sergeyevich Soromytko (Russian: Владислав Сергеевич Соромытько; born 29 September 1994) is a Russian former football goalkeeper.

== Club career ==
He made his debut in the Russian Professional Football League for FC Smena Komsomolsk-na-Amure on 25 April 2015 in a game against FC Tom-2 Tomsk.

He made his Russian Football National League debut for FC SKA-Khabarovsk on 4 November 2018 in a game against FC Krasnodar-2.

== Personal life ==
His older brother Ignat Soromytko is also a footballer.
