= Vasili Pletin =

Russian footballer

Personal information
- Full name: Vasili Vladimirovich Pletin
- Date of birth: 28 September 1992 (age 34)
- Place of birth: Khabarovsk, Russia
- Height: 1.77 m (5 ft 10 in)
- Position: Midfielder

Senior career*
Years	Team	Apps	(Gls)
2012–2013	FC Smena Komsomolsk-na-Amure	36	(4)
2014–2017	FC SKA-Khabarovsk	49	(3)
2017–2018	FC Smena Komsomolsk-na-Amure	15	(0)
2018–2019	FC TSK Simferopol	22	(4)
- * Club domestic league appearances and goals

Vasili Vladimirovich Pletin (Russian: Василий Владимирович Плетин; born 28 September 1992) is a Russian former football midfielder.

== Club career ==
He made his debut in the Russian Second Division for FC Smena Komsomolsk-na-Amure on 15 July 2012 in a game against FC Sibiryak Bratsk.

He made his Russian Football National League debut for FC SKA-Energiya Khabarovsk on 9 March 2014 in a game against PFC Spartak Nalchik.
