= Nemanja Tubić =

Serbian footballer

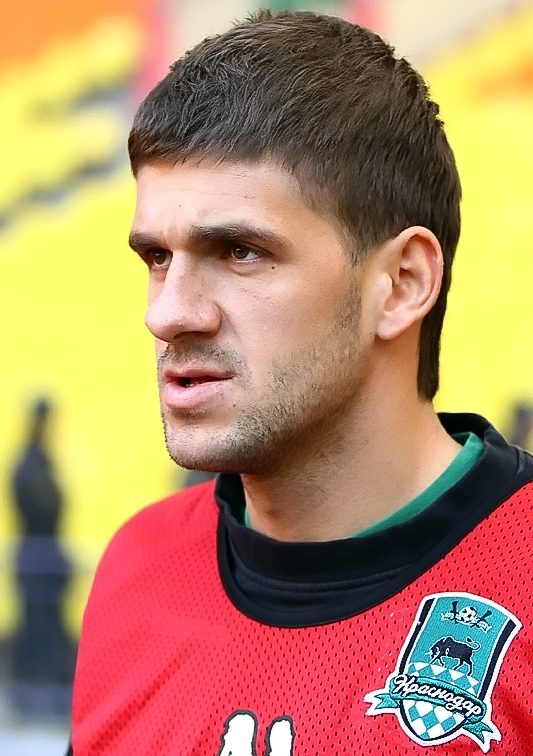
- Tubić with Krasnodar in 2011

Personal information
- Date of birth: 8 April 1984 (age 42)
- Place of birth: Belgrade, SFR Yugoslavia
- Height: 1.88 m (6 ft 2 in)
- Position: Centre-back

Youth career
- 1992–2002: Partizan

Senior career*
Years	Team	Apps	(Gls)
2002–2003	Partizan	0	(0)
2003	→ Radnički Stobex (loan)	11	(3)
2004–2008	Čukarički	86	(7)
2005	→ Radnički Obrenovac (loan)	15	(1)
2008	→ Genk (loan)	6	(0)
2009–2010	Karpaty Lviv	50	(1)
2011–2014	Krasnodar	60	(1)
2014	BATE Borisov	9	(0)
2015	Hajer Club	7	(0)
2016	Haugesund	12	(0)
2017	Napredak Kruševac	17	(1)
2018	SKA-Khabarovsk	3	(0)
- * Club domestic league appearances and goals

Nemanja Tubić (Serbian Cyrillic: Немања Тубић; born 8 April 1984) is a Serbian retired footballer who played as a centre-back.

== Career ==
Tubić came through the youth system of Partizan, but failed to break into the first team. He was instead loaned to Radnički Stobex during the 2002–03 season, as the club suffered relegation from the Second League of Serbia and Montenegro. In the 2004 winter transfer window, Tubić joined Čukarički. He played for four years at the club, except for six months on loan at Radnički Obrenovac (2005).

In January 2008, Tubić moved abroad and signed an initial six-month deal for Belgian side Genk, with a three-year option deal. He made six appearances for the club until the end of the 2007–08 season, before eventually returning to his homeland.

In early 2009, Tubić signed for Ukrainian club Karpaty Lviv, receiving the number 55 shirt in the process. He made 50 league appearances and scored once in two years. Subsequently, Tubić moved to Russian club Krasnodar in early 2011. He left them at the end of the 2013–14 season.

In August 2014, Tubić signed for Belarusian side BATE Borisov. He made his UEFA Champions League debut that year, as the club finished bottom of the table in Group H.

On 20 February 2018, Tubić signed for FC SKA-Khabarovsk until the end of the 2017–18 season, with SKA-Khabarovsk confirming his release on 15 May 2018.

== Honours ==
BATE Borisov

- Belarusian Premier League: 2014

== Career statistics ==
As of 4 March 2018

Club	Season	League			Cup		Continental		Other		Total	
Club	Season	Division	Apps	Goals	Apps	Goals	Apps	Goals	Apps	Goals	Apps	Goals
Radnički Stobex	2002–03	Second League of Serbia and Montenegro	11	3	0	0	–		–		11	3
Čukarički	2003–04	Second League of Serbia and Montenegro	1	0	0	0	–		–		1	0
Čukarički	2004–05	First League of Serbia and Montenegro	6	0	0	0	–		–		6	0
Radnički Obrenovac	2004–05	Serbian First League	15	1	0	0	–		–		15	1
Čukarički	2005–06	Serbian First League	35	5	0	0	–		–		35	5
Čukarički	2006–07	Serbian First League	31	1	0	0	–		–		31	1
Čukarički	2007–08	Serbian SuperLiga	13	1	0	0	–		–		13	1
Čukarički	Total (2 spells)		86	7	0	0	0	0	0	0	86	7
Genk	2007–08	Belgian First Division A	13	1	0	0	–		–		13	1
Karpaty Lviv	2008–09	Ukrainian Premier League	13	0	–		–		–		13	0
Karpaty Lviv	2009–10	Ukrainian Premier League	23	1	0	0	–		–		23	1
Karpaty Lviv	2010–11	Ukrainian Premier League	14	0	2	0	10	0	–		26	0
Karpaty Lviv	Total		50	1	2	0	10	0	0	0	62	1
Krasnodar	2011–12	Russian Premier League	35	1	2	0	–		–		37	1
Krasnodar	2012–13	Russian Premier League	16	0	1	0	–		–		17	0
Krasnodar	2013–14	Russian Premier League	9	0	1	0	–		–		10	0
Krasnodar	Total		60	1	4	0	0	0	0	0	64	1
BATE Borisov	2014	Belarusian Premier League	9	0	1	1	3	0	–		13	1
Hajer Club	2015–16	Saudi Professional League	7	0	–		–		1 (Note: One appearance in the Saudi Crown Prince Cup)	0	8	0
Haugesund	2016	Eliteserien	12	0	0	0	–		–		12	0
Napredak Kruševac	2016–17	Serbian SuperLiga	14	1	0	0	–		–		14	1
Napredak Kruševac	2017–18	Serbian SuperLiga	3	0	0	0	–		–		3	0
Napredak Kruševac	Total		17	1	0	0	0	0	0	0	17	1
SKA-Khabarovsk	2017–18	Russian Premier League	1	0	1	0	–		–		2	0
Career total			281	15	8	1	13	0	1	0	303	16
