= Aleksandr Maksimenko =

Aleksandr Maksimenko may refer to:

- Aleksandr Maksimenko (footballer, born 1996), Russian football player
- Aleksandr Maksimenko (footballer, born 1998), Russian football player
