= Ismail Ediyev =

Russian footballer

Personal information
- Full name: Ismail Ibragimovich Ediyev
- Date of birth: 16 February 1988 (age 38)
- Place of birth: Komsomolskoye, Russian SFSR
- Height: 1.85 m (6 ft 1 in)
- Position: Defender

Senior career*
| Years | Team | Apps | (Gls) |
| 2005–2013 | FC Terek Grozny | 16 | (1) |
| 2011–2012 | → FC Fakel Voronezh (loan) | 13 | (0) |
| 2012 | → FC Chernomorets Novorossiysk (loan) | 12 | (0) |
| 2013 | FC Metallurg-Kuzbass Novokuznetsk | 9 | (0) |
| 2013–2014 | FC Mordovia Saransk | 16 | (0) |
| 2014–2018 | FC SKA-Khabarovsk | 82 | (2) |
| 2018 | FC Rotor Volgograd | 16 | (1) |
| 2019–2020 | FC Tom Tomsk | 33 | (3) |
| 2020–2021 | FC Nizhny Novgorod | 17 | (0) |
| 2021–2022 | FC Kuban Krasnodar | 21 | (0) |
- * Club domestic league appearances and goals

Ismail Ibragimovich Ediyev (Russian: Исмаил Ибрагимович Эдиев; born 16 February 1988) is a Russian former professional footballer who played as a centre-back.

== Club career ==
He made his professional debut in the Russian Premier League for FC Terek Grozny on 6 November 2005 in a game against FC Lokomotiv Moscow.

== Career statistics ==
As of 4 March 2018

| Club | Season | League | | | Cup | | Continental | | Other | | Total | |
| Club | Season | Division | Apps | Goals | Apps | Goals | Apps | Goals | Apps | Goals | Apps | Goals |
|---|---|---|---|---|---|---|---|---|---|---|---|---|
| Terek Grozny | 2005 | Russian Premier League | 2 | 0 | 0 | 0 | – | | – | | 2 | 0 |
| Terek Grozny | 2006 | FNL | 4 | 0 | 0 | 0 | – | | – | | 4 | 0 |
| Terek Grozny | 2007 | FNL | 0 | 0 | 0 | 0 | – | | – | | 0 | 0 |
| Terek Grozny | 2008 | Russian Premier League | 0 | 0 | 0 | 0 | – | | – | | 0 | 0 |
| Terek Grozny | 2009 | Russian Premier League | 1 | 0 | 0 | 0 | – | | – | | 1 | 0 |
| Terek Grozny | 2010 | Russian Premier League | 9 | 1 | 0 | 0 | – | | – | | 9 | 1 |
| Terek Grozny | 2011–12 | Russian Premier League | 0 | 0 | 0 | 0 | – | | – | | 0 | 0 |
| Terek Grozny | Total | | 16 | 1 | 0 | 0 | 0 | 0 | 0 | 0 | 16 | 1 |
| Fakel Voronezh | 2011–12 | FNL | 13 | 0 | 2 | 0 | – | | – | | 15 | 0 |
| Chernomorets Novorossiysk | 2012–13 | PFL | 12 | 0 | 0 | 0 | – | | – | | 12 | 0 |
| Metallurg-Kuzbass Novokuznetsk | 2012–13 | FNL | 9 | 0 | – | | – | | – | | 9 | 0 |
| Mordovia Saransk | 2013–14 | FNL | 16 | 0 | 2 | 0 | – | | – | | 18 | 0 |
| SKA-Khabarovsk | 2014–15 | FNL | 14 | 0 | 0 | 0 | – | | – | | 14 | 0 |
| SKA-Khabarovsk | 2015–16 | FNL | 25 | 1 | 0 | 0 | – | | – | | 25 | 1 |
| SKA-Khabarovsk | 2016–17 | FNL | 23 | 1 | 2 | 0 | – | | 2 (Note: Two appearances in promotion play-offs) | 0 | 27 | 1 |
| SKA-Khabarovsk | 2017–18 | Russian Premier League | 16 | 0 | 1 | 0 | – | | – | | 17 | 0 |
| SKA-Khabarovsk | Total | | 78 | 2 | 3 | 0 | 0 | 0 | 2 | 0 | 83 | 2 |
| Career total | | | 144 | 3 | 7 | 0 | 0 | 0 | 2 | 0 | 153 | 3 |
