= Vitaliy Fedotov =

Ukrainian football midfielder

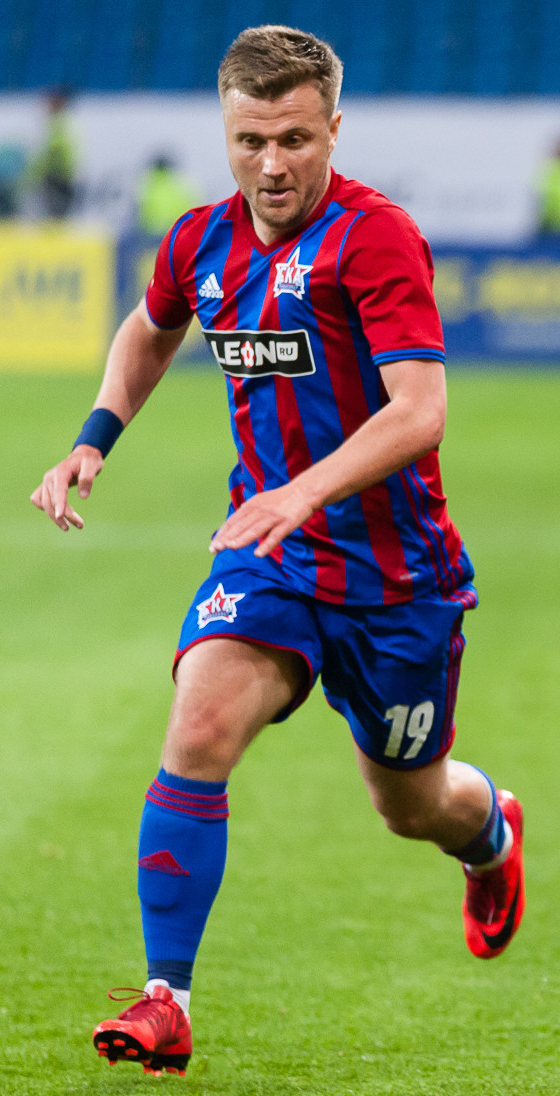
- Fedotov with SKA-Khabarovsk in 2018

Personal information
- Full name: Vitaliy Andriyovych Fedotov
- Date of birth: 16 July 1991 (age 35)
- Place of birth: Donetsk, Ukrainian SSR
- Height: 1.71 m (5 ft 7 1/2 in)
- Position: Midfielder

Youth career
- 2004–2008: Shakhtar Donetsk

Senior career*
Years	Team	Apps	(Gls)
2008–2012	Shakhtar Donetsk	0	(0)
2008	→ Shakhtar-3 Donetsk	2	(1)
2011–2012	→ Illichivets Mariupol (loan)	30	(1)
2012–2014	Illichivets Mariupol	55	(6)
2014–2015	Metalurh Donetsk	16	(0)
2015–2016	Arsenal Tula	32	(6)
2017	Riga	2	(0)
2017–2018	SKA-Khabarovsk	32	(3)
2019	Avangard Kursk	8	(2)
2020	Odra Opole	1	(0)
2020	PFK Yalta		
2020–2022	Rubin Yalta		
2022–2026	FC Türk Kelsterbach		

International career
2009	Ukraine U17	1	(1)
2009	Ukraine U18	8	(1)
2009–2010	Ukraine U19	6	(0)
2010	Ukraine U20	3	(1)
2011–2012	Ukraine U21	14	(1)
- * Club domestic league appearances and goals as of 16 July 2024

Vitaliy Fedotov (Ukrainian: Віталій Андрійович Федотов, born 16 July 1991) is a Ukrainian professional footballer who plays as a midfielder for German club FC Türk Kelsterbach.

== Career ==
Fedotov played for various Ukrainian national youth football teams and was also a member of the Ukraine under-20 team. He scored a goal against the Kazakhstan national under-20 football team on 4 September 2010.

== Career statistics ==
As of 4 March 2018

Club	Season	League			Cup		Continental		Total	
Club	Season	Division	Apps	Goals	Apps	Goals	Apps	Goals	Apps	Goals
Shakhtar-3 Donetsk	2007–08	Ukrainian Second League	2	1	—		—		2	1
Shakhtar Donetsk	2008–09	Ukrainian Premier League	0	0	0	0	0	0	0	0
Shakhtar Donetsk	2009–10	Ukrainian Premier League	0	0	0	0	0	0	0	0
Shakhtar Donetsk	2010–11	Ukrainian Premier League	0	0	0	0	0	0	0	0
Shakhtar Donetsk	Total		0	0	0	0	0	0	0	0
Illichivets Mariupol	2010–11	Ukrainian Premier League	8	0	0	0	—		8	0
Illichivets Mariupol	2011–12	Ukrainian Premier League	22	1	1	0	—		23	1
Illichivets Mariupol	2012–13	Ukrainian Premier League	30	5	2	0	—		32	5
Illichivets Mariupol	2013–14	Ukrainian Premier League	20	1	1	0	—		21	1
Illichivets Mariupol	2014–15	Ukrainian Premier League	5	0	0	0	—		5	0
Illichivets Mariupol	Total		85	7	4	0	0	0	89	7
Metalurh Donetsk	2014–15	Ukrainian Premier League	16	0	—		—		16	0
Arsenal Tula	2015–16	FNL	32	6	1	0	—		33	6
Riga	2017	Latvian Higher League	2	0	0	0	—		2	0
SKA-Khabarovsk	2017–18	Russian Premier League	12	3	2	0	—		14	3
Career total			149	17	7	0	0	0	156	17
