= Andrei Gefel =

Russian footballer

Personal information
- Full name: Andrei Vladimirovich Gefel
- Date of birth: 24 June 1979 (age 47)
- Height: 1.74 m (5 ft 9 in)
- Position: Midfielder

Senior career*
Years	Team	Apps	(Gls)
1997	FC Irtysh Omsk	0	(0)
1999	FC Irtysh Omsk	12	(1)
2000	FC Spartak Kurgan	11	(1)
2000–2004	FC Irtysh Omsk	79	(8)
2005–2007	FC Ekibastuzets	67	(10)
2008	FC Esil Bogatyr	21	(2)
2009	FC Amur Blagoveshchensk	16	(4)
2010	FC Smena Komsomolsk-na-Amure	27	(7)
2012	FC Smena Komsomolsk-na-Amure	5	(0)
2012	FC Syzran-2003	5	(0)
- * Club domestic league appearances and goals

Andrei Vladimirovich Gefel (Russian: Андрей Владимирович Гефель; born 24 June 1979) is a former Russian professional footballer.
