= Aleksandr Cherevko =

Russian footballer

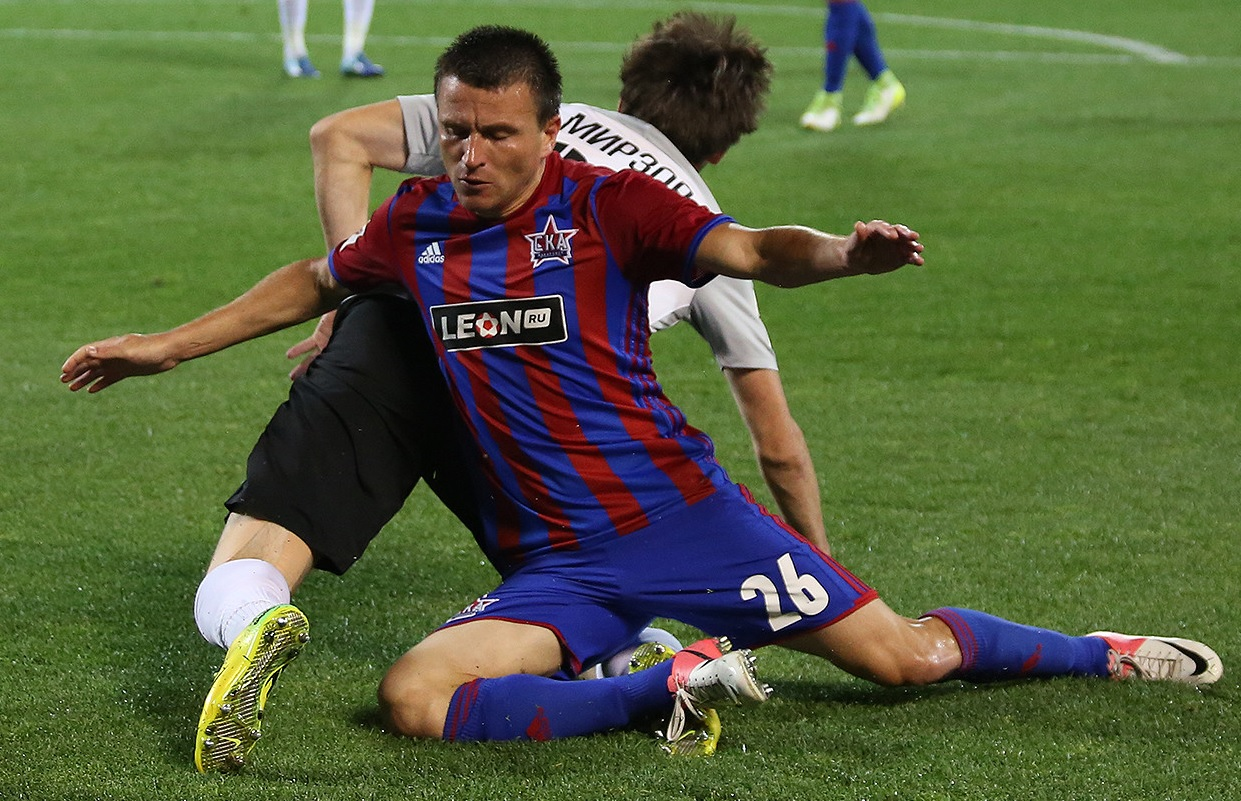
- Cherevko with SKA-Khabarovsk in 2017

Personal information
- Full name: Aleksandr Petrovich Cherevko
- Date of birth: 28 November 1987 (age 38)
- Place of birth: Novofedorivka, Ukrainian SSR
- Height: 1.65 m (5 ft 5 in)
- Positions: Defender; midfielder

Youth career
- 2000–2005: FC Lokomotiv Moscow

Senior career*
| Years | Team | Apps | (Gls) |
| 2005–2009 | FC Lokomotiv Moscow | 0 | (0) |
| 2007 | → FC Dynamo St. Petersburg (loan) | 13 | (3) |
| 2008–2009 | → FC Nizhny Novgorod (loan) | 63 | (4) |
| 2010–2012 | FC Nizhny Novgorod | 53 | (4) |
| 2012–2016 | FC Tom Tomsk | 74 | (0) |
| 2016–2019 | FC SKA-Khabarovsk | 63 | (1) |
| 2019–2020 | FC Fakel Voronezh | 10 | (0) |

International career
| 2004 | Russia U17 | 7 | (1) |
| 2006 | Russia U19 | 5 | (0) |
- * Club domestic league appearances and goals

Aleksandr Petrovich Cherevko (Russian: Александр Петрович Черевко; born 28 November 1987) is a former professional football player who played as right back. Born in Ukraine, he represented Russia at youth level.

== Club career ==
He made his Russian Premier League debut for FC Tom Tomsk on 19 October 2013 in a game against FC Krasnodar.

== Career statistics ==
As of 4 March 2018

| Club | Season | League | | | Cup | | Continental | | Other | | Total | |
| Club | Season | Division | Apps | Goals | Apps | Goals | Apps | Goals | Apps | Goals | Apps | Goals |
|---|---|---|---|---|---|---|---|---|---|---|---|---|
| Lokomotiv Moscow | 2005 | Russian Premier League | 0 | 0 | 0 | 0 | 0 | 0 | – | | 0 | 0 |
| Lokomotiv Moscow | 2006 | Russian Premier League | 0 | 0 | 0 | 0 | 0 | 0 | – | | 0 | 0 |
| Lokomotiv Moscow | 2007 | Russian Premier League | 0 | 0 | 0 | 0 | – | | – | | 0 | 0 |
| Lokomotiv Moscow | Total | | 0 | 0 | 0 | 0 | 0 | 0 | 0 | 0 | 0 | 0 |
| Dynamo St. Petersburg | 2007 | PFL | 13 | 3 | – | | – | | – | | 13 | 3 |
| Nizhny Novgorod | 2008 | PFL | 30 | 4 | 1 | 0 | – | | – | | 31 | 4 |
| Nizhny Novgorod | 2009 | FNL | 33 | 0 | 2 | 0 | – | | – | | 35 | 0 |
| Nizhny Novgorod | 2010 | FNL | 27 | 1 | 1 | 0 | – | | – | | 28 | 1 |
| Nizhny Novgorod | 2011–12 | FNL | 26 | 3 | 0 | 0 | – | | 2 (Note: Two appearances in promotion play-offs) | 0 | 28 | 3 |
| Nizhny Novgorod | Total | | 116 | 8 | 4 | 0 | 0 | 0 | 2 | 0 | 122 | 8 |
| Tom Tomsk | 2012–13 | FNL | 29 | 0 | 2 | 0 | – | | – | | 31 | 0 |
| Tom Tomsk | 2013–14 | Russian Premier League | 7 | 0 | 3 | 0 | – | | 1 (Note: One appearance in relegation play-offs) | 0 | 11 | 0 |
| Tom Tomsk | 2014–15 | FNL | 18 | 0 | 0 | 0 | – | | 1 (Note: One appearance in promotion play-offs) | 0 | 19 | 0 |
| Tom Tomsk | 2015–16 | FNL | 20 | 0 | 1 | 0 | – | | – | | 21 | 0 |
| Tom Tomsk | Total | | 74 | 0 | 6 | 0 | 0 | 0 | 2 | 0 | 82 | 0 |
| SKA-Khabarovsk | 2016–17 | FNL | 32 | 1 | 3 | 0 | – | | 2 (Note: Two appearances in promotion play-offs) | 0 | 37 | 1 |
| SKA-Khabarovsk | 2017–18 | Russian Premier League | 11 | 0 | 2 | 0 | – | | – | | 13 | 0 |
| SKA-Khabarovsk | Total | | 43 | 1 | 5 | 0 | 0 | 0 | 2 | 0 | 50 | 1 |
| Career total | | | 246 | 12 | 15 | 0 | 0 | 0 | 6 | 0 | 267 | 12 |
