= Marat Khoziyev =

Russian footballer and official

Personal information
- Full name: Marat Auzbiyevich Khoziyev
- Date of birth: 21 March 1982 (age 44)
- Height: 1.76 m (5 ft 9 1/2 in)
- Position: Midfielder

Team information
- Current team: FC SKA-Khabarovsk-2 (manager)

Youth career
- Yunost Vladikavkaz

Senior career*
Years	Team	Apps	(Gls)
2000–2001	FC Lada Togliatti	1	(0)
2002	FC Krasnoznamensk	18	(0)
2003–2004	FC Don Novomoskovsk	30	(6)
2005–2006	FC Mashuk-KMV Pyatigorsk	52	(7)
2007–2008	FC Avtodor Vladikavkaz	36	(4)
2009	FC Mashuk-KMV Pyatigorsk	12	(0)
2010	FC Beslan-FAYUR Beslan	18	(0)

Managerial career
- 2019–2020: FC Spartak Vladikavkaz (administrator)
- 2024–: FC SKA-Khabarovsk-2
- * Club domestic league appearances and goals

Marat Auzbiyevich Khoziyev (Russian: Марат Аузбиевич Хозиев; born 21 March 1982) is a Russian professional football coach and a former player who is the manager of FC SKA-Khabarovsk-2.

== Club career ==
He played in the Russian Football National League for FC Lada Togliatti in 2001.
