= Aleksei Poddubskiy =

Russian footballer and manager

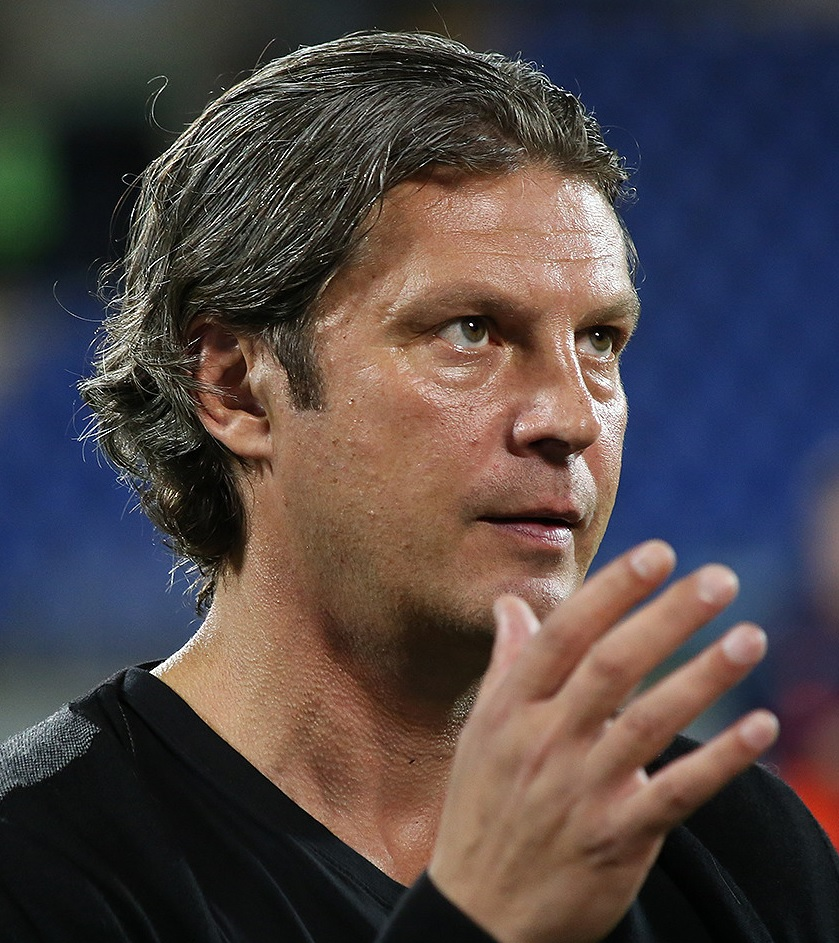
- Poddubskiy coaching SKA-Khabarovsk in 2017

Personal information
- Full name: Aleksei Nikolayevich Poddubskiy
- Date of birth: 13 June 1972 (age 54)
- Place of birth: Khabarovsk, Russian SFSR
- Height: 1.76 m (5 ft 9 in)
- Positions: Midfielder; defender

Youth career
- FC SKA-Khabarovsk

Senior career*
Years	Team	Apps	(Gls)
1988–1991	FC SKA-Khabarovsk	84	(5)
1992	PFC CSKA Moscow	11	(0)
1993–1995	FC Okean Nakhodka	81	(10)
1995–2007	FC SKA-Khabarovsk	367	(52)

Managerial career
- 2013–2017: FC SKA-Khabarovsk (assistant)
- 2015: FC SKA-Khabarovsk (caretaker)
- 2017: FC SKA-Khabarovsk
- 2017–2019: FC SKA-Khabarovsk (director of sports)
- 2019–2020: FC SKA-Khabarovsk
- 2021–2022: FC SKA-Khabarovsk-2
- 2022: FC SKA-Khabarovsk
- 2022: FC Novosibirsk
- 2024: FC SKA-Khabarovsk (assistant)
- 2024–2026: FC SKA-Khabarovsk
- * Club domestic league appearances and goals

Aleksei Nikolayevich Poddubskiy (Russian: Алексей Николаевич Поддубский; born 13 June 1972) is a Russian professional football coach and a former player.

== Club career ==
He made his professional debut in the Soviet Second League in 1988 for FC SKA Khabarovsk.

== Coaching career ==
On 19 October 2020, he resigned as manager of FC SKA-Khabarovsk.

== Honours ==
- Soviet Cup finalist: 1992.
- Russian Cup finalist: 1993 (played in the early stages of the 1992–93 tournament for PFC CSKA Moscow).
