= Alejandro Barbaro =

Argentine footballer

Personal information
- Full name: Alejandro Brian Barbaro
- Date of birth: 20 January 1992 (age 34)
- Place of birth: Lomas de Zamora, Argentina
- Height: 1.82 m (6 ft 0 in)
- Position: Winger

Team information
- Current team: Anagennisi Karditsa

Youth career
- Banfield

Senior career*
| Years | Team | Apps | (Gls) |
| 2011–2013 | Banfield | 32 | (1) |
| 2013–2014 | All Boys | 21 | (0) |
| 2014–2015 | San Lorenzo | 1 | (0) |
| 2015–2016 | Nacional | 16 | (2) |
| 2016–2017 | Apollon Limassol | 9 | (0) |
| 2017 | → Karmiotissa (loan) | 17 | (5) |
| 2017–2018 | SKA-Khabarovsk | 3 | (0) |
| 2018–2019 | Independiente Medellín | 3 | (0) |
| 2019–2021 | Aris Limassol | 17 | (5) |
| 2021–2022 | Deportivo Pasto | 11 | (0) |
| 2022 | Once Caldas | 13 | (0) |
| 2023–2024 | Ilioupoli | 14 | (2) |
| 2024– | Anagennisi Karditsa | | |

International career
| 2009 | Argentina U17 | 3 | (0) |
| 2012 | Argentina U20 | 2 | (0) |
- * Club domestic league appearances and goals as of 27 September 2024

Alejandro Brian Barbaro (born 20 January 1992) is an Argentine professional footballer who plays as a right winger for Greek club Anagennisi Karditsa.

== Career ==
Born in Lomas de Zamora, Buenos Aires, Barbaro finished his formation with Banfield. He made his first team – and Primera División – debut on 18 February 2011, coming on as a second-half substitute for Diego de Souza in a 1–1 home draw against Colón.

Barbaro scored his first professional goal on 29 April 2011, netting his team's third in a 4–3 home loss against Quilmes. He would subsequently feature sparingly for the side during his spell, suffering relegation in 2012.

Barbaro joined All Boys in June 2013, after agreeing to a one-year deal. The following 24 June he left the side at the expiration of his contract, and signed an 18-month deal with San Lorenzo on 15 August 2014.

After being rarely used, Barbaro moved abroad for the first time in his career, joining Nacional in Uruguay after cutting ties with San Lorenzo. On 8 July 2016 he switched teams and countries again, after signing for Apollon Limassol.

Barbaro was loaned to fellow Cypriot First Division side Karmiotissa FC in January 2017, until June. On 11 September of that year, Barbaro joined the Russian Premier League club FC SKA-Khabarovsk. After playing only four games for SKA-Khabarovsk Barbaro was released by the club.

On 2 August 2019, Barbaro joined Aris Limassol FC in Cyprus.

== Career statistics ==
As of 8 December 2017

| Club | Season | League | | | Cup | | Continental | | Other | | Total | |
| Club | Season | Division | Apps | Goals | Apps | Goals | Apps | Goals | Apps | Goals | Apps | Goals |
|---|---|---|---|---|---|---|---|---|---|---|---|---|
| Banfield | 2010–11 | Primera División | 7 | 1 | 0 | 0 | — | | — | | 7 | 1 |
| Banfield | 2011–12 | Primera División | 17 | 0 | 2 | 1 | — | | — | | 19 | 1 |
| Banfield | 2012–13 | Primera B Nacional | 8 | 0 | 2 | 0 | — | | — | | 10 | 0 |
| Banfield | Total | | 32 | 1 | 4 | 1 | — | | — | | 36 | 2 |
| All Boys | 2013–14 | Primera División | 21 | 0 | 1 | 0 | — | | — | | 22 | 0 |
| San Lorenzo | 2015 | Primera División | 1 | 0 | 0 | 0 | 1 (Note: Appearance(s) in Copa Libertadores) | 0 | — | | 2 | 0 |
| Nacional | 2015–16 | Primera División | 16 | 2 | 0 | 0 | 2 | 0 | — | | 18 | 2 |
| Apollon Limassol | 2016–17 | Cypriot First Division | 9 | 0 | 0 | 0 | 1 (Note: Appearance(s) in UEFA Europa League) | 0 | 1 (Note: Appearance(s) in Cypriot Super Cup) | 0 | 11 | 0 |
| Karmiotissa (loan) | 2016–17 | Cypriot First Division | 17 | 5 | 1 | 0 | — | | — | | 18 | 5 |
| SKA-Khabarovsk | 2017–18 | Russian Premier League | 3 | 0 | 1 | 0 | — | | — | | 4 | 0 |
| Career total | | | 99 | 8 | 7 | 1 | 4 | 0 | 1 | 0 | 111 | 9 |

== Honours ==
Apollon Limassol

- Cypriot Super Cup: 2016
