= Giorgi Navalovski =

Georgian footballer (born 1986)

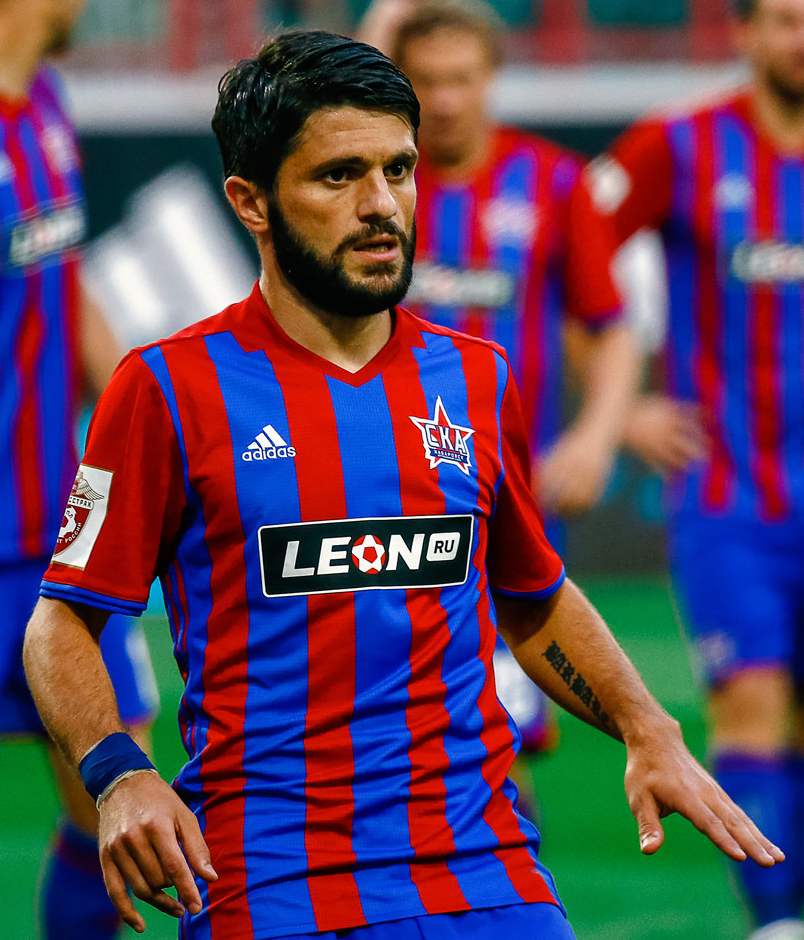
- With SKA-Khabarovsk in 2017

Personal information
- Date of birth: 28 June 1986 (age 40)
- Place of birth: Tbilisi, Georgian SSR, Soviet Union
- Height: 1.70 m (5 ft 7 in)
- Position: Left-back

Youth career
- 2003–2005: Dinamo Tbilisi

Senior career*
Years	Team	Apps	(Gls)
2004–2006	Dinamo Tbilisi	32	(0)
2007	Olimpi Rustavi	25	(0)
2008–2010	Anzhi Makhachkala	50	(0)
2010	→ Inter Baku (loan)	13	(1)
2010–2012	Volga Nizhny Novgorod	14	(0)
2011–2012	→ Khimki (loan)	33	(0)
2012–2013	Metallurg-Kuzbass Novokuznetsk	10	(0)
2013–2014	SKA-Energiya Khabarovsk	41	(1)
2014–2015	Tosno	26	(1)
2015	Dila Gori	13	(2)
2016	SKA-Energiya Khabarovsk	12	(0)
2016	Veria	7	(0)
2017	Neftchi Baku	13	(0)
2017–2018	SKA-Khabarovsk	22	(0)
2018	Dinamo Minsk	8	(0)
2019–2022	Dinamo Batumi	75	(1)

International career
2005–2007	Georgia U21	12	(0)
2008–2020	Georgia	41	(0)
- * Club domestic league appearances and goals

Giorgi Navalovski (Georgian: გიორგი ნავალოვსკი, romanized: giorgi navalovsk'i, pronounced [ɡioɾɡi navalofskʼi]; born 28 June 1986) is a retired Georgian footballer.

Dubbed as the Georgian Gattuso for physical similarities with the Serie A star, during his 18-year-long career Navalovski played as a left back for several clubs in five countries and the national team.

== Career ==
=== Club career ===
Navalovski's first steps in football started at Avaza school, followed by 35th football school, where he drew attention from Dinamo Tbilisi scouts. First he joined the reserve team of this Georgian top club and shortly under Kakha Tskhadadze made his debut in Umaglesi Liga. In this year he won the first champion's title with Dinamo.

After one year at Olimpi Rustavi, he spent next seven seasons abroad. In June 2015, he joined Dila Gori, which had become the league champion a month earlier. In July he took part in both Champions League qualifying matches against Partizan.

Navalovski signed a contract with Veria on 29 June 2016.

On 27 December 2016, Navalovski signed for Neftchi Baku, terminating his contract by mutual consent on 20 July 2017.

On 26 July 2017, Navalovski signed for Russian Premier League side SKA-Khabarovsk for his third stint with the club.

In the summer of 2018 he moved to Minsk, where he remained for six months.

Early next year Navalovski returned to Georgia to sign for Dinamo Batumi. He was a regular member of the team for four full seasons, once winning the league and three times the silver medals. His retirement was announced in late 2022.

=== International career ===
Navalovski made his debut for the national team in a 1–1 draw against Estonia on 27 May 2008. After participating in another friendly game against Portugal four days later, he did not play again until 2015. Navalovski made contribution to Georgia's successful UEFA Nations League campaign in 2018. Overall, he played 41 matches and retired in 2021.

=== Career statistics ===
As of 8 December 2017

Club	Season	League			Cup		Continental		Other		Total	
Club	Season	Division	Apps	Goals	Apps	Goals	Apps	Goals	Apps	Goals	Apps	Goals
FC Dinamo Tbilisi	2004–05	Umaglesi Liga	9	0	0	0	0	0	–		9	0
FC Dinamo Tbilisi	2005–06	Umaglesi Liga	13	0	0	0	1	0	–		14	0
FC Dinamo Tbilisi	2006–07	Umaglesi Liga	10	0	0	0	1	0	–		11	0
FC Dinamo Tbilisi	Total		32	0	0	0	2	0	0	0	34	0
FC Olimpi Rustavi	2006–07	Umaglesi Liga	12	0	0	0	–		–		12	0
FC Olimpi Rustavi	2007–08	Umaglesi Liga	13	0	0	0	2	0	–		15	0
FC Olimpi Rustavi	Total		25	0	0	0	2	0	0	0	27	0
FC Anzhi Makhachkala	2008	First Division	26	0	1	0	–		–		27	0
FC Anzhi Makhachkala	2009	First Division	24	0	1	0	–		–		25	0
FC Anzhi Makhachkala	Total		50	0	2	0	0	0	0	0	52	0
FC Inter Baku	2009–10	Premyer Liqası	13	1	0	0	–		–		13	1
FC Volga Nizhny Novgorod	2010	First Division	14	0	1	0	–		–		15	0
FC Khimki	2011–12	National League	33	0	2	1	–		–		35	1
FC Metallurg-Kuzbass Novokuznetsk	2012–13	National League	10	0	0	0	–		–		10	0
FC SKA-Energia Khabarovsk	2012–13	National League	11	0	0	0	–		1 (Note: One appearance in promotion play-offs)	0	12	0
FC SKA-Energia Khabarovsk	2013–14	National League	30	1	1	0	–		–		31	1
FC Tosno	2014–15	National League	26	1	0	0	–		–		26	1
FC Dila Gori	2015–16	Umaglesi Liga	13	2	2	0	2	0	–		17	2
FC SKA-Energia Khabarovsk	2015–16	National League	12	0	0	0	–		–		12	0
Veria	2016–17	Super League Greece	7	0	1	0	–		–		8	0
Neftçi PFK	2016–17	Premyer Liqası	13	0	2	0	–		–		15	0
FC SKA-Khabarovsk	2017–18	Premier Liga	16	0	1	1	–		–		17	1
FC SKA-Khabarovsk	Total (3 spells)		69	1	2	1	0	0	1	0	72	2
Career total			305	5	12	2	6	0	1	0	324	7

== Honours ==
Azerbaijan Premier League

- Winner (1): 2009/2010

Erovnuli Liga

- Winner (2): 2004/2005, 2021
- Runner-up (3): 2019, 2020, 2022

Russian First League

- Winner (1): 2009
- Runner-up (1): 2010

Georgian Super Cup

- Winner (2): 2005/2006, 2022
- Runner-up (2): 2007/2008, 2015/2016

== Personal information ==
Navalovski is married with two children.

The Navalovski family comes from Poland. After Giorgi's great-grandfather moved to Georgia, his descendants settled in Tbilisi and Telavi.
