= Maksim Kazankov =

Russian professional football player (born 1987)

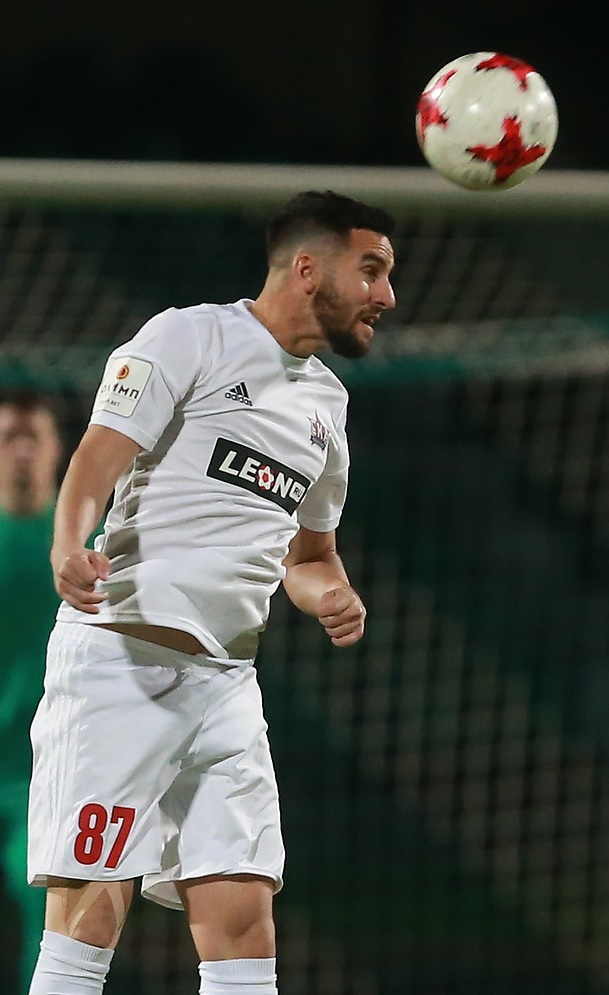
- Kazankov with SKA-Khabarovsk in 2017

Personal information
- Full name: Maksim Sergeyevich Kazankov
- Date of birth: 20 March 1987 (age 39)
- Place of birth: Ashgabat, Turkmen SSR, USSR
- Height: 1.70 m (5 ft 7 in)
- Position: Midfielder

Senior career*
| Years | Team | Apps | (Gls) |
| 2005 | Nisa Aşgabat | | |
| 2006 | Köpetdag Aşgabat | | |
| 2006–2008 | FC Aşgabat | | |
| 2008–2009 | FC Gazovik Orenburg | 43 | (5) |
| 2010 | FC Dynamo Saint Petersburg | 2 | (0) |
| 2010 | FC Olimp Fryazino | | |
| 2010 | FC Torpedo-ZIL Moscow | 11 | (1) |
| 2011 | FC Sokol Saratov | 22 | (3) |
| 2012 | Lokomotiv Tashkent FK | 21 | (2) |
| 2013 | FC Olimp Fryazino | | |
| 2014 | FC Zenit-Izhevsk | 9 | (1) |
| 2014 | FC Domodedovo Moscow | 18 | (10) |
| 2015 | FC Saturn Ramenskoye | 10 | (3) |
| 2015–2016 | FC Luch-Energiya Vladivostok | 32 | (2) |
| 2016–2019 | FC SKA-Khabarovsk | 79 | (15) |
| 2019–2020 | FC Tom Tomsk | 43 | (8) |
| 2021–2022 | FC Tyumen | 27 | (10) |
| 2022 | FC Spartak Kostroma | 7 | (0) |
| 2022–2023 | FC Sakhalinets Moscow | 1 | (0) |
- * Club domestic league appearances and goals as of 10 June 2023

Maksim Sergeyevich Kazankov (Russian: Максим Серге́евич Казанков; born 20 March 1987) is a Russian professional football player. He plays as an attacking midfielder or right midfielder. He also holds Turkmenistani citizenship.

== Club career ==
Born in Ashgabat, Turkmen SSR, Soviet Union. His father Sergey Kazankov is also a former Soviet footballer. His father is Russian, mother is Azerbaijani.

Kazankov played for FC Aşgabat from 2006 year.

He played for various Russian teams: FC Gazovik Orenburg (2008–2009), FC Dynamo Saint Petersburg (2010), Torpedo-ZIL (2010, 2 circle), FC Sokol Saratov (2011).

In February 2012 Kazankov moved to the Uzbek League Lokomotiv Tashkent FK. In March, made his debut in the match against FC Shurtan Guzar, playing 55 minutes. In the following rounds entrenched in the main part of the club. By the end of the season spent 21 games and scored two goals. Became the bronze medalist of Uzbekistan Championship 2012.

On 29 December 2012 it became known about the transition to FC Zenit Penza. But in the summer he left the club and joined the freshman composition of FC Domodedovo Moscow. In January 2015 on loan to FC Saturn Ramenskoye.

== National team ==
As a graduate of Turkmen football never played for the national team of Turkmenistan. On October 11, 2007, he was in the application for the 2010 World Cup qualifier against Cambodia (1: 0), but played on the bench

== Honours ==
Ýokary Liga:

- Champion: 2008

== Career statistics ==
As of match played 13 May 2018

| Club | Season | League | | | Cup | | Continental | | Other | | Total | |
| Club | Season | Division | Apps | Goals | Apps | Goals | Apps | Goals | Apps | Goals | Apps | Goals |
|---|---|---|---|---|---|---|---|---|---|---|---|---|
| Nisa Aşgabat | 2005 | Ýokary Liga | – | | | | | | | | | |
| Köpetdag Aşgabat | 2006 | Ýokary Liga | – | | | | | | | | | |
| Aşgabat | 2006 | Ýokary Liga | – | | | | | | | | | |
| Aşgabat | 2007 | Ýokary Liga | – | | | | | | | | | |
| Aşgabat | 2008 | Ýokary Liga | – | | | | | | | | | |
| Gazovik Orenburg | 2008 | PFL | 24 | 5 | 5 | 2 | – | | – | | 29 | 7 |
| Gazovik Orenburg | 2009 | PFL | 19 | 0 | 1 | 0 | – | | – | | 20 | 0 |
| Gazovik Orenburg | Total | | 43 | 5 | 6 | 2 | 0 | 0 | 0 | 0 | 49 | 7 |
| Dynamo St. Petersburg | 2010 | FNL | 2 | 0 | – | | – | | – | | 2 | 0 |
| Olimp Fryazino | 2010 | Amateur League | – | | | | | | | | | |
| Torpedo-ZIL Moscow | 2010 | PFL | 11 | 1 | – | | – | | – | | 11 | 1 |
| Sokol Saratov | 2011–12 | PFL | 22 | 3 | 1 | 0 | – | | – | | 23 | 3 |
| Lokomotiv Tashkent | 2012 | Uzbekistan Super League | 21 | 2 | 2 | 0 | – | | – | | 23 | 2 |
| Olimp Fryazino | 2013 | Amateur League | – | | | | | | | | | |
| Zenit-Izhevsk | 2013–14 | PFL | 9 | 1 | – | | – | | – | | 9 | 1 |
| Domodedovo Moscow | 2014–15 | PFL | 18 | 10 | 2 | 0 | – | | – | | 20 | 10 |
| Saturn Ramenskoye | 2014–15 | PFL | 10 | 3 | – | | – | | – | | 10 | 3 |
| Luch-Energiya Vladivostok | 2015–16 | FNL | 32 | 2 | 1 | 0 | – | | – | | 33 | 2 |
| SKA-Khabarovsk | 2016–17 | FNL | 29 | 6 | 2 | 0 | – | | 2 (Note: Two appearances in promotion play-offs) | 0 | 33 | 6 |
| SKA-Khabarovsk | 2017–18 | Russian Premier League | 22 | 0 | 2 | 1 | – | | – | | 24 | 1 |
| SKA-Khabarovsk | Total | | 51 | 6 | 4 | 1 | 0 | 0 | 2 | 0 | 57 | 7 |
| Career total | | | 219 | 33 | 16 | 3 | 0 | 0 | 2 | 0 | 237 | 36 |
