= Rinat Bilyaletdinov =

Russian footballer and coach

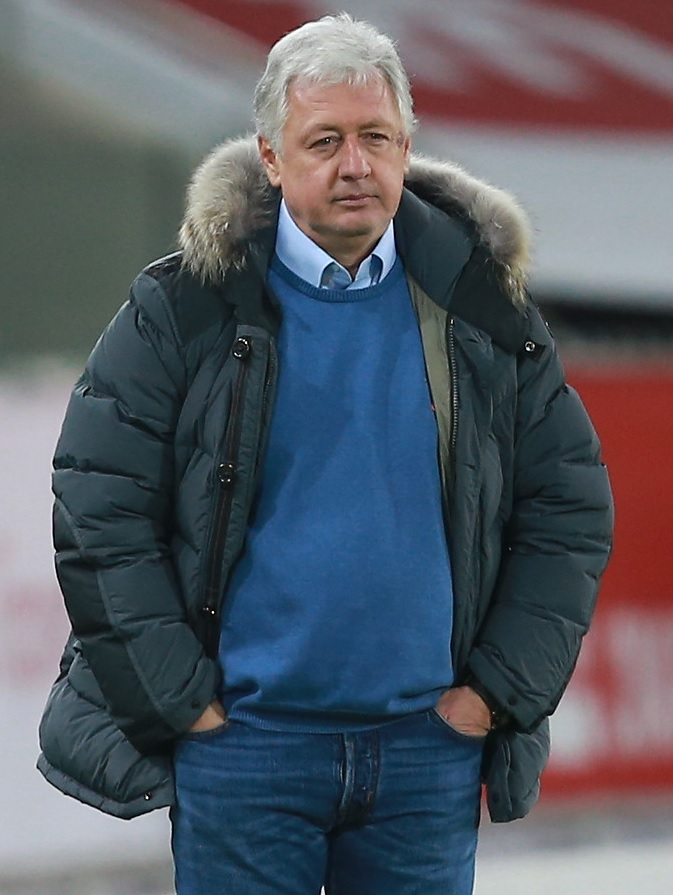
- Bilyaletdinov coaching SKA-Khabarovsk in 2018

Personal information
- Full name: Rinat Sayarovich Bilyaletdinov
- Date of birth: 17 August 1957 (age 69)
- Place of birth: Moscow, Russian SFSR
- Height: 1.78 m (5 ft 10 in)
- Position: Midfielder

Youth career
- Soyuz Moscow

Senior career*
Years	Team	Apps	(Gls)
1976	PFC CSKA Moscow	0	(0)
1978–1981	FC Spartak Kostroma	129	(13)
1982–1985	FC Lokomotiv Moscow	110	(9)
1986–1992	FC Shinnik Yaroslavl	239	(16)
1993	FC Orekhovo Orekhovo-Zuyevo	23	(2)
1994–1995	SK Unex Uničov		

Managerial career
- 1997: FC MEPhI Moscow
- 2004: Lokomotiv Moscow B (assistant)
- 2004–2009: Lokomotiv Moscow B
- 2007: Lokomotiv Moscow (caretaker)
- 2014–2015: Rubin Kazan
- 2018: SKA-Khabarovsk
- 2019–2020: Olimp Khimki
- 2020: Olimp-Dolgoprudny
- 2022: Nefis Kazan
- 2022–2023: Khimki (assistant)
- 2023: Khimki (caretaker)
- 2023: Khimki-M
- * Club domestic league appearances and goals

Rinat Sayarovich Bilyaletdinov (Tatar: Ринат Сәйяр улы Биләлетдинев, Russian: Ринат Саярович Билялетдинов; born 17 August 1957) is a Russian professional football coach and a former player. He is of Tatar descent.

== Coaching career ==
From 2014 to 2015, he managed the Russian Premier League club Rubin Kazan.

On 12 January 2018, he was signed by the last-place Russian Premier League club FC SKA-Khabarovsk. After 4 games at the helm in which SKA scored no goals and gained only 1 point, he left the club on 31 March 2018 by mutual consent.

On 3 April 2023, Bilyaletdinov was appointed caretaker manager by Russian Premier League club FC Khimki, with the club in relegation zone. He only served as caretaker in one game before Andrei Talalaev was hired as a new head coach.

== Personal life ==
He is the father of midfielder Diniyar Bilyaletdinov.
