= FC SKA-Khabarovsk-2 =

Russian football team based in Moscow

- Full name: Football Club SKA-Khabarovsk-2
- Founded: 1999
- Ground: Lenin Stadium
- Capacity: 15,200
- Chairman: Mikhail Gusev
- Manager: Marat Khoziyev
- League: Russian Second League, Division B, Group 3
- 2026: 12th
- Website: fcska.ru/teams/ska-2

FC SKA-Khabarovsk-2 (Russian: ФК «СКА-Хабаровск-2») is a Russian football team based in Khabarovsk. It is the reserves team for FC SKA-Khabarovsk.

== Club history ==
It played on amateur levels throughout its existence, before getting licensed for the third-tier Russian FNL 2 for the 2021–22 season.

== Current squad ==
As of 13 September 2026, according to the Second League website.

Note: Flags indicate national team as defined under FIFA eligibility rules; some limited exceptions apply. Players may hold more than one non-FIFA nationality.

No.	Pos.	Nation	Player
11	FW	RUS	Vladislav Bragin
22	MF	RUS	Andrey Putilov
23	FW	RUS	Stepan Burdakov
31	GK	RUS	Dmitry Nagayev
32	DF	RUS	Artemy Dmitrichenko
34	DF	RUS	Maksim Bulychev
35	GK	RUS	Aleksandr Ilyin
36	MF	RUS	Mikhail Glushkov
39	FW	RUS	Nikita Filippov
40	MF	RUS	Roman Prishchepov
42	DF	RUS	Vasily Pilyugin
45	DF	RUS	Daniil Kim
47	MF	RUS	Dmitry Bodnar
48	MF	RUS	Daniil Pletmintsev
49	FW	RUS	Artyom Khusainov
50	FW	RUS	Stepan Glotov
52	GK	RUS	Vladimir Bykov
53	GK	RUS	Bogdan Lyakhov
57	FW	RUS	Aleksandr Kuznetsov
59	FW	RUS	Dmitry Goncharuk
60	MF	RUS	German Parfyonov
63	DF	RUS	Daniil Borisov
65	GK	RUS	Andrey Boyko

No.	Pos.	Nation	Player
67	DF	RUS	Nikolay Kuralenya
68	DF	RUS	Kirill Golovnin
69	DF	RUS	Valentin Mokrov
72	DF	RUS	Daniil Kalmykov
73	FW	RUS	Ovik Galayan
74	MF	RUS	Nikita Dolin
75	DF	RUS	Ignat Pustovoy
76	DF	RUS	Aslan Goyayev
79	DF	RUS	Tamerlan Shachev
81	FW	RUS	Anton Novikov
82	DF	RUS	Demyan Ilyev
83	MF	RUS	Artur Sekerin
84	DF	RUS	Yaroslav Grebyonkin
86	MF	RUS	Kirill Mordasov
87	MF	RUS	Artur Kopylov
89	MF	RUS	Aleksey Kim
93	MF	RUS	Lev Ushakov
94	MF	RUS	Daniil Levadny
95	MF	RUS	Maksim Ulezko
96	MF	RUS	Aleksandr Maksimenko
97	FW	RUS	Vladislav Zykh
98	DF	RUS	Rostislav Zaretsky
