= Aleksandr Maksimenko (footballer, born 1996) =

Russian footballer

Personal information
- Full name: Aleksandr Dmitriyevich Maksimenko
- Date of birth: 22 March 1996 (age 30)
- Place of birth: Khabarovsk, Russia
- Height: 1.68 m (5 ft 6 in)
- Positions: Forward; midfielder

Team information
- Current team: SKA-Khabarovsk-2
- Number: 96

Youth career
- Dynamo Moscow

Senior career*
Years	Team	Apps	(Gls)
2013–2016	Dynamo Moscow	0	(0)
2016	→ Avangard Kursk (loan)	2	(0)
2016	→ Dynamo-2 Moscow	13	(0)
2017–2020	SKA-Khabarovsk	21	(1)
2019–2020	→ Novosibirsk (loan)	8	(0)
2021	Van	9	(0)
2021	Orsha	21	(2)
2022	SKA-Khabarovsk-2	32	(2)
2024–	SKA-Khabarovsk-2	48	(9)
2025	SKA-Khabarovsk	11	(1)

International career^{‡}
2012	Russia U16	4	(1)
2014	Russia U18	4	(1)
2014	Russia U19	1	(1)
- * Club domestic league appearances and goals as of 31 October 2026 ‡ National team caps and goals as of 11 October 2014

Aleksandr Dmitriyevich Maksimenko (Russian: Александр Дмитриевич Максименко; born 22 March 1996) is a Russian football player who plays for SKA-Khabarovsk-2.

== Club career ==
He made his debut in the Russian Professional Football League for Avangard Kursk on 10 April 2016 in a game against Tambov.

He made his debut in the Russian Premier League for SKA-Khabarovsk on 9 December 2017 in a game against Rubin Kazan and scored a goal on his debut that established the final score (1–3 loss for his club).

== Career statistics ==
As of 4 March 2018

Club	Season	League			Cup		Continental		Total	
Club	Season	Division	Apps	Goals	Apps	Goals	Apps	Goals	Apps	Goals
Dynamo Moscow	2013–14	Russian Premier League	0	0	0	0	–		0	0
Dynamo Moscow	2014–15	Russian Premier League	0	0	0	0	0	0	0	0
Dynamo Moscow	2015–16	Russian Premier League	0	0	0	0	–		0	0
Dynamo Moscow	Total		0	0	0	0	0	0	0	0
Avangard Kursk	2015–16	PFL	2	0	–		–		2	0
Dynamo-2 Moscow	2016–17	PFL	13	0	–		–		13	0
SKA-Khabarovsk	2017–18	Russian Premier League	1	1	0	0	–		1	1
Career total			16	1	0	0	0	0	16	1
