= Sergei Perednya =

Russian footballer and coach

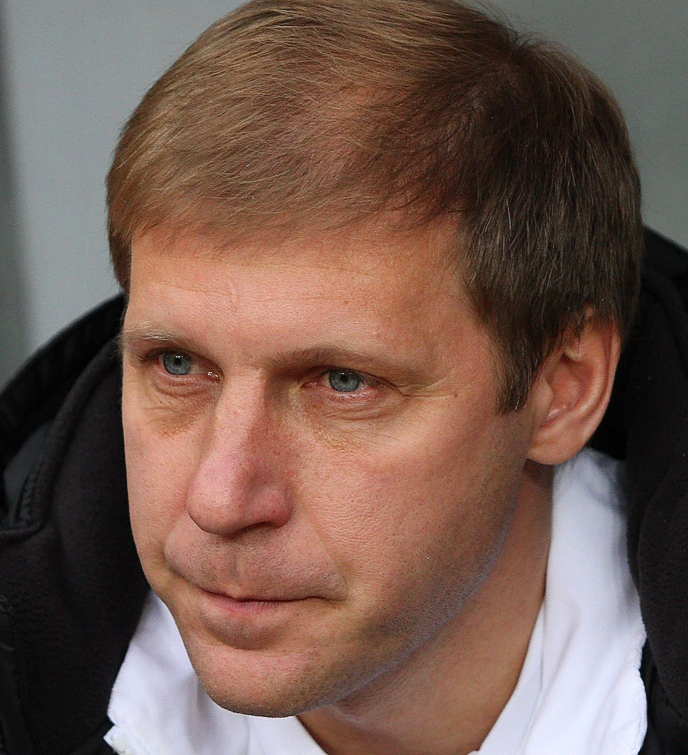
- Perednya with FC Tom Tomsk in 2011

Personal information
- Full name: Sergei Aleksandrovich Perednya
- Date of birth: 30 April 1972 (age 54)
- Place of birth: Nizhny Tagil, Soviet Union
- Height: 1.85 m (6 ft 1 in)
- Position: Forward

Team information
- Current team: FC KDV Tomsk (manager)

Youth career
- FC Uralets Nizhny Tagil

Senior career*
Years	Team	Apps	(Gls)
1989–1992	FC Uralets Nizhny Tagil	115	(25)
1993–1996	FC Uralmash Yekaterinburg	105	(16)
1997–1998	FC Lokomotiv Nizhny Novgorod	22	(0)
1998–1999	FC Lada Dimitrovgrad	39	(14)
2000–2004	FC Tom Tomsk	116	(28)
2004	FC Lukoil Chelyabinsk	13	(7)
2005–2006	FC Sodovik Sterlitamak	46	(22)
2006–2008	FC Volga Nizhny Novgorod	51	(16)

Managerial career
- 2009–2010: FC Volga Nizhny Novgorod (coach)
- 2010–2011: FC Khimik Dzerzhinsk
- 2011: FC Volga Nizhny Novgorod (assistant)
- 2011–2013: FC Tom Tomsk
- 2013–2015: FC Tambov
- 2015–2017: FC Luch-Energiya Vladivostok
- 2018: FC SKA-Khabarovsk
- 2019–2021: FC Tambov (U-19)
- 2022–2025: FC Khimik Dzerzhinsk
- 2026–: FC KDV Tomsk
- * Club domestic league appearances and goals

Sergei Aleksandrovich Perednya (Russian: Серге́й Александрович Передня, born 30 April 1972) is a Russian football coach and a former player who is the manager of FC KDV Tomsk.

== Coaching career ==
On 3 April 2018, he was appointed manager of the Russian Premier League club FC SKA-Khabarovsk, with club in the last place in the league and 11 points behind the non-relegation spot with 6 games remaining.
