= 2015–16 Russian Football National League =

Russian National Football League
- Season: 2015–16
- Promoted: Gazovik; Arsenal; Tom
- Relegated: Torpedo; Baikal; KAMAZ
- Matches: 380
- Goals: 901 (2.37 per match)
- Top goalscorer: Artyom Delkin (16 goals)
- Biggest away win: Baikal 0–6 Sibir
- Longest winning run: Volgar (8)
- Longest unbeaten run: Volgar (13); Arsenal (13)
- Longest winless run: KAMAZ (15)
- Longest losing run: Baikal (8)

The 2015–16 Russian National Football League was the 24th season of Russia's second-tier football league since the dissolution of the Soviet Union. The season began on 11 July 2015 and is due to end on 21 May 2016.

== Teams ==
Team locations

=== Stadiums, personnel and sponsorship ===
Team	Head coach	Captain	Kitmaker	Sponsor	Stadium	Capacity
Arsenal	(Russia) Sergei Pavlov	(Russia) Dmitry Aydov	Adidas		Arsenal, Tula	20,048
Baikal	(Russia) Dmitri Petrenko	(Russia) Andrei Mayboroda	Adidas		Trud, Irkutsk	17,800
Baltika	(Russia) Khazret Dyshekov	(Russia) Yevgeny Ovsiyenko	Nike		Baltika, Kaliningrad	14,660
Fakel	(Russia) Pavel Gusev	(Russia) Andrei Murnin	Adidas	TNS Energo	Tsentralnyi Profsoyuz, Voronezh	31,793
Gazovik	(Russia) Robert Yevdokimov	(Russia) Dmitri Andreev	Adidas	Gazprom	Gazovik, Orenburg	4,800
KAMAZ	(Russia) Vladimir Klontsak	(Russia) Irek Ganiyev	Adidas	Rubin	Neftekhimik, Nizhnekamsk	3,200
Luch-Energiya	(Russia) Sergei Perednya	(Russia) Roman Slavnov	Joma		Dynamo, Vladivostok	10,200
Shinnik	(Russia) Aleksandr Pobegalov	(Russia) Aleksandr Pavlenko	Jako		Shinnik, Yaroslavl	22,990
Sibir	(Russia) Boris Stukalov	(Moldova) Victor Golovatenco	Joma	Sibmost	Spartak, Novosibirsk	12,500
SKA-Energiya	(Russia) Aleksandr Grigoryan	(Russia) Igor Udaly	Adidas		Lenin, Khabarovsk	15,200
Sokol	(Russia) Valeri Burlachenko	(Russia) Aleksandr Degtyaryov	Adidas	ZMK	Lokomotiv, Saratov	15,000
Spartak-2	(Russia) Yevgeny Bushmanov	(Russia) Vladimir Obukhov	Nike	Lukoil	Spartak Academy, Moscow	2,700
Tom	(Russia) Valery Nepomnyashchy	(Czech Republic) Martin Jiránek	Adidas		Trud, Tomsk	10,000
Torpedo	(Russia) Valery Karpin	(Russia) Sergei Miroshnichenko	Adidas	RGMK	Yunost, Armavir	3,650
Tosno	(Ukraine) Dmytro Parfyonov	(Russia) Andrei Bochkov	Adidas	Fort Group	MSA Petrovsky, Saint Petersburg	2,809
Tyumen	(Russia) Aleksandr Ivchenko	(Russia) Khasan Mamtov	Umbro	Sibur	Geolog, Tyumen	13,057
Volga	(Russia) Andrei Talalayev	(Russia) Dmitri Polyanin	Adidas		Lokomotiv, Nizhny Novgorod	17,856
Volgar	(Russia) Yuri Gazzayev	(Russia) Aleksei Kolomiychenko	Adidas	Gazprom	Tsentralny, Astrakhan	17,500
Yenisey	(Russia) Omari Tetradze	(Russia) Yevgeni Kachan	2K Sport		Tsentralny, Krasnoyarsk	22,500
Zenit-2	(Russia) Vladislav Radimov	(Russia) Konstantin Lobov	Nike	Gazprom	MSA Petrovsky, Saint Petersburg	2,809

== League table ==
Pos	Team	Pld	W	D	L	GF	GA	GD	Pts	Promotion, qualification or relegation
1	Gazovik Orenburg (C, P)	38	26	8	4	61	20	+41	86	Promotion to Premier League
2	Arsenal Tula (P)	38	25	7	6	64	36	+28	82	Promotion to Premier League
3	Tom Tomsk (O, P)	38	22	8	8	58	35	+23	74	Qualification to Premier League play-offs
4	Volgar Astrakhan	38	17	12	9	57	37	+20	63	Qualification to Premier League play-offs
5	Spartak-2 Moscow	38	17	8	13	52	49	+3	59	
6	Fakel Voronezh	38	17	5	16	51	42	+9	56	
7	Tosno	38	17	4	17	57	53	+4	55	
8	Tyumen	38	15	9	14	44	45	−1	54	
9	Sokol Saratov	38	14	11	13	43	38	+5	53	
10	Volga Nizhny Novgorod (Note: On 15 June 2016, it was announced that FC Volga Nizhny Novgorod would be dissolved due to debt. According to league regulations, its place in the league would be taken by FC Baltika Kaliningrad, which would not be relegated.)	38	14	9	15	39	37	+2	51 (Note: Head-to-head record: Volga – Sibir 2–1, Sibir – Volga 1–2.)	Dissolved after the season
11	Sibir Novosibirsk	38	14	9	15	47	50	−3	51	
12	Shinnik Yaroslavl	38	13	11	14	50	49	+1	50 (Note: Head-to-head record: Zenit-2 – Shinnik 2–2, Shinnik – Zenit-2 4–0.)	
13	Zenit-2 Saint Petersburg	38	13	11	14	61	56	+5	50	
14	SKA-Energiya Khabarovsk	38	13	10	15	36	35	+1	49	
15	Luch-Energiya Vladivostok	38	12	9	17	31	46	−15	45	
16	Yenisey Krasnoyarsk (Note: On 4 June 2016, it was announced that FC Yenisey Krasnoyarsk would not be relegated as one of the teams that won one of the PFL zones, FC Smena Komsomolsk-na-Amure, refused to be promoted.)	38	12	8	18	36	49	−13	44	
17	Baltika Kaliningrad	38	11	11	16	37	47	−10	44	
18	Torpedo Armavir (R)	38	10	10	18	28	44	−16	40	Relegation to Professional Football League
19	Baikal Irkutsk (R)	38	8	2	28	29	73	−44	26	Relegation to Professional Football League
20	KAMAZ Naberezhnye Chelny (R)	38	6	6	26	20	60	−40	24	Relegation to Professional Football League

Source: Football National League (Russian), Soccerway
Rules for classification: 1) Points; 2) Matches won; 3) Head-to-head points; 4) Head-to-head matches won; 5) Head-to-head goal difference; 6) Head-to-head goals scored; 7) Head-to-head away goals; 8) Goal difference; 9) Goals scored; 10) Away goals scored.
(C) Champions; (O) Play-off winners; (P) Promoted; (R) Relegated

== Results ==
Home \ Away	ARS	BAI	BAL	FAK	GAZ	KAM	LUE	SHI	SIB	SKA	SOK	SP2	TOM	ARM	TOS	TYU	VNN	VOL	YEN	ZE2
Arsenal Tula		2–1	1–0	1–0	0–3	1–0	1–0	4–1	3–1	1–0	0–0	4–1	1–2	0–0	3–1	1–2	1–0	1–1	2–0	2–1
Baikal Irkutsk	0–2		1–0	0–2	0–3	2–1	0–1	0–2	0–6	2–3	0–3	1–2	1–2	1–2	0–2	0–0	1–0	3–2	1–0	2–1
Baltika Kaliningrad	1–4	3–1		1–1	2–1	1–2	3–0	0–3	3–1	1–0	0–0	1–1	0–3	0–1	1–3	1–1	0–1	2–1	0–0	3–1
Fakel Voronezh	3–1	3–2	1–0		1–2	4–1	2–0	3–1	2–1	0–1	1–0	2–2	1–3	2–0	1–3	3–0	1–2	0–1	0–1	0–1
Gazovik Orenburg	4–1	2–0	2–0	1–0		2–0	2–0	2–0	2–1	0–0	2–1	2–0	1–0	2–0	3–1	1–1	1–1	0–0	1–1	1–0
KAMAZ Naberezhnye Chelny	0–1	0–1	0–0	0–0	0–3		0–1	0–3	1–2	0–2	3–0	0–1	0–1	1–1	3–0	0–1	0–2	0–3	0–1	0–5
Luch-Energiya Vladivostok	0–0	1–0	2–2	1–0	1–1	2–1		1–1	0–3	1–0	2–3	1–1	0–3	0–1	0–1	1–0	2–0	1–1	2–2	0–0
Shinnik Yaroslavl	0–4	1–0	0–1	1–2	0–1	0–2	1–1		5–0	2–1	1–0	1–1	0–1	3–0	2–1	1–1	2–1	3–3	1–1	4–0
Sibir Novosibirsk	3–0	1–0	1–0	1–1	1–1	0–0	2–0	2–1		2–1	1–3	0–0	1–0	2–2	1–2	1–4	1–2	1–1	1–0	2–0
SKA-Khabarovsk	0–1	0–0	1–1	0–1	1–1	4–0	2–0	2–2	1–1		1–2	2–1	1–0	0–0	0–1	1–0	1–1	2–1	0–2	2–1
Sokol Saratov	1–1	3–0	1–1	3–2	0–2	0–0	0–1	0–1	2–0	2–0		2–2	1–2	0–0	3–2	0–1	2–0	2–1	1–0	0–0
Spartak-2 Moscow	1–2	2–0	0–1	1–3	1–0	4–0	2–1	2–0	3–0	1–0	4–3		0–1	1–0	3–1	1–1	1–0	1–0	2–0	1–2
Tom Tomsk	1–3	2–1	2–1	0–0	1–0	2–0	0–2	1–1	1–0	2–0	2–1	4–1		4–0	3–2	1–1	1–0	1–1	2–1	2–3
Armavir	1–3	0–2	1–2	1–2	3–0	0–0	2–0	0–2	2–0	0–2	0–0	1–2	1–1		0–0	2–1	1–0	1–0	2–3	2–0
Tosno	2–3	1–0	3–1	1–0	0–1	1–2	0–2	2–0	0–1	3–2	1–0	6–1	3–1	1–0		2–4	1–0	2–2	2–2	1–2
Tyumen	1–2	1–1	3–1	1–2	0–4	1–0	1–0	2–1	0–1	0–2	1–2	2–0	1–1	1–0	1–0		2–1	0–2	3–1	2–1
Volga Nizhny Novgorod	1–2	4–1	0–1	1–0	1–3	2–1	1–0	1–1	2–1	0–0	0–0	0–0	3–2	1–0	1–1	1–0		0–1	4–0	2–2
Volgar Astrakhan	1–1	3–1	1–0	2–1	0–1	3–0	4–1	4–0	1–1	0–1	2–0	2–1	1–1	2–0	1–0	1–1	2–1		1–1	0–3
Yenisey Krasnoyarsk	0–2	4–0	1–1	2–0	0–1	2–0	0–2	0–0	1–0	2–0	0–1	0–4	1–2	3–1	1–3	1–0	0–1	0–2		0–3
Zenit-2 St. Petersburg	2–2	4–3	3–1	2–4	1–2	1–2	3–1	2–2	3–3	0–0	1–1	3–0	0–0	0–0	2–1	4–2	1–1	2–3	1–2	

Source: Soccerway
Legend: Blue = home team win; Yellow = draw; Red = away team win.

== Statistics ==
=== Scoring ===
- First goal of the season: Denis Klopkov for Luch-Energiya against SKA-Energiya Khabarovsk (11 July 2015)

=== Top goalscorers ===
Rank	Player	Club	Goals
1	(Russia) Artyom Delkin	Gazovik	16
1	(Russia) Khasan Mamtov	Tyumen	16
1	(Russia) Maksim Zhitnev	Sibir	16
4	(Russia) Mikhail Biryukov	Fakel	13
5	(Russia) Kirill Pogrebnyak	Tom Tomsk	12
5	(Russia) Aleksandr Kutyin	Arsenal Tula/Tosno	12
5	(Russia) Vladimir Ilyin	Tosno	12
5	(Russia) Aleksandr Degtyaryov	Sokol	12

Last updated: 10 May 2016

=== Hat-tricks ===
Player	For	Against	Result	Date
(Russia) Denis Tkachuk	Zenit-2	Tom Tomsk	3–2	27 July 2015
(Russia) Artyom Delkin	Gazovik	Baykal	3–0	27 July 2015
(Russia) Aleksei Pugin	Tom	Torpedo	4–0	17 August 2015
(Russia) Aleksandr Alkhazov^{**}	Volgar	Luch-Energiya	4–1	15 October 2015
(Russia) Sergei Maslov	Arsenal	Spartak-2	4–1	26 October 2015

- ^{4} Player scored 4 goals
- ^{**} All goals scored from the penalty spot

Last updated: 8 November 2015

== Attendance ==
=== Average home attendances ===
Ranked from highest to lowest average attendance.

Updated as of 8 November 2015

Team	GP	Total	High	Low	Average
Fakel	9	90,400	12,800	7,200	10,044
Arsenal	11	63,000	8,200	3,200	5,727
Baltika	9	46,400	7,500	3,400	5,156
Sokol	9	35,150	6,600	1,150	3,906
Luch-Energiya	9	27,500	6,100	1,100	3,056
Tom	12	35,520	4,500	1,500	2,960
Volga	10	24,450	3,800	1,000	2,445
Gazovik	10	24,200	3,000	2,000	2,420
Yenisey	9	20,450	4,900	900	2,272
Sibir	9	19,950	4,000	1,000	2,217
Torpedo	8	15,900	2,500	800	1,988
SKA-Energiya	10	19,500	3,100	1,000	1,950
Shinnik	11	20,200	5,600	1,000	1,836
Tyumen	11	20,050	2,500	1,000	1,823
Baikal	9	13,950	3,200	250	1,550
Volgar	10	13,100	2,200	950	1,310
Zenit-2	9	10,015	1,500	495	1,113
Spartak-2	8	7,962	2,506	107	964
Tosno	8	5,250	1,900	350	656
KAMAZ	9	2,250	450	100	250
