= Lenin Stadium (Khabarovsk) =

Sports venue in Khabarovsk, Russia

Coordinates: 48°28′44″N 135°02′47″E

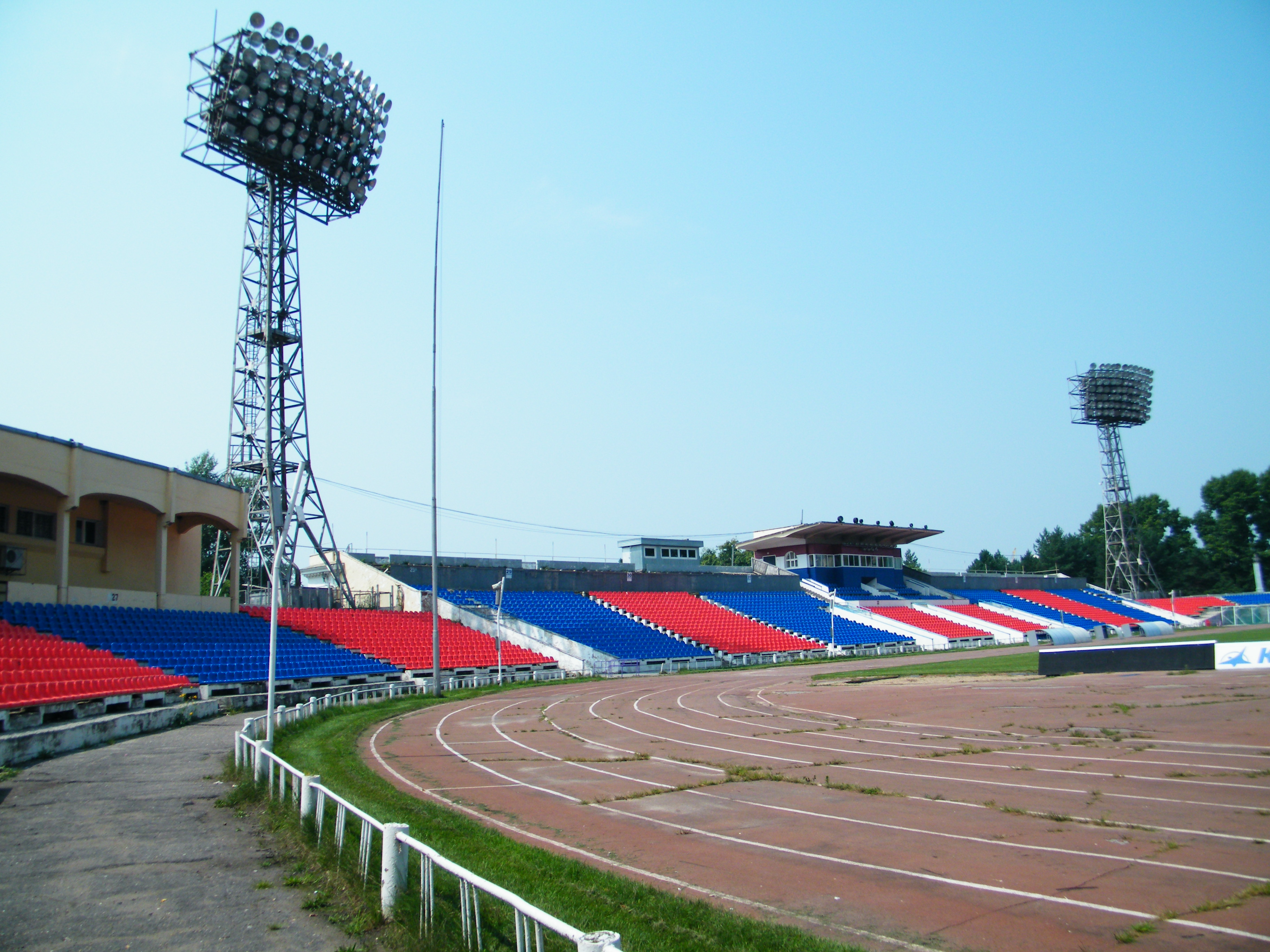
- Interactive map of Lenin Stadium
- Location: Khabarovsk, Russia
- Capacity: 15,200

Construction
- Opened: 1957

Tenant
- FC SKA-Khabarovsk

Lenin Stadium (Russian: Стадион имени Ленина) is a multi-use stadium in Khabarovsk, Russia. It is currently used mostly for association football matches and is the home ground of FC SKA-Khabarovsk. The stadium holds 15,200 people. It is named after communist revolutionary Vladimir Lenin.
