= FC Smena Komsomolsk-na-Amure =

Russian football club

Smena Komsomolsk
- Full name: Football Club Smena Komsomolsk-na-Amure
- Founded: 1935
- Ground: Vanguard Stadium
- Capacity: 16,000
- Chairman: Sergei Ogarkov
Home colours	Away colours

FC Smena Komsomolsk-na-Amure (Russian: ФК «Смена» Комсомольск-на-Амуре) is a Russian football club from Komsomolsk-on-Amur, founded in 1935. It played in the Russian Professional Football League. It played professionally in 1946, 1957–1970, 1978–1994 and from 2002 to 2018. It reached the second-highest level (Soviet First League and Russian First Division) in 1957–1962 and 1992.

They won their Russian Professional Football League zone East in the 2015–16 season, but did not participate in the second-tier 2016–17 Russian Football National League as they don't have necessary financing. Their main source of income is Khabarovsk Krai which already finances another FNL team FC SKA-Energiya Khabarovsk and doesn't have necessary expenses budgeted for a second FNL team. Before the 2018–19 season, the league proposed splitting the East zone of the PFL into two new zones - Siberia and Far East. However, the largest number of teams was not sustainable for the full season. Smena was forced to drop out to the amateur levels.

== Team name history ==
- 1935–1945: Stroitel
- 1946–1956: Dynamo
- 1957–1959: Lokomotiv
- 1960–1977: Avangard
- 1978–1999: Amur
- 1999–2001: KnAAPO-Smena
- 2002–present: Smena
