= FC SKA-Khabarovsk =

Russian football club

SKA-Khabarovsk
- Full name: Футбольный клуб СКА-Хабаровск (Football Club SKA-Khabarovsk)
- Nicknames: Krasno-siniye (The red-blues); Armeytsy (Army men)
- Founded: 1946; 80 years ago
- Ground: Lenin Stadium, Khabarovsk, Russia
- Capacity: 14,800
- Owner(s): Khabarovsk Krai; RusHydro (through subsidiary); Komsomolsk-on-Amur Aircraft Production Association
- Chairman: Mikhail Gusev
- Manager: Sergey Zhukov
- League: Russian First League
- 2025–26: 15th of 18
- Website: http://fcska.ru/
Home colours	Away colours	Third colours

Football Club SKA-Khabarovsk (Russian: Футбольный клуб СКА-Хабаровск) is a Russian professional association football club based in Khabarovsk which plays in the second-tier Russian First League. They played in the Russian Premier League for the first time ever in the 2017–18 season. At more than 6,000 kilometres (3,700 mi) east of Moscow, SKA Khabarovsk are the most Easterly team to have taken part in a UEFA domestic top division.

== History ==
The club has been known under different names:

- DKA (−1953)
- ODO (1954)
- DO (1955–56)
- OSK (1957)
- SKVO (1957–59)
- SKA (1960–99)
- SKA-Energia (1999–2016)
- SKA-Khabarovsk (2016–)

The club has participated in the Soviet championships since 1957. SKA were the quarter-finalists of the Soviet Cup in 1963. They had never played in the Soviet Top League or Russian Premier League, until 2017.

SKA's best result in the Soviet First League was the 6th position in 1980, and their best result in the Russian First Division was 4th position in 2012–13. This entitled them to a promotion/relegation play-off against FC Rostov, 13th place in the RPL, but they lost 3–0 on aggregate and missed their chance to compete in the top flight.

Location within Russia

At the end of the 2016–17 season, SKA equalled their record best finish, at the same time qualifying for a promotion play-off against FC Orenburg. On 28 May 2017, SKA were promoted to the Russian Premier League for the first time in their history, after beating FC Orenburg in the promotion play-off. They won 5–3 in a penalty shoot-out, after 0–0 draws in both the home and away legs.

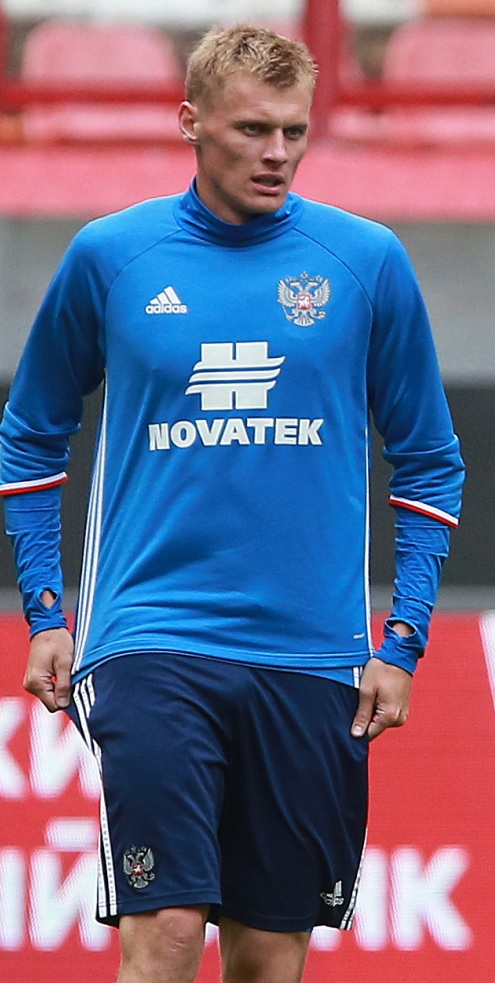
Roman Yemelyanov joined SKA Khabarovsk in 2024

SKA started their first Premier League season with 4 losses. After improving results in the next stretch of games, the losses starting mounting up again. Aleksei Poddubskiy was replaced as manager by Rinat Bilyaletdinov during the winter break, Bilyaletdinov only lasted four games before being replaced by Sergei Perednya. On 22 April 2018, SKA lost 1–0 to Dynamo Moscow at home (which was their 13th loss in a stretch of 15 winless games) and lost the mathematical chance to avoid relegation back to the second-tier Russian Football National League.

In the 2021–22 season, SKA-Khabarovsk qualified for the Premier League promotion playoffs in which they lost 1–3 on aggregate to FC Khimki therefore remaining in the FNL for at least another season.

=== Domestic history ===
Season	League									Russian Cup	Top goalscorer		Manager
Season	Div.	Pos.	Pl.	W	D	L	GS	GA	P	Russian Cup	Name	League	Manager
2008	2nd	8th	42	17	10	15	63	60	61	Round of 32	(Russia) Aleksandr Yarkin	21	
2009	2nd	11th	38	12	11	15	43	42	47	Fifth round	(Russia) Vasili Karmazinenko	9	
2010	2nd	11th	38	15	8	15	37	39	53	Round of 16	(Russia) Vasili Karmazinenko	10	
2011–12	2nd	11th	48	16	14	18	57	66	62	Fifth round Fifth round	(Russia) Yevgeni Lutsenko	13	(Russia) Igor Protasov (Russia) Aleksandr Grigoryan
2012–13	2nd	4th	32	13	13	6	36	26	52	Round of 16	(Russia) Yevgeni Lutsenko	8	(Russia) Aleksandr Grigoryan (Georgia (country)) Giorgi Daraselia
2013–14	2nd	7th	36	15	11	10	43	34	56	Round of 16	(Brazil) Nathan Júnior	9	(Lithuania) Valdas Ivanauskas
2014–15	2nd	14th	38	13	10	15	36	35	49	Fourth Round	(Brazil) Nathan Júnior	6	(Lithuania) Valdas Ivanauskas (Russia) Aleksandr Grigoryan
2015–16	2nd	14th	38	13	10	15	36	35	49	Round of 16	(Russia) Konstantin Bazelyuk	10	(Russia) Aleksandr Grigoryan
2016–17	2nd	4th	38	15	14	9	45	33	59	Round of 16	(Armenia) Ruslan Koryan	12	(Russia) Aleksandr Grigoryan (Russia) Aleksei Poddubskiy
2017–18	1st	16th	30	2	7	21	16	55	13	Quarterfinal	(Serbia) Miroslav Marković	4	(Russia) Aleksei Poddubskiy (Russia) Rinat Bilyaletdinov (Russia) Sergei Perednya
2018–19	2nd	7th	38	15	13	10	46	41	58	Round of 32	(Turkmenistan) Maksim Kazankov	7	(Russia) Sergei Perednya (Russia) Vadim Evseev (Russia) Aleksei Poddubskiy
2019–20	2nd	6th	27	12	7	8	42	30	43	Round of 32	(Russia) Adlan Katsayev	9	(Russia) Aleksei Poddubskiy
2020–21	2nd	11th	42	17	9	16	52	47	60	Round of 16	(Russia) Konstantin Bazelyuk	12	(Russia) Aleksei Poddubskiy (Russia) Sergei Yuran
2021–22	2nd	4th	38	19	8	11	48	38	65	Qualifying Round 3	(Russia) David Karayev	14	(Russia) Sergei Yuran (Russia) Aleksei Poddubskiy
2022–23	2nd	10th	34	11	11	12	50	39	44	Qualifying Round 4	(Russia) Ilya Petrov (Russia) Said Aliyev	7	(Russia) Roman Sharonov
2023–24	2nd	13th	34	11	8	15	33	36	41	Regions path Quarter-finals Stage 2	(Russia) Oleg Kozhemyakin (Russia) Said Aliyev	6	(Russia) Roman Sharonov
2024–25	2nd	6th	34	15	8	11	44	41	53	Qualifying Round 4	(Russia) Georgi Gongadze	12	(Russia) Dmitri Voyetskiy (Russia) Aleksei Poddubskiy (Russia) Aleksei Poddubskiy
2025–26	2nd	12th	34	10	12	12	37	45	42	Qualifying Round 4	(Spain) Jacobo Alcalde	9	(Russia) Aleksei Poddubskiy (Russia) Mikhail Semyonov

== Current squad ==
As of 11 September 2026

Note: Flags indicate national team as defined under FIFA eligibility rules; some limited exceptions apply. Players may hold more than one non-FIFA nationality.

No.	Pos.	Nation	Player
1	GK	RUS	Mikhail Shtepa
2	DF	RUS	Aleksandr Zhirov
4	DF	RUS	Konstantin Savichev
5	MF	RUS	Eldar Bliyev
6	MF	RUS	Sadyg Bagiyev (on loan from Torpedo Moscow)
7	MF	MDA	Nichita Moțpan
8	MF	RUS	Dmitri Markitesov
9	FW	ESP	Jacobo Alcalde
10	MF	AZE	Kamran Əliyev
11	FW	RUS	Vladislav Bragin
14	DF	RUS	Yegor Mosin (on loan from Ural Yekaterinburg)
16	GK	RUS	Vitali Botnar
17	DF	RUS	Denis Fomin
20	MF	RUS	Igor Shkolik
21	FW	RUS	Maksim Maksimov
22	MF	RUS	Andrey Putilov

No.	Pos.	Nation	Player
23	FW	RUS	Stepan Burdakov
24	MF	RUS	Mikhail Gorelishvili
29	DF	RUS	Aleksandr Mukhin
31	GK	RUS	Dmitry Nagayev
37	DF	RUS	Makar Chirkov (on loan from Sochi)
40	MF	RUS	Roman Prishchepov
50	FW	RUS	Stepan Glotov
61	DF	RUS	Matvey Uzhgin
63	DF	RUS	Daniil Borisov
65	GK	RUS	Andrey Boyko
77	MF	ARM	Arshak Koryan
82	DF	RUS	Demyan Ilyev
84	DF	RUS	Yaroslav Grebyonkin
87	MF	RUS	Artur Kopylov
91	DF	RUS	Yegor Noskov
95	MF	RUS	Maksim Ulezko

=== Out on loan ===
Note: Flags indicate national team as defined under FIFA eligibility rules; some limited exceptions apply. Players may hold more than one non-FIFA nationality.

No.	Pos.	Nation	Player
—	MF	RUS	Vadim Vshivkov (at Sibir Novosibirsk until 30 June 2027)

== Notable players ==
Had international caps for their respective countries. Players whose name is listed in bold represented their countries while playing for SKA-Khabarovsk.

USSR and Russia

- (Soviet Union) Vladimir Astapovsky
- (Russia) Viktor Bulatov
- (Russia) Viktor Fayzulin
- (Soviet Union) (Commonwealth of Independent States) (Russia) Andrey Ivanov
- (Soviet Union) Boris Kopeikin
- (Russia) Nikolay Olenikov
- (Soviet Union) Sergey Olshansky
- (Russia) Andrei Semyonov
- (Soviet Union) Aleksandr Tarkhanov
- (Soviet Union) (Commonwealth of Independent States) (Russia) Akhrik Tsveiba
- (Russia) Aleksandr Yerokhin

Asia

- (Tajikistan) Igor Vityutnev
- (Turkmenistan) Wýaçeslaw Krendelew
- (Uzbekistan) Vladimir Radkevich

Europe

- (Armenia) **Robert Arzumanyan**
- (Armenia) **Ruslan Koryan**
- (Azerbaijan) Gennadi Drozdov
- (Azerbaijan) Rizvan Umarov
- (Belarus) Syarhey Kavalchuk
- (Belarus) **Andrey Paryvaew**
- (Bulgaria) Ventsislav Hristov
- (Estonia) Mark Švets
- (Georgia (country)) **Kakhaber Aladashvili**
- (Georgia (country)) Gogita Gogua
- (Georgia (country)) **Shota Grigalashvili**
- (Georgia (country)) Gocha Khojava
- (Georgia (country)) **Otar Martsvaladze**
- (Georgia (country)) **Giorgi Navalovski**
- (Georgia (country)) Lasha Salukvadze
- (Kazakhstan) Vitaliy Artemov
- (Kazakhstan) Qayrat Aymanov
- (Kazakhstan) Aleksandr Gorbunov
- (Kazakhstan) Oleg Musin
- (Latvia) Aivars Drupass
- (Latvia) Olegs Karavajevs
- (Lithuania) Darius Miceika
- (Lithuania) **Tomas Mikuckis**
- (Moldova) Serghei Alexeev
- (Moldova) **Valeriu Andronic**
- (Moldova) Serghei Chirilov
- (Moldova) Alexandr Covalenco
- (Moldova) Iurie Priganiuc
- (Moldova) Roman Radcenco
- (Moldova) Serghei Secu
- (Moldova) Adrian Sosnovschi
- (Ukraine) Denys Dedechko
- (Ukraine) Andriy Dikan
- (Ukraine) Oleksandr Kyryukhin

Africa

- (South Africa) MacDonald Mukansi

== Coaching staff ==
Position	Name
Manager	(Russia) Roman Sharonov
Senior Manager	(Russia) Alexey Andreevich
Assistant Manager	(Russia) Yuri Shpiryuk
Goalkeeping Coach	(Russia) Maxim Ivanovich
Fitness Coach	(Ukraine) Oleg Anatolievich (Russia) Dmitri Gureev
Analyst	(Russia) Yurievich Vyacheslav
Rehabilitologist	(Russia) Ruslan Gennadievich
Team Leader	(Russia) Sergey Vladimirovich
Administrator	(Russia) Denis Rafailovich
Junior Administrator	(Russia) Ilshat Marsovich
Doctor	(Russia) Anatoly Georgievich
Masseur	(Russia) Marat Ulfatovich (Russia) Danil Yurievich (Russia) Marat Ishmurzin
Rehabilitation Specialist	(Russia) Danil Yurievich
