= 1997 PFC CSKA Moscow season =

CSKA
1997 season
- Manager: Pavel Sadyrin
- Stadium: Dynamo Stadium; Grigory Fedotov Stadium; Stroitel Stadium
- Top League: 12th
- Russian Cup: Round of 16 vs Zarya Leninsk-Kuznetsky
- Russian Cup: Continued in 1998
- Top goalscorer: League: Vladimir Kulik (9); All: Vladimir Kulik (11)

The 1997 CSKA season was the club's sixth season in the Russian Top League, the highest tier of association football in Russia.

== Squad ==
As of match played 9 November 1997

Name	Nationality	Position	Date of birth (age)	Signed from	Signed in	Contract ends	Apps.	Goals
Goalkeepers
Sergey Armishev	(Russia)	GK	29 April 1976 (aged 21)	Uralmash Yekaterinburg	1997		5	0
Andrei Novosadov	(Russia)	GK	27 March 1972 (aged 25)	KAMAZ	1993		45	0
Ihor Kutepov	(Ukraine)	GK	17 December 1965 (aged 31)	Tyumen	1997		14	0
Defenders
Deni Gaisumov	(Azerbaijan)	DF	6 February 1968 (aged 29)	Spartak Moscow	1997		24	2
Maksim Bokov	(Russia)	DF	29 August 1973 (aged 24)	Zenit St.Petersburg	1997		34	0
Sergei Mamchur	(Russia)	DF	3 February 1972 (aged 25)	Asmaral Moscow	1993		128	3
Valeri Minko	(Russia)	DF	8 August 1971 (aged 26)	Dynamo Barnaul	1989		169	10
Denis Pervushin	(Russia)	DF	18 January 1977 (aged 20)	TRASKO Moscow	1996		47	0
Pyotr Sedunov	(Russia)	DF	28 September 1977 (aged 20)	Luleå	1997		3	0
Vitali Tasenko	(Russia)	DF	30 January 1975 (aged 22)	SKA Rostov-on-Don	1997		5	0
Andriy Sydelnykov	(Ukraine)	DF	27 September 1967 (aged 30)	Chunnam Dragons	1997		1	0
Midfielders
Yevgeny Ageyev	(Russia)	MF	25 September 1976 (aged 21)	Rostselmash	1997		23	0
Aleksandr Grishin	(Russia)	MF	18 November 1971 (aged 25)	Dynamo Moscow	1997		105	25
Dmitri Karsakov	(Russia)	MF	29 December 1971 (aged 25)	Bucheon Yukong	1997		120	22
Dmitri Kuznetsov	(Russia)	MF	28 August 1965 (aged 32)	Espanyol	1997		27	6
Andrei Nikolayev	(Russia)	MF	6 August 1976 (aged 21)	Torpedo Moscow	1997		3	0
Aleksei Savelyev	(Russia)	MF	10 April 1977 (aged 20)	Torpedo Moscow	1997		22	2
Sergei Semak	(Russia)	MF	27 February 1976 (aged 21)	Asmaral Moscow	1994		101	21
Igor Semshov	(Russia)	MF	6 April 1978 (aged 19)	Academy	1996		11	1
Sergey Shustikov	(Russia)	MF	30 September 1970 (aged 27)	Racing de Santander	1997		28	1
Dmitri Khomukha	(Turkmenistan)	MF	23 August 1969 (aged 28)	Zenit St.Petersburg	1997		35	5
Forwards
Sergey Korovushkin	(Russia)	FW	26 January 1979 (aged 18)	Volga Tver	1997		8	0
Sergei Kulichenko	(Russia)	FW	3 February 1978 (aged 19)	Academy	1997		6	1
Vladimir Kulik	(Russia)	FW	18 February 1972 (aged 25)	Zenit St.Petersburg	1997		33	11
Andrey Movsisyan	(Russia)	FW	27 October 1975 (aged 22)	Spartak-d Moscow	1996		29	5
Out on loan
Andrei Tsaplin	(Russia)	DF	22 January 1977 (aged 20)	Academy	1996		10	0
Oleksandr Shutov	(Ukraine)	MF	12 June 1975 (aged 22)	Rostselmash	1996		28	0
Left During the Season
Nugzar Lobzhanidze	(Georgia (country))	DF	7 September 1971 (aged 26)	Dinamo Tbilisi	1997		12	0
Dmytro Yakovenko	(Ukraine)	DF	6 May 1971 (aged 26)	Kryvbas Kryvyi Rih	1997		3	0
Tigran Petrosyants	(Armenia)	MF	23 December 1973 (aged 23)	Torpedo Moscow	1997		14	0
Dmitry Ulyanov	(Russia)	MF	28 October 1970 (aged 25)	Torpedo Moscow	1997		57	6
Aleksei Gerasimov	(Russia)	FW	13 January 1973 (aged 24)	Lokomotiv Nizhny Novgorod	1995		85	18
Andriy Demchenko	(Ukraine)	FW	20 August 1976 (aged 21)	loan from Torpedo Zaporizhzhia	1997		9	2

== Transfers ==
In: Note: Flags indicate national team as defined under FIFA eligibility rules; some limited exceptions apply. Players may hold more than one non-FIFA nationality.

No.	Pos.	Nation	Player
—	GK	RUS	Sergey Armishev (from (Russia) Uralmash Yekaterinburg)
—	GK	UKR	Ihor Kutepov (from (Russia) Tyumen)
—	DF	AZE	Deni Gaisumov (from (Russia) Spartak Moscow)
—	DF	GEO	Nugzar Lobzhanidze (from (Georgia (country)) Dinamo Tbilisi)
—	DF	RUS	Maksim Bokov (from (Russia) Zenit St.Petersburg)
—	DF	RUS	Pyotr Sedunov (from (Sweden) Luleå)
—	DF	RUS	Vitali Tasenko (from (Russia) SKA Rostov-on-Don)
—	DF	UKR	Andriy Sydelnykov (from (South Korea) Chunnam Dragons)
—	DF	UKR	Dmytro Yakovenko (from (Ukraine) Kryvbas Kryvyi Rih)
—	MF	RUS	Yevgeny Ageyev (from (Russia) Rostselmash)
—	MF	RUS	Aleksandr Grishin (from (Russia) Dynamo Moscow)
—	MF	RUS	Dmitri Karsakov (from (South Korea) Bucheon Yukong)
—	MF	RUS	Dmitri Kuznetsov (from (Spain) Osasuna)
—	MF	RUS	Andrei Nikolayev (from (Russia) Torpedo Moscow)
—	MF	RUS	Aleksei Savelyev (from (Russia) Torpedo Moscow)
—	MF	RUS	Sergey Shustikov (from (Spain) Racing Santander)
—	MF	RUS	Dmitry Ulyanov (from (Spain) Racing Santander)
—	MF	TKM	Dmitri Khomukha (from (Russia) Zenit St.Petersburg)
—	MF	UKR	Andriy Demchenko (loan from (Ukraine) Torpedo Zaporizhzhia)
—	FW	RUS	Sergey Korovushkin (from (Russia) Volga Tver)
—	FW	RUS	Vladimir Kulik (from (Russia) Zenit St.Petersburg)

Out: Note: Flags indicate national team as defined under FIFA eligibility rules; some limited exceptions apply. Players may hold more than one non-FIFA nationality.

No.	Pos.	Nation	Player
—	GK	RUS	Dmitri Goncharov (to (Russia) CSK VVS-Kristall Smolensk)
—	GK	UKR	Dmytro Tyapushkin (to (Russia) Dynamo Moscow)
—	DF	GEO	Nugzar Lobzhanidze (to (Georgia (country)) Dinamo Tbilisi)
—	DF	LTU	Andrėjus Tereškinas (loan return to (Lithuania) Žalgiris Vilnius)
—	DF	RUS	Yevgeni Bushmanov (to (Russia) Torpedo Moscow)
—	DF	RUS	Denis Mashkarin (to (Russia) Torpedo Moscow)
—	DF	UKR	Dmytro Yakovenko (to (Russia) Saturn Ramenskoye)
—	MF	BRA	Leonidas (to (Brazil) Atlético Paranaense)
—	MF	BRA	Leandro Samarone (loan return to (Brazil) Ituano)
—	MF	RUS	Andrei Gashkin (to (Russia) Torpedo Moscow)
—	MF	RUS	Dmitri Khokhlov (to (Russia) Torpedo Moscow)
—	MF	RUS	Dmitry Ulyanov (to (Israel) Hapoel Haifa)
—	MF	UKR	Oleksandr Shutov (loan to (Ukraine) Chornomorets Odesa)
—	FW	LTU	Edgaras Jankauskas (to (Russia) Torpedo Moscow)
—	FW	RUS	Aleksei Gerasimov (to (Israel) Maccabi Tel Aviv)
—	FW	RUS	Vladimir Lebed (to (Russia) Zenit St. Petersburg)

== Competitions ==
=== Top League ===
==== Results by round ====
Round	1	2	3	4	5	6	7	8	9	10	11	12	13	14	15	16	17	18	19	20	21	22	23	24	25	26	27	28	29	30	31	32	33	34
Ground	A	H	A	H	A	H	A	H	A	A	H	A	H	A	H	A	H	H	A	H	A	H	A	H	A	H	H	A	H	A	H	A	H	A
Result	L	W	L	D	W	L	D	L	W	L	W	L	D	D	L	L	W	D	L	L	W	D	L	D	W	W	L	L	L	D	W	W	W	D

Updated to match(es) played on 9 November 1997. Source: See Results
A = Away; H = Home; W = Win; D = Draw; L = Loss

==== Results ====
16 March 1997 1	Dynamo Moscow	2 – 0	CSKA Moscow	Moscow
17:00 MSK (UTC+3)	Astrowski (yellow card) 35'; Gordeyev 38'; Teryokhin 56'; Skokov (yellow card) 79'; Kovtun (yellow card) 82'	Report	Bokov (yellow card) 27'; Ulyanov (yellow card) 54'	Stadium: Dynamo Stadium; Referee: S.Anokhin

22 March 1997 2	CSKA Moscow	2 – 1	Alania Vladikavkaz	Moscow
17:00 MSK (UTC+3)	Lobzhanidze (yellow card) 32' (yellow-red card) 54'; Kulik 42', 45' (yellow card) 78'; Ulyanov (yellow card) 58'	Report	Tskhadadze (yellow card) 26'; Kornienko (yellow card) 29'; Hetsko (penalty missed) 38' 88' (pen.); Kobiashvili (yellow card) 53'	Stadium: Dynamo Stadium; Referee: S.Gusev

2 April 1997 3	Rotor Volgograd	1 – 0	CSKA Moscow	Volgograd
18:00 MSK (UTC+4)	Niederhaus 35'; Berketov (yellow card) 86'	Report	Mamchur (yellow card) 32' (yellow-red card) 77'	Stadium: Central Profsoyuz Stadium; Referee: Nikolai Ivanov

5 April 1997 4	CSKA Moscow	1 – 1	Zhemchuzhina-Sochi	Moscow
17:00 MSK (UTC+4)	Lobzhanidze (yellow card) 24'; Kulik 85' (pen.)	Report	Kuznetsov 58' (yellow card) 59'; Gorelov (yellow card) 70'; Sanko (yellow card) 84'; Kryukov (yellow card) 84'	Stadium: Dynamo Stadium; Referee: S.Isakov

12 April 1997 5	Shinnik Yaroslavl	0 – 1	CSKA Moscow	Yaroslavl
18:00 MSK (UTC+4)	Grishin (penalty missed) 73'	Report	Kulik 59' (pen.)	Stadium: Shinnik Stadium; Referee: G.Kulichenkov

19 April 1997 6	CSKA Moscow	0 – 5	Torpedo Moscow	Moscow
17:00 MSK (UTC+4)		Report	Jankauskas 25' (pen.), 46'; Arlowski (yellow card) 51'; Gashkin 56'; Khokhlov 81'; Ražanauskas 83'	Stadium: Dynamo Stadium; Referee: Yuri Baskakov

23 April 1997 7	Spartak Moscow	0 – 0	CSKA Moscow	Moscow
19:00 MSK (UTC+4)	Yevdokimov (yellow card) 75'	Report	Bokov (yellow card) 60'	Stadium: Luzhniki Stadium; Referee: A.Butenko

3 May 1997 8	CSKA Moscow	0 – 1	Chernomorets Novorossiysk	Moscow
17:00 MSK (UTC+4)	Pervushin (yellow card) 11'	Report	Berezner 7'; Doguzov (yellow card) 29'; Dyomin (yellow card) 35'; Geraschenko (yellow card) 50'	Stadium: Dynamo Stadium; Referee: Lom-Ali Ibragimov

10 May 1997 9	KAMAZ	0 – 3	CSKA Moscow	Naberezhnye Chelny
17:00 MSK (UTC+4)	Yugrin (yellow card) 10'; Jishkariani (yellow card) 80'	Report	Ulyanov 23'; Demchenko 35' (yellow card) 43'; Semshov 48'; Shustikov (yellow card) 88'	Stadium: KAMAZ Stadium; Referee: Nikolai Ivanov

17 May 1997 10	Tyumen	2 – 0	CSKA Moscow	Tyumen
MSK (UTC+4)	Potylchak 64'; Tatarkin 77'	Report	Ulyanov (yellow card) 29'	Stadium: Geolog Stadium; Referee: Taras Bezubyak

24 May 1997 11	CSKA Moscow	2 – 0	Zenit St.Petersburg	Selyatino
17:00 MSK (UTC+4)	Bokov (yellow card) 17'; Gerasimov 37'; Kulik 59'	Report	Dmitriyev (yellow card) 17'	Stadium: Stroitel Stadium; Referee: S.Gusev

31 May 1997 12	Krylia Sovetov	1 – 0	CSKA Moscow	Samara
MSK (UTC+4)	Makeyev (yellow card) 25'; Lushan (yellow card) 76'; Minashvili 86'	Report		Stadium: Metallurg Stadium; Referee: G.Kulichenkov

14 June 1997 13	CSKA Moscow	1 – 1	Baltika Kaliningrad	Selyatino
17:00 MSK (UTC+4)	Semak 70'	Report	Herasimets 77' (yellow card) 90'	Stadium: Stroitel Stadium; Referee: G.Kulichenkov

18 June 1997 14	Rostselmash	1 – 1	CSKA Moscow	Rostov-on-Don
19:00 MSK (UTC+4)	Khankeyev 15'; Prudius (yellow card) 61'	Report	Khomukha 50'; Shustikov (yellow card) 71'; Demchenko (yellow card) 89'	Stadium: Olimp-2; Referee: Nikolai Levnikov

25 June 1997 15	CSKA Moscow	1 – 2	Lokomotiv Moscow	Moscow
19:00 MSK (UTC+4)	Kulik (yellow card) 30'; Savelyev 62'; Semshov (yellow card) 70'	Report	Drozdov (yellow card) 39'; Borodyuk 44'; Janashia 81'; Kamnev (yellow card) 86'	Stadium: Dynamo Stadium; Referee: Sergei Khusainov

2 July 1997 16	Lokomotiv Nizhny Novgorod	3 – 1	CSKA Moscow	Nizhny Novgorod
MSK (UTC+4)	Rapeika 17' (yellow card) 37'; Ionanidze 29'; Duyun 78'	Report	Pervushin (yellow card) 35'; Demchenko 57'; Bokov (yellow card) 62'; Shustikov (yellow card) 77'	Stadium: Lokomotiv Stadium; Referee: N.Frolov

9 July 1997 17	CSKA Moscow	1 – 0	Fakel Voronezh	Moscow
19:00 MSK (UTC+4)	Kulik 5' (yellow card) 40'; Movsisyan (yellow card) 77'	Report	Beskrovny (yellow card) 64'; Shmarov (yellow card) 69'; Yudin (yellow card) 74'	Stadium: Dynamo Stadium; Referee: Aleksandr Lapin

16 July 1997 18	CSKA Moscow	1 – 1	Dynamo Moscow	Moscow
18:00 MSK (UTC+4)	Khomukha 79' (pen.)	Report	Kobelev 76'; Kovtun (yellow card) 78'	Stadium: Dynamo Stadium; Referee: Nikolai Ivanov

23 July 1997 19	Alania Vladikavkaz	3 – 0	CSKA Moscow	Vladikavkaz
MSK (UTC+4)	Tedeyev 43', 58', 63' (pen.); Kanishchev (yellow card) 89'	Report	Shustikov (red card) 48'	Stadium: Republican Spartak Stadium; Referee: S.Gusev

30 July 1997 20	CSKA Moscow	0 – 2	Rotor Volgograd	Moscow
19:00 MSK (UTC+4)		Report	Zubko 22', 26'; Borzenkov (yellow card) 31'; Shmarko (yellow card) 84'	Stadium: Grigory Fedotov Stadium; Referee: Taras Bezubyak

2 August 1997 21	Zhemchuzhina-Sochi	2 – 3	CSKA Moscow	Sochi
MSK (UTC+4)	Bogatyryov 30'; Gogiashvili (yellow card) 31'; Gogrichiani 62'; Kudinov (yellow card) 76'	Report	Movsisyan 10'; Kulik 22'; Gaisumov (yellow card) 31'; Ageyev (yellow card) 47'; Khomukha 57'; Petrosyants (yellow card) 57'	Stadium: Sochi Central Stadium; Referee: Aleksandr Lapin

9 August 1997 22	CSKA Moscow	0 – 0	Shinnik Yaroslavl	Moscow
18:00 MSK (UTC+4)	Pervushin (yellow card) 31' (yellow-red card) 68'	Report	Putilin (red card) 46'	Stadium: Grigory Fedotov Stadium; Referee: Nikolai Levnikov

16 August 1997 23	Torpedo Moscow	3 – 0	CSKA Moscow	Moscow
17:00 MSK (UTC+4)	Khokhlov 12' (yellow card) 27'; Jankauskas 36'; Kamoltsev 82'	Report	Bokov (yellow card) 25'	Stadium: Eduard Streltsov Stadium; Referee: S.Zuev

23 August 1997 24	CSKA Moscow	0 – 0	Spartak Moscow	Moscow
17:00 MSK (UTC+4)	Ageyev (yellow card) 24'; Gaisumov (yellow card) 34'; Gerasimov (yellow card) 61'	Report	Gorlukovich (yellow card) 46'; Titov (yellow card) 62'; Evseev (yellow card) 82'	Stadium: Dynamo Stadium; Referee: A.Kozhukhov

20 August 1997 25	Chernomorets Novorossiysk	0 – 1	CSKA Moscow	Novorossiysk
MSK (UTC+4)	Doguzov (yellow card) 16'; Rusanovskyi (yellow card) 54'; Abdrazakov (yellow card) 83'	Report	Kulik 13'; Kuznetsov (yellow card) 24'; Grishin (yellow card) 49'	Stadium: Central Stadium; Referee: G.Kulichenkov

3 September 1997 26	CSKA Moscow	1 – 0	KAMAZ	Moscow
16:00 MSK (UTC+4)	Shustikov 87'	Report	Lukhvich (yellow card) 84'	Stadium: Grigory Fedotov Stadium; Referee: Nikolai Ivanov

13 September 1997 27	CSKA Moscow	0 – 3	Tyumen	Moscow
15:00 MSK (UTC+4)	Bokov (yellow card) 57'; Grishin (yellow card) 81'	Report	Borodkin 7', 70' (pen.); Burov (yellow card) 36'; Bezsmertnyi (yellow card) 43' (yellow-red card) 58'; Zhirov 50'	Stadium: Grigory Fedotov Stadium; Referee: N.Frolov

20 September 1997 28	Zenit St.Petersburg	2 – 0	CSKA Moscow	Saint Petersburg
MSK (UTC+4)	Zazulin 33'; Horshkov 60'	Report	Bokov (yellow card) 57'	Stadium: Petrovsky Stadium; Referee: Lom-Ali Ibragimov

27 September 1997 29	CSKA Moscow	1 – 2	Krylia Sovetov	Moscow
15:00 MSK (UTC+4)	Ageyev (yellow card) 18'; Korovushkin (yellow card) 80'; Kuznetsov (penalty missed) 89'; Khomukha 90'	Report	Tsiklauri 4'; Bulatov (yellow card) 23'; Avalyan 43'; Bulatov (yellow card) 82'	Stadium: Grigory Fedotov Stadium; Referee: N.Frolov

4 October 1997 30	Baltika Kaliningrad	1 – 1	CSKA Moscow	Kaliningrad
16:00 MSK (UTC+4)	Nizovtsev 36' (pen.); Gorbachyov (yellow card) 47'; Fedkov (yellow card) 83'	Report	Semak (yellow card) 23'; Savelyev 46'; Grishin (yellow card) 65'	Stadium: Baltika Stadium; Referee: Aleksandr Lapin

14 October 1997 31	CSKA Moscow	2 – 0	Rostselmash	Moscow
15:00 MSK (UTC+4)	Semak 10'; Tasenko (yellow card) 79'; Kulik (penalty missed) 89' 89'	Report	Khankeyev (yellow card) 53' (yellow-red card) 90'; Savchenko (red card) 90'	Stadium: Grigory Fedotov Stadium; Referee: Taras Bezubyak

18 October 1997 32	Lokomotiv Moscow	1 – 3	CSKA Moscow	Moscow
19:00 MSK (UTC+4)	Kharlachyov (yellow card) 19' (yellow-red card) 68'; Janashia 81'	Report	Semak 18', 53'; Tasenko (yellow card) 43'; Gerasimov 89'	Stadium: Lokomotiv Stadium; Referee: F.Erzimanov

1 November 1997 33	CSKA Moscow	3 – 0	Lokomotiv Nizhny Novgorod	Moscow
15:00 MSK (UTC+3)	Kulichenko 16'; Gaisumov (yellow card) 60'; Kuznetsov 63'; Grishin 90' (pen.)	Report	Chudin (yellow card) 77'	Stadium: Grigory Fedotov Stadium; Referee: Nikolai Levnikov

9 November 1997 34	Fakel Voronezh	1 – 1	CSKA Moscow	Voronezh
14:00 MSK (UTC+3)	Ovsyannikov 47'; Shmarov (yellow card) 69'	Report	Grishin (yellow card) 22'; Kuznetsov 80'; Kulichenko (yellow card) 86'	Stadium: Tsentralnyi Profsoyuz Stadion; Referee: Aleksandr Lapin

==== Table ====
Pos	Team	Pld	W	D	L	GF	GA	GD	Pts
10	Alania Vladikavkaz	34	14	4	16	52	42	+10	46
11	Torpedo Moscow	34	13	6	15	50	46	+4	45
12	CSKA Moscow	34	11	9	14	31	42	−11	42
13	Rostselmash	34	9	14	11	34	38	−4	41
14	Zhemchuzhina Sochi	34	11	7	16	38	51	−13	40

Source: rsssf.com
Rules for classification: 1) points; 2) goal difference; 3) number of goals scored.

=== Russian Cup ===
==== 1996-97 ====
8 April 1997 Round of 32	Saturn Ramenskoye	0 – 2	CSKA Moscow	Ramenskoye
18:00 MSK (UTC+4)	Gusev (yellow card) 45'	Report	Kulik 10', 44' (pen.); Pervushin (yellow card) 58'; Ulyanov (yellow card) 61'	Stadium: Saturn Stadium; Attendance: 13,000; Referee: Lom-Ali Ibragimov

16 April 1997 Round of 16	CSKA Moscow	0 – 0 (a.e.t.) (7–8 p)	Zarya Leninsk-Kuznetsky	Moscow
18:00 MSK (UTC+4)	Movsisyan (yellow card) 49'	Report	S.Momotov (yellow card) 38'; Dzutsev (yellow card) 37' (yellow-red card) 108'; Kyrylov (yellow card) 94'	Stadium: Dynamo Stadium; Attendance: 3,500; Referee: Nikolai Levnikov
	Penalties
	Minko (penalty scored); Grishin (penalty scored); Bokov (penalty missed); Khomukha (penalty scored); Kulik (penalty scored); Gerasimov (penalty scored); Tsaplin (penalty scored); Lobzhanidze (penalty scored); Shustikov (penalty missed)		Momotov (penalty scored); Yarkin (penalty scored); Musin (penalty missed); Toporov (penalty scored); Yanotovsky (penalty scored); Kyrylov (penalty scored); Baryshev (penalty scored); Smertin (penalty scored); Bogochev (penalty scored)

==== 1997-98 ====
13 August 1997 Round of 32	Lokomotiv Chita	0 – 0 (a.e.t.) (3 – 4 p)	CSKA Moscow	Chita
MSK (UTC+4)	Ryabukha (yellow card) 40' (yellow-red card) 96'; Makiyenko (yellow card) 88' (yellow-red card) 119'; Galimov (yellow card) 103'	Report	Semak (yellow card) 7' (yellow-red card) 103'; Bokov (yellow card) 37'; Kuznetsov (yellow card) 74'; Mamchur (yellow card) 110'	Stadium: Lokomotiv Stadium; Attendance: 12,000; Referee: Sergei Isakov
	Penalties
	Bogdanov (penalty missed); Kreisman (penalty scored); Seredin (penalty scored); Nedorezov (penalty scored); Nerovny (penalty missed)		Bokov (penalty missed); Movsisyan (penalty scored); Gerasimov (penalty scored); Kuznetsov (penalty scored); Ageyev (penalty scored)

22 October 1997 Round of 16	CSKA Moscow	3 – 2	Zenit St.Petersburg	Moscow
15:00 MSK (UTC+4)	Semak 7', 68'; Khomukha 19'; Kuznetsov (yellow card) 53'; Kulik (yellow card) 64'; Ageyev (yellow card) 86'	Report	Panov 4'; Kondrashov (yellow card) 63'; Vernydub 83' (pen.)	Stadium: Grigory Fedotov Stadium; Attendance: 2,000; Referee: Sergei Gusev

The Quarterfinal took place during the 1998 season.

== Squad statistics ==
As of match played 9 November 1997

=== Appearances and goals ===
No.	Pos	Nat	Player	Total		Top League		1996–97 Russian Cup		1997–98 Russian Cup	
No.	Pos	Nat	Player	Apps	Goals	Apps	Goals	Apps	Goals	Apps	Goals
	GK	(Russia) RUS	Sergey Armishev	5	0	5	0	0	0	0	0
	GK	(Russia) RUS	Andrei Novosadov	19	0	16	0	2	0	1	0
	GK	(Ukraine) UKR	Ihor Kutepov	14	0	13	0	0	0	1	0
	DF	(Azerbaijan) AZE	Deni Gaisumov	14	0	12	0	0	0	1+1	0
	DF	(Russia) RUS	Maksim Bokov	34	0	30	0	2	0	2	0
	DF	(Russia) RUS	Sergei Mamchur	16	0	11+4	0	0	0	1	0
	DF	(Russia) RUS	Valeri Minko	32	0	28	0	2	0	2	0
	DF	(Russia) RUS	Denis Pervushin	21	0	14+6	0	1	0	0	0
	DF	(Russia) RUS	Pyotr Sedunov	3	0	1+2	0	0	0	0	0
	DF	(Russia) RUS	Vitali Tasenko	5	0	3+1	0	0	0	1	0
	DF	(Ukraine) UKR	Andriy Sydelnykov	1	0	1	0	0	0	0	0
	MF	(Russia) RUS	Yevgeny Ageyev	23	0	16+5	0	0	0	2	0
	MF	(Russia) RUS	Aleksandr Grishin	25	1	16+5	1	0+2	0	1+1	0
	MF	(Russia) RUS	Dmitri Karsakov	5	0	3+1	0	0	0	1	0
	MF	(Russia) RUS	Dmitri Kuznetsov	20	1	18	1	0	0	2	0
	MF	(Russia) RUS	Aleksei Savelyev	22	2	7+13	2	0+1	0	0+1	0
	MF	(Russia) RUS	Andrei Nikolayev	3	0	0+3	0	0	0	0	0
	MF	(Russia) RUS	Sergei Semak	34	7	32	5	0	0	2	2
	MF	(Russia) RUS	Igor Semshov	9	1	1+7	1	0+1	0	0	0
	MF	(Russia) RUS	Sergey Shustikov	28	1	26	1	2	0	0	0
	MF	(Turkmenistan) TKM	Dmitri Khomukha	35	5	32	4	2	0	1	1
	FW	(Russia) RUS	Sergey Korovushkin	8	0	0+7	0	0	0	0+1	0
	FW	(Russia) RUS	Sergei Kulichenko	6	1	1+5	1	0	0	0	0
	FW	(Russia) RUS	Vladimir Kulik	33	11	29	9	2	2	2	0
	FW	(Russia) RUS	Andrey Movsisyan	21	1	5+12	1	2	0	0+2	0
Players out on loan:
	MF	(Russia) RUS	Andrei Tsaplin	8	0	0+6	0	0+2	0	0	0
	MF	(Ukraine) UKR	Oleksandr Shutov	8	0	4+3	0	1	0	0	0
Players who left CSKA Moscow during the season:
	DF	(Georgia (country)) GEO	Nugzar Lobzhanidze	12	0	10	0	2	0	0	0
	DF	(Ukraine) UKR	Dmytro Yakovenko	3	0	2+1	0	0	0	0	0
	MF	(Armenia) ARM	Tigran Petrosyants	5	0	2+3	0	0	0	0	0
	MF	(Russia) RUS	Dmitry Ulyanov	15	1	11+2	1	2	0	0	0
	FW	(Russia) RUS	Aleksei Gerasimov	30	2	16+10	2	2	0	2	0
	FW	(Ukraine) UKR	Andriy Demchenko	9	2	9	2	0	0	0	0

=== Goal scorers ===
Place	Position	Nation	Name	Top League	1996–97 Russian Cup	1997–98 Russian Cup	Total
1	FW	(Russia)	Vladimir Kulik	9	2	0	11
2	MF	(Russia)	Sergei Semak	5	0	2	7
3	MF	(Turkmenistan)	Dmitri Khomukha	4	0	1	5
4	FW	(Ukraine)	Andriy Demchenko	2	0	0	2
4	MF	(Russia)	Aleksei Savelyev	2	0	0	2
4	FW	(Russia)	Aleksei Gerasimov	2	0	0	2
8	MF	(Russia)	Dmitry Ulyanov	1	0	0	1
8	MF	(Russia)	Igor Semshov	1	0	0	1
8	FW	(Russia)	Andrey Movsisyan	1	0	0	1
8	MF	(Russia)	Dmitri Kuznetsov	1	0	0	1
8	MF	(Russia)	Sergey Shustikov	1	0	0	1
8	FW	(Russia)	Sergei Kulichenko	1	0	0	1
8	MF	(Russia)	Aleksandr Grishin	1	0	0	1
			TOTALS	31	2	3	33

=== Disciplinary record ===
Nation	Position	Name	Top League		1996–97 Russian Cup		1997–98 Russian Cup		Total	
Nation	Position	Name	Booked	Sent off (straight red)	Booked	Sent off (straight red)	Booked	Sent off (straight red)	Booked	Sent off (straight red)
(Azerbaijan)	DF	Deni Gaisumov	3	0	0	0	0	0	3	0
(Russia)	DF	Maksim Bokov	7	0	0	0	1	0	8	0
(Russia)	DF	Sergei Mamchur	2	1	0	0	1	0	3	1
(Russia)	DF	Denis Pervushin	4	1	1	0	0	0	5	1
(Russia)	DF	Vitali Tasenko	2	0	0	0	0	0	2	0
(Armenia)	MF	Tigran Petrosyants	1	0	0	0	0	0	1	0
(Russia)	MF	Yevgeny Ageyev	3	0	0	0	1	0	4	0
(Russia)	MF	Aleksandr Grishin	4	0	0	0	0	0	4	0
(Russia)	MF	Dmitri Kuznetsov	1	0	0	0	2	0	3	0
(Russia)	MF	Sergei Semak	1	0	0	0	2	1	3	1
(Russia)	MF	Igor Semshov	1	0	0	0	0	0	1	0
(Russia)	MF	Sergey Shustikov	3	1	0	0	0	0	3	1
(Russia)	FW	Sergey Korovushkin	2	0	0	0	0	0	2	0
(Russia)	FW	Vladimir Kulik	3	0	0	0	1	0	4	0
(Russia)	FW	Andrey Movsisyan	1	0	1	0	0	0	2	0
Players out on loan :
Players who left CSKA Moscow during the season:
(Georgia (country))	DF	Nugzar Lobzhanidze	3	1	0	0	0	0	3	1
(Russia)	MF	Dmitry Ulyanov	3	0	1	0	0	0	4	0
(Russia)	FW	Aleksei Gerasimov	1	0	0	0	0	0	1	0
(Ukraine)	FW	Andriy Demchenko	2	0	0	0	0	0	2	0
		TOTALS	47	4	3	0	8	1	50	0
