= 1996 PFC CSKA Moscow season =

CSKA
1996 season
- Manager: Aleksandr Tarkhanov
- Stadium: Dynamo Stadium; Eduard Streltsov Stadium; Stroitel Stadium
- Top League: 5th
- Russian Cup: Quarterfinal vs Rotor Volgograd
- UEFA Cup: First round vs Feyenoord
- Top goalscorer: League: Two Players (10); All: Edgaras Jankauskas (11)

The 1996 CSKA season was the club's fifth season in the Russian Top League, the highest tier of association football in Russia.

== Squad ==
As of match played 3 November 1996

Name	Nationality	Position	Date of birth (age)	Signed from	Signed in	Contract ends	Apps.	Goals
Goalkeepers
Andrei Novosadov	(Russia)	GK	27 March 1972 (aged 24)	KAMAZ	1993		26	0
Dmitri Goncharov	(Russia)	GK	15 April 1975 (aged 21)	Academy	1996		3	0
Dmytro Tyapushkin	(Ukraine)	GK	6 November 1964 (aged 31)	Spartak Moscow	1996		35	0
Defenders
Andrėjus Tereškinas	(Lithuania)	DF	10 July 1970 (aged 26)	loan from Žalgiris Vilnius	1996		1	0
Yevgeni Bushmanov	(Russia)	DF	2 November 1971 (aged 25)	Spartak Moscow	1992		147	6
Sergei Mamchur	(Russia)	DF	3 February 1972 (aged 24)	Asmaral Moscow	1993		112	3
Denis Mashkarin	(Russia)	MF	17 May 1973 (aged 23)	Zenit St.Petersburg	1992		138	10
Valeri Minko	(Russia)	DF	8 August 1971 (aged 25)	Dynamo Barnaul	1989		137	10
Denis Pervushin	(Russia)	DF	18 January 1977 (aged 19)	TRASKO Moscow	1996		26	0
Midfielders
Leonidas	(Brazil)	MF	23 February 1975 (aged 21)	Corinthians	1996		13	7
Leandro Samarone	(Brazil)	MF	26 June 1971 (aged 25)	loan from Ituano	1996		17	2
Andrei Gashkin	(Russia)	MF	6 December 1970 (aged 25)	Chornomorets Odesa	1996		18	1
Dmitri Khokhlov	(Russia)	MF	22 December 1975 (aged 20)	Academy	1992		68	15
Sergei Semak	(Russia)	MF	27 February 1976 (aged 20)	Asmaral Moscow	1994		67	14
Igor Semshov	(Russia)	MF	6 April 1978 (aged 18)	Academy	1996		2	0
Oleksandr Shutov	(Ukraine)	MF	12 June 1975 (aged 21)	Rostselmash	1996		20	0
Forwards
Edgaras Jankauskas	(Lithuania)	FW	12 March 1975 (aged 21)	Žalgiris Vilnius	1996		22	11
Aleksei Gerasimov	(Russia)	FW	13 January 1973 (aged 23)	Lokomotiv Nizhny Novgorod	1995		55	16
Vladimir Lebed	(Russia)	FW	17 August 1973 (aged 23)	Oulu	1995		25	7
Andrey Movsisyan	(Russia)	FW	27 October 1975 (aged 21)	Spartak-d Moscow	1996		8	4
Out on loan
Andrei Tsaplin	(Russia)	DF	22 January 1977 (aged 19)	Academy	1996		2	0
Left During the Season
Andrei Ivanov	(Russia)	DF	6 April 1967 (aged 29)	Spartak Moscow	1996		26	0
Dmitri Karsakov	(Russia)	MF	29 December 1971 (aged 24)	Torpedo Moscow	1995		115	22
Vladislav Radimov	(Russia)	MF	26 November 1975 (aged 20)	Smena-Saturn Saint Petersburg	1992		78	16
Dmitry Ulyanov	(Russia)	MF	28 October 1970 (aged 25)	Torpedo Moscow	1995		42	5
Oleh Pestryakov	(Ukraine)	MF	5 August 1974 (aged 22)	CSKA-Borysfen	1996		2	0
Yuri Matveyev	(Russia)	FW	8 June 1967 (aged 29)	Uralmash Yekaterinburg	1996		16	2
Oleg Sergeyev	(Russia)	FW	29 March 1968 (aged 28)	Rotor Volgograd	1989		90	26

== Transfers ==
In: Note: Flags indicate national team as defined under FIFA eligibility rules; some limited exceptions apply. Players may hold more than one non-FIFA nationality.

No.	Pos.	Nation	Player
—	GK	UKR	Dmytro Tyapushkin (from (Russia) Spartak Moscow)
—	DF	LTU	Andrėjus Tereškinas (loan from (Lithuania) Žalgiris Vilnius)
—	DF	RUS	Andrei Ivanov (from (Russia) Spartak Moscow)
—	MF	BRA	Leonidas (from (Brazil) Corinthians)
—	MF	BRA	Leandro Samarone (loan from (Brazil) Ituano)
—	MF	RUS	Andrei Gashkin (from (Ukraine) Chornomorets Odesa)
—	MF	UKR	Oleh Pestryakov (from (Ukraine) CSKA-Borysfen Boryspil)
—	MF	UKR	Oleksandr Shutov (from (Russia) Rostselmash)
—	FW	RUS	Yuri Matveyev (from (Russia) Uralmash Yekaterinburg)
—	FW	RUS	Andrey Movsisyan (from (Russia) Spartak-d Moscow)
—	FW	LTU	Edgaras Jankauskas (from (Lithuania) Žalgiris Vilnius)
—	FW	RUS	Oleg Sergeyev (loan return from (Saudi Arabia) Al-Ittihad)

Out: Note: Flags indicate national team as defined under FIFA eligibility rules; some limited exceptions apply. Players may hold more than one non-FIFA nationality.

No.	Pos.	Nation	Player
—	GK	RUS	Yevgeni Plotnikov (to (Spain) Albacete)
—	DF	AZE	Deni Gaisumov (to (Russia) Sokol Saratov)
—	DF	RUS	Valeri Glushakov (to (Kazakhstan) Munaishy)
—	DF	RUS	Dmitri Gradilenko (to (Russia) Rostselmash)
—	DF	RUS	Aleksei Guschin (to (Russia) Dynamo Moscow)
—	DF	RUS	Andrei Ivanov (to (Austria) Tirol Innsbruck)
—	DF	RUS	Dmitri Shirshakov (to (Russia) Saturn Ramenskoye)
—	DF	RUS	Andrei Tsaplin (loan to (Russia) Arsenal Tula)
—	MF	ARM	Tigran Petrosyants (to (Russia) Zhemchuzhina-Sochi)
—	MF	BLR	Yuri Antonovich (to (Russia) Rostselmash)
—	MF	RUS	Dmitri Karsakov (to (South Korea) Bucheon Yukong)
—	MF	RUS	Vladislav Radimov (to (Spain) Real Zaragoza)
—	MF	RUS	Dmitri Shoukov (to (Netherlands) Vitesse Arnhem)
—	MF	RUS	Dmitry Ulyanov (to (Spain) Racing Santander)
—	MF	UKR	Oleh Pestryakov (from (Ukraine) CSKA Kyiv)
—	FW	RUS	Yuri Matveyev (to (South Korea) Suwon Samsung Bluewings)
—	FW	RUS	Oleg Sergeyev (to (Russia) Alania Vladikavkaz)

== Competitions ==
=== Top League ===
==== Results by round ====
Round	1	2	3	4	5	6	7	8	9	10	11	12	13	14	15	16	17	18	19	20	21	22	23	24	25	26	27	28	29	30	31	32	33	34
Ground	A	H	H	A	A	A	H	A	H	A	H	A	H	A	H	A	H	H	H	A	H	A	A	H	H	A	H	A	H	A	H	A	H	A
Result	L	W	W	W	W	L	D	W	D	W	W	D	W	W	D	L	L	D	W	W	D	W	L	L	W	W	W	W	W	W	W	L	L	W

Updated to match(es) played on 3 November 1996. Source: See Results
A = Away; H = Home; W = Win; D = Draw; L = Loss

==== Results ====
2 March 1996 1	Rotor Volgograd	2 – 0	CSKA Moscow	Volgograd
MSK (UTC+3)	Tishchenko 5'; Niederhaus 53'	Report		Stadium: Central Profsoyuz Stadium; Referee: Lom-Ali Ibragimov

9 March 1996 2	CSKA Moscow	3 – 1	Lada-Togliatti	Moscow
17:00 MSK (UTC+3)	Radimov 19' (pen.); Khokhlov 42'; Karsakov 61'	Report	Miroshnichenko (penalty missed) 63'; Nikitin 58'	Stadium: Eduard Streltsov Stadium; Referee: G.Kulichenkov

16 March 1996 3	CSKA Moscow	2 – 0	Lokomotiv Nizhny Novgorod	Moscow
16:00 MSK (UTC+3)	Gerasimov 5'; Radimov 22'; Mamchur (yellow card) 68'	Report	Kashentsev (yellow card) 48'; Kazakov (yellow card) 77'	Stadium: Eduard Streltsov Stadium; Referee: Yuri Chebotaryov

23 March 1996 4	Energiya-Tekstilshchik Kamyshin	1 – 2	CSKA Moscow	Kamyshin
16:00 MSK (UTC+3)	Abramov (yellow card) 13'; Gagloyev 31'; Lyapkin (yellow card) 49'; Konovalov (yellow card) 71'	Report	Radimov 14' (pen.); Khokhlov (red card) 72'; Bushmanov (yellow card) 72'; Gerasimov (yellow card) 76' (goal) 90'; Minko (yellow card) 89'	Stadium: Tekstilshchik Stadium; Referee: Sergey Lapochkin

30 March 1996 5	Uralmash Yekaterinburg	0 – 1	CSKA Moscow	Yekaterinburg
MSK (UTC+4)	Bakhtin (yellow card) 31'; Ratnichkin (yellow card) 64'; Khankeyev (yellow card) 70'	Report	Minko 53'; Lebed (yellow card) 85'	Stadium: Central Stadium; Referee: Nikolai Levnikov

6 April 1996 6	Krylia Sovetov	1 – 0	CSKA Moscow	Samara
MSK (UTC+4)	Bulatov 15' (yellow card) 86'	Report		Stadium: Metallurg Stadium; Referee: S.Gusev

13 April 1996 7	CSKA Moscow	0 – 0	Spartak Moscow	Moscow
17:00 MSK (UTC+4)	Semak (yellow card) 71'	Report	Chudin (yellow card) 40'	Stadium: Dynamo Stadium; Referee: A.Malyarov

20 April 1996 8	KAMAZ	0 – 2	CSKA Moscow	Naberezhnye Chelny
17:00 MSK (UTC+4)	Yevdokimov (yellow card) 43'; Zubkov (yellow card) 44'	Report	Semak (yellow card) 43'; Ivanov (yellow card) 61'; Gerasimov 71', 80'	Stadium: KAMAZ Stadium; Referee: N.Frolov

27 April 1996 9	CSKA Moscow	1 – 1	Dynamo Moscow	Moscow
16:50 MSK (UTC+4)	Khokhlov 29'; Bushmanov (yellow card) 64'; Radimov (yellow card) 65'	Report	Grishin (yellow card) 38'; Cheryshev 41' (yellow card) 42'; Kobelev (penalty missed) 77'	Stadium: Dynamo Stadium; Referee: V.Ovchinnikov

4 May 1996 10	Torpedo Moscow	2 – 3	CSKA Moscow	Moscow
17:00 MSK (UTC+4)	Kamoltsev 40'; Vostrosablin 88' (pen.); Kamnev (yellow card) 90'	Report	Semak 9', 82'; Matveyev 19'; Shutov (yellow card) 62'; Radimov (yellow card) 90'	Stadium: Eduard Streltsov Stadium; Referee: A.Butenko

8 May 1996 11	CSKA Moscow	4 – 2	Rostselmash	Moscow
19:00 MSK (UTC+4)	Ulyanov 13'; Khokhlov 63'; Mamchur (yellow card) 41'; Gerasimov 65'; Mashkarin 87'	Report	Loskov 28', 42'; Gerasimenko (yellow card) 45'	Stadium: Dynamo Stadium; Referee: V.Yaprintsev

15 May 1996 12	Zenit St.Petersburg	1 – 1	CSKA Moscow	Saint Petersburg
18:00 MSK (UTC+4)	Yeryomin 72'	Report	Khokhlov 48'	Stadium: Petrovsky Stadium; Referee: Lom-Ali Ibragimov

18 May 1996 13	CSKA Moscow	3 – 0	Zhemchuzhina-Sochi	Moscow
17:00 MSK (UTC+4)	Gerasimov 8'; Radimov 30' (pen.); Matveyev 51'	Report	Novgorodov (red card) 41'	Stadium: Dynamo Stadium; Referee: G.Kulichenkov

3 July 1996 14	Alania Vladikavkaz	0 – 1	CSKA Moscow	Vladikavkaz
MSK (UTC+4)	Timofeev (yellow card) 23'; Datdeyev (yellow card) 69'	Report	Semak (yellow card) 33'; Mamchur (yellow card) 60'; Khokhlov 76'	Stadium: Republican Spartak Stadium; Referee: N.Frolov

7 July 1996 15	CSKA Moscow	0 – 0	Baltika Kaliningrad	Moscow
17:00 MSK (UTC+4)	Bushmanov (yellow card) 43'; Tsaplin (yellow card) 54' (red card) 81'	Report	Ajinjal (yellow card) 71'; Malay (yellow card) 80'	Stadium: Dynamo Stadium; Referee: G.Kulichenkov

10 July 1996 16	Chernomorets Novorossiysk	2 – 1	CSKA Moscow	Novorossiysk
MSK (UTC+4)	Berezner 43'; Doguzov 51' (pen.); Gerasimov (yellow card) 76'	Report	Gerasimov 17'; Ulyanov (yellow card) 39'; Mamchur (yellow card) 77'	Stadium: Central Stadium; Referee: Aleksandr Lapin

17 July 1996 17	CSKA Moscow	1 – 3	Lokomotiv Moscow	Moscow
18:00 MSK (UTC+4)	Semak 30'; Mashkarin (yellow card) 49'; Matveyev (yellow card) 66'	Report	Smirnov 42'; Hovhannisyan 52'; Janashia (yellow card) 52'; Yelyshev 54'; Drozdov (yellow card) 65'; Kharlachyov (yellow card) 89'	Stadium: Dynamo Stadium; Referee: S.Zuev

20 July 1996 18	CSKA Moscow	2 – 2	Tekstilshchik Kamyshin	Moscow
17:00 MSK (UTC+4)	Karsakov 44'; Jankauskas 68'; Ulyanov (yellow card) 90'	Report	Matviyenko (yellow card) 9' (red card) 88'; Natalushko 53'; Suanov 67'	Stadium: Dynamo Stadium; Referee: G.Kulichenkov

24 July 1996 19	CSKA Moscow	1 – 0	Rotor Volgograd	Moscow
18:00 MSK (UTC+4)	Gerasimov 79'; Semak (yellow card) 82'	Report	Zernov (yellow card) 59'	Stadium: Dynamo Stadium; Referee: S.Gusev

31 July 1996 20	Lada-Togliatti	0 – 2	CSKA Moscow	Tolyatti
MSK (UTC+4)		Report	Jankauskas 13', 87'; Ulyanov (yellow card) 25'	Stadium: Torpedo Stadium; Referee: Lom-Ali Ibragimov

3 August 1996 21	CSKA Moscow	1 – 1	Uralmash Yekaterinburg	Moscow
17:00 MSK (UTC+4)	Shutov (yellow card) 22'; Leonidas 68'	Report	Khankeyev (yellow card) 19'; Morozov 36'; Litvinov (yellow card) 39'; Bakunin (yellow card) 79'	Stadium: Dynamo Stadium; Referee: Nikolai Levnikov

10 August 1996 22	Lokomotiv Nizhny Novgorod	1 – 3	CSKA Moscow	Nizhny Novgorod
MSK (UTC+4)	Rapeika (yellow card) 9'; Hetsko (yellow card) 33'; Mukhamadiev 89' (pen.)	Report	Samarone 13'; Khokhlov 52' (yellow card) 57'; Leonidas 64'; Gashkin (yellow card) 67'	Stadium: Lokomotiv Stadium; Referee: V.Yaprintsev

14 August 1996 23	Spartak Moscow	3 – 1	CSKA Moscow	Moscow
19:00 MSK (UTC+4)	Gorlukovich (yellow card) 2'; Chudin (yellow card) 31'; Alenichev 33', 66'; Shirko 74'	Report	Jankauskas 9'; Gashkin (yellow card) 38'; Pestryakov (yellow card) 82'; Mashkarin (yellow card) 85'	Stadium: Luzhniki Stadium; Referee: Sergei Khusainov

17 August 1996 24	CSKA Moscow	1 – 2	Krylia Sovetov	Moscow
17:00 MSK (UTC+4)	Bushmanov (yellow card) 64'; Leonidas 80'	Report	Averyanov (yellow card) 30'; Safronov 44' (yellow card) 90'; Avalyan 53'	Stadium: Dynamo Stadium; Referee: S.Gusev

24 August 1996 25	CSKA Moscow	4 – 2	KAMAZ	Moscow
17:00 MSK (UTC+4)	Jankauskas 6', 87'; Leonidas (yellow card) 24' (goal) 52' (pen.); Khokhlov 76'; Pervushin (yellow card) 81'	Report	Tropaneț (yellow card) 31' (goal) 57'; Klontsak (yellow card) 58'; Zayarnyi 72'; Yefremov (yellow card) 78'	Stadium: Dynamo Stadium; Referee: Nikolai Ivanov

5 September 1996 32	Dynamo Moscow	2 – 3	CSKA Moscow	Moscow
19:00 MSK (UTC+4)	Guschin (yellow card) 11'; Teryokhin 76'; Cheryshev 79'; Kovtun (yellow card) 85'	Report	Semak 18'; Khokhlov 49'; Samarone (yellow card) 80'; Mashkarin 90'	Stadium: Dynamo Stadium; Referee: G.Zhafyarov

15 September 1996 34	CSKA Moscow	2 – 0	Torpedo Moscow	Moscow
MSK (UTC+4)	Ivanov (yellow card) 25'; Khokhlov 55'; Semak 90'	Report		Stadium: Eduard Streltsov Stadium; Referee: A.Kozhukhov

19 September 1996 33	Rostselmash	0 – 5	CSKA Moscow	Rostov-on-Don
17:00 MSK (UTC+4)	Ageyev (yellow card) 63'	Report	Semak 11' (pen.); Jankauskas 20'; Gerasimov 27'; Khokhlov 60'; Movsisyan 87'	Stadium: Olimp-2; Referee: Nikolai Levnikov

28 September 1996 26	CSKA Moscow	1 – 0	Zenit St.Petersburg	Moscow
17:00 MSK (UTC+4)	Minko (yellow card) 36'; Gashkin 50'; Leonidas (penalty missed) 62'; Ivanov (yellow card) 81'	Report	Kondrashov (yellow card) 11'; Danilov (yellow card) 17'	Stadium: Dynamo Stadium; Referee: I.Siner

2 October 1996 27	Zhemchuzhina-Sochi	0 – 1	CSKA Moscow	Sochi
MSK (UTC+4)	Sanko (yellow card) 32'	Report	Jankauskas 3'; Mashkarin (yellow card) 43'; Pervushin (yellow card) 48'; Ivanov (yellow card) 67'	Stadium: Sochi Central Stadium; Referee: G.Kulichenkov

12 October 1996 28	CSKA Moscow	2 – 0	Alania Vladikavkaz	Moscow
MSK (UTC+4)	Samarone 40'; Mashkarin (yellow card) 49'; Movsisyan 63'	Report	Suleymanov (yellow card) 30'; Kornienko (yellow card) 45'; Dzhioyev (yellow card) 51' (red card) 66'; Sikoyev (yellow card) 84'	Stadium: Eduard Streltsov Stadium; Referee: N.Frolov

19 October 1996 29	Baltika Kaliningrad	2 – 1	CSKA Moscow	Kaliningrad
16:00 MSK (UTC+4)	Ajinjal (yellow card) 39'; Baranov 54'; Bulatov (yellow card) 58'; Shukanov 71'	Report	Semak (yellow card) 30'; Leonidas (yellow card) 51' (goal) 89'; Ivanov (yellow card) 67'	Stadium: Baltika Stadium; Referee: Taras Bezubyak

25 October 1996 30	CSKA Moscow	1 – 3	Chernomorets Novorossiysk	Selyatino
15:00 MSK (UTC+3)	Jankauskas 57'	Report	Yepiskoposyan (yellow card) 37'; Doguzov 42' (pen.); Berezner 52', 72'	Stadium: Stroitel Stadium; Referee: Lom-Ali Ibragimov

3 November 1996 31	Lokomotiv Moscow	1 – 2	CSKA Moscow	Moscow
17:00 MSK (UTC+3)	Veselov 57'; Arifullin (yellow card) 69'; Pashinin (yellow card) 87'	Report	Leonidas 55'; Gerasimov 62'; Minko (yellow card) 71'	Stadium: Lokomotiv Stadium; Referee: V.Filippov

==== Table ====
Pos	Team	Pld	W	D	L	GF	GA	GD	Pts	Qualification or relegation
3	Rotor Volgograd	34	21	7	6	58	27	+31	70	Qualification to UEFA Cup second qualifying round
4	Dynamo Moscow	34	20	7	7	60	35	+25	67	Qualification to Intertoto Cup group stage
5	CSKA Moscow	34	20	6	8	58	35	+23	66	
6	Lokomotiv Moscow	34	15	10	9	46	31	+15	55	Qualification to Cup Winners' Cup first round
7	Baltika Kaliningrad	34	12	10	12	44	35	+9	46	

Source: rsssf.com
Rules for classification: 1) points; 2) goal difference; 3) number of goals scored.

=== Russian Cup ===
==== 1995-96 ====
17 April 1996 Quarterfinal	Rotor Volgograd	2 – 0	CSKA Moscow	Volgograd
19:00 MSK (UTC+4)	Veretennikov 33'; Niederhaus 89'	Report		Stadium: Central Profsoyuz Stadium; Attendance: 19,000; Referee: Taras Bezubyak

=== UEFA Cup ===
6 August 1996 Qualifying round 1st leg	ÍA (Iceland)	0–2	(Russia) CSKA Moscow	Akranes, Iceland
21:00 MSK (UTC+4)	Haraldsson (yellow card) 61'; S.Tordarsson (yellow card) 90'	Report	Khokhlov (yellow card) 20'; Karsakov 34'; Jankauskas 37'; Bushmanov (yellow card) 66'; Pervushin (yellow card) 87'	Stadium: Akranesvöllur; Attendance: 1,100; Referee: Finn Lambek (Denmark)

20 August 1996 Qualifying round 2nd leg	CSKA Moscow (Russia)	4–1 (6–1 agg.)	(Iceland) ÍA	Moscow, Russia
14:00 MSK (UTC+4)	Movsisyan 35', 40'; Leonidas 53'; Jankauskas 62'; Khokhlov (yellow card) 90'	Report	Högnason 80'; O.Adolfsson (yellow card) 90'; Gislason (yellow card) 90'	Stadium: Dynamo Stadium; Attendance: 3,000; Referee: Vančo Kocev (Macedonia)

10 September 1996 First round 1st leg	CSKA Moscow (Russia)	0–1	(Netherlands) Feyenoord	Moscow, Russia
21:00 MSK (UTC+4)	Pervushin (yellow card) 76'	Report	Larsson (yellow card) 26' van Gastel (yellow card) 32'; G.Klais (yellow card) 45'; Fraser (yellow card) 64' van Wonderen 82'	Stadium: Dynamo Stadium; Referee: Rune Pedersen (Norway)

24 September 1996 First round 2nd leg	Feyenoord (Netherlands)	1–1 (2–1 agg.)	(Russia) CSKA Moscow	Rotterdam, Netherlands
22:30 MSK (UTC+4)	Boateng (yellow card) 34'; Koeman (yellow card) 59' van Wonderen 72'	Report	Khokhlov (yellow card) 21'; Minko 57'; Ivanov (yellow card) 70'	Stadium: De Kuip; Referee: J.Korouad

== Squad statistics ==
As of match played 3 November 1996

=== Appearances and goals ===
No.	Pos	Nat	Player	Total		Top League		1995–96 Russian Cup		1996–97 UEFA Cup	
No.	Pos	Nat	Player	Apps	Goals	Apps	Goals	Apps	Goals	Apps	Goals
	GK	(Russia) RUS	Dmitri Goncharov	3	0	1+1	0	0	0	0+1	0
	GK	(Russia) RUS	Andrei Novosadov	3	0	3	0	0	0	0	0
	GK	(Ukraine) UKR	Dmytro Tyapushkin	35	0	30	0	1	0	4	0
	DF	(Lithuania) LTU	Andrėjus Tereškinas	1	0	0	0	0	0	0+1	0
	DF	(Russia) RUS	Yevgeni Bushmanov	35	0	31	0	1	0	3	0
	DF	(Russia) RUS	Sergei Mamchur	25	0	19+6	0	0	0	0	0
	DF	(Russia) RUS	Denis Mashkarin	29	2	20+4	2	0+1	0	4	0
	DF	(Russia) RUS	Valeri Minko	38	2	33	1	1	0	4	1
	DF	(Russia) RUS	Denis Pervushin	26	0	12+10	0	1	0	1+2	0
	MF	(Brazil) BRA	Leonidas	13	7	5+4	6	0	0	3+1	1
	MF	(Brazil) BRA	Leandro Samarone	17	2	12+1	2	0	0	4	0
	MF	(Russia) RUS	Andrei Gashkin	18	1	13+3	1	0	0	2	0
	MF	(Russia) RUS	Dmitri Khokhlov	33	10	30	10	0	0	3	0
	MF	(Russia) RUS	Sergei Semak	36	6	31	6	1	0	4	0
	MF	(Russia) RUS	Igor Semshov	2	0	0+2	0	0	0	0	0
	MF	(Ukraine) UKR	Oleksandr Shutov	20	0	7+10	0	0	0	2+1	0
	FW	(Lithuania) LTU	Edgaras Jankauskas	22	11	16+2	9	0	0	4	2
	FW	(Russia) RUS	Aleksei Gerasimov	36	10	24+7	10	1	0	3+1	0
	FW	(Russia) RUS	Vladimir Lebed	8	0	5+2	0	0+1	0	0	0
	FW	(Russia) RUS	Andrey Movsisyan	8	4	3+4	2	0	0	0+1	2
Players out on loan:
	DF	(Russia) RUS	Andrei Tsaplin	2	0	0+2	0	0	0	0	0
Players who left CSKA Moscow during the season:
	DF	(Russia) RUS	Andrei Ivanov	26	0	21+2	0	1	0	2	0
	MF	(Russia) RUS	Dmitri Karsakov	25	3	22+1	2	1	0	1	1
	MF	(Russia) RUS	Vladislav Radimov	13	4	11+1	4	1	0	0	0
	MF	(Russia) RUS	Dmitry Ulyanov	20	1	16+2	1	1	0	0+1	0
	MF	(Ukraine) UKR	Oleh Pestryakov	2	0	0+2	0	0	0	0	0
	FW	(Russia) RUS	Yuri Matveyev	16	2	8+7	2	0+1	0	0	0
	FW	(Russia) RUS	Oleg Sergeyev	4	0	1+2	0	1	0	0	0

=== Goal scorers ===
Place	Position	Nation	Name	Top League	1995–96 Russian Cup	1996–97 UEFA Cup	Total
1	FW	(Lithuania)	Edgaras Jankauskas	9	0	2	11
2	MF	(Russia)	Dmitri Khokhlov	10	0	0	10
2	FW	(Russia)	Aleksei Gerasimov	10	0	0	10
4	MF	(Brazil)	Leonidas	6	0	1	7
5	MF	(Russia)	Sergei Semak	6	0	0	6
6	MF	(Russia)	Vladislav Radimov	4	0	0	4
6	FW	(Russia)	Andrey Movsisyan	2	0	2	4
8	MF	(Russia)	Dmitri Karsakov	2	0	1	3
9	FW	(Russia)	Yuri Matveyev	2	0	0	2
9	DF	(Russia)	Denis Mashkarin	2	0	0	2
9	MF	(Brazil)	Leandro Samarone	2	0	0	2
9	DF	(Russia)	Valeri Minko	1	0	1	2
13	MF	(Russia)	Dmitry Ulyanov	1	0	0	1
13	MF	(Russia)	Andrei Gashkin	1	0	0	1
			TOTALS	58	0	7	65

=== Disciplinary record ===
Nation	Position	Name	Top League		1995–96 Russian Cup		1996–97 UEFA Cup		Total	
Nation	Position	Name	Booked	Sent off (straight red)	Booked	Sent off (straight red)	Booked	Sent off (straight red)	Booked	Sent off (straight red)
(Russia)	DF	Yevgeni Bushmanov	4	0	0	0	1	0	5	0
(Russia)	DF	Sergei Mamchur	4	0	0	0	0	0	4	0
(Russia)	DF	Denis Mashkarin	4	0	0	0	0	0	4	0
(Russia)	DF	Valeri Minko	3	0	0	0	0	0	3	0
(Russia)	DF	Denis Pervushin	2	0	0	0	2	0	4	0
(Brazil)	MF	Leonidas	2	0	0	0	0	0	2	0
(Brazil)	MF	Leandro Samarone	1	0	0	0	0	0	1	0
(Russia)	MF	Andrei Gashkin	2	0	0	0	0	0	2	0
(Russia)	MF	Dmitri Khokhlov	1	1	0	0	3	0	4	1
(Russia)	MF	Sergei Semak	5	0	0	0	0	0	5	0
(Ukraine)	MF	Oleh Pestryakov	1	0	0	0	0	0	1	0
(Ukraine)	MF	Oleksandr Shutov	2	0	0	0	0	0	2	0
(Russia)	FW	Aleksei Gerasimov	1	0	0	0	0	0	1	0
(Russia)	FW	Vladimir Lebed	1	0	0	0	0	0	1	0
(Russia)	FW	Yuri Matveyev	1	0	0	0	0	0	1	0
Players out on loan :
(Russia)	DF	Andrei Tsaplin	2	1	0	0	0	0	2	1
Players who left CSKA Moscow during the season:
(Russia)	DF	Andrei Ivanov	5	0	0	0	1	0	6	0
(Russia)	MF	Vladislav Radimov	2	0	0	0	0	0	2	0
(Russia)	MF	Dmitry Ulyanov	3	0	0	0	0	0	3	0
		TOTALS	46	2	0	0	7	0	53	2
