= 1995 PFC CSKA Moscow season =

CSKA
1995 season
- Manager: Aleksandr Tarkhanov
- Stadium: Dynamo Stadium; Eduard Streltsov Stadium; Lokomotiv Stadium
- Top League: 6th
- Russian Cup: Continued in 1996
- Top goalscorer: League: Dmitri Karsakov (10); All: Dmitri Karsakov (11)

The 1995 CSKA season was the club's fourth season in the Russian Top League, the highest tier of association football in Russia.

== Squad ==
As of match played 4 November 1995

Name	Nationality	Position	Date of birth (age)	Signed from	Signed in	Contract ends	Apps.	Goals
Goalkeepers
Andrei Novosadov	(Russia)	GK	27 March 1972 (aged 23)	KAMAZ	1993		23	0
Yevgeni Plotnikov	(Russia)	GK	6 September 1972 (aged 23)	Kuban Krasnodar	1993		75	0
Defenders
Deni Gaisumov	(Azerbaijan)	DF	6 February 1968 (aged 27)	Erzu Grozny	1995		10	2
Yevgeni Bushmanov	(Russia)	DF	2 November 1971 (aged 24)	Spartak Moscow	1992		112	6
Valeri Glushakov	(Russia)	DF	17 March 1959 (aged 36)	Kuusysi	1995		14	0
Dmitri Gradilenko	(Russia)	DF	12 August 1969 (aged 26)	Lada-Togliatti	1995		21	1
Aleksei Guschin	(Russia)	DF	21 October 1971 (aged 24)	Trainee	1989		81	2
Sergei Mamchur	(Russia)	DF	3 February 1972 (aged 23)	Asmaral Moscow	1993		87	3
Valeri Minko	(Russia)	DF	8 August 1971 (aged 24)	Dynamo Barnaul	1989		99	8
Dmitri Shirshakov	(Russia)	DF	14 November 1973 (aged 21)	Trainee	1992		8	0
Midfielders
Tigran Petrosyants	(Armenia)	MF	23 December 1973 (aged 21)	Kotayk	1995		9	0
Yuri Antonovich	(Belarus)	MF	2 June 1967 (aged 28)	Dinamo Minsk	1993		87	5
Dmitri Karsakov	(Russia)	MF	29 December 1971 (aged 23)	Torpedo Moscow	1995		90	19
Dmitri Khokhlov	(Russia)	MF	22 December 1975 (aged 19)	Trainee	1992		35	5
Denis Mashkarin	(Russia)	MF	17 May 1973 (aged 22)	Zenit St.Petersburg	1992		109	8
Vladislav Radimov	(Russia)	MF	26 November 1975 (aged 19)	Smena-Saturn Saint Petersburg	1992		65	12
Sergei Semak	(Russia)	MF	27 February 1976 (aged 19)	Asmaral Moscow	1994		31	8
Dmitri Shoukov	(Russia)	MF	26 September 1975 (aged 20)	Trainee	1993		38	1
Dmitry Ulyanov	(Russia)	MF	28 October 1970 (aged 25)	Torpedo Moscow	1995		22	4
Forwards
Aleksei Gerasimov	(Russia)	FW	13 January 1973 (aged 22)	Lokomotiv Nizhny Novgorod	1995		19	6
Vladimir Lebed	(Russia)	FW	17 August 1973 (aged 22)	Oulu	1995		17	7
Out on loan
Oleg Sergeyev	(Russia)	FW	29 March 1968 (aged 27)	Rotor Volgograd	1989		86	26
Left During the Season
Ilshat Faizulin	(Russia)	FW	5 March 1973 (aged 22)	Trainee	1989		124	28
Roman Oreshchuk	(Russia)	FW	2 September 1975 (aged 20)	Chernomorets Novorossiysk	1995		2	0

== Transfers ==
In: Note: Flags indicate national team as defined under FIFA eligibility rules; some limited exceptions apply. Players may hold more than one non-FIFA nationality.

No.	Pos.	Nation	Player
—	DF	AZE	Deni Gaisumov (from (Russia) Erzu Grozny)
—	DF	RUS	Valeri Glushakov (from (Finland) Kuusysi)
—	DF	RUS	Dmitri Gradilenko (from (Russia) Lada-Togliatti)
—	MF	ARM	Tigran Petrosyants (from (Armenia) Kotayk)
—	MF	RUS	Dmitri Karsakov (from (Russia) Torpedo Moscow)
—	MF	RUS	Dmitry Ulyanov (from (Russia) Torpedo Moscow)
—	FW	RUS	Aleksei Gerasimov (from (Russia) Lokomotiv Nizhny Novgorod)
—	FW	RUS	Vladimir Lebed (from (Finland) Oulu)
—	FW	RUS	Roman Oreshchuk (from (Russia) Chernomorets Novorossiysk)

Out: Note: Flags indicate national team as defined under FIFA eligibility rules; some limited exceptions apply. Players may hold more than one non-FIFA nationality.

No.	Pos.	Nation	Player
—	DF	RUS	Dmitri Bystrov (to (Russia) Zenit St.Petersburg)
—	DF	RUS	Sergei Kolotovkin (to (Russia) Dynamo Moscow)
—	DF	RUS	Mikhail Sinyov
—	MF	RUS	Aleksandr Grishin (to (Russia) Dynamo Moscow)
—	MF	RUS	Vasili Ivanov (to (Israel) Maccabi Herzliya)
—	MF	RUS	Vladimir Semyonov (to (Russia) Dynamo Moscow)
—	MF	RUS	Vladimir Tatarchuk (loan to (Saudi Arabia) Al-Ittihad)
—	MF	RUS	Valeri Broshin (to (Russia) Zenit St.Petersburg)
—	FW	RUS	Ilshat Faizulin (to (Spain) Racing Santander)
—	FW	RUS	Roman Oreshchuk (to (Russia) Rostselmash)
—	FW	RUS	Oleg Sergeyev (loan to (Saudi Arabia) Al-Ittihad)

== Competitions ==
=== Top League ===
==== Results by round ====
Round	1	2	3	4	5	6	7	8	9	10	11	12	13	14	15	16	17	18	19	20	21	22	23	24	25	26	27	28	29	30
Ground	A	H	H	H	A	H	H	A	H	A	H	A	H	A	A	H	A	H	A	H	A	H	A	A	H	A	A	H	H	A
Result	W	W	W	D	L	D	L	L	W	D	L	L	W	L	W	W	W	W	W	W	W	L	D	W	W	D	W	L	L	W

Updated to match(es) played on 26 October 1995. Source: See Results
A = Away; H = Home; W = Win; D = Draw; L = Loss

==== Results ====
1 April 1995 1	Chernomorets Novorossiysk	1 – 3	CSKA Moscow	Novorossiysk
17:00 MSK (UTC+4)	Dyshekov 59'	Report	Radimov 8'; Gradilenko (yellow card) 32'; Khokhlov 44'; 62'	Stadium: Central Stadium; Referee: Lom-Ali Ibragimov

8 April 1995 2	CSKA Moscow	2 – 1	Torpedo Moscow	Moscow
17:00 MSK (UTC+4)	Bushmanov (yellow card) 33'; Radimov (yellow card) 46'; Karsakov 71'; Gerasimov 82'	Report	Chumachenko (yellow card) 38' (goal) 40'	Stadium: Eduard Streltsov Stadium; Referee: V.Filippov

1 May 1995 3	CSKA Moscow	4 – 0	Rostselmash	Moscow
13:00 MSK (UTC+4)	Faizulin 42'; Lebed 64', 75' (pen.), 77' (pen.)	Report	Parovin (yellow card) 29'	Stadium: Dynamo Stadium; Referee: I.Siner

9 May 1995 5	CSKA Moscow	2 – 2	Tekstilshchik Kamyshin	Moscow
MSK (UTC+4)	Lebed 50'; Faizulin 70'	Report	Kurayev (yellow card) 32'; Morozov 48'; Abramov 68'	Stadium: Dynamo Stadium; Referee: Nikolai Levnikov

13 May 1995 6	Dynamo-Gazovik Tyumen	2 – 0	CSKA Moscow	Tyumen
17:00 MSK (UTC+4)	Kovardayev 23'; Hrytsyna (yellow card) 41'; Maslov (penalty missed) 45'; Kamoltsev 45'; Pryzetko (yellow card) 46'	Report	Novosadov (yellow card) 51'; Radimov (yellow card) 60'	Stadium: Geolog Stadium; Referee: V.Yarygin

20 May 1995 7	CSKA Moscow	2 – 2	KAMAZ	Moscow
MSK (UTC+4)	Gaisumov 22', 90' (yellow card) 80'	Report	Milenin (yellow card) 5'; Durnev 31', 78'; Gorbachyov (yellow card) 53'	Stadium: Dynamo Stadium; Referee: Taras Bezubyak

24 May 1995 8	CSKA Moscow	1 – 3	Dynamo Moscow	Moscow
MSK (UTC+4)	Bushmanov (yellow card) 19'; Lebed 52' (pen.); Radimov (yellow card) 59'	Report	Teryokhin 6' (pen.); A.Grishin (yellow card) 7' (goal) 18'; Sabitov (yellow card) 34' (goal) 83'; Kovtun (yellow card) 57' (red card) 90'; Smetanin (yellow card) 81'; Yakhimovich (yellow card) 84'	Stadium: Dynamo Stadium; Referee: Yu.Vergopulo

27 May 1995 9	Uralmash Yekaterinburg	1 – 0	CSKA Moscow	Yekaterinburg
MSK (UTC+4)	Khankeyev 78'	Report	Gaisumov (yellow card) 57'	Stadium: Central Stadium; Referee: Aleksandr Lapin

10 June 1995 10	CSKA Moscow	4 – 1	Krylia Sovetov	Moscow
MSK (UTC+4)	Bushmanov 65'; Karsakov 79'; Khokhlov 86'; Lebed 89'	Report	Shishkin (yellow card) 41'; Tsiklauri (yellow card) 58'; Rezantsev (yellow card) 61'; Bulatov 90'	Stadium: Dynamo Stadium; Referee: A.Markelov

17 June 1995 11	Lokomotiv Nizhny Novgorod	0 – 0	CSKA Moscow	Nizhny Novgorod
MSK (UTC+4)	Shurko (yellow card) 89'	Report		Stadium: Lokomotiv Stadium; Referee: Taras Bezubyak

24 June 1995 12	CSKA Moscow	1 – 4	Rotor Volgograd	Moscow
MSK (UTC+4)	Mamchur 33' (pen.); Khokhlov (yellow card) 88'	Report	Krivov 18', 54'; Niederhaus 35'; Veretennikov 80' (pen.)	Stadium: Eduard Streltsov Stadium; Referee: Yuri Chebotaryov

28 June 1995 13	Spartak Moscow	3 – 1	CSKA Moscow	Moscow
MSK (UTC+4)	Onopko 52'; Shmarov 56', 65'	Report	Mashkarin (yellow card) 27'; Radimov 78'	Stadium: Luzhniki Stadium; Referee: Sergei Khusainov

1 July 1995 14	CSKA Moscow	4 – 0	Zhemchuzhina-Sochi	Moscow
17:00 MSK (UTC+4)	Semak 6', 32'; Faizulin 10', 75'; Radimov (yellow card) 39'	Report	Bondarev (yellow card) 43' (yellow-red card) 69'	Stadium: Dynamo Stadium; Referee: Sergey Lapochkin

4 July 1995 4	Alania Vladikavkaz	2 – 1	CSKA Moscow	Vladikavkaz
MSK (UTC+4)	Suleymanov (penalty missed) 33'; Timofeev (yellow card) 38'; Tedeyev 73'; Kanishchev 85'; Pagayev (yellow card) 87'	Report	Faizulin 11'; Bushmanov (yellow card) 45'; Mamchur (yellow card) 49'; Gradilenko (yellow card) 56'	Stadium: Republican Spartak Stadium; Referee: G.Kulichenkov

8 July 1995 15	Lokomotiv Moscow	0 – 1	CSKA Moscow	Moscow
17:00 MSK (UTC+4)	Ayupov (yellow card) 87'	Report	Karsakov 53'; Radimov (yellow card) 80'	Stadium: Lokomotiv Stadium; Referee: V.Filippov

15 July 1995 16	CSKA Moscow	2 – 0	Uralmash Yekaterinburg	Moscow
MSK (UTC+4)	Gradilenko (yellow card) 5'; Karsakov 44'; Faizulin 89'	Report	A.Yushkov (yellow card) 5'; Zayets (yellow card) 45' (yellow-red card) 54'	Stadium: Dynamo Stadium; Referee: Yuri Chebotaryov

22 July 1995 17	Dynamo Moscow	0 – 1	CSKA Moscow	Moscow
MSK (UTC+4)	Kobelev (yellow card) 55'; Podpaly (yellow card) 72'	Report	Semak 48'; Mamchur (yellow card) 64'; Radimov (yellow card) 82'	Stadium: Dynamo Stadium; Referee: Valentin Ivanov

29 July 1995 18	CSKA Moscow	4 – 0	Lokomotiv Nizhny Novgorod	Moscow
MSK (UTC+4)	Karsakov 3'; Khokhlov 24'; Semak (yellow card) 31'; Antonovich (yellow card) 41'; Ulyanov 51' (pen.), 53' (pen.); Mashkarin (yellow card) 69'; Bushmanov (yellow card) 90'	Report	Konovalov (yellow card) 23'; Shurko (yellow card) 53'; Sudarikov (yellow card) 74'; Júnior (yellow card) 88'	Stadium: Dynamo Stadium; Referee: Taras Bezubyak

5 August 1995 19	Krylia Sovetov	1 – 2	CSKA Moscow	Samara
MSK (UTC+4)	Tsiklauri 47'; Matviyenko (yellow card) 74'	Report	Khokhlov 25'; Gradilenko (yellow card) 37'; Karsakov 43'; Mamchur (yellow card) 90'	Stadium: Metallurg Stadium; Referee: Nikolai Levnikov

9 August 1995 20	CSKA Moscow	4 – 0	Chernomorets Novorossiysk	Moscow
MSK (UTC+4)	Radimov 6'; Karsakov 32', 83'; Mashkarin 38'; Glushakov (yellow card) 48'	Report	Pavlov (yellow card) 37'	Stadium: Dynamo Stadium; Referee: Aleksandr Lapin

19 August 1995 21	Zhemchuzhina-Sochi	0 – 3	CSKA Moscow	Sochi
MSK (UTC+4)	Bondarev (yellow card) 19'; Kuznetsov (yellow card) 85'	Report	Mamchur (yellow card) 44'; Ulyanov 50'; Gerasimov 55'; Khokhlov 79'	Stadium: Sochi Central Stadium; Referee: Aleksandr Lapin

26 August 1995 22	CSKA Moscow	0 – 1	Lokomotiv Moscow	Moscow
MSK (UTC+4)	Ulyanov (penalty missed) 22'	Report	Kharlachyov 6'; Chugainov (yellow card) 73'; Maminov (yellow card) 75'	Stadium: Lokomotiv Stadium; Referee: A.Malyarov

30 August 1995 23	Rotor Volgograd	2 – 2	CSKA Moscow	Volgograd
MSK (UTC+4)	Niederhaus (yellow card) 51'; Veretennikov 86'; Nechayev 88'	Report	Gerasimov 32', 74'; Radimov (yellow card) 53'; Mashkarin (yellow card) 86'	Stadium: Central Stadium; Referee: Taras Bezubyak

9 September 1995 24	Tekstilshchik Kamyshin	1 – 2	CSKA Moscow	Kamyshin
MSK (UTC+4)	Polstyanov 77'; Natalushko (yellow card) 88'; Navochenko (yellow card) 90'	Report	Karsakov 57'; Gerasimov 82'	Stadium: Tekstilshchik Stadium; Referee: Lom-Ali Ibragimov

16 September 1995 25	CSKA Moscow	3 – 1	Dynamo-Gazovik Tyumen	Moscow
MSK (UTC+4)	Burdinskiy 7' (o.g.); Semak (yellow card) 25'; Plotnikov (yellow card) 26'; Lebed 60'; Ulyanov 78'	Report	Pryzetko 27' (pen.); Hrytsyna (yellow card) 41' (yellow-red card) 62'; Knyazhev (yellow card) 47'; Gerasimov (yellow card) 58'; Layushkin (yellow card) 79'	Stadium: Dynamo Stadium; Referee: Nikolai Levnikov

23 September 1995 26	KAMAZ	0 – 0	CSKA Moscow	Naberezhnye Chelny
18:00 MSK (UTC+4)		Report		Stadium: KAMAZ Stadium; Referee: Yuri Chebotaryov

30 September 1995 27	Rostselmash	1 – 3	CSKA Moscow	Rostov-on-Don
15:00 MSK (UTC+4)	Parovin (yellow card) 11'; Maslov (yellow card) 43'; Dyadyuk (yellow card) 52'; Loskov (penalty missed) 65'; Nechay (yellow card) 69'; Andreyev 89'	Report	Semak (yellow card) 6'; Gerasimov 9'; Mamchur 38' (pen.); Gradilenko (yellow card) 43'; Mashkarin 85'	Stadium: Olimp-2; Referee: Taras Bezubyak

14 October 1995 28	CSKA Moscow	1 – 2	Spartak Moscow	Moscow
MSK (UTC+4)	Shirshakov (yellow card) 22'; Radimov 62'	Report	Ananko (yellow card) 24'; Alenichev 27'; Shmarov 35'	Stadium: Dynamo Stadium; Referee: Sergei Anokhin

21 October 1995 29	CSKA Moscow	1 – 2	Alania Vladikavkaz	Moscow
MSK (UTC+4)	Radimov 83'	Report	Derkach 43' (yellow card) 87'; Tedeyev 56'	Stadium: Dynamo Stadium; Referee: Yuri Chebotaryov

26 October 1995 30	Torpedo Moscow	1 – 2	CSKA Moscow	Moscow
18:00 MSK (UTC+3)	Agashkov (penalty missed) 29'; Shustikov 61'	Report	Karsakov 16'; Semak 56'; Gradilenko (yellow card) 71'	Stadium: Eduard Streltsov Stadium; Referee: A.Kirillov

==== Table ====
Pos	Team	Pld	W	D	L	GF	GA	GD	Pts	Qualification or relegation
4	Dynamo Moscow	30	16	8	6	45	29	+16	56	Qualification to UEFA Cup qualifying round
5	Torpedo Moscow	30	16	7	7	40	30	+10	55	Qualification to UEFA Cup qualifying round
6	CSKA Moscow	30	16	5	9	56	34	+22	53	Qualification to UEFA Cup qualifying round
7	Rotor Volgograd	30	11	7	12	62	49	+13	40	Qualification to Intertoto Cup group stage
8	Uralmash Yekaterinburg	30	12	3	15	43	47	−4	39	Qualification to Intertoto Cup group stage

Source: rsssf.com
Rules for classification: 1) points; 2) goal difference; 3) number of goals scored.

=== Russian Cup ===
==== 1995-96 ====
4 October 1995 Round of 32	Baltika Kaliningrad	1 – 2 (a.e.t.)	CSKA Moscow	Kaliningrad
18:00 MSK (UTC+4)	Bulatov 25' (pen.); Shushlyakov (yellow card) 47'; Ajinjal (yellow card) 59'	Report	Shirshakov (yellow card) 53'; Bushmanov 65'; Mamchur (yellow card) 100'; Gradilenko 114'	Stadium: Kaliningrad Stadium; Referee: Aleksandr Lapin

4 November 1995 Round of 16	CSKA Moscow	3 – 0	Lokomotiv Nizhny Novgorod	Moscow
MSK (UTC+3)	Bushmanov (yellow card) 8'; Semak 18', 90' (yellow card) 32'; Radimov (yellow card) 69'; Karsakov 81'	Report	Kazakov (yellow card) 5'; Oskolkov (yellow card) 48' (red card) 69'	Stadium: Torpedo Stadium; Referee: Nikolai Levnikov

The Quarterfinal took place during the 1996 season.

== Squad statistics ==
As of match played 4 November 1995

=== Appearances and goals ===
No.	Pos	Nat	Player	Total		Top League		1995–96 Russian Cup	
No.	Pos	Nat	Player	Apps	Goals	Apps	Goals	Apps	Goals
	GK	(Russia) RUS	Yevgeni Plotnikov	21	0	19	0	2	0
	GK	(Russia) RUS	Andrei Novosadov	12	0	11+1	0	0	0
	DF	(Azerbaijan) AZE	Deni Gaisumov	10	2	6+4	2	0	0
	DF	(Russia) RUS	Yevgeni Bushmanov	31	2	29	1	2	1
	DF	(Russia) RUS	Valeri Glushakov	14	0	11+2	0	0+1	0
	DF	(Russia) RUS	Dmitri Gradilenko	21	1	16+4	0	1	1
	DF	(Russia) RUS	Aleksei Guschin	2	0	1+1	0	0	0
	DF	(Russia) RUS	Sergei Mamchur	27	2	25	2	2	0
	MF	(Russia) RUS	Denis Mashkarin	21	2	14+5	2	2	0
	DF	(Russia) RUS	Valeri Minko	24	0	24	0	0	0
	DF	(Russia) RUS	Dmitri Shirshakov	6	0	3+1	0	2	0
	MF	(Armenia) ARM	Tigran Petrosyants	9	0	2+7	0	0	0
	MF	(Belarus) BLR	Yuri Antonovich	21	0	13+8	0	0	0
	MF	(Russia) RUS	Dmitri Karsakov	30	10	19+9	10	1+1	0
	MF	(Russia) RUS	Dmitri Khokhlov	32	5	25+5	5	2	0
	MF	(Russia) RUS	Vladislav Radimov	29	5	27	5	2	0
	MF	(Russia) RUS	Sergei Semak	23	6	22	4	1	2
	MF	(Russia) RUS	Dmitri Shoukov	10	0	6+3	0	1	0
	MF	(Russia) RUS	Dmitry Ulyanov	22	4	17+4	4	1	0
	FW	(Russia) RUS	Aleksei Gerasimov	19	6	12+5	6	2	0
	FW	(Russia) RUS	Vladimir Lebed	17	7	11+4	7	1+1	0
Players who left CSKA Moscow during the season:
	FW	(Russia) RUS	Ilshat Faizulin	16	6	16	6	0	0
	FW	(Russia) RUS	Roman Oreshchuk	2	0	0+2	0	0	0

=== Goal Scorers ===
Place	Position	Nation	Name	Top League	1995–96 Russian Cup	Total
1	MF	(Russia)	Dmitri Karsakov	10	1	11
2	FW	(Russia)	Vladimir Lebed	7	0	7
3	FW	(Russia)	Aleksei Gerasimov	6	0	6
3	FW	(Russia)	Ilshat Faizulin	6	0	6
3	MF	(Russia)	Sergei Semak	4	2	6
6	MF	(Russia)	Vladislav Radimov	5	0	5
6	MF	(Russia)	Dmitri Khokhlov	5	0	5
8	MF	(Russia)	Dmitry Ulyanov	4	0	4
9	DF	(Azerbaijan)	Deni Gaisumov	2	0	2
9	DF	(Russia)	Sergei Mamchur	2	0	2
9	MF	(Russia)	Denis Mashkarin	2	0	2
9	DF	(Russia)	Yevgeni Bushmanov	1	1	2
13	DF	(Russia)	Dmitri Gradilenko	0	1	1
13			Own goal	1	0	1
13			Unknown	1	0	1
			TOTALS	56	5	61

=== Disciplinary record ===
Nation	Position	Name	Top League		1995–96 Russian Cup		Total	
Nation	Position	Name	Booked	Sent off (straight red)	Booked	Sent off (straight red)	Booked	Sent off (straight red)
(Russia)	GK	Andrei Novosadov	1	0	0	0	1	0
(Russia)	GK	Yevgeni Plotnikov	1	0	0	0	1	0
(Azerbaijan)	DF	Deni Gaisumov	2	0	0	0	2	0
(Russia)	DF	Yevgeni Bushmanov	4	0	1	0	5	0
(Russia)	DF	Dmitri Gradilenko	6	0	0	0	6	0
(Russia)	DF	Sergei Mamchur	4	0	1	0	5	0
(Russia)	DF	Dmitri Shirshakov	1	0	1	0	2	0
(Belarus)	MF	Yuri Antonovich	1	0	0	0	1	0
(Russia)	MF	Valeri Glushakov	1	0	0	0	1	0
(Russia)	MF	Dmitri Khokhlov	1	0	0	0	1	0
(Russia)	MF	Denis Mashkarin	3	0	0	0	3	0
(Russia)	MF	Vladislav Radimov	7	0	1	0	8	0
(Russia)	MF	Sergei Semak	3	0	1	0	4	0
		TOTALS	35	0	5	0	40	0
