= Kulichenko =

Kulichenko (Russian: Куличенко, Ukrainian: Куліченко) or Kulychenko (Ukrainian: Куличенко), is a Russian and Ukrainian surname. Notable people with the surname include:

- Ivan Kulichenko (born 1955), Ukrainian politician
- Sergei Kulichenko (born 1978), Russian footballer
- Elena Kulichenko (born 2002), Russian-born Cypriot athlete
