= Glushakov =

Glushakov (Russian: Глушако́в) is a Russian surname that may refer to:

- Denis Glushakov (born 1987), Russian footballer
- Valeri Glushakov (born 1959), Soviet and Russian footballer
