= Abdrazakov =

Abdrazakov (Russian: Абдразаков) is a Russian masculine surname, its feminine counterpart is Abdrazakova. It may refer to

- Elmira Abdrazakova (born 1994), Kazakhstani-Russian model
- Igor Abdrazakov (born 1978), Russian football player
- Ildar Abdrazakov (born 1976), Russian opera singer
