= Stanislav Bondarev =

Russian footballer

Stanislav Bondar Станислав Владимирович Бондарев
Personal information
- Full name: Stanislav Vladimirovich Bondar
- Date of birth: 28 June 1968 (age 58)
- Place of birth: Tashkent, Uzbek SSR
- Height: 1.64 m (5 ft 4 1/2 in)
- Position: Defender

Youth career
- DYuSSh-6 Tambov

Senior career*
Years	Team	Apps	(Gls)
1985–1991	FC SKA Rostov-on-Don	166	(25)
1991	FC Shakhtar Donetsk	0	(0)
1992–1993	FC Zhemchuzhina Sochi	42	(8)
1993	→ FC Torpedo Adler	1	(1)
1993–1994	Beitar Tel Aviv		
1994–2000	FC Zhemchuzhina Sochi	146	(7)
2001	FC Kuzbass-Dynamo Kemerovo	27	(1)
- * Club domestic league appearances and goals

Stanislav Vladimirovich Bondarev (Russian: Станислав Владимирович Бондарев; born 28 June 1968) is a former Russian professional footballer.

== Club career ==
He made his professional debut in the Soviet Top League in 1985 for FC SKA Rostov-on-Don. In his 7 seasons with SKA he suffered 3 relegations and, as a result, played on every professional level of the Soviet football pyramid, his last season with the club was in the fourth-tier Soviet Second League B.

In 1991 with FC Shakhtar Donetsk, he did not appear in the Soviet Top League, but made two appearances in the Soviet Cup.
