= Pyotr Sedunov =

Russian footballer

Personal information
- Full name: Pyotr Valeryevich Sedunov
- Date of birth: 28 September 1977 (age 49)
- Height: 1.84 m (6 ft 0 in)
- Position: Defender

Senior career*
Years	Team	Apps	(Gls)
1994	FC Chernomorets Novorossiysk	0	(0)
1995–1996	IFK Luleå	24	(2)
1997	PFC CSKA Moscow	3	(0)
1998	FC Gazovik-Gazprom Izhevsk	13	(0)
1998	FC Irtysh Omsk	14	(2)
1999	FC Metallurg Lipetsk	13	(1)
2000–2004	Bodens BK	83	(22)
2005–2006	Östers IF	13	(0)
2006–2012	Bodens BK	59	(10)
- * Club domestic league appearances and goals

Pyotr Valeryevich Sedunov (Russian: Пётр Валерьевич Седунов; born 28 September 1977) is a Russian former professional footballer.
