= Aleksandr Ovsyannikov =

Russian footballer

Personal information
- Full name: Aleksandr Vladimirovich Ovsyannikov
- Date of birth: 8 August 1974 (age 52)
- Place of birth: Voronezh, Russian SFSR
- Height: 1.78 m (5 ft 10 in)
- Position: Forward

Youth career
- PFC CSKA Moscow

Senior career*
Years	Team	Apps	(Gls)
1993–1994	FC Iskra Smolensk	40	(6)
1995–1997	FC Fakel Voronezh	49	(11)
1998	FC Baltika Kaliningrad	4	(0)
1998	FC Metallurg Lipetsk	19	(1)
1999–2000	FC Fakel Voronezh	11	(6)
2000	FC Rubin Kazan	2	(1)
2001	FC Gazovik Ostrogozhsk		
2002	FC Fakel-Voronezh Voronezh	1	(0)
2002	FC Salyut-Energiya Belgorod	12	(1)
2003	FC Ural Yekaterinburg	6	(0)

Managerial career
- 2005: FC Fakel Voronezh (administrator)
- 2008: FC Dynamo Voronezh (administrator)
- * Club domestic league appearances and goals

Aleksandr Vladimirovich Ovsyannikov (Russian: Александр Владимирович Овсянников; born 8 August 1974) is a former Russian professional footballer.

== Club career ==
He made his professional debut in the Russian Second Division in 1993 for FC Iskra Smolensk. He played 1 game in the UEFA Intertoto Cup 1998 for FC Baltika Kaliningrad.
