= Leonidas (footballer, born 1975) =

Brazilian footballer

Personal information
- Full name: Leonidas Ferreira de Paulo Junior
- Date of birth: 23 February 1975 (age 51)
- Place of birth: Goiânia, Brazil
- Height: 1.85 m (6 ft 1 in)
- Position: Winger

Senior career*
Years	Team	Apps	(Gls)
1993	Corinthians Alagoano		
1994	Grêmio	11	(1)
1995	Corinthians	8	(0)
1996	CSKA Moscow	9	(6)
1996	Atlético Paranaense		
1997	Torpedo Moscow	3	(1)
1997	Corinthians Alagoano	0	(0)
1997	Benfica	4	(0)
1998	FC Arsenal Tula	6	(0)
2000–2001	Levski Sofia	0	(0)
2003	Novo Hamburgo	0	(0)
2004	Novo Horizonte	0	(0)
Total		41	(8)
- * Club domestic league appearances and goals

Leonidas Ferreira de Paulo Junior (born 23 February 1975), simply known as Leonidas or Leonidas Ferreira, is a retired Brazilian footballer who played as a winger.

== Career ==
Born in Goiânia, Leonidas started at Corinthians Alagoano in the 1993 Campeonato Alagoano, moving to Grêmio a year later. He then passed through Corinthians, before moving to Russia in 1996 to play for PFC CSKA Moscow.

Leonidas was the first Brazilian to represent CSKA. He made his debut for them on 3 August 1996, scoring direct from a free kick in their 1-1 draw with Uralmash Yekaterinburg. He played alongside his compatriot Leandro Samarone, scoring six times in nine league appearances, and also playing four games in the 1996–97 UEFA Cup, in a season plagued by minor injuries. After a brief spell at Atlético Paranaense, Aleksandr Tarkhanov brought him to Torpedo Moscow in 1997, where he scored once in three games but sustained a severe injury afterwards, ending his season. Translator Andrew Tarasov later commented on Leonidas in an interview in 2011: "Leonidas was capricious person – the first foreigner he had. So he just came thinking he would be a king here, that Russians could not play football, only he could. But when he saw with his own eyes that in Russia there are other good players and he was just one in many, the discovery upset him and discouraged him. Any hard contact – and he began to squeal and squeak. Plus life was very difficult for him, in part, of course, because 1996 Moscow was not what is today. There were few supermarkets, which he loved. Therefore, Leonidas seem to think that all in Russia was bad. And if a person is impossible to work on in football, it naturally transfers to everyday life."

Released by Torpedo, he returned to Brazil and to Corinthians Alogoano, staying just a few months, before signing with Benfica in July 1997. He made his debut on 13 September in a home draw against Académica, replacing Jorge Soares at half-time. Failing to make an impression, he played his last game on 21 December, already with Graeme Souness in charge, and left in the transfer market to join FC Arsenal Tula.

His second spell in Russia was short lived; he played just six games in the 1998 Russian Top Division. In 2000–01, he joined Levski Sofia, playing three European games in the 2000–01 UEFA Champions League qualifying rounds, twice against F91 Dudelange and once against Beşiktaş. His last known club was representing Novo Hamburgo in 2003. He also played a game for Novo Horizonte in a 2004 Copa do Brasil match.
