= Oleh Pestryakov =

Ukrainian footballer and coach

Personal information
- Full name: Oleh Ihorovych Pestryakov
- Date of birth: 5 August 1974 (age 52)
- Place of birth: Yevpatoria, Ukrainian SSR
- Height: 1.78 m (5 ft 10 in)
- Position: Midfielder

Youth career
- DYuSSh Yevpatoria

Senior career*
Years	Team	Apps	(Gls)
1992–1994	FC Yavir Krasnopilya	76	(19)
1995–1996	CSKA Kyiv	48	(12)
1996	PFC CSKA Moscow	2	(0)
1997–1999	FC Rostselmash Rostov-on-Don	79	(14)
1997–1999	→ FC Rostselmash-2 Rostov-on-Don	13	(3)
1999–2002	FC Shakhtar Donetsk	21	(2)
1999–2002	→ FC Shakhtar-2 Donetsk	20	(4)
2003	FC Spartak Moscow	3	(0)
2003	FC Metalurh Zaporizhya	7	(1)
2004	SC Tavriya Simferopol	10	(1)
2004–2005	FC Arsenal Kyiv	6	(0)
2005–2006	SC Tavriya Simferopol	8	(0)

Managerial career
- 2007–2014: FC Shakhtar Donetsk (academy)
- * Club domestic league appearances and goals

Oleh Ihorovych Pestryakov (Ukrainian: Олег Ігорович Пестряков; Russian: Олег Игоревич Пестряков; born 5 August 1974) is a Ukrainian professional football coach and a former player.

== Club career ==
He made his professional debut in the Ukrainian Second League in 1992 for FC Yavir Krasnopilya.

== Honours ==
- Ukrainian Premier League champion: 2002.
- Ukrainian Premier League runner-up: 2000, 2001, 2003.

== European club competitions ==
- UEFA Intertoto Cup 1999 with FC Rostselmash Rostov-on-Don: 4 games.
- 2002–03 UEFA Champions League qualification with FC Shakhtar Donetsk: 1 game.
