= Gennadi Parovin =

Russian footballer

Personal information
- Full name: Gennadi Veniaminovich Parovin
- Date of birth: 18 January 1965 (age 61)
- Height: 1.81 m (5 ft 11 1/2 in)
- Position: Defender

Youth career
- SDYuSShOR-7 Rostov-on-Don
- ROShISP-10 Rostov-on-Don

Senior career*
Years	Team	Apps	(Gls)
1982–1984	FC Rostselmash Rostov-on-Don	62	(2)
1985	FC SKA Rostov-on-Don	14	(0)
1986–1990	FC Rostselmash Rostov-on-Don	155	(3)
1991	FC APK Azov	3	(0)
1992	FC Rostselmash Rostov-on-Don	0	(0)
1992	→ FC Rostselmash-2 Rostov-on-Don	4	(0)
1992–1993	Bajai LSE	18	(0)
1993–1996	FC Rostselmash Rostov-on-Don	91	(0)
1997	FC Zhemchuzhina Sochi	0	(0)
1998	FC Kuban Krasnodar	3	(0)
- * Club domestic league appearances and goals

Gennadi Veniaminovich Parovin (Russian: Геннадий Вениаминович Паровин; born 18 January 1965) is a former Russian professional footballer.

== Club career ==
He made his professional debut in the Soviet Second League in 1982 for FC Rostselmash Rostov-on-Don.
