= Dmytro Yakovenko (footballer) =

Ukrainian footballer (born 1971)

Personal information
- Full name: Dmytro Oleksandrovych Yakovenko
- Date of birth: 6 May 1971 (age 55)
- Place of birth: Karatau, Kazakh SSR
- Height: 1.78 m (5 ft 10 in)
- Position: Defender

Youth career
- Kazakh Republican Sportinternat Alma-Ata

Senior career*
Years	Team	Apps	(Gls)
1989	RShVSM Alma-Ata	7	(0)
1989–1991	Khimik Dzhambul	79	(3)
1992	Krystal Chortkiv	9	(0)
1992–1996	Dnipro Dnipropetrovsk	79	(2)
1996–1997	Kryvbas Kryvyi Rih	13	(0)
1997	CSKA Moscow	3	(0)
1997	→ CSKA-d Moscow (loan)	16	(0)
1997	Saturn Ramenskoye	9	(0)
1998	KAMAZ-Chally Naberezhnye Chelny	29	(0)
1999	Spartak Kostroma	32	(2)
2000	Zhemchuzhina Sochi	27	(1)
2001	Atyrau	3	(0)
2002–2003	Sokil Zolochiv	2	(0)
2003	FC Taraz	13	(0)
2004–2005	Polissya Zhytomyr	1	(0)
2005	FC Yevropa Pryluky	5	(0)
2007	FC Lokomotiv-Veteran Dnipropetrovsk		
2007	FC StekloPlast Dnipropetrovsk		
2007–2008	FC Alan Dnipropetrovsk		
2008	FC StekloPlast Dnipropetrovsk		

International career
1993	Ukraine	1	(0)
- * Club domestic league appearances and goals

Dmytro Oleksandrovych Yakovenko (Ukrainian: Дмитро Олександрович Яковенко; born 6 May 1971) is a Ukrainian former professional footballer who played as a defender. He represented the Ukraine national team in a friendly against Lithuania on 18 May 1993.

== Honours ==
Dnipro Dnipropetrovsk

- Ukrainian Premier League runner-up: 1993
