= Yuri Matveyev =

Russian footballer

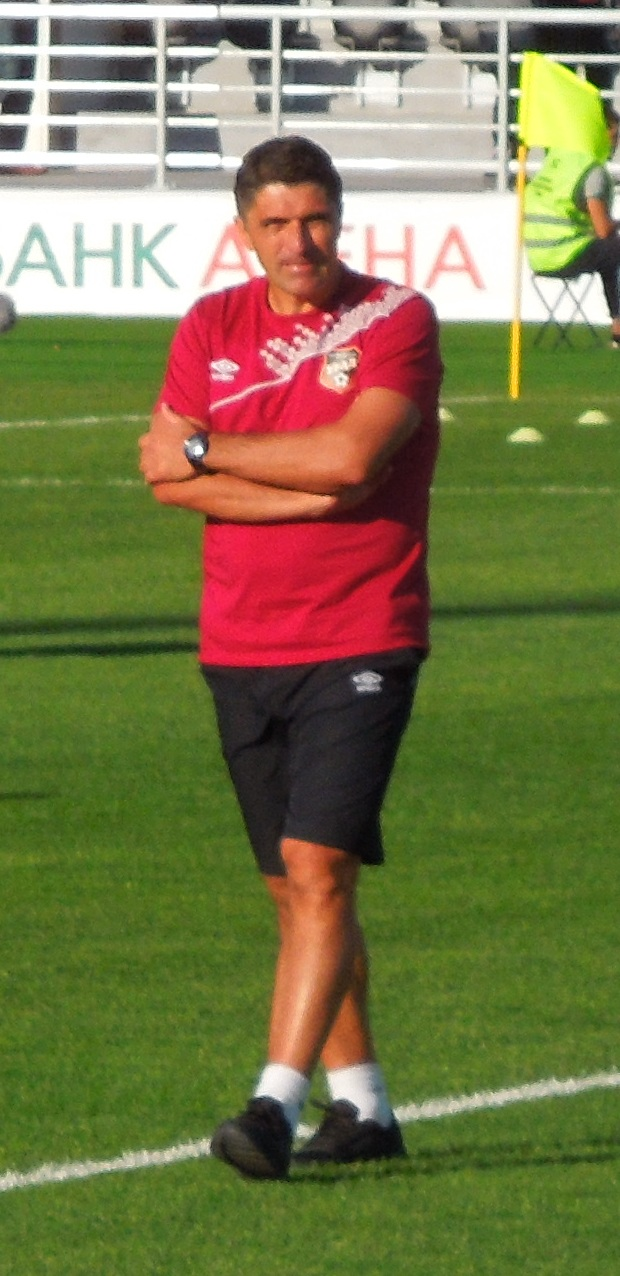
- Matveev in 2015

Personal information
- Full name: Yuri Aleksandrovich Matveyev
- Date of birth: 8 June 1967 (age 59)
- Place of birth: Nizhny Tagil, Russian SFSR
- Height: 1.83 m (6 ft 0 in)
- Position: Striker

Team information
- Current team: FC Ural-2 Yekaterinburg (manager)

Senior career*
Years	Team	Apps	(Gls)
1984–1987	FC Uralets Nizhny Tagil	97	(25)
1988–1989	FC Uralmash Yekaterinburg	71	(27)
1990	FC Zenit Leningrad	7	(0)
1990	FC Uralmash Yekaterinburg	32	(6)
1991	FC Torpedo Moscow	12	(1)
1992–1993	FC Uralmash Yekaterinburg	39	(24)
1993–1994	Ankaragücü	15	(1)
1994–1995	FC Uralmash Yekaterinburg	34	(18)
1996	PFC CSKA Moscow	15	(2)
1996–1997	Suwon Samsung Bluewings	19	(2)
1998–2000	FC Rostselmash Rostov-on-Don	65	(17)
2000	FC Lokomotiv Nizhny Novgorod	13	(1)

International career
1992–1993	Russia	4	(0)

Managerial career
- 2009–2011: FC Ural Yekaterinburg (assistant)
- 2010: FC Ural Yekaterinburg (caretaker)
- 2011: FC Ural Yekaterinburg
- 2012–2018: FC Ural Yekaterinburg (coach)
- 2015: FC Ural Yekaterinburg (caretaker)
- 2016: FC Ural Yekaterinburg (caretaker)
- 2018–2020: FC Ural-2 Yekaterinburg
- 2020–2021: FC Ural Yekaterinburg
- 2024–2025: FC Uralets-TS Nizhny Tagil
- 2026–: FC Ural-2 Yekaterinburg
- * Club domestic league appearances and goals

Yuri Aleksandrovich Matveyev (Russian: Юрий Александрович Матвеев; born 8 June 1967) is a Russian football coach and former player who is the manager of FC Ural-2 Yekaterinburg.

== International career ==
Matveyev made his debut for Russia in a friendly against Mexico on 16 August 1992. This match marked the first time Russia competed under its own name following the dissolution of the USSR.

== Honours ==
- Soviet Premier League bronze: 1991.
- Soviet Cup runner-up: 1991.
- Top 33 players year-end list: 1992, 1998.
- Top scorer in Russian Premier League: 1992 (20 goals in 28 games).

== Coaching career ==
Following several stints as a caretaker manager for FC Ural Yekaterinburg, he was hired as a permanent manager on 28 July 2020. On 10 August 2021, he left Ural by mutual consent.
