= Vitali Tasenko =

Russian footballer (1975–2025)

Personal information
- Full name: Vitali Petrovich Tasenko
- Date of birth: 30 January 1975
- Place of birth: Rostov-on-Don, Russian SFSR, USSR
- Date of death: 9 April 2025 (aged 50)
- Height: 1.88 m (6 ft 2 in)
- Position: Defender

Youth career
- SKA Rostov-on-Don

Senior career*
Years	Team	Apps	(Gls)
1993–1994	Istochnik Rostov-on-Don	35	(3)
1995–1997	SKA Rostov-on-Don	84	(10)
1997	CSKA Moscow	4	(0)
1997	→ CSKA-d Moscow (loan)	12	(0)
1998	Kuban Krasnodar	28	(3)
1999	Volgar-Gazprom Astrakhan	0	(0)
1999	Nemkom Krasnodar (amateur)		
2000	Tsentr-R-Kavkaz Krasnodar (amateur)		
2000	FC Urozhay Chertkovo		
2000	FC Don-Azov Azov		
2001	SKA Rostov-on-Don	34	(9)
2002	FC Mayak Rostov-on-Don		
2002	FC Tikhoretsk		
2003	SKA Rostov-on-Don	29	(1)
2004	Amur Blagoveshchensk	7	(0)
- * Club domestic league appearances and goals

Vitali Petrovich Tasenko (Russian: Виталий Петрович Тасенко; 30 January 1975 – 9 April 2025) was a Russian footballer who played as a defender. He died on 9 April 2025, at the age of 50.
