= Aleksandr Beskrovny =

Russian footballer and coach

Personal information
- Full name: Aleksandr Vladimirovich Beskrovny
- Date of birth: 29 January 1971 (age 55)
- Place of birth: Ordzhonikidze, Russian SFSR
- Height: 1.80 m (5 ft 11 in)
- Positions: Defender; midfielder

Senior career*
Years	Team	Apps	(Gls)
1989	FC Spartak Vladikavkaz	2	(0)
1989–1992	FC Volgar Astrakhan	128	(7)
1993–2001	FC Fakel Voronezh	301	(7)
2002	FC Chernomorets Novorossiysk	30	(0)
2003	FC Salyut-Energiya Belgorod	26	(0)
2004	FC Volgar-Gazprom Astrakhan	16	(0)
2005–2006	FC Lokomotiv Liski	55	(0)

Managerial career
- 2008: FC Zodiak Stary Oskol (administrator)
- 2010: FC Fakel Voronezh (director)
- 2012–2013: FC Metallurg-Oskol Stary Oskol
- 2014: FC Vybor-Kurbatovo Voronezh (assistant)
- * Club domestic league appearances and goals

Aleksandr Vladimirovich Beskrovny (Russian: Александр Владимирович Бескровный; born 29 January 1971) is a Russian professional football coach and a former player who last worked as an assistant manager with FC Vybor-Kurbatovo Voronezh. He made his professional debut in the Soviet First League in 1989 for FC Spartak Vladikavkaz.
