= Nugzar Lobzhanidze =

Soviet and Georgian footballer

Personal information
- Date of birth: 7 September 1971 (age 55)
- Height: 1.85 m (6 ft 1 in)
- Position: Defender

Senior career*
| Years | Team | Apps | (Gls) |
| 1988–1993 | Gorda Rustavi | 92 | (0) |
| 1993–1996 | FC Dinamo Tbilisi | 80 | (1) |
| 1997 | PFC CSKA Moscow | 10 | (0) |
| 1997–1998 | FC Dinamo Tbilisi | 17 | (0) |
| 1998–1999 | Skoda Xanthi | 1 | (0) |

International career
| 1993–1997 | Georgia | 13 | (0) |
- * Club domestic league appearances and goals

Nugzar Lobzhanidze (Georgian: ნუგზარ ლობჟანიძე; born 7 September 1971) is a Georgian former professional footballer.
