= Oleh Kyrylov =

Ukrainian footballer

Personal information
- Full name: Oleh Mykolayovych Kyrylov
- Date of birth: 7 September 1975 (age 51)
- Place of birth: Simferopol, Ukrainian SSR
- Height: 1.73 m (5 ft 8 in)
- Position: Defender

Youth career
- FC Metalist Kharkiv

Senior career*
Years	Team	Apps	(Gls)
1992	FC Olympik Kharkiv	8	(0)
1992	FC Presnya Moscow	13	(0)
1993–1994	FC Asmaral Moscow	1	(0)
1993–1994	→ FC Asmaral-d Moscow (loans)	57	(1)
1995–1996	FC Metalist Kharkiv	50	(1)
1996	FC Neftekhimik Nizhnekamsk	1	(0)
1996–1997	FC Enerhetyk Komsomolske	8	(0)
1997–1998	FC Zarya Leninsk-Kuznetsky	41	(1)
1999–2000	FC Nosta Novotroitsk	27	(0)
2002–2003	FC Arsenal Kharkiv	11	(1)
2003	FC Hazovyk-KhGV Kharkiv	3	(0)
2003–2004	FC Helios Kharkiv	11	(1)
2006	FC Lokomotyv Dvorichna	2	(0)
- * Club domestic league appearances and goals

Oleh Mykolayovych Kyrylov (Ukrainian: Олег Миколайович Кирилов; born 7 September 1975) is a former Ukrainian football player.
