= Mikhail Savchenko =

Russian-Ukrainian footballer and coach

Personal information
- Full name: Mikhail Pavlovich Savchenko
- Date of birth: 19 June 1980 (age 46)
- Place of birth: Torez, Ukrainian SSR, Soviet Union
- Height: 1.88 m (6 ft 2 in)
- Position: Goalkeeper

Team information
- Current team: FC Krasnodar (GK coach)

Senior career*
Years	Team	Apps	(Gls)
1997–1998	Hirnyk Torez	2	(0)
1999–2000	Metalurg Komsomolske	6	(0)
2000–2002	Tytan Armyansk	9	(0)
2002	FC Mozdok	21	(0)
2002–2003	FC Torez	1	(0)
2003–2005	FC Rostov	1	(0)
2006	Volga Nizhny Novgorod	8	(0)
2006	Torpedo-Volga Pavlovo		
2007	Volga Tver	9	(0)
2012–2013	FC Tselina		

Managerial career
- 2017–2022: FC Krasnodar-2 (assistant)
- 2022–: FC Krasnodar (GK coach)
- * Club domestic league appearances and goals

Mikhail Pavlovich Savchenko (Russian: Михаил Павлович Савченко; Ukrainian: Михайло Павлович Савченко; born 19 June 1980) is a Ukrainian-Russian football coach and former player.

He currently works as goalkeeping coach at FC Krasnodar.
