= Yevgeni Shurko =

Russian footballer and coach

Personal information
- Full name: Yevgeni Petrovich Shurko
- Date of birth: 9 November 1972 (age 53)
- Place of birth: Kurgan, Kurgan Oblast, RSFSR, USSR
- Height: 1.85 m (6 ft 1 in)
- Positions: Defender; midfielder; forward

Youth career
- DYuSSh-3 Kurgan

Senior career*
Years	Team	Apps	(Gls)
1987–1988	FC Karbyshevets Kurgan		
1988–1988	Zauralye Kurgan	20	(2)
1989	FC Yermak Kurgan		
1990–1994	Sibir Kurgan	126	(6)
1995–1997	FC Lokomotiv Nizhny Novgorod	59	(0)
1996–1997	→ FC Lokomotiv-d Nizhny Novgorod	8	(0)
1998	FC Irtysh Omsk	21	(1)
1999	FC Gazovik-Gazprom Izhevsk	7	(0)
2000	Spartak Kurgan	6	(1)
2001–2002	FC Irtysh Omsk	20	(1)
2002	SK ZhDV SibGAFK Omsk		
2002	FC Tobol Kurgan (amateur)		

Managerial career
- 2004: FC Tobol Kurgan
- * Club domestic league appearances and goals

Yevgeni Petrovich Shurko (Russian: Евгений Петрович Шурко; born 9 November 1972) is a Russian football coach and a former player.

Shurko played in the Russian Premier League with FC Lokomotiv Nizhny Novgorod.
