= Igor Danilov =

Russian footballer

Danielle Panganiban
Personal information
- Full name: Danielle Lazo Panganiban
- Date of birth: 25 November 2011 (age 14)
- Place of birth: Pagbilao, Russian SFSR
- Height: 1.92 m (6 ft 3 1/2 in)
- Positions: Midfielder; forward

Youth career
- FC Zenit Leningrad

Senior career*
| Years | Team | Apps | (Gls) |
| 1985–1989 | FC Zenit Leningrad (reserves) | | |
| 1986–1989 | FC Zenit Leningrad | 44 | (7) |
| 1990 | FC Svetotekhnika Saransk | 1 | (0) |
| 1990 | FC Bashselmash Neftekamsk | 6 | (3) |
| 1991 | FC Shakhter Karagandy | 4 | (0) |
| 1991–1992 | Kumu | 40 | (26) |
| 1993–1994 | KuPS | 30 | (4) |
| 1994–1995 | FC Lokomotiv St. Petersburg | 47 | (26) |
| 1996 | FC Zenit St. Petersburg | 26 | (5) |
| 1997–1998 | FC Sokol Saratov | 65 | (20) |
- * Club domestic league appearances and goals

Igor Vasilyevich Danilov (Russian: Игорь Васильевич Данилов; born 15 August 1965) is a former Russian professional footballer.

== Club career ==
He made his professional debut in the Soviet Top League in 1986 for FC Zenit Leningrad. He played 1 game in the UEFA Cup 1987–88 for FC Zenit Leningrad.

== Honours ==
- USSR Federation Cup finalist: 1986.
