= Yevgeny Ageyev =

Russian footballer (born 1976)

Yevgeni Ageyev
Personal information
- Full name: Yevgeni Anatolyevich Ageyev
- Date of birth: 25 September 1976 (age 50)
- Place of birth: Pavlodar, Kazakh SSR
- Height: 1.82 m (5 ft 11 1/2 in)
- Position: Defender

Senior career*
Years	Team	Apps	(Gls)
1992–1995	PFC CSKA-d Moscow	76	(8)
1996	FC Rostselmash Rostov-on-Don	32	(0)
1997	PFC CSKA Moscow	22	(0)
1998	PFC CSKA-2 Moscow	7	(1)
1998	FC Arsenal Tula	22	(0)
1999	FC Torpedo-ZIL Moscow	15	(0)
2000	FC Zhemchuzhina Sochi	26	(2)
2001	FC Nika Moscow	14	(1)
2001	FC Lokomotiv Nizhny Novgorod	11	(1)
2003	FC Lukoil Chelyabinsk	11	(0)
2004	FC Dynamo Kirov	30	(1)
2005	FC Lokomotiv-NN Nizhny Novgorod	14	(0)

International career
1994	Russia U-19	2	(0)
1995–1997	Russia U-21	4	(0)
- * Club domestic league appearances and goals

Yevgeni Anatolyevich Ageyev (Russian: Евгений Анатольевич Агеев; born 25 September 1976) is a Russian retired professional footballer.

He made his professional debut in the Russian Second Division in 1992 for PFC CSKA-d Moscow.
