= Albert Doguzov =

Russian footballer and coach

Personal information
- Full name: Albert Askharovich Doguzov
- Date of birth: 12 March 1968 (age 58)
- Place of birth: Tskhinvali, Georgian SSR
- Height: 1.66 m (5 ft 5 in)
- Position: Midfielder

Senior career*
Years	Team	Apps	(Gls)
1986–1990	FC Liakhvi Tskhinvali		
1990–1991	FC Spartak Vladikavkaz	9	(0)
1991–1993	FC Spartak Anapa	56	(3)
1993–2000	FC Chernomorets Novorossiysk	228	(37)
2001	FC Alania Vladikavkaz	24	(1)
2002	FC Fakel Voronezh	27	(2)
2003–2004	FC Alania Vladikavkaz	13	(0)
2004–2006	FC Chernomorets Novorossiysk	72	(5)

Managerial career
- 2005: FC Chernomorets Novorossiysk (assistant)
- 2007–2008: FC Chernomorets Novorossiysk (assistant)
- 2008–2012: FC Chernomorets-d Novorossiysk
- 2012–2013: FC Chernomorets Novorossiysk (assistant)
- * Club domestic league appearances and goals

Albert Askharovich Doguzov (Russian: Альберт Асхарович Догузов; born 12 March 1968) is a Russian professional football coach and a former player.

== Club career ==
He made his professional debut in the Umaglesi Liga in 1990 for FC Liakhvi Tskhinvali.
