= Dmitri Shirshakov =

Russian footballer

Personal information
- Full name: Dmitri Aleksandrovich Shirshakov
- Date of birth: 14 November 1973 (age 52)
- Place of birth: Moscow, Russian SFSR
- Height: 1.78 m (5 ft 10 in)
- Position: Defender

Youth career
- PFC CSKA Moscow

Senior career*
Years	Team	Apps	(Gls)
1991–1995	PFC CSKA Moscow	5	(0)
1992–1995	→ PFC CSKA-d Moscow (loans)	94	(6)
1995	→ FC Dynamo-Gazovik Tyumen (loan)	12	(0)
1996–2000	FC Saturn Ramenskoye	118	(5)
2000	→ FC Saturn-d Ramenskoye (loan)	8	(0)
2000	FC Shinnik Yaroslavl	9	(1)
2001	FC Sokol Saratov	8	(0)
2001–2002	FC Shatura		
2002	FC Atyrau	0	(0)
2003	FC Salyut-Energia Belgorod	35	(2)
2004	FC Luch-Energiya Vladivostok	13	(0)
2005	FC Titan Moscow	1	(0)
2006	FC Zvezda Serpukhov	16	(1)
- * Club domestic league appearances and goals

Dmitri Shirshakov (Russian: Дмитрий Александрович Ширшаков; born 14 November 1973 in Moscow) is a former Russian football player.
