= Igor Abdrazakov =

Russian footballer (born 1978)

Personal information
- Full name: Igor Yuryevich Abdrazakov
- Date of birth: 7 August 1978 (age 48)
- Place of birth: Novorossiysk, Russian SFSR
- Height: 1.74 m (5 ft 9 in)
- Position: Forward

Youth career
- FC Chernomorets Novorossiysk

Senior career*
Years	Team	Apps	(Gls)
1995–1997	FC Chernomorets Novorossiysk	13	(0)
1998	FC Anapa	8	(6)
1998	PFC CSKA Moscow	0	(0)
1999	FC Rubin Kazan	14	(0)
2000	FC Spartak Anapa (amateur)		
2002	FC Urengoygazprom Anapa		
- * Club domestic league appearances and goals

Igor Yuryevich Abdrazakov (Russian: Игорь Юрьевич Абдразаков; born 7 August 1978) is a former Russian football player.

== Club career ==
He made his Russian Premier League debut for FC Chernomorets Novorossiysk on 5 August 1995 in a game against FC Torpedo Moscow.
