= Vladislav Matviyenko =

Russian footballer and coach

Personal information
- Full name: Vladislav Ivanovich Matviyenko
- Date of birth: 27 September 1967 (age 59)
- Place of birth: Stavropol, Russian SFSR
- Height: 1.82 m (5 ft 11 1/2 in)
- Position: Midfielder

Youth career
- FC Lokomotiv Mineralnye Vody

Senior career*
Years	Team	Apps	(Gls)
1989	FC Okean Nakhodka	25	(1)
1990–1991	FC Dynamo Stavropol	18	(0)
1991–1992	FC Lokomotiv Moscow	8	(0)
1992–1994	FC Dynamo Stavropol	84	(6)
1995	FC Krylia Sovetov Samara	25	(2)
1996	FC Energiya-Tekstilshchik Kamyshin	29	(3)
1997	FC Zhemchuzhina Sochi	27	(2)
1998	FC Vityaz Mikhailovsk		
1999	FC Fakel Voronezh	30	(0)
2000	FC Spartak-Kavkaztransgaz Izobilny	26	(3)
2001	FC Okean Nakhodka	26	(2)
2003	FC Zhemchuzhina Budyonnovsk	30	(1)
2005–2007	FC Okean Nakhodka	67	(0)

Managerial career
- 2008–2009: FC Okean Nakhodka (administrator)
- 2010: FC Okean Nakhodka (assistant)
- 2011–2012: FC Okean Nakhodka
- 2014: FC Nogliki
- * Club domestic league appearances and goals

Vladislav Ivanovich Matviyenko (Russian: Владислав Иванович Матвиенко; born 27 September 1967) is a Russian professional football coach and a former player. As a player, he made his professional debut in the Soviet Second League in 1989 for FC Okean Nakhodka.
