= Leandro Samarone =

Brazilian footballer and manager

Personal information
- Full name: Leandro Samarone da Rosa Fernandes
- Date of birth: 26 June 1971 (age 55)
- Place of birth: Ribeira, SP, Brazil
- Height: 1.78 m (5 ft 10 in)
- Position: Defender

Youth career
- XV de Piracicaba

Senior career*
Years	Team	Apps	(Gls)
–1992	XV de Piracicaba		
1993	Ponte Preta		
1994	Bragantino		
1995	Grêmio		
1996	Ituano		
1996	CSKA Moscow	13	(2)
1997	Vila Nova		
1997–1998	Torpedo Moscow	25	(1)
1998	Spartak Moscow	10	(0)
1999–2000	Arsenal Tula	50	(4)
2000–2002	Krylia Sovetov Samara	47	(2)
2002–2003	Rubin Kazan	19	(2)
2003	Terek Grozny	18	(1)

Managerial career
- 2005: União Barbarense
- * Club domestic league appearances and goals

Leandro Samarone da Rosa Fernandes (born 26 June 1971), known as just Leandro Samarone, is a former Brazilian football player and manager.

== Career ==
Born in Ribeira, São Paulo, Leandro Samarone began his career in Esporte Clube XV de Novembro's youth system. He played for Associação Atlética Ponte Preta before moving to Russia where he played eight years, including spells with PFC CSKA Moscow and FC Spartak Moscow.

After he retired from playing, Leandro Samarone became a football coach. He was the manager of União Agrícola Barbarense Futebol Clube until June 2005.

== Honours ==
- Russian Premier League champion: 1998.
- Russian Premier League bronze: 2003 (with FC Rubin Kazan).
- Russian Cup winner: 2004 (played in the early stages of the 2003/04 tournament for FC Terek Grozny).

== European club competitions ==
- UEFA Cup 1996–97 with PFC CSKA Moscow: 4 games.
- UEFA Intertoto Cup 1997 with FC Torpedo-Luzhniki Moscow: 4 games, 1 goal.
- UEFA Champions League 1998–99 with FC Spartak Moscow: 3 games, 1 goal.
