= Dmitri Gradilenko =

Russian footballer

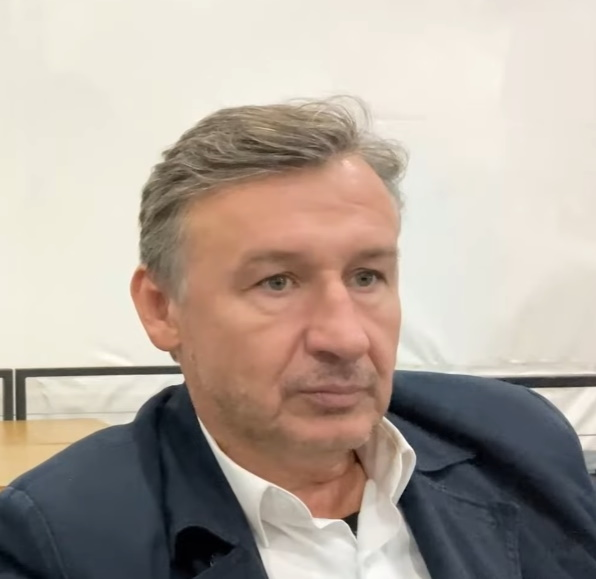
- Gradilenko in 2022

Personal information
- Full name: Dmitri Vitalyevich Gradilenko
- Date of birth: August 12, 1969 (age 57)
- Place of birth: Moscow, Russian SFSR
- Height: 1.79 m (5 ft 10 in)
- Position: Defender

Youth career
- PFC CSKA Moscow

Senior career*
Years	Team	Apps	(Gls)
1986	FC Spartak Moscow	0	(0)
1986–1987	FC Krasnaya Presnya Moscow	29	(0)
1987–1988	FC Spartak Moscow	6	(0)
1989	PFC CSKA Moscow	1	(0)
1989	FC SKA Karpaty Lviv	5	(0)
1989–1993	FC Spartak Moscow	16	(0)
1993	FC Interros Moscow	15	(0)
1994	FC Lada Togliatti	23	(1)
1995	PFC CSKA Moscow	20	(0)
1996–1998	FC Rostselmash Rostov-on-Don	58	(4)
1998	FC Torpedo Moscow	14	(0)
1999	FC Zhemchuzhina Sochi	8	(0)
2000–2001	FC Lokomotiv Nizhny Novgorod	25	(1)
2001	FC Titan Reutov	14	(0)

Managerial career
- 2010–2011: FC Dynamo Bryansk (director of sports)
- 2012–2015: FC Zenit Penza (director of sports)
- * Club domestic league appearances and goals

Dmitri Vitalyevich Gradilenko (Russian: Дмитрий Витальевич Градиленко; born 12 August 1969) is a former Russian professional footballer.

== Club career ==
He made his professional debut in the Soviet Second League in 1986 for FC Krasnaya Presnya Moscow.

== Post-playing career ==
After retirement he worked as a player agent and TV commentator.

On 7 June 2019, Russian Football Union banned him from football activity for one year after he (as a general director of FC Urozhay Krasnodar) offered a 500,000 rubles bonus to FC Chernomorets Novorossiysk before their game against Urozhay's competitor FC Chayka Peschanokopskoye.

== Honours ==
- Soviet Top League champion: 1989.
- Soviet Top League runner-up: 1991.
- Russian Premier League champion: 1993.

== European club competitions ==
With FC Spartak Moscow.

- European Cup 1988–89: 2 games.
- European Cup 1990–91: 4 games.
- UEFA Cup 1991–92: 1 game.
