= Sergei Kulichenko =

Russian footballer (1978–2026)

Personal information
- Full name: Sergei Valeryevich Kulichenko
- Date of birth: 3 February 1978
- Place of birth: Karaganda, Kazakh SSR, Soviet Union
- Date of death: 1 July 2026 (aged 48)
- Height: 1.78 m (5 ft 10 in)
- Position: Striker

Senior career*
| Years | Team | Apps | (Gls) |
| 1996–1997 | CSKA-d Moscow | 65 | (26) |
| 1997 | CSKA Moscow | 6 | (1) |
| 1998 | CSKA-2 Moscow | 14 | (5) |
| 1999 | FC Lantana Tallinn | 10 | (5) |
| 1999 | Krylia Sovetov Samara | 1 | (0) |
| 1999–2000 | KV Mechelen | | |
| 2000 | CSKA Moscow | 3 | (0) |
| 2001 | Lokomotiv Nizhny Novgorod | 4 | (0) |
| 2002 | Torpedo-ZIL Moscow | 9 | (0) |
| 2002–2003 | Fakel-Voronezh Voronezh | 13 | (0) |

International career
| 1999 | Russia U-21 | 2 | (0) |
- * Club domestic league appearances and goals

Sergei Valeryevich Kulichenko (Russian: Сергей Валерьевич Куличенко; 3 February 1978 – 1 July 2026) was a Russian professional footballer and administrator.

== Background ==
Kulichenko was born in Karaganda on 3 February 1978.

His father, Valery Kulichenko (1939-2024), was a renowned Soviet track and field coach. His mother, Valentina Gerasimova (born 1948), was a former world record holder in the 800-meter race.

Sergei Kulichenko died on 1 July 2026, at the age of 48.

== Career ==
Kulichenko played professional football with CSKA Moscow, Torpedo-ZIL Moscow and Fakel-Voronezh Voronezh. After retirement from playing at 25, he became a football administrator in various roles for the Russian Football Union.

== Honours ==
- Russian Third League Zone 3 top scorer: 1997 (21 goals)
