= Valeri Glushakov =

Russian footballer and coach

Personal information
- Full name: Valeri Nikolayevich Glushakov
- Date of birth: March 17, 1959
- Place of birth: Enthusiast sovkhoz, Nura District, Karagandy Province, Kazakh SSR
- Date of death: 29 March 2017 (aged 58)
- Height: 1.82 m (6 ft 0 in)
- Positions: Defender; midfielder

Senior career*
Years	Team	Apps	(Gls)
1976–1977	FC Spartak Moscow	12	(1)
1978	FC Krasnaya Presnya Moscow		
1979	FC Spartak Moscow	7	(1)
1979	FC Pakhtakor Tashkent	16	(1)
1980–1984	PFC CSKA Moscow	130	(8)
1985–1987	FC SKA Rostov-on-Don	91	(3)
1988	PFC CSKA Moscow	40	(0)
1989–1990	FC Kotayk Abovian	69	(1)
1991	Hyvinkään Apollo		
1991–1994	FC Kuusysi	90	(2)
1995	PFC CSKA Moscow	14	(0)
1996	FC Munaishy	11	(0)

Managerial career
- 1997–1998: FC Torpedo Moscow (administrator)
- 2001: FC Nika Moscow
- * Club domestic league appearances and goals

Valeri Nikolayevich Glushakov (Russian: Валерий Николаевич Глушаков; March 17, 1959 in Enthusiast sovkhoz, Nura District, Karagandy Province – March 29, 2017) was a Russian professional football player and coach. He made his professional debut in the Soviet First League in 1977 for FC Spartak Moscow.

== Personal life ==
He was the uncle of Denis Glushakov.

== Honours ==
- Soviet Top League champion: 1979.
- Veikkausliiga champion: 1991.
- Veikkausliiga runner-up: 1992.
