= Deni Gaisumov =

Chechen footballer (born 1968)

Personal information
- Full name: Deni Khasanovich Gaisumov
- Date of birth: 6 February 1968 (age 58)
- Place of birth: Shali, Russian SFSR
- Height: 1.82 m (5 ft 11 1/2 in)
- Position: Defender

Youth career
- FC Terek Grozny

Senior career*
Years	Team	Apps	(Gls)
1989–1991	FC Terek Grozny	86	(0)
1992–1995	Erzu Grozny	73	(1)
1995	PFC CSKA Moscow	10	(2)
1996	FC Sokol-Saratov	32	(1)
1997	FC Spartak Moscow (reserves)	2	(0)
1997	PFC CSKA Moscow	10	(3)
1998–2000	Dubai Club	4	(0)
2001	FC Atyrau	12	(0)
2002–2005	FC Terek Grozny	131	(2)

International career^{‡}
1995–1998	Azerbaijan	23	(0)
- * Club domestic league appearances and goals ‡ National team caps and goals as of 4 October 2008

Deni Khasanovich Gaisumov (born 6 February 1968) is a retired footballer who played 23 times for the Azerbaijan national team.

== Career ==
He was the captain of FC Terek Grozny one of only four Chechens and was named the division's best defender last season 2003 .

== Honours ==
- Won the Russian Cup 2003/04 with FC Terek Grozny.
- Russian First Division best defender: 2004.

== Privates ==
He holds Russian and Azerbaijan citizenship.
