= Dmitri Ulyanov (footballer) =

Russian footballer

Dmitri Ulyanov Дмитрий Ульянов
Personal information
- Full name: Dmitri Nikolayevich Ulyanov
- Date of birth: 28 October 1970 (age 56)
- Place of birth: Moscow, Russian SFSR
- Height: 1.70 m (5 ft 7 in)
- Position: Midfielder

Team information
- Current team: FC Khimki (general director)

Youth career
- FC Torpedo Moscow

Senior career*
Years	Team	Apps	(Gls)
1987–1994	FC Torpedo Moscow	94	(9)
1995–1996	PFC CSKA Moscow	39	(5)
1996–1997	Racing de Santander	6	(0)
1997	PFC CSKA Moscow	13	(1)
1997–2002	Hapoel Haifa	137	(8)
2002–2003	Beitar Jerusalem	10	(0)
2003–2004	Maccabi Ahi Nazareth	28	(0)

Managerial career
- 2006–2009: FC Lokomotiv Moscow (academy scout)
- 2007–2012: Russia U19 (assistant)
- 2010–2016: Russia U21 (assistant)
- 2012–2013: Russia U18
- 2013–2014: Russia U19
- 2014–2015: Russia U15
- 2015–2016: Russia U16
- 2016–2017: Russia U17
- 2018–2019: FC Khimki (head scout)
- 2019–2020: FC Khimki (assistant)
- 2020–2022: FC Khimki (sporting director)
- 2022–: FC Khimki (general director)
- * Club domestic league appearances and goals

Dmitri Nikolayevich Ulyanov (Russian: Дмитрий Николаевич Ульянов; born 28 October 1970) is a Russian professional football coach and a former player. He is the general director of FC Khimki.

== Club career ==
He made his professional debut in the Soviet Top League in 1991 for FC Torpedo Moscow.

== Honours ==
- Soviet Top League bronze: 1991.
- Israeli Premier League champion: 1999
- Israeli Premier League 3rd place: 1998, 2001.
- Soviet Cup finalist: 1991.
- Russian Cup winner: 1993.

== European club competitions ==
- UEFA Cup 1991–92 with FC Torpedo Moscow: 4 games.
- UEFA Cup 1992–93 with FC Torpedo Moscow: 4 games.
- UEFA Cup Winners' Cup 1993–94 with FC Torpedo Moscow: 2 games.
- UEFA Cup 1996–97 with PFC CSKA Moscow: 1 game.
- UEFA Champions League 1999–2000 qualification with Hapoel Haifa F.C.: 2 games.
