= Vladimir Lebed =

Russian footballer (born 1973)

Personal information
- Full name: Vladimir Anatolyevich Lebed
- Date of birth: 17 August 1973 (age 53)
- Place of birth: Kherson, Ukrainian SSR
- Position: Forward

Senior career*
Years	Team	Apps	(Gls)
1991–1992	Dnipro Dnipropetrovsk	24	(7)
1993	Krystal Kherson	13	(5)
1992–1993	Chornomorets Odesa	36	(5)
1993–1994	Tavriya Kherson	11	(8)
1994	Spartak Vladikavkaz	17	(3)
1995–1996	CSKA Moscow	24	(8)
1997	Zenit Saint Petersburg	21	(2)
1998–1999	Sokol Saratov	66	(24)
2000–2002	Torpedo-ZIL Moscow	30	(11)
2002	Volgar-Gazprom Astrakhan	7	(0)
2003–2004	Mykolaiv	13	(0)
2004–2005	Krystal Kherson	11	(1)

International career
1992–1993	Ukraine U21	2	(0)
1993	Russia U20	3	(0)
1994–1995	Russia U21	8	(7)
1995	Russia	1	(0)

Managerial career
- 2006: Krystal Kherson
- 2007: Sihma Kherson (amateurs)
- 2008: Hileya-Invest Hola Prystan (amateurs)
- * Club domestic league appearances and goals

Vladimir Anatolyevich Lebed (Russian: Владимир Анатольевич Лебедь; born 17 August 1973), known as Volodymyr Lebid in Ukrainian, is a former professional footballer who played as a forward. Having represented Ukraine and Russia internationally at youth level, he made one appearance for the Russia senior national team.

== International career ==
Lebed played in one game for Russia on 6 May 1995 in UEFA Euro 1996 qualifier against the Faroe Islands.
