= Dmitri Khokhlov =

Russian footballer and manager

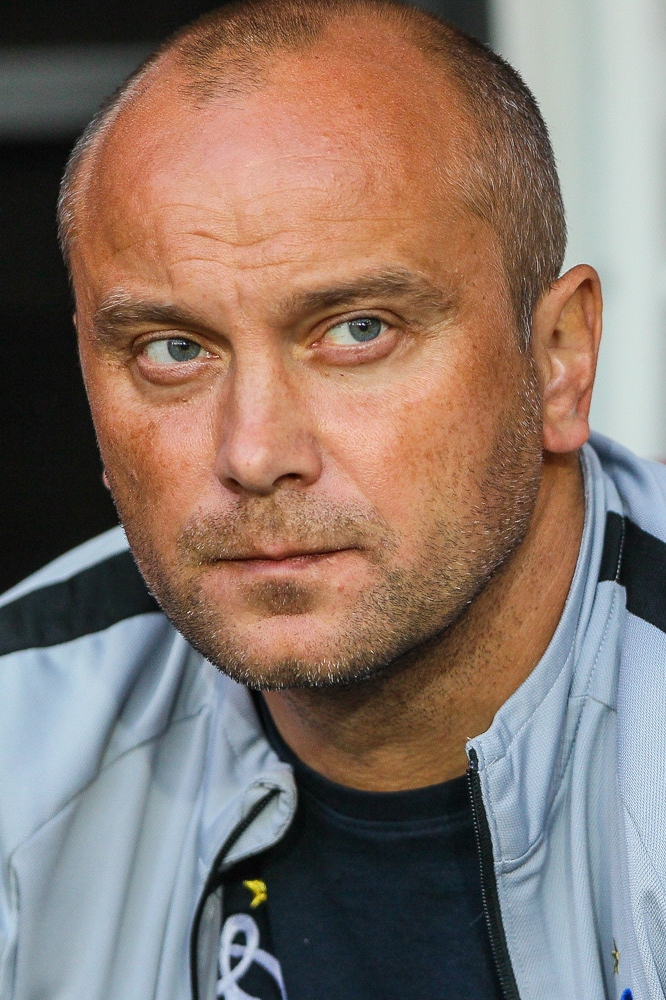
- Khokhlov coaching Dynamo Moscow in 2018

Personal information
- Full name: Dmitri Valeryevich Khokhlov
- Date of birth: 22 December 1975 (age 50)
- Place of birth: Krasnodar, Soviet Union
- Height: 1.89 m (6 ft 2 in)
- Position: Midfielder

Team information
- Current team: Lokomotiv Moscow (U19 manager)

Youth career
- Kuban Krasnodar

Senior career*
Years	Team	Apps	(Gls)
1992–1994	CSKA-d Moscow	65	(14)
1993–1996	CSKA Moscow	62	(15)
1997	Torpedo-Luzhniki Moscow	33	(9)
1997–1999	PSV Eindhoven	60	(9)
1999–2003	Real Sociedad	111	(14)
2003–2005	Lokomotiv Moscow	68	(11)
2006–2010	Dynamo Moscow	130	(11)
Total		529	(83)

International career
1995	Russia U-20	4	(0)
1995–1997	Russia U-21	17	(7)
1996–2005	Russia	53	(6)

Managerial career
- 2011–2012: Dynamo Moscow (assistant)
- 2012–2015: Dynamo Moscow (reserves)
- 2012: Dynamo Moscow (caretaker)
- 2015: Kuban Krasnodar
- 2017: Dynamo-2 Moscow
- 2017: Dynamo Moscow (reserves)
- 2017–2019: Dynamo Moscow
- 2021: Rotor Volgograd
- 2023: Sochi (assistant)
- 2023: Sochi
- 2023–: Lokomotiv Moscow (U19)
- * Club domestic league appearances and goals

Dmitri Valeryevich Khokhlov (Russian: Дми́трий Вале́рьевич Хохло́в, born 22 December 1975) is a Russian football manager and former midfielder who is the manager of the Under-19 squad of Lokomotiv Moscow.

== Playing career ==
Khokhlov played for PFC CSKA Moscow and FC Lokomotiv Moscow in native Russia, having abroad spells with Dutch club PSV Eindhoven and Spanish club Real Sociedad.

During his time with FC Lokomotiv Moscow he participated in their memorable 2003–04 UEFA Champions League campaign, scoring third goal in the 3–0 home victory against Internazionale.

He played for the Russia national team and was a participant at the 2002 FIFA World Cup.He became the winner Cyprus International Football Tournament 2003

== Coaching career ==
Khokhlov won the youth championship with the Under-21 squad of FC Dynamo Moscow twice, in the 2013–14 and 2014–15 seasons.

He resigned as manager of FC Dynamo Moscow on 5 October 2019 following a string of losses and Dynamo in 15th place in the table.

On 28 May 2021, he was hired by the FNL club Rotor Volgograd. He left Rotor by mutual consent on 18 November 2021, with the club two points away from the relegation zone.

On 10 April 2023, Khokhlov was appointed caretaker manager of the RPL club Sochi. He left Sochi by mutual consent on 18 September 2023.

On 14 December 2023, Khokhlov was hired by Lokomotiv Moscow as the manager for their Under-19 squad.

== Personal life ==
His son Igor Khokhlov was also a professional footballer.

In 2022 he sued Facebook for banning his surname due to its association with the word khokhol, which is offensive to Ukrainians.

== Career statistics ==
=== Club ===
Appearances and goals by club, season and competition
Club	Season	League		
Club	Season	Division	Apps	Goals
CSKA-d Moscow	1992		8	0
CSKA-d Moscow	1993		23	4
CSKA-d Moscow	1994		34	10
CSKA-d Moscow	Total		65	14
CSKA Moscow	1993	Russian Top League	1	0
CSKA Moscow	1994	Russian Top League	1	0
CSKA Moscow	1995	Russian Top League	30	5
CSKA Moscow	1996	Russian Top League	30	10
CSKA Moscow	Total		62	15
Torpedo-Luzhniki	1997	Russian Top League	33	9
PSV Eindhoven	1997–98	Eredivisie	14	1
PSV Eindhoven	1998–99	Eredivisie	33	5
PSV Eindhoven	1999–2000	Eredivisie	13	3
PSV Eindhoven	Total		60	9
Real Sociedad	1999–2000	La Liga	21	3
Real Sociedad	2000–01	La Liga	37	4
Real Sociedad	2001–02	La Liga	35	5
Real Sociedad	2002–03	La Liga	18	2
Real Sociedad	Total		111	14
Lokomotiv Moscow	2003	Russian Premier League	14	2
Lokomotiv Moscow	2004	Russian Premier League	24	6
Lokomotiv Moscow	2005	Russian Premier League	30	3
Lokomotiv Moscow	Total		68	11
Dynamo Moscow	2006	Russian Premier League	25	2
Dynamo Moscow	2007	Russian Premier League	29	4
Dynamo Moscow	2008	Russian Premier League	27	2
Dynamo Moscow	2009	Russian Premier League	29	2
Dynamo Moscow	2010	Russian Premier League	20	1
Dynamo Moscow	Total		130	11
Career total			529	83

=== International goals ===
Scores and results list Russia's goal tally first, score column indicates score after each Khokhlov goal.

List of international goals scored by Dmitri Khokhlov
No.	Date	Venue	Opponent	Score	Result	Competition
1	11 October 2000	Central Dynamo Stadium, Moscow, Russia	Luxembourg	2–0	3–0	2002 FIFA World Cup qualification
2	28 February 2001	Theodoros Vardinogiannis Stadium, Heraklion, Greece	Greece	2–2	3–3	Friendly
3	24 March 2001	Luzhniki Stadium, Moscow, Russia	Slovenia	1–0	1–1	2002 FIFA World Cup qualification
4	14 November 2001	Skonto Stadium, Riga, Latvia	Latvia	1–0	3–1	Friendly
5	12 February 2003	Tsirio Stadium, Limassol, Cyprus	Cyprus	1–0	1–0	2003 Cyprus International Football Tournament
6	18 August 2004	Central Dynamo Stadium, Moscow, Russia	Lithuania	1–0	4–3	Friendly

== Honours ==
- Eredivisie champion, 2000
- Johan Cruyff Shield Winner, 1998
- Russian Premier League champion, 2004
- Russian Super Cup winner, 2005
