= Taras Bezubyak =

Soviet and Russian football referee

Taras Mikhailovich Bezubyak (Russian: Тарас Михайлович Безубяк; born 25 July 1955 in Chortkiv, USSR) is a Soviet and Russian football referee, one of Russia's most respected arbiters 90s. International judge FIFA referee.

From 1977 to 2003, he served more than 300 games at various levels of professional football.
