= Aleksei Gerasimov (footballer, born 1973) =

Russian footballer

Aleksei Gerasimov Алексей Владимирович Герасимов
Personal information
- Full name: Aleksei Vladimirovich Gerasimov
- Date of birth: 13 January 1973 (age 53)
- Height: 1.74 m (5 ft 9 in)
- Positions: Midfielder; forward

Youth career
- DYuSSh-8 Nizhny Novgorod

Senior career*
Years	Team	Apps	(Gls)
1989–1990	FC Khimik Dzerzhinsk	4	(0)
1990	FC Lokomotiv Nizhny Novgorod	0	(0)
1991	FC Khimik Dzerzhinsk	9	(3)
1991–1994	FC Lokomotiv Nizhny Novgorod	76	(6)
1995–1997	PFC CSKA Moscow	74	(18)
1997–1998	Maccabi Tel Aviv F.C.	9	(0)
1998–1999	FC Lokomotiv Nizhny Novgorod	20	(4)
1999	FC Torpedo-ZIL Moscow	16	(1)
2000–2001	FC Metallurg Krasnoyarsk	33	(4)
2001	FC Lokomotiv Nizhny Novgorod	13	(1)
2002	FC Tobol	30	(8)
2003	FC Yelimay Semipalatinsk	13	(3)
2004	FC Oryol	5	(0)
2004	FC Lokomotiv-NN Nizhny Novgorod	7	(0)

International career
1994–1995	Russia U-21	5	(0)
- * Club domestic league appearances and goals

Aleksei Vladimirovich Gerasimov (Russian: Алексей Владимирович Герасимов; born 13 January 1973) is a Russian former professional footballer.

== Club career ==
He made his professional debut in the Soviet Second League B in 1990 for FC Khimik Dzerzhinsk. He played 4 games in the UEFA Cup 1996–97 for PFC CSKA Moscow.

== Honours ==
- Kazakhstan Premier League bronze: 2002.
