= Tigran Petrosyants =

Armenian footballer

Personal information
- Full name: Tigran Rudolf Petrosyants
- Date of birth: 23 December 1973 (age 52)
- Place of birth: Yerevan, Soviet Union
- Height: 1.78 m (5 ft 10 in)
- Position: Midfielder

Team information
- Current team: Ararat-Armenia II (manager)

Senior career*
Years	Team	Apps	(Gls)
1992–1994	Kotayk Abovian	83	(21)
1994–1995	CSKA Moscow	10	(0)
1995–1996	Zhemchuzhina Sochi	37	(0)
1996–1997	Torpedo Moscow	10	(0)
1997–1997	CSKA Moscow	5	(0)
1997–1998	Uralan Elista	16	(1)
1999–2000	Krylia Sovetov Samara	50	(2)
2000–2001	Uralan Elista	12	(0)
2001–2002	Volgar-Gazprom Astrakhan	14	(0)
2002–2003	Chernomorets Novorossiysk	3	(0)
2003–2004	Arsenal Tula	5	(0)
2004–2005	Nika Moscow	25	(2)

International career
1999 – 2000	Armenia	8	(0)

Managerial career
- 2015: Armenia U17
- 2016: Armenia U16
- 2020–: Ararat-Armenia II
- * Club domestic league appearances and goals

Tigran Petrosyants (Armenian: Տիգրան Պետրոսյանց, born 23 December 1973) is an Armenian football coach and a former midfielder. He is the manager of Ararat-Armenia II.

== International career ==
He was a member of the Armenia national team and participated in 8 international matches.
