= Dmitri Karsakov =

Russian footballer

Personal information
- Full name: Dmitri Borisovich Karsakov
- Date of birth: 29 December 1971 (age 54)
- Place of birth: Moscow, Soviet Union
- Height: 1.78 m (5 ft 10 in)
- Position: Midfielder

Youth career
- Torpedo Moscow

Senior career*
| Years | Team | Apps | (Gls) |
| 1989 | Torpedo Moscow | 0 | (0) |
| 1990 | Zvezda Moscow | 30 | (7) |
| 1991 | CSKA Moscow | 1 | (0) |
| 1991 | KAMAZ Naberezhnye Chelny | 17 | (4) |
| 1992–1993 | CSKA Moscow | 44 | (4) |
| 1994 | Dynamo Moscow | 0 | (0) |
| 1994 | Torpedo Moscow | 7 | (1) |
| 1995–1996 | CSKA Moscow | 51 | (12) |
| 1996 | Bucheon Yukong | 3 | (0) |
| 1997 | CSKA Moscow | 4 | (0) |
| 1998–2000 | Slavia Mozyr | 82 | (13) |
| 2001 | Nosorogi Volodarsky | | |
| 2002–2004 | Gomel | 73 | (11) |
| 2005 | Nosta Novotroitsk | 16 | (1) |
| 2008 | TEKS Ivanteyevka | | |

International career
| 1990–1991 | USSR U-20 | 6 | (0) |
| 1992–1994 | Russia U-21 | 9 | (0) |
- * Club domestic league appearances and goals

Dmitri Borisovich Karsakov (Russian: Дмитрий Борисович Карсаков; born 29 December 1971) is a Russian former football midfielder.

== International ==
He played in 6 matches for the USSR U-20 team at the 1991 U-20 World Cup.

== European club competitions ==
With PFC CSKA Moscow.

- UEFA Champions League 1992–93: 10 games, 3 goals.
- UEFA Cup 1996–97: 1 game, 1 goal.
