= 2000 PFC CSKA Moscow season =

CSKA
2000 season
- Manager: Oleg Dolmatov (until May); Pavel Sadyrin (from May)
- Stadium: Dynamo Stadium; Grigory Fedotov Stadium
- Top Division: 8th
- Russian Cup: Runners Up vs Lokomotiv Moscow
- Russian Cup: Last 16 vs Anzhi Makhachkala
- UEFA Cup: First Round vs Viborg
- Top goalscorer: League: Vladimir Kulik (10); All: Vladimir Kulik (15)

The 2000 CSKA season was the club's ninth season in the Russian Top Division, the highest tier of association football in Russia.

== Squad ==
As of match played 12 November 2000

Name	Nationality	Position	Date of birth (age)	Signed from	Signed in	Contract ends	Apps.	Goals
Goalkeepers
Vitali Baranov	(Russia)	GK	25 January 1980 (aged 20)	Zenit Izhevsk	1998		1	0
Andrei Novosadov	(Russia)	GK	27 March 1972 (aged 28)	KAMAZ	1993		90	0
Yuri Okroshidze	(Russia)	GK	23 August 1970 (aged 30)	Rubin Kazan	2000		22	0
Defenders
Maksim Bokov	(Russia)	DF	29 August 1973 (aged 27)	Zenit St.Petersburg	1997		125	2
Rustem Bulatov	(Russia)	DF	2 April 1974 (aged 26)	Shinnik Yaroslavl	2000		27	4
Oleg Kornaukhov	(Russia)	DF	14 January 1975 (aged 25)	Shinnik Yaroslavl	1998		95	8
Valeri Minko	(Russia)	DF	8 August 1971 (aged 29)	Dynamo Barnaul	1989		253	12
Andrei Tsaplin	(Russia)	DF	22 January 1977 (aged 23)	Academy	1996		67	1
Yevgeni Varlamov	(Russia)	DF	25 July 1975 (aged 25)	KAMAZ	1998		91	11
Denis Yevsikov	(Russia)	DF	19 February 1981 (aged 19)	Academy	1999		15	0
Zaur Mamutov	(Ukraine)	DF	22 January 1980 (aged 20)	Spartak Kostroma	2000		1	0
Midfielders
Askhat Kadyrkulov	(Kazakhstan)	MF	14 November 1974 (aged 25)	Kairat	2000		11	0
Oleg Șișchin	(Moldova)	MF	7 January 1975 (aged 25)	Constructorul Chișinău	1999		46	6
Sergei Filippenkov	(Russia)	MF	2 August 1971 (aged 29)	CSK VVS-Kristall Smolensk	1998		93	17
Artyom Kovalenko	(Russia)	MF	6 August 1981 (aged 19)	Academy	1999		1	0
Mikhail Lunin	(Russia)	MF	31 May 1978 (aged 22)	K.R.C. Harelbeke	2000		14	1
Stanislav Lysenko	(Russia)	MF	8 January 1972 (aged 28)	Rubin Kazan	2000		8	0
Sergei Rodin	(Russia)	MF	24 January 1981 (aged 19)	Academy	1999		7	0
Aleksei Savelyev	(Russia)	MF	10 April 1977 (aged 23)	Torpedo Moscow	1997		88	7
Sergei Semak	(Russia)	MF	27 February 1976 (aged 24)	Asmaral Moscow	1994		205	52
Aleksandr Shvetsov	(Russia)	MF	17 December 1980 (aged 19)	Academy	1998		1	0
Aleksei Smetanin	(Russia)	MF	19 March 1981 (aged 19)	Academy	1999		1	0
Artyom Yenin	(Russia)	MF	6 August 1976 (aged 24)	Shinnik Yaroslavl	2000		6	0
Marek Hollý	(Slovakia)	MF	20 August 1973 (aged 27)	Lokomotiv Nizhny Novgorod	2000		31	2
Dmitri Khomukha	(Turkmenistan)	MF	23 August 1969 (aged 31)	Zenit St.Petersburg	1997		132	30
Maksym Biletskyi	(Ukraine)	MF	7 January 1980 (aged 20)	Academy	1998		1	0
Davron Fayziev	(Uzbekistan)	MF	16 January 1976 (aged 24)	Sogdiana Jizzakh	2000		8	0
Forwards
Aleksei Bychkov	(Russia)	FW	8 November 1972 (aged 28)	Shinnik Yaroslavl	2000		30	10
Ivan Danshin	(Russia)	FW	20 April 1982 (aged 18)	Academy	2000		11	1
Sergei Kulichenko	(Russia)	FW	3 February 1978 (aged 22)	Academy	1997		9	1
Vladimir Kulik	(Russia)	FW	18 February 1972 (aged 28)	Zenit St.Petersburg	1997		136	61
Aleksandr Suchkov	(Russia)	FW	29 February 1980 (aged 20)	Fabus Bronnitsy	1998		3	0
Out on loan
Vadim Skripchenko	(Belarus)	MF	26 November 1975 (aged 24)	BATE Borisov	2000		9	0
Left During the Season
Ihor Kutepov	(Ukraine)	GK	17 December 1965 (aged 34)	Tyumen	1997		30	0
Vyacheslav Geraschenko	(Belarus)	DF	25 July 1972 (aged 28)	Chernomorets Novorossiysk	2000		11	0
Aleksandr Lebedev	(Russia)	MF	1 April 1981 (aged 19)	Academy	1999		1	0
Albert Oskolkov	(Russia)	DF	9 August 1973 (aged 27)	Torpedo-ZIL Moscow	2000		9	0

== Transfers ==
In: Note: Flags indicate national team as defined under FIFA eligibility rules; some limited exceptions apply. Players may hold more than one non-FIFA nationality.

No.	Pos.	Nation	Player
—	GK	RUS	Andrei Novosadov (from (Russia) Lokomotiv Nizhny Novgorod)
—	GK	RUS	Yuri Okroshidze (from (Russia) Rubin Kazan)
—	GK	UKR	Ihor Kutepov (from (Russia) Spartak Shchyolkovo)
—	DF	BLR	Vyacheslav Geraschenko (from (Russia) Chernomorets Novorossiysk)
—	DF	RUS	Rustem Bulatov (from (Russia) Rubin Kazan)
—	MF	BLR	Vadim Skripchenko (from (Belarus) BATE Borisov)
—	MF	KAZ	Askhat Kadyrkulov (from (Kazakhstan) Shakhter Karagandy)
—	MF	RUS	Mikhail Lunin (from (Russia) Spartak-Chukotka Moscow)
—	MF	RUS	Aleksei Savelyev (loan return from (Russia) Lokomotiv Nizhny Novgorod)
—	MF	SVK	Marek Hollý (from (Russia) Alania Vladikavkaz)
—	MF	UZB	Davron Fayziev (from (Uzbekistan) Dinamo Samarqand)
—	FW	RUS	Aleksei Bychkov (from (Russia) Shinnik Yaroslavl)

Out: Note: Flags indicate national team as defined under FIFA eligibility rules; some limited exceptions apply. Players may hold more than one non-FIFA nationality.

No.	Pos.	Nation	Player
—	GK	RUS	Dmitri Goncharov (to (Russia) Fakel Voronezh)
—	GK	UKR	Ihor Kutepov
—	DF	BLR	Vyacheslav Geraschenko (to (Belarus) Slavia Mozyr)
—	DF	RUS	Denis Pervushin (to (Belarus) Slavia Mozyr)
—	DF	RUS	Albert Oskolkov (to (Russia) Metallurg Krasnoyarsk)
—	MF	BLR	Vadim Skripchenko (loan to (Belarus) BATE Borisov)
—	MF	RUS	Igor Aksyonov (to (Russia) Lokomotiv Nizhny Novgorod)
—	MF	RUS	Aleksandr Grishin (to (Russia) Fakel Voronezh)
—	MF	RUS	Aleksandr Lebedev (to (Russia) Fabus Bronnitsy)
—	MF	RUS	Viktor Navochenko (to (Russia) Saturn Ramenskoye)
—	MF	RUS	Aleksei Savelyev (loan to (Russia) Lokomotiv Nizhny Novgorod)
—	MF	SVK	Marek Hollý (to (Russia) Alania Vladikavkaz)
—	FW	RUS	Magomed Adiyev (to (Russia) Spartak-2 Moscow)

== Competitions ==
=== Top Division ===
==== Results by round ====
Round	1	2	3	4	5	6	7	8	9	10	11	12	13	14	15	16	17	18	19	20	21	22	23	24	25	26	27	28	29	30
Ground	A	H	A	H	A	H	A	H	A	H	A	H	A	H	H	A	H	A	H	A	H	A	H	A	H	A	H	A	A	H
Result	L	D	L	L	L	L	L	W	W	D	L	L	W	L	D	L	W	L	W	W	W	W	D	D	W	L	W	W	L	W

Updated to match(es) played on 12 November 2000. Source: See Results
A = Away; H = Home; W = Win; D = Draw; L = Loss

==== Results ====
24 March 2000 1	Lokomotiv Moscow	1 – 0	CSKA Moscow	Moscow
19:00 MSK (UTC+3)	Solomatin (yellow card) 26'; Janashia (yellow card) 27' (goal) 77'; Drozdov (yellow card) 48'; Loskov (yellow card) 68'; Cherevchenko (yellow card) 83'	Report	Geraschenko (yellow card) 9'; Bokov (yellow card) 40'	Stadium: Lokomotiv Stadium; Referee: Nikolai Ivanov

1 April 2000 2	CSKA Moscow	0 – 0	Saturn Ramenskoye	Moscow
19:00 MSK (UTC+4)	Bokov (yellow card) 43'; Kulik (yellow card) 89'	Report	Zhabko (yellow card) 14'	Stadium: Dynamo Stadium; Referee: G.Kulichenkov

8 April 2000 3	Krylia Sovetov	2 – 0	CSKA Moscow	Samara
15:00 MSK (UTC+4)	Tsiklauri 36' (yellow card) 64'; Konovalov 60'; Ivanov (yellow card) 71'	Report	Oskolkov (yellow card) 16'; Tsaplin (yellow card) 39'; Kornaukhov (yellow card) 64'; Filippenkov (yellow card) 88'	Stadium: Metallurg Stadium; Referee: Taras Bezubyak

15 April 2000 4	CSKA Moscow	0 – 3	Chernomorets Novorossiysk	Moscow
19:00 MSK (UTC+4)	Filippenkov (yellow card) 37'; Bulatov (yellow card) 41'; Khomukha (yellow card) 46'; Kornaukhov (yellow card) 87'	Report	Pryzetko 11', 76'; Kakosyan 14'; Morozov (yellow card) 25'; Svystunov (yellow card) 48'; Mayorov (yellow card) 90'	Stadium: Dynamo Stadium; Referee: Nikolai Levnikov

22 April 2000 5	Spartak Moscow	1 – 0	CSKA Moscow	Moscow
17:00 MSK (UTC+4)	Bushmanov (yellow card) 7' (yellow-red card) 69'; Titov (yellow card) 73' (goal) 88' (pen.); Mor (yellow card) 77'	Report	Oskolkov (yellow card) 8' (yellow-red card) 74'; Yenin (yellow card) 20'; Kornaukhov (yellow card) 70'; Filippenkov (yellow card) 72'; Semak (yellow card) 90'	Stadium: Lokomotiv Stadium; Referee: Yuri Baskakov

29 April 2000 6	CSKA Moscow	0 – 2	Torpedo Moscow	Moscow
19:00 MSK (UTC+4)	Bulatov (yellow card) 9'; Bokov (yellow card) 20'; Tsaplin (yellow card) 34'	Report	Vyazmikin (yellow card) 39' (goal) 44', 61'; Kazakov (yellow card) 42'	Stadium: Dynamo Stadium; Referee: V.Lebedev

7 May 2000 7	Fakel Voronezh	2 – 1	CSKA Moscow	Voronezh
18:30 MSK (UTC+4)	Cherkes (yellow card) 28'; Grishin 43' (yellow card) 48'; Syomin 78'	Report	Okroshidze (red card) 21'; Varlamov 70'	Stadium: Tsentralnyi Profsoyuz Stadion; Referee: G.Yarygin

12 May 2000 8	CSKA Moscow	4 – 1	Zenit St.Petersburg	Moscow
17:00 MSK (UTC+4)	Șișchin (yellow card) 53' (goal) 82'; Kulik 67' (pen.); Bychkov 77', 87'; Filippenkov (yellow card) 82'	Report	Igonin 11'; Curteian (yellow card) 21'; Haravoy (yellow card) 42'	Stadium: Grigory Fedotov Stadium; Referee: N.Frolov

17 May 2000 9	Rotor Volgograd	0 – 1	CSKA Moscow	Volgograd
18:00 MSK (UTC+4)	Parmuzin (yellow card) 62'	Report	Kulik 11'; Skripchenko (yellow card) 32'	Stadium: Central Profsoyuz Stadium; Referee: S.Gusev

27 May 2000 10	CSKA Moscow	1 – 1	Rostselmash	Moscow
18:00 MSK (UTC+4)	Kulik 17' (pen.) (penalty missed) 81'; Minko (yellow card) 20'; Șișchin (yellow card) 45'	Report	Blyznyuk (yellow card) 16'; Smakov (yellow card) 17'; Ivanov (yellow card) 70'; Kirichenko 75' (yellow card) 78'; Fomenka (yellow card) 80'	Stadium: Grigory Fedotov Stadium; Referee: Yu.Chebotarev

8 June 2000 11	Anzhi Makhachkala	4 – 1	CSKA Moscow	Makhachkala
19:00 MSK (UTC+4)	Peremenin (yellow card) 14'; Ranđelović 45' (pen.); Sirkhayev 51', 89'; Agalarov 82'	Report	Khomukha 17' (pen.); Bokov (yellow card) 32'; Semak (yellow card) 83'	Stadium: Dynamo Stadium; Referee: Yuri Klyuchnikov

13 June 2000 12	CSKA Moscow	0 – 1	Alania Vladikavkaz	Moscow
18:00 MSK (UTC+4)	Kornaukhov (yellow card) 24'	Report	Tarlowski (yellow card) 13'; Tsereteli (yellow card) 15'; Kutarba (yellow card) 24' (goal) 42'; Borysenko (yellow card) 70'; Mandrykin (yellow card) 80'	Stadium: Grigory Fedotov Stadium; Referee: Sergey Lapochkin

18 June 2000 13	Lokomotiv Nizhny Novgorod	1 – 2	CSKA Moscow	Nizhny Novgorod
18:00 MSK (UTC+4)	Sayun (yellow card) 19'; Savelyev 78'	Report	Kulik 3' (pen.), 52' (pen.) (yellow card) 20'; Varlamov (yellow card) 20'; Minko (yellow card) 28'	Stadium: Lokomotiv Stadium; Referee: Sergei Fursa

22 June 2000 14	CSKA Moscow	0 – 2	Uralan Elista	Moscow
19:00 MSK (UTC+4)	Kornaukhov (yellow card) 48'	Report	Jefferson 65'; Avalyan 73'	Stadium: Grigory Fedotov Stadium; Referee: Taras Bezubyak

27 June 2000 15	CSKA Moscow	2 – 2	Dynamo Moscow	Moscow
19:00 MSK (UTC+4)	Șișchin 15' (yellow card) 56'; Khomukha 71'	Report	Grishin 4'; Shtanyuk (yellow card) 41'; Romaschenko 53'	Stadium: Dynamo Stadium; Referee: A.Kozhukhov

8 July 2000 16	Saturn Ramenskoye	2 – 1	CSKA Moscow	Ramenskoye
18:00 MSK (UTC+4)	Katasonov (yellow card) 18'; Movsisyan 36' (pen.); Sosnovschi (yellow card) 42'; Rogaciov 88'	Report	Kutepov (yellow card) 36'; Kornaukhov (yellow card) 36'; Khomukha 68' (pen.); Semak (yellow card) 89'	Stadium: Saturn Stadium; Referee: Yu.Chebotarev

15 July 2000 17	CSKA Moscow	2 – 0	Krylia Sovetov	Moscow
19:00 MSK (UTC+4)	Bychkov 44'; Semak 64'; Filippenkov (yellow card) 85'	Report	Samarone (yellow card) 39'; Edu (yellow card) 40'; Petrosyants (yellow card) 66'	Stadium: Grigory Fedotov Stadium; Referee: S.Andreev

22 July 2000 18	Chernomorets Novorossiysk	3 – 0	CSKA Moscow	Novorossiysk
19:30 MSK (UTC+4)	Pushkutsa 13'; Mashkarin (yellow card) 42'; Kuzmichyov 47'; Pryzetko 58' (pen.)	Report		Stadium: Central Stadium; Referee: G.Kulichenkov

29 July 2000 19	CSKA Moscow	2 – 1	Spartak Moscow	Moscow
19:00 MSK (UTC+4)	Savelyev 1' (yellow card) 28'; Bokov (yellow card) 32' (yellow-red card) 85'; Bychkov 63'; Varlamov (yellow card) 76' (yellow-red card) 77'	Report	Khizaneishvili (yellow card) 25' (yellow-red card) 41'; Štolcers 48'; Kovtun (yellow card) 57'; Robson (red card) 77'; Tikhonov (yellow card) 77'	Stadium: Dynamo Stadium; Referee: A.Kozhukhov

5 August 2000 20	Torpedo Moscow	0 – 1	CSKA Moscow	Moscow
19:00 MSK (UTC+4)	Trakys (yellow card) 55'; Leonchenko (yellow card) 69'; Kornyukhin (yellow card) 78'; Lukhvich (yellow card) 82'	Report	Khomukha 67'; Yevsikov (yellow card) 77'; Bulatov (yellow card) 87'	Stadium: Luzhniki Stadium; Referee: G.Zhafyarov

13 August 2000 21	CSKA Moscow	5 – 1	Fakel Voronezh	Moscow
17:00 MSK (UTC+4)	Filippenkov 24'; Khomukha 30' (pen.), 33' (pen.) (yellow card) 37'; Savelyev (yellow card) 61'; Bychkov 64', 65'	Report	Grishin (yellow card) 18'; Shukanov (yellow card) 32' (goal) 45'	Stadium: Grigory Fedotov Stadium; Referee: Sergei Fursa

18 August 2000 22	Zenit St.Petersburg	0 – 1	CSKA Moscow	Saint Petersburg
19:00 MSK (UTC+4)	Nedorezov (yellow card) 81'; Curteian (yellow card) 87'	Report	Bokov (yellow card) 32'; Semak 47'	Stadium: Petrovsky Stadium; Referee: S.Gusev

26 August 2000 23	CSKA Moscow	1 – 1	Rotor Volgograd	Moscow
16:30 MSK (UTC+4)	Varlamov 77'	Report	Pavlyuchenko 5'; Yesipov (yellow card) 9'; Mogilevskiy (yellow card) 65'; Matiola (yellow card) 78'	Stadium: Grigory Fedotov Stadium; Referee: Yuri Klyuchnikov

6 September 2000 24	Rostselmash	1 – 1	CSKA Moscow	Rostov-on-Don
17:00 MSK (UTC+4)	Fomenka (yellow card) 8'; Kirichenko 15'; Ivanov (yellow card) 80'	Report	Semak 82'	Stadium: Olimp-2; Referee: Sergey Lapochkin

22 September 2000 25	CSKA Moscow	4 – 0	Anzhi Makhachkala	Moscow
16:30 MSK (UTC+4)	Kulik 16'; Semak 21', 53'; Lunin 90'	Report		Stadium: Grigory Fedotov Stadium; Referee: N.Frolov

1 October 2000 26	Alania Vladikavkaz	2 – 1	CSKA Moscow	Vladikavkaz
17:00 MSK (UTC+4)	Ashvetia 10', 31'; Tsereteli (yellow card) 15'	Report	Bokov (yellow card) 35'; Filippenkov 69'	Stadium: Republican Spartak Stadium; Referee: S.Andreev

14 October 2000 27	CSKA Moscow	5 – 0	Lokomotiv Nizhny Novgorod	Moscow
16:00 MSK (UTC+4)	Kulik 3'; Savelyev 30'; Filippenkov 32'; Kadyrkulov (yellow card) 33'; Semak 56' (pen.); Bulatov (yellow card) 66'; Bychkov 87'	Report	Popkhadze (yellow card) 44'; Alpatov (yellow card) 59'; Morozov (yellow card) 74'; Drăguș (yellow card) 83'	Stadium: Grigory Fedotov Stadium; Referee: Nikolai Ivanov

22 October 2000 28	Uralan Elista	1 – 5	CSKA Moscow	Elista
16:00 MSK (UTC+4)	Jefferson 48' (yellow card) 70'	Report	Semak 4'; Kulik 15', 20'; Khomukha 42'; Danshin 67'	Stadium: Uralan Stadium; Referee: A.Tyumin

5 November 2000 29	Dynamo Moscow	1 – 0	CSKA Moscow	Moscow
17:00 MSK (UTC+3)	Gogniyev 23'; Kozlov (yellow card) 45'; Grishin (yellow card) 88'	Report	Yevsikov (yellow card) 68'	Stadium: Dynamo Stadium; Referee: G.Zhafyarov

12 November 2000 30	CSKA Moscow	4 – 3	Lokomotiv Moscow	Moscow
17:00 MSK (UTC+3)	Kulik 3'; Semak 19'; Rodin (yellow card) 44'; Varlamov (yellow card) 49'; Șișchin (yellow card) 68'; Kornaukhov 71' (pen.); Kulichenko (yellow card) 84'; Yevsikov (yellow card) 88'	Report	Kharlachyov (yellow card) 44'; Teryokhin (penalty missed) 49' 49', 63' (pen.); Evseev (yellow card) 83'; Sennikov 90'	Stadium: Dynamo Stadium; Referee: Yuri Baskakov

==== Table ====
Pos	Team	Pld	W	D	L	GF	GA	GD	Pts	Qualification or relegation
6	Chernomorets Novorossiysk (Note: Chernomorets qualified for the UEFA Cup thanks to Lokomotiv winning the Russian Cup in 2001.)	30	13	10	7	47	28	+19	49	Qualification to UEFA Cup first round
7	Zenit St. Petersburg	30	13	8	9	38	26	+12	47	
8	CSKA Moscow	30	12	5	13	45	39	+6	41	
9	Saturn	30	10	10	10	26	29	−3	40	
10	Alania Vladikavkaz	30	10	8	12	34	36	−2	38	

Source: rsssf.com
Rules for classification: 1) points; 2) goal difference; 3) number of goals scored.

=== Russian Cup ===
==== 1999–2000 ====
11 April 2000 Quarterfinal	Anzhi Makhachkala	1 – 1 (3 – 5 p)	CSKA Moscow	Astrakhan
17:00 MSK (UTC+4)	Stojković (yellow card) 16'; Oskolkov 22' (o.g.); Rahimić (yellow card) 30'; Agalarov (yellow card) 51'; Gordeyev (yellow card) 74'	Report	Bychkov 31'; Bulatov (yellow card) 31'; Kornaukhov (yellow card) 32'; Khomukha (yellow card) 61'; Skripchenko (yellow card) 115'	Stadium: Central Stadium; Referee: Sergey Lapochkin
	Penalties
	Agalarov (penalty scored); Akayev (penalty scored); Sirkhayev (penalty scored); Gordeyev (penalty missed)		Kulik (penalty scored); Oskolkov (penalty scored); Bulatov (penalty scored); Semak (penalty scored); Kornaukhov (penalty scored)

4 May 2000 Semifinal	CSKA Moscow	3 – 1	Spartak Moscow	Moscow
19:30 MSK (UTC+4)	Minko (yellow card) 20'; Khomukha (penalty missed) 21'; Kulik 21', 59'; Varlamov (yellow card) 21' (goal) 41'; Șișchin (yellow card) 64'	Report	Kovtun (yellow card) 35'; Titov (penalty missed) 39' (yellow card) 69'; Robson 61'	Stadium: Dynamo Stadium; Referee: G.Zhafyarov

21 May 2000 Final	Lokomotiv Moscow	3 – 2 (a.e.t.)	CSKA Moscow	Moscow
17:00 MSK (UTC+4)	Loskov (yellow card) 15' (yellow-red card) 66'; Cherevchenko (yellow card) 37'; Yevseyev 41'; Bulykin 96'; Tsymbalar 113'	Report	Bokov (red card) 21'; Semak 32'; Skripchenko (yellow card) 39'; Kornaukhov (penalty missed) 120' 120'	Stadium: Dynamo Stadium; Attendance: 26,000; Referee: Nikolai Levnikov

==== 2000–2001 ====
10 September 2000 Round of 32	Shinnik Yaroslavl	1 – 6	CSKA Moscow	Yaroslavl
17:00 MSK (UTC+4)	Novgorodov 37' (pen.)	Report	Kulik 12', 21', 32'; Bychkov 61'; Savelyev 63'; Kornaukhov 67'	Stadium: Shinnik Stadium; Referee: A.Gvardis

28 October 2000 Last 16	CSKA Moscow	1 – 3	Anzhi Makhachkala	Moscow
14:30 MSK (UTC+3)	Fayziev (yellow card) 12'; Kornaukhov 17'; Semak (penalty missed) 26'	Report	Akayev (yellow card) 7'; Adiyev 15', 42'; Bamatov (yellow card) 45'; Sirkhayev 53'; Tebloyev (yellow card) 63'; Yaskovich (yellow card) 73'	Stadium: Grigory Fedotov Stadium; Referee: G.Kulichenkov

=== UEFA Cup ===
==== First round ====
14 September 2000 First round 1st leg	CSKA Moscow (Russia)	0 – 0	(Denmark) Viborg	Moscow, Russia
20:00 MSK (UTC+4)		Report	Fernandez (yellow card) 33'	Stadium: Dynamo Stadium; Referee: Georgios Douros (Greece)

26 September 2000 First round 2nd leg	Viborg (Denmark)	1 – 0 (a.e.t.) (1 – 0 agg.)	(Russia) CSKA Moscow	Silkeborg, Denmark
MSK (UTC+4)	M.Poulsen (yellow card) 17'; Tengstedt (yellow card) 55'; Kærgaard 101'	Report	Kornaukhov (yellow card) 26'; Fayziev (yellow card) 51'; Minko (yellow card) 62'; Șișchin (yellow card) 115'	Stadium: Silkeborg Stadion; Referee: Jouni Hyytiä (Iceland)

== Squad statistics ==
As of match played 12 November 2000

=== Appearances and goals ===
No.	Pos	Nat	Player	Total		Top Division		1999–2000 Russian Cup		2000–01 Russian Cup		UEFA Cup	
No.	Pos	Nat	Player	Apps	Goals	Apps	Goals	Apps	Goals	Apps	Goals	Apps	Goals
	GK	(Russia) RUS	Vitali Baranov	1	0	1	0	0	0	0	0	0	0
	GK	(Russia) RUS	Andrei Novosadov	9	0	5	0	0	0	2	0	2	0
	GK	(Russia) RUS	Yuri Okroshidze	22	0	19	0	3	0	0	0	0	0
	DF	(Russia) RUS	Maksim Bokov	27	0	22	0	2	0	1	0	2	0
	DF	(Russia) RUS	Rustem Bulatov	27	0	21	0	2	0	2	0	1+1	0
	DF	(Russia) RUS	Oleg Kornaukhov	32	4	24+1	1	3	1	2	2	2	0
	DF	(Russia) RUS	Valeri Minko	23	0	15+4	0	2	0	0+1	0	1	0
	DF	(Russia) RUS	Andrei Tsaplin	10	0	5+4	0	0	0	1	0	0	0
	DF	(Russia) RUS	Yevgeni Varlamov	34	3	26+1	2	3	1	2	0	2	0
	DF	(Russia) RUS	Denis Yevsikov	12	0	8+1	0	2	0	0+1	0	0	0
	DF	(Ukraine) UKR	Zaur Mamutov	1	0	0+1	0	0	0	0	0	0	0
	MF	(Kazakhstan) KAZ	Askhat Kadyrkulov	11	0	5+2	0	0	0	0+2	0	1+1	0
	MF	(Moldova) MDA	Oleg Șișchin	27	2	13+9	2	1+1	0	0+1	0	1+1	0
	MF	(Russia) RUS	Sergei Filippenkov	28	3	19+6	3	2+1	0	0	0	0	0
	MF	(Russia) RUS	Mikhail Lunin	14	1	5+5	1	0	0	2	0	2	0
	MF	(Russia) RUS	Stanislav Lysenko	8	0	4+4	0	0	0	0	0	0	0
	MF	(Russia) RUS	Sergei Rodin	5	0	1+4	0	0	0	0	0	0	0
	MF	(Russia) RUS	Aleksei Savelyev	16	1	12+1	0	0	0	2	1	1	0
	MF	(Russia) RUS	Sergei Semak	37	9	30	8	3	1	2	0	2	0
	MF	(Russia) RUS	Aleksandr Shvetsov	1	0	0+1	0	0	0	0	0	0	0
	MF	(Russia) RUS	Aleksei Smetanin	1	0	1	0	0	0	0	0	0	0
	MF	(Russia) RUS	Artyom Yenin	6	0	4	0	1+1	0	0	0	0	0
	MF	(Slovakia) SVK	Marek Hollý	13	0	11	0	0	0	1	0	1	0
	MF	(Turkmenistan) TKM	Dmitri Khomukha	29	7	17+7	7	2+1	0	1	0	0+1	0
	MF	(Ukraine) UKR	Maksym Biletskyi	1	0	1	0	0	0	0	0	0	0
	MF	(Uzbekistan) UZB	Davron Fayziev	8	0	6	0	0	0	1	0	1	0
	FW	(Russia) RUS	Aleksei Bychkov	27	10	8+14	8	1	1	1+1	1	1+1	0
	FW	(Russia) RUS	Ivan Danshin	11	1	0+11	1	0	0	0	0	0	0
	FW	(Russia) RUS	Sergei Kulichenko	3	0	0+3	0	0	0	0	0	0	0
	FW	(Russia) RUS	Vladimir Kulik	34	15	26+1	10	2+1	2	2	3	2	0
Players out on loan:
	MF	(Belarus) BLR	Vadim Skripchenko	9	0	3+4	0	1+1	0	0	0	0	0
Players who left CSKA Moscow during the season:
	GK	(Ukraine) UKR	Ihor Kutepov	6	0	5+1	0	0	0	0	0	0	0
	DF	(Belarus) BLR	Vyacheslav Geraschenko	11	0	8+1	0	1+1	0	0	0	0	0
	DF	(Russia) RUS	Albert Oskolkov	9	0	6+1	0	1+1	0	0	0	0	0

=== Goal scorers ===
Place	Position	Nation	Name	Top Division	1998–99 Russian Cup	1999–2000 Russian Cup	UEFA Cup	Total
1	FW	(Russia)	Vladimir Kulik	10	2	3	0	15
2	FW	(Russia)	Aleksei Bychkov	8	1	1	0	10
3	MF	(Russia)	Sergei Semak	8	1	0	0	9
3	DF	(Russia)	Oleg Kornaukhov	7	0	2	0	9
5	MF	(Russia)	Sergei Filippenkov	3	0	0	0	3
5	DF	(Russia)	Yevgeni Varlamov	2	1	0	0	3
5	MF	(Russia)	Aleksei Savelyev	2	0	1	0	3
8	MF	(Moldova)	Oleg Șișchin	2	0	0	0	2
8	DF	(Russia)	Oleg Kornaukhov	1	1	0	0	2
10	FW	(Russia)	Ivan Danshin	1	0	0	0	1
10	MF	(Russia)	Mikhail Lunin	1	0	0	0	1
			TOTALS	45	6	7	0	58

=== Disciplinary record ===
Nation	Position	Name	Top Division		1998–99 Russian Cup		1999–2000 Russian Cup		UEFA Cup		Total	
Nation	Position	Name	Booked	Sent off (straight red)	Booked	Sent off (straight red)	Booked	Sent off (straight red)	Booked	Sent off (straight red)	Booked	Sent off (straight red)
(Russia)	GK	Yuri Okroshidze	0	1	0	0	0	0	0	0	0	1
(Russia)	DF	Maksim Bokov	8	1	0	1	0	0	0	0	8	2
(Russia)	DF	Rustem Bulatov	4	0	1	0	0	0	0	0	5	0
(Russia)	DF	Oleg Kornaukhov	6	0	1	0	0	0	1	0	8	0
(Russia)	DF	Valeri Minko	2	0	1	0	0	0	1	0	4	0
(Russia)	DF	Andrei Tsaplin	3	0	0	0	0	0	0	0	3	0
(Russia)	DF	Yevgeni Varlamov	4	1	1	0	0	0	0	0	5	1
(Russia)	DF	Denis Yevsikov	1	0	0	0	0	0	0	0	1	0
(Kazakhstan)	MF	Askhat Kadyrkulov	1	0	0	0	0	0	0	0	1	0
(Moldova)	MF	Oleg Șișchin	4	0	1	0	0	0	1	0	6	0
(Russia)	MF	Sergei Filippenkov	5	0	0	0	0	0	0	0	5	0
(Russia)	MF	Sergei Rodin	1	0	0	0	0	0	0	0	1	0
(Russia)	MF	Aleksei Savelyev	2	0	0	0	0	0	0	0	2	0
(Russia)	MF	Sergei Semak	3	0	0	0	0	0	0	0	3	0
(Russia)	MF	Artyom Yenin	1	0	0	0	0	0	0	0	1	0
(Turkmenistan)	MF	Dmitri Khomukha	2	0	1	0	0	0	0	0	3	0
(Uzbekistan)	MF	Davron Fayziev	0	0	0	0	1	0	1	0	2	0
(Russia)	FW	Vladimir Kulik	2	0	0	0	0	0	0	0	2	0
(Russia)	FW	Sergei Kulichenko	1	0	0	0	0	0	0	0	1	0
Players out on loan :
(Belarus)	MF	Vadim Skripchenko	1	0	2	0	0	0	0	0	3	0
Players who left CSKA Moscow during the season:
(Ukraine)	GK	Ihor Kutepov	1	0	0	0	0	0	0	0	1	0
(Belarus)	DF	Vyacheslav Geraschenko	1	0	0	0	0	0	0	0	1	0
(Russia)	DF	Albert Oskolkov	3	1	0	0	0	0	0	0	3	1
		TOTALS	56	4	8	1	1	0	4	0	69	5
