= 2001 PFC CSKA Moscow season =

CSKA
2001 season
- Manager: Pavel Sadyrin (until October); Aleksandr Kuznetsov (caretaker) (from October)
- Stadium: Dynamo Stadium; Eduard Streltsov Stadium
- Top Division: 7th
- Russian Cup: Continued in 2002
- Top goalscorer: League: Predrag Ranđelović (8); All: Predrag Ranđelović (9)

The 2001 CSKA season was the club's tenth season in the Russian Top Division, the highest tier of association football in Russia.

== Squad ==
As of match played 8 November 2001

Number	Name	Nationality	Position	Date of birth (age)	Signed from	Signed in	Contract ends	Apps.	Goals
Goalkeepers
1	Veniamin Mandrykin	(Russia)	GK	30 August 1981 (aged 20)	Alania Vladikavkaz	2001		17	0
Defenders
2	Andrei Solomatin	(Russia)	DF	9 September 1975 (aged 26)	Lokomotiv Moscow	2001		7	0
3	Yevgeni Varlamov	(Russia)	DF	25 July 1975 (aged 26)	KAMAZ	1998		94	11
4	Maksim Bokov	(Russia)	DF	29 August 1973 (aged 28)	Zenit St.Petersburg	1997		133	3
6	Oleg Kornaukhov	(Russia)	DF	14 January 1975 (aged 26)	Shinnik Yaroslavl	1998		121	11
14	Denis Yevsikov	(Russia)	DF	19 February 1981 (aged 20)	Academy	1999		37	0
18	Valeri Minko	(Russia)	DF	8 August 1971 (aged 30)	Dynamo Barnaul	1989		270	12
	Aleksei Berezutski	(Russia)	DF	20 June 1982 (aged 19)	Torpedo-ZIL Moscow	2001		0	0
	Andrei Tsaplin	(Russia)	DF	22 January 1977 (aged 24)	Academy	1996		67	1
	Renat Yanbayev	(Russia)	DF	7 April 1984 (aged 17)	Academy	2001		0	0
Midfielders
5	Sergei Semak	(Russia)	MF	27 February 1976 (aged 25)	Asmaral Moscow	1994		231	57
7	Igor Yanovsky	(Russia)	MF	3 August 1974 (aged 27)	Paris Saint-Germain	2001		14	1
8	Juris Laizāns	(Latvia)	MF	6 January 1979 (aged 22)	Skonto Riga	2001		28	0
11	Sergei Filippenkov	(Russia)	MF	2 August 1971 (aged 30)	CSK VVS-Kristall Smolensk	1998		114	20
12	Vladimir Kuzmichyov	(Russia)	MF	28 July 1979 (aged 22)	Dynamo Kyiv	2001		16	0
15	Davron Fayziev	(Uzbekistan)	MF	16 January 1976 (aged 25)	Sogdiana Jizzakh	2000		25	0
17	Stanislav Lysenko	(Russia)	MF	8 January 1972 (aged 29)	Rubin Kazan	2000		35	5
22	Aleksandr Berketov	(Russia)	MF	24 December 1975 (aged 25)	Rotor Volgograd	2001		10	0
25	Elvir Rahimić	(Bosnia and Herzegovina)	MF	4 April 1976 (aged 25)	Anzhi Makhachkala	2001		14	0
	Sergei Rodin	(Russia)	MF	24 January 1981 (aged 20)	Academy	1999		7	0
Forwards
9	Predrag Ranđelović	(Federal Republic of Yugoslavia)	FW	13 September 1976 (aged 25)	Anzhi Makhachkala	2001		15	9
10	Vladimir Kulik	(Russia)	FW	18 February 1972 (aged 29)	Zenit St.Petersburg	1997		162	63
20	Roman Monaryov	(Ukraine)	FW	17 January 1980 (aged 21)	CSKA Kyiv	2001		11	3
21	Denis Popov	(Russia)	FW	4 February 1979 (aged 22)	Chernomorets Novorossiysk	2001		18	4
Out on loan
22	Aleksei Savelyev	(Russia)	MF	10 April 1977 (aged 24)	Torpedo Moscow	1997		103	7
Left During the Season
2	Andrei Liforenko	(Russia)	DF	14 January 1975 (aged 26)	Dynamo-Stroyimpuls St. Petersburg	2001		1	0
7	Askhat Kadyrkulov	(Kazakhstan)	MF	14 November 1974 (aged 26)	Kairat	2000		13	0
8	Konstantin Kaynov	(Russia)	MF	2 May 1977 (aged 24)	Levski Sofia	2001		5	0
9	Marek Hollý	(Slovakia)	MF	20 August 1973 (aged 28)	Lokomotiv Nizhny Novgorod	2000		40	3
12	Ulugbek Bakayev	(Uzbekistan)	FW	28 November 1978 (aged 22)	Buxoro	2001		7	0
13	Maksym Biletskyi	(Ukraine)	MF	7 January 1980 (aged 21)	Academy	1998		7	0
14	Aleksandr Garin	(Russia)	FW	11 April 1979 (aged 22)	Luch-Energiya Vladivostok	2001		1	0
16	Serhiy Perkhun	(Ukraine)	GK	4 September 1977 (aged 23)	Sheriff Tiraspol	2001		6	0
19	Rustem Bulatov	(Russia)	DF	2 April 1974 (aged 27)	Shinnik Yaroslavl	2000		30	4
20	Mikhail Lunin	(Russia)	MF	31 May 1978 (aged 23)	K.R.C. Harelbeke	2000		20	1
20	Ivan Danshin	(Russia)	FW	20 April 1982 (aged 19)	Academy	2000		12	1
24	Artyom Yenin	(Russia)	MF	6 August 1976 (aged 25)	Shinnik Yaroslavl	2000		14	0
30	Andrei Novosadov	(Russia)	GK	27 March 1972 (aged 29)	KAMAZ	1993		99	0

== Transfers ==
=== Winter ===
In: Note: Flags indicate national team as defined under FIFA eligibility rules; some limited exceptions apply. Players may hold more than one non-FIFA nationality.

No.	Pos.	Nation	Player
1	GK	RUS	Veniamin Mandrykin (from (Russia) Alania Vladikavkaz)
2	DF	RUS	Andrei Liforenko (from (Russia) Dynamo-Stroyimpuls St. Petersburg)
8	MF	RUS	Konstantin Kaynov (from (Bulgaria) Levski Sofia)
8	MF	LAT	Juris Laizāns (from (Latvia) Skonto Riga)
12	FW	UZB	Ulugbek Bakayev (from (Uzbekistan) Buxoro)
14	FW	RUS	Aleksandr Garin (from (Russia) Luch-Energiya Vladivostok)
16	GK	UKR	Serhiy Perkhun (from (Moldova) Sheriff Tiraspol)
21	FW	RUS	Denis Popov (from (Russia) Chernomorets Novorossiysk)

Out: Note: Flags indicate national team as defined under FIFA eligibility rules; some limited exceptions apply. Players may hold more than one non-FIFA nationality.

No.	Pos.	Nation	Player
—	GK	RUS	Vitali Baranov (from (Russia) Khimki)
—	GK	RUS	Yuri Okroshidze (to (Russia) Uralan Elista)
—	DF	BLR	Vadim Skripchenko (to (Russia) Uralan Elista)
—	DF	UKR	Zaur Mamutov (to (Russia) Kuban Krasnodar)
—	MF	MDA	Oleg Șișchin (to (Russia) Saturn Ramenskoye)
—	MF	RUS	Artyom Kovalenko
—	MF	RUS	Aleksandr Shvetsov (to (Russia) Khimki)
—	MF	RUS	Aleksei Smetanin (to (Russia) Terek Grozny)
—	MF	TKM	Dmitri Khomukha (to (Russia) Shinnik Yaroslavl)
—	FW	RUS	Aleksei Bychkov (to (Russia) Shinnik Yaroslavl)
—	FW	RUS	Sergei Kulichenko (to (Russia) Lokomotiv Nizhny Novgorod)
—	FW	RUS	Aleksandr Suchkov (to (Russia) Khimki)

=== Summer ===
In: Note: Flags indicate national team as defined under FIFA eligibility rules; some limited exceptions apply. Players may hold more than one non-FIFA nationality.

No.	Pos.	Nation	Player
2	DF	RUS	Andrei Solomatin (to (Russia) Lokomotiv Moscow)
7	MF	RUS	Igor Yanovsky (from (France) Paris Saint-Germain)
9	FW	YUG	Predrag Ranđelović (from (Russia) Anzhi Makhachkala)
12	MF	RUS	Vladimir Kuzmichyov (from (Ukraine) Dynamo Kyiv)
19	FW	RUS	Spartak Gogniyev (from (Russia) Dynamo Moscow)
20	FW	UKR	Roman Monaryov (from (Ukraine) CSKA Kyiv)
22	MF	RUS	Aleksandr Berketov (from (Russia) Rotor Volgograd)
25	MF	BIH	Elvir Rahimić (from (Russia) Anzhi Makhachkala)
—	DF	RUS	Aleksei Berezutski (from (Russia) Torpedo-ZIL Moscow)

Out: Note: Flags indicate national team as defined under FIFA eligibility rules; some limited exceptions apply. Players may hold more than one non-FIFA nationality.

No.	Pos.	Nation	Player
2	DF	RUS	Andrei Liforenko (to (Russia) Torpedo-ZIL Moscow)
7	MF	KAZ	Askhat Kadyrkulov (to (Kazakhstan) Zhenis Astana)
8	MF	RUS	Konstantin Kaynov (to (Russia) Torpedo-ZIL Moscow)
9	MF	SVK	Marek Hollý (to (Russia) Anzhi Makhachkala)
12	FW	UZB	Ulugbek Bakayev (to (Russia) Torpedo-ZIL Moscow)
13	MF	UKR	Maksym Biletskyi (to (Russia) Torpedo-ZIL Moscow)
14	FW	RUS	Aleksandr Garin (to (Russia) Luch-Energiya Vladivostok)
16	GK	UKR	Serhiy Perkhun (his death)
19	DF	RUS	Rustem Bulatov (to (Russia) Kuban Krasnodar)
20	MF	RUS	Mikhail Lunin (to (Russia) Fakel Voronezh)
20	FW	RUS	Ivan Danshin (to (Russia) Torpedo-ZIL Moscow)
24	MF	RUS	Artyom Yenin (to (Russia) Shinnik Yaroslavl)
30	GK	RUS	Andrei Novosadov (to (Russia) Torpedo-ZIL Moscow)

== Competitions ==
=== Top Division ===
==== Results by round ====
Round	1	2	3	4	5	6	7	8	9	10	11	12	13	14	15	16	17	18	19	20	21	22	23	24	25	26	27	28	29	30
Ground	A	H	A	H	A	H	A	H	A	H	A	H	A	H	H	A	H	A	H	A	H	A	H	A	H	A	H	H	A	A
Result	L	L	L	L	D	W	W	W	W	W	D	D	D	W	W	D	D	W	W	D	D	D	D	L	D	L	W	W	L	W

Updated to match(es) played on 8 November 2001. Source: See Results
A = Away; H = Home; W = Win; D = Draw; L = Loss

==== Results ====
10 March 2001 1	Chernomorets Novorossiysk	2 – 0	CSKA Moscow	Novorossiysk
17:00 MSK (UTC+3)	Snytko 5'; Pryzetko (yellow card) 27' (goal) 36'; Svystunov (yellow card) 86'; Yershov (yellow card) 87'	Report	Minko (yellow card) 80'	Stadium: Central Stadium; Referee: A.Tyumin

17 March 2001 2	CSKA Moscow	0 – 3	Krylia Sovetov	Moscow
18:00 MSK (UTC+3)	Kaynov (yellow card) 16'; Kornaukhov (yellow card) 39'	Report	Tikhonov 14' (yellow card) 78'; Ângelo 47' (yellow card) 75'; Bulatov 52' (o.g.)	Stadium: Dynamo Stadium; Referee: N.Frolov

31 March 2001 3	Spartak Moscow	1 – 0	CSKA Moscow	Moscow
17:00 MSK (UTC+4)	Baranov 33'; Shirko (yellow card) 67'; Kovtun (yellow card) 83'	Report	Filippenkov (yellow card) 29'; Minko (yellow card) 45'; Fayziev (yellow card) 45'; Kaynov (yellow card) 64'	Stadium: Luzhniki Stadium; Referee: A.Butenko

6 April 2001 4	CSKA Moscow	0 – 1	Torpedo Moscow	Moscow
19:00 MSK (UTC+4)	Bakayev (yellow card) 79'	Report	Gashkin 29' (pen.); Kormiltsev (yellow card) 41'; Familtsev (yellow card) 64'; Semshov (yellow card) 90'	Stadium: Dynamo Stadium; Referee: S.Zuev

14 April 2001 5	Rotor Volgograd	1 – 1	CSKA Moscow	Volgograd
17:00 MSK (UTC+4)	Yesipov 3' (pen.)	Report	Biletskyi (yellow card) 13' (yellow-red card) 87'; Savelyev (yellow card) 28'; Borzenkov 37'; Novosadov (yellow card) 70'; Fayziev (yellow card) 85'	Stadium: Central Profsoyuz Stadium; Referee: Yu.Chebotarev

18 April 2001 6	CSKA Moscow	3 – 0	Alania Vladikavkaz	Moscow
19:00 MSK (UTC+4)	Kornaukhov 29' (pen.), 62' (pen.); Popov (yellow card) 39'; Fayziev (yellow card) 49'; Hollý (yellow card) 58'; Lysenko 73'; Savelyev (yellow card) 76'	Report	Botsiyev (yellow card) 17'; Alchagirov (yellow card) 39'	Stadium: Dynamo Stadium; Referee: Yuri Klyuchnikov

28 April 2001 7	Rostselmash	0 – 1	CSKA Moscow	Rostov-on-Don
17:00 MSK (UTC+4)	Adamov (yellow card) 47'; Duyun (yellow card) 34'	Report	Kulik (yellow card) 18'; Savelyev (yellow card) 65'; Semak 71'	Stadium: Olimp-2; Referee: Nikolai Ivanov

6 May 2001 8	CSKA Moscow	1 – 0	Anzhi Makhachkala	Moscow
17:00 MSK (UTC+4)	Yenin (yellow card) 29'; Filippenkov (yellow card) 62'; Popov 89'	Report	Yaskovich (yellow card) 21' (yellow-red card) 59'	Stadium: Dynamo Stadium; Referee: Nikolai Levnikov

13 May 2001 9	Torpedo-ZIL Moscow	0 – 2	CSKA Moscow	Moscow
17:00 MSK (UTC+4)	Borodkin (yellow card) 54'; Ajinjal (yellow card) 69'; Mikalajūnas (yellow card) 74'	Report	Semak 34'; Minko (yellow card) 42'; Yenin (yellow card) 47'; Kulik (yellow card) 76'	Stadium: Eduard Streltsov Stadium; Referee: Aleksandr Kolobaev

20 May 2001 10	CSKA Moscow	2 – 1	Lokomotiv Moscow	Moscow
17:00 MSK (UTC+4)	Semak 14'; Minko (yellow card) 34'; Hollý 75'; Kornaukhov (yellow card) 89'	Report	Loskov 1'; Pimenov (yellow card) 51'; Sarkisyan (red card) 87'	Stadium: Eduard Streltsov Stadium; Referee: A.Kozhukhov

26 May 2001 11	Saturn Ramenskoye	1 – 1	CSKA Moscow	Ramenskoye
18:00 MSK (UTC+4)	Sosnovschi (yellow card) 30'; Movsisyan 64'	Report	Lysenko 75'; Fayziev (yellow card) 80'	Stadium: Saturn Stadium; Referee: Marat Galimov

11 June 2001 12	CSKA Moscow	1 – 1	Zenit St.Petersburg	Moscow
18:00 MSK (UTC+4)	Lysenko 27'; Filippenkov (yellow card) 34'; Minko (yellow card) 80'	Report	Horshkov 17'; Popovych (yellow card) 39'; Spivak (yellow card) 83'	Stadium: Eduard Streltsov Stadium; Referee: Stanislav Sukhina

16 June 2001 13	Fakel Voronezh	1 – 1	CSKA Moscow	Voronezh
18:30 MSK (UTC+4)	Shukanov 25'; Yamlikhanov (yellow card) 51'; Goncharov (yellow card) 90'	Report	Filippenkov 68'; Lysenko (yellow card) 81'	Stadium: Tsentralnyi Profsoyuz Stadion; Referee: Yuri Klyuchnikov

24 June 2001 14	CSKA Moscow	4 – 0	Sokol Saratov	Moscow
18:00 MSK (UTC+4)	Filippenkov 28'; Semak 35'; Minko (yellow card) 36'; Yevsikov (yellow card) 41'; Popov 58' (yellow card) 60'; Kornaukhov 65' (pen.); Bokov (yellow card) 76'	Report	Plotnikov (yellow card) 50'; Orbu (yellow card) 56'	Stadium: Dynamo Stadium; Referee: Taras Bezubyak

30 June 2001 15	CSKA Moscow	2 – 0	Dynamo Moscow	Moscow
19:00 MSK (UTC+4)	Popov 59'; Filippenkov 64' (yellow card) 71'; Lysenko (yellow card) 75'	Report	Šemberas (yellow card) 23'; Žutautas (yellow card) 29'; Gusev (yellow card) 64'	Stadium: Eduard Streltsov Stadium; Referee: Valentin Ivanov

11 July 2001 16	Krylia Sovetov	0 – 0	CSKA Moscow	Samara
18:00 MSK (UTC+4)	Bobyor (yellow card) 45'; Radimov (yellow card) 70'	Report	Minko (yellow card) 48'; Kuzmichyov (yellow card) 60'	Stadium: Metallurg Stadium; Referee: Yu.Chebotarev

18 July 2001 17	CSKA Moscow	1 – 1	Spartak Moscow	Moscow
19:00 MSK (UTC+4)	Solomatin (yellow card) 14'; Laizāns (yellow card) 26' (yellow-red card) 56'; Ranđelović 30'; Kuzmichyov (yellow card) 41'	Report	Beschastnykh 10' (yellow card) 63'; Bulatov (yellow card) 22'; Mitreski (yellow card) 35'; Kovtun (yellow card) 77'	Stadium: Dynamo Stadium; Referee: Yuri Baskakov

22 July 2001 18	Torpedo Moscow	1 – 3	CSKA Moscow	Moscow
19:00 MSK (UTC+4)	Lukhvich (yellow card) 33'; Familtsev (yellow card) 48'; Dayev 72'	Report	Lysenko 35' (yellow card) 83'; Gogniyev (yellow card) 55' (goal) 89', 90'; Kornaukhov (yellow card) 74'	Stadium: Luzhniki Stadium; Referee: Aleksandr Kolobaev

28 July 2001 19	CSKA Moscow	2 – 1	Rotor Volgograd	Moscow
19:00 MSK (UTC+4)	Yanovsky (yellow card) 12'; Ranđelović 28', 45'; Minko (yellow card) 56'	Report	Bondarenko 59'	Stadium: Dynamo Stadium; Referee: Nikolai Ivanov

4 August 2001 20	Alania Vladikavkaz	0 – 0	CSKA Moscow	Vladikavkaz
19:30 MSK (UTC+4)	Paulo Emilio (yellow card) 75'; Dzutsev (yellow card) 85'	Report	Solomatin (yellow card) 61'; Rahimić (yellow card) 65'	Stadium: Republican Spartak Stadium; Referee: Yu.Chebotarev

11 August 2001 21	CSKA Moscow	0 – 0	Rostselmash	Moscow
19:00 MSK (UTC+4)	Popov (yellow card) 19'; Fayziev (yellow card) 90'	Report	Hetman (yellow card) 77'	Stadium: Dynamo Stadium; Referee: I.Yegorov

18 August 2001 22	Anzhi Makhachkala	0 – 0	CSKA Moscow	Makhachkala
17:30 MSK (UTC+4)	Hošić (yellow card) 66'	Report	Solomatin (yellow card) 88'	Stadium: Dynamo Stadium; Referee: A.Evstigneev

24 August 2001 23	CSKA Moscow	1 – 1	Torpedo-ZIL Moscow	Moscow
19:00 MSK (UTC+4)	Solomatin (yellow card) 35'; Berketov (yellow card) 75'; Gogniyev 83'; Yanovsky (yellow card) 89'	Report	Smirnov (yellow card) 25'; Klimov 32'; Liforenko (yellow card) 53'; Litvinov (yellow card) 71'	Stadium: Dynamo Stadium; Referee: Yuri Baskakov

15 September 2001 24	Lokomotiv Moscow	3 – 2	CSKA Moscow	Ramenskoye
19:00 MSK (UTC+4)	Drozdov (yellow card) 30'; Vučićević (yellow card) 36'; Izmailov 56'; Yevsikov 85' (o.g.); Kornaukhov 89' (o.g.)	Report	Yanovsky (yellow card) 6' (yellow-red card) 35'; Ranđelović 10'; Monaryov 22'; Lysenko (yellow card) 47'	Stadium: Saturn Stadium; Referee: S.Zuev

22 September 2001 25	CSKA Moscow	0 – 0	Saturn Ramenskoye	Moscow
19:00 MSK (UTC+4)	Kuzmichyov (yellow card) 45'; Yevsikov (yellow card) 86'	Report	Sosnovschi (yellow card) 23'; Rogaciov (yellow card) 73'; Lyapkin (yellow card) 88'; Rebeja (yellow card) 90'	Stadium: Dynamo Stadium; Referee: Nikolai Levnikov

30 September 2001 26	Zenit St.Petersburg	6 – 1	CSKA Moscow	Saint Petersburg
17:00 MSK (UTC+4)	Ugarov (yellow card) 21'; Demenko 30'; Hovsepyan (yellow card) 35'; Kobelev (yellow card) 45' (goal) 58'; Lepyokhin 53', 56'; Katulsky 54'; Arshavin 80'	Report	Yevsikov (yellow card) 17'; Semak 19'; Kuzmichyov (yellow card) 35'; Rahimić (yellow card) 75'	Stadium: Petrovsky Stadium; Referee: I.Yegorov

9 October 2001 27	CSKA Moscow	5 – 1	Fakel Voronezh	Moscow
19:00 MSK (UTC+4)	Ranđelović 23', 28'; Yanovsky 51'; Laizāns (yellow card) 58'; Gogniyev 54'; Bokov (yellow card) 70' (goal) 75'	Report	Safronov 43'; Shishkin (yellow card) 84'	Stadium: Dynamo Stadium; Referee: Taras Bezubyak

21 October 2001 30	CSKA Moscow	2 – 1	Chernomorets Novorossiysk	Moscow
19:00 MSK (UTC+4)	Ranđelović 42', 52'	Report	Oleinik 44'; Starkov (yellow card) 88'	Stadium: Dynamo Stadium; Referee: Nikolai Ivanov

27 October 2001 29	Dynamo Moscow	3 – 1	CSKA Moscow	Moscow
15:00 MSK (UTC+3)	Bystrov 20' (yellow card) 40'; Šemberas (yellow card) 20' (yellow-red card) 80'; Otyutsky (yellow card) 38'; Tochilin 53'; Dyatel 58' (yellow card) 69'	Report	Gogniyev 74'	Stadium: Dynamo Stadium; Referee: Aleksandr Kolobaev

8 November 2001 28	Sokol Saratov	0 – 2	CSKA Moscow	Saratov
18:00 MSK (UTC+3)	Nizovtsev (yellow card) 70'	Report	Lysenko 34'; Mandrykin (yellow card) 82'; Kulik 87'	Stadium: Lokomotiv Stadium; Referee: I.Yegorov

==== Table ====
Pos	Team	Pld	W	D	L	GF	GA	GD	Pts	Qualification or relegation
5	Krylia Sovetov Samara	30	14	7	9	38	23	+15	49	Qualification to Intertoto Cup second round
6	Saturn	30	13	8	9	45	22	+23	47	
7	CSKA Moscow	30	12	11	7	39	30	+9	47	Qualification to UEFA Cup first round
8	Sokol Saratov	30	12	5	13	31	42	−11	41	
9	Dynamo Moscow	30	10	8	12	43	51	−8	38	

Source: rsssf.com
Rules for classification: 1) points; 2) goal difference; 3) number of goals scored.

=== Russian Cup ===
==== 2001-02 ====
9 September 2001 Round of 32	Mordovia Saransk	0 – 2	CSKA Moscow	Saransk
16:00 MSK (UTC+4)	E.Likhomanov (yellow card) 80'	Report	Gogniyev (yellow card) 27'; Ranđelović 53' (yellow card) 59'; Monaryov 82'	Stadium: Start Stadium; Referee: Nikolai Ivanov

16 October 2001 Round of 16	CSKA Moscow	2 – 1	Rubin Kazan	Moscow
19:00 MSK (UTC+4)	Kulik 16'; Monaryov 30'	Report	Sharonov (yellow card) 15'; Semyonov (yellow card) 17'; Boyarintsev 44' (yellow card) 78'; Filippov (yellow card) 66'; Sokolov (yellow card) 84'	Stadium: Eduard Streltsov Stadium; Referee: Yu.Chebotarev

Quarterfinal took place during the 2002 season.

== Squad statistics ==
As of match played 8 November 2001

=== Appearances and goals ===
No.	Pos	Nat	Player	Total		Top Division		2001–02 Russian Cup	
No.	Pos	Nat	Player	Apps	Goals	Apps	Goals	Apps	Goals
1	GK	(Russia) RUS	Veniamin Mandrykin	17	0	15	0	2	0
2	DF	(Russia) RUS	Andrei Solomatin	7	0	7	0	0	0
3	DF	(Russia) RUS	Yevgeni Varlamov	3	0	3	0	0	0
4	DF	(Russia) RUS	Maksim Bokov	8	1	4+4	1	0	0
5	MF	(Russia) RUS	Sergei Semak	26	5	26	5	0	0
6	DF	(Russia) RUS	Oleg Kornaukhov	26	3	24+1	3	1	0
7	MF	(Russia) RUS	Igor Yanovsky	14	1	12	1	1+1	0
8	MF	(Latvia) LAT	Juris Laizāns	28	0	25+1	0	2	0
9	FW	(Federal Republic of Yugoslavia) YUG	Predrag Ranđelović	15	9	13	8	2	1
10	FW	(Russia) RUS	Vladimir Kulik	26	2	21+3	1	2	1
11	MF	(Russia) RUS	Sergei Filippenkov	21	3	11+8	3	2	0
12	MF	(Russia) RUS	Vladimir Kuzmichyov	16	0	11+3	0	0+2	0
14	DF	(Russia) RUS	Denis Yevsikov	22	0	18+2	0	2	0
15	MF	(Uzbekistan) UZB	Davron Fayziev	17	0	15+2	0	0	0
17	MF	(Russia) RUS	Stanislav Lysenko	27	5	22+3	5	2	0
18	DF	(Russia) RUS	Valeri Minko	17	0	11+5	0	1	0
19	FW	(Russia) RUS	Spartak Gogniyev	16	5	4+10	5	1+1	0
20	FW	(Ukraine) UKR	Roman Monaryov	11	3	5+4	1	1+1	2
21	FW	(Russia) RUS	Denis Popov	18	4	15+3	4	0	0
22	MF	(Russia) RUS	Aleksandr Berketov	10	0	7+2	0	1	0
25	MF	(Bosnia and Herzegovina) BIH	Elvir Rahimić	14	0	12	0	2	0
Players out on loan:
22	MF	(Russia) RUS	Aleksei Savelyev	15	0	7+8	0	0	0
Players who left CSKA Moscow during the season:
2	DF	(Russia) RUS	Andrei Liforenko	1	0	1	0	0	0
7	MF	(Kazakhstan) KAZ	Askhat Kadyrkulov	2	0	0+2	0	0	0
8	MF	(Russia) RUS	Konstantin Kaynov	5	0	5	0	0	0
9	MF	(Slovakia) SVK	Marek Hollý	9	1	9	1	0	0
12	FW	(Uzbekistan) UZB	Ulugbek Bakayev	7	0	3+4	0	0	0
13	MF	(Ukraine) UKR	Maksym Biletskyi	6	0	4+2	0	0	0
14	FW	(Russia) RUS	Aleksandr Garin	1	0	0+1	0	0	0
16	GK	(Ukraine) UKR	Serhiy Perkhun	6	0	6	0	0	0
19	DF	(Russia) RUS	Rustem Bulatov	3	0	2+1	0	0	0
20	MF	(Russia) RUS	Mikhail Lunin	6	0	2+4	0	0	0
20	FW	(Russia) RUS	Ivan Danshin	1	0	0+1	0	0	0
24	MF	(Russia) RUS	Artyom Yenin	8	0	5+3	0	0	0
30	GK	(Russia) RUS	Andrei Novosadov	9	0	9	0	0	0

=== Goal scorers ===
Place	Position	Nation	Number	Name	Top Division	2001–02 Russian Cup	Total
1	FW	(Federal Republic of Yugoslavia)	9	Predrag Ranđelović	8	1	9
2	MF	(Russia)	17	Stanislav Lysenko	5	0	5
2	MF	(Russia)	5	Sergei Semak	5	0	5
2	FW	(Russia)	19	Spartak Gogniyev	5	0	5
5	FW	(Russia)	21	Denis Popov	4	0	4
6	DF	(Russia)	6	Oleg Kornaukhov	3	0	3
6	MF	(Russia)	11	Sergei Filippenkov	3	0	3
6	FW	(Ukraine)	20	Roman Monaryov	1	2	3
9	FW	(Russia)	10	Vladimir Kulik	1	1	2
10	DF	(Russia)	4	Maksim Bokov	1	0	1
10	MF	(Slovakia)	9	Marek Hollý	1	0	1
10	MF	(Russia)	7	Igor Yanovsky	1	0	1
10				Own goal	1	0	1
				TOTALS	39	4	43

=== Disciplinary record ===
Number	Nation	Position	Name	Top Division		2001–02 Russian Cup		Total	
Number	Nation	Position	Name	Booked	Sent off (straight red)	Booked	Sent off (straight red)	Booked	Sent off (straight red)
1	(Russia)	GK	Veniamin Mandrykin	1	0	0	0	1	0
2	(Russia)	DF	Andrei Solomatin	4	0	0	0	4	0
3	(Russia)	DF	Yevgeni Varlamov	1	0	0	0	1	0
4	(Russia)	DF	Maksim Bokov	2	0	0	0	2	0
6	(Russia)	DF	Oleg Kornaukhov	2	0	0	0	2	0
7	(Russia)	MF	Igor Yanovsky	4	1	0	0	4	1
8	(Latvia)	MF	Juris Laizāns	3	1	0	0	3	1
9	(Federal Republic of Yugoslavia)	FW	Predrag Ranđelović	0	0	1	0	1	0
10	(Russia)	FW	Vladimir Kulik	2	0	0	0	2	0
11	(Russia)	MF	Sergei Filippenkov	4	0	0	0	4	0
12	(Russia)	MF	Vladimir Kuzmichyov	4	0	0	0	4	0
14	(Russia)	DF	Denis Yevsikov	3	0	0	0	3	0
15	(Uzbekistan)	MF	Davron Fayziev	5	0	0	0	5	0
17	(Russia)	MF	Stanislav Lysenko	4	0	0	0	4	0
18	(Russia)	DF	Valeri Minko	8	0	0	0	8	0
19	(Russia)	FW	Spartak Gogniyev	1	0	1	0	2	0
21	(Russia)	FW	Denis Popov	3	0	0	0	3	0
22	(Russia)	MF	Aleksandr Berketov	1	0	0	0	1	0
25	(Bosnia and Herzegovina)	MF	Elvir Rahimić	2	0	0	0	2	0
Players out on loan :
22	(Russia)	MF	Aleksei Savelyev	3	0	0	0	3	0
Players who left CSKA Moscow during the season:
8	(Russia)	MF	Konstantin Kaynov	2	0	0	0	2	0
9	(Slovakia)	MF	Marek Hollý	1	0	0	0	1	0
12	(Uzbekistan)	FW	Ulugbek Bakayev	1	0	0	0	1	0
13	(Ukraine)	MF	Maksym Biletskyi	2	1	0	0	2	1
24	(Russia)	MF	Artyom Yenin	2	0	0	0	2	0
30	(Russia)	GK	Andrei Novosadov	1	0	0	0	1	0
			TOTALS	66	3	2	0	68	3
