= 1994–95 Belarusian Cup =

Tournament details
- Country: Belarus
- Teams: 41

Final positions
- Champions: Dinamo-93 Minsk (1st title)
- Runners-up: Torpedo Mogilev

Tournament statistics
- Matches played: 40
- Goals scored: 112 (2.8 per match)
- Top goal scorer(s): Uladzimir Skarabahaty (4 goals)

The 1994–95 Belarusian Cup was the fourth season of the annual Belarusian football cup competition.

Contrary to the league season, it was conducted in a fall-spring rhythm. It began on 3 August 1994 with the preliminary round and ended on 28 June 1995 with the final at the Dinamo Stadium in Minsk.

FC Dinamo Minsk were the defending champions, having defeated FC Fandok Bobruisk in the 1994 final, but were knocked out in the third round by FC Molodechno.

FC Dinamo-93 Minsk won the final against FC Torpedo Mogilev after the penalty shootout to win their first title.

== Preliminary round ==
The games were played on 3 August 1994.

Team 1	Score	Team 2
Torpedo Zhodino (II)	3–2	Legmash Orsha (III)
Dnepr Rogachev (III)	0–1	Fomalgaut Borisov (III)
Khimik Svetlogorsk (II)	3–1	ZLiN Gomel (II)
KPF Slonim (II)	1–3	Santanas Samokhvalovichi (II)
Stroitel Bereza (III)	5–2 (a.e.t.)	Avtoprovod Shchuchyn (III)
Kommunalnik Pinsk (II)	3–1	Biolog Novopolotsk (III)
Naftan Novopolotsk (III)	1–0	Transmash Mogilev (II)
Zaria Iazyl (III)	0–1	Metapol Baranovichi (III)
Kardan-Flyers Grodno (II)	2–3	Polesye Mozyr (II)

== Round of 32 ==
The games were played on 31 August 1994.

Team 1	Score	Team 2
Brestbytkhim Brest (II)	0–1 (a.e.t.)	Dnepr Mogilev
Ataka-Aura Minsk (II)	0–3	Molodechno
Polesye Mozyr (II)	5–1	Shakhtyor Soligorsk
Metapol Baranovichi (III)	1–3	Lokomotiv Vitebsk
Khimik Svetlogorsk (II)	2–3	Vedrich Rechitsa
Fomalgaut Borisov (III)	1–0	KIM Vitebsk
Dinamo-Juni Minsk (III)	2–4	Dinamo Minsk
Khimvolokno Grodno (II)	0–3	Torpedo Mogilev
Stroitel Starye Dorogi (II)	2–0	Fandok Bobruisk
Fandok-2 Bobruisk (III)	0–5	Shinnik Bobruisk
Kommunalnik Pinsk (II)	0–1	Dinamo Brest
Torpedo Zhodino (II)	1–2	Dinamo-93 Minsk
Derevoobrabotchik Mosty (III)	1–2	Obuvshchik Lida
Santanas Samokhvalovichi (II)	1–3	Neman Grodno
Naftan Novopolotsk (III)	5–1	Gomselmash Gomel
Stroitel Bereza (III)	1–1 (a.e.t.) (1–4 p)	Torpedo Minsk

== Round of 16 ==
The games were played on 21 September 1994.

Team 1	Score	Team 2
Lokomotiv Vitebsk	0–1	Dinamo-93 Minsk
Molodechno	1–0	Dinamo Minsk
Dinamo Brest	0–1 (a.e.t.)	Torpedo Mogilev
Obuvshchik Lida	0–1	Stroitel Starye Dorogi (II)
Dnepr Mogilev	1–0	Neman Grodno
Vedrich Rechitsa	2–1 (a.e.t.)	Fomalgaut Borisov (III)
Torpedo Minsk	0–2	Polesye Mozyr (II)
Shinnik Bobruisk	1–0	Naftan Novopolotsk (III)

== Quarterfinals ==
The games were played on 4 and 5 October 1994.

Team 1	Score	Team 2
Torpedo Mogilev	2–1	Polesye Mozyr (II)
Dnepr Mogilev	2–0	Molodechno
Dinamo-93 Minsk	1–0	Stroitel Starye Dorogi (II)
Vedrich Rechitsa (II)	0–0 (a.e.t.) (1–4 p)	Shinnik Bobruisk

== Semifinals ==
The games were played on 26 October 1994.

Team 1	Score	Team 2
Dinamo-93 Minsk	1–1 (a.e.t.) (6–5 p)	Dnepr Mogilev
Torpedo Mogilev	4–0	Shinnik Bobruisk

== Final ==
The final match was played on 28 June 1995 at the Dinamo Stadium in Minsk.

28 June 1995
18:00 UTC+3

Dinamo-93 Minsk	1–1 (a.e.t.)	Torpedo Mogilev
Downar 76'	Report	Kuzmenok 39'
Penalties
Vyarheychyk (penalty scored); Shilo (penalty scored); Lavrik (penalty scored); Skripchenko (penalty missed); Shavrov (penalty missed); Turchinovich (penalty scored); Downar (penalty scored); Tarlowski (penalty scored); Pavlyuchuk (penalty scored)	7–6	(penalty scored) Golovin; (penalty scored) Prykhodko; (penalty missed) Ryabokon; (penalty missed) Savelyev; (penalty scored) Migursky; (penalty scored) Geraschenko; (penalty scored) Sednev; (penalty scored) Kuzmenok; (penalty missed) Pinchuk

Dinamo Stadium, Minsk
Attendance: 2,500
Referee: Vadim Zhuk (Minsk)

Dinamo-93 Minsk	Torpedo Mogilev

DINAMO-93:
GK	1	(Belarus) Aleksandr Yevnevich
DF	2	(Belarus) Vadim Artamonov		(substituted off) 46'
DF	3	(Belarus) Andrei Lavrik
DF	4	(Belarus) Sergey Pavlyuchuk	(yellow card) 65'
DF	7	(Belarus) Ihar Tarlowski
MF	5	(Belarus) Andrey Downar	(yellow card) 44'
MF	6	(Belarus) Yury Vyarheychyk
MF	8	(Belarus) Fedor Sikorsky		(substituted off) 67'
MF	9	(Belarus) Vadim Skripchenko
FW	10	(Belarus) Pavel Shavrov	(yellow card) 112'
FW	11	(Belarus) Andrey Lobanov		(substituted off) 91'
Substitutes:
GK	12	(Belarus) Vladimir Yurkevich
MF	13	(Belarus) Andrei Shilo		(substituted on) 91'
MF	14	(Belarus) Oleg Avgul
DF	15	(Belarus) Vadzim Lasowski
FW	16	(Belarus) Sergey Shushkevich
FW	17	(Belarus) Dmitry Bespansky		(substituted on) 46'
FW	18	(Belarus) Andrey Turchinovich		(substituted on) 67'
Manager:
(Belarus) Viktor Sokol

TORPEDO:
GK	1	(Ukraine) Andriy Huz		(substituted off) 118'
DF	2	(Belarus) Aleksandr Sednev
DF	3	(Ukraine) Viktor Pinchuk
DF	4	(Ukraine) Oleksandr Prykhodko
DF	5	(Ukraine) Oleksandr Ryabokon
MF	6	(Russia) Dmitri Golovin	(yellow card) 84'
MF	8	(Belarus) Vladimir Migursky
MF	9	(Belarus) Sergey Teplyakov		(substituted off) 77'
MF	10	(Belarus) Vyacheslav Geraschenko
FW	7	(Ukraine) Viktor Rudyi		(substituted off) 79'
FW	10	(Belarus) Oleg Kuzmenok
Substitutes:
MF	12	(Ukraine) Ihor Savelyev		(substituted on) 77'
FW	13	(Russia) Yevgeni Tsarkov
DF	14	(Belarus) Dmitri Borozna
DF	15	(Belarus) Sergey Omelyusik		(substituted on) 79'
GK	16	(Belarus) Sergey Sinitsyn		(substituted on) 118'
FW	17	(Belarus) Sergey Volkovich
Manager:
(Belarus) Mikhail Bass
