= Lunin =

Lunin (Russian: Лунин) is a Russian masculine surname, its feminine counterpart is Lunina. It may refer to:

== Aristocratic family ==
- House of Lunin, a Russian aristocratic family of Polish origin
- Michael Lunin (1787–1845), Russian political philosopher and revolutionary, a member of House Lunin

== Other people ==
- Alexander Lunin or Alexandr Lunin (born 1996 or earlier), Russian military veterane (frontier soldier in Ukrainian War), blogger about the Russian-Ukrainian war, in a video of 2026-06-25 he speaks about torture and corruption in the Russian army and wants to confront Putin
- Andriy Lunin (born 1999), Ukrainian football player
- Anton Lunin (born 1986), Russian football player
- Mikhail Lunin (footballer) (born 1978), Russian football coach and former player
- Nikolai Lunin (1907–1970), Soviet Admiral
- Stanislav Lunin (1993–2021), Kazakhstani football player
- Zinaida Lunina (born 1989), Belarusian gymnast
