= Giorgi Ladaria =

Abkhazian footballer

Personal information
- Date of birth: 9 September 1979 (age 47)
- Height: 1.84 m (6 ft 0 in)
- Position: Forward

Senior career*
Years	Team	Apps	(Gls)
1996	FC Chernomorets Novorossiysk	1	(0)
1997–1999	FC Obolon-PPO Kyiv	8	(0)
1999–2000	FC Kolkheti Khobi	3	(0)
2000	FC Fabus Bronnitsy	3	(0)
- * Club domestic league appearances and goals

Giorgi Ladaria (Russian: Георгий Владимирович Ладария; born 9 September 1979) is a retired Abkhazian professional football player. He also holds Russian citizenship.

Ladaria made a single appearance in the Russian Premier League with FC Chernomorets Novorossiysk.
