= 1998–99 Slovak Cup =

Tournament details
- Country: Slovakia
- Teams: 42

Final positions
- Champions: Slovan Bratislava
- Runners-up: Dukla Banská Bystrica

The 1998–99 Slovak Cup was the 30th season of Slovakia's annual knock-out cup competition and the sixth since the independence of Slovakia. It began on 29 July 1998 with the matches of preliminary round and ended on 8 May 1999 with the final. The winners of the competition earned a place in the first round of the UEFA Cup. Spartak Trnava were the defending champions.

== Preliminary round ==
The first legs were played on 29 July 1998. The second legs were played on 12 August 1998.

Team 1	Agg.	Team 2	1st leg	2nd leg
Spartak Myjava	3–1	Slovan Bratislava B	1–0	2–1
Nové Zámky	1–2	Slovan Levice	1–1	0–1
Koba Senec	7–0	Slovan Duslo Šaľa	6–0	1–0
Zemplín Michalovce	2–0	Mineral Dubová	2–0	0–0
Železiarne Podbrezová	2–3	Bukocel Vranov nad Topľou	1–0	1–3
Slavoj Trebišov	1–2	Tatran Liptovský Mikuláš	1–1	0–1

== First round ==
The games were played on 8 September 1998, except for the match ŠKP Devín – Artmedia Petržalka, which was played on 9 September 1998.

Team 1	Score	Team 2
DAC Dunajská Streda	1–1 (6–5 p)	Ozeta Dukla Trenčín
PFK Piešťany	1–5	Slovan Bratislava
NCHZ Nováky	0–3	Spartak Trnava
Matador Púchov	1–1 (3–4 p)	Kerametal Dubnica nad Váhom
Koba Senec	1–2	Baník Prievidza
Spartak Myjava	0–7	Inter Bratislava
Slovan Duslo Šaľa	1–1 (6–7 p)	FC Nitra
Zemplín Michalovce	1–7	Tatran Prešov
Tatran Liptovský Mikuláš	0–1	Dukla Banská Bystrica
Tesla Stropkov	1–1 (4–5 p)	Tauris Rimavská Sobota
Bukocel Vranov nad Topľou	2–3	HFC Humenné
Slovan Levice	0–1	MŠK Žilina
Slovmag Jelšava	2–2 (1–3 p)	BSC JAS Bardejov
Lokomotíva Košice	1–5	1. FC Košice
Steel Trans Ličartovce	1–4	SCP Ružomberok
ŠKP Devín	1–1 (4–3 p)	Artmedia Petržalka

== Second round ==
The games were played on 22 September 1998, except for the match Spartak Trnava – Baník Prievidza, which was played on 23 September 1998.

Team 1	Score	Team 2
BSC JAS Bardejov	4–3	Tatran Prešov
MŠK Žilina	1–2	Inter Bratislava
Slovan Bratislava	3–0	HFC Humenné
Kerametal Dubnica nad Váhom	4–1	DAC Dunajská Streda
Tauris Rimavská Sobota	2–0	1. FC Košice
Dukla Banská Bystrica	5–1	FC Nitra
ŠKP Devín	2–2 (4–5 p)	SCP Ružomberok
Spartak Trnava	4–0	Baník Prievidza

== Quarter-finals ==
The games were played on 27 October 1998.

27 October 1998	Slovan Bratislava	1–0	Tauris Rimavská Sobota	Bratislava
	Hrnčár 58' (pen.)	Report		Stadium: Tehelné pole Attendance: 1,300; Referee: Jaroslav Jekkel

27 October 1998	Inter Bratislava	0–0 (3–4 p)	Spartak Trnava	Bratislava
		Report		Stadium: Štadión Pasienky; Attendance: 2,200; Referee: Bohdan Benedik

27 October 1998	Dukla Banská Bystrica	1–0	SCP Ružomberok	Banská Bystrica
	Rusnák 13'	Report		Stadium: Štadión SNP Štiavničky; Attendance: 800; Referee: Anton Stredák

27 October 1998	BSC JAS Bardejov	0–1	Kerametal Dubnica nad Váhom	Bardejov
		Report	Krajčovič 27'	Stadium: Mestský štadión Bardejov; Attendance: 700; Referee: Artúr Jakubec

== Semi-finals ==
The first legs were played on 16 March 1999. The second legs were played on 6 April 1999.

=== First legs ===
16 March 1999	Kerametal Dubnica nad Váhom	3–2	Dukla Banská Bystrica	Dubnica nad Váhom
	Kentoš 12' (o.g.); Polách 6'; Nemečkay 74'	Report	Faktor 24' (pen.); Boháčík 60'	Stadium: Štadión Zimný; Attendance: 800; Referee: Artúr Jakubec

16 March 1999	Slovan Bratislava	1–1	Spartak Trnava	Bratislava
	Borysenko 72'	Report	Gomes 70'	Stadium: Tehelné pole Attendance: 6,500; Referee: Milan Bezák

=== Second legs ===
6 April 1999	Dukla Banská Bystrica	2–1 (4a–4 agg.)	Kerametal Dubnica nad Váhom	Banská Bystrica
	Faktor 45' (pen.), 63' (pen.)	Report	Bari 36'	Stadium: Štadión SNP Štiavničky; Attendance: 1,398; Referee: Anton Stredák

6 April 1999	Spartak Trnava	1–2 (2–3 agg.)	Slovan Bratislava	Trnava
	Gomes 22'	Report	Jančula 34', 36'	Stadium: Anton Malatinský Stadium; Attendance: 7,541; Referee: Jaroslav Jekkel

== Final ==
8 May 1999
17:00 CEST

Slovan Bratislava	3–0	Dukla Banská Bystrica
Kriss 43'; Meszároš 63', 73'	Report

Mestský štadión, Žiar nad Hronom
Attendance: 10,048
Referee: Ľuboš Micheľ
