= Sergei Puponov =

Russian footballer

Personal information
- Full name: Sergei Fyodorovich Puponov
- Date of birth: 8 April 1982 (age 44)
- Height: 1.85 m (6 ft 1 in)
- Position: Midfielder

Youth career
- RUOR Bronnitsy

Senior career*
Years	Team	Apps	(Gls)
1998–1999	FC Fabus Bronnitsy	33	(2)
1999	FC Bronnitsy		
2000	FC Saturn Ramenskoye	1	(0)
2000	→ FC Saturn-d Ramenskoye (loan)	12	(1)
2000–2002	FC Fabus Bronnitsy	70	(8)
2003	FC Fabus Bronnitsy (amateur)		
2004	FC Balashikha		
2006–2008	FC Bronnitsy		
- * Club domestic league appearances and goals

Sergei Fyodorovich Puponov (Russian: Сергей Фёдорович Пупонов; born 8 April 1982) is a former Russian football player.

Puponov made a single appearance in the Russian Premier League with FC Saturn Ramenskoye.
