= Athletics at the 1983 Summer Universiade – Men's long jump =

The men's long jump event at the 1983 Summer Universiade was held at the Commonwealth Stadium in Edmonton, Canada on 6 and 7 July 1983.

== Medalists ==
Gold	Silver	Bronze
Yusuf Alli; Nigeria	Ralph Spry; United States	Sergey Rodin; Soviet Union

== Results ==
=== Qualification ===
Rank	Athlete	Nationality	Result	Notes
1	Yusuf Alli	Nigeria	7.78	
2	Ralph Spry	United States	7.71	
3	Fabrizio Sacchi	Italy	7.70	
4	Marco Piochi	Italy	7.69	
5	Sergey Rodin	Soviet Union	7.68	
6	Veryl Switzer	United States	7.67	
6	Kim Jong-il	South Korea	7.67	
8	Dimitrios Delifotis	Greece	7.47	
9	Ian James	Canada	7.34	
10	Michel Boutet	Canada	7.27	
11	Ibrahima Cissé	Senegal	7.25	
12	Abdenour Krim	Algeria	7.07	
13	Gabi Issa El Khury	Lebanon	6.93	
	Konstantin Semykin	Soviet Union	NM	

=== Final ===
Rank	Athlete	Nationality	Result	Notes
1st place, gold medalist(s)	Yusuf Alli	Nigeria	8.21	
2nd place, silver medalist(s)	Ralph Spry	United States	7.91	
3rd place, bronze medalist(s)	Sergey Rodin	Soviet Union	7.85	
4	Fabrizio Sacchi	Italy	7.82	
5	Veryl Switzer	United States	7.79	
6	Marco Piochi	Italy	7.77	
7	Ian James	Canada	7.72	
8	Kim Jong-il	South Korea	7.62	
9	Michel Boutet	Canada	7.28	
10	Dimitrios Delifotis	Greece	7.27	
11	Ibrahima Cissé	Senegal	7.24	
12	Abdenour Krim	Algeria	6.99	
