= Alpatov =

Alpatov (Russian: Алпатов) is a Russian masculine surname, its feminine counterpart is Alpatova. It may refer to

- Mikhail Alpatov (1902–1986), Soviet historian and art theorist
- Vadym Alpatov (born 1980), Ukrainian football player
- Vladimir Alpatov (born 1945), Soviet and Russian linguist
