= Sergei Kaputin =

Russian footballer

Personal information
- Full name: Sergei Alekseyevich Kaputin
- Date of birth: 22 August 1983 (age 43)
- Height: 1.83 m (6 ft 0 in)
- Positions: Defender; midfielder

Senior career*
Years	Team	Apps	(Gls)
2001–2002	FC Fabus Bronnitsy	66	(1)
2003–2004	FC Tobol	36	(1)
2006–2007	FC Neftekhimik Nizhnekamsk	36	(3)
2007–2008	FC Kairat	31	(1)
- * Club domestic league appearances and goals

Sergei Alekseyevich Kaputin (Russian: Серге́й Алексеевич Капутин; born 22 August 1983) is a former Russian professional footballer.

== Club career ==
Kaputin played in the Kazakhstan Premier League with FC Tobol and FC Kairat.

== Honours ==
- Kazakhstan Premier League runner-up: 2003.
