= Smetanin =

Smetanin (masculine, Russian: Сметанин) or Smetanina (feminine, Russian: Сметанина) is a Russian surname. Notable people with the surname include:

- Aleksei Smetanin (born 1981), Russian soccer player
- Andrei Smetanin (born 1969), Russian soccer coach and former player
- Herman Smetanin (born 1992), Ukrainian politician and defense industry management executive
- Maxim Smetanin (born 1974), Kyrgyz triple jumper
- Vladimir Smetanin (born 1937), Russian weightlifter
- Raisa Smetanina (born 1952), Russian cross-country skier

== See also ==
- Smetana
