= Andrey Shilo =

Belarusian footballer

Personal information
- Full name: Andrey Timofeyevich Shilo
- Date of birth: 11 July 1976 (age 50)
- Place of birth: Minsk, Belarusian SSR
- Height: 1.82 m (6 ft 0 in)
- Positions: Defender; midfielder

Youth career
- 1992–1993: Smena Minsk

Senior career*
Years	Team	Apps	(Gls)
1993–1996	Dinamo-93 Minsk	68	(1)
1997–1999	Dinamo Minsk	55	(1)
2000–2001	Žalgiris Vilnius	37	(4)
2001–2002	Farum	4	(0)
2003	Žalgiris Vilnius	22	(5)
2004	Podbeskidzie Bielsko-Biała	15	(1)
2004–2005	Žalgiris Vilnius	48	(0)
2006	Veras Nesvizh	23	(0)
2007	Smorgon	18	(0)
2008	Veras Nesvizh	20	(1)
2009	Baranovichi	9	(0)
2009	Gorodeya	10	(2)
2010	Smorgon	20	(0)
Total		349	(15)

International career
1993–1994	Belarus U18	6	(0)
1996–1997	Belarus U21	12	(0)
- * Club domestic league appearances and goals

Andrey Timofeyevich Shilo (Belarusian: Андрэй Шыла, Russian: Андрей Шило; born 11 July 1976) is a Belarusian former professional footballer.

== Career ==
In the 1993–94 season, Shilo was the youngest member of the Dinamo-93 Minsk first team and helped Belarus qualify for that year's UEFA European Under-18 Championship.

For 2000, he signed for Žalgiris in Lithuania which was perceived as a step back in his career. By age 26, he was playing in the Danish second division with Farum.

== Honours ==
Dinamo-93 Minsk

- Belarusian Cup: 1994–95

Dinamo Minsk

- Belarusian Premier League: 1997

Žalgiris Vilnius

- Lithuanian Football Cup: 2003
