= Andrei Lavrik =

Belarusian footballer (born 1974)

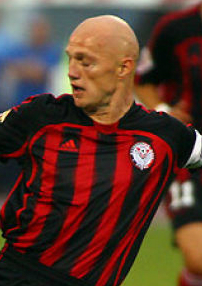
- Lavrik with Amkar Perm

Personal information
- Full name: Andrey Ivanavich Lavrik
- Date of birth: 7 December 1974 (age 51)
- Place of birth: Soviet Union
- Height: 1.77 m (5 ft 10 in)
- Position: Defender

Youth career
- Dinamo Minsk

Senior career*
Years	Team	Apps	(Gls)
1992–1995	Dinamo-93 Minsk	94	(1)
1996–1997	Dinamo Minsk	51	(9)
1998–2001	Lokomotiv Moscow	86	(1)
2002–2003	Dinamo-SPb St. Petersburg	64	(10)
2004–2007	Amkar Perm	89	(4)
2008	Torpedo Moscow	5	(0)
2008–2009	Aktobe	37	(2)
2010	Baltika Kaliningrad	3	(0)
2010	Torpedo Zhodino	16	(2)
Total		445	(29)

International career
1992–1995	Belarus U21	5	(1)
1997–2005	Belarus	37	(1)

Managerial career
- 2011–2012: Torpedo-BelAZ Zhodino (assistant)
- 2014: Partizan Minsk
- 2015: Bereza-2010
- 2017–2018: Dinamo Minsk (sporting director)
- 2018–2019: Dinamo Brest (scout)
- 2020–2023: Dinamo Minsk (sporting director)
- * Club domestic league appearances and goals

Andrei Ivanavich Lavrik (Belarusian: Андрэй Лаўрык; Russian: Андрей Лаврик; born 7 December 1974) is a Belarusian football official, coach and a former player.

== Career statistics ==
#	Date	Venue	Opponent	Score	Result	Competition
1	9 February 2005	Dyskobolia Stadium, Grodzisk Wielkopolski, Poland	Poland	3 – 1	3–1	Friendly

== Honours ==
Dinamo-93 Minsk

- Belarusian Cup: 1994–95

Dinamo Minsk

- Belarusian Premier League: 1997

Lokomotiv Moscow

- Russian Cup: 1999–2000, 2000–01

Aktobe

- Kazakhstan Premier League: 2008, 2009
- Kazakhstan Cup: 2008
