= Konstantin Kaynov =

Russian footballer and official

Personal information
- Full name: Konstantin Nikolayevich Kaynov
- Date of birth: 2 May 1977 (age 49)
- Place of birth: Gorky, Russian SFSR
- Height: 1.75 m (5 ft 9 in)
- Position: Midfielder

Team information
- Current team: FC Chayka Peschanokopskoye (director)

Youth career
- PFC CSKA Moscow

Senior career*
Years	Team	Apps	(Gls)
1995–1999	FC Fabus Bronnitsy	150	(48)
1999–2000	FC Krylia Sovetov Samara	25	(6)
2000–2001	PFC Levski Sofia	2	(0)
2001	PFC CSKA Moscow	5	(0)
2001	FC Torpedo-ZIL Moscow	3	(1)
2002	FC Khimki	17	(0)
2003–2004	FC Oryol	16	(2)
2004–2007	FC Lada Togliatti	110	(19)
2007	FC Volga Nizhny Novgorod	13	(7)
2008–2009	FC Lada Togliatti	59	(10)
2010	FC Gornyak Uchaly	23	(1)
2011–2012	FC Saturn-2 Moscow Oblast	40	(10)
2012–2013	FC Lada-Togliatti Togliatti	27	(2)
2013–2014	FC Kolomna	20	(1)
2014	FC StArs Kolomensky Rayon		
2016	FC Bronnitsy		

Managerial career
- 2016–: FC Chayka Peschanokopskoye (director)
- * Club domestic league appearances and goals

Konstantin Nikolayevich Kaynov (Russian: Константин Николаевич Кайнов; born 2 May 1977) is a Russian professional football official and a former player. He works as a director with FC Chayka Peschanokopskoye.

== Playing career ==
He made his debut in the Russian Premier League in 1999 for FC Krylia Sovetov Samara. Kaynov played for Levski Sofia in the A PFG during the 2000/2001 season.

== Personal life ==
His son Maksim Kaynov is a professional footballer.
