= Pavel Shavrov =

Belarusian footballer

Personal information
- Date of birth: 29 January 1971 (age 55)
- Height: 1.82 m (6 ft 0 in)
- Position: Forward

Youth career
- 1990–1991: SKIF-RShVSM Minsk

Senior career*
Years	Team	Apps	(Gls)
1991	Gomselmash Gomel	17	(1)
1992	Neman Stolbtsy	14	(10)
1992–1995	Dinamo-93 Minsk	93	(45)
1996–1997	Dinamo Minsk	39	(9)
1998	Dinamo-93 Minsk	11	(8)
1998–1999	Shakhtyor Soligorsk	32	(13)
2000–2001	Molodechno-2000	23	(13)
2001	Rudensk	14	(7)
2002	Baranovichi	4	(3)
Total		247	(109)

International career
1995	Belarus	1	(0)
- * Club domestic league appearances and goals

Pavel Shavrov (Belarusian: Павел Шаўроў; Russian: Павел Шавров; born 29 January 1971) is a retired Belarusian professional footballer and Belarus international. He was a top scorer of Belarusian Premier League in 1994–95 season.

== Honours ==
Dinamo-93 Minsk

- Belarusian Cup winner: 1994–95

Dinamo Minsk

- Belarusian Premier League champion: 1997

Individual

- Belarusian Premier League top scorer: 1994–95
