= State Museum of Oriental Art =

Coordinates: 55.7564°N 37.5998°E

Museum of Oriental Art

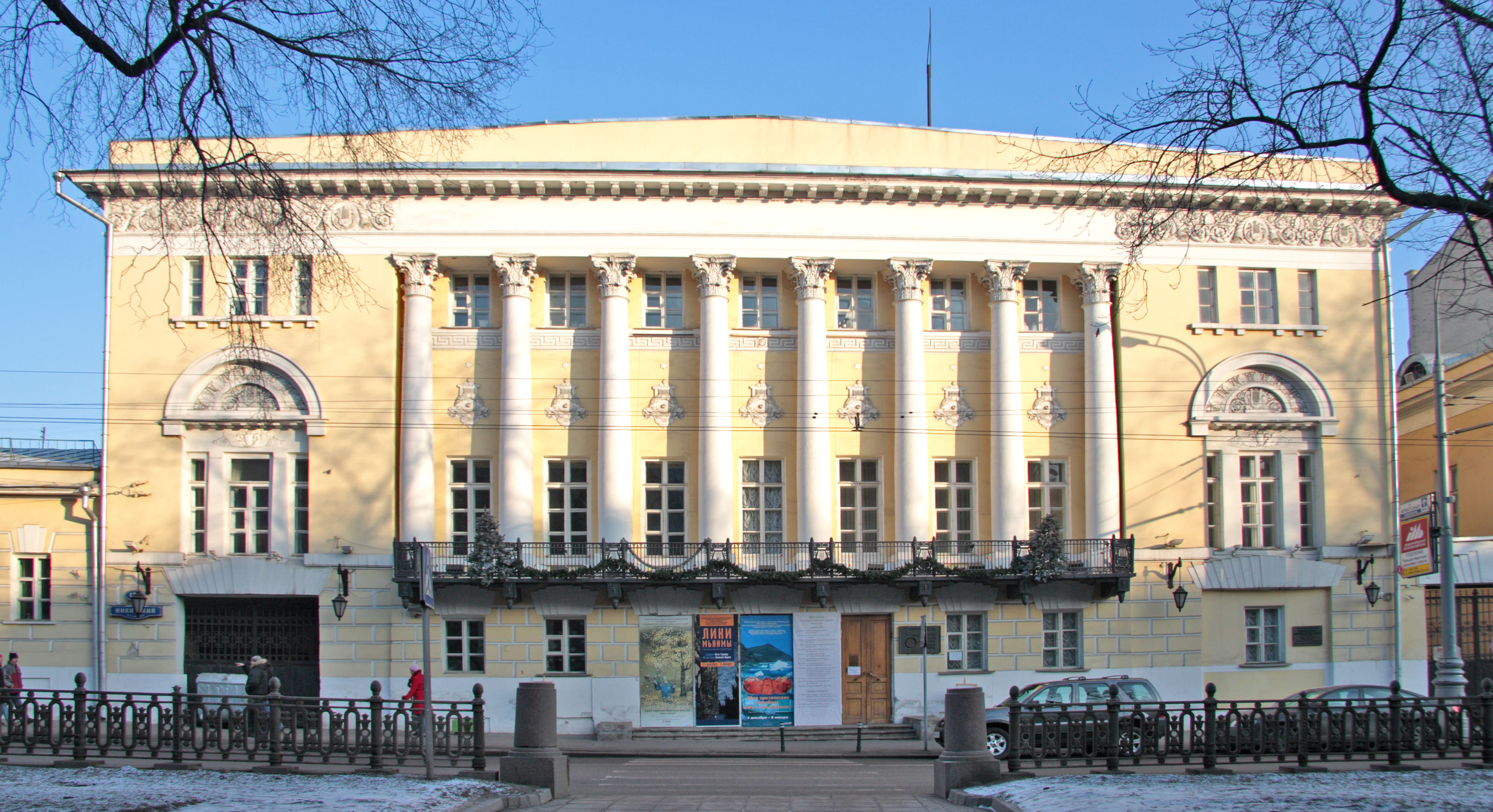
- Former name: Ars Asiatica (1918—1925)
- Established: 1918
- Location: Moscow, Russia
- Type: Art museum
- Website: Official website (English)

The State Museum of Oriental Art (Russian: Музей Востока) is one of the biggest cultural institutions in the world for preservation, research, and display of Oriental art. The museum was founded in 1918 as a part of soviet programme to support unique cultures of USSR subdivisions. Since 1970 the museum is located in the centre of Moscow in the historical building known as the Lunins' House, a private residence built in the early 19th century by the famous architect Domenico Gilardi.

The museum has galleries for the art and archaeology of India, Persia, China, Japan, Buryatia, Transcaucasia, and the Chukchi Peninsula. A major part of the Persian collection was donated by General Tardov in 1929.

In 2017 the Nicholas Roerich Museum was established as a part of the State Museum of Oriental Art. Named after the prominent Russian artist Nicholas Roerich, the new museum holds more than 800 masterpieces of Western painters from his collection and numerous items of decorative and applied arts, that the Roerich family brought from India.

== History ==
=== Establishment ===
Before the October Revolution Moscow had no centres of Oriental studies. When the independent republics were declared within the USSR, the government decided to establish a special museum for the East nations and their heritage. The project was developed by the Russian historian Pavel Muratov and supported by Igor Grabar, who was a leading art historian and a specialist in museum affairs. In a few months they opened ‘Ars Asiatica’, at first on the premises of the Russian State Historical Museum, then moved to Tsvetkov Mansion on Prechistenskaya Embankment.

=== Collection ===
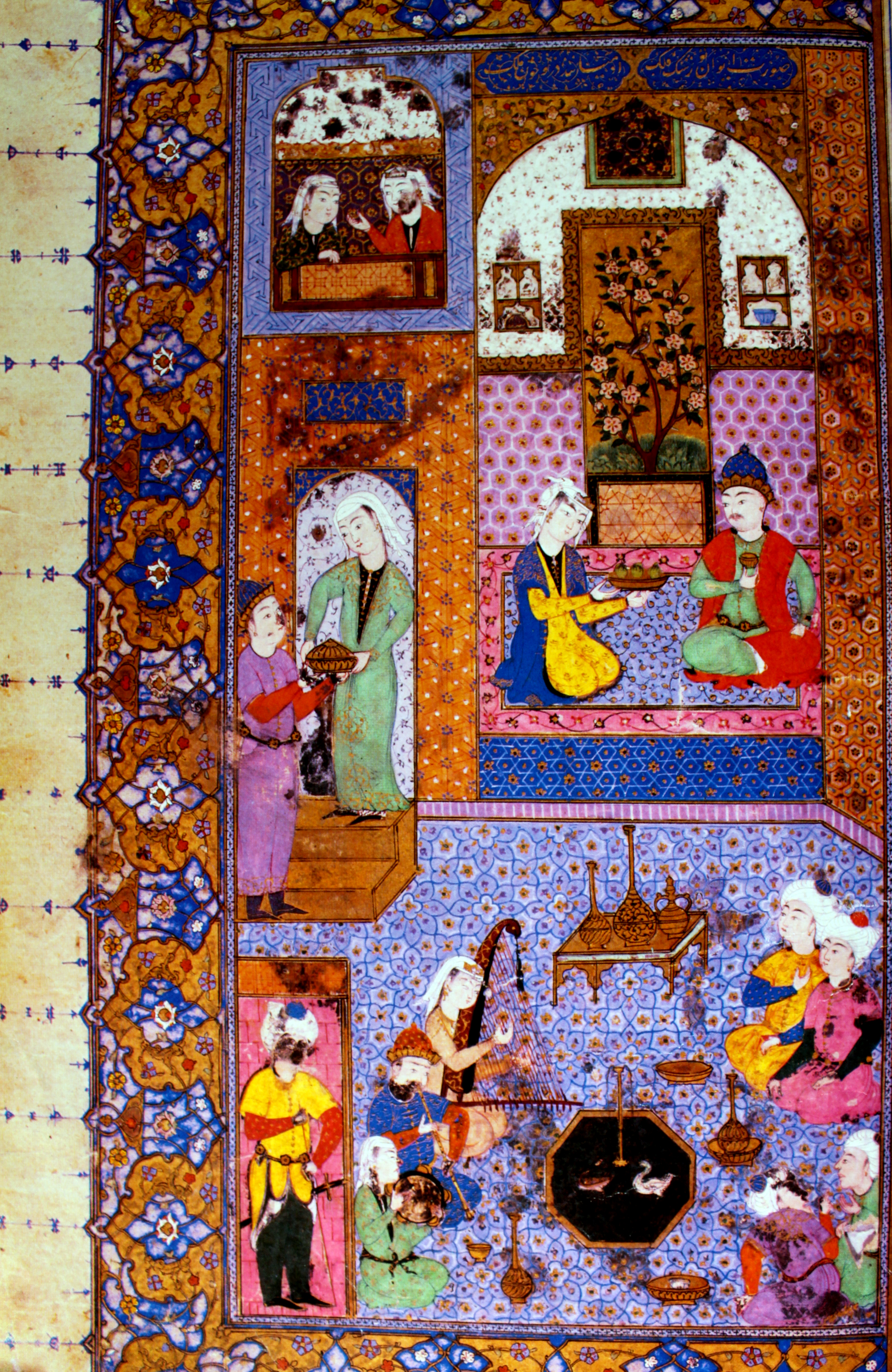
1491 miniature, collection of the museum

The collection includes items from the National Museum Fund, antique shops, and nationalized private collections of noble families, taken by the government after the Revolution. In 1920s some items were transferred from the Polytechnic Museum, the Pushkin State Museum of Fine Arts, and the State Historical Museum.

The major part of the collection was donated by private philanthropists. For example, Pyotr Shchukin had a keen interest in Oriental art and gathered a solid collection of old master prints and figurines from China, Iran, and India. In 1910 he established a private museum at Malaya Gruzinskaya street. After the Revolution, it was nationalized and given to the Museum of Oriental Art. The museum also received private collections of Pavel Kharitonenko, perfumer Henri Brocard, Orientalist Alexey Pozndeev, Nikolay Mosolov, and Igor Grabar.

Since 1924 the museum launched several expeditions to the Far East in order to collect new artifacts. By order of the Soviet government, from 1930 the exhibitions included propaganda materials.

== Contemporary activities ==
Nowadays new valuable items keep coming to the museum's vast collection through private donations and archaeological excavations. As of 2018, the collection includes more than 160,000 artefacts: paintings, graphics, sculpture, clothing, arms, and domestic items. Apart from its permanent exhibitions, the museum manages and co-creates various activities and events with other cultural organizations.

== Sources ==
- Shulepova, E. A. (2010). Музееведческая мысль в России XVIII-XX веков [Museological thought in Russia in the 18th-20th centuries] (in Russian). Moscow: Russian Institute of Cultural Studies.
