= Lunins' House =

Noble estate in Moscow, Russia

Coordinates: 55.7564°N 37.5998°E

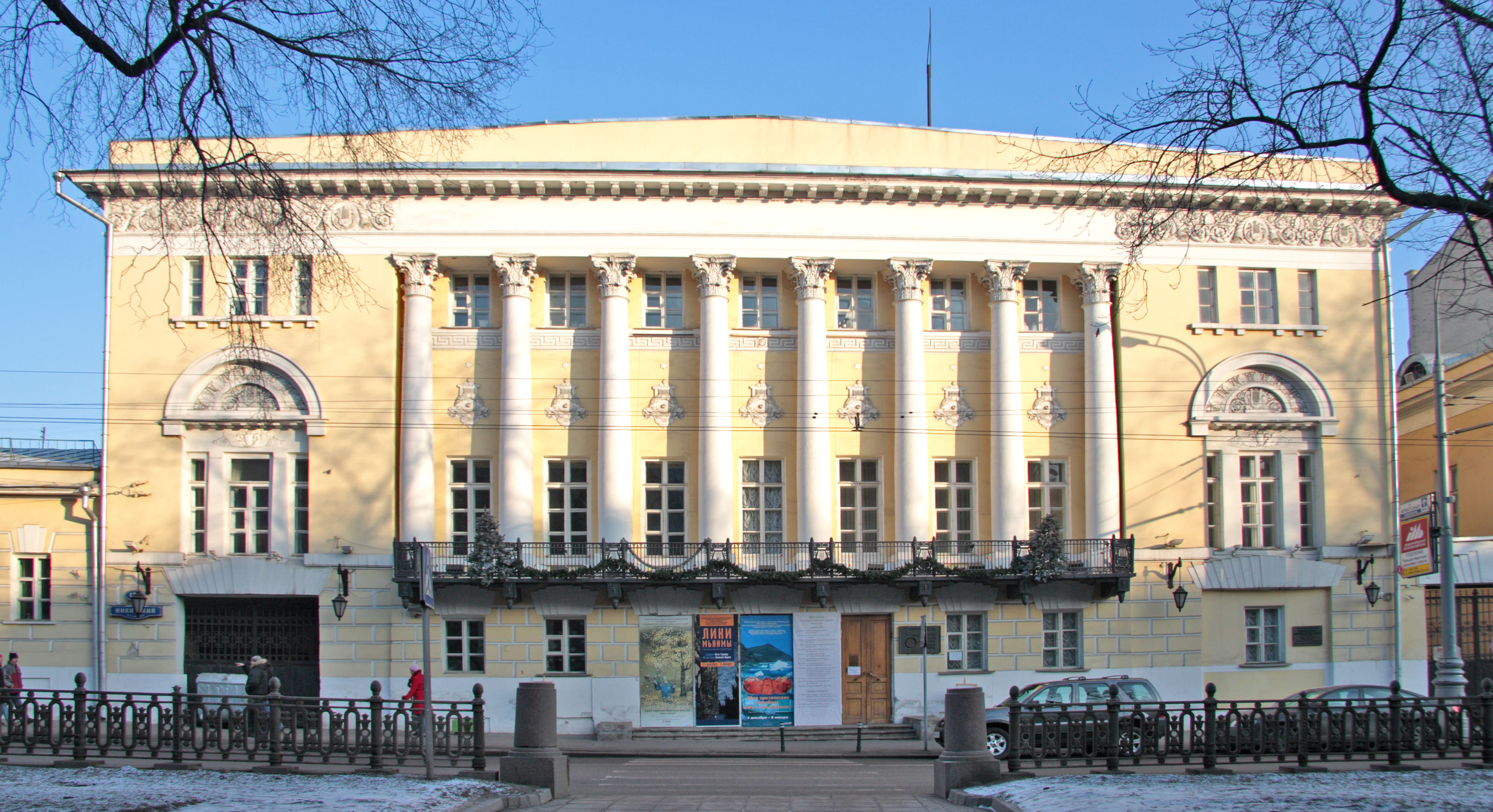
- Interactive map of the Lunins' House area

General information
- Architectural style: Neoclassical
- Location: Moscow, Russia
- Construction started: 1814
- Completed: 1823
- Client: Lunin noble family

Design and construction
- Architect: Domenico Gilardi

The Lunins' House is a former noble estate in Moscow Empire style, built by Italian architect Domenico Gilardi for the Lunins, an aristocratic family of pre-revolutionary Russia. The three-storied central mansion is vastly decorated with the avant-corps, reliefs, and is connected to two-storied wings, creating two closed courtyards. In 1821 the estate was sold to the State Empire Commercial Bank, that occupied the mansion till 1917. Since 1970 it belongs to the Museum of Oriental Art.

== History ==
The manor was owned by lieutenant-general Pyotr Lunin, who dedicated his life to his military career. At the beginning of the XIX century, the building was a classical manor composition, including the main building, outbuilding and separate buildings in the yard.

The buildings were badly damaged during the 1812 fire, so the Lunin family was forced to reconstruct the premises extensively. The rebuilding of the estate began in 1814 under the direction of the architect Domenico Gilardi, famous for his designs for buildings in the Moscow Empire style[1][6]. Over the next four years, the main building was volumetrically enlarged and the new façade faced Nikitsky boulevard; a two-storey annexe with a six-columned portico was built on the right, while a one-storey service building was added to the left. The two-storey annexe had an Ionic portico at the basement height and a bas-relief on the theme of the victory in the Patriotic War of 1812 was placed between the columns. The façade also featured thirty-two images from ancient Greek mythology, including a lyre. The decorations of the house were dedicated to Peter Lunin's daughter, the opera singer Catherine Ricci.

Due to financial problems in 1821, the Lunin family was forced to sell the main building to the Commercial Bank, and they moved into the outbuilding. After the death of Peter Lunin in 1822, the widow Evdokia Lunina sold the remaining buildings of the estate to the bank. When the complex was sold, Gilyardi had to change the design of the building and add some public functions to it: the main building had a front entrance, which was atypical of the manor buildings of that time. The colonnade was converted into a horizontal shallow loggia with an openwork balcony that also served as an entrance canopy. In 1860 the Commercial Bank was transformed into the State Bank, which existed until the Revolution of 1917.

After the revolution, the manor housed government institutions. In 1970, the building came into possession of the Museum of the East. The restoration, which lasted until 1984, restored the interior decoration, repaired the communications, as well as reconstructed the stucco, wall paintings and plafonds.

== Sources ==
- Shvidkovsky, Dmitrii (2007). Russian Architecture and the West. London: Yale University Press. p. 306. ISBN 978-0-300-10912-2.
