= Andrey Downar =

Belarusian footballer and coach

Personal information
- Date of birth: 29 January 1973 (age 53)
- Place of birth: Minsk, Soviet Union
- Position: Midfielder

Team information
- Current team: Minsk (youth coach)

Senior career*
Years	Team	Apps	(Gls)
1992	SKIF-RShVSM Minsk	15	(2)
1992–1995	Dinamo-93 Minsk	91	(1)
1996–1998	Dinamo Minsk	48	(11)
1998–1999	Torpedo-MAZ Minsk	26	(4)
1999–2001	Shakhtyor Soligorsk	66	(12)
2002–2004	Torpedo-SKA Minsk	77	(6)
2005	Slavia Mozyr	7	(0)
2005	Smena Minsk	13	(1)
2006	Minsk	26	(4)

International career
1994–1995	Belarus U21	3	(0)
1995–1997	Belarus	14	(0)

Managerial career
- 2006–2011: Minsk (assistant)
- 2011: Minsk (caretaker)
- 2012–2014: Minsk-2 (assistant)
- 2015–: Minsk (youth)
- * Club domestic league appearances and goals

Andrey Downar (Belarusian: Андрэй Доўнар; Russian: Андрей Довнар; born 29 January 1973) is a Belarusian professional football coach and former player.

== Honours ==
Dinamo-93 Minsk

- Belarusian Cup winner: 1994–95

Dinamo Minsk

- Belarusian Premier League champion: 1997
