= Vadzim Lasowski =

Belarusian footballer

Personal information
- Date of birth: 4 October 1975 (age 51)
- Place of birth: Minsk, Belarusian SSR
- Position: Defender

Youth career
- Smena Minsk

Senior career*
Years	Team	Apps	(Gls)
1993–1994	Smena Minsk	5	(0)
1994–1998	Dinamo-93 Minsk	56	(0)
1998	Dinamo Brest	14	(0)
1999	Shakhtyor Soligorsk	8	(0)
2000–2002	Dinamo Minsk	66	(3)
2003–2007	Shakhtyor Soligorsk	55	(0)
2007–2009	Granit Mikashevichi	48	(1)
2010	Slutsksakhar Slutsk	26	(0)

International career
1996–1997	Belarus U21	5	(0)

Managerial career
- 2010–2019: Shakhtyor Soligorsk (coach)
- 2020–2022: Dinamo Minsk (academy coach)
- 2023–: Dinamo Brest (assistant)
- * Club domestic league appearances and goals

Vadzim Lasowski (Belarusian: Вадзім Ласоўскі; Russian: Вадим Ласовский; born 4 October 1975) is a Belarusian football coach and former player.

== Honours ==
Dinamo-93 Minsk

- Belarusian Cup winner: 1994–95

Dinamo Minsk

- Belarusian Cup winner: 2002–03

Shakhtyor Soligorsk

- Belarusian Premier League champion: 2005
- Belarusian Cup winner: 2003–04
