= Vadim Starkov =

Russian footballer and coach

Personal information
- Full name: Vadim Petrovich Starkov
- Date of birth: 20 April 1979 (age 47)
- Place of birth: Pskov, Russian SFSR
- Height: 1.86 m (6 ft 1 in)
- Position: Defender

Team information
- Current team: FC Salyut Belgorod (director of sports/assistant coach)

Youth career
- FC Mashinostroitel Pskov

Senior career*
Years	Team	Apps	(Gls)
1996–2000	FC Pskov	110	(6)
2001	FC Chernomorets Novorossiysk	8	(0)
2002	FC Gazovik-Gazprom Izhevsk	23	(0)
2003–2004	FC Khimki	63	(1)
2005–2006	FC Lada Togliatti	64	(6)
2007–2013	FC Salyut Belgorod	174	(7)
2016	FC Energomash Belgorod	1	(0)

Managerial career
- 2019–: FC Salyut Belgorod (director of sports)
- 2019–: FC Salyut Belgorod (assistant)
- * Club domestic league appearances and goals

Vadim Petrovich Starkov (Russian: Вадим Петрович Старков; born 20 April 1979) is a Russian professional football coach and a former player. He is a director of sports and assistant coach with FC Salyut Belgorod.

== Club career ==
He made his debut in the Russian Premier League in 2001 for FC Chernomorets Novorossiysk.

== Honours ==
- Russian Cup finalist: 2005.
