= Albert Oskolkov =

Russian footballer

Personal information
- Full name: Albert Nikolayevich Oskolkov
- Date of birth: 9 August 1973 (age 53)
- Place of birth: Gorky, Russian SFSR
- Height: 1.78 m (5 ft 10 in)
- Position: Defender

Senior career*
Years	Team	Apps	(Gls)
1991	Khimik Dzerzhinsk	8	(0)
1991–1997	Lokomotiv Nizhny Novgorod	149	(1)
1998	Uralan Elista	1	(0)
1998	Metallurg Lipetsk	17	(1)
1999	Torpedo-ZIL Moscow	21	(0)
2000	CSKA Moscow	7	(0)
2000	Metallurg Krasnoyarsk	16	(0)
2001	Lokomotiv Nizhny Novgorod	29	(7)
2002	Volgar-Gazprom Astrakhan	12	(0)
2003–2004	Metallurg-Kuzbass Novokuznetsk	45	(1)
2004	MTZ-RIPO Minsk	7	(0)
2005–2006	Spartak Nizhny Novgorod	56	(2)
2006	Spartak Kostroma	13	(0)
2007	Oruzheynik Tula	0	(0)
2008–2009	Rusichi Oryol	40	(1)

International career
1993	Russia U-20	1	(0)
1994–1995	Russia U-21	8	(1)
- * Club domestic league appearances and goals

Albert Nikolayevich Oskolkov (Russian: Альберт Николаевич Осколков; born 9 August 1973) is a Russian former professional footballer.

== Club career ==
He made his debut in the Russian Premier League in 1992 for FC Lokomotiv Nizhny Novgorod and played 2 games in the UEFA Intertoto Cup 1997 for them. He played in 109 Premier League matches before he scored his first goal (for Lokomotiv NN in May 1996).

== Honours ==
- Russian Cup finalist: 2000.
