= Uladzimir Mihurski =

Belarusian footballer

Personal information
- Full name: Uladzimir Iosifavich Mihurski
- Date of birth: 13 June 1968 (age 58)
- Place of birth: Mogilev, Belarusian SSR, Soviet Union
- Height: 1.80 m (5 ft 11 in)
- Position: Defender

Youth career
- DYuSSh Mogilev

Senior career*
Years	Team	Apps	(Gls)
1985	Dnepr Mogilev	7	(0)
1989–1990	Dnepr Mogilev	34	(0)
1990	Zorya Luhansk	10	(0)
1991–1992	Lokomotiv Nizhny Novgorod	30	(1)
1992–1995	Torpedo Mogilev	88	(0)
1995–1996	Al-Yarmouk	7	(2)
1996–1997	Torpedo-Kadino Mogilev	22	(4)
1997	Transmash Mogilev	10	(0)
- * Club domestic league appearances and goals

Uladzimir Iosifavich Mihurski (Belarusian: Уладзімір Іосіфавіч Мігурскі; Russian: Владимир Иосифович Мигурский; Vladimir Iosifovich Migurskiy; born 13 June 1968) is a former Belarusian football player.

== Honours ==
Torpedo Mogilev

- Belarusian Cup finalist: 1995
