= Aleksandr Familtsev =

Kazakhstani footballer and coach

Personal information
- Full name: Aleksandr Mikhailovich Familtsev
- Date of birth: 3 August 1975 (age 51)
- Place of birth: Pavlodar, Kazakh SSR
- Height: 1.80 m (5 ft 11 in)
- Position: Defender

Youth career
- FC Traktor Pavlodar

Senior career*
| Years | Team | Apps | (Gls) |
| 1992–1997 | FC Irtysh Pavlodar | 141 | (7) |
| 1998 | FC Lokomotiv Nizhny Novgorod | 0 | (0) |
| 1999–2000 | FC Access Petropavlovsk | 40 | (1) |
| 2001 | FC Torpedo Moscow | 13 | (1) |
| 2002–2005 | FC Tom Tomsk | 89 | (1) |
| 2006–2007 | FC Tobol | 22 | (1) |
| 2008 | FC Aktobe | 1 | (0) |
| 2009 | FC Mostovik-Primorye Ussuriysk (amateur) | | |
| 2009 | FC Torpedo Moscow (amateur) | | |
| 2010 | FC Sakhalin Yuzhno-Sakhalinsk | 20 | (1) |
| Total | | 247 | (9) |

International career
| 1997–2006 | Kazakhstan | 35 | (1) |

Managerial career
- 2011–2014: FC Tom Tomsk (reserves)
- 2014–2016: FC Tom-2 Tomsk (assistant)
- 2016–2017: FC Tom Tomsk (U-21 assistant)
- 2019: Kazakhstan U19
- 2020–2022: FC Tom Tomsk (director of football)
- 2023-: Turan
- * Club domestic league appearances and goals

Aleksandr Mikhailovich Familtsev (Russian: Александр Михайлович Фамильцев; born 3 August 1975) is a Kazakhstani football coach and a former player who currently coaches Turan. He also has Russian citizenship.

Familtsev made 34 appearances for the Kazakhstan national football team, scoring one goal.
