= Luís Fábio Gomes =

Brazilian footballer

Personal information
- Full name: Luís Fábio Gomes
- Date of birth: 11 November 1975 (age 50)
- Place of birth: São Paulo, Brazil
- Height: 1.73 m (5 ft 8 in)
- Position: Forward

Senior career*
Years	Team	Apps	(Gls)
1996–1997	Slovan Bratislava		
1997–2000	Spartak Trnava	64	(22)
2000–2002	Drnovice		
2000–2001	→ Ružomberok (loan)		
2002–2003	Marila Příbram		
2003–2005	Tescoma Zlín	21	(3)
2005	Inter Baku		
2005–2006	Petržalka	1	(0)
2006	Hellas Kagran		
2008–2009	SC Kirchberg/Pielach		
- * Club domestic league appearances and goals as of 7 April 2012

Luís Fábio Gomes (born 11 November 1975) is a Brazilian former football player.

== Career ==
He played for Slovak sides Slovan Bratislava, Spartak Trnava and Artmedia Petržalka.

Gomes has made 90 Czech Czech First League appearances, scoring 14 goals, for Drnovice, Marila Příbram and Tescoma Zlín.
