= Andrei Otyutsky =

Russian footballer

Personal information
- Full name: Andrei Ivanovich Otyutsky
- Date of birth: 27 April 1982 (age 44)
- Place of birth: Armavir, Russian SFSR
- Height: 1.84 m (6 ft 0 in)
- Position: Defender

Senior career*
Years	Team	Apps	(Gls)
1997–1998	FC Torpedo Armavir	12	(0)
1999–2000	FC Dynamo-2 Moscow	37	(0)
2001–2004	FC Dynamo Moscow	1	(0)
2004	→ FC Sodovik Sterlitamak (loan)	6	(0)
2005	FC Luch-Energiya Vladivostok	7	(0)
2006	FC Volgar-Gazprom Astrakhan	33	(1)
2007–2008	FC SKA Rostov-on-Don	54	(5)
2009	FC Salyut-Energia Belgorod	28	(1)
2010–2012	FC Chernomorets Novorossiysk	35	(3)
2012	FC Torpedo Armavir	13	(0)
2013	FC Biolog-Novokubansk	8	(1)
- * Club domestic league appearances and goals

Andrei Ivanovich Otyutsky (Russian: Андрей Иванович Отюцкий; born 27 April 1982) is a former Russian professional footballer.

== Club career ==
He made his debut in the Russian Premier League in 2001 for FC Dynamo Moscow.

== Honours ==
- Russian Second Division, Zone South best defender: 2010.
