= Zaur Mamutov =

Ukrainian-Russian footballer

Personal information
- Full name: Zaur Enverovich Mamutov
- Date of birth: 22 January 1980 (age 46)
- Height: 1.78 m (5 ft 10 in)
- Position: Defender

Senior career*
Years	Team	Apps	(Gls)
1997–1998	FC Fabus Bronnitsy	19	(0)
1999	FC Spartak Kostroma	35	(1)
2000–2001	PFC CSKA Moscow	1	(0)
2000	→ PFC CSKA-d Moscow (loan)	36	(3)
2001	FC Kuban Krasnodar	1	(0)
2002	FC Reutov (amateur)		
2003–2004	FC Reutov	54	(2)
2005–2008	FC Krymteplytsia Molodizhne	101	(8)
2009	FC Desna Chernihiv	4	(0)
2009–2010	FC Krymteplytsia Molodizhne	7	(1)
2011–2012	Hvardiyets Hvardiyske		
2013	Real Yalta		
2013–2014	Hvardiyets Hvardiyske		
2014	Spartak-KT Molodizhne		
2014–2015	Vodokanal Yalta		
2015	Spartak-KT Molodizhne		
2015	Istochne		
- * Club domestic league appearances and goals

Zaur Enverovich Mamutov (Russian: Заур Энверович Мамутов; Ukrainian: Заур Енверович Мамутов; Crimean Tatar: Zaur Enver oğlu Mamutov; born 22 January 1980) is a former Ukrainian-Russian football player.
