= House of Lunin =

Russian aristocratic family

House of Lunin Лунины
- Noble house
- Coat of arms of House Lunin
- Country: Grand Duchy of Moscow; Tsardom of Russia; Russian Empire
- Founded: 15th century
- Founder: Lukian Danilovich Lunia; Simeon Ivanov Lunin
- Estate: formerly Lunins' House

The House of Lunin was the name of several Russian noble families.
