= Dmitri Ivanov (footballer, born 1970) =

Russian footballer (1970–2023)

Personal information
- Full name: Dmitri Alekseyevich Ivanov
- Date of birth: 17 September 1970
- Place of birth: Kuybyshev, Russian SFSR, USSR
- Date of death: 11 July 2023 (aged 52)
- Height: 1.84 m (6 ft 0 in)
- Positions: Forward; midfielder

Youth career
- ShISP Volgograd

Senior career*
Years	Team	Apps	(Gls)
1987	Torpedo Volzhsky	5	(0)
1988	Tekstilshchik Kamyshin	16	(0)
1989	Zvezda Gorodishche	22	(2)
1990–1991	Krylia Sovetov Samara	75	(20)
1992	Torpedo Moscow	13	(0)
1992–1993	Krylia Sovetov Samara	7	(1)
1993–1994	Rotor Volgograd	9	(1)
1995	Torpedo Volzhsky	39	(15)
1996	Energiya-Tekstilshchik Kamyshin	12	(0)
1997–1999	Uralan Eliste	87	(16)
2000	Rostselmash Rostov-on-Don	18	(0)
2001	Rubin Kazan	7	(1)
2002	Metallurg Krasnoyarsk	5	(1)
2002–2003	Olimpia Volgograd	32	(6)

Managerial career
- 2004–2006: Olimpia Volgograd (assistant)
- 2007: Olimpia Volgograd (administrator)
- 2007–2008: Olimpia Volgograd (director)
- 2012–2023: Olimpia Volgograd (assistant)
- * Club domestic league appearances and goals

Dmitri Alekseyevich Ivanov (Russian: Дмитрий Алексеевич Иванов; 17 September 1970 – 11 July 2023) was a Russian professional football player and coach.

== Playing career ==
Ivanov made his professional debut in the Soviet Second League in 1987 for Torpedo Volzhsky. He played two games in the UEFA Intertoto Cup 2000 for Rostselmash Rostov-on-Don.

== Death ==
Ivanov died on 11 July 2023, at the age of 52.

== Honours ==
- Russian Cup finalist: 1995 (played in the early stages of the 1994/95 tournament for FC Rotor Volgograd).
