= Ihar Tarlowski =

Belarusian footballer

Personal information
- Full name: Ihar Viktorovich Tarlowski
- Date of birth: 21 September 1974 (age 52)
- Place of birth: Minsk, Belarusian SSR
- Height: 1.80 m (5 ft 11 in)
- Positions: Defender; midfielder

Team information
- Current team: Dinamo Brest (assistant coach)

Youth career
- 1992–1993: Belarus Minsk

Senior career*
| Years | Team | Apps | (Gls) |
| 1993–1997 | Dinamo-93 Minsk | 78 | (7) |
| 1997 | Dinamo Minsk | 2 | (0) |
| 1998 | Dinamo-93 Minsk | 11 | (0) |
| 1998–2004 | Alania Vladikavkaz | 127 | (9) |
| 2005 | Fakel Voronezh | 23 | (0) |
| 2006 | Gomel | 14 | (3) |
| 2007–2008 | Darida Minsk Raion | 49 | (4) |
| 2009 | Smorgon | 16 | (1) |

International career
| 1992–1995 | Belarus U21 | 7 | (0) |
| 1999–2005 | Belarus | 22 | (1) |

Managerial career
- 2008: Darida Minsk Raion (assistant)
- 2010: Torpedo Zhodino (assistant)
- 2012–2021: Torpedo-BelAZ Zhodino (assistant)
- 2022: Slutsk (reserves)
- 2023: Arsenal Dzerzhinsk (assistant)
- 2024–: Dinamo Brest (assistant)
- * Club domestic league appearances and goals

Ihar Tarlowski (Belarusian: Ігар Тарлоўскі; Russian: Игорь Викторович Тарловский; born 21 September 1974) is a Belarusian professional football coach and former player.

== Playing career ==
He made his professional debut in the Belarusian Premier League in 1993 for FC Dinamo-93 Minsk.

== Honours ==
Dinamo-93 Minsk

- Belarusian Cup winner: 1994–95

Dinamo Minsk

- Belarusian Premier League champion: 1997
