= Andrei Liforenko =

Russian footballer

Personal information
- Full name: Andrei Vladimirovich Liforenko
- Date of birth: 20 June 1975 (age 51)
- Place of birth: Leningrad, Russian SFSR
- Height: 1.76 m (5 ft 9 1/2 in)
- Position: Defender

Youth career
- Smena St. Petersburg

Senior career*
Years	Team	Apps	(Gls)
1993–1995	FC Saturn-1991 Saint Petersburg	66	(1)
1996–1999	FC Lokomotiv Saint Petersburg	104	(4)
1996–1997	→ FC Lokomotiv-d Saint Petersburg (loans)	6	(1)
2000	FC Rubin Kazan	8	(0)
2000	→ FC Rubin-2 Kazan (loan)	1	(0)
2000	FC Dynamo-Stroyimpuls St. Petersburg	5	(2)
2001	PFC CSKA Moscow	1	(0)
2001	FC Torpedo-ZIL Moscow	6	(0)
2002	FC Krasnoznamensk	37	(1)
2004	FC Shakhter Karagandy	17	(0)
2005	FC Mordovia Saransk	26	(0)
- * Club domestic league appearances and goals

Andrei Vladimirovich Liforenko (Russian: Андрей Владимирович Лифоренко; born 20 June 1975) is a former Russian football player.
