= Ruslan Dzutsev =

Russian footballer

Personal information
- Full name: Ruslan Tamerlanovich Dzutsev
- Date of birth: 31 March 1984 (age 42)
- Height: 1.80 m (5 ft 11 in)
- Position: Forward

Youth career
- FC Spartak Vladikavkaz

Senior career*
Years	Team	Apps	(Gls)
2000–2003	FC Alania Vladikavkaz	19	(1)
2002	→ FC Alania-d Vladikavkaz (loan)	1	(0)
- * Club domestic league appearances and goals as of 30 April 2015

Ruslan Tamerlanovich Dzutsev (Russian: Руслан Тамерланович Дзуцев; born 31 March 1984) is a former Russian football player.

He represented Russia at the 2001 UEFA European Under-16 Championship.
