= Dmitri Parmuzin =

Russian footballer and manager

Personal information
- Full name: Dmitri Vladimirovich Parmuzin
- Date of birth: 11 October 1979 (age 47)
- Place of birth: Volgograd, Russian SFSR
- Height: 1.83 m (6 ft 0 in)
- Positions: Defender; midfielder

Team information
- Current team: FC VGAFK Volgograd (manager)

Youth career
- UOR Volgograd

Senior career*
Years	Team	Apps	(Gls)
1995–2000	FC Rotor Volgograd	6	(0)
1995–2000	→ FC Rotor-d Volgograd (loans)	89	(8)
1999	→ FC Energetik Uren (loan)	28	(4)
2001	FC Lada Togliatti	5	(0)
2001–2003	FC KAMAZ Naberezhnye Chelny	22	(2)
2005	FC Olimpia Volgograd	6	(0)
2005	FC Elista (amateur)		
2006	FC Elista	1	(0)
2006	FC Tsement Mikhaylovka (amateur)		
2007–2008	FC Zenit Penza	54	(1)
2009–2010	FC Tsement Mikhaylovka (amateur)		
2011	FC Gigant Sotnikovskoye		
2011–2012	FC Lokomotiv Kavkazsky Raion		

Managerial career
- 2012–: FC VGAFK Volgograd
- * Club domestic league appearances and goals

Dmitri Vladimirovich Parmuzin (Russian: Дмитрий Владимирович Пармузин; born 11 October 1979 in Volgograd) is a Russian football coach and a former player. He manages an amateur side FC VGAFK Volgograd.
