= Serhiy Borysenko =

Ukrainian footballer (born 1974)

Personal information
- Full name: Serhiy Mykolayovych Borysenko
- Date of birth: 17 April 1974 (age 52)
- Place of birth: Cherkasy, Ukrainian SSR
- Height: 1.96 m (6 ft 5 in)
- Position: Forward

Senior career*
Years	Team	Apps	(Gls)
1993–1994	Dnipro Cherkasy	25	(3)
1995–1997	Zirka-NIBAS Kirovohrad	65	(22)
1997	CSKA Kyiv	16	(3)
1997	→ CSKA-2 Kyiv	1	(0)
1997–1999	Slovan Bratislava	35	(5)
2000	Alania Vladikavkaz	21	(2)
2001	Tavriya Simferopol	9	(0)
2001	Enerhetyk Burshtyn	1	(0)
2001–2002	Prykarpattya Ivano-Frankivsk	16	(7)
2002–2003	Kryvbas Kryvyi Rih	14	(1)
2003–2004	Spartak Ivano-Frankivsk	18	(6)
2004–2007	Fakel Ivano-Frankivsk	31	(13)
- * Club domestic league appearances and goals

Serhiy Mykolayovych Borysenko (Ukrainian: Сергій Миколайович Борисенко; born 17 April 1974 in Cherkasy) is a former Ukrainian football player.

== Honours ==
Slovan Bratislava

- Slovak Super Liga champion: 1998–99
- Slovak Cup winner: 1998–99
