= Yuri Okroshidze =

Russian footballer and coach

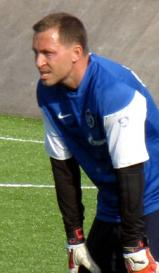

Personal information
- Full name: Yuri Aleksandrovich Okroshidze
- Date of birth: 23 August 1970 (age 56)
- Place of birth: Leningrad, Soviet Union
- Height: 1.87 m (6 ft 2 in)
- Position: Goalkeeper

Team information
- Current team: FC Zenit Saint Petersburg (GK coach)

Senior career*
Years	Team	Apps	(Gls)
1987–1995	FC Zenit St. Petersburg	85	(0)
1995	FC Saturn-1991 St. Petersburg	18	(0)
1996	FC Zenit St. Petersburg	11	(0)
1997–1998	FC Sokol Saratov	80	(0)
1999	FC Rubin Kazan	40	(0)
2000	PFC CSKA Moscow	19	(0)
2001–2004	FC Uralan Elista	80	(0)
2005	FC Sokol Saratov	15	(0)
2006	FC SKA Rostov-on-Don	3	(0)

Managerial career
- 2007–2013: FC Zenit St. Petersburg (reserves GK coach)
- 2013–2014: FC Tom Tomsk (GK coach)
- 2014–2018: FC Zenit-2 Saint Petersburg (GK coach)
- 2018–2023: FC Zenit St. Petersburg (reserves GK coach)
- 2023: FC Chernomorets Novorossiysk (GK coach)
- 2024–2025: FC Orenburg (GK coach)
- 2026: FC Zenit-2 Saint Petersburg (GK coach)
- 2026–: FC Zenit St. Petersburg (GK coach)
- * Club domestic league appearances and goals

Yuri Aleksandrovich Okroshidze (Russian: Юрий Александрович Окрошидзе; born 23 August 1970) is a Russian professional football coach and a former player. He works as a goalkeepers coach for Zenit Saint Petersburg.

== Club career ==
He made his professional debut in the Soviet First League in 1990 for FC Zenit Leningrad.

== Honours ==
=== Club ===
CSKA Moscow

- Russian Cup: runner-up 2000

=== Individual ===
- L'Alcúdia International Football Tournament Best Goalkeeper: 1988, 1989
