= Vyacheslav Gerashchenko =

Belarusian footballer (born 1972)

Personal information
- Full name: Vyacheslav Leonidovich Gerashchenko
- Date of birth: 25 July 1972 (age 54)
- Place of birth: Mogilev, Belarusian SSR, Soviet Union
- Height: 1.75 m (5 ft 9 in)
- Position: Defender

Team information
- Current team: Smorgon (manager)

Senior career*
Years	Team	Apps	(Gls)
1990–1993	Dnepr Mogilev	51	(0)
1994	Shinnik Bobruisk	13	(1)
1995	Torpedo Mogilev	14	(1)
1995–1999	Chernomorets Novorossiysk	121	(15)
2000	CSKA Moscow	9	(0)
2000	Slavia Mozyr	15	(4)
2001–2003	Uralan Elista	69	(1)
2004–2005	Naftan Novopolotsk	35	(2)
2006	Savit Mogilev	8	(1)
Total		327	(24)

International career
1997–2004	Belarus	19	(0)

Managerial career
- 2006–2008: Savit Mogilev (assistant)
- 2009–2011: BATE Borisov (reserves)
- 2011–2013: Dnepr Mogilev
- 2016: Belshina Bobruisk
- 2016: Lida
- 2016–2018: Gomel
- 2019: Lida
- 2019: Palanga
- 2020–2021: Smorgon
- 2022: Naftan Novopolotsk
- 2023–2024: Dnepr Mogilev
- 2025: Dinamo-2 Minsk
- 2026: Naftan Novopolotsk
- 2026–: Smorgon
- * Club domestic league appearances and goals

Vyacheslav Leonidovich Gerashchenko (Belarusian: Вячаслаў Леанідавіч Герашчанка; Russian: Вячеслав Леонидович Геращенко; born 25 July 1972) is a Belarusian professional football coach and a former player.

== Club career ==
Gerashchenko played for Chernomorets Novorossiysk, CSKA Moscow and Uralan Elista in the Russian Premier League. He retired after rupturing his Achilles tendon at age 34.

== International career ==
Gerashchenko made 19 appearances for the Belarus national team.

== Honours ==
Slavia Mozyr

- Belarusian Premier League: 2000
