= Ivan Danshin =

Russian footballer

Personal information
- Full name: Ivan Aleksandrovich Danshin
- Date of birth: 20 April 1982 (age 44)
- Height: 1.77 m (5 ft 9 1/2 in)
- Position: Forward

Youth career
- 1995–1999: PFC CSKA Moscow

Senior career*
Years	Team	Apps	(Gls)
1999–2001	PFC CSKA Moscow	12	(1)
1999–2000	→ PFC CSKA-d Moscow	43	(12)
2001	FC Torpedo-ZIL Moscow	0	(0)
2002	FC Kuban Krasnodar	2	(0)
2002–2003	FC Zirka Kirovohrad	3	(1)
2005	FC Zenit Moscow		
2005	FC Chernomorets Novorossiysk (amateur)		
- * Club domestic league appearances and goals

Ivan Aleksandrovich Danshin (Russian: Иван Александрович Даньшин; born 20 April 1982) is a former Russian professional footballer.

== Club career ==
He made his professional debut in the Russian Second Division in 1999 for PFC CSKA-d Moscow.

== Honours ==
- Russian Cup finalist: 2000.
