= Aleksei Bychkov =

Russian footballer

Personal information
- Full name: Aleksei Yuryevich Bychkov
- Date of birth: 8 November 1972 (age 53)
- Place of birth: Moscow, Russian SFSR
- Height: 1.75 m (5 ft 9 in)
- Position: Striker

Youth career
- FC Lokomotiv Moscow

Senior career*
Years	Team	Apps	(Gls)
1990–1993	PFC CSKA-2 Moscow	103	(31)
1993	FC Shinnik Yaroslavl	19	(10)
1994	PFC CSKA Moscow	2	(0)
1994	→ PFC CSKA-d Moscow	8	(2)
1994–1999	FC Shinnik Yaroslavl	178	(45)
2000	PFC CSKA Moscow	22	(8)
2000	→ PFC CSKA-d Moscow	3	(0)
2001–2002	FC Shinnik Yaroslavl	49	(10)
2003	FC Fakel Voronezh	22	(1)
- * Club domestic league appearances and goals

Aleksei Yuryevich Bychkov (Russian: Алексей Юрьевич Бычков; born 8 November 1972) is a former Russian professional footballer.

== Club career ==
He made his professional debut in the Soviet Second League B in 1990 for PFC CSKA-2 Moscow.

== Honours ==
- Russian Cup finalist: 1994, 2000.

== European club competitions ==
- UEFA Intertoto Cup 1998 with FC Shinnik Yaroslavl: 1 game.
- UEFA Cup 2000–01 with PFC CSKA Moscow: 2 games.
