= Vadym Alpatov =

Ukrainian footballer

Personal information
- Full name: Vadym Yuriyovych Alpatov
- Date of birth: 22 April 1980 (age 46)
- Height: 1.79 m (5 ft 10 1/2 in)
- Position: Midfielder

Senior career*
Years	Team	Apps	(Gls)
2000–2001	FC Lokomotiv Nizhny Novgorod	2	(0)
2003	MFC Mykolaiv	13	(0)
2003	→ Olimpiya FC AES Yuzhnoukrainsk (loan)	5	(0)
2004	FC Okzhetpes	12	(0)
2004	FC Ivan Odesa		
- * Club domestic league appearances and goals

Vadym Yuriyovych Alpatov (Ukrainian: Вадим Юрійович Алпатов; born 22 April 1980) is a Ukrainian former football player.
