= Stanislav Lysenko =

Russian footballer

Personal information
- Full name: Stanislav Anatolyevich Lysenko
- Date of birth: 8 January 1972 (age 54)
- Place of birth: Krasnodar, Russian SFSR
- Height: 1.79 m (5 ft 10 in)
- Positions: Midfielder; striker; defender

Team information
- Current team: FC Urozhay Krasnodar (CEO)

Youth career
- SDYuSShOR-5 Krasnodar

Senior career*
Years	Team	Apps	(Gls)
1989–1990	FC Kuban Barannikovsky		
1991–1997	FC Kuban Krasnodar	209	(73)
1998–1999	FC Rubin Kazan	59	(16)
2000–2001	PFC CSKA Moscow	33	(5)
2002–2004	FC Kuban Krasnodar	74	(13)
2004–2009	FC GNS-Spartak Krasnodar (amateur)		
2018–2019	FC Kuban Krasnodar (amateur)		

Managerial career
- 2009–2012: FC Krasnodar (VP of sports)
- 2018–2019: FC Kuban Krasnodar (director, PM, VP of sports)
- 2019–: FC Urozhay Krasnodar (CEO)
- * Club domestic league appearances and goals

Stanislav Anatolyevich Lysenko (Russian: Станислав Анатольевич Лысенко; born 8 January 1972) is a Russian professional football official and a former player.

== Club career ==
He made his professional debut in the Soviet Second League B in 1990 for FC Kuban Barannikovsky.

== Honours ==
- Russian Cup winner: 2002 (played in the early stages of the 2001/02 tournament for PFC CSKA Moscow).

== Personal life ==
His son Nikita Lysenko is now a football player as well.
