= Mikhail Lunin (footballer) =

Russian footballer and coach

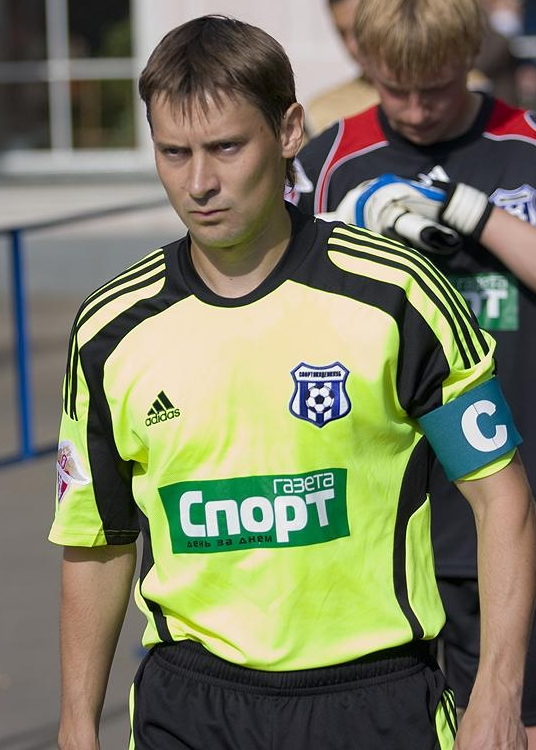
- Lunin in 2008

Personal information
- Full name: Mikhail Yuryevich Lunin
- Date of birth: 31 May 1978 (age 48)
- Height: 1.77 m (5 ft 9 1/2 in)
- Position: Midfielder

Team information
- Current team: FC Chelyabinsk (fitness coach)

Youth career
- FC Fabus Bronnitsy

Senior career*
Years	Team	Apps	(Gls)
1995	FC Fabus Bronnitsy		
1995–1997	FC Dynamo-2 Moscow	99	(11)
1999	FC Uralan Elista	1	(0)
1999–2000	RC Harelbeke	1	(0)
2000	FC Spartak-Chukotka Moscow	13	(1)
2000–2001	PFC CSKA Moscow	16	(1)
2001	FC Fakel Voronezh	13	(1)
2002–2003	FC Dynamo St. Petersburg	49	(3)
2004	FC Luch-Energiya Vladivostok	23	(0)
2005	Zhenis	10	(3)
2005	FC Anzhi Makhachkala	15	(0)
2006	FC Salyut-Energia Belgorod	2	(0)
2006	FC Fakel Voronezh	18	(3)
2007–2008	FC Sportakademklub Moscow	61	(17)
2009	FC Chernomorets Novorossiysk	15	(2)
2009	FC Gazovik Orenburg	3	(0)
2010	FC Oka Stupino (amateur)		
2012–2013	FC Dolgoprudny	18	(1)
2014	FC Troitsk		
2016	FC Dolgoprudny-2		

Managerial career
- 2014–2016: FC Dolgoprudny (conditioning coach)
- 2020–2021: FC Dynamo Moscow (U19 conditioning coach)
- 2021–2023: FC Dynamo-2 Moscow (conditioning coach)
- 2025: FC Rodina-2 Moscow (fitness coach)
- 2025–: FC Chelyabinsk (fitness coach)
- * Club domestic league appearances and goals

Mikhail Yuryevich Lunin (Russian: Михаил Юрьевич Лунин; born 31 May 1978) is a Russian professional football coach and a former player who is a fitness coach with FC Chelyabinsk.

== Club career ==
He made his debut in the Russian Premier League in 1999 for FC Uralan Elista. He played one game in the UEFA Cup 2000–01 for PFC CSKA Moscow.
