= Artyom Yenin =

Russian footballer (1976–2024)

Personal information
- Full name: Artyom Valeryevich Yenin
- Date of birth: 6 August 1976
- Place of birth: Yaroslavl, Russian SFSR, USSR
- Date of death: 8 October 2024 (aged 48)
- Height: 1.78 m (5 ft 10 in)
- Position: Midfielder

Senior career*
Years	Team	Apps	(Gls)
1993	FC Spartak Kostroma	28	(1)
1994	FC Shinnik Yaroslavl	27	(0)
1995	FC Neftyanik Yaroslavl	24	(4)
1996	FC Dynamo Vologda	37	(7)
1997–1999	FC Shinnik Yaroslavl	91	(6)
2000–2001	PFC CSKA Moscow	12	(0)
2001–2002	FC Shinnik Yaroslavl	13	(0)
2003–2004	FC Spartak Nalchik	77	(3)
2005	FC Ural Yekaterinburg	38	(0)
2006	FC Spartak Lukhovitsy	34	(4)
2007–2010	FC Spartak Kostroma	123	(4)
Total		504	(29)

International career
1998	Russia	1	(0)
- * Club domestic league appearances and goals

Artyom Valeryevich Yenin (Russian: Артём Валерьевич Енин; 6 August 1976 – 8 October 2024) was a Russian footballer who played as a midfielder.

== Career ==
Yenin played his only international game for Russia on 23 September 1998 in a friendly against Spain. He was a player in the CSKA Moscow team that were runners-up in the 1999–2000 Russian Cup.

== Personal life and death ==
His son, Yegor, is also a footballer, and was included on the roster of Shinnik Yaroslavl for the 2018–19 season.

Yenin died on 8 October 2024, at the age of 48. He was buried in the Leontievsky cemetery.

== Sources ==
- Player profile (in Russian)
