= Davron Fayziev =

Uzbekistani footballer (born 1976)

Personal information
- Date of birth: 16 January 1976 (age 50)
- Place of birth: Samarkand, Soviet Union
- Height: 1.82 m (6 ft 0 in)
- Position: Midfielder

Senior career*
Years	Team	Apps	(Gls)
1993–1995	Sogdiana Jizzakh	54	(1)
1996	MHSK Tashkent	24	(0)
1997–1999	Sogdiana Jizzakh	86	(7)
2000	Dinamo Samarqand	86	(7)
2000–2001	CSKA Moscow	23	(0)
2002	Alania Vladikavkaz	12	(0)
2003	Navbahor Namangan	13	(1)
2003–2006	Nasaf Qarshi	93	(4)
2007–2008	Dinamo Samarqand	58	(7)
2009	Sogdiana Jizzakh	27	(6)
2010	Xorazm Urganch	12	(0)
2011	Sogdiana Jizzakh	14	(0)

International career
1997–2007	Uzbekistan	26	(2)

Managerial career
- 2011–2017: Sogdiana Jizzakh
- * Club domestic league appearances and goals

Dаvrоn Fаyziеv (Uzbek: Даврон Файзиев) (born 14 January 1976) is an Uzbek retired professional football player and coach.

== Club career ==
Fаyziеv was born in Samarkand, Uzbekistan. played in position of defender and midfielder. He played for many Uzbek and Russian Premier League clubs such CSKA Moscow and Alania Vladikavkaz.

== International career ==
Fаyziеv made his debut in the Uzbekistan national team on 29 September 1997 in 1998 FIFA World Cup qualifying match against Cambodia won by Uzbekistan with 4–1. He played 26 matches for national team between 1997 and 2007, scoring 2 goals.

== Managerial career ==
In 2011 Fаyziеv finished his playing career and started managing career in Sogdiana Jizzakh. In 2012, he finished 1st with Sogdiana in First League and gained promotion to Uzbek League.
