= Rustem Bulatov =

Russian footballer

Personal information
- Full name: Rustem Talgatovich Bulatov
- Date of birth: 2 April 1974
- Place of birth: Kazan, Russian SFSR
- Date of death: 31 May 2008 (aged 34)
- Place of death: Kazan, Russia
- Height: 1.77 m (5 ft 9 1/2 in)
- Position: Defender

Youth career
- Rubin Kazan

Senior career*
Years	Team	Apps	(Gls)
1991	Rubin Kazan	4	(0)
1992	Idel Kazan	24	(0)
1993	Rubin-TAN	33	(0)
1994–1996	Neftekhimik Nizhnekamsk	88	(0)
1997–1999	Rubin Kazan	107	(2)
2000–2001	CSKA	24	(0)
2001	Kuban Krasnodar	2	(0)
2002	Dynamo St. Petersburg	21	(0)
2003	Kristall Smolensk	21	(0)
2003	Volgar-Gazprom Astrakhan	17	(0)
2004–2005	Tom Tomsk	38	(0)
2005	Anzhi	16	(0)
2006	Neftekhimik Nizhnekamsk	3	(0)
2008	Kazan Chelsea-Kasan	9	(0)
Total		411	(2)

Managerial career
- 2008: Torpedo SDYuSShOR Kaluga
- * Club domestic league appearances and goals

Rustem Talgatovich Bulatov (Russian: Рустем Талгатович Булатов; 2 April 1974 – 31 May 2008) was a Russian professional footballer.

== Career ==
Bulatov made his professional debut in the Soviet Second League B in 1991 for FC Rubin Kazan. He played 2 games in the UEFA Cup 2000–01 for PFC CSKA Moscow.

== Coaching career ==
He worked as head coach of Torpedo SDYuSShOR Kaluga before his death.

== Death ==
Bulatov died on 31 May 2008 after falling ill during a game (he was playing on a local amateur level at the time).

== Honors ==
- Russian Cup finalist: 2000.

== See also ==
- List of association footballers who died while playing
