= Aleksei Smetanin =

Russian footballer

Personal information
- Full name: Aleksei Valeryevich Smetanin
- Date of birth: 19 March 1981 (age 45)
- Height: 1.77 m (5 ft 9 1/2 in)
- Position: Forward

Youth career
- PFC CSKA Moscow

Senior career*
Years	Team	Apps	(Gls)
1999–2000	PFC CSKA Moscow	1	(0)
1999–2000	→ PFC CSKA-d Moscow (loan)	36	(3)
2001	FC Terek Grozny	15	(1)
2005	FC Titan Moscow	15	(2)
- * Club domestic league appearances and goals

Aleksei Valeryevich Smetanin (Russian: Алексей Валерьевич Сметанин; born 19 March 1981) is a former Russian football player.
