= Sergei Rodin =

Russian footballer (1981–2021)

Personal information
- Full name: Sergei Aleksandrovich Rodin
- Date of birth: 24 January 1981
- Place of birth: Moscow, RSFSR, Soviet Union
- Date of death: 16 January 2021 (aged 39)
- Height: 1.75 m (5 ft 9 in)
- Position: Midfielder

Youth career
- CSKA Moscow

Senior career*
Years	Team	Apps	(Gls)
1999–2001	CSKA Moscow	7	(0)
1999–2000	→ CSKA Moscow II	52	(9)
2002	Kuban Krasnodar	1	(0)
2003	FC Kristall Smolensk	19	(3)
2003	Novokuznetsk	14	(0)
2004	FC Vidnoye	14	(5)
2004–2005	Anzhi Makhachkala	26	(3)
2006	Sokol Saratov (amateur)		
2007–2008	Sportakademklub Moscow	48	(11)
2009–2010	Sokol Saratov	35	(8)

International career
1999–2000	Russia U-19	8	(4)
2001	Russia U-21	1	(0)
- * Club domestic league appearances and goals

Sergei Aleksandrovich Rodin (Russian: Серге́й Александрович Родин; 24 January 1981 – 16 January 2021) was a Russian professional football player.

== Club career ==
He made his debut in the Russian Premier League in 1999 for PFC CSKA Moscow.

== Honours ==
- Russian Premier League bronze: 1999.
