= FC Fabus Bronnitsy =

- Full name: Football Club Fabus Bronnitsy
- Founded: 1995
- Dissolved: 2004
- League: Amateur Football League, Zone Moscow Oblast
- 2003: 6th

FC Fabus Bronnitsy (Russian: «Фабус» (Бронницы)) was a Russian football team from Bronnitsy. It played professionally from 1995 to 2002. Their best result was 9th place in the Zone Centre of the Russian Second Division in 1999.
