= 1998 PFC CSKA Moscow season =

CSKA
1998 season
- Manager: Pavel Sadyrin (until July); Oleg Dolmatov (from July)
- Stadium: Dynamo Stadium; Grigory Fedotov Stadium; Lokomotiv Stadium
- Top Division: 2nd
- Russian Cup: Quarterfinal vs Rotor Volgograd
- Russian Cup: Continued in 1999
- Top goalscorer: League: Vladimir Kulik (14); All: Vladimir Kulik (17)

The 1998 CSKA season was the club's seventh season in the Russian Top Division, the highest tier of association football in Russia.

== Squad ==
As of match played 10 November 1998

Name	Nationality	Position	Date of birth (age)	Signed from	Signed in	Contract ends	Apps.	Goals
Goalkeepers
Vitali Baranov	(Russia)	GK	25 January 1980 (aged 18)	Zenit Izhevsk	1998		0	0
Andrei Novosadov	(Russia)	GK	27 March 1972 (aged 26)	KAMAZ	1993		67	0
Defenders
Maksim Bokov	(Russia)	DF	29 August 1973 (aged 25)	Zenit St.Petersburg	1997		64	1
Aleksandr Borodkin	(Russia)	DF	1 October 1971 (aged 27)	Tyumen	1998		14	2
Vladimir Isakov	(Russia)	DF	12 October 1979 (aged 19)	Academy	1998		1	0
Oleg Kornaukhov	(Russia)	DF	14 January 1975 (aged 23)	Shinnik Yaroslavl	1998		31	4
Valeri Minko	(Russia)	DF	8 August 1971 (aged 27)	Dynamo Barnaul	1989		197	11
Andrei Tsaplin	(Russia)	DF	22 January 1977 (aged 21)	Academy	1996		28	1
Yevgeni Varlamov	(Russia)	DF	25 July 1975 (aged 23)	KAMAZ	1998		32	2
Midfielders
Sergei Filippenkov	(Russia)	MF	2 August 1971 (aged 27)	CSK VVS-Kristall Smolensk	1998		30	6
Aleksandr Grishin	(Russia)	MF	18 November 1971 (aged 26)	Dynamo Moscow	1997		135	25
Aleksei Savelyev	(Russia)	MF	10 April 1977 (aged 21)	Torpedo Moscow	1997		45	4
Sergei Semak	(Russia)	MF	27 February 1976 (aged 22)	Asmaral Moscow	1994		133	30
Aleksandr Shvetsov	(Russia)	MF	17 December 1980 (aged 17)	Academy	1998		0	0
Dmitri Khomukha	(Turkmenistan)	MF	23 August 1969 (aged 29)	Zenit St.Petersburg	1997		67	14
Maksym Biletskyi	(Ukraine)	MF	7 January 1980 (aged 18)	Academy	1998		0	0
Oleksandr Shutov	(Ukraine)	MF	12 June 1975 (aged 23)	Rostselmash	1996		38	1
Forwards
Aleksei Babenko	(Russia)	FW	1 August 1972 (aged 26)	KAMAZ	1998		12	0
Aleksandr Gerasimov	(Russia)	FW	12 November 1969 (aged 28)	Shinnik Yaroslavl	1998		25	1
Sergey Korovushkin	(Russia)	FW	26 January 1979 (aged 19)	Volga Tver	1997		12	0
Sergei Kulichenko	(Russia)	FW	3 February 1978 (aged 20)	Academy	1997		6	1
Vladimir Kulik	(Russia)	FW	18 February 1972 (aged 26)	Zenit St.Petersburg	1997		66	28
Aleksandr Suchkov	(Russia)	FW	29 February 1980 (aged 18)	Fabus Bronnitsy	1998		0	0
Out on loan
Denis Pervushin	(Russia)	DF	18 January 1977 (aged 21)	TRASKO Moscow	1996		47	0
Left During the Season
Ihor Kutepov	(Ukraine)	GK	17 December 1965 (aged 32)	Tyumen	1997		24	0
Aleksandr Shchyogolev	(Russia)	DF	1 April 1972 (aged 26)	Fakel Voronezh	1998		10	0
Dmitri Kuznetsov	(Russia)	MF	28 August 1965 (aged 33)	Espanyol	1997		37	6
Dmitri Sennikov	(Russia)	MF	24 June 1976 (aged 22)	Lokomotiv St.Petersburg	1998		7	0
Sergey Shustikov	(Russia)	MF	30 September 1970 (aged 28)	Racing de Santander	1997		35	1

== Transfers ==
In: Note: Flags indicate national team as defined under FIFA eligibility rules; some limited exceptions apply. Players may hold more than one non-FIFA nationality.

No.	Pos.	Nation	Player
—	GK	RUS	Vitali Baranov (from (Russia) Zenit Izhevsk)
—	DF	RUS	Aleksandr Borodkin (from (Russia) Tyumen)
—	DF	RUS	Oleg Kornaukhov (from (Russia) Shinnik Yaroslavl)
—	DF	RUS	Aleksandr Shchyogolev (from (Russia) Fakel Voronezh)
—	DF	RUS	Yevgeni Varlamov (from (Russia) KAMAZ)
—	MF	RUS	Sergei Filippenkov (from (Russia) CSK VVS-Kristall Smolensk)
—	MF	RUS	Dmitri Sennikov (from (Russia) Lokomotiv St.Petersburg)
—	MF	UKR	Oleksandr Shutov (loan return from (Ukraine) Chornomorets Odesa)
—	FW	RUS	Aleksei Babenko (from (Russia) KAMAZ)
—	FW	RUS	Aleksandr Gerasimov (from (Russia) Shinnik Yaroslavl)

Out: Note: Flags indicate national team as defined under FIFA eligibility rules; some limited exceptions apply. Players may hold more than one non-FIFA nationality.

No.	Pos.	Nation	Player
—	GK	RUS	Sergey Armishev (to (Russia) Uralan Elista)
—	GK	UKR	Ihor Kutepov (to (Russia) Rostselmash)
—	DF	RUS	Aleksandr Shchyogolev (to (Russia) Fakel Voronezh)
—	DF	AZE	Deni Gaisumov (to (United Arab Emirates) Dubai Club)
—	DF	RUS	Sergei Mamchur (Death)
—	DF	RUS	Denis Pervushin (loan to (Russia) Metallurg Lipetsk)
—	DF	RUS	Denis Pervushin (to (Russia) Sokol Saratov, previously on loan to (Russia) Metallurg Lipetsk)
—	DF	RUS	Pyotr Sedunov (to (Russia) Gazovik-Gazprom Izhevsk)
—	DF	RUS	Vitali Tasenko (to (Russia) Kuban Krasnodar)
—	DF	UKR	Andriy Sydelnykov (to (Ukraine) Dnipro Dnipropetrovsk)
—	MF	RUS	Yevgeny Ageyev (to (Russia) Arsenal Tula)
—	MF	RUS	Dmitri Karsakov (to (Belarus) Slavia Mozyr)
—	MF	RUS	Dmitri Kuznetsov (to (Russia) Arsenal Tula)
—	MF	RUS	Andrei Nikolayev (to (Russia) Krylia Sovetov)
—	MF	RUS	Igor Semshov (to (Russia) Torpedo Moscow)
—	MF	RUS	Dmitri Sennikov (to (Russia) Shinnik Yaroslavl)
—	MF	RUS	Sergey Shustikov (to (Spain) Racing de Santander)
—	FW	RUS	Andrey Movsisyan (to (Russia) Lokomotiv Nizhny Novgorod)

== Competitions ==
=== Top Division ===
==== Results by round ====
Round	1	2	3	4	5	6	7	8	9	10	11	12	13	14	15	16	17	18	19	20	21	22	23	24	25	26	27	28	29	30
Ground	A	H	H	A	H	A	A	H	A	H	A	A	H	A	H	H	A	H	A	H	A	H	A	H	A	H	H	A	H	A
Result	D	L	D	L	D	W	L	W	D	W	L	L	L	D	L	W	W	L	W	W	W	W	W	W	W	W	W	W	W	W

Updated to match(es) played on 30 October 1998. Source: See Results
A = Away; H = Home; W = Win; D = Draw; L = Loss

==== Results ====
28 March 1998 1	Chernomorets Novorossiysk	1 – 1	CSKA Moscow	Novorossiysk
MSK (UTC+4)	Styopushkin (yellow card) 39'; Burdin 80' (pen.)	Report	Gerasimov 5'; Shchyogolev (yellow card) 24'	Stadium: Central Stadium; Referee: I.Siner

4 April 1998 2	CSKA Moscow	1 – 2	Zenit St.Petersburg	Moscow
17:00 MSK (UTC+4)	Varlamov (yellow card) 61'; Semak 81'	Report	Maksymyuk 10'; Horshkov (yellow card) 44'; Herasimets 57'; Curteian (yellow card) 67'; Kondrashov (yellow card) 73'; Babiy (yellow card) 89'	Stadium: Grigory Fedotov Stadium; Referee: Aleksandr Lapin

18 April 1998 4	CSKA Moscow	1 – 1	Dynamo Moscow	Moscow
17:00 MSK (UTC+4)	Filippenkov (yellow card) 55'; Semak 60'; Babenko (yellow card) 65'	Report	Isibor 38'	Stadium: Dynamo Stadium; Referee: A.Kozhukhov

25 April 1998 5	Zhemchuzhina-Sochi	2 – 1	CSKA Moscow	Sochi
MSK (UTC+4)	Zatsepin 15' (pen.) (yellow card) 65'; Gogrichiani 44' (yellow card) 45'; Zhuravel (yellow card) 72'	Report	Khomukha 24' (yellow card) 41'; Shchyogolev (yellow card) 31'; Kornaukhov (yellow card) 58'	Stadium: Sochi Central Stadium; Referee: Nikolai Levnikov

2 May 1998 6	CSKA Moscow	0 – 0	Alania Vladikavkaz	Moscow
17:00 MSK (UTC+4)	Filippenkov (yellow card) 18'; Varlamov (yellow card) 82'	Report	Fyodorov (yellow card) 8' (yellow-red card) 89'; Bitarov (yellow card) 56'; Agayev (yellow card) 62'; Gakhokidze (yellow card) 68'	Stadium: Grigory Fedotov Stadium; Referee: S.Gusev

9 May 1998 7	Uralan Elista	1 – 2	CSKA Moscow	Elista
MSK (UTC+4)	Shukanov (yellow card) 30'; Petrosyants 82'	Report	Shustikov (yellow card) 38'; Varlamov (yellow card) 50'; Semak 56'; Khomukha 65'; Filippenkov (yellow card) 70'; Kulik (yellow card) 88'	Stadium: Uralan Stadium; Referee: V.Yaprintsev

13 May 1998 3	Lokomotiv Moscow	2 – 1	CSKA Moscow	Moscow
19:00 MSK (UTC+4)	Lavrik 25'; Janashia 52' (yellow card) 80'; Kosolapov (yellow card) 74'	Report	Varlamov (yellow card) 51'; Kulik 89'	Stadium: Lokomotiv Stadium; Referee: F.Erzimanov

16 May 1998 8	CSKA Moscow	3 – 0	Krylia Sovetov	Moscow
17:00 MSK (UTC+4)	Kulik 13', 53'; Shchyogolev (yellow card) 27'; Bokov 69'	Report	Shishkin (yellow card) 78'	Stadium: Grigory Fedotov Stadium; Referee: N.Frolov

23 May 1998 9	Baltika Kaliningrad	1 – 1	CSKA Moscow	Kaliningrad
19:00 MSK (UTC+4)	Buitkus 74'; Silin (yellow card) 80'	Report	Bokov (yellow card) 35'; Kulik 38'	Stadium: Baltika Stadium; Referee: Aleksandr Lapin

3 June 1998 10	CSKA Moscow	3 – 1	Tyumen	Moscow
17:00 MSK (UTC+4)	Semak 23'; Kornaukhov 75' (pen.); Kulik 88'	Report	Borodkin (yellow card) 10'; Fishman (yellow card) 20' (yellow-red card) 87'; Klestov (yellow card) 37'; Goncharov 45'; Asadov (yellow card) 80'	Stadium: Grigory Fedotov Stadium; Referee: Nikolai Ivanov

11 June 1998 11	Spartak Moscow	2 – 1	CSKA Moscow	Moscow
18:00 MSK (UTC+4)	Tikhonov 21'; Romaschenko (penalty missed) 27; Tsymbalar 65' (yellow card) 79'	Report	Shchyogolev (yellow card) 16'; Varlamov 32'; Kornaukhov (yellow card) 35'	Stadium: Lokomotiv Stadium; Referee: Nikolai Ivanov

17 June 1998 12	Rostselmash	1 – 0	CSKA Moscow	Rostov-on-Don
19:00 MSK (UTC+4)	Bezsmertnyi 13'; Guschin (yellow card) 49'; Kirichenko (yellow card) 51'; Gradilenko (yellow card) 63'	Report	Minko (yellow card) 82'	Stadium: Olimp-2; Referee: Taras Bezubyak

21 June 1998 13	CSKA Moscow	1 – 3	Torpedo Moscow	Moscow
17:00 MSK (UTC+4)	Bokov (yellow card) 31'; Kulik 38'; Grishin (yellow card) 69'; Novosadov (red card) 89'	Report	Skachenko 18'; Avakov 54'; Bulatov 84'	Stadium: Grigory Fedotov Stadium; Referee: A.Butenko

24 June 1998 14	Rotor Volgograd	0 – 0	CSKA Moscow	Volgograd
MSK (UTC+4)	Krivov (yellow card) 64'	Report	Savelyev (yellow card) 21'; Bokov (yellow card) 53'	Stadium: Central Profsoyuz Stadium; Referee: I.Siner

1 July 1998 15	CSKA Moscow	0 – 1	Shinnik Yaroslavl	Moscow
19:00 MSK (UTC+4)	Tsaplin (yellow card) 39'	Report	Solovtsov (yellow card) 26'; Snytko 84'	Stadium: Grigory Fedotov Stadium; Referee: G.Kulichenkov

15 July 1998 16	CSKA Moscow	4 – 1	Chernomorets Novorossiysk	Moscow
18:00 MSK (UTC+4)	Grishin (yellow card) 28'; Khomukha 33' (yellow card) 54'; Semak 52'; Kornaukhov 79' (pen.); Gerasimov (yellow card) 83'; Shutov 86'	Report	Dyomin (yellow card) 32'; Mayorov (yellow card) 42'; Beradze (yellow card) 49'; Geraschenko (yellow card) 62'	Stadium: Grigory Fedotov Stadium; Referee: N.Frolov

22 July 1998 17	Zenit St.Petersburg	0 – 1	CSKA Moscow	Saint Petersburg
MSK (UTC+4)	Kondrashov (yellow card) 32'; Herasimets (yellow card) 63'; Maksymyuk (red card) 80'	Report	Borodkin (yellow card) 13' (yellow-red card) 88'; Varlamov (yellow card) 56'; Minko 78'; Semak (yellow card) 82'; Kulik (yellow card) 83'	Stadium: Petrovsky Stadium; Referee: I.Siner

29 July 1998 18	CSKA Moscow	0 – 1	Lokomotiv Moscow	Moscow
MSK (UTC+4)	Minko (yellow card) 63'	Report	Arifullin (yellow card) 35'; Lavrik (yellow card) 54'; Haras 77'	Stadium: Grigory Fedotov Stadium; Referee: S.Anokhin

1 August 1998 19	Dynamo Moscow	0 – 3	CSKA Moscow	Moscow
17:00 MSK (UTC+4)	Astrowski (yellow card) 58'	Report	Savelyev 21', 29'; Borodkin (yellow card) 43'; Filippenkov 90'	Stadium: Dynamo Stadium; Referee: Yuri Baskakov

8 August 1998 20	CSKA Moscow	3 – 0	Zhemchuzhina-Sochi	Moscow
18:00 MSK (UTC+4)	Kulik 9', 36' (penalty missed) 51'; Kornaukhov (penalty missed) 68'; Tsaplin (yellow card) 78'; Filippenkov 80'	Report	Bondarev (yellow card) 63'; Bondaruk (red card) 68'; Kovalenko (yellow card) 73'; Kalaydzhan (yellow card) 83'	Stadium: Grigory Fedotov Stadium; Referee: V.Yaprintsev

15 August 1998 21	Alania Vladikavkaz	0 – 1	CSKA Moscow	Vladikavkaz
MSK (UTC+4)	Bazayev (yellow card) 6'; Pagayev (yellow card) 35'	Report	Bokov (yellow card) 37'; Semak 65'	Stadium: Republican Spartak Stadium; Referee: N.Frolov

22 August 1998 22	CSKA Moscow	3 – 0	Uralan Elista	Moscow
17:30 MSK (UTC+4)	Tsaryov 16' (o.g.); Savelyev (yellow card) 53'; Filippenkov 54'; Borodkin (yellow card) 68'; Khomukha 69'; Gerasimov (yellow card) 89'	Report	Smertin (yellow card) 32'; Shukanov (yellow card) 50'; Ivanov (yellow card) 83'; Ivanovs (yellow card) 87'	Stadium: Grigory Fedotov Stadium; Referee: G.Kulichenkov

30 August 1998 23	Krylia Sovetov	0 – 2	CSKA Moscow	Samara
MSK (UTC+4)	Demenko (yellow card) 14'; Safronov (penalty missed) 73'; Shishkin (yellow card) 73'; Mazur (yellow card) 89'	Report	Semak 44'; Tsaplin (yellow card) 63' (goal) 78'; Grishin (yellow card) 65'; Varlamov (yellow card) 73'	Stadium: Metallurg Stadium; Referee: Nikolai Ivanov

9 September 1998 24	CSKA Moscow	2 – 0	Baltika Kaliningrad	Moscow
17:00 MSK (UTC+4)	Kornaukhov 15'; Kulik 29'; Bokov (yellow card) 69'	Report	R.Ajinjal (yellow card) 33'; Gorbachyov (yellow card) 66'	Stadium: Grigory Fedotov Stadium; Referee: Taras Bezubyak

20 September 1998 25	Tyumen	0 – 4	CSKA Moscow	Tyumen
MSK (UTC+4)	Glukhov (yellow card) 42'; Asadov (penalty missed) 54'	Report	Khomukha 48' (pen.); Borodkin 50'; Kulik 56', 83'	Stadium: Geolog Stadium; Referee: G.Kulichenkov

26 September 1998 26	CSKA Moscow	4 – 1	Spartak Moscow	Moscow
17:00 MSK (UTC+4)	Khomukha 16', 87'; Filippenkov 25'; Semak (yellow card) 31'; Kornaukhov (yellow card) 50'; Borodkin 54'; Savelyev (yellow card) 90'	Report	Bushmanov (yellow card) 33'; Khlestov (yellow card) 86'; Robson 90'	Stadium: Dynamo Stadium; Referee: Yuri Baskakov

3 October 1998 27	CSKA Moscow	1 – 0	Rostselmash	Moscow
17:00 MSK (UTC+4)	Kulik 40'; Filippenkov (yellow card) 48'	Report	Prudius (yellow card) 22'; Bezsmertnyi (yellow card) 43'; Khankeyev (yellow card) 52'; Kolotovkin (yellow card) 54'	Stadium: Grigory Fedotov Stadium; Referee: S.Gusev

17 October 1998 28	Torpedo Moscow	0 – 2	CSKA Moscow	Moscow
17:00 MSK (UTC+4)	Mkrtchyan (yellow card) 50'; Mukhamadiev (yellow card) 77'; Bulatov (yellow card) 86'	Report	Grishin (yellow card) 52'; Bokov (yellow card) 62'; Kulik 72'; Semak 78'	Stadium: Eduard Streltsov Stadium; Referee: V.Ovchinnikov

25 October 1998 29	CSKA Moscow	2 – 0	Rotor Volgograd	Moscow
MSK (UTC+4)	Filippenkov 13'; Kulik 44'; Savelyev (yellow card) 64'	Report	Olenikov (yellow card) 2'; Berketov (yellow card) 40'; Shmarko (yellow card) 45'	Stadium: Lokomotiv Stadium; Referee: Nikolai Ivanov

30 October 1998 30	Shinnik Yaroslavl	1 – 2	CSKA Moscow	Yaroslavl
MSK (UTC+3)	Kazalov 39'; Leonchenko (yellow card) 69'	Report	Semak 21'; Grishin (yellow card) 22'; Khomukha 30'	Stadium: Shinnik Stadium; Referee: S.Andreev

==== Table ====
Pos	Team	Pld	W	D	L	GF	GA	GD	Pts	Qualification or relegation
1	Spartak Moscow (C)	30	17	8	5	58	27	+31	59	Qualification to Champions League third qualifying round
2	CSKA Moscow	30	17	5	8	50	22	+28	56	Qualification to Champions League second qualifying round
3	Lokomotiv Moscow	30	16	7	7	45	28	+17	55	Qualification to UEFA Cup qualifying round
4	Rotor Volgograd	30	12	12	6	52	37	+15	48	
5	Zenit St. Petersburg	30	12	11	7	42	25	+17	47	Qualification to UEFA Cup first round

Source: rsssf.com
Rules for classification: 1) points; 2) goal difference; 3) number of goals scored.
(C) Champions

=== Russian Cup ===
==== 1997-98 ====
14 April 1998 Quarterfinal	Rotor Volgograd	5 – 3 (a.e.t.)	CSKA Moscow	Volgograd
MSK (UTC+4)	Veretennikov 55' (pen.), 93', 118' (penalty missed) 80'; Yesipov (yellow card) 75'; Burlachenko 76'; Zubko 95'	Report	Kornaukhov 66'; Kutepov (yellow card) 73'; Kulik 87'; Varlamov 113'	Stadium: Central Stadium; Attendance: 5,000; Referee: Gennadi Kulichenkov

==== 1998-99 ====
12 September 1998 Round of 32	Amur-Energiya Blagoveshchensk	0 – 2	CSKA Moscow	Blagoveshchensk
16:00 MSK (UTC+4)	Vorobiev (yellow card) 55'	Report	Khomukha 13'; Bokov (yellow card) 50'; Kulik 73'	Stadium: Central Amur Stadium; Attendance: 12,000; Referee: Sergei Andreyev

10 November 1998 Round of 16	CSKA Moscow	2 – 1	Tom Tomsk	Moscow
14:00 MSK (UTC+3)	Filippenkov 6'; Varlamov (yellow card) 6'; Kulik 64'	Report	Dolgov (yellow card) 58'; Ageyev 61'; Murashov (yellow card) 77'; V.Konovalov (yellow card) 84'	Stadium: Grigory Fedotov Stadium; Attendance: 1,500; Referee: Nikolai Levnikov

The Quarterfinal took place during the 1999 season.

== Squad statistics ==
As of match played 10 November 1998

=== Appearances and goals ===
No.	Pos	Nat	Player	Total		Top Division		1997–98 Russian Cup		1998–99 Russian Cup	
No.	Pos	Nat	Player	Apps	Goals	Apps	Goals	Apps	Goals	Apps	Goals
	GK	(Russia) RUS	Andrei Novosadov	22	0	20	0	0	0	2	0
	DF	(Russia) RUS	Maksim Bokov	30	1	26+1	1	1	0	2	0
	DF	(Russia) RUS	Aleksandr Borodkin	14	2	11+2	2	0	0	1	0
	DF	(Russia) RUS	Vladimir Isakov	1	0	0+1	0	0	0	0	0
	DF	(Russia) RUS	Oleg Kornaukhov	31	4	27+1	3	1	1	2	0
	DF	(Russia) RUS	Valeri Minko	28	1	22+3	1	1	0	2	0
	DF	(Russia) RUS	Andrei Tsaplin	18	1	16	1	0	0	1+1	0
	DF	(Russia) RUS	Yevgeni Varlamov	32	2	29	1	1	1	2	0
	MF	(Russia) RUS	Sergei Filippenkov	30	6	21+6	5	1	0	2	1
	MF	(Russia) RUS	Aleksandr Grishin	30	0	21+6	0	1	0	1+1	0
	MF	(Russia) RUS	Aleksei Savelyev	23	2	4+16	2	0+1	0	1+1	0
	MF	(Russia) RUS	Sergei Semak	32	9	29	9	1	0	2	0
	MF	(Turkmenistan) TKM	Dmitri Khomukha	32	9	29+1	8	0	0	2	1
	MF	(Ukraine) UKR	Oleksandr Shutov	10	1	1+8	1	0	0	0+1	0
	FW	(Russia) RUS	Aleksei Babenko	12	0	4+7	0	1	0	0	0
	FW	(Russia) RUS	Aleksandr Gerasimov	25	1	12+12	1	1	0	0	0
	FW	(Russia) RUS	Sergey Korovushkin	4	0	0+4	0	0	0	0	0
	FW	(Russia) RUS	Vladimir Kulik	33	17	27+3	14	0+1	1	2	2
Players out on loan:
Players who left CSKA Moscow during the season:
	GK	(Ukraine) UKR	Ihor Kutepov	12	0	10	0	1	0	0+1	0
	DF	(Russia) RUS	Aleksandr Shchyogolev	10	0	9	0	0+1	0	0	0
	MF	(Russia) RUS	Dmitri Kuznetsov	10	0	4+6	0	0	0	0	0
	MF	(Russia) RUS	Dmitri Sennikov	7	0	1+6	0	0	0	0	0
	MF	(Russia) RUS	Sergey Shustikov	7	0	4+2	0	1	0	0	0

=== Goal Scorers ===
Place	Position	Nation	Name	Top Division	1997–98 Russian Cup	1998–99 Russian Cup	Total
1	FW	(Russia)	Vladimir Kulik	14	1	2	17
2	MF	(Russia)	Sergei Semak	9	0	0	9
2	MF	(Turkmenistan)	Dmitri Khomukha	8	0	1	9
4	MF	(Russia)	Sergei Filippenkov	5	0	1	6
5	DF	(Russia)	Oleg Kornaukhov	3	1	0	4
6	MF	(Russia)	Aleksei Savelyev	2	0	0	2
6	DF	(Russia)	Aleksandr Borodkin	2	0	0	2
6	DF	(Russia)	Yevgeni Varlamov	1	1	0	2
9	FW	(Russia)	Aleksandr Gerasimov	1	0	0	1
9	DF	(Russia)	Maksim Bokov	1	0	0	1
9	MF	(Ukraine)	Oleksandr Shutov	1	0	0	1
9	DF	(Russia)	Valeri Minko	1	0	0	1
9	DF	(Russia)	Andrei Tsaplin	1	0	0	1
9			Own goal	1	0	0	1
			TOTALS	50	3	4	57

=== Disciplinary record ===
Nation	Position	Name	Top Division		1997–98 Russian Cup		1998–99 Russian Cup		Total	
Nation	Position	Name	Booked	Sent off (straight red)	Booked	Sent off (straight red)	Booked	Sent off (straight red)	Booked	Sent off (straight red)
(Russia)	GK	Andrei Novosadov	0	1	0	0	0	0	0	1
(Russia)	DF	Maksim Bokov	6	0	0	0	1	0	7	0
(Russia)	DF	Aleksandr Borodkin	4	1	0	0	0	0	4	1
(Russia)	DF	Oleg Kornaukhov	3	0	0	0	0	0	3	0
(Russia)	DF	Valeri Minko	2	0	0	0	0	0	2	0
(Russia)	DF	Andrei Tsaplin	3	0	0	0	0	0	3	0
(Russia)	DF	Yevgeni Varlamov	6	0	0	0	1	0	7	0
(Russia)	MF	Sergei Filippenkov	4	0	0	0	0	0	4	0
(Russia)	MF	Aleksandr Grishin	5	0	0	0	0	0	5	0
(Russia)	MF	Aleksei Savelyev	4	0	0	0	0	0	4	0
(Russia)	MF	Sergei Semak	2	0	0	0	0	0	2	0
(Turkmenistan)	MF	Dmitri Khomukha	2	0	0	0	0	0	2	0
(Russia)	FW	Aleksei Babenko	1	0	0	0	0	0	1	0
(Russia)	FW	Aleksandr Gerasimov	2	0	0	0	0	0	2	0
(Russia)	FW	Vladimir Kulik	2	0	0	0	0	0	2	0
Players out on loan :
Players who left CSKA Moscow during the season:
(Ukraine)	GK	Ihor Kutepov	0	0	1	0	0	0	1	0
(Russia)	DF	Aleksandr Shchyogolev	4	0	0	0	0	0	4	0
(Russia)	MF	Sergey Shustikov	1	0	0	0	0	0	1	0
		TOTALS	51	2	1	0	2	0	54	2
