= 1998–99 Russian Cup =

Tournament details
- Country: Russia

Final positions
- Champions: Zenit Saint Petersburg
- Runners-up: Dynamo Moscow

The 1998–99 Russian Cup was the seventh season of the Russian football knockout tournament since the dissolution of Soviet Union.

Andrey Kobelev played for both eventual finalists during the tournament, captaining Dynamo Moscow in their Round of 16 game against Alania Vladikavkaz and then transferring to Zenit Saint Petersburg in the winter and coming on as a substitute for Zenit in the final.

== First round ==
Team 1	Score	Team 2
8 May 1998
Iriston Vladikavkaz	2–3 (a.e.t.)	Avtodor Vladikavkaz
FC Mozdok	1–0	Kavkazkabel Prokhladny
Beshtau Lermontov	w/o	Avtozapchast Baksan
Volgar-Gazprom Astrakhan	2–0	Dynamo Makhachkala
Lokomotiv-Taym Mineralnye Vody	2–3	Torpedo Georgiyevsk
Nart Nartkala	3–2	Angusht Nazran
Kuban Slavyansk-na-Kubani	w/o	Niva Slavyansk-na-Kubani
Metallurg Krasny Sulin	w/o	Torpedo Taganrog
Shakhtyor Shakhty	2–1	Venets Gulkevichi
Nart Cherkessk	0–1	Torpedo Armavir

== Second round ==
Team 1	Score	Team 2
26 May 1998
Avangard Kursk	0–1	FC Oryol
Don Novomoskovsk	1–0	Fakel Voronezh
Krasnogvardeyets Moscow	w/o	Arsenal Tula
Asmaral Moscow	1–1 (a.e.t.) (4–2 p)	Lokomotiv Liski
Spartak Bryansk	1–0	Salyut-YuKOS Belgorod
Arsenal-2 Tula	0–2	Metallurg Lipetsk
Gigant Voskresensk	w/o	Dynamo Bryansk
Spartak Lukhovitsy	1–3	Spartak Ryazan
FC Kolomna	1–6	Saturn Ramenskoye
Torgmash Lyubertsy	0–2	Spartak-Orekhovo
Titan Reutov	1–3	Kristall Smolensk
Stroitel Morshansk	2–1	Spartak Tambov
Selenga Ulan-Ude	2–1	Lokomotiv Chita
Gornyak Raychikhinsk	w/o	Amur-Energiya Blagoveshchensk
Angara Angarsk	w/o	SKA Khabarovsk
Luch Vladivostok	2–1	Okean Nakhodka
Sibiryak Bratsk	2–1 (a.e.t.)	Zvezda Irkutsk
Metallurg Krasnoyarsk	1–0	Viktoriya Nazarovo
FC Mezhdurechensk	0–2	Metallurg Novokuznetsk
Kuzbass Kemerovo	0–3	Tom Tomsk
Chkalovets Novosibirsk	2–1 (a.e.t.)	Zarya Leninsk-Kuznetsky
Torpedo Rubtsovsk	3–2	Dynamo Barnaul
27 May 1998
Avtodor Vladikavkaz	2–0	Spartak Nalchik
Beshtau Lermontov	1–2	FC Mozdok
Torpedo Georgiyevsk	1–2	Volgar-Gazprom Astrakhan
Anzhi Makhachkala	7–0	Nart Nartkala
Kuban Slavyansk-na-Kubani	1–4	Druzhba Maykop
Kuban Krasnodar	2–0 (a.e.t.)	FC Anapa
Torpedo Taganrog	2–1	Shakhtyor Shakhty
Torpedo Armavir	0–3	Dynamo Stavropol
Lokomotiv Kaluga	4–1 (a.e.t.)	FC Krasnoznamensk-Selyatino
Volochanin Vyshny Volochyok	0–0 (a.e.t.) (2–4 p)	Lokomotiv Saint Petersburg
Neftyanik Yaroslavl	3–1	Dynamo Vologda
Monolit Moscow	0–5	Torpedo-ZIL Moscow
Sportakademklub Moscow	2–1	FC Khimki
FC Pskov	0–1	Dynamo Saint Petersburg
Energiya Velikiye Luki	3–2	Volga Tver
Fabus Bronnitsy	0–3	Spartak Shchyolkovo
Kosmos Dolgoprudny	1–1 (a.e.t.) (6–5 p)	Avtomobilist Noginsk
Spartak Kostroma	3–3 (a.e.t.) (4–2 p)	Tekstilshchik Ivanovo
Spartak-Telekom Shuya	1–1 (a.e.t.) (4–3 p)	Torpedo-Viktoriya Nizhny Novgorod
Torpedo Vladimir	3–2	Mosenergo Moscow
Khimik Dzerzhinsk	0–3	Torpedo Pavlovo
Energiya Uren	1–0	Lokomotiv Nizhny Novgorod
Biokhimik-Mordovia Saransk	2–1	Torpedo Arzamas
Progress Zelenodolsk	1–0	Neftekhimik Nizhnekamsk
Druzhba Yoshkar-Ola	0–1	Rubin Kazan
Neftyanik Pokhvistnevo	1–0	Lada-Togliatti-VAZ Togliatti
Salyut Saratov	2–1	Torpedo Volzhsky
Iskra Engels	3–3 (a.e.t.) (1–4 p)	Rotor Kamyshin
FC Balakovo	1–3	Sokol Saratov
Energiya Ulyanovsk	1–3	Lada-Grad Dimitrovgrad
Diana Volzhsk	4–0	Volga Ulyanovsk
Zenit Penza	1–0	Svetotekhnika Saransk
Dynamo Perm	0–4	Amkar Perm
Zenit Izhevsk	1–2	Gazovik-Gazprom Izhevsk
Gazovik Orenburg	0–4	Sodovik Sterlitamak
Energiya Chaykovsky	1–0 (a.e.t.)	KAMAZ-Chally Naberezhnye Chelny
Irtysh Tobolsk	1–0	Samotlor-XXI Nizhnevartovsk
Dynamo Omsk	1–0	Irtysh Omsk
Uralets Nizhny Tagil	0–0 (a.e.t.) (5–6 p)	Uralmash Yekaterinburg
Trubnik Kamensk-Uralsky	2–0	Sibir Kurgan
Zenit Chelyabinsk	2–1	UralAZ Miass
Magnitka Magnitogorsk	1–2	Nosta Novotroitsk

== Third round ==
Team 1	Score	Team 2
6 July 1998
FC Mozdok	0–1	Avtodor Vladikavkaz
Volgar-Gazprom Astrakhan	1–2	Anzhi Makhachkala
Druzhba Maykop	3–0	Kuban Krasnodar
Dynamo Stavropol	1–0	Torpedo Taganrog
FC Oryol	4–0	Lokomotiv Kaluga
Arsenal Tula	2–1	Don Novomoskovsk
Spartak Bryansk	3–4	Asmaral Moscow
Metallurg Lipetsk	8–1	Dynamo Bryansk
Lokomotiv Saint Petersburg	2–1 (a.e.t.)	Neftyanik Yaroslavl
Torpedo-ZIL Moscow	4–0	Sportakademklub Moscow
Dynamo Saint Petersburg	3–2 (a.e.t.)	Energiya Velikiye Luki
Spartak Ryazan	4–2	Spartak Shchyolkovo
Saturn Ramenskoye	1–0	Kosmos Dolgoprudny
Spartak-Telekom Shuya	2–0	Spartak Kostroma
Torpedo Pavlovo	2–3	Torpedo Vladimir
Spartak-Orekhovo	1–0 (a.e.t.)	Kristall Smolensk
Energiya Uren	2–0	Biokhimik-Mordovia Saransk
Rubin Kazan	2–0	Progress Zelenodolsk
Neftyanik Pokhvistnevo	3–1	Salyut Saratov
Lada-Grad Dimitrovgrad	3–1	Diana Volzhsk
Rotor Kamyshin	w/o	Sokol Saratov
Zenit Penza	2–2 (a.e.t.) (4–3 p)	Stroitel Morshansk
Amkar Perm	2–1	Gazovik-Gazprom Izhevsk
Sodovik Sterlitamak	0–2	Energiya Chaykovsky
Amur-Energiya Blagoveshchensk	3–0	Selenga Ulan-Ude
SKA Khabarovsk	1–0	Luch Vladivostok
Metallurg Krasnoyarsk	5–0	Sibiryak Bratsk
Tom Tomsk	2–0	Metallurg Novokuznetsk
Torpedo Rubtsovsk	3–4	Chkalovets Novosibirsk
Dynamo Omsk	2–1	Irtysh Tobolsk
Uralmash Yekaterinburg	7–0	Trubnik Kamensk-Uralsky
Nosta Novotroitsk	3–0	Zenit Chelyabinsk

== Fourth round ==
Team 1	Score	Team 2
22 July 1998
Avtodor Vladikavkaz	3–1	Anzhi Makhachkala
Druzhba Maykop	1–0 (a.e.t.)	Dynamo Stavropol
FC Oryol	1–3	Arsenal Tula
Metallurg Lipetsk	4–0	Asmaral Moscow
Torpedo-ZIL Moscow	2–1	Lokomotiv Saint Petersburg
Dynamo Saint Petersburg	2–1	Spartak Ryazan
Saturn Ramenskoye	3–1 (a.e.t.)	Spartak-Telekom Shuya
Torpedo Vladimir	1–2 (a.e.t.)	Spartak-Orekhovo
Rubin Kazan	2–3 (a.e.t.)	Energiya Uren
Sokol Saratov	1–0	Neftyanik Pokhvistnevo
Lada-Grad Dimitrovgrad	2–0	Zenit Penza
Amkar Perm	2–1 (a.e.t.)	Energiya Chaykovsky
Amur-Energiya Blagoveshchensk	1–0	SKA Khabarovsk
Tom Tomsk	1–0	Metallurg Krasnoyarsk
Chkalovets Novosibirsk	4–1	Dynamo Omsk
Nosta Novotroitsk	4–3	Uralmash Yekaterinburg

== Round of 32 ==
Russian Premier League teams started at this stage.

11 September 1998	Torpedo-ZIL Moscow	0–7	Dynamo Moscow	Moscow
			Danilevičius 6', 24'; Isibor 26', 40', 45'; Skokov 41'; Gordeyev 69'	Stadium: Eduard Streltsov Stadium; Attendance: 4,000; Referee: Vladimir Ovchinnikov (Moscow)

12 September 1998	Avtodor Vladikavkaz	2–1 (a.e.t.)	Krylia Sovetov Samara	Vladikavkaz
	Tskhovrebov 28' (pen.); Tazabayev 108'		Nikulin 53'	Stadium: Dynamo Stadium; Attendance: 4,000; Referee: Yuri Tikhomirov (Moscow)

12 September 1998	Druzhba Maykop	1–3	Rotor Volgograd	Maykop
	Voronin 21'		Veretennikov 27', 78' (pen.); Olenikov 60'	Stadium: City Stadium; Attendance: 12,000; Referee: Sergei Gusev (Tobolsk)

12 September 1998	Arsenal Tula	1–0	Torpedo Moscow	Tula
	Daniel 85'			Stadium: Arsenal Stadium; Attendance: 16,000; Referee: Nikolai Levnikov (Saint Petersburg)

12 September 1998	Metallurg Lipetsk	2–2 (4–3 p)	Lokomotiv Moscow	Lipetsk
	Trkulja 98' (yellow card) 79' (yellow-red card) 110'; Yakunin 118'		Arifullin 110'; Bulykin 120'	Stadium: Metallurg Stadium; Attendance: 14,500; Referee: Nikolai Ivanov (Saint Petersburg)
	Penalties
	Polstyanov (penalty scored); Oskolkov (penalty scored); Yakunin (penalty scored); Rastegayev (penalty missed); Mayboroda (penalty scored)		(penalty missed) Lavrik; (penalty scored) Borodyuk; (penalty scored) Chugainov; (penalty scored) Sarkisyan; (penalty missed) Kharlachyov

12 September 1998	Dynamo Saint Petersburg	0–1 (a.e.t.)	Alania Vladikavkaz	Saint Petersburg
			Žutautas 100'	Stadium: Kirov Stadium; Attendance: 10,700; Referee: Garyafi Zhafyarov (Moscow)

12 September 1998	Saturn Ramenskoye	1–0	Chernomorets Novorossiysk	Ramenskoye
	S. Varfolomeyev 80'			Stadium: Saturn Stadium; Attendance: 10,000; Referee: Gennadi Kulichenkov (Tula)

12 September 1998	Spartak-Orekhovo	3–0	FC Tyumen	Orekhovo-Zuyevo
	Medvedev 27'; Sukhov 51', 72'			Stadium: Znamya Truda Stadium; Attendance: 5,500; Referee: Aleksandr Kozhukhov (Moscow)

12 September 1998	Energiya Uren	1–2 (a.e.t.)	Zhemchuzhina Sochi	Uren
	Lychagov 52'; Poletayev (red card) 43'		Mendes 11'; Kovalenko 95'; Kuznetsov (red card) 43'	Stadium: Energetik Stadium; Attendance: 5,500; Referee: Sergei Anokhin (Moscow)

12 September 1998	Sokol Saratov	2–2 (1–4 p)	Zenit Saint Petersburg	Saratov
	Lebed 10', 16' (pen.)		Babiy 87'; Maksymyuk 90'	Stadium: Lokomotiv Stadium; Attendance: 14,500; Referee: Lom-Ali Ibragimov (Grozny)
	Penalties
	Zayarnyi (penalty missed); Yermilov (penalty scored); Musin (penalty missed)		(penalty scored) Curtianu; (penalty scored) Babiy; (penalty scored) Popovych; (penalty scored) Kulkov

12 September 1998	Lada-Grad Dimitrovgrad	0–1	Rostselmash Rostov-on-Don	Dimitrovgrad
			Khankeyev 80'	Stadium: Torpedo Stadium; Attendance: 4,500; Referee: Nikolai Frolov (Ramenskoye)

12 September 1998	Amkar Perm	1–0	Spartak Moscow	Perm
	Benedsky 84'			Stadium: Zvezda Stadium; Attendance: 25,000; Referee: Igor Siner (Omsk)

12 September 1998	Amur-Energiya Blagoveshchensk	0–2	CSKA Moscow	Blagoveshchensk
			Khomukha 13'; Kulik 73'	Stadium: Central Amur Stadium; Attendance: 12,000; Referee: Sergei Andreyev (Novosibirsk)

12 September 1998	Tom Tomsk	1–0	Uralan Elista	Tomsk
	G. Grishin 45'			Stadium: Trud Stadium; Attendance: 11,000; Referee: Valentin Ivanov (Moscow)

12 September 1998	Chkalovets Novosibirsk	0–0 (2–4 p)	Shinnik Yaroslavl	Novosibirsk
				Stadium: Spartak Stadium; Attendance: 12,000; Referee: Mikhail Veselovskiy (Moscow)
	Penalties
	Britkin (penalty missed); Martynov (penalty missed); Tsikarishvili (penalty scored); Yarkin (penalty scored)		(penalty scored) Leonchenko; (penalty scored) Makhmutov; (penalty scored) Novgorodov; (penalty scored) Yuminov

12 September 1998	Nosta Novotroitsk	2–1	Baltika Kaliningrad	Novotroitsk
	Datsishin 11'; Filippov 57'		R. Ajinjal 75'	Stadium: Metallurg Stadium; Attendance: 13,000; Referee: Andrei Butenko (Moscow)

== Round of 16 ==
6 November 1998	Shinnik Yaroslavl	2–1 (a.e.t.)	Nosta Novotroitsk	Yaroslavl
	Serebrennikov 50'; Bychkov 104'		Filippov 80'	Stadium: Shinnik Stadium; Attendance: 1,900; Referee: Nikolai Frolov (Ramenskoye)

7 November 1998	Zhemchuzhina Sochi	1–4	Zenit Saint Petersburg	Sochi
	Gogrichiani 51'; Geladze (red card) 21'; Kutarba (red card) 85'		Curtianu 22' (pen.); Panov 37'; Gorshkov 65'; Maksymyuk 89'; Igonin (red card) 32'; Babiy (red card) 85'	Stadium: Sochi Central Stadium; Attendance: 3,000; Referee: Lom-Ali Ibragimov (Grozny)

8 November 1998	Rostselmash Rostov-on-Don	1–0	Amkar Perm	Rostov-on-Don
	Kirichenko 33'			Stadium: Rostselmash Stadium; Attendance: 8,000; Referee: Aleksandr Kozhukhov (Moscow)

10 November 1998	Rotor Volgograd	3–3 (4–2 p)	Avtodor Vladikavkaz	Volgograd
	Bakharev 15' (red card) 45'; Veretennikov 50' (pen.); Smirnov 60'		Dulayev 49'; Tskhovrebov 81'; Perederiy 90'	Stadium: Central Stadium; Attendance: 9,000; Referee: Garyafi Zhafyarov (Moscow)
	Penalties
	Tishchenko (penalty scored); Yesipov (penalty scored); Durov (penalty scored); Berketov (penalty missed); Veretennikov (penalty scored)		(penalty scored) Torchinov; (penalty scored) Perederiy; (penalty missed) Khuazhev; (penalty missed) Tskhovrebov

10 November 1998	Arsenal Tula	4–1	Metallurg Lipetsk	Tula
	Daniel 30'; Andradina 65', 80', 89'		Polstyanov 20'	Stadium: Arsenal Stadium; Attendance: 14,000; Referee: Vladimir Ovchinnikov (Moscow)

10 November 1998	Dynamo Moscow	1–0	Alania Vladikavkaz	Moscow
	Teryokhin 79'			Stadium: Dynamo Stadium; Attendance: 4,300; Referee: Nikolai Ivanov (Saint Petersburg)

10 November 1998	Spartak-Orekhovo	0–0 (2–4 p)	Saturn Ramenskoye	Orekhovo-Zuyevo
				Stadium: Znamya Truda Stadium; Attendance: 6,000; Referee: Yuri Tikhomirov (Moscow)
	Penalties
	Redko (penalty scored); Shapkin (penalty missed); Salnikov (penalty scored); Sukhov (penalty missed)		(penalty scored) Gryazin; (penalty scored) Afanasyev; (penalty scored) Zhidkov; (penalty scored) S. Varfolomeyev

10 November 1998	CSKA Moscow	2–1	Tom Tomsk	Moscow
	Filippenkov 6'; Kulik 64'		Ageyev 61'	Stadium: Peschanoye Stadium; Attendance: 1,500; Referee: Nikolai Levnikov (Saint Petersburg)

== Quarter-finals ==
6 April 1999	CSKA Moscow	1–0	Shinnik Yaroslavl	Moscow
	Varlamov 31'			Stadium: Peschanoye Stadium; Attendance: 3,500; Referee: Yuri Chebotaryov (Krasnodar)

7 April 1999	Rotor Volgograd	4–1	Arsenal Tula	Volgograd
	Yesipov 5'; Zubko 67', 89'; Veretennikov 78'		Pryzetko 86'	Stadium: Central Stadium; Attendance: 10,000; Referee: Garyafi Zhafyarov (Moscow)

7 April 1999	Dynamo Moscow	1–0 (a.e.t.)	Saturn Ramenskoye	Moscow
	Romaschenko 100'			Stadium: Dynamo Stadium; Attendance: 7,500; Referee: Gennadi Yarygin (Yoshkar-Ola)

7 April 1999	Zenit Saint Petersburg	2–0	Rostselmash Rostov-on-Don	Saint Petersburg
	Zazulin 36'; Popovych 43'; Kondrashov (red card) 41'			Stadium: Petrovsky Stadium; Attendance: 12,126; Referee: Nikolai Frolov (Ramenskoye)

== Semi-finals ==
21 April 1999	Rotor Volgograd	2–2 (6–7 p)	Dynamo Moscow	Volgograd
	Zernov 15'; Zubko 56'		Gusev 29'; Klyuev 50'	Stadium: Central Stadium; Attendance: 7,000; Referee: Sergei Andreyev (Novosibirsk)
	Penalties
	Tishchenko (penalty scored); Osinov (penalty scored); Berketov (penalty missed); Abramov (penalty scored); Veretennikov (penalty scored); Shmarko (penalty scored); Olenikov (penalty scored); Borodin (penalty missed)		(penalty scored) Teryokhin; (penalty scored) Gusev; (penalty scored) Klyuev; (penalty scored) Golovskoy; (penalty missed) Radimov; (penalty scored) Ostrovskiy; (penalty scored) S. Grishin; (penalty scored) Isibor

21 April 1999	Zenit Saint Petersburg	1–0	CSKA Moscow	Saint Petersburg
	Popovych 77'			Stadium: Petrovsky Stadium; Attendance: 21,300; Referee: Sergei Gusev (Tobolsk)

== Final ==
25 May 1999

Zenit Saint Petersburg	3–1	Dynamo Moscow
Panov 55', 58'; Maksymyuk 66'		Pisarev 23'; Ostrovskiy (red card) 89'

Luzhniki Stadium, Moscow
Attendance: 22,000
Referee: Nikolai Frolov (Ramenskoye)

FC Zenit Saint Petersburg	FC Dynamo Moscow

FC Zenit Saint Petersburg:
GK	(Armenia) Roman Berezovsky
DF	(Ukraine) Oleksandr Babiy
DF	(Russia) Andrei Kondrashov
DF	(Armenia) Sargis Hovsepyan
DF	(Russia) Aleksei Igonin
DF	(Ukraine) Yuriy Vernydub (captain)
DF	(Russia) Konstantin Lepyokhin
MF	(Russia) Aleksandr Gorshkov
FW	(Ukraine) Hennadiy Popovych (substituted off) 69'
FW	(Ukraine) Roman Maksymyuk (substituted off) 76'
FW	(Russia) Aleksandr Panov
Substitutes:
MF	(Russia) Igor Zazulin (substituted on) 69'
MF	(Russia) Andrey Kobelev (substituted on) 76'
GK	(Russia) Vyacheslav Malafeev
MF	(Russia) Sergei Osipov
MF	(Russia) Denis Ugarov
MF	(Belarus) Syarhyey Hyerasimets
FW	(Belarus) Barys Haravoy
Manager:
(Russia) Anatoli Davydov

FC Dynamo Moscow:
GK	(Russia) Yevgeni Plotnikov
MF	(Russia) Denis Klyuyev (captain)
DF	(Belarus) Andrei Ostrovskiy
DF	(Russia) Aleksandr Tochilin
DF	(Russia) Konstantin Golovskoy
MF	(Russia) Vladislav Radimov
MF	(Russia) Sergey Grishin (substituted off) 63'
MF	(Russia) Rolan Gusev
FW	(Russia) Nikolai Pisarev (substituted off) 53'
MF	(Belarus) Maksim Romaschenko
FW	(Russia) Oleg Teryokhin
Substitutes:
MF	(Belarus) Aliaksandr Kulchiy (substituted on) 53'
FW	(Nigeria) Lucky Isibor (substituted on) 63'
GK	(Russia) Andrei Samorukov
DF	(Russia) Andrei Bulatov
DF	(Russia) Vsevolod Zhuravlyov
FW	(Russia) Roman Kagazezhev
FW	(Moldova) Alexandru Popovici
Manager:
(Russia) Georgi Yartsev

MATCH RULES

- 90 minutes.
- 30 minutes of extra-time if necessary.
- Penalty shootout if scores still level.
- Seven named substitutes
- Maximum of 3 substitutions.

Played in the earlier stages, but not on the final game roster:

FC Zenit Saint Petersburg: Dmitri Davydov (DF), Vasili Kulkov (DF), Alexandru Curtianu (Moldova) (MF), Oleg Dmitriyev (MF), Serghei Cleşcenco (Moldova) (FW), Aleksandr Petukhov (FW).

FC Dynamo Moscow: Dmitriy Kramarenko (Azerbaijan) (GK), Dmytro Tyapushkin (Ukraine) (GK), Deividas Šemberas (Lithuania) (DF), Erik Yakhimovich (Belarus) (DF), Aleksei Kozlov (DF), Yevgeni Korablyov (DF), Maksim Povorov (DF), Sergei Shtanyuk (Belarus) (DF), Sergei Nekrasov (DF), Andrei Gordeyev (MF), Vladimir Skokov (MF), Andrey Kobelev (MF), Tomas Danilevičius (Lithuania) (FW).
