= 1998 Russian Top Division =

7th season of top-tier football league in Russia

Russian Top Division
- Season: 1998

Spartak Moscow won their third consecutive Russian title, and sixth overall.

== Overview ==
Team	Head coach
FC Spartak Moscow	Oleg Romantsev
PFC CSKA Moscow	Pavel Sadyrin (until July); Oleg Dolmatov (from July)
FC Lokomotiv Moscow	Yuri Syomin
FC Rotor Volgograd	Viktor Prokopenko (Ukraine)
FC Zenit St. Petersburg	Anatoliy Byshovets (Ukraine) (until September); Anatoli Davydov (caretaker, from September)
FC Rostselmash Rostov-on-Don	Sergey Andreyev
FC Uralan Elista	Vitaliy Shevchenko
FC Alania Vladikavkaz	Valery Gazzaev
FC Dynamo Moscow	Adamas Golodets (until June); Georgi Yartsev (from June)
FC Chernomorets Novorossiysk	Oleg Dolmatov (until July); Sergei Butenko (from July)
FC Torpedo Moscow	Aleksandr Tarkhanov (until May); Valentin Ivanov (from May)
FC Krylia Sovetov Samara	Aleksandr Averyanov
FC Zhemchuzhina Sochi	Anatoly Baidachny
FC Shinnik Yaroslavl	Pyotr Shubin (until May); David Kipiani (Georgia (country)) (from May)
FC Baltika Kaliningrad	Leonid Tkachenko
FC Tyumen	Aleksandr Ignatenko

== Standings ==
Pos	Team	Pld	W	D	L	GF	GA	GD	Pts	Qualification or relegation
1	Spartak Moscow (C)	30	17	8	5	58	27	+31	59	Qualification to Champions League third qualifying round
2	CSKA Moscow	30	17	5	8	50	22	+28	56	Qualification to Champions League second qualifying round
3	Lokomotiv Moscow	30	16	7	7	45	28	+17	55	Qualification to UEFA Cup qualifying round
4	Rotor Volgograd	30	12	12	6	52	37	+15	48	
5	Zenit St. Petersburg	30	12	11	7	42	25	+17	47	Qualification to UEFA Cup first round
6	Rostselmash	30	11	11	8	42	38	+4	44	Qualification to Intertoto Cup second round
7	Uralan Elista	30	12	6	12	39	41	−2	42	
8	Alania Vladikavkaz	30	11	7	12	46	39	+7	40	
9	Dynamo Moscow	30	8	15	7	31	30	+1	39	
10	Chernomorets Novorossiysk	30	9	11	10	38	38	0	38	
11	Torpedo Moscow (Note: FC Torpedo-Luzhniki Moscow renamed to FC Torpedo)	30	9	10	11	38	34	+4	37	
12	Krylia Sovetov Samara	30	9	8	13	25	37	−12	35	
13	Zhemchuzhina Sochi	30	9	8	13	31	48	−17	35	
14	Shinnik Yaroslavl	30	9	8	13	30	40	−10	35	
15	Baltika Kaliningrad (R)	30	7	11	12	32	43	−11	32	Relegation to First Division
16	Tyumen (Note: FC Dynamo-Gazovik Tyumen renamed to FC Tyumen) (R)	30	2	2	26	17	89	−72	8	Relegation to First Division

Source: rsssf.com
Rules for classification: 1) points; 2) goal difference; 3) number of goals scored.
(C) Champions; (R) Relegated

== Results ==
Home \ Away	ALA	BAL	CHE	CSK	DYN	KRY	LOK	ROS	ROT	SHI	SPA	TOR	TYU	URE	ZEN	ZHE
Alania Vladikavkaz		2–0	3–1	0–1	2–2	5–0	1–2	0–1	3–1	1–2	2–1	0–2	6–0	1–0	0–0	3–0
Baltika Kaliningrad	1–3		1–0	1–1	0–2	1–1	0–3	3–0	2–2	3–1	1–1	0–0	2–0	1–1	3–2	2–1
Chernomorets Novorossiysk	1–2	2–1		1–1	1–1	4–0	1–2	1–1	1–1	2–1	3–1	1–1	4–1	2–0	0–0	0–0
CSKA Moscow	0–0	2–0	4–1		1–1	3–0	0–1	1–0	2–0	0–1	4–1	1–3	3–1	3–0	1–2	3–0
Dynamo Moscow	4–1	1–1	0–0	0–3		1–1	2–1	1–2	2–2	1–1	0–0	0–0	1–0	0–3	0–0	4–1
Krylia Sovetov Samara	2–2	0–0	3–0	0–2	1–0		1–3	1–0	0–0	1–0	0–2	2–0	1–0	2–0	1–2	0–0
Lokomotiv Moscow	0–0	2–0	1–1	2–1	1–0	1–0		1–1	0–1	0–0	0–2	2–0	4–0	3–1	3–1	4–3
Rostselmash	1–0	0–1	3–2	1–0	0–0	3–0	2–2		2–2	3–2	3–3	2–3	4–0	0–0	1–1	2–0
Rotor Volgograd	1–1	1–1	3–0	0–0	0–0	2–1	3–2	5–1		6–2	1–2	1–0	5–1	3–1	2–1	0–0
Shinnik Yaroslavl	3–2	3–1	0–0	1–2	0–2	0–0	0–1	0–0	2–0		0–1	1–0	3–2	0–0	0–0	1–2
Spartak Moscow	3–1	3–0	1–0	2–1	2–0	2–2	2–0	1–1	3–1	3–1		1–0	7–0	1–0	0–0	1–1
Torpedo Moscow	2–0	0–0	2–3	0–2	2–2	1–0	0–0	3–1	2–2	0–1	1–1		5–1	1–1	1–3	0–1
Tyumen	0–2	3–2	0–3	0–4	2–0	0–3	0–2	1–4	2–4	0–1	0–6	1–2		1–3	0–5	0–1
Uralan Elista	3–3	2–1	1–1	1–2	0–1	1–0	1–0	1–3	2–1	2–1	1–0	3–2	2–1		0–3	2–0
Zenit St. Petersburg	2–0	2–2	0–1	0–1	1–1	2–0	2–2	3–0	0–1	3–0	2–1	1–1	0–0	2–1		1–0
Zhemchuzhina Sochi	3–0	2–1	3–1	2–1	1–2	0–2	2–0	0–0	1–1	2–2	1–4	0–4	0–0	2–6	2–1	

Legend: Blue = home team win; Yellow = draw; Red = away team win.

== Season statistics ==
=== Top goalscorers ===
As of matches played on 30 October 1998.

Rank	Player	Club	Goals
1	(Russia) Oleg Veretennikov	Rotor	22
2	(Georgia (country)) Georgi Demetradze	Alania	14
2	(Russia) Vladimir Kulik	CSKA	14
2	(Russia) Yury Matveyev	Rostselmash	14
5	(Russia) Oleg Teryokhin	Dynamo	12
6	(Russia) Valery Yesipov	Rotor	11
7	(Russia) Ilya Tsymbalar	Spartak Moscow	10
8	(Russia) Sergei Semak	CSKA	9
8	(Russia) Yevgeny Durnev	Uralan	9
8	(Belarus) Vyacheslav Geraschenko	Chernomorets	9
8	(Russia) Viktor Bulatov	Torpedo	9

== Medal squads ==
1. FC Spartak Moscow

Goalkeepers: Aleksandr Filimonov (29), Andrei Smetanin (2).
Defenders: Dmytro Parfenov (Ukraine) (29 / 1), Dmitri Khlestov (23 / 1), Sergei Gorlukovich (21 / 1), Dmitri Ananko (19), Miroslav Romaschenko (Belarus) (18 / 3), Yevgeni Bushmanov (14 / 1), Vadim Evseev (6), Konstantin Golovskoy (1).
Midfielders: Andrey Tikhonov (30 / 4), Ilya Tsymbalar (29 / 10), Yegor Titov (29 / 6), Aleksei Melyoshin (16 / 1), Vasili Baranov (Belarus) (14 / 3), Dmitri Alenichev (13 / 2), Leandro Samaroni (Brazil) (10).
Forwards: Anatoli Kanishchev (24 / 6), Luis Robson (Brazil) (20 / 3), Nikolai Pisarev (17 / 7), Maksim Buznikin (14 / 3), Aleksandr Shirko (13 / 5).
(league appearances and goals listed in brackets)

One own goal scored by Aleksandr Yeshchenko (FC Zhemchuzhina Sochi).

Manager: Oleg Romantsev.

Transferred out during the season: Dmitri Alenichev (to (Italy) A.S. Roma), Vadim Evseev (to FC Torpedo Moscow), Konstantin Golovskoy (to FC Dynamo Moscow).

2. PFC CSKA Moscow

Goalkeepers: Andrei Novosadov (20), Ihor Kutepov (Ukraine) (10).
Defenders: Yevgeni Varlamov (29 / 1), Oleg Kornaukhov (28 / 3), Maksim Bokov (27 / 1), Valeri Minko (25 / 1), Aleksandr Shchyogolev (9), Dmitri Sennikov (7), Vladimir Isakov (1).
Midfielders: Dmitri Khomukha (Turkmenistan) (30 / 8), Sergei Semak (29 / 9), Sergei Filippenkov (27 / 5), Aleksandr Grishin (27), Aleksandr Gerasimov (24 / 1), Aleksei Savelyev (20 / 2), Andrei Tsaplin (16 / 1), Aleksandr Borodkin (14 / 2), Dmitri Kuznetsov (12), Aleksei Babenko (11), Oleksandr Shutov (Ukraine) (9 / 1), Sergei Shustikov (6).
Forwards: Vladimir Kulik (30 / 14), Sergey Korovushkin (4).

One own goal scored by Vyacheslav Tsaryov (FC Uralan Elista).

Manager: Pavel Sadyrin (until July), Oleg Dolmatov (from July).

Transferred out during the season: Dmitri Kuznetsov (to FC Arsenal Tula), Aleksandr Shchyogolev (to FC Fakel Voronezh), Dmitri Sennikov (to FC Shinnik Yaroslavl), Sergei Shustikov (to (Spain) Racing Santander).

3. FC Lokomotiv Moscow

Goalkeepers: Ruslan Nigmatullin (30), Khasanbi Bidzhiyev (1).
Defenders: Igor Chugainov (30 / 4), Sergei Gurenko (Belarus) (29), Andrei Lavrik (Belarus) (24 / 1), Andrei Solomatin (23), Igor Cherevchenko (Tajikistan) (21 / 1), Aleksei Arifullin (13), Sargis Hovhannisyan (Armenia) (12 / 1), Oleg Pashinin (Uzbekistan) (10).
Midfielders: Yevgeni Kharlachyov (27 / 1), Yuri Drozdov (26 / 1), Vladimir Maminov (Uzbekistan) (19 / 3), Dmitri Loskov (18 / 4), Aleksandr Borodyuk (15 / 8), Bakhva Tedeyev (15 / 1), Aleksei Kosolapov (10 / 2), Albert Sarkisyan (Armenia) (9 / 3), Aleksandr Smirnov (3).
Forwards: Zaza Janashia (Georgia (country)) (28 / 8), Oleh Haras (Ukraine) (16 / 2), Dmitri Bulykin (14 / 3), Mikalay Ryndzyuk (Belarus) (8), Vitali Veselov (5 / 1), Oleg Sergeyev (1).

One own goal scored by Sergei Zhuravlyov (FC Tyumen).

Manager: Yuri Syomin.

Transferred out during the season: Alexei Kosolapov (to (Israel) Maccabi Tel Aviv F.C.).

== Attendances ==
#	Club	Average
1	Alania	26,333
2	Baltika	16,933
3	Krylia Sovetov	16,667
4	Zenit	14,867
5	Spartak Moscow	11,667
6	Rostselmash	11,373
7	Rotor	10,747
8	Chernomorets	9,867
9	Shinnik	9,233
10	PFC CSKA	7,847
11	Torpedo	7,233
12	Zhemchuzhina	6,467
13	Elista	5,733
14	Dynamo Moscow	5,127
15	Lokomotiv Moscow	3,380
16	Tyumen	2,627

== See also ==
- 1998 in Russian football
- 1998 Russian First Division
- 1998 Russian Second Division
