= Shapkin =

Shapkin (Russian: Шапкин, from шапка meaning cap) is a Russian masculine surname, its feminine counterpart is Shapkina. It may refer to

- Timofey Shapkin (1885–1943), Russian military commander
- Roman Shapkin (born 1971), Russian football coach and a former player
- Yury Shapkin (born 1987), Russian freestyle skier
