= Gryazin =

Gryazin (Russian: Грязин), feminine: Gryazina is a Russian surname. Notable people with the surname include:

- Aleksandr Gryazin, Russian footballer
- Igor Gräzin, Estonian politician of Russian ancestry
- Nikolay Gryazin, Russian-Bulgarian rally driver
