= Aleksandr Gerasimov =

Aleksandr Gerasimov may refer to:

- Aleksandr Gerasimov (painter) (1881–1963), Russian painter
- Aleksandr Gerasimov (footballer) (born 1969), Russian footballer
- Aleksandr Gerasimov (volleyball) (born 1975), Russian volleyball player
- Aleksandr Gerasimov (military musician) (born 1962), Russian military musician and Director of the Moscow Military Music College.
- Alexander Gerasimov (ice hockey) (1959–2020), Russian ice hockey player
