= Vitaliy Baranov =

Vitaliy Baranov may refer to:

- Vitaliy Baranov (figure skater) (born 1975), Ukrainian-British figure skater
- Vitaliy Baranov (footballer) (born 1980), Russian footballer
