= Roman Berezovsky =

Armenian footballer (born 1974)

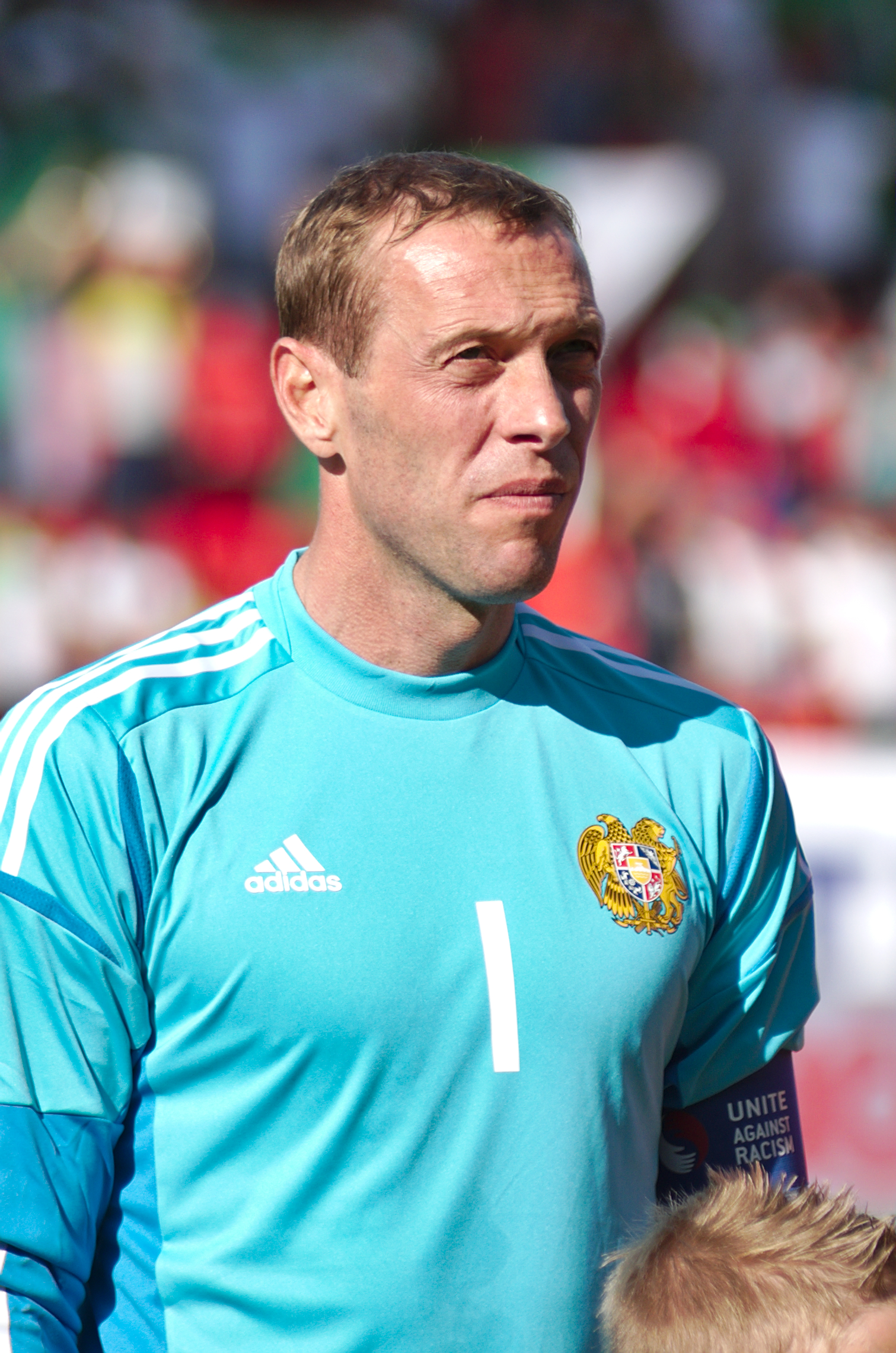
- Berezovsky in 2014

Personal information
- Full name: Roman Anatoliyevich Berezovsky
- Date of birth: 5 August 1974 (age 52)
- Place of birth: Yerevan, Armenia SSR, Soviet Union
- Height: 1.88 m (6 ft 2 in)
- Position: Goalkeeper

Team information
- Current team: Spartak Kostroma (manager)

Youth career
- 1991–1992: Shengavit Yerevan

Senior career*
Years	Team	Apps	(Gls)
1991–1992	Shengavit Yerevan	40	(0)
1992	Syunik Kapan	13	(0)
1993	Kosmos-Kirovets Saint Petersburg	15	(0)
1994–2000	Zenit Saint Petersburg	126	(0)
1994–2000	→ Zenit-d Saint Petersburg	12	(0)
1995	→ Saturn-1991 Saint Petersburg (loan)	3	(0)
2001–2002	Torpedo Moscow	21	(0)
2002–2005	Dynamo Moscow	90	(0)
2006–2012	Khimki	175	(0)
2012–2015	Dynamo Moscow	19	(0)
Total		453	(0)

International career
1996–2016	Armenia	94	(0)

Managerial career
- 2015–2017: Dynamo Moscow (GK coach)
- 2017–2019: Dynamo Moscow (U-21 GK coach)
- 2019: Sochi (GK coach)
- 2019: Sochi (caretaker)
- 2020: Pyunik
- 2020–2022: Armenia (GK coach)
- 2022: Armenia (caretaker)
- 2023: Noah (GK coach)
- 2026–: Spartak Kostroma
- * Club domestic league appearances and goals

Roman Anatoliyevich Berezovsky (Armenian: Ռոման Բերեզովսկի; Russian: Роман Анатольевич Березовский [rɐˈman ɐnɐˈtolʲjɪvʲɪdʑ bʲɪrʲɪˈzofskʲɪj]; born 5 August 1974) is an Armenian professional football coach and a former goalkeeper. He is the manager of Russian First League club Spartak Kostroma.

Berezovsky is the caretaker manager of the Armenia national football team. He previously played for Zenit Saint Petersburg, Khimki and Torpedo Moscow, among other clubs. He also holds a Russian passport.

== Early life ==
Roman Berezovsky was born on 5 August 1974, in Yerevan, Armenian SSR to ethnic Ukrainian parents.

== Club career ==
Roman was voted Russia's best goalkeeper in the late 1990s. His stable performances in the Armenia national team made him a fan favorite. He is also the current record holder for most saves during penalty kicks in the Russian/USSR championships with 14 saves made.

Berezovsky began his professional career in 1991 in the Soviet Top League. The first club of his career was the modest Koshkagorts. In the first Armenian Premier League, the 1992 Armenian Premier League, he started the season in Shengavit Yerevan and ended in Syunik Kapan. After the completion of the season, Berezovsky moved to St. Petersburg, where he played the season with the local Kosmos-Kirovets. After that, for the next season he moved to the Zenit Saint Petersburg. But in that season, he played just five matches.

=== Zenit Saint Petersburg ===
Berezovsky, at the lack of match practice in 1995, was loaned to the club Saturn-1991 Saint Petersburg. But due to rent for the season, he played only three matches. Upon his return to Zenit, Berezovsky entered the peak years of his career. During the five years spent in Petersburg with the club, he has played in 118 games and in which missed 110 balls. They also managed to win the 1998–99 Russian Cup trophy. Also, the goalkeeper finished third in a list of the 33 best players of the Russian Premier League and won 'Best goalkeeper of the Russian Football Championship' from Russian Sport-Express.

In 1999, Zenit began playing goalkeeper Vyacheslav Malafeev, who graduated from the Zenit local football school. After Berezovsky was sent off for insulting a referee, Malafeev made his debut in the match against the Alania Vladikavkaz.

=== Torpedo Moscow ===
Berezovsky spent his last season in Zenit in 2000, from which he went to Torpedo Moscow and then in Dynamo Moscow, where he spent the next four years. With the capital club Torpedo, Berezovsky has not won a trophy, but spent a lot of games (88). On 30 June 2003, he was called to play for the Legionnaires team of the Russian Premier League. The Legion team lost to the Russian team 5–2.

=== Khimki ===
Berezovsky moved to Khimki in 2006. With him, they won a ticket to the Russian Premier League and four seasons entrenched in it. During this period, Berezovsky has won four individual trophies: 3rd place among goalies on the number of clean sheets in the Russian championships, 1st place among goalkeepers on the number of goals conceded in the Russian Premier League, and became the Champion of Russia in the Soviet and Russian football as reflected by the number of penalties. Berezovsky became the 26th member of the Lev Yashin club. In a match with Amkar, Khimki won 2–0. This was his one hundredth "dry" game. On 15 April 2008, Berezovsky was elected captain of FC Khimki. On 27 December 2010, Roman signed a new contract with the club. The agreement was for one-year. At 175, Berezovsky has made two second most league appearances for Khimki, after Miodrag Jovanović.

=== Return to Dynamo Moscow ===
On 2 February 2012, Berezovsky signed a 1.5-year contract with Dynamo Moscow. It had been 10 years since he signed his first contract with Dynamo. He made his debut against Anzhi Makhachkala.

He began the 2014–15 Russian Premier League season for Dynamo Moscow as the starting goalkeeper.

At the age of 40, he started in all 4 UEFA Europa League qualifying round matches for Dynamo Moscow, which saw the team successfully enter the group stage of the 2014–15 UEFA Europa League.

== International career ==
Roman has participated in 79 international matches since his debut in home 1998 FIFA World Cup qualification match against Portugal on 31 August 1996. He is considered as the best Armenian goalkeeper ever. Berezovsky holds the record of second most capped player of the Armenia national team, after former captain Sargis Hovsepyan. He was controversially given a red card during a decisive UEFA Euro 2012 qualifying game against Ireland. Spanish referee Eduardo Iturralde González, who resigned after the match, penalized Berezovsky for handball, although replays clearly showed his hands never touched the ball. The FFA filed protest over the bad call, but were denied. Berezovsky's undeserved removal had been the factor that cost Armenia the game. He was named the new captain for the national team on 12 October 2012 and first played as captain for a 2014 FIFA World Cup qualification match against Italy after Hovsepyan had previously retired.

== Coaching career ==
On 19 June 2019, he left FC Dynamo Moscow after 11 years spent at the club and joined PFC Sochi as a goalkeepers coach under the manager (and former teammate) Aleksandr Tochilin in Sochi's first ever Russian Premier League season. On 20 November 2019, Tochilin was dismissed for poor results and Berezovsky was appointed caretaker manager. The new permanent manager Vladimir Fedotov was appointed by Sochi on 8 December.

=== Pyunik ===
On 8 January 2020, Berezovsky was announced as the new manager of Armenian Premier League club FC Pyunik. Just over 7-months later, 13 July 2020, Berezovsky left the club by mutual consent.

=== Noah ===
On 25 October 2023, it was announced that he has joined Armenian Premier League club FC Noah as a goalkeeper coach.

== Career statistics ==
Appearances and goals by national team and year
National team	Year	Apps	Goals
Armenia	1996	3	0
Armenia	1997	5	0
Armenia	1998	4	0
Armenia	1999	8	0
Armenia	2000	5	0
Armenia	2001	3	0
Armenia	2002	2	0
Armenia	2003	6	0
Armenia	2004	1	0
Armenia	2005	6	0
Armenia	2006	2	0
Armenia	2007	6	0
Armenia	2008	4	0
Armenia	2009	3	0
Armenia	2010	5	0
Armenia	2011	6	0
Armenia	2012	6	0
Armenia	2013	8	0
Armenia	2014	8	0
Armenia	2015	2	0
Armenia	2016	1	0
Total		94	0

== Honours ==
Zenit Saint Petersburg

- Russian Cup: 1998–99

Khimki

- Russian First Division: 2006
