= Yegor Glukhov =

Russian footballer

Personal information
- Full name: Yegor Yevgenyevich Glukhov
- Date of birth: 19 May 1998 (age 28)
- Height: 1.78 m (5 ft 10 in)
- Position: Midfielder

Team information
- Current team: Spartak Tambov
- Number: 17

Senior career*
| Years | Team | Apps | (Gls) |
| 2016–2021 | Tyumen | 62 | (1) |
| 2021–2022 | Saturn Ramenskoye | 20 | (3) |
| 2022–2024 | Novosibirsk | 44 | (2) |
| 2024–2025 | Metallurg Lipetsk | 40 | (6) |
| 2026 | Dynamo Saint Petersburg | 10 | (0) |
| 2026– | Spartak Tambov | 14 | (0) |
- * Club domestic league appearances and goals as of 31 October 2026

Yegor Yevgenyevich Glukhov (Russian: Егор Евгеньевич Глухов; born 19 May 1998) is a Russian footballer who plays as a midfielder for Spartak Tambov. He is the son of former footballer Yevgeni Glukhov.

== Club career ==
Glukhov made his professional debut in the Russian Cup for Tyumen on 24 August 2016 in a game against Sibir Novosibirsk. He made his Russian Football National League debut for Tyumen on 8 April 2017 in a game against Sibir Novosibirsk.

On 9 September 2021, Glukhov signed with Russian Football National League 2 club Saturn Ramenskoye.
