= Konstantin Fishman =

Russian footballer

Personal information
- Full name: Konstantin Viktorovich Fishman
- Date of birth: 17 December 1977 (age 48)
- Place of birth: Tyumen, Russian SFSR
- Height: 1.70 m (5 ft 7 in)
- Position: Midfielder

Senior career*
Years	Team	Apps	(Gls)
1994–1995	FC Dynamo-Gazovik Tyumen	13	(0)
1996–1997	FC Rostselmash Rostov-on-Don	30	(1)
1998–2002	FC Tyumen	115	(8)
2003	FC Irtysh Omsk	21	(3)
2005–2009	FC Tyumen	96	(19)

International career
1998–1999	Russia U-21	4	(0)
- * Club domestic league appearances and goals

Konstantin Viktorovich Fishman (Russian: Константин Викторович Фишман; born 17 December 1977) is a Russian former professional footballer.

== Club career ==
Born in Tyumen, Fishman began playing football in the youth academy of local club Dynamo-Gazovik Tyumen. Manager Vyacheslav Malofeev gave Fishman his professional debut at age 16 during the 1994 Russian Premier League season.

Fishman's father, Viktor, and brother, Sergey, were also footballers. Sergey played in the Russian Second Division with Irtysh Tobolsk.
