= Andrei Bulatov =

Russian footballer and coach (born 1978)

Personal information
- Full name: Andrei Yuryevich Bulatov
- Date of birth: 1 March 1978 (age 48)
- Place of birth: Solnechnogorsk, Russia, Soviet Union
- Height: 1.83 m (6 ft 0 in)
- Position: Defender

Senior career*
Years	Team	Apps	(Gls)
1996	FC Dynamo-2 Moscow	24	(0)
1997	FC Dynamo-d Moscow	38	(0)
1998–2000	FC Dynamo-2 Moscow	63	(2)
1999–2001	FC Dynamo Moscow	41	(0)
2002–2003	FC Khimki	37	(0)
2008	FC Varyagi Moscow		

International career
1999	Russia U-21	3	(0)

Managerial career
- 2008: FC Varyagi Moscow
- * Club domestic league appearances and goals

Andrei Yuryevich Bulatov (Russian: Андрей Юрьевич Булатов; born 1 March 1978) is a Russian professional football coach and a former player.

== Club career ==
He made his debut in the Russian Premier League in 1999 for FC Dynamo Moscow.

In 2000 he graduated from the Moscow Institute of Chemical Technology named after Dmitry Mendeleev.
