= Eduard Zatsepin =

Russian footballer

Personal information
- Full name: Eduard Konstantinovich Zatsepin
- Date of birth: 27 April 1974 (age 52)
- Place of birth: Michurinsk, Tambov Oblast, Russian SFSR
- Height: 1.76 m (5 ft 9 1/2 in)
- Position: Forward

Youth career
- Spartak Tambov

Senior career*
| Years | Team | Apps | (Gls) |
| 1992–1994 | Spartak Tambov | 91 | (17) |
| 1995–1997 | Svetotekhnika Saransk | 112 | (39) |
| 1998–1999 | Zhemchuzhina Sochi | 43 | (6) |
| 2000 | Shinnik Yaroslavl | 17 | (3) |
| 2000 | Metallurg Lipetsk | 15 | (4) |
| 2001–2003 | Volgar-Gazprom Astrakhan | 81 | (22) |
| 2003 | Lisma-Mordovia Saransk | 5 | (0) |
| 2004 | Dynamo Bryansk | 21 | (7) |
| 2004–2006 | Sodovik Sterlitamak | 91 | (62) |
| 2007 | Salyut-Energia Belgorod | 32 | (4) |
| 2008 | Dynamo Voronezh | 27 | (8) |
| 2009 | Irtysh Pavlodar | 6 | (0) |
| 2009 | Vitebsk | 8 | (0) |
| 2010 | Kaluga | 29 | (6) |
| 2011 | Avangard Kursk | 13 | (1) |
- * Club domestic league appearances and goals

Eduard Konstantinovich Zatsepin (Russian: Эдуард Константинович Зацепин; born 27 April 1974) is a Russian former professional footballer.

== Honours ==
- Russian Second Division Zone Ural/Povolzhye best player: 2005.
- Russian Second Division top scorer: 1997 (Zone Center, 26 goals), 2005 (Zone Ural/Povolzhye, 36 goals).
