= Aleksandre Geladze =

Georgian footballer

Personal information
- Date of birth: 19 November 1972 (age 53)
- Height: 1.87 m (6 ft 2 in)
- Position: Midfielder

Senior career*
Years	Team	Apps	(Gls)
1989	FC Dinamo Tbilisi (reserves)		
1990	STU Tbilisi	1	(0)
1990	FC Mertskhali Ozurgeti	8	(0)
1991–1992	Armazi-90 Tbilisi	32	(14)
1992–1993	FC Shevardeni-1906 Tbilisi	15	(0)
1993–1994	FC Mretebi Tbilisi	24	(6)
1994–1995	Eintracht Braunschweig	16	(0)
1995–1996	FC Mretebi Tbilisi	26	(12)
1997	FC Guria Lanchkhuti	11	(5)
1997	FC Merani-91 Tbilisi	0	(0)
1998	FC Dinamo Tbilisi	12	(1)
1998	FC Zhemchuzhina-Sochi	3	(0)
1999–2000	FC Zhemchuzhina-2 Sochi	6	(0)
2000–2002	FC Gorda Rustavi	14	(0)
2002	FC SKA Rostov-on-Don	7	(0)
- * Club domestic league appearances and goals

Aleksandre Geladze (born 19 November 1972) is a Georgian retired professional football player.
