= Sergei Rastegayev =

Russian footballer and manager

Personal information
- Full name: Sergei Aleksandrovich Rastegayev
- Date of birth: 29 January 1972 (age 54)
- Place of birth: Engels, Russian SFSR
- Height: 1.90 m (6 ft 3 in)
- Position: Defender

Team information
- Current team: FC Iskra Engels (manager)

Youth career
- SEPO Saratov

Senior career*
Years	Team	Apps	(Gls)
1990	FC Shakhtar Donetsk	0	(0)
1990	FC Uholyok Krasnoarmiisk		
1991	FC Shakhtar Donetsk	0	(0)
1991–1992	FC Kryvbas Kryvyi Rih	45	(4)
1993	FC Dionis Engels		
1994–1998	FC Sokol Saratov	168	(16)
1998	FC Metallurg Lipetsk	24	(1)
1999–2000	FC Fakel Voronezh	48	(3)
2001	FC Metallurg Krasnoyarsk	9	(2)
2002	FC Fakel-Voronezh Voronezh	0	(0)
2002	FC Gazovik-Gazprom Izhevsk	7	(1)
2003	FC Dynamo Bryansk	17	(0)
2003	FC Esil Kokshetau	15	(0)

Managerial career
- 2015–: FC Iskra Engels
- * Club domestic league appearances and goals

Sergei Aleksandrovich Rastegayev (Russian: Сергей Александрович Растегаев; born 29 January 1972) is a Russian football manager and a former player. He manages FC Iskra Engels.
