= Andrey Perederiy =

Russian association football player (born 1974)

Personal information
- Full name: Andrey Vladimirovich Perederiy
- Date of birth: 3 August 1974 (age 52)
- Place of birth: Ordzhonikidze, USSR
- Height: 1.74 m (5 ft 8 1/2 in)
- Positions: Attacking midfielder; forward

Team information
- Current team: FC Alania Vladikavkaz (team director)

Senior career*
Years	Team	Apps	(Gls)
1992–2000	FC Avtodor Vladikavkaz	296	(95)
2001	FC Sodovik Sterlitamak	17	(6)
2002–2003	FC Avtodor Vladikavkaz	42	(8)
2003–2004	FC Mashuk-KMV Pyatigorsk	37	(6)
2005	FC Olimpia Volgograd	3	(0)
2005	FC Avtodor Vladikavkaz	8	(1)

Managerial career
- 2006–2007: FC Avtodor Vladikavkaz (assistant)
- 2007: FC Avtodor Vladikavkaz (sports director)
- 2008: FC Avtodor Vladikavkaz (technical director)
- 2009: FC Avtodor Vladikavkaz (sports director)
- 2010–2018: FC FAYUR Beslan (sports director)
- 2018–2019: FC Spartak Vladikavkaz (assistant)
- 2019–: FC Alania Vladikavkaz (team director)
- * Club domestic league appearances and goals

Andrey Vladimirovich Perederiy (Russian: Андре́й Влади́мирович Переде́рий; born 3 August 1974) is a Russian professional football official, coach and a former player. He is the team director with FC Alania Vladikavkaz.

== Career ==
As a player, he made his debut in the Russian Second Division in 1991 for FC Avtodor Vladikavkaz. He later played 2 seasons in the Russian Football National League for Avtodor. Record holder of the club by the number of matches played and his best scorer of all time (346 games, 104 goals).
