= Vsevolod Zhuravlyov =

Russian footballer

Personal information
- Full name: Vsevolod Svyatoslavovich Zhuravlyov
- Date of birth: 27 December 1978 (age 47)
- Height: 1.94 m (6 ft 4 1/2 in)
- Position: Defender

Youth career
- FC Dynamo Moscow

Senior career*
Years	Team	Apps	(Gls)
1995–1999	FC Dynamo-2 Moscow	147	(23)
2000–2001	FC Lokomotiv Nizhny Novgorod	22	(0)
2002–2003	FC Metallurg-Kuzbass Novokuznetsk	45	(5)
2004	FC Lukoil Chelyabinsk	15	(1)
- * Club domestic league appearances and goals

Vsevolod Svyatoslavovich Zhuravlyov (Russian: Всеволод Святославович Журавлёв; born 27 December 1978) is a former Russian professional football player.

Zhuravlyov played in the Russian First Division with FC Lokomotiv Nizhny Novgorod and FC Metallurg-Kuzbass Novokuznetsk.
