= Andrei Durov =

Russian footballer

Personal information
- Full name: Andrei Nikolayevich Durov
- Date of birth: 20 February 1977 (age 49)
- Place of birth: Voronezh, Russian SFSR
- Height: 1.90 m (6 ft 3 in)
- Position: Defender

Senior career*
Years	Team	Apps	(Gls)
1993	FC Volgar Astrakhan	11	(0)
1993–1995	FC Rotor-d Volgograd	53	(2)
1996	FC Torpedo Volzhsky	30	(2)
1997	FC Lada-Grad Dimitrovgrad	34	(3)
1998–2001	FC Rotor Volgograd	9	(0)
1998–2000	FC Rotor-2 Volgograd	30	(2)
2001–2002	FC KAMAZ Naberezhnye Chelny	51	(1)
2003–2005	FC Ural Yekaterinburg	96	(6)
2005	→ FC Metallurg Lipetsk (loan)	21	(1)
2008	FC SKA-Energia Khabarovsk	29	(1)
2009	FC Volgograd	24	(1)
2010–2011	FC Zvezda Ryazan	51	(1)

International career
1998–1999	Russia U-21	7	(0)

Managerial career
- 2020–2021: FC Smolensk (assistant)
- 2021: FC Smolensk
- * Club domestic league appearances and goals

Andrei Nikolayevich Durov (Russian: Андрей Николаевич Дуров; born 20 February 1977) is a Russian professional football coach and a former player.

== Club career ==
He made his debut in the Russian Premier League in 1998 for FC Rotor Volgograd.
