= Lucky Isibor =

Nigerian footballer (1977–2013)

Personal information
- Full name: Anthony Joseph Isibor
- Date of birth: 1 January 1977
- Place of birth: Benin City, Nigeria
- Date of death: 24 June 2013 (aged 36)
- Place of death: Lagos, Nigeria
- Height: 1.90 m (6 ft 3 in)
- Position: Striker

Senior career*
| Years | Team | Apps | (Gls) |
| 1995 | Concord FC (Nigeria) | | |
| 1995–1996 | Bellinzona | | |
| 1996–1997 | Luka Koper | 12 | (2) |
| 1997–1998 | Enosis | 17 | (4) |
| 1998–2000 | Reggiana | 4 | (0) |
| 1998 | → Dynamo Moscow (loan) | 27 | (4) |
| 1999–2000 | → Dynamo Moscow (loan) | 24 | (1) |
| 2000 | Suwon Samsung Bluewings | 5 | (1) |
| 2002–2003 | Zürich | 0 | (0) |
- * Club domestic league appearances and goals

Anthony Joseph "Lucky" Isibor (1 January 1977 – 24 June 2013) was a Nigerian professional footballer.

== Career ==
He was playing with Nigerian Concord FC when he moved to Switzerland in 1995 signing with AC Bellinzona. Between 1996 and 1998 he played with Slovenian FC Koper and Cypriot Enosis Neon Paralimni FC before signing with Italian A.C. Reggiana 1919. After that short spell in Italy he moved to Russia. He made his debut in the Russian Premier League in 1998 for FC Dynamo Moscow. He played 4 games in the UEFA Cup 1998–99 for FC Dynamo Moscow. Afterwards he also played in South Korean K-League club Suwon Samsung Bluewings and Swiss FC Zürich. FC Zürich refused to honour his contract after they discovered he was HIV-positive. Swiss court eventually ruled that the club must pay him 315,000 Swiss francs as his HIV status was not deemed in itself a valid reason to dissolve the contract.

According to a 2004 interview with a fellow Nigerian footballer James Obiorah Isibor had AIDS and according to some later reports, he died on 8 January 2006. However, according to former Isibor's teammate Aleksandr Tochilin, another former Dynamo player Patrick Ovie met Isibor in Nigeria after his supposed death and Isibor was healthy and well. He died on 24 June 2013 in Lagos, Nigeria, after a brief illness.

== Honours ==
- Russian Cup finalist: 1999.
