= Yevgeni Glukhov (footballer, born 1976) =

Russian footballer

Personal information
- Full name: Yevgeni Vladimirovich Glukhov
- Date of birth: 1 March 1976 (age 50)
- Height: 1.78 m (5 ft 10 in)
- Position: Midfielder

Youth career
- Geolog

Senior career*
Years	Team	Apps	(Gls)
1992–1994	Stroitel Tyumen		
1994–1995	Dynamo-Gazovik Tyumen	0	(0)
1995	→ Dynamo-Gazovik-d Tyumen (loan)	23	(2)
1996–1998	Irtysh Tobolsk	41	(0)
1998	Tyumen	13	(1)
1999–2001	Baltika Kaliningrad	33	(2)
2001–2002	Tyumen	21	(7)
2003–2005	Tyumen (amateur)		
- * Club domestic league appearances and goals

Yevgeni Vladimirovich Glukhov (Russian: Евгений Владимирович Глухов; born 1 March 1976) is a Russian former professional footballer who played as a midfielder.

== Playing career ==
Glukhov progressed through the youth academy of Geolog in Tyumen. As a senior player, he began to play for amateur team Stroitel Tyumen, before moving to the reserve team of Dynamo-Gazovik Tyumen. From 1996 to 1998, he played in the second division for Irtysh Tobolsk.

In the summer transfer window of 1998, he returned to Tyumen – formerly Geolog – as the club was experiencing financial problems and was an outsider of the top division. He made his league debut on 15 July 1998 against Lokomotiv Moscow, and scored his first goal on 22 August against Baltika Kaliningrad. In his first six months, he made 13 matches in the top flight and scored one goal.

From 1999 to 2001, he played in the top division for Baltika, but failed to become a starter, playing 33 matches in two-and-a-half seasons. In the summer of 2001, he returned to Tyumen, where he spent a season and a half in the second division, then played for three years at the amateur level.

== Managerial career ==
In 2011, Glukhov was appointed coach of Tyumen's youth team. In 2013–14, he worked as an executive at futsal club "Tyumen", where he in 2014 became team leader.

== Personal life ==
His son Yegor Glukhov (born 1998) is also a professional footballer.
