= FC Neftyanik Buguruslan =

Russian football club

- Full name: Football Club Neftyanik Buguruslan
- Founded: ?
- League: Amateur Football League, Zone Privolzhye
- 2009: 10th

FC Neftyanik Buguruslan (Russian: «Нефтяник» (Бугуруслан)) is an association football team from Buguruslan, Russia. It played professionally from 1994 to 1999. Their best result was 16th place in Zone Privolzhye of the Russian Second Division in 1998 and 1999.

== Team name and location history ==
- 1993–1999: FC Neftyanik Pokhvistnevo
- 2000: FC Sputnik Buguruslan
- 2001–present: FC Neftyanik Buguruslan
