= FC Iskra Engels =

Russian football club

- Full name: Football Club Iskra Engels
- Founded: 1967
- Manager: Sergei Rastegayev
- League: Russian Amateur Football League

FC Iskra Engels (Russian: «Искра» (Энгельс)) is a Russian football team from Engels. It played professionally in 1967–1969, 1993 and 1996–2005. Their best result was 5th place in the Zone Povolzhye of the Russian Second Division in 1999.

== Team name history ==
- 1967–1968: FC Trud Engels
- 1969: FC Avtomobilist Engels
- 1992–1994: FC Zavolzhye Engels
- 1995–2005: FC Iskra Engels
