= Artashes Kalaydzhan =

Russian footballer and coach

Personal information
- Full name: Artashes Armenakovich Kalaydzhan
- Date of birth: 28 December 1971 (age 54)
- Place of birth: Sochi, Russian SFSR
- Height: 1.85 m (6 ft 1 in)
- Positions: Midfielder; striker

Youth career
- DYuSSh-7 Sochi

Senior career*
Years	Team	Apps	(Gls)
1991	FC Zhemchuzhina Sochi	5	(0)
1992–1993	FC Torpedo Adler	14	(4)
1996–1997	FC Dynamo-Zhemchuzhina-2 Sochi	39	(4)
1997	FC Volgar-Gazprom Astrakhan	0	(0)
1998–1999	FC Zhemchuzhina Sochi	51	(6)
2000	FC Chernomorets Novorossiysk	9	(0)
2000	FC Zhemchuzhina Sochi	14	(1)
2002	FC SKA Rostov-on-Don	8	(0)
2003	FC Zhemchuzhina Sochi	11	(2)

Managerial career
- 2005: FC Sochi-04
- 2006: FC Sochi-04 (director)
- 2015: FC Sochi (director of sports)
- * Club domestic league appearances and goals

Artashes Armenakovich Kalaydzhan (Russian: Арташес Арменакович Калайджан/Калайджян; born 28 December 1971) is a Russian professional football coach and a former player of Armenian descent.

== Club career ==
He made his professional debut in the Soviet Second League B in 1991 for FC Zhemchuzhina Sochi.
