= Aleksandr Shchyogolev =

Russian footballer

Personal information
- Full name: Aleksandr Yevgenyevich Shchyogolev
- Date of birth: 1 April 1972 (age 54)
- Place of birth: Voronezh, Russian SFSR
- Height: 1.79 m (5 ft 10 in)
- Positions: Defender; midfielder

Team information
- Current team: FC Fakel Voronezh (assistant manager)

Senior career*
| Years | Team | Apps | (Gls) |
| 1989–1990 | FC Fakel Voronezh | 4 | (0) |
| 1990–1991 | FC Buran Voronezh | 60 | (9) |
| 1992–1997 | FC Fakel Voronezh | 199 | (13) |
| 1998 | PFC CSKA Moscow | 9 | (0) |
| 1998–1999 | FC Fakel Voronezh | 50 | (2) |
| 2000 | FC Spartak Moscow | 18 | (1) |
| 2001–2005 | FC Fakel Voronezh | 141 | (8) |
| 2006 | FC Salyut-Energia Belgorod | 23 | (1) |
| 2007 | FC Trud Voronezh | | |
| 2008 | FC Lokomotiv Liski | 9 | (0) |

Managerial career
- 2007–2008: FC Trud Voronezh
- 2008: FC Lokomotiv Liski
- 2008: FC Dynamo-Voronezh (director)
- 2009: FC Fakel-Voronezh (director of sports)
- 2009–2010: FC Dynamo Voronezh
- 2012: FC Sloboda Alekseyevka
- 2013: FC Fakel Voronezh
- 2013: FC Fakel Voronezh (assistant)
- 2014–2015: FC Fakel Voronezh (assistant)
- 2016–2018: FC Fakel Voronezh (youth)
- 2018–: FC Fakel Voronezh (assistant)
- * Club domestic league appearances and goals

Aleksandr Yevgenyevich Shchyogolev (Russian: Александр Евгеньевич Щёголев; born 1 April 1972) is a Russian professional football coach and a former player who works as an assistant manager with FC Fakel Voronezh.

== Club career ==
He made his debut in the Soviet First League in 1990 for FC Fakel Voronezh. He played 1 game for FC Spartak Moscow in the UEFA Champions League 2000–01.

== Honours ==
- Russian Premier League champion: 2000.
- Russian Premier League runner-up: 1998.
- Russian Second Division Zone Center best player: 2004.
