= 1998 in Russian football =

1998 season

1998 in Russian football was marked by Spartak Moscow's sixth national title.

== National team ==
Russia national football team began their qualification for the Euro 2000.

Date	Venue	Opponents	Score^{1}	Competition	Russia scorers	Match Report
18 February 1998	Olympic Stadium, Athens (A)	Greece	1–1	F	Igor Kolyvanov	RussiaTeam
25 March 1998	Dynamo Stadium, Moscow (H)	France	1–0	F	Sergey Yuran	RussiaTeam
22 April 1998	Lokomotiv Stadium, Moscow (H)	Turkey	1–0	F	Vladimir Beschastnykh	RussiaTeam
27 May 1998	Silesia Stadium, Chorzów (A)	Poland	1–3	F	Aleksey Gerasimenko	RussiaTeam
30 May 1998	Boris Paichadze Stadium, Tbilisi (A)	Georgia	1–1	F	Igor Simutenkov	RussiaTeam
19 August 1998	Eyravallen, Örebro (A)	Sweden	0–1	F		RussiaTeam
10 October 1998	Luzhniki Stadium, Moscow (H)	France	2–3	ECQ	Igor Yanovskiy, Aleksandr Mostovoi	uefa
14 October 1998	Laugardalsvöllur, Reykjavík (A)	Iceland	0–1	ECQ		uefa
18 November 1998	Estádio Plácido Castelo, Fortaleza (A)	Brazil	1–5	ECQ	Oleg Kornaukhov	RussiaTeam

1. Russia score given first

Key

- H = Home match
- A = Away match
- F = Friendly
- ECQ = 2000 UEFA European Football Championship qualifying, Group 4

== Leagues ==
The Russian league system underwent reorganization for the 1998 season. The "leagues" were renamed "divisions". The Second Division was extended to six zones with 16–22 teams (compared to three zones of the Second League), while the Third League was abolished. These changes reduced the number of levels in Russian professional football to three.

=== Top Division ===
Pos	Team	Pld	W	D	L	GF	GA	GD	Pts	Qualification or relegation
1	Spartak Moscow (C)	30	17	8	5	58	27	+31	59	Qualification to Champions League third qualifying round
2	CSKA Moscow	30	17	5	8	50	22	+28	56	Qualification to Champions League second qualifying round
3	Lokomotiv Moscow	30	16	7	7	45	28	+17	55	Qualification to UEFA Cup qualifying round
4	Rotor Volgograd	30	12	12	6	52	37	+15	48	
5	Zenit St. Petersburg	30	12	11	7	42	25	+17	47	Qualification to UEFA Cup first round
6	Rostselmash	30	11	11	8	42	38	+4	44	Qualification to Intertoto Cup second round
7	Uralan Elista	30	12	6	12	39	41	−2	42	
8	Alania Vladikavkaz	30	11	7	12	46	39	+7	40	
9	Dynamo Moscow	30	8	15	7	31	30	+1	39	
10	Chernomorets Novorossiysk	30	9	11	10	38	38	0	38	
11	Torpedo Moscow (Note: FC Torpedo-Luzhniki Moscow renamed to FC Torpedo)	30	9	10	11	38	34	+4	37	
12	Krylia Sovetov Samara	30	9	8	13	25	37	−12	35	
13	Zhemchuzhina Sochi	30	9	8	13	31	48	−17	35	
14	Shinnik Yaroslavl	30	9	8	13	30	40	−10	35	
15	Baltika Kaliningrad (R)	30	7	11	12	32	43	−11	32	Relegation to First Division
16	Tyumen (Note: FC Dynamo-Gazovik Tyumen renamed to FC Tyumen) (R)	30	2	2	26	17	89	−72	8	Relegation to First Division

Source: rsssf.com
Rules for classification: 1) points; 2) goal difference; 3) number of goals scored.
(C) Champions; (R) Relegated

=== First Division ===
Saturn won the First Division, winning their first promotion to the Top Division. Runners-up Lokomotiv Nizhny Novgorod made their return to the top flight.

Pos	Team	Pld	W	D	L	GF	GA	GD	Pts	Promotion or relegation
1	Saturn Ramenskoye (P)	42	24	12	6	73	34	+39	84	Promotion to Top Division
2	Lokomotiv N.N. (P)	42	23	8	11	65	34	+31	77	Promotion to Top Division
3	Sokol Saratov (Note: FC Sokol-PZhD Saratov renamed to FC Sokol.)	42	21	13	8	58	32	+26	76	
4	Kristall Smolensk (Note: FC CSK VVS-Kristall Smolensk renamed to FC Kristall after playing 6 games.)	42	23	3	16	59	47	+12	72	
5	Arsenal Tula	42	18	11	13	65	53	+12	65	
6	Lada-Grad Dimitrovgrad	42	19	7	16	65	63	+2	64	
7	Rubin Kazan	42	19	6	17	56	50	+6	63	
8	Dynamo Stavropol	42	16	15	11	51	37	+14	63	
9	Gazovik-Gazprom Izhevsk	42	18	6	18	53	58	−5	60	
10	Fakel Voronezh	42	17	9	16	54	45	+9	60	
11	Anzhi Makhachkala	42	17	6	19	47	56	−9	57	
12	Metallurg Lipetsk	42	16	8	18	41	50	−9	56	
13	Lokomotiv Chita	42	16	8	18	57	50	+7	56 (Note: FC Lokomotiv Chita awarded 5 home wins.)	
14	Tom Tomsk	42	15	11	16	54	45	+9	56	
15	Spartak Nalchik	42	15	11	16	49	52	−3	56	
16	Lokomotiv St. Petersburg	42	14	11	17	38	41	−3	53	
17	Neftekhimik Nizhnekamsk (R)	42	15	7	20	44	56	−12	52	Qualification for Promotion play-offs
18	Druzhba Maykop (R)	42	13	11	18	45	55	−10	50	Relegation to Second Division
19	Lada-Togliatti-VAZ Togliatti (R)	42	15	9	18	52	70	−18	48 (Note: FC Lada-Togliatti-VAZ Togliatti deducted 6 points and awarded 1 home win.)	Relegation to Second Division
20	Kuban Krasnodar (R)	42	10	13	19	42	68	−26	43	Relegation to Second Division
21	Irtysh Omsk (R)	42	11	8	23	36	58	−22	41	Relegation to Second Division
22	KAMAZ-Chally Naberezhnye Chelny (R)	42	7	5	30	32	82	−50	26	Relegation to Second Division

Source: RSSSF
(P) Promoted; (R) Relegated
Notes:

(Brazil) Andradina of Arsenal became the top goalscorer with 27 goals.

=== Second Division ===
Of six clubs that finished first in their respective Second Division zones, five with the best records were promoted to the First Division, and one went to a promotion/relegation playoff.

The clubs promoted automatically were

- FC Spartak-Orekhovo Orekhovo-Zuyevo (Centre)
- FC Volgar-Gazprom Astrakhan (South)
- FC Torpedo-Victoria Nizhny Novgorod (Povolzhye)
- FC Amkar Perm (Ural)
- FC Metallurg Krasnoyarsk (East)

Torpedo-ZIL won the play-off and were promoted to the First Division at the expense of Neftekhimik.

Team 1	Agg.	Team 2	1st leg	2nd leg
FC Neftekhimik Nizhnekamsk	1–3	FC Torpedo-ZIL Moscow (West)	1–1	0–2

== Cup ==
The Russian Cup was won by Spartak Moscow, who beat Lokomotiv Moscow 1–0 in the final.

== UEFA club competitions ==
=== UEFA Cup Winners' Cup 1997-98 ===
Lokomotiv Moscow reached the semifinal of the 1997–98 UEFA Cup Winners' Cup. They eliminated AEK Athens in the quarterfinal but were stopped by VfB Stuttgart in the semifinal.

=== UEFA Cup 1997-98 ===
Spartak Moscow reached the semifinal of the 1997–98 UEFA Cup after beating Ajax Amsterdam in both quarterfinal matches. However, in the semifinal Internazionale Milano F.C. won both matches against Spartak 2–1.

=== UEFA Intertoto Cup 1998 ===
Two Russian clubs played in the UEFA Intertoto Cup 1998, both being eliminated in the third round. Baltika Kaliningrad recorded victories over PFC Spartak Varna and OD Trencin before facing FK Vojvodina, and Shinnik Yaroslavl, who had a bye to the second round, defeated Turun Palloseura before being knocked out by Valencia CF.

=== UEFA Champions League 1998-99 ===
Spartak Moscow qualified for the group stage of the 1998–99 UEFA Champions League by defeating PFC Litex Lovech with an aggregate score of 11–2. Spartak finished third in Group C with Internazionale Milano F.C., Real Madrid, and SK Sturm Graz.

=== UEFA Cup Winners' Cup 1998-99 ===
Lokomotiv Moscow began their way to the 1998–99 UEFA Cup Winners' Cup semifinal by eliminating Arsenal Kyiv and SC Braga in the first two rounds.

=== UEFA Cup 1998-99 ===
Rotor Volgograd were eliminated after the second qualifying round of 1998–99 UEFA Cup, losing twice to Red Star Belgrade. Dynamo Moscow were more successful, winning on aggregate against Polonia Warszawa in the second qualifying round and against Skonto FC in the first round. Their campaign ended after two losses to Real Sociedad in the second round.
