= Andrei Novosadov =

Russian footballer and coach

Andrey Novosadov
Personal information
- Full name: Andrey Nikolaevich Novosadov
- Date of birth: 27 March 1972 (age 54)
- Place of birth: Moscow, Soviet Union
- Height: 1.88 m (6 ft 2 in)
- Position: Goalkeeper

Youth career
- CSKA Moscow

Senior career*
Years	Team	Apps	(Gls)
1989	Chayka-CSKA Moscow	1	(0)
1990	CSKA-2 Moscow	21	(0)
1991	CSKA Moscow	0	(0)
1992–1993	KAMAZ Naberezhnye Chelny	37	(0)
1993–2001	CSKA Moscow	86	(0)
1993–2000	→ CSKA-d / CSKA-2 Moscow	51	(3)
2000	→ Lokomotiv Nizhny Novgorod (loan)	16	(0)
2001–2003	Torpedo-Metallurg Moscow	57	(1)
2004	Fakel Voronezh	29	(0)
2005–2006	KAMAZ Naberezhnye Chelny	47	(0)
Total		344	(4)

International career
1991	USSR U-20	1	(0)
1993	Russia U-21	4	(0)
1998	Russia	1	(0)

Managerial career
- 2008–2009: Vityaz Podolsk (assistant)
- 2009: Vityaz Podolsk (caretaker)
- * Club domestic league appearances and goals

Andrey Nikolaevich Novosadov (Russian: Андрей Николаевич Новосадов; born 27 March 1972) is a Russian association football coach and a former goalkeeper.

== Club career ==
He was the first goalkeeper to score a goal in Russian Premier League, Novosadov did it in 2001 from a penalty kick. He remained the only goalkeeper to score in RPL until Igor Leshchuk scored in 2024.

== International ==
He capped for USSR U-20 team at 1991 FIFA World Youth Championship.

== Honours ==
- Russian Second Division Zone Center best goalkeeper: 2004.
