= Roman Maksymyuk =

Ukrainian footballer (born 1974)

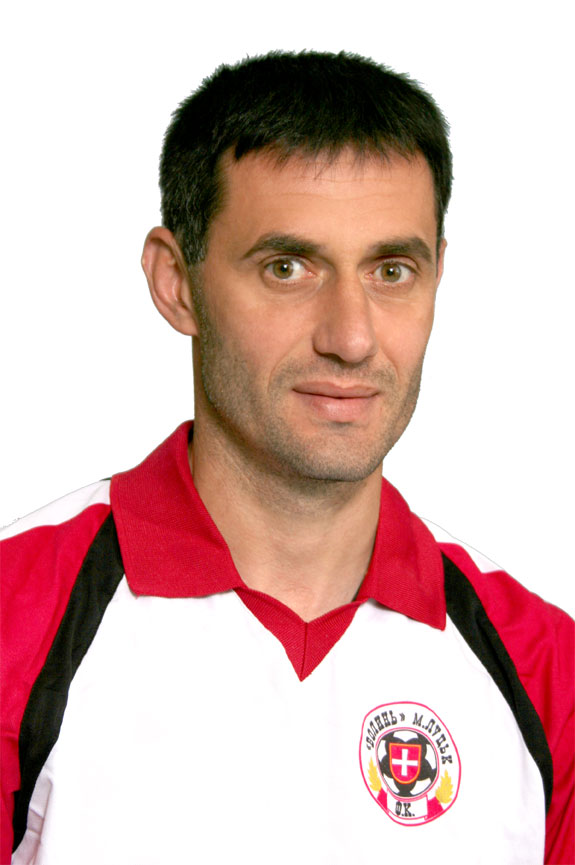

Personal information
- Full name: Roman Vasylyovych Maksymyuk
- Date of birth: 14 June 1974
- Place of birth: Bytkiv, Soviet Union (now Ukraine)
- Date of death: c. 30 January 2025 (aged 50)
- Height: 1.85 m (6 ft 1 in)
- Position: Left midfielder

Youth career
- DYuSSh Nadvirna

Senior career*
Years	Team	Apps	(Gls)
1991	Prykarpattya Ivano-Frankivsk	2	(0)
1992–1993	Beskyd Nadvirna		
1993	Krystal Chortkiv	12	(0)
1993–1994	Beskyd Nadvirna	17	(8)
1994–1995	CSKA-Borysfen Kyiv	1	(0)
1994–1995	→ CSKA Kyiv	37	(6)
1995–1997	Prykarpattya Ivano-Frankivsk	64	(2)
1995	→ Khutrovyk Tysmenytsia (loan)	6	(0)
1995	→ Krystal Chortkiv (loan)	4	(0)
1997	→ Krystal Chortkiv (loan)	2	(0)
1997	→ Tysmenytsia (loan)	3	(0)
1998–1999	Zenit Saint Petersburg	45	(10)
1998–1999	→ Zenit-2 St. Petersburg	2	(1)
1999–2000	Dynamo Kyiv	7	(0)
1999–2000	→ Dynamo-2 Kyiv	22	(3)
2001–2004	Dnipro Dnipropetrovsk	85	(11)
2000–2004	→ Dnipro-2 Dnipropetrovsk	9	(1)
2005–2008	Volyn Lutsk	90	(4)
2008	Atyrau	10	(1)
2009	Kazakhmys	23	(1)
2010	Chornomorets Odesa	2	(0)
2010–2011	Volyn Lutsk	21	(0)

International career
1998–2002	Ukraine	5	(0)

Managerial career
- 2013: Volyn Lutsk (U19 caretaker)
- 2014: Volyn Lutsk (U19 assistant)
- 2015: Veres Rivne (assistant)
- 2017: Ternopil
- 2018–2019: Votrans Lutsk
- * Club domestic league appearances and goals

Roman Vasylyovych Maksymyuk (Ukrainian: Роман Васильович Максимюк; 14 June 1974 – c. 30 January 2025) was a Ukrainian professional football manager and a former player.

== Career ==
Maksymyuk made his professional debut in the Soviet Second League B in 1991 for FC Prykarpattya Ivano-Frankivsk.

In December 2011, he announced his retirement from playing football.

== Military service and death ==
During the 2022 Russian invasion of Ukraine, in the fall of 2022, Maksymyuk joined the Armed Forces of Ukraine and participated in hostilities at the 25th Airborne Brigade "Sicheslav".

On 30 January 2025, he called his wife Vera to discuss his unit's encirclement by Russian forces during the Pokrovsk offensive. He was reported missing in the following months. DNA testing in October 2026 confirmed Maksymyuk was killed in the battle.

== Honours ==
- Ukrainian Premier League: 2000
- Russian Cup: 1999

== See also ==
- List of Ukrainian sports figures killed during the Russo-Ukrainian war
