= Sergey Korovushkin =

Russian footballer

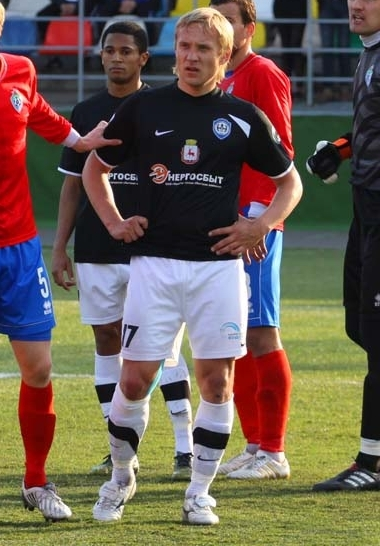
- Sergey Alexandrovich Korovushkin

Personal information
- Full name: Sergey Alexandrovich Korovushkin
- Date of birth: 26 January 1979 (age 47)
- Place of birth: Redkino, Tver Oblast, Russian SFSR, Soviet Union
- Height: 1.75 m (5 ft 9 in)
- Position: Forward

Youth career
- DYuSSh-7 Tver

Senior career*
Years	Team	Apps	(Gls)
1996	FC Volga Tver	21	(5)
1997–1998	PFC CSKA Moscow	11	(0)
1999	FC Torpedo-ZIL Moscow	19	(2)
2000–2001	FC Lokomotiv Nizhny Novgorod	10	(0)
2001	FC Volga Tver (amateur)		
2001–2004	FC Arsenal Tula	126	(53)
2005	FC Torpedo Moscow	7	(0)
2005–2007	FC Avangard Kursk	99	(17)
2008–2009	FC Baltika Kaliningrad	65	(11)
2010	FC Avangard Kursk	29	(7)
2011–2012	FC Nizhny Novgorod	20	(3)
2012–2013	FC Lokomotiv-2 Moscow	26	(0)
2013–2017	FC Volga Tver	108	(11)
- * Club domestic league appearances and goals as of 4 June 2017

Sergey Alexandrovich Korovushkin (Russian: Серге́й Алекса́ндрович Коро́вушкин; born 26 January 1979) is a former professional association football player from Russia.

He made his debut in the Russian Premier League in 1997 for PFC CSKA Moscow.

== Honours ==
- Russian Premier League runner-up: 1999
- Russian Second Division Zone West top scorer: 2003 (25 goals)
