= Andrei Kondrashov =

Russian footballer

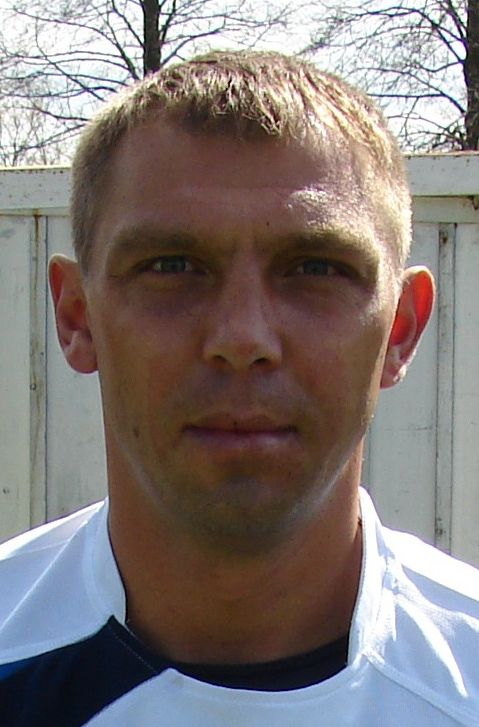

Personal information
- Full name: Andrei Yuryevich Kondrashov
- Date of birth: 7 August 1972 (age 54)
- Place of birth: Leningrad, Russian SFSR
- Height: 1.90 m (6 ft 3 in)
- Position: Defender

Team information
- Current team: FC Petrotrest Saint Petersburg (assistant)

Youth career
- 1989: FC Zenit St. Petersburg

Senior career*
Years	Team	Apps	(Gls)
1990–1993	FC Dynamo St. Petersburg	58	(0)
1994	FC Lokomotiv St. Petersburg	35	(0)
1995	FC Luch Vladivostok	40	(3)
1996–2000	FC Zenit St. Petersburg	84	(4)
2001	FC Uralan Elista	9	(0)
2002–2003	FC Dynamo St. Petersburg	53	(3)
2004	FC Petrotrest St. Petersburg	26	(10)
2005	FC Baltika Kaliningrad	29	(0)
2006	FC Khimki	37	(3)
2007	FC Dynamo St. Petersburg	21	(4)

International career
1998	Russia	1	(0)

Managerial career
- 2008: FC Dynamo St. Petersburg (assistant)
- 2009–2010: FC Baltika Kaliningrad (assistant)
- 2011–: FC Petrotrest Saint Petersburg (assistant)
- * Club domestic league appearances and goals

Andrei Yuryevich Kondrashov (Russian: Андрей Юрьевич Кондрашов; born 7 August 1972) is an association football coach and a former player.

== Honours ==
- Russian Cup winner: 1999.
- Russian Second Division Zone West best defender: 2004, 2005.

== International career ==
Kondrashov played his only game for Russia on 18 November 1998 in a friendly against Brazil.
