= Oleksandr Shutov =

Ukrainian footballer (born 1975)

Personal information
- Full name: Oleksandr Valentynovich Shutov
- Date of birth: 12 June 1975 (age 51)
- Place of birth: Balaklava, Ukrainian SSR
- Height: 1.75 m (5 ft 9 in)
- Position: Midfielder

Senior career*
Years	Team	Apps	(Gls)
1992–1993	Chaika Sevastopol	31	(2)
1993–1994	Tavriya Simferopol	1	(0)
1994–1995	Zorya-MALS Luhansk	19	(1)
1995	Rostselmash Rostov-on-Don	23	(0)
1996–1998	CSKA Moscow	33	(1)
1997–1998	→ Chornomorets Odessa (loan)	26	(2)
1999	Gornyak Balaklava	1	(1)
1999	Chernomorets Novorossiysk	12	(0)
2000	Slavia Mozyr	30	(4)
2001–2002	Amkar Perm	64	(8)
2003	Tom Tomsk	29	(0)
2004–2005	Amkar Perm	53	(5)
2006	Tavriya Simferopol	10	(1)
2010	Sevastopol	9	(1)

International career
1996	Ukraine U21	1	(0)
- * Club domestic league appearances and goals

Oleksandr Valentynovich Shutov (Ukrainian: Олександр Валентинович Шутов; Russian: Александр Валентинович Шутов; born 12 June 1975) is a retired Ukrainian professional footballer.

== Career ==
He made his professional debut in the Ukrainian First League 1992 in 1992 for FC Chaika Sevastopol. He played 3 games in the 1996–97 UEFA Cup for PFC CSKA Moscow.

== Honours ==
- Russian Premier League runner-up: 1998.
- Belarusian Premier League champion: 2000.
