= Ihor Kutyepov =

Ukrainian footballer (born 1965)

Personal information
- Full name: Ihor Mykolayovych Kutyepov
- Date of birth: 17 December 1965 (age 60)
- Place of birth: Pervomaiskyi, Ukrainian SSR
- Height: 1.86 m (6 ft 1 in)
- Position: Goalkeeper

Team information
- Current team: Metalist Kharkiv (youth academy director)

Youth career
- ????–1982: DYuSSh Kolos Pervomaiskyi

Senior career*
Years	Team	Apps	(Gls)
1982–1990	Metalist Kharkiv	96	(0)
1991–1994	Dynamo Kyiv	66	(0)
1994	→ Dynamo-2 Kyiv	3	(0)
1994–1996	Dynamo-Gazovik Tyumen	45	(0)
1996–1997	Dynamo Kyiv	4	(0)
1997	Tyumen	5	(0)
1997–1998	CSKA Moscow	23	(0)
1998–1999	Rostov	12	(0)
2000	CSKA Moscow	6	(0)

International career
1984	Soviet Union (U-18)		
1986	Soviet Union (U-21)		
1992–1993	Ukraine	4	(0)

Managerial career
- 2001–2003: CSKA Moscow (goalkeeping coach)
- 2003–2011: Metalist Kharkiv (youth school)
- 2011–: Metalist Kharkiv (youth academy director)
Medal record
Men's football
Representing Soviet Union
UEFA European U-19 Championships
Runner-up	1984 Soviet Union
- * Club domestic league appearances and goals

Ihor Mykolayovych Kutyepov (Ukrainian: Ігор Миколайович Кутєпов; born 17 December 1965) is a Soviet-Ukrainian former professional footballer who played as a goalkeeper. He became the first goalkeeper of the Ukraine national team. Starting for Metalist Kharkiv, Kutyepov later made the best of his career playing for Dynamo Kyiv and CSKA Moscow.

== Career ==
Kutyepov is a product of a sports school, which at that time was part of the Kolos sports society in Pervomaiskyi, Kharkiv Oblast. He joined Metalist in 1982 and, for a couple of years, played for their junior and reserve squads.

At the professional level, Kutyepov debuted on 17 March 1984 playing in the Soviet Vysshaya Liga for Metalist Kharkiv in a Round 2 home game against Zenit Leningrad, which ended in a 1:1 tie. That season, Kutyepov played as a backup for Yuriy Syvukha.

On 7 September 1988, Kutyepov made his first appearance at European club level during the 1988–89 European Cup Winners' Cup when Metalist was visiting FK Borac Banja Luka in the competition's first round.

== Honours ==
- Ukrainian Premier League: 1993, 1994, 1997
- Ukrainian Cup: 1993, 1996
- Russian Premier League runner-up: 1998
- Soviet Cup: 1988
