= Aleksandr Gryazin =

Russian footballer

Personal information
- Full name: Aleksandr Aleksandrovich Gryazin
- Date of birth: 23 August 1974 (age 52)
- Place of birth: Lyubertsy, Russian SFSR
- Height: 1.80 m (5 ft 11 in)
- Positions: Midfielder; forward

Senior career*
Years	Team	Apps	(Gls)
1992–1994	PFC CSKA-d Moscow	84	(22)
1994	Hapoel Bat Yam F.C.		
1995	FC Krylia Sovetov Samara	24	(2)
1996–2000	FC Saturn Ramenskoye	144	(28)
2001	FC Torpedo-ZIL Moscow	11	(1)
2001	FC Metallurg Lipetsk	17	(1)
2002	FC Rubin Kazan	10	(0)
2004	FC Salyut-Energiya Belgorod	7	(0)
2005	FC Spartak-MZhK Ryazan	0	(0)
- * Club domestic league appearances and goals

Aleksandr Aleksandrovich Gryazin (Russian: Александр Александрович Грязин; born 23 August 1974) is a Russian retired professional footballer. He made his professional debut in the Russian Second Division in 1992 for PFC CSKA-d Moscow.
