= Viktor Bulatov =

Russian footballer

Personal information
- Full name: Viktor Gennadyevich Bulatov
- Date of birth: 22 January 1972 (age 54)
- Place of birth: Chelyabinsk, Russian SFSR
- Height: 1.75 m (5 ft 9 in)
- Position: Midfielder

Team information
- Current team: Dynamo Kirov (manager)

Youth career
- SDYuShOR-3 Chelyabinsk
- FShM Moscow

Senior career*
Years	Team	Apps	(Gls)
1990	Zvezda Moscow	8	(0)
1990–1992	Volgar Astrakhan	94	(17)
1993	Dimitrovgrad	19	(17)
1994	Kirovets-Torpedo Kopeysk		
1994	Dynamo Stavropol	14	(3)
1995–1997	Krylia Sovetov Samara	87	(12)
1998	Torpedo Moscow	30	(9)
1999–2001	Spartak Moscow	87	(7)
2002–2003	Krylia Sovetov Samara	38	(0)
2004–2005	Terek Grozny	51	(1)
2006–2007	Alania Vladivkavkaz	38	(2)
2007	Sibir Novosibirsk	0	(0)
2007–2008	Astana	11	(0)
2008	SKA-Energia Khabarovsk	15	(0)
2009	Torpedo Moscow	8	(1)
Total		526	(81)

International career
1998–2001	Russia	6	(0)

Managerial career
- 2008: SKA-Energia Khabarovsk (assistant)
- 2008: Nika Moscow (youth team)
- 2009: Nika Moscow
- 2009: Chernomorets Novorossiysk (assistant)
- 2010–2012: Dnepr Smolensk
- 2012: Khimki (assistant)
- 2012–2014: Zenit Penza
- 2014–2015: Arsenal Tula (reserves)
- 2015–2016: Arsenal Tula
- 2016–2017: Torpedo Moscow
- 2018: Chayka Peschanokopskoye
- 2018–2020: Spartak-2 Moscow
- 2020: Krasny
- 2021: Khimik Dzerzhinsk
- 2021–2022: Noah
- 2022–2023: Chelyabinsk
- 2023–: Dynamo Kirov
- * Club domestic league appearances and goals

Viktor Gennadyevich Bulatov (Russian: Виктор Геннадьевич Булатов; born 22 January 1972) is a Russian football coach and a former Russian international football player. He is the manager of Dynamo Kirov.

== Playing career ==
Bulatov spent the prime years of his career at Spartak Moscow. Apart from Spartak, Bulatov played for various Russian clubs, including Torpedo Moscow, Terek Grozny, Alania Vladikavkaz and had two spells at Krylia Sovetov.
In summer 2007 as an experienced player he moved to Kazakh champions Astana to strengthen the club in its forthcoming Champions League journey.

On international level, Bulatov made his debut for Russia national football team in a 1998 friendly match defeat to Brazil and played his last game in 2001, against Greece.

== Honours ==
=== Player ===
- Russian Premier League champion: 1999, 2000, 2001.
- Russian Cup winner: 2004.
- Russian Cup finalist: 2004 (played in the early stages of the 2003/04 competition for FC Krylia Sovetov Samara, who lost in the final to FC Terek Grozny, for which he was playing at the time).

=== Manager ===
- Russian Second League Division B Zone 4 winner: 2024.

== European club competitions ==
- UEFA Champions League 1999–2000 with FC Spartak Moscow: 7 games, 1 goal.
- UEFA Cup 1999–2000 with FC Spartak Moscow: 2 games.
- UEFA Champions League 2000–01 with FC Spartak Moscow: 8 games.
- UEFA Champions League 2001–02 with FC Spartak Moscow: 6 games.
- UEFA Intertoto Cup 2002 with FC Krylia Sovetov Samara: 4 games.
- UEFA Cup 2004–05 with FC Terek Grozny: 4 goals.
