= Vladimir Isakov (footballer) =

Russian footballer

Personal information
- Full name: Vladimir Nikolayevich Isakov
- Date of birth: 12 October 1979 (age 47)
- Height: 1.83 m (6 ft 0 in)
- Position: Defender

Senior career*
| Years | Team | Apps | (Gls) |
| 1997 | PFC CSKA-d Moscow | 14 | (0) |
| 1998 | PFC CSKA Moscow | 1 | (0) |
| 1998–1999 | PFC CSKA-2 Moscow | 41 | (3) |
| 1999 | FC Chernomorets Novorossiysk | 11 | (0) |
| 2000 | FC Volgar-Gazprom Astrakhan | 1 | (0) |
| 2001 | FC Metallurg-Zapsib Novokuznetsk | 10 | (0) |
| 2001–2002 | FC Krasnoznamensk | 0 | (0) |
| 2003–2004 | FC Zvezda Irkutsk | 31 | (3) |
- * Club domestic league appearances and goals

Vladimir Nikolayevich Isakov (Russian: Владимир Николаевич Исаков; born 12 October 1979) is a former Russian professional footballer.

== Club career ==
He made his professional debut in the Russian Third Division in 1997 for PFC CSKA-d Moscow.

== Honours ==
- Russian Premier League runner-up: 1998.
