= Sergey Shustikov (footballer, born 1970) =

Russian footballer (1970–2016)

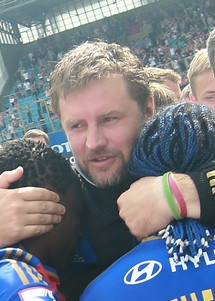
- Shustikov as CSKA Moscow coach

Personal information
- Full name: Sergey Viktorovich Shustikov
- Date of birth: 30 September 1970
- Place of birth: Moscow, Russian SFSR, Soviet Union
- Date of death: 7 January 2016 (aged 45)
- Height: 1.84 m (6 ft 0 in)
- Position: Midfielder

Senior career*
| Years | Team | Apps | (Gls) |
| 1988–1996 | Torpedo Moscow | 145 | (4) |
| 1996 | Racing de Santander | 8 | (0) |
| 1997–1998 | CSKA Moscow | 32 | (1) |
| 1998–2000 | Racing de Santander | 38 | (1) |
| 2000–2001 | Osasuna | 0 | (0) |
| 2001–2004 | FC Moscow | 73 | (0) |
| Total | | 296 | (6) |

International career
| 1992 | CIS | 2 | (0) |

Managerial career
- 2005: FC Moscow (reserves assistant)
- 2005–2007: FC Moscow (assistant)
- 2008–2009: Krylia Sovetov Samara (assistant)
- 2009–2014: CSKA Moscow (assistant)
- 2014–2015: Solyaris Moscow
- * Club domestic league appearances and goals

Sergey Viktorovich Shustikov (Russian: Сергей Викторович Шустиков; 30 September 1970 – 7 January 2016) was a Russian football coach and player who managed FC Solyaris Moscow from 2014 until his death. He was the son of Viktor Shustikov and the father of Sergey Shustikov.

== International career ==
Shustikov made his debut for CIS on 2 February 1992 in a friendly against the United States.
