= Aleksei Babenko =

Russian footballer

Personal information
- Full name: Aleksei Anatolyevich Babenko
- Date of birth: August 1, 1972 (age 54)
- Place of birth: Gelendzhik, Russian SFSR
- Height: 1.79 m (5 ft 10 1/2 in)
- Positions: Forward; midfielder

Senior career*
Years	Team	Apps	(Gls)
1989	FC Torpedo Naberezhnye Chelny	22	(2)
1990–1992	FC Zvezda Gorodishche	73	(8)
1993	FC KAMAZ Naberezhnye Chelny	10	(2)
1993–1994	FC Zvezda Gorodishche	30	(6)
1995–1997	FC KAMAZ-Chally Naberezhnye Chelny	70	(15)
1998	PFC CSKA Moscow	11	(0)
1999	FC Metallurg Lipetsk	34	(10)
2000	FC Spartak-Chukotka Moscow	6	(0)
2000	FC Access-Esil	11	(5)
2001	FC Khimki	15	(2)
2002	FC Dynamo Stavropol	32	(8)
2003	FC Lisma-Mordovia Saransk	33	(8)
2004	FC Anzhi Makhachkala	6	(0)
2005–2006	FC Spartak-UGP Anapa	19	(9)
- * Club domestic league appearances and goals

Aleksei Anatolyevich Babenko (Russian: Алексей Анатольевич Бабенко; born 1 August 1972) is a Russian retired professional footballer.

He made his professional debut in the Soviet Second League in 1989 for FC Torpedo Naberezhnye Chelny. He played 5 games and scored 3 goals in the UEFA Intertoto Cup 1996 for FC KAMAZ-Chally Naberezhnye Chelny.

== Honours ==
- Russian Premier League runner-up: 1998.
