= Roman Shapkin =

Russian footballer and coach

Personal information
- Full name: Roman Viktorovich Shapkin
- Date of birth: 27 May 1971 (age 55)
- Place of birth: Orekhovo-Zuyevo, Moscow Oblast, Russian SFSR
- Height: 1.91 m (6 ft 3 in)
- Position: Defender

Senior career*
Years	Team	Apps	(Gls)
1991–1992	FC Znamya Truda Orekhovo-Zuyevo	64	(3)
1993	FC Torpedo Moscow	0	(0)
1993–1994	FC Orekhovo Orekhovo-Zuyevo	49	(0)
1994–1995	FC Kolos Krasnodar	5	(0)
1996–1998	FC Spartak-Orekhovo Orekhovo-Zuyevo	104	(15)
1999	FC Saturn-2 Ramenskoye	2	(0)
1999–2003	FC Znamya Truda Orekhovo-Zuyevo	154	(11)
2004–2008	FC Dynamo Bryansk	116	(5)
2008–2009	FC Znamya Truda Orekhovo-Zuyevo	36	(8)

Managerial career
- 2009: FC Znamya Truda Orekhovo-Zuyevo (caretaker)
- 2010: FC Znamya Truda Orekhovo-Zuyevo (director)
- 2017–2021: FC Znamya Truda Orekhovo-Zuyevo (U19)
- 2021: FC Znamya Truda Orekhovo-Zuyevo (caretaker)
- * Club domestic league appearances and goals

Roman Viktorovich Shapkin (Russian: Роман Викторович Шапкин; born 27 May 1971) is a Russian professional football coach and a former player.

== Club career ==
He played 7 seasons in the Russian Football National League for FC Spartak-Orekhovo Orekhovo-Zuyevo and FC Dynamo Bryansk.
