= Vitaliy Baranov (footballer) =

Russian footballer

Personal information
- Full name: Vitaliy Aleksandrovich Baranov
- Date of birth: 25 January 1980 (age 46)
- Place of birth: Izhevsk, Russian SFSR
- Height: 1.90 m (6 ft 3 in)
- Position: Goalkeeper

Senior career*
Years	Team	Apps	(Gls)
1996–1997	FC Zenit Izhevsk	48	(0)
1998–2000	PFC CSKA-2 Moscow	84	(0)
2000	PFC CSKA Moscow	1	(0)
2001	FC Khimki	1	(0)
2001	PFC CSKA Moscow (reserves)		
2002–2005	FC Gazovik-Gazprom Izhevsk	27	(0)
2006–2007	FC Torpedo-RG Moscow	49	(0)

International career
2000	Russia U-21	2	(0)
- * Club domestic league appearances and goals

Vitaliy Aleksandrovich Baranov (Russian: Виталий Александрович Баранов; born 25 January 1980) is a retired Russian professional football player.

== Career ==
He played his only Russian Premier League game on the last game day of the 2000 season in a 4–3 victory by PFC CSKA Moscow over FC Lokomotiv Moscow, saving a penalty kick by Oleg Teryokhin.

After he retired from playing, Baranov become a football coach. He was appointed the goalkeeper's coach for FC Zenit-Izhevsk in 2018.
