= Aleksandr Gerasimov (footballer) =

Russian footballer

Personal information
- Full name: Aleksandr Viktorovich Gerasimov
- Date of birth: 12 November 1969 (age 56)
- Place of birth: Lyubertsy, Russian SFSR
- Height: 1.79 m (5 ft 10 1/2 in)
- Positions: Forward; midfielder

Senior career*
| Years | Team | Apps | (Gls) |
| 1990 | FC Saturn Ramenskoye | 32 | (11) |
| 1991 | FC Prometey Lyubertsy | 42 | (13) |
| 1992 | FC Znamya Truda Orekhovo-Zuyevo | 37 | (12) |
| 1993–1995 | FC Dynamo-Gazovik Tyumen | 92 | (10) |
| 1996 | FC Chernomorets Novorossiysk | 27 | (2) |
| 1997 | FC Shinnik Yaroslavl | 32 | (9) |
| 1998 | PFC CSKA Moscow | 24 | (1) |
| 1999 | FC Krylia Sovetov Samara | 2 | (0) |
| 2000 | FC Lokomotiv Nizhny Novgorod | 11 | (0) |
- * Club domestic league appearances and goals

Aleksandr Viktorovich Gerasimov (Russian: Александр Викторович Герасимов; born 12 November 1969) is a Russian retired professional footballer. He made his professional debut in the Soviet Second League B in 1990 for FC Saturn Ramenskoye.

== Honours ==
- Russian Premier League runner-up: 1998.
