= Sergei Filippenkov =

Russian footballer

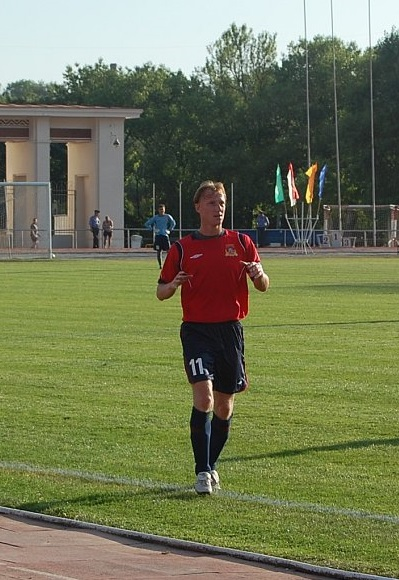

Personal information
- Full name: Sergei Aleksandrovich Filippenkov
- Date of birth: 2 August 1971
- Place of birth: Smolensk, Russian SFSR, Soviet Union
- Date of death: 15 October 2015 (aged 44)
- Place of death: Penza, Russian Federation
- Height: 1.81 m (5 ft 11 in)
- Position: Midfielder

Senior career*
Years	Team	Apps	(Gls)
1992–1994	FC Iskra Smolensk	77	(5)
1995–1997	FC CSK VVS-Kristall Smolensk	104	(19)
1998–2001	PFC CSKA Moscow	100	(17)
2002	FC Chernomorets Novorossiysk	19	(4)
2003	Kristall Smolensk	17	(1)
2003	FC Dynamo Saint Petersburg	10	(0)
2004	FC Arsenal Tula	27	(2)
2005	Zhenis Astana	13	(1)
2005–2007	FC Dynamo Bryansk	90	(11)
2008	FC Metallurg Lipetsk	26	(1)
2009–2010	FC Dnepr Smolensk	52	(1)
Total		535	(62)

International career
1998	Russia	1	(0)

Managerial career
- 2011–2012: FC Dnepr Smolensk (assistant)
- 2013–2014: FC Zenit Penza (assistant)
- 2014–2015: FC Zenit Penza
- * Club domestic league appearances and goals

Sergei Aleksandrovich Filippenkov (Russian: Серге́й Александрович Филиппенков; 2 August 1971 – 15 October 2015) was a Russian football manager and player.

Filippenkov died of a heart attack during a friendly match between former players on 15 October 2015.

== Honours ==
- Russian Premier League runner-up: 1998.
- Russian Premier League bronze: 1999.
- Russian Cup runner-up: 2000.

== International career ==
Filippenkov made his debut for Russia on 11 November 1998 in a friendly against Brazil.
