= 1999 PFC CSKA Moscow season =

CSKA
1999 season
- Manager: Oleg Dolmatov
- Stadium: Dynamo Stadium; Grigory Fedotov Stadium
- Top Division: 3rd
- Russian Cup: Semi-final vs Zenit St.Petersburg
- Russian Cup: Continued in 2000
- UEFA Champions League: Second qualifying round vs Molde

The 1999 CSKA season was the club's eighth season in the Russian Top Division, the highest tier of association football in Russia.

== Squad ==
As of match played 13 November 1999

Name	Nationality	Position	Date of birth (age)	Signed from	Signed in	Contract ends	Apps.	Goals
Goalkeepers
Vitali Baranov	(Russia)	GK	25 January 1980 (aged 19)	Zenit Izhevsk	1998		0	0
Dmitri Goncharov	(Russia)	GK	15 April 1975 (aged 24)	Lokomotiv Nizhny Novgorod	1999		25	0
Andrei Novosadov	(Russia)	GK	27 March 1972 (aged 27)	KAMAZ	1993		81	0
Defenders
Maksim Bokov	(Russia)	DF	29 August 1973 (aged 26)	Zenit St.Petersburg	1997		98	2
Oleg Kornaukhov	(Russia)	DF	14 January 1975 (aged 24)	Shinnik Yaroslavl	1998		63	4
Valeri Minko	(Russia)	DF	8 August 1971 (aged 28)	Dynamo Barnaul	1989		230	12
Denis Pervushin	(Russia)	DF	18 January 1977 (aged 22)	TRASKO Moscow	1996		52	0
Andrei Tsaplin	(Russia)	DF	22 January 1977 (aged 22)	Academy	1996		57	1
Yevgeni Varlamov	(Russia)	DF	25 July 1975 (aged 24)	KAMAZ	1998		57	8
Denis Yevsikov	(Russia)	DF	19 February 1981 (aged 18)	Academy	1999		3	0
Midfielders
Oleg Șișchin	(Moldova)	MF	7 January 1975 (aged 24)	Constructorul Chișinău	1999		19	4
Igor Aksyonov	(Russia)	MF	11 August 1977 (aged 22)	Arsenal Tula	1999		18	0
Sergei Filippenkov	(Russia)	MF	2 August 1971 (aged 28)	CSK VVS-Kristall Smolensk	1998		65	14
Aleksandr Grishin	(Russia)	MF	18 November 1971 (aged 26)	Dynamo Moscow	1997		147	25
Artyom Kovalenko	(Russia)	MF	6 August 1981 (aged 18)	Academy	1999		1	0
Aleksandr Lebedev	(Russia)	MF	1 April 1981 (aged 18)	Academy	1999		1	0
Viktor Navochenko	(Russia)	MF	21 August 1970 (aged 29)	Baltika Kaliningrad	1999		16	1
Sergei Rodin	(Russia)	MF	24 January 1981 (aged 18)	Academy	1999		2	0
Aleksei Savelyev	(Russia)	MF	10 April 1977 (aged 22)	Torpedo Moscow	1997		72	6
Sergei Semak	(Russia)	MF	27 February 1976 (aged 23)	Asmaral Moscow	1994		168	43
Aleksandr Shvetsov	(Russia)	MF	17 December 1980 (aged 18)	Academy	1998		0	0
Aleksei Smetanin	(Russia)	MF	19 March 1981 (aged 18)	Academy	1999		0	0
Marek Hollý	(Slovakia)	MF	20 August 1973 (aged 26)	Lokomotiv Nizhny Novgorod	1999		18	2
Dmitri Khomukha	(Turkmenistan)	MF	23 August 1969 (aged 30)	Zenit St.Petersburg	1997		103	23
Maksym Biletskyi	(Ukraine)	MF	7 January 1980 (aged 19)	Academy	1998		0	0
Forwards
Magomed Adiyev	(Russia)	FW	30 June 1977 (aged 21)	Anzhi Makhachkala	1999		5	0
Vladimir Kulik	(Russia)	FW	18 February 1972 (aged 26)	Zenit St.Petersburg	1997		102	46
Aleksandr Suchkov	(Russia)	FW	29 February 1980 (aged 18)	Fabus Bronnitsy	1998		3	0
Out on loan
Left During the Season
Ante Pešić	(Croatia)	DF	27 August 1974 (aged 24)	HNK Šibenik	1999		4	0
Andrei Krasnopjorov	(Estonia)	DF	5 December 1973 (aged 24)	loan from Lantana Tallinn	1999		1	0
Aleksandr Borodkin	(Russia)	DF	1 October 1971 (aged 28)	Tyumen	1998		29	2
Vladimir Isakov	(Russia)	DF	12 October 1979 (aged 19)	Academy	1998		1	0
Maksim Nizovtsev	(Kazakhstan)	MF	9 September 1972 (aged 26)	Baltika Kaliningrad	1999		3	0
Goran Gutalj	(Federal Republic of Yugoslavia)	FW	12 November 1969 (aged 28)	NK Mura	1999		3	1

== Transfers ==
In: Note: Flags indicate national team as defined under FIFA eligibility rules; some limited exceptions apply. Players may hold more than one non-FIFA nationality.

No.	Pos.	Nation	Player
—	GK	RUS	Dmitri Goncharov (from (Russia) Lokomotiv Nizhny Novgorod)
—	DF	CRO	Ante Pešić (from (Croatia) HNK Šibenik)
—	DF	RUS	Igor Aksyonov (from (Russia) Arsenal Tula)
—	DF	RUS	Denis Pervushin (loan return from (Russia) Sokol Saratov)
—	MF	MDA	Oleg Șișchin (from (Moldova) Constructorul Chișinău)
—	MF	SVK	Marek Hollý (from (Russia) Lokomotiv Nizhny Novgorod)
—	MF	EST	Andrei Krasnopjorov (loan from (Estonia) Lantana Tallinn)
—	MF	KAZ	Maksim Nizovtsev (from (Russia) Baltika Kaliningrad)
—	MF	RUS	Viktor Navochenko (from (Russia) Baltika Kaliningrad)
—	FW	RUS	Magomed Adiyev (from (Russia) Anzhi Makhachkala)
—	FW	YUG	Goran Gutalj (from (Slovenia) NK Mura)

Out: Note: Flags indicate national team as defined under FIFA eligibility rules; some limited exceptions apply. Players may hold more than one non-FIFA nationality.

No.	Pos.	Nation	Player
—	DF	CRO	Ante Pešić (to (Croatia) HNK Vukovar '91)
—	DF	EST	Andrei Krasnopjorov (loan return to (Estonia) Lantana Tallinn)
—	DF	RUS	Aleksandr Borodkin (to (Russia) Torpedo-ZIL Moscow)
—	DF	RUS	Vladimir Isakov (to (Russia) Chernomorets Novorossiysk)
—	MF	KAZ	Maksim Nizovtsev (to (Russia) Baltika Kaliningrad)
—	MF	UKR	Oleksandr Shutov (to (Ukraine) Gornyak Balaklava)
—	FW	RUS	Aleksei Babenko (to (Russia) Metallurg Lipetsk)
—	FW	RUS	Aleksandr Gerasimov (to (Russia) Krylia Sovetov)
—	FW	RUS	Sergei Kulichenko (to (Estonia) Lantana Tallinn)
—	FW	RUS	Sergey Korovushkin (to (Russia) Torpedo-ZIL Moscow)
—	FW	YUG	Goran Gutalj (to (Slovenia) ND Gorica)

== Competitions ==
=== Top Division ===
==== Results by round ====
Round	1	2	3	4	5	6	7	8	9	10	11	12	13	14	15	16	17	18	19	20	21	22	23	24	25	26	27	28	29	30
Ground	H	A	H	A	H	A	H	H	A	H	A	H	A	H	A	A	H	H	A	H	A	A	H	A	H	A	H	A	H	A
Result	D	W	W	D	D	L	W	W	W	D	W	W	D	W	L	D	W	W	D	L	L	D	W	D	W	W	W	L	W	D

Updated to match(es) played on 8 November 1999. Source: See Results
A = Away; H = Home; W = Win; D = Draw; L = Loss

==== Results ====
3 April 1999 1	CSKA Moscow	1 – 1	Krylia Sovetov	Moscow
15:00 MSK (UTC+4)	Nizovtsev (yellow card) 4'; Kulik 86'	Report	Safronov (yellow card) 25' (yellow-red card) 64'	Stadium: Grigory Fedotov Stadium; Referee: Yu.Makarov

11 April 1999 2	Alania Vladikavkaz	0 – 1	CSKA Moscow	Vladikavkaz
16:30 MSK (UTC+4)	Batista (yellow card) 57'; Tsereteli (yellow card) 72'	Report	Borodkin (yellow card) 76'; Khomukha 78' (pen.)	Stadium: Republican Spartak Stadium; Referee: Taras Bezubyak

17 April 1999 3	CSKA Moscow	2 – 0	Uralan Elista	Moscow
17:00 MSK (UTC+4)	Filippenkov 10' (pen.); Semak 77'	Report	Alekseyev (yellow card) 10'; Tutychenko (yellow card) 15'; O.Tereshchenko (yellow card) 21' (yellow-red card) 53'; Ivanov (yellow card) 50'; Tsveiba (yellow card) 78'	Stadium: Grigory Fedotov Stadium; Referee: Sergey Lapochkin

25 April 1999 4	Shinnik Yaroslavl	0 – 0	CSKA Moscow	Yaroslavl
18:00 MSK (UTC+4)	Snytko 40'; Rezantsev (yellow card) 49'; Guteyev (yellow card) 79'	Report	Kornaukhov (yellow card) 61'; Borodkin (yellow card) 72'	Stadium: Shinnik Stadium; Referee: G.Yarygin

2 May 1999 5	CSKA Moscow	2 – 2	Zenit St.Petersburg	Moscow
17:00 MSK (UTC+4)	Kulik 25', 44'; Aksyonov (yellow card) 45'; Bokov (yellow card) 54'; Navochenko (yellow card) 60'; Varlamov (yellow card) 76'	Report	Panov 35'; Vernydub (yellow card) 44'; Popovych 54'	Stadium: Grigory Fedotov Stadium; Referee: S.Andreev

9 May 1999 6	Spartak Moscow	1 – 0	CSKA Moscow	Moscow
16:30 MSK (UTC+4)	Shirko 9'	Report	Grishin (yellow card) 65'	Stadium: Lokomotiv Stadium; Referee: Sergei Khusainov

15 May 1999 7	CSKA Moscow	5 – 2	Chernomorets Novorossiysk	Moscow
17:00 MSK (UTC+4)	Semak 3', 41', 65'; Minko (yellow card) 15'; Varlamov 18'; Filippenkov 53'	Report	Berezner 72'; Geraschenko 88'	Stadium: Grigory Fedotov Stadium; Referee: G.Kulichenkov

22 May 1999 8	CSKA Moscow	5 – 1	Rotor Volgograd	Moscow
17:00 MSK (UTC+4)	Varlamov 20', 81'; Semak 29'; Grishin (yellow card) 30'; Kornaukhov (yellow card) 35'; Filippenkov 50', 72'	Report	Matiola (yellow card) 7'; Kopnin (yellow card) 42'; Yesipov 87'	Stadium: Grigory Fedotov Stadium; Referee: Nikolai Ivanov

29 May 1999 9	Rostselmash	1 – 3	CSKA Moscow	Rostov-on-Don
18:00 MSK (UTC+4)	Matveyev (yellow card) 33'; Khankeyev 38'; Borovskoy (yellow card) 52'; Guschin (yellow card) 63'	Report	Grishin (yellow card) 17'; Varlamov 33'; Minko 51'; Semak 62'	Stadium: Olimp-2; Referee: G.Yarygin

13 June 1999 10	CSKA Moscow	0 – 0	Torpedo Moscow	Moscow
19:00 MSK (UTC+4)	Kornaukhov (yellow card) 54'	Report	Durnev (yellow card) 56'; Arlowski (yellow card) 85'	Stadium: Grigory Fedotov Stadium; Referee: M.Khodyrev

19 June 1999 11	Lokomotiv Nizhny Novgorod	0 – 2	CSKA Moscow	Nizhny Novgorod
17:00 MSK (UTC+4)	Nizhegorodov (yellow card) 60'; Dzamikhov (yellow card) 64'; Gorelov (yellow card) 64'; Vlasov (yellow card) 72'	Report	Khomukha 72'; Savelyev 89'	Stadium: Lokomotiv Stadium; Referee: Sergey Lapochkin

23 June 1999 12	CSKA Moscow	1 – 0	Saturn Ramenskoye	Moscow
18:00 MSK (UTC+4)	Filippenkov 40' (yellow card) 72'; Savelyev (yellow card) 78'	Report	Kurayev (yellow card) 21'	Stadium: Grigory Fedotov Stadium; Referee: Lom-Ali Ibragimov

27 June 1999 13	Zhemchuzhina-Sochi	2 – 2	CSKA Moscow	Sochi
18:30 MSK (UTC+4)	Bondarev (yellow card) 33'; Kalaydzhan 42'; Bondaruk (yellow card) 50'; Gogrichiani 77'; Tarba (yellow card) 88'	Report	Filippenkov 49'; Savelyev 67'; Borodkin (yellow card) 85'	Stadium: Sochi Central Stadium; Referee: S.Gusev

3 July 1999 14	CSKA Moscow	1 – 0	Lokomotiv Moscow	Moscow
19:00 MSK (UTC+4)	Tsaplin (yellow card) 38'; Bokov (yellow card) 65'; Șișchin 73'	Report	Bulykin (yellow card) 47'; Lavrik (yellow card) 60'; Cherevchenko (yellow card) 63'; Loskov (yellow card) 74'	Stadium: Dynamo Stadium; Referee: F.Erzimanov

7 July 1999 15	Dynamo Moscow	1 – 0	CSKA Moscow	Moscow
19:00 MSK (UTC+4)	Teryokhin 28'; Bulatov (yellow card) 61'	Report		Stadium: Dynamo Stadium; Referee: S.Khusainov

11 July 1999 16	Zenit St.Petersburg	1 – 1	CSKA Moscow	Saint Petersburg
17:00 MSK (UTC+4)	Panov 45'; Maksymyuk (yellow card) 63'	Report	Bokov (yellow card) 42'; Khomukha (yellow card) 67' (goal) 85' (pen.); Șișchin (yellow card) 78'; Savelyev (yellow card) 88'	Stadium: Petrovsky Stadium; Referee: Yuri Chebotaryov

14 July 1999 17	CSKA Moscow	4 – 1	Alania Vladikavkaz	Moscow
19:00 MSK (UTC+4)	Kulik 24'; Khomukha 55' (pen.), 69'; Grishin (yellow card) 60'; Semak 72'	Report	Žutautas (yellow card) 4'; Tsereteli (yellow card) 8'; Tedeyev (yellow card) 56'; Demetradze 61'; Fyodorov (red card) 85'	Stadium: Grigory Fedotov Stadium; Referee: Sergey Lapochkin

18 July 1999 18	CSKA Moscow	5 – 0	Shinnik Yaroslavl	Moscow
19:00 MSK (UTC+4)	Kornaukhov (yellow card) 24'; Pešić (yellow card) 40'; Khomukha 66'; Gutalj 79'; Kulik 80'; Semak 84', 89'	Report	Makhmutov (yellow card) 28' (yellow-red card) 68'; Novgorodov (yellow card) 41'; Bobrov (yellow card) 49'; Snytko (yellow card) 58'	Stadium: Grigory Fedotov Stadium; Referee: Yu.Makarov

21 July 1999 19	Uralan Elista	1 – 1	CSKA Moscow	Elista
18:00 MSK (UTC+4)	Jefferson 23' (yellow card) 40'; Kozlov (yellow card) 24'	Report	Kulik 3'; Khomukha (yellow card) 33'; Filippenkov (yellow card) 37'	Stadium: Uralan Stadium; Referee: G.Kulichenkov

15 August 1999 20	CSKA Moscow	0 – 4	Spartak Moscow	Moscow
18:00 MSK (UTC+4)	Filippenkov (yellow card) 18'; Varlamov (yellow card) 29'; Aksyonov (yellow card) 35'; Bokov (yellow card) 65'	Report	Baranov 19'; Kovtun (yellow card) 20'; Parfenov (yellow card) 23'; Titov 66'; Bezrodny (yellow card) 68' (goal) 79', 83'	Stadium: Dynamo Stadium; Referee: S.Anokhin

21 August 1999 21	Chernomorets Novorossiysk	2 – 1	CSKA Moscow	Novorossiysk
18:00 MSK (UTC+4)	Kutsenko 9', 40'; Spanderashvili (yellow card) 23'; Mayorov (yellow card) 82'	Report	Pervushin (yellow card) 28'; Khomukha 48' (pen.)	Stadium: Central Stadium; Referee: S.Gusev

28 August 1999 22	Rotor Volgograd	1 – 1	CSKA Moscow	Volgograd
19:00 MSK (UTC+4)	Berketov (yellow card) 34'; Veretennikov 63'; Osinov (penalty missed) 86'	Report	Novosadov (yellow card) 28'; Tsaplin (yellow card) 39'; Minko (yellow card) 50'; Kulik 80'	Stadium: Central Profsoyuz Stadium; Referee: Nikolai Levnikov

11 September 1999 23	CSKA Moscow	2 – 0	Rostselmash	Moscow
16:00 MSK (UTC+4)	Semak 53'; Kulik 59'	Report	Matveyev (yellow card) 6'; Kupriyanov 34'; Prudius (yellow card) 47'	Stadium: Grigory Fedotov Stadium; Referee: Yu.Makarov

18 September 1999 24	Torpedo Moscow	2 – 2	CSKA Moscow	Moscow
17:00 MSK (UTC+4)	Kamoltsev 5'; Malay (yellow card) 22'; Gashkin 30'; Shkapenko (yellow card) 45'	Report	Varlamov 20'; Bokov (yellow card) 54'; Pešić (yellow card) 68'; Semak 79'; Kornaukhov (yellow card) 87'	Stadium: Luzhniki Stadium; Referee: A.Butenko

25 September 1999 25	CSKA Moscow	3 – 1	Lokomotiv Nizhny Novgorod	Moscow
16:00 MSK (UTC+4)	Kulik 20', 79'; Șișchin 28'; Savelyev (yellow card) 31'; Tsaplin (yellow card) 81'	Report	Kuznetsov (yellow card) 29'; Nizhegorodov (yellow card) 51'; Vyazmikin (yellow card) 73' (goal) 89'; Urbánek (yellow card) 74'; Vlasov (yellow card) 81'	Stadium: Grigory Fedotov Stadium; Referee: N.Frolov

2 October 1999 26	Saturn Ramenskoye	2 – 3	CSKA Moscow	Ramenskoye
14:00 MSK (UTC+4)	Menshchikov 41'; Medvedev 66' (yellow card) 72'	Report	Kulik 53', 65'; Minko (yellow card) 62'; Semak 71'; Șișchin (yellow card) 90'	Stadium: Saturn Stadium; Referee: Sergey Lapochkin

16 October 1999 27	CSKA Moscow	3 – 0	Zhemchuzhina-Sochi	Moscow
15:00 MSK (UTC+4)	Kulik 11', 54'; Filippenkov 14'; Șișchin (yellow card) 44'; Navochenko (yellow card) 64'	Report	Bondaruk (yellow card) 30'	Stadium: Grigory Fedotov Stadium; Referee: Nikolai Levnikov

24 October 1999 28	Lokomotiv Moscow	1 – 0	CSKA Moscow	Moscow
19:00 MSK (UTC+4)	Solomatin (yellow card) 14'; Lavrik (yellow card) 34'; Chugainov 42'; Cherevchenko (yellow card) 62'	Report	Filippenkov (yellow card) 15'; Aksyonov (yellow card) 23'; Hollý (yellow card) 80'	Stadium: Lokomotiv Stadium; Referee: Nikolai Ivanov

30 October 1999 29	CSKA Moscow	4 – 1	Dynamo Moscow	Moscow
17:00 MSK (UTC+3)	Șișchin 37' (yellow card) 51'; Bokov 39'; Yevsikov (yellow card) 41'; Golovskoy 44' (o.g.); Kulik 84'	Report	Teryokhin 1'; Radimov (yellow card) 23'; Gusev (yellow card) 31'; Plotnikov (yellow card) 69'	Stadium: Dynamo Stadium; Referee: A.Butenko

8 November 1999 30	Krylia Sovetov	1 – 1	CSKA Moscow	Samara
18:00 MSK (UTC+3)	Kaynov 47'	Report	Hollý 87'	Stadium: Metallurg Stadium; Referee: Yu.Makarov

==== Table ====
Pos	Team	Pld	W	D	L	GF	GA	GD	Pts	Qualification or relegation
1	Spartak Moscow (C)	30	22	6	2	75	24	+51	72	Qualification to Champions League group stage
2	Lokomotiv Moscow	30	20	5	5	62	30	+32	65	Qualification to Champions League third qualifying round
3	CSKA Moscow	30	15	10	5	56	29	+27	55	Qualification to UEFA Cup first round
4	Torpedo Moscow	30	13	11	6	38	33	+5	50	Qualification to UEFA Cup first round
5	Dynamo Moscow	30	12	8	10	44	41	+3	44	Qualification to UEFA Cup first round

Source: rsssf.com
Rules for classification: 1) points; 2) goal difference; 3) number of goals scored.
(C) Champions

=== Russian Cup ===
==== 1998–1999 ====
6 April 1999 Quarterfinal	CSKA Moscow	1 – 0	Shinnik Yaroslavl	Moscow
MSK (UTC+4)	Varlamov (yellow card) 10' (goal) 31'; Filippenkov (yellow card) 14'; Bokov (yellow card) 68'	Report	Snytko (yellow card) 4'; Bychkov (yellow card) 44'; Yenin (yellow card) 65'; Kazalov (yellow card) 72'; Rezantsev (yellow card) 74'	Stadium: Grigory Fedotov Stadium; Attendance: 3,500; Referee: Yuri Chebotaryov

21 April 1999 Semifinal	Zenit St.Petersburg	1 – 0	CSKA Moscow	Saint Petersburg
18:30 MSK (UTC+4)	Panov (yellow card) 8'; Hovsepyan (yellow card) 53'; Igonin (yellow card) 65'; Popovych 77'; Vernydub (yellow card) 80'	Report	Savelyev (yellow card) 15' (yellow-red card) 51'; Tsaplin (yellow card) 72'	Stadium: Petrovsky Stadium; Attendance: 22,000; Referee: Sergei Gusev

==== 1999–2000 ====
12 October 1999 Round of 32	Tom Tomsk	0 – 5	CSKA Moscow	Tomsk
16:00 MSK (UTC+4)	Konovalov (yellow card) 8'; Yanotovsky (yellow card) 59'; Lemeshko (yellow card) 70'	Report	Kulik 15', 48', 61'; Semak 56'; Hollý 70'	Stadium: Trud Stadium; Referee: G.Kulichenkov

13 November 1999 Last 16	CSKA Moscow	3 – 0	Spartak-Chukotka Moscow	Moscow
14:00 MSK (UTC+3)	Navochenko 56'; Filippenkov 80', 87'	Report	Fedin (yellow card) 63'; Shishlin (yellow card) 66'	Stadium: Grigory Fedotov Stadium; Referee: A.Kolobaev

The Quarterfinal took place during the 2000 season.

=== UEFA Champions League ===
==== Qualifying rounds ====
28 July 1999 Second qualifying round 1st leg	CSKA Moscow (Russia)	2 – 0	(Norway) Molde	Moscow, Russia
20:00 MSK (UTC+4)	Șișchin 7'; Khomukha 85'	Report	Strande (yellow card) 72'; Olsen (yellow card) 85'	Stadium: Dynamo Stadium; Attendance: 15,000; Referee: Manuel Mejuto González (Spain)

4 August 1999 Second qualifying round 2nd leg	Molde (Norway)	4 – 0 (4 – 2 agg.)	(Russia) CSKA Moscow	Molde, Norway
20:00 MSK (UTC+4)	Tessem 48'; Berg Hestad 65'; Hoseth 67', 81'	Report	Varlamov (yellow card) 20'; Hollý (yellow card) 37' (yellow-red card) 56'; Bokov (yellow card) 88'; Aksyonov (yellow card) 89'	Stadium: Aker Stadion; Attendance: 5,203; Referee: Gary Willard (England)

== Squad statistics ==
As of match played 13 November 1999

=== Appearances and goals ===
No.	Pos	Nat	Player	Total		Top Division		1997–98 Russian Cup		1998–99 Russian Cup		Champions League	
No.	Pos	Nat	Player	Apps	Goals	Apps	Goals	Apps	Goals	Apps	Goals	Apps	Goals
	GK	(Russia) RUS	Dmitri Goncharov	22	0	18	0	2	0	0	0	2	0
	GK	(Russia) RUS	Andrei Novosadov	14	0	12	0	0	0	2	0	0	0
	DF	(Russia) RUS	Maksim Bokov	34	1	28	1	2	0	2	0	2	0
	DF	(Russia) RUS	Aleksandr Borodkin	15	0	4+9	0	0+2	0	0	0	0	0
	DF	(Russia) RUS	Oleg Kornaukhov	32	0	26	0	2	0	2	0	2	0
	DF	(Russia) RUS	Valeri Minko	33	1	28	1	1	0	2	0	2	0
	DF	(Russia) RUS	Denis Pervushin	5	0	1+3	0	0+1	0	0	0	0	0
	DF	(Russia) RUS	Andrei Tsaplin	29	0	14+11	0	2	0	0+1	0	0+1	0
	DF	(Russia) RUS	Yevgeni Varlamov	25	6	21	5	2	1	0	0	2	0
	DF	(Russia) RUS	Denis Yevsikov	3	0	2+1	0	0	0	0	0	0	0
	MF	(Russia) RUS	Igor Aksyonov	18	0	9+7	0	1	0	0	0	1	0
	MF	(Moldova) MDA	Oleg Șișchin	19	4	13+2	3	0	0	2	0	2	1
	MF	(Russia) RUS	Sergei Filippenkov	35	8	23+6	6	1+1	0	2	2	1+1	0
	MF	(Russia) RUS	Aleksandr Grishin	12	0	8+4	0	0	0	0	0	0	0
	MF	(Russia) RUS	Artyom Kovalenko	1	0	0+1	0	0	0	0	0	0	0
	MF	(Russia) RUS	Aleksandr Lebedev	1	0	0+1	0	0	0	0	0	0	0
	MF	(Russia) RUS	Viktor Navochenko	16	1	6+7	0	1	0	2	1	0	0
	MF	(Russia) RUS	Sergei Rodin	2	0	1+1	0	0	0	0	0	0	0
	MF	(Russia) RUS	Aleksei Savelyev	27	2	10+14	2	1+1	0	0+1	0	0	0
	MF	(Russia) RUS	Sergei Semak	35	13	29	12	2	0	2	1	2	0
	MF	(Slovakia) SVK	Marek Hollý	18	2	13+1	1	0	0	2	1	2	0
	MF	(Turkmenistan) TKM	Dmitri Khomukha	36	9	28+2	8	2	0	2	0	2	1
	FW	(Russia) RUS	Magomed Adiyev	5	0	1+3	0	0+1	0	0	0	0	0
	FW	(Russia) RUS	Vladimir Kulik	36	18	28+2	15	2	0	2	3	2	0
	FW	(Russia) RUS	Aleksandr Suchkov	3	0	1+1	0	0	0	0+1	0	0	0
Players out on loan:
Players who left CSKA Moscow during the season:
	DF	(Croatia) CRO	Ante Pešić	4	0	2+2	0	0	0	0	0	0	0
	DF	(Estonia) EST	Andrei Krasnopjorov	1	0	1	0	0	0	0	0	0	0
	MF	(Kazakhstan) KAZ	Maksim Nizovtsev	3	0	1+1	0	1	0	0	0	0	0
	FW	(Federal Republic of Yugoslavia) YUG	Goran Gutalj	3	1	1+1	1	0	0	0	0	0+1	0

=== Goal scorers ===
Place	Position	Nation	Name	Top Division	1997–98 Russian Cup	1998–99 Russian Cup	Champions League	Total
1	FW	(Russia)	Vladimir Kulik	15	0	3	0	18
2	MF	(Russia)	Sergei Semak	12	0	1	0	13
3	MF	(Turkmenistan)	Dmitri Khomukha	8	0	0	1	9
4	MF	(Russia)	Sergei Filippenkov	6	0	2	0	8
5	DF	(Russia)	Yevgeni Varlamov	5	1	0	0	6
6	MF	(Moldova)	Oleg Șișchin	3	0	0	1	4
7	MF	(Russia)	Aleksei Savelyev	2	0	0	0	2
7	MF	(Slovakia)	Marek Hollý	1	0	1	0	2
9	DF	(Russia)	Maksim Bokov	1	0	0	0	1
9	DF	(Russia)	Valeri Minko	1	0	0	0	1
9	FW	(Federal Republic of Yugoslavia)	Goran Gutalj	1	0	0	0	1
9	MF	(Russia)	Viktor Navochenko	0	0	1	0	1
9			Own goal	1	0	0	0	1
			TOTALS	56	1	8	2	67

=== Disciplinary record ===
Nation	Position	Name	Top Division		1997–98 Russian Cup		1998–99 Russian Cup		Champions League		Total	
Nation	Position	Name	Booked	Sent off (straight red)	Booked	Sent off (straight red)	Booked	Sent off (straight red)	Booked	Sent off (straight red)	Booked	Sent off (straight red)
(Russia)	GK	Andrei Novosadov	1	0	0	0	0	0	0	0	1	0
(Russia)	DF	Maksim Bokov	5	0	1	0	0	0	1	0	7	0
(Russia)	DF	Aleksandr Borodkin	3	0	0	0	0	0	0	0	3	0
(Russia)	DF	Oleg Kornaukhov	5	0	0	0	0	0	0	0	5	0
(Russia)	DF	Valeri Minko	3	0	0	0	0	0	0	0	3	0
(Russia)	DF	Denis Pervushin	1	0	0	0	0	0	0	0	1	0
(Russia)	DF	Andrei Tsaplin	3	0	1	0	0	0	0	0	4	0
(Russia)	DF	Yevgeni Varlamov	2	0	1	0	0	0	1	0	4	0
(Russia)	DF	Denis Yevsikov	1	0	0	0	0	0	0	0	1	0
(Moldova)	MF	Oleg Șișchin	4	0	0	0	0	0	0	0	4	0
(Russia)	MF	Igor Aksyonov	3	0	0	0	0	0	1	0	4	0
(Russia)	MF	Sergei Filippenkov	4	0	1	0	0	0	0	0	5	0
(Russia)	MF	Aleksandr Grishin	4	0	0	0	0	0	0	0	1	0
(Russia)	MF	Viktor Navochenko	2	0	0	0	0	0	0	0	1	0
(Russia)	MF	Aleksei Savelyev	3	0	1	0	0	0	0	0	4	0
(Slovakia)	MF	Marek Hollý	1	0	0	0	0	0	2	1	3	1
(Turkmenistan)	MF	Dmitri Khomukha	2	0	0	0	0	0	0	0	1	0
Players out on loan :
Players who left CSKA Moscow during the season:
(Croatia)	DF	Ante Pešić	2	0	0	0	0	0	0	0	2	0
(Kazakhstan)	MF	Maksim Nizovtsev	1	0	0	0	0	0	0	0	1	0
		TOTALS	50	0	5	0	0	0	5	1	60	1
