= 1999 Russian Top Division =

8th season of top-tier football league in Russia

Russian Top Division
- Season: 1999

In this year, Spartak Moscow won their fourth consecutive Russian title, and seventh overall.

== Overview ==
Team	Head coach
FC Spartak Moscow	Oleg Romantsev
FC Lokomotiv Moscow	Yuri Syomin
PFC CSKA Moscow	Oleg Dolmatov
FC Torpedo Moscow	Vitaly Shevchenko
FC Dynamo Moscow	Georgi Yartsev (until June); Aleksei Petrushin (from June)
FC Alania Vladikavkaz	Valery Gazzaev
FC Rostselmash Rostov-on-Don	Sergey Andreyev
FC Zenit St. Petersburg	Anatoli Davydov
FC Uralan Elista	Pavlo Yakovenko (Ukraine) (until May); Aleksandr Skrynnikov (caretaker) (May to June); Yevhen Kucherevskyi (Ukraine) (June); Aleksandr Skrynnikov (caretaker) (June); Aleksandr Averyanov (from June)
FC Saturn Ramenskoye	Sergei Pavlov
FC Lokomotiv Nizhny Novgorod	Valeri Ovchinnikov
FC Krylia Sovetov Samara	Aleksandr Tarkhanov
FC Rotor Volgograd	Viktor Prokopenko (Ukraine)
FC Chernomorets Novorossiysk	Sergei Butenko (until July); Vladimir Fedotov (from July)
FC Zhemchuzhina Sochi	Anatoly Baidachny (until May); Gennadi Afanasyev (caretaker) (May to June); Viktor Antikhovich (from June)
FC Shinnik Yaroslavl	Aleksandr Averyanov (until April); Aleksandr Pobegalov (caretaker) (April to June); Benjaminas Zelkevičius (Lithuania) (June to October); Aleksandr Pobegalov (caretaker) (from October)

== Standings ==
Pos	Team	Pld	W	D	L	GF	GA	GD	Pts	Qualification or relegation
1	Spartak Moscow (C)	30	22	6	2	75	24	+51	72	Qualification to Champions League group stage
2	Lokomotiv Moscow	30	20	5	5	62	30	+32	65	Qualification to Champions League third qualifying round
3	CSKA Moscow	30	15	10	5	56	29	+27	55	Qualification to UEFA Cup first round
4	Torpedo Moscow	30	13	11	6	38	33	+5	50	Qualification to UEFA Cup first round
5	Dynamo Moscow	30	12	8	10	44	41	+3	44	Qualification to UEFA Cup first round
6	Alania Vladikavkaz (Note: Alania qualified for the UEFA Cup thanks to Lokomotiv winning the Russian Cup in 2000.)	30	12	7	11	54	45	+9	43	Qualification to UEFA Cup first round
7	Rostselmash	30	11	8	11	32	37	−5	41	Qualification to Intertoto Cup third round
8	Zenit St. Petersburg	30	9	12	9	36	34	+2	39	Qualification to Intertoto Cup second round
9	Uralan Elista	30	10	6	14	27	34	−7	36	
10	Saturn	30	8	10	12	30	38	−8	34	
11	Lokomotiv N.N.	30	9	6	15	33	48	−15	33	
12	Krylia Sovetov Samara	30	8	7	15	39	49	−10	31	
13	Rotor Volgograd	30	7	10	13	36	51	−15	31	
14	Chernomorets Novorossiysk	30	7	8	15	30	49	−19	29	
15	Zhemchuzhina Sochi (R)	30	5	11	14	29	55	−26	26	Relegation to First Division
16	Shinnik Yaroslavl (R)	30	5	9	16	21	45	−24	24	Relegation to First Division

Source: rsssf.com
Rules for classification: 1) points; 2) goal difference; 3) number of goals scored.
(C) Champions; (R) Relegated

== Results ==
Home \ Away	ALA	CHE	CSK	DYN	KRY	LOK	LNN	ROS	ROT	SAT	SHI	SPA	TOR	URE	ZEN	ZHE
Alania Vladikavkaz		3–1	0–1	5–1	1–1	0–2	5–2	3–1	3–0 (Note: In the match of the 17th round between Alania and Rotor, the Volgograd team left the field in the 66th minute with the score 1:1 as a sign of disagreement with the referee's decision. "Rotor" was awarded a technical loss of 3:0.)	2–0	3–1	0–1	6–1	4–2	2–2	2–2
Chernomorets Novorossiysk	1–0		2–1	2–1	1–1	1–4	0–1	1–0	1–1	1–1	1–1	1–1	1–2	0–0	1–0	3–0
CSKA Moscow	4–1	5–2		4–1	1–1	1–0	3–1	2–0	5–1	1–0	5–0	0–4	0–0	2–0	2–2	3–0
Dynamo Moscow	0–0	0–1	1–0		3–3	2–4	2–1	4–0	2–1	0–0	3–1	1–1	1–1	1–0	0–1	3–0
Krylia Sovetov Samara	0–3	1–1	1–1	1–2		1–2	3–0	0–0	0–1	2–0	4–2	3–1	1–2	0–1	3–2	4–2
Lokomotiv Moscow	4–1	2–1	1–0	2–1	2–0		3–1	3–0	5–1	3–0	4–1	0–3	1–2	1–0	1–1	1–1
Lokomotiv N.N.	2–1	3–2	0–2	1–3	3–0	0–0		0–0	1–1	0–1	1–0	2–4	0–1	1–2	1–0	2–1
Rostselmash	4–2	1–0	1–3	1–3	2–1	1–1	1–0		1–1	4–1	0–0	0–3	0–0	2–0	2–1	2–1
Rotor Volgograd	0–2	5–2	1–1	1–2	2–1	1–0	2–3	0–1		1–1	2–0	3–3	0–2	3–1	2–2	0–0
Saturn	0–1	3–0	2–3	3–3	2–0	1–1	1–1	1–1	1–0		0–0	0–3	2–2	2–0	1–0	3–0
Shinnik Yaroslavl	1–1	1–0	0–0	3–1	1–2	2–4	0–1	0–3	2–0	0–0		1–2	1–0	1–0	0–0	0–0
Spartak Moscow	3–0	2–0	1–0	2–2	3–0	3–0	2–2	1–0	4–1	3–1	4–1		0–1	3–0	4–1	4–0
Torpedo Moscow	1–1	3–1	2–2	0–1	3–1	2–4	3–2	1–2	2–1	0–2	0–0	0–0		3–1	1–0	1–0
Uralan Elista	3–0	3–1	1–1	1–0	2–1	0–1	3–0	2–1	0–1	2–0	1–0	0–1	1–1		0–0	1–1
Zenit St. Petersburg	2–2	1–1	1–1	0–0	3–1	1–2	1–0	1–0	1–1	2–1	2–1	1–2	0–0	2–0		3–1
Zhemchuzhina Sochi	2–0	2–0	2–2	1–0	0–2	1–4	1–1	1–1	2–2	2–0	1–0	3–7	1–1	0–0	1–3	

Legend: Blue = home team win; Yellow = draw; Red = away team win.

== Season statistics ==
=== Top goalscorers ===
As of matches played on 8 November 1999.

Rank	Player	Club	Goals
1	(Georgia (country)) Georgi Demetradze	Alania	21
2	(Russia) Andrey Tikhonov	Spartak Moscow	19
3	(Russia) Vladimir Kulik	CSKA	15
4	(Russia) Dmitri Loskov	Lokomotiv Moscow	14
4	(Russia) Oleg Teryokhin	Dynamo	14
6	(Tajikistan) Arsen Avakov	Lokomotiv N.N.	13
7	(Russia) Vyacheslav Kamoltsev	Torpedo	12
7	(Russia) Sergei Semak	CSKA	12
7	(Russia) Oleg Veretennikov	Rotor	12
10	(Russia) Egor Titov	Spartak Moscow	11

== Awards ==
On December 2 Russian Football Union named its list of 33 top players:

Goalkeepers

1. (Russia) Aleksandr Filimonov (Spartak Moscow)
2. (Russia) Ruslan Nigmatullin (Lokomotiv Moscow)
3. (Armenia) Roman Berezovsky (Zenit)

Right backs

1. (Ukraine) Dmytro Parfenov (Spartak Moscow)
2. (Russia) Valeri Minko (CSKA Moscow)
3. (Russia) Aleksei Arifullin (Lokomotiv Moscow)

Right-centre backs

1. (Russia) Dmitri Khlestov (Spartak Moscow)
2. (Tajikistan) Igor Cherevchenko (Lokomotiv Moscow)
3. (Russia) Vyacheslav Dayev (Torpedo Moscow)

Left-centre backs

1. (Russia) Igor Chugainov (Lokomotiv Moscow)
2. (Russia) Viktor Bulatov (Spartak Moscow)
3. (Russia) Yevgeni Varlamov (CSKA Moscow)

Left backs

1. (Belarus) Sergei Gurenko (Lokomotiv Moscow)
2. (Russia) Yuri Kovtun (Spartak Moscow)
3. (Russia) Oleg Kornaukhov (CSKA Moscow)

Right wingers

1. (Russia) Sergei Semak (CSKA Moscow)
2. (Armenia) Albert Sarkisyan (Lokomotiv Moscow)
3. (Ukraine) Olexandr Gorshkov (Zenit)

Right-center midfielders

1. (Russia) Alexey Smertin (Lokomotiv Moscow)
2. (Russia) Yuri Drozdov (Lokomotiv Moscow)
3. (Turkmenistan) Dmitri Khomukha (CSKA Moscow)

Left-center midfielders

1. (Russia) Yegor Titov (Spartak Moscow)
2. (Russia) Dmitri Loskov (Lokomotiv Moscow)
3. (Russia) Artyom Bezrodny (Spartak Moscow)

Left wingers

1. (Russia) Andrey Tikhonov (Spartak Moscow)
2. (Russia) Rolan Gusev (Dynamo Moscow)
3. (Russia) Yevgeni Kharlachyov (Lokomotiv Moscow)

Right forwards

1. (Russia) Aleksandr Panov (Zenit)
2. (Georgia (country)) Zaza Janashia (Lokomotiv Moscow)
3. (Russia) Aleksandr Shirko (Spartak Moscow)

Left forwards

1. (Georgia (country)) Giorgi Demetradze (Alania)
2. (Russia) Vladimir Kulik (CSKA Moscow)
3. (Russia) Oleg Teryokhin (Dynamo Moscow)

== Medal squads ==
1. FC Spartak Moscow

Goalkeepers: Aleksandr Filimonov (28), Andrei Smetanin (5).
Defenders: Dmitri Khlestov (27 / 1), Yuri Kovtun (26 / 2), Eduard Mor (23), Dmytro Parfenov (Ukraine) (17), Vadim Evseev (11 / 1), Yevgeni Bushmanov (9), Dmitri Ananko (7).
Midfielders: Andrey Tikhonov (29 / 19), Yegor Titov (29 / 11), Valery Kechinov (26 / 4), Viktor Bulatov (29 / 4), Vasili Baranov (Belarus) (24 / 4), Artyom Bezrodny (19 / 5), Ilya Tsymbalar (11 / 2), Aleksei Zlydnev (2), Aleksei Melyoshin (2), Peniche (Brazil) (2).
Forwards: Aleksandr Shirko (27 / 9), Luis Robson (Brazil) (20 / 7), Sergei Yuran (18 / 3), Maksim Buznikin (6 / 1), Anatoli Kanishchev (1).
(league appearances and goals listed in brackets)

One own goal each scored by Aleksandr Berketov (FC Rotor Volgograd) and Igor Cherevchenko (Tajikistan) (FC Lokomotiv Moscow).

Manager: Oleg Romantsev.

Transferred out during the season: Sergei Yuran (to (Austria) SK Sturm Graz), Ilya Tsymbalar (to FC Lokomotiv Moscow), Maksim Buznikin (to FC Saturn Ramenskoye).

2. FC Lokomotiv Moscow

Goalkeepers: Ruslan Nigmatullin (29), Aleksey Polyakov (Uzbekistan) (1).
Defenders: Igor Chugainov (29 / 4), Andrei Lavrik (Belarus) (26), Oleg Pashinin (Uzbekistan) (25 / 1), Yuri Drozdov (21), Igor Cherevchenko (Tajikistan) (20 / 2), Sargis Hovhannisyan (Armenia) (16 / 2), Aleksei Arifullin (16), Andrei Solomatin (13), Sergei Gurenko (Belarus) (6 / 2), Semyon Semenenko (6).
Midfielders: Alexey Smertin (29 / 6), Dmitri Loskov (28 / 14), Yevgeni Kharlachyov (27 / 9), Albert Sarkisyan (Armenia) (26 / 4), Vladimir Maminov (Uzbekistan) (22 / 3), Sergei Neretin (3), Aleksandr Borodyuk (1).
Forwards: Dmitri Bulykin (26 / 8), Zaza Janashia (Georgia (country)) (20 / 6), Ruslan Pimenov (4 / 1), Mikalay Ryndzyuk (Belarus) (4).

Manager: Yuri Syomin.

Transferred out during the season: Sergei Gurenko (Belarus) (to (Italy) A.S. Roma), Mikalay Ryndzyuk (Belarus) (to (Belarus) FC BATE Borisov), Aleksandr Borodyuk (to FC Torpedo-ZIL Moscow).

3. PFC CSKA Moscow

Goalkeepers: Dmitri Goncharov (18), Andrei Novosadov (12).
Defenders: Maksim Bokov (28 / 1), Valeri Minko (28 / 1), Oleg Kornaukhov (26), Yevgeni Varlamov (21 / 5), Igor Aksyonov (16), Denis Pervushin (4), Ante Pešić (Croatia) (4), Denis Yevsikov (3).
Midfielders: Dmitri Khomukha (Turkmenistan) (30 / 8), Sergei Semak (29 / 12), Sergei Filippenkov (29 / 6), Andrei Tsaplin (25), Aleksei Savelyev (24 / 2), Oleg Shishkin (Moldova) (15 / 3), Marek Hollý (Slovakia) (14 / 1), Aleksandr Borodkin (13), Viktor Navochenko (13), Aleksandr Grishin (12), Magomed Adiev (4), Maksim Nizovtsev (Kazakhstan) (2), Artyom Kovalenko (1), Andrei Krasnopjorov (Estonia) (1), Aleksandr Lebedev (1).
Forwards: Vladimir Kulik (30 / 14), Goran Gutalj (Serbia) (2 / 1), Sergei Rodin (2), Aleksandr Suchkov (2).

One own goal each scored by Konstantin Golovskoy (FC Dynamo Moscow) and Dmitriy Lyapkin (Kazakhstan) (FC Saturn Ramenskoye).

Manager: Oleg Dolmatov.

Transferred out during the season: Aleksandr Borodkin (to FC Torpedo-ZIL Moscow), Magomed Adiev (to FC Sokol Saratov), Ante Pešić (Croatia) (to (Croatia) NK Vukovar '91), Maksim Nizovtsev (Kazakhstan) (to FC Baltika Kaliningrad), Goran Gutalj (Serbia) (to (Slovenia) HIT Gorica), Andrei Krasnopjorov (Estonia) (to (Estonia) FC Lantana Tallinn).

== Attendances ==
#	Club	Average
1	Alania	21,400
2	Zenit	18,800
3	Spartak Moscow	18,000
4	Krylia Sovetov	14,367
5	Nizhny Novgorod	12,383
6	Rotor	11,700
7	Saturn	9,833
8	Chernomorets	9,633
9	Rostselmash	9,120
10	PFC CSKA	8,613
11	Shinnik	8,600
12	Dynamo Moscow	8,367
13	Torpedo	6,247
14	Zhemchuzhina	5,867
15	Elista	5,660
16	Lokomotiv Moscow	5,593

== See also ==
- 1999 in Russian football
