= Sergey Lapochkin =

Sergey Lapochkin may refer to:

- Sergey Lapochkin (referee, born 1958), retired Russian football referee
- Sergey Lapochkin (referee, born 1981), Russian football referee
