= Artur Rozyyev =

Russian footballer (born 1982)

Personal information
- Full name: Artur Geldymuratovich Rozyyev
- Date of birth: 25 October 1982 (age 43)
- Place of birth: Tashkent, Uzbek SSR, Soviet Union
- Height: 1.72 m (5 ft 8 in)
- Positions: Midfielder; forward

Youth career
- PFC CSKA Moscow

Senior career*
Years	Team	Apps	(Gls)
2000–2002	FC Fabus Bronnitsy	80	(9)
2003–2005	FC Dynamo Bryansk	100	(5)
2006	FC Ural Yekaterinburg	22	(0)
2007	FC Nara-Desna Naro-Fominsk	12	(0)
2007–2008	FC SKA-Energiya Khabarovsk	22	(3)
2008	FC Chernomorets Novorossiysk	9	(0)
2009	FC Dmitrov	15	(2)
2010	FC Avangard Podolsk	7	(1)
- * Club domestic league appearances and goals

Artur Geldymuratovich Rozyyev (Russian: Артур Гельдымуратович Розыев; born 25 October 1982) is a former Russian professional football player.

== Club career ==
He played 5 seasons in the Russian Football National League for 4 different clubs.
