= Rezantsev =

Rezantsev may refer to:

- Andrey Rezantsev (born 1965), Uzbekistani footballer
- Valery Rezantsev (born 1946), Russian Greco-Roman wrestler
- Yakov Rezantsev (1973–2022), Russian general
