= Dmitrov (disambiguation) =

Dmitrov is a town in Dmitrovsky District of Moscow Oblast, Russia.

Dmitrov may also refer to:

- Dmitrov Urban Settlement, a municipal formation which the Town of Dmitrov in Dmitrovsky District of Moscow Oblast, Russia is incorporated as
- FC Dmitrov, an association football club based in Dmitrov, Russia
- HC Dmitrov, an ice hockey team based in Dmitrov, Russia
