= Sergei Kopnin =

Russian footballer

Personal information
- Full name: Sergei Vladimirovich Kopnin
- Date of birth: 1 September 1976 (age 50)
- Place of birth: Rybinsk, Russian SFSR
- Height: 1.97 m (6 ft 5 1/2 in)
- Position: Defender

Senior career*
Years	Team	Apps	(Gls)
1994	FC Vympel Rybinsk	8	(0)
1995	FC Tekstilshchik Kamyshin	0	(0)
1995–1996	FC Metallurg Lipetsk	21	(2)
1996	FC Dynamo Vologda	8	(0)
1997	FC Energiya Kamyshin	40	(2)
1998–1999	FC Rotor Volgograd	18	(0)
1998–1999	FC Rotor-2 Volgograd	29	(2)
2000	FC Shinnik Yaroslavl	12	(0)
2001	FC Sibur-Khimik Dzerzhinsk	10	(0)
2002	FC Chkalovets-1936 Novosibirsk	17	(3)
2003	FC Luch-Energiya Vladivostok	19	(0)
2004	FC Nosta Novotroitsk	9	(0)
2005–2006	FC Energetik Uren	26	(1)
2007	FC Znamya Truda Orekhovo-Zuyevo	14	(0)
2007	FC Dynamo Kirov	10	(0)
2008	FSC Rybinsk (D4)		
2009	FC Sakhalin Yuzhno-Sakhalinsk	5	(1)
- * Club domestic league appearances and goals

Sergei Vladimirovich Kopnin (Russian: Серге́й Владимирович Копнин; born 1 September 1976) is a former Russian professional football player.
