= Valeriy Yablochkin =

Kazakhstani footballer

Personal information
- Full name: Valeriy Nikolayevich Yablochkin
- Date of birth: 2 February 1973 (age 53)
- Place of birth: Temirtau, Kazakh SSR
- Height: 1.78 m (5 ft 10 in)
- Position: Forward

Youth career
- 1981–1985: DYuSSh Temirtau
- 1985–1988: KhGVUFK-1 Kharkov
- 1988–1989: Kazakh Republican Sportinternat Alma-Ata

Senior career*
Years	Team	Apps	(Gls)
1989	RShVSM Alma-Ata	1	(0)
1990	FC Bolat	23	(4)
1991	FC Vostok	1	(0)
1991	FC Shakhter Karagandy	25	(7)
1992	FC Kairat	17	(3)
1993–1996	FC Shinnik Yaroslavl	135	(58)
1997	FC Lokomotiv Moscow	10	(1)
1997	→ FC Lokomotiv-d Moscow (loan)	5	(2)
1998	FC Neftyanik Yaroslavl	10	(0)
Total		227	(75)

International career
1992–1997	Kazakhstan	2	(1)
- * Club domestic league appearances and goals

Valeriy Nikolayevich Yablochkin (Russian: Валерий Николаевич Яблочкин; born 2 February 1973 in Temirtau) is a retired football forward from Kazakhstan. He obtained a total number of two caps for the Kazakhstan national football team during his career, scoring one goal.
