= Igor Gavrilin (footballer) =

Russian footballer

Personal information
- Full name: Igor Aleksandrovich Gavrilin
- Date of birth: 10 November 1972 (age 53)
- Place of birth: Zhukovsky, Moscow Oblast
- Height: 1.82 m (5 ft 11 1/2 in)
- Positions: Forward; midfielder

Team information
- Current team: FC Saturn Ramenskoye (asst manager)

Youth career
- FC Meteor Zhukovsky

Senior career*
| Years | Team | Apps | (Gls) |
| 1990 | FC Znamya Truda Orekhovo-Zuyevo | 4 | (0) |
| 1991 | FC Moskovsky (amateur) | | |
| 1992–1993 | FC Dynamo Moscow | 8 | (1) |
| 1992–1993 | → FC Dynamo-d Moscow (loans) | 57 | (13) |
| 1994 | FC Tekhinvest-M Moskovsky | 23 | (2) |
| 1994–1995 | Hapoel Bat Yam F.C. | | |
| 1995 | FC Stroitel Kurovskoye | | |
| 1996 | FC Meteor Zhukovsky (amateur) | | |
| 1997 | FC Titan Reutov | 20 | (8) |
| 1997–2000 | FC Saturn Ramenskoye | 95 | (32) |
| 2000 | → FC Saturn-d Ramenskoye (loan) | 5 | (3) |
| 2000–2001 | FC Shinnik Yaroslavl | 48 | (16) |
| 2002 | FC Shatura | | |
| 2003 | FC Salyut-Energia Belgorod | 36 | (17) |
| 2004 | FC Khimki | 26 | (3) |
| 2005–2006 | FC Ryazan-Agrokomplekt Ryazan | 50 | (24) |
| 2006 | FC Spartak Lukhovitsy | 11 | (2) |
| 2007–2008 | FC Kolomna (amateur) | | |
| 2009 | FC Krasnogvardeyets Moscow (amateur) | | |
| 2010–2012 | FC Kolomna (amateur) | | |
| 2012–2013 | FC Saturn Ramenskoye (amateur) | | |
| 2014–2015 | FC Saturn-2 Ramenskoye (amateur) | | |
| 2015 | FC Olimpik Mytishchi | | |

Managerial career
- 2016–: FC Saturn Ramenskoye (assistant)
- * Club domestic league appearances and goals

Igor Aleksandrovich Gavrilin (Russian: Игорь Александрович Гаврилин; born 10 November 1972) is a Russian professional football coach and a former player. He is an assistant manager for FC Saturn Ramenskoye.

== Honours ==
- Russian Premier League bronze: 1992, 1993.
- Russian Cup finalist: 2005 (played in the early stages of the 2004/05 tournament for FC Khimki).
