= Dmitri Alekseyev =

Russian footballer (1973–2025)

Personal information
- Full name: Dmitri Vadimovich Alekseyev
- Date of birth: 28 February 1973
- Place of birth: Leningrad, Russian SFSR, USSR
- Date of death: 19 July 2025 (aged 52)
- Height: 1.88 m (6 ft 2 in)
- Position: Goalkeeper

Senior career*
Years	Team	Apps	(Gls)
1990–1992	FC Prometei-Dynamo St. Petersburg	82	(0)
1993	FC Zhemchuzhina Sochi	1	(0)
1993	FC Torpedo Adler	2	(0)
1994	FC Khimik Belorechensk	5	(0)
1994	FC Lokomotiv Nizhny Novgorod	1	(0)
1995–1996	FC Torpedo Arzamas	62	(0)
1997–1999	FC Uralan Elista	45	(0)
2000	FC Shinnik Yaroslavl	24	(0)
2001	FC Rubin Kazan	9	(0)
2002	FC Krasnoznamensk	26	(0)
2003	FC Luch-Energiya Vladivostok	3	(0)
2004–2005	FC Dynamo Bryansk	39	(0)
2006	FC Zvezda Serpukhov	15	(0)
2006	FC SKA-Energiya Khabarovsk	5	(0)
2007	FC Dynamo Bryansk	28	(0)
2008–2009	FC Metallurg Lipetsk	40	(0)
2010	FC Dynamo Bryansk	0	(0)
- * Club domestic league appearances and goals

Dmitri Vadimovich Alekseyev (Russian: Дмитрий Вадимович Алексеев; 28 February 1973 – 19 July 2025) was a Russian professional footballer who played as a goalkeeper. Alekseyev died on 19 July 2025, at the age of 52.

== Career ==
Alekseyev made his debut in the Russian Premier League in 1993 for FC Zhemchuzhina Sochi.
