= Vadim Pomazov =

Russian footballer

Personal information
- Full name: Vadim Gennadyevich Pomazov
- Date of birth: 5 July 1968 (age 58)
- Place of birth: Yaroslavl, Russian SFSR
- Height: 1.74 m (5 ft 8 1/2 in)
- Position: Midfielder

Youth career
- Yaroslavets Yaroslavl

Senior career*
Years	Team	Apps	(Gls)
1986	FC Spartak Kostroma	28	(10)
1987–1988	FC Dynamo-2 Moscow	45	(6)
1989–1996	FC Shinnik Yaroslavl	228	(20)
1997–1999	FC Samotlor-XXI Nizhnevartovsk	85	(15)
2000	FC Sibiryak Bratsk	8	(0)
2002	FC Impuls Yaroslavl		
- * Club domestic league appearances and goals

Vadim Gennadyevich Pomazov (Russian: Вадим Геннадьевич Помазов; born 5 July 1968) is a former Russian football player.
