= Sergei Neretin =

Russian footballer

Personal information
- Full name: Sergei Vladimirovich Neretin
- Date of birth: 16 January 1980 (age 46)
- Height: 1.84 m (6 ft 1/2 in)
- Positions: Midfielder; defender

Senior career*
Years	Team	Apps	(Gls)
1997–2000	FC Lokomotiv-2 Moscow	139	(6)
1999	FC Lokomotiv Moscow	3	(0)
2001	FC Lokomotiv Moscow (reserves)	8	(0)
2001	FC Zhenis	12	(2)
2004–2005	FC Sportakademklub Moscow	46	(9)
2005	FC Chkalovets-1936 Novosibirsk	13	(0)
2006–2007	FC Mashuk-KMV Pyatigorsk	47	(6)
2007–2008	FC Dynamo Bryansk	28	(0)
2008	FC Dynamo St. Petersburg	12	(2)
- * Club domestic league appearances and goals

Sergei Vladimirovich Neretin (Russian: Серге́й Владимирович Неретин; born 16 January 1980) is a Russian former professional footballer.

== Honours ==
- Russian Premier League runner-up: 1999.
- Kazakhstan Premier League champion: 2001.
