= Grigory Fedotov Stadium =

Sports venue in Moscow, Russia

Coordinates: 55°47′29″N 37°30′58″E

- Interactive map of Grigory Fedotov Stadium
- Full name: Grigory Fedotov Stadium
- Location: Moscow, Russia
- Capacity: -10,000

Construction
- Opened: 1961
- Closed: 2000
- Demolished: 2007
- Project manager: Andrei Grechko

Tenant
- PFC CSKA Moscow (1974-2000)

Grigory Fedotov Stadium was a multi-use stadium in Moscow, Russia. It was initially used as the stadium of PFC CSKA Moscow matches. The capacity of the stadium was 10,000 spectators. It was named after for former CSKA striker, Grigory Fedotov.

It was located between Peschanye ulitsy (Sand streets) district and Khodynka Field at the Park of Birch Grove. Due to its location, it also was called as Peschanoye CSKA Stadium.

It has been replaced with VEB Arena.
