= Igor Aksyonov =

Russian footballer

Personal information
- Full name: Igor Vladimirovich Aksyonov
- Date of birth: 11 August 1977 (age 49)
- Place of birth: Kalinin, Russian SFSR
- Height: 1.79 m (5 ft 10 1/2 in)
- Position: Midfielder

Team information
- Current team: PFC CSKA Moscow (conditioning coach)

Senior career*
Years	Team	Apps	(Gls)
1994–1995	FC Trion-Volga Tver	48	(5)
1996–1998	FC Arsenal Tula	82	(7)
1999	PFC CSKA Moscow	16	(0)
2000	FC Lokomotiv Nizhny Novgorod	10	(0)
2000	FK Rīga	13	(5)
2001	PFC CSKA Moscow	0	(0)
2002	FC Anzhi Makhachkala	14	(1)
2003	FC Kristall Smolensk	20	(1)
2003–2004	FC Kuban Krasnodar	33	(0)
2005	FC Metalist Kharkiv		
2006	FC Nara-Desna Naro-Fominsk	13	(0)
2006–2007	FC Aktobe	13	(0)
2007–2008	Astana	21	(0)
2008	FC Volga Tver	31	(0)
2009	FC Dmitrov	31	(2)
2010	FC Volga Tver	20	(0)

International career
1998–1999	Russia U21	11	(0)

Managerial career
- 2016–: PFC CSKA Moscow (conditioning coach)
- * Club domestic league appearances and goals

Igor Vladimirovich Aksyonov (Russian: Игорь Владимирович Аксёнов; born 11 August 1977) is a Russian professional football coach and a former player. He currently works as a conditioning coach with PFC CSKA Moscow.

== Club career ==
He made his debut in the Russian Premier League in 1999 for PFC CSKA Moscow. He played one game in the UEFA Champions League 1999–2000 qualification for PFC CSKA Moscow.

== Honours ==
- Russian Premier League bronze: 1999.
