= Serhiy Snytko =

Ukrainian-Russian footballer

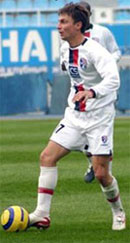

Personal information
- Full name: Serhiy Nykolayevych Snytko
- Date of birth: 31 March 1975 (age 51)
- Place of birth: Kerch, Soviet Union
- Height: 1.84 m (6 ft 1/2 in)
- Position: Midfielder

Senior career*
Years	Team	Apps	(Gls)
1992–1994	Voykovets Kerch	51	(5)
1994–1997	Yavir Krasnopilya	78	(6)
1997–1999	Shinnik Yaroslavl	58	(5)
2000–2003	Chernomorets Novorossiysk	81	(7)
2003–2004	Kuban Krasnodar	30	(2)
2006–2007	Tavriya Simferopol	36	(0)
2007–2008	Naftovyk-Ukrnafta	21	(0)
2009–2010	Volyn Lutsk	11	(1)
2011–2013	Sumy	45	(3)

International career
2001	Ukraine	2	(0)
- * Club domestic league appearances and goals as of 7 March 2018

Serhiy Mykolayovych Snytko (born 31 March 1975, Kerch, Autonomous Republic of Crimea, Ukrainian SSR, Soviet Union) is a retired Ukrainian football midfielder, who also holds Russian citizenship.
