= Andrei Tsaplin =

Russian footballer

Personal information
- Full name: Andrei Yuryevich Tsaplin
- Date of birth: 22 January 1977 (age 49)
- Place of birth: Perm, Russian SFSR
- Height: 1.86 m (6 ft 1 in)
- Position: Defender

Youth career
- SDYuSShOR Perm

Senior career*
Years	Team	Apps	(Gls)
1993–2003	CSKA Moscow	58	(1)
1993–2003	→ CSKA-2 Moscow	118	(17)
1996	→ Arsenal Tula (loan)	10	(0)
1997	→ Sokol-PZhD Saratov (loan)	10	(0)
2002	→ Torpedo-ZIL Moscow (loan)	12	(0)
2003	→ Sokol Saratov (loan)	29	(1)
2004–2005	Sokol Saratov	64	(3)
2006	Salyut-Energia Belgorod	34	(2)
2008	SKA-Energia Khabarovsk	1	(0)
2009	Dmitrov	16	(1)
2010	Volga Tver	2	(1)
2010	Neman Grodno	4	(0)

International career
1994	Russia U19	3	(0)
1998–1999	Russia U21	7	(2)
- * Club domestic league appearances and goals

Andrei Yuryevich Tsaplin (Russian: Андрей Юрьевич Цаплин; born 22 January 1977) is a Russian former professional footballer.

== Club career ==
He made his debut in the Russian Premier League in 1996 for PFC CSKA Moscow.

== Honours ==
- Russian Premier League runner-up: 1998.
- Russian Premier League bronze: 1999.
- Russian Cup winner: 2002.
- Russian Cup finalist: 2000.
