= Oleg Kornaukhov =

Russian footballer and official

Personal information
- Full name: Oleg Dmitriyevich Kornaukhov
- Date of birth: 14 January 1975 (age 51)
- Place of birth: Moscow, Russian SFSR
- Height: 1.82 m (6 ft 0 in)
- Position: Defender

Team information
- Current team: CSKA Moscow (academy director)

Youth career
- 1991: FShM Moscow

Senior career*
Years	Team	Apps	(Gls)
1992–1997	Torpedo Moscow	77	(2)
1997	Shinnik Yaroslavl	13	(1)
1998–2001	CSKA Moscow	104	(7)
2002–2003	Torpedo-Metallurg Moscow	16	(4)
2003	CSKA Moscow	0	(0)
2004	Kuban Krasnodar	25	(0)
2005	Shinnik Yaroslavl	12	(0)
2006	Terek Grozny	20	(0)
2007	Torpedo Moscow	16	(0)
2008	Sportakademklub Moscow	19	(0)
2009	Dmitrov	28	(3)
Total		330	(17)

International career
1994–1998	Russia U-21	8	(0)
1998	Russia	1	(1)

Managerial career
- 2018–: CSKA Moscow (academy director)
- * Club domestic league appearances and goals

Oleg Dmitriyevich Kornaukhov (Russian: Олег Дмитриевич Корнаухов; born 14 January 1975) is a Russian football official and a former player. He is the director of PFC CSKA Moscow academy.

== Honours ==
- Russian Premier League runner-up: 1998.
- Russian Premier League bronze: 1999.
- Russian Cup winner:1993, 2002.
- Russian Cup runner-up: 2000.
- Top 33 players year-end list: 1998, 1999.

== International career ==
Kornaukhov played his only game for Russia so far on 18 November 1998 in a friendly against Brazil. Russia lost 1–5 and Kornaukhov scored the only goal from a penalty kick.

=== International goal ===
Scores and results list Russia's goal tally first.

No	Date	Venue	Opponent	Score	Result	Competition
1.	18 November 1998	Estádio Governador Plácido Castelo, Fortaleza, Ceará, Brazil	Brazil	1–4	1–5	Friendly match

== Post-playing career ==
On 18 December 2018, he was appointed the director of academy for PFC CSKA Moscow.
