= Aleksandr Skrynnikov =

Russian footballer and coach

Personal information
- Full name: Aleksandr Viktorovich Skrynnikov
- Date of birth: January 19, 1960 (age 66)
- Position: Defender

Senior career*
Years	Team	Apps	(Gls)
1981–1982	FC Uralan Elista	60	(1)
1984–1985	FC Uralan Elista	58	(3)
1988–1990	FC Uralan Elista	100	(2)
1992	FC Rotor-d Volgograd	1	(0)

Managerial career
- 1991–1996: FC Uralan Elista (assistant)
- 1994: FC Uralan-d Elista
- 1999–2000: FC Uralan Elista (assistant)
- 1999: FC Uralan Elista (caretaker)
- 2005–2006: FC Elista
- 2008: FC Volgar-Gazprom-2 Astrakhan
- * Club domestic league appearances and goals

Aleksandr Viktorovich Skrynnikov (Russian: Александр Викторович Скрынников; born January 19, 1960) is a Russian professional football coach and a former player.
