= Yuri Borovskoy =

Russian footballer and referee

Personal information
- Full name: Yuri Viktorovich Borovskoy
- Date of birth: 11 June 1971 (age 55)
- Place of birth: Rostov-on-Don, Russian SFSR
- Height: 1.92 m (6 ft 3 1/2 in)
- Position: Defender

Senior career*
| Years | Team | Apps | (Gls) |
| 1989–1991 | FC SKA Rostov-on-Don | 64 | (1) |
| 1991–1996 | FC Rostselmash Rostov-on-Don | 85 | (1) |
| 1996–1997 | FC Tyumen | 27 | (1) |
| 1997 | FC Kolos Pokrovskoye | | |
| 1998 | FC Kuban Krasnodar | 17 | (1) |
| 1999–2001 | FC Rostselmash Rostov-on-Don | 30 | (2) |
| 2002 | FC SKA Rostov-on-Don | 5 | (0) |
- * Club domestic league appearances and goals

Yuri Viktorovich Borovskoy (Russian: Юрий Викторович Боровской; born 11 June 1971) is a former Russian professional football referee and a player.

== Club career ==
As a player, he made his professional debut in the Soviet First League in 1989 for FC SKA Rostov-on-Don.

== Referee career ==
He refereed third-tier PFL from 2003 to 2010.

== European club competitions ==
With FC Rostselmash Rostov-on-Don.

- UEFA Intertoto Cup 1999: 2 games.
- UEFA Intertoto Cup 2000: 2 games.
