= Maksim Bokov =

Russian footballer and coach

Personal information
- Full name: Maksim Eduardovich Bokov
- Date of birth: 29 August 1973 (age 53)
- Place of birth: Leningrad, Russian SFSR
- Height: 1.77 m (5 ft 10 in)
- Position: Defender

Senior career*
| Years | Team | Apps | (Gls) |
| 1990–1996 | FC Zenit Saint Petersburg | 189 | (6) |
| 1997–2001 | PFC CSKA Moscow | 115 | (3) |
| 2002 | Uralan Elista | 20 | (0) |
| 2003–2005 | FC Terek Grozny | 91 | (2) |
| 2006 | FC Salyut-Energia Belgorod | 33 | (1) |
| Total | | 448 | (12) |

International career
| 1993 | Russia U-20 | 4 | (0) |
| 1993–1995 | Russia U-21 | 11 | (0) |
| 1997 | Russia | 3 | (0) |

Managerial career
- 2006: FC Salyut-Energia Belgorod (assistant)
- 2007: FC Mashuk-KMV Pyatigorsk (administrator)
- 2008: FC Mashuk-KMV Pyatigorsk (assistant)
- 2008: FC Mashuk-KMV Pyatigorsk (caretaker)
- 2009: FC Dmitrov
- 2010: FC Volga Tver
- 2021: PFC CSKA Moscow (U19 assistant)
- 2021–2022: FC Tekstilshchik Ivanovo (assistant)
- * Club domestic league appearances and goals

Maksim Eduardovich Bokov (Russian: Максим Эдуардович Боков; born 29 August 1973) is a Russian football coach and a former player.

== Honours ==
- Russian Premier League runner-up: 1998.
- Russian Premier League bronze: 1999.
- Russian Cup winner: 2004.
- Russian Cup runner-up: 2000.
- Top 33 players year-end list: 1996, 1997, 1998.

== International career ==
He played his first game for Russia on 7 February 1997 in a Carlsberg Cup game against Yugoslavia and played 2 more games for Russia that year.

== Personal life ==
His son Danila Bokov is also a professional footballer, he plays in goalkeeper position.
