= Gennadi Afanasyev =

Russian footballer and manager

Personal information
- Full name: Gennadi Yakovlevich Afanasyev
- Date of birth: 1 January 1943
- Date of death: 10 March 2003 (aged 60)
- Position: Midfielder

Youth career
- FC SKA Rostov-on-Don

Senior career*
Years	Team	Apps	(Gls)
1966	FC Khimik Sieverodonetsk		
1968–1969	FC Irtysh Omsk	40	(0)
1971	FC Irtysh Omsk		
1972	FC Chkalovets Novosibirsk		

Managerial career
- 1978–1979: FC Trud Shevchenko
- 1980–1981: FC Torpedo Togliatti (assistant)
- 1987: FC Rostselmash Rostov-on-Don (assistant)
- 1989: FC Lokomotiv Gorky (assistant)
- 1992–1993: FC Baltika Kaliningrad (assistant)
- 1996: FC Zhemchuzhina Sochi (assistant)
- 1997: FC Zhemchuzhina Sochi (director)
- 1998–1999: FC Zhemchuzhina Sochi (assistant)
- 1999: FC Zhemchuzhina Sochi (caretaker)
- 2000–2001: FC Chernomorets Novorossiysk (scout)
- 2002: FC Rostselmash Rostov-on-Don (scout)
- * Club domestic league appearances and goals

Gennadi (Gaur) Yakovlevich Afanasyev (Russian: Геннадий (Гаур) Яковлевич Афанасьев; 1 January 1943 – 10 March 2003) was a Russian football manager and a player.
