= Aleksandr Suchkov =

Russian footballer

Personal information
- Full name: Aleksandr Viktorovich Suchkov
- Date of birth: 29 February 1980 (age 46)
- Height: 1.77 m (5 ft 9 1/2 in)
- Position: Striker

Senior career*
Years	Team	Apps	(Gls)
1997	FC Fabus Bronnitsy	9	(0)
1998–2000	PFC CSKA-2 Moscow	89	(19)
1999	PFC CSKA Moscow	2	(0)
2001	PFC CSKA Moscow (reserves)	15	(4)
2001–2002	FC Khimki	28	(4)
2003–2005	FC Zhenis Astana	66	(4)
2006	FC Aktobe	64	(8)
2009–2010	FC Dmitrov	18	(4)
- * Club domestic league appearances and goals

Aleksandr Viktorovich Suchkov (Russian: Александр Викторович Сучков; born 29 February 1980) is a Russian former professional footballer.

== Club career ==
He made his debut in the Russian Premier League in 1999 for PFC CSKA Moscow.

== Honours ==
- Russian Premier League bronze: 1999.
- Russian Cup finalist: 2000.
