= Aleksei Savelyev =

Russian footballer

Personal information
- Full name: Aleksei Vitalyevich Savelyev
- Date of birth: 10 April 1977 (age 49)
- Place of birth: Moscow, Soviet Union
- Height: 1.75 m (5 ft 9 in)
- Position: Midfielder

Youth career
- 1992–1993: Torpedo Moscow

Senior career*
Years	Team	Apps	(Gls)
1993–1996	Torpedo Moscow	20	(1)
1993–1996	→ Torpedo-d Moscow	117	(41)
1997–2001	CSKA Moscow	92	(8)
2000	→ Lokomotiv Nizhny Novgorod (loan)	14	(2)
2001	→ Saturn Ramenskoye (loan)	10	(2)
2002–2003	Anzhi Makhachkala	56	(7)
2004	Vorskla-Naftohaz Poltava	15	(1)
2004	Tobol	17	(3)
2005	Lokomotiv Nizhny Novgorod	19	(0)
2006	Nara-Desna Naro-Fominsk	10	(0)
2006	Dynamo Bryansk	18	(1)
2007	Salyut-Energia Belgorod	34	(4)
2008	Dynamo Voronezh	26	(2)
2009	Dmitrov	17	(3)
2009	Vitebsk	12	(0)
2010	Volga Tver	8	(0)

International career
1994	Russia U19	2	(1)
1998–1999	Russia U21	16	(4)
- * Club domestic league appearances and goals

Aleksei Vitalyevich Savelyev (Russian: Алексей Витальевич Савельев; born 10 April 1977) is a retired Russian professional footballer.

== Club career ==
He made his debut in the Russian Premier League in 1994 for FC Torpedo Moscow.

== Honours ==
- Russian Premier League runner-up: 1998.
- Russian Premier League bronze: 1999.
- Russian Cup finalist: 2000.

== European competition history ==
- UEFA Cup 1996–97 with FC Torpedo Moscow: 4 games.
- UEFA Cup 2000–01 with PFC CSKA Moscow: 1 game.
