= Mamuka Tsereteli =

Georgian footballer

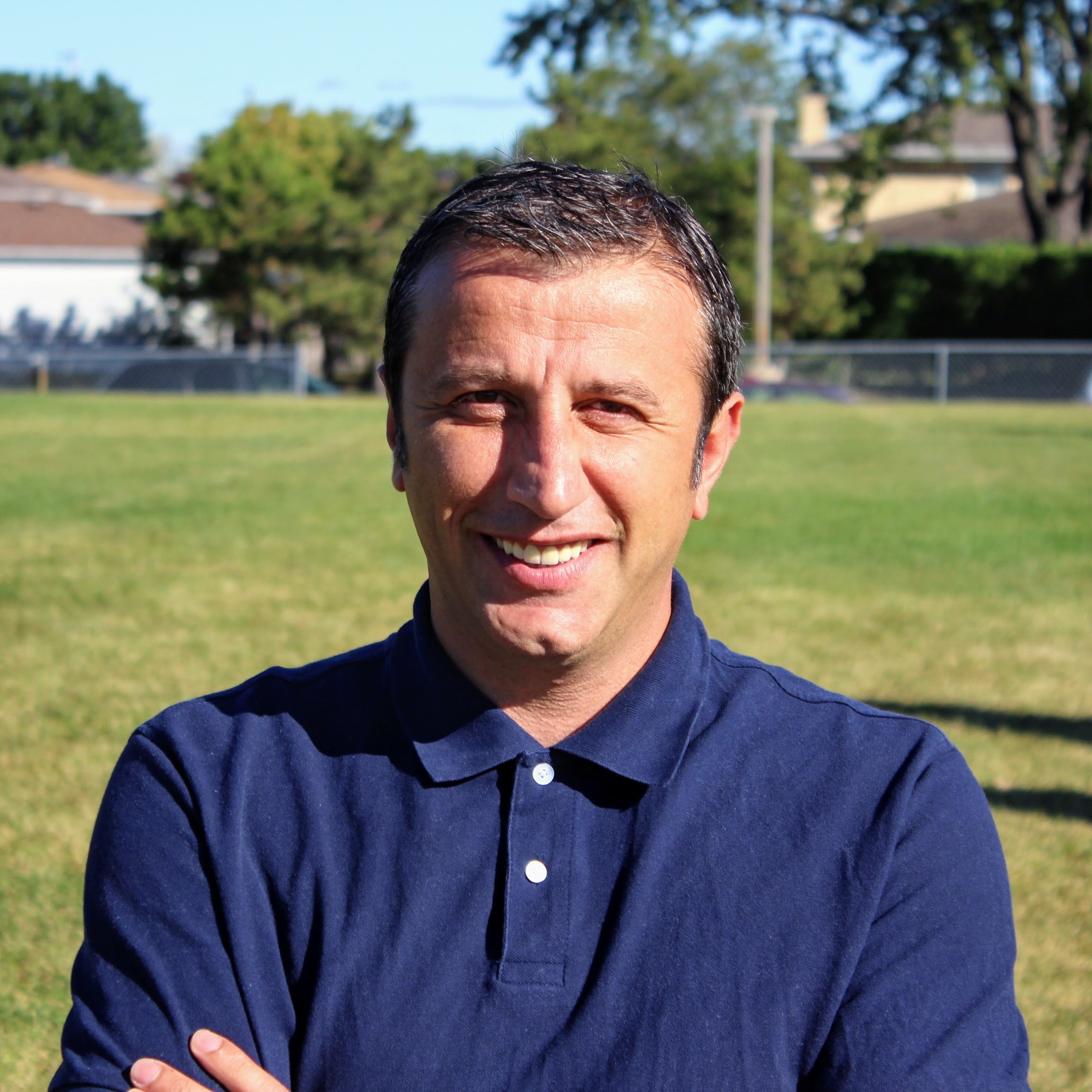
- Tsereteli in September 2017

Personal information
- Date of birth: 18 January 1979 (age 47)
- Place of birth: Soviet Union
- Height: 1.92 m (6 ft 4 in)
- Position: Defender

Senior career*
Years	Team	Apps	(Gls)
1996–1997	Dinamo Tbilisi		
1997	Ventspils	19	(1)
1998	Skonto FC	29	(1)
1998–2000	Alania Vladikavkaz	50	(1)
2001–2002	Lierse S.K.	2	(0)
2002–2003	Nea Salamis	20	(0)
2003–2004	Dinamo Tbilisi	22	(1)
2004–2005	Saba Battery	12	(2)
2005–2006	Dinamo Sokhumi	9	(1)
2006–2007	Dong Tam Long An	29	(2)

International career
?–2001	Georgia U21		(2)
1998–2004	Georgia	19	(0)
- * Club domestic league appearances and goals

Mamuka Tsereteli (Georgian: მამუკა წერეთელი; born 18 January 1979) is a Georgian former footballer.

Tsereteli started his career at Georgian football giant Dinamo Tbilisi. He was the National team under 21 captain for several years. He played for Latvia, then in Russia. He also played two games in Belgium at the start of the 2001–2002 season. After playing outside Georgia at a young age, he returned to the Caucasus in 2003.

Tsereteli capped once in UEFA Euro 2000 qualifying. He was recalled in 2004 and played 3 friendlies.

After ending his football playing career, Mamuka Tsereteli began working as a football players' manager and agent, searching for new talent all around the world. Since then, he has earned his UEFA B coaching license and USSF E and F coaching licenses. He currently coaches youth soccer in the Chicago, Illinois area.

== Interview ==
- Mamuka Tsereteli at Sport.ua (in Russian)
