= Anzor Dzamikhov =

Russian footballer and coach

Personal information
- Full name: Anzor Ratmirovich Dzamikhov
- Date of birth: 3 April 1975 (age 51)
- Place of birth: Nalchik, Russian SFSR
- Height: 1.80 m (5 ft 11 in)
- Position: Midfielder

Youth career
- Elbrus Nalchik

Senior career*
Years	Team	Apps	(Gls)
1993	FC Avtozapchast Baksan	31	(0)
1994–1995	PFC Spartak Nalchik	4	(0)
1995–1996	FC Avtozapchast Baksan	40	(6)
1997	PFC Spartak Nalchik	37	(10)
1998	FC Alania Vladikavkaz	19	(1)
1999–2000	FC Lokomotiv Nizhny Novgorod	41	(2)
2001	FC Saturn Ramenskoye	7	(1)
2001	PFC Spartak Nalchik	13	(5)
2002	FC Uralan Elista	7	(0)
2003–2004	PFC Spartak Nalchik	59	(11)
2005	FC Spartak-Naur Naurskaya		
2006	FC Volgar-Gazprom Astrakhan	5	(0)
2008	FC Malka		

Managerial career
- 2008: FC Malka (assistant)
- * Club domestic league appearances and goals

Anzor Ratmirovich Dzamikhov (Russian: Анзор Ратмирович Дзамихов; born 3 April 1975) is a Russian professional football coach and former player.

== Club career ==
He made his professional debut in the Russian Second Division in 1993 for FC Avtozapchast Baksan.
