= Tengiz Tarba =

Russian footballer

Personal information
- Full name: Tengiz Vladimirovich Tarba
- Date of birth: 7 February 1979 (age 47)
- Height: 1.85 m (6 ft 1 in)
- Position: Midfielder

Senior career*
Years	Team	Apps	(Gls)
1996–1997	FC Zhemchuzhina Sochi	0	(0)
1996–1997	→ FC Zhemchuzhina-2 Sochi (loans)	25	(0)
1998	FC Kuban Krasnodar	16	(0)
1999	FC Zhemchuzhina Sochi	12	(0)
1999	→ FC Zhemchuzhina-2 Sochi (loan)	11	(1)
2000–2001	FC Anzhi Makhachkala	0	(0)
2002	FC Krasnodar-2000 Krasnodar	11	(3)
2004	FC Sochi-04 (amateur)		
- * Club domestic league appearances and goals

Tengiz Vladimirovich Tarba (Russian: Тенгиз Владимирович Тарба; born 7 February 1979) is a former Russian football player.
