= Peniche (footballer) =

Brazilian footballer

Personal information
- Full name: Peniche Everton Romualdo
- Date of birth: January 16, 1979 (age 47)
- Place of birth: Brazil
- Height: 1.75 m (5 ft 9 in)
- Position: Midfielder

Youth career
- Corinthians

Senior career*
Years	Team	Apps	(Gls)
1997	Juventus		
1998	FC Arsenal Tula	13	(1)
1999	FC Spartak Moscow	2	(0)
1999	→ FC Spartak-2 Moscow	27	(5)
2006	União Bandeirante		
- * Club domestic league appearances and goals

Peniche Everton Romualdo or simply Peniche (born January 16, 1979) is a former Brazilian professional footballer.

== Club career ==
He made his debut in Russia in the Russian First Division in 1998 for FC Arsenal Tula.

== Honours ==
- Russian Premier League champion: 1999.
