= Ante Pešić =

Croatian footballer

Personal information
- Date of birth: 27 August 1974 (age 52)
- Height: 1.80 m (5 ft 11 in)
- Position: Defender

Senior career*
Years	Team	Apps	(Gls)
1997–1999	Šibenik	44	(1)
1999	CSKA Moscow	4	(0)
1999	CSKA Moscow II	2	(0)
1999–2000	Vukovar '91	13	(0)
- * Club domestic league appearances and goals

Ante Pešić (born 27 August 1974) is a retired Croatian football player who was the bronze medalist in the 1999 Russian Top Division with PFC CSKA Moscow.
