= Magomed Adiyev =

Russian footballer

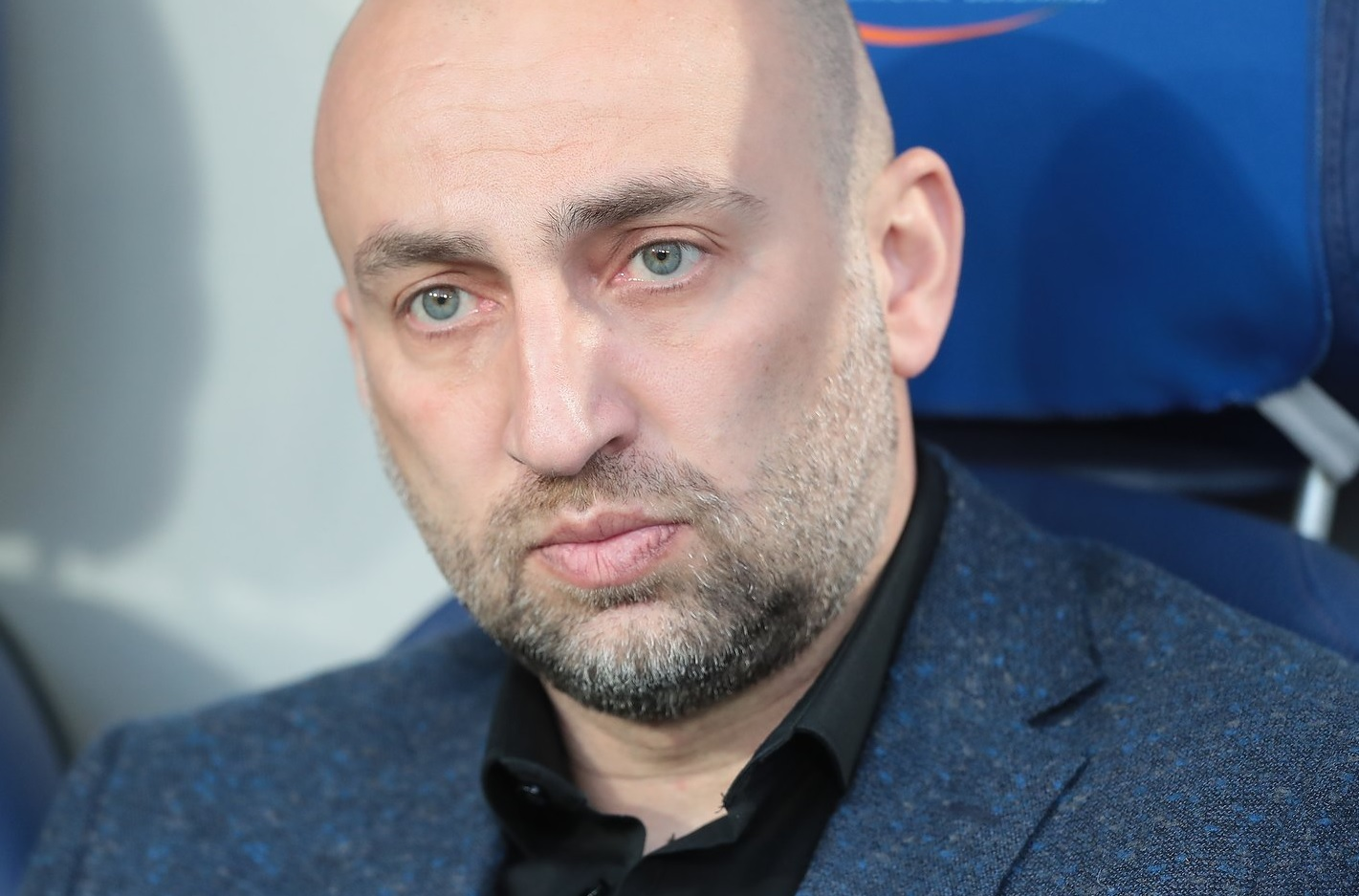
- Adiyev coaching Anzhi Makhachkala in 2019

Personal information
- Full name: Magomed Musayevich Adiyev
- Date of birth: 30 June 1977 (age 49)
- Place of birth: Grozny, Russian SFSR, Soviet Union
- Height: 1.88 m (6 ft 2 in)
- Position: Forward

Youth career
- Terek Grozny
- RSDYuShOR-2 Makhachkala

Senior career*
Years	Team	Apps	(Gls)
1994	Ingushetiya Nazran	14	(1)
1995	Anzhi-2 Makhachkala	25	(4)
1996–1998	Anzhi Makhachkala	80	(15)
1999	CSKA Moscow	4	(0)
2000	Spartak-2 Moscow	13	(0)
2000–2002	Anzhi Makhachkala	43	(5)
2002–2003	Sokol Saratov	20	(1)
2003	Zhenis	11	(5)
2004	Terek Grozny	21	(8)
2004–2006	Kryvbas Kryvyi Rih	32	(6)
2006–2008	Terek Grozny	68	(11)
2009	Nizhny Novgorod	22	(3)

International career
1999	Russia U-21	5	(2)

Managerial career
- 2010–2011: Nizhny Novgorod (assistant)
- 2011: Volga Nizhny Novgorod (reserves)
- 2012–2013: Volga Nizhny Novgorod (reserves)
- 2013–2016: Terek-2 Grozny
- 2017–2018: Legion-Dynamo Makhachkala
- 2018–2019: Anzhi Makhachkala
- 2019: Akhmat Grozny (assistant)
- 2019–2021: Chayka Peschanokopskoye
- 2021–2022: Shakhter Karagandy
- 2022–2024: Kazakhstan
- 2024: Akhmat Grozny
- 2025: Khimki
- 2025–2026: Krylia Sovetov Samara
- 2026: Maxline Vitebsk
- * Club domestic league appearances and goals

Magomed Musayevich Adiyev (Russian: Магомед Мусаевич Адиев; born 30 June 1977) is a Russian football coach and former player.

== Coaching career ==
On 14 November 2019, he signed a 1.5-year contract with Russian Football National League club FC Chayka Peschanokopskoye. He left Chayka by mutual consent on 5 February 2021.

On 16 April 2021, Shakhter Karagandy announced Adiyev as their new head coach.

On 6 May 2022, was appointed head coach of the Kazakhstan national team. In November 2022, the contract was extended for another 2 years.

On 5 April 2024, Adiyev was hired by Akhmat Grozny, while also remaining in charge of Kazakhstan. Adiyev's tenure at Akhmat started with two home defeats to Lokomotiv Moscow and to Baltika Kaliningrad, the 1–7 loss to Baltika was the season's worst loss and the worst Akhmat loss in club history, as Akhmat dropped from 12th place to the relegation-zone 15th. That was followed by league-season-best 5 consecutive victories, including away games against CSKA Moscow and Krasnodar (Krasnodar was tied for the top spot in the league at the time) as Akhmat has risen to 10th place.

On 31 May 2024, Adiyev resigned as manager of the Kazakhstan national team "for family reasons".

The contract between Magomed Adiev and Akhmat was terminated on 1 September 2024, and he left the club.

On 16 April 2025, Adiyev joined Khimki, with the task of avoiding relegation from the Russian Premier League. Under his lead, Khimki finished the season outside of the relegation zone, however, the club was administratively relegated anyway due to accumulated debts.

On 5 June 2025, Adiyev signed a one-season contract with Krylia Sovetov Samara. He left Krylia Sovetov by mutual consent on 1 April 2026, with the club in 13th place.

== Coaching statistics ==
As of match played 19 March 2026

Coaching record by team and tenure
Team	From	To	Record							
Team	From	To	M	W	D	L	GF	GA	GD	Win %
Terek-2 Grozny	7 June 2013	31 May 2017	90	20	30	40	84	117	−33	22.22
Legion Makhachkala	13 June 2017	29 December 2017	19	8	4	7	18	17	+1	42.11
Anzhi	4 June 2018	26 May 2019	32	6	6	20	15	52	−37	18.75
Chayka Peschanokopskoye	14 November 2019	5 February 2021	31	10	11	10	33	39	−6	32.26
Shakhter Karagandy	16 April 2021	26 April 2022	38	17	9	12	70	47	+23	44.74
Kazakhstan	27 April 2022	31 May 2024	21	11	1	9	28	29	−1	52.38
Akhmat Grozny	5 April 2024	31 August 2024	19	6	5	8	21	31	−10	31.58
Khimki	16 April 2025	31 May 2025	6	1	3	2	7	12	−5	16.67
Krylia Sovetov Samara	5 June 2025	Present	30	7	10	13	34	54	−20	23.33
Total			286	86	79	121	310	397	−87	30.07
