= Artyom Kovalenko =

Russian footballer

Personal information
- Full name: Artyom Pavlovich Kovalenko
- Date of birth: 6 August 1981 (age 45)
- Place of birth: Moscow, Soviet Union
- Height: 1.91 m (6 ft 3 in)
- Position: Midfielder

Youth career
- PFC CSKA Moscow

Senior career*
Years	Team	Apps	(Gls)
1999–2000	PFC CSKA Moscow	1	(0)
1999–2000	PFC CSKA-d Moscow	37	(0)
2004–2005	FC Volga Tver	38	(4)
2005	FC Presnya Moscow	12	(1)
2006–2008	FC Spartak Shchyolkovo	79	(8)
2009	FC Olimp Fryazino		
- * Club domestic league appearances and goals

Artyom Pavlovich Kovalenko (Russian: Артём Павлович Коваленко; born 6 August 1981) is a retired Russian football player.

== Honours ==
- Russian Premier League bronze: 1999.
