= Yevgeni Varlamov =

Russian footballer and coach

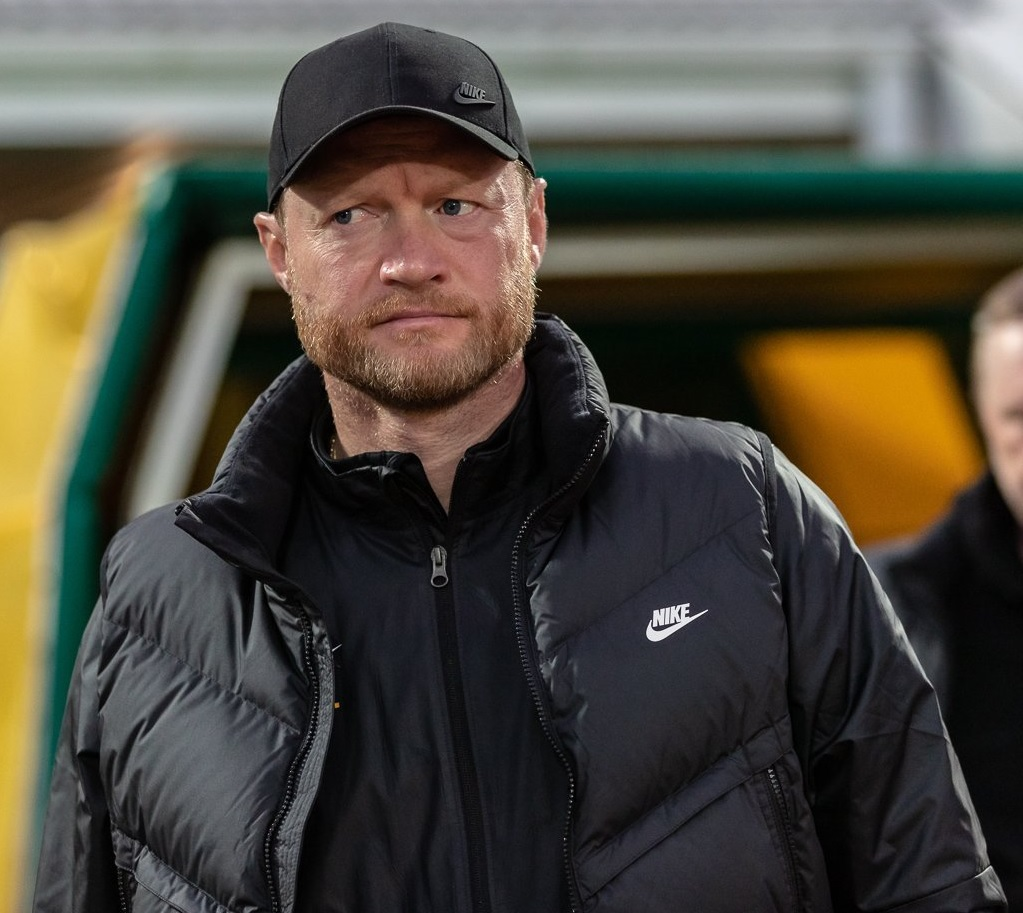
- Varlamov as a coach of Kuban Krasnodar in 2022

Personal information
- Full name: Yevgeni Vladimirovich Varlamov
- Date of birth: 25 July 1975 (age 51)
- Place of birth: Kazan, Russian SFSR
- Height: 1.89 m (6 ft 2 in)
- Position: Defender

Youth career
- DYuSSh Volna Kazan

Senior career*
Years	Team	Apps	(Gls)
1992	FC Idel Kazan	23	(2)
1992–1997	FC KAMAZ Naberezhnye Chelny	127	(13)
1998–2002	PFC CSKA Moscow	82	(8)
2003	FC Chernomorets Novorossiysk	22	(3)
2004	FC Kuban Krasnodar	2	(0)
2005	FC Metalist Kharkiv	23	(1)
2006	FC KAMAZ Naberezhnye Chelny	15	(2)
2006–2007	FC Terek Grozny	44	(5)

International career
1994	Russia U-21	4	(0)
1998–1999	Russia	10	(1)

Managerial career
- 2008–2021: CSKA Moscow (academy)
- 2021–2022: Kuban Krasnodar (assistant)
- 2023: Kuban Krasnodar (assistant)
- 2024: FC Sokol Kazan
- 2024: FC Kuban Krasnodar (assistant)
- 2024–2025: FC Sokol Kazan
- * Club domestic league appearances and goals

Yevgeni Vladimirovich Varlamov (Russian: Евгений Владимирович Варламов; born 25 July 1975) is a Russian football coach and a former player.

== Honours ==
- Russian Premier League runner-up: 1998, 2002.
- Russian Premier League bronze: 1999.
- Russian Cup winner: 2002.
- Russian Cup runner-up: 2000.

== International career ==
Varlamov played his first game for Russia on 27 May 1998 in a friendly against Poland. He played 10 games overall for Russia, scoring a goal in Euro 2000 qualifier against Ukraine.
