= Goran Gutalj =

Slovenian footballer

Personal information
- Date of birth: 12 November 1969 (age 56)
- Height: 1.82 m (6 ft 0 in)
- Position: Forward

Team information
- Current team: Veržej (manager)

Youth career
- Željezničar Sarajevo

Senior career*
Years	Team	Apps	(Gls)
1989–1992	Željezničar Sarajevo		
1992–1994	Mura	23	(7)
1994	Maribor	6	(1)
1995–1997	Beltinci	45	(10)
1997–1999	Mura	58	(21)
1999	CSKA Moscow	2	(1)
2000–2001	Gorica	44	(19)
2001–2003	Kapfenberger SV		
2003–2005	SV Allerheiligen		
2005–2006	SV Güssing		

Managerial career
- 2010–2012: Tišina
- 2012–2014: Beltinci
- 2014: Bakovci
- 2015: Rakičan
- 2016–2022: Mura veterani
- 2022–: Veržej
- * Club domestic league appearances and goals

Goran Gutalj (Serbian Cyrillic: Горан Гутаљ; born 12 November 1969) is a Slovenian football coach and former player who is the manager of Veržej. He played 176 matches in Slovenian PrvaLiga and scored 58 goals.
