= Marek Hollý =

Slovak footballer

Personal information
- Date of birth: 20 August 1973 (age 53)
- Place of birth: Martin, Czechoslovakia
- Height: 1.81 m (5 ft 11 1/2 in)
- Position: Midfielder

Senior career*
Years	Team	Apps	(Gls)
1993–1997	Sigma Olomouc	80	(3)
1997–1999	Slovan Bratislava	17	(0)
1999	Lokomotiv Nizhny Novgorod	15	(2)
1999	CSKA Moscow	14	(1)
2000	Alania Vladikavkaz	14	(1)
2000–2001	CSKA Moscow	20	(1)
2001	Anzhi Makhachkala	6	(0)
2002	Volgar-Gazprom Astrakhan	13	(0)

International career
2001	Slovakia	1	(0)
- * Club domestic league appearances and goals

Marek Hollý (born 20 August 1973) is a former Slovak professional footballer.

== Club career ==
He started his career at SK Sigma Olomouc in the Czech Gambrinus liga, where he made 80 appearances over the course of 4 seasons, scoring a total of 3 goals. He made his debut in the Russian Premier League in 1999 for FC Lokomotiv Nizhny Novgorod.

== Honours ==
- Russian Premier League bronze: 1999.
- Russian Cup finalist: 2000 (played in the early stages of the 1999–00 tournament for PFC CSKA Moscow).

== European club competitions ==
With PFC CSKA Moscow.

- UEFA Champions League 1999–2000 qualification: 2 games.
- UEFA Cup 2000–01: 1 game.
