= Andrei Krasnopjorov =

Estonian footballer

Personal information
- Full name: Andrei Krasnapjorov
- Date of birth: 5 December 1973 (age 52)
- Place of birth: Tallinn, then part of Estonian SSR, Soviet Union
- Positions: Left back; midfielder

Senior career*
Years	Team	Apps	(Gls)
- TVMK Tallinn
1995–1998	Lantana Tallinn		
1999	CSKA Moscow	1	(0)
1999	Lantana Tallinn		
2000–2002	Levadia Tallinn		
2005–2007	Nõmme Kalju		
- * Club domestic league appearances and goals as of 15:23, 1 January 2007 (UTC)

Andrei Krasnopjorov (born 5 December 1973) is a former Estonian footballer.

Krasnopjorov won two Meistriliiga titles with Lantana Tallinn and had a loan spell at CSKA Moscow in 1999. After playing just one game for the Russian Premier League club, against city rivals Lokomotiv Moscow, Krasnopjorov told then coach Oleg Dolmatov of his inability to cope with the physical pressures at the club and returned to Lantana. His former clubs also include TVMK Tallinn and Levadia Tallinn. Throughout his career, Krasnopjorov has made 203 appearances and scored 10 goals in the Estonian Meistriliiga.
