= Aleksandr Panov (footballer) =

Russian footballer

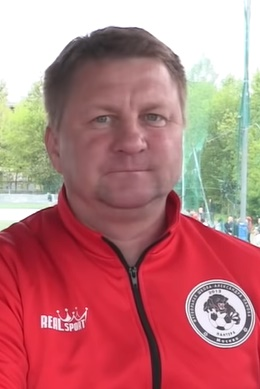
- Image of Aleksandr Vladimirovich Panov

Personal information
- Full name: Aleksandr Vladimirovich Panov
- Date of birth: 21 September 1975 (age 51)
- Place of birth: Kolpino, Soviet Union
- Height: 1.65 m (5 ft 5 in)
- Position: Striker

Youth career
- Izhorets, Zenit

Senior career*
Years	Team	Apps	(Gls)
1993–1994	Zenit-d	34	(20)
1994	Zenit Saint Petersburg	25	(4)
1995	Dynamo Vologda	3	(0)
1996	Shanghai Baosteel	12	(19)
1997–2000	Zenit Saint Petersburg	90	(25)
	Zenit-d	11	(1)
2000–2001	Saint-Étienne	15	(1)
2001	→ Lausanne-Sports (loan)	4	(0)
2002	Dynamo Moscow	24	(4)
2003	Dynamo Saint Petersburg	39	(23)
2004–2006	Torpedo Moscow	67	(27)
2006–2007	Zenit Saint Petersburg	8	(0)
2007	→ Torpedo Moscow (loan)	25	(8)
2010	Torpedo Moscow	8	(2)
Total		365	(134)

International career
1999–2004	Russia	17	(4)
- * Club domestic league appearances and goals

Aleksandr Vladimirovich Panov (Russian: Александр Владимирович Панов; born 21 September 1975) is a Russian former professional footballer who played as a striker. He spent most of his club career in Russia. At international level, he made 17 appearances scoring 4 goals for the Russia national team between 1999 and 2004.

== Career ==
Panov was a lightweight and quick striker, nicknamed "Kolpino rocket" for his speed. Among his moments of glory are two goals in the 1999 final of the Russian Cup, when he helped Zenit to a victory, and a double against France at the Stade de France on 5 June 1999 in a 3–2 win.

After a season with the farm club of Zenit Saint Petersburg Panov debuted for the first team in 1994. Panov spent a year in Vologda and another one with Shanghai Baosteel team in Shanghai. In 1997 Panov returned to Zenit and become a first team regular, earning a national team call a year later.

In mid-2000, Panov transferred to AS Saint-Étienne but was seriously injured soon after that. He returned to Russia after failing to become a regular in Saint-Étienne or FC Lausanne-Sport (loan) and played for Dynamo Moscow, Dynamo Saint Petersburg, and Torpedo Moscow. In 2006, he returned to Zenit again and he retired after a last season at Torpedo Moscow in 2010.

== International goals ==
List of international goals scored by Aleksandr Panov
#	Date	Venue	Opponent	Score	Result	Competition
1	5 June 1999	Stade de France, Saint Denis, France	France	0–1	2–3	UEFA Euro 2000 qualification
2	5 June 1999	Stade de France, Saint Denis, France	France	2–2	2–3	UEFA Euro 2000 qualification
3	18 August 1999	Dinamo Stadium, Minsk, Belarus	Belarus	0–2	0–2	Friendly match
4	14 November 2001	Skonto Stadium, Riga, Latvia	Latvia	0–3	1–3	Friendly match

== Honours ==
=== Club ===
- Russian Cup: 1999

=== Individual ===
- Russian First Division top goalscorer: 2003 (23 goals)
- Russian First Division player of the year (according to the Professional Football League): 2003
- Russian Second Division Zone 5 top scorer: 1993 (15 goals)
