= Vladimir Kulik =

Russian footballer

Personal information
- Full name: Vladimir Yuryevich Kulik
- Date of birth: 18 February 1972 (age 54)
- Place of birth: Leningrad, Russian SFSR
- Height: 1.75 m (5 ft 9 in)
- Position: Striker

Youth career
- FC Kirovets Leningrad

Senior career*
Years	Team	Apps	(Gls)
1989–1990	FC Kirovets Leningrad	62	(8)
1991–1996	FC Zenit St. Petersburg	211	(95)
1997–2001	PFC CSKA Moscow	140	(53)
2003	FC Titan Moscow	36	(16)

International career
1992	USSR U-21	1	(0)
1992–1994	Russia U-21	5	(1)
- * Club domestic league appearances and goals

Vladimir Yuryevich Kulik (Russian: Владимир Юрьевич Кулик; born 18 February 1972) is a Russian former professional footballer.

== Club career ==
He made his professional debut in the Soviet Second League in 1989 for FC Kirovets Leningrad. In 2000, Arsenal and Manchester United tried to buy Vladimir Kulik's rights. Kulik had accepted Arsenal deal, however his work license was failed cause he never played for Russian national football team. He was called up to the national team once in 1997, but remained on the bench.

== Post-playing career ==
After retirement he works as a player agent.

== Honours ==
- Russian Premier League runner-up: 1998.
- Russian Premier League bronze: 1999.
- Russian Cup winner: 2002 (played in the early stages of the 2001/02 tournament for PFC CSKA Moscow).
- Russian Cup finalist: 2000.

== European club competitions ==
With PFC CSKA Moscow.

- UEFA Champions League 1999–2000 qualification: 2 games.
- UEFA Cup 2000–01: 2 games.
