= Viktor Navochenko =

Russian footballer

Personal information
- Full name: Viktor Leonidovich Navochenko
- Date of birth: 21 August 1970 (age 56)
- Place of birth: Rozhdestveno, Russian SFSR
- Height: 1.79 m (5 ft 10 in)
- Positions: Midfielder; forward

Youth career
- ZhKO Section Stary Oskol

Senior career*
Years	Team	Apps	(Gls)
1986–1987	FC Metallurg Stary Oskol		
1988–1992	FC Salyut Belgorod	112	(17)
1993–1995	FC Tekstilshchik Kamyshin	91	(18)
1996–1998	FC Baltika Kaliningrad	95	(6)
1999	PFC CSKA Moscow	13	(0)
2000	FC Saturn Ramenskoye	20	(0)
2001	FC Uralan Elista	25	(5)
2002	FC Volgar-Gazprom Astrakhan	13	(0)
2002	FC Fakel-Voronezh Voronezh	2	(0)
2003	FC Titan Moscow	37	(4)
2004	FC Almaz Moscow	12	(0)
2004–2005	FC Ryazan-Agrokomplekt Ryazan	26	(1)
2005	FC Dynamo Bryansk	12	(0)
2006–2007	FC Nara-Desna Naro-Fominsk	54	(4)

Managerial career
- 2008: FC Volga Tver (assistant)
- 2009: FC Volga Tver
- 2009: FC Volga Tver (assistant)
- 2010: FC Volga Tver (assistant)
- 2010: FC Volga Tver
- 2012–2014: FC Volga Tver
- 2015: FC Volga Tver (assistant)
- 2015–2018: FC Energomash Belgorod
- 2018–2019: FC Avangard Kursk (assistant)
- 2019–2021: FC Ryazan
- 2021–2026: FC Salyut Belgorod
- * Club domestic league appearances and goals

Viktor Leonidovich Navochenko (Russian: Виктор Леонидович Навоченко; born 21 August 1970) is a Russian professional football coach and a former player.

== Playing career ==
As a player, he made his debut in the Soviet Second League in 1988 for Salyut Belgorod.

He made his Russian Premier League debut for FC Tekstilshchik Kamyshin on 8 March 1993 in a game against FC Luch Vladivostok. He played 8 seasons in the RPL for Tekstilshchik, FC Baltika Kaliningrad, PFC CSKA Moscow and FC Saturn Ramenskoye.

== Honours ==
=== Player ===
- Russian Premier League bronze: 1999.
- Russian Cup finalist: 2000 (played in the early stages of the 1999/2000 tournament for CSKA).

=== Coach ===
- Russian Professional Football League Zone Center best coach: 2016–17.

== European club competitions ==
- UEFA Cup 1994–95 with FC Tekstilshchik Kamyshin: 4 games.
- UEFA Intertoto Cup 1998 with FC Baltika Kaliningrad: 6 games.
