= Valeri Minko =

Russian footballer

Personal information
- Full name: Valeri Vikentyevich Minko
- Date of birth: 8 August 1971 (age 55)
- Place of birth: Barnaul, USSR
- Height: 1.89 m (6 ft 2 in)
- Position: Defender

Senior career*
Years	Team	Apps	(Gls)
1988–1989	Dynamo Barnaul	3	(0)
1989–2001	CSKA Moscow	242	(13)
2002	Kuban Krasnodar	3	(0)
Total		248	(13)

International career
1991	USSR U-20	10	(1)
1992	USSR U-21	3	(0)
1992–1993	Russia U-21	5	(0)
1996–1998	Russia	4	(0)

Managerial career
- 2008–: CSKA Moscow Reserves (assistant)
- * Club domestic league appearances and goals

Valeri Vikentyevich Minko (Russian: Валерий Викентьевич Минько; born 8 August 1971) is a former association footballer who played defender and now head coach.

He capped for USSR U-20 team at 1991 FIFA World Youth Championship.

In 1993, he was subjected to nephrectomy after being injured when playing a 1994 U-21 European Championship qualifying game against Greece (1–1). Nevertheless, he decided to continue his career with one kidney remaining and played over 200 games after his injury. Now he is considered by CSKA fans as one of symbols of courage and team spirit.
