= Oleg Șișchin =

Moldovan footballer and coach

Personal information
- Date of birth: 7 January 1975 (age 51)
- Place of birth: Chișinău, Moldavian SSR
- Height: 1.81 m (5 ft 11 1/2 in)
- Position: Midfielder

Youth career
- School #36 Chișinău

Senior career*
Years	Team	Apps	(Gls)
1995	Spumante Cricova	10	(2)
1996–1999	Constructorul Chișinău	78	(18)
1999–2000	CSKA Moscow	37	(5)
2001	Saturn Ramenskoye	16	(0)
2002	Dynamo Saint Petersburg	19	(5)
2003	Kristall Smolensk	15	(3)
2003	Khimki	20	(0)
2004–2006	Tom Tomsk	54	(9)
2007	Avangard Kursk	32	(3)
2008–2009	Inter Baku	9	(0)
2009–2010	Olimpia Bălţi	27	(5)
2010	Dacia Chișinău	5	(0)
2010–2013	Zimbru Chișinău	77	(8)
2013–2014	Academia Chișinău	9	(1)
Total		408	(59)

International career
1996–2006	Moldova	38	(1)

Managerial career
- 2014–2017: Milsami Orhei (assistant)
- * Club domestic league appearances and goals

Oleg Șișchin (/ˈʃɪʃkɪn/; born 7 January 1975) is a Moldovan professional football coach and a former player.

== Career ==
Șișchin made 38 appearances for the Moldova national football team.

Șișchin made three appearances in the 2008–09 UEFA Champions League while playing for Inter Baku.

He was one of the 11 Moldovan football players challenged and beaten by Tony Hawks and features in his book Playing the Moldovans at Tennis.

== International goals ==
Scores and results list Moldova's goal tally first.

No	Date	Venue	Opponent	Score	Result	Competition
1.	4 June 1999	BayArena, Leverkusen, Germany	Germany	1–5	1–6	Euro 2000 qualifier
