= Aleksandr Lebedev (footballer) =

Russian footballer

Personal information
- Full name: Aleksandr Nikolayevich Lebedev
- Date of birth: 1 April 1981 (age 45)
- Height: 1.76 m (5 ft 9 in)
- Position: Midfielder

Senior career*
Years	Team	Apps	(Gls)
1999	PFC CSKA Moscow	1	(0)
1999–2000	PFC CSKA-2 Moscow	22	(1)
2000	FC Fabus Bronnitsy	15	(1)
2001	FC Avtomobilist Noginsk	34	(1)
2005	FC Apatit Kirovsk		
2006	FC Sever Murmansk		
2007–2010	FC Apatit Kirovsk		
- * Club domestic league appearances and goals

Aleksandr Nikolayevich Lebedev (Russian: Александр Николаевич Лебедев; born 1 April 1981) is a former Russian professional footballer.

== Club career ==
He made his professional debut in the Russian Premier League in 1999 for PFC CSKA Moscow.

== Honours ==
- Russian Premier League bronze: 1999.
