= Dmitri Khomukha =

Turkmenistani footballer (born 1969)

Personal information
- Full name: Dmitri Ivanovich Khomukha
- Date of birth: 23 August 1969 (age 57)
- Place of birth: Firyuza, Turkmen SSR, Soviet Union (now Ashgabat, Turkmenistan)
- Height: 1.78 m (5 ft 10 in)
- Position: Midfielder

Senior career*
Years	Team	Apps	(Gls)
1985–1987	Kolkhozchi Ashkhabad	47	(1)
1989	SKA Karpaty Lviv	17	(1)
1989	Chaika-CSKA Moscow	45	(3)
1989–1994	Metalist Kharkiv	91	(3)
1994	Erzu Grozny	14	(2)
1995–1996	Zenit Saint Petersburg	61	(4)
1997–2000	CSKA Moscow	116	(27)
2001–2003	Shinnik Yaroslavl	69	(16)
2004–2005	Terek Grozny	36	(4)
Total		499	(61)

International career
	Soviet Union U21	7	(1)
1997–2004	Turkmenistan	15	(2)

Managerial career
- 2006–2010: CSKA Moscow (academy)
- 2010–2011: Russia U15
- 2011–2012: Russia U16
- 2012–2013: Russia U17
- 2013–2014: Russia U18
- 2014–2015: Russia U19
- 2015: Russia U21
- 2016: Riga
- 2017: Russia U15
- 2017–2018: Russia U16
- 2018–2019: Russia U17
- 2019–2020: Russia U18
- 2020–2021: Russia U19
- 2021–2022: Russia U15
- 2022–2023: Kaluga
- 2023: Shinnik Yaroslavl
- * Club domestic league appearances and goals

Dmitri Ivanovich Khomukha (Russian: Дмитрий Иванович Хомуха, Turkmen: Dmitriý Iwanowiç Homuha, Ukrainian: Дмитро Іванович Хомуха; born 23 August 1969) is a Turkmenistani football manager and a former player.

== Club career ==
Khomukha began to play football in Ashgabat with coach Valery Nepomnyashchy. From second grade he studied at the Ashgabat Youth Sports School with coach Täçmyrat Agamyradow. The player's career began in 1985 in the Kolkhozchi Ashkhabad team. He served in the second team of CSKA Moscow and SKA Karpaty Lviv.

== International career ==
Khomukha started his international career in U-18 Soviet Union team, but made a decision to play for Turkmenistan after dissolution of the Soviet Union. He played for the Turkmenistan national team at the request of his children's coach Täçmyrat Agamyradow. Held 11 matches for the national team of Turkmenistan. Participated in the 1998 Asian Games in Thailand.

== Coaching career ==
Khomukha graduated from the Kharkiv State Academy of Physical Culture and Moscow Higher School of Coaches. He has a UEFA PRO coaching license.

== Personal life ==
Khomukha is Ukrainian by ethnicity and also has Russian citizenship.

== Honours ==
- Russian Premier League: runner-up 1998; bronze 1999
- Russian Cup: 2004

Russia U17

- UEFA European Under-17 Championship: 2013

Russia U19

- UEFA European Under-19 Championship Runners-up: 2015
