= Andrey Rezantsev =

Uzbekistani footballer

Andrei Rezantsev
Personal information
- Full name: Andrei Borisovich Rezantsev
- Date of birth: 15 October 1965 (age 61)
- Place of birth: Torez, Ukrainian SSR
- Height: 1.80 m (5 ft 11 in)
- Position: Defender

Senior career*
Years	Team	Apps	(Gls)
1983	Neftyanik Fergana	7	(1)
1987–1990	FC Spartak Andijan	95	(1)
1990–1992	FK Neftchi Farg'ona	86	(3)
1993	FC Okean Nakhodka	28	(0)
1994	FC Spartak Anapa	10	(0)
1994–1998	FC Krylia Sovetov Samara	107	(2)
1999	FC Shinnik Yaroslavl	19	(0)
2000	FC Lada Togliatti	14	(0)

International career
1998	Uzbekistan	7	(0)
- * Club domestic league appearances and goals

Andrei Borisovich Rezantsev (Russian: Андрей Борисович Резанцев; born 15 October 1965) is a former Uzbekistani professional footballer.

== Club career ==
He made his professional debut in the Soviet Second League in 1983 for Neftyanik Fergana.

He played on five different teams managed by Aleksandr Averyanov.

== Honours ==
- Uzbek League champion: 1992.
