= Denis Pervushin =

Russian footballer and coach

Personal information
- Full name: Denis Vladimirovich Pervushin
- Date of birth: 18 January 1977 (age 49)
- Place of birth: Moscow, Soviet Union
- Height: 1.79 m (5 ft 10 1/2 in)
- Position: Defender

Team information
- Current team: Russia U16 (manager)

Youth career
- Torpedo Moscow

Senior career*
Years	Team	Apps	(Gls)
1994–1995	TRASKO Moscow	39	(1)
1995–1999	CSKA Moscow	46	(0)
1998	→ Metallurg Lipetsk (loan)	13	(0)
1998	→ Sokol Saratov (loan)	17	(0)
2000–2001	Slavia Mozyr	38	(0)
2002	Sportakademklub Moscow	26	(2)
2003	Amkar Perm	0	(0)

International career
1994	Russia U19	3	(0)
1998–1999	Russia U21	6	(0)

Managerial career
- 2018–2019: Chertanovo-2 Moscow
- 2020–2021: Chertanovo Moscow
- 2022–: Russia U16
- * Club domestic league appearances and goals

Denis Vladimirovich Pervushin (Russian: Денис Владимирович Первушин; born 18 January 1977) is a Russian professional football coach and a former player. He is the manager of the Russia national under-16 football team.

== Playing career ==
He made his professional debut in the Russian Third Division in 1994 for FC TRASKO Moscow. He played 3 games in the 1996–97 UEFA Cup for PFC CSKA Moscow.

== Honours ==
- Belarusian Premier League champion: 2000.
- Russian Premier League bronze: 1999.
