= Maksim Nizovtsev =

Kazakhstani footballer and coach

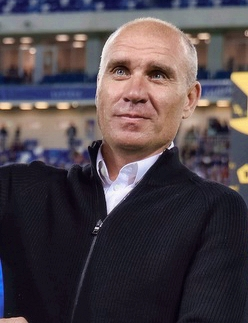
- Maksim Nizovtsev

Personal information
- Full name: Maksim Pavlovich Nizovtsev
- Date of birth: 9 September 1972 (age 54)
- Place of birth: Kostanay, Kazakh SSR
- Height: 1.81 m (5 ft 11 1/2 in)
- Position: Winger

Youth career
- DYuSSh Kostanai

Senior career*
Years	Team	Apps	(Gls)
1991–1994	FC Khimik Kostanay	126	(46)
1995–1998	FC Baltika Kaliningrad	120	(29)
1999	PFC CSKA Moscow	2	(0)
1999–2000	FC Baltika Kaliningrad	23	(4)
2001	FC Sokol Saratov	29	(2)
2002–2003	FC Chernomorets Novorossiysk	35	(3)
2004–2005	FC Tobol	64	(27)
2006	FC Aktobe	29	(3)
2008	FC Vostok	24	(4)
2009–2010	FC Baltika-M-Prodgorod Guryevsk		

International career
1994–2005	Kazakhstan	16	(2)

Managerial career
- 2011–2013: FC Baltika-M-Prodgorod Guryevsk (assistant)
- 2014–2016: FC Baltika Kaliningrad (conditioning)
- * Club domestic league appearances and goals

Maksim Pavlovich Nizovtsev (Russian: Максим Павлович Низовцев; born 9 September 1972 in Kostanay) is a Kazakhstani professional football coach and a former player. Nizovtsev has also played for the Kazakhstan national football team in 16 games scoring 2 goals from 1994 to 2005.

He previously played for FC Chernomorets Novorossiysk in the Russian Premier League.

== Career statistics ==
=== Club statistics ===
Last update: 1 January 2009

Season	Team	Country	League	Level	Apps	Goals
1991	Tobol	Kazakhstan	Premier League	1	27	2
1992	Tobol	Kazakhstan	Premier League	1	33	9
1993	Tobol	Kazakhstan	Premier League	1	38	16
1994	Tobol	Kazakhstan	Premier League	1	28	19
1995	Baltika	Russia	First Division	2	42	11
1996	Baltika	Russia	Premier League	1	31	6
1997	Baltika	Russia	Premier League	1	26	7
1998	Baltika	Russia	Premier League	1	21	5
1999	CSKA Moscow	Russia	Premier League	1	2	0
1999	Baltika	Russia	First Division	2	1	0
2000	Baltika	Russia	First Division	2	22	4
2001	Sokol Saratov	Russia	Premier League	1	29	2
2002	Chernomorets	Russia	First Division	2	32	3
2003	Chernomorets	Russia	Premier League	1	4	0
2004	Tobol	Kazakhstan	Premier League	1	34	17
2005	Tobol	Kazakhstan	Premier League	1	30	10
2006	Aktobe	Kazakhstan	Premier League	1	28	3
2008	Vostok	Kazakhstan	Premier League	1	24	4
Total		Kazakhstan	Premier League	1	215	78
		Russia	Premier League	1	113	20
		Russia	First Division	2	97	18

=== International goals ===
#	Date	Venue	Opponent	Score	Result	Competition
1.	14 June 1996	Central Stadium, Almaty, Kazakhstan	Qatar	1–0	Won	1996 AFC Asian Cup Qual.
2.	4 August 2005	Qemal Stafa, Tirana, Albania	Albania	2–1	Lost	2006 FIFA WC Qual.
Correct as of 7 October 2016

== Honours ==
with Baltika

- Russian First Division Winner: 1995

with Tobol

- Kazakhstan League Runner-up: 2005

with Aktobe

- Kazakhstan League Runner-up: 2006
