= Sergey Lapochkin (referee, born 1958) =

Russian football referee

- Full name: Sergey Konstantinovich Lapochkin
- Born: 3 October 1958 (age 68); Leningrad, Russian SFSR

Domestic
Years	League	Role
1988–1991	Soviet Top League	Referee
1992–2005	Russian Premier League	Referee

Sergey Konstantinovich Lapochkin (Russian: Сергей Константинович Лапочкин; born 3 October 1958 in Leningrad, Russian SFSR) is a retired Russian professional football referee.

His son, also named Sergey Lapochkin is a FIFA referee.
