= Aleksandr Borodkin =

Russian footballer and coach

Personal information
- Full name: Aleksandr Anatolyevich Borodkin
- Date of birth: 1 October 1971 (age 55)
- Place of birth: Moscow, Russian SFSR
- Height: 1.81 m (5 ft 11 in)
- Positions: Defender; midfielder

Team information
- Current team: FC Fakel Voronezh (assistant coach)

Youth career
- FC Spartak Moscow

Senior career*
Years	Team	Apps	(Gls)
1989–1991	FC Dynamo-2 Moscow	60	(2)
1992	FC Dynamo-d Moscow	38	(6)
1993	FC Rostselmash Rostov-on-Don	24	(0)
1994	FC Dynamo Moscow	6	(0)
1995–1996	FC Torpedo Moscow	32	(4)
1995–1996	→ FC Torpedo-Luzhniki-d	20	(2)
1997	FC Tyumen	28	(4)
1998–1999	PFC CSKA Moscow	27	(2)
1999–2002	FC Torpedo-ZIL Moscow	76	(6)

Managerial career
- 2006–2009: FC Moscow (reserves asst)
- 2013–2015: FC Torpedo Moscow (assistant)
- 2016–2019: FC Torpedo Moscow (assistant)
- 2019–: FC Fakel Voronezh (assistant)
- * Club domestic league appearances and goals

Aleksandr Anatolyevich Borodkin (Russian: Александр Анатольевич Бородкин; born 1 October 1971) is a Russian football coach and a former player. He is an assistant coach with FC Fakel Voronezh.

== Club career ==
As a player, he made his debut in the Russian Premier League in 1993 for FC Rostselmash Rostov-on-Don.

== Honours ==
- Russian Premier League runner-up: 1994, 1998.
- Russian Premier League bronze: 1999.
- Russian Cup winner: 1995.

== European club competitions ==
- UEFA Cup 1994–95 with FC Dynamo Moscow: 2 games.
- UEFA Cup 1996–97 with FC Torpedo-Luzhniki Moscow: 3 games.
