= FC Shinnik Yaroslavl =

Russian football club

Shinnik
- Full name: Football Club Shinnik Yaroslavl
- Nickname: Shina (Tyre)
- Founded: 1957; 69 years ago
- Ground: Shinnik Stadium, Yaroslavl
- Capacity: 22,990
- Owner: Yaroslavl Oblast
- General director: Galimdzhan Khayrulin
- Manager: Denis Boyarintsev
- League: Russian First League
- 2025–26: 8th of 18
- Website: shinnik.com
Home colours	Away colours

FC Shinnik Yaroslavl (Russian: Футбольный клуб «Шинник» Ярославль) is a Russian football club, based in Yaroslavl.

From 1957 to 1960 the team was called Khimik (Russian: Химик - "the chemist"). In 1961, the club became affiliated with the Yaroslavl Tyre Factory, accordingly changing its name and logo (a football inside a tyre) until the 1990s.

In the USSR championships, the team has played 1346 matches (523 wins, 376 draws, 447 defeats), with a goal difference of 1652:1499 (+153).

== League history ==
Season	Div.	Pos.	Pl.	W	D	L	GS	GA	P	Cup	Europe		Top scorer (league)
1992	RFPL	19	30	4	6	20	23	48	14	1/64	–		(Russia) Pomazov, (Russia) Moiseev – 6
1993	2nd, "Center"	6	38	17	2	9	78	47	46	1/8	–		(Russia) Smirnov – 25
1994	2nd	5	42	21	8	13	69	44	50	1/128	–		(Kazakhstan) Yablochkin – 21
1995	2nd	5	42	21	9	12	56	39	72	1/16	–		(Russia) Ilyaskin – 12
1996	2nd	2	42	24	11	7	66	32	83	1/64	–		(Kazakhstan) Yablochkin – 15
1997	RFPL	4	34	15	10	9	38	35	55	1/16	–		(Russia) Gerasimov – 9
1998	RFPL	14	30	9	8	13	30	40	35	1/16	UIC	R3	(Russia) Leonchenko, (Russia) Serebrennikov – 6
1999	RFPL	16	30	5	9	16	21	45	24	1/4	–		(Russia) Bychkov – 7
2000	2nd	4	38	20	11	7	58	33	71	1/16	–		(Russia) Bakalets, (Russia) Gavrilin – 8
2001	2nd	1	34	21	6	7	58	21	69	1/16	–		(Ukraine) Shkapenko, (Russia) Bychkov, (Russia) Gavrilin – 8
2002	RFPL	7	30	13	8	9	42	37	47	1/8	–		(Turkmenistan) Khomukha – 5
2003	RFPL	5	30	12	11	7	43	34	47	1/16	–		(Bulgaria) Kushev – 9
2004	RFPL	6	30	12	8	10	29	29	44	1/2	UIC	R3	(Russia) Shirko – 7
2005	RFPL	9	30	9	11	10	26	31	38	1/4	–		(Russia) Khazov – 5
2006	RFPL	16	30	1	8	21	17	56	11	1/8	–		(Russia) Khazov – 4
2007	2nd	1	42	28	8	6	68	30	92	1/16	–		(Ukraine) Monaryov – 20
2008	RFPL	15	30	5	7	18	25	48	22	1/16	–		(Russia) Boyarintsev – 7
2009	2nd	6	38	18	7	13	46	35	61	1/8	–		(Russia) Burmistrov – 12
2010	2nd	10	38	14	13	11	43	31	55	1/8	–		(Serbia) Vještica, (Russia) Arkhipov – 8
2011–12	FNL	4	52	25	10	17	70	56	85	1/16	–		(Russia) Nizamutdinov – 14
2012–13	FNL	11	32	9	12	11	28	33	39	1/32	–		(Belarus) Korytko – 7
2013–14	FNL	6	36	17	6	13	47	37	57	1/32	–		(Belarus) Korytko – 8
2014–15	FNL	6	34	12	17	5	44	33	53	1/16	–		(Russia) Nizamutdinov, (Russia) Samodin – 11
2015–16	FNL	12	38	13	11	14	50	49	50	1/32	–		(Russia) Malyarov – 7
2016–17	FNL	8	38	15	9	14	41	39	54	1/32	–		(Russia) Zemskov – 7
2017–18	FNL	8	38	14	11	13	45	45	53	SF	–		(Russia) Nizamutdinov – 8
2018–19	FNL	6	38	16	12	10	42	31	60	1/64	–		(Russia) Kamilov, (Russia) Geloyan, (Russia) Samodin – 7
2019–20	FNL	8	27	12	7	8	43	35	43	QF	–		(Russia) Samodin – 10
2020–21	FNL	22	42	5	10	27	39	90	25	1/32	–		(Russia) Nizamutdinov — 9
2021—22	FNL-2	1	32	25	5	2	38	8	55	1/128			(Russia) Nizamutdinov, (Russia) Azyavin — 9

=== European ===
As of match played 24 July 2004

Competition	Pld	W	D	L	GF	GA
UEFA Intertoto Cup	8	5	0	3	12	13
Total	8	5	0	3	12	13

Season	Competition	Round	Club	Home	Away	Aggregate
1998	UEFA Intertoto Cup	First round	(Finland) TPS	3–2	2–0	5–2
1998	UEFA Intertoto Cup	Second round	(Spain) Valencia	1–0	1–4	2–4
2004	UEFA Intertoto Cup	First round	(Czech Republic) Teplice	2–0	2–1	4–1
2004	UEFA Intertoto Cup	Second round	(Portugal) União de Leiria	1–4	1–2	2–6

== Current squad ==
As of 11 September 2026, according to the official First League site.

Note: Flags indicate national team as defined under FIFA eligibility rules; some limited exceptions apply. Players may hold more than one non-FIFA nationality.

No.	Pos.	Nation	Player
2	DF	RUS	Artemy Kosogorov
7	MF	RUS	Daniil Martovoy
10	FW	RUS	Albek Gongapshev
13	MF	RUS	Danila Yanov
14	MF	RUS	Gleb Kalinin
15	MF	RUS	Dmitri Samoylov
17	DF	RUS	Eduard Valiakhmetov
19	MF	RUS	Yaroslav Arbuzov (on loan from Baltika Kaliningrad)
21	MF	RUS	Denis Pushkaryov (on loan from Chelyabinsk)
23	DF	RUS	Nikita Chistyakov
24	FW	RUS	Ilya Azyavin
25	GK	RUS	Artyom Dolgov

No.	Pos.	Nation	Player
27	DF	RUS	Artur Chyorny
33	DF	RUS	Artyom Lavrenkov
49	DF	RUS	Maksim Karayev
50	MF	RUS	Artyom Golubev
53	DF	RUS	Nikita Kotin
54	MF	RUS	Ivan Shmakov
62	DF	RUS	Vadim Karpov
64	MF	RUS	Oleg Lanin
66	GK	RUS	Nikita Yanovich
77	MF	RUS	Anton Antonov
88	FW	RUS	Denis Mironov
95	GK	RUS	Denis Vambolt

=== Out on loan ===
Note: Flags indicate national team as defined under FIFA eligibility rules; some limited exceptions apply. Players may hold more than one non-FIFA nationality.

No.	Pos.	Nation	Player
—	DF	RUS	Roman Shishkov (at Ryazan until 31 December 2026)

== Notable players ==
Had international caps for their respective countries. Players whose name is listed in bold represented their countries while playing for Shinnik.

USSR/Russia

- (Soviet Union) Anatoli Isayev
- (Soviet Union) Anatoli Maslyonkin
- (Soviet Union) Nikolai Parshin
- (Commonwealth of Independent States) Valeri Kleimyonov
- (Russia) Maksim Belyayev
- (Russia) Denis Boyarintsev
- (Russia) Yevgeni Bushmanov
- (Russia) Vladimir But
- (Russia) Maksim Buznikin
- (Russia) Dmitri Chistyakov
- (Russia) Vyacheslav Dayev
- (Russia) Aleksei Gerasimenko
- (Russia) Sergey Grishin
- (Russia) (Uzbekistan) Valery Kechinov
- (Russia) Zaur Khapov
- (Russia) Oleg Kornaukhov
- (Russia) Ilya Lantratov
- (Russia) Ilya Maksimov
- (Russia) (Tajikistan) Mukhsin Mukhamadiev
- (Russia) Gennadiy Nizhegorodov
- (Russia) Sergei Pesyakov
- (Russia) Pavel Pogrebnyak
- (Russia) Dmitri Popov
- (Russia) Artyom Rebrov
- (Russia) Dmitri Sennikov
- (Russia) Roman Sharonov
- (Russia) Aleksandr Shirko
- (Russia) Vladislav Ternavski
- (Russia) **Dmitri Vasilyev**
- (Russia) **Artyom Yenin**

Europe

- (Armenia) Garnik Avalyan
- (Armenia) **Artur Sarkisov**
- (Belarus) Uladzimir Karytska
- (Belarus) **Aliaksandr Kulchiy**
- (Belarus) **Sergei Omelyanchuk**
- (Belarus) **Sergei Shtanyuk**
- (Belarus) **Alyaksey Suchkow**
- (Bosnia and Herzegovina) Darko Maletić
- (Bosnia and Herzegovina) **Emir Spahić**
- (Bulgaria) Martin Kushev
- (Bulgaria) **Zdravko Lazarov**
- (Estonia) **Sergei Terehhov**
- (Georgia (country)) Aleksandr Amisulashvili
- (Georgia (country)) **Zurab Menteshashvili**
- (Kazakhstan) **Ruslan Baltiev**
- (Kazakhstan) **Renat Dubinskiy**
- (Kazakhstan) Andrey Shkurin
- (Kazakhstan) Valeriy Yablochkin
- (Latvia) Konstantīns Igošins
- (Latvia) **Valērijs Ivanovs**
- (Latvia) **Ģirts Karlsons**
- (Latvia) **Juris Laizāns**
- (Latvia) **Valentīns Lobaņovs**
- (Latvia) **Andrejs Rubins**
- (Latvia) **Igors Stepanovs**
- (Latvia) Armands Zeiberliņš
- (Moldova) **Victor Berco**
- (Moldova) Valeriu Catinsus
- (Moldova) Vladimir Cosse
- (Moldova) Ghenadie Olexici
- (Poland) Damian Gorawski
- (Serbia and Montenegro) Goran Trobok
- (Slovenia) **Darijan Matič**
- (Slovenia) **Aleksandar Radosavljević**
- (Ukraine) Ilya Blyzniuk
- (Ukraine) Yevhen Drahunov
- (Ukraine) **Yuriy Dmitrulin**
- (Ukraine) **Yevhen Lutsenko**
- (Ukraine) Serhiy Serebrennikov
- (Ukraine) **Vyacheslav Shevchuk**
- (Ukraine) Pavlo Shkapenko
- (Ukraine) Serhiy Snytko
- (Ukraine) **Mykhailo Starostyak**
- (Ukraine) Artem Yashkin

Africa

- (Cameroon) André Bikey
- (Cameroon) Serge Branco

Asia

- (Tajikistan) **Arsen Avakov**
- (Tajikistan) **Rahmatullo Fuzailov**
- (Tajikistan) Farkhod Vasiev
- (Turkmenistan) **Dmitri Khomukha**
- (Uzbekistan) **Victor Karpenko**
- (Uzbekistan) **Leonid Koshelev**
- (Uzbekistan) Sergei Lebedev
- (Uzbekistan) **Aleksey Nikolaev**
- (Uzbekistan) Andrei Rezantsev
- (Uzbekistan) **Yevgeni Safonov**
- (Uzbekistan) Nikolai Sergiyenko
- (Uzbekistan) **Vladimir Shishelov**

== See also ==
- Aleksei Kazalov, assistant manager of the club
