= FC Dmitrov =

Russian football club

PFC Dmitrov
- Full name: Professional Football Club Dmitrov
- Founded: 1997
- Dissolved: 2013
- Ground: Lokomotiv
- Chairman: ?
- Manager: Sergei Palchikov
- League: Amateur Football League
- 2009: Russian Second Division, Zone West, 10th

PFC Dmitrov (Russian: ПФК «Дмитров») is a Russian football club from Dmitrov, founded in 1997. Its first season on the professional level was 2008 in the Russian Second Division, where it played in 2009. In 2010, it voluntarily dropped out of the Russian Second Division.
