= 1994 in Russian football =

1994 season

1994 was the third season Russia held its own national football competition since the breakup of the Soviet Union.

== Club competitions ==
FC Spartak Moscow won the league for the third time in a row.

Lower leagues were re-organized, with second-highest First League converted to one zone and a new professional Third League started.

For more details, see:

- 1994 Russian Top League
- 1994 Russian First League
- 1994 Russian Second League
- 1994 Russian Third League

== Cup competitions ==
The second edition of the Russian Cup, 1993–94 Russian Cup was won by FC Spartak Moscow, who beat PFC CSKA Moscow in the finals in a shootout 4-2 after finishing extra time at 2-2.

Early stages of the 1994–95 Russian Cup were played later in the year.

== European club competitions ==
=== 1993–94 UEFA Champions League ===
FC Spartak Moscow finished the group stage in third place, not qualifying for the semifinals.

- March 2, 1994 / Group A, Day 3 / FC Spartak Moscow - FC Barcelona 2-2 (Rodionov 79' Karpin 87' - Stoichkov 10' Romário 68') / Moscow, Luzhniki Stadium / Attendance: 60,000

FC Spartak Moscow: Staučė, Khlestov, Ivanov, Tsymbalar, Pisarev (Rodionov, 46), Nikiforov, Ternavski, Karpin (captain), Piatnitski, Lediakhov, Beschastnykh.

- March 15, 1994 / Group A, Day 4 / FC Barcelona - FC Spartak Moscow 5-1 (Stoichkov 34' Amor 76' Koeman 78' 81' Romário 87' - Karpin 3') / Barcelona, Camp Nou / Attendance: 100,000

FC Spartak Moscow: Staučė, Khlestov, Ivanov, Tsymbalar, Ternavski, Nikiforov, Onopko (captain), Karpin, Piatnitski, Lediakhov (Rodionov, 46), Beschastnykh (Pisarev, 73).

- March 30, 1994 / Group A, Day 5 / FC Spartak Moscow - AS Monaco FC 0-0 / Moscow, Luzhniki Stadium / Attendance: 30,000

FC Spartak Moscow: Staučė, Mamedov, Ternavski (Khlestov, 75), Tsymbalar, Rodionov (Pisarev, 61), Nikiforov, Onopko (captain), Karpin, Piatnitski, Lediakhov, Beschastnykh.

- April 13, 1994 / Group A, Day 6 / Galatasaray - FC Spartak Moscow 1-2 (Cihat 87' - Onopko 53' Karpin 85') / Istanbul, Ali Sami Yen Stadium / Attendance: 17,000

FC Spartak Moscow: Staučė, Mamedov, Ternavski, Tsymbalar (Lediakhov, 77), Pisarev, Nikiforov, Onopko (captain), Karpin, Piatnitski, Masalitin (Alenichev, 80), Beschastnykh.

=== 1993–94 UEFA Cup Winners' Cup and 1993–94 UEFA Cup ===
All the Russian participants were eliminated in 1993.

=== 1994–95 UEFA Champions League ===
FC Spartak Moscow qualified directly for the group stage. It did not qualify from the group, coming in third place.

- September 14, 1994 / Group B, Day 1 / FC Dynamo Kyiv - FC Spartak Moscow 3-2 (Leonenko 48' 76' Rebrov 86' - Pisarev 12' Tikhonov 38') / Kyiv, Republican Stadium / Attendance: 90,500

Dynamo penalty kick by Mykhaylenko in the 24th minute was saved by Tyapushkin.
FC Spartak Moscow: Tyapushkin, Mamedov, Ternavski, Tsymbalar, Rakhimov, Chudin, Naduda, Alenichev (Mukhamadiev, 61), Piatnitski (captain), Pisarev, Tikhonov (Rodionov, 43).

- September 28, 1994 / Group B, Day 2 / FC Spartak Moscow - Paris Saint-Germain F.C. 1-2 (Rakhimov 40' Mamedov (red card) 60' - Le Guen 54' Valdo 61') / Moscow, Luzhniki Stadium / Attendance: 47,000

FC Spartak Moscow: Tyapushkin, Mamedov, Tikhonov, Tsymbalar, Rakhimov, Nikiforov, Onopko (captain), Khlestov, Piatnitski, Pisarev, Mukhamadiev (Alenichev, 68).

- October 19, 1994 / Group B, Day 3 / FC Spartak Moscow - FC Bayern Munich 1-1 (Pisarev 78' - Babbel 90') / Moscow, Luzhniki Stadium / Attendance: 25,000

FC Spartak Moscow: Tyapushkin, Ananko, Kechinov, Tsymbalar, Rakhimov, Nikiforov (Ternavski, 85), Onopko (captain), Tikhonov, Piatnitski, Pisarev, Mukhamadiev (Konovalov, 75).

- November 2, 1994 / Group B, Day 4 / FC Bayern Munich - FC Spartak Moscow 2-2 (Nerlinger 29' Kuffour 37' - Tikhonov 4' Alenichev 33') / Munich, Olympic Stadium / Attendance: 31,000

FC Spartak Moscow: Tyapushkin, Ananko, Khlestov, Alenichev, Rakhimov, Nikiforov, Onopko (captain), Tikhonov, Piatnitski, Pisarev (Naduda, 85), Kechinov.

- November 23, 1994 / Group B, Day 5 / FC Spartak Moscow - FC Dynamo Kyiv 1-0 (Mukhamadiev 53') / Moscow, Luzhniki Stadium / Attendance: 35,000

FC Spartak Moscow: Tyapushkin, Khlestov, Lipko, Alenichev, Rakhimov, Nikiforov, Onopko (captain), Tikhonov, Piatnitski (Naduda, 88), Pisarev (Konovalov, 64), Mukhamadiev.

- December 7, 1994 / Group B, Day 6 / Paris Saint-Germain F.C. - FC Spartak Moscow 4-1 (Weah 27' 52' Ginola 42' Raí 60' - Rodionov 67') / Paris, Parc des Princes / Attendance: 31,461

Spartak penalty kick by Kechinov came off the post in the 57th minute.
FC Spartak Moscow: Tyapushkin, Khlestov, Lipko, Alenichev, Kechinov (Konovalov, 74), Nikiforov, Onopko (captain), Tikhonov, Piatnitski, Pisarev, Mukhamadiev (Rodionov, 46).

=== 1994–95 UEFA Cup Winners' Cup ===
PFC CSKA Moscow were eliminated in the first round.

- September 15, 1994 / First Round, First Leg / PFC CSKA Moscow - Ferencvárosi TC 2-1 (Mamchur 50' Sergeyev 74' - Kenneth Christiansen 58') / Moscow, Dynamo Stadium / Attendance: 9,000

PFC CSKA Moscow: Novosadov, Radimov, Kolotovkin, Mashkarin, Mamchur, Shoukov (Semak, 62), Antonovich, Broshin, Sinyov, Tatarchuk (Sergeyev, 46), Faizulin.

- September 29, 1994 / First Round, Return Leg / Ferencvárosi TC - PFC CSKA Moscow 2-1 (Lipcsei 36' Neagoe 45' - Radimov 15' Faizulin (red card) 53'); 7-6 in shootout (Gregor (penalty scored) Lisztes (penalty scored) Kenneth Christiansen (penalty scored) Telek (penalty scored) Lipcsei (penalty scored) Zavadszky (penalty scored) Hrutka (penalty scored) - Bystrov (penalty scored) Bushmanov (penalty scored) Demchenko (penalty scored) Mamchur (penalty scored) Minko (penalty scored) Broshin (penalty scored) Kolotovkin (penalty missed) ) / Budapest, Üllői úti stadion / Attendance: 18,000

PFC CSKA Moscow: Novosadov, Radimov, Kolotovkin, Bystrov, Mamchur, Mashkarin (Bushmanov, 46), Sinyov (Demchenko, 71), Broshin, Minko, Shoukov, Faizulin.

=== 1994–95 UEFA Cup ===
FC Rotor Volgograd and FC Tekstilshchik Kamyshin were both eliminated by FC Nantes in the first and second round respectively, with Nicolas Ouédec scoring 7 goals in 4 games. FC Dynamo Moscow were eliminated in the second round.

- September 13, 1994 / first round, first leg / R.F.C. Seraing – FC Dynamo Moscow 3–4 (Wamberto 68' Schaessens 74' Edmilson 88' – Smirnov 18' Cheryshev 28' 61' Simutenkov 43' (pen.)) / Seraing, Pairay Stadium / attendance: 7,172

FC Dynamo Moscow: Smetanin, Timofeev, Samatov, Shulgin, Smirnov, Chernyshov (captain), Klyuyev, Cheryshev, Tetradze (Borodkin, 69), Ivanov, Simutenkov.

- September 13, 1994 / first round, first leg / FC Rotor Volgograd – FC Nantes 3–2 (Gerashchenko 42' Nechay 65' Veretennikov 77' – Ouédec 28' N'Doram 83') / Volgograd, Central Stadium / attendance: 38,000

FC Rotor Volgograd: Samorukov, Zhunenko, Burlachenko, Gerashchenko (captain), Nechay, Tsarenko, Yeshchenko (Shmarko, 69), Niederhaus (Berketov, 87), Veretennikov, Yesipov, Nechayev.

- September 13, 1994 / first round, first leg / FC Tekstilshchik Kamyshin – Békéscsaba 6–1 (Gusakov 38' Polstyanov 55' 90' Volgin 58' Filippov 80' 90' – Szarvas 15') / Moscow, Dynamo Stadium / attendance: 2,000

FC Tekstilshchik Kamyshin: Filimonov, A. Morozov, Minayev (captain), Yudin, Zhabko, O. Morozov, Navochenko, Tsygankov (Rozin, 72), Filippov, Volgin, Gusakov (Polstyanov, 51).

- September 27, 1994 / first round, return leg / FC Dynamo Moscow – R.F.C. Seraing 0–1 (Schaessens 89') / Moscow, Dynamo Stadium / attendance: 5,000

FC Dynamo Moscow: Smetanin, Timofeev, Samatov, S. Nekrasov, Smirnov (Kutsenko, 41), Chernyshov (captain), Klyuyev, Cheryshev, Yakhimovich, Ivanov, Simutenkov.

- September 27, 1994 / first round, return leg / FC Nantes – FC Rotor Volgograd 3–0 (Ouédec 29' 61' Loko 75') / Nantes, La Beaujoire / attendance: 36,000

Nantes penalty kick by Ouédec in the 72nd minute missed the goal.
FC Rotor Volgograd: Samorukov, Zhunenko, Burlachenko, Gerashchenko (captain), Nechay, Tsarenko, Yeshchenko (Khuzin, 60), Niederhaus, Veretennikov (Troynin, 75), Yesipov, Nechayev.

- September 27, 1994 / first round, return leg / Békéscsaba – FC Tekstilshchik Kamyshin 1–0 (Csató 77' (pen.)) / attendance: 2,000

FC Tekstilshchik Kamyshin: Filimonov, A. Morozov, Minayev (captain), Prokhorov, Tsygankov, O. Morozov, Navochenko, Rozin, Pimenov (Natalushko, 46), Volgin, Filippov (Kuznetsov, 72).

- October 18, 1994 / second round, first leg / FC Dynamo Moscow – Real Madrid 2–2 (Simutenkov 65' Cheryshev 69' – Sandro 21' Zamorano 73') / Moscow, Dynamo Stadium / attendance: 7,000

FC Dynamo Moscow: Smetanin, Timofeev, Kovtun, S. Nekrasov, Samatov, Chernyshov (captain), Klyuyev, Cheryshev, Yakhimovich, Ivanov, Simutenkov.

- October 19, 1994 / second round, first leg / FC Nantes – FC Tekstilshchik Kamyshin 2–0 (Ouédec 32' (pen.) 61') / Nantes, La Beaujoire / attendance: 34,000

FC Tekstilshchik Kamyshin: Filimonov, A. Morozov, Minayev (captain), Yudin, Zhabko, O. Morozov (Rozin, 87), Navochenko, Tsygankov, Filippov, Volgin, Natalushko (Pimenov, 84).

- November 1, 1994 / second round, return leg / Real Madrid – FC Dynamo Moscow 4–0 (Zamorano 48' Redondo 75' Dani 88' 90') / Madrid, Santiago Bernabéu Stadium / attendance: 60,000

FC Dynamo Moscow: Smetanin, Samatov, Kovtun, Khidiyatullin (Borodkin, 61), Shulgin, S. Nekrasov, Filippov (Klyuyev, 12), Cheryshev, Yakhimovich, Ivanov, Simutenkov.

- November 1, 1994 / second round, return leg / FC Tekstilshchik Kamyshin – FC Nantes 1–2 (Polstyanov 68' – Ouédec 47' 64') / Moscow, Dynamo Stadium / attendance: 7,000

FC Tekstilshchik Kamyshin: Filimonov, A. Morozov (Polstyanov, 64), Minayev (captain), Yudin, Zhabko, O. Morozov, Navochenko, Rozin, Filippov, Pimenov, Natalushko.

== National team ==
Russia national football team played at the 1994 FIFA World Cup, not qualifying from the group, even though Oleg Salenko became the top scorer of the competition. In late 1993, 14 players signed a letter demanding the resignation of Pavel Sadyrin and appointment of Anatoliy Byshovets as the manager. Sadyrin stayed as the manager. Some of the players who signed returned to the team, but several (Igor Dobrovolski, Igor Shalimov, Igor Kolyvanov, Sergei Kiriakov, Vasili Kulkov, Andrei Kanchelskis and Andrei Ivanov) did not play at the World Cup. After the tournament, Sadyrin was replaced by Oleg Romantsev for the subsequent games.

- January 29, 1994 / Friendly / United States - Russia 1-1 (Lalas 86' - Radchenko 52') / Seattle, Kingdome / Attendance: 43,700

Russia: Khapov, Gorlukovich, Galiamin, Popov, D. Kuznetsov (Cheryshev, 74), Tetradze, Tatarchuk (Tedeyev, 57), Korneev (Rakhimov, 83), Salenko, Borodyuk (captain), Radchenko.

- February 2, 1994 / Friendly / Mexico - Russia 1-4 (García Aspe 26' (pen.) - Borodyuk 4' 45' 56' Radchenko 38') / Oakland, The Oakland Coliseum / Attendance: 18,162

Russia: Khapov, Gorlukovich, Galiamin, Popov (Podpaly, 79), D. Kuznetsov, Tetradze, Korneev, Tedeyev (Cheryshev, 70), Salenko, Borodyuk (captain), Radchenko (Tatarchuk, 85).

- March 23, 1994 / Friendly / Ireland - Russia 0-0 / Dublin, Lansdowne Road / Attendance: 36,000

Russia: Kharine, Gorlukovich, Rakhimov, Kovtun, Tetradze, Korneev (Cheryshev, 58), Popov, D. Kuznetsov, Salenko, Borodyuk (captain), Radchenko (Kosolapov, 87).

- April 20, 1994 / Friendly / Turkey - Russia 0-1 (Radchenko 10') / Bursa, Bursa Atatürk Stadium / Attendance: 28,000

Russia: Kharine, Galiamin, Nikiforov (Tatarchuk, 81), Tsymbalar, Gorlukovich, Ternavski, D. Kuznetsov, Popov, Borodyuk (captain) (Beschastnykh, 60), Yuran (Onopko, 46), Radchenko (Lediakhov, 87).

- May 29, 1994 / Friendly / Russia - Slovakia 2-1 (Piatnitski 49' Tsymbalar 59' - Tittel 34') / Moscow, Luzhniki Stadium / Attendance: 8,000

Russia: Kharine (captain), Galiamin, Onopko, Nikiforov, D. Kuznetsov, Ternavski, Piatnitski, Tsymbalar, Salenko, Mostovoi, Radchenko.

- June 20, 1994 / 1994 FIFA World Cup, Group B / Brazil - Russia 2-0 (Romário 27' Raí 54' (pen.)) / Stanford Stadium, Stanford / Attendance: 81,061

Russia: Kharine (captain), Nikiforov, Gorlukovich, Khlestov, D. Kuznetsov, Ternavski, Piatnitski, Karpin, Tsymbalar, Yuran (Salenko, 56), Radchenko (Borodyuk, 76).

- June 24, 1994 / 1994 FIFA World Cup, Group B / Sweden - Russia 3-1 (Brolin 37' (pen.) Dahlin 60' 82' - Salenko 5' (pen.) Gorlukovich (yellow card) 49' (yellow-red card) ) / Pontiac, Pontiac Silverdome / Attendance: 71,528

Russia: Kharine (captain), Gorlukovich, Nikiforov, D. Kuznetsov, Khlestov, Popov (Karpin, 40), Onopko, Mostovoi, Borodyuk (Galiamin, 50), Salenko, Radchenko.

- June 28, 1994 / 1994 FIFA World Cup, Group B / Cameroon - Russia 1-6 (Milla 47' - Salenko 16' 41' 45' (pen.) 73' 75' Radchenko 82') / Stanford Stadium, Stanford / Attendance: 74,914

Russia: Cherchesov, Khlestov, Nikiforov, Ternavski, Onopko (captain), Tsymbalar, Tetradze, Korneev (Radchenko, 65), Karpin, Lediakhov (Beschastnykh, 77), Salenko.

- August 17, 1994 / Friendly / Austria - Russia 0-3 (Beschastnykh 42' Nikiforov 52' Simutenkov 82' (pen.)) / Klagenfurt, Wörtherseestadion / Attendance: 11,000

Russia: Cherchesov (Kharine, 46), Mamedov, Ternavski (Kulkov, 59), Tsymbalar, Rakhimov (Radimov, 46), Nikiforov, Onopko (captain), Yesipov (Mandreko, 46), Beschastnykh, Tetradze (Kosolapov, 83), Simutenkov (Niederhaus, 83).

- September 7, 1994 / Friendly / Russia - Germany 0-1 (Kuntz 7') / Moscow, Luzhniki Stadium / Attendance: 40,000

Russia: Cherchesov, Mamedov, Kulkov, Tsymbalar, Shalimov (Tetradze, 46), Nikiforov, Onopko (captain), Kanchelskis (Karpin, 46), Piatnitski, Kolyvanov (Radchenko, 46), Kiriakov.

- October 12, 1994 / UEFA Euro 1996 qualifier / Russia - San Marino 4-0 (Karpin 43' Kolyvanov 64' Nikiforov 65' Radchenko 67') / Moscow, Luzhniki Stadium / Attendance: 10,000

Russia: Cherchesov, Kulkov (Tetradze, 62), Nikiforov, Tsymbalar (Kolyvanov, 55), Shalimov, Karpin, Onopko (captain), Kanchelskis, Radchenko, Piatnitski, Kiriakov.

- November 16, 1994 / UEFA Euro 1996 qualifier / Scotland - Russia 1-1 (Booth 20' - Radchenko 25') / Glasgow, Hampden Park / Attendance: 31,254

Russia: Cherchesov, Kulkov, Nikiforov, Gorlukovich, Shalimov, Karpin, Onopko (captain), Kanchelskis, Piatnitski (Tetradze, 75), Radchenko, Radimov.
