= Aleksey Morozov (footballer) =

Russian footballer

Personal information
- Full name: Aleksey Slaviyevich Morozov
- Date of birth: 3 January 1966 (age 60)
- Place of birth: Obninsk, Russian SFSR
- Height: 1.73 m (5 ft 8 in)
- Positions: Defender; midfielder

Team information
- Current team: FC Kvant Obninsk (assistant coach)

Youth career
- FC Kvant Obninsk

Senior career*
Years	Team	Apps	(Gls)
1983–1984	FC Dynamo Moscow	0	(0)
1985	FC Dynamo Kashira	28	(2)
1986–1988	FC Dynamo-2 Moscow	99	(4)
1989–1991	FC Fakel Voronezh	110	(0)
1992–1995	FC Tekstilshchik Kamyshin	115	(2)
1996–1998	FC Fakel Voronezh	89	(1)
1999–2000	FC Saturn Ramenskoye	9	(0)
2000	FC Lokomotiv Nizhny Novgorod	12	(0)
2001	FC Obninsk (amateur)		
2002	FC Almaz Moscow (amateur)		

Managerial career
- 2002–2008: FC Kvant Obninsk (academy)
- 2009: FC Kvant Obninsk
- 2012–2017: FC Kvant Obninsk
- 2018–: FC Kvant Obninsk (assistant)
- * Club domestic league appearances and goals

Aleksey Slaviyevich Morozov (Russian: Алексей Славиевич Морозов; born 3 January 1966) is a Russian professional football coach and a former player who is an assistant coach with FC Kvant Obninsk.

== Club career ==
He made his professional debut in the Soviet Second League in 1988 for FC Dynamo-2 Moscow. He played 4 games in the 1994–95 UEFA Cup with FC Tekstilshchik Kamyshin.

Throughout his career he always played on the same team as his identical twin brother Oleg Morozov.
