= Oleg Morozov (footballer, born 1966) =

Russian footballer and manager

Personal information
- Full name: Oleg Slaviyevich Morozov
- Date of birth: 3 January 1966 (age 60)
- Place of birth: Obninsk, Russian SFSR
- Height: 1.73 m (5 ft 8 in)
- Position: Midfielder

Team information
- Current team: FC Kvant Obninsk (manager)

Youth career
- Kvant Obninsk

Senior career*
Years	Team	Apps	(Gls)
1983–1988	Dynamo Moscow	0	(0)
1985	→ FC Dynamo Kashira	31	(5)
1986–1988	→ Dynamo-2 Moscow	96	(7)
1989–1991	Fakel Voronezh	114	(6)
1992–1995	Tekstilshchik Kamyshin	114	(8)
1996–1998	Fakel Voronezh	103	(7)
1999–2000	Saturn Ramenskoye	35	(0)
2000	Lokomotiv Nizhny Novgorod	13	(0)
2001	Obninsk (amateur)		
2002	Almaz Moscow (amateur)		

Managerial career
- 2006–2008: Kvant Obninsk
- 2010–2012: Kvant Obninsk
- 2018–: Kvant Obninsk
- * Club domestic league appearances and goals

Oleg Slaviyevich Morozov (Russian: Олег Славиевич Морозов; born 3 January 1966) is a Russian professional football coach and a former player. He is the manager of FC Kvant Obninsk.

== Club career ==
He made his professional debut in the Soviet Second League in 1985 for Dynamo Kashira. He played 4 games in the UEFA Cup 1994–95 with FC Tekstilshchik Kamyshin.

Throughout his career he always played on the same team as his identical twin brother Aleksey Morozov.
