= Sergei Natalushko =

Russian footballer (born 1960)

Personal information
- Full name: Sergei Vladimirovich Natalushko
- Date of birth: 13 September 1960 (age 66)
- Place of birth: Zaozyorny, Russian SFSR
- Height: 1.92 m (6 ft 3 1/2 in)
- Position: Forward

Senior career*
| Years | Team | Apps | (Gls) |
| 1983–1988 | FC Tekstilshchik Kamyshin | 10 | (3) |
| 1989 | FC Avangard Kamyshin | | |
| 1989–1992 | FC Tekstilshchik Kamyshin | 120 | (24) |
| 1992–1993 | FC Avangard Kamyshin | 19 | (5) |
| 1993–1997 | FC Tekstilshchik Kamyshin | 120 | (27) |
| 1997 | FC Metallurg Lipetsk | 7 | (2) |
| 1998–2000 | FC Saturn Ramenskoye | 49 | (16) |
| 2000 | FC Neftekhimik Nizhnekamsk | 13 | (2) |
| 2002–2005 | FC Tekstilshchik Kamyshin | 28 | (2) |

Managerial career
- 2004: FC Tekstilshchik Kamyshin (administrator)
- * Club domestic league appearances and goals

Sergei Vladimirovich Natalushko (Russian: Серге́й Владимирович Наталушко; born 13 September 1960) is a former Russian professional footballer.

== Club career ==
He made his professional debut in the Soviet Second League in 1988 for FC Tekstilshchik Kamyshin. He played three games in the UEFA Cup 1994–95 for FC Tekstilshchik Kamyshin.
