= Valeri Kleymyonov (footballer, born 1975) =

Russian footballer

Personal information
- Full name: Valeri Vladimirovich Kleymyonov
- Date of birth: 18 December 1975 (age 50)
- Height: 1.76 m (5 ft 9 1/2 in)
- Positions: Forward; midfielder

Youth career
- DYuSSh Novoanninsky
- UOR Volgograd

Senior career*
| Years | Team | Apps | (Gls) |
| 1991–1993 | FC Tekstilshchik Kamyshin | 20 | (1) |
| 1992 | → FC Tekstilshchik-d Kamyshin (loan) | 21 | (10) |
| 1993 | FC Avangard Kamyshin | 14 | (1) |
| 1994–1995 | FC SKA Rostov-on-Don | 36 | (4) |
| 1996 | FC Energiya-Tekstilshchik Kamyshin | 2 | (0) |
| 1996 | FC Avangard Kamyshin (amateur) | | |
| 1998–1999 | FC Torpedo Volzhsky | 46 | (9) |
| 1999 | FC Lada Togliatti | 9 | (0) |
| 2000–2003 | FC Lisma-Mordovia Saransk | 119 | (26) |
| 2004–2005 | FC Torpedo Volzhsky | 32 | (4) |
| 2005 | FC Lokomotiv-NN Nizhny Novgorod | 14 | (1) |
| 2006 | FC Gazovik Orenburg | 22 | (2) |
| 2007 | FC Kavkaztransgaz-2005 Ryzdvyany | 3 | (0) |
- * Club domestic league appearances and goals

Valeri Vladimirovich Kleymyonov (Russian: Валерий Владимирович Клеймёнов; born 18 December 1975) is a former Russian football player.
