= Pavlyuchenko =

Pavlyuchenko, Pavliuchenko (Ukrainian: Павлюченко; Russian: Павлюченко; Bulgarian: Павлюченко), Pauliuchenka, Paŭliučenka (Belarusian: Паўлючэнка) or Pavljučenko (Serbo-Croatian Cyrillic: Пављученко) is an Eastern Slavic surname. Notable people with the surname include:

- Daria Pavliuchenko (born 2002), Russian pair skater
- Konstantin Pavlyuchenko (born 1971), Kazakhstani-Ukrainian footballer
- Pavel Pavlyuchenko (born 1998), Belarusian footballer
- Roman Pavlyuchenko (born 1981), Russian footballer
