= Semyon Bobrov (footballer) =

Russian football player

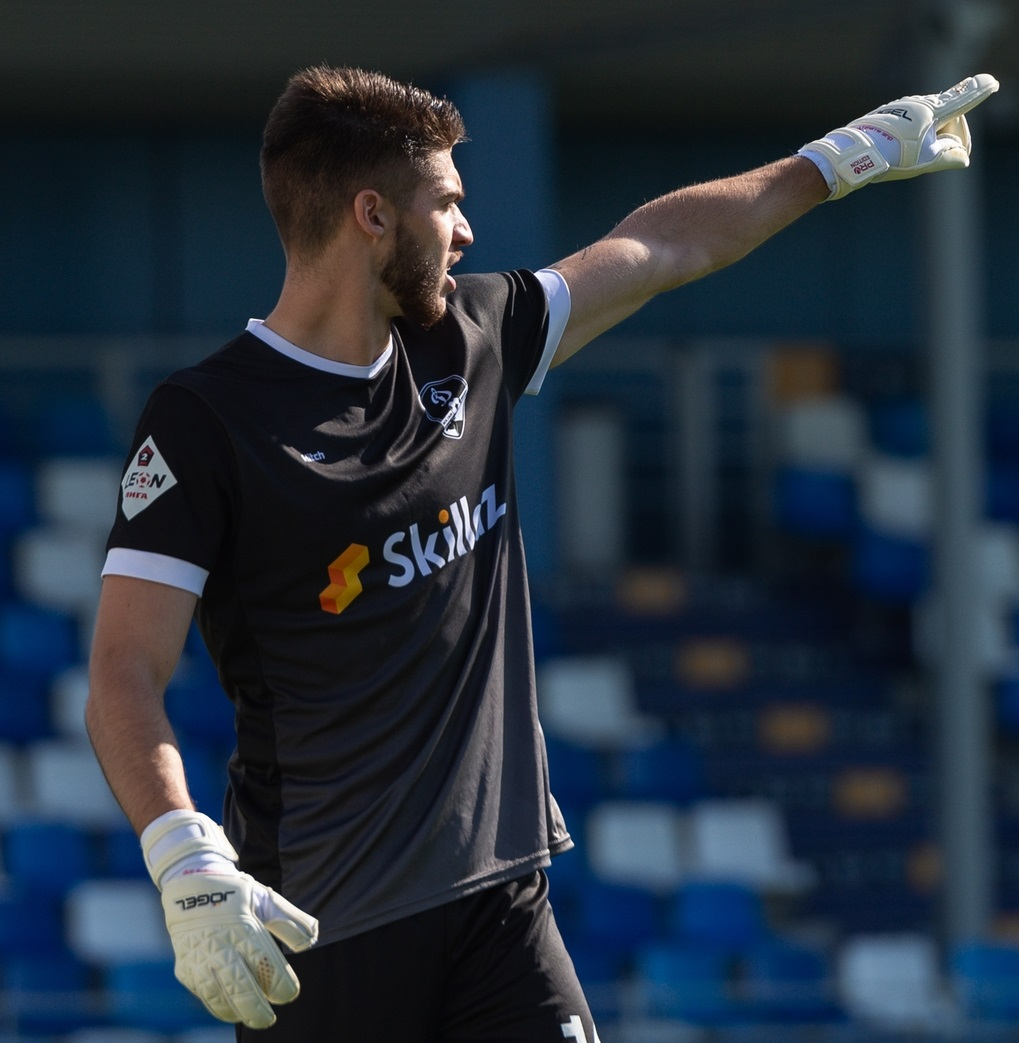
- Bobrov with Dynamo Vologda in 2023

Personal information
- Full name: Semyon Glebovich Bobrov
- Date of birth: 12 April 2003 (age 23)
- Place of birth: Moscow, Russia
- Height: 1.87 m (6 ft 2 in)
- Position: Goalkeeper

Team information
- Current team: Saturn Ramenskoye
- Number: 16

Youth career
- –2015: Molniya Moscow
- 2015: Rodina Moscow
- 2016: Krylia Sovetov Moscow
- 2016: SSh-2 Krasnogvardeysky District St. Petersburg
- 2017–2019: DYuSSh Kolomyagi Saint Petersburg
- 2020: Zvezda Saint Petersburg

Senior career*
Years	Team	Apps	(Gls)
2021	FC Vista Gelendzhik (amateur)		
2021–2022	Krasava	4	(0)
2022	FShM Moscow (amateur)		
2023	Osipovichi	3	(0)
2023–2024	Dynamo Vologda	31	(0)
2024	Tekstilshchik Ivanovo	1	(0)
2025	Kolomna	27	(0)
2026–	Saturn Ramenskoye	16	(0)
- * Club domestic league appearances and goals as of 31 October 2026

Semyon Glebovich Bobrov (Russian: Семён Глебович Бобров; born 12 April 2003) is a Russian football player who plays for Saturn Ramenskoye.

== Club career ==
He made his debut in the Russian Professional Football League for Krasava on 21 August 2021 in a game against Zenit-2 Saint Petersburg.

He made his debut in the Belarusian First League for Osipovichi on 14 April 2023 in a game against Lokomotiv Gomel.
