= Valeri Zhabko =

Russian footballer (1967–2026)

Personal information
- Full name: Valeri Nikolayevich Zhabko
- Date of birth: 18 August 1967
- Place of birth: Vichuga, Ivanovo Oblast, Russian SFSR, USSR
- Date of death: 5 May 2026 (aged 58)
- Height: 1.80 m (5 ft 11 in)
- Position: Defender

Youth career
- Barrikady Volgograd

Senior career*
Years	Team	Apps	(Gls)
1985–1991	Torpedo Volzhsky	106	(0)
1991	Rotor Volgograd	23	(0)
1992–1993	Torpedo Volzhsky	70	(4)
1994–1995	Tekstilshchik Kamyshin	50	(1)
1996–1998	Metallurg Lipetsk	91	(3)
1998–1999	Sokol Saratov	41	(0)
2000	Saturn Ramenskoye	22	(0)
2001–2002	Metallurg Lipetsk	67	(2)
2003–2004	Tekstilshchik Kamyshin	36	(0)
2008	FC UOR Volgograd		

Managerial career
- 2005: FC Spartak-MZhK Ryazan (assistant)
- 2008: FC UOR Volgograd (director)
- * Club domestic league appearances and goals

Valeri Nikolayevich Zhabko (Russian: Валерий Николаевич Жабко; 18 August 1967 – 5 May 2026) was a Russian professional footballer who played as a defender.

== Biography ==
Zhabko made his professional debut in the Soviet Second League in 1985 for Torpedo Volzhsky. He played three games in the UEFA Cup 1994–95 for Tekstilshchik Kamyshin.

Zhabko died on 5 May 2026, at the age of 58.
