= Kovernino =

Rural localities in Russia

Kovernino (Russian: Ковернино) is the name of several inhabited localities in Nizhny Novgorod Oblast, Russia.

Urban localities

- Kovernino, Koverninsky District, Nizhny Novgorod Oblast, a work settlement in Koverninsky District of Nizhny Novgorod Oblast

Rural localities

- Kovernino, Sokolsky District, Nizhny Novgorod Oblast, a village in Loyminsky Selsoviet of Sokolsky District of Nizhny Novgorod Oblast
