= Vitali Yakovlev =

Russian footballer

Personal information
- Full name: Vitali Borisovich Yakovlev
- Date of birth: 13 June 1985 (age 41)
- Place of birth: Obninsk, Kaluga Oblast, Russian SFSR
- Height: 1.84 m (6 ft 0 in)
- Position: Goalkeeper

Team information
- Current team: FC Kvant Obninsk
- Number: 16

Youth career
- FC Kvant Obninsk

Senior career*
Years	Team	Apps	(Gls)
2002–2003	FC Obninsk (amateur)		
2003–2004	FC Vityaz-2 Podolsk		
2005	FC Zenit-2 St. Petersburg	24	(0)
2006	FC Metallurg-Kuzbass Novokuznetsk	4	(0)
2006	FC Saturn Yegoryevsk	12	(0)
2008	FC Zenit-2 St. Petersburg	18	(0)
2009	FC Baltika Kaliningrad	1	(0)
2010–2012	FC Metallurg-Oskol Stary Oskol	59	(0)
2012–2017	FC Ryazan	120	(0)
2017–2018	FC Kvant Obninsk (amateur)		
2018–	FC Kvant Obninsk	162	(0)

International career
2004	Russia U21	1	(0)
- * Club domestic league appearances and goals as of 31 October 2026

Vitali Borisovich Yakovlev (Russian: Виталий Борисович Яковлев; born 13 June 1985) is a Russian professional football player who plays for FC Kvant Obninsk.

== Club career ==
He made his Russian Football National League debut for FC Baltika Kaliningrad on 19 September 2009 in a game against FC Luch-Energiya Vladivostok.
