= Lev Berezner =

Russian footballer (born 1970)

Personal information
- Full name: Lev Aleksandrovich Berezner
- Date of birth: 6 June 1970 (age 56)
- Place of birth: Obninsk, Russian SFSR
- Height: 1.78 m (5 ft 10 in)
- Positions: Midfielder; striker

Team information
- Current team: Kvant Obninsk (director)

Senior career*
Years	Team	Apps	(Gls)
1987–1990	Dynamo-2 Moscow	100	(16)
1991	Dinamo Sukhumi	40	(7)
1992	Bukovyna Chernivtsi	5	(1)
1992–1999	Chernomorets Novorossiysk	197	(56)

Managerial career
- 2024–: Kvant Obninsk (director)
- * Club domestic league appearances and goals

Lev Aleksandrovich Berezner (Russian: Лев Александрович Березнер; born 6 June 1970) is a Russian professional football official and a former player. He is the director of Kvant Obninsk.

== Club career ==
He played for the main squad of Dynamo Moscow in the USSR Federation Cup.
