= Minayev =

Minayev or Minaev is a Russian male surname, its feminine counterpart is Minayeva or Minaeva. It may refer to

- Aleksandr Minayev (disambiguation), several people
- Dmitry Minayev (1835—1889), Russian poet, satirist, journalist, translator and literary critic
- Ivan Minayev (1840–1890), the first Russian Indologist
- Maria Minaeva (born 2005), Russian artistic gymnast
- Roman Minayev (born 1997), Russian footballer
- Sergey Minaev (born 1975), Russian writer and TV presenter
- Yevgeny Minayev (1933–1993), Russian weightlifter
- Irina Osipova (later Minayeva, born 1981), Russian basketball player
