= Lyapkin =

Lyapkin (Russian: Ляпкин) is a Russian masculine surname, its feminine counterpart is Lyapkina. Notable people with the surname include:

- Dmitriy Lyapkin (born 1976), Kazakh football defender
- Yuri Lyapkin (1945–2026), Russian ice hockey player
