= Pavel Tarasov =

Russian footballer

Personal information
- Full name: Pavel Yuryevich Tarasov
- Date of birth: 19 January 1985 (age 41)
- Height: 1.96 m (6 ft 5 in)
- Position: Goalkeeper

Senior career*
Years	Team	Apps	(Gls)
2001–2004	FC Lada Togliatti	1	(0)
2003–2005	FC Lada-2 Togliatti		
2006	FC Tekstilshchik Kamyshin	8	(0)
2007–2009	FC Rotor Volgograd	20	(0)
2009	FC Torpedo Moscow (amateur)		
2010–2015	FC Nosta Novotroitsk	59	(0)
- * Club domestic league appearances and goals

Pavel Yuryevich Tarasov (Russian: Павел Юрьевич Тарасов; born 19 January 1985) is a former Russian professional football player.

== Club career ==
He played in the Russian Football National League for FC Lada Togliatti in 2003.
