= Russian Second League =

- Country: Russia
- Confederation: UEFA
- Divisions: 2
- Number of clubs: Division A – Gold Group: 10; Silver Group: 10; Division B – Group 1: 17; Group 2: 16; Group 3: 15; Group 4: 14; Total: 79
- Level on pyramid: 3–4
- Promotion to: First League
- Relegation to: Third Division
- Website: 2fnl.com
- Current: 2026–27 Division A 2026 Division B

Previous logo, 2021

The Russian Second League (Russian: Первенство России II дивизиона ФНЛ), formerly the Russian Professional Football League, are both the third (Division A) and fourth level (Division B) of Russian professional football.

== History ==
In 1998–2010, it was run by the Professional Football League. The 2011–12 season was run by the Department of Professional Football of the Russian Football Union (Russian: Департамент профессионального футбола Российского футбольного союза (ДПФ РФС), Departament professional'nogo futbola Rossijskogo futbol'nogo soyuza [DPF RFS]). From 2013 to 2021 season the league was again run by the Professional Football League and the name Second Division was no longer used, the league was just called PFL. Before the 2021–22 season, the league was merged organizationally with the second-tier First League and renamed to FNL2. Before the 2022–23 season, its short name was changed again, to a historical name "Russian Second League", even though the league's full title ("Second Division of the Football National League") remained the same.

The Second League was geographically divided into 4 zones: 1 (ex-South - Southern European Russia), 2 (ex-West - Western European Russia and Eastern Siberia), 3 (ex-Centre - Northern and Eastern European Russia and Sakhalin), 4 (ex-Ural-Povolzhye - Southern Urals and Western Siberia). The number of clubs in each zone varied between years. In the 2020–21 season, there were 64 clubs in the division.

The winners of each zone were automatically promoted to the Russian First League (known before 2011 as the First Division and from 2011 to 2022 as Russian Football National League). The bottom finishers of each zone lost professional status and were relegated to the Russian Amateur Football League. The teams typically could avoid relegation as long as they still have necessary financing to stay in the FNL2. Each club plays its opponents twice home and away.

For the 2023–24 season, the league was reorganized once again and split into two tiers - third-tier Russian Second League Division A and fourth-tier Russian Second League Division B.

Division A consists of two groups of 10 teams each - Gold Group and Silver Group. In the first stage of the season (summer/autumn), each team in the Gold and Silver groups plays each other team in the same group twice, home-and-away, for 18 games in total for each team.

For the second stage of the season (spring/summer), Groups are re-constituted. Gold Group now includes the top 6 first-stage Gold Group teams and top 4 first-stage Silver Group teams. Silver Group includes bottom 4 first-stage Gold Group teams, 5th and 6th-placed first-stage Silver Group teams and four winners of the Division B groups. Bottom 2 first-stage Silver Group teams are relegated to Division B. 7th and 8th first-stage Silver Group teams play in relegation play-offs against the previous season's bottom two second-stage Silver Group teams, with the losers of the play-offs relegated to Division B and the winners remaining in Division A Silver Group for the second stage. The teams in re-constituted groups play each other twice more for 18 more games. Top 2 Gold Group teams at the end of the season are promoted to the Russian First League for the next season. The 3rd-placed Gold Group team plays in promotion play-offs (two games, home-and-away) against the team that finishes first in the Gold Group in the first stage of the season (or second-placed first-stage team if the first-place first-stage team finishes in the top 2 or the bottom 4 in the second stage, or third-placed first-stage team if the second-place first-stage team also finishes in the top 2 or the bottom 4 in the second stage), the winner of those play-offs is also promoted to the Russian First League. The bottom four teams in the Gold Group at the end of the season are moved to Silver Group for the next season, and the top four teams in the Silver Group are moved to the Gold Group.

Division B consists of four groups, mostly based on geography (1, 2, 3, 4). The winners of groups 1, 2, 3 and 4 are promoted to the Division A Silver Group for the spring/summer part of the Division A season. Division B switched to the spring-to-autumn cycle, the season is played from March to November.

The rotation between Division A and Division B happens in the winter, as described above.

== Current teams ==
=== Second League A ===
Team	Home city	Stadium	Capacity	Head coach
FK Dinamo Bryansk	Bryansk	Stadion Dinamo	10,100	(Russia) Konstantin Sineokov
FK Irtysh Omsk	Omsk	Stadion Krasnaya Zvezda	4,655	(Russia) Maksim Mishatkin
FK Khimik Dzerzhinsk	Dzerzhinsk	Stadion Khimik	5,266	(Russia) Sergey Perednya
FK Krasnodar II	Krasnodar	Stadion Akademii FK Krasnodar	4,371	(Russia) Ilya Valiev
FK Mashuk-KMV Pyatigorsk	Pyatigorsk	Central'nyj Stadion Mashuk	10,365	(Russia) Artur Sadirov
FK Metallurg Lipetsk	Lipetsk	Stadion Metallurg	14,940	(Belarus) Maksim Romashchenko
FK Murom	Murom	Stadion Park 50	3,000	(Belarus) Aleksandr Kulchiy
FK Rodina Moskva II	Moscow	Stadion Rodina	10,033	(Russia) Filipp Sokolinskiy
FK Torpedo Miass	Miass	Stadion Trud	5,000	(Russia) Vladimir Fedorov
FK Volga Ulyanovsk	Ulyanovsk	Stadion Trud	15,000	(Russia) Mikhail Belov

=== Second League B Group 1 ===
Team	Home city	Stadium	Capacity	Head coach
Alaniya Vladikavkaz II	Grozny	Republican Spartak Stadium	32,364	(Russia) Aslan Zaseev
Angusht Nazran	Nazran	Stadion Central'nyj im. Rashida Ausheva	3,200	(Russia) Umar Markhiev
FK Astrakhan	Astrakhan	Stadion imeni Kolosova	5,000	(Russia) Artem Kulikov
FC Biolog-Novokubansk	Progress	Stadion Biolog	2,300	-
Dinamo Dagestan	Makhachkala	-	-	(Russia) Artem Kashuba
Dinamo GTS Stavropol	Stavropol	Stadion Dinamo	15,982	(Russia) Ashamaz Shakov
Druzhba Maikop	Maykop	Adygeyskiy Respublikanskiy Stadion Druzhba	15,000	(Russia) Sergey Miroshnichenko
Forte Taganrog	Taganrog	Forte Arena Taganrog	16,500	(Russia) Eduard Sarkisov
Kuban Kholding	Pavlovskaya	Stadion Urozhay	3,500	(Russia) Dmitri Fomin
Legion Makhachkala	Makhachkala	Stadion Dinamo	16,100	(Russia) Akhmad Magomedkamilov
Nark Cherkessk	Cherkessk	-	-	(Russia) Arslan Khalimbekov
FK Pobeda	Khasavyurt	-	-	-
FK Rostov II	Rostov-na-Donu	-	-	(Russia) Aleksandr Abroskin
FC Rubin Yalta	Yalta	Stadion Avanhard	4,000	(Russia) Aleksey Grachev
FC Sevastopol	Sevastopol	SKS Arena	5,864	(Russia) Stanislav Gudzikevich
Stroitel Kamensk-Shakhtinskiy	Kamensk-Shakhtinskiy	-	-	(Russia) Aleksey Korobchenko
Spartak Nal'chik	Nal'chik	Stadion Spartak	14,384	(Russia) Timur Bitokov

=== Second League B Group 2 ===
Team	Home city	Stadium	Capacity	Head coach
Luki-Energiya Velikiye Luki	Velikiye Luki	Stadion Ekspress	3,500	(Russia) Sergey Osadchuk
Baltika BFU imeni Immanuila Kanta	Kaliningrad	-	-	(Russia) Anver Koneev
Chertanovo Moskva	Moscow	Arena Chertanovo	4,000	(Russia) Sergey Chikishev
Dinamo Moskva II	Moscow	UTB Novogorsk-Dynamo	1,500	(Russia) Pavel Alpatov
Dinamo St. Petersburg	St. Petersburg	Malaya Sportivnaya Arena	3,018	(Russia) Aleksandr Fomichev
Dinamo Vologda	Vologda	Stadion Dinamo	8,460	(Russia) Rudolf Chesalov
FK Irkutsk	Irkutsk	-	-	(Russia) Konstantin Dzutsev
FK Rodina-m	Moscow	-	-	(Russia) Aleskandr Pavlenko
Saturn Moskovskaya Oblast	Ramenskoe	Leon Arena	16,726	(Belarus) Vladimir Korytko
FK Spartak Moskva II	Moscow	Futbol'noe pole 4 Akademiya Spartak im. F. Cherenkova	4,000	(Russia) Dmitri Kombarov
Torpedo Vladimir	Vladimir	Stadion Torpedo	19,700	(Russia) Denis Evsikov
FK Tver	Tver	Stadion Junost'	650	(Russia) Vladislav Ternavskiy
FK Yenisey Krasnoyarsk	Krasnoyarsk	Central'nyj Stadion	32,500	(Russia) Aleskandr Kishinevskiy
Zenit St. Petersburg II	St. Petersburg	Malaya Sportivnaya Arena	3,018	(Russia) Andrey Pocheptsov
Znamya Truda Orekhovo-Zuyevo	Orekhovo-Zuyevo	Sportkompleks Znamja Truda	5,500	(Russia) Vyacheslav Lugovkin
Zvezda St. Petersburg	St. Petersburg	Stadion Nova Arena	2,000	-

=== Second League B Group 3 ===
Team	Home city	Stadium	Capacity	Head coach
Arsenal-2 Tula	Kosaya Gora	DYuSSh Arsenal Stadium	1,000	(Russia) Andrey Kozlov
Dynamo Vladivostok	Vladivostok	-	-	(Russia) Mikhail Salnikov
Spartak Tambov	Tambov	Stadion Spartak	8,000	(Russia) Mikhail Pilipko
FK Khimki II	Khimki	Stadion Novye Khimki	3,066	(Serbia) Branimir Petrović
FK Kolomna	Kolomna	Stadion Trud	3,200	(Russia) Aleksandr Kuranov
Kompozit Pavlovsky Posad	Pavlovsky Posad	-	-	(Russia) Igor Rudoy
Kosmos Dolgoprudny	Dolgoprudny	-	-	(Russia) Andrey Proshin
Kvant Obninsk	Obninsk	Stadion Trud	4,000	(Russia) Oleg Morozov
FC Oryol	Oryol	Stadion Central'nyj im. V.I. Lenina	15,292	(Russia) Evgeni Polyakov
FK Ryazan	Ryazan	Central'nyj Sportivn'yj Kompleks	20,000	(Russia) Yuri Kuleshov
Sakhalin Sakhalinsk	Yuzhno-Sakhalinsk	Stadion Spartak	4,200	(Russia) Yuri Drozdov
Salyut Belgorod	Belgorod	Stadion Salyut Belgorod	11,456	(Russia) Viktor Navochenko
SKA-Khabarovsk II	Khabarovsk	Stadion imeni V.I. Lenina zapasnoe pole	1,000	(Russia) Marat Khoziev
Strogino Moskva	Moscow	Stadion Rublevo	2,000	(Russia) Sergey Zagidullin
Zenit Penza	Penza	Stadion Pervomayskiy	4,000	-

=== Second League B Group 4 ===
Team	Home city	Stadium	Capacity	Head coach
Dinamo Barnaul	Barnaul	Stadion Dinamo	16,000	(Russia) Vitali Vikhlyanov
Akron Togliatti II	Togliatti	-	-	(Russia) Renat Miftakhov
Amkar Perm	Perm	Stadion Zvezda	17,000	(Russia) Andrey Blazhko
Dinamo Kirov	Novovyatsk	Stadion Rossiya	3,000	(Russia) Viktor Bulatov
Krylya Sovetov Samara II	Samara	Stadion Metallurg zapasnoe pole	1,500	(Russia) Dmitri Shukov
Lada Tolyatti	Tolyatti	Stadion Torpedo	18,500	(Russia) Vladimir Shcherbak
Nosta Novotroitsk	Novotroitsk	Stadion Metallurg	6,060	(Russia) Maksim Gerasin
FK Orenburg II	Rostoshi	Stadion Gazovik	10,046	(Russia) Maksim Groshev
Rubin Kazan II	Kazan	Stadion Rubin	10,000	(Turkey) Gökdeniz Karadeniz
Sokol Kazan	Kazan	-	-	(Russia) Sergey Ryzhikov
Ural-D Ekaterinburg	Ekaterinburg	Stadion Central'nyj	27,000	(Russia) Aleksandr Dantsev
Uralets TS Nizhnyi Tagil	Nizhnyi Tagil	Stadion Uralets	10,000	(Russia) Igor Bakhtin
Volna Nizhegorodskaya Oblast	Kovernino	-	-	(Russia) Oleg Makeev
RTsPF NN Elektrika	Nizhny Novgorod	-	-	(Russia) Valeri Burlachenko

== Winners ==
Season	Zone 4	Zone 1	Zone 2	Zone 3	Zone 5		Zone 6	
1992	FC Baltika Kaliningrad	FC Erzu Grozny	FC Avtodor-Olaf Vladikavkaz	FC Spartak-d Moscow	FC Neftekhimik Nizhnekamsk		FC Zarya Leninsk-Kuznetsky	
Season	Zone 5	Zone 1	Zone 2	Zone 4	Zone 3	Zone 6	Zone 7	
1993	FC Vympel Rybinsk	FC Anzhi Makhachkala	FC Salyut Belgorod	FC Torpedo-MKB Mytishchi	FC Torpedo Arzamas	FC Devon Oktyabrsky	FC Angara Angarsk	
Season	West			Centre			Siberia	Far East
1994	FC Fakel Voronezh			FC Torpedo Volzhsky			FC Chkalovets Novosibirsk	FC Dynamo Yakutsk
Season	West			Centre			East	
1995	FC Spartak Nalchik			FC Gazovik-Gazprom Izhevsk			FC Metallurg Krasnoyarsk	
1996	FC Metallurg Lipetsk			FC Lada Dimitrovgrad			FC Irtysh Omsk	
1997	FC Arsenal Tula			FC Rubin Kazan			FC Tom Tomsk	
Season	West	South		Centre	Povolzhye (Volga region)	Ural	East	
1998	FC Torpedo-ZIL Moscow	FC Volgar-Gazprom Astrakhan		FC Spartak-Orekhovo Orekhovo-Zuyevo	FC Torpedo-Viktoriya Nizhny Novgorod	FC Amkar Perm	FC Metallurg Novokuznetsk	
1999	FC Avtomobilist Noginsk	FC Kuban Krasnodar		FC Spartak-Chukotka Moscow	FC Lada Togliatti	FC Nosta Novotroitsk	FC Metallurg Novokuznetsk	
2000	FC Severstal Cherepovets	FC Kuban Krasnodar		FC Khimki	FC Svetotekhnika Saransk	FC Neftekhimik Nizhnekamsk	FC Metallurg Novokuznetsk	
2001	FC Dynamo-SPb Saint Petersburg	FC SKA Rostov-on-Don		FC Metallurg Lipetsk	FC Svetotekhnika Saransk	FC Uralmash Yekaterinburg	FC SKA-Energia Khabarovsk	
2002	FC Baltika Kaliningrad	FC Terek Grozny		FC Metallurg Lipetsk	FC Svetotekhnika Saransk	FC Uralmash Yekaterinburg	FC Metallurg-Zapsib Novokuznetsk	
Season	West	South		Centre	Ural–Povolzhye (Idel-Ural)		East	
2003	FC Arsenal Tula	FC Dynamo Makhachkala		FC Oryol	FC KAMAZ Naberezhnye Chelny		FC Luch-Energia Vladivostok	
2004	FC Torpedo Vladimir	FC Dynamo Stavropol		FC Fakel Voronezh	FC Ural Yekaterinburg		FC Chkalovets-1936 Novosibirsk	
2005	FC Baltika Kaliningrad	FC Angusht Nazran		FC Salyut-Energia Belgorod	FC Sodovik Sterlitamak		FC Metallurg Krasnoyarsk	
2006	FC Tekstilshchik-Telekom Ivanovo	FC Spartak Vladikavkaz		FC Spartak-MZhK Ryazan	FC Nosta Novotroitsk		FC Zvezda Irkutsk	
2007	FC Sportakademklub Moscow	FC Chernomorets Novorossiysk		FC Vityaz Podolsk	FC Volga Ulyanovsk		FC Dynamo Barnaul	
2008	FC MVD Rossii Moscow	FC Volgar-Gazprom-2 Astrakhan		FC Metallurg Lipetsk	FC Volga Nizhny Novgorod		FC Chita	
2009	FC Dynamo Saint Petersburg	FC Zhemchuzhina-Sochi		FC Avangard Kursk	FC Mordovia Saransk		FC Irtysh Omsk	
2010	FC Torpedo Vladimir	FC Chernomorets Novorossiysk		FC Torpedo Moscow	FC Gazovik Orenburg		FC Metallurg-Yenisey Krasnoyarsk	
2011–12	FC Petrotrest Saint Petersburg	FC Rotor Volgograd		FC Salyut Belgorod	FC Neftekhimik Nizhnekamsk		FC Metallurg-Kuzbass Novokuznetsk	
2012–13	FC Khimik Dzerzhinsk	FC Angusht Nazran		FC Arsenal Tula	FC Gazovik Orenburg		FC Luch-Energiya Vladivostok	
2013–14	FC Tosno	FC Volgar Astrakhan		FC Sokol Saratov	FC Tyumen		FC Sakhalin Yuzhno-Sakhalinsk	
2014–15	FC Spartak-2 Moscow	FC Torpedo Armavir		FC Fakel Voronezh	FC KAMAZ Naberezhnye Chelny		FC Baikal Irkutsk	
2015–16	FC Khimki	PFC Spartak Nalchik		FC Tambov	FC Neftekhimik Nizhnekamsk		FC Smena Komsomolsk-na-Amure	
2016–17	FC Dynamo Saint Petersburg	FC Rotor Volgograd		FC Avangard Kursk	FC Olimpiyets Nizhny Novgorod		FC Chita	
2017–18	FC Chertanovo Moscow	FC Armavir		FC Ararat Moscow	FC Mordovia Saransk		FC Sakhalin Yuzhno-Sakhalinsk	
2018–19	FC Tekstilshchik Ivanovo	FC Chayka Peschanokopskoye		FC Torpedo Moscow	FC Neftekhimik Nizhnekamsk		FC Sakhalin Yuzhno-Sakhalinsk	
2019–20	FC Veles Moscow	FC Volgar Astrakhan		FC Dynamo Bryansk	FC Akron Tolyatti		FC Irtysh Omsk	
Season	Group 2	Group 1		Group 3	Group 4			
2020–21	FC Olimp-Dolgoprudny	FC Kuban Krasnodar		FC Metallurg Lipetsk	FC KAMAZ Naberezhnye Chelny			
2021–22	FC Shinnik Yaroslavl	FC Dynamo Makhachkala		FC Rodina Moscow	FC Volga Ulyanovsk			
2022–23	FC Leningradets	FC Chernomorets Novorossiysk		FC Sokol Saratov	FC Tyumen			
