= Vyacheslav Kuznetsov =

Vyacheslav or Viacheslav Kuznetsov may refer to:

- Vyacheslav Kuznetsov (politician) (born 1947), Belarusian politician who served as Acting Chairman of the Supreme Soviet in 1994
- Vyacheslav Kuznetsov (cyclist) (born 1989), Russian cyclist
- Vyacheslav Kuznetsov (composer) (born 1955), Belarusian classical music composer
- Vyacheslav Kuznetsov (footballer) (born 1962), Russian football player (senior career 1979–1997) and coach (since 2003)
