= Koverninsky =

Koverninsky (masculine), Koverninskaya (feminine), or Koverninskoye (neuter) may refer to:

- Koverninsky District, a district of Nizhny Novgorod Oblast, Russia
- Koverninskoye, a rural locality (a village) in Nizhny Novgorod Oblast, Russia
