= Obninsk Meteorological tower =

Mast in Obninks, Russia

Coordinates: 55°06′42″N 36°35′54″E

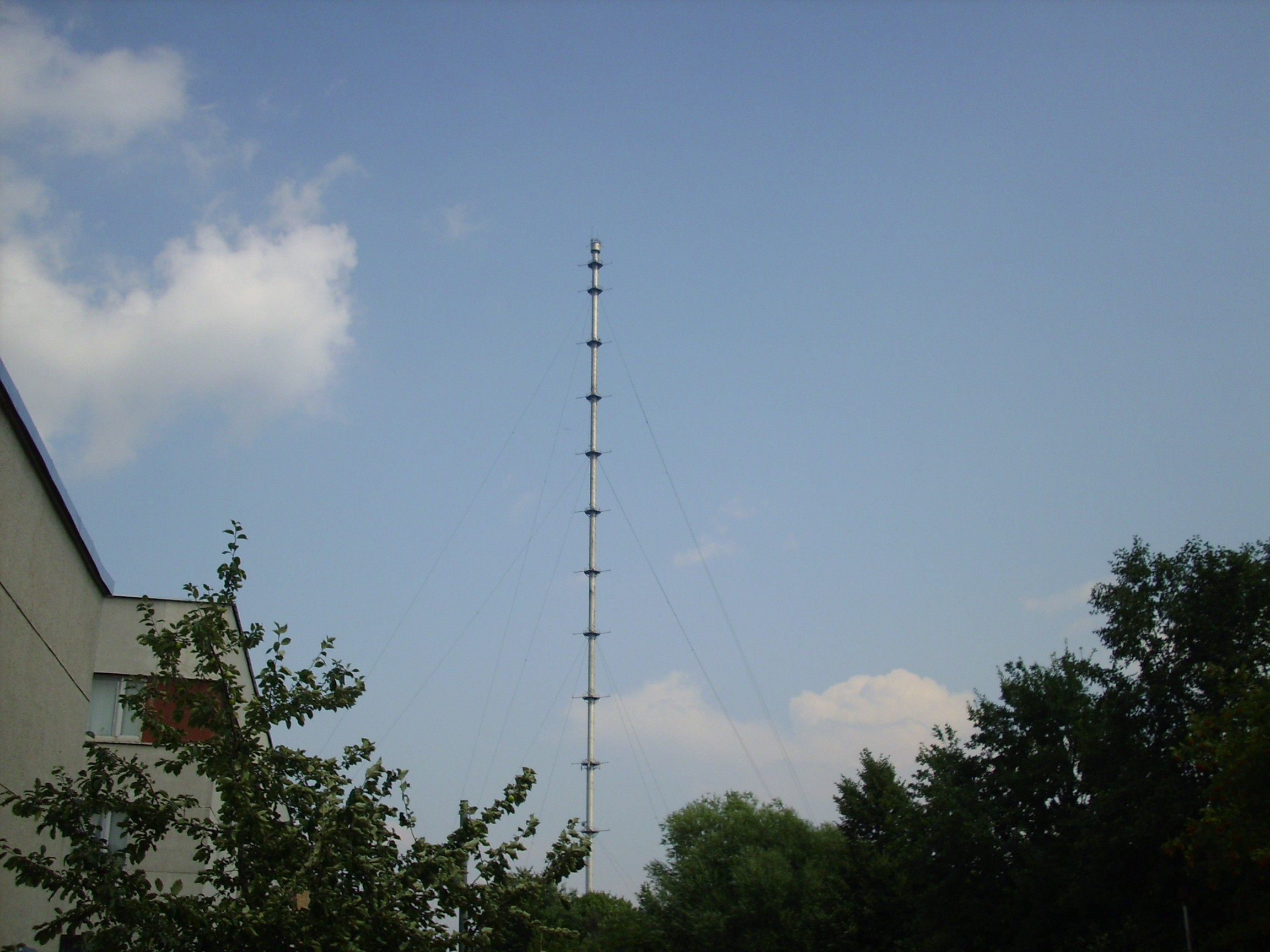
Meteorological tower

Obninsk Meteorological Tower is a 310 meter tall silver-grey guyed steel tube mast at Obninsk, Russia. Obninsk Meteorological Tower was built in 1958 and is equipped with multiple platforms on different heights, on which devices for measuring radioactivity and for meteorological science are installed.

Obninsk Meteorological Tower is the official landmark of the Russian science town Obninsk.

== See also ==
- List of masts
