= Andrei Prokhorov =

Russian footballer

Personal information
- Full name: Andrei Vladimirovich Prokhorov
- Date of birth: 28 September 1965 (age 61)
- Height: 1.75 m (5 ft 9 in)
- Position: Defender

Senior career*
Years	Team	Apps	(Gls)
1983–1984	FC Dynamo Leningrad	23	(0)
1987–1988	FC Dynamo Leningrad	54	(1)
1989	FC Kirovets Leningrad	0	(0)
1989–1990	FC Spartak Tambov	69	(1)
1991–1994	FC Tekstilshchik Kamyshin	104	(1)
1995	FC Lada Togliatti	38	(0)
1996–1998	FC Fakel Voronezh	77	(3)
- * Club domestic league appearances and goals

Andrei Vladimirovich Prokhorov (Russian: Андрей Владимирович Прохоров; born 28 September 1965) is a former Russian professional footballer.

== Club career ==
He made his professional debut in the Soviet Second League in 1983 for FC Dynamo Leningrad. He played one game in the UEFA Cup 1994–95 for FC Tekstilshchik Kamyshin.
