= Vladimir Filippov (footballer) =

Russian footballer and coach

Personal information
- Full name: Vladimir Nikolayevich Filippov
- Date of birth: 5 May 1968 (age 58)
- Place of birth: Kuybyshev, Russian SFSR
- Height: 1.86 m (6 ft 1 in)
- Positions: Defender; forward; midfielder

Team information
- Current team: PFC Krylia Sovetov Samara (U-19 asst coach)

Youth career
- Voskhod Kuybyshev

Senior career*
Years	Team	Apps	(Gls)
1985–1986	FC Krylia Sovetov Kuybyshev	2	(0)
1987	PFC CSKA Moscow	0	(0)
1988	PFC CSKA-2 Moscow	29	(1)
1989–1993	FC Krylia Sovetov Samara	184	(41)
1994	FC Tekstilshchik Kamyshin	26	(3)
1995–1996	FC Lada Togliatti	60	(12)
1997	FC Energiya Kamyshin	24	(3)
1998–1999	FC Nosta Novotroitsk	57	(43)
2000–2001	FC Rubin Kazan	61	(19)
2002–2003	FC Uralan Elista	20	(1)

Managerial career
- 2003–2004: FC Lada-SOK Dimitrovgrad
- 2004: FC Lada-SOK Dimitrovgrad (assistant)
- 2015–2016: FC Krylia Sovetov Samara (academy)
- 2016–2017: FC Krylia Sovetov Samara (assistant)
- 2017–2018: FC Krylia Sovetov-2 Samara (assistant)
- 2020–2021: FC Krylia Sovetov-2 Samara (assistant)
- 2021–: PFC Krylia Sovetov Samara (U-19 assistant)
- * Club domestic league appearances and goals

Vladimir Nikolayevich Filippov (Russian: Владимир Николаевич Филиппов; born 5 May 1968) is a Russian professional football coach and a former player. He is an assistant coach with the Under-19 squad of PFC Krylia Sovetov Samara.

== Club career ==
He made his professional debut in the Soviet First League in 1985 for FC Krylia Sovetov Kuybyshev. He played 4 games and scored 2 goals in the UEFA Cup 1994–95 for FC Tekstilshchik Kamyshin. He played two games in 1987 for PFC CSKA Moscow in the Soviet Cup.
