= Andriy Vasylytchuk =

Ukrainian footballer (born 1965)

Personal information
- Full name: Andriy Mykolayovych Vasylytchuk
- Date of birth: 23 October 1965 (age 61)
- Place of birth: Lviv, Ukrainian SSR
- Height: 1.84 m (6 ft 1/2 in)
- Positions: Defender; midfielder

Senior career*
Years	Team	Apps	(Gls)
1989–1990	FC Spartak Oryol	54	(4)
1991–1992	FC Halychyna Drohobych	57	(2)
1992–1994	FC Nyva Ternopil	72	(0)
1995–1996	FC Karpaty Lviv	15	(1)
1996	FC Zhemchuzhina Sochi	5	(0)
1996	FC Energiya-Tekstilshchik Kamyshin	1	(0)

International career
1993–1994	Ukraine	4	(0)
- * Club domestic league appearances and goals

Andriy Mykolayovych Vasylytchuk (Ukrainian: Андрій Миколайович Василитчук; born 23 October 1965) is a Ukrainian retired professional footballer. He made his professional debut in the Soviet Second League in 1989 for FC Spartak Oryol.
