= Aleksandr Minayev =

Aleksandr Minayev may refer to:

- Aleksandr Minayev (footballer, born 1954) (1954–2018), Russian football player and coach
- Aleksandr Minayev (footballer, born 1958) (1958–2010), Russian football player and coach
