= Oleg Rozin =

Russian footballer

Personal information
- Full name: Oleg Yuryevich Rozin
- Date of birth: 5 July 1965 (age 61)
- Place of birth: Leningrad, Russian SFSR
- Height: 1.70 m (5 ft 7 in)
- Positions: Defender; midfielder

Youth career
- Smena Leningrad

Senior career*
Years	Team	Apps	(Gls)
1983–1985	FC Zenit Leningrad	0	(0)
1985	FC Dynamo Leningrad	26	(0)
1988	FC Dynamo Leningrad	30	(2)
1989	FC Dynamo Bryansk	28	(6)
1990–1994	FC Tekstilshchik Kamyshin	165	(10)
1995–1996	FC Lada Togliatti	42	(2)
1996	FC Energiya-Tekstilshchik Kamyshin	4	(0)
1997	FC Neftekhimik Nizhnekamsk	36	(1)
1998–1999	FC Spartak Bryansk	43	(8)
2000	FC Spartak Lukhovitsy	17	(3)
2000	FC Kolomna	20	(2)
2001	FC SKA St. Petersburg		
- * Club domestic league appearances and goals

Oleg Yuryevich Rozin (Russian: Олег Юрьевич Розин; born 5 July 1965) is a former Russian professional footballer.

== Club career ==
He made his professional debut in the Soviet Second League in 1985 for FC Dynamo Leningrad. He played 4 games in the UEFA Cup 1994–95 for FC Tekstilshchik Kamyshin.
