= Sergei Pimenov =

Russian footballer

Personal information
- Full name: Sergei Pavlovich Pimenov
- Date of birth: 3 June 1969 (age 57)
- Height: 1.79 m (5 ft 10 1/2 in)
- Positions: Midfielder; forward

Youth career
- FC Druzhba Yoshkar-Ola

Senior career*
Years	Team	Apps	(Gls)
1990–1991	FC Druzhba Yoshkar-Ola	71	(20)
1992	FC Fakel Voronezh	29	(3)
1993	FC Spartak Vladikavkaz	21	(1)
1994–1995	FC Tekstilshchik Kamyshin	34	(5)
1996	FC Metallurg Lipetsk	20	(3)
1997	FC CSK VVS-Kristall Smolensk	13	(0)
1998	FC Lokomotiv Liski	35	(2)
1999–2000	FC Volga Ulyanovsk	50	(3)
2001	FC Luch Vladivostok	19	(1)
- * Club domestic league appearances and goals

Sergei Pavlovich Pimenov (Russian: Серге́й Павлович Пименов; born 3 June 1969) is a former Russian professional footballer.

== Club career ==
He made his professional debut in the Soviet Second League in 1990 for FC Druzhba Yoshkar-Ola. He played 3 games in the UEFA Cup 1994–95 for FC Tekstilshchik Kamyshin.
