= Vyacheslav Kuznetsov (footballer) =

Russian footballer and coach

Personal information
- Full name: Vyacheslav Mikhailovich Kuznetsov
- Date of birth: 29 June 1962
- Date of death: 14 August 2011 (aged 49)
- Place of death: Kamyshin, Russia
- Height: 1.83 m (6 ft 0 in)
- Position: Midfielder

Senior career*
Years	Team	Apps	(Gls)
1979–1981	FC Rotor Volgograd		
1982	FC Torpedo Volzhsky		
1983	FC Rotor Volgograd	0	(0)
1986–1992	FC Tekstilshchik Kamyshin	155	(34)
1992–1993	FC Avangard Kamyshin	55	(19)
1994	FC Tekstilshchik Kamyshin	7	(0)
1995	FC Zvezda Gorodishche	35	(10)
1996	FC Avangard Kamyshin		
1997	FC Druzhba Yoshkar-Ola	12	(1)

Managerial career
- 2003–2006: FC Tekstilshchik Kamyshin (assistant)
- 2007: FC Tekstilshchik Kamyshin (administrator)
- 2008: FC Tekstilshchik Kamyshin
- * Club domestic league appearances and goals

Vyacheslav Mikhailovich Kuznetsov (Russian: Вячеслав Михайлович Кузнецов; 29 June 1962 – 14 August 2011) was a Russian professional football coach and a player.

== Club career ==
He made his professional debut in the Soviet Second League in 1979 for FC Rotor Volgograd. He played 1 game in the 1994–95 UEFA Cup for FC Tekstilshchik Kamyshin.
