= Yuri Gusakov =

Russian footballer, official, and administrator

Personal information
- Full name: Yuri Mikhailovich Gusakov
- Date of birth: 16 April 1969 (age 57)
- Place of birth: Moscow, Russian SFSR
- Height: 1.85 m (6 ft 1 in)
- Positions: Forward; midfielder

Team information
- Current team: FC Zenit St. Petersburg (administrator)

Senior career*
Years	Team	Apps	(Gls)
1988	PFC CSKA-2 Moscow	0	(0)
1989	FC Spartak Kostroma	26	(6)
1990	FC Geolog Tyumen	22	(1)
1991–1992	FC Zenit St. Petersburg	39	(7)
1993	FC Zenit-2 St. Petersburg	6	(5)
1993	Wormatia Worms	13	(1)
1994–1995	FC Tekstilshchik Kamyshin	11	(0)

Managerial career
- 1997–2001: FC Zenit St. Petersburg (administrator)
- 2002–2003: FC Zenit St. Petersburg (director)
- 2004: FC Metalurh Donetsk (administrator)
- 2005–: FC Zenit St. Petersburg (administrator)
- * Club domestic league appearances and goals

Yuri Mikhailovich Gusakov (Russian: Юрий Михайлович Гусаков; born 16 April 1969) is a Russian professional football official and a former player. He works as an administrator with FC Zenit St. Petersburg.

== Playing career ==
He made his professional debut in the Soviet Second League in 1989 for FC Spartak Kostroma. He played 1 game and scored 1 goal in the UEFA Cup 1994–95 for FC Tekstilshchik Kamyshin.
