= Sergei Polstyanov =

Russian footballer

Personal information
- Full name: Sergei Nikolayevich Polstyanov
- Date of birth: 12 April 1967 (age 59)
- Place of birth: Zolote Pole, Crimean Oblast, Ukrainian SSR
- Height: 1.74 m (5 ft 9 in)
- Position: Forward

Youth career
- FC Torpedo Volzhsky

Senior career*
Years	Team	Apps	(Gls)
1989–1991	FC Rotor Volgograd	82	(14)
1992	FC Nyva Ternopil	12	(3)
1992	SC Tavriya Simferopol	9	(1)
1993	FC Evis Mykolaiv	17	(12)
1993–1995	FC Tekstilshchik Kamyshin	35	(10)
1996–1998	FC Metallurg Lipetsk	104	(44)
1999	FC Kristall Smolensk	26	(3)
2000–2001	FC Tyumen	44	(19)

Managerial career
- 2002–2004: FC Tekstilshchik Kamyshin
- 2004–2006: FC Tekstilshchik Kamyshin
- 2007–2008: FC Moscow (academy)
- 2008–2010: FC Spartak Moscow (academy)
- 2011–2012: FC Lokomotiv Moscow (academy)
- 2013–2014: FC Lokomotiv-2 Moscow
- 2015–2016: FC Vityaz Podolsk
- * Club domestic league appearances and goals

Sergei Nikolayevich Polstyanov (Russian: Серге́й Николаевич Полстянов; born 12 April 1967) is a Russian professional football coach and a former player. He made his professional debut in the Soviet Top League in 1989 for FC Rotor Volgograd. He played 2 games and scored 1 goal in the UEFA Cup 1994–95 for FC Tekstilshchik Kamyshin.
