= Konstantin Pavlyuchenko =

Kazakhstani footballer

Personal information
- Full name: Konstantin Vladimirovich Pavlyuchenko
- Date of birth: 11 January 1971 (age 55)
- Place of birth: Jambyl, Kazakh SSR
- Height: 1.77 m (5 ft 9 1/2 in)
- Positions: Midfielder; forward

Senior career*
Years	Team	Apps	(Gls)
1989–1991	FC Khimik Dzhambul	78	(9)
1991	FC Kairat	14	(0)
1992	FC Nyva Ternopil	13	(2)
1992–1994	FC Dnipro Dnipropetrovsk	28	(1)
1994–1995	FC Lada Togliatti	31	(2)
1995	FC Tekstilshchik Kamyshin	10	(1)
1996	FC Lada Togliatti	9	(0)
1996–1997	FC Kryvbas Kryvyi Rih	25	(0)
1998	Navbahor Namangan	15	(3)
1999	FC Metalurh Novomoskovsk	8	(2)
1999–2000	MFC Mykolaiv	40	(5)
2001	Olimpiya FC AES Yuzhnoukrainsk	1	(0)
2001–2002	FC Elektrometalurh-NZF Nikopol	16	(6)
2002–2003	FC Zorya Luhansk	18	(2)
2003–2004	FC Elektrometalurh-NZF Nikopol	16	(1)

International career
1992	Kazakhstan	1	(0)
- * Club domestic league appearances and goals

Konstantin Vladimirovich Pavlyuchenko (Russian: Константин ВладимировичПавлюченко; Ukrainian: Костянтин Володимирович Павлюченко; born 11 January 1971) is a former Kazakhstani professional footballer who also holds Ukrainian citizenship.

== Club career ==
He made his professional debut in the Soviet Second League in 1989 for FC Khimik Dzhambul.

== Honours ==
- Ukrainian Premier League runner-up: 1993.
