= Aleksandr Minayev (footballer, born 1958) =

Russian footballer

Personal information
- Full name: Aleksandr Alekseyevich Minayev
- Date of birth: 20 August 1958
- Place of birth: Ignashino, Russian SFSR
- Date of death: 12 March 2010 (aged 51)
- Place of death: Voronezh, Russia
- Height: 1.78 m (5 ft 10 in)
- Positions: Defender; midfielder; forward

Youth career
- 1975: FC Lokomotiv Gorky

Senior career*
Years	Team	Apps	(Gls)
1976–1978	FC Volga Gorky	107	(22)
1979	FC Krylia Sovetov Kuybyshev	22	(0)
1980–1981	FC Torpedo Moscow	23	(0)
1981–1982	FC Volga Gorky	55	(25)
1983–1989	FC Fakel Voronezh	263	(67)
1990	FC Kotayk Abovian	16	(3)
1990	FC Fakel Voronezh	19	(0)
1991	Budućnost Valjevo	?	(?)
1991	FC Fakel Voronezh	11	(0)
1992–1995	FC Tekstilshchik Kamyshin	99	(0)
1996	FC Metallurg Lipetsk	23	(0)
1998	FC Fakel-2 Voronezh		

Managerial career
- 2000: FC Lokomotiv Liski
- 2004–2005: FC Fakel Voronezh (assistant)
- * Club domestic league appearances and goals

Aleksandr Alekseyevich Minayev (Russian: Александр Алексеевич Минаев; born 20 August 1958, died 12 March 2010) was a Russian professional football player and coach.

== Playing career ==
He made his professional debut in the Soviet Second League in 1976 for FC Volga Gorky. He played 4 games in the UEFA Cup 1994–95 for FC Tekstilshchik Kamyshin. Minayev played only for one club abroad, a season in Yugoslavia with Serbian side FK Budućnost Valjevo.

== Death ==
He died in March 2010 in Voronezh.
