= Rostoshi =

Rostoshi Ростоши
- Selo
- Location within Voronezh Oblast Location within Russia
- Coordinates: 51°35′N 40°55′E
- Country: Russia
- Region: Voronezh Oblast
- District: Ertilsky District
- Time zone: UTC+3:00

Rostoshi (Russian: Ростоши) is a rural locality (a selo) and the administrative center of Rostoshinskoye Rural Settlement, Ertilsky District, Voronezh Oblast, Russia. The population was 1,384 as of 2010. There are 22 streets.

== Geography ==
Rostoshi is located on the Tokay River, 32 km south of Ertil (the district's administrative centre) by road. Ertil is the nearest rural locality.
