= FC Kvant Obninsk =

Russian football club

- Full name: Football Club Kvant Obninsk
- Founded: 1962
- Ground: Trud
- Capacity: 4000
- Chairman: Lev Berezner
- Manager: Oleg Morozov
- League: Russian Second League, Division B, Group 3
- 2026: 16th
- Website: https://kvant.futbol/

FC Kvant Obninsk (Russian: ФК Квант Обнинск) is a Russian football team from Obninsk. It was founded in 1962 and played at amateur levels. It advanced to the third-tier Russian Second League for the first time ever for the 2018–19 season.

== Current squad ==
As of 11 September 2026, according to the Second League website.

Note: Flags indicate national team as defined under FIFA eligibility rules; some limited exceptions apply. Players may hold more than one non-FIFA nationality.

No.	Pos.	Nation	Player
1	GK	RUS	Nikita Poberezhny
2	DF	RUS	Miron Pogorelov
3	MF	RUS	Vikenty Shchipachyov
4	DF	RUS	Gordey Nefyodov
5	MF	RUS	Kirill Artyomenkov
6	DF	RUS	Yefim Zenkevich
8	MF	RUS	Daniil Lobanov
9	FW	RUS	Nikita Shcherby
10	FW	RUS	Aleksey Chaplygin
11	MF	RUS	Marat Volkov
12	MF	RUS	Musa Sayfutdinov
13	DF	RUS	Maksim Timchenko
14	FW	RUS	Vladislav Roskita

No.	Pos.	Nation	Player
15	MF	RUS	Anatoly Demidov
16	GK	RUS	Vitali Yakovlev
17	MF	RUS	Azamat Dzhumayev
18	MF	RUS	Pavel Makarenko
19	FW	RUS	Nikita Baranov
20	DF	RUS	Arseny Salenko
21	DF	RUS	Viktor Dragoy
22	DF	RUS	Nikita Gorunkov
23	DF	RUS	Artemy Medvedev
24	FW	RUS	Denis Tigunov
25	FW	RUS	Avdey Balaluyev
26	DF	RUS	Aleksandr Sirotkov
29	DF	RUS	Maksim Sofin
