= Vladislav Ternavsky =

Russian football coach and former player (born 1969)

Personal information
- Full name: Vladislav Mikhailovich Ternavsky
- Date of birth: 2 May 1969 (age 57)
- Place of birth: Kyiv, Ukrainian SSR, Soviet Union
- Height: 1.85 m (6 ft 1 in)
- Position: Defender

Senior career*
Years	Team	Apps	(Gls)
1986	Dynamo Kyiv (reserves)	?	(?)
1987	Dynamo Irpin	26	(0)
1989–1991	Dynamo Kyiv	0	(0)
1992	Dynamo-2 Kyiv	37	(7)
1993–1994	Nyva Ternopil	29	(6)
1994	Spartak Moscow	20	(0)
1995–1996	Chornomorets Odesa	32	(4)
1996	Energiya-Tekstilshchik Kamyshin	28	(0)
1997	Saturn Ramenskoye	12	(0)
1997–1998	Rostselmash Rostov-on-Don	16	(0)
1999	Dynamo Stavropol	13	(1)
1999	Shinnik Yaroslavl	2	(0)
2000	Volgar-Gazprom Astrakhan	21	(0)
2001	Lokomotiv Nizhny Novgorod	9	(0)
2002	Irtysh Pavlodar	13	(0)
Total		258	(18)

International career
1994–1996	Russia	7	(0)

Managerial career
- 2004: Zhemchuzhina Budyonnovsk (assistant)
- 2007–2008: Vityaz Podolsk (assistant)
- 2008–2009: Vityaz Podolsk (administrator)
- 2010: Vityaz Podolsk
- 2011–2013: Vityaz Podolsk (assistant)
- 2013–2015: Vityaz Podolsk
- 2015–2016: Yenisey Krasnoyarsk (assistant)
- 2017: Tobol (assistant)
- 2019: FC Prialit Reutov
- 2019: FC Khimik-Arsenal (assistant)
- 2019–2020: FC Arsenal Tula (U19 assistant)
- 2020: FC Arsenal Tula (U19)
- 2020–2021: FC Arsenal Tula (U19 assistant)
- 2021–2022: FC Arsenal Tula (U19)
- 2022–2024: FC Tver (assistant)
- 2023: FC Tver (caretaker)
- 2024: FC Tver
- * Club domestic league appearances and goals

Vladislav Mikhailovich Ternavsky (Russian: Владислав Михайлович Тернавский; born 2 May 1969) is a Ukrainian and Russian football coach and former player.

== Playing career ==
He earned 7 caps for Russia from 1994 to 1996, and played in the 1994 FIFA World Cup. The clubs he played for included FC Dynamo Kyiv, FC Spartak Moscow, FC Saturn Ramenskoe, FC Rostov and FC Shinnik Yaroslavl.

== Honours ==
- Russian Premier League champion: 1994.
- Ukrainian Premier League runner-up: 1995, 1996.
- Kazakhstan Premier League champion: 2002.
- Russian Cup winner: 1994.

== European club competitions ==
- European Cup 1991–92 with FC Dynamo Kyiv: 1 game.
- UEFA Champions League 1993–94 with FC Spartak Moscow: 4 games.
- UEFA Champions League 1994–95 with FC Spartak Moscow: 2 games.
