= Kovernino, Koverninsky District, Nizhny Novgorod Oblast =

Kovernino Ковернино
- Urban-type settlement
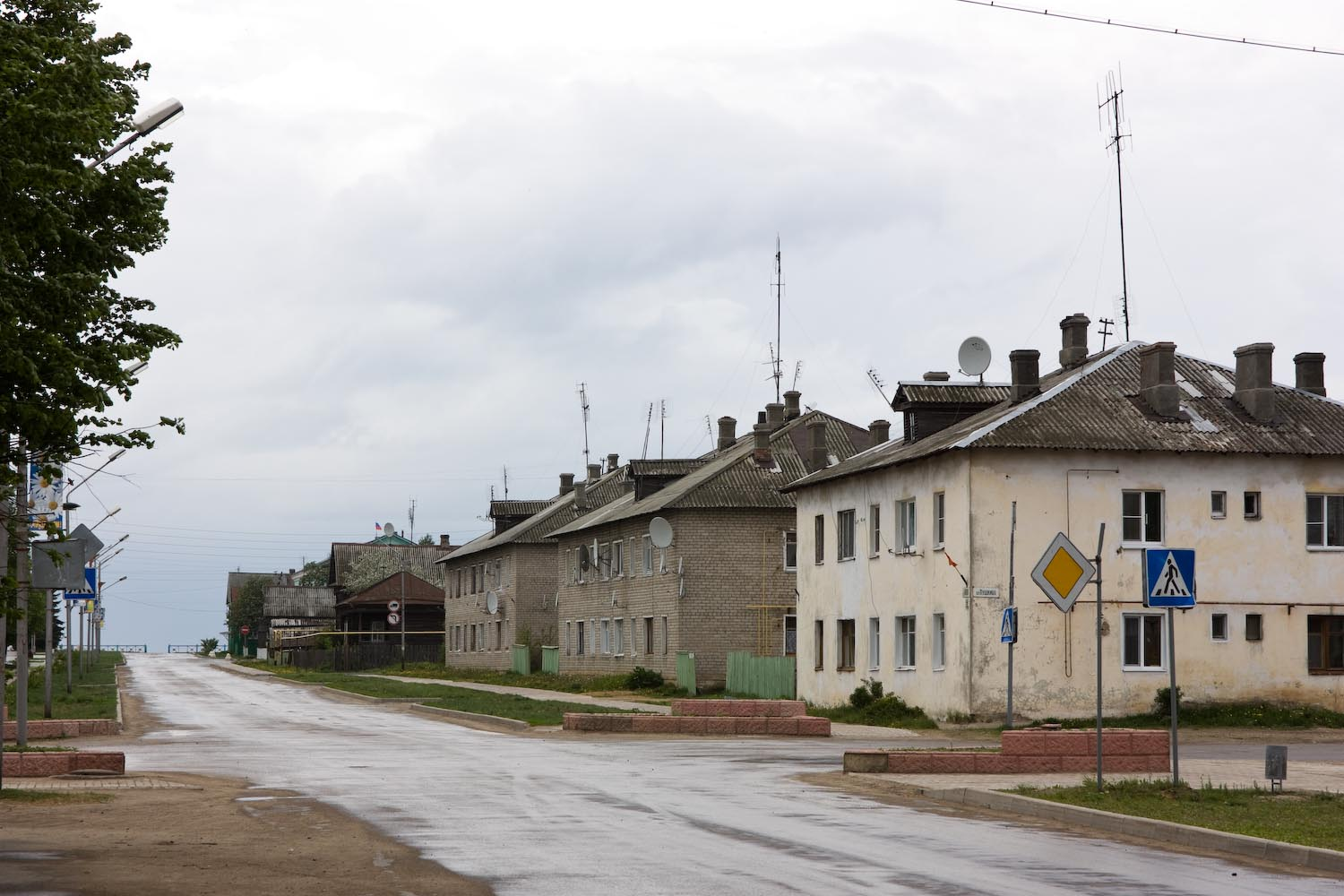

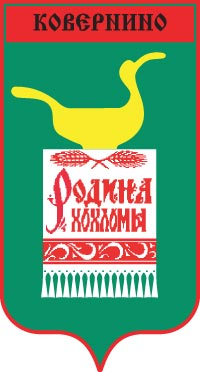
- Coat of arms
- Interactive map of Kovernino
- Location of Kovernino Kovernino (Nizhny Novgorod Oblast)
- Coordinates: 57.1253°N 43.8172°E
- Country: Russia
- Federal subject: Nizhny Novgorod Oblast
- Administrative district: Koverninsky District

Population (2010 Census)
  - Total: 6,892
  - Estimate (2025): 6,891 (−0%)
- Time zone: UTC+3 (MSK)
- Postal code: 606570
- OKTMO ID: 22634151051

Kovernino (Russian: Ковернино́) is an urban locality (an urban-type settlement) in Koverninsky District of Nizhny Novgorod Oblast, Russia. Population: 6,892 (2010 census); 6,875 (2002 census); 7,212 (1989 Soviet census).
