= Andriy Yudin =

Ukrainian footballer

Personal information
- Full name: Andriy Viktorovych Yudin
- Date of birth: 28 June 1967 (age 59)
- Place of birth: Krasnodar, Soviet Union
- Height: 1.74 m (5 ft 9 in)
- Positions: Defender; midfielder

Youth career
- DYuSSh-5 GorONO Krasnodar

Senior career*
Years	Team	Apps	(Gls)
1984–1985	Kuban Krasnodar	23	(6)
1986–1987	SKA Rostov-on-Don	38	(3)
1988	Kuban Krasnodar	42	(2)
1989–1993	Dnipro Dnipropetrovsk	99	(6)
1993–1994	Tekstilshchik Kamyshin	26	(0)
1994–1996	Dnipro Dnipropetrovsk	19	(1)
1996–1997	Fakel Voronezh	45	(8)
1997–1998	Kryvbas Kryvyi Rih	23	(0)
1998–2000	Torpedo Zaporizhzhia	17	(1)
2000–2002	Kuban Krasnodar	40	(0)
2003	Dynamo Krasnodar		

International career
1992	Ukraine	1	(0)

Managerial career
- 2004: Kuban Krasnodar (assistant)
- 2005–2006: Krasnodar-2000
- 2007: Kuban Krasnodar (reserves assistant)
- 2008–2009: Kuban Krasnodar (assistant)
- 2011–2012: Kuban Krasnodar (reserves)
- 2016–2017: Kuban-2 Krasnodar
- 2018–2019: Kuban Krasnodar
- 2019: Urozhay Krasnodar
- 2019–2020: Urozhay Krasnodar (assistant)
- 2021: Kuban-Holding Pavlovskaya
- 2022: TSK-Tavriya Simferopol
- * Club domestic league appearances and goals

Andriy Viktorovych Yudin (Ukrainian: Андрій Вікторович Юдін; Russian: Андрей Викторович Юдин; born 28 June 1967) is a Ukrainian professional football coach and a former player.

== Playing career ==
He made his professional debut in the Soviet First League in 1985 for FC Kuban Krasnodar.

== Honours ==
- Soviet Top League runner-up: 1989.
- Soviet Cup winner: 1989.
- USSR Federation Cup winner: 1989.
- USSR Federation Cup runner-up: 1990.
- Ukrainian Premier League runner-up: 1993.
- Ukrainian Premier League bronze: 1992, 1995, 1996.

== European club competitions ==
- European Cup 1989–90 with FC Dnipro Dnipropetrovsk: 6 games, 1 goal.
- UEFA Cup 1990–91 with FC Dnipro Dnipropetrovsk: 2 games.
- UEFA Cup 1994–95 with FC Tekstilshchik Kamyshin: 3 games.
