= Dmytro Tyapushkin =

Russian footballer (born 1964)

Dmitry Tyapushkin
Personal information
- Full name: Dmitry Albertovych Tyapushkin
- Date of birth: 6 November 1964 (age 61)
- Place of birth: Volsk, Russian SFSR, Soviet Union
- Height: 1.95 m (6 ft 5 in)
- Position: Goalkeeper

Youth career
- Energiya Krasnoyarsk

Senior career*
Years	Team	Apps	(Gls)
1983	Energiya Krasnoyarsk		
1984	Avtomobilist Krasnoyarsk	7	(0)
1987	CSKA Moscow	0	(0)
1988	Metalist Kharkiv	0	(0)
1988–1990	Desna Chernihiv	116	(0)
1991–1994	Nyva Ternopil	96	(0)
1994–1995	Spartak Moscow	22	(0)
1996	CSKA Moscow	30	(0)
1997–1998	Dynamo Moscow	52	(0)
1999–2000	Sokol Saratov	7	(0)
Total		330	(0)

International career
1994–1995	Ukraine	7	(0)

Managerial career
- 2000–2004: Sokol Saratov (GK coach)
- 2005: CSKA Moscow (academy)
- 2005–2008: CSKA Moscow (reserves GK coach)
- 2009: MVD Rossii Moscow (GK coach)
- 2010: Salyut Belgorod (GK coach)
- 2011–2012: Krylya Sovetov Samara (GK coach)
- 2013–2017: Mordovia Saransk (GK coach)
- 2018–2019: SKA-Khabarovsk (GK coach)
- 2019–2020: Alania Vladikavkaz (GK coach)
- 2020: Olimp Khimki (GK coach)
- 2020–2021: Olimp-Dolgoprudny (GK coach)
- 2021: Rotor Volgograd (GK coach)
- * Club domestic league appearances and goals

Dmitry Albertovych Tyapushkin (Ukrainian: Дмитро Альбертович Тяпушкін, Russian: Дмитрий Альбертович Тяпушкин; born 6 November 1964) is a Russian professional football coach and a former Russian-Ukrainian player who also represented Ukraine national football team.

== Club career ==
Native of Russian Lower Volga region, Tyapushkin played for few Russian clubs out of Krasnoyarsk (including Yenisey) in the Soviet Union before 1988 moving to Ukraine where he played until 1994 in lower leagues and met the fall of the Soviet Union. Following the establishment of new Ukrainian national top division in 1992 Tyapushkin entered it with its FC Nyva Ternopil from the Soviet Second League.

He made his debut in the Russian Premier League in 1994 for FC Spartak Moscow. Since then his professional football career including as a player or a coach was associated only with Russia. In 2000 Tyapushkin retired from playing career and continued as a goalkeeping coach in FC Sokol Saratov.

His coaching career included such clubs like FC Sokol Saratov, PFC CSKA Moscow, FC MVD Rossii Moscow, FC Salyut Belgorod, FC Krylya Sovetov Samara, FC Mordovia Saransk, and FC SKA-Khabarovsk where he acted as a goalkeeping coach. During his stint in CSKA Moscow, Tyapushkin only dealt with the club's academy and junior squad.

== Honours ==
- Russian Premier League champion: 1994.
- Russian Premier League bronze: 1995, 1997.
- Russian Cup finalist: 1999.

== European club competitions ==
- 1994–95 UEFA Champions League with FC Spartak Moscow: 6 games.
- 1996–97 UEFA Cup with PFC CSKA Moscow: 1 game.
- 1997 UEFA Intertoto Cup with FC Dynamo Moscow: 6 games.
- 1998–99 UEFA Cup with FC Dynamo Moscow: 5 games.

== International career ==
Playing in Ukraine since 1988 at international level Tyapushkin represented the newly formed official Ukraine national football team for which he recorded seven played games. He made his debut on 15 March 1994 in a game against Israel national football team.

Tyapushkin became the first main goalkeeper of Ukraine national football team in its first qualification cycle UEFA Euro 1996 in which he played the first 4 of 10 games with one game tied and three lost. Following a home loss to the Italy national football team, he was replaced with Oleh Suslov.

Tyapushkin replaced the first Ukrainian goalkeeping duet from Kharkiv Ihor Kutyepov and Oleksandr Pomazun who were the first international goalies for Ukraine.
