= Konstantin Sineokov =

Russian footballer and coach

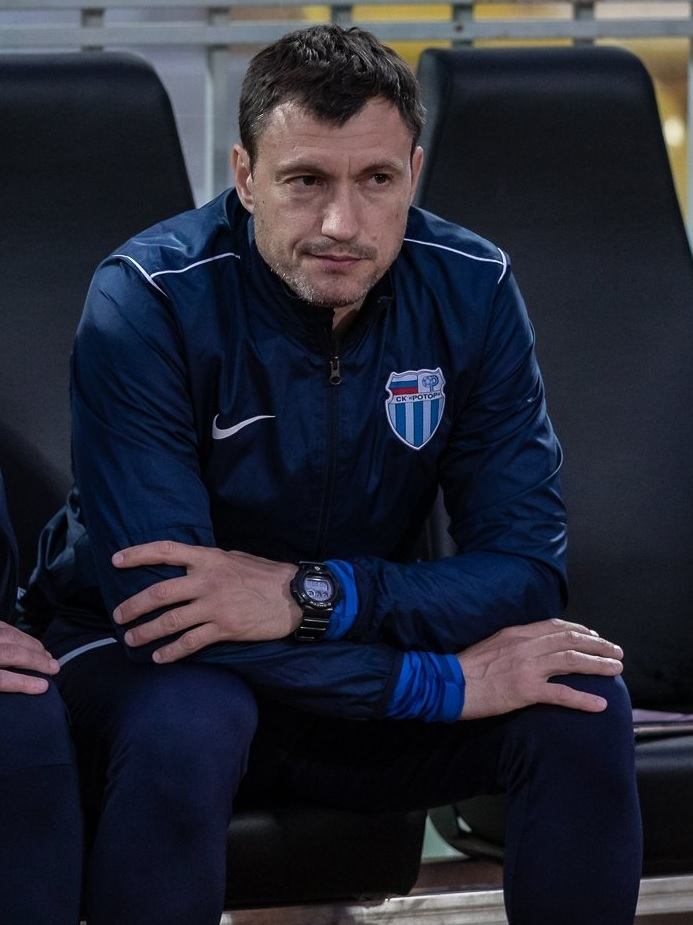
- Sineokov with Rotor Volgograd in 2022

Personal information
- Full name: Konstantin Nikolayevich Sineokov
- Date of birth: 30 May 1978 (age 48)
- Place of birth: Gofitskoye, Stavropol Krai, Russian SFSR
- Height: 1.81 m (5 ft 11 in)
- Positions: Defender; midfielder

Senior career*
Years	Team	Apps	(Gls)
1996–1997	Dynamo-d Stavropol	50	(7)
1997–1998	Dynamo Stavropol	8	(0)
2000	Dynamo Stavropol	16	(0)
2001–2002	Terek Grozny	33	(0)
2003	Mashuk-KMV Pyatigorsk	12	(1)
2003–2004	Spartak Nalchik	23	(0)
2005–2007	Spartak-MZhK Ryazan	74	(10)
2007–2008	Rotor Volgograd	21	(0)
2008	Nizhny Novgorod	18	(1)
2009	Stavropol	31	(1)
2010	Dynamo Stavropol	11	(0)
2010	Neftekhimik Nizhnekamsk	11	(0)
2011	Mostovik-Primorye Ussuriysk	7	(0)
2012–2013	Spartak Gelendzhik		

Managerial career
- 2014–2015: Krasnodar-2 (assistant)
- 2016: Krasnodar-2 (assistant)
- 2018–2019: Krasnodar-2 (assistant)
- 2019: Krasnodar-3 (assistant)
- 2019–2021: Krasnodar-2 (assistant)
- 2021: Akron Tolyatti (assistant)
- 2022: Rotor Volgograd (assistant)
- 2022: Fakel Voronezh (assistant)
- 2022–2023: Veles Moscow (assistant)
- 2023: Alania Vladikavkaz (assistant)
- 2024: Dynamo Bryansk
- 2025: Chernomorets Novorossiysk (assistant)
- 2025–2026: Fakel Voronezh (assistant)
- * Club domestic league appearances and goals

Konstantin Nikolayevich Sineokov (Russian: Константин Николаевич Синеоков; born 30 May 1978) is a Russian professional football coach and a former player.

== Club career ==
Sineokov made his Russian Football National League debut for Dynamo Stavropol on 26 September 1997 in a game against Torpedo Volzhsky. He played 5 seasons in the First League.
