= Dmitry Lyapkin =

Kazakhstani footballer

Dmitriy Lyapkin
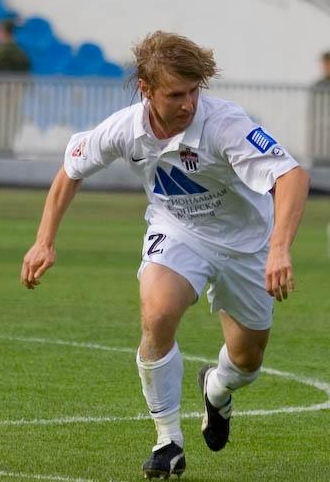

Personal information
- Full name: Dmitriy Vladimirovich Lyapkin
- Date of birth: 16 September 1976 (age 50)
- Place of birth: Shymkent, Kazakh SSR
- Height: 1.70 m (5 ft 7 in)
- Position: Defender

Youth career
- PFC CSKA Moscow

Senior career*
Years	Team	Apps	(Gls)
1992–1995	PFC CSKA-d Moscow	78	(6)
1996–1997	FC Energia Kamyshin	49	(0)
1997	FC Uralan Elista	3	(0)
1998–2002	FC Saturn Ramenskoye	128	(4)
2003	FC Sokol-Saratov	29	(1)
2004	FC Khimki	31	(1)
2005	FC Zhenis Astana	21	(0)
2006–2007	FC Khimki	48	(3)
2008	FC Baltika Kaliningrad	15	(0)
2009–2010	FC Lokomotiv-2 Moscow	41	(4)

International career
2004–2007	Kazakhstan	15	(0)

Managerial career
- 2011–2012: FC Lokomotiv-2 Moscow (coach youth team)
- * Club domestic league appearances and goals

Dmitriy Vladimirovich Lyapkin (Russian: Дмитрий Владимирович Ляпкин; born 16 September 1976) is a Kazakh former football defender.

Lyapkin has made 15 appearances for the Kazakhstan national football team since 2004.
