= Koverninsky District =

Koverninsky District Ковернинский район (Russian)
- District
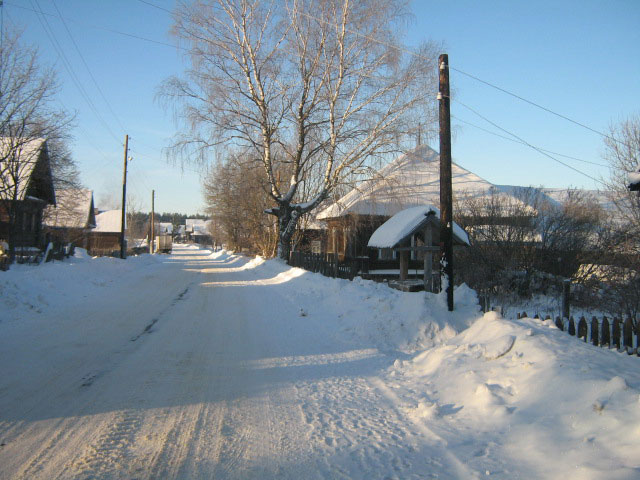
- The village of Talitsy in Koverninsky District

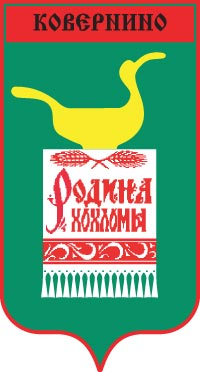
- Coat of arms
- Location of Koverninsky District in Nizhny Novgorod Oblast
- Coordinates: 57°08′N 43°49′E
- Country: Russia
- Federal subject: Nizhny Novgorod Oblast
- Established: 1929
- Administrative center: Kovernino

Area
  - Total: 2,339.8 km^{2} (903.4 sq mi)

Population (2010 Census)
  - Total: 19,951
  - Density: 8.5268/km^{2} (22.084/sq mi)
  - Urban: 34.5%
  - Rural: 65.5%

Administrative structure
  - Administrative divisions: 1 Work settlements, 5 Selsoviets
  - Inhabited localities: 1 urban-type settlements, 183 rural localities

Municipal structure
  - Municipally incorporated as: Koverninsky Municipal District
  - Municipal divisions: 1 urban settlements, 5 rural settlements
- Time zone: UTC+3 (MSK)
- OKTMO ID: 22634000
- Website: http://www.kovernino.ru

Population of Koverninsky District
- 2010 Census: 19,951
- 2002 Census: 21,404
- 1989 Census: 24,063
- 1979 Census: 24,897

Koverninsky District (Russian: Коверни́нский райо́н) is an administrative district (raion), one of the forty in Nizhny Novgorod Oblast, Russia. Municipally, it is incorporated as Koverninsky Municipal District. It is located in the northwest of the oblast. The area of the district is 2,339.8 square kilometers (903.4 sq mi). Its administrative center is the urban locality (a work settlement) of Kovernino. As of the 2010 Census, the total population of the district was 19,951, with the population of Kovernino accounting for 34.5% of that number.

== History ==
The district was established in 1929.
