= FC Avangard Kamyshin =

- Full name: Football Club Avangard Kamyshin
- Founded: 1958
- Dissolved: 1997
- 1996: Amateur Football League, Zone South, 1st

FC Avangard Kamyshin (Russian: ФК «Авангард» Камышин) was a Russian football team from Kamyshin. It played professionally from 1991 to 1994, including one season (1993) in the second-highest Russian First Division.
