= FC Saturn Ramenskoye =

Russian football club

Saturn Ramenskoye
- Full name: State-Owned Enterprise of the Moscow Region; Football Club Saturn Moscow Region; Russian: Государственное учреждение Московской области Футбольный клуб "Сатурн" Московская область
- Nicknames: The Aliens; The Humanoids
- Founded: 1946; 80 years ago
- Ground: Saturn Stadium, Ramenskoye
- Capacity: 14,685
- Chairman: Aleksandr Litvinenko
- Manager: Vacant
- League: Russian Second League, Division B, Group 3
- 2026: 6th
- Website: www.saturn-fc.ru
Home colours	Away colours

FC Saturn Ramenskoye (Russian: ФК Сатурн Ра́менское) is a Russian professional football club, based in the town of Ramenskoye in Moscow Oblast. It is also sometimes referred to as FC Saturn Moscow Region (Russian: ФК Сатурн Московской области, romanized: FK Saturn Moskovskaya Oblast).

== History ==
The club was founded in 1946. Although the club is based in Ramenskoye, it represents all of the Moscow Oblast. Due to huge debts it was dissolved in January 2011, but was recreated on the base of FC Saturn-2 Moscow Region. It returned to the Russian Professional Football League in the 2013–14 season. Before the 2015–16 season, the club didn't receive the professional license and moved back to amateur levels. It returned to the third-tier once again for the 2016–17 season.

It was previously called Krylya Sovetov (1946–1957), Trud (1958–1959), Saturn (from 1960 to 2002, from 2004 to 2023 and from 2025) and Saturn-REN TV (February 2002 to January 2004). In July 2023, the club was renamed to "Leon Saturn" due to a sponsorship deal with bookmaker Leon. The sponsorship deal ended at the end of 2024, with the club reverting to their historical name. In 2006 the club beat the record of drawn matches played in the Russian Premier League during one season - 16 times.

== League and cup history ==
Saturn's reserve squad played professionally as FC Saturn-2 Ramenskoye in the Russian Second Division in 1999 and 2000. Since 2004 exists a separate farm club — Saturn Yegoryevsk, since 2008 called Saturn-2, played in the Russian Second Division to 2012.

== Current squad ==
As of 12 September 2026

Note: Flags indicate national team as defined under FIFA eligibility rules; some limited exceptions apply. Players may hold more than one non-FIFA nationality.

No.	Pos.	Nation	Player
1	GK	RUS	Timofey Minkin
2	DF	RUS	Daniil Nikolayev
3	DF	RUS	Dmitry Biryukov (on loan from Veles Moscow)
5	DF	RUS	Vildan Yermilov
7	FW	RUS	Dmitry Bushuyev
8	MF	RUS	Maksim Sedov
10	FW	RUS	Artur Maksimchuk
13	MF	RUS	Vladislav Tyurin
16	GK	RUS	Semyon Bobrov
19	MF	RUS	Matvey Myagkov
20	DF	RUS	Dmitri Pivovarov
21	DF	RUS	Orts Tsechoyev
22	DF	RUS	German Utkin
28	FW	RUS	Ilya Molteninov

No.	Pos.	Nation	Player
32	GK	RUS	Valery Matveyenkov
33	DF	RUS	Daniil Dyomin
35	GK	RUS	Maksim Kuleshov
44	DF	RUS	Nikolay Genchu
46	DF	RUS	Aleksei Sukharev
50	FW	RUS	Dmitry Koverov
55	MF	RUS	Artyom Teterkin
67	FW	RUS	Nikita Zernov
74	MF	RUS	Nikita Kupriyanov
77	MF	RUS	Nikita Getman
81	MF	RUS	Vladislav Vilgelm
88	DF	RUS	Valery Chupin
89	DF	RUS	Artyom Luttsev
97	MF	RUS	Vladimir Litvinenko

== Supporters ==
The football club Saturn Ramenskoye supporters movement was born in the second part of the 1980s when the team started playing on the professional level. The organised group of fans at that time consisted of not more than 20 people. The new age for FCSR supportive movement is connected with the year 1995. The famous local supporter Andrey Egorishev had begun to unite fans of Saturn. It is believed that the team played in black and blue colors because of him. In 1996 Saturn had played in red and white colors.

The first union of FCSR fans – Dorf Menschen ("Village People") – was organised in January 1996. Because a large number of these groups became uncontrollable, it was decided to unite them. Many FCSR fans' nicknames are connected with the aliens' club name. The black and blue fans themselves mostly use the nickname Gumy (short form of Russian "гуманоид" – humanoid).

== Notable players ==
Players who had international caps for their respective countries. Players whose name is listed in bold represented their countries while playing for Saturn.

USSR/Russia

- (Soviet Union) Yuri Gavrilov
- (Soviet Union) (Commonwealth of Independent States) (Russia) Andrei Kanchelskis
- (Russia) Andrei Afanasyev
- (Russia) Nikita Bazhenov
- (Russia) **Maksim Buznikin**
- (Russia) **Pyotr Bystrov**
- (Russia) **Valeri Chizhov**
- (Russia) Vadim Evseev
- (Russia) (Ukraine) **Oleksandr Horshkov**
- (Russia) Aleksei Igonin
- (Russia) Andrei Karyaka
- (Russia) Valery Kechinov
- (Russia) Yevgeni Kharlachyov
- (Russia) Dmitri Kirichenko
- (Russia) Valeri Kleimyonov
- (Russia) Dmitri Loskov
- (Russia) Andrey Lunyov
- (Russia) **Viktor Onopko**
- (Russia) Roman Shirokov
- (Russia) Artyom Rebrov
- (Russia) Sergey Ryzhikov
- (Russia) Vladislav Ternavski
- (Russia) **Roman Vorobyov**
- (Russia) Valery Yesipov

Europe

- (Armenia) **Andrey Movsisyan**
- (Belarus) **Vladimir Korytko**
- (Belarus) Konstantin Kovalenko
- (Belarus) **Leonid Kovel**
- (Bosnia and Herzegovina) Samir Duro
- (Bosnia and Herzegovina) **Samir Muratović**
- (Bosnia and Herzegovina) **Omer Joldić**
- (Bosnia and Herzegovina) Marko Topić
- (Czech Republic) **Antonín Kinský**
- (Finland) **Alexei Eremenko**
- (Finland) Boris Rotenberg
- (Georgia (country)) **Gogita Gogua**
- (Kazakhstan) Dmitriy Lyapkin
- (Lithuania) **Edgaras Česnauskis**
- (Lithuania) **Rolandas Džiaukštas**
- (Moldova) **Radu Rebeja**
- (Moldova) **Serghei Rogaciov**
- (Moldova) **Oleg Shishkin**
- (Moldova) **Adrian Sosnovschi**
- (Montenegro) **Simon Vukčević**
- (Serbia) Dušan Petković
- (Slovakia) **Ján Ďurica**
- (Slovakia) **Branislav Fodrek**
- (Slovakia) **Martin Jakubko**
- (Slovakia) **Kamil Kopúnek**
- (Slovakia) Branislav Obžera
- (Slovakia) **Peter Petráš**
- (Ukraine) Andriy Husin
- (Ukraine) Yevhen Levchenko
- (Ukraine) Dmytro Parfenov
- (Ukraine) Oleksandr Pomazun
- (Ukraine) **Vyacheslav Sviderskiy**

Central America

- (Costa Rica) **Winston Parks**

South America

- (Argentina) Pablo Horacio Guiñazu
- (Argentina) Daniel Montenegro
- (Paraguay) Fredy Bareiro
- (Peru) **Martín Hidalgo**
- (Uruguay) **Javier Delgado**

Africa

- (Cameroon) Benoît Angbwa
- (Ghana) **Prince Koranteng Amoako**
- (Ghana) **Baffour Gyan**
- (Ghana) **Illiasu Shilla**
- (Nigeria) **Solomon Okoronkwo**

Asia

- (Tajikistan) **Sergei Piskaryov**
- (Tajikistan) **Akhmed Yengurazov**
- (Tajikistan) **Farkhod Vasiev**
- (Uzbekistan) **Pavel Solomin**

== Club records ==
=== Most games ===
Country	Player	Number of games
(Czech Republic)	Antonin Kinsky	186
(Russia)	Aleksei Igonin	147
(Russia)	Pyotr Nemov	114
(Moldova)	Serghei Rogaciov	114
(Russia)	Andrey Karyaka	112
(Russia)	Alexey Medvedev	110
(Russia)	Dmitry Kirichenko	103
(Russia)	Ruslan Nakhushev	97
(Russia)	Alexey Ivanov	96
(Russia)	Valery Chizhov	96
