= Obninsk =

City in Kaluga Oblast, Russia

Obninsk Обнинск
- City
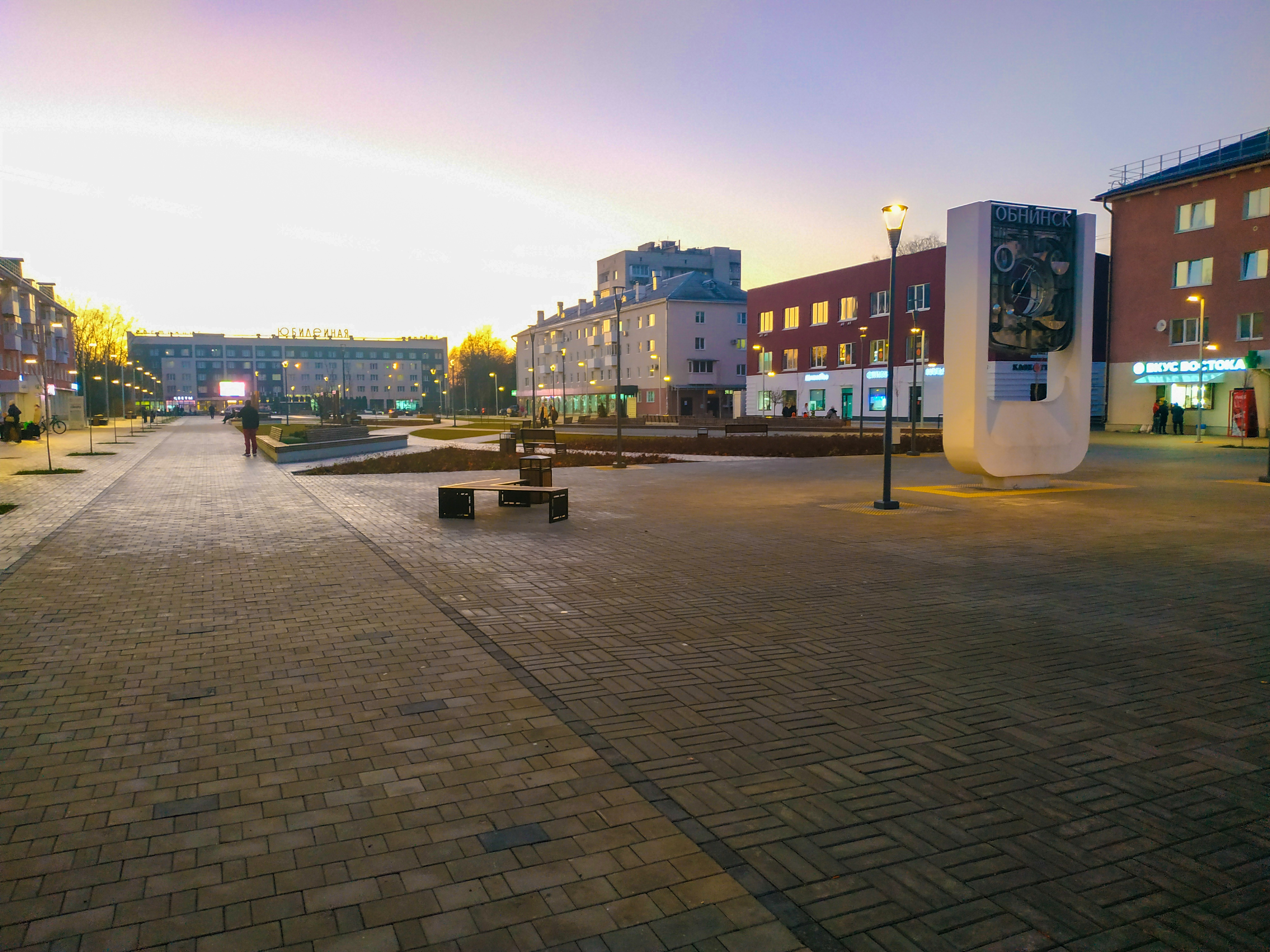
- Obninsk, Leypunsky street

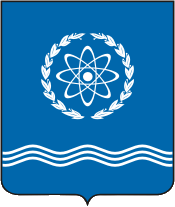
- Flag Coat of arms
- Interactive map of Obninsk
- Location of Obninsk Obninsk (Kaluga Oblast)
- Coordinates: 55°05′35″N 36°36′38″E
- Country: Russia
- Federal subject: Kaluga Oblast
- Founded: 1946
- City status since: 1956

Government
  - Head: Vyacheslav Lezhnin

Area
  - Total: 42.97 km^{2} (16.59 sq mi)
- Elevation: 175 m (574 ft)

Population (2010 Census)
  - Total: 104,739
  - Estimate (1 January 2024): 132,477 (+26.5%)
  - Rank: 153rd in 2010
  - Density: 2,437/km^{2} (6,313/sq mi)

Administrative status
  - Subordinated to: City of Obninsk
  - Capital of: City of Obninsk

Municipal status
  - Urban okrug: Obninsk Urban Okrug
  - Capital of: Obninsk Urban Okrug
- Time zone: UTC+3 (MSK)
- Postal code: 249030
- Dialing code: +7 48439
- OKTMO ID: 29715000001
- Website: www.admobninsk.ru

Obninsk (Russian: О́бнинск) is a city in Kaluga Oblast, Russia, located on the bank of the Protva River 100 kilometers (62 mi) southwest of Moscow and 80 kilometers (50 mi) northeast of Kaluga. Its population is 125,376 at the 2021 census.

== History ==
The history of Obninsk began in 1945 when the First Research Institute Laboratory "V", subsequently called the Institute of Physics and Power Engineering (IPPE) was founded. On June 27, 1954, Obninsk started operations of the world's first nuclear power plant to generate electricity for a power grid. The city was built next to the plant in order to support it. Scientists, engineers, construction workers, teachers and other professionals moved to Obninsk from all over the Soviet Union. Town status was granted to Obninsk on June 24, 1956. The name of the city is taken from Obninskoye, the train station in Moscow-Bryansk railroad, built in Tsarist times. Obninskoye and Obninsk were the frontline edges of the White/Red Armies in 1917–1924, also the 1812 War with France and the 1941-1942 Battle of Moscow Campaigns in World War II.

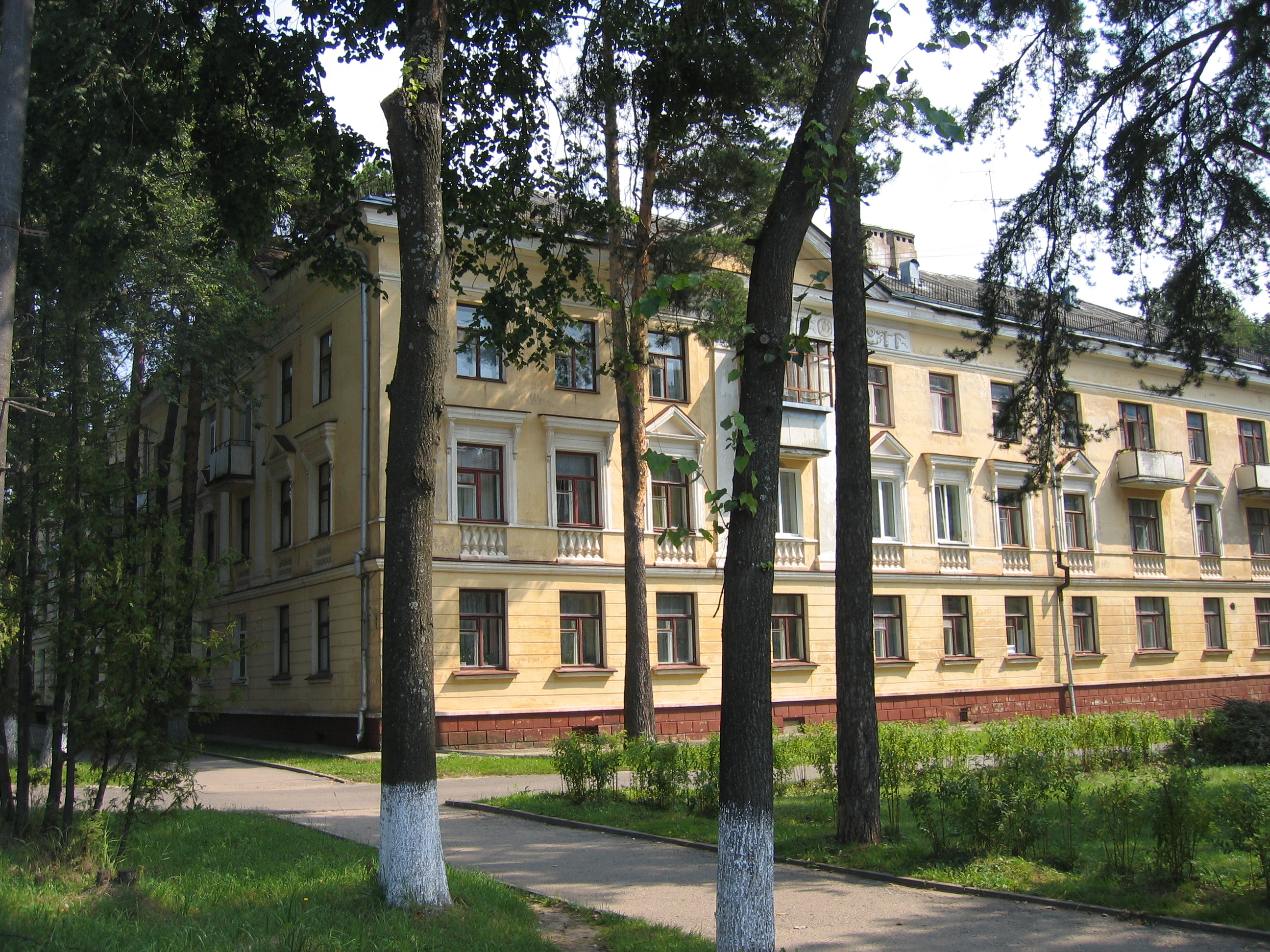
Old buildings, 1950s

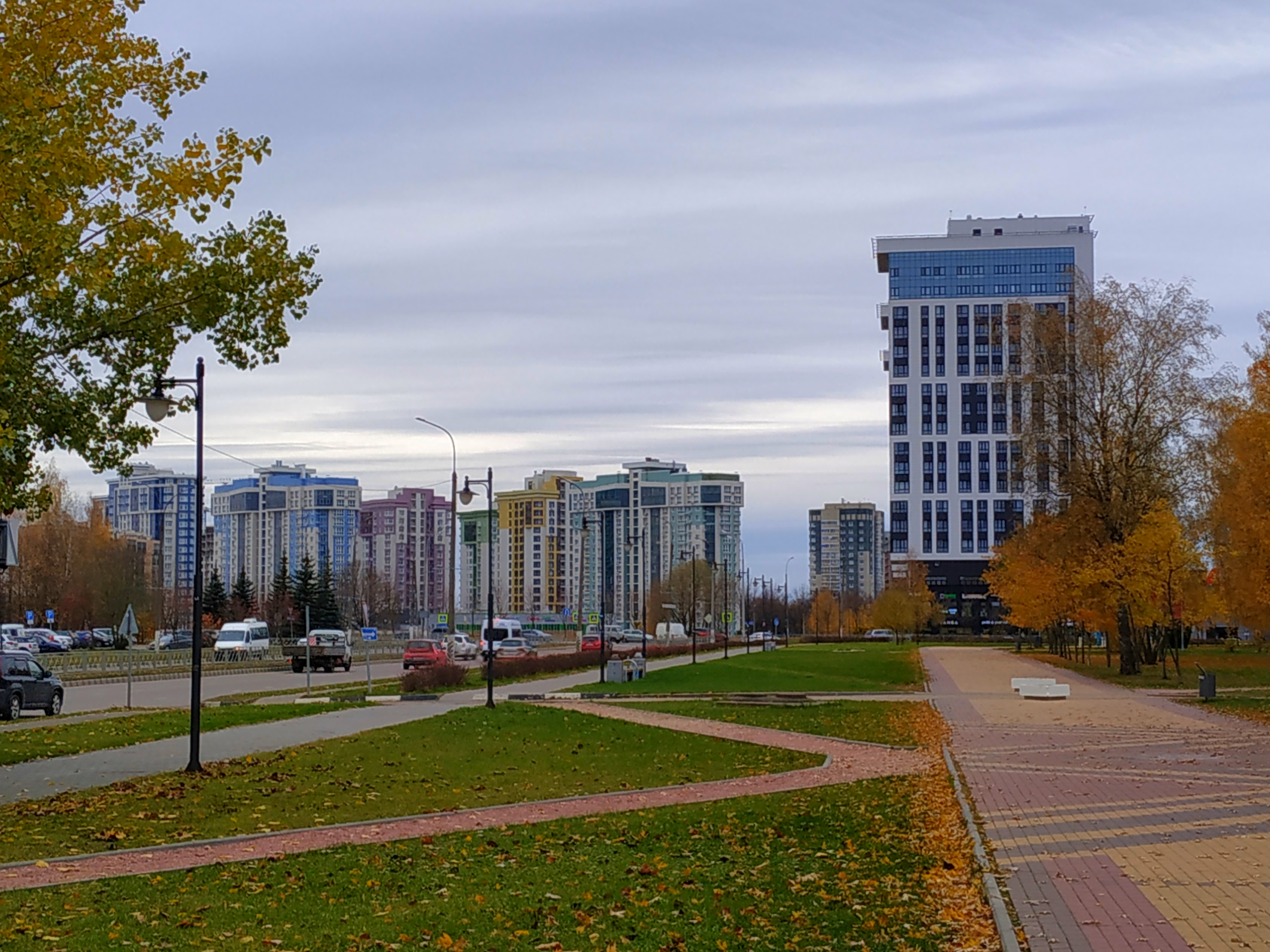
Buildings on Lenin Prospekt

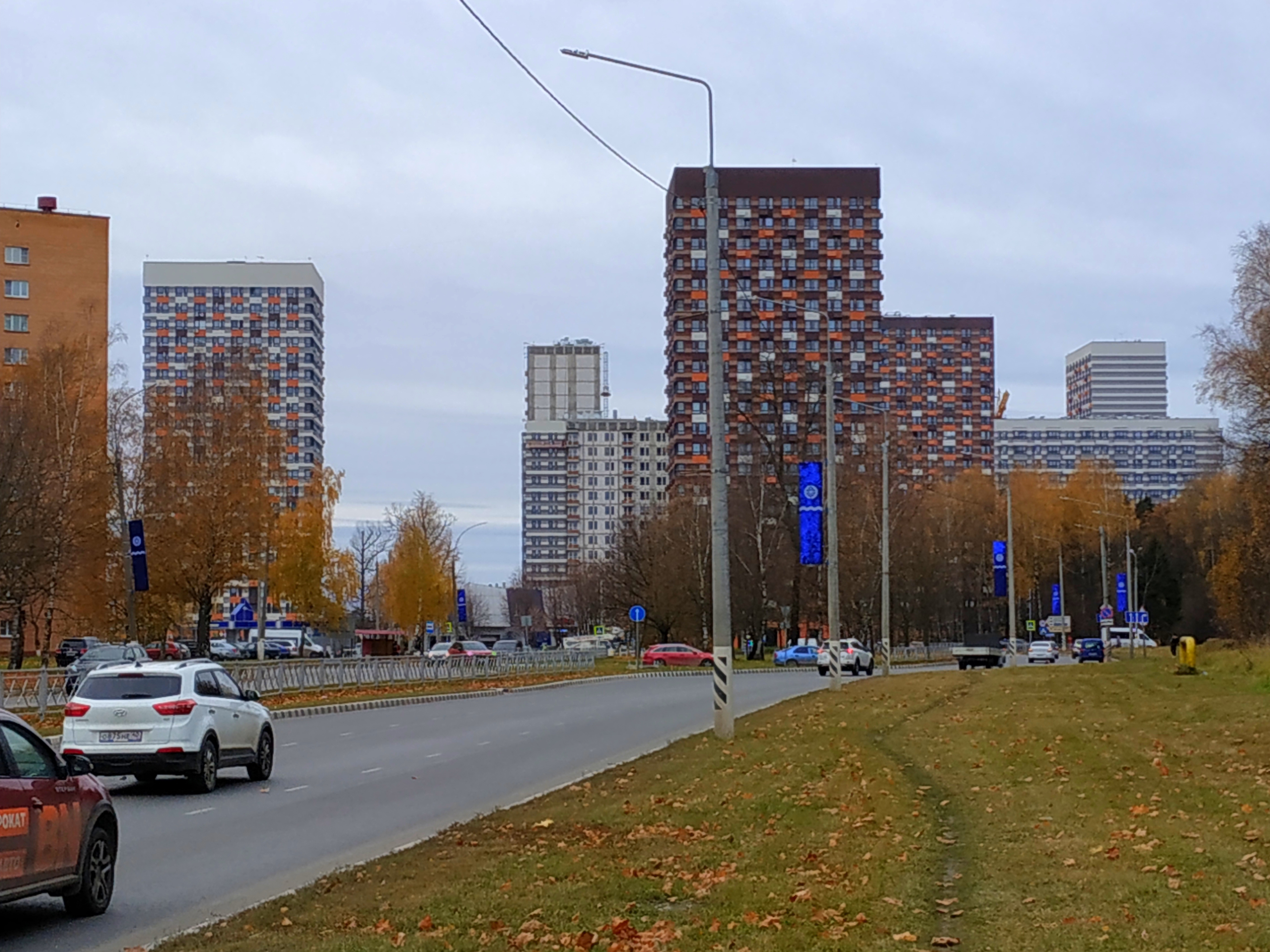
Marx Prospekt

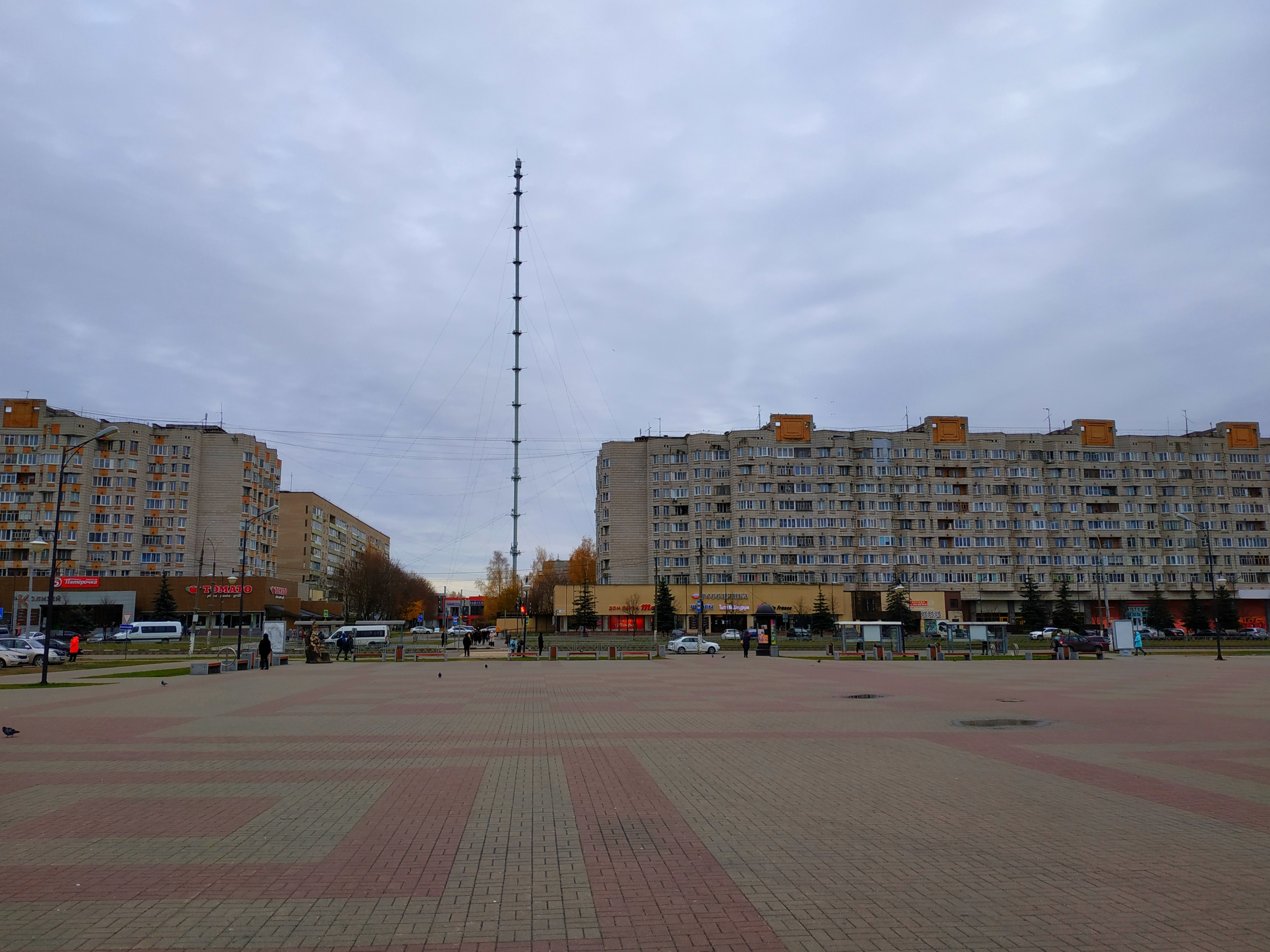
Downtown

== Administrative and municipal status ==
Within the framework of administrative divisions, it is incorporated as the City of Obninsk — an administrative unit with the status equal to that of the districts. As a municipal division, the City of Obninsk is incorporated as Obninsk Urban Okrug.

== Demographics ==
According to the 2021 Census, the population of the city was 125,376 (2021 census). According to the previous, 2010 Census, the population of the city was 104,739, down from 105,706 recorded in the 2002 Census, but up from 100,178 recorded in the 1989 Census.

The average age of the citizens is thirty-nine years.

Historical population
Year	Pop.	±%
1959	16,334	—
1970	48,641	+197.8%
1979	73,402	+50.9%
1989	100,178	+36.5%
2002	105,706	+5.5%
2010	104,739	−0.9%
2021	125,376	+19.7%
Source: Census data

== Transportation ==
The city is located on the main rail line between Moscow and Kyiv and at the intersection of Kiev and Warsaw highways. Three international airports are within reach from Obninsk: Vnukovo (70 km), Domodedovo (100 km), and Sheremetyevo (130 km). Cargo airfield Yermolino is only 15 kilometers (9.3 mi) away.

== Science and education ==
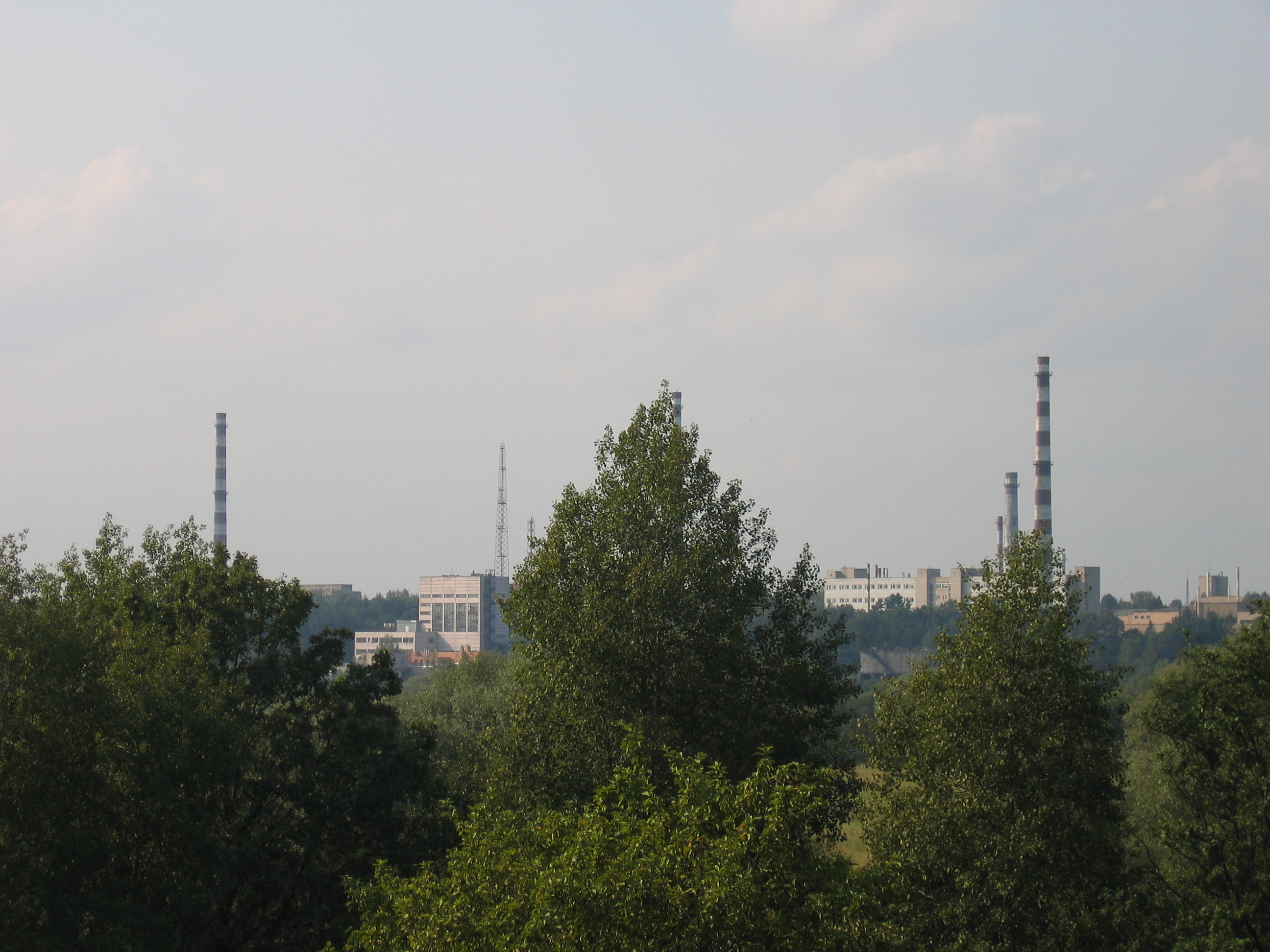
View of the former Obninsk Nuclear Power Plant

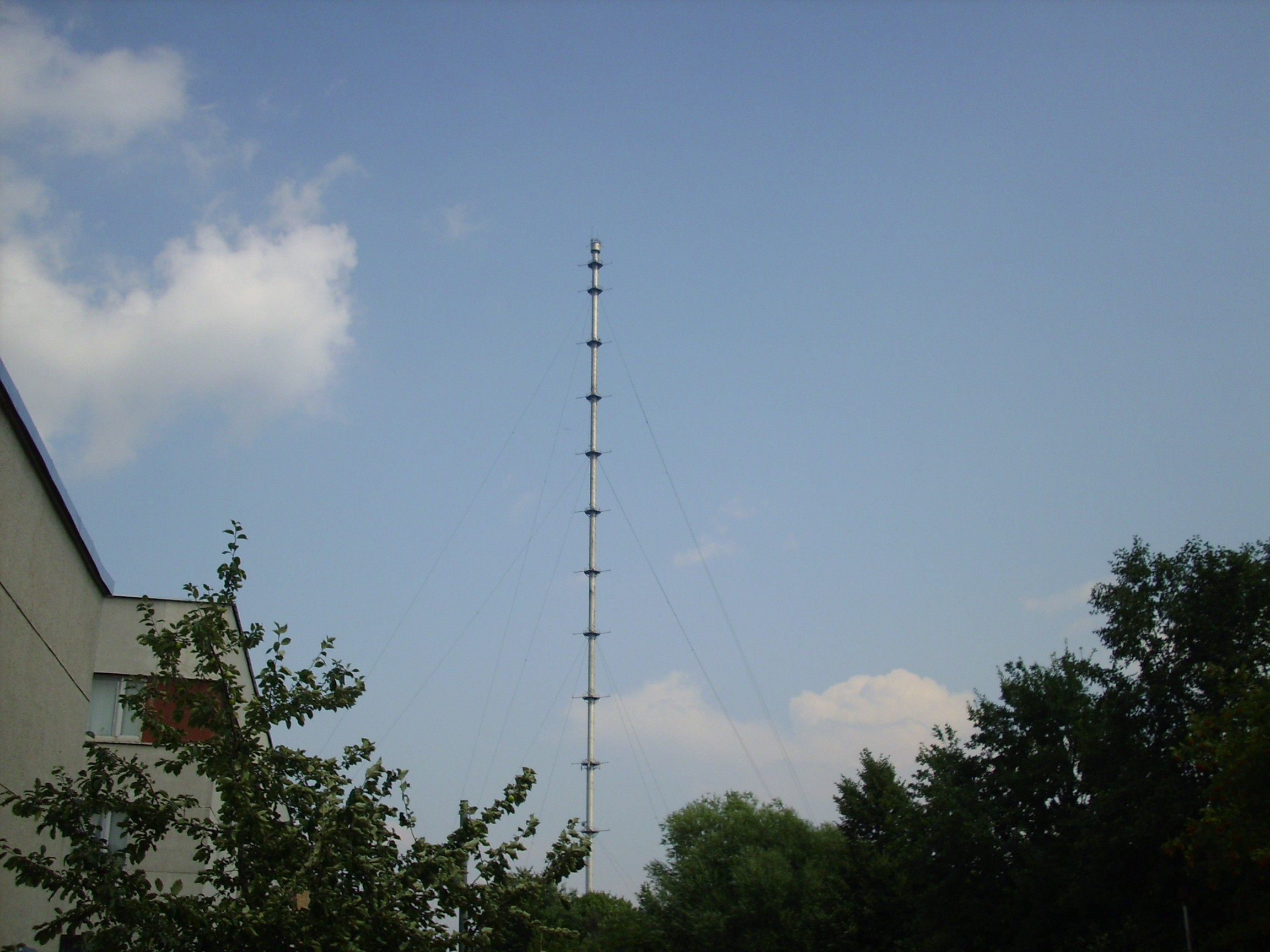
Obninsk Meteorological tower is an official landmark of Obninsk

Obninsk is one of the major Russian science cities. In 2000, it was awarded the status of the First Science City of Russia. The city is home to twelve scientific research institutes. Their main activities are nuclear power engineering, nuclear methods and radiation technology, technology of non-metallic materials, medical radiology, meteorology and ecology and environmental protection.

The first nuclear power plant in the world for the large-scale production of electricity opened here on June 27, 1954, and it also doubled as a training base for the crew of the Soviet Union's first nuclear submarine, the K-3 Leninsky Komsomol.

Obninsk is famous for its meteorological tower which was built to study spreading of radiation from the nuclear station.

The following institutes are located in the city:

- State Scientific Center of Russian Federation Institute for Physics and Power Engineering
- State Scientific Center of Russian Federation Obninsk Scientific Production Enterprise "Tekhnologiya"
- Medical Radiological Research Center of the Russian Academy of Medical Sciences
- Obninsk Branch of the State Scientific Center of the Russian Federation "Karpov Institute of Physical Chemistry"
- Obninsk Institute for Nuclear Power Engineering
- Russian Research Institute of Hydrometeorological Information (World Data Center)
- Central Pilot Expedition of the Geophysical Service of the Russian Academy of Sciences
- Russian Research Institute of Agricultural Radiology and Agroecology
- Central Design Bureau of Hydrometeorological Instrumentation
- Russian Research Institute of Agricultural Meteorology
- Scientific Production Association TYPHOON

== Economy ==
Situated in Obninsk are the plants of companies such as Kraftway (the largest manufacturer of personal computers in Russia), Rautaruukki, Lotte Confectionery, Hemofarm a.d.

== Government ==
The head of the city administration is Tatyana Leonova.

== Public organizations ==
=== Political parties ===
- United Russia, Obninsk branch.
- Communist Party of the Russian Federation, Obninsk branch.

=== Social movements ===
- Obninsk — territory of innovative development.
- Kosmopoisk. The coordinator of the Obninsk group is Vladimir Yemelyanov.

=== Children's organizations ===
- Organization of Russian Young Pathfinders, Obninsk squad.
- All-Russian public organization Small Academy of Sciences "Intelligence of the Future".
- National Organization of Volunteers "Rus", 48th detachment of cavalry general Pyotr Krasnov "Legend".

== Sport ==
There is a football club called Kvant.
There is a bandy club called Atom.

== Twin towns – sister cities ==
Obninsk is twinned with:

- Astravyets, Belarus
- Belene, Bulgaria
- Frascati, Italy
- Mianyang, China
- Montpellier, France
- Oak Ridge, United States
- Visaginas, Lithuania
