= 1993 in Russian football =

1993 season

1993 was the second season Russia held its own national football competition since the breakup of the Soviet Union.

== Club competitions ==
FC Spartak Moscow won the league for the second time in a row.

For more details, see:

- 1993 Russian Top League
- 1993 Russian First League
- 1993 Russian Second League

== Cup competitions ==
The first ever edition of the Russian Cup, 1992–93 Russian Cup was won by FC Torpedo Moscow, who beat PFC CSKA Moscow in the finals in a shootout 5-3 after finishing extra time at 1-1.

Early stages of the 1993–94 Russian Cup were played later in the year.

== European club competitions ==
=== 1992–93 UEFA Champions League ===
PFC CSKA Moscow continued their group campaign and finished it without much success, only gaining 2 points in 6 games, coming in last in the group and suffering a 0-6 defeat against Marseille. They could not play their home games in Moscow due to the lack of a stadium meeting the Champions League standards at the time.

- March 3, 1993 / Group A, Day 3 / PFC CSKA Moscow - Marseille (France) 1-1 (Faizulin 54' - Pelé 27') / Berlin, Olympic Stadium / Attendance: 10,000

PFC CSKA Moscow: Plotnikov, Mamchur, Kolotovkin (captain), Bystrov, Malyukov, Antonovich, Minko (Karsakov, 55), Ivanov (Dudnyk, 46), Sergeyev, Bushmanov, Faizulin.

- March 17, 1993 / Group A, Day 4 / Marseille - PFC CSKA Moscow 6-0 (Sauzée 4' (pen.) 34' 48' Pelé 42' Ferreri 72' Desailly 79') / Marseille, Stade Vélodrome / Attendance: 35,000

PFC CSKA Moscow: Guteyev, Mamchur, Kolotovkin (captain), Bystrov, Malyukov, Antonovich, Minko, Mashkarin (Karsakov, 40), Sergeyev, Bushmanov (Grishin, 46), Faizulin.

- April 7, 1993 / Group A, Day 5 / PFC CSKA Moscow - Club Brugge (Belgium) 1-2 (Sergeyev 19' - Schaessens 44' Verheyen 84') / Berlin, Olympic Stadium / Attendance: 2,500

PFC CSKA Moscow: Plotnikov, Guschin, Kolotovkin (captain), Mashkarin, Malyukov, Bushmanov, Minko, Karsakov (Mamchur, 70), Ivanov (Antonovich, 32), Faizulin, Sergeyev.

- April 21, 1993 / Group A, Day 6 / Rangers (Scotland) - PFC CSKA Moscow 0-0 / Glasgow, Ibrox Stadium / Attendance: 43,142

PFC CSKA Moscow: Plotnikov, Guschin, Mamchur, Mashkarin, Malyukov (captain), Bushmanov, Minko, Karsakov, Antonovich, Sergeyev, Faizulin (Dudnyk, 60).

=== 1992–93 European Cup Winners' Cup ===
FC Spartak Moscow reached the semifinals, tying the best European result in club's history.

- March 2, 1993 / Quarterfinals, First Leg / Feyenoord (Netherlands - FC Spartak Moscow 0-1 (Piatnitski 36') / Rotterdam, de Kuip / Attendance: 33,187

FC Spartak Moscow: Cherchesov (captain), Khlestov, Ivanov, Popov (Gashkin, 89), Beschastnykh, Chernyshov, Onopko, Karpin (Pisarev, 72), Piatnitski, Lediakhov, Radchenko.

- March 18, 1993 / Quarterfinals, Return Leg / FC Spartak Moscow - Feyenoord 3-1 (Karpin 7' 83' Radchenko 90' Cherenkov (red card) 85' - Kiprich 14' van Gobbel (red card) 85') / Moscow, Torpedo Stadium / Attendance: 15,000

FC Spartak Moscow: Cherchesov, Khlestov (Mamedov, 62), Ivanov, Popov, Bondar, Lediakhov, Onopko (captain), Karpin, Piatnitski, Cherenkov, Radchenko.

- April 7, 1993 / Semifinals, First Leg / FC Spartak Moscow - Royal Antwerp FC (Belgium) 1-0 (Piatnitski 36') / Moscow, Luzhniki Stadium / Attendance: 75,000

FC Spartak Moscow: Cherchesov, Khlestov, Ivanov, Popov, Beschastnykh, Chernyshov, Mamedov, Karpin (captain), Piatnitski, Lediakhov, Radchenko (Pisarev, 57).

- April 22, 1993 / Semifinals, Return Leg / Royal Antwerp FC - FC Spartak Moscow 3-1 (Czerniatynski 38' Jakovljević 67' Lehnhoff 78' (pen.) - Radchenko 9' Onopko (yellow card) 77' (red card) ) / Antwerp, Bosuilstadion / Attendance: 27,000

FC Spartak Moscow: Cherchesov, Khlestov, Ivanov, Popov (Gashkin, 42), Pisarev, Chernyshov, Onopko (captain), Karpin, Piatnitski, Lediakhov, Radchenko (Baksheyev, 44).

=== 1993–94 UEFA Champions League ===
FC Spartak Moscow qualified for the group stage and continued to play in the group into the 1994.

- September 15, 1993 / First Round, First Leg / Skonto FC (Latvia) - FC Spartak Moscow 0-5 (Pohodin 2' Rodionov 7' 39' 41' Beschastnykh 65') / Riga, Daugava Stadium / Attendance: 2,900

FC Spartak Moscow: Staučė (Pomazun, 33), Khlestov, Mamedov, Tsymbalar, Rodionov, Nikiforov, Onopko (captain), Karpin, Pohodin, Lediakhov, Beschastnykh.

- September 29, 1993 / First Round, Return Leg / FC Spartak Moscow - Skonto FC 4-0 (Tsymbalar 7' 39' Pisarev 14' Onopko 89') / Moscow, Luzhniki Stadium / Attendance: 3,500

FC Spartak Moscow: Pomazun, Khlestov, Mamedov, Tsymbalar, Pisarev (Tikhonov, 70), Ananko, Onopko (captain), Karpin, Piatnitski, Rodionov, Beschastnykh (Lediakhov, 60).

- October 20, 1993 / Second Round, First Leg / Lech Poznań (Poland) - FC Spartak Moscow 1-5 (Podbrożny 44' (pen.) - Pisarev 8' 62' Karpin 10' Onopko 30' 53') / Poznań, Miejski / Attendance: 12,000

FC Spartak Moscow: Pomazun, Khlestov, Mamedov, Tsymbalar, Pisarev, Nikiforov, Onopko (captain), Karpin, Ananko, Cherenkov (Lediakhov, 51), Beschastnykh (Tikhonov, 75).

- November 3, 1993 / Second Round, Return Leg / FC Spartak Moscow - Lech Poznań 2-1 (Karpin 7' Khlestov 81' - Dembiński 30') / Moscow, Luzhniki Stadium / Attendance: 10,000

FC Spartak Moscow: Pomazun, Khlestov, Mamedov, Tsymbalar, Pisarev, Nikiforov, Onopko (captain), Karpin, Ananko (Cherenkov, 40), Lediakhov, Beschastnykh.

- November 24, 1993 / Group A, Day 1 / AS Monaco (France) - FC Spartak Moscow 4-1 (Klinsmann 17' Ikpeba 40' Djorkaeff 62' (pen.) Thuram 89' - Pisarev 48') / Monaco, Stade Louis II / Attendance: 20,000

FC Spartak Moscow: Pomazun, Khlestov, Ivanov, Tsymbalar, Pisarev, Nikiforov, Onopko (captain), Karpin, Mamedov, Lediakhov (Piatnitski, 46), Beschastnykh (Rodionov, 74).

- December 8, 1993 / Group A, Day 2 / FC Spartak Moscow - Galatasaray S.K. (Turkey) 0-0 (Mamedov (red card) 26' - Stumpf (yellow card) 73' (yellow-red card) ) / Moscow, Luzhniki Stadium / Attendance: 50,000

FC Spartak Moscow: Pomazun, Khlestov (Ivanov, 33), Mamedov, Tsymbalar, Pisarev, Nikiforov, Onopko (captain), Karpin, Piatnitski, Lediakhov, Beschastnykh (Ananko, 58).

=== 1993–94 UEFA Cup Winners' Cup ===
FC Torpedo Moscow went out in the first round.

- September 15, 1993 / First Round, First Leg / FC Torpedo Moscow - Maccabi Haifa (Israel) 1-0 (Borisov 88') / Moscow, Torpedo Stadium / Attendance: 4,000

FC Torpedo Moscow: Podshivalov (captain), Kalaychev, Cheltsov, Afanasyev, Borisov, Chumachenko (Prokopenko, 79), Grishin, Filimonov (Ulyanov, 14), Talalayev, Chugainov, Pazemov.

- September 28, 1993 / First Round, Return Leg / Maccabi Haifa - FC Torpedo Moscow 3-1 (Mizrahi 6' Pets 72' Holtzman 75' - Kalaychev 12') / Haifa, Kiryat Eliezer Stadium / Attendance: 9,000

FC Torpedo Moscow: Podshivalov (captain), Kalaychev (Savichev, 46), Cheltsov, Afanasyev, Ulyanov (Solovyov, 82), Shustikov, Grishin, Vostrosablin, Talalayev, Chugainov, Borisov.

=== 1993–94 UEFA Cup ===
All three participating Russian teams drew very tough opponents in the first round and all were eliminated. FC Spartak Vladikavkaz and FC Lokomotiv Moscow played in Europe for the first time in their history.

- September 14, 1993 / First round, first leg / FC Dynamo Moscow – Eintracht Frankfurt (Germany) 0–6 (Gaudino 9' Weber 25' Furtok 45' Bein 48' Okocha 81' Yeboah 89') / Moscow, Dynamo Stadium / Attendance: 14,000

FC Dynamo Moscow: Smetanin, Selezov, Kovtun, Smertin, Kalitvintsev, Chernyshov, Tedeyev, Cheryshev, Tetradze, Dobrovolski (captain), Rybakov (Nekrasov, 46).

- September 15, 1993 / First round, first leg / Borussia Dortmund (Germany) – FC Spartak Vladikavkaz 0–0 / Dortmund, Westfalenstadion / Attendance: 35,539

FC Spartak Vladikavkaz: Khapov, Pagayev, Denisov, Yanovskiy, Dzhioyev (captain), Alchagirov, Kostin (Saprykin, 90), Markhel (Isayev, 65), Dzoblayev, Suleymanov, Gazdanov.

- September 15, 1993 / First round, first leg / Juventus (Italy) – FC Lokomotiv Moscow 3–0 (Baggio 49' 86' Ravanelli 69') / Turin, Stadio delle Alpi / Attendance: 26,267

FC Lokomotiv Moscow: Ovchinnikov, Arifullin, Rakhimov, Podpaly (captain), Sabitov, Drozdov, Kosolapov, Alenichev, Samatov, Smirnov (Gorkov, 65), Petrov (Garin, 54).

- September 28, 1993 / First round, return leg / Eintracht Frankfurt – FC Dynamo Moscow 1–2 (Furtok 65' – Simutenkov 23' Dobrovolski 53') / Frankfurt am Main, Waldstadion / Attendance: 4,900

FC Dynamo Moscow: Kleimyonov, Selezov, Krutov (Nekrasov, 71), Smertin, Kalitvintsev, Chernyshov, Tedeyev, Cheryshev (Savchenko, 86), Tetradze, Dobrovolski (captain), Simutenkov.

- September 28, 1993 / First round, return leg / FC Spartak Vladikavkaz – Borussia Dortmund 0–1 (Chapuisat 62' Kutowski (yellow card) 88' (yellow-red card) ) / Vladikavkaz, Republican Spartak Stadium / Attendance: 33,000

FC Spartak Vladikavkaz: Khapov, Pagayev, Denisov, Yanovskiy, Dzhioyev (captain), Alchagirov, Kostin (Igor B. Kachmazov, 52), Markhel, Dzoblayev, Suleymanov, Gazdanov.

- September 28, 1993 / First round, return leg / FC Lokomotiv Moscow – Juventus 0–1 (Marocchi 53') / Moscow, Lokomotiv Stadium / Attendance: 7,000

FC Lokomotiv Moscow: Ovchinnikov, Arifullin, Rakhimov, Podpaly (captain), Sabitov, Fuzailov (Gorkov, 59), Kosolapov, Alenichev, Samatov, Smirnov, Nikulkin.

== National team ==
Russia national football team qualified for 1994 FIFA World Cup after coming second in the qualifying group behind the winners Greece. Pavel Sadyrin was the manager in 1993.

- February 13, 1993 / Friendly / United States - Russia 0-1 (Sergeyev 12') / Orlando, Citrus Bowl / Attendance: 13,650

Russia: Cherchesov (captain), Khlestov, Chernyshov, Ivanov, Onopko, Lediakhov (Afanasyev, 58), Popov (Tedeyev, 33), Karpin, Beschastnykh, Sergeyev (Matveyev, 70), Radchenko.

- February 17, 1993 / Friendly / El Salvador - Russia 1-2 (Díaz Arce 60' - Onopko 53' (pen.) Tedeyev 55' Radchenko (red card) 40') / Pasadena, Rose Bowl / Attendance: 16,000

Russia: Ovchinnikov, Khlestov, Sklyarov, Ivanov, Afanasyev, Onopko (captain), Karpin (Sergeyev, 46), Lediakhov, Tedeyev, Beschastnykh (Matveyev, 78), Radchenko.

- February 21, 1993 / Friendly / United States - Russia 0-0 / Palo Alto, Stanford Stadium / Attendance: 26,450.

Russia: Cherchesov (captain), Khlestov, Chernyshov, Ivanov, Onopko, Lediakhov, Karpin, Popov (Tedeyev, 46), Beschastnykh (Matveyev, 46), Sergeyev, Radchenko.

- March 24, 1993 / Friendly / Israel - Russia 2-2 (Mizrahi 64' 70' - Popov 50' 62' Kiriakov (red card) 41' Onopko (yellow card) 73' (red card) ) / Haifa, Kiryat Eliezer Stadium / Attendance: 3,000

Russia: Cherchesov, Kuznetsov, Gorlukovich, Mokh, Ivanov, Kulkov, Onopko (captain), Karpin, Korneev, Radchenko (Popov, 46), Kiriakov.

- April 14, 1993 / 1994 FIFA World Cup qualifier / Luxembourg - Russia 0-4 (Kiriakov 11' 46' Shalimov 58' Kulkov 90') / Luxembourg, Stade Josy Barthel / Attendance: 3,200

Russia: Cherchesov, Gorlukovich, Ivanov, Onopko, Kanchelskis, Shalimov (captain), Dobrovolski, Korneev (Kulkov, 66), Kolyvanov, Yuran, Kiriakov (Popov, 77).

- April 28, 1993 / 1994 FIFA World Cup qualifier / Russia - Hungary 3-0 (Kanchelskis 55' Kolyvanov 61' Yuran 85') / Moscow, Luzhniki Stadium / Attendance: 25,000

Russia: Kharine, Onopko, Ivanov, Gorlukovich, Kanchelskis, Shalimov (captain), Dobrovolski, Korneev (Kulkov, 56), Kolyvanov, Yuran, Kiriakov (Mostovoi, 74).

- May 23, 1993 / 1994 FIFA World Cup qualifier / Russia - Greece 1-1 (Dobrovolski 70' (pen.) - Mitropoulos 45') / Moscow, Luzhniki Stadium / Attendance: 45,000

Russia: Kharine, Gorlukovich, Onopko, Ivanov, Kanchelskis, Shalimov (captain), Dobrovolski, Kulkov (Tatarchuk, 65), Kolyvanov, Yuran, Kiriakov.

- June 2, 1993 / 1994 FIFA World Cup qualifier / Iceland - Russia 1-1 (Sverrisson 26' - Kiriakov 39') / Reykjavík, Laugardalsvöllur / Attendance: 12,500

Russia: Kharine, Gorlukovich, Onopko (captain), Ivanov, Kanchelskis, Tatarchuk (Korneev, 68), Dobrovolski, Kulkov, Kolyvanov, Yuran (Lediakhov, 75), Kiriakov.

- July 28, 1993 / Friendly / France - Russia 3-1 (Sauzée 17' Cantona 20' Papin 37' - Blanc 23' (o.g.)) / Caen, Stade Michel d'Ornano / Attendance: 22,000

Russia: Cherchesov, Khlestov (Popov, 46), Onopko (captain), Ivanov, Kanchelskis, Gorlukovich, Lediakhov, Karpin (Tetradze, 70), Piatnitski, Yuran, Radchenko (Faizulin, 65).

- September 8, 1993 / 1994 FIFA World Cup qualifier / Hungary - Russia 1-3 (Nikiforov 20' (o.g.) - Piatnitski 15' Kiriakov 52' Borodyuk 90') / Budapest, Stadion Üllői Út / Attendance: 15,000

Russia: Kharine, Gorlukovich, Onopko, Ivanov, Kanchelskis, Shalimov (captain), Piatnitski (Dobrovolski, 70), Nikiforov, Kolyvanov, Yuran (Borodyuk, 55), Kiriakov.

- October 6, 1993 / Friendly / Saudi Arabia - Russia 4-2 (Al-Muwallid 33' (pen.) Galiamin 60' (o.g.) Idris 65' Al-Mehallel 88' - Mostovoi 23' 72') / Dammam, Prince Mohamed bin Fahd Stadium / Attendance: 20,000

Russia: Ovchinnikov (Podshivalov, 63), Galiamin, Onopko (captain), Kulkov, Khlestov, Karpin (Kosolapov, 63), Piatnitski, Tetradze, Mostovoi, Yuran, Beschastnykh (Tedeyev, 63).

- November 17, 1993 / 1994 FIFA World Cup qualifier / Greece - Russia 1-0 (Machlas 70') / Athens, Olympic Stadium / Attendance: 70,000

Russia: Cherchesov, Khlestov, Onopko, Nikiforov, Kulkov, Shalimov (captain), Dobrovolski, Popov (Mostovoi, 82), Kolyvanov, Yuran (Salenko, 46), Kiriakov.
