= UEFA Euro 1992 squads =

1992 football tournament

The following is a list of squads for each nation that competed at Euro 1992 in Sweden.

Each nation had to submit a squad of 20 players, by 31 May 1992. Denmark were given until 4 June to enter their final squad, having only been invited to play in the tournament on 30 May 1992, following the suspension of Yugoslavia from sporting competitions.

The players' age, caps and clubs are as of 9 June 1992 (the tournament started on 10 June).

== Group A ==
=== Denmark ===
Manager: Richard Møller Nielsen

No.	Pos.	Player	Date of birth (age)	Caps	Goals	Club
1	GK	Peter Schmeichel	18 November 1963 (aged 28)	47	0	(The Football Association) Manchester United
2	DF	John Sivebæk	25 October 1961 (aged 30)	77	1	(French Football Federation) Monaco
3	DF	Kent Nielsen	28 December 1961 (aged 30)	50	3	(Danish Football Association) Aarhus
4	DF	Lars Olsen (captain)	2 February 1961 (aged 31)	57	3	(Turkish Football Federation) Trabzonspor
5	MF	Henrik Andersen	7 May 1965 (aged 27)	25	2	(German Football Association) 1. FC Köln
6	DF	Kim Christofte	24 August 1960 (aged 31)	11	1	(Danish Football Association) Brøndby
7	MF	John Jensen	3 May 1965 (aged 27)	43	1	(Danish Football Association) Brøndby
8	MF	Johnny Mølby	4 February 1969 (aged 23)	14	0	(French Football Federation) Nantes
9	FW	Flemming Povlsen	3 December 1966 (aged 25)	45	17	(German Football Association) Borussia Dortmund
10	FW	Lars Elstrup	24 March 1963 (aged 29)	23	11	(Danish Football Association) Odense
11	FW	Brian Laudrup	22 February 1969 (aged 23)	25	5	(German Football Association) Bayern Munich
12	DF	Torben Piechnik	21 May 1963 (aged 29)	4	0	(Danish Football Association) B.1903
13	MF	Henrik Larsen	17 May 1966 (aged 26)	18	1	(Danish Football Association) Lyngby
14	FW	Torben Frank	16 June 1968 (aged 23)	3	0	(Danish Football Association) Lyngby
15	FW	Bent Christensen	4 January 1967 (aged 25)	16	8	(German Football Association) Schalke 04
16	GK	Mogens Krogh	31 October 1963 (aged 28)	1	0	(Danish Football Association) Brøndby
17	DF	Claus Christiansen	19 October 1967 (aged 24)	2	0	(Danish Football Association) Lyngby
18	MF	Kim Vilfort	15 November 1962 (aged 29)	42	6	(Danish Football Association) Brøndby
19	MF	Peter Nielsen	3 March 1968 (aged 24)	2	0	(Danish Football Association) Lyngby
20	MF	Morten Bruun	28 June 1965 (aged 26)	11	0	(Danish Football Association) Silkeborg

=== England ===
Manager: Graham Taylor

No.	Pos.	Player	Date of birth (age)	Caps	Goals	Club
1	GK	Chris Woods	14 November 1959 (aged 32)	31	0	(The Football Association) Sheffield Wednesday
2	DF	Keith Curle	14 November 1963 (aged 28)	2	0	(The Football Association) Manchester City
3	DF	Stuart Pearce	24 April 1962 (aged 30)	47	2	(The Football Association) Nottingham Forest
4	DF	Martin Keown	24 July 1966 (aged 25)	6	1	(The Football Association) Everton
5	DF	Des Walker	26 November 1965 (aged 26)	44	0	(The Football Association) Nottingham Forest
6	DF	Mark Wright	1 August 1963 (aged 28)	42	1	(The Football Association) Liverpool
7	MF	David Platt	10 June 1966 (aged 25)	29	10	(Italian Football Federation) Bari
8	MF	Trevor Steven	21 September 1963 (aged 28)	34	4	(French Football Federation) Marseille
9	FW	Nigel Clough	19 March 1966 (aged 26)	7	0	(The Football Association) Nottingham Forest
10	FW	Gary Lineker (captain)	30 November 1960 (aged 31)	77	48	(The Football Association) Tottenham Hotspur
11	MF	Andy Sinton	19 March 1966 (aged 26)	4	0	(The Football Association) Queens Park Rangers
12	MF	Carlton Palmer	5 December 1965 (aged 26)	4	0	(The Football Association) Sheffield Wednesday
13	GK	Nigel Martyn	11 August 1966 (aged 25)	2	0	(The Football Association) Crystal Palace
14	DF	Tony Dorigo	31 December 1965 (aged 26)	10	0	(The Football Association) Leeds United
15	MF	Neil Webb	30 July 1963 (aged 28)	24	3	(The Football Association) Manchester United
16	MF	Paul Merson	20 March 1968 (aged 24)	5	0	(The Football Association) Arsenal
17	FW	Alan Smith	21 November 1962 (aged 29)	11	2	(The Football Association) Arsenal
18	MF	Tony Daley	18 October 1967 (aged 24)	5	0	(The Football Association) Aston Villa
19	MF	David Batty	2 December 1968 (aged 23)	8	0	(The Football Association) Leeds United
20	FW	Alan Shearer	13 August 1970 (aged 21)	2	1	(The Football Association) Southampton

=== France ===
Manager: Michel Platini

No.	Pos.	Player	Date of birth (age)	Caps	Club
1	GK	Bruno Martini	25 January 1962 (aged 30)	22	(France) Auxerre
2	DF	Manuel Amoros (captain)	1 February 1962 (aged 30)	79	(France) Marseille
3	DF	Franck Silvestre	5 April 1967 (aged 25)	11	(France) Sochaux
4	MF	Emmanuel Petit	22 September 1970 (aged 21)	4	(France) Monaco
5	DF	Laurent Blanc	19 November 1965 (aged 26)	22	(Italy) Napoli
6	DF	Bernard Casoni	4 September 1961 (aged 30)	24	(France) Marseille
7	MF	Didier Deschamps	15 October 1968 (aged 23)	21	(France) Marseille
8	MF	Franck Sauzée	28 October 1965 (aged 26)	25	(France) Marseille
9	FW	Jean-Pierre Papin	5 November 1963 (aged 28)	35	(France) Marseille
10	MF	Luis Fernandez	2 October 1959 (aged 32)	57	(France) Cannes
11	FW	Christian Perez	13 May 1963 (aged 29)	19	(France) Paris Saint-Germain
12	MF	Christophe Cocard	23 November 1967 (aged 24)	4	(France) Auxerre
13	DF	Basile Boli	2 January 1967 (aged 25)	35	(France) Marseille
14	MF	Jean-Philippe Durand	11 November 1960 (aged 31)	20	(France) Marseille
15	FW	Fabrice Divert	2 September 1967 (aged 24)	3	(France) Montpellier
16	MF	Pascal Vahirua	9 March 1966 (aged 26)	13	(France) Auxerre
17	MF	Rémi Garde	3 April 1966 (aged 26)	6	(France) Lyon
18	FW	Eric Cantona	24 May 1966 (aged 26)	24	(England) Leeds United
19	GK	Gilles Rousset	22 August 1963 (aged 28)	2	(France) Lyon
20	DF	Jocelyn Angloma	7 August 1965 (aged 26)	10	(France) Marseille

=== Sweden ===
Manager: Tommy Svensson

No.	Pos.	Player	Date of birth (age)	Caps	Club
1	GK	Thomas Ravelli	13 August 1959 (aged 32)	89	(Sweden) IFK Göteborg
2	DF	Roland Nilsson	27 November 1963 (aged 28)	48	(England) Sheffield Wednesday
3	DF	Jan Eriksson	24 August 1967 (aged 24)	20	(Sweden) IFK Norrköping
4	DF	Patrik Andersson	18 August 1971 (aged 20)	9	(Sweden) Malmö FF
5	DF	Joachim Björklund	15 March 1971 (aged 21)	8	(Norway) Brann
6	MF	Stefan Schwarz	18 April 1969 (aged 23)	13	(Portugal) Benfica
7	MF	Klas Ingesson	20 August 1968 (aged 23)	23	(Belgium) KV Mechelen
8	MF	Stefan Rehn	22 September 1966 (aged 25)	28	(Sweden) IFK Göteborg
9	MF	Jonas Thern (captain)	20 March 1967 (aged 25)	34	(Portugal) Benfica
10	MF	Anders Limpar	24 September 1965 (aged 26)	36	(England) Arsenal
11	FW	Tomas Brolin	29 November 1969 (aged 22)	20	(Italy) Parma
12	GK	Lars Eriksson	21 September 1965 (aged 26)	8	(Sweden) IFK Norrköping
13	DF	Mikael Nilsson	28 September 1968 (aged 23)	7	(Sweden) IFK Göteborg
14	DF	Magnus Erlingmark	8 July 1967 (aged 24)	16	(Sweden) Örebro
15	MF	Jan Jansson	26 January 1968 (aged 24)	5	(Sweden) Östers IF
16	FW	Kennet Andersson	6 October 1967 (aged 24)	15	(Belgium) KV Mechelen
17	FW	Martin Dahlin	16 April 1968 (aged 24)	14	(Germany) Borussia Mönchengladbach
18	DF	Roger Ljung	8 January 1966 (aged 26)	34	(Austria) Admira Wacker
19	MF	Joakim Nilsson	31 March 1966 (aged 26)	30	(Spain) Sporting Gijón
20	FW	Johnny Ekström	5 March 1965 (aged 27)	38	(Sweden) IFK Göteborg

== Group B ==
=== CIS ===
Manager: Anatoliy Byshovets

Caps include those won for the Soviet Union national team.

No.	Pos.	Player	Date of birth (age)	Caps	Club
1	GK	Dmitri Kharine	16 August 1968 (aged 23)	12	(Russia) CSKA Moscow
2	DF	Andrey Chernyshov	7 January 1968 (aged 24)	23	(Russia) Spartak Moscow
3	DF	Kakhaber Tskhadadze	7 September 1968 (aged 23)	5	(Russia) Spartak Moscow
4	DF	Akhrik Tsveiba	10 September 1966 (aged 25)	22	(Ukraine) Dynamo Kyiv
5	DF	Oleh Kuznetsov	22 March 1963 (aged 29)	60	(Scotland) Rangers
6	MF	Igor Shalimov	2 February 1969 (aged 23)	23	(Italy) Foggia
7	MF	Oleksiy Mykhaylychenko (captain)	30 March 1963 (aged 29)	38	(Scotland) Rangers
8	MF	Andrei Kanchelskis	23 January 1969 (aged 23)	20	(England) Manchester United
9	MF	Sergei Aleinikov	7 November 1961 (aged 30)	75	(Italy) Lecce
10	MF	Igor Dobrovolski	27 August 1967 (aged 24)	26	(Switzerland) Servette
11	FW	Sergei Yuran	11 June 1969 (aged 22)	13	(Portugal) Benfica
12	GK	Stanislav Cherchesov	2 September 1963 (aged 28)	10	(Russia) Spartak Moscow
13	FW	Sergei Kiriakov	1 January 1970 (aged 22)	8	(Russia) Dynamo Moscow
14	FW	Volodymyr Lyutyi	20 April 1962 (aged 30)	5	(Germany) MSV Duisburg
15	FW	Igor Kolyvanov	6 March 1968 (aged 24)	22	(Italy) Foggia
16	MF	Dmitri Kuznetsov	28 August 1965 (aged 26)	17	(Spain) Espanyol
17	MF	Igor Korneev	4 September 1967 (aged 24)	5	(Spain) Espanyol
18	DF	Viktor Onopko	14 October 1969 (aged 22)	1	(Russia) Spartak Moscow
19	MF	Igor Lediakhov	22 May 1968 (aged 24)	7	(Russia) Spartak Moscow
20	DF	Andrei Ivanov	6 April 1967 (aged 25)	3	(Russia) Spartak Moscow

=== Germany ===
Manager: Berti Vogts

Caps included are for the unified German national team, or its predecessor West Germany. Thomas Doll (29 caps), Andreas Thom (51) and Matthias Sammer (23) all previously won caps for East Germany in addition.

No.	Pos.	Player	Date of birth (age)	Caps	Club
1	GK	Bodo Illgner	7 April 1967 (aged 25)	34	(Germany) 1. FC Köln
2	DF	Stefan Reuter	16 October 1966 (aged 25)	32	(Italy) Juventus
3	DF	Andreas Brehme (captain)	9 November 1960 (aged 31)	69	(Italy) Internazionale
4	DF	Jürgen Kohler	6 October 1965 (aged 26)	42	(Italy) Juventus
5	DF	Manfred Binz	22 September 1965 (aged 26)	11	(Germany) Eintracht Frankfurt
6	DF	Guido Buchwald	24 January 1961 (aged 31)	51	(Germany) VfB Stuttgart
7	MF	Andreas Möller	2 September 1967 (aged 24)	21	(Germany) Eintracht Frankfurt
8	MF	Thomas Häßler	30 May 1966 (aged 26)	29	(Italy) Roma
9	FW	Rudi Völler	13 April 1960 (aged 32)	83	(Italy) Roma
10	MF	Thomas Doll	9 April 1966 (aged 26)	9	(Italy) Lazio
11	FW	Karl-Heinz Riedle	16 September 1965 (aged 26)	20	(Italy) Lazio
12	GK	Andreas Köpke	12 March 1962 (aged 30)	3	(Germany) 1. FC Nürnberg
13	FW	Andreas Thom	7 September 1965 (aged 26)	4	(Germany) Bayer Leverkusen
14	DF	Thomas Helmer	21 April 1965 (aged 27)	7	(Germany) Borussia Dortmund
15	DF	Michael Frontzeck	26 March 1964 (aged 28)	17	(Germany) VfB Stuttgart
16	MF	Matthias Sammer	5 September 1967 (aged 24)	7	(Germany) VfB Stuttgart
17	MF	Stefan Effenberg	2 August 1968 (aged 23)	7	(Germany) Bayern Munich
18	FW	Jürgen Klinsmann	30 July 1964 (aged 27)	36	(Italy) Internazionale
19	DF	Michael Schulz	3 September 1961 (aged 30)	1	(Germany) Borussia Dortmund
20	DF	Christian Wörns	10 May 1972 (aged 20)	2	(Germany) Bayer Leverkusen

=== Netherlands ===
Manager: Rinus Michels

No.	Pos.	Player	Date of birth (age)	Caps	Club
1	GK	Hans van Breukelen	4 October 1956 (aged 35)	69	(Netherlands) PSV Eindhoven
2	DF	Berry van Aerle	8 December 1962 (aged 29)	31	(Netherlands) PSV Eindhoven
3	DF	Adri van Tiggelen	16 June 1957 (aged 34)	52	(Netherlands) PSV Eindhoven
4	DF	Ronald Koeman	21 March 1963 (aged 29)	56	(Spain) Barcelona
5	DF	Danny Blind	1 August 1961 (aged 30)	20	(Netherlands) Ajax
6	MF	Jan Wouters	17 July 1960 (aged 31)	48	(Germany) Bayern Munich
7	FW	Dennis Bergkamp	10 May 1969 (aged 23)	13	(Netherlands) Ajax
8	MF	Frank Rijkaard	30 September 1962 (aged 29)	52	(Italy) Milan
9	FW	Marco van Basten	31 October 1964 (aged 27)	51	(Italy) Milan
10	MF	Ruud Gullit (captain)	1 September 1962 (aged 29)	57	(Italy) Milan
11	MF	John van 't Schip	30 December 1963 (aged 28)	36	(Netherlands) Ajax
12	FW	Wim Kieft	12 November 1962 (aged 29)	40	(Netherlands) PSV Eindhoven
13	GK	Stanley Menzo	15 October 1963 (aged 28)	3	(Netherlands) Ajax
14	MF	Rob Witschge	22 August 1966 (aged 25)	7	(Netherlands) Feyenoord
15	MF	Aron Winter	1 March 1967 (aged 25)	23	(Netherlands) Ajax
16	MF	Peter Bosz	21 November 1963 (aged 28)	5	(Netherlands) Feyenoord
17	DF	Frank de Boer	15 May 1970 (aged 22)	7	(Netherlands) Ajax
18	MF	Wim Jonk	12 October 1966 (aged 25)	3	(Netherlands) Ajax
19	FW	Eric Viscaal	20 March 1968 (aged 24)	2	(Belgium) Gent
20	MF	Bryan Roy	12 February 1970 (aged 22)	8	(Netherlands) Ajax

=== Scotland ===
Manager: Andy Roxburgh

No.	Pos.	Player	Date of birth (age)	Caps	Club
1	GK	Andy Goram	13 April 1964 (aged 28)	20	(Scotland) Rangers
2	DF	Richard Gough (captain)	5 April 1962 (aged 30)	56	(Scotland) Rangers
3	MF	Paul McStay	22 October 1964 (aged 27)	57	(Scotland) Celtic
4	DF	Maurice Malpas	3 August 1962 (aged 29)	50	(Scotland) Dundee United
5	FW	Ally McCoist	24 September 1962 (aged 29)	38	(Scotland) Rangers
6	FW	Brian McClair	8 December 1963 (aged 28)	23	(England) Manchester United
7	FW	Gordon Durie	6 December 1965 (aged 26)	19	(England) Tottenham Hotspur
8	DF	David McPherson	28 January 1964 (aged 28)	20	(Scotland) Rangers
9	DF	Stewart McKimmie	27 October 1962 (aged 29)	17	(Scotland) Aberdeen
10	MF	Stuart McCall	10 June 1964 (aged 27)	17	(Scotland) Rangers
11	MF	Gary McAllister	25 December 1964 (aged 27)	15	(England) Leeds United
12	GK	Henry Smith	10 March 1956 (aged 36)	3	(Scotland) Heart of Midlothian
13	MF	Pat Nevin	6 September 1963 (aged 28)	12	(England) Everton
14	FW	Kevin Gallacher	23 November 1966 (aged 25)	9	(England) Coventry City
15	DF	Tom Boyd	24 November 1965 (aged 26)	9	(Scotland) Celtic
16	MF	Jim McInally	19 February 1964 (aged 28)	7	(Scotland) Dundee United
17	DF	Derek Whyte	31 August 1968 (aged 23)	4	(Scotland) Celtic
18	MF	Dave Bowman	10 March 1964 (aged 28)	2	(Scotland) Dundee United
19	DF	Alan McLaren	4 January 1971 (aged 21)	3	(Scotland) Heart of Midlothian
20	FW	Duncan Ferguson	27 December 1971 (aged 20)	2	(Scotland) Dundee United

== Expelled ==
FR Yugoslavia was disqualified ten days before the tournament due to Yugoslav wars.

=== FR Yugoslavia ===
Manager: Ivan Čabrinović

Caps include those won for the SFR Yugoslavia national team.

No.	Pos.	Player	Date of birth (age)	Caps	Club
1	GK	Dragoje Leković	21 November 1967 (aged 24)	14	(Federal Republic of Yugoslavia) Red Star Belgrade
2	DF	Vujadin Stanojković	10 September 1963 (aged 28)	21	(Federal Republic of Yugoslavia) Partizan
3	DF	Slobodan Dubajić	19 February 1963 (aged 29)	0	(Germany) VfB Stuttgart
4	MF	Slaviša Jokanović	16 August 1968 (aged 23)	6	(Federal Republic of Yugoslavia) Partizan
5	DF	Ilija Najdoski	26 March 1964 (aged 28)	11	(Federal Republic of Yugoslavia) Red Star Belgrade
6	MF	Branko Brnović	8 August 1967 (aged 24)	5	(Federal Republic of Yugoslavia) Partizan
7	MF	Vladimir Jugović	30 August 1969 (aged 22)	4	(Federal Republic of Yugoslavia) Red Star Belgrade
8	MF	Dejan Savićević	15 September 1966 (aged 25)	27	(Federal Republic of Yugoslavia) Red Star Belgrade
9	FW	Predrag Mijatović	19 January 1969 (aged 23)	9	(Federal Republic of Yugoslavia) Partizan
10	MF	Dragan Stojković	3 March 1965 (aged 27)	41	(France) Marseille
11	MF	Siniša Mihajlović	20 February 1969 (aged 23)	4	(Federal Republic of Yugoslavia) Red Star Belgrade
12	GK	Fahrudin Omerović	26 August 1961 (aged 30)	8	(Federal Republic of Yugoslavia) Partizan
13	DF	Budimir Vujačić	6 September 1963 (aged 28)	8	(Federal Republic of Yugoslavia) Partizan
14	MF	Dejan Petković	10 September 1972 (aged 19)	0	(Federal Republic of Yugoslavia) Radnički Niš
15	DF	Gordan Petrić	30 July 1969 (aged 22)	2	(Federal Republic of Yugoslavia) Partizan
16	DF	Darko Milanič	18 December 1967 (aged 24)	5	(Federal Republic of Yugoslavia) Partizan
17	MF	Džoni Novak	4 September 1969 (aged 22)	4	(Federal Republic of Yugoslavia) Partizan
18	FW	Slobodan Krčmarević	12 June 1965 (aged 26)	0	(Federal Republic of Yugoslavia) Partizan
19	FW	Dragan Jakovljević	23 February 1962 (aged 30)	8	(Belgium) Antwerp
20	DF	Duško Radinović	8 February 1963 (aged 29)	0	(Federal Republic of Yugoslavia) Red Star Belgrade
