= Scania 100 Tournament =

1991 Scania 100 Tournament
Tournament details
- Host country: Sweden
- City: Malmö, Gothenburg, Norrköping, Solna
- Dates: 12–16 June
- Teams: 4 (from 1 confederation)
- Venue(s): 4 (in 4 host cities)

Final positions
- Champions: Italy (1st title)
- Runners-up: Soviet Union
- Third place: Sweden
- Fourth place: Denmark

Tournament statistics
- Matches played: 4
- Goals scored: 13 (3.25 per match)
- Top scorer(s): (Sweden) Tomas Brolin (3 goals)

The Scania 100 Tournament was a minor international men's football tournament organised by Swedish Football Association. It was held in Sweden, from 12 to 16 June 1991. It served both as a warm up tournament one year prior to the Euro 1992 and as a commemoration of the 100th anniversary of Scania.

== Participant teams ==
The following teams participated in the tournament.

- Sweden
- Denmark
- Italy
- Soviet Union

== Matches ==
=== Match rules ===
- 90 minutes.
- Penalty shoot-out after a draw in 90 minutes.
- Maximum of three substitutions.

=== Bracket ===
Semi-finals
12 June – Malmö
Denmark	0
Italy	2
13 June – Gothenburg
Sweden	2
Soviet Union	3

Final
16 June – Solna
Italy (p)	1 (3)
Soviet Union	1 (2)
Third place play-off
15 June – Norrköping
Sweden	4
Denmark	0

=== Semi-finals ===
12 June 1991

Denmark	0–2 (a.e.t.)	Italy
		Rizzitelli 106'; Vialli 108'

Malmö Stadion, Malmö
Attendance: 8,741
Referee: Bo Karlsson (Sweden)

13 June 1991

Sweden	2–3 (a.e.t.)	Soviet Union
Brolin 4', 114'		Yuran 69'; Kuznetsov 94'; Korneev 117'

Ullevi, Gothenburg
Attendance: 14,225
Referee: Peter Mikkelsen (Denmark)

=== Third place play-off ===
15 June 1991

Sweden	4–0	Denmark
Dahlin 42', 53'; Andersson 60' (pen.); Brolin 68'

Norrköpings Idrottspark, Norrköping
Attendance: 7,849
Referee: Aron Schmidhuber (Germany)

=== Final ===
16 June 1991

Italy	1–1 (a.e.t.)	Soviet Union
Giannini 43'		Korneev 2'
Penalties
Berti (penalty missed); Baresi (penalty scored); De Agostini (penalty scored); Vierchowod (penalty scored)	3–2	(penalty missed) Shalimov; (penalty scored) Kuznetsov; (penalty missed) Kulkov; (penalty scored) Kanchelskis; (penalty missed) Mostovoi

Råsunda Stadium, Solna
Attendance: 8,062
Referee: George Courtney (England)

GK	1	Walter Zenga		(substituted off) 46'
DF	5	Ciro Ferrara
DF	7	Pietro Vierchowod
DF	2	Franco Baresi (c)	Booked
DF	6	Paolo Maldini
MF	8	Nicola Berti
MF	14	Gianluigi Lentini
MF	10	Stefano Eranio
FW	19	Gianluca Vialli		(substituted off) 67'
FW	11	Giuseppe Giannini		(substituted off) 46'
FW	16	Roberto Mancini
Substitutes:
GK	12	Gianluca Pagliuca		(substituted in) 46'
FW	17	Ruggiero Rizzitelli		(substituted in) 67'
MF	4	Luigi De Agostini		(substituted in) 46'
Manager:
(Italy) Azeglio Vicini

GK	12	Stanislav Cherchesov
DF	2	Andrey Chernyshov (c)
DF	3	Vasili Kulkov	Booked
DF	4	Akhrik Tsveiba		(substituted off) 15'
DF	5	Dmitri Galiamin		(substituted off) 33'
MF	6	Igor Shalimov
MF	8	Andrei Kanchelskis
MF	9	Sergei Aleinikov
MF	15	Dmitri Kuznetsov
MF	16	Igor Korneev
FW	11	Sergei Yuran		(substituted off) 79'
Substitutes:
MF	18	Aleksandr Mostovoi		(substituted in) 15'
DF	19	Andrei Ivanov		(substituted in) 33'
FW	13	Oleg Sergeyev		(substituted in) 79'
Manager:
(Soviet Union) Anatoliy Byshovets

== Winners ==
Scania 100 Tournament
champions

Italy

== Goalscorers ==
3 goals

- (Sweden) Tomas Brolin

2 goals

- (Sweden) Martin Dahlin
- (Soviet Union) Igor Korneev

1 goal

- (Sweden) Kennet Andersson
- (Italy) Ruggiero Rizzitelli
- (Italy) Gianluca Vialli
- (Italy) Giuseppe Giannini
- (Soviet Union) Sergei Yuran
- (Soviet Union) Dmitri Kuznetsov
