= Gazdanov =

Gazdanov (masculine, Russian: Газданов) or Gazdanova (feminine, Russian: Газданова) is an Ossetian surname. Notable people with the surname include:

- Artur Gazdanov (born 1992), Russian football player
- Gaito Gazdanov (1903–1971), Russian editor, novelist, and writer
- Sergei Gazdanov (1969–2000), Russian football player
