= Gorkov =

Gorkov, Gor'kov, Горько́в is a Russian surname. Notable people with the surname include:

- Dmitri Gorkov (born 1964), Russian football player and coach
- Lev Gor'kov (1929–2016), Russian-American physicist
- Sergei Gorkov (born 1968), Russian banker and attorney
