= Aleksandr Kostin =

Aleksandr Kostin may refer to:

- Aleksandr Kostin (footballer)
- Aleksandr Kostin (athlete)
