= Nikolai Kalaychev =

Soviet and Russian footballer

Personal information
- Full name: Nikolai Sergeyevich Kalaychev
- Date of birth: 16 December 1956 (age 69)
- Place of birth: Kaluga, Russian SFSR
- Height: 1.85 m (6 ft 1 in)
- Position: Defender

Youth career
- Lokomotiv Kaluga

Senior career*
Years	Team	Apps	(Gls)
1973—1975	Lokomotiv Kaluga		
1975—1983	Lokomotiv Moscow	145	(5)
1983	Salute Moscow		
1984—1985	Lokomotiv Moscow		
1990–1992	FC Oka	1	(0)

International career
- USSR U21
- * Club domestic league appearances and goals

Nikolai Sergeyevich Kalaychev (Russian: Никола́й Серге́евич Кала́йчев; born on 16 December 1956) is a former Soviet football player. The elder brother of Andrey Kalaychev.

== Career ==
The first coach is Yuri Kruglov (Kaluga). In 1973 he made his first team debut at FC Lokomotiv Kaluga.

In 1975, he moved to Lokomotiv Moscow, where he became a solid player in the main team the following year. Appeared in Soviet Top League.

He ended his playing career in 1985.

In 1992, at the invitation of the coach Yevgeny Goryansky, he spent some time at the FC Oka.

He played for the USSR youth team.
