= CIS national football team =

National association football team

Commonwealth of Independent States
1992
- Association: Football Federation of the Soviet Union
- Head coach: Anatoly Byshovets
- Most caps: Dmitri Kharine (11) (Note: Includes two FIFA-sanctioned friendlies against Mexico, that were not registered with the Russian Football Federation.)
- Top scorer: Sergei Kiriakov (4)
- Home stadium: Various
- FIFA code: CIS
First colours	Second colours

First international
- United States 0–1 CIS (Miami, United States; 25 January 1992)

Last international
- Scotland 3–0 CIS (Norrköping, Sweden; 18 June 1992)

Biggest win
- El Salvador 0–3 CIS (San Salvador, El Salvador; 29 January 1992)

Biggest defeat
- Mexico 4–0 CIS (Mexico City, Mexico; 8 March 1992)

European Championship
- Appearances: 1 (first in 1992)
- Best result: Group stage (1992)

The Commonwealth of Independent States national football team (Russian: Сборная СНГ по футболу, romanized: Sbornaya SNG po futbolu) was a transitional national team of the Football Federation of the Soviet Union in 1992. It was accepted that the team would represent the Commonwealth of Independent States (CIS) that was formed as a loose union of former union republics of the Soviet Union after the union's dissolution. Of the fifteen former Soviet republics, twelve participated in the CIS team: all eleven members of the CIS plus Georgia, which at the time was outside the CIS, but not the three Baltic States (Estonia, Latvia and Lithuania).

The CIS team was created to allow the Soviet national team to participate in Euro 1992 having already secured their place in the tournament after participating in qualifying, and having done so before the Soviet Union was dissolved. The only way to preserve the spot for the post-Soviet team was to take part in the competition as a unified team.

== Situation ==
Flag used by the CIS team at Euro 1992.

As the Soviet Union formally ceased to exist on 26 December 1991, so did all its organizations including the football federation. The Association of Football Federations of CIS was formed on 11 January 1992 and was approved by FIFA two days later. Beethoven's Symphony No. 9 was adopted as its anthem. Along with the Association, national federations of its members started to form and apply for international recognition.

The CIS national football team was formed based on the Soviet Union national football team which completed its participation in the Euro 1992 in June 1992. The CIS national football team was disbanded soon thereafter, and all its results were transferred to the Russia national football team that played its first game in August 1992.

Unlike the Yugoslav national football team which was barred from competitions during that time and replaced with the team of Denmark, FIFA and UEFA chose to preserve the former Soviet Union team and admitted to their rank a transnational team for the first time in their history. UEFA was offered an additional qualifying tournament among former members of the Soviet Union, but chose not only to ignore the offer and not to impose any sanctions against the non-existent political entity discriminating in the way against other former members of the Soviet Union, but also allowed the transnational entity to the European finals over national.

The CIS national football team was coached by Anatoly Byshovets. The team failed to achieve success in the 1992 European Football Championship, finishing last in the group, but achieved two notable draws with Germany and the Netherlands, before being beaten 3–0 by Scotland in what turned out to be their last match. In addition to their three matches at Euro 1992, the team played six friendlies: two against the United States and one each against El Salvador, Israel, Spain, Denmark, and against England in Moscow, the team's only match in front of a home crowd. The CIS also played an unofficial match against Mexico, a 4–0 loss.

Following the Euros, the CIS team was dissolved. Their final record was three wins, five draws, and three defeats, including the unofficial loss to Mexico.

== European Championship record ==
UEFA European Championship record										Qualification Record					
Year	Round	Position	Pld	W	D	L	GF	GA	Squads	Pld	W	D	L	GF	GA
(France) 1960	played as Soviet Union									played as Soviet Union					
(Spain) 1964	played as Soviet Union									played as Soviet Union					
(Italy) 1968	played as Soviet Union									played as Soviet Union					
(Belgium) 1972	played as Soviet Union									played as Soviet Union					
(Socialist Federal Republic of Yugoslavia) 1976	played as Soviet Union									played as Soviet Union					
(Italy) 1980	played as Soviet Union									played as Soviet Union					
(France) 1984	played as Soviet Union									played as Soviet Union					
(West Germany) 1988	played as Soviet Union									played as Soviet Union					
(Sweden) 1992	Group stage	8th	3	0	2	1	1	4	Squad	played as Soviet Union					
Total	Group stage	8th	3	0	2	1	1	4	−	—					

== International results ==
Win Draw Loss

=== 1992 ===
25 January 1992 Friendly	United States	0–1	CIS	Miami, United States
		Report	Tsveiba 67'	Stadium: Joe Robbie Stadium; Attendance: 30,866; Referee: Raúl Domínguez (United States)

29 January 1992 Friendly	El Salvador	0–3	CIS	San Salvador, El Salvador
			Pyatnitsky 8'; Ledyakhov 22'; Kiryakov 63'	Stadium: Estadio Cuscatlán; Attendance: 10,000

2 February 1992 Friendly	United States	2–1	CIS	Pontiac, Michigan, United States
	Wynalda 4'; Balboa 75' (pen.)	Report	Sergeyev 27'	Stadium: Pontiac Silverdome; Attendance: 35,248; Referee: Jack D'Aquila (United States)

12 February 1992 Friendly	Israel	1–2	CIS	Jerusalem, Israel
	Driks 36'	Report	Pyatnitskiy 16'; Kiryakov 50'	Stadium: Itztadion Teddy; Attendance: 2,000; Referee: Fritz Kaupe (Austria)

19 February 1992 Friendly	Spain	1–1	CIS	Valencia, Spain
	Hierro 86'	Report	Kiryakov 73'	Stadium: Estadio Luis Casanova; Attendance: 10,000; Referee: Philippe Leduc (France)

29 April 1992 Friendly	CIS	2–2	England	Moscow, Russia
	Tskhadadze 44'; Kiryakov 54'	Report	Lineker 16'; Steven 73'	Stadium: Lenin Central Stadium; Attendance: 28,000; Referee: Piotr Werner (Poland)

3 June 1992 Friendly	Denmark	1–1	CIS	Brøndbyvester, Denmark
	Christensen 34'	Report	Kolyvanov 52'	Stadium: Brøndby Stadium; Attendance: 5,339; Referee: Andrew Waddell (Scotland)

12 June 1992 Euro 1992	CIS	1–1	Germany	Norrköping, Sweden
20:15	Dobrovolski 64'	Report	Häßler 90'	Stadium: Nya Parken; Attendance: 17,410; Referee: Gérard Biguet (France)

15 June 1992 Euro 1992	Netherlands	0–0	CIS	Gothenburg, Sweden
20:15		Report		Stadium: Ullevi; Attendance: 34,440; Referee: Peter Mikkelsen (Denmark)

18 June 1992 Euro 1992	Scotland	3–0	CIS	Norrköping, Sweden
20:15	McStay 4'; McClair 16'; McAllister 84'	Report		Stadium: Nya Parken; Attendance: 14,660; Referee: Kurt Röthlisberger (Switzerland)

Source: RSSSF

== Post-Soviet national federations ==
=== National federation members of the CIS association ===
Georgia was not a member of the CIS at the point at which the football team played, but would later join in 1992.

Armenia	1 January 1992	National team	U-21 team	UEFA
Azerbaijan	27 March 1992	National team	U-21 team	UEFA
Belarus	22 December 1989	National team	U-21 team	UEFA
(Georgia (country)) Georgia	15 February 1990	National team	U-21 team	UEFA
Kazakhstan	1 January 1914	National team	U-21 team	UEFA^{[1]}
Kyrgyzstan	1 January 1992	National team	U-23 team	AFC
Moldova	14 April 1990	National team	U-21 team	UEFA
Russia	1 January 1912	National team	U-21 team	UEFA
Tajikistan	1 January 1936	National team	U-23 team	AFC
Turkmenistan	1 January 1992	National team	U-23 team	AFC
Ukraine	13 December 1991	National team	U-21 team	UEFA
Uzbekistan	1 January 1946	National team	U-23 team	AFC

1. Kazakhstan were affiliated with the AFC from 1994 until 2002, when they joined UEFA.

=== National federations outside the CIS association ===
Estonia	14 December 1921	National team	U-21 team	UEFA
Latvia	1921	National team	U-21 team	UEFA
Lithuania	9 December 1922	National team	U-21 team	UEFA

== UEFA Euro 1992 squad ==
The following squad was brought to the 1992 UEFA European Football Championship hosted by Sweden:

Head coach: (Russia) Anatoliy Byshovets

No.	Pos.	Player	Date of birth (age)	Caps	Club
1	GK	(Russia) Dmitri Kharine	16 August 1968 (aged 23)	12	(Russia) CSKA Moscow
2	DF	(Russia) Andrey Chernyshov	7 January 1968 (aged 24)	23	(Russia) Spartak Moscow
3	DF	(Georgia (country)) Kakhaber Tskhadadze	7 September 1968 (aged 23)	5	(Russia) Spartak Moscow
4	DF	(Russia) Akhrik Tsveiba (Note: Tsveiba was capped once by Ukraine, in 1992. He switched allegiance to Russia in 1997, earning eight caps.)	10 September 1966 (aged 25)	22	(Ukraine) Dynamo Kyiv
5	DF	(Ukraine) Oleh Kuznetsov	22 March 1963 (aged 29)	60	(Scotland) Rangers
6	MF	(Russia) Igor Shalimov	2 February 1969 (aged 23)	23	(Italy) Foggia
7	MF	(Ukraine) Oleksiy Mykhaylychenko	30 March 1963 (aged 29)	38	(Scotland) Rangers
8	FW	(Ukraine) Andrei Kanchelskis	23 January 1969 (aged 23)	20	(England) Manchester United
9	MF	(Belarus) Sergei Aleinikov	7 November 1961 (aged 30)	75	(Italy) Lecce
10	MF	(Moldova) Igor Dobrovolski	27 August 1967 (aged 24)	26	(Switzerland) Servette
11	FW	(Ukraine) Sergei Yuran	11 June 1969 (aged 22)	13	(Portugal) Benfica
12	GK	(Russia) Stanislav Cherchesov	2 September 1963 (aged 28)	10	(Russia) Spartak Moscow
13	FW	(Russia) Sergei Kiriakov	1 January 1970 (aged 22)	8	(Russia) Dynamo Moscow
14	FW	(Ukraine) Volodymyr Lyutyi	20 April 1962 (aged 30)	5	(Germany) MSV Duisburg
15	FW	(Russia) Igor Kolyvanov	6 March 1968 (aged 24)	22	(Italy) Foggia
16	MF	(Russia) Dmitri Kuznetsov	28 August 1965 (aged 26)	17	(Spain) Espanyol
17	MF	(Russia) Igor Korneev	4 September 1967 (aged 24)	5	(Spain) Espanyol
18	DF	(Ukraine) Viktor Onopko	14 October 1969 (aged 22)	1	(Russia) Spartak Moscow
19	MF	(Russia) Igor Lediakhov	22 May 1968 (aged 24)	7	(Russia) Spartak Moscow
20	DF	(Russia) Andrei Ivanov	6 April 1967 (aged 25)	3	(Russia) Spartak Moscow

In total, the CIS squad contained seven Russians, eight Ukrainians (one born in Germany), a Georgian, a Belarusian, an Abkhazian, a Circassian, and an Ossetian. Caps included games played for the Soviet team as well as the CIS. Some players simultaneously played for other national teams such as Kakhaber Tskhadadze (Georgia) and Akhrik Tsveiba (Ukraine).

Russia qualified for the 1994 FIFA World Cup in the United States with the bulk of the Euro 1992 CIS squad but due to the incident with the Letter of fourteeners in November 1993, Igor Shalimov, Igor Dobrovolsky, Igor Kolyvanov, Sergei Kiriakov, Vasili Kulkov, and Andrei Kanchelskis were excluded from the national team. Oleg Salenko and Andrei Ivanov, who also signed the letter, eventually withdrew their signatures. Tsveiba and Chernyshov were later called to the Russia national football team.

Some players resumed their international careers with their respective individual nations; however, many preferred to play for Russia. Although almost one third of the team were from Ukraine, only two Ukrainian players (Oleh Kuznetsov and Oleksiy Mykhaylychenko) ever played for the Ukraine national football team, while another four (Akhrik Tsveiba, Andrei Kanchelskis, Sergei Yuran and Viktor Onopko) chose to play for the Russian national team.

== See also ==
- Unified Team at the Olympics, the Olympic counterpart
  - Unified Team at the 1992 Summer Olympics
  - Unified Team at the 1992 Winter Olympics
- Unified Team at the Paralympics, the Paralympic counterpart
  - Unified Team at the 1992 Summer Paralympics
  - Unified Team at the 1992 Winter Paralympics
- CIS Games
