= Andrey Pyatnitsky =

Russian footballer

Personal information
- Full name: Andrey Vladimirovich Pyatnitsky
- Date of birth: 27 September 1967 (age 59)
- Place of birth: Tashkent, Soviet Union
- Height: 1.82 m (6 ft 0 in)
- Position: Midfielder

Senior career*
Years	Team	Apps	(Gls)
1984	Start Tashkent	2	(0)
1985	Pakhtakor Tashkent	21	(0)
1986–1987	CSKA Moscow	32	(5)
1988–1991	Pakhtakor Tashkent	120	(25)
1992–1997	Spartak Moscow	100	(17)
1998	Sokol Saratov	2	(1)
Total		277	(48)

International career
1990	Soviet Union	1	(0)
1992	CIS	5	(2)
1992	Uzbekistan	2	(0)
1993–1995	Russia	10	(2)

Managerial career
- 2002–2003: FC Almaz Moscow
- 2003: Gazovik Orenburg
- 2006–2007: Vityaz Podolsk
- 2008–2012: Spartak Moscow (academy)
- 2013: Spartak Moscow (assistant)
- 2013–2014: Spartak Moscow (reserves)
- 2015–2016: FC Rosich Moskovsky (assistant)
- 2016–2018: FC Rosich Moscow
- 2019–2020: FC Khimik-Arsenal (assistant)
- 2020–2021: FC Khimik-Arsenal
- 2021: FC Khimik-Arsenal (assistant)
- 2021: FC Arsenal-2 Tula (assistant)
- 2021–2022: FC Arsenal-2 Tula
- * Club domestic league appearances and goals

Andrey Vladimirovich Pyatnitsky (Russian: Андре́й Влади́мирович Пя́тницкий; born 27 September 1967) is a football coach and a former player. Born in Uzbekistan, he played for the Soviet Union, Uzbekistan, and Russia national teams.

== Club career ==
He played for a few clubs, including Spartak Moscow and Sokol Saratov.

== International ==
In 1990, he played one match for the USSR. In 1992, he played for the CIS and then for the Uzbekistan national football team. Then he played for Russia national football team and was a participant at the 1994 FIFA World Cup.

== Career statistics ==
=== International goals (CIS) ===
No.	Date	Venue	Opponent	Score	Result	Competition
1	29 January 1992	Estadio Cuscatlán, San Salvador, El Salvador	El Salvador	1–0	3–0	Friendly match
2	12 February 1992	Teddy Stadium, Jerusalem, Israel	Israel	1–0	2–1	Friendly match

=== International goals (Russia) ===
No.	Date	Venue	Opponent	Score	Result	Competition
1	8 September 1993	Üllői úti Stadion, Budapest, Hungary	Hungary	1–0	3–1	1994 FIFA World Cup qualification
2	29 May 1994	Luzhniki Stadium, Moscow, Russia	Slovakia	1–1	2–1	Friendly match

== Honours ==
- UEFA U-21 Championship 1990 winner
- Russian Premier League champion 1992, 1993, 1994, 1996
- Russian Premier League bronze: 1995
- Soviet Cup winner: 1992
- Russian Cup winner: 1994
- Russian Cup finalist: 1996
