= Yegor Kiryakov =

Russian footballer

Personal information
- Full name: Yegor Vyacheslavovich Kiryakov
- Date of birth: 4 February 1974 (age 52)
- Place of birth: Oryol, Russian SFSR
- Height: 1.76 m (5 ft 9 1/2 in)
- Positions: Midfielder; striker

Senior career*
Years	Team	Apps	(Gls)
1991	FC Spartak Oryol	3	(0)
1992	FC Dynamo Moscow	1	(0)
1992–1994	FC Dynamo-d Moscow	102	(12)
1995	FC Chernomorets Novorossiysk	7	(0)
1996	FC Kuban Krasnodar	22	(0)
1997–2002	FC Oryol	194	(29)
Total		329	(41)
- * Club domestic league appearances and goals

Yegor Vyacheslavovich Kiryakov (Russian: Егор Вячеславович Кирьяков; born 4 February 1974) is a former Russian professional footballer.

== Club career ==
He made his professional debut in the Soviet Second League B in 1991 for FC Spartak Oryol.

== Personal life ==
He is the younger brother of Sergei Kiriakov.

== Honours ==
- Russian Premier League bronze: 1992.
