= Sergei Kiriakov =

Russian footballer and coach

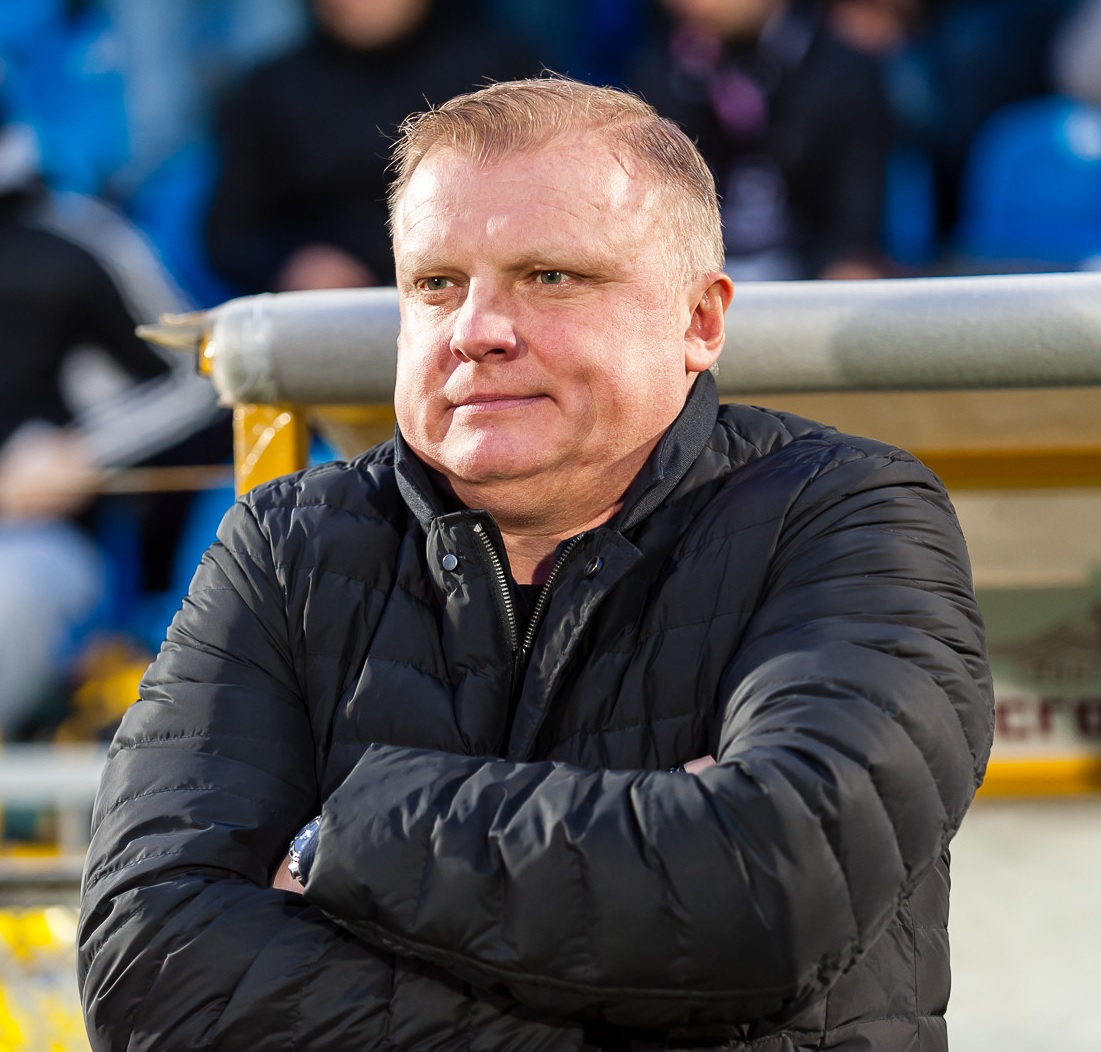
- Managing Arsenal Tula in 2016

Personal information
- Full name: Sergei Vyacheslavovich Kiriakov
- Date of birth: 1 January 1970 (age 56)
- Place of birth: Oryol, Russian SSR, Soviet Union
- Height: 1.78 m (5 ft 10 in)
- Positions: Winger; striker

Youth career
- –1983: Spartak Oryol
- 1983–1986: FShM Moscow

Senior career*
Years	Team	Apps	(Gls)
1987–1992	Dynamo Moscow	91	(9)
1992–1998	Karlsruher SC	145	(29)
1998–1999	Hamburger SV	29	(5)
1999–2000	Tennis Borussia Berlin	28	(3)
2001–2002	Yunnan Hongta	47	(18)
2003	Shandong Luneng	20	(8)
Total		360	(72)

International career
1989	USSR	1	(1)
1992	CIS	9	(4)
1992–1998	Russia	28	(10)

Managerial career
- 2006: FK Ditton
- 2008: FC Oryol
- 2009–2012: Russia U21 (assistant)
- 2012–2016: Russia U17
- 2016–2017: FC Arsenal Tula
- 2021–2024: FC Leningradets Leningrad Oblast
- * Club domestic league appearances and goals

Sergei Vyacheslavovich Kiriakov (Russian: Серге́й Вячеславович Кирьяков; born 1 January 1970) is a Russian football coach and a former player.

== Career ==
Kiriakov was born in Oryol. He played as a forward for a few clubs, including FC Dynamo Moscow, Karlsruher SC, Hamburger SV, Tennis Borussia Berlin and Yunnan Hongta.

Kiryakov played for the Russia national football team and was a participant at UEFA Euro 1992 and UEFA Euro 1996.

Kiriakov, along with Igor Dobrovolski and Igor Kolyvanov, are the only players to have scored goals for the USSR, the CIS and Russia.

His younger brother Yegor Kiryakov also played football professionally.

== Career statistics ==
Appearances and goals by club, season and competition
Club	Season	League		
Club	Season	Division	Apps	Goals
Dynamo Moscow	1987	Soviet Top League	7	1
Dynamo Moscow	1988	Soviet Top League	9	0
Dynamo Moscow	1989	Soviet Top League	20	1
Dynamo Moscow	1990	Soviet Top League	22	3
Dynamo Moscow	1991	Soviet Top League	25	3
Dynamo Moscow	1992	Russian Top League	8	1
Karlsruher SC	1992–93	Bundesliga	29	11
Karlsruher SC	1993–94	Bundesliga	32	9
Karlsruher SC	1994–95	Bundesliga	31	2
Karlsruher SC	1995–96	Bundesliga	29	4
Karlsruher SC	1996–97	Bundesliga	19	3
Karlsruher SC	1997–98	Bundesliga	5	0
Hamburger SV	1998–99	Bundesliga	29	5
Tennis Borussia Berlin	1999–2000	2. Bundesliga	28	3

== Honours ==
=== Player ===
==== International ====
USSR U18

- European under-19 champion: 1988

USSR U21

- European under-21 champion: 1990

Russia

- Legends Cup: 2009

=== Manager ===
Leningradets Leningrad Oblast

- Russian Second League zone champions (promotion): 2022–23.
