= Ali Alchagirov =

Russian footballer and coach

Personal information
- Full name: Ali Magomedovich Alchagirov
- Date of birth: 29 June 1966 (age 60)
- Place of birth: Nalchik, Russian SFSR
- Height: 1.85 m (6 ft 1 in)
- Positions: Midfielder; defender

Senior career*
Years	Team	Apps	(Gls)
1982–1984	Spartak Nalchik	36	(1)
1985–1986	LHMPS		
1987–1988	Spartak Nalchik	44	(6)
1988	Spartak Moscow	0	(0)
1989–1990	Dinamo Minsk	22	(1)
1991–1995	Spartak Vladikavkaz	103	(2)
1996–1999	Spartak Nalchik	117	(24)
2000–2001	Alania Vladikavkaz	50	(0)
2002	Spartak Nalchik	25	(1)
Total		297	(35)

Managerial career
- 2006: Spartak Nalchik (assistant)
- * Club domestic league appearances and goals

Ali Magomedovich Alchagirov (Russian: Али Магомедович Алчагиров; born 29 June 1966) is a Russian professional football coach and former player. He made his professional debut in the Soviet Second League in 1982 for PFC Spartak Nalchik.

== Honours ==
- Russian Premier League champion: 1995.
- Russian Premier League runner-up: 1992.

== European club competitions ==
With FC Alania Vladikavkaz.

- UEFA Cup 1993–94: 2 games.
- UEFA Cup 2000–01: 1 game.
