= Sergey Borisov (footballer, born 1972) =

Russian footballer

Personal information
- Full name: Sergey Anatolyevich Borisov
- Date of birth: 10 October 1972 (age 54)
- Place of birth: Moscow, Russian SFSR
- Height: 1.80 m (5 ft 11 in)
- Position: Midfielder

Youth career
- SDYuShOR-2 Lyublinskogo RONO Moscow
- FC Torpedo Moscow

Senior career*
| Years | Team | Apps | (Gls) |
| 1989–1995 | FC Torpedo Moscow | 77 | (8) |
| 1992–1995 | → FC Torpedo-d | 12 | (4) |
| 1995 | FC Torpedo Arzamas | 15 | (4) |
| 1996 | FC Torpedo-Luzhniki Moscow | 10 | (1) |
| 1996 | → FC Torpedo-d Moscow | 7 | (3) |
| 1997 | FC Gazovik-Gazprom Izhevsk | 2 | (0) |
| 1998 | FC Torpedo Arzamas | 15 | (2) |
| 1998 | FC Torpedo Vladimir | 4 | (0) |
| 2000 | FC Spartak-Chukotka Moscow | 14 | (1) |
| 2000 | FC Uralmash Yekaterinburg | 4 | (0) |
- * Club domestic league appearances and goals

Sergey Anatolyevich Borisov (Russian: Серге́й Анатольевич Борисов; born 10 October 1972) is a former Russian professional footballer.

== Club career ==
He made his professional debut in the Soviet Top League in 1991 for FC Torpedo Moscow.

== Honours ==
- Soviet Top League bronze: 1991.
- Russian Cup winner: 1993.

== European club competitions ==
With FC Torpedo Moscow.

- UEFA Cup 1991–92: 2 games.
- UEFA Cup 1992–93: 1 game.
- UEFA Cup Winners' Cup 1993–94: 2 games, 1 goal.
