= Igor Dobrovolski =

Association football player (born 1967)

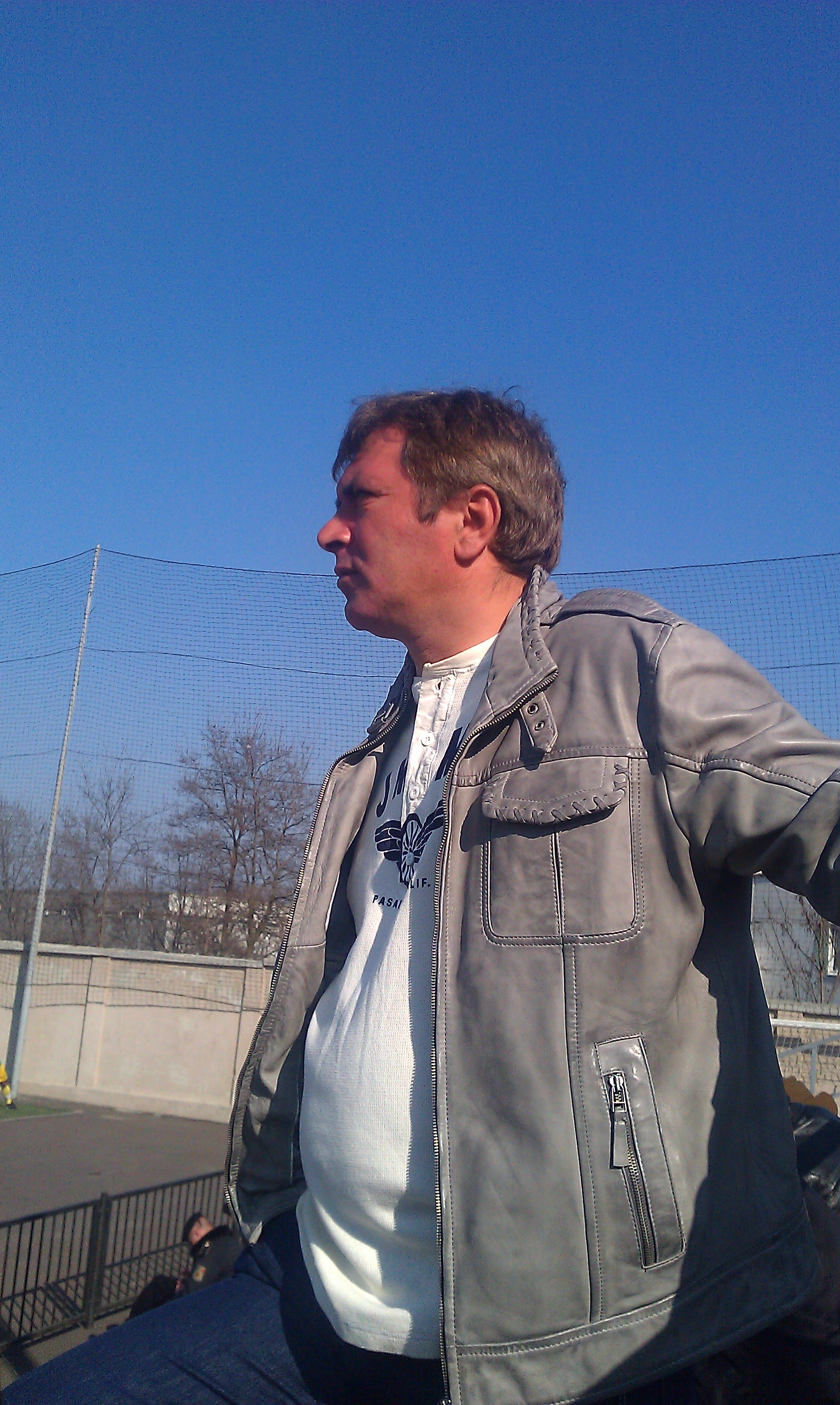
- Dobrovolski in 2011

Personal information
- Full name: Igor Ivanovich Dobrovolski
- Date of birth: 27 August 1967 (age 59)
- Place of birth: Markivka, Odesa Oblast, Ukrainian SSR, Soviet Union (now Ukraine)
- Height: 1.78 m (5 ft 10 in)
- Position: Winger

Senior career*
Years	Team	Apps	(Gls)
1984–1985	Nistru Chişinău	27	(13)
1986–1990	Dynamo Moscow	124	(27)
1990–1991	Castellón	14	(3)
1991–1992	Servette	23	(15)
1992	Genoa	4	(1)
1992–1993	Marseille	8	(1)
1993–1994	Dynamo Moscow	31	(9)
1994–1995	Atlético Madrid	22	(1)
1996–1999	Fortuna Düsseldorf	54	(14)
2004–2006	Tiligul Tiraspol	9	(1)
Total		313	(84)

International career
1986–1988	USSR (Olympic)	14	(8)
1986–1991	USSR	25	(7)
1992	CIS	4	(1)
1992–1998	Russia	18	(2)

Managerial career
- 2004–2006: Tiligul Tiraspol (player-manager)
- 2007–2009: Moldova
- 2010–2013: Dacia Chişinău
- 2013–2014: Veris Chișinău
- 2015: Sakhalin Yuzhno-Sakhalinsk
- 2015: Dacia Chişinău
- 2016–2017: Moldova
- 2018–2021: Dinamo-Auto Tiraspol
Medal record
Representing the Soviet Union
Men's football
Gold medal – first place	1988 Seoul	Team
- * Club domestic league appearances and goals

Igor Ivanovich Dobrovolski (Russian: Игорь Иванович Добровольский, Ukrainian: Ігор Іванович Добровольський, romanized: Ihor Ivanovych Dobrovolskyi; born 27 August 1967) is a Russian professional football manager and former player.

Dobrovolski started his career in the Moldavian SSR, then played in the Russian SFSR, Spain, Switzerland, Italy, France and Germany before retiring in Moldova. He is an Olympic gold medalist.

== Club career ==
Born in Markivka, Rozdilna Raion, Odesa Oblast, Ukrainian SSR, Dobrovolski trained at Tiraspol Children and Youth Sport School N4 in Moldavian SSR in early years (now in Transnistria). During his extensive career he played for Nistru Chișinău, Dynamo Moscow, Castellón, Servette, Genoa, Olympique de Marseille, Atlético Madrid, Fortuna Düsseldorf and Tiligul Tiraspol.

He is the first Russian player to win the Champions League with Olympique de Marseille in season 1992–93.

== International career ==
Dobrovolski played for three different national teams: USSR at the 1988 Olympic Games where he was a gold medal winner and finished second top goal scorer with six goals (including one in the gold medal game itself); Romário scored seven but Brazil lost in the final to USSR. He was also part, with the same team, of the 1990 FIFA World Cup, representing afterwards the CIS at UEFA Euro 1992 and Russia at Euro 1996. He scored CIS's only goal in UEFA Euro 1992, in a 1–1 draw against Germany.

Four players have had the honour of scoring at least one goal in five successive matches at the Men's Olympic Football Tournament – Igor Dobrovolski (USSR in 1988), Ottmar Hitzfeld (FR Germany in 1972), Milan Galić (Yugoslavia in 1960) and Adolfo Baloncieri (Italy in 1928). Only Dobrovolski and Galić actually claimed gold.

Dobrovolski, along with Sergei Kiriakov and Igor Kolyvanov, are the only players to have scored goals for the USSR, the CIS and Russia.

== Honours ==
Marseille

- Ligue 1: 1992–93
- UEFA Champions League: 1992–93

Soviet Union Under-21

- Olympic Gold Medal: 1988
- UEFA European Under-21 Championship: 1990

Individual

- Olympic Silver Boot: 1988 (6 goals)
- Soviet Footballer of the Year: 1990

== Coaching career ==
At 39 years old he was coaching Tiligul Tiraspol in the 2005–06 season, and then took over the Moldova national football team for the qualification to UEFA Euro 2008, with a view to a two-year extension to his contract if he was successful.

In December 2007, he signed a new contract with Moldova. He was allowed to coach any club until the start of 2010 FIFA World Cup qualification (UEFA). On 16 October 2009, Dobrovolski announced his resignation.

== International goals ==
=== Soviet Union ===
No.	Date	Venue	Opponent	Score	Result	Competition
1.	26 April 1989	Kyiv, Soviet Union	East Germany	1–0	3–0	1990 FIFA World Cup qualification
2.	31 May 1989	Moscow, Soviet Union	Iceland	1–0	1–1	1990 FIFA World Cup qualification
3.	18 June 1990	Bari, Italy	Cameroon	4–0	4–0	1990 FIFA World Cup

=== CIS ===
No.	Date	Venue	Opponent	Score	Result	Competition
1.	12 June 1992	Norrköping, Sweden	Germany	1–0	1–1	UEFA Euro 1992

=== Russia ===
No.	Date	Venue	Opponent	Score	Result	Competition
1.	23 May 1993	Moscow, Russia	Greece	1–1	1–1	1994 FIFA World Cup qualification
2.	7 June 1995	Serravalle, San Marino	San Marino	1–0	7–0	UEFA Euro 1996 qualifying

== Managerial statistics ==
As of 9 October 2017

Team	Nat	From	To	Record				
Team	Nat	From	To	G	W	D	L	Win %
Moldova	(Moldova)	2007	2009	30	7	9	14	23.33
Moldova	(Moldova)	2016	2017	16	2	4	10	12.50
