= Aleksei Selezov =

Russian former professional footballer

Personal information
- Full name: Aleksei Viktorovich Selezov
- Date of birth: 27 October 1971 (age 54)
- Place of birth: Moscow, Russian SFSR
- Height: 1.82 m (6 ft 0 in)
- Position: Defender

Senior career*
| Years | Team | Apps | (Gls) |
| 1990–1991 | FC Dynamo-2 Moscow | 55 | (5) |
| 1992–1993 | FC Dynamo Moscow | 19 | (0) |
| 1994 | FC Tekhinvest-M Moskovsky | 21 | (0) |
| 1995–1998 | FC Arsenal Tula | 94 | (3) |
| 2000 | FC Mosenergo Moscow | 23 | (0) |
| 2001–2003 | FC Arsenal Tula | 58 | (0) |
| 2004 | FC Titan Moscow | 14 | (0) |
| 2005–2006 | FC Arsenal Tula | 52 | (0) |
- * Club domestic league appearances and goals

Aleksei Viktorovich Selezov (Russian: Алексей Викторович Селезов; born 27 October 1971) is a former Russian professional footballer.

== Club career ==
He made his debut in the Russian Premier League in 1992 for FC Dynamo Moscow. He played 2 games for FC Dynamo Moscow in the UEFA Cup 1993–94.

== Honours ==
- Russian Premier League bronze: 1992, 1993.
