= 1990 UEFA European Under-21 Championship =

Tournament details
- Dates: 14 March – 17 October
- Teams: 30 (from 1 confederation)

Final positions
- Champions: Soviet Union (2nd title)
- Runners-up: Yugoslavia

Tournament statistics
- Matches played: 98
- Goals scored: 235 (2.4 per match)
- Attendance: 103,414 (1,055 per match)
- Top scorer(s): (Soviet Union) Andriy Sidelnikov (Socialist Federal Republic of Yugoslavia) Davor Šuker (3 goals each)
- Best player: (Socialist Federal Republic of Yugoslavia) Davor Šuker

The 1990 UEFA European Under-21 Championship, which spanned two years (1988–90), had 30 entrants. San Marino competed for the first time. USSR U-21s won the competition.

The 30 national teams were divided into eight groups (six groups of 4 + two groups of 3). The group winners played off against each other on a two-legged home-and-away basis until the winner was decided. There was no finals tournament or 3rd-place playoff.

== Qualifying stage ==
=== Draw ===
The allocation of teams into qualifying groups was based on that of 1990 FIFA World Cup qualification with several changes, reflecting the absence of some nations:

- Groups 1 and 2 featured the same nations
- Group 3 did not include Iceland (moved to Group 4)
- Group 4 did not include Wales, but included Iceland (moved from Group 3)
- Group 5 did not include Cyprus (moved to Group 6)
- Group 6 did not include Republic of Ireland, Northern Ireland and Malta, but included Cyprus (moved from Group 5)
- Group 7 did not include Switzerland (moved to Group 8)
- Group 8 composed of Switzerland (moved from Group 7), Italy and San Marino (both of whom did not participate in World Cup qualification)

| Qualifying Group 1 | | P | W | D | L | F | A | Pts |
|---|---|---|---|---|---|---|---|---|
| **1** | **Bulgaria** | 6 | 5 | 0 | 1 | 16 | 4 | 10 |
| **2** | Romania | 6 | 3 | 0 | 3 | 8 | 7 | 6 |
| **3** | Denmark | 6 | 2 | 1 | 3 | 9 | 14 | 5 |
| **4** | Greece | 6 | 1 | 1 | 4 | 3 | 11 | 3 |

- Bulgaria 2–1 Romania
- Greece 2–2 Denmark
- Romania 2–0 Greece
- Denmark 1–3 Bulgaria
- Bulgaria 6–0 Denmark
- Greece 1–0 Romania
- Romania 2–1 Bulgaria
- Denmark 3–0 Greece
- Bulgaria 2–0 Greece
- Denmark 1–2 Romania
- Romania 1–2 Denmark
- Greece 0–2 Bulgaria

Bulgaria qualify as group winners

| Qualifying Group 2 | | P | W | D | L | F | A | Pts |
|---|---|---|---|---|---|---|---|---|
| **1** | **Sweden** | 6 | 4 | 2 | 0 | 10 | 2 | 10 |
| **2** | England | 6 | 4 | 1 | 1 | 10 | 5 | 9 |
| **3** | Poland | 6 | 1 | 2 | 3 | 4 | 10 | 4 |
| **4** | Albania | 6 | 0 | 1 | 5 | 1 | 8 | 1 |

- Poland 0–0 Albania
- England 1–1 Sweden
- Albania 0–2 Sweden
- Albania 1–2 England
- England 2–0 Albania
- Sweden 4–0 Poland
- England 2–1 Poland
- Sweden 1–0 England
- Sweden 1–0 Albania
- Poland 1–3 England
- Poland 1–1 Sweden
- Albania 0–1 Poland

Sweden qualify as group winners

| Qualifying Group 3 | | P | W | D | L | F | A | Pts |
|---|---|---|---|---|---|---|---|---|
| **1** | **Soviet Union** | 6 | 4 | 1 | 1 | 12 | 5 | 9 |
| **2** | East Germany | 6 | 3 | 1 | 2 | 8 | 6 | 7 |
| **3** | Austria | 6 | 1 | 2 | 3 | 6 | 8 | 4 |
| **4** | Turkey | 6 | 1 | 2 | 3 | 4 | 11 | 4 |

- Soviet Union 2–2 Austria
- Austria 3–0 Turkey
- Turkey 3–2 East Germany
- East Germany 0–0 Turkey
- Soviet Union 1–0 East Germany
- Turkey 0–3 Soviet Union
- East Germany 2–0 Austria
- Austria 0–2 Soviet Union
- East Germany 3–2 Soviet Union
- Turkey 1–1 Austria
- Soviet Union 2–0 Turkey
- Austria 0–1 East Germany

Soviet Union qualify as group winners

| Qualifying Group 4 | | P | W | D | L | F | A | Pts |
|---|---|---|---|---|---|---|---|---|
| **1** | **West Germany** | 6 | 4 | 2 | 0 | 10 | 2 | 10 |
| **2** | Iceland | 6 | 2 | 3 | 1 | 11 | 7 | 7 |
| **3** | Netherlands | 6 | 1 | 2 | 3 | 6 | 9 | 4 |
| **4** | Finland | 6 | 1 | 1 | 4 | 4 | 13 | 3 |

- Finland 0–3 West Germany
- Iceland 1–1 Netherlands
- Finland 2–1 Iceland
- West Germany 2–0 Netherlands
- Netherlands 0–1 West Germany
- Finland 1–1 Netherlands
- Iceland 1–1 West Germany
- Iceland 4–0 Finland
- West Germany 2–0 Finland
- Netherlands 2–3 Iceland
- West Germany 1–1 Iceland
- Netherlands 2–1 Finland

West Germany qualify as group winners

| Qualifying Group 5 | | P | W | D | L | F | A | Pts |
|---|---|---|---|---|---|---|---|---|
| **1** | **Yugoslavia** | 6 | 4 | 1 | 1 | 10 | 4 | 9 |
| **2** | France | 6 | 3 | 2 | 1 | 11 | 7 | 8 |
| **3** | Norway | 6 | 1 | 2 | 3 | 3 | 7 | 4 |
| **4** | Scotland | 6 | 1 | 1 | 4 | 7 | 13 | 3 |

- Norway 1–1 Scotland
- France 2–0 Norway
- Scotland 0–2 Yugoslavia
- Yugoslavia 2–2 France
- Scotland 2–3 France
- France 0–1 Yugoslavia
- Norway 0–1 Yugoslavia
- Yugoslavia 4–1 Scotland
- Norway 1–1 France
- Yugoslavia 0–1 Norway
- France 3–1 Scotland
- Scotland 2–0 Norway

Yugoslavia qualify as group winners

| Qualifying Group 6 | | P | W | D | L | F | A | Pts |
|---|---|---|---|---|---|---|---|---|
| **1** | **Spain** | 4 | 3 | 0 | 1 | 3 | 1 | 6 |
| **2** | Hungary | 4 | 2 | 1 | 1 | 2 | 1 | 5 |
| **3** | Cyprus | 4 | 0 | 1 | 3 | 0 | 3 | 1 |

- Cyprus 0–0 Hungary
- Cyprus 0–1 Spain
- Hungary 1–0 Cyprus
- Spain 1–0 Cyprus
- Hungary 1–0 Spain
- Spain 1–0 Hungary

Spain qualify as group winners

| Qualifying Group 7 | | P | W | D | L | F | A | Pts |
|---|---|---|---|---|---|---|---|---|
| **1** | **Czechoslovakia** | 6 | 3 | 2 | 1 | 10 | 5 | 8 |
| **2** | Belgium | 6 | 2 | 4 | 0 | 7 | 3 | 8 |
| **3** | Portugal | 6 | 2 | 2 | 2 | 6 | 6 | 6 |
| **4** | Luxembourg | 6 | 0 | 2 | 4 | 1 | 10 | 2 |

- Czechoslovakia 0–3 Belgium
- Portugal 1–1 Belgium
- Czechoslovakia 4–0 Luxembourg
- Portugal 1–0 Luxembourg
- Belgium 1–1 Czechoslovakia
- Luxembourg 0–0 Belgium
- Belgium 1–1 Portugal
- Czechoslovakia 1–0 Portugal
- Luxembourg 0–3 Portugal
- Belgium 1–0 Luxembourg
- Portugal 0–3 Czechoslovakia
- Luxembourg 1–1 Czechoslovakia

Czechoslovakia qualify as group winners

| Qualifying Group 8 | | P | W | D | L | F | A | Pts |
|---|---|---|---|---|---|---|---|---|
| **1** | **Italy** | 4 | 3 | 1 | 0 | 5 | 0 | 7 |
| **2** | Switzerland | 4 | 2 | 1 | 1 | 8 | 1 | 5 |
| **3** | San Marino | 4 | 0 | 0 | 4 | 0 | 12 | 0 |

- Switzerland 0–0 Italy
- San Marino 0–5 Switzerland
- San Marino 0–2 Italy
- Italy 1–0 Switzerland
- Switzerland 3–0 San Marino
- Italy 2–0 San Marino

Italy qualify as group winners

=== Qualified teams ===
| Country | Qualified as | Previous appearances in tournament^{1} |
|---|---|---|
| Bulgaria | Group 1 winner | 1 (1978) |
| Sweden | Group 2 winner | 1 (1986) |
| Soviet Union | Group 3 winner | 2 (**1980**, 1982) |
| Germany | Group 4 winner | 1 (1982) |
| Yugoslavia | Group 5 winner | 3 (1978, 1980, 1984) |
| Spain | Group 6 winner | 4 (1982, 1984, **1986**, 1988) |
| Czechoslovakia | Group 7 winner | 3 (1978, 1980, 1988) |
| Italy | Group 8 winner | 6 (1978, 1980, 1982, 1984, 1986, 1988) |

^{1} Bold indicates champion for that year

== Knockout stage ==
Quarter-finals
Italy | 3 | 0 | 3
Spain | 1 | 1 | 2
Yugoslavia | 2 | 1 | 3
Bulgaria | 0 | 0 | 0
Soviet Union (a.e.t.) | 1 | 2 | 3
West Germany | 1 | 1 | 2
Czechoslovakia | 1 | 0 | 1
Sweden | 2 | 4 | 6

Semi-finals
Italy | 0 | 2 | 2
Yugoslavia (a) | 0 | 2 | 2
Soviet Union | 1 | 2 | 3
Sweden | 1 | 0 | 1

Finals
Yugoslavia | 2 | 1 | 3
Soviet Union | 4 | 3 | 7

=== Quarter-finals ===
==== First leg ====
14 March 1990

| Italy | 3–1 | Spain |
|---|---|---|
| Stroppa 3', 76'; Casiraghi 54' | Report | Hierro 88' (pen.) |

Stadio Dorico, Ancona
Attendance: 8,607
Referee: William Syme (Scotland)

14 March 1990

| Yugoslavia (Socialist Federal Republic of Yugoslavia) | 2–0 | Bulgaria |
|---|---|---|
| Prosinečki 32'; Bokšić 79' | Report |

Stadion Maksimir, Zagreb
Attendance: 8,606
Referee: Bruno Galler (Switzerland)

14 March 1990

| Soviet Union | 1–1 | West Germany |
|---|---|---|
| Shalimov 66' | Report | Bal 9' (o.g.) |

Lokomotiv Stadium, Simferopol
Attendance: 7,000
Referee: Kaj Natri (Finland)

14 March 1990

| Czechoslovakia | 1–2 | Sweden |
|---|---|---|
| Siegl 57' | Report | Brolin 52'; Jansson 87' |

Ďolíček, Prague
Attendance: 1,100
Referee: Gerasimos Germanakos (Greece)

==== Second leg ====
28 March 1990

| Spain | 1–0 | Italy |
|---|---|---|
| Mendiguren 77' | Report |

Estadio Las Gaunas, Logroño
Attendance: 13,620
Referee: Ignatius van Swieten (Netherlands)

28 March 1990

| Bulgaria | 0–1 | (Socialist Federal Republic of Yugoslavia) Yugoslavia |
|---|---|---|
| | Report | Šuker 13' |

Narodna Armia Stadium, Sofia
Attendance: 7,000
Referee: Manfred Roßner (West Germany)

28 March 1990

| West Germany | 1–2 (a.e.t.) | Soviet Union |
|---|---|---|
| Hochstätter 37' | Report | Chugunov 67'; Sydelnykov 115' |

Rosenaustadion, Augsburg
Attendance: 8,325
Referee: Einar Halle (Norway)

28 March 1990

| Sweden | 4–0 | Czechoslovakia |
|---|---|---|
| Andersson 45'; Rehn 62'; Brolin 77'; Jansson 87' | Report |

Värendsvallen, Växjö
Attendance: 2,750
Referee: John Spillane (Republic of Ireland)

=== Semi-finals ===
==== First leg ====
25 April 1990

| Yugoslavia (Socialist Federal Republic of Yugoslavia) | 0–0 | Italy |
|---|---|---|
| | Report |

Stadion Maksimir, Zagreb
Attendance: 9,417
Referee: Werner Föckler (West Germany)

25 April 1990

| Sweden | 1–1 | Soviet Union |
|---|---|---|
| Andersson 70' | Report | Shalimov 72' (pen.) |

Värendsvallen, Växjö
Attendance: 2,446
Referee: Guy Goethals (Belgium)

==== Second leg ====
9 May 1990

| Italy | 2–2 | (Socialist Federal Republic of Yugoslavia) Yugoslavia |
|---|---|---|
| Simone 24'; Đukić 58' (o.g.) | Report | Šuker 17'; Boban 61' |

Ennio Tardini, Parma
Attendance: 6,443
Referee: Heinz Holzmann (Austria)

9 May 1990

| Soviet Union | 2–0 | Sweden |
|---|---|---|
| Kolyvanov 27'; Kiryakov 47' | Report |

Lokomotiv Stadium, Simferopol
Attendance: 5,100
Referee: Gérard Biguet (France)

=== Final ===
==== First leg ====
5 September 1990

| Yugoslavia (Socialist Federal Republic of Yugoslavia) | 2–4 | Soviet Union |
|---|---|---|
| Šuker 21'; Jarni 64' | Report | Sydelnykov 9', 49'; Chernyshov 42'; Dobrovolskiy 84' |

Koševo Stadium, Sarajevo
Attendance: 6,000
Referee: Gérard Biguet (France)

==== Second leg ====
17 October 1990

| Soviet Union | 3–1 | (Socialist Federal Republic of Yugoslavia) Yugoslavia |
|---|---|---|
| Dobrovolskiy 10'; Mostovoi 46'; Kanchelskis 76' | Report | Bokšić 80' |

Lokomotiv Stadium, Simferopol
Attendance: 17,000
Referee: Pietro D'Elia (Italy)

== Goalscorers ==
3 goals

- (Socialist Federal Republic of Yugoslavia) Davor Šuker
- (Soviet Union) Andriy Sydelnykov

2 goals

- (Italy) Giovanni Stroppa
- (Sweden) Kennet Andersson
- (Sweden) Tomas Brolin
- (Sweden) Ulrik Jansson
- (Soviet Union) Igor Shalimov
- (Soviet Union) Igor Dobrovolskiy
- (Socialist Federal Republic of Yugoslavia) Alen Bokšić

1 goal

- (Czech Republic) Horst Siegl
- (Germany) Christian Hochstätter
- (Italy) Pierluigi Casiraghi
- (Italy) Marco Simone
- (Spain) Fernando Hierro
- (Spain) Ricardo Mendiguren
- (Sweden) Stefan Rehn
- (Soviet Union) Dmitriy Chugunov
- (Soviet Union) Igor Kolyvanov
- (Soviet Union) Andrey Kanchelskis
- (Soviet Union) Sergey Kiryakov
- (Soviet Union) Aleksandr Mostovoi
- (Socialist Federal Republic of Yugoslavia) Zvonimir Boban
- (Socialist Federal Republic of Yugoslavia) Robert Jarni
- (Socialist Federal Republic of Yugoslavia) Robert Prosinečki

Own goal

- (Soviet Union) Andriy Bal (playing against West Germany)
- (Socialist Federal Republic of Yugoslavia) Miroslav Đukić (playing against Italy)
