= Aleksei Kosolapov =

Russian-Kazakhstani footballer

Aleksei Kosolapov Алексей Косолапов
Personal information
- Full name: Aleksei Viktorovich Kosolapov
- Date of birth: 17 March 1971 (age 55)
- Place of birth: Pushkino, Russian SFSR
- Height: 1.74 m (5 ft 8 1/2 in)
- Positions: Defender; midfielder

Team information
- Current team: FC Sakhalin Yuzhno-Sakhalinsk (assistant coach)

Youth career
- FC Spartak Moscow

Senior career*
Years	Team	Apps	(Gls)
1988–1989	FC Spartak Moscow	0	(0)
1989	RShVSM-RAF Jelgava	22	(5)
1990	FC Spartak Moscow	0	(0)
1990–1991	RShVSM-RAF Jelgava	72	(29)
1992	FC Spartak Moscow	1	(0)
1992	Dinamo-Gazovik Tyumen	13	(0)
1993–1997	FC Lokomotiv Moscow	146	(38)
1997–1998	Sporting de Gijón	6	(1)
1998	FC Lokomotiv Moscow	10	(2)
1998–2000	Maccabi Tel Aviv F.C.	54	(7)
2001	FC Lokomotiv Moscow	0	(0)
2001–2002	FC Sokol-Saratov	11	(0)
2002	FC Terek Grozny	11	(1)
2003–2004	FC Tobol	62	(16)
2005	Zhenis Astana	25	(1)
2006–2008	FC Aktobe	50	(4)

International career
1993–1997	Russia	8	(1)

Managerial career
- 2007–2009: FC Aktobe (assistant)
- 2010–2011: FC Aktobe (scout)
- 2010: FC Lokomotiv Moscow (academy)
- 2012–2014: FC Aktobe (assistant)
- 2014–2015: FC Aktobe (scout)
- 2015: FC Aktobe (caretaker)
- 2015–2016: FC Aktobe (assistant)
- 2016–2017: FC Aktobe (U-21)
- 2017–2018: FC Aktobe (conditioning)
- 2020: SDYuSShOR-8 Nursultan (assistant)
- 2021: FC Aktobe-Zhas
- 2022: FC Aqtobe City
- 2022–2023: FC Sakhalinets Moscow (assistant)
- 2023–: FC Sakhalin Yuzhno-Sakhalinsk (assistant)
- * Club domestic league appearances and goals

Aleksei Viktorovich Kosolapov (Russian: Алексей Викторович Косолапов; born 17 March 1971) is a Russian-Kazakhstani football coach and a former player. He works as an assistant coach with FC Sakhalin Yuzhno-Sakhalinsk.

== Honours ==
- Russian Premier League runner-up: 1995.
- Russian Premier League bronze: 1994, 1998.
- Russian Cup winner: 1996, 1997.
- Russian Cup runner-up: 1998.
- Liga Leumit (top division) runner-up: 1999.
- Kazakhstan Premier League winner: 2007, 2008
- Kazakhstan Premier League runner-up: 2003.
- Kazakhstan Cup winner: 2005, 2008
- Kazakhstan Super Cup winner: 2008
- Top 33 players year-end list: 1993, 1994, 1995, 1997.

== International career ==
Kosolapov made his debut for Russia on 6 October 1993 in a friendly against Saudi Arabia. He played for Russia in two more friendlies in 1994 and several 1998 FIFA World Cup qualifiers in 1997 (but not in the knockout qualification games against Italy). He scored his only international goal against Israel in a qualifier in June 1997.

=== International goal ===
Scores and results list Russia's goal tally first.

No	Date	Venue	Opponent	Score	Result	Competition
1.	8 June 1997	Dynamo Stadium, Moscow, Russia	Israel	2–0	2–0	1998 World Cup qualifier
