= Dmitry Gorkov =

Russian footballer

Personal information
- Full name: Dmitry Anatolyevich Gorkov
- Date of birth: 24 October 1964 (age 62)
- Place of birth: Moscow, Russian SFSR
- Height: 1.76 m (5 ft 9 in)
- Position: Midfielder

Youth career
- FC Lokomotiv Moscow

Senior career*
Years	Team	Apps	(Gls)
1983–1984	FC Lokomotiv Moscow	10	(1)
1985–1986	SK FShM Moscow	52	(4)
1987–1993	FC Lokomotiv Moscow	158	(17)
1994	Étoile Sahel	29	(2)
1994	FC Lokomotiv Moscow	2	(1)
1995–1997	FC Gazovik-Gazprom Izhevsk	107	(10)
1998	FC Kuzbass Kemerovo	10	(1)

Managerial career
- 1999: FC Khimki (assistant)
- 2001: FC Titan Reutov (assistant)
- 2002: FC Titan Reutov (director)
- 2003: FC Uralan Plus Moscow (director)
- 2005: FC Presnya Moscow
- 2006: FC Presnya Moscow (assistant)
- 2010: FC Lokomotiv-2 Moscow (youth team coach)
- 2011–2012: FC Lokomotiv Moscow (youth team coach)
- 2014–2015: FC Khimki (assistant)
- * Club domestic league appearances and goals

Dmitry Anatolyevich Gorkov (Russian: Дмитрий Анатольевич Горьков; born 24 October 1964) is a Russian professional football coach and a former player.

== Club career ==
He made his professional debut in the Soviet First League in 1984 for FC Lokomotiv Moscow. He played 2 games in the UEFA Cup 1993–94 for FC Lokomotiv Moscow.

== Honours ==
- Soviet Cup finalist: 1990.
- Russian Premier League bronze: 1994.
