= Viktor Onopko =

Russian footballer (born 1969)

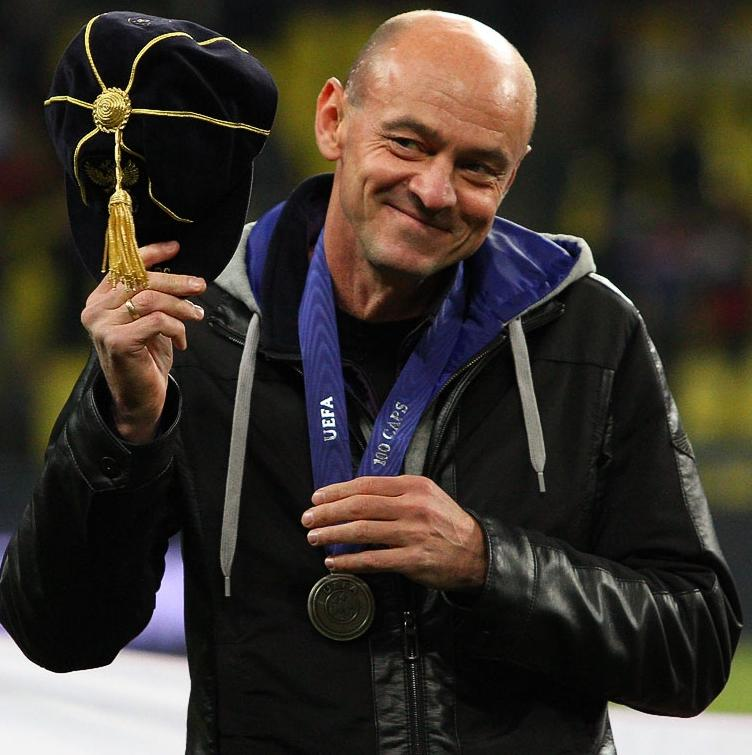
- Onopko in 2011

Personal information
- Full name: Viktor Savelyevich Onopko
- Date of birth: 14 October 1969 (age 57)
- Place of birth: Lugansk, Ukrainian SSR, Soviet Union
- Height: 1.89 m (6 ft 2 in)
- Position: Defender

Team information
- Current team: Rostov, Russia (assistant coach)

Senior career*
Years	Team	Apps	(Gls)
1986	Stakhanovets Stakhanov	4	(0)
1986–1988	Shakhtar Donetsk	3	(0)
1989	Dynamo Kyiv	0	(0)
1990–1991	Shakhtar Donetsk	45	(4)
1992–1995	Spartak Moscow	108	(23)
1995–2002	Real Oviedo	216	(7)
2002–2003	Rayo Vallecano	28	(1)
2003–2004	Alania Vladikavkaz	7	(0)
2004–2005	Saturn	51	(1)
Total		462	(33)

International career
1991	USSR U-21	1	(0)
1992	CIS	4	(0)
1992–2004	Russia	109	(7)

Managerial career
- 2009–2020: CSKA Moscow (assistant)
- 2021–: Russia (assistant)
- 2022–: Rostov (assistant)
- * Club domestic league appearances and goals

Viktor Savelyevich Onopko (Russian: Виктор Савельевич Онопко; born 14 October 1969) is a Russian former football defender. He is the assistant manager of both FC Rostov in the Russian Premier League and the Russia national team.

As a player, Onopko held the record for most international appearances for the Russia national team until 2015.

== Club career ==
Onopko's career as a player started in 1986. During that time, he played for Shakhtar Donetsk, Spartak Moscow, Real Oviedo, Rayo Vallecano, Alania Vladikavkaz and Saturn Ramenskoye. He retired as a player in 2005.

== International career ==
Eligible to play for both the Ukrainian and Russian national teams, Onopko chose the latter (unlike his brother Sergey, who opted to play for Ukraine). He amassed 109 caps (plus 4 for the CIS, including in the 1992 Euros). He played in the 1994 and 2002 world cups, as well as 1996 Euros. Onopko was in the preliminary squad for Euro 2004 but was dropped due to injury. With the national team, in 2003 he won the Cyprus friendly tournament

After retiring, in 2009, he was part of the Russia squad that won the 2009 Legends Cup.

== Coaching career ==
Onopko worked for 11 years as an assistant coach for CSKA Moscow.

On 26 July 2021, he was hired as an assistant to Valeri Karpin in the Russia national team.

In February 2022, after FIFA and UEFA suspended Russian clubs and the national teams from international competitions amidst the Russian invasion of Ukraine, Karpin returned as manager to FC Rostov and hired Onopko as his assistant there as well.

== Personal life ==
Onopko was born in Voroshilovgrad (now called Luhansk) in the Soviet Union. Following the fall of the Soviet Union in 1991, he acquired both Ukrainian and Russian citizenships.

Viktor has a younger brother, Serhiy, who also played as a professional footballer.

== Career statistics ==
=== Club ===
Appearances and goals by club, season and competition
Club	Season	League		Cup		Europe		Total	
Club	Season	Apps	Goals	Apps	Goals	Apps	Goals	Apps	Goals
Stakhanovets Stakhanov	1986	4	0	0	0	—		4	0
Shakhtar Donetsk	1986	0	0	0	0	—		0	0
Shakhtar Donetsk	1987	0	0	0	0	—		0	0
Shakhtar Donetsk	1988	3	0	1	0	—		4	0
Shakhtar Donetsk	Total	3	0	1	0	0	0	4	0
Dinamo Kyiv	1989	0	0	0	0	—		0	0
Shakhtar Donetsk	1990	21	0	3	1	—		24	1
Shakhtar Donetsk	1991	24	1	1	0	—		25	1
Shakhtar Donetsk	Total	45	1	4	1	0	0	49	2
Spartak Moscow	1992	23	6	2	1	7	1	32	8
Spartak Moscow	1993	30	9	4	0	9	4	43	13
Spartak Moscow	1994	26	2	3	0	5	0	34	2
Spartak Moscow	1995	29	6	1	0	6	0	36	6
Spartak Moscow	Total	108	23	10	1	27	5	145	29
Real Oviedo	1995–96	19	1	—		—		19	1
Real Oviedo	1996–97	37	0	1	0	—		38	0
Real Oviedo	1997–98	31	0	—		—		31	0
Real Oviedo	1998–99	33	0	2	0	—		35	0
Real Oviedo	1999-00	31	2	1	0	—		32	2
Real Oviedo	2000–01	35	3	1	0	—		36	3
Real Oviedo	2001–02	30	1	—		—		30	1
Real Oviedo	Total	216	7	5	0	0	0	221	7
Rayo Vallecano	2002–03	28	1	1	0	—		29	1
Alania Vladikavkaz	2003	7	0	1	0	—		8	0
Saturn Ramenskoye	2004	26	1	5	0	—		31	1
Saturn Ramenskoye	2005	25	0	2	0	—		27	0
Saturn Ramenskoye	Total	51	1	7	0	0	0	58	1
Career total		458	33	29	2	27	5	514	40

== International goals ==
No.	Date	Venue	Opponent	Score	Result	Competition
1.	18 February 1993	Los Angeles, United States	El Salvador	1–0	2–1	Friendly
2.	11 October 1995	Moscow, Russia	Greece	2–1	2–1	UEFA Euro 1996 qualifying
3.	5 September 1998	Kyiv, Ukraine	Ukraine	2–3	2–3	UEFA Euro 2000 qualifying
4.	31 March 1999	Moscow, Russia	Andorra	3–0	6–1	UEFA Euro 2000 qualifying
5.	8 September 1999	Andorra la Vella, Andorra	Andorra	1–0	2–1	UEFA Euro 2000 qualifying
6.	8 September 1999	Andorra la Vella, Andorra	Andorra	2–1	2–1	UEFA Euro 2000 qualifying
7.	16 October 2002	Volvograd, Russia	Albania	3–1	4–1	UEFA Euro 2004 qualifying

== Honours ==
Spartak Moscow

- Russian Premier League: 1992, 1993, 1994
- Soviet Cup: 1992
- Russian Cup: 1994

Individual

- Footballer of the Year in Russia (Futbol magazine): 1992, 1993
- Footballer of the Year in Russia (Sport-Express newspaper): 1993

== See also ==
- List of men's footballers with 100 or more international caps
