= Sergei Gazdanov =

Russian footballer

Personal information
- Full name: Sergei Inalovich Gazdanov
- Date of birth: 21 August 1969
- Place of birth: Ordzhonikidze, Russian SFSR
- Date of death: 2000 (aged 31)
- Height: 1.75 m (5 ft 9 in)
- Positions: Defender; midfielder

Senior career*
Years	Team	Apps	(Gls)
1986–1987	FC Spartak Ordzhonikidze	20	(1)
1987	Sport Tallinn	6	(0)
1988	PFC CSKA-2 Moscow	32	(7)
1989–1994	FC Spartak Vladikavkaz	140	(6)
1995	FC Uralan Elista	35	(0)
1996–1998	PFC Spartak Nalchik	89	(4)
1998	FC Avtodor Vladikavkaz	16	(0)
- * Club domestic league appearances and goals

Sergei Inalovich Gazdanov (Russian: Серге́й Иналович Газданов; 21 August 1969 – 2000) was a Russian professional footballer. He made his professional debut in the Soviet First League in 1986 for FC Spartak Ordzhonikidze. He played 2 games in the UEFA Cup 1993–94 for FC Spartak Vladikavkaz.

== Honours ==
- Russian Premier League runner-up: 1992.
