= Igor Korneev =

Russian former professional footballer (born 1967)

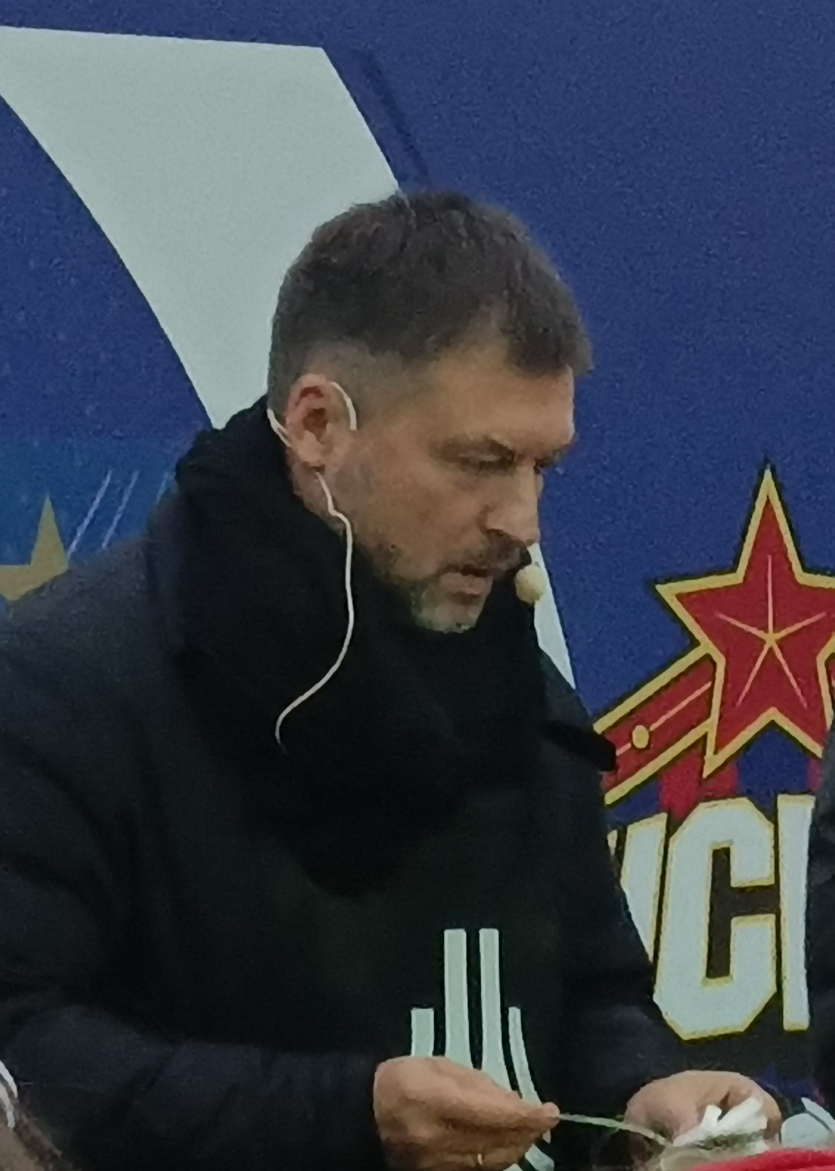
- Korneev in 2024

Personal information
- Full name: Igor Vladimirovich Korneev
- Date of birth: 4 September 1967 (age 59)
- Place of birth: Moscow, Soviet Union
- Height: 1.72 m (5 ft 8 in)
- Position: Midfielder

Youth career
- Spartak Moscow

Senior career*
Years	Team	Apps	(Gls)
1983	Krasnaya Presnya Moscow	9	(1)
1985–1991	CSKA Moscow	180	(58)
1986	→ CSKA-2 Moscow	22	(2)
1991–1994	Espanyol	73	(21)
1994	Barcelona B	14	(4)
1994–1995	Barcelona	12	(0)
1995–1997	Heerenveen	36	(7)
1997–2002	Feyenoord	79	(20)
2002–2003	NAC	10	(0)
Total		435	(113)

International career
1991	Soviet Union	5	(3)
1992	CIS	1	(0)
1993–1994	Russia	8	(0)

Managerial career
- 2004–2006: Feyenoord (youth)
- 2006–2010: Russia (assistant)
- 2009–2012: FC Zenit Saint Petersburg (sporting director)
- 2014: SK Slavia Prague (sporting director)
- 2016: FC Lokomotiv Moscow (sporting director)
- 2019–2020: Monaco (advisor of management)
- * Club domestic league appearances and goals

Igor Vladimirovich Korneev (Russian: Игорь Владимирович Корнеев; born 4 September 1967) is a Russian professional football official and a former player who played as a midfielder, notably in La Liga for RCD Espanyol and FC Barcelona.

== Club career ==
He was part of the Feyenoord squad that won the 2001–02 UEFA Cup, as an unused substitute in the final. He retired after the 2002–03 season with NAC Breda.

== International career ==
Korneev earned 14 caps for the Russia national team, scoring 3 goals. He was the part of Russia's 1994 World Cup squad.

== Career statistics ==
=== Club ===
Appearances and goals by club, season and competition
Club	Season	League		
Club	Season	Division	Apps	Goals
Krasnaya Presnya	1983	Soviet Second League	9	1
CSKA-2	1986	Soviet Second League	22	2
CSKA	1987	Soviet Top League	19	3
CSKA	1988	Soviet First League	37	13
CSKA	1989	Soviet First League	38	14
CSKA	1990	Soviet Top League	21	8
CSKA	1991	Soviet Top League	29	10
CSKA	Total		144	48
Espanyol	1991–92	La Liga	14	6
Espanyol	1992–93	La Liga	32	7
Espanyol	1993–94	Segunda División	27	8
Espanyol	Total		73	21
Barcelona B	1994–95	Segunda División	14	4
Barcelona	1994–95	La Liga	12	0
Heerenveen	1995–96	Eredivisie	11	2
Heerenveen	1996–97	Eredivisie	25	5
Heerenveen	Total		36	7
Feyenoord	1997–98	Eredivisie	20	2
Feyenoord	1998–99	Eredivisie	17	5
Feyenoord	1999–2000	Eredivisie	15	6
Feyenoord	2000–01	Eredivisie	17	6
Feyenoord	2001–02	Eredivisie	10	1
Feyenoord	Total		79	20
NAC Breda	2002–03	Eredivisie	10	0
Career total			399	103

In 1984–85 played for FC Spartak Moscow-d (reserves squad) at the Top League Youth Championship of the USSR — 31 matches, 4 goals. Also at the Top League Youth Championship in 1987 played for FC CSKA-2 Moscow-d (reserves squad) — 10 matches, 7 goals. Top League Youth Championship does not apply to the football league system.

=== International ===
Appearances and goals by national team and year
National team	Year	Apps	Goals
Soviet Union	1991	5	3
Soviet Union	Total	5	3
CIS	1992	1	0
CIS	Total	1	0
Russia	1993	4	0
Russia	1994	4	0
Russia	Total	8	0
Total		14	3

- Korneev's team's score listed first, score column indicates score after each Korneev goal.

List of international goals scored by Igor Korneev
No.	Team	Date	Venue	Opponent	Score	Result	Competition	Ref.
1	Soviet Union	29 May 1991	Luzhniki Stadium, Moscow, Soviet Union	Cyprus	3–0	4–0	UEFA Euro 1992 qualifying	
2	Soviet Union	13 June 1991	Ullevi, Gothenburg, Sweden	Sweden	3–2	3–2	Scania 100	
3	Soviet Union	16 June 1991	Råsunda Stadium, Stockholm, Sweden	Italy	1–0	1–1	Scania 100	

== Honours ==
Feyenoord

- Eredivisie: 1998–99
- UEFA Cup: 2001-02

Individual

- Footballer of the Year in Russia: 1991
