= Aleksandr Kostin (footballer) =

Russian footballer

Personal information
- Full name: Aleksandr Georgiyevich Kostin
- Date of birth: 3 September 1969 (age 57)
- Place of birth: Cherkessk, Russian SFSR
- Height: 1.74 m (5 ft 9 in)
- Positions: Midfielder; defender

Senior career*
Years	Team	Apps	(Gls)
1986	FC Nart Cherkessk	25	(0)
1987–1988	FC Dynamo Stavropol	61	(1)
1989	FC Dynamo Moscow	4	(0)
1990–1992	FC Dynamo Stavropol	87	(2)
1992	FC Baltika Kaliningrad	24	(2)
1993	FC Spartak Vladikavkaz	31	(1)
1994	PFC Spartak Nalchik	13	(0)
1995	FC Ilves	24	(2)
1996–1998	PFC Spartak Nalchik	76	(4)
- * Club domestic league appearances and goals

Aleksandr Georgiyevich Kostin (Russian: Александр Георгиевич Костин; born 3 September 1969) is a former Russian professional footballer.

== Club career ==
He made his professional debut in the Soviet Second League in 1986 for FC Nart Cherkessk. He played 2 games in the UEFA Cup 1993–94 for FC Spartak Vladikavkaz.
