= Andrei Kalaychev =

Soviet and Russian footballer

Personal information
- Full name: Andrei Sergeyevich Kalaychev
- Date of birth: 26 October 1963 (age 62)
- Place of birth: Kaluga, Russian SFSR
- Height: 1.86 m (6 ft 1 in)
- Position: Midfielder

Senior career*
Years	Team	Apps	(Gls)
1980–1982	Lokomotiv Kaluga	17	(0)
1982–1983	Lokomotiv Moscow	0	(0)
1984–1985	Iskra Smolensk	35	(1)
1986–1989	Lokomotiv Moscow	104	(6)
1990–1992	Torpedo Moscow	49	(3)
1992–1993	VfB Mödling	22	(0)
1993	Torpedo Moscow	9	(0)

International career
1989	USSR	1	(0)
- * Club domestic league appearances and goals

Andrei Sergeyevich Kalaychev (Russian: Андрей Серге́евич Калайчев; born 26 October 1963) is a retired Soviet and Russian football player.

== Honours ==
- Soviet Top League bronze: 1991.

== International career ==
Kalaychev played his only game for USSR on February 21, 1989, in a friendly against Bulgaria.
