= Andrei Ivanov (footballer, born 1967) =

Russian footballer

Personal information
- Full name: Andrei Yevgenyevich Ivanov
- Date of birth: 6 April 1967
- Place of birth: Moscow, Soviet Union
- Date of death: 19 May 2009 (aged 42)
- Place of death: Moscow, Russia
- Height: 1.93 m (6 ft 4 in)
- Position: Defender

Senior career*
Years	Team	Apps	(Gls)
1982	FShM Moscow	1	(0)
1983–1985	FC Spartak Moscow	0	(0)
1987	SKA Khabarovsk	24	(1)
1988–1990	FC Spartak Moscow	22	(0)
1990	FC Guria Lanchkhuti		
1991–1994	FC Spartak Moscow	78	(0)
1994	FC Dynamo Moscow	16	(1)
1995	FC Spartak Moscow	9	(0)
1996	PFC CSKA Moscow	23	(0)
1996–1997	FC Tirol Innsbruck	12	(0)
1997–1998	SpVgg Greuther Fürth	9	(0)
1998–1999	F.C. Alverca		
2000	FC Nika Moscow		

International career
1991	USSR	2	(0)
1992	CIS	2	(0)
1992–1993	Russia	11	(0)
- * Club domestic league appearances and goals

Andrei Yevgenyevich Ivanov (Russian: Андрей Евгеньевич Иванов; 6 April 1967 – 19 May 2009) was a Russian international footballer who played as left-back.

== Honours ==
- Soviet Top League winner: 1989
- Russian Premier League winner: 1992, 1993
- Russian Premier League runner-up: 1994
- Russian Premier League bronze: 1995
- Soviet Cup winner: 1992
- Top 33 players year-end list: 1992, 1993

== International career ==
He earned 15 caps for USSR, CIS and Russia, and was in the UEFA Euro 1992 as a member of the CIS team.

== Post career ==
After retirement, he suffered from heavy alcoholism. He died in 2009 after pneumonia.
