= Igor Shalimov =

Russian football manager (born 1969)

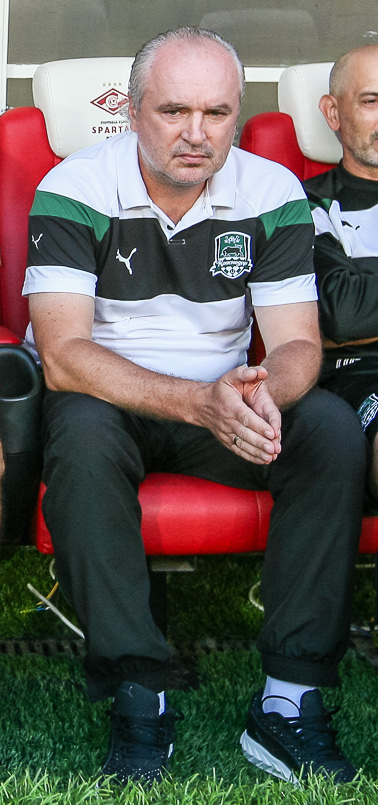
- Shalimov managing FC Krasnodar in 2016

Personal information
- Full name: Igor Mikhailovich Shalimov
- Date of birth: 2 February 1969 (age 57)
- Place of birth: Moscow, Russian SFSR, Soviet Union
- Height: 1.82 m (6 ft 0 in)
- Position: Midfielder

Youth career
- 1976–1980: Lokomotiv Moscow
- 1980–1986: Spartak Moscow

Senior career*
Years	Team	Apps	(Gls)
1986–1991	Spartak Moscow	95	(20)
1991–1992	Foggia	33	(9)
1992–1995	Inter Milan	50	(11)
1994–1995	→ MSV Duisburg (loan)	21	(0)
1995	→ Lugano (loan)	15	(3)
1995–1996	Udinese	20	(0)
1996–1998	Bologna	33	(5)
1998–1999	Napoli	19	(2)
Total		286	(50)

International career
1990–1991	USSR	20	(2)
1992	CIS	4	(0)
1992–1998	Russia	23	(3)

Managerial career
- 2001–2002: FC Krasnoznamensk
- 2003: FC Uralan Elista
- 2008–2011: Russia (women)
- 2015–2016: FC Krasnodar-2
- 2016: FC Krasnodar (assistant)
- 2016: FC Krasnodar (caretaker)
- 2016–2018: FC Krasnodar
- 2018–2019: FC Khimki
- 2019–2020: Akhmat Grozny
- 2021–2022: Ural Yekaterinburg
- 2025: Fakel Voronezh
- * Club domestic league appearances and goals

Igor Mihailovich Shalimov (Russian: Игорь Михайлович Шалимов; born 2 February 1969) is a Russian football manager and former player. During his playing career, he played as a midfielder, primarily in the wide position.

== Playing career ==
Shalimov started his playing career in Spartak Moscow. After a few seasons with Spartak Moscow he transferred to Foggia in Italy. He then transferred to Inter Milan. He has also played in the Italian Serie A for Bologna, Udinese and Napoli, as well as MSV Duisburg in Germany and FC Lugano in Switzerland.

He was a member of the USSR national team which participated in the 1990 FIFA World Cup. After the dissolution of the Soviet Union, he represented the unified CIS team at the European Championship held in Sweden. He was one of a number of players who refused to play for then-coach Pavel Sadyrin at the 1994 FIFA World Cup. Two years later, in 1996, he was a member of the Russia national team for the European Championship held in England.

Shalimov ended his playing career in Napoli after being banned for two years for testing positive for nandrolone, a banned anabolic steroid substance. He has claimed that an anabolic containing nandrolone was given to him while he was hospitalized in Moscow, to stop an internal bleeding.

== Managerial career ==
Shalimov was appointed manager of Russia women's national team in 2008, before being promoted to deputy sporting director for national teams and selection at the Russian Football Union in 2011.

He was dismissed as the manager of FC Krasnodar on 2 April 2018.

On 5 June 2018, he signed a two-year contract with FC Khimki. He left Khimki on 2 April 2019, with the team in 14th place and three points above the relegation zone.

On 30 September 2019, he was hired by Russian Premier League club Akhmat Grozny. He left Akhmat on 26 July 2020 as his contract expired.

On 10 August 2021, he was hired by Russian Premier League club Ural Yekaterinburg. Shalimov was dismissed by Ural on 8 August 2022 after losing the first 4 games in the 2022–23 Russian Premier League season.

On 2 April 2025, Shalimov signed with Fakel Voronezh, with the club in Russian Premier League relegation zone at the time. Fakel was relegated to the Russian First League at the end of the season. Shalimov left Fakel by mutual consent on 29 September 2025 after a series of three winless games, even though the club was 3rd in the Russian First League standings at the time.

== Career statistics ==
=== Club ===
Appearances and goals by club, season and competition
Club	Season	League		
Club	Season	Division	Apps	Goals
Spartak	1986	Soviet Top League	5	1
Spartak	1987	Soviet Top League	0	0
Spartak	1988	Soviet Top League	25	8
Spartak	1989	Soviet Top League	20	1
Spartak	1990	Soviet Top League	23	5
Spartak	1991	Soviet Top League	22	5
Spartak	Total		95	20
Foggia	1991–92	Serie A	33	9
Inter Milan	1992–93	Serie A	32	9
Inter Milan	1993–94	Serie A	18	2
Inter Milan	Total		50	11
MSV Duisburg (loan)	1994–95	Bundesliga	21	0
Lugano (loan)	1995–96	Swiss Super League	15	3
Udinese	1995–96	Serie A	20	0
Bologna	1996–97	Serie A	18	4
Bologna	1997–98	Serie A	15	1
Bologna	Total		33	5
Napoli	1998–99	Serie B	19	2
Career total			286	50

=== International ===
Scores and results list Soviet Union's and Russia's goal tally first, score column indicates score after each Shalimov goal.

List of international goals scored by Igor Shalimov
No.	Date	Venue	Opponent	Score	Result	Competition
Soviet Union goals
1	23 November 1990	Queen's Park Oval, Port of Spain, Trinidad and Tobago	Trinidad and Tobago	1–0	2–0	Friendly
2	25 September 1991	Lenin Central Stadium, Moscow, Russia	Hungary	1–1	2–2	UEFA Euro 1992 qualifying
Russia goals
1	14 April 1993	Stade Josy Barthel, Luxembourg, Luxembourg	Luxembourg	3–0	4–0	1994 FIFA World Cup qualification
2	7 June 1995	Stadio Olimpico, Serravalle, San Marino	San Marino	4–0	7–0	UEFA Euro 1996 qualifying
3	6 September 1995	Svangaskarð, Toftir, Faroe Islands	Faroe Islands	5–2	5–2	UEFA Euro 1996 qualifying

== Honours ==
=== Player ===
Spartak Moscow

- Soviet Top League: 1989

Inter Milan

- UEFA Cup: 1993–94

USSR U21

- UEFA European Under-21 Championship: 1990
