= Igor Kolyvanov =

Russian footballer (born 1968)

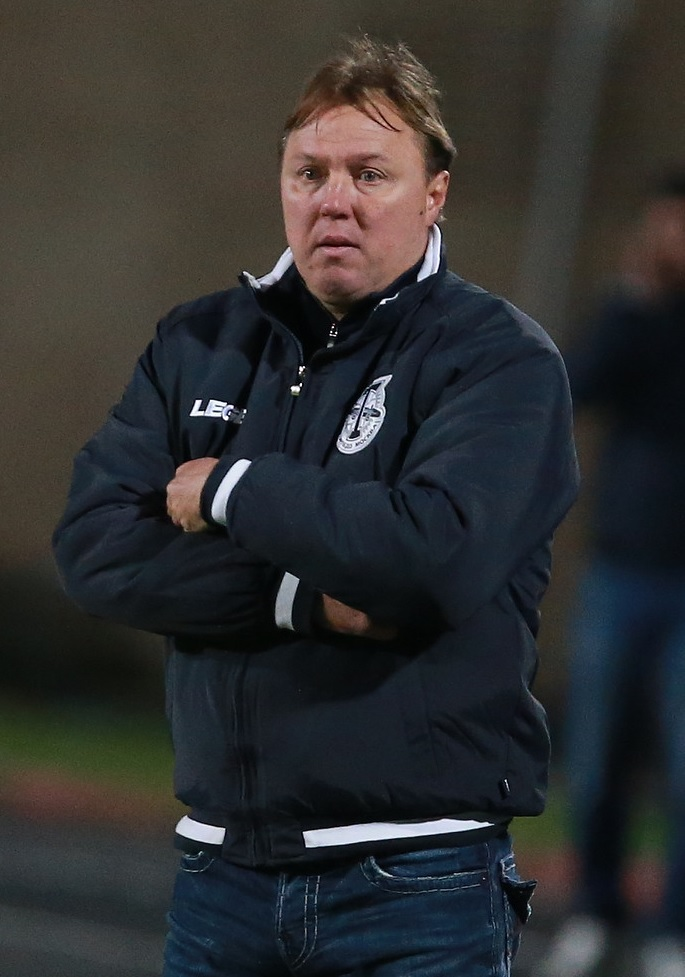
- Kolyvanov coaching Torpedo Moscow in 2017

Personal information
- Full name: Igor Vladimirovich Kolyvanov
- Date of birth: 6 March 1968 (age 58)
- Place of birth: Moscow, Russian SFSR, Soviet Union
- Height: 1.78 m (5 ft 10 in)
- Position: Striker

Team information
- Current team: Volgar Astrakhan (manager)

Youth career
- 1977–1982: Soviet Region School
- 1982–1984: FShM Moscow
- 1984–1985: Spartak Moscow Youth

Senior career*
Years	Team	Apps	(Gls)
1985	FShM Moscow	2	(0)
1985	Spartak Moscow	0	(0)
1986–1991	Dynamo Moscow	140	(42)
1991–1996	Foggia	106	(22)
1996–2001	Bologna	87	(26)
Total		337	(90)

International career
1989–1991	USSR	19	(2)
1992	CIS	5	(1)
1992–1998	Russia	35	(12)

Managerial career
- 2002–2003: Russia U19 assistant
- 2003–2006: Russia U17
- 2006–2008: Russia U19
- 2008–2010: Russia U21
- 2012–2015: Ufa
- 2017–2019: Torpedo Moscow
- 2019–2020: Ararat Yerevan
- 2022–2024: Tekstilshchik Ivanovo
- 2026–: Volgar Astrakhan
- * Club domestic league appearances and goals

Igor Vladimirovich Kolyvanov (Russian: Игорь Владимирович Колыванов; born 6 March 1968) is a Russian football manager and a former player who is the manager of Volgar Astrakhan. During his playing career, he played as a striker, accumulating 90 goals scored in 333 games at the top level in the Soviet Union as well as in Italy.

He was the head coach of the Russia U17 national team that won the UEFA U-17 Championship in 2006. During his playing career he played for Dynamo Moscow, Foggia, and Bologna, and was a regular member of the Russia national side.

== Youth ==
Born in Moscow, Soviet Union, now Russia, Kolyvanov began playing organized football at the age of 9, when he was approached by Viktor Abayev. After training with Abaev for a year with children a year older than himself, Kolyvanov moved to the youth sport school of Soviet Region in Moscow, coached by Igor Shvykov. He attributes the core development of many of his skills to this stage. At the age of 14 he moved to another youth team, called FShM Moscow, and after a two-year stint with it, he was picked up by the famous Spartak Moscow youth system. Although Spartak was one of the leading teams in the Soviet Union at that time, Kolyvanov did not see a chance in breaking into the starting line-up, and when Dynamo Moscow called him in 1986, at the age of 17, he agreed to a move.

== Playing career ==
=== Soviet Union & Russia ===
After transferring to Dynamo Moscow, Kolyvanov was injured in his very first game for the reserve team. However, after a recovery that took two months, he almost immediately began playing for the main team. In the same season, Dynamo almost won the Soviet Top League, being passed by Dynamo Kiev at the last second. While Dynamo Moscow would never achieve the level of that season, Kolyvanov improved his game significantly over the next few years, scoring 11 goals in the 1989 season of the Soviet Top League. It was then that he received his first call up for the Soviet national team, while still being a member of the Soviet U21 national team. In the Soviet Top League he established himself as a fine long shot striker that is able to score easily from outside the "penalty box". One of his biggest triumphs came for the latter of the two – in the 1990 UEFA European Under-21 Football Championship, he scored nine goals in seven matches, winning the best scorer award en route to winning the Championship. He followed up this performance by scoring 18 goals in 27 matches for Dynamo Moscow in 1991, once again winning the top-scorer award. The same year, his playing for the national team caught Foggia Calcio's attention, and after Dynamo reached the third-round of the UEFA Cup, he was allowed to transfer to Italy.

=== Foggia Calcio ===
After his transfer to Foggia Calcio, Kolyvanov was initially overwhelmed by the emphasis placed on conditioning, by then coach Zdeněk Zeman. The 4–3–3 system also took adjustment because Kolyvanov was used to playing as a center forward, while he had to assume a more pulled-back role now. During the time it took for these adjustments, coupled with slight injuries, Kolyvanov did not start for the team, but rather came on as a substitute. However starting with his second season he became a cornerstone of Foggia's attack, consistently placing in the middle of the Serie A until the 1994–95 season. That season he experienced another injury (right before a planned transfer to Inter Milan which consequently fell through), and Foggia slumped to the bottom of the Seria A and being relegated to Serie B. Although Kolyvanov was persuaded to stay by the management of the club another season, by the promise of promotion next season. In 1996 when Foggia failed to win promotion to Serie A he transferred to a team that did achieve promotion, Bologna F.C. 1909.

=== Bologna ===
At Bologna, Kolyvanov was able to play as a pure striker once again, without having responsibilities across the entire field like in Foggia. This immediately reflected on his goal scoring, and he was Bologna's top striker in his first season, with 11 goals in 27 games. The next few years he continued to score consistently, until the 1999–2000 season where a back problem resurfaced and he was forced to undergo an operation, essentially missing almost the entire season. An attempted comeback in mid-2000 was hampered by further injuries, and in 2001 Kolyvanov retired from professional football.

== Coaching career ==
After a brief stint as the Russia U19 national team assistant coach in 2002, and enrollment in a football coaching institute, Kolyvanov took over the Russia U15 national team as the head coach. He took a number of tours throughout the country to select the players, who eventually became the Russia U17 national team that won the 2006 UEFA European Under-17 Football Championship. Kolyvanov's achievement as a coach was exemplified by the very organized and consistent tactical play of the team, especially for players of that age, along with extreme motivation. Although never listed amongst the tournament's favorites, and without star players, Russia was able to win because of these traits. After the victory, Kolyvanov was offered an extension to his contract, along with a salary raise. He remained the head coach of the same age group national team, when it effectively turned into the U19 team. On 20 November 2008, he was announced as the new head-coach of the Russia U21 team.

After returning FC Torpedo Moscow to the second-tier Russian Football National League at the end of the 2018–19 season, he was replaced by Sergei Ignashevich on 4 June 2019.

On 12 May 2022, Kolyvanov was hired by Tekstilshchik Ivanovo. The team was in last place in the FNL and could not at that point avoid relegation to the third-tier FNL2.

== Career statistics ==
=== Club ===
Appearances and goals by club, season and competition
Club	Season	League		
Club	Season	Division	Apps	Goals
FShM	1985	Soviet Second League	2	0
Dynamo Moscow	1986	Soviet Top League	17	4
Dynamo Moscow	1987	Soviet Top League	26	2
Dynamo Moscow	1988	Soviet Top League	26	2
Dynamo Moscow	1989	Soviet Top League	25	11
Dynamo Moscow	1990	Soviet Top League	19	5
Dynamo Moscow	1991	Soviet Top League	27	18
Dynamo Moscow	Total		140	42
Foggia	1991–92	Serie A	15	3
Foggia	1992–93	Serie A	26	5
Foggia	1993–94	Serie A	25	6
Foggia	1994–95	Serie A	11	4
Foggia	1995–96	Serie B	29	4
Foggia	Total		106	22
Bologna	1996–97	Serie A	27	11
Bologna	1997–98	Serie A	31	9
Bologna	1998–99	Serie A	20	6
Bologna	1999–2000	Serie A	8	0
Bologna	2000–01	Serie A	1	0
Bologna	Total		87	26
Career total			335	90

=== International ===
Appearances and goals by national team and year
National team	Year	Apps	Goals
Soviet Union	1989	1	0
Soviet Union	1990	8	1
Soviet Union	1991	10	1
Soviet Union	Total	19	2
CIS	1992	5	1
CIS	Total	5	1
Russia	1992	1	0
Russia	1993	6	1
Russia	1994	2	1
Russia	1995	4	4
Russia	1996	12	4
Russia	1997	7	1
Russia	1998	3	1
Russia	Total	35	12
Career total		59	15

- Kolyvanov's team's score listed first, score column indicates score after each Kolyvanov goal.

List of international goals scored by Igor Kolyvanov
No.	Team	Date	Venue	Opponent	Score	Result	Competition	Ref.
1	Soviet Union	30 November 1990	Estadio Doroteo Guamuch Flores, Guatemala City, Guatemala	Guatemala	3–0	3–0	Friendly	
2	Soviet Union	23 May 1991	Old Trafford, Manchester, England	Argentina	1–1	1–1	Friendly	
3	CIS	3 June 1992	Brøndby Stadium, Brøndbyvester, Denmark	Denmark	1–1	1–1	Friendly	
4	Russia	28 April 1993	Luzhniki Stadium, Moscow, Russia	Hungary	2–0	3–0	1994 FIFA World Cup qualification	
5	Russia	12 October 1994	Luzhniki Stadium, Moscow, Russia	San Marino	2–0	4–0	UEFA Euro 1996 qualifying	
6	Russia	7 June 1995	San Marino Stadium, Serravalle, San Marino	San Marino	6–0	7–0	UEFA Euro 1996 qualifying	
7	Russia	16 August 1995	Helsinki Olympic Stadium, Helsinki, Finland	Finland	5–0	6–0	UEFA Euro 1996 qualifying	
8	Russia	16 August 1995	Helsinki Olympic Stadium, Helsinki, Finland	Finland	6–0	6–0	UEFA Euro 1996 qualifying	
9	Russia	6 September 1995	Svangaskarð, Toftir, Faroe Islands	Faroe Islands	3–2	5–2	UEFA Euro 1996 qualifying	
10	Russia	27 March 1996	Lansdowne Road, Dublin, Ireland	Ireland	2–0	2–0	Friendly	
11	Russia	25 May 1996	Khalifa International Stadium, Al Rayyan, Qatar	Qatar	3–0	5–2	Friendly	
12	Russia	1 September 1996	Central Dynamo Stadium, Moscow, Russia	Cyprus	2–0	4–0	1998 FIFA World Cup qualification	
13	Russia	9 October 1996	Ramat Gan Stadium, Ramat Gan, Israel	Israel	1–1	1–1	1998 FIFA World Cup qualification	
14	Russia	11 October 1997	Luzhniki Stadium, Moscow, Russia	Bulgaria	2–0	4–2	1998 FIFA World Cup qualification	
15	Russia	18 February 1998	Olympic Stadium, Athens, Greece	Greece	1–1	1–1	Friendly	

== Honours ==
=== Player ===
- UEFA European Under-21 Championship: 1990
- Soviet Top League: runner-up 1986; third place 1991
- UEFA Intertoto Cup: 1998

Individual

- Soviet Footballer of the Year: 1991
- Soviet Top League top scorer: 1991 (18 goals in 27 games)
- Bologna top scorer: 1996–97 (11 goals in 27 matches)
- Member of Grigoriy Fedotov Club: 117 goals in professional competition
- Co-holder of Soviet Top League record for goals in one match – five

=== Managerial ===
- UEFA European Under-17 Championship: 2006
- Russian Professional Football League Zone best coach (2018–19).
