= Russia national football team results (1992–2019) =

The Russia national football team represents Russia in international association football under the control of the Russian Football Union. Russia is a member of FIFA and UEFA.

After the dissolution of the Soviet Union in December 1991, all the organizations, including the football federation, were disbanded. Since the Soviet Union had already qualified for the Euro 1992, a new team and association representing the Commonwealth of Independent States was formed. The team ceased to exist shortly after the Euro 92.

Russia played its first international against Mexico on 16 August 1992 at the Lokomotiv Stadium in Moscow, winning the match 2–0.

From its inception, the Russian squad has participated in four World Cups (1994, 2002, 2014 and 2018 – the latter as hosts), one Confederations Cup (2017) and five European Championship (1996, 2004, 2008, 2012 and 2016).

This is a list of the Russia national football team results from 1992 to 2019.

== Key ==
The coloured backgrounds denote the result of the match:

– indicates Russia won the match
– indicates Russia's opposition won the match
– indicates the match ended in a draw

== 1990s ==
=== 1992 ===
16 August 1992 Friendly	Russia	2–0	Mexico	Moscow, Russia
	Karpin 61' (pen.); Popov 66'	Report		Stadium: Lokomotiv Stadium; Referee: Vadim Zhuk (Belarus)

14 October 1992 1994 FIFA WC qualification	Russia	1–0	Iceland	Moscow, Russia
	Yuran 65'	Report		Stadium: Luzhniki Stadium; Referee: Lyube Spasov (Bulgaria)

28 October 1992 1994 FIFA WC qualification	Russia	2–0	Luxembourg	Moscow, Russia
	Yuran 5'; Radchenko 24'	Report		Stadium: Luzhniki Stadium; Referee: Ilkka Koho (Finland)

=== 1993 ===
13 February 1993 Friendly	United States	0–1	Russia	Orlando, United States
		Report	Sergeyev 12'	Stadium: Citrus Bowl; Referee: Jack D'Aquila (United States)

18 February 1993 Friendly	El Salvador	1–2	Russia	Los Angeles, United States
	Díaz Arce 60'	Report	Onopko 53' (pen.); Tedeyev 55'	Stadium: Rose Bowl; Referee: Arturo Angeles (United States)

21 February 1993 Friendly	United States	0–0	Russia	San Jose, United States
		Report		Stadium: Stanford Stadium; Referee: Brian Hill (United States)

24 March 1993 Friendly	Israel	2–2	Russia	Haifa, Israel
	Mizrahi 64', 70'	Report	Popov 50', 62'	Stadium: Kiryat Eliezer Stadium; Referee: Yaacov Scheiner (Israel)

14 April 1993 1994 FIFA WC qualification	Luxembourg	0–4	Russia	Luxembourg City, Luxembourg
		Report	Kiriakov 11', 46'; Shalimov 58'; Kulkov 90'	Stadium: Stade Municipal; Referee: Alan Snoddy (Northern Ireland)

28 April 1993 1994 FIFA WC qualification	Russia	3–0	Hungary	Moscow, Russia
	Kanchelskis 55'; Kolyvanov 60'; Yuran 85'	Report		Stadium: Luzhniki Stadium; Referee: Guy Goethals (Belgium)

23 May 1993 1994 FIFA WC qualification	Russia	1–1	Greece	Moscow, Russia
	Dobrovolski 70' (pen.)	Report	Mitropoulos 45'	Stadium: Luzhniki Stadium; Referee: Peter Mikkelsen (Denmark)

2 June 1993 1994 FIFA WC qualification	Iceland	1–1	Russia	Reykjavík, Iceland
	Sverrisson 25'	Report	Kiriakov 38'	Stadium: Laugardalsvöllur; Referee: Les Mottram (Scotland)

28 July 1993 Friendly	France	3–1	Russia	Caen, France
	Sauzée 16'; Cantona 20'; Papin 36'	Report	Blanc 23' (o.g.)	Stadium: Stade Michel d'Ornano; Referee: Alfredo Trentalange (Italy)

8 September 1993 1994 FIFA WC qualification	Hungary	1–3	Russia	Budapest, Hungary
	Klausz 20'	Report	Pyatnitsky 14'; Kiriakov 53'; Borodyuk 89'	Stadium: Üllői úti Stadion; Referee: Gheorghe Constantin (Romania)

6 October 1993 Friendly	Saudi Arabia	4–2	Russia	Riyadh, Saudi Arabia
	Al-Muwallid 33' (pen.); Galiamin 60' (o.g.); Falatah 65'; Al-Mehallel 88'	Report	Mostovoi 23', 72'	Stadium: King Fahd International Stadium; Referee: Abdullah Al Khaldi (Saudi Arabia)

17 November 1993 1994 FIFA WC qualification	Greece	1–0	Russia	Athens, Greece
	Machlas 69'	Report		Stadium: Olympic Stadium; Referee: Jean-Fidele Diramba (Gabon)

=== 1994 ===
29 January 1994 Friendly	United States	1–1	Russia	Seattle, United States
	Lalas 85'	Report	Radchenko 52'	Stadium: Kingdome; Referee: Bob Sawtell (Canada)

2 February 1994 Friendly	Mexico	1–4	Russia	Oakland, United States
	García Aspe 26'	Report	Borodyuk 4', 45', 56'; Radchenko 38'	Stadium: Oakland–Alameda County Coliseum; Referee: Brian Hall (United States)

23 March 1994 Friendly	Republic of Ireland	0–0	Russia	Dublin, Ireland
		Report		Stadium: Lansdowne Road; Referee: Christer Fällström (Sweden)

20 April 1994 Friendly	Turkey	0–1	Russia	Bursa, Turkey
		Report	Radchenko 10'	Stadium: Bursa Atatürk Stadium; Referee: Adrian Porumboiu (Romania)

29 May 1994 Friendly	Russia	2–1	Slovakia	Moscow, Russia
	Pyatnitsky 49'; Tsymbalar 59'	Report	Tittel 34'	Stadium: Luzhniki Stadium; Referee: Vadzim Zhuk (Belarus)

20 June 1994 1994 FIFA World Cup	Brazil	2–0	Russia	Stanford, United States
	Romário 26'; Raí 52' (pen.)	Report		Stadium: Stanford Stadium

24 June 1994 1994 FIFA World Cup	Sweden	3–1	Russia	Pontiac, United States
	Brolin 37' (pen.); Dahlin 59', 81'	Report	Salenko 4' (pen.)	Stadium: Pontiac Silverdome

28 June 1994 1994 FIFA World Cup	Russia	6–1	Cameroon	Stanford, United States
	Salenko 15', 41', 44' (pen.), 72', 75'; Radchenko 81'	Report	Milla 46'	Stadium: Stanford Stadium

17 August 1994 Friendly	Austria	0–3	Russia	Klagenfurt, Austria
		Report	Beschastnykh 43'; Nikiforov 53'; Simutenkov 83'	Stadium: Wörthersee Stadion

7 September 1994 Friendly	Russia	0–1	Germany	Moscow, Russia
		Report	Kuntz 7'	Stadium: Luzhniki Stadium

12 October 1994 UEFA Euro 1996 qualifying	Russia	4–0	San Marino	Moscow, Russia
	Karpin 43'; Kolyvanov 64'; Nikiforov 65'; Radchenko 67'	Report		Stadium: Luzhniki Stadium

16 November 1994 UEFA Euro 1996 qualifying	Scotland	1–1	Russia	Glasgow, Scotland
	Booth 19'	Report	Radchenko 25'	Stadium: Hampden Park

=== 1995 ===
8 March 1995 Friendly	Slovakia	2–1	Russia	Košice, Slovakia
	Dubovský 26', 69'	Report	Karpin 78'	Stadium: Všešportový areál

29 March 1995 UEFA Euro 1996 qualifying	Russia	0–0	Scotland	Moscow, Russia
		Report		Stadium: Luzhniki Stadium

26 April 1995 UEFA Euro 1996 qualifying	Greece	0–3	Russia	Thessaloniki, Greece
		Report	Nikiforov 36'; Zagorakis 78' (o.g.); Beschastnykh 79'	Stadium: Kaftanzoglio Stadium

6 May 1995 UEFA Euro 1996 qualifying	Russia	3–0	Faroe Islands	Moscow, Russia
	Kechinov 53'; Pisarev 72'; Mukhamadiev 80'	Report		Stadium: Luzhniki Stadium

31 May 1995 Friendly	FR Yugoslavia	1–2	Russia	Belgrade, Yugoslavia
	Petković 34'	Report	Karpin 33' (pen.); Beschastnykh 41'	Stadium: Red Star Stadium

7 June 1995 UEFA Euro 1996 qualifying	San Marino	0–7	Russia	Serravalle, San Marino
		Report	Dobrovolski 20' (pen.); Kulkov 38'; Kiriakov 48'; Shalimov 49'; Beschastnykh 59'; Kolyvanov 64'; Cheryshev 86'	Stadium: Stadio Olimpico

16 August 1995 UEFA Euro 1996 qualifying	Finland	0–6	Russia	Helsinki, Finland
		Report	Kulkov 33', 49'; Karpin 41'; Radchenko 43'; Kolyvanov 66', 69'	Stadium: Helsinki Olympic Stadium

6 September 1995 UEFA Euro 1996 qualifying	Faroe Islands	2–5	Russia	Toftir, Faroe Islands
	Jarnskor 12'; Jónsson 53'	Report	Mostovoi 9' (pen.); Kiriakov 61'; Kolyvanov 65'; Tsymbalar 83'; Shalimov 85'	Stadium: Svangaskarð

11 October 1995 UEFA Euro 1996 qualifying	Russia	2–1	Greece	Moscow, Russia
	Ouzounidis 36' (o.g.); Onopko 71'	Report	Tsalouchidis 64'	Stadium: Luzhniki Stadium

15 November 1995 UEFA Euro 1996 qualifying	Russia	3–1	Finland	Moscow, Russia
	Radchenko 40'; Kulkov 55'; Kiriakov 70'	Report	Suominen 44'	Stadium: Luzhniki Stadium

=== 1996 ===
7 February 1996 1996 Rothmans International Tournament	Malta	0–2	Russia	Ta' Qali, Malta
		Report	Karpin 26'; Kiriakov 61'	Stadium: National Stadium

9 February 1996 1996 Rothmans International Tournament	Iceland	0–3	Russia	Ta' Qali, Malta
		Report	Kanchelskis 12'; Karpin 63', 65'	Stadium: National Stadium

11 February 1996 1996 Rothmans International Tournament	Russia	3–1	Slovenia	Ta' Qali, Malta
		Report	Simutenkov 13', 73'; Alenichev 18'	Stadium: National Stadium

27 March 1996 Friendly	Republic of Ireland	0–2	Russia	Dublin, Ireland
		Report	Mostovoi 34'; Kolyvanov 53'	Stadium: Lansdowne Road

24 April 1996 Friendly	Belgium	0–0	Russia	Brussels, Belgium
		Report		Stadium: King Baudouin Stadium

25 May 1996 Friendly	Qatar	2–5	Russia	Doha, Qatar
	Mustafa 53'; Hassan 89'	Report	Kiriakov 2', 58'; Kanchelskis 5'; Kolyvanov 27'; Mostovoi 78'	Stadium: Khalifa International Stadium

29 May 1996 Friendly	Russia	1–0	United Arab Emirates	Moscow, Russia
	Simutenkov 84'	Report		Stadium: Central Dynamo Stadium

2 June 1996 Friendly	Russia	2–0	Poland	Moscow, Russia
	Kovtun 21'; Beschastnykh 72'	Report		Stadium: Central Dynamo Stadium

11 June 1996 UEFA Euro 1996	Italy	2–1	Russia	Liverpool, England
	Casiraghi 5', 52'	Report	Tsymbalar 21'	Stadium: Anfield

16 June 1996 UEFA Euro 1996	Russia	0–3	Germany	Manchester, England
		Report	Sammer 56'; Klinsmann 77', 90'	Stadium: Old Trafford

19 June 1996 UEFA Euro 1996	Russia	3–3	Czech Republic	Liverpool, England
	Mostovoi 49'; Tetradze 54'; Beschastnykh 85'	Report	Suchopárek 5'; Kuka 19'; Šmicer 88'	Stadium: Anfield

28 August 1996 Friendly	Russia	2–2	Brazil	Moscow, Russia
	Nikiforov 18' (pen.); Radimov 80'	Report	Donizete 46'; Ronaldo 84' (pen.)	Stadium: Central Dynamo Stadium

1 September 1996 1998 FIFA WC qualification	Russia	4–0	Cyprus	Moscow, Russia
	Nikiforov 8', 50'; Kolyvanov 34'; Beschastnykh 81'	Report		Stadium: Central Dynamo Stadium

9 October 1996 1998 FIFA WC qualification	Israel	1–1	Russia	Ramat Gan, Israel
	Brumer 65'	Report	Kolyvanov 82'	Stadium: Ramat Gan Stadium

10 November 1996 1998 FIFA WC qualification	Luxembourg	0–4	Russia	Luxembourg City, Luxembourg
		Report	Tikhonov 34'; Kanchelskis 38'; Beschastnykh 50'; Karpin 77'	Stadium: Stade Josy Barthel

=== 1997 ===
7 February 1997 1997 Carlsberg Cup	Russia	1–1 (6–5 p)	FR Yugoslavia	So Kon Po, Hong Kong
	Popov 67'	Report	Drobnjak 40'	Stadium: Hong Kong Stadium

10 February 1997 1997 Carlsberg Cup	Russia	2–1	Switzerland	So Kon Po, Hong Kong
	Simutenkov 23', 26'	Report	Thüler 81'	Stadium: Hong Kong Stadium

12 March 1997 Friendly	FR Yugoslavia	0–0	Russia	Belgrade, Yugoslavia
		Report

29 March 1997 1998 FIFA WC qualification	Cyprus	1–1	Russia	Paralimni, Cyprus
	Gogić 31'	Report	Simutenkov 32'	Stadium: Paralimni Stadium

30 April 1997 1998 FIFA WC qualification	Russia	3–0	Luxembourg	Moscow, Russia
	Kechinov 20'; Grishin 55'; Simutenkov 58'	Report		Stadium: Central Dynamo Stadium

8 June 1997 1998 FIFA WC qualification	Russia	2–0	Israel	Moscow, Russia
	Radimov 8'; Kosolapov 38'	Report		Stadium: Central Dynamo Stadium

20 August 1997 Friendly	Russia	0–1	FR Yugoslavia	Saint Petersburg, Russia
		Report	Jokanović 86'	Stadium: Petrovsky Stadium

10 September 1997 1998 FIFA WC qualification	Bulgaria	1–0	Russia	Sofia, Bulgaria
	Ivanov 55'	Report		Stadium: Vasil Levski National Stadium

11 October 1997 1998 FIFA WC qualification	Russia	4–2	Bulgaria	Moscow, Russia
	Alenichev 13', 57'; Kolyvanov 41'; Yuran 52'	Report	Gruev 68'; Kostadinov 78'	Stadium: Luzhniki Stadium

29 October 1997 1998 FIFA WC qualification	Russia	1–1	Italy	Moscow, Russia
	Cannavaro 52' (o.g.)	Report	Vieri 49'	Stadium: Central Dynamo Stadium

15 November 1997 1998 FIFA WC qualification	Italy	1–0	Russia	Naples, Italy
	Casiraghi 52'	Report		Stadium: Stadio San Paolo

=== 1998 ===
18 February 1998 Friendly	Greece	1–1	Russia	Athens, Greece
	Frantzeskos 8'	Report	Kolyvanov 66'

25 March 1998 Friendly	Russia	1–0	France	Moscow, Russia
	Yuran 2'	Report

22 April 1998 Friendly	Russia	1–0	Turkey	Moscow, Russia
	Beschastnykh 2'	Report		Stadium: Lokomotiv Stadium

27 May 1998 Friendly	Poland	3–1	Russia	Chorzów, Poland
	Trzeciak 4'; Hajto 57', 90'	Report	Gerasimenko 8'	Stadium: Silesian Stadium

30 May 1998 Friendly	Georgia	1–1	Russia	Tbilisi, Georgia
	Janashia 19'	Report	Simutenkov 9'	Stadium: Boris Paichadze National Stadium

19 August 1998 Friendly	Sweden	1–0	Russia	Örebro, Sweden
	Pettersson 3'	Report

5 September 1998 UEFA Euro 2000 qualifying	Ukraine	3–2	Russia	Kyiv, Ukraine
	Popov 14'; Skachenko 24'; Rebrov 74' (pen.)	Report	Varlamov 67'; Onopko 88'	Stadium: NSC Olimpiyskiy

23 September 1998 Friendly	Spain	1–0	Russia	Granada, Spain
	Alkiza 39'	Report		Stadium: Los Cármenes

10 October 1998 UEFA Euro 2000 qualifying	Russia	2–3	France	Moscow, Russia
	Yanovsky 45'; Mostovoi 55'	Report	Anelka 13'; Pires 28'; Boghossian 81'	Stadium: Luzhniki Stadium

14 October 1998 UEFA Euro 2000 qualifying	Iceland	1–0	Russia	Reykjavík, Iceland
	Kovtun 87' (o.g.)	Report		Stadium: Laugardalsvöllur

18 November 1998 Friendly	Brazil	5–1	Russia	Fortaleza, Brazil
	Élber 3'; Amoroso 19', 70'; Assunção 40'; Rivaldo 44' (pen.)	Report	Kornaukhov 66' (pen.)	Stadium: Castelão

=== 1999 ===
27 March 1999 UEFA Euro 2000 qualifying	Armenia	0–3	Russia	Yerevan, Armenia
		Report	Karpin 7', 63' (pen.); Beschastnykh 89'	Stadium: Hrazdan Stadium

31 March 1999 UEFA Euro 2000 qualifying	Russia	6–1	Andorra	Moscow, Russia
	Titov 8'; Beschastnykh 11', 62'; Onopko 42'; Tsymbalar 50'; Alenichev 90'	Report	Juli Sánchez 73'	Stadium: Lokomotiv Stadium

19 May 1999 Friendly	Russia	1–1	Belarus	Tula, Russia
	Mostovoi 31'	Report	Tarlowski 47'	Stadium: Arsenal Stadium

5 June 1999 UEFA Euro 2000 qualifying	France	2–3	Russia	Saint-Denis, France
	Petit 48'; Wiltord 54'	Report	Panov 40', 75'; Karpin 87'	Stadium: Stade de France

9 June 1999 UEFA Euro 2000 qualifying	Russia	1–0	Iceland	Moscow, Russia
	Karpin 44'	Report		Stadium: Central Dynamo Stadium

18 August 1999 Friendly	Belarus	0–2	Russia	Minsk, Belarus
		Report	Beschastnykh 40'; Panov 47'	Stadium: Dinamo Stadium

4 September 1999 UEFA Euro 2000 qualifying	Russia	2–0	Armenia	Moscow, Russia
	Beschastnykh 8' (pen.); Karpin 70'	Report		Stadium: Luzhniki Stadium

8 September 1999 UEFA Euro 2000 qualifying	Andorra	1–2	Russia	Aixovall, Andorra
	Justo Ruiz 39' (pen.)	Report	Onopko 22', 57'	Stadium: Camp d’Esports d’Aixovall

9 October 1999 UEFA Euro 2000 qualifying	Russia	1–1	Ukraine	Moscow, Russia
	Karpin 75'	Report	Shevchenko 88'	Stadium: Luzhniki Stadium

== 2000s ==
=== 2000 ===
23 February 2000 Friendly	Israel	4–1	Russia	Haifa, Israel
	Badir 3', 35' (pen.); Udi 12'; Nimni 87'	Report	Beschastnykh 58'	Stadium: Kiryat Eliezer Stadium

26 April 2000 Friendly	Russia	2–0	United States	Moscow, Russia
	Titov 64'; Karpin 90'	Report		Stadium: Central Dynamo Stadium

31 May 2000 Friendly	Russia	1–1	Slovakia	Moscow, Russia
	Beschastnykh 60'	Report	Fabuš 25'	Stadium: Central Dynamo Stadium

4 June 2000 Friendly	Moldova	0–1	Russia	Chișinău, Moldova
		Report	Buznikin 14'	Stadium: Stadionul Republican

16 August 2000 Friendly	Russia	1–0	Israel	Moscow, Russia
	Buznikin 82'	Report		Stadium: Luzhniki Stadium

2 September 2000 2002 FIFA WC qualification	Switzerland	0–1	Russia	Zürich, Switzerland
		Report	Beschastnykh 74'	Stadium: Hardturm

11 October 2000 2002 FIFA WC qualification	Russia	3–0	Luxembourg	Moscow, Russia
	Buznikin 19'; Khokhlov 57'; Titov 90'	Report		Stadium: Central Dynamo Stadium

=== 2001 ===
28 February 2001 Friendly	Greece	3–3	Russia	Heraklion, Greece
	Charisteas 2', 32'; Basinas 90'	Report	Buznikin 34', 70'; Khokhlov 48'	Stadium: Theodoros Vardinogiannis Stadium

24 March 2001 2002 FIFA WC qualification	Russia	1–1	Slovenia	Moscow, Russia
	Khokhlov 7'	Report	Knavs 21'	Stadium: Luzhniki Stadium

28 March 2001 2002 FIFA WC qualification	Russia	1–0	Faroe Islands	Moscow, Russia
	Mostovoi 18'	Report		Stadium: Luzhniki Stadium

25 April 2001 2002 FIFA WC qualification	FR Yugoslavia	0–1	Russia	Belgrade, Yugoslavia
		Report	Beschastnykh 72'	Stadium: Red Star Stadium

2 June 2001 2002 FIFA WC qualification	Russia	1–1	FR Yugoslavia	Moscow, Russia
	Kovtun 25'	Report	Mijatović 32'	Stadium: Luzhniki Stadium

6 June 2001 2002 FIFA WC qualification	Luxembourg	1–2	Russia	Luxembourg City, Luxembourg
	Schneider 49'	Report	Alenichev 16'; Semak 76'	Stadium: Stade Josy Barthel

15 August 2001 Friendly	Russia	0–0	Greece	Moscow, Russia
		Report		Stadium: Luzhniki Stadium

1 September 2001 2002 FIFA WC qualification	Slovenia	2–1	Russia	Ljubljana, Slovenia
	Osterc 62'; Ačimovič 90' (pen.)	Report	Titov 72'	Stadium: Bežigrad Stadium

5 September 2001 2002 FIFA WC qualification	Faroe Islands	0–3	Russia	Tórshavn, Faroe Islands
		Report	Beschastnykh 19', 29'; Shirko 88'	Stadium: Tórsvøllur

6 October 2001 2002 FIFA WC qualification	Russia	4–0	Switzerland	Moscow, Russia
	Beschastnykh 14' (pen.), 19', 38'; Titov 83'	Report		Stadium: Central Dynamo Stadium

14 November 2001 Friendly	Latvia	1–3	Russia	Riga, Latvia
	Astafjevs 89'	Report	Khokhlov 8'; Alenichev 48'; Panov 81'	Stadium: Skonto Stadium

=== 2002 ===
13 February 2002 Friendly	Republic of Ireland	2–0	Russia	Dublin, Ireland
	Reid 3'; Keane 21'	Report		Stadium: Lansdowne Road

27 February 2002 Friendly	Estonia	2–1	Russia	Tallinn, Estonia
	Oper 11', 87'	Report	Beschastnykh 18'	Stadium: A. Le Coq Arena

17 April 2002 Friendly	France	0–0	Russia	Saint-Denis, France
		Report		Stadium: Stade de France

17 May 2002 2002 LG Cup	Russia	1–1 (4–5 p)	Belarus	Moscow, Russia
	Solomatin 28' (pen.)	Report	Byalkevich 15'	Stadium: Central Dynamo Stadium
	Penalties
	Khokhlov (penalty missed); Nikiforov (penalty missed); Semshov (penalty scored); Semak (penalty missed); Solomatin (penalty scored); Karyaka (penalty scored); Alenichev (penalty scored); Pimenov (penalty missed)		(penalty missed) Kulchy; (penalty missed) Shtanyuk; (penalty scored) Byalkevich; (penalty missed) Romaschenko; (penalty scored) Hleb; (penalty scored) Astrowski; (penalty scored) Amelyanchuk; (penalty scored) Kowba

19 May 2002 2002 LG Cup	Russia	1–1 (5–6 p)	FR Yugoslavia	Moscow, Russia
		Report		Stadium: Central Dynamo Stadium

5 June 2002 2002 FIFA World Cup	Russia	2–0	Tunisia	Kobe, Japan
	Titov 59'; Karpin 64' (pen.)	Report		Stadium: Kobe Wing Stadium

9 June 2002 2002 FIFA World Cup	Japan	1–0	Russia	Yokohama, Japan
	Inamoto 51'	Report		Stadium: International Stadium Yokohama

14 June 2002 2002 FIFA World Cup	Belgium	3–2	Russia	Shizuoka, Japan
	Walem 7'; Sonck 78'; Wilmots 82'	Report	Beschastnykh 52'; Sychev 88'	Stadium: Shizuoka Stadium

21 August 2002 Friendly	Russia	1–1	Sweden	Moscow, Russia
	Kerzhakov 56'	Report	Ibrahimović 90'	Stadium: Lokomotiv Stadium

7 September 2002 UEFA Euro 2004 qualifying	Russia	4–2	Republic of Ireland	Moscow, Russia
	Karyaka 20'; Beschastnykh 24'; Kerzhakov 71'; Babb 88'	Report	Doherty 69'; Morrison 76'	Stadium: Lokomotiv Stadium

16 October 2002 UEFA Euro 2004 qualifying	Russia	4–1	Albania	Volgograd, Russia
	Kerzhakov 3'; Semak 42', 55'; Onopko 52'	Report	Duro 13'	Stadium: Central Stadium

=== 2003 ===
12 February 2003 2003 Cyprus International Football Tournament	Cyprus	0–1	Russia	Limassol, Cyprus
		Report	Khokhlov 43'	Stadium: Tsirio Stadium

13 February 2003 2003 Cyprus International Football Tournament	Russia	4–2	Romania	Limassol, Cyprus
	Șoavă 30' (o.g.); Karyaka 34'; Arshavin 41'; Gusev 59' (pen.)	Report	Tamaș 12'; Grigorie 70' (pen.)	Stadium: Tsirio Stadium

29 March 2003 UEFA Euro 2004 qualifying	Albania	3–1	Russia	Shkodër, Albania
	Rraklli 20'; Lala 79'; Tare 82'	Report	Karyaka 76'	Stadium: Loro Boriçi Stadium

30 April 2003 UEFA Euro 2004 qualifying	Georgia	1–0	Russia	Tbilisi, Georgia
	Asatiani 12'	Report		Stadium: Mikheil Meskhi Stadium

7 June 2003 UEFA Euro 2004 qualifying	Switzerland	2–2	Russia	Basel, Switzerland
	Frei 13', 15'	Report	Ignashevich 23', 67' (pen.)	Stadium: St. Jakob Park

20 August 2003 Friendly	Russia	1–2	Israel	Moscow, Russia
	Semak 86'	Report	Nimni 52'; Balili 81'	Stadium: Lokomotiv Stadium

6 September 2003 UEFA Euro 2004 qualifying	Republic of Ireland	1–1	Russia	Dublin, Ireland
	Duff 35'	Report	Ignashevich 42'	Stadium: Lansdowne Road

10 September 2003 UEFA Euro 2004 qualifying	Russia	4–1	Switzerland	Moscow, Russia
	Bulykin 19', 32', 58'; Mostovoi 72'	Report	Karyaka 11' (o.g.)	Stadium: Lokomotiv Stadium

11 October 2003 UEFA Euro 2004 qualifying	Russia	3–1	Georgia	Moscow, Russia
	Bulykin 29'; Titov 45+1'; Sychev 73'	Report	Iashvili 3'	Stadium: Lokomotiv Stadium

15 November 2003 UEFA Euro 2004 qualifying	Russia	0–0	Wales	Moscow, Russia
		Report		Stadium: Lokomotiv Stadium

19 November 2003 UEFA Euro 2004 qualifying	Wales	0–1	Russia	Cardiff, Wales
		Report	Evseev 21'	Stadium: Millennium Stadium

=== 2004 ===
31 March 2004 Friendly	Bulgaria	2–2	Russia	Sofia, Bulgaria
	Berbatov 14', 67'	Report	Sychev 9', 31'	Stadium: Vasil Levski National Stadium

28 April 2004 Friendly	Norway	3–2	Russia	Oslo, Norway
	Andresen 25'; Rushfeldt 43'; Solli 62'	Report	Radimov 85'; Kirichenko 90'	Stadium: Ullevaal Stadion

25 May 2004 Friendly	Austria	0–0	Russia	Graz, Austria
		Report		Stadium: Arnold-Schwarzenegger-Stadion

12 June 2004 UEFA Euro 2004	Spain	1–0	Russia	Faro/Loulé, Portugal
	Valerón 60'	Report		Stadium: Estádio Algarve

16 June 2004 UEFA Euro 2004	Russia	0–2	Portugal	Lisbon, Portugal
		Report	Maniche 7'; Rui Costa 89'	Stadium: Estádio da Luz

20 June 2004 UEFA Euro 2004	Russia	2–1	Greece	Faro/Loulé, Portugal
	Kirichenko 2'; Bulykin 17'	Report	Vryzas 43'	Stadium: Estádio Algarve

18 August 2004 Friendly	Russia	4–3	Lithuania	Moscow, Russia
	Khokhlov 20'; Karyaka 54'; Bulykin 66'; Sychev 88'	Report	Danilevičius 40'; Poškus 83'; Barasa 89'	Stadium: Central Dynamo Stadium

4 September 2004 2006 FIFA WC qualification	Russia	1–1	Slovakia	Moscow, Russia
	Bulykin 14'	Report	Vittek 87'	Stadium: Central Dynamo Stadium

9 October 2004 2006 FIFA WC qualification	Luxembourg	0–4	Russia	Luxembourg City, Luxembourg
		Report	Sychev 56', 69', 86'; Arshavin 62'	Stadium: Stade Josy Barthel

13 October 2004 2006 FIFA WC qualification	Portugal	7–1	Russia	Lisbon, Portugal
	Pauleta 26'; Ronaldo 39', 69'; Deco 45'; Simão 82'; Petit 89', 90+2'	Report	Arshavin 79'	Stadium: Estádio José Alvalade

17 November 2004 2006 FIFA WC qualification	Russia	4–0	Estonia	Krasnodar, Russia
	Karyaka 23'; Izmailov 25'; Sychev 32'; Loskov 67' (pen.)	Report		Stadium: Kuban Stadium

=== 2005 ===
9 February 2005 Friendly	Italy	2–0	Russia	Cagliari, Italy
	Gilardino 56'; Barone 62'	Report		Stadium: Stadio Sant'Elia

26 March 2005 2006 FIFA WC qualification	Liechtenstein	1–2	Russia	Vaduz, Liechtenstein
	Beck 40'	Report	Kerzhakov 23'; Karyaka 37'	Stadium: Rheinpark Stadion

30 March 2005 2006 FIFA WC qualification	Estonia	1–1	Russia	Tallinn, Estonia
	Terehhov 63'	Report	Arshavin 18'	Stadium: A. Le Coq Arena

4 June 2005 2006 FIFA WC qualification	Russia	2–0	Latvia	Saint Petersburg, Russia
	Arshavin 56'; Loskov 78' (pen.)	Report		Stadium: Petrovsky Stadium

8 June 2005 Friendly	Germany	2–2	Russia	Mönchengladbach, Germany
	Schweinsteiger 30', 69'	Report	Anyukov 26'; Arshavin 90'	Stadium: Borussia-Park

17 August 2005 2006 FIFA WC qualification	Latvia	1–1	Russia	Riga, Latvia
	Astafjevs 6'	Report	Arshavin 24'	Stadium: Skonto Stadium

3 September 2005 2006 FIFA WC qualification	Russia	2–0	Liechtenstein	Moscow, Russia
	Kerzhakov 27', 66'	Report		Stadium: Lokomotiv Stadium

7 September 2005 2006 FIFA WC qualification	Russia	0–0	Portugal	Moscow, Russia
		Report		Stadium: Lokomotiv Stadium

8 October 2005 2006 FIFA WC qualification	Russia	5–1	Luxembourg	Moscow, Russia
	Izmailov 7'; Kerzhakov 18'; Pavlyuchenko 65'; Kirichenko 74', 90+3'	Report	Reiter 52' (pen.)	Stadium: Lokomotiv Stadium

12 October 2005 2006 FIFA WC qualification	Slovakia	0–0	Russia	Bratislava, Slovakia
		Report		Stadium: Tehelné pole

=== 2006 ===
1 March 2006 Friendly	Russia	0–1	Brazil	Moscow, Russia
		Report	Ronaldo 15'	Stadium: Lokomotiv Stadium

27 May 2006 Friendly	Spain	0–0	Russia	Albacete, Spain
		Report		Stadium: Estadio Carlos Belmonte

16 August 2006 Friendly	Russia	1–0	Latvia	Moscow, Russia
	Pogrebnyak 90'	Report		Stadium: Lokomotiv Stadium

6 September 2006 UEFA Euro 2008 qualifying	Russia	0–0	Croatia	Moscow, Russia
		Report		Stadium: Lokomotiv Stadium

7 October 2006 UEFA Euro 2008 qualifying	Russia	1–1	Israel	Moscow, Russia
	Arshavin 5'	Report	Ben Shushan 84'	Stadium: Central Dynamo Stadium

11 October 2006 UEFA Euro 2008 qualifying	Russia	2–0	Estonia	Saint Petersburg, Russia
	Pogrebnyak 78'; Sychev 90'	Report		Stadium: Petrovsky Stadium

15 November 2006 UEFA Euro 2008 qualifying	Macedonia	0–2	Russia	Skopje, Macedonia
		Report	Bystrov 18'; Arshavin 32'	Stadium: Skopje City Stadium

=== 2007 ===
7 February 2007 Friendly	Netherlands	4–1	Russia	Amsterdam, Netherlands
	Babel 68'; Sneijder 71'; Mathijsen 79'; van der Vaart 89'	Report	Bystrov 76'	Stadium: Amsterdam Arena

24 March 2007 UEFA Euro 2008 qualifying	Estonia	0–2	Russia	Tallinn, Estonia
		Report	Bystrov 66'; Kerzhakov 78'	Stadium: A. Le Coq Arena

2 June 2007 UEFA Euro 2008 qualifying	Russia	4–0	Andorra	Saint Petersburg, Russia
	Kerzhakov 8', 16', 49'; Sychev 71'	Report		Stadium: Petrovsky Stadium

6 June 2007 UEFA Euro 2008 qualifying	Croatia	0–0	Russia	Zagreb, Croatia
		Report		Stadium: Stadion Maksimir

22 August 2007 Friendly	Russia	2–2	Poland	Moscow, Russia
	Sychev 21'; Pavlyuchenko 34'	Report	Krzynówek 73'; Błaszczykowski 77'	Stadium: Lokomotiv Stadium

8 September 2007 UEFA Euro 2008 qualifying	Russia	3–0	Macedonia	Moscow, Russia
	Berezutski 8'; Arshavin 84'; Kerzhakov 88'	Report		Stadium: Lokomotiv Stadium

12 September 2007 UEFA Euro 2008 qualifying	England	3–0	Russia	London, England
	Owen 7', 31'; Ferdinand 84'	Report		Stadium: Wembley Stadium

17 October 2007 UEFA Euro 2008 qualifying	Russia	2–1	England	Moscow, Russia
	Pavlyuchenko 69' (pen.), 73'	Report	Rooney 29'	Stadium: Luzhniki Stadium

17 November 2007 UEFA Euro 2008 qualifying	Israel	2–1	Russia	Ramat Gan, Israel
	Barda 10'; Golan 90+2'	Report	Bilyaletdinov 61'	Stadium: Ramat Gan Stadium

21 November 2007 UEFA Euro 2008 qualifying	Andorra	0–1	Russia	Andorra la Vella, Andorra
		Report	Sychev 39'	Stadium: Estadi Comunal

=== 2008 ===
26 March 2008 Friendly	Romania	3–0	Russia	Bucharest, Romania
	Marica 45'; D. Niculae 60'; M. Niculae 75'	Report		Stadium: Stadionul Steaua

23 May 2008 Friendly	Russia	6–0	Kazakhstan	Moscow, Russia
	Pogrebnyak 27' (pen.); Bystrov 44'; Zyryanov 58'; Bilyaletdinov 85' (pen.); Torbinski 89'; Sychyov 90'	Report		Stadium: Lokomotiv Stadium

28 May 2008 Friendly	Russia	2–1	Serbia	Burghausen, Germany
	Pogrebnyak 12'; Pavlyuchenko 48'	Report	Pantelić 41'	Stadium: Wacker-Arena

4 June 2008 Friendly	Russia	4–1	Lithuania	Burghausen, Germany
	Zyryanov 33'; Arshavin 52'; Pavlyuchenko 64'; Bystrov 80'	Report	Savėnas 24'	Stadium: Wacker-Arena

10 June 2008 UEFA Euro 2008	Spain	4–1	Russia	Innsbruck, Austria
	Villa 20', 44', 75'; Fàbregas 90+1'	Report	Pavlyuchenko 86'	Stadium: Tivoli-Neu

14 June 2008 UEFA Euro 2008	Greece	0–1	Russia	Salzburg, Austria
		Report	Zyryanov 33'	Stadium: Stadion Wals-Siezenheim

18 June 2008 UEFA Euro 2008	Russia	2–0	Sweden	Innsbruck, Austria
	Pavlyuchenko 24'; Arshavin 50'	Report		Stadium: Tivoli-Neu

21 June 2008 UEFA Euro 2008	Netherlands	1–3 (a.e.t.)	Russia	Basel, Switzerland
	van Nistelrooy 86'	Report	Pavlyuchenko 56'; Torbinski 112'; Arshavin 116'	Stadium: St. Jakob-Park

26 June 2008 UEFA Euro 2008	Russia	0–3	Spain	Vienna, Austria
		Report	Xavi 50'; Güiza 73'; Silva 82'	Stadium: Ernst-Happel-Stadion

20 August 2008 Friendly	Russia	1–1	Netherlands	Moscow, Russia
	Zyryanov 77' (pen.)	Report	van Persie 24'	Stadium: Lokomotiv Stadium

10 September 2008 2010 FIFA WC qualification	Russia	2–1	Wales	Moscow, Russia
	Pavlyuchenko 22' (pen.); Pogrebnyak 81'	Report		Stadium: Lokomotiv Stadium

11 October 2008 2010 FIFA WC qualification	Germany	2–1	Russia	Dortmund, Germany
	Podolski 9'; Ballack 28'	Report	Podolski 51'	Stadium: Signal Iduna Park

15 October 2008 2010 FIFA WC qualification	Russia	3–0	Finland	Moscow, Russia
	Pasanen 23' (o.g.); Lampi 65' (o.g.); Arshavin 88'	Report		Stadium: Lokomotiv Stadium

=== 2009 ===
28 March 2009 2010 FIFA WC qualification	Russia	2–0	Azerbaijan	Moscow, Russia
	Pavlyuchenko 32'; Zyryanov 71'	Report		Stadium: Luzhniki Stadium

1 April 2009 2010 FIFA WC qualification	Liechtenstein	0–1	Russia	Vaduz, Liechtenstein
		Report	Zyryanov 38'	Stadium: Rheinpark Stadion

10 June 2009 2010 FIFA WC qualification	Finland	0–3	Russia	Helsinki, Finland
		Report	Kerzhakov 26', 53'; Zyryanov 71'	Stadium: Helsinki Olympic Stadium

12 August 2009 Friendly	Russia	2–3	Argentina	Moscow, Russia
	Semshov 17'; Pavlyuchenko 78'	Report	Agüero 45'; López 46'; Dátolo 59'	Stadium: Lokomotiv Stadium

5 September 2009 2010 FIFA WC qualification	Russia	3–0	Liechtenstein	Saint Petersburg, Russia
		Report	Berezutski 17'; Pavlyuchenko 40' (pen.), 45' (pen.)	Stadium: Petrovsky Stadium

9 September 2009 2010 FIFA WC qualification	Wales	1–3	Russia	Cardiff, Wales
	Collins 53'	Report	Semshov 36'; Ignashevich 71'; Pavlyuchenko 90+1'	Stadium: Millennium Stadium

10 October 2009 2010 FIFA WC qualification	Russia	0–1	Germany	Moscow, Russia
		Report	Klose 35'	Stadium: Luzhniki Stadium

14 October 2009 2010 FIFA WC qualification	Azerbaijan	1–1	Russia	Baku, Azerbaijan
	Javadov 54'	Report	Arshavin 13'	Stadium: Tofiq Bahramov Republican Stadium

14 November 2009 2010 FIFA WC qualification	Russia	2–1	Slovenia	Moscow, Russia
	Bilyaletdinov 40', 52'	Report	Pečnik 88'	Stadium: Luzhniki Stadium

18 November 2009 2010 FIFA WC qualification	Slovenia	1–0 (2a–2 agg.)	Russia	Maribor, Slovenia
	Dedić 44'	Report		Stadium: Ljudski vrt

== 2010s ==
=== 2010 ===
3 March 2010 Friendly	Hungary	1–1	Russia	Győr, Hungary
	Vanczák 39'	Report	Bilyaletdinov 59'	Stadium: ETO Park

11 August 2010 Friendly	Russia	1–0	Bulgaria	Saint Petersburg, Russia
	Shirokov 6'	Report		Stadium: Petrovsky Stadium

3 September 2010 UEFA Euro 2012 qualifying	Andorra	0–2	Russia	Andorra la Vella, Andorra
		Report	Pogrebnyak 14', 64' (pen.)	Stadium: Estadi Comunal

7 September 2010 UEFA Euro 2012 qualifying	Russia	0–1	Slovakia	Moscow, Russia
		Report	Stoch 27'	Stadium: Lokomotiv Stadium

8 October 2010 UEFA Euro 2012 qualifying	Republic of Ireland	2–3	Russia	Dublin, Ireland
	Keane 72' (pen.); Long 78'	Report	Kerzhakov 11'; Dzagoev 29'; Shirokov 50'	Stadium: Landsdowne Road

12 October 2010 UEFA Euro 2012 qualifying	Macedonia	0–1	Russia	Skopje, Macedonia
		Report	Kerzhakov 8'	Stadium: Philip II Arena

17 November 2010 Friendly	Russia	0–2	Belgium	Voronezh, Russia
		Report	Lukaku 2', 73'	Stadium: Trade Unions Central Stadium

=== 2011 ===
9 February 2011 Friendly	Iran	1–0	Russia	Madinat Zayed, United Arab Emirates
	Khalatbari 90'	Report		Stadium: Al Dhafra Stadium

16 March 2011 UEFA Euro 2012 qualifying	Armenia	0–0	Russia	Yerevan, Armenia
		Report		Stadium: Vazgen Sargsyan Republican Stadium

29 March 2011 Friendly	Qatar	1–1	Russia	Doha, Qatar
	Kasola 4'	Report	Pavlyuchenko 34'	Stadium: Jassim bin Hamad Stadium

4 June 2011 UEFA Euro 2012 qualifying	Russia	3–1	Armenia	Saint Petersburg, Russia
	Pavlyuchenko 26', 59', 73' (pen.)	Report	Pizzelli 25'	Stadium: Petrovsky Stadium

7 June 2011 Friendly	Cameroon	0–0	Russia	Salzburg, Austria
		Report		Stadium: Stadion Wals-Siezenheim

10 August 2011 Friendly	Russia	1–0	Serbia	Moscow, Russia
	Pogrebnyak 53'	Report		Stadium: Lokomotiv Stadium

2 September 2011 UEFA Euro 2012 qualifying	Russia	1–0	Macedonia	Moscow, Russia
	Semshov 41'	Report		Stadium: Luzhniki Stadium

6 September 2011 UEFA Euro 2012 qualifying	Russia	0–0	Republic of Ireland	Moscow, Russia
		Report		Stadium: Luzhniki Stadium

7 October 2011 UEFA Euro 2012 qualifying	Slovakia	0–1	Russia	Žilina, Slovakia
		Report	Dzagoev 71'	Stadium: Štadión pod Dubňom

11 October 2011 UEFA Euro 2012 qualifying	Russia	6–0	Andorra	Moscow, Russia
	Dzagoev 5', 44'; Ignashevich 26'; Pavlyuchenko 30'; Glushakov 59'; Bilyaletdinov 78'	Report		Stadium: Luzhniki Stadium

11 November 2011 Friendly	Greece	1–1	Russia	Piraeus, Greece
	Katsouranis 60'	Report	Shirokov 2'	Stadium: Karaiskakis Stadium

=== 2012 ===
29 February 2012 Friendly	Denmark	0–2	Russia	Copenhague, Denmark
		Report	Shirokov 4'; Arshavin 45'	Stadium: Parken Stadium

25 May 2012 Friendly	Russia	1–1	Uruguay	Moscow, Russia
	Kerzhakov 49'	Report	Suárez 47'	Stadium: Lokomotiv Stadium

29 May 2012 Friendly	Lithuania	0–0	Russia	Nyon, Switzerland
		Report		Stadium: Colovray Sports Centre

1 June 2012 Friendly	Italy	0–3	Russia	Zürich, Switzerland
		Report	Kerzhakov 60'; Shirokov 75', 89'	Stadium: Letzigrund

8 June 2012 UEFA Euro 2012	Russia	4–1	Czech Republic	Wrocław, Poland
	Dzagoev 15', 79'; Shirokov 24'; Pavlyuchenko 82'	Report	Pilař 52'	Stadium: Stadion Miejski

12 June 2012 UEFA Euro 2012	Poland	1–1	Russia	Warsaw, Poland
	Błaszczykowski 57'	Report	Dzagoev 37'	Stadium: National Stadium

16 June 2012 UEFA Euro 2012	Greece	1–0	Russia	Warsaw, Poland
	Karagounis 45+2'	Report		Stadium: National Stadium

15 August 2012 Friendly	Russia	1–1	Ivory Coast	Moscow, Russia
	Dzagoev 55'	Report	Gradel 77'	Stadium: Lokomotiv Stadium

7 September 2012 2014 FIFA WC qualification	Russia	2–0	Northern Ireland	Moscow, Russia
	Fayzulin 30'; Shirokov 78' (pen.)	Report		Stadium: Lokomotiv Stadium

11 September 2012 2014 FIFA WC qualification	Israel	0–4	Russia	Ramat Gan, Israel
		Report	Kerzhakov 7', 64'; Kokorin 68'; Fayzulin 78'	Stadium: Ramat Gan Stadium

12 October 2012 2014 FIFA WC qualification	Russia	1–0	Portugal	Moscow, Russia
	Kerzhakov 6'	Report		Stadium: Luzhniki Stadium

16 October 2012 2014 FIFA WC qualification	Russia	1–0	Azerbaijan	Moscow, Russia
	Shirokov 84' (pen.)	Report		Stadium: Luzhniki Stadium

14 November 2012 Friendly	Russia	2–2	United States	Krasnodar, Russia
	Smolov 9'; Shirokov 84' (pen.)	Report	Bradley 76'; Diskerud 90+3'	Stadium: Kuban Stadium

=== 2013 ===
6 February 2013 Friendly	Iceland	0–2	Russia	Marbella, Spain
		Report	Shirokov 43'; Shatov 66'	Stadium: Estadio Municipal de Marbella

25 March 2013 Friendly	Brazil	1–1	Russia	London, England
	Fred 90'	Report	Fayzulin 73'	Stadium: Stamford Bridge

7 June 2013 2014 FIFA WC qualification	Portugal	1–0	Russia	Lisbon, Portugal
	Postiga 9'	Report		Stadium: Estádio da Luz

14 August 2013 2014 FIFA WC qualification	Northern Ireland	1–0	Russia	Belfast, Northern Ireland
	Paterson 43'	Report		Stadium: Windsor Park

6 September 2013 2014 FIFA WC qualification	Russia	4–1	Luxembourg	Kazan, Russia
	Kokorin 1', 36'; Kerzhakov 59'; Samedov 90+3'	Report	Joachim 43'	Stadium: Central Stadium

10 September 2013 2014 FIFA WC qualification	Russia	3–1	Israel	Saint Petersburg, Russia
	Berezutski 49'; Kokorin 52'; Glushakov 74'	Report	Zahavi 90+3'	Stadium: Petrovsky Stadium

11 October 2013 2014 FIFA WC qualification	Luxembourg	0–4	Russia	Luxembourg City, Luxembourg
		Report	Samedov 9'; Fayzulin 39'; Glushakov 45+2'; Kerzhakov 73'	Stadium: Stade Josy Barthel

15 October 2013 2014 FIFA WC qualification	Azerbaijan	1–1	Russia	Baku, Azerbaijan
	Javadov 90'	Report	Shirokov 16'	Stadium: Eighth Kilometer District Stadium

15 November 2013 Friendly	Russia	1–1	Serbia	Dubai, United Arab Emirates
	Samedov 30'	Report	Đorđević 31'	Stadium: Zabeel Stadium

19 November 2013 Friendly	Russia	2–1	South Korea	Dubai, United Arab Emirates
	Smolov 12'; Tarasov 59'	Report	Kim Shin-wook 6'

=== 2014 ===
5 March 2014 Friendly	Russia	2–0	Armenia	Krasnodar, Russia
	Kokorin 21'; Kombarov 43' (pen.)	Report		Stadium: Kuban Stadium

26 May 2014 Friendly	Russia	1–0	Slovakia	Saint Petersburg, Russia
	Kerzhakov 82'	Report		Stadium: Petrovsky Stadium

31 May 2014 Friendly	Norway	1–1	Russia	Oslo, Norway
	Konradsen 77'	Report	Shatov 3'	Stadium: Ullevaal Stadion

6 June 2014 Friendly	Russia	2–0	Morocco	Moscow, Russia
	Berezutski 29'; Zhirkov 58'	Report		Stadium: Lokomotiv Stadium

17 June 2014 2014 FIFA World Cup	Russia	1–1	South Korea	Cuiabá, Brazil
	Kerzhakov 74'	Report	Lee Keun-ho 68'	Stadium: Arena Pantanal

22 June 2014 2014 FIFA World Cup	Belgium	1–0	Russia	Rio de Janeiro, Brazil
	Origi 88'	Report		Stadium: Estádio do Maracanã

26 June 2014 2014 FIFA World Cup	Algeria	1–1	Russia	Curitiba, Brazil
	Slimani 60'	Report	Kokorin 6'	Stadium: Arena da Baixada

3 September 2014 Friendly	Russia	4–0	Azerbaijan	Khimki, Russia
	Kerzhakov 6', 11'; Ignashevich 41'; Granat 80'	Report		Stadium: Arena Khimki

8 September 2014 UEFA Euro 2016 qualifying	Russia	4–0	Liechtenstein	Khimki, Russia
	Büchel 4' (o.g.); Burgmeier 50' (o.g.); Kombarov 54' (pen.); Dzyuba 65'	Report		Stadium: Arena Khimki

9 October 2014 UEFA Euro 2016 qualifying	Sweden	1–1	Russia	Solna, Sweden
	Toivonen 49'	Report	Kokorin 10'	Stadium: Friends Arena

12 October 2014 UEFA Euro 2016 qualifying	Russia	1–1	Moldova	Moscow, Russia
	Dzyuba 73' (pen.)	Report	Epureanu 74'	Stadium: Otkrytiye Arena

15 November 2014 UEFA Euro 2016 qualifying	Austria	1–0	Russia	Vienna, Austria
	Okotie 73'	Report		Stadium: Ernst-Happel-Stadion

18 November 2014 Friendly	Hungary	1–2	Russia	Budapest, Hungary
	Nikolić 86'	Report	Ignashevich 49'; Kerzhakov 80'	Stadium: Ferenc Puskás Stadium

=== 2015 ===
27 March 2015 UEFA Euro 2016 qualifying	Montenegro	0–3; Awarded (Note: The Montenegro v Russia match was awarded as a 3–0 win to Russia after it was abandoned in the 67th minute due to crowd violence and a scuffle between players. The score was 0–0 and Russia missed a penalty moments before the match was abandoned. This was the second delay of the match as in the first minute Russian goalkeeper Igor Akinfeev was hit by a flare thrown from the crowd and stretchered off, causing a 33-minute delay. Montenegro also had to play their next home qualifying game behind closed doors, and the Montenegrin and Russian FAs were fined €50,000 and €25,000 respectively.)	Russia	Podgorica, Montenegro
		Report		Stadium: Podgorica City Stadium

31 March 2015 Friendly	Russia	0–0	Kazakhstan	Khimki, Russia
		Report		Stadium: Arena Khimki

7 June 2015 Friendly	Russia	4–2	Belarus	Khimki, Russia
	Kokorin 20'; Golovin 77'; Miranchuk 83'; Kerzhakov 90+2'	Report	Kislyak 51', 66'	Stadium: Arena Khimki

14 June 2015 UEFA Euro 2016 qualifying	Russia	0–1	Austria	Moscow, Russia
		Report	Janko 33'	Stadium: Otkrytiye Arena

5 September 2015 UEFA Euro 2016 qualifying	Russia	1–0	Sweden	Moscow, Russia
	Dzyuba 38'	Report		Stadium: Otkrytiye Arena

8 September 2015 UEFA Euro 2016 qualifying	Liechtenstein	0–7	Russia	Vaduz, Liechtenstein
		Report	Dzyuba 21', 45', 73', 90'; Kokorin 40' (pen.); Smolov 77'; Dzagoev 85'	Stadium: Rheinpark Stadion

9 October 2015 UEFA Euro 2016 qualifying	Moldova	1–2	Russia	Chișinău, Moldova
	Cebotaru 85'	Report	Ignashevich 58'; Dzyuba 78'	Stadium: Zimbru Stadium

12 October 2015 UEFA Euro 2016 qualifying	Russia	2–0	Montenegro	Moscow, Russia
	Kuzmin 33'; Kokorin 37' (pen.)	Report		Stadium: Otkrytiye Arena

14 November 2015 Friendly	Russia	1–0	Portugal	Krasnodar, Russia
	Shirokov 89'	Report		Stadium: Kuban Stadium

17 November 2015 Friendly	Russia	1–3	Croatia	Rostov-on-Don, Russia
	Smolov 14'	Report	Kalinić 57'; Brozović 60'; Mandžukić 82'	Stadium: Olimp-2

=== 2016 ===
26 March 2016 Friendly	Russia	3–0	Lithuania	Moscow, Russia
	Smolov 41'; Golovin 61'; Glushakov 72'	Report		Stadium: Otkritie Arena

29 March 2016 Friendly	France	4–2	Russia	Saint-Denis, France
	Kanté 8'; Gignac 38'; Payet 64'; Coman 76'	Report	Kokorin 56'; Zhirkov 68'	Stadium: Stade de France

1 June 2016 Friendly	Czech Republic	2–1	Russia	Innsbruck, Austria
	Rosický 50'; Necid 90'	Report	Kokorin 6'	Stadium: Tivoli-Neu

5 June 2016 Friendly	Serbia	1–1	Russia	Monte Carlo, Monaco
	Mitrović 88'	Report	Dzyuba 85'	Stadium: Stade Louis II

11 June 2016 UEFA Euro 2016	England	1–1	Russia	Marseille, France
	Dier 73'	Report	Berezutski 90+2'	Stadium: Stade Vélodrome

15 June 2016 UEFA Euro 2016	Russia	1–2	Slovakia	Villeneuve-d'Ascq, France
	Glushakov 80'	Report	Weiss 32'; Hamšík 45'	Stadium: Stade Pierre-Mauroy

20 June 2016 UEFA Euro 2016	Russia	0–3	Wales	Toulouse, France
		Report	Ramsey 11'; Taylor 20'; Bale 67'	Stadium: Stadium de Toulouse

31 August 2016 Friendly	Turkey	0–0	Russia	Antalya, Turkey
		Report		Stadium: Antalya Stadyumu

6 September 2016 Friendly	Russia	1–0	Ghana	Moscow, Russia
	Smolov 20'	Report		Stadium: Lokomotiv Stadium

9 October 2016 Friendly	Russia	3–4	Costa Rica	Krasnodar, Russia
	Samedov 31'; Dzyuba 48', 61'	Report	Azofeifa 22'; Ruiz 29'; Berezutski 45+2' (o.g.); Campbell 90+2' (pen.)	Stadium: Krasnodar Stadium

10 November 2016 Friendly	Qatar	2–1	Russia	Doha, Qatar
	Khoukhi 35' (pen.); Boudiaf 72'	Report	Samedov 5' (pen.)	Stadium: Doha Stadium

15 November 2016 Friendly	Russia	1–0	Romania	Grozny, Russia
	Ozdoev 90+3'	Report		Stadium: Akhmat-Arena

=== 2017 ===
24 March 2017 Friendly	Russia	0–2	Ivory Coast	Krasnodar, Russia
		Report	Kodjia 30'; Zaha 70'	Stadium: Krasnodar Stadium

28 March 2017 Friendly	Russia	3–3	Belgium	Sochi, Russia
	Vasin 3'; Miranchuk 74'; Bukharov 90+2'	Report	Mirallas 17'; Benteke 42', 45'	Stadium: Fisht Olympic Stadium

5 June 2017 Friendly	Hungary	0–3	Russia	Budapest, Hungary
		Report	Smolov 20'; Eppel 40' (o.g.); Poloz 89'	Stadium: Groupama Arena

9 June 2017 Friendly	Russia	1–1	Chile	Moscow, Russia
	Vasin 67'	Report	Isla 56'	Stadium: VEB Arena

17 June 2017 2017 FIFA Confederations Cup	Russia	2–0	New Zealand	Saint Petersburg, Russia
	Boxall 31' (o.g.); Smolov 69'	Report		Stadium: Krestovsky Stadium

21 June 2017 2017 FIFA Confederations Cup	Russia	0–1	Portugal	Moscow, Russia
		Report	Ronaldo 8'	Stadium: Otkritie Arena

21 June 2017 2017 FIFA Confederations Cup	Mexico	2–1	Russia	Kazan, Russia
	Araujo 30'; Lozano 52'	Report	Samedov 25'	Stadium: Kazan Arena

7 October 2017 Friendly	Russia	4–2	South Korea	Moscow, Russia
	Smolov 45'; Kim Ju-young 55', 57' (o.g.); Miranchuk 83'	Report	Kwon Kyung-won 87'; Ji Dong-won 90+3'	Stadium: VEB Arena

10 October 2017 Friendly	Russia	1–1	Iran	Kazan, Russia
	Poloz 74'	Report	Azmoun 57'	Stadium: Kazan Arena

11 November 2017 Friendly	Russia	0–1	Argentina	Moscow, Russia
		Report	Agüero 86'	Stadium: Luzhniki Stadium

14 November 2017 Friendly	Russia	3–3	Spain	Saint Petersburg, Russia
	Smolov 41', 70'; Miranchuk 51'	Report	Alba 9'; Ramos 35' (pen.), 54' (pen.)	Stadium: Krestovsky Stadium

=== 2018 ===
23 March 2018 Friendly	Russia	0–3	Brazil	Moscow, Russia
		Report	Miranda 53'; Coutinho 62'; Paulinho 66'	Stadium: Luzhniki Stadium

27 March 2018 Friendly	Russia	1–3	France	Saint Petersburg, Russia
	Smolov 68'	Report	Mbappé 40', 83'; Pogba 48'	Stadium: Krestovsky Stadium

30 May 2018 Friendly	Austria	1–0	Russia	Innsbruck, Austria
	Schöpf 28'	Report		Stadium: Tivoli-Neu

5 June 2018 Friendly	Russia	1–1	Turkey	Moscow, Russia
	Samedov 36'	Report	Mallı 60'	Stadium: VEB Arena

14 June 2018 2018 FIFA World Cup	Russia	5–0	Saudi Arabia	Moscow, Russia
	Gazinsky 12'; Cheryshev 43', 90+1'; Dzyuba 71'; Golovin 90+4'	Report		Stadium: Luzhniki Stadium

19 June 2018 2018 FIFA World Cup	Russia	3–1	Egypt	Saint Petersburg, Russia
	Fathy 47' (o.g.); Cheryshev 59'; Dzyuba 62'	Report	Salah 73' (pen.)	Stadium: Krestovsky Stadium

25 June 2018 2018 FIFA World Cup	Uruguay	3–0	Russia	Samara, Russia
	Suárez 10'; Cheryshev 23' (o.g.); Cavani 90'	Report		Stadium: Cosmos Arena

1 July 2018 2018 FIFA World Cup	Spain	1–1 (a.e.t.) (3–4 p)	Russia	Moscow, Russia
	Ignashevich 12' (o.g.)	Report	Dzyuba 41' (pen.)	Stadium: Luzhniki Stadium
	Penalties
	Iniesta (penalty scored); Piqué (penalty scored); Koke (penalty missed); Ramos (penalty scored); Aspas (penalty missed)		(penalty scored) Smolov; (penalty scored) Ignashevich; (penalty scored) Golovin; (penalty scored) Cheryshev

7 July 2018 2018 FIFA World Cup	Russia	2–2 (a.e.t.) (3–4 p)	Croatia	Sochi, Russia
	Cheryshev 31'; Fernandes 115'	Report	Kramarić 39'; Vida 101'	Stadium: Fisht Olympic Stadium
	Penalties
	Smolov (penalty missed); Dzagoev (penalty scored); Fernandes (penalty missed); Ignashevich (penalty scored); Kuzyayev (penalty scored)		(penalty scored) Brozović; (penalty missed) Kovačić; (penalty scored) Modrić; (penalty scored) Vida; (penalty scored) Rakitić

7 September 2018 2018–19 UEFA Nations League	Turkey	1–2	Russia	Trabzon, Turkey
	Aziz 41'	Report	Cheryshev 13'; Dzyuba 49'	Stadium: Şenol Güneş Stadium

10 September 2018 Friendly	Russia	5–1	Czech Republic	Rostov-on-Don, Russia
	Ionov 8', 29'; Zabolotny 24'; Yerokhin 79'; Poloz 83'	Report	Souček 74'	Stadium: Rostov Arena

11 October 2018 2018–19 UEFA Nations League	Russia	0–0	Sweden	Kaliningrad, Russia
		Report		Stadium: Kaliningrad Stadium

14 October 2018 2018–19 UEFA Nations League	Russia	2–0	Turkey	Sochi, Russia
	Neustädter 20'; Cheryshev 78'	Report		Stadium: Fisht Olympic Stadium

15 November 2018 Friendly	Germany	3–0	Russia	Leipzig, Germany
	Sané 8'; Süle 25'; Gnabry 40'	Report		Stadium: Red Bull Arena

20 November 2018 2018–19 UEFA Nations League	Sweden	2–0	Russia	Solna, Sweden
	Lindelöf 41'; Berg 72'	Report		Stadium: Friends Arena

=== 2019 ===
21 March 2019 UEFA Euro 2020 qualifying	Belgium	3–1	Russia	Brussels, Belgium
	Tielemans 14'; Hazard 45' (pen.), 88'	Report	Cheryshev 16'	Stadium: King Baudouin Stadium; Attendance: 34,245; Referee: Ovidiu Hațegan (Romania)

24 March 2019 UEFA Euro 2020 qualifying	Kazakhstan	0–4	Russia	Nur-Sultan, Kazakhstan
		Report	Cheryshev 19', 45+2'; Dzyuba 52'; Beisebekov 62' (o.g.)	Stadium: Astana Arena; Attendance: 29,582; Referee: Slavko Vinčić (Slovenia)

8 June 2019 UEFA Euro 2020 qualifying	Russia	9–0	San Marino	Saransk, Russia
	Cevoli 25' (o.g.); Dzyuba 31' (pen.), 73', 76', 88'; Kudryashov 36'; An. Miranchuk 41'; Smolov 77', 83'	Report		Stadium: Mordovia Arena; Attendance: 42,241; Referee: Mohammed Al-Hakim (Sweden)

11 June 2019 UEFA Euro 2020 qualifying	Russia	1–0	Cyprus	Nizhny Novgorod, Russia
	Ionov 38'	Report		Stadium: Nizhny Novgorod Stadium; Attendance: 42,228; Referee: Marco Di Bello (Italy)

6 September 2019 UEFA Euro 2020 qualifying	Scotland	1–2	Russia	Glasgow, Scotland
	McGinn 11'	Report	Dzyuba 40'; O'Donnell 59' (o.g.)	Stadium: Hampden Park; Attendance: 32,432; Referee: Anastasios Sidiropoulos (Greece)

9 September 2019 UEFA Euro 2020 qualifying	Russia	1–0	Kazakhstan	Kaliningrad, Russia
	Fernandes 89'	Report		Stadium: Kaliningrad Stadium; Attendance: 31,818; Referee: Nikola Dabanović (Montenegro)

10 October 2019 UEFA Euro 2020 qualifying	Russia	4–0	Scotland	Moscow, Russia
	Dzyuba 57', 70'; Ozdoyev 60'; Golovin 84'	Report		Stadium: Luzhniki Stadium; Referee: Jakob Kehlet (Denmark)

13 October 2019 UEFA Euro 2020 qualifying	Cyprus	0–5	Russia	Nicosia, Cyprus
		Report	Cheryshev 9', 90+2'; Ozdoyev 23'; Dzyuba 79'; Golovin 89'	Stadium: GSP Stadium; Referee: Srđan Jovanović (Serbia)

16 November 2019 UEFA Euro 2020 qualifying	Russia	1–4	Belgium	Saint Petersburg, Russia
	Dzhikiya 79'	Report	T. Hazard 19'; E. Hazard 33', 40'; Lukaku 72'	Stadium: Krestovsky Stadium; Referee: Artur Soares Dias (Portugal)

19 November 2019 UEFA Euro 2020 qualifying	San Marino	0–5	Russia	Serravalle, San Marino
20:45		Report	Kuzyayev 3'; Petrov 19'; Miranchuk 49'; Ionov 56'; Komlichenko 78'	Stadium: San Marino Stadium; Referee: Thorvaldur Árnason (Iceland)

== Venues in Russia ==
Included 2017 Confederations Cup and 2018 World Cup Russia matches

	City	Times
1	Moscow	91
2	Saint Petersburg	13
3	(Krasnodar Krai) Krasnodar	6
4	(Moscow Oblast) Khimki	4
5	(Tatarstan) Kazan	3
5	(Krasnodar Krai) Sochi	3
7	(Kaliningrad Oblast) Kaliningrad	2
7	(Rostov Oblast) Rostov-on-Don	2

	City	Times
8	(Chechnya) Grozny	1
8	(Nizhny Novgorod Oblast) Nizhny Novgorod	1
8	(Samara Oblast) Samara	1
8	(Mordovia) Saransk	1
8	(Tula Oblast) Tula	1
8	(Volgograd Oblast) Volgograd	1
8	(Voronezh Oblast) Voronezh	1

== Head to head record ==
Opponent	Pld	W	D	L	GF	GA	GD	Win %
Albania	2	1	0	1	5	4	+1	50.00
Algeria	1	0	1	0	1	1	+0	0.00
Andorra	6	6	0	0	21	2	+19	100.00
Argentina	2	0	0	2	2	4	−2	0.00
Armenia	5	4	1	0	10	1	+9	80.00
Austria	5	1	1	3	3	3	+0	20.00
Azerbaijan	5	3	2	0	9	2	+7	60.00
Belgium	7	0	2	5	7	16	−9	0.00
Belarus	4	2	2	0	8	4	+4	50.00
Brazil	6	2	0	4	4	14	−10	33.33
Bulgaria	4	2	1	1	7	5	+2	50.00
Cameroon	2	1	1	0	6	1	+5	50.00
Chile	1	0	1	0	1	1	+0	0.00
Costa Rica	1	0	0	1	3	4	−1	0.00
Croatia	4	0	3	1	3	5	−2	0.00
Cyprus	5	4	1	0	12	1	+11	80.00
Czech Republic	4	2	1	1	13	7	+6	50.00
Denmark	1	1	0	0	2	0	+2	100.00
Egypt	1	1	0	0	3	1	+2	100.00
El Salvador	1	1	0	0	2	1	+1	100.00
England	3	1	1	1	3	5	−2	33.33
Estonia	5	3	1	1	10	3	+7	60.00
Faroe Islands	4	4	0	0	12	2	+10	100.00
FR Yugoslavia	7	2	4	1	6	5	+1	28.57
Finland	4	4	0	0	15	1	+14	100.00
France	7	2	1	4	10	15	−5	28.57
Georgia	3	1	1	1	4	3	+1	33.33
Germany	6	0	1	5	3	12	−9	0.00
Ghana	1	1	0	0	1	0	+1	100.00
Greece	11	4	5	2	13	11	+2	36.36
Hungary	5	4	1	0	12	3	+9	80.00
Iceland	6	4	1	1	8	2	+6	66.67
Iran	2	0	1	1	1	2	−1	0.00
Israel	10	4	3	3	16	3	+13	40.00
Italy	5	1	1	3	5	6	−1	20.00
Ivory Coast	2	0	1	1	1	3	−2	0.00
Japan	1	0	0	1	0	1	−1	0.00
Kazakhstan	4	3	1	0	11	0	+11	75.00
Latvia	4	3	1	0	7	2	+5	75.00
Liechtenstein	6	6	0	0	19	1	+18	100.00
Lithuania	4	3	1	0	11	4	+7	75.00
Luxembourg	10	10	0	0	35	3	+32	100.00
Malta	1	1	0	0	2	0	+2	100.00
Mexico	3	2	0	1	7	3	+4	66.67
Moldova	3	2	1	0	4	2	+2	66.67
Montenegro	2	2	0	0	5	0	+5	100.00
Morocco	1	1	0	0	2	0	+2	100.00
Netherlands	3	1	1	1	5	6	−1	33.33
New Zealand	1	1	0	0	2	0	+2	100.00
North Macedonia	4	4	0	0	7	0	+7	100.00
Northern Ireland	2	1	0	1	2	1	+1	50.00
Norway	2	0	1	1	3	4	−1	0.00
Poland	4	1	2	1	6	6	+0	25.00
Portugal	7	2	1	4	3	11	−8	28.57
Qatar	3	1	1	1	7	5	+2	33.33
Republic of Ireland	7	3	3	1	10	7	+3	42.86
Romania	3	2	0	1	5	5	+0	66.67
San Marino	4	4	0	0	25	0	+25	100.00
Saudi Arabia	2	1	0	1	7	4	+3	50.00
Scotland	4	2	2	0	7	2	+5	50.00
Serbia	4	2	2	0	5	3	+2	50.00
Slovakia	9	3	3	3	8	8	+0	33.33
Slovenia	5	2	1	2	7	6	+1	40.00
South Korea	3	2	1	0	7	4	+3	66.67
Spain	7	0	3	4	5	11	−6	0.00
Sweden	8	2	3	3	6	8	−2	25.00
Switzerland	5	4	1	0	13	4	+9	80.00
Tunisia	1	1	0	0	2	0	+2	100.00
Turkey	6	4	0	2	5	2	+3	66.67
Ukraine	2	0	1	1	3	4	−1	0.00
United Arab Emirates	1	1	0	0	1	0	+1	100.00
United States	5	2	3	0	6	3	+3	40.00
Uruguay	2	0	1	1	1	4	−3	0.00
Wales	5	3	1	1	6	5	+1	60.00
Total: 74 teams played	296	148	74	74	509	282	+227	50.00

== See also ==
- Russia national football team results (2020–present)
