= Aleksandr Filimonov =

Russian footballer

Aleksandr Filimonov Александр Филимонов
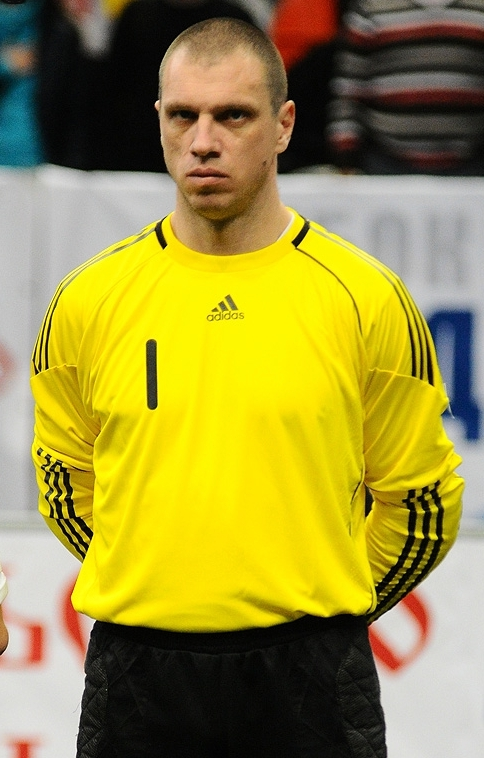

Personal information
- Full name: Aleksandr Vladimirovich Filimonov
- Date of birth: 15 October 1973 (age 53)
- Place of birth: Yoshkar-Ola, USSR
- Height: 1.95 m (6 ft 5 in)
- Position: Goalkeeper

Youth career
- –1990: Burevestnik Yoshkar-Ola

Senior career*
Years	Team	Apps	(Gls)
1990	Stal Cheboksary	2	(0)
1991	Druzhba Yoshkar-Ola	38	(1)
1992–1993	Fakel Voronezh	67	(0)
1994–1995	Tekstilshchik Kamyshin	53	(0)
1996–2001	Spartak Moscow	147	(0)
1996–2000	→ Spartak-2 Moscow	2	(0)
2001	Dynamo Kyiv	4	(0)
2001	→ Dynamo-2 Kyiv	1	(0)
2002–2003	Uralan Elista	39	(0)
2004–2006	Moscow	26	(0)
2007–2008	Nea Salamis	12	(0)
2008	Kuban Krasnodar	16	(0)
2009–2010	Lokomotiv Tashkent	47	(0)
2012–2015	Arsenal Tula	75	(0)
2015–2018	Dolgoprudny	28	(0)
Total		557	(1)

International career
1995	Russia U21	5	(0)
1998–2002	Russia	16	(0)
2004	Russia-2	1	(0)
2011–2012	Russia (beach soccer)		
Medal record
Representing Russia
Men's Beach Soccer
FIFA Beach Soccer World Cup
Winner	2011 Ravenna
- * Club domestic league appearances and goals

Aleksandr Vladimirovich Filimonov (Russian: Александр Владимирович Филимонов; born 15 October 1973) is a Russian former association football goalkeeper He won the 2011 FIFA Beach Soccer World Cup with the Russia national beach soccer team.

During his professional career, he was best known for playing for Spartak Moscow and the Russia national football team, as well as for the accidental goal he conceded in Euro 2000 qualifying playoffs from Andriy Shevchenko.

== Early life and career ==
Born in Yoshkar-Ola, Filimonov spent his early years elsewhere in the USSR. He was interested in football from an early age since his father was a football coach.

After finishing with the Burevestnik football academy in Yoshkar-Ola, he moved to his first adult football team in summer 1990 – Stal Cheboksary, from the Soviet Second League B. As a seventeen-year-old, he was only able to make two appearances in the season. That winter, he returned to Yoshkar-Ola and joined local team Druzhba Yoshkar-Ola to take part in the 1991 Soviet Second League B tournament. Soon Filimonov established himself as the first-choice goalkeeper for Druzhba and started 38 matches. He also scored a goal, which would prove to be the only one of his adult career.

As the 1991 season neared its end, the Soviet Union disbanded. At the beginning of 1992 Filimonov joined Fakel Voronezh, which unexpectedly joined the newly formed Russian Premier League, despite having finished mid-table in the Soviet First League. Despite his efforts, Fakel were relegated in their first season. Filimonov spent another season with Fakel in the Russian First League before moving to the Russian Premier League top-half team Tekstilshchik Kamyshin, having achieved 20 clean sheets in 37 matches in 1993, and a total of 71 appearances for Fakel.

At Tekstilshchik, Filimonov quickly established himself as first-team keeper and played his first European club tournament matches in 1994 in the UEFA Cup, against Nantes and Békéscsaba. Over the course of two seasons with Tekstilshchik, Filimonov became regarded as one of the most promising Russian keepers, and on 6 June 1995, he debuted for the Russian U23 national team against San Marino and earned three U23 caps in autumn 1995.

== Spartak Moscow ==
Filimonov's contract with Tekstilshchik expired in 1996, and the club's financial situation prevented them from renewing it. At the time, Spartak Moscow was looking for a new keeper to replace Stanislav Cherchesov, who had left for Wacker Innsbruck. Spartak had signed Ruslan Nigmatullin but also signed Filimonov to increase their squad's depth. Initially, Filimonov acted as backup for Nigmatullin and missed the opportunity to play in the UEFA Champions League, but over the course of his first season there, Filimonov became first-choice keeper again, as Georgi Yartsev preferred Filimonov's demonstrated consistency.

For most of the remainder of his career with Spartak, Filimonov was preferred for the club's starting XI. When he left the club in summer 2001, he had won six league titles, played in numerous Champions League games (including a 4–1 win over Arsenal), and became an established member of the Russian national team. By that time, Maksym Levytsky had become the club's preferred starting keeper.

== Later career ==
After leaving Spartak, Filimonov was transferred to Dynamo Kyiv to cover for Oleksandr Shovkovskyi, who had picked up a serious injury. He made few appearances, as Vitaliy Reva became the preferred replacement for Shovkovskyi. Immediately after his Dynamo contract ended, he returned to Russia to play for Uralan Elista. After two seasons with Uralan, he was signed by Moscow. During the first half of the 2004 season, he featured regularly for Moscow, but by 2005, he was the club's third choice keeper and made no appearances.

In January 2007, Filimonov joined Cypriot side Nea Salamina. Before retiring from professional football, he also played for Kuban Krasnodar in Russia and Lokomotiv Tashkent in Uzbekistan.

In 2009, he was part of the Russia squad that won the 2009 Legends Cup, a tournament for retired players 35 and older.

In 2011, Filimonov switched to beach soccer and joined Lokomotiv Moscow, with whom he won a national title and super cup. His success in beach soccer earned him an invitation to the national team, with whom he won the 2011 FIFA Beach Soccer World Cup.

He subsequently returned to the Russian Football Premier League in the 2014–15 season at the age of 41 with Arsenal Tula, a team managed by his former Spartak and Russia teammate Dmitri Alenichev, after achieving three consecutive promotions from the fourth tier to the top tier. However, he lost his starting spot for Arsenal in the second half of the season and signed with the third-tier PFL team Dolgoprudny for the 2015–16 season. He retired as a player upon the conclusion of the 2017–18 season, being the last active player of Soviet Union Football Championship.

== International career ==
Filimonov gained his first cap for the Russian national team on 25 March 1998 in a friendly match against France. He played four friendlies in 1998 but was not the main national keeper under managers Boris Ignatyev and Anatoly Byshovets. This changed when Oleg Romantsev, who had managed him at Spartak, became the national manager. Filimonov was the primary keeper of the Russian squad during Euro 2000 qualifying, where the team had an impressive run, including a 3–2 victory against France at the Stade de France on 5 June 1999.

A turning point in Filimonov's career occurred during Russia's match against Ukraine on 9 October 1999, where a win for Russia would qualify them for the Euro 2000 playoffs. Post-Soviet rivalry between Russia and Ukraine made this a highly anticipated match, resulting in Luzhniki Stadium being sold out for the first time in fifteen years. During the match, Russia dominated possession, but no goals came until the 75th minute, when Valery Karpin scored for Russia from a free kick. But at the 88th minute, Ukraine were awarded a free kick far from goal at the left edge of the field. Andriy Shevchenko kicked the ball straight at the hands of Filimonov, but Filimonov was not ready for the kick and conceded a goal. The match ended 1–1, and France qualified from the group while Ukraine went to the playoffs at Russia's expense.

Subsequently, Filimonov won another four caps for Russia, but only in friendlies. He did not play for Russia in any other competitive game. He was named in Russia's 2002 World Cup squad, but was not used in favor of his former Spartak teammate Ruslan Nigmatullin.

== Honours ==
- Russian Premier League: 1996, 1997, 1998, 1999, 2000, 2001
- Russian Cup: 1998
- Legends Cup: 2009
- FIFA Beach Soccer World Cup: 2011
- Russian Beach Soccer League: 2011
- Russian Beach Soccer Super Cup: 2011

== Career statistics ==
Club	Season	League			Cup		Continental		Other		Total	
Club	Season	Division	Apps	Goals	Apps	Goals	Apps	Goals	Apps	Goals	Apps	Goals
Stal Cheboksary	1990	Soviet Second League B	2	0	–		–		–		2	0
Druzhba Yoshkar-Ola	1991	Soviet Second League B	38	1	0	0	–		–		38	1
Fakel Voronezh	1992	Russian Premier League	30	0	2	0	–		–		32	0
Fakel Voronezh	1993	Russian First League	37	0	2	0	–		–		39	0
Fakel Voronezh	Total		67	0	4	0	0	0	0	0	71	0
Tekstilshchik Kamyshin	1994	Russian Premier League	23	0	2	0	4 (Note: Appearances in the UEFA Cup)	0	–		29	0
Tekstilshchik Kamyshin	1995	Russian Premier League	30	0	1	0	–		–		31	0
Tekstilshchik Kamyshin	Total		53	0	3	0	4	0	0	0	60	0
Spartak Moscow	1996	Russian Premier League	26	0	3	0	4	0	–		33	0
Spartak Moscow	1997	Russian Premier League	33	0	4	0	8 (Note: Two appearances in the UEFA Champions League, six appearances in the UEFA Cup)	0	–		45	0
Spartak Moscow	1998	Russian Premier League	29	0	5	0	12 (Note: Eight appearances in the UEFA Champions League, four appearances in the UEFA Cup)	0	–		46	0
Spartak Moscow	1999	Russian Premier League	28	0	1	0	10 (Note: Eight appearances in the UEFA Champions League, two appearances in the UEFA Cup)	0	–		39	0
Spartak Moscow	2000	Russian Premier League	23	0	3	0	8 (Note: Appearances in the UEFA Champions League)	0	–		34	0
Spartak Moscow	2001	Russian Premier League	8	0	1	0	4	0	–		13	0
Spartak Moscow	Total		147	0	17	0	46	0	0	0	210	0
Spartak-2 Moscow	1996	Russian Third League	1	0	–		–		–		1	0
Spartak-2 Moscow	2000	Russian Second League	1	0	–		–		–		1	0
Spartak-2 Moscow	Total		2	0	0	0	0	0	0	0	2	0
Dynamo Kyiv	2001–02	Ukrainian Premier League	4	0	1	0	5	0	–		10	0
Dynamo-2 Kyiv	2001–02	Ukrainian First League	1	0	–		–		–		1	0
Uralan Elista	2002	Russian Premier League	23	0	1	0	–		–		24	0
Uralan Elista	2003	Russian Premier League	16	0	0	0	–		1 (Note: Appearance in the Russian Premier League Cup)	0	17	0
Uralan Elista	Total		39	0	1	0	0	0	1	0	41	0
Moscow	2004	Russian Premier League	26	0	6	0	–		–		32	0
Moscow	2005	Russian Premier League	0	0	0	0	–		–		0	0
Moscow	2006	Russian Premier League	0	0	1	0	0	0	–		1	0
Moscow	Total		26	0	7	0	0	0	0	0	33	0
Nea Salamis	2006–07	Cypriot First Division	4	0	–		–		–		4	0
Nea Salamis	2007–08	Cypriot First Division	8	0	–		–		–		8	0
Nea Salamis	Total		12	0	0	0	0	0	0	0	12	0
Kuban Krasnodar	2008	Russian First League	16	0	0	0	–		–		16	0
Lokomotiv Tashkent	2009	Uzbekistan Super League	25	0	0	0	–		–		25	0
Lokomotiv Tashkent	2010	Uzbekistan Super League	22	0	2	0	–		–		24	0
Lokomotiv Tashkent	Total		47	0	2	0	0	0	0	0	49	0
Arsenal Tula	2011–12	LFL	–		–		–		–		10	0
Arsenal Tula	2012–12	Russian Second League	28	0	1	0	–		–		29	0
Arsenal Tula	2013–14	Russian First League	30	0	1	0	–		2 (Note: Appearances in the FNL Cup)	0	33	0
Arsenal Tula	2014–15	Russian Premier League	17	0	2	0	–		–		19	0
Arsenal Tula	Total		75	0	4	0	0	0	2	0	81	0
Dolgoprudny	2015–16	Russian Second League	11	0	0	0	–		–		11	0
Dolgoprudny	2016–17	Russian Second League	15	0	0	0	–		–		15	0
Dolgoprudny	2017–18	Russian Second League	2	0	0	0	–		–		2	0
Dolgoprudny	Total		28	0	0	0	0	0	0	0	28	0
Career total			557	1	39	0	55	0	3	0	654	1
