= 2009 Legends Cup =

2009 Legends Cup was the first edition of the Legends Cup, a tournament for senior retired players (35+). The teams invited to the tournament were Russia, Netherlands, France, Spain, Portugal and Italy. The first edition of the Legends Cup, which took place from January 31 to February 1, 2009, in Moscow in the Ice Palace "Megasport".

All of the matches were held in the Khodynka Arena, Moscow, Russia.

== Background ==
The organizer of the tournament which featured European stars was the sports agency NewSport. The tournament was held with the support of the Russian Football Union, the Government of Moscow and the State Duma of the Russian Federation. Accommodation and customer service – at the Marriott Grand Hotel, which was also the headquarters of the 2008 Champions League final in Moscow. All the games of the tournament took place in the Megasport Sport Palace on the Khodynka Field.

== Regulations ==
The tournament was held in two stages: qualifying games in the subgroups and the final part, drawing places from 1 to 6. On the first day of the tournament on January 31 (Saturday) qualifying games were held in groups, each group consisted of three teams. Games in groups were held in a circular system, each team played 2 games.

The duration of one match was 40 minutes, two halves of 20 minutes, a break between halves – 10 minutes. The game was conducted according to the 6-a side scheme: 5 in the field + goalkeeper. The size of the ball is No. 5. The size of the platform is 48 × 24 meters, the size of the gate is 5 × 2 meters.

For the victory, 3 points were awarded, a draw – 1, a defeat – 0. In case of equality of points, two or more teams took into account the following indicators: the results of matches among themselves, the number of wins, the difference of goals scored and conceded, more goals scored. In case of equality of all these indicators – by lot.

On the second day of the tournament, on February 1 (Sunday), the games of the final stage took place. The teams that took the 3rd place in the groups played 5-6 places. Teams that took the 2nd place in the groups, played 3-4 places. The teams that took the first place in the groups played in the finals.

Determination of the winner in the games of the final stage with equal score occurred through a series of post-match penalties – five hits from each team, with a draw result – further to the first miss.

== Squads ==
Italy: Marco Ballotta, Amedeo Carboni, Lorenzo Amoruso, Demetrio Albertini, Maurizio Ganz, Dario Marcolin, Angelo Carbone, Alessandro Romano, Diego Bonavina

France: Guillaume Warmuz, Christian Karembeu, William Ayache, Patrice Loko, Martin Djetou, Jean-Pierre Cyprien, Jean-Marc Chanelet

Spain: Toni Jiménez, Jon Andoni Goikoetxea, Guillermo Amor, José Amavisca, Ángel Cuéllar, Cristóbal Parralo, Enrique Romero, Julen Guerrero, Fran, Paco Jémez

Portugal: Neno, Paulo Futre, João Pinto, Jorge Costa, Sá Pinto, José Dominguez, Hugo Porfírio, Oceano da Cruz, Hélder, Carlos Xavier, Dimas, Fernando Gomes

Netherlands: Ronald de Boer, Pierre van Hooijdonk, Richard Witschge, Danny Muller, Frank Verlaat, Regi Blinker, Peter Hoekstra, Bert Konterman

Russia: Aleksandr Filimonov, Viktor Onopko, Yuriy Nikiforov, Dmitri Popov, Dmitri Ananko, Akhrik Tsveiba, Dmitri Alenichev, Valeri Karpin, Igor Simutenkov, Konstantin Yeryomenko, Sergei Yuran, Igor Korneev, Dmitry Kuznetsov, Sergei Kiriakov

Famous football players and coaches were invited to the tournament as guests, such as Eusébio, Franco Baresi, Fabio Capello, Oliver Kahn, Michael Rummenigge, Rinat Dasayev and other European football legends.

== Results ==
January 31, 2009

Russia	10–2	France

Moscow

Spain	5–4	Netherlands

Moscow

January 31, 2009

Italy	6–3	France

Moscow

Portugal	7–3	Netherlands

Moscow

January 31, 2009

Russia	7–3	Italy

Moscow

Spain	4–3	Portugal

Moscow

== Standings ==
=== Group A ===
Team	Pld	W	D	L	GF	GA	GD	Pts
Spain	2	2	0	0	9	7	+2	6
Portugal	2	1	0	1	10	7	+3	3
Netherlands	2	0	0	2	7	12	-5	0

=== Group B ===
Team	Pld	W	D	L	GF	GA	GD	Pts
Russia	2	2	0	0	17	5	+12	6
Italy	2	1	0	1	9	10	-1	3
France	2	0	0	2	5	16	-11	0

== Matches defining places ==
=== 3-4 places match ===
February 1, 2009

Italy	7–5	Portugal

Moscow

=== 5-6 places match ===
February 1, 2009

Netherlands	9–7	France

Moscow

== Final ==
February 1, 2009

Russia	8–4	Spain
Alenichev 5', 20'; Eremenko 11', 20'; Karpin 13'; Yuran 15', 35'; Kiriakov 18'		Amavisca 15', 37', 38', 40'

Moscow

Legends Cup Champions:

Russia
First title

== Top scorers ==
(Netherlands) Pierre van Hooijdonk, (Portugal) Sá Pinto, (Italy) Maurizio Ganz – 9 goals each

(Spain) José Amavisca, (Russia) Dmitri Alenichev, (Russia) Sergei Yuran – 5 goals each
