= Legends Cup =

Legends Cup could refer to:

- Legends Cup (LFL), the championship game of the Legends Football League (formerly Lingerie Football League)
- Legends Cup (Russia), annual Russian football tournament for senior retired football players
