= Yuriy Nikiforov =

Ukrainian footballer

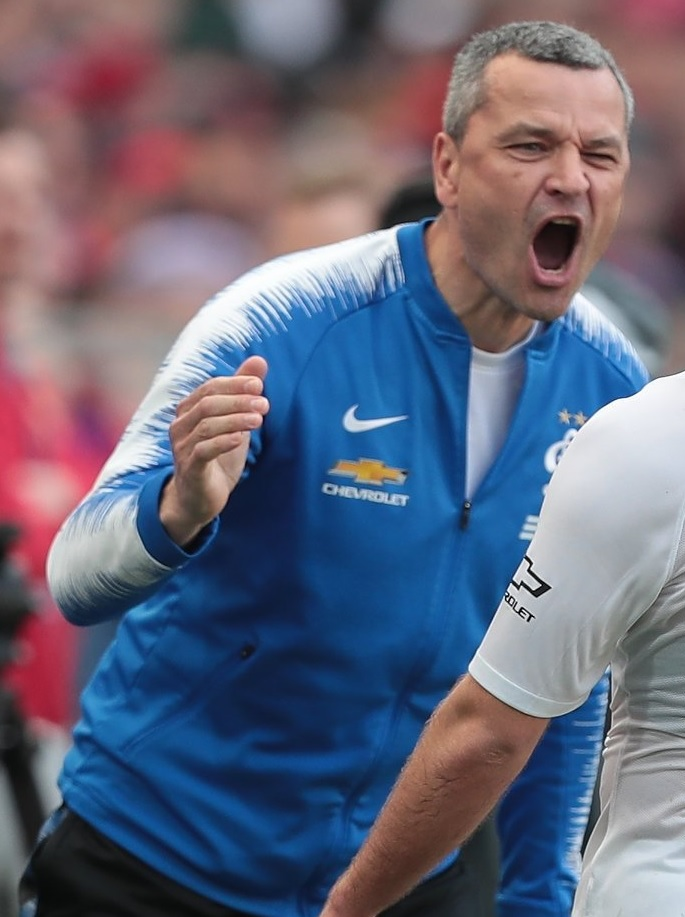
- Nikiforov as coach of Dynamo Moscow in 2019

Personal information
- Full name: Yuriy Valeryevich Nikiforov
- Date of birth: 16 September 1970 (age 56)
- Place of birth: Odesa, Ukrainian SSR (now Ukraine)
- Height: 1.88 m (6 ft 2 in)
- Position: Centre-back

Team information
- Current team: Russia (assistant coach)

Youth career
- Chornomorets Odesa

Senior career*
Years	Team	Apps	(Gls)
1986–1987	Chornomorets Odesa	0	(0)
1987	SKA Odesa	5	(0)
1988	Chornomorets Odesa	1	(0)
1988–1989	Dynamo Kyiv	0	(0)
1990–1993	Chornomorets Odesa	76	(4)
1993–1996	Spartak Moscow	85	(16)
1993	Spartak-d Moscow	3	(2)
1996–1998	Sporting Gijón	65	(2)
1998–2002	PSV	99	(5)
2002–2003	RKC	23	(1)
2003–2004	Urawa Red Diamonds	12	(0)
Total		369	(30)

International career
1986–1987	Soviet Union U-16		
1990–1991	Soviet Union U-21	5	(0)
1992	CIS	4	(0)
1992	Ukraine	3	(0)
1993–2002	Russia	55	(6)

Managerial career
- 2014–2015: Irtysh Pavlodar (assistant)
- 2015: Kuban Krasnodar (assistant)
- 2017: Dynamo-2 Moscow (assistant)
- 2017: Dynamo Moscow (reserves assistant)
- 2017–2019: Dynamo Moscow (assistant)
- 2022–: Russia (assistant)
Medal record
Men's football
Representing Soviet Union
FIFA U-17 World Cup
Winner	1987 Canada
UEFA European Under-19 Championship
Winner	1988 Czechoslovakia
- * Club domestic league appearances and goals

Yuriy Valeryevich Nikiforov (alternate spelling Valeriovych; Юрий Валерьевич Никифоров, Ukrainian: Юрій Валерійович Никифоров; born 16 September 1970) is a professional football coach and a former player who played mainly as a central defender. He is an assistant coach with the Russia national team.

== Club career ==
Born in Odesa, Ukraine, Soviet Union, Nikiforov started playing professionally with hometown's Chornomorets. After one year with Dynamo Kyiv in which he appeared solely for the reserves in the league, he returned to his first club, playing in the inaugural edition of the Ukrainian Premier League.

In early 1993, Nikiforov moved to Russia with Spartak Moscow, being an instrumental defensive unit as the capital side won three out of four Premier League titles, with the player also netting regularly. His first abroad experience came with Sporting de Gijón, to where he arrived at the same time as former compatriot Dmitri Cheryshev (he would also share team with another Russian while in Asturias, Igor Lediakhov).

After Gijón's relegation from La Liga, Nikiforov played five years in the Netherlands, starting with PSV Eindhoven which he helped to consecutive Eredivisie accolades. For 2002–03, the 32-year-old signed with lowly RKC Waalwijk also in the Dutch top level, with the club finishing in a comfortable ninth place. He finished his career in Japan, after one year with Urawa Red Diamonds.

== International career ==
Nikiforov played four times for the Commonwealth of Independent States in 1992, as the national team that rose from the ashes of the Soviet Union took part in that year's UEFA European Championship – he did not make the squad for the finals. His debut came on 25 January in a 1–0 friendly win over the United States, in Miami.

After briefly representing Ukraine, also in that year, Nikiforov switched to Russia, with which he would participate in two FIFA World Cups – 1994 and 2002 – as well as UEFA Euro 1996 (eight matches in total, but with the national side always exiting in the group stage).

In 2009, Nikiforov was part of the Russian squad that won the Legends Cup.

== Coaching career ==
After retiring, he became a coach, following his former PSV teammate Dmitri Khokhlov as an assistant to FC Kuban Krasnodar and FC Dynamo Moscow in the Russian Premier League.

On 12 August 2022, he was hired as an assistant to Valeri Karpin in the Russia national football team.

== Personal life ==
Nikiforov's older brother, Oleksandr, was also a footballer. He too represented Chornomorets (four different spells), and coincided with Yuri from 1989 to 1990.

== Career statistics ==
=== Club ===
Appearances and goals by club, season and competition
Club	Season	League			Cup		Continental		Other		Total	
Club	Season	Division	Apps	Goals	Apps	Goals	Apps	Goals	Apps	Goals	Apps	Goals
Chornomorets Odesa	1987	Soviet First League	0	0	0	0	–		–		0	0
SKA Odesa	1987	Soviet Second League	5	0	–		–		–		5	0
Chornomorets Odesa	1988	Soviet Top League	1	0	–		–		–		1	0
Dynamo Kyiv	1988	Soviet Top League	0	0	–		–		–		0	0
Dynamo Kyiv	1989	Soviet Top League	0	0	2 (Note: Appearances in the UEFA Cup)	0	–		1 (Note: Appearances in the USSR Federation Cup)	0	3	0
Dynamo Kyiv	Total		0	0	2	0	0	0	1	0	3	0
Chornomorets Odesa	1990	Soviet Top League	17	0	3	0	3	0	4	1	27	1
Chornomorets Odesa	1991	Soviet Top League	30	2	4	1	–		–		34	3
Chornomorets Odesa	1992	Ukrainian Premier League	18	2	6	1	–		–		24	3
Chornomorets Odesa	1992–93	Ukrainian Premier League	11	0	1	0	4 (Note: Appearances in the UEFA Cup Winners' Cup)	4	–		16	4
Chornomorets Odesa	Total		76	4	14	2	7	4	4	1	101	11
Spartak Moscow	1993	Russian Premier League	23	0	2	0	5 (Note: Appearances in the UEFA Champions League)	0	–		30	0
Spartak Moscow	1994	Russian Premier League	26	2	5	0	9	0	–		40	2
Spartak Moscow	1995	Russian Premier League	22	9	2	0	6	3	–		30	12
Spartak Moscow	1996	Russian Premier League	14	5	3	2	2	2	–		19	9
Spartak Moscow	Total		85	16	12	2	22	5	0	0	119	23
Spartak-d Moscow	1993	Russian Second League	3	2	1	0	–		–		4	2
Sporting Gijón	1996–97	La Liga	38	2	3	1	–		–		41	3
Sporting Gijón	1996–97	La Liga	27	0	0	0	–		–		27	0
Sporting Gijón	Total		65	2	3	1	0	0	0	0	68	3
PSV	1998–99	Eredivisie	25	1	4	1	5	0	1 (Note: Appearance in the Johan Cruyff Shield)	0	35	2
PSV	1999–2000	Eredivisie	29	3	1	0	5	0	–		35	3
PSV	2000–01	Eredivisie	26	1	5	0	12 (Note: Six appearances in the UEFA Champions League, six appearances in the UEFA Cup)	0	1	0	44	1
PSV	2001–02	Eredivisie	19	0	3	0	6 (Note: Three appearances in the UEFA Champions League, three appearances in the UEFA Cup)	0	1	0	28	0
PSV	Total		99	5	13	1	28	0	3	0	143	6
RKC	2002–03	Eredivisie	23	1	4	0	–		–		27	1
Urawa Red Diamonds	2003	J1 League	12	0	–		–		4 (Note: Appearances in the J.League Cup)	0	16	0
Career total			369	30	49	6	57	9	12	1	486	46

=== International ===
Appearances and goals by national team and year
National team	Year	Apps	Goals
CIS	1992	4	0
Total		4	0
Ukraine	1992	3	0
Total		3	0
Russia	1993	2	0
Russia	1994	9	2
Russia	1995	8	1
Russia	1996	13	3
Russia	1997	4	0
Russia	1998	4	0
Russia	1999	0	0
Russia	2000	0	0
Russia	2001	7	0
Russia	2002	8	0
Total		55	6

Scores and results list Russia's goal tally first, score column indicates score after each Nikiforov goal.

List of international goals scored by Yuriy Nikiforov
No.	Date	Venue	Opponent	Score	Result	Competition
1	17 August 1994	Wörthersee Stadion, Klagenfurt, Austria	Austria	2–0	3–0	Friendly
2	12 October 1994	Luzhniki Stadium, Moscow, Russia	San Marino	3–0	4–0	UEFA Euro 1996 qualifying
3	26 April 1995	Kaftanzoglio Stadium, Thessaloniki, Greece	Greece	1–0	3–0	UEFA Euro 1996 qualifying
4	28 August 1996	Dynamo Stadium, Moscow, Russia	Brazil	1–0	2–2	Friendly
5	1 September 1996	Dynamo Stadium, Moscow, Russia	Cyprus	1–0	4–0	1998 FIFA World Cup qualification
6	1 September 1996	Dynamo Stadium, Moscow, Russia	Cyprus	3–0	4–0	1998 FIFA World Cup qualification

== Honours ==
Chornomorets Odesa

- Ukrainian Cup: 1992

Spartak Moscow

- Russian Football Premier League: 1993, 1994, 1996
- Russian Cup: 1994

PSV Eindhoven

- Eredivisie: 1999–2000, 2000–01
- Johan Cruyff Shield: 1998, 2000, 2001

Soviet Union U-18

- FIFA U-17 World Cup: 1987
- UEFA U-18 Championship: 1988

Russia

- Legends Cup: 2009, 2010
