= Russia national football team results (2020–present) =

This article provides details of international football games played by the Russia national football team from 2020 to present.

On 28 February 2022, FIFA and UEFA suspended the participation of Russia. The Russian Football Union unsuccessfully appealed the FIFA and UEFA bans to the Court of Arbitration for Sport, which upheld the bans. Since then, they have played several friendlies against non-Western countries.

== Results ==
Key
Win
Draw
Defeat

=== 2020 ===
28 March Friendly	Sweden	Cancelled	Russia

31 March Friendly	Moldova	Cancelled	Russia

3 September 2020–21 UEFA Nations League	Russia	3–1	Serbia	Moscow, Russia
21:45 UTC+3	Dzyuba 48' (pen.), 81'; Karavayev 69'	Report	Mitrović 78'	Stadium: VTB Arena; Attendance: 0 (Note: Due to the COVID-19 pandemic in Europe, all matches scheduled for September 2020 were played behind closed doors.); Referee: William Collum (Scotland)

6 September 2020–21 UEFA Nations League	Hungary	2–3	Russia	Budapest, Hungary
18:00 UTC+2	Sallai 62'; Nikolić 70'	Report	Miranchuk 15'; Ozdoyev 34'; Fernandes 46'	Stadium: Puskás Aréna; Attendance: 0 Referee: Maurizio Mariani (Italy)

8 October Friendly	Russia	1–2	Sweden	Moscow, Russia
19:15 UTC+3	Sobolev 90+1'	Report	Isak 21'; Johansson 72'	Stadium: VEB Arena; Referee: Halis Özkahya (Turkey)
Note: The match was originally scheduled for 28 March 2020 at the Friends Arena, Solna, but postponed due to the COVID-19 pandemic in Sweden.

11 October 2020–21 UEFA Nations League	Russia	1–1	Turkey	Moscow, Russia
21:45 UTC+3	Miranchuk 28'	Report	Karaman 62'	Stadium: VTB Arena; Attendance: 5,019; Referee: Matej Jug (Slovenia)

14 October 2020–21 UEFA Nations League	Russia	0–0	Hungary	Moscow, Russia
21:45 UTC+3		Report		Stadium: VTB Arena; Referee: Michael Oliver (England)

12 November Friendly	Moldova	0–0	Russia	Chișinău, Moldova
19:00 UTC+2		Report		Stadium: Zimbru Stadium; Referee: Radu Petrescu (Romania)
Note: The match was originally scheduled for 31 March 2020, but postponed due to the COVID-19 pandemic in Moldova.

15 November 2020–21 UEFA Nations League	Turkey	3–2	Russia	Istanbul, Turkey
20:00 UTC+3	Karaman 26'; Ünder 32'; Tosun 52' (pen.)	Report	Cheryshev 11'; Kuzyayev 57'	Stadium: Şükrü Saracoğlu Stadium; Attendance: 0 Referee: Szymon Marciniak (Poland)

18 November 2020–21 UEFA Nations League	Serbia	5–0	Russia	Belgrade, Serbia
20:45 UTC+1	Radonjić 10'; Jović 25', 45+1'; Vlahović 41'; Mladenović 64'	Report		Stadium: Red Star Stadium; Attendance: 0 Referee: Anthony Taylor (England)

=== 2021 ===
24 March 2022 FIFA World Cup qualification	Malta	1–3	Russia	Ta' Qali, Malta
20:45 UTC+1	Mbong 56'	Report	Dzyuba 23'; Fernandes 35'; Sobolev 90'	Stadium: National Stadium; Referee: Peter Kjaesgaard (Denmark)

27 March 2022 FIFA World Cup qualification	Russia	2–1	Slovenia	Sochi, Russia
17:00 UTC+3	Dzyuba 26', 35'	Report	Iličić 36'	Stadium: Fisht Stadium; Attendance: 13,008; Referee: Marco Di Bello (Italy)

30 March 2022 FIFA World Cup qualification	Slovakia	2–1	Russia	Trnava, Slovakia
20:45 UTC+2	Škriniar 38'; Mak 74'	Report	Fernandes 71'	Stadium: Anton Malatinský Stadium; Attendance: 0 Referee: Carlos del Cerro Grande (Spain)

1 June Friendly	Poland	1–1	Russia	Wrocław, Poland
20:45 UTC+2	Świerczok 4'	Report	Karavayev 21'	Stadium: Stadion Miejski; Referee: Marco Guida (Italy)
Note: The match was originally scheduled for 2 June 2020, but was postponed due to the COVID-19 pandemic in Poland.

5 June Friendly	Russia	1–0	Bulgaria	Moscow, Russia
18:00 UTC+2	Sobolev 84' (pen.)	Report		Stadium: VTB Arena; Referee: Aleksei Kulbakov (Belarus)

12 June UEFA Euro 2020 Group B	Belgium	3–0	Russia	Saint Petersburg, Russia
22:00 UTC+3	Lukaku 10', 88'; Meunier 34'	Report		Stadium: Krestovsky Stadium; Attendance: 26,264; Referee: Antonio Mateu Lahoz (Spain)

16 June UEFA Euro 2020 Group B	Finland	0–1	Russia	Saint Petersburg, Russia
16:00 UTC+3		Report	Miranchuk 45+2'	Stadium: Krestovsky Stadium; Attendance: 24,540; Referee: Danny Makkelie (Netherlands)

21 June UEFA Euro 2020 Group B	Russia	1–4	Denmark	Copenhagen, Denmark
21:00 UTC+2	Dzyuba 70' (pen.)	Report	Damsgaard 38'; Poulsen 59'; Christensen 79'; Mæhle 82'	Stadium: Parken Stadium; Attendance: 23,644; Referee: Clément Turpin (France)

1 September 2022 FIFA World Cup qualification	Russia	0–0	Croatia	Moscow, Russia
21:45 UTC+3		Report		Stadium: Luzhniki Stadium; Attendance: 18,708; Referee: Orel Grinfeld (Israel)

4 September 2022 FIFA World Cup qualification	Cyprus	0–2	Russia	Nicosia, Cyprus
16:00 UTC+3		Report	Yerokhin 6'; Zhemaletdinov 55'	Stadium: GSP Stadium; Attendance: 1,645; Referee: Alejandro Hernández (Spain)

7 September 2022 FIFA World Cup qualification	Russia	2–0	Malta	Moscow, Russia
21:45 UTC+3	Smolov 10'; Bakayev 84' (pen.)	Report		Stadium: Otkritie Arena; Attendance: 10,508; Referee: Ali Palabıyık (Turkey)

8 October 2022 FIFA World Cup qualification	Russia	1–0	Slovakia	Kazan, Russia
21:45 UTC+3	Škriniar 24' (o.g.)	Report		Stadium: Ak Bars Arena; Attendance: 9,588; Referee: Antonio Mateu Lahoz (Spain)

11 October 2022 FIFA World Cup qualification	Slovenia	1–2	Russia	Maribor, Slovenia
20:45 UTC+2	Iličić 40'	Report	Diveyev 28'; Dzhikiya 32'	Stadium: Ljudski vrt Attendance: 6,524; Referee: Artur Soares Dias (Portugal)

11 November 2022 FIFA World Cup qualification	Russia	6–0	Cyprus	Saint Petersburg, Russia
20:00 UTC+3	Yerokhin 4', 87'; Smolov 55'; Mostovoy 56'; Sutormin 62'; Zabolotny 82'	Report		Stadium: Krestovsky Stadium; Attendance: 10,108; Referee: Daniel Stefanski (Poland)

14 November 2022 FIFA World Cup qualification	Croatia	1–0	Russia	Split, Croatia
15:00 UTC+1	Kudryashov 81' (o.g.)	Report		Stadium: Stadion Poljud; Referee: Danny Makkelie (Netherlands)

=== 2022 ===
On 2 May 2022, UEFA announced that Russia were suspended and automatically relegated to League C of the following UEFA Nations League.

24 March 2022 FIFA World Cup qualification	Russia	Cancelled (Note: Due to the Russian invasion of Ukraine, Russia were suspended, and Poland advanced to the following qualification round on a walkover.)	Poland	Moscow, Russia
18:00 UTC+3		Report (FIFA); Report (UEFA)		Stadium: VTB Arena (Note: The Russia v Poland match, originally scheduled to be played at Luzhniki Stadium, Moscow, was later moved on 2 February 2022 to VTB Arena, Moscow, due to the epidemiological situation in Moscow and the possible limitations associated with it.)

2 June 2022–23 UEFA Nations League	Albania	Cancelled	Russia	Tirana, Albania
20:00 UTC+2		Report		Stadium: Arena Kombëtare

6 June 2022–23 UEFA Nations League	Israel	Cancelled	Russia	Haifa, Israel
21:45 UTC+3		Report		Stadium: Sammy Ofer Stadium

10 June 2022–23 UEFA Nations League	Russia	Cancelled	Iceland	Moscow, Russia
21:45 UTC+3		Report		Stadium: VTB Arena

13 June 2022–23 UEFA Nations League	Russia	Cancelled	Albania	Moscow, Russia
21:45 UTC+3		Report		Stadium: VTB Arena

24 September Friendly	Kyrgyzstan	1–2	Russia	Bishkek, Kyrgyzstan
20:00 UTC+6	Shukurov 24'	Report	Sobolev 30' (pen.); Utkin 89'	Stadium: Dolen Omurzakov Stadium; Referee: Daniyar Sakhi (Kazakhstan)

24 September 2022–23 UEFA Nations League	Iceland	Cancelled	Russia	Reykjavík, Iceland
13:00 UTC+0		Report		Stadium: Laugardalsvöllur

27 September 2022–23 UEFA Nations League	Russia	Cancelled	Israel	Moscow, Russia
21:45 UTC+3		Report		Stadium: VTB Arena

17 November Friendly	Tajikistan	0–0	Russia	Dushanbe, Tajikistan
20:00 UTC+5		Report		Stadium: Pamir Stadium; Referee: Ilgiz Tantashev (Uzbekistan)

20 November Friendly	Uzbekistan	0–0	Russia	Tashkent, Uzbekistan
17:00 UTC+5		Report		Stadium: Pakhtakor Stadium; Referee: Daniyar Sakhi (Kazakhstan)

=== 2023 ===
23 March Friendly	Iran	1–1	Russia	Tehran, Iran
20:30 UTC+3:30	Taremi 49' (pen.)	Report	An. Miranchuk 28' (pen.)	Stadium: Azadi Stadium; Referee: Ilgiz Tantashev (Uzbekistan)

26 March Friendly	Russia	2–0	Iraq	Saint Petersburg, Russia
18:00 UTC+3	An. Miranchuk 50'; Pinyayev 58'	Report		Stadium: Krestovsky Stadium; Attendance: 23,818; Referee: Akhrol Riskullaev (Uzbekistan)

12 September Friendly	Qatar	1–1	Russia	Al Wakrah, Qatar
18:15 UTC+3	Alaaeldin 70'	Report	Soldatenkov 90'	Stadium: Al Janoub Stadium; Referee: Ahmed Al-Kaf (Oman)

12 October Friendly	Russia	1–0	Cameroon	Moscow, Russia
19:00 UTC+3	Chalov 40'	Report		Stadium: VTB Arena; Attendance: 20,152; Referee: Khaled Saleh Al Turais (Saudi Arabia)

16 October Friendly	Russia	2–2	Kenya	Aksu, Turkey
19:00 UTC+3	Sobolev 8'; Oblyakov 89'	Report	Akumu 16'; Juma 36'	Stadium: Mardan Sports Complex; Referee: Atilla Karaoğlan (Turkey)

20 November Friendly	Russia	8–0	Cuba	Volgograd, Russia
19:30 UTC+3	Oblyakov 22'; Golovin 30'; An. Miranchuk 34'; Silyanov 55'; Sobolev 66'; Prutsev 68'; Krivtsov 74'; Mostovoy 78'	Report		Stadium: Volgograd Arena; Attendance: 40,706; Referee: Aleksei Kulbakov (Belarus)

=== 2024 ===
21 March Friendly	Russia	4–0	Serbia	Moscow, Russia
20:00 UTC+3	An. Miranchuk 21' (pen.); Osipenko 32'; Al. Miranchuk 55'; Sergeev 90+1'	Report		Stadium: VTB Arena; Attendance: 23,679; Referee: Arda Kardeşler (Turkey)

25 March Friendly	Russia	Cancelled	Paraguay	Moscow, Russia
20:00 UTC+3		Report		Stadium: VTB Arena
Note: The match originally scheduled for 25 March was cancelled due to the Crocus City Hall attack.

7 June Friendly	Belarus	0–4	Russia	Minsk, Belarus
20:00 UTC+3		Report	Oblyakov 8'; Tyukavin 20'; Chalov 63', 69'	Stadium: Dinamo Stadium; Attendance: 21,483; Referee: Rustam Omarov (Kazakhstan)

5 September 2024 LPBank Cup	Vietnam	0–3	Russia	Hanoi, Vietnam
20:00 UTC+7		Report	Kuzyayev 24'; Vũ Văn Thanh 62' (o.g.); Musayev 77'	Stadium: Mỹ Đình National Stadium; Attendance: 5,315; Referee: Suhaizi Shukri (Malaysia)

7 September 2024 LPBank Cup	Thailand	Cancelled	Russia	Hanoi, Vietnam
20:00 UTC+7		Report		Stadium: Mỹ Đình National Stadium
Note: The match was cancelled for safety reasons due to Typhoon Yagi.

15 November Friendly	Russia	11–0	Brunei	Krasnodar, Russia
19:00 UTC+3	Oblyakov 1', 28'; Othman 7' (o.g.); Morozov 9'; Sadulayev 48'; Krivtsov 57'; Musayev 62'; Mostovoy 67'; Chernikov 73'; Batrakov 79'; Adamov 87'	Report		Stadium: Krasnodar Stadium; Attendance: 26,865; Referee: Rustam Lutfullin (Uzbekistan)

19 November Friendly	Russia	4–0	Syria	Volgograd, Russia
19:30 UTC+3	Osipenko 33', 81' (pen.); Samoshnikov 52'; Al. Miranchuk 66'	Report		Stadium: Volgograd Arena; Attendance: 35,620; Referee: Majed Al-Shamrani (Saudi Arabia)

=== 2025 ===
19 March Friendly	Russia	5–0	Grenada	Moscow, Russia
20:00 UTC+3	Prutsev 16'; Adamov 42'; Dzyuba 43'; Fomin 53'; Bakayev 59'	Report		Stadium: VTB Arena; Attendance: 15,823; Referee: Ilgiz Tantashev (Uzbekistan)

25 March Friendly	Russia	5–0	Zambia	Moscow, Russia
20:00 UTC+3	Glushenkov 8', 53', 58'; Vakhaniya 44'; Batrakov 73'	Report		Stadium: VTB Arena; Attendance: 20,864; Referee: Adel Al-Naqbi (United Arab Emirates)

6 June Friendly	Russia	1–1	Nigeria	Moscow, Russia
20:00 UTC+3	Ajayi 27' (o.g.)	Report	Arokodare 71'	Stadium: Luzhniki Stadium; Attendance: 45,638; Referee: Aliyar Aghayev (Azerbaijan)

10 June Friendly	Belarus	1–4	Russia	Minsk, Belarus
20:00 UTC+3	Pigas 54'	Report	Gladyshev 21', 24', 33', 52'	Stadium: National Football Stadium; Attendance: 27,314; Referee: Sayat Karabaev (Kazakhstan)

4 September Friendly	Russia	0–0	Jordan	Moscow, Russia
20:00 UTC+3		Report		Stadium: Lukoil Arena; Attendance: 24,915; Referee: Ilgiz Tantashev (Uzbekistan)

7 September Friendly	Qatar	1–4	Russia	Al Rayyan, Qatar
18:15 UTC+3	Afif 62'	Report	Golovin 33'; Kislyak 35'; Sergeyev 45'; Al. Miranchuk 69'	Stadium: Jassim bin Hamad Stadium; Attendance: 8,953; Referee: Yousif Saeed Hasan (Iraq)

10 October Friendly	Russia	2–1	Iran	Volgograd, Russia
20:00 UTC+3	Vorobyov 22'; Batrakov 70'	Report	Hosseinzadeh 48'	Stadium: Volgograd Arena; Attendance: 42,387; Referee: Nikola Dabanović (Montenegro)

14 October Friendly	Russia	3–0	Bolivia	Moscow, Russia
20:00 UTC+3	Sadulayev 18'; Al. Miranchuk 43'; Sergeyev 57'	Report		Stadium: VTB Arena; Attendance: 20,533; Referee: Nikola Dabanović (Montenegro)

12 November Friendly	Russia	1–1	Peru	Saint Petersburg, Russia
20:00 UTC+3	Golovin 18'	Report	Valera 82'	Stadium: Krestovsky Stadium; Attendance: 45,536; Referee: Kamal Umudlu (Azerbaijan)

15 November Friendly	Russia	0–2	Chile	Sochi, Russia
18:00 UTC+3		Report	Tapia 37'; Brereton Díaz 76'	Stadium: Fisht Olympic Stadium; Attendance: 32,779; Referee: Firdavs Norsafarov (Uzbekistan)

=== 2026 ===
27 March Friendly	Russia	3–1	Nicaragua	Krasnodar, Russia
19:30 UTC+3	Sadulayev 3'; Tyukavin 45+3' (pen.); Golovin 83'	Report	Acevedo 16'	Stadium: Krasnodar Stadium; Attendance: 31,625; Referee: Abdurashid Khudoyberganov (Uzbekistan)

31 March Friendly	Russia	0–0	Mali	Saint Petersburg, Russia
20:00 UTC+3		Report		Stadium: Krestovsky Stadium; Attendance: 34,837; Referee: Rustam Lutfullin (Uzbekistan)

28 May Friendly	Egypt	1–0	Russia	Cairo, Egypt
20:00 UTC+3	Ziko 65'	Report		Stadium: Misr Stadium; Attendance: 35,000; Referee: Lahlou Benbraham (Algeria)

5 June Friendly	Russia	3–0	Burkina Faso	Volgograd, Russia
20:00 UTC+3	Sadulayev 15'; Al. Miranchuk 20'; Vakhaniya 73'	Report		Stadium: Volgograd Arena; Attendance: 41,035; Referee: Nenad Minaković (Serbia)

9 June Friendly	Russia	3–0	Trinidad and Tobago	Kaliningrad, Russia
20:00 UTC+3	Beveyev 7'; Silyanov 15'; Batrakov 60'	Report		Stadium: Kaliningrad Stadium; Attendance: 27,618; Referee: Nenad Minaković (Serbia)

29 September Friendly	Russia	2–0	Iran	Kazan, Russia
19:00 UTC+3	Golovin 21', 36'	Report		Stadium: Kazan Arena; Attendance: 34,362; Referee: Ilgiz Tantashev (Uzbekistan)

3 October Friendly	Russia	6–0	Namibia	Yekaterinburg, Russia
18:00 UTC+3	Sadulayev 37'; Prutsev 54'; Tyukavin 65'; Glushenkov 85'; Petrov 87' (pen.); Ndisiro 90+3' (o.g.)	Report		Stadium: Yekaterinburg Arena; Attendance: 27,156; Referee: Abdurashid Khudoyberganov (Uzbekistan)

6 October Friendly	Russia	3–3	Nigeria	Nizhny Novgorod, Russia
19:00 UTC+3	Sadulayev 30'; Kislyak 45+2'; Al. Miranchuk 54'	Report	Iheanacho 10'; Edokpolor 78'; Adams 90+4'	Stadium: Nizhny Novgorod Stadium; Attendance: 40,126; Referee: Nikola Dabanović (Montenegro)

12 November Friendly	Uzbekistan	2–3	Russia	Tashkent, Uzbekistan
20:00 UTC+5	Melyokhin 5' (o.g.); Karimov 46'	Report	Komlichenko 70', 75'; Al. Miranchuk 79'	Stadium: Pakhtakor Central Stadium; Attendance: 9,815; Referee: Sadullo Gulmurodi (Tajikistan)

17 November Friendly	Russia	2–0	Venezuela	Krasnodar, Russia
19:00 UTC+3	Al. Miranchuk 59', 75'	Report		Stadium: Krasnodar Stadium; Attendance: 31,701; Referee: Firdavs Norsafarov (Uzbekistan)

== Venues in Russia ==
Included UEFA Euro 2020 Russia matches

	City	Times
1	Moscow	13
2	Saint Petersburg	6
3	(Volgograd Oblast) Volgograd	4
4	(Krasnodar Krai) Krasnodar	3
5	(Tatarstan) Kazan	2
5	(Krasnodar Krai) Sochi	2
6	(Kaliningrad Oblast) Kaliningrad	1
6	(Nizhny Novgorod Oblast) Nizhny Novgorod	1
6	(Sverdlovsk Oblast) Yekaterinburg	1

== Head to head record ==
As of 17 November 2026.

Opponent	games played	games won	games drawn	games lost	goals for	goals against	goal difference	win percentage
Belgium	1	0	0	1	0	3	−3	0.00
Belarus	2	2	0	0	8	1	+7	100.00
Bolivia	1	1	0	0	3	0	+3	100.00
Brunei	1	1	0	0	11	0	+11	100.00
Bulgaria	1	1	0	0	1	0	+1	100.00
Burkina Faso	1	1	0	0	3	0	+3	100.00
Cameroon	1	1	0	0	1	0	+1	100.00
Chile	1	0	0	1	0	2	−2	0.00
Croatia	2	0	1	1	0	1	−1	0.00
Cuba	1	1	0	0	8	0	+8	100.00
Cyprus	2	2	0	0	8	0	+8	100.00
Denmark	1	0	0	1	1	4	−3	0.00
Egypt	1	0	0	1	0	1	−1	0.00
Finland	1	1	0	0	1	0	+1	100.00
Grenada	1	1	0	0	5	0	+5	100.00
Hungary	2	1	1	0	3	2	+1	50.00
Iran	3	2	1	0	5	2	+3	66.67
Iraq	1	1	0	0	2	0	+2	100.00
Jordan	1	0	1	0	0	0	+0	0.00
Kenya	1	0	1	0	2	2	+0	0.00
Kyrgyzstan	1	1	0	0	2	1	+1	100.00
Mali	1	0	1	0	0	0	+0	0.00
Malta	2	2	0	0	5	1	+4	100.00
Moldova	1	0	1	0	0	0	+0	0.00
Namibia	1	1	0	0	6	0	+6	100.00
Nicaragua	1	1	0	0	3	1	+2	100.00
Nigeria	2	0	2	0	4	4	+0	0.00
Peru	1	0	1	0	1	1	+0	0.00
Poland	1	0	1	0	1	1	+0	0.00
Qatar	2	1	1	0	5	2	+3	50.00
Serbia	3	2	0	1	7	6	+1	66.67
Slovakia	2	1	0	1	2	2	+0	50.00
Slovenia	2	2	0	0	4	2	+2	100.00
Sweden	1	0	0	1	1	2	−1	0.00
Syria	1	1	0	0	4	0	+4	100.00
Tajikistan	1	0	1	0	0	0	+0	0.00
Trinidad and Tobago	1	1	0	0	3	0	+3	100.00
Turkey	2	0	1	1	3	4	−1	0.00
Uzbekistan	2	1	1	0	3	2	+1	50.00
Venezuela	1	1	0	0	2	0	+2	100.00
Vietnam	1	1	0	0	3	0	+3	100.00
Zambia	1	1	0	0	5	0	+5	100.00
Total: 42 teams played	57	33	15	9	118	47	+71	57.89

== See also ==
- Russia national football team results (1992–2019)
