= Luzhniki Small Sports Arena =

Indoor arena in Moscow, Russia

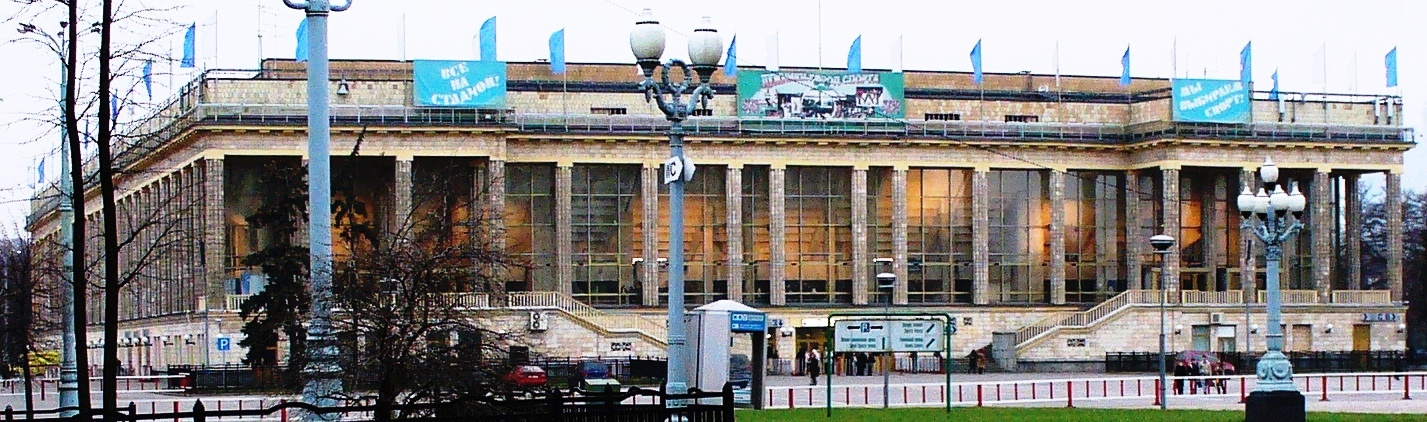
- Interactive map of Luzhniki Small Sports Arena
- Former names: Minor Arena of the Central Lenin Stadium
- Location: Khamovniki District, Moscow, Russia
- Coordinates: 55°43′06″N 37°32′56″E
- Capacity: 8,700

Construction
- Opened: 1956

Tenant
- Dynamo Moscow (2000–2015)

Website
- www.luzhniki.ru

The Luzhniki Small Sports Arena (formerly, the Minor Arena of the Central Lenin Stadium; Russian: Малая спортивная арена Лужники) is an 8,700-seat indoor arena that is part of the Luzhniki Sports Complex in Moscow, Russia. The arena was built in 1956 in the Soviet Union. It hosted volleyball competitions during the 1980 Summer Olympics.

It also hosted events of the 1973 Summer Universiade, 1986 Goodwill Games, Spartakiads of the Peoples of the USSR, Legends Cup 2018 and 2020 and others. The arena was the home arena of the Kontinental Hockey League (Tarasov Division) ice hockey club Dynamo Moscow from 2000–2015.

== See also ==
- Luzhniki Olympic Complex
