= Oleksandr Nikiforov =

Ukrainian footballer

Personal information
- Full name: Oleksandr Valeriyovych Nikiforov
- Date of birth: 18 October 1967 (age 59)
- Place of birth: Odesa, Ukrainian SSR, Soviet Union
- Height: 1.82 m (5 ft 11 1/2 in)
- Position: Midfielder

Senior career*
Years	Team	Apps	(Gls)
1985	FC Chornomorets Odesa	0	(0)
1985	FC Dynamo Stavropol	1	(0)
1986–1987	SKA Odesa	74	(4)
1988–1990	FC Chornomorets Odesa	57	(6)
1990–1992	BVSC Budapest	24	(2)
1992–1993	FC Chornomorets Odesa	17	(1)
1993–1994	BVSC Budapest	2	(0)
1993–1994	FC KAMAZ Naberezhnye Chelny	16	(0)
1995	FC Chornomorets Odesa	9	(0)
1995	SK Mykolaiv	9	(0)
1995	MTK	15	(1)
1996	FC KAMAZ-Chally Naberezhnye Chelny	11	(2)
1997	FC Gazovik-Gazprom Izhevsk	10	(1)
1997–1999	SK Odesa	21	(2)
- * Club domestic league appearances and goals

Oleksandr Valeriyovych Nikiforov (Ukrainian: Олександр Валерійович Нікіфоров; born 18 October 1967) is a former Ukrainian professional footballer.

== Club career ==
He made his professional debut in the Soviet First League in 1985 for FC Dynamo Stavropol. He played 1 game in the UEFA Cup 1990–91 for FC Chornomorets Odesa.

== Personal life ==
He is the older brother of the former CIS/Ukraine/Russia international footballer Yuri Nikiforov.

== Honours ==
- USSR Federation Cup winner: 1990.
- Ukrainian Premier League runner-up: 1995.
- Ukrainian Premier League bronze: 1993, 1994.
