= Diego Bonavina =

Italian retired footballer (born 1965)

Diego Bonavina (born 20 October 1965 in Morciano di Romagna) is an Italian retired footballer. He played as a midfielder. He played for Dolo, Giorgione, Caerano and Mantova before arriving at Treviso where he remained for two seasons playing in Serie B and Serie C1. He then played for Padova in Serie C1 and retired in 2000.

In 1994, he became a lawyer and after retirement, he continued to exert this activity. In 1999, he became a counselor of the Italian Footballers' Association.

== Career ==
1983-1984 Dolo 15 (1)
1984-1992 Giorgione 180 (16)
1992-1993 Caerano 32 (3)
1993-1994 Mantova 13 (0)
1994-1999 Treviso 153 (28)
1999-2000 Padova 33 (3)
