= Russia v Ukraine (UEFA Euro 2000 qualifying) =

Russia v Ukraine (1999)
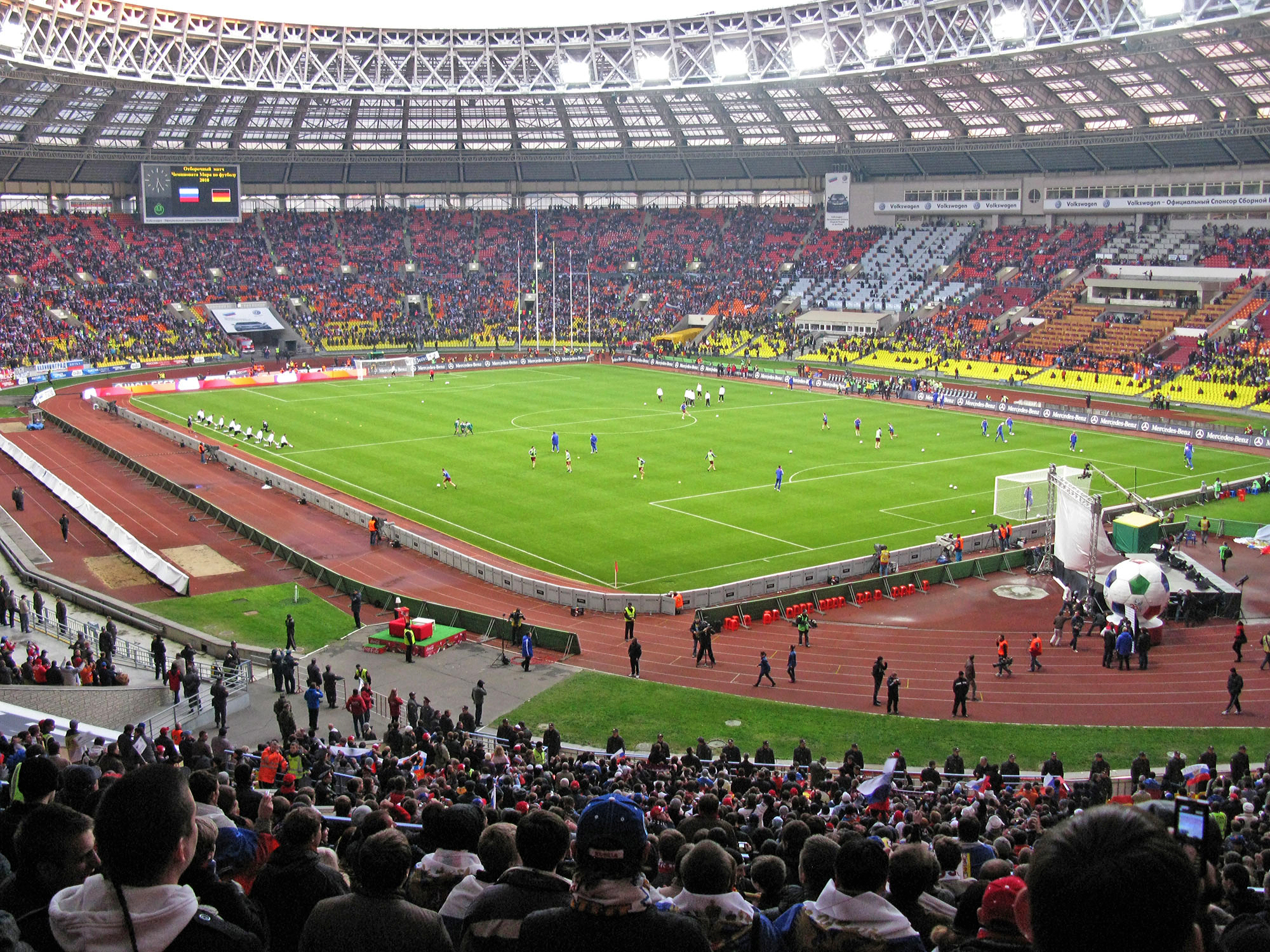
- The Luzhniki Stadium in Moscow hosted the match
- Event: UEFA Euro 2000 qualifying Group 4 Matchday 10
Russia	Ukraine
1	1
- Ukraine advances to qualifying play-offs, Russia eliminated from qualifying
- Date: 9 October 1999
- Venue: Luzhniki Stadium, Moscow
- Referee: David Elleray (England)
- Attendance: 78,600

On 9 October 1999, a football match took place between Russia and Ukraine in Moscow at Luzhniki Stadium. It was the final match for both nations in group 4 in the qualifying tournament for UEFA Euro 2000.

== Overview ==
This match and the earlier between both nations in Euro 2000 qualifying, which Ukraine won 3–2, remain the only times Russia and Ukraine have faced each other in official competition. In addition to the football ramifications, the game had a wider significance as a contest between two neighboring former Soviet countries and was attended by many Russian celebrities as well as Prime Minister Vladimir Putin.

Entering the match, Russia needed a win to guarantee progression to the Euro 2000, while Ukraine only needed a draw to guarantee at least 2nd place and thus a play-off berth. Needing a win, Russia was on the attack much of the game looking for a go-ahead goal.

In the 75th minute Valeri Karpin opened the score with a powerful free kick. This appeared to provide Russia the result they needed, and Ukraine was heading out of qualifying. However, in the 87th minute, Andriy Shevchenko sent a long free kick towards the Russian goal. The shot appeared to be savable, but Russian goalkeeper Aleksandr Filimonov was surprised by the effort and, trying to catch the ball, knocked it into his own net.

The match ended in a 1–1 draw, which combined with other results left Ukraine in second place behind France. Ukraine qualified for a two-match play-off, which they lost to Slovenia, while Russia fell to third place and were eliminated from qualifying.

== Match details ==
9 October 1999
20:00 MDT

Russia	1–1	Ukraine
Karpin 75'	Report	Shevchenko 88'

Luzhniki Stadium, Moscow
Attendance: 78,600
Referee: David Elleray (England)

Russia	Ukraine

GK	1	Aleksandr Filimonov
SW	7	Viktor Onopko (c)
CB	6	Yuri Drozdov
CB	4	Alexey Smertin
RM	8	Valeri Karpin
CM	3	Dmitri Khokhlov
CM	5	Dmitri Alenichev
LM	2	Dmitri Khlestov	(yellow card) 49'
AM	9	Yegor Titov
AM	11	Andrey Tikhonov		(substituted off) 62'
CF	10	Aleksandr Panov		(substituted off) 80'
Substitutions:
FW	17	Vladimir Beschastnykh		(substituted on) 62'
MF	18	Sergei Semak		(substituted on) 80'
Manager:
Oleg Romantsev

GK	1	Oleksandr Shovkovskyi
RB	2	Oleh Luzhnyi (c)
CB	5	Vladyslav Vashchuk
CB	4	Oleksandr Holovko
LB	6	Yuriy Dmytrulin	(substituted off) 76'
CM	8	Andriy Husin
CM	7	Yuriy Maksymov	(substituted off) 77'
RW	11	Serhiy Rebrov
AM	3	Serhiy Mizin
LW	9	Serhiy Skachenko	(substituted off) 41'
CF	10	Andriy Shevchenko
Substitutions:
DF	13	Volodymyr Mykytyn	(substituted on) 41'
MF	16	Serhiy Kovalyov	(substituted on) 76'
MF	18	Hennadiy Moroz	(substituted on) 77'
Manager:
Yozhef Sabo

Assistant referees:
David Bryan (England)
David Babski (England)
Fourth official:
Mike Riley (England)

Match rules

- 90 minutes.
- Maximum of three substitutions.

== Aftermath ==
Afterward, on the orders of the Luzhniki stadium administration, the goal Filimonov had defended during the second half was sawn into small pieces.

The two Euro 2000 qualifiers remain the only time that Russia and Ukraine have played each other in an international "A" match, giving Ukraine the head-to-head advantage of one win and one draw.

Following the start of the Russo-Ukrainian War in 2014, UEFA decreed that representative teams from either nation at club and international level cannot play against each other outside of knockout competitions. After the Russian invasion of Ukraine in 2022, the Russian Football Union has been suspended from FIFA and UEFA.
