= Legends Cup (Russia) =

- Organiser(s): RFS
- Founded: 2009; 16 years ago
- Region: International
- Related competitions: World Cup of Masters
- Current champions: Russia (2025)
- Most championships: Russia (15 titles)
- Website: legends-cup.ru

The Konstantin Eremenko Legends Cup (Russian: Кубок Легенд имени Константина Ерёменко) is an unofficial, international friendly six-a-side football tournament that is not recognized by FIFA, for retired senior (35+) players held in Russia since 2009. A match lasts 40 minutes, 20 minutes a half. Half-time takes 10 minutes. There are 5 field players and a goalkeeper.

Following the untimely death of a Russian futsal star and the Russian team member in the first edition of the tournament, Konstantin Eremenko, the event is named after him starting from 2010.

The tournament is held with the support of the Russian Football Union, the Moscow City Duma and the State Duma. Russia has won the most titles with 15 to date.

== Competitions ==
=== Finals ===
Note: All editions held in Moscow

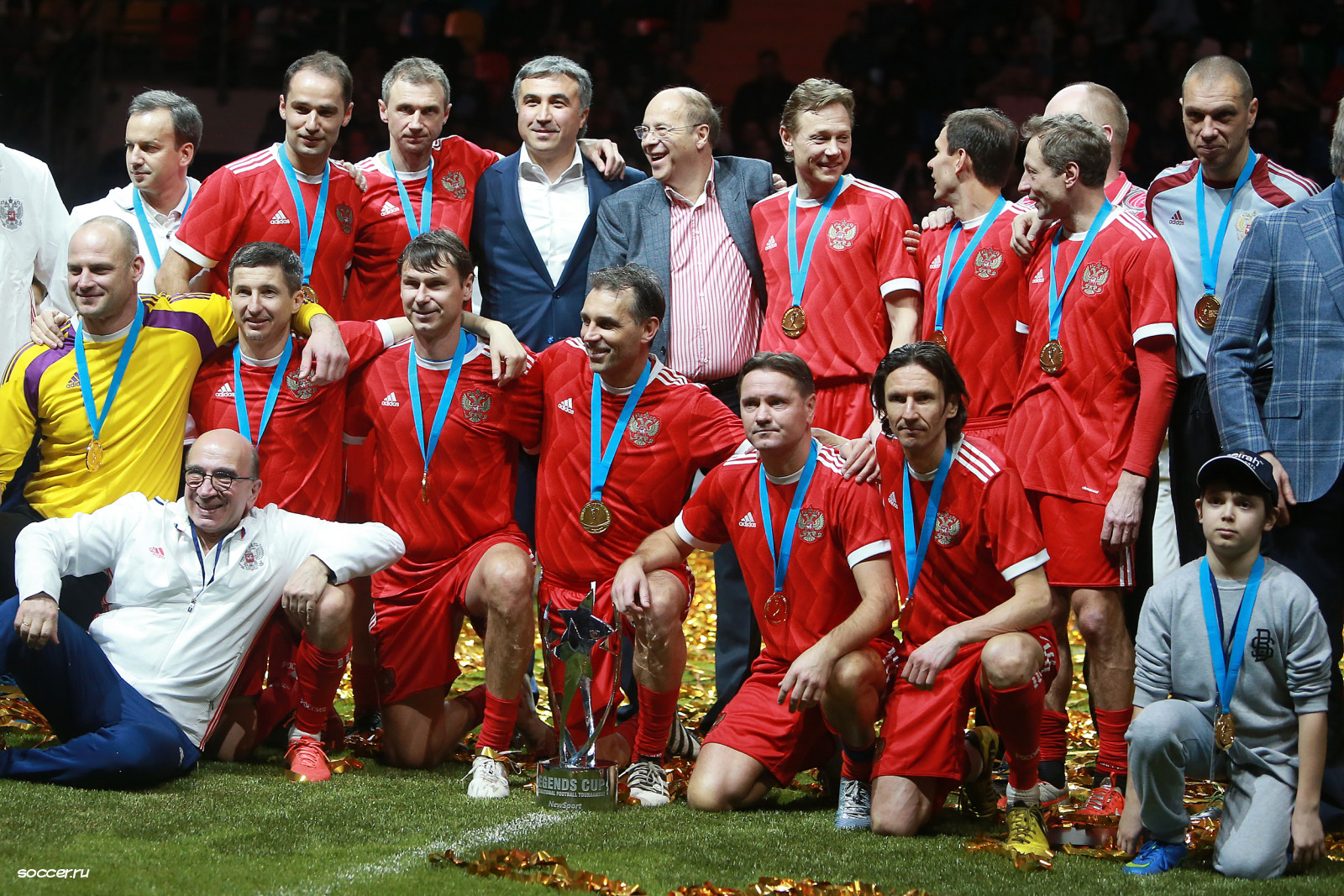
The 2017 Russia team

Ed.	Year	Champions	Score	Runners-up	Venue
1	2009	Russia	8–4	Spain	Megasport Sport Palace
2	2010	Russia	4–2	Spain	Megasport Sport Palace
3	2011	Russia	13–4	Netherlands	Megasport Sport Palace
4	2012	Russia	6–2	Ukraine	Megasport Sport Palace
5	2013	Russia	9–6	Ukraine	Luzhniki Small Sports Arena
6	2014	Russia	9–6	Portugal	Luzhniki Small Sports Arena
7	2015	Russia	8–7	Portugal	Luzhniki Small Sports Arena
8	2016	Russia	15–9	France	Luzhniki Small Sports Arena
9	2017	Russia	8–2	Germany	Megasport Sport Palace
10	2018	Russia	7–6	Italy	Megasport Sport Palace
11	2019	Russia	13–4	Germany	Luzhniki Small Sports Arena
12	2020	(United Nations) World All Star	6–5	Russia	Luzhniki Small Sports Arena
13	2021	Russia	13–8	(United Nations) World All Star	Megasport Sport Palace
14	2022	Russia	9−4	Turkey	Megasport Sport Palace
15	2023	Russia	6–4	(Commonwealth of Independent States) CIS All Star	Megasport Sport Palace
16	2024	(Russia) FC Spartak Moscow All Star	7–5	(United Nations) World All Star	Megasport Sport Palace
17	2025	Russia	8–4	(European Union) Europe All Star	Megasport Sport Palace

== Wins by team ==
Team	Winners	Runners-up
Russia	15 (2009, 2010, 2011, 2012, 2013, 2014, 2015, 2016, 2017, 2018, 2019, 2021, 2022, 2023, 2025)	1 (2020)
(United Nations) World All Star	1 (2020)	2 (2021, 2024)
(Russia) FC Spartak Moscow All Star	1 (2024)	–
Portugal	–	2 (2014, 2015)
Ukraine	–	2 (2012, 2013)
Spain	–	2 (2009, 2010)
Germany	–	2 (2017, 2019)
(European Union) Europe All Star	–	1 (2025)
(Commonwealth of Independent States) CIS All Star	–	1 (2023)
France	–	1 (2016)
Netherlands	–	1 (2011)
Italy	–	1 (2018)
Turkey	–	1 (2022)
