= List of Russia international footballers born outside Russia =

This is a list of foreign-born international football players for Russia, which includes players born outside Russia or, for players born before Russian independence, outside the Russian SFSR.

== List of players ==
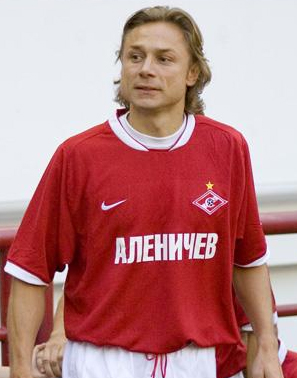
Valery Karpin

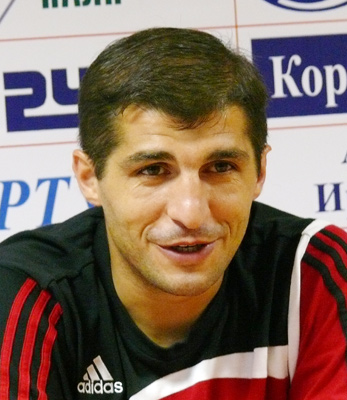
Omari Tetradze

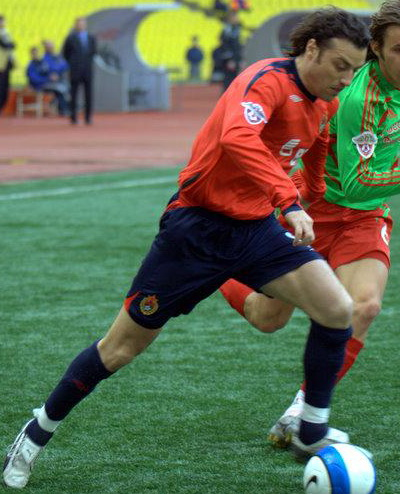
Rolan Gusev

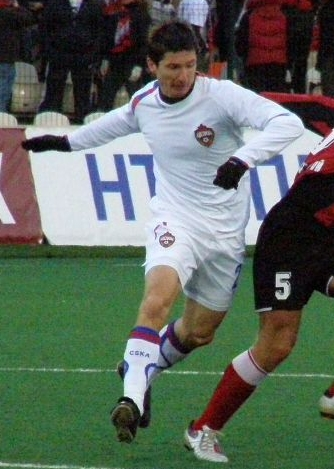
Evgeni Aldonin

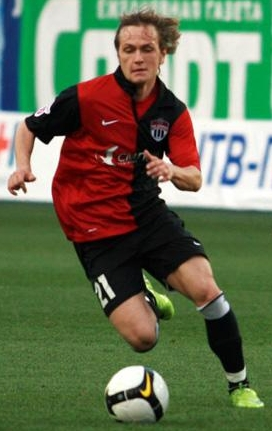
Viktor Budyansky

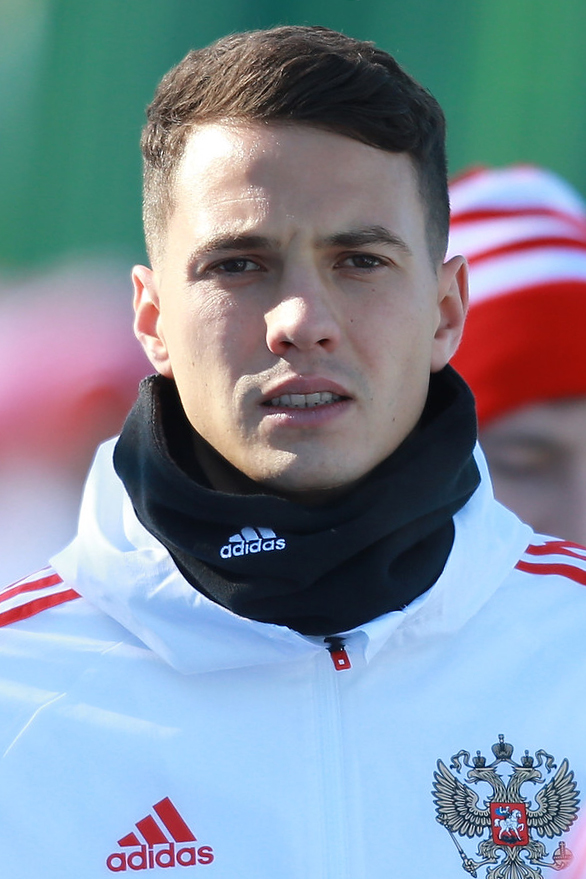
Anton Shvets

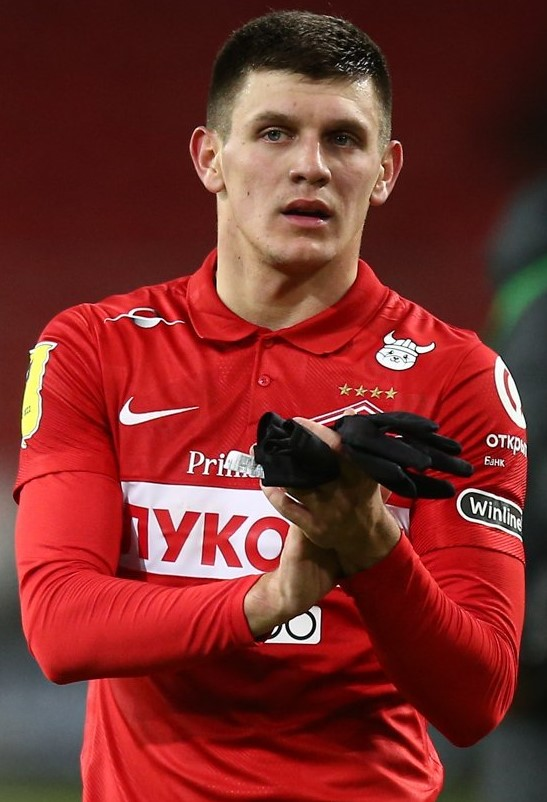
Daniil Khlusevich

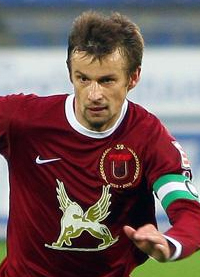
Sergei Semak

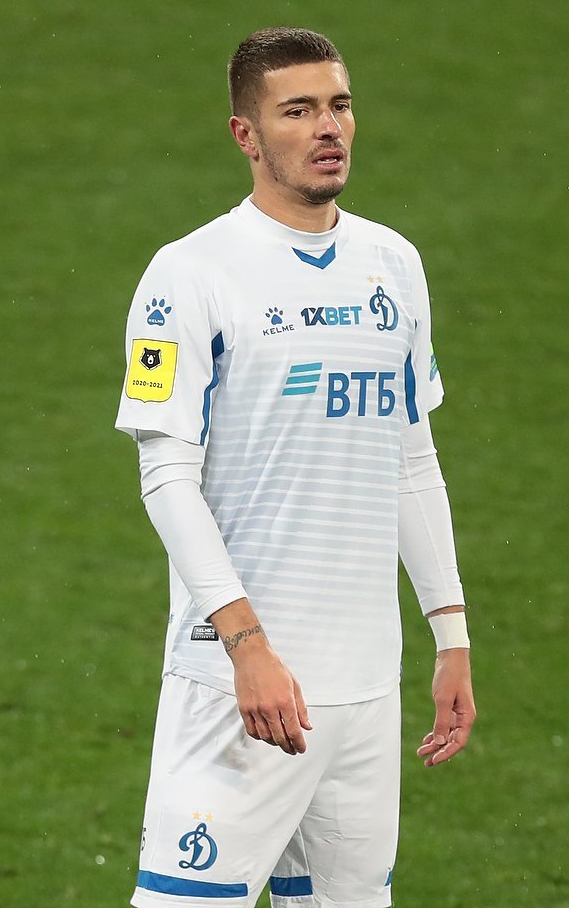
Roman Neustädter

Players in bold have been called up for Russia within the last 12 months, as of 1 October 2026

Name	Born	Place of birth	Country of birth	National career	Caps	Goals
Vladislav Lemish (Note: Previously represented USSR at youth level) (Note: Subsequently represented Azerbaijan)	1970	Baku	Azerbaijan (then USSR)	1992	1	0
Sergei Podpaly	1963	Kiev	Ukraine (then USSR)	1992–1994	2	0
Igor Dobrovolski (Note: Previously represented USSR and CIS)	1967	Markivka	Ukraine (then USSR)	1992–1998	18	2
Andrei Kanchelskis	1969	Kirovohrad	Ukraine (then USSR)	1992–1998	36	4
Sergei Yuran	1969	Lugansk	Ukraine (then USSR)	1992–1999	25	5
Vladimir Niederhaus (Note: Also represented Kazakhstan)	1967	Kokchetav	Kazakhstan (then USSR)	1992–2000	4	1
Omari Tetradze	1969	Velispiri	Georgia (then USSR)	1992–2002	40	1
Valery Karpin (Note: Previously represented CIS)	1969	Narva	Estonia (then USSR)	1992–2003	72	1
Viktor Onopko	1969	Lugansk	Ukraine (then USSR)	1992–2004	109	7
Bakhva Tedeyev	1969	Tskhinvali	Georgia (then USSR)	1993–1994	6	1
Andrey Pyatnitsky (Note: Previously represented Uzbekistan)	1967	Tashkent	Uzbekistan (then USSR)	1993–1995	10	3
Sergei Gorlukovich (Note: Previously represented USSR)	1961	Boruny	Belarus (then USSR)	1993–1996	17	0
Yuriy Nikiforov (Note: Previously represented Ukraine)	1970	Odesa	Ukraine (then USSR)	1993–2002	55	6
Sergei Mandreko (Note: Previously represented Tajikistan)	1971	Kurgan-Tyube	Tajikistan (then USSR)	1994	1	0
Rashid Rakhimov (Note: Also represented Tajikistan)	1965	Dushanbe	Tajikistan (then USSR)	1994–1995	2	0
Vladislav Ternavsky	1969	Kiev	Ukraine (then USSR)	1994–1996	9	0
Valery Kechinov (Note: Previously represented USSR and CIS at youth level)	1974	Tashkent	Uzbekistan (then USSR)	1994–1998	6	2
Ilya Tsymbalar	1969	Odesa	Ukraine (then USSR)	1994–1999	28	4
Mukhsin Mukhamadiev	1966	Dushanbe	Tajikistan (then USSR)	1995	1	1
Vladimir Lebed (Note: Previously represented Ukraine at youth level)	1973	Kherson	Ukraine (then USSR)	1995	1	0
Akhrik Tsveiba	1966	Gudauta	Georgia (then USSR)	1997	8	0
Sergei Semak	1976	Sychanske	Ukraine (then USSR)	1997–2010	65	4
Oleksandr Horshkov (Note: Subsequently represented Ukraine)	1970	Kirovsk	Ukraine (then USSR)	1998	2	0
Artyom Bezrodny	1979	Sumy	Ukraine (then USSR)	1999	1	0
Gennadiy Nizhegorodov	1977	Odesa	Ukraine (then USSR)	2000–2003	9	0
Rolan Gusev	1977	Ashgabat	Turkmenistan (then USSR)	2000–2005	31	1
Andrei Karyaka (Note: Previously represented Ukraine at youth level)	1978	Dnipropetrovsk	Ukraine (then USSR)	2001–2005	27	6
Evgeni Aldonin	1980	Alupka	Ukraine (then USSR)	2002–2007	29	0
Viktor Budyanskiy	1984	Vovchansk	Ukraine (then USSR)	2007	2	0
Roman Neustädter (Note: Previously represented Germany)	1988	Dnipropetrovsk	Ukraine (then USSR)	2016–2020	13	1
Guilherme	1985	Cataguases	Brazil	2016–2021	19	0
Mário Fernandes (Note: Previously represented Brazil)	1990	São Caetano do Sul	Brazil	2017–2021	33	5
Anton Zabolotny	1991	Aizpute	Latvia (then USSR)	2017–2021	19	2
Ari (Note: Previously represented Brazil at youth level)	1985	Fortaleza	Brazil	2018	2	0
Anton Shvets	1993	Henichesk	Ukraine	2018	1	0
Ilzat Akhmetov	1997	Bishkek	Kyrgyzstan	2019–2023	9	0
Vladimir Pisarsky	1996	Krasnoperekopsk	Ukraine	2022	1	0
Daniil Khlusevich	2001	Simferopol	Ukraine	2022–2024	5	0
Yevgeni Kharin	1995	Maardu	Estonia	2023	1	0
**Kirill Glebov**	2005	Rudny	Kazakhstan	2025–	4	0

=== Stats by country of birth ===
Country	Players
Ukraine	20
Brazil	3
Georgia	3
Tajikistan	3
Estonia	2
Kazakhstan	2
Uzbekistan	2
Azerbaijan	1
Belarus	1
Kyrgyzstan	1
Latvia	1
Turkmenistan	1
