= Amir Ibragimov =

Russian footballer (born 2008)

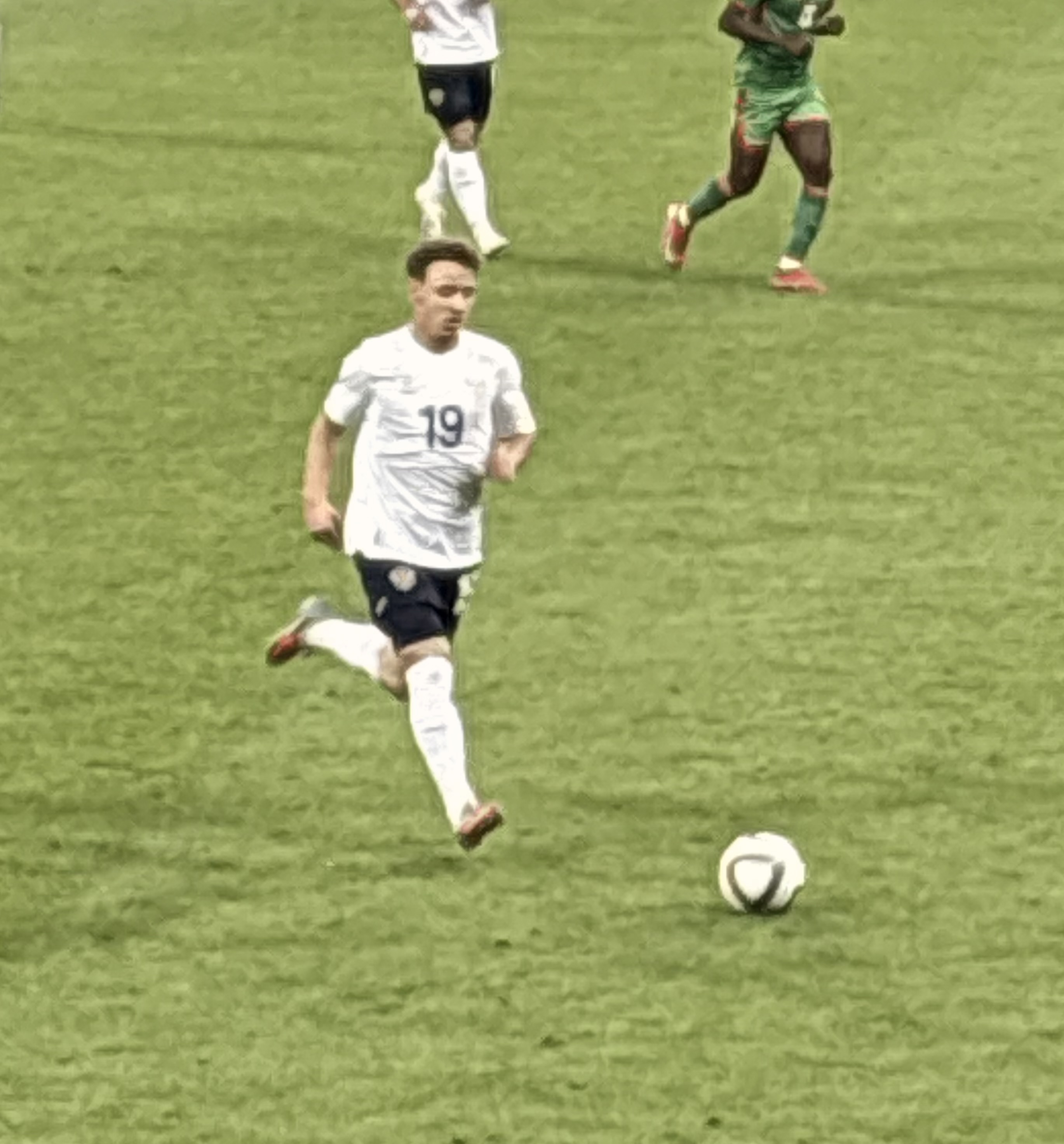
- Ibragimov in action with Russia against Burkina Faso in a 2026 friendly

Personal information
- Full name: Amir Cherimovich Ibragimov
- Date of birth: 2 April 2008 (age 18)
- Place of birth: Makhachkala, Dagestan, Russia
- Height: 1.73 m (5 ft 8 in)
- Position: Forward

Team information
- Current team: Manchester United
- Number: 73

Youth career
- 2019–2021: Sheffield United
- 2021–: Manchester United

Senior career*
Years	Team	Apps	(Gls)
2024–	Manchester United	0	(0)

International career^{‡}
2023	England U15	1	(0)
2024	England U16	2	(1)
2026–	Russia	2	(0)
- * Club domestic league appearances and goals as of 16 March 2023 ‡ National team caps and goals as of 9 June 2026

Amir Cherimovich Ibragimov (Russian: Амир Черимович Ибрагимов; born 2 April 2008) is a Russian footballer who plays as a forward for Premier League club Manchester United and the Russia national team.

Born in Russia, he represented England at youth level since 2023. He moved to England at an early age and holds dual-citizenship.

== Club career ==
Born in a Muslim Avar family in Dagestan, Russia, Ibragimov's family moved to England when he was eleven years old, and he started his career in the academy of Sheffield United.

He later moved to Manchester United, captaining both the under-14 and under-15 sides during his progression through the academy. While playing for the Manchester United under-15 side against Tottenham in March 2022, Ibragimov won a penalty after dribbling into the Tottenham penalty area. However, as he did not believe he was fouled, he passed the resulting penalty into the Tottenham goalkeeper's hands, a gesture which garnered national attention. He signed his first contract, a pre-scholarship deal, with the club in August 2022.

On 15 January 2023, having scored for Manchester United's under-16 team in their 1–0 win against Liverpool's under-16s, he appeared for Manchester United's under-18 team in the same day, featuring in a 3–2 win, with Liverpool being the opponents again. In April 2023, he trained with the Manchester United first team squad for the first time.

He started for the first team in a behind-closed doors 3-1 friendly loss against Burnley in January 2024, playing as a right winger.

== International career ==
Ibragimov is eligible to represent Russia through birth, and England, having lived in the country from the age of eleven. He made his first appearance for the England under-15s in a 3–2 win over Belgium in February 2023.

On 12 May 2026, he was included in the expanded list of the senior Russia national team candidates for upcoming series of friendlies. He was confirmed for the final list on 18 May 2026. On 6 June 2026, he made his debut in a 3–0 win over Burkina Faso. He became the third-youngest Russia national team player ever at the age of 18 years, two months and three days, behind Sergei Pinyayev and Igor Akinfeev.

== Personal life ==
Ibragimov is a Muslim, and footage of him reciting the Quran at the Trafford Centre in Manchester went viral in March 2023.

His older brother, Ibrahim, is a professional MMA fighter, while his youngest brother, Mo, who joined from Manchester City in Summer 2023 and younger brother Gazik play football for Manchester United's youth teams.

== Career statistics ==
=== International ===
As of match played 9 June 2026

Appearances and goals by national team and year
National team	Year	Apps	Goals
Russia	2026	2	0
Total		2	0

== Honours ==
Manchester United U18

- Professional Development League: 2023–24

== See also ==
- List of Russia international footballers born outside Russia
