= Andrei Semak =

Russian-Ukrainian footballer

Personal information
- Full name: Andrei Bogdanovich Semak
- Date of birth: 9 December 1974 (age 51)
- Height: 1.83 m (6 ft 0 in)
- Positions: Defender; midfielder

Senior career*
Years	Team	Apps	(Gls)
1993–1994	FC Khimik Severodonetsk	3	(0)
1995–1996	FC Avanhard-Industriya Rovenky	17	(0)
1996–1997	FC Shakhtar Krasny Luch		
1997	FC Fagot-Vugleremont Krasny Luch		
1998	FC Kuban Krasnodar	2	(0)
1999–2001	FC Vityaz Krymsk	94	(7)
2002–2003	FC Slavyansk Slavyansk-na-Kubani	56	(3)
2003–2004	FC Vityaz Krymsk	44	(12)
2007	FC Aleks Vityazevo		
2008	FC Abinsk (amateur)	1	(0)
2009	FC Abinsk		
2011–2012	FC Zarya Krymsk (amateur)		
- * Club domestic league appearances and goals

Andrei Bogdanovich Semak (Russian: Андрей Богданович Семак; Ukrainian: Андрій Богданович Семак; born 9 December 1974) is a former Russian-Ukrainian professional football player.

== Club career ==
He played in the Russian Football National League for FC Kuban Krasnodar in 1998.

== Personal life ==
His younger brothers Sergei Semak and Nikolai Semak also were footballers.
