= Luhansk =

Russian-occupied city in Ukraine

Luhansk Луганськ (Ukrainian) Lugansk
- City
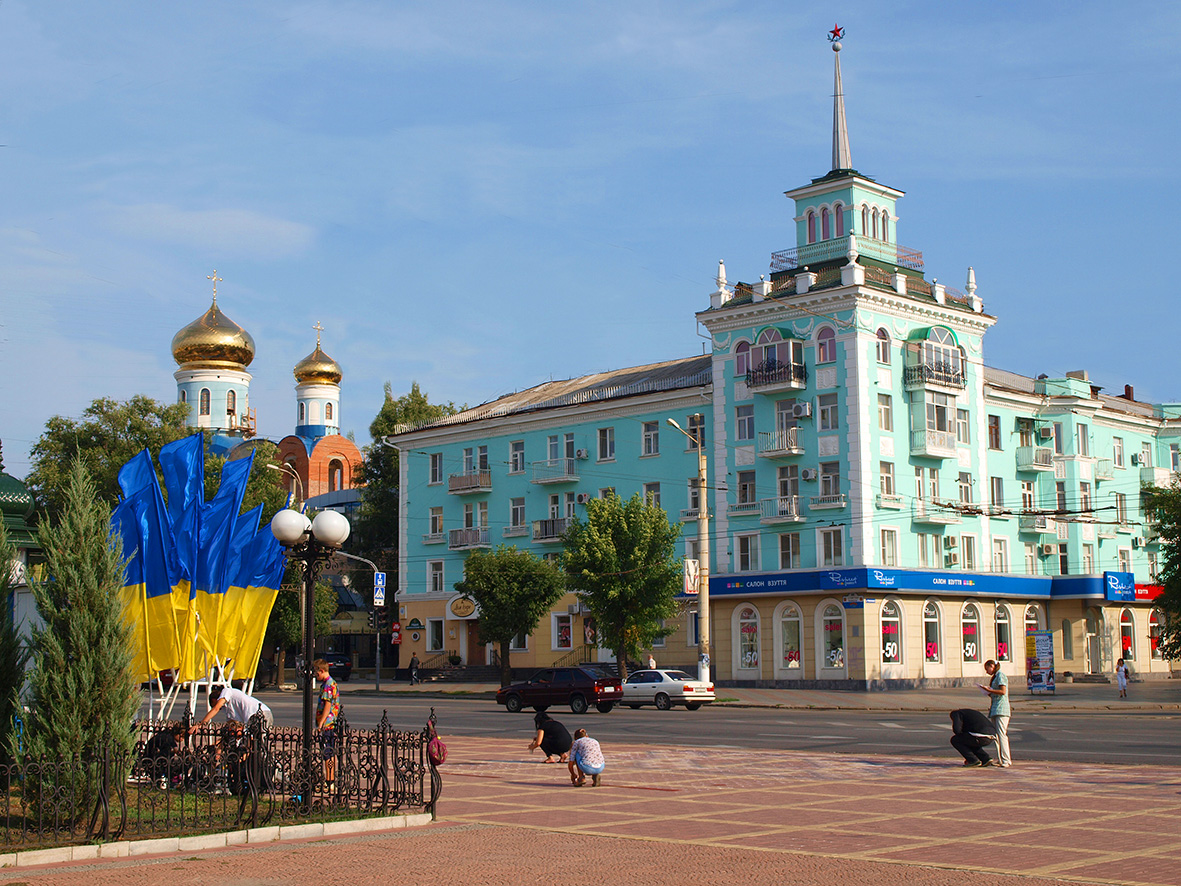
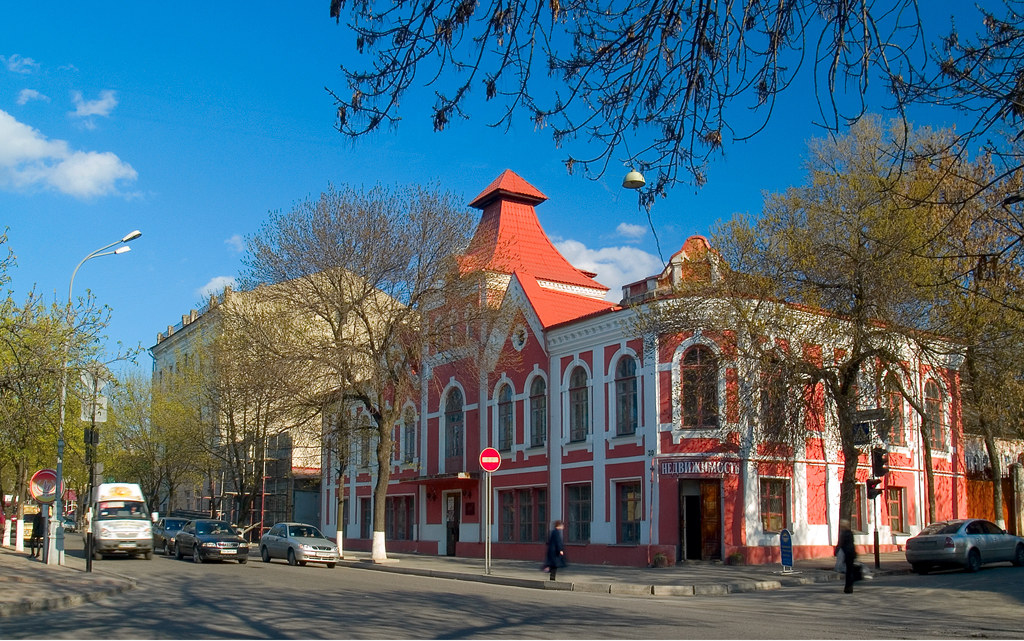
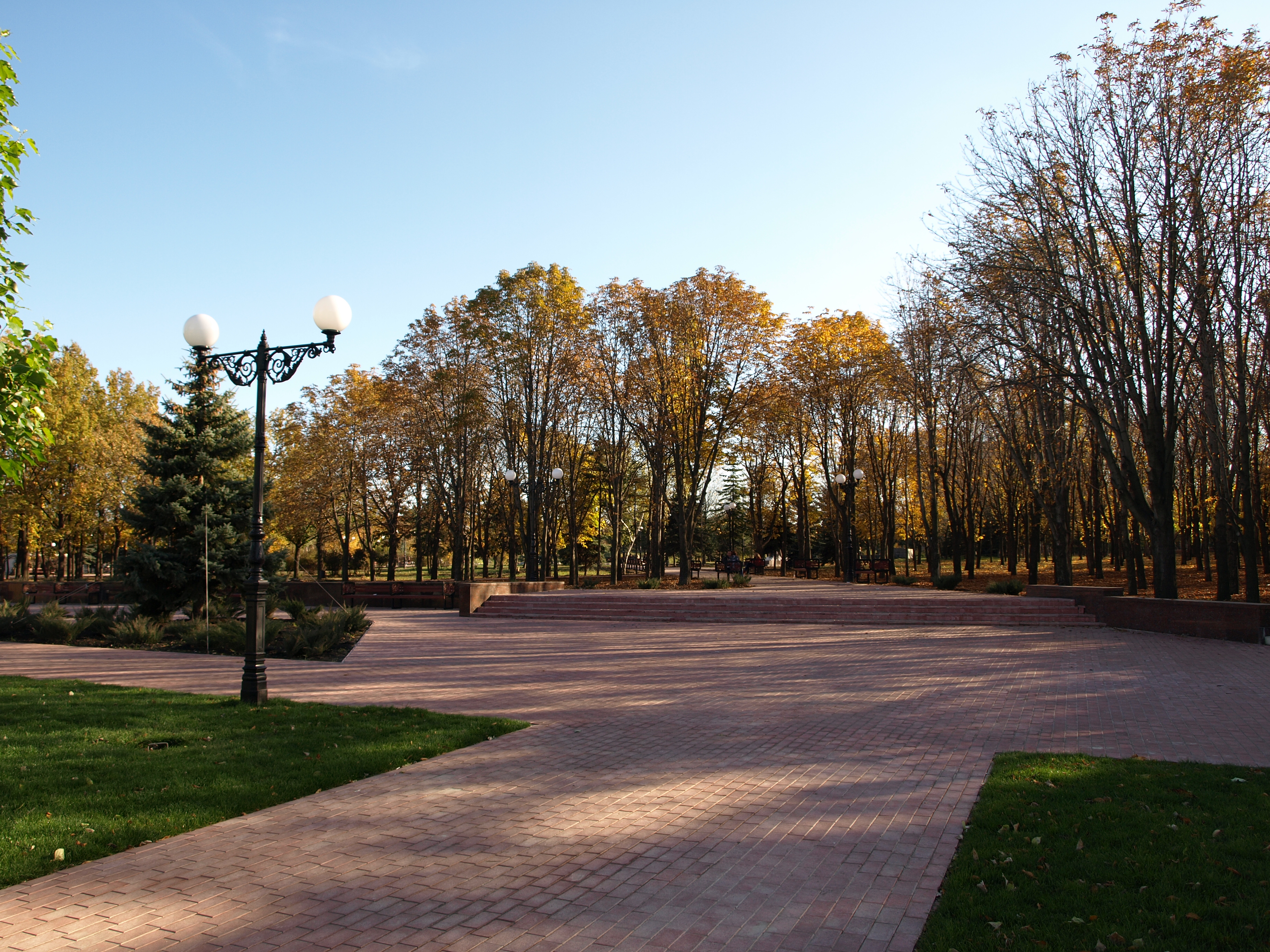
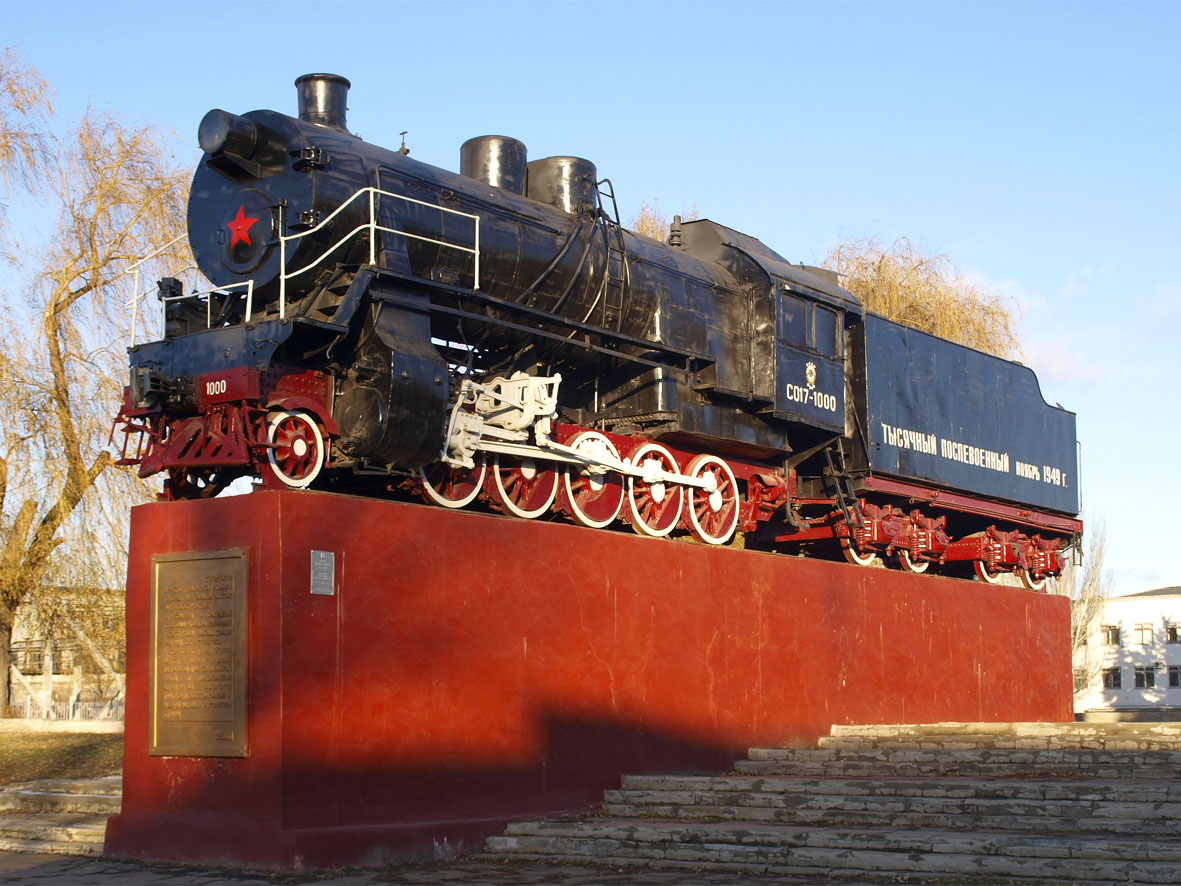
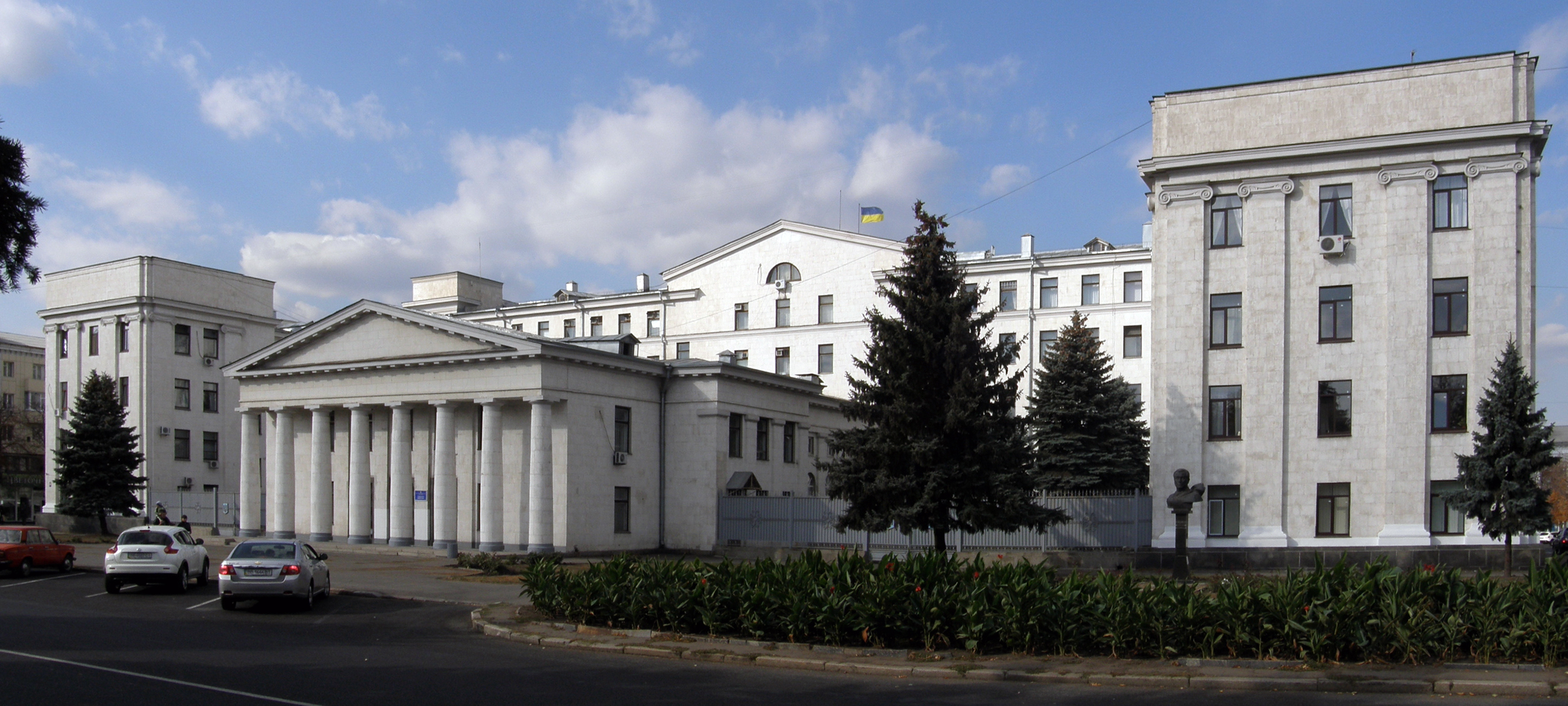
- Radianska Street Museum of local history Memory Park Luhanskteplovoz steam locomotive Luhansk Oblast Council

- Flag Coat of arms
- Interactive map of Luhansk
- Location of Luhansk Luhansk (Ukraine) Luhansk (Europe)
- Coordinates: 48°34′04″N 39°18′11″E
- Country: Ukraine
- Oblast: Luhansk Oblast
- Raion: Luhansk Raion
- Hromada: Luhansk urban hromada
- Founded: 1795

Government
  - Mayor (russian-installed): Yana Pashchenko

Area
  - City: 269.61 km^{2} (104.10 sq mi)
  - Metro: 2,147 km^{2} (829 sq mi)
- Elevation: 117 m (384 ft)

Population (2022)
  - City: 397,677
  - Density: 1,475.0/km^{2} (3,820.3/sq mi)
  - Metro: 527,367
- Postal code: 291000-291060
- Area codes: +7 (857) +7 (959)
- Climate: Dfa

Luhansk (Note: UK: /luːˈhænsk/, US: /-ˈhɑːn-/) (Ukrainian: Луганськ (Note: IPA: [lʊˈɦɑnʲsʲk])), also known as Lugansk (Note: UK: /-ˈɡæn-/, US: /-ˈɡɑːn-/) (Russian: Луганск (Note: IPA: [lʊˈɡansk])), is a city in the Donbas in eastern Ukraine. As of 2022, the population was estimated to be 397,677 (2022 estimate), making Luhansk the 12th-largest city in Ukraine.

Luhansk served as the administrative center of Luhansk Oblast, before pro-Russian separatists seized control of the city in 2014 and made it the capital of the self-proclaimed Luhansk People's Republic. The Ukrainian administration was located in Sievierodonetsk from 2014 to 2022 during the war in Donbas, due to Ukraine not being in control of Luhansk. Sievierodonetsk was captured by Russia in 2022 and Luhansk Oblast was later annexed by Russia in late 2022.

== Etymology ==
The city was founded as a foundry in 1795–1796, following the decree of Empress Catherine II titled On the establishment of a foundry in the Donetsk uyezd by the Lugan River. The settlement that developed around the plant was named Lugansk, deriving its name from the hydronym Lugan, which itself originates from the Russian word lug (meadow). The settlement was granted city status in 1882.

In 1935, the city was renamed Voroshilovgrad in honor of the Soviet political and military figure Kliment Voroshilov. Following the adoption of a 1957 decree by the Presidium of the Supreme Soviet of the USSR, which prohibited naming populated places after living political figures, the city's original name, Lugansk, was restored in 1958. However, in 1970, after Voroshilov's death, the city was once again renamed Voroshilovgrad. In 1990, the name Luhansk was reinstated.

== History ==
=== Founding and early history ===
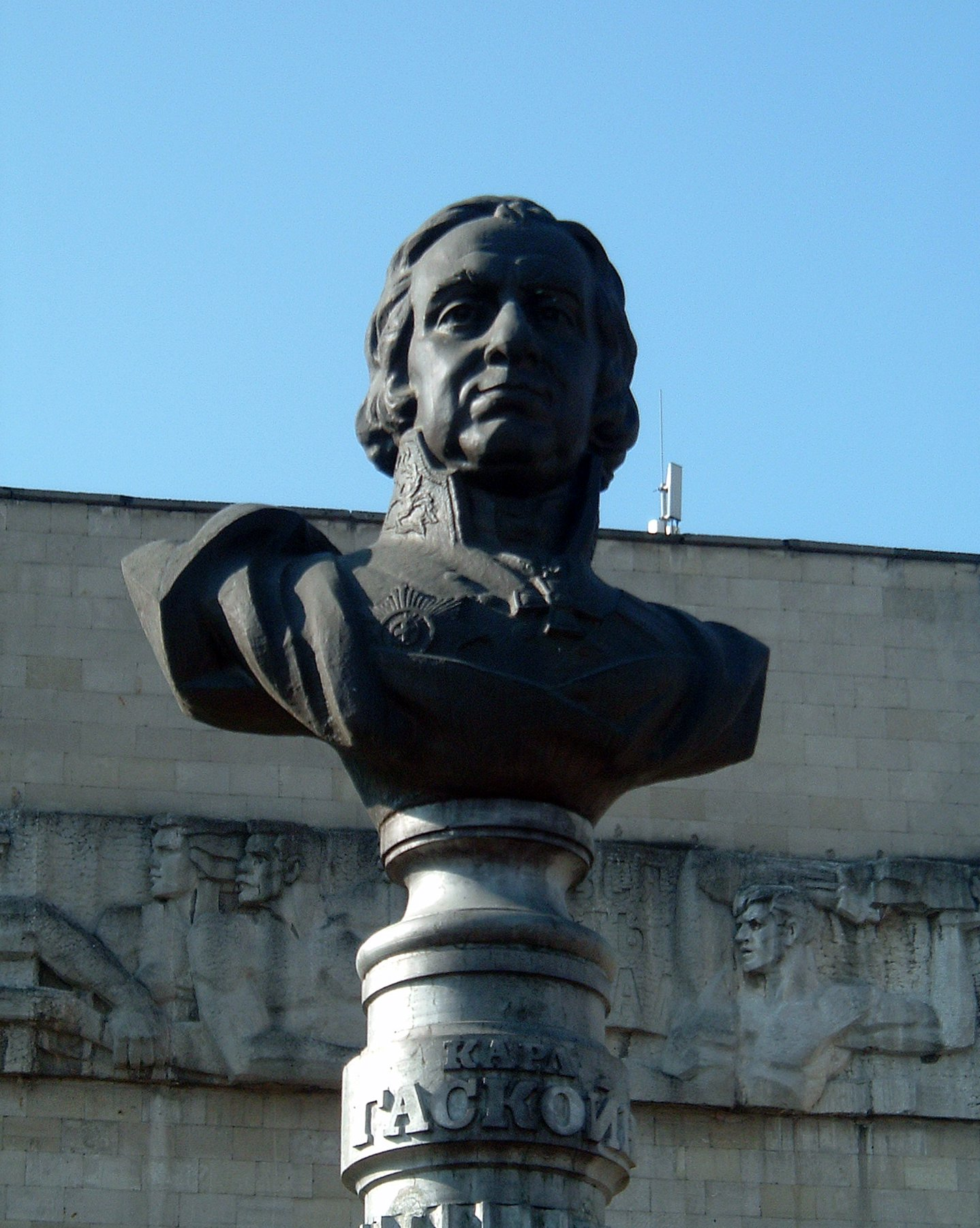
Bust of Charles Gascoigne

The city traces its history to 1797 when the British industrialist Charles Gascoigne, commissioned by the Imperial Russian government in 1795, founded an ammunition and cannon factory for the Black Sea Fleet. Gascoigne had emigrated to Saint Petersburg years earlier, and founded factories and mines across the Russian Empire during his time there. There is a prominent bust of him in Luhansk commemorating his role in the city's founding.

The factory was built in the Donets Basin (or Donbas) at the confluence of the Luhan and Vilkhivka rivers. The Russian craftsmen settled upstream, at the settlement of Kamianyi Brid. The name "Luhansk" comes from the Luhan River, which flows through the city. According to folk etymology, the name is also derived to the word "Luh" (Ukrainian: Луг), which means "meadow", referring to the floodplains around the river.

The factory was greatly expanded during the Napoleonic Wars, and again during the Crimean War. By 1880, the factory was a large industrial node, linked by rail to other major cities and to the Azov Sea. In 1882, the Luhansk Factory was merged with Kamianyi Brid into a new settlement named Luhansk, which received city status. In 1897, Luhansk had a population of 20,400, 68.2% of whom were Russians.

In summer 1896, German industrialist Gustav Hartmann founded a locomotive-building company in Luhansk, which is now Luhanskteplovoz. It became operational in 1900, and soon produced a large proportion of all locomotives in the Russian Empire.

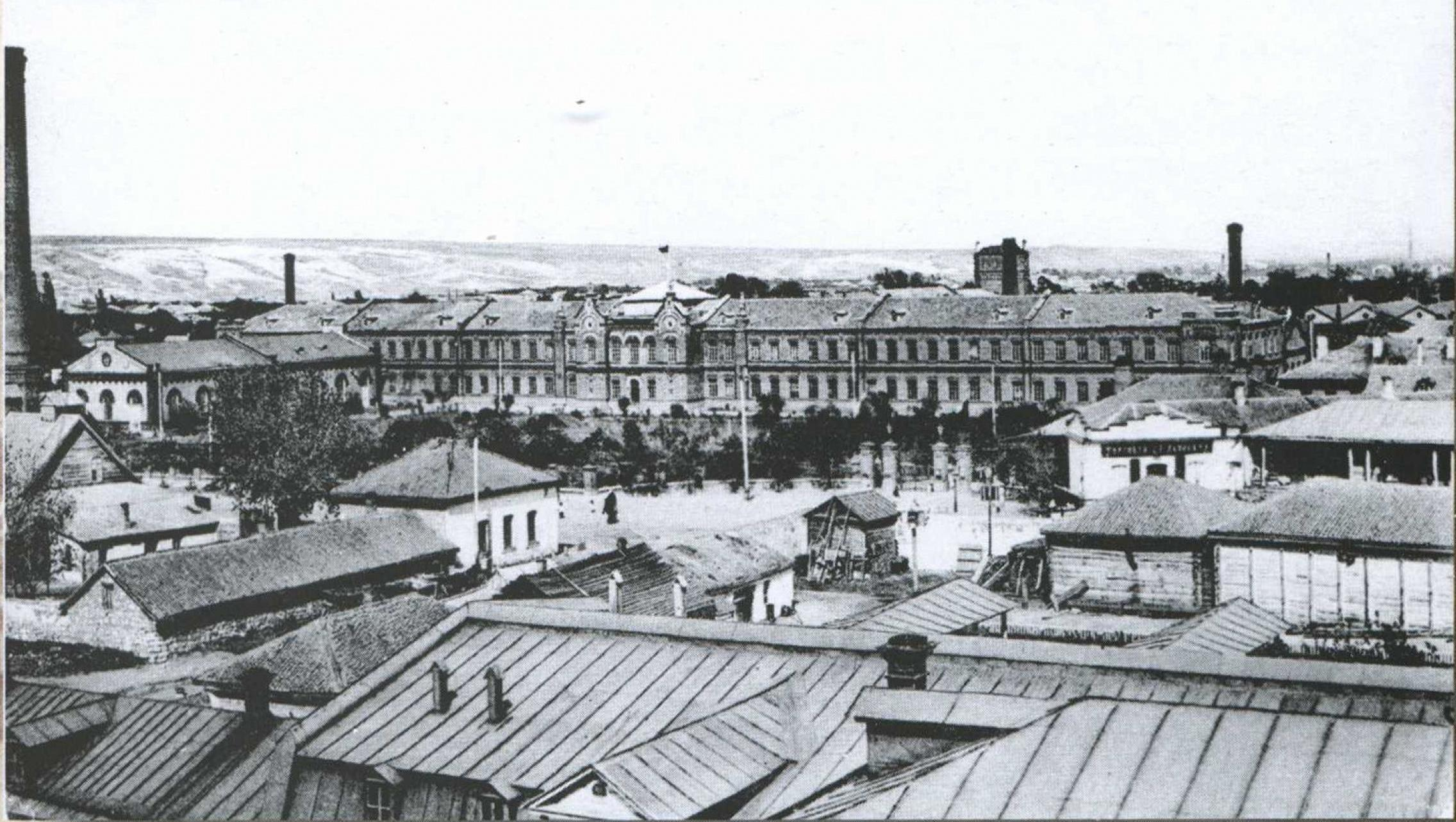
Luhansk before 1917

Luhansk was economically devastated by the Ukrainian War of Independence. In April 1918, Luhansk was occupied by the Central Powers during their invasion of Ukraine, and passed to the Ukrainian State. Then, it was taken by Anton Denikin's anti-communist Volunteer Army in May 1919, before changing hands several times. It was finally taken by the Red Army in January 1920. Afterwards, it was administratively part of the Donets Governorate of Ukraine.

=== In the Soviet Union ===
The city's economy was rebuilt, and Luhansk grew rapidly during the interwar period. On 5 November 1935, the city was renamed Voroshilovgrad (Russian: Ворошиловград, romanized: Voroshilovgrad; Ukrainian: Ворошиловград, romanized: Voroshylovhrad) in honour of Soviet military commander and politician Kliment Voroshilov. In 1938, Voroshilovgrad Oblast was established, with the city as its center.

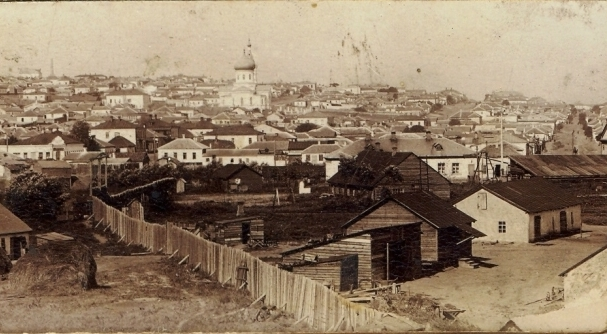
Luhansk in the 1920s

The economic recovery and development of the city was also accompanied by significant demographic change. The population grew from 72,000 to 212,000 between 1926 and 1939, and there was an influx of Ukrainians from the countryside into the city. The proportion of Ukrainians grew from 19.1% to 58.7% between 1897 and 1939, many of whom were refugees fleeing the Holodomor, a manmade famine across Soviet Ukraine. The Russian proportion of the population shrank to 34.5%.

Voroshilovgrad became a frontline city in World War II after the failure of Nazi Germany's Operation Barbarossa to capture major Soviet cities. In March 1942, a grand concert featuring the work of Taras Shevchenko was held in the city to inspire Ukrainians to fight off the invading Nazis. In July 1942, Germany concentrated its forces in the area and forced the Soviets to retreat to the Volga and the North Caucasus. On 14 July 1942, German troops captured Voroshilovgrad. Locals waged partisan warfare against the occupation. The city was eventually liberated by the Red Army on 14 February 1943.

In the postwar period, the city was rebuilt. The population recovered and grew, again alongside demographic change. More Russians were brought in to rebuild and help with industrialization, again reducing the share of Ukrainians to a minority of 48.3% by 1959 and raising the share of Russians to 47.1%. On 5 March 1958, after Khrushchev's call to not name cities after living people, the old name of Luhansk was reinstated. Kliment Voroshilov himself opposed the restoration of the old name in 1958. In January 1970, after the death of Kliment Voroshilov on 2 December 1969, the city's name was changed again to Voroshilovgrad.

Demographic shifts continued during the late Soviet period; by 1989, Ukrainians made up 41.8% of the population and Russians had a majority of 52.4%. On 4 May 1990, a decree of the Supreme Soviet of the Ukrainian SSR gave the city back its original name.

=== Ukrainian independence ===
Ukraine gained its independence from the Soviet Union in 1991. In 1994, a consultative referendum took place in Donetsk Oblast and Luhansk Oblast, with around 90% supporting the Russian language gaining status of an official language alongside Ukrainian, and for the Russian language to be an official language on a regional level.

The previous demographic trends reversed in independent Ukraine; by 2001, Ukrainians—who increasingly spoke Russian—were 50% of the population and Russians made up 47%. The population as a whole began to decline as the economy stagnated, dropping from 505,000 in 1992 to 424,000 in 2014.

==== Russo–Ukrainian war ====
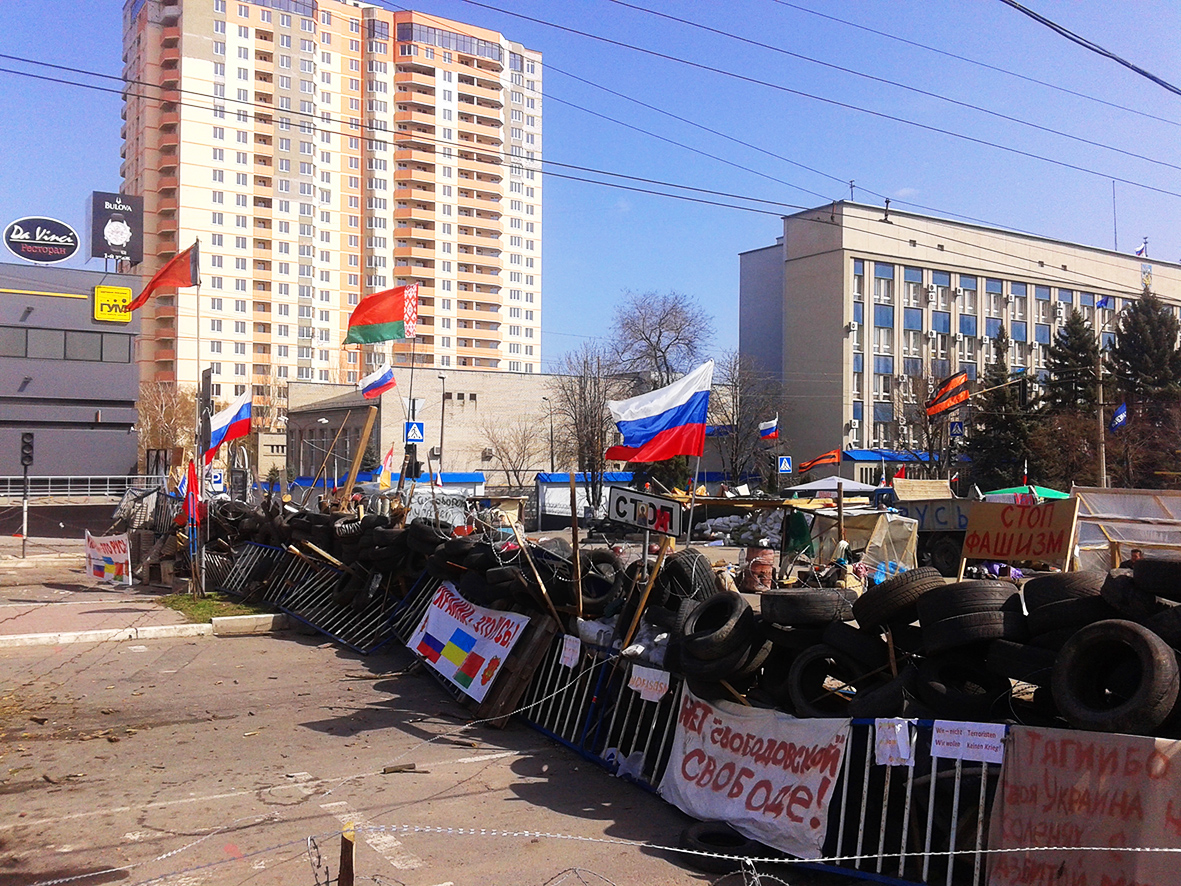
Pro-Russian unrest in Luhansk, April 2014

In April 2014, Russia-backed separatists seized governmental buildings in the region, proclaiming the Luhansk People's Republic (LPR), with its capital in Luhansk. An independence referendum, unconstitutional under Ukrainian law, was held on 11 May 2014. This referendum was not recognized as legitimate by any government. These events escalated into the war in Donbas.

In August 2014, Ukrainian government forces completely surrounded rebel-held Luhansk. Heavy shelling caused civilian casualties in the city. On 17 August, Ukrainian soldiers entered the rebel-controlled Luhansk and for a time had control over a police station. A statement released on 22 August by Lithuanian foreign minister Linas Antanas Linkevičius said that the Lithuanian honorary consul in Luhansk, Mykola Zelenec, was abducted by the pro-Russian separatists and murdered. Linkevičius defined the abductors as 'terrorists'.

After the Ilovaisk counteroffensive, LPR forces regained Lutuhyne and other Luhansk suburbs. Ukrainian forces withdrew from the Luhansk International Airport on 1 September 2014, after heavy fighting. Human Rights Watch reported high civilian casualties in and around the city, recording over 300 civilian deaths caused by explosive weapons between May and September 2014. The temporary administration of Luhansk Oblast was moved to Sievierodonetsk by the government of Ukraine.

On 21 November 2017, armed men in unmarked uniforms took up positions in the center of Luhansk in what appeared to be a power struggle between the head of the republic Igor Plotnitsky and the (sacked by Plotnitsky) LPR appointed interior minister Igor Kornet. Media reports stated that the Donetsk People's Republic, a parallel Russian-backed entity in neighboring Donetsk Oblast, had sent armed troops to Luhansk the following night. Three days later the website of the separatists stated that Plotnitsky had resigned "for health reasons. Multiple war wounds, the effects of blast injuries, took their toll." The website stated that security minister Leonid Pasechnik had been named acting leader "until the next elections."

== Geography ==
Luhansk is located at the confluence of the Luhan (also known as Luhanka) and Olkhova rivers. The total area of land within the city's boundaries is 28.6 thousand hectares.

The city's main street is Sovetskaya Street, and the central venue for major public events is Theatre Square.

=== Climate ===
Luhansk has a hot summer humid continental climate (Köppen Dfa). Luhansk has both the highest and lowest temperature recorded in Ukraine. A record high of 42.0 °C (107.6 °F) was recorded on 12 August 2010, which is the highest temperature to have ever been recorded in Ukraine. A record low of −41.9 °C (−43.4 °F) was recorded on 8 January 1935.

Climate data for Luhansk (1991-2020, extremes 1882–present)
Month	Jan	Feb	Mar	Apr	May	Jun	Jul	Aug	Sep	Oct	Nov	Dec	Year
Record high °C (°F)	13.4 (56.1)	17.3 (63.1)	24.1 (75.4)	31.4 (88.5)	36.6 (97.9)	39.3 (102.7)	40.5 (104.9)	42.0 (107.6)	36.8 (98.2)	31.2 (88.2)	24.0 (75.2)	15.5 (59.9)	42.0 (107.6)
Mean daily maximum °C (°F)	−0.6 (30.9)	0.8 (33.4)	7.0 (44.6)	16.4 (61.5)	23.3 (73.9)	27.5 (81.5)	29.9 (85.8)	29.4 (84.9)	22.6 (72.7)	14.5 (58.1)	5.9 (42.6)	0.7 (33.3)	14.8 (58.6)
Daily mean °C (°F)	−3.6 (25.5)	−3.0 (26.6)	2.5 (36.5)	10.4 (50.7)	16.5 (61.7)	21.0 (69.8)	23.2 (73.8)	22.1 (71.8)	15.8 (60.4)	9.1 (48.4)	2.4 (36.3)	−2.1 (28.2)	9.5 (49.1)
Mean daily minimum °C (°F)	−6.4 (20.5)	−6.3 (20.7)	−1.4 (29.5)	4.6 (40.3)	9.6 (49.3)	14.3 (57.7)	16.5 (61.7)	15.0 (59.0)	9.6 (49.3)	4.4 (39.9)	−0.8 (30.6)	−4.8 (23.4)	4.5 (40.2)
Record low °C (°F)	−41.9 (−43.4)	−39.0 (−38.2)	−27.3 (−17.1)	−12.1 (10.2)	−4.5 (23.9)	−1.8 (28.8)	4.4 (39.9)	−0.4 (31.3)	−7.2 (19.0)	−16.3 (2.7)	−26.3 (−15.3)	−29.6 (−21.3)	−41.9 (−43.4)
Average precipitation mm (inches)	35 (1.4)	35 (1.4)	34 (1.3)	33 (1.3)	47 (1.9)	61 (2.4)	65 (2.6)	37 (1.5)	50 (2.0)	42 (1.7)	36 (1.4)	42 (1.7)	517 (20.6)
Average extreme snow depth cm (inches)	6 (2.4)	10 (3.9)	7 (2.8)	0 (0)	0 (0)	0 (0)	0 (0)	0 (0)	0 (0)	0 (0)	1 (0.4)	4 (1.6)	10 (3.9)
Average rainy days	10	8	11	14	13	14	12	8	11	11	13	10	135
Average snowy days	17	16	10	1	0.1	0.03	0	0	0.1	1	7	16	68
Average relative humidity (%)	83.3	80.6	74.8	63.9	62.2	63.1	62.0	60.3	68.4	76.4	82.6	84.2	71.8
Mean monthly sunshine hours	50	75	127	188	279	292	319	298	215	134	64	38	2,079
Source 1: Pogoda.ru.net
Source 2: NOAA (humidity and sun 1991–2020)

== Administrative divisions ==
A map of the districts of Luhansk

The city of Luhansk is administratively divided into four districts:

- Zhovtnevyi District (until 1964 – Oktiabrskyi; de jure since 2026 – Verhunskyi)

The district includes the settlements of Velyka Vergunka, Mala Vergunka, Krasnyi Yar, and Veselenke. During the Soviet period, these settlements were part of the Vatutynskyi District, which was merged into Zhovtnevyi District in the 1960s.

- Artemivskyi District (de jure since 2026 – Vilkhivskyi)

Previously, this district had jurisdiction over the satellite town of Oleksandrivsk, the urban-type settlement of Yuvileine (Katerynivka), (Katerinivka), and the rural settlements of Teplychne and Dzerzhynske (Zrazkove or Prymerne).

- Leninskyi District (de jure since 2026 – Shevchenkivskyi)
- Kamiano-Bridskyi District

Additionally, in 2014, three territorial administrations were established by Russian authorities:

- Yuvileine
- Oleksandrivsk
- Burchak-Mykhailivka, Mykolaivka, Pionerske, and Lobachove.

Between 2020 and 2022, as part of the city administration, three structural territorial departments were formed:

- Department for Yuvileine
- Department for Oleksandrivsk (including the settlements of Dzerzhynske and Teplychne)
- Department for the town of Shchastia

There are 49 local self-organization committees in operation.

=== Symbols ===
Ukraine-recognized Flag of Luhansk

Ukraine-recognized Coat of arms of Luhansk

Russia-recognized Flag of Luhansk since 2024

Russia-recognized Coat of arms of Luhansk since 2024

== Education ==
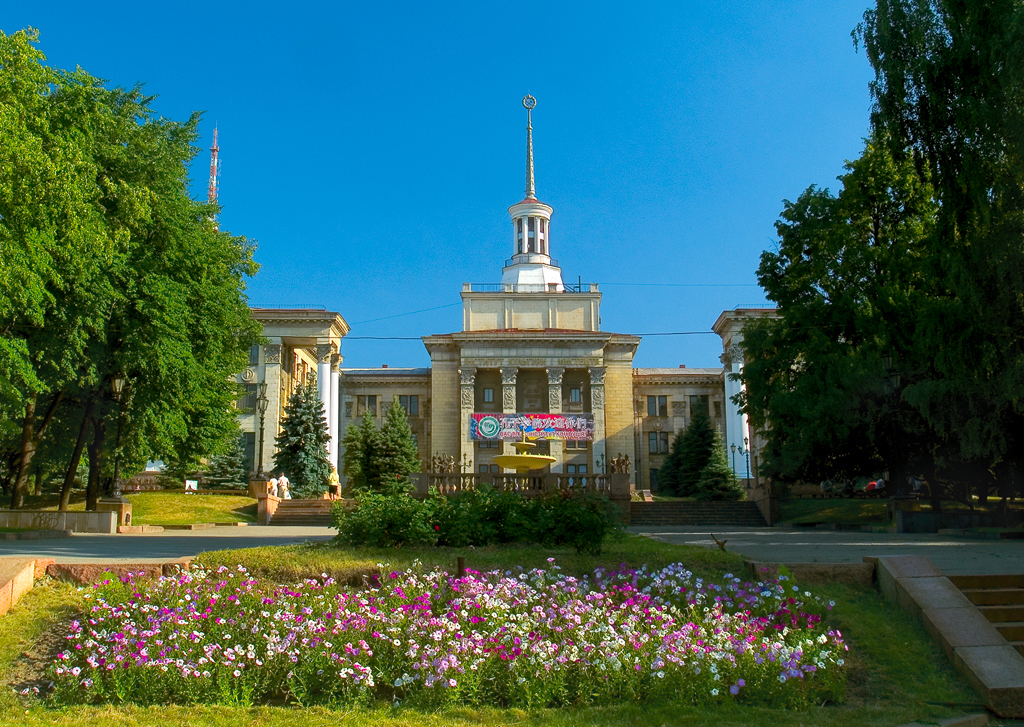
Luhansk University

Some of the more prestigious universities in Ukraine have their home in Luhansk. Luhansk is the location of the main campus of the Luhansk University, East Ukrainian National University and of Luhansk State Medical University.

== Demographics ==
Historical population

Year	Pop.	±%
1897	20,404	—
1926	71,006	+248.0%
1939	211,682	+198.1%
1959	274,520	+29.7%
1970	382,774	+39.4%

Year	Pop.	±%
1979	463,047	+21.0%
1989	496,813	+7.3%
2001	463,097	−6.8%
2011	431,109	−6.9%
2022	397,677	−7.8%

In the Ukrainian Census of 2001, 49.6% of the inhabitants declared themselves as ethnically Ukrainians and 47% as Russians. 85.3% of the population spoke Russian as their native language, while 13.7% spoke Ukrainian, 0.2% Armenian and 0.1% Belarusian.

== Sport ==
Luhansk was the home of Zorya Luhansk which plays in the Ukrainian Premier League but due to the Russian invasion and occupation of Luhansk, now plays its matches in Zaporizhzhia. The club won the 1972 Soviet Top League.

Luhansk is also the home of FC Zarya Luhansk which will play in the Russian Second League B Group 1 in the 2026 season. Formed in December 2023, it currently trains in Luhansk but plays home games in Abramovka.

The other football team was Dynamo Luhansk.

== Culture ==
=== Merheleva Ridge ===
On 7 September 2006, archaeologists in Ukraine announced that an ancient structure had been discovered near Luhansk, which the press reported as a pyramid antedating those in Egypt by at least 300 years. The stone foundations of the structure were said to resemble Aztec and Mayan pyramids in Mesoamerica. It was later concluded that the site in question was not a pyramid but was still of great interest.

== Notable people ==
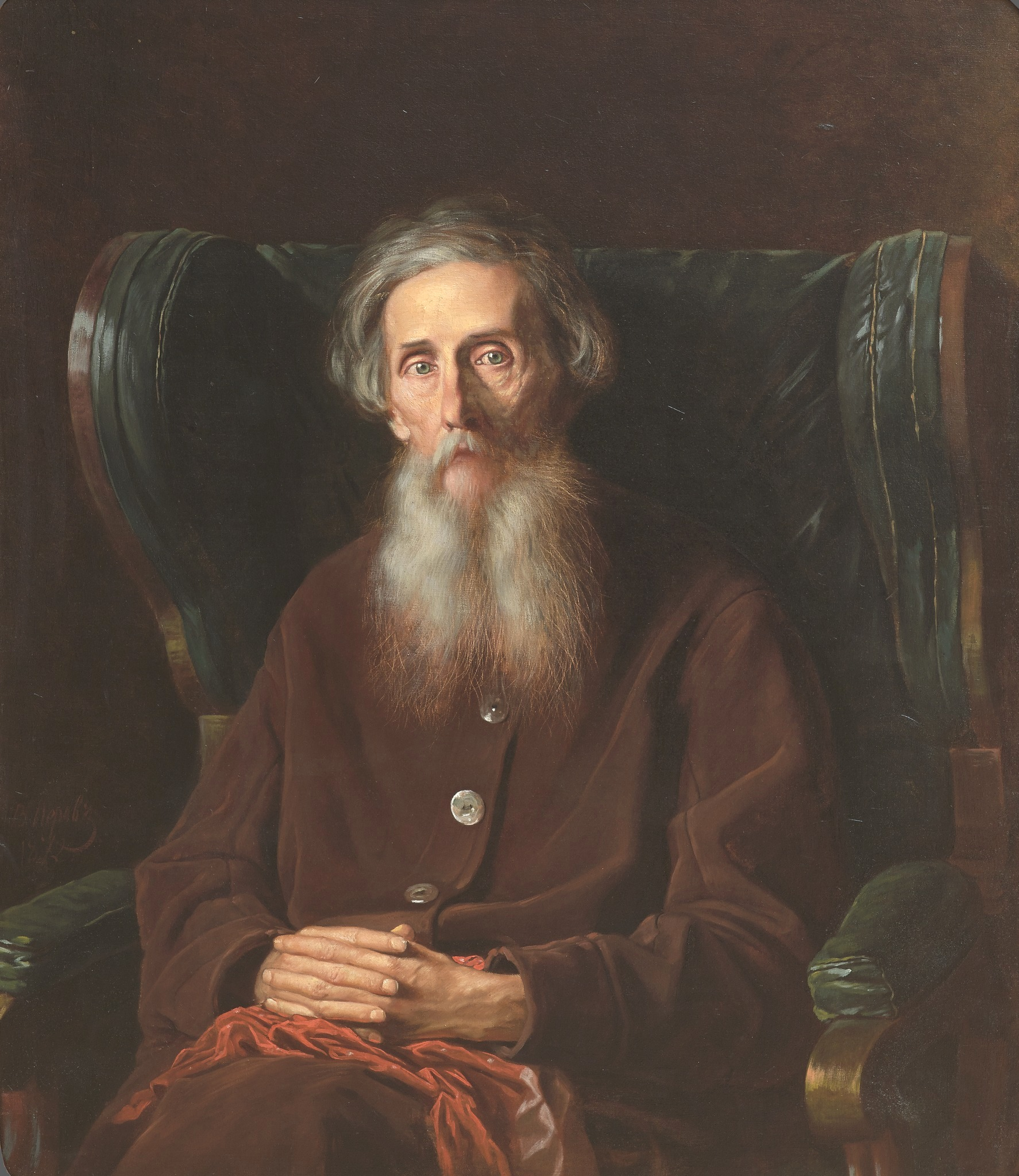
Vladimir Dal, 1872

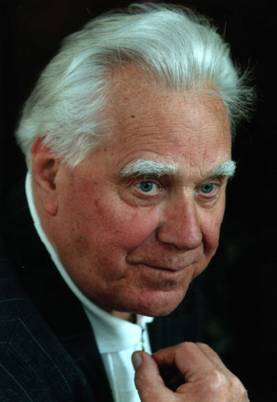
Kostiantyn Sytnyk, pre-2012

- Vladislav Anisovich (1908–1969) a Russian and Soviet painter and art educator
- Vladimir Bobrov (1915–1970) a Soviet fighter pilot and flying ace
- Nadiya Bychkova (born 1989) a Ukrainian-Slovenian ballroom and Latin American dancer
- Vladimir Dal (1801–1872), Russian lexicographer and polyglot
- Dov Feigin (1907–2000) an Israeli sculptor
- Pavel Luspekayev (1927–1970) a Soviet actor
- Yulia Malinovsky (born 1975), Israeli politician
- Mikhail Matusovsky (1915–1990), Soviet poet, songwriter
- Julia Rysina (born 1989) stage name T-DJ Milana, DJ, composer, dancer and model
- Leonid Pasechnik (born 1970) leader of the self-proclaimed Luhansk People's Republic.
- Igor Plotnitsky (born 1964) former leader of the self-proclaimed Luhansk People's Republic.
- Andriy Portnov (born 1973) a Ukrainian lawyer and politician.
- Aleksandr Ptushko (1900–1973) a Soviet animation and fantasy film director
- Nikolay Shmatko (1943–2020), sculptor, professor and painter
- Tatyana Snezhina (1972–1995) a Russian poet and singer-songwriter.
- Kostiantyn Sytnyk (1926–2017) a Ukrainian and Soviet scientist and academician
- Kliment Voroshilov (1881–1969), Soviet military commander

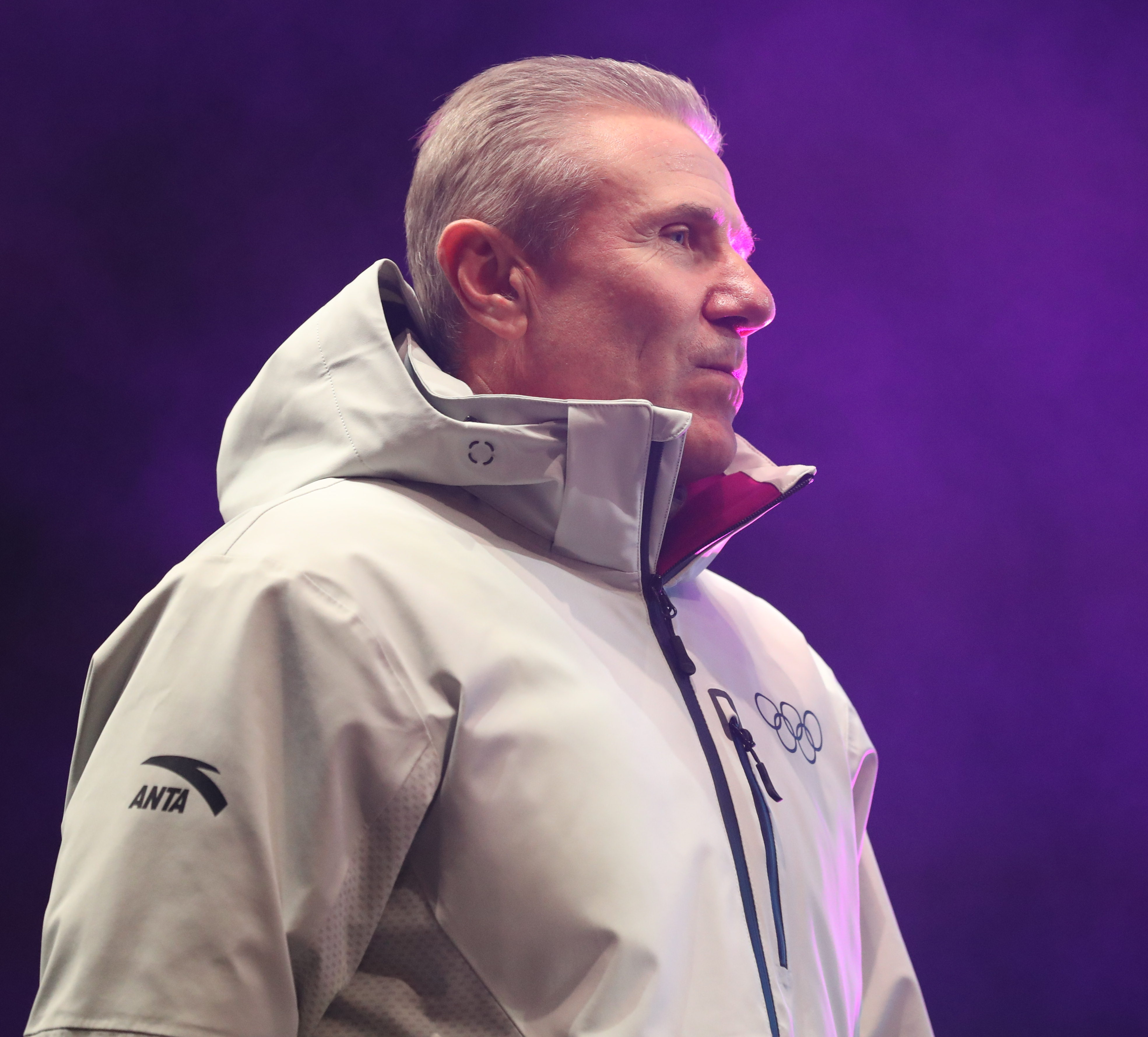
Sergey Bubka, 2020

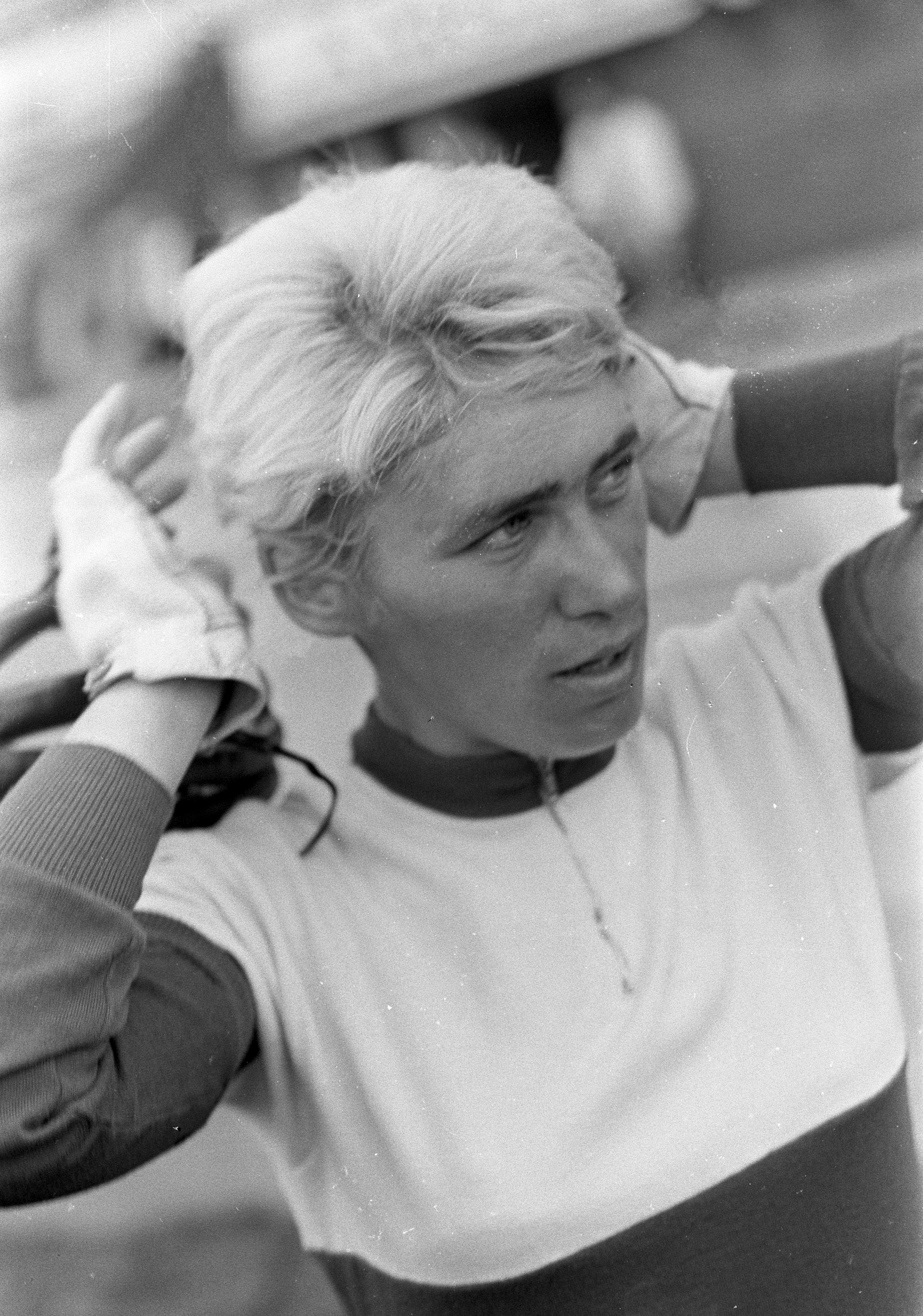
Irina Kirichenko, 1967

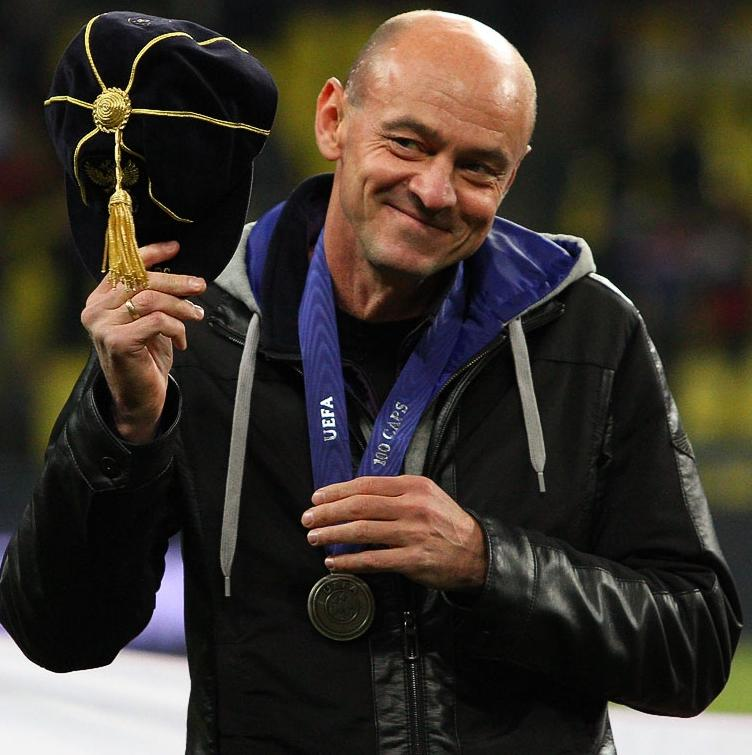
Viktor Onopko, 2011

=== Sport ===
- Sergey Andreyev (born 1956) a football manager and a former player with 617 club caps and 26 for the Soviet Union
- Valeriy Brumel (1942–2003), a Soviet high jumper; silver medallist at the 1960 Summer Olympics and gold medallist at the 1964 Summer Olympics
- Viktor Bryzhin (born 1962) a former sprinter, team gold medallist at the 1988 Summer Olympics.
- Yelyzaveta Bryzhina (born 1989), sprinter, team bronze medallist at the 2012 Summer Olympics
- Sergey Bubka (born 1963), Soviet and Ukrainian pole vaulter, former World Record holder, and gold medallist at the 1988 Summer Olympics
- Vasiliy Bubka (born 1960), Soviet and Ukrainian pole vaulter
- Fedor Emelianenko (born 1976), Russian heavyweight mixed martial arts and judoka
- Vyacheslav Glazkov (born 1984) boxer, bronze medallist at the 2008 Summer Olympics
- Irina Kirichenko (1937–2020) a Soviet sprint cyclist
- Serhiy Malyi (born 1990) footballer with over 150 club caps and 46 for Kazakhstan
- Viktor Onopko (born 1969), Russian football player with 462 club caps and 109 for Russia
- Sergei Semak (born 1976), footballer and manager with 552 club caps and 65 for Russia
- Andriy Serdinov (born 1982), butterfly swimmer, bronze medallist at the 2004 Summer Olympics.
- Oleh Shelayev (born 1976), footballer with over 400 club caps and 36 for Ukraine
- Anton Shoutvin (born 1989), Israeli basketball player
- Tetyana Skachko (born 1954) long jumper, bronze medallist at the 1980 Summer Olympics
- Tetyana Tereshchuk-Antipova (born 1969), hurdler, bronze medallist at the 2004 Summer Olympics
- Sergei Yuran (born 1969), football player with 276 club caps and 25 for Russia
- Oleksandr Zavarov (born 1961), Soviet and Ukrainian football player and coach with over 450 club caps and 41 for the Soviet Union

== International relations ==
Luhansk is twinned with:

- Cardiff, United Kingdom
- Lublin, Poland
- Székesfehérvár, Hungary
- Daqing, China
- Saint-Étienne, France
- Pernik, Bulgaria

== Gallery ==
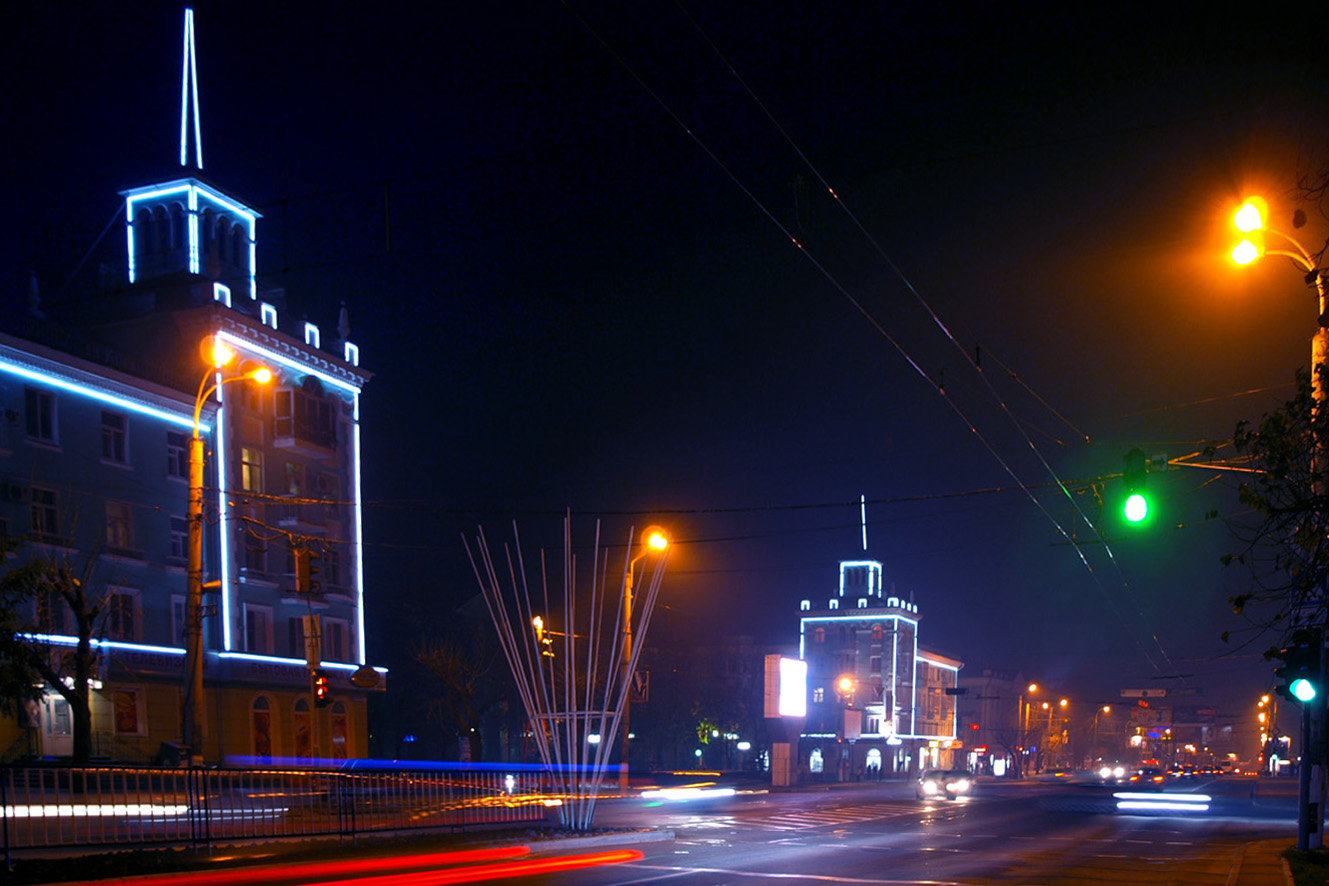
Radianska Street at night

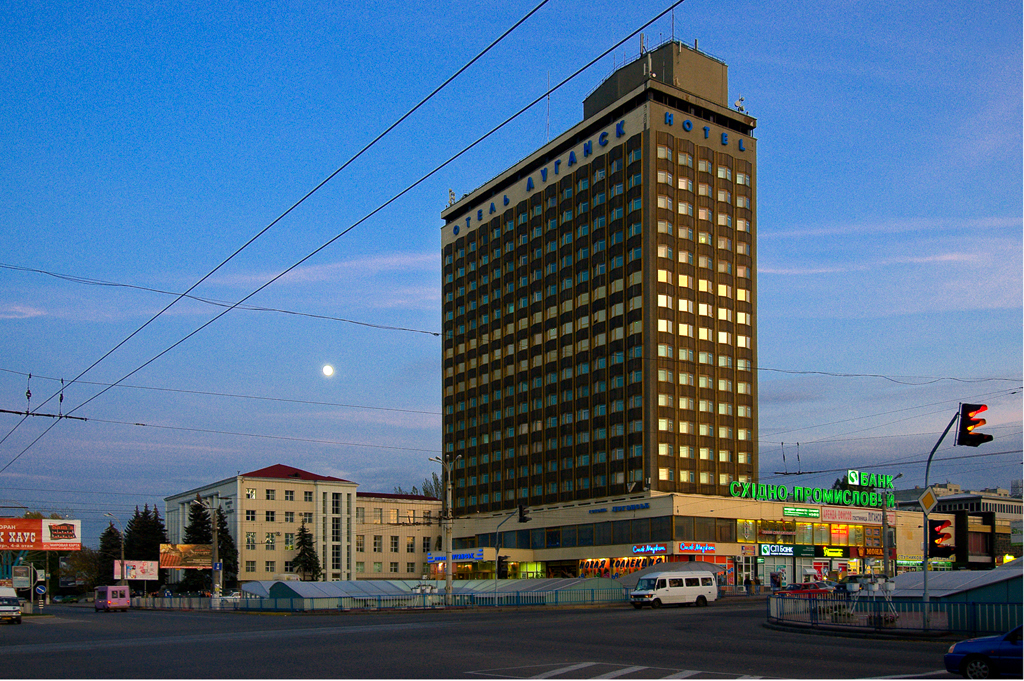
Luhansk Hotel

Hotel Ukraine

St. Volodymyr Cathedral

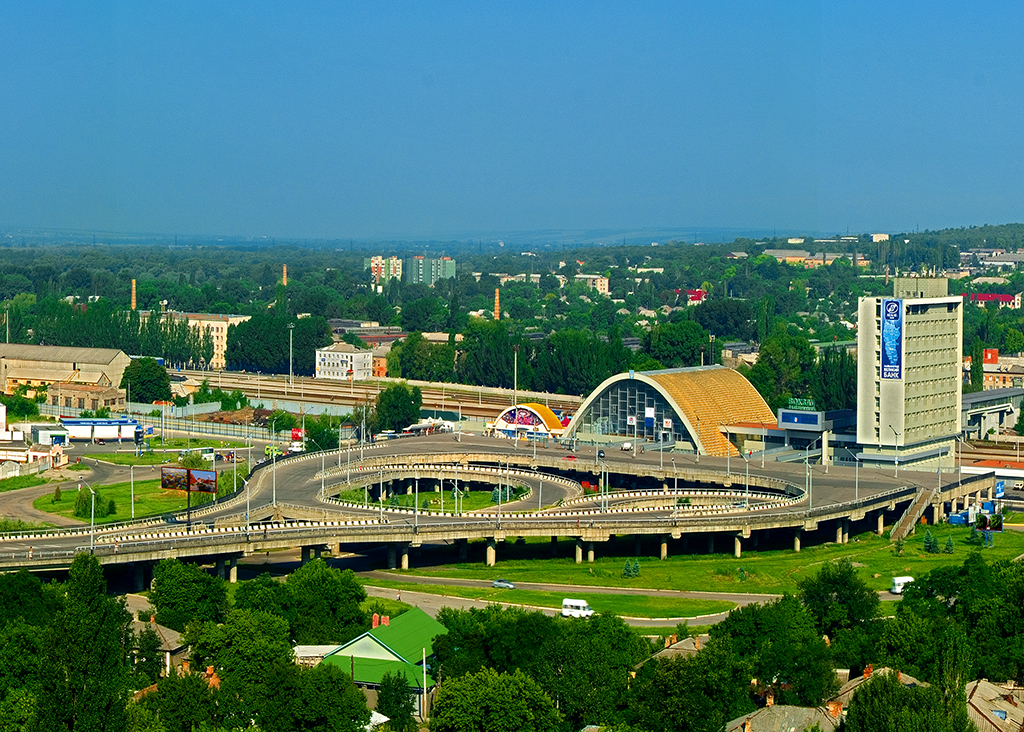
Luhansk railway station

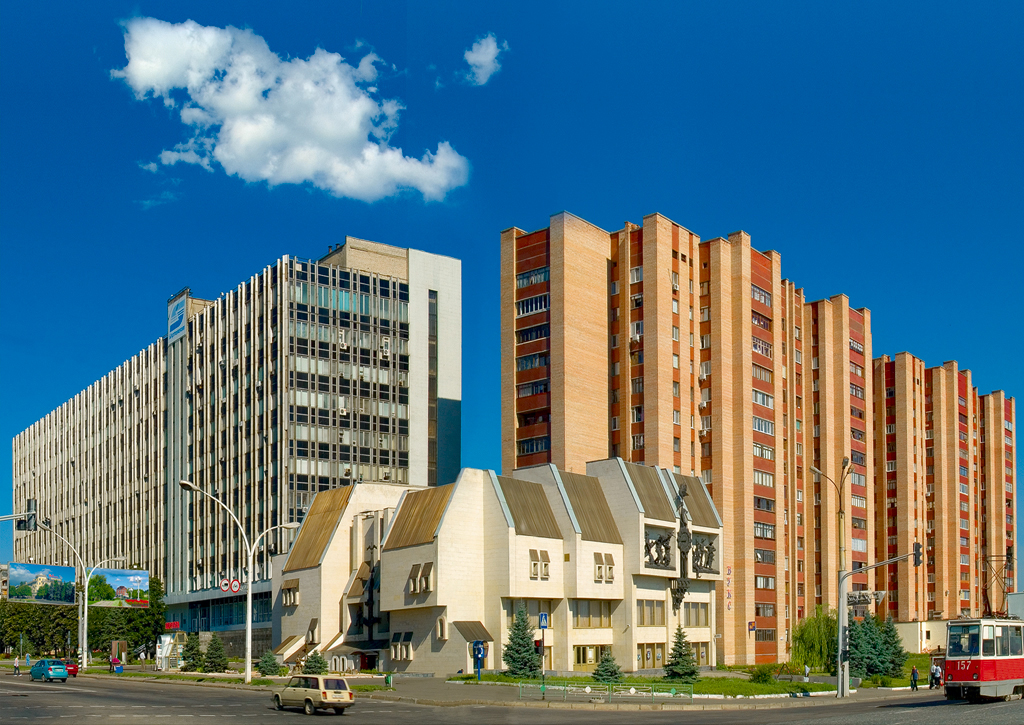
Soviet buildings in the central city

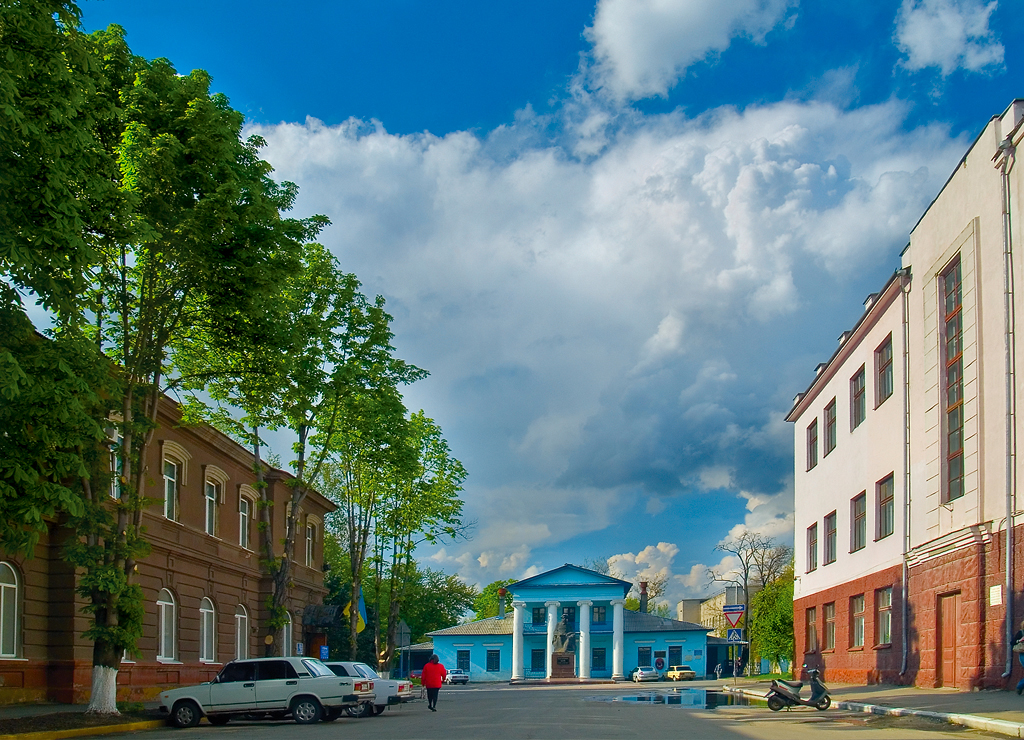
City old hospital

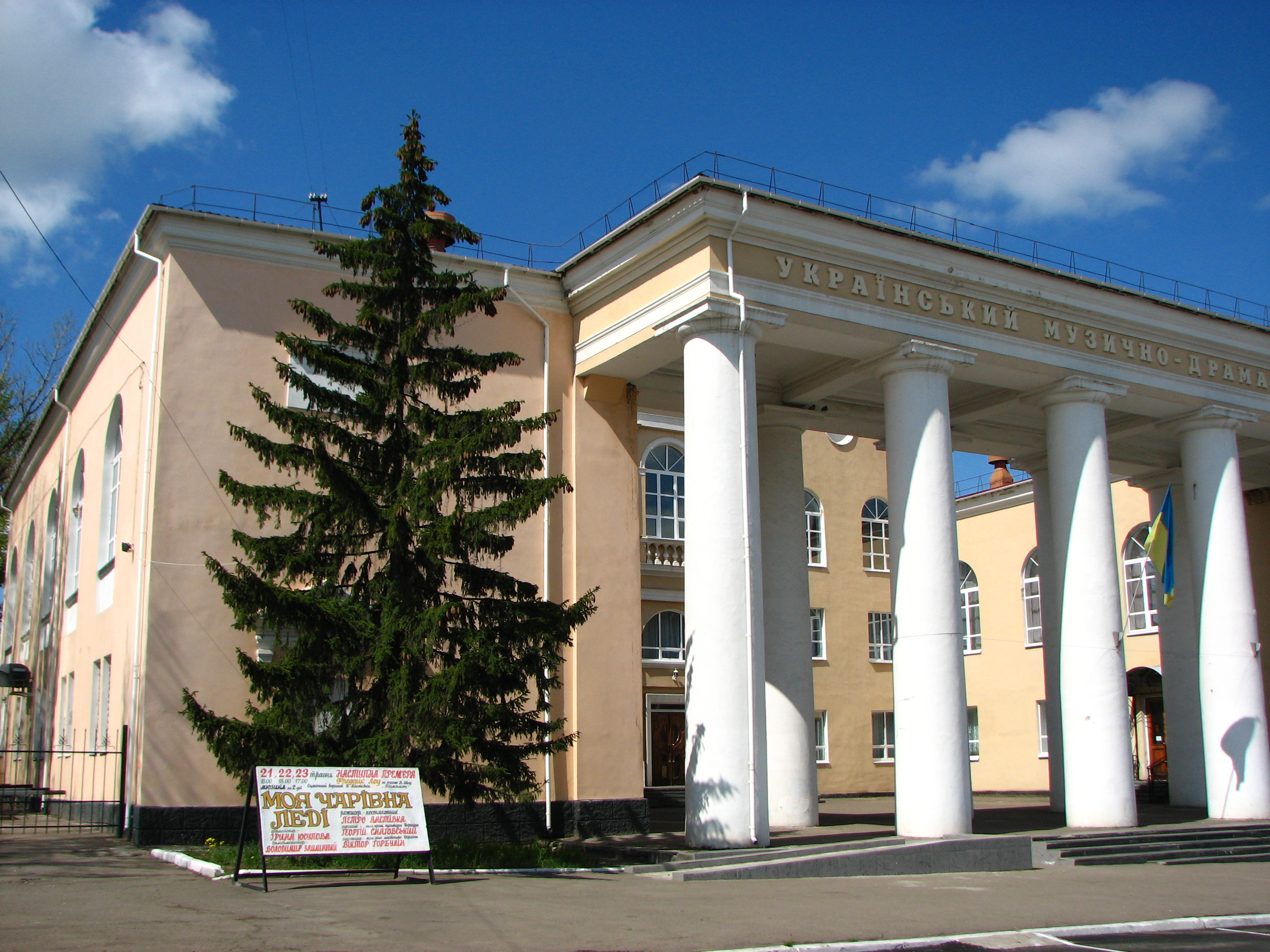
Luhansk Academic Ukrainian Drama Theatre

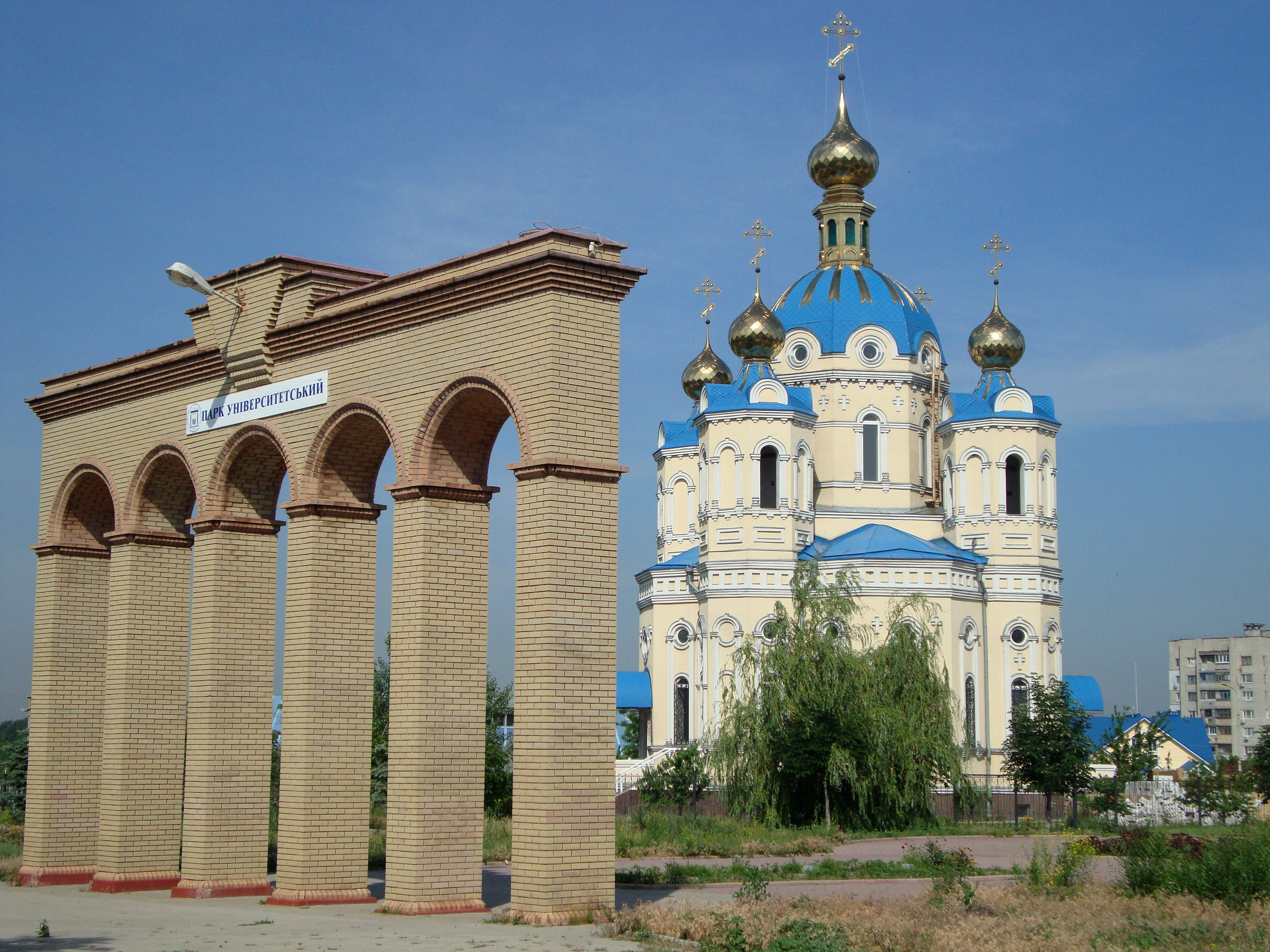
Saint Alexander Nevsky Church

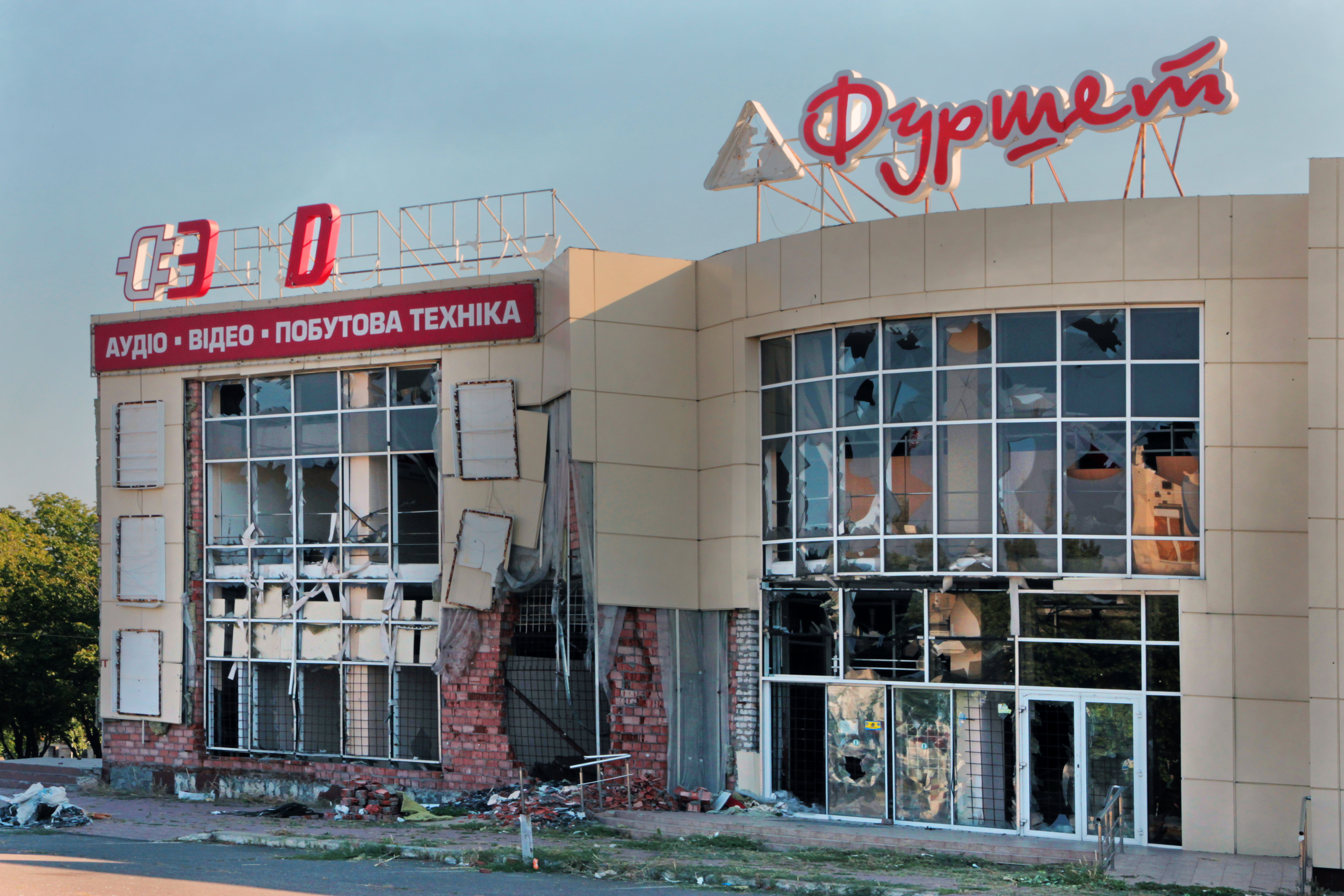
A consumer electronics and appliance store, heavily damaged as a consequence of the Russo-Ukrainian War.

== See also ==
- Luhansk Airlines
- Luhansk Airport
- Luhanskteplovoz
- Merheleva Ridge
- Aviation Technical Museum (Luhansk)
