= T-DJ Milana =

Ukrainian DJ, composer, dancer and model (born 1989)

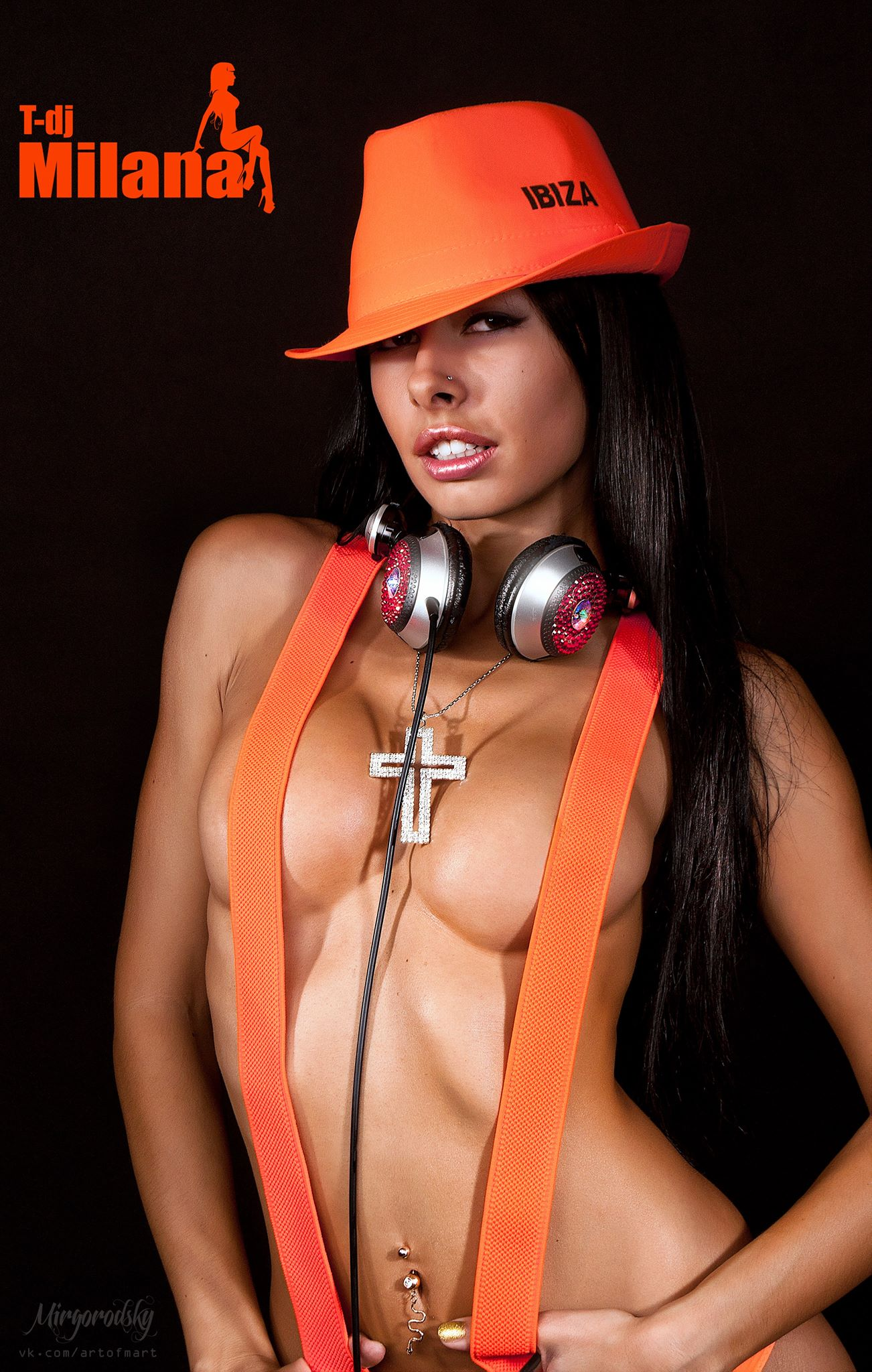
- Born: Julia Igorevna Rysina; February 12, 1989 (age 36); Luhansk, Ukraine
- Years active: 2007—present
- Known for: topless-DJ (house, tech house, techno)
- Website: djmilana.com

T-DJ Milana (Julia Igorevna Rysina; born February 12, 1989, in Luhansk) is a Ukrainian DJ, composer, dancer and model, best known for performing in top-less in her sets.

== Biography ==
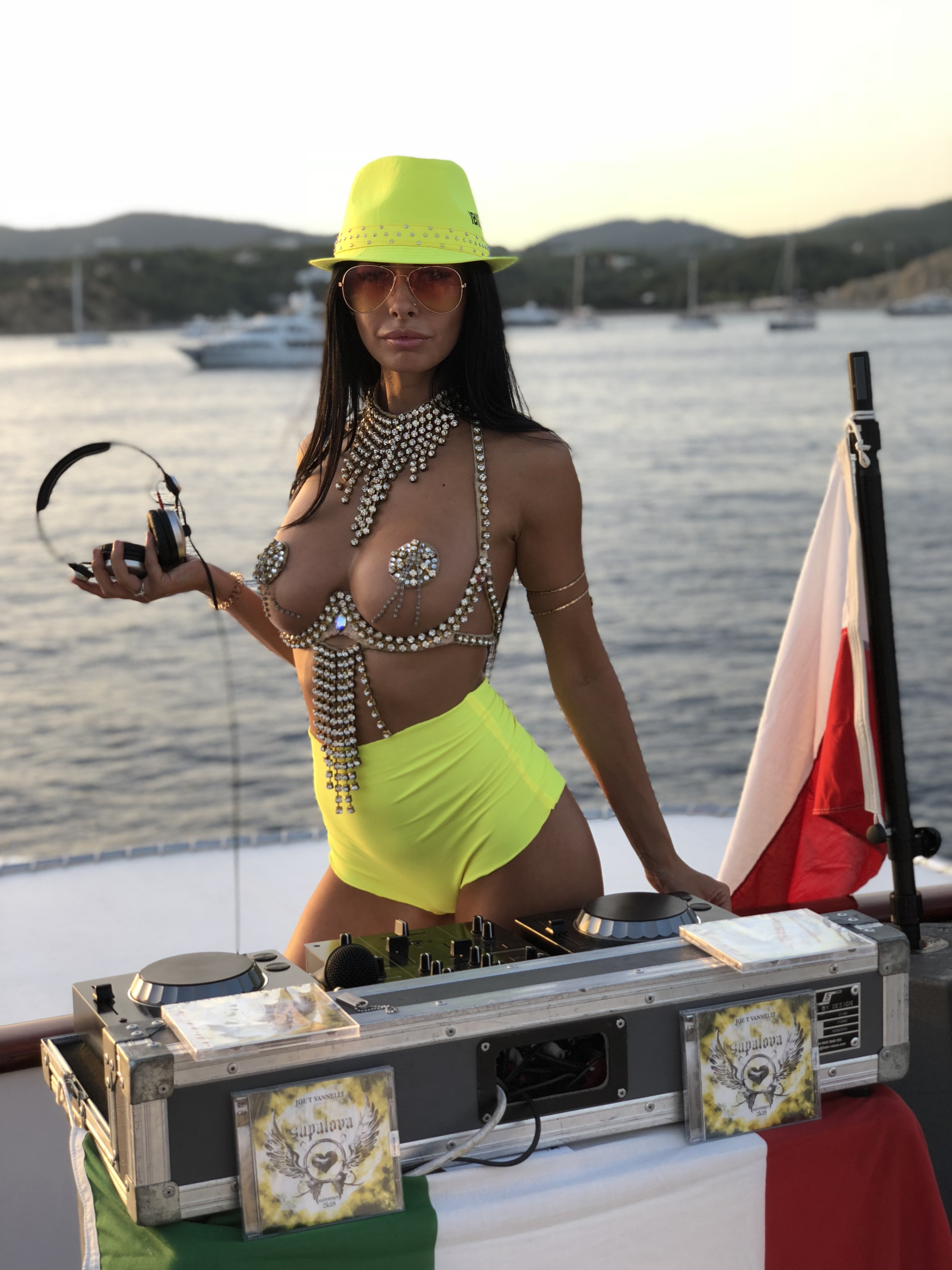
T-DJ Milana in July 2018

Julia Rysina was born on February 12, 1989, in Luhansk. Until 2007, she had been engaged in the modeling business, but then she moved to Kharkiv, where she began her career of a topless DJ at the MISTO club and formed the Quattro Hand's Stuff project together with DJ Viniloff.

In 2009, T-Dj Milana started a two-month tour of the clubs in Bulgaria, Croatia and Macedonia, after which she was invited as a special guest on the talk show The Late Show with Azis.

In 2010, she presented her first track "Feel, Real" and its video clip, and also organized a week tour in Indonesia and repeated tours in Bulgaria and Russia. By 2011, Julia's single was used and supported by a number of famous DJs, so Paul Oakenfold used it in his episode 094 "Perfecto Podcast!", and James Grant – in his radio show "Anjunadeep".

In 2013-2014, DJ Milana twice participated in the TV show "Says Ukraine" on the "Ukraine" channel. In the August of the same year, Milana made a performance on the island of Ibiza in Spain for the first time, where she immediately received the status of a resident of a major boat party "Oceanbeat Ibiza". Also in 2013, Julia starred in the video for the song "Gimme some more" by the Bulgarian singer Valya. Since 2014, she continues to work as a resident at the "Oceanbeat Ibiza", as well as in the clubs "Bora-Bora Ibiza" and "Top 21 Ibiza".
