= Merheleva Ridge =

Burial complex in Ukraine

- Interactive map of Merheleva Ridge
- 48°24′13″N 38°56′20″E
- Location: near Perevalsk, Luhansk Oblast, Ukraine

Merheleva Ridge (Ukrainian: Мергелева гряда, also transliterated Mergeleva; Russian: Мергелевая гряда, romanized: Mergelevaya gryada, literally "Marlstone Ridge", "Marl Ridge") is the site of an Eneolithic temple and burial complex consisting primarily of four large stone mounds or kurgans situated near Perevalsk, Luhansk Oblast, Ukraine, about 30 km to the west-to-southwest of the city of Luhansk. "Merheleva" is the Ukrainian adjective from the word merhel, marlstone, which is a type of limestone common in the region. Supposedly the site was built in about 4000 BC, corresponding to the Dnieper-Donets or early Yamna culture, and remained in use throughout the Bronze Age and well into the Iron Age, until 5th century BC Sarmatia. It was discovered in 2004, and the discovery officially announced on 7 September 2006.

== Discovery and excavation ==
The site was discovered in 2004 by school children participating in an archaeology camp organised by Alchevsk history teacher Vladimir Paramonov, who has been organising expeditions of schoolchildren to the hill range since 1995.

It is believed that much of the site was constructed about 3000 BC, in the early Bronze Age. The site is believed to be a complex of temples and sacrificial altars topping a hill with sides sculpted into steps.

Viktor Klochko, the archaeologist in charge of the dig site and deputy Minister of Science of the Tourism and Protection of Cultural Heritage Department of the Lugansk regional administration, said that the discovery was of international significance as the first monument of its kind found in Eastern Europe:

"It changes our whole conception of the social structure and the level of development of the cattle breeders and farmers who were the direct ancestors of most European peoples."

Archaeologists have confirmed that evidence of graves has been found at the Luhansk site, which they believe to have been the result of human sacrifice, rather than due to its use as a burial ground.

According to The Guardian, remains of sacrifice victims, ashes and ceramics have been found at the site, but no jewellery or treasure. The complex has a base area of three-quarters of a square mile, is estimated to be 60 metres (192 ft) high, and was probably used for 2,000 years.

In Kurgan No. 4, three graves of the Berezhnovsko-Maevskaya group of the Late Bronze Age Srubna culture were found above three graves of the Early Bronze Age Catacomb culture, with 13 graves and sacrificial pits. One of the skulls found was dated to ca. 3000 BC. Four stone statues were found near the graves.

== Misidentification as pyramid and clarification ==
Initial reports indicated that archaeologists had discovered a pyramidal structure.

Klochko blamed the press: "I'm not sure where the pyramid idea came from - the media got it wrong," says Klochko. "We didn't find anything like an Egyptian pyramid. Though the site is on a hill. But it's interesting enough in its own right."

== See also ==
- Dnieper-Donets culture
- Yamna culture
- Catacomb culture
- Srubna culture
