= Sergei Semak =

Russian football manager (born 1976)

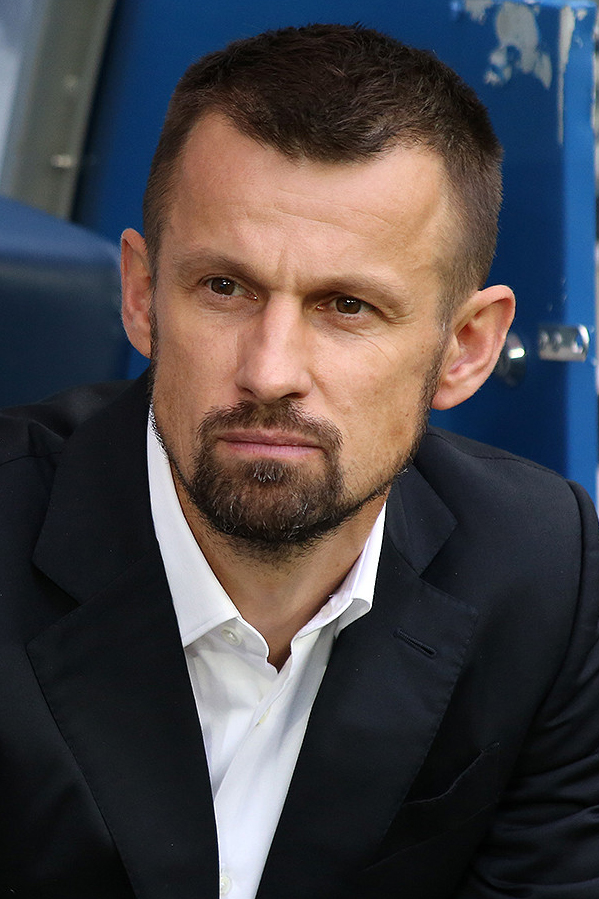
- Semak with Zenit in 2018

Personal information
- Full name: Sergei Bogdanovich Semak
- Date of birth: 27 February 1976 (age 50)
- Place of birth: Sychanske, Ukrainian SSR, Soviet Union
- Height: 1.78 m (5 ft 10 in)
- Position: Midfielder

Team information
- Current team: Zenit Saint Petersburg (manager)

Youth career
- Luhansk Football Academy

Senior career*
| Years | Team | Apps | (Gls) |
| 1992 | Presnya Moscow | 19 | (4) |
| 1992 | Karelia Petrozavodsk | 3 | (0) |
| 1993–1994 | Asmaral Moscow | 21 | (3) |
| 1993–1994 | Asmaral-d Moscow | 26 | (5) |
| 1994–2004 | CSKA Moscow | 282 | (68) |
| 2005–2006 | Paris Saint-Germain | 26 | (1) |
| 2006–2007 | Moscow | 57 | (12) |
| 2008–2010 | Rubin Kazan | 61 | (12) |
| 2010–2013 | Zenit Saint Petersburg | 48 | (9) |
| Total | | 543 | (114) |

International career
| 1995 | Russia U-20 | 4 | (1) |
| 1995–1996 | Russia U-21 | 12 | (3) |
| 1997–2010 | Russia | 65 | (4) |

Managerial career
- 2014: Zenit Saint Petersburg (caretaker)
- 2017–2018: Ufa
- 2018–: Zenit Saint Petersburg
- * Club domestic league appearances and goals

Sergei Bogdanovich Semak (Russian: Серге́й Богда́нович Сема́к [sʲɪrˈɡʲej bɐɡˈdanəvʲɪtɕ sʲɪˈmak]; born 27 February 1976) is a Russian football manager and a former international midfielder who manages Russian Premier League side Zenit Saint Petersburg.

== Early life ==
Semak was born in the village of Sychanske, Voroshilovgrad Oblast into a peasant family of modest economical background. He was an excellent student and had an ideal behavior. When he was a child his teachers would argue as to whether he would become a mathematician or a football player.

He left Ukraine shortly before the USSR collapsed, but his parents stayed there. He would become a Russian naturalized citizen.

His older brother Andrei Semak and younger brother Nikolai Semak were also professional footballers.

== Club career ==
Semak started training football at the Luhansk football school. In 1992, he signed in Presnya Moscow who played in the Russian Top Division. After 19 matches scoring 4 goals he was sold to Karelia Petrozavodsk, but in 1993 returned to Presnya Moscow, which had changed its name to Asmaral Moscow.

In 1994, Semak was noted and signed by CSKA Moscow. He became the club's captain and leader. With the club he won the Russian Premier League in 2003, the Russian Cup in 2002 and 2005. He left the club after it finished third in the group stage of the UEFA Champions League 2004–05 and did not move on to the knockout stage. This was despite his hat-trick against Paris Saint-Germain in the final group game.

In 2005, Semak then moved to the team he scored the hat-trick against, Paris Saint-Germain, but failed to settle, scoring just one goal. After just one season he returned to Russia.

In 2006, Semak signed for Moscow, where he stayed until 2008 when he moved to Rubin Kazan. In Rubin Semak was moved from the positions of striker and attacking midfielder to the position of a defensive midfielder. At Rubin Kazan he became the captain and leader of the team, and led it to its first two championship titles in 2008 and 2009.

In August 2010, he transferred to Zenit Saint Petersburg. In his three seasons with Zenit, he won the Russian Premier League twice and Russian Super Cup once. He scored his last goal in February 2013 in a Europa League victory over Liverpool.

== International career ==
Semak made his international debut for the Russia national team in 1997 and took part in the 2002 FIFA World Cup in South Korea and Japan.

Having lost his place in the national team with the arrival of Guus Hiddink in 2006, Semak missed out on Russia's Euro 2008 qualifying campaign, but was recalled to the national team, just prior to the Euro 2008 finals. Semak captained the Russia national team in their first Euro 2008 warm-up friendly against Kazakhstan, and during the rest of the campaign. Semak had a good performance in the crucial match against Greece and provided an assist for the only goal Russia scored with a skilled bicycle kick pass from a wide angle. Another notable performance in Euro 2008 came in the quarter-finals during which he was playing his 50th game for his country, when his precise left-wing cross was volleyed in by Roman Pavlyuchenko against the Netherlands.

== Managerial career ==
After his retirement, Semak was named as assistant coach of Zenit Saint Petersburg. He was appointed interim coach of the club after the sacking of Luciano Spalletti on 10 March 2014. He held the position until 18 March when André Villas-Boas was appointed as the team manager.

On 30 December 2016, he was appointed a manager of the Russian Premier League club FC Ufa.

On 29 May 2018, he returned to Zenit St. Petersburg, signing a two-year contract with one-year extension option. In his first year, he won the 2018–19 Russian Premier League. He led Zenit to the title again in the 2019–20 Russian Premier League. On 25 July 2020, he sealed the double for the club by winning the 2019–20 Russian Cup. On 2 May 2021, Zenit secured their third title in a row in a 6-1 victory over second-place FC Lokomotiv Moscow. On 30 April 2022, Zenit secured their fourth title in a row. On 7 May 2023, Zenit secured their fifth title in a row. On 25 May 2024, Zenit won their sixth consecutive title. After the deciding game, Zenit extended their contract with Semak until June 2030. On 2 June 2024, Zenit secured another double by winning the 2023–24 Russian Cup. Zenit won their 7th league title under Semak in the 2025–26 season.

== Career statistics ==
=== Club ===
| Club | Season | League | | | Cup | | Continental | | Other | | Total | |
| Club | Season | Division | Apps | Goals | Apps | Goals | Apps | Goals | Apps | Goals | Apps | Goals |
|---|---|---|---|---|---|---|---|---|---|---|---|---|
| Presnya Moscow | 1992 | Russian Second League | 19 | 4 | 0 | 0 | – | | – | | 19 | 4 |
| Karelia Petrozavodsk | 1992 | Russian Second League | 3 | 0 | – | | – | | – | | 3 | 0 |
| Asmaral Moscow | 1993 | Russian Premier League | 8 | 1 | 1 | 0 | – | | – | | 9 | 1 |
| Asmaral Moscow | 1994 | Russian First League | 13 | 2 | 0 | 0 | – | | – | | 13 | 2 |
| Asmaral Moscow | Total | | 21 | 3 | 1 | 0 | 0 | 0 | 0 | 0 | 22 | 3 |
| Asmaral-d Moscow | 1993 | Russian Second League | 22 | 3 | 2 | 3 | – | | – | | 24 | 6 |
| Asmaral-d Moscow | 1994 | Russian Third League | 4 | 2 | – | | – | | – | | 4 | 2 |
| Asmaral-d Moscow | Total | | 26 | 5 | 2 | 3 | 0 | 0 | 0 | 0 | 28 | 8 |
| CSKA Moscow | 1994 | Russian Premier League | 5 | 1 | 2 | 1 | 1 (Note: Appearance in UEFA Cup Winners' Cup) | 0 | – | | 8 | 2 |
| CSKA Moscow | 1995 | Russian Premier League | 22 | 4 | 1 | 2 | – | | – | | 23 | 6 |
| CSKA Moscow | 1996 | Russian Premier League | 31 | 6 | 1 | 0 | 4 (Note: Appearances in UEFA Cup) | 0 | – | | 36 | 6 |
| CSKA Moscow | 1997 | Russian Premier League | 32 | 5 | 2 | 2 | – | | – | | 34 | 7 |
| CSKA Moscow | 1998 | Russian Premier League | 29 | 9 | 3 | 0 | – | | – | | 32 | 9 |
| CSKA Moscow | 1999 | Russian Premier League | 29 | 12 | 4 | 1 | 2 (Note: Appearances in UEFA Champions League) | 0 | – | | 35 | 13 |
| CSKA Moscow | 2000 | Russian Premier League | 30 | 8 | 5 | 1 | 2 | 0 | – | | 37 | 9 |
| CSKA Moscow | 2001 | Russian Premier League | 26 | 5 | 0 | 0 | – | | – | | 26 | 5 |
| CSKA Moscow | 2002 | Russian Premier League | 24 | 6 | 3 | 2 | 2 | 0 | – | | 29 | 8 |
| CSKA Moscow | 2003 | Russian Premier League | 24 | 7 | 0 | 0 | 0 | 0 | 0 | 0 | 24 | 7 |
| CSKA Moscow | 2004 | Russian Premier League | 30 | 5 | 4 | 0 | 10 | 4 | 1 (Note: Appearance in Russian Super Cup) | 1 | 45 | 10 |
| CSKA Moscow | Total | | 282 | 68 | 25 | 9 | 21 | 4 | 1 | 1 | 329 | 82 |
| Paris Saint-Germain | 2004–05 | Ligue 1 | 13 | 1 | 1 | 0 | – | | – | | 14 | 1 |
| Paris Saint-Germain | 2005–06 | Ligue 1 | 13 | 0 | 2 | 0 | – | | 2 (Note: Appearances in Coupe de la Ligue) | 0 | 17 | 0 |
| Paris Saint-Germain | Total | | 26 | 1 | 3 | 0 | 0 | 0 | 2 | 0 | 31 | 1 |
| Moscow | 2006 | Russian Premier League | 28 | 7 | 3 | 0 | – | | 4 (Note: Appearances in UEFA Intertoto Cup) | 0 | 35 | 7 |
| Moscow | 2007 | Russian Premier League | 29 | 5 | 9 | 2 | – | | – | | 38 | 7 |
| Moscow | Total | | 57 | 12 | 12 | 2 | 0 | 0 | 4 | 0 | 73 | 14 |
| Rubin Kazan | 2008 | Russian Premier League | 27 | 5 | 0 | 0 | – | | – | | 27 | 5 |
| Rubin Kazan | 2009 | Russian Premier League | 26 | 6 | 2 | 0 | 6 | 0 | 1 | 0 | 35 | 6 |
| Rubin Kazan | 2010 | Russian Premier League | 8 | 1 | 0 | 0 | 2 (Note: Appearances in UEFA Europa League) | 1 | 0 | 0 | 10 | 2 |
| Rubin Kazan | Total | | 61 | 12 | 2 | 0 | 8 | 1 | 1 | 0 | 72 | 13 |
| Zenit Saint Petersburg | 2010 | Russian Premier League | 12 | 2 | – | | 5 (Note: Two appearances in UEFA Champions League, three appearances in UEFA Europa League) | 0 | – | | 17 | 2 |
| Zenit Saint Petersburg | 2011–12 | Russian Premier League | 20 | 5 | 2 | 0 | 7 (Note: Five appearances, one goal in UEFA Champions League, two appearances, one goal in UEFA Europa League) | 2 | 1 | 0 | 30 | 7 |
| Zenit Saint Petersburg | 2012–13 | Russian Premier League | 16 | 2 | 2 | 1 | 6 (Note: Three appearances in UEFA Champions League, three appearances, one goal in UEFA Europa League) | 1 | 1 | 0 | 25 | 4 |
| Zenit Saint Petersburg | Total | | 48 | 9 | 4 | 1 | 18 | 3 | 2 | 0 | 72 | 13 |
| Career total | | | 474 | 102 | 46 | 12 | 47 | 8 | 10 | 1 | 577 | 123 |

=== International ===
Appearances and goals by national team and year
| National team | Year | Apps | Goals |
|---|---|---|---|
| Russia | 1997 | 1 | 0 |
| Russia | 1998 | 9 | 0 |
| Russia | 1999 | 5 | 0 |
| Russia | 2000 | 6 | 0 |
| Russia | 2001 | 8 | 1 |
| Russia | 2002 | 5 | 2 |
| Russia | 2003 | 4 | 1 |
| Russia | 2004 | 0 | 0 |
| Russia | 2005 | 4 | 0 |
| Russia | 2006 | 1 | 0 |
| Russia | 2007 | 0 | 0 |
| Russia | 2008 | 12 | 0 |
| Russia | 2009 | 9 | 0 |
| Russia | 2010 | 1 | 0 |
| Total | | 65 | 4 |

Scores and results list Russia's goal tally first, score column indicates score after each Semak goal.

List of international goals scored by Sergei Semak
| No. | Date | Venue | Opponent | Score | Result | Competition |
|---|---|---|---|---|---|---|
| 1 | 6 June 2001 | Stade Josy Barthel, Luxembourg, Luxembourg | Luxembourg | 2–1 | 2–1 | 2002 FIFA World Cup qualification |
| 2 | 16 October 2002 | Central Stadium, Volgograd, Russia | Albania | 2–1 | 4–1 | UEFA Euro 2004 qualifying |
| 3 | 16 October 2002 | Central Stadium, Volgograd, Russia | Albania | 4–1 | 4–1 | UEFA Euro 2004 qualifying |
| 4 | 20 August 2003 | Lokomotiv Stadium, Moscow, Russia | Israel | 1–2 | 1–2 | Friendly |

== Managerial statistics ==
As of match played 21 November 2026

Managerial record by team and tenure
| Team | Nat | From | To | Record | | | | | | | | |
| Team | Nat | From | To | M | W | D | L | GF | GA | GD | Win % | Ref. |
|---|---|---|---|---|---|---|---|---|---|---|---|---|
| Zenit St. Petersburg | (Russia) | 10 March 2014 | 19 March 2014 | 2 | 1 | 0 | 1 | 2 | 2 | +0 | 50.00 | |
| Ufa | (Russia) | 1 January 2017 | 29 May 2018 | 46 | 17 | 14 | 15 | 46 | 44 | +2 | 36.96 | — |
| Zenit St. Petersburg | (Russia) | 30 May 2018 | present | 355 | 222 | 73 | 60 | 702 | 308 | +394 | 62.54 | — |
| Total | | | | 403 | 240 | 87 | 76 | 750 | 354 | +396 | 59.55 | |

== Honours ==
=== Player ===
CSKA Moscow

- Russian Premier League: 2003
- Russian Cup: 2001–02
- Russian Super Cup: 2004

Paris Saint-Germain

- Coupe de France: 2005–06

Rubin Kazan

- Russian Premier League: 2008, 2009
- Russian Super Cup: 2010

Zenit

- Russian Premier League: 2010, 2011–12
- Russian Super Cup: 2011

Russia

- UEFA European Championship: 2008 bronze medalist

Individual

- In the list of 33 best football players of the championship of Russia (8): 1997, 1998, 1999, 2000, 2001, 2002, 2008, 2009
- Member of Grigory Fedotov club

=== Manager ===
Zenit

- Russian Premier League: 2018–19, 2019–20, 2020–21, 2021–22, 2022–23, 2023–24, 2025–26
- Russian Cup: 2019–20, 2023–24
- Russian Super Cup: 2020, 2021, 2022, 2023, 2024, 2026

Individual

- Russian Premier League Coach of the Season: 2020–21, 2021–22, 2025–26
- Russian Premier League Coach of the Month: August 2022, July/August 2024, April 2026, October 2026.

Sporting positions
| Preceded by Aleksei Berezutski | Russia national football team captain 2008–2009 | Succeeded by Andrei Arshavin |
