= Sychanske =

Village in Markivka Raion, Luhansk Oblast, Ukraine

Coordinates: 49°25′56″N 39°23′52″E

Sychanske (Ukrainian: Сичанське) is a village in the Starobilsk Raion (district) in the Luhansk Oblast (province) of eastern Ukraine.
