= 1991 Soviet Top League =

54th season of top-tier football league in Soviet Union

Soviet Top League
- Season: 1991
- Dates: 10 March – 2 November 1991
- Champions: CSKA Moscow (7th title)
- Relegated: none (7 clubs withdrew)
- Champions League: CSKA Moscow (for Russia)
- Cup Winners' Cup: Spartak Moscow (for Russia)
- UEFA Cup: Dynamo Moscow; Torpedo Moscow (for Russia)
- Top goalscorer: (18) Igor Kolyvanov (Dynamo Moscow)
- Biggest home win: Spartak – Dynamo M. 7–1 (26th)
- Biggest away win: Dynamo M. – Torpedo 1–4 (18th); Metalurh – Chornomorets 1–4 (16th)
- Highest scoring: Spartak – Dynamo M. 7–1 (26th); Dynamo M. – Dnipro 6–2 (28th)

The 1991 Soviet Top League season (Russian: Чемпионат СССР по футболу 1991 (высшая лига)) was 22nd in the Top League and the 54th since the establishment of nationwide club competition, also the last one. Dynamo Kyiv were the defending 13-times champions and came fifth this season. A total of sixteen teams participated in the league, twelve of them have contested in the 1990 season while the remaining four were promoted from the Soviet First League due to withdrawals. The representatives of the Baltic states as well as Georgia chose not to take part in the competition.

The season began on 10 March and lasted until 2 November 1991. The season was won by PFC CSKA Moscow that returned to the top league prior to the last season while winning the Soviet Cup competition as well. The season's culmination occurred in its final rounds, when the army team managed to overtake Spartak, while with four rounds left in the season, Spartak was leading the table a point ahead of CSKA and a recent thrashing of Dynamo Moscow 7 to 1.

Due to participants withdrawal in the preceding season four new teams entered the league. Upon the conclusion of the season no clubs were relegated and 12 out of its 16 participants formed a base for either the Russian or the Ukrainian competitions, while other four participants joined their own newly formed national leagues. If the Soviet Union had remained intact, Metalist Kharkiv and Lokomotiv Moscow would have been relegated to the Soviet First League for the next season, while FC Rotor Volgograd and FC Tiligul Tiraspol would have been promoted to the Top League for 1992.

The top six clubs of the league later entered European competitions for their respective nations. The Ukrainian clubs chose to qualify through a separate national competition.

== Participating teams ==
The league was expanded to 16 after the last season, during which number of clubs left the Soviet competitions (from Georgia and Baltic states). The last-placed FC Rotor Volgograd of the 1990 Soviet Top League lost promotion/relegation playoff to Lokomotiv Moscow and was relegated to the 1991 Soviet First League. Rotor Volgograd returned to the Soviet First League after two seasons absence, while at the same time Lokomotiv Moscow returned to the Soviet Top League after only a one-season absence.

Beside the fourth placed Lokomotiv three more teams were promoted and included the champion (FC Spartak Vladikavkaz) and the runners-up of the 1990 Soviet First League (FC Pakhtakor Tashkent and FC Metalurh Zaporizhzhia).

- FC Spartak Vladikavkaz – champions (returning for the first time since 1970 after 20 seasons absence)
- FC Pakhtakor Tashkent – 2nd place (returning after six seasons)
- FC Metalurh Zaporizhzhia – 3rd place (debut)
- FC Lokomotiv Moscow – promotion play-off (returning after a season)

=== Locations ===
Location of teams in the 1991 Soviet Top League.

=== Stadiums ===
| Stadium | Team | Opened | Capacity | Notes |
|---|---|---|---|---|
| Republican Stadium, Kyiv | Dynamo Kyiv | 1923 | 100,062 | |
| Olympic Stadium Luzhniki, Moscow | Spartak Moscow | 1956 | 81,000 | |
| Olympic Stadium Luzhniki, Moscow | CSKA | 1956 | 81,000 | |
| Central Stadium Dynamo, Moscow | Dynamo Moscow | 1928 | 71,430 | |
| Central Stadium Hrazdan, Yerevan | Ararat | 1970 | 70,000 | |
| BSS Central Stadium, Odesa | Chornomorets | 1935 | 55,000 | |
| Central Stadium Pakhtakor, Tashkent | Pakhtakor | 1956 | 55,000 | |
| OSC Metalist, Kharkiv | Metalist | 1926 | 42,000 | |
| Dinamo Stadium, Minsk | Dinamo Minsk | 1934 | 40,000 | |
| Meteor Stadium, Dnipropetrovsk | Dnipro | 1966 | 40,000 | |
| Republican Stadium Spartak, Vladikavkaz | Spartak Vladikavkaz | 1962 | 32,464 | |
| Central Stadium Shakhtar, Donetsk | Shakhtar | 1936 | 31,718 | |
| Central Stadium Lokomotiv, Moscow | Lokomotiv | 1966 | 30,000 | |
| SC Olimpiyskiy, Moscow | Dynamo Moscow | 1980 | 22,000 | used in round 2nd |
| Frunze Republican Stadium, Dushanbe | Pamir | 1946 | 21,400 | |
| Torpedo Stadium, Moscow | Torpedo | 1959 | 16,000 | |
| Torpedo Stadium, Moscow | CSKA | 1959 | 16,000 | used in round 29th |
| Abovyan City Stadium, Abovyan | Ararat | 1966 | 5,500 | used in rounds 19th, 22nd, 23rd |
| LFK CSKA, Moscow | CSKA | 1979 | 4,000 | used in rounds 1st, 3rd, 5th, 6th |
| LFK CSKA, Moscow | Spartak Moscow | 1979 | 4,000 | used in round 3rd |
| LFK CSKA, Moscow | Dynamo Moscow | 1979 | 4,000 | used in rounds 1st, 5th, 6th |
| LFK CSKA, Moscow | Lokomotiv | 1979 | 4,000 | used in round 4th |
| Central Stadium Metalurh, Zaporizhzhia | Metalurh | 1938 | ? | |

== Managers ==
| Club | Head coach |
|---|---|
| PFC CSKA Moscow | Pavel Sadyrin |
| FC Spartak Moscow | Oleg Romantsev |
| FC Torpedo Moscow | Valentin Ivanov (until September); Yevgeni Skomorokhov (from September) |
| FC Chornomorets Odesa | Viktor Prokopenko |
| FC Dynamo Kyiv | Anatoliy Puzach |
| FC Dynamo Moscow | Semen Altman (until March); Valery Gazzaev (from April) |
| FC Dinamo Minsk | Eduard Malofeyev (until April); Mikhail Vergeyenko (from April) |
| FC Ararat Yerevan | Armen Sarkisyan |
| FC Dnipro Dnipropetrovsk | Yevhen Kucherevskyi |
| FC Pamir Dushanbe | Sharif Nazarov |
| FC Spartak Vladikavkaz | Valery Gazzaev (until March); Nikolai Khudiyev (April to July); Ruslan Khadartsev (from July) |
| FC Shakhtar Donetsk | Valeriy Yaremchenko |
| FC Metalurh Zaporizhzhia | Ihor Nadein |
| FC Pakhtakor Tashkent | Fyodor Novikov (until June); Ahrol Inoyatov (from July to October); Alexander Tarkhanov (from November) |
| FC Metalist Kharkiv | Leonid Tkachenko |
| FC Lokomotiv Moscow | Valeri Filatov |

== Final standings ==
| Pos | Team | Pld | W | D | L | GF | GA | GD | Pts | Qualification |
|---|---|---|---|---|---|---|---|---|---|---|
| 1 | (Russian Soviet Federative Socialist Republic) CSKA Moscow (C) | 30 | 17 | 9 | 4 | 57 | 32 | +25 | 43 | Qualification for Champions League first round |
| 2 | (Russian Soviet Federative Socialist Republic) Spartak Moscow | 30 | 17 | 7 | 6 | 57 | 30 | +27 | 41 | Qualification for Cup Winners' Cup first round |
| 3 | (Russian Soviet Federative Socialist Republic) Torpedo Moscow | 30 | 13 | 10 | 7 | 36 | 20 | +16 | 36 | Qualification for UEFA Cup first round |
| 4 | (Ukrainian Soviet Socialist Republic) Chornomorets | 30 | 10 | 16 | 4 | 39 | 24 | +15 | 36 | Withdrew from the league |
| 5 | (Ukrainian Soviet Socialist Republic) Dynamo Kyiv | 30 | 13 | 9 | 8 | 43 | 34 | +9 | 35 | Withdrew from the league |
| 6 | (Russian Soviet Federative Socialist Republic) Dynamo Moscow | 30 | 12 | 7 | 11 | 43 | 42 | +1 | 31 | Qualification for UEFA Cup first round |
| 7 | (Armenian Soviet Socialist Republic) Ararat | 30 | 11 | 7 | 12 | 29 | 36 | −7 | 29 | Withdrew from the league |
| 8 | (Byelorussian Soviet Socialist Republic) Dinamo Minsk | 30 | 9 | 11 | 10 | 29 | 31 | −2 | 29 | |
| 9 | (Ukrainian Soviet Socialist Republic) Dnipro | 30 | 9 | 10 | 11 | 31 | 36 | −5 | 28 | Withdrew from the league |
| 10 | (Tajik Soviet Socialist Republic) Pamir Dushanbe | 30 | 7 | 13 | 10 | 28 | 32 | −4 | 27 | |
| 11 | (Russian Soviet Federative Socialist Republic) Spartak Vladikavkaz | 30 | 9 | 8 | 13 | 33 | 41 | −8 | 26 | |
| 12 | (Ukrainian Soviet Socialist Republic) Shakhtar Donetsk | 30 | 6 | 14 | 10 | 33 | 41 | −8 | 26 | Withdrew from the league |
| 13 | (Ukrainian Soviet Socialist Republic) Metalurh Zaporizhzhia | 30 | 9 | 7 | 14 | 27 | 38 | −11 | 25 (Note: Metallurg received more head-to-head points against Pakhtakor.) | Withdrew from the league |
| 14 | (Uzbek Soviet Socialist Republic) Pakhtakor Tashkent | 30 | 9 | 7 | 14 | 37 | 45 | −8 | 25 | |
| 15 | (Ukrainian Soviet Socialist Republic) Metalist Kharkiv (Note: Metallist placed last in total wins tie-breaker to Metallurg and Pakhtakor.) | 30 | 8 | 9 | 13 | 32 | 43 | −11 | 25 | Withdrew from the league |
| 16 | (Russian Soviet Federative Socialist Republic) Lokomotiv Moscow | 30 | 5 | 8 | 17 | 18 | 47 | −29 | 18 | Avoided relegation |

Source: footbook.ru footballfacts.ru
Rules for classification: 1) Total points (If two or more teams have equal points for the first place, the winner is determined by additional single round-robin play-off on condition and place determined by the Federation); 2) Total wins; 3) Head-to-head results (3.1. points 3.2. goal difference 3.3. goal scored); 4) Total goal difference; 5) Total games scored; 6) Draw lots
(C) Champions
Notes:
- Immediately following this season, initially only Ukrainian-based teams officially informed the Football Federation of the Soviet Union about their withdrawal and participation in own national competitions. Just before organization of the next season, the Football Federation of the Soviet Union discovered that Armenian Ararat has no intentions to continue its participation either.

== Results ==
| Home \ Away | ARA | CHO | CSK | DNE | DYK | DMN | DMO | LOK | MKH | MZA | PAK | PAM | SHA | SPA | SPV | TOR |
|---|---|---|---|---|---|---|---|---|---|---|---|---|---|---|---|---|
| Ararat Yerevan | | 0–0 | 0–1 | 1–0 | 1–1 | 1–0 | 1–1 | 1–0 | 2–1 | 2–0 | 2–1 | 2–1 | 2–1 | 2–1 | 2–0 | 0–0 |
| Chornomorets Odesa | 5–0 | | 1–1 | 0–0 | 0–1 | 1–1 | 3–0 | 1–0 | 0–0 | 3–0 | 2–0 | 1–0 | 1–1 | 1–1 | 1–3 | 2–1 |
| CSKA Moscow | 2–1 | 4–3 | | 1–0 | 0–0 | 3–1 | 1–0 | 5–1 | 4–0 | 4–0 | 3–1 | 2–1 | 3–4 | 0–1 | 2–1 | 3–1 |
| Dnipro | 1–0 | 1–1 | 2–2 | | 1–1 | 1–1 | 1–0 | 2–0 | 3–0 | 1–0 | 1–3 | 1–2 | 3–1 | 0–2 | 1–1 | 0–0 |
| Dynamo Kyiv | 4–3 | 0–1 | 2–2 | 2–0 | | 3–1 | 2–1 | 2–0 | 1–1 | 1–0 | 3–3 | 2–0 | 0–0 | 2–3 | 2–1 | 1–3 |
| Dinamo Minsk | 0–0 | 0–0 | 0–1 | 4–1 | 2–2 | | 1–0 | 1–0 | 0–0 | 2–0 | 2–1 | 2–2 | 3–0 | 1–0 | 0–1 | 0–0 |
| Dynamo Moscow | 1–0 | 1–1 | 1–2 | 6–2 | 1–0 | 1–1 | | 6–1 | 2–1 | 1–1 | 3–1 | 0–0 | 1–1 | 1–1 | 3–1 | 1–4 |
| Lokomotiv Moscow | 0–0 | 0–0 | 1–3 | 0–2 | 1–2 | 2–0 | 1–0 | | 0–0 | 2–0 | 2–1 | 2–0 | 0–0 | 0–2 | 1–2 | 0–2 |
| Metalist Kharkiv | 0–1 | 3–1 | 3–2 | 1–1 | 0–2 | 0–0 | 0–1 | 3–1 | | 3–1 | 3–1 | 0–0 | 2–2 | 1–3 | 2–0 | 0–2 |
| Metalurh Zaporizhzhia | 1–1 | 1–4 | 0–0 | 3–2 | 2–1 | 2–1 | 2–0 | 3–0 | 0–1 | | 3–0 | 2–0 | 0–0 | 2–1 | 2–0 | 0–0 |
| Pakhtakor Tashkent | 3–1 | 0–0 | 0–0 | 1–2 | 2–0 | 1–1 | 1–2 | 1–0 | 4–2 | 0–0 | | 2–2 | 4–1 | 1–0 | 2–0 | 1–1 |
| Pamir Dushanbe | 2–1 | 1–1 | 2–2 | 0–0 | 2–1 | 2–1 | 2–1 | 0–0 | 2–2 | 3–0 | 0–1 | | 0–0 | 2–2 | 2–0 | 0–0 |
| Shakhtar Donetsk | 2–0 | 2–2 | 1–1 | 0–1 | 1–2 | 2–0 | 2–3 | 0–0 | 2–3 | 1–0 | 2–1 | 0–0 | | 1–1 | 2–0 | 2–2 |
| Spartak Moscow | 3–2 | 1–1 | 2–0 | 1–0 | 0–2 | 4–0 | 7–1 | 1–1 | 2–0 | 2–1 | 4–0 | 1–0 | 3–1 | | 2–1 | 1–2 |
| Spartak Vladikavkaz | 2–0 | 1–2 | 1–1 | 1–1 | 1–1 | 0–2 | 1–2 | 2–2 | 1–0 | 2–1 | 2–0 | 2–0 | 1–1 | 3–3 | | 1–0 |
| Torpedo Moscow | 2–0 | 0–0 | 1–2 | 1–0 | 1–0 | 0–1 | 0–2 | 5–0 | 2–0 | 0–0 | 1–0 | 1–0 | 2–0 | 1–2 | 1–1 | |

Legend: Blue = home team win; Yellow = draw; Red = away team win.

== Number of teams by union republic ==
| Rank | Union republic | Number of teams | Club(s) |
|---|---|---|---|
| 1 | RSFSR | 6 | CSKA Moscow, Dynamo Moscow, Lokomotiv Moscow, Spartak Moscow, Spartak Vladikavkaz, Torpedo Moscow |
| 1 | Ukrainian SSR | 6 | Chornomorets Odesa, Dynamo Kyiv, Dnipro Dnipropetrovsk, Metalist Kharkiv, Metalurh Zaporizhzhia, Shakhtar Donetsk |
| 3 | Armenian SSR | 1 | Ararat Yerevan |
| 3 | Belarusian SSR | 1 | Dinamo Minsk |
| 3 | Tajik SSR | 1 | Pamir Dushanbe |
| 3 | Uzbek SSR | 1 | Pakhtakor Tashkent |

== Top scorers ==
18 goals

- Igor Kolyvanov (Dynamo Moscow)

14 goals

- Oleg Salenko (Dynamo Kyiv)
- Igor Shkvyrin (Pakhtakor)

13 goals

- Aleksandr Mostovoi (Spartak Moscow)
- Dmitri Radchenko (Spartak Moscow)
- Nazim Suleymanov (Spartak Vladikavkaz)

12 goals

- Dmitri Kuznetsov (CSKA Moscow)

10 goals

- Igor Korneev (CSKA Moscow)
- Andrei Piatnitski (Pakhtakor)

9 goals

- Andrei Kobelev (Dynamo Moscow)
- Viktor Leonenko (Dynamo Moscow)
- Oleg Sergeyev (CSKA Moscow)
- Valeri Velichko (Dinamo Minsk)

== Clean sheets ==
14 matches

- Viktor Hryshko (Chornomorets Odesa)

11 matches

- Yuri Kurbyko (Dinamo Minsk)

10 matches

- Valeri Sarychev (Torpedo Moscow)
- Valeriy Horodov (Dnipro Dnipropetrovsk)
- Andriy Kovtun (Shakhtar Donetsk)

9 matches

- Stanislav Cherchesov (Spartak Moscow)
- Ihor Kutepov (Dynamo Kyiv)

8 matches

- Aleksandr Podshivalov (Torpedo Moscow)
- Andrei Manannikov (Pamir Dushanbe)

== Awards ==
| Prize | Founder | Laureate |
|---|---|---|
| Footballer of the Year | Football weekly | Igor Kolyvanov |
| Goalkeeper of the Year | Ogoniok magazine | Valeri Sarychev |
| Top Scorer | newspaper Labor | Igor Kolyvanov |
| Knight of Attack | Soviet Warrior magazine | Igor Kolyvanov |
| Top Rookie | Sport Games magazine | Valeriy Velichko |
| With Two Squads | Football Federation | Spartak Moscow |
| Grigory Fedotov Memorial | CSKA Moscow | Spartak Moscow |
| Fair Play | Person and Law magazine | Chornomorets Odesa |
| Large Score | Football weekly | Chornomorets Odesa |
| Will to Win | newspaper Sovetskaya Rossiya | Pamir Dushanbe |
| Best Difference of Aggregates | Start magazine | Spartak Moscow |
| Aggressive Visitor | newspaper Komsomol's Banner | CSKA Moscow |
| Danger of the Best | Sport Moscow weekly | Chornomorets Odesa |
| Progress Cup | newspaper Labor Newspaper | Chornomrets Odesa |
| First Height | newspaper Socialist Industry | CSKA Moscow |

== Medal squads ==
(league appearances and goals listed in brackets)

1. PFC CSKA Moscow

Goalkeepers: Mikhail Yeremin (15 / -14), Dmitri Kharine (11 / -8), Aleksandr Guteyev (6 / -10).
Defenders: Sergei Kolotovkin (25 / 1), Sergei Fokin (25 / 1), Dmitri Galiamin (21 / 2), Dmitri Bystrov (21), Oleg Malyukov (19), Vasili Ivanov (15), Valeri Minko (8), Viktor Yanushevsky (8), Mikhail Sinyov (1).
Midfielders: Valeri Broshin (30 / 4), Dmitri Kuznetsov (29 / 12), Igor Korneev (29 / 10), Mikhail Kolesnikov (28 / 2), Vladimir Tatarchuk (24 / 5), Aleksandr Grishin (5), Dmitri Karsakov (1), Lev Matveyev (1).
Forwards: Oleg Sergeyev (30 / 9), Valeri Masalitin (18 / 7), Sergey Dmitriev (16 / 4), Ilshat Faizulin (3).

Manager: Pavel Sadyrin.

Transferred in during the season: Dmitri Kharine (from Dynamo Moscow), Lev Matveyev (from Zvezda Perm), Sergey Dmitriev (from (Spain) Xerez CD), Viktor Yanushevsky (from (Germany) Tennis Borussia).

Transferred out during the season: Mikhail Yeremin (deceased), Dmitri Karsakov (to FC KAMAZ Naberezhnye Chelny), Dmitri Galiamin, Dmitri Kuznetsov, Igor Korneev (all to (Spain) Espanyol), Vladimir Tatarchuk (to (Czech Republic) Slavia Prague), Valeri Broshin (to (Finland) Kuopion Palloseura), Sergei Fokin (to (Finland) HJK Helsinki), Sergey Dmitriev (to (Austria) Stahl Linz).

2. FC Spartak Moscow

Goalkeepers: Stanislav Cherchesov (30 / -30).
Defenders: Dmitri Popov (30 / 5), Vasili Kulkov (22 / 1), Andrei Mokh (20 / 1), Dmitri Khlestov (14), Boris Pozdnyakov (10), Yevgeni Bushmanov (8 / 1), Dmitri Ananko (7), Dmitri Gradilenko (6), Sergei Bazulev (4), Sergei Chudin (1).
Midfielders: Hennadiy Perepadenko (28 / 5), Valery Karpin (28 / 3), Aleksandr Mostovoi (27 / 13), Andrei Ivanov (23), Igor Shalimov (22 / 5), Fyodor Cherenkov (22 / 3), Oleg Ivanov (14), Valeri Popovitch (6), Igor Kozlov (2), Oleg Imrekov (1), Aleksandr Karatayev (1), Serhiy Perepadenko (1).
Forwards: Dmitri Radchenko (29 / 13), Valeri Shmarov (19 / 6).

One own goal scored by Viktor Vasilyev (FC Spartak Vladikavkaz).

Manager: Oleg Romantsev.

Transferred in during the season: Andrei Mokh (from Dynamo Moscow), Dmitri Radchenko (from Zenit Leningrad), Igor Kozlov (from CSKA Moscow), Fyodor Cherenkov (from (France) Red Star).

Transferred out during the season: Igor Shalimov (to (Italy) Foggia), Vasili Kulkov, Aleksandr Mostovoi (both to (Portugal) Benfica), Valeri Shmarov (to (Germany) Karlsruher SC), Boris Pozdnyakov, Oleg Imrekov (both to (Austria) FC Stahl Linz), Sergei Bazulev (to (Finland) OLS), Andrei Mokh (to (Spain) Espanyol), Hennadiy Perepadenko (to (Israel) Hapoel Tzafririm).

3. FC Torpedo Moscow

Goalkeepers: Valeri Sarychev (17 / -12), Aleksandr Podshivalov (14 / -8).
Defenders: Andrei Afanasyev (27 / 1), Aleksei Yushkov (24 / 5), Aleksandr Polukarov (19 / 1), Mikhail Solovyov (17), Maksim Cheltsov (5).
Midfielders: Gennadi Grishin (29 / 7), Igor Chugainov (28 / 2), Sergei Shustikov (28 / 1), Sergey Agashkov (26 / 3), Andrei Kalaychev (23 / 2), Nikolai Savichev (21 / 3), Dmitri Ulyanov (16 / 1), Sergei Zhukov (9), Oleg Shirinbekov (8 / 1), Sergey Borisov (7), Vladimir Yeryomin (3), Aleksei Arefyev (1).
Forwards: Yuri Tishkov (24 / 8), Vadim Rogovskoy (14), Yuri Matveyev (12 / 1), Aleksandr Kuzmichyov (6), Andrei Talalayev (5), Aleksandr Gitselov (3).

Manager: Valentin Ivanov (until September), Yevgeni Skomorokhov (from September).

Transferred in during the season: Aleksandr Podshivalov (from Ararat Yerevan), Aleksei Yushkov, Yuri Matveyev (both from Uralmash Sverdlovsk), Igor Chugainov (from Lokomotiv Moscow), Vladimir Yeryomin (from Chornomorets Odesa).

Transferred out during the season: Aleksandr Polukarov (to (Israel) Maccabi Tel Aviv F.C.), Vadim Rogovskoy (free agent), Oleg Shirinbekov (to (Hungary) Vasas SC), Vladimir Yeryomin (to FC Metalurh Zaporizhzhia), Aleksei Yushkov (to Dynamo Moscow), Aleksandr Gitselov (to (Poland) Zagłębie Lubin), Sergei Zhukov, Aleksei Arefyev (both to (Bangladesh) Abahani Dhaka), Yuri Matveyev (to Uralmash Yekaterinburg), Aleksandr Kuzmichyov (to Lokomotiv Moscow).

== See also ==
- 1991 Soviet First League
- 1991 Soviet Second League
- 1991 Soviet Second League B
- 1990–91 Soviet Cup
- 1991–92 Soviet Cup

== Attendances ==
| No. | Club | Average |
|---|---|---|
| 1 | Spartak Vladikavkaz | 25,767 |
| 2 | Paxtakor | 17,247 |
| 3 | Metalurh Zaporizhzhya | 15,240 |
| 4 | Pamir | 15,200 |
| 5 | Spartak Moscow | 14,853 |
| 6 | Shakhtar Donetsk | 13,647 |
| 7 | Chornomorets | 12,800 |
| 8 | Dynamo Kyiv | 11,820 |
| 9 | PFC CSKA | 11,553 |
| 10 | Dinamo Minsk | 11,173 |
| 11 | Dnipro | 7,967 |
| 12 | Dynamo Moscow | 7,627 |
| 13 | Metalist | 6,553 |
| 14 | Lokomotiv Moscow | 4,040 |
| 15 | Torpedo Moscow | 3,967 |
| 16 | Ararat | 3,373 |
