= 1990 Soviet Top League =

53rd season of top-tier football league in Soviet Union

Soviet Top League
- Season: 1990
- Dates: March 1 — October 20, 1990
- Champions: Dynamo Kyiv (13th season)
- European Cup: Dynamo Kyiv
- Cup Winners' Cup: CSKA Moscow
- UEFA Cup: Dynamo Moscow; Torpedo Moscow; Spartak Moscow
- Top goalscorer: (12) Oleh Protasov (Dynamo Kyiv); Valeri Shmarov (Spartak Moscow)
- Biggest home win: CSKA – Rotor 7–0
- Biggest away win: Chornomorets – Dynamo K. 0–3
- Highest scoring: Spartak – CSKA 5–4

The 1990 Soviet Top League season was the 53rd since its establishment. Spartak Moscow were the defending 12-times champions, but came only fifth this season and marginally qualified for continental competitions. The league was shortened and a total of fourteen teams participated. By the start of the season both Georgian teams had withdrawn followed by another withdrawal from Žalgiris at the start of competition. The league consisted of ten teams contested in the 1989 season and the Army club promoted from the Soviet First League. The representatives of the Baltic states as well as Georgia chose not to take part in the competition.

The season began on 1 March with the game between Dnipro and Rotor and lasted until 20 October 1990. The season was won by FC Dynamo Kyiv.

== Participating teams ==
The league was reduced to 13 after first Georgian clubs (Dinamo Tbilisi and Guria Lanchkhuti) and then Žalgiris withdrew from the Soviet Top League.

Lokomotiv Moscow and the last placed Zenit Leningrad of the 1989 Soviet Top League were relegated to the 1990 Soviet First League. Lokomotiv returned to the Soviet First League after two seasons absence, while Zenit was relegated for the first time since being promoted back in 1938 through the club's merger.

Originally two teams were promoted from the 1989 Soviet First League and included PFC CSKA Moscow and FC Guria Lanchkhuti. Just before the start of new season Georgian clubs and Žalgiris left the league.

=== Promoted teams ===
- PFC CSKA Moscow – champion (returning after two seasons)
- FC Guria Lanchkhuti – 2nd place (returning after two seasons)

=== Withdrawn teams ===
- FC Guria Lanchkhuti, joined the Georgian Top League (Umaglesi Liga)
- FC Dinamo Tbilisi, joined the Georgian Top League (Umaglesi Liga)
- FC Zalgiris Vilnius, joined the 1990 Baltic League

=== Locations ===
Location of teams in the 1990 Soviet Top League.

=== Stadiums ===
Stadium	Team	Opened	Capacity	Notes
Republican Stadium, Kyiv	Dynamo Kyiv	1923	100,062	
Olimpic Stadium Luzhniki, Moscow	Spartak	1956	81,000	
Olimpic Stadium Luzhniki, Moscow	CSKA	1956	81,000	
Central Stadium Dinamo, Moscow	Dinamo Moscow	1928	71,430	
Central Stadium Hrazdan, Yerevan	Ararat	1970	70,000	
BSS Central Stadium, Odesa	Chornomorets	1935	55,000	
OSC Metalist, Kharkiv	Metalist	1926	42,000	
Dinamo Stadium, Minsk	Dinamo Minsk	1934	40,000	
Meteor Stadium, Dnipropetrovsk	Dnipro	1966	40,000	
Central Stadium, Volgograd	Rotor	1962	40,000	
Central Stadium Shakhtar, Donetsk	Shakhtar	1936	31,718	
SC Olimpiyskiy, Moscow	Spartak	1980	22,000	used in round 3rd, 4th, 7th, 9th
Frunze Republican Stadium, Dushanbe	Pamir	1946	21,400	
Torpedo Stadium, Moscow	Torpedo	1959	16,000	
LFK CSKA, Moscow	CSKA	1979	4,000	used in rounds 1st, 2nd, 5th, 10th
LFK CSKA, Moscow	Dinamo Moscow	1979	4,000	used in rounds 1st, 2nd, 5th

== Managers ==
Club	Head coach
FC Dynamo Kyiv	Anatoliy Puzach
PFC CSKA Moscow	Pavel Sadyrin
FC Dynamo Moscow	Semen Altman
FC Torpedo Moscow	Valentin Ivanov
FC Spartak Moscow	Oleg Romantsev
FC Dnipro Dnipropetrovsk	Yevhen Kucherevskyi
FC Ararat Yerevan	Armen Sarkisyan
FC Shakhtar Donetsk	Valeriy Yaremchenko
FC Chornomorets Odessa	Viktor Prokopenko
FC Pamir Dushanbe	Sharif Nazarov
FC Metalist Kharkiv	Leonid Tkachenko
FC Dinamo Minsk	Eduard Malofeyev
FC Rotor Volgograd	Vladimir Fayzulin
Žalgiris Vilnius	Benjaminas Zelkevičius

=== Managerial changes ===
Team	Outgoing manager	Manner of departure	Date of vacancy	Position in table	Incoming manager	Date of appointment
Rotor Volgograd	(Russian Soviet Federative Socialist Republic) Aleksandr Sevidov		31 May 1990		(Russian Soviet Federative Socialist Republic) Vladimir Fayzulin	1 June 1990
Dinamo Moscow	(Ukrainian Soviet Socialist Republic) Anatoliy Byshovets		31 July 1990		(Ukrainian Soviet Socialist Republic) Semen Altman	1 August 1990
Dinamo Kiev	(Ukrainian Soviet Socialist Republic) Valeriy Lobanovskyi		31 August 1990		(Ukrainian Soviet Socialist Republic) Anatoliy Puzach	1 September 1990

== Final standings ==
Pos	Team	Pld	W	D	L	GF	GA	GD	Pts	Qualification (Note: Guria and Dinamo Tbilisi never played any games in the league for the season and joined their national competition. Žalgiris joined the 1990 Baltic League which was a regional international competition.)
1	(Ukrainian Soviet Socialist Republic) Dynamo Kyiv (C)	24	14	6	4	44	20	+24	34	Qualification for European Cup first round
2	(Russian Soviet Federative Socialist Republic) CSKA Moscow	24	13	5	6	43	26	+17	31	Qualification for Cup Winners' Cup first round
3	(Russian Soviet Federative Socialist Republic) Dinamo Moscow	24	12	7	5	27	24	+3	31	Qualification for UEFA Cup first round
4	(Russian Soviet Federative Socialist Republic) Torpedo Moscow	24	13	4	7	28	24	+4	30	Qualification for UEFA Cup first round
5	(Russian Soviet Federative Socialist Republic) Spartak Moscow	24	12	5	7	39	26	+13	29	Qualification for UEFA Cup first round
6	(Ukrainian Soviet Socialist Republic) Dnipro Dnipropetrovsk	24	11	6	7	39	26	+13	28	
7	(Armenian Soviet Socialist Republic) Ararat Yerevan	24	8	7	9	25	23	+2	23	
8	(Ukrainian Soviet Socialist Republic) Shakhtar Donetsk	24	6	10	8	23	31	−8	22	
9	(Ukrainian Soviet Socialist Republic) Chornomorets Odesa	24	8	3	13	23	29	−6	19	
10	(Tajik Soviet Socialist Republic) Pamir Dushanbe	24	7	4	13	26	34	−8	18	
11	(Ukrainian Soviet Socialist Republic) Metalist Kharkiv	24	5	8	11	13	28	−15	18	
12	(Byelorussian Soviet Socialist Republic) Dinamo Minsk	24	6	3	15	20	34	−14	15	
13	(Russian Soviet Federative Socialist Republic) Rotor Volgograd (R)	24	4	6	14	14	39	−25	14	Qualification for Relegation play-off
14	(Lithuanian Soviet Socialist Republic) Žalgiris Vilnius (Note: Žalgiris Vilnius withdrew from the championship after losing to Chornomorets 1–0 in Odesa. Žalgiris' record was 0 wins, 0 draws and 1 loss with 0-1 goal difference and later was annulled. As Žalgiris withdrew, its European berth was transferred to Chornomorets.) (R)	0	0	0	~~1~~	0	0	0	0	Withdrew from the league

Rules for classification: 1) Total points (If two or more teams have equal points for the first place, the winner is determined by additional single round-robin play-off on condition and place determined by the Federation); 2) Total wins; 3) Head-to-head results (3.1. points 3.2. goal difference 3.3. goal scored); 4) Total goal difference; 5) Total games scored; 6) Draw lots
(C) Champions; (R) Relegated

=== Promotion/relegation play-off ===
(13th team of the Top League and 4th team of the First League)

Team 1	Agg.	Team 2	1st leg	2nd leg
Lokomotiv Moscow	3–2	Rotor Volgograd	3–1	0–1

1990-11-11

Lokomotiv Moscow	3 – 1	Rotor Volgograd
Samatov 12'; Rybakov 51'; Zhitkov 79'	Report	Fyodorovsky 76'

LFK CSKA, Moscow
Attendance: 2,000 (4,600)
Referee: Petro Kobychek (Chernivtsi)

1990-11-17

Rotor Volgograd	1 – 0	Lokomotiv Moscow
Polstyanov 1'	Report	Gallakberov (yellow card) ?' (yellow-red card) 89'

Central Stadium of Trade Unions, Volgograd
Attendance: 25,000
Referee: Vadim Zhuk (Minsk)

Lokomotiv Moscow won the promotion on 3–2 aggregate

== Results ==
Home \ Away	ARA	CHO	CSK	DNI	DMN	DYK	DYN	MKH	PAM	ROT	SHA	SPA	TOR
Ararat Yerevan		1–0	4–0	2–2	3–0	2–1	1–2	0–0	1–0	3–0	0–0	1–3	0–1
Chornomorets Odessa	1–0		0–0	1–0	3–1	0–3	2–3	1–0	3–1	0–0	4–2	1–0	0–1
CSKA Moscow	0–1	2–0		1–2	1–0	1–1	0–0	3–2	4–1	7–0	4–0	2–1	3–1
Dnipro	1–1	2–0	2–2		3–1	1–0	5–1	3–0	4–1	3–1	4–2	1–1	1–0
Dinamo Minsk	0–0	2–1	1–2	2–0		3–2	0–0	0–0	1–0	3–1	2–0	0–1	1–2
Dynamo Kyiv	1–0	2–1	4–1	2–1	3–0		0–1	2–0	3–1	3–0	2–0	3–1	4–3
Dynamo Moscow	1–2	3–2	0–0	1–0	1–0	0–0		1–0	2–1	1–1	2–0	1–1	1–2
Metalist Kharkiv	0–0	1–0	0–1	0–0	1–0	0–2	0–1		1–1	1–0	1–1	0–1	2–1
Pamir Dushanbe	3–2	0–0	0–2	2–3	3–1	1–1	2–0	1–0		1–0	2–1	5–1	0–1
Rotor Volgograd	0–0	0–2	0–1	2–1	2–0	0–0	0–1	1–2	1–0		3–2	0–2	2–2
Shakhtar Donetsk	1–0	1–0	1–0	0–0	1–0	2–2	1–1	2–2	0–0	3–0		0–0	2–1
Spartak Moscow	4–0	3–1	5–4	2–0	2–1	1–3	1–2	6–0	1–0	0–0	0–0		2–0
Torpedo Moscow	2–1	1–0	0–2	1–0	2–1	0–0	3–1	0–0	1–0	1–0	1–1	1–0	

Legend: Blue = home team win; Yellow = draw; Red = away team win.

== Top scorers ==
12 goals

- Oleg Protasov (Dynamo Kyiv)
- Valeri Shmarov (Spartak Moscow)

10 goals

- Eduard Son (Dnipro)

9 goals

- Mykola Kudrytsky (Dnipro)
- Aleksandr Mostovoi (Spartak Moscow)
- Mukhsin Mukhamadiev (Pamir)
- Sergei Yuran (Dynamo Kyiv)

8 goals

- Igor Korneev (CSKA Moscow)
- Valeri Masalitin (CSKA Moscow)
- Yuri Savichev (Torpedo Moscow)

== Clean sheets ==
Сухие матчи вратарей Чемпионат СССР 1990. Высшая лига - статистика игроков

11 matches

- Stanislav Cherchesov (Spartak Moscow)
- Aleksandr Podshivalov (Torpedo Moscow)

10 matches

- Valeri Sarychev (Torpedo Moscow)
- Aleksandr Uvarov (Dynamo Moscow)

9 matches

- Viktor Chanov (Dynamo Kyiv)

8 matches

- Viktor Hryshko (Chornomorets Odesa)

7 matches

- Mikhail Yeryomin (CSKA Moscow)
- Andriy Kovtun (Shakhtar Donetsk)

== Medal squads ==
(league appearances and goals listed in brackets)

1. FC Dynamo Kyiv

Goalkeepers: Viktor Chanov (21), Aleksandr Zhidkov (4).
Defenders: Serhiy Shmatovalenko (22 / 1), Oleh Kuznetsov (20 / 2), Akhrik Tsveiba (20), Serhiy Zayets (17 / 1), Anatoliy Demyanenko (15), Oleh Luzhnyi (12), Andriy Annenkov (8), Volodymyr Bezsonov (7 / 1), Andriy Bal (4), Borys Derkach (3 / 2), Andriy Aleksanenkov (3), Yuriy Moroz (3).
Midfielders: Hennadiy Lytovchenko (24 / 6), Vasyl Rats (21 / 2), Ivan Yaremchuk (18 / 2), Serhiy Kovalets (11 / 2), Oleksiy Mykhaylychenko (8), Pavlo Yakovenko (6).
Forwards: Oleg Salenko (21 / 4), Oleh Protasov (16 / 12), Sergei Yuran (13 / 9).

Manager: Valeriy Lobanovskyi (until September), Anatoliy Puzach (from September).

Transferred out during the season: Oleh Kuznetsov (to (Scotland) Rangers), Oleh Protasov (to (Greece) Olympiacos), Oleksiy Mykhaylychenko (to (Italy) Sampdoria).

2. PFC CSKA Moscow

Goalkeepers: Mikhail Yeremin (15), Aleksandr Guteyev (6), Yuri Shishkin (4).
Defenders: Dmitri Bystrov (23 / 1), Dmitri Galiamin (23), Sergei Fokin (21 / 1), Sergei Kolotovkin (20), Oleg Malyukov (16), Viktor Yanushevsky (12).
Midfielders: Valeri Broshin (24 / 5), Dmitri Kuznetsov (22 / 5), Igor Korneev (21 / 8), Vladimir Tatarchuk (21 / 3), Mikhail Kolesnikov (18 / 2), Igor Kozlov (8), Sergei Krutov (2), Aleksandr Grishin (1).
Forwards: Oleg Sergeyev (24 / 6), Sergey Dmitriev (21 / 4), Valeri Masalitin (9 / 8).

Manager: Pavel Sadyrin.

Transferred out during the season: none.

3. FC Dynamo Moscow

Goalkeepers: Aleksandr Uvarov (20), Andrei Smetanin (3), Dmitri Kharine (1).
Defenders: Andrei Chernyshov (22 / 2), Igor Sklyarov (21 / 1), Viktor Losev (20), Andrei Mokh (18 / 2), Yevgeni Smertin (18), Yevgeni Dolgov (16), Vyacheslav Tsaryov (10), Serhiy Protsyuk (9), Andrei Zhirov (2), Ravil Sabitov (2).
Midfielders: Aleksei Sereda (23), Andrey Kobelev (21 / 4), Sergei Derkach (19 / 4), Igor Dobrovolski (15 / 4), Roman Pylypchuk (15 / 2), Aleksandr Zakharov (4), Aleksandr Smirnov (3), Aleksei Yeryomenko (2), Sergei Neyman (1).
Forwards: Sergei Kiriakov (22 / 3), Igor Kolyvanov (19 / 5), Igor Simutenkov (1).

Manager: Anatoli Byshovets (until July), Semen Altman (caretaker, from July).

Transferred out during the season: Aleksandr Smirnov, Ravil Sabitov (both to FC Dinamo Sukhumi).

== Number of teams by union republic ==
Rank	Union republic	Number of teams	Club(s)
1	RSFSR	5	CSKA Moscow, Dinamo Moscow, Rotor Volgograd, Spartak Moscow, Torpedo Moscow
1	Ukrainian SSR	5	Chernomorets Odessa, Dinamo Kiev, Dnepr Dnepropetrovsk, Metallist Kharkov, Shakhter Donetsk
3	Armenian SSR	1	Ararat Yerevan
3	Belarusian SSR	1	Dinamo Minsk
3	Tajik SSR	1	Pamir Dushanbe
3	Lithuanian SSR	1	Zhalgiris Vilnius

== Attendances ==
No.	Club	Average
1	Spartak Moscow	27,800
2	Dynamo Kyiv	20,467
3	Rotor	20,167
4	Pamir	15,500
5	Chornomorets	14,492
6	Shakhtar Donetsk	14,250
7	Dnipro	12,083
8	Ararat	11,492
9	PFC CSKA	11,242
10	Metalist	10,375
11	Dynamo Moscow	9,233
12	Dinamo Minsk	8,342
13	Torpedo Moscow	4,908

== See also ==
- Soviet First League 1990
- 1990 Soviet Second League
- 1990 Soviet Second League B
- 1990 Baltic League
