= 1991 Soviet Cup final =

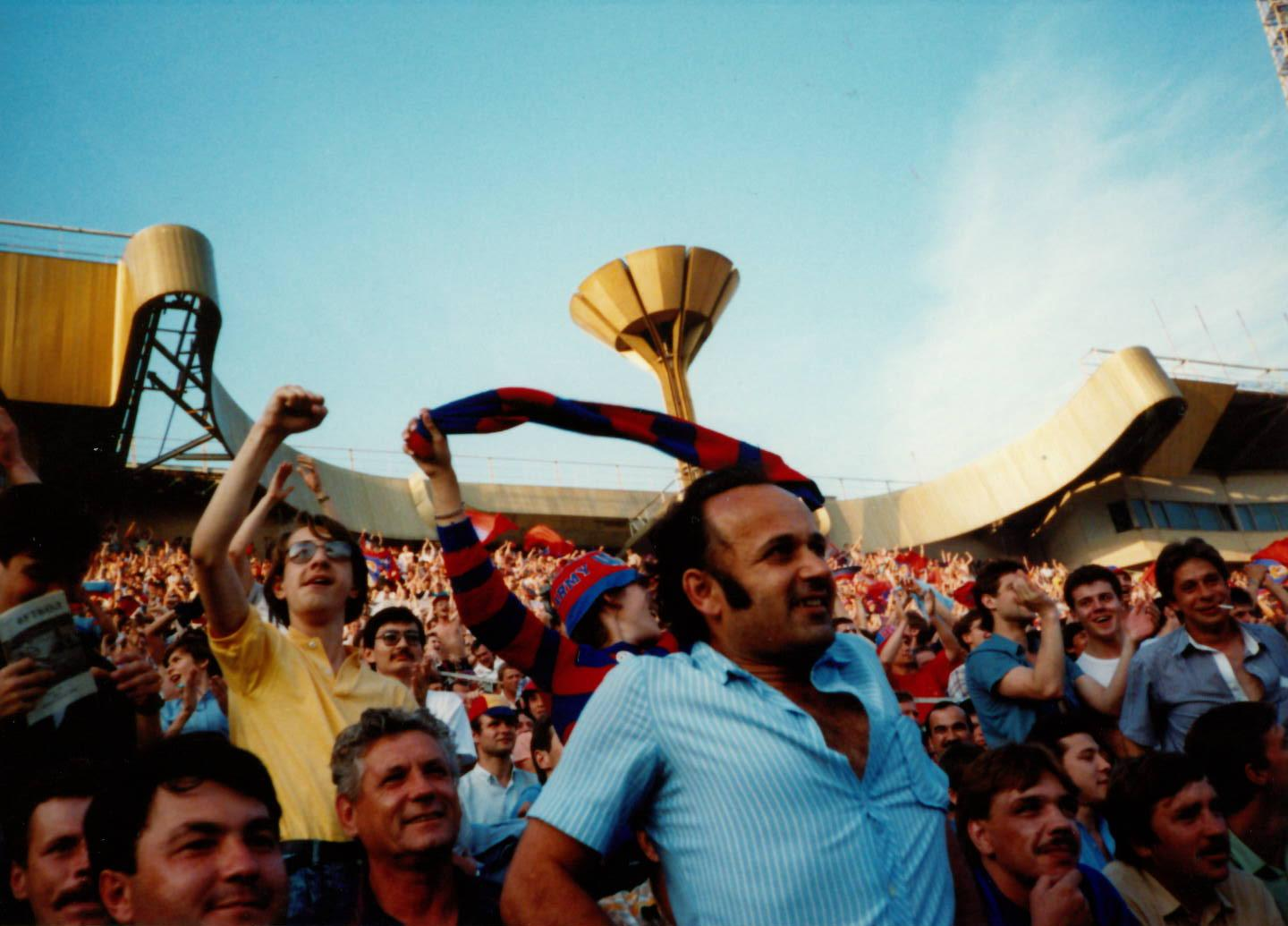
- Event: 1990–91 Soviet Cup
CSKA Moscow	Torpedo Moscow
3	2
- Date: 23 June 1991
- Venue: Lenin's Central Stadium, Moscow
- Referee: Valeriy Butenko (Moscow)
- Attendance: 37,000
- Weather: 27 °C

The 1991 Soviet Cup final was a football match that took place at the Lenin's Central Stadium, Moscow on 23 June 1991. The match was the jubilee 50th Soviet Cup Final and it was contested by PFC CSKA Moscow and FC Torpedo Moscow. The Soviet Cup winner CSKA qualified for the Cup Winners' Cup first round for the Soviet Union. CSKA played their 7th Cup Final winning on 5 occasions including this one. For Torpedo it was their 15th Cup Final and for the ninth time they were defeated at this stage.

This match was the final match played by CSKA and USSR national team goalkeeper Mikhail Yeriomin. Yeriomin was in a serious car accident the evening after the final and died at a hospital on 30 June 1991 from his injuries.

== Road to Moscow ==
All sixteen Soviet Top League clubs did not have to go through qualification to get into the competition, so CSKA and Torpedo both qualified for the competition automatically. The last year defending champions Dynamo Kyiv were eliminated administratively in the first round of the competition (1/16 final) by FC Tekstilshchik Kamyshin after winning their home game 7–1 (later changed to -:+).

CSKA Moscow
Round 1 (1st leg)	Neftianik F.	0–2	CSKA
Round 1 (2nd leg)	CSKA	3–1	Neftianik F.
	(CSKA won 5–1 on aggregate)		
Round 2 (1st leg)	CSKA	4–1	Dnipro
Round 2 (2nd leg)	Dnipro	2–2	CSKA
	(CSKA won 6–3 on aggregate)		
Quarter-final	CSKA	4–1	Dinamo Minsk
Semi-final	Lokomotiv Moscow	0–3	CSKA

Torpedo Moscow
Round 1 (1st leg)	Zenit	1–2	Torpedo
Round 1 (2nd leg)	Torpedo	2–0	Zenit
	(Torpedo won 4–1 on aggregate)		
Round 2 (1st leg)	Torpedo	2–0	Karpaty
Round 2 (2nd leg)	Karpaty	1–3	Torpedo
	(Torpedo won 5–1 on aggregate)		
Quarter-final	Torpedo	0–0 aet 3–1 pen.	Spartak
Semi-final	Torpedo	0–0 aet 7–6 pen.	Ararat

== Previous encounters ==
Previously these two teams met each other in the early editions of the competition on several occasions. However this was their first time and the last that they met in the finals of the Soviet Cup. Previously their contested each other four times in semifinals of this competition since 1944.

== Match summary ==
1991-06-23
?:? LST

CSKA Moscow	3 – 2	Torpedo Moscow
Igor Korneyev 45', 67'; Oleg Sergeyev 80'	Report	Yuriy Tishkov 43', 75'

Lenin's Central Stadium, Moscow
Attendance: 37,000
Referee: Valeriy Butenko (Moscow)

PFC CSKA Moscow
FC Torpedo Moscow

PFC CSKA Moscow:
GK	(Russian Soviet Federative Socialist Republic) Mikhail Yeriomin
DF	(Russian Soviet Federative Socialist Republic) Dmitriy Kuznetsov (c)
DF	(Russian Soviet Federative Socialist Republic) Sergei Kolotovkin
MF	(Russian Soviet Federative Socialist Republic) Dmitriy Bystrov
DF	(Russian Soviet Federative Socialist Republic) Sergey Fokin (substituted off) 70'
DF	(Russian Soviet Federative Socialist Republic) Mikhail Kolesnikov
MF	(Russian Soviet Federative Socialist Republic) Igor Korneyev
MF	(Russian Soviet Federative Socialist Republic) Valeriy Broshyn (substituted off) 83'
MF	(Russian Soviet Federative Socialist Republic) Oleg Sergeyev
FW	(Russian Soviet Federative Socialist Republic) Vladimir Tatarchuk
FW	(Russian Soviet Federative Socialist Republic) Valeriy Masalitin (substituted off) 72'
Substitutes:
FW	(Russian Soviet Federative Socialist Republic) Sergey Dmitriyev (substituted on) 70'
DF	(Russian Soviet Federative Socialist Republic) Oleg Malyukov (substituted on) 72'
MF	(Byelorussian Soviet Socialist Republic) Viktor Yanushevsky (substituted on) 83'
GK	(Soviet Union)
DF	(Soviet Union)
DF	(Soviet Union)
MF	(Soviet Union)
Manager:
(Russian Soviet Federative Socialist Republic) Pavel Sadyrin

FC Torpedo Moscow:
GK	(Tajik Soviet Socialist Republic) Valeriy Sarychev
DF	(Russian Soviet Federative Socialist Republic) Aleksandr Polukarov (c)
DF	(Russian Soviet Federative Socialist Republic) Andrey Kalaichev
MF	(Russian Soviet Federative Socialist Republic) Andrey Afanasyev (yellow card)
DF	(Russian Soviet Federative Socialist Republic) Aleksei Yushkov
DF	(Russian Soviet Federative Socialist Republic) Sergey Shustikov (substituted off) 70'
MF	(Russian Soviet Federative Socialist Republic) Igor Chugainov
MF	(Russian Soviet Federative Socialist Republic) Yuriy Tishkov
MF	(Russian Soviet Federative Socialist Republic) Nikolai Savichev (substituted off) 46'
FW	(Tajik Soviet Socialist Republic) Oleg Shyrinbekov
FW	(Russian Soviet Federative Socialist Republic) Sergey Agashkov
Substitutes:
FW	(Russian Soviet Federative Socialist Republic) Yuriy Matveyev (substituted on) 70'
DF	(Russian Soviet Federative Socialist Republic) Gennadiy Grishyn (substituted on) 46'
MF	(Soviet Union)
GK	(Soviet Union)
DF	(Soviet Union)
DF	(Soviet Union)
MF	(Soviet Union)
Manager:
(Russian Soviet Federative Socialist Republic) Valentin Ivanov

MATCH OFFICIALS

- Assistant referees:
  - Andrei Butenko (Moscow)
  - Anatoliy Maliarov (Moscow)
- Fourth official: ( )

MATCH RULES

- 90 minutes.
- 30 minutes of extra-time if necessary.
- Penalty shoot-out if scores still level.
- Seven named substitutes
- Maximum of 3 substitutions.

Soviet Cup 1991 winners
CSKA Moscow
Fifth title

== See also ==
- Soviet Top League 1990
