= 1991 FC Shakhtar Donetsk season =

Shakhtar Donetsk
1991 season
- Manager: Valeriy Yaremchenko
- Stadium: Shakhtar Stadium
- Top League: 12th place
- Soviet Cup: Round of 16 (1/8)
- Soviet Cup: Round of 16 (1/8)

The 1991 season was the last season in the top Soviet football league for Shakhtar Donetsk.

== Players ==
=== Main squad ===
Squad no.	Name	Nationality	Position	Date of birth (age)	Signed from	Signed in
Goalkeepers
	Andriy Kovtun	(Soviet Union)	GK	28 February 1968 (aged 23)	Dynamo Kyiv	1990
	Dmytro Shutkov	(Soviet Union)	GK	3 April 1972 (aged 19)	Academy	1989
	Volodymyr Vasyutyk	(Soviet Union)	GK	24 March 1970 (aged 21)	Zakarpattia Uzhhorod	1991
Defenders
	Stanislav Bondarev	(Soviet Union)	DF	29 June 1968 (aged 23)	SKA Rostov-na-Donu	1991
	Yevhen Drahunov	(Soviet Union)	DF	13 February 1964 (aged 27)	Kolos Pavlohrad	1985
	Oleksandr Martiuk	(Soviet Union)	DF	24 July 1972 (aged 19)	Bazhanovets Makiivka	1990
	Vasyl Mazur	(Soviet Union)	DF	23 May 1970 (aged 21)	Sports College Luhansk	1987
	Serhiy Onopko	(Soviet Union)	DF	26 October 1973 (aged 18)	Sports College Luhansk	1990
	Viktor Onopko	(Soviet Union)	DF	14 October 1969 (aged 22)	Dynamo Kyiv	1990
	Vasyl Yevseyev	(Soviet Union)	DF	30 August 1962 (aged 29)	Dynamo Kyiv	1988
Midfielders
	Oleksandr Barabash	(Soviet Union)	MF	18 January 1971 (aged 20)	Academy	1988
	Andrei Kanchelskis	(Soviet Union)	MF	23 January 1969 (aged 22)	Dynamo Kyiv	1990
	Ihor Korniyets	(Soviet Union)	MF	14 July 1967 (aged 24)	Metalurh Zaporizhia	1991
	Ihor Leonov	(Soviet Union)	MF	14 September 1967 (aged 24)	Tavriya Simferopol	1988
	Ihor Petrov	(Soviet Union)	MF	30 January 1964 (aged 27)	Shakhtar Horlivka	1981
	Mykhailo Stelmakh	(Soviet Union)	MF	29 April 1966 (aged 25)	Halychyna Drohobych	1991
	Ihor Stolovytskyi	(Soviet Union)	MF	29 August 1969 (aged 22)	Spartak Ryazan	1990
	Serhiy Yashchenko	(Soviet Union)	MF	25 June 1959 (aged 32)	CSKA Moscow	1982
Forwards
	Serhiy Atelkin	(Soviet Union)	FW	8 January 1972 (aged 19)	Antratsyt Kirovske academy	1989
	Aleksei Kobozyev	(Soviet Union)	FW	13 April 1967 (aged 24)	Dynamo Stavropol	1988
	Serhiy Pohodin	(Soviet Union)	FW	29 April 1968 (aged 23)	Zorya Luhansk	1990
	Serhii Rebrov	(Soviet Union)	FW	3 June 1974 (aged 17)	UOR Donetsk	1990
	Serhiy Scherbakov	(Soviet Union)	FW	15 August 1971 (aged 20)	Academy	1988

=== Reserve squad ===
Squad no.	Name	Nationality	Position	Date of birth (age)	Signed from	Signed in
Goalkeepers
	Oleksandr Kovalenko	(Soviet Union)	GK	17 August 1974 (aged 17)	—	1991
Defenders
	Mykola Chesnokov	(Soviet Union)	DF	17 November 1972 (aged 18)	Novator Mariupol	1991
	Oleksandr Dorokhov	(Soviet Union)	DF	27 January 1969 (aged 22)	—	1991
	Oleh Ivanov	(Soviet Union)	DF	7 June 1966 (aged 25)	—	1991
	Oleksandr Koval	(Soviet Union)	DF	3 May 1974 (aged 17)	Academy	1991
	Vadym Krasnikov	(Soviet Union)	DF	21 January 1969 (aged 22)	Antratsyt Kirovske	1991
	Andriy Kuptsov	(Soviet Union)	DF	23 January 1971 (aged 20)	Kryvbas Kryvyi Rih	1989
	Andrei Kvashnev	(Soviet Union)	DF	19 September 1974 (aged 17)	UOR Donetsk	1991
	Oleksandr Malevanov	(Soviet Union)	DF	13 February 1974 (aged 17)	UOR Donetsk	1991
	Serhiy Mazur	(Soviet Union)	DF	23 May 1970 (aged 21)	Sports College Luhansk	1987
	Oleh Muravyov	(Soviet Union)	DF	27 June 1971 (aged 20)	Novator Mariupol	1991
	Sergei Rastegayev	(Soviet Union)	DF	29 January 1972 (aged 19)	Vuhlyk Krasnoarmiysk	1990
	Sergei Zainulin	(Soviet Union)	DF	5 October 1974 (aged 17)	—	1991
Midfielders
	Valeriy Kryventsov	(Soviet Union)	MF	31 July 1973 (aged 18)	Antratsyt Kirovske	1991
	Hennadiy Orbu	(Soviet Union)	MF	23 July 1970 (aged 21)	Vuhlyk Makiivka	1991
	Oleksandr Stolyarov	(Soviet Union)	MF	7 August 1973 (aged 18)	—	1990
	Rais Terkulov	(Soviet Union)	MF	1 June 1972 (aged 19)	—	1991
	Eduard Tsykhmeystruk	(Soviet Union)	MF	24 June 1973 (aged 18)	Shakhtar Makiivka academy	1989
	Spartak Zhyhulin	(Soviet Union)	MF	25 May 1971 (aged 20)	—	1989
Forwards
	Viktor Khursa	(Soviet Union)	FW	7 May 1973 (aged 18)	Novator Mariupol	1991
	Andriy Popandopulo	(Soviet Union)	FW	10 May 1972 (aged 19)	Novator Mariupol	1991

== Transfers ==
=== In ===
Date	Pos.	Player	Moving from	Fee	Source

=== Out ===
Date	Pos.	Player	Moving to	Fee	Source

== Competitions ==
=== Overall ===
Competition	First match	Last match	Starting round	Final position	Record							
Competition	First match	Last match	Starting round	Final position	Pld	W	D	L	GF	GA	GD	Win %
Vysshaya Liga	10 March 1991	2 November 1991	Matchday 1	12th	30	6	14	10	33	41	−8	20.00
Cup 91	22 May 1990	17 November 1990	Round of 32 (1/16)	Round of 16 (1/8)	4	2	1	1	6	5	+1	50.00
Cup 92	4 September 1991	25 November 1991	Round of 32 (1/16)	Round of 16 (1/8)	4	2	1	1	3	3	+0	50.00
Total					38	10	16	12	42	49	−7	26.32

Source: Competitions
