= Vladimir Yeryomin =

Vladimir Yeryomin may refer to:

- Vladimir Yeryomin (footballer)
- Vladimir Yeryomin (actor)
