= 1989 Soviet First League =

Soviet First League
- Season: 1989
- Champions: CSKA Moscow
- Promoted: CSKA Moscow
- Relegated: SKA Rostov-on-Don; Daugava Riga; SKA Karpaty Lviv
- Top goalscorer: (32) Valeriy Masalitin (CSKA Moscow)

The 1989 Soviet First League was the 50th season of the second-tier round-robin competitions of association football in the Soviet Union.

== Teams ==
=== Promoted teams ===
- FC Fakel Voronezh – Winner of the Second League finals (returning after an absence of a season)
- FC Nistru Chișinău – Winner of the Second League finals (returning after an absence of 2 seasons)
- FC Torpedo Kutaisi – Winner of the Second League finals (returning after an absence of a season)

=== Relegated teams ===
- FC Kairat Almaty – (Returning after 5 seasons)
- FC Neftchi Baku – (Returning after 13 seasons)

=== Locations ===
Location of teams in the 1989 Soviet First League.

== League standings ==
Pos	Team	Pld	W	D	L	GF	GA	GD	Pts	Promotion or relegation
1	(Russian Soviet Federative Socialist Republic) CSKA Moscow (C, P)	42	27	10	5	113	28	+85	64	Promotion to Top League
2	(Georgian Soviet Socialist Republic) Guria Lanchkhuti (X)	42	27	9	6	78	39	+39	63	Withdrew from the league
3	(Kazakh Soviet Socialist Republic) Kairat Almaty	42	23	9	10	75	39	+36	55	
4	(Russian Soviet Federative Socialist Republic) Dynamo Stavropol	42	19	12	11	57	46	+11	50	
5	(Russian Soviet Federative Socialist Republic) Fakel Voronezh	42	19	11	12	54	36	+18	49	
6	(Ukrainian Soviet Socialist Republic) Tavriya Simferopol	42	18	12	12	61	50	+11	48	
7	(Ukrainian Soviet Socialist Republic) Metalurh Zaporizhzhia	42	17	12	13	55	40	+15	46	
8	(Azerbaijan Soviet Socialist Republic) Neftchi Baku	42	17	12	13	58	48	+10	46	
9	(Armenian Soviet Socialist Republic) Kotayk Abovyan	42	15	14	13	47	40	+7	44	
10	(Moldavian Soviet Socialist Republic) Nistru Chișinău	42	19	5	18	45	59	−14	43	
11	(Russian Soviet Federative Socialist Republic) Geolog Tyumen	42	17	9	16	50	49	+1	43	
12	(Uzbek Soviet Socialist Republic) Pakhtakor Tashkent	42	16	11	15	59	44	+15	43	
13	(Georgian Soviet Socialist Republic) Torpedo Kutaisi (X)	42	18	5	19	69	73	−4	41	Withdrew from the league
14	(Russian Soviet Federative Socialist Republic) Rostselmash Rostov-on-Don	42	12	14	16	38	46	−8	38	
15	(Russian Soviet Federative Socialist Republic) Kuzbass Kemerevo	42	12	12	18	29	41	−12	36	
16	(Russian Soviet Federative Socialist Republic) Shinnik Yaroslavl	42	11	14	17	44	62	−18	36	
17	(Russian Soviet Federative Socialist Republic) Spartak Ordjonikidze	42	12	11	19	44	61	−17	35	
18	(Georgian Soviet Socialist Republic) Dinamo Batumi (X)	42	11	13	18	39	61	−22	35	Withdrew from the league
19	(Russian Soviet Federative Socialist Republic) Kuban Krasnodar	42	12	10	20	43	78	−35	34	
20	(Russian Soviet Federative Socialist Republic) SKA Rostov-on-Don (R)	42	10	12	20	53	76	−23	32	Relegation to Second League
21	(Latvian Soviet Socialist Republic) Daugava Riga (R)	42	9	8	25	32	74	−42	26	Relegation to Second League
22	(Ukrainian Soviet Socialist Republic) SKA Karpaty Lviv (R)	42	5	7	30	37	90	−53	17	Relegation to Second League

Source: RSSSF
(C) Champions; (P) Promoted; (R) Relegated; (X) Quit the Football Federation of the Soviet Union after this season and joined the leagues of the native country.

== Top scorers ==
#	Player	Club	Goals
1	Valeriy Masalitin	CSKA Moscow	32
2	Merab Megreladze	Torpedo Kutaisi	29
3	Aleksandr Gaydash	Tavriya Simferopol	27
4	Seiran Osipov	Dynamo Stavropol	25
4	Merab Zhordania	Guria Lanchkhuti	25
6	Gia Guruli	Guria Lanchkhuti	18
7	Vitaliy Papadopulo	SKA Rostov-on-Don	17
8	Vali Gasimov	Neftchi Baku	16
8	Oleh Taran	Metalurh Zaporizhia	16

== Number of teams by union republic ==
Rank	Union republic	Number of teams	Club(s)
1	RSFSR	10	CSKA Moscow, Dinamo Stavropol, Fakel Voronezh, Geolog Tyumen, Rostselmash Rostov-na-Donu, Kuzbass Kemerovo, Shinnik Yaroslavl, Spartak Vladikavkaz, Kuban Krasnodar, SKA Rostov-na-Donu
2	Georgian SSR	3	Guria Lanchkhuti, Torpedo Kutaisi, Dinamo Batumi
2	Ukrainian SSR	3	Metallurg Zaporozhye, Tavriya Simferopol, SKA Karpaty Lvov
4	Moldavian SSR	1	Nistru Kishenev
4	Armenian SSR	1	Kotaik Abovian
4	Uzbek SSR	1	Pakhtakor Tashkent
4	Azerbaijan SSR	1	Neftchi Baku
4	Kazakh SSR	1	Kairat Alma-Ata
4	Latvian SSR	1	Daugava Riga

== See also ==
- Soviet First League
