= Bodak =

Bodak may refer to

- Bodak (surname)
- Bodak (Dungeons & Dragons), a monster in table-top game Dungeons & Dragons
- Bodak Yellow, a single by the American rapper Cardi B
