= Bodak (surname) =

Bodak is the surname of the following notable people:

- Bob Bodak (born 1961), Canadian ice hockey player
- Chuck Bodak (1916–2009), American boxing cutman and trainer
- Joanna Bodak (born 1974), Polish rhythmic gymnast
- Martin Bodák (born 1998), Slovak ice hockey defenceman
- Peter Bodak (born 1961), English football winger
- Sergei Bodak (born 1964), Russian football player

== See also ==
- Leonard Bodack (1932–2015), American politician
