= Guri Shin clan =

Korean clan from Gyeonggi Province

- Country: Korea
- Current region: Guri
- Founder: Valeri Sarychev

Guri Shin clan (Korean: 구리 신씨; Hanja: 九里 申氏) is one of the Korean clans. Their Bon-gwan was in Guri, Gyeonggi Province. Their founder is Valeri Sarychev, a soccer player and instructor. He was a Russian-Korean from Tajik Soviet Socialist Republic which was one of the republics in the Soviet Union. He acquired Korean citizenship in the year 2000.

== See also ==
- Korean clan names of foreign origin
