= Yuri Shishkin =

Russian footballer

Personal information
- Full name: Yuri Nikolayevich Shishkin
- Date of birth: 9 January 1963 (age 63)
- Place of birth: Voronezh, Russian SFSR
- Height: 1.87 m (6 ft 1 1/2 in)
- Position: Goalkeeper

Team information
- Current team: FC Spartak Moscow (GK coach)

Senior career*
Years	Team	Apps	(Gls)
1980	FC Fakel Voronezh	0	(0)
1981–1991	PFC CSKA Moscow	117	(0)
1992	Rio Branco	7	(0)
1993	FC Okean Nakhodka	28	(0)
1994	FC KAMAZ Naberezhnye Chelny	2	(0)
1995	Chunnam Dragons	12	(0)
1996–1998	FC Krylia Sovetov Samara	81	(0)
1999	FC Fakel Voronezh	21	(0)
2000	FC Spartak-Chukotka Moscow	8	(0)
2002	FK Ventspils	1	(0)
2003–2004	FC Krylia Sovetov Samara	0	(0)

Managerial career
- 2001–2002: FK Ventspils (GK coach)
- 2003–2006: FC Krylia Sovetov Samara (assistant)
- 2007: FC Krylia Sovetov Samara (GK coach)
- 2007: FC Saturn Ramenskoye (GK coach)
- 2008: FC Saturn Ramenskoye (reserves GK coach)
- 2009–2010: FC Saturn Ramenskoye (GK coach)
- 2011: FC Metalurh Donetsk (GK coach)
- 2013–2020: FC Krylia Sovetov Samara (GK coach)
- 2020–2023: FC Kuban Krasnodar (GK coach)
- 2023–: FC Spartak Moscow (GK coach)
- * Club domestic league appearances and goals

Yuri Nikolayevich Shishkin (Russian: Юрий Николаевич Шишкин; born 9 January 1963) is a Russian professional football coach and a former player. He is the goalkeepers coach with FC Spartak Moscow.

== Club career ==
He made his professional debut in the Soviet Top League in 1982 for PFC CSKA Moscow. After that, he signed for Rio Branco.

== Honours ==
- Soviet Top League runner-up: 1990.
- Latvian Higher League runner-up: 2002.
