= Vadim Rogovskoy =

Russian footballer

Personal information
- Full name: Vadim Nikolayevich Rogovskoy
- Date of birth: 6 February 1962 (age 64)
- Place of birth: Kursk, Russian SFSR
- Height: 1.88 m (6 ft 2 in)
- Position: Defender

Senior career*
Years	Team	Apps	(Gls)
1980–1981	Avangard Kursk	39	(9)
1982	Iskra Smolensk	0	(0)
1983	Obuvschik Lida		
1984–1987	Avangard Kursk	122	(15)
1988–1991	Torpedo Moscow	89	(0)
1991–1995	Zagłębie Lubin	126	(2)
1996–1997	GKS Bełchatów	43	(0)
1997–2001	LKS Jankowy		
2001–2003	Omega Kleszczów		
2005–2007	Świt Kamieńsk		
2007–2008	Hetman Rusiec		
- * Club domestic league appearances and goals

Vadim Nikolayevich Rogovskoy (Russian: Вадим Николаевич Роговской; born 6 February 1962) is a Russian former professional footballer who played as a defender.
