= Borys Derkach =

Soviet and Ukrainian footballer (1964–2019)

Personal information
- Full name: Borys Yuriyovych Derkach
- Date of birth: 14 January 1964
- Place of birth: Kharkiv, Ukrainian SSR
- Date of death: 18 May 2019 (aged 55)
- Place of death: Kharkiv, Ukraine
- Height: 1.75 m (5 ft 9 in)
- Position: Defender

Senior career*
Years	Team	Apps	(Gls)
1981–1982	FC Metalist Kharkiv	0	(0)
1983	FC Mayak Kharkiv		
1984	FC Metalist Kharkiv	1	(0)
1984–1985	SKA Kyiv	48	(8)
1986	PFC CSKA Moscow	14	(1)
1986–1989	FC Metalist Kharkiv	55	(6)
1990–1991	FC Dynamo Kyiv	23	(5)
1991	Levski Sofia	0	(0)
1992	Bursaspor	5	(0)
1992	FC Evis Mykolaiv	29	(1)
1993	Nyíregyháza Spartacus	4	(0)
- * Club domestic league appearances and goals

Borys Yuriyovych Derkach (Ukrainian: Борис Юрійович Деркач; 14 January 1964 – May 2019) was a Soviet and Ukrainian professional football player.

From 1992 to 2005 he was in a Hungarian jail, with an original sentence of 11 years for an assault on a Hungarian pimp and two Ukrainian prostitutes. Later the sentence was increased for an escape attempt. He also played during the season 1991–92 with Bulgarian side PFC Levski Sofia, but made no appearances in the league, just one in the Bulgarian Cup.

== Honours ==
- Soviet Top League champion: 1990.
- Soviet Cup winner: 1988, 1990.
- USSR Federation Cup finalist: 1987, 1989.
- 1988–89 European Cup Winners' Cup with FC Metalist Kharkiv: 3 games.
- 1990–91 European Cup Winners' Cup with FC Dynamo Kyiv: 5 games.
- 1991–92 European Cup with FC Dynamo Kyiv: 1 game.
