= Sergei Bodak =

Russian footballer

Personal information
- Full name: Sergei Stepanovich Bodak
- Date of birth: 9 April 1964 (age 62)
- Place of birth: Moscow, Russia
- Height: 1.80 m (5 ft 11 in)
- Position: Defender

Youth career
- FC Dynamo Moscow

Senior career*
| Years | Team | Apps | (Gls) |
| 1982 | FC Dynamo Moscow | 0 | (0) |
| 1982–1984 | FC Dynamo Kashira | 49 | (1) |
| 1986 | FC Znamya Truda Orekhovo-Zuyevo | 11 | (0) |
| 1987–1988 | FC Torpedo Moscow | 19 | (0) |
| 1989–1990 | FC Lokomotiv Moscow | 39 | (0) |
| 1991 | FC Sakhalin Yuzhno-Sakhalinsk | 18 | (1) |
| 1991–1992 | FC Krylia Sovetov Samara | 24 | (0) |
| 1992 | FC Spartak Vladikavkaz | 7 | (0) |
| 1993 | FC Viktor-Avangard Kolomna | 17 | (2) |
| 1995–1999 | FC Saturn Ramenskoye | 116 | (2) |

Managerial career
- 2001–2003: FC Saturn-RenTV Ramenskoye (administrator)
- 2005–2006: FC Saturn Moscow Oblast (administrator)
- * Club domestic league appearances and goals

Sergei Stepanovich Bodak (Russian: Серге́й Степанович Бодак; born 9 April 1964) is a former Russian professional footballer.

== Club career ==
He made his professional debut in the Soviet Second League in 1982 for FC Dynamo Kashira.

On 5 July 1993, he committed a foul on Yuri Tishkov in a Russian Cup game which caused a horrific injury to Tishkov (Tishkov never fully recovered). Bodak was banned from football for life, but the ban was lifted a year later.

== Honours ==
- Soviet Top League bronze: 1988.
- Soviet Cup finalist: 1988, 1989, 1990.
- Russian Premier League runner-up: 1992.
