= Sergei Fokin (footballer) =

Russian footballer (born 1961)

Personal information
- Full name: Sergei Aleksandrovich Fokin
- Date of birth: 26 July 1961 (age 65)
- Place of birth: Ulyanovsk, USSR
- Height: 1.82 m (6 ft 0 in)
- Position: Defender

Senior career*
Years	Team	Apps	(Gls)
1978–1983	Alga Frunze		
1984–1992	PFC CSKA Moscow	226	(15)
1992–2000	Eintracht Braunschweig	170	(2)

International career
1986–1988	USSR (Olympic)	4	(0)
1989–1990	USSR	3	(0)
Medal record
Representing Soviet Union
Men's Football
Gold medal – first place	1988 Seoul	Team competition
- * Club domestic league appearances and goals

Sergei Aleksandrovich Fokin (Russian: Сергей Александрович Фокин; born 26 July 1961 in Ulyanovsk) is a former Russian footballer. He was famous during the days he played for CSKA Moscow for scoring numerous own goals, including 1990 league game against FC Spartak Moscow and European cup games against A.S. Roma and Rangers F.C.

== International career ==
He earned three caps for USSR from 1989 to 1990, and was included in the squad for the 1990 FIFA World Cup. He also won a gold medal in the 1988 Olympics.

== Honours ==
- Olympic champion: 1988
- Soviet Top League winner: 1991
- Soviet Cup winner: 1991
