= Valeri Sarychev =

Tajik South Korean footballer (born 1960)

Valeri Sarychev Shin Eui-son
Personal information
- Full name: Valeri Konstantinovich Sarychev; Shin Eui-son
- Date of birth: 12 January 1960 (age 66)
- Place of birth: Dushanbe, Tajik SSR
- Height: 1.92 m (6 ft 4 in)
- Position: Goalkeeper

Senior career*
Years	Team	Apps	(Gls)
1978–1981	Pamir Dushanbe	93	(0)
1981	CSKA Moscow	4	(0)
1982–1991	Torpedo Moscow	161	(0)
1992–1998	Ilhwa Chunma	157	(0)
2000–2004	Anyang LG Cheetahs	95	(0)
Total		510	(0)

International career
1997	Tajikistan	1	(0)
- * Club domestic league appearances and goals

- Valeri Sarychev
- Hangul: 신의손
- Hanja: 申宜孫
- RR: Sin Uison
- MR: Sin Ŭison

Valeri Konstantinovich Sarychev (Russian: Валерий Константинович Сарычев; born 12 January 1960), also known as Shin Eui-son (Korean: 신의손), is a former Tajikistani footballer who played as a goalkeeper. He is regarded as one of the greatest K League goalkeepers of all time. In 2000, he gained South Korean nationality.

== Club career ==
Sarychev started his senior career in Pamir Dushanbe, the Soviet second division club. He spent his heyday in Torpedo Moscow and reached the Soviet Cup final five times with Torpedo. He received the Lev Yashin Prize in 1991, but he left for South Korea the next year after the dissolution of the Soviet Union. He played for Seongnam Ilhwa Chunma and Anyang LG Cheetahs in South Korea's K League. Since 1999, the K League Federation made a new regulation which bans the use of foreign goalkeepers because the other clubs excessively employed foreign goalkeepers after watching his performances. He became a naturalized South Korean in 2000 and named his Korean name "Shin Eui-son" which is his nickname and means the "Hand of God". He had a retirement ceremony on 1 May 2005 and became a goalkeeper coach after retirement. He won one Asian Club Championship and four K Leagues in South Korea and was selected as the goalkeeper of the K League 30th Anniversary Best XI in 2013.

== International career ==
In August 1997, the Tajikistani national team were to take 16 players to South Korea to face their national team, but due to missing passports, only 12 players traveled. As a result, the Tajikistan Football Federation called upon Sarychev, as well as Vitaliy Parakhnevych who were playing in the K League.

== Personal life ==
He acquired Korean citizenship in the year 2000, after being encouraged to do so by Cho Kwang-rae, the then manager of FC Anyang (currently Executive Director of Daegu FC). He is married to Olga Sarycheva and has a daughter and a son. Shin neither drinks nor smokes, and his only hobby is listening to music. He has a collection of 700 LP records at home, including complete collections of the Beatles and Genesis albums.

After acquiring Korean citizenship he founded the Guri Shin clan.

== Career statistics ==
=== Club ===
Appearances and goals by club, season and competition
Club	Season	League			National cup		League cup		Continental		Other		Total	
Club	Season	Division	Apps	Goals	Apps	Goals	Apps	Goals	Apps	Goals	Apps	Goals	Apps	Goals
Pamir Dushanbe	1978	Soviet First League	14	0	1	0	—		—		—		15	0
Pamir Dushanbe	1979	Soviet First League	18	0	0	0	—		—		—		18	0
Pamir Dushanbe	1980	Soviet First League	38	0	2	0	—		—		—		40	0
Pamir Dushanbe	1981	Soviet First League	23	0	1	0	—		—		—		24	0
Pamir Dushanbe	Total		93	0	4	0	—		—		—		97	0
CSKA Moscow	1981	Soviet Top League	4	0	0	0	—		—		—		4	0
Torpedo Moscow	1982	Soviet Top League	1	0	0	0	—		—		—		1	0
Torpedo Moscow	1983	Soviet Top League	2	0	0	0	—		—		—		2	0
Torpedo Moscow	1984	Soviet Top League	26	0	2	0	—		—		—		28	0
Torpedo Moscow	1985	Soviet Top League	26	0	2	0	—		—		—		28	0
Torpedo Moscow	1986	Soviet Top League	6	0	4	0	3	0	0	0	—		13	0
Torpedo Moscow	1987	Soviet Top League	3	0	0	0	5	0	—		0	0	8	0
Torpedo Moscow	1988	Soviet Top League	26	0	6	0	4	0	1	0	—		37	0
Torpedo Moscow	1989	Soviet Top League	30	0	6	0	4	0	4	0	—		44	0
Torpedo Moscow	1990	Soviet Top League	24	0	6	0	—		6	0	—		36	0
Torpedo Moscow	1991	Soviet Top League	17	0	4	0	—		3	0	—		24	0
Torpedo Moscow	Total		161	0	30	0	16	0	14	0	0	0	221	0
Ilhwa Chunma	1992	K League	30	0	—		10	0	—		—		40	0
Ilhwa Chunma	1993	K League	30	0	—		5	0	—		—		35	0
Ilhwa Chunma	1994	K League	30	0	—		6	0			—		36	0
Ilhwa Chunma	1995	K League	27	0	—		7	0			—		34	0
Ilhwa Chunma	1996	K League	26	0	1	0	1	0			—		28	0
Ilhwa Chunma	1997	K League	9	0	0	0	7	0			—		16	0
Ilhwa Chunma	1998	K League	5	0	0	0	0	0	—		—		5	0
Ilhwa Chunma	Total		157	0	1	0	36	0			—		194	0
Anyang LG Cheetahs
Anyang LG Cheetahs	2000	K League	24	0	0	0	8	0			—		32	0
Anyang LG Cheetahs	2001	K League	27	0	2	0	8	0			1 (Note: Appearance in Korean Super Cup)	0	38	0
Anyang LG Cheetahs	2002	K League	26	0	0	0	9	0			—		35	0
Anyang LG Cheetahs	2003	K League	18	0	1	0	—		—		—		19	0
Anyang LG Cheetahs	2004	K League	0	0	0	0	7	0	—		—		7	0
Anyang LG Cheetahs	Total		95	0	3	0	32	0			1	0	131	0
Career total			510	0	38	0	84	0	14	0	1	0	647	0

=== International ===
Appearances and goals by national team and year
National team	Year	Apps	Goals
Tajikistan	1997	1	0

== Honours ==
Torpedo Moscow

- Soviet Cup: 1985–86

Ilhwa Chunma

- K League 1: 1993, 1994, 1995
- Korean League Cup: 1992
- Asian Club Championship: 1995
- Asian Super Cup: 1996
- Afro-Asian Club Championship: 1996

Anyang LG Cheetahs

- K League 1: 2000
- Korean Super Cup: 2001
- Asian Club Championship runner-up: 2001–02

Individual

- Ogoniok Goalkeeper of the Year (Lev Yashin Prize): 1991
- K League All-Star: 1992, 1995, 1997, 2000, 2001, 2002
- K League 1 Best Defender/Goalkeeper: 1992, 1994
- K League 1 Best XI: 1992, 1993, 1994, 1995, 2000, 2001
- K League 30th Anniversary Best XI: 2013
