= Aleksandr Zakharov (footballer, born 1969) =

Soviet and Russian footballer

Aleksandr Zakharov Александр Захаров
Personal information
- Full name: Aleksandr Viktorovich Zakharov
- Date of birth: 11 August 1969 (age 57)
- Place of birth: Kursk, Russian SFSR
- Height: 1.78 m (5 ft 10 in)
- Position: Midfielder

Youth career
- 1988–1989: Iskra Smolensk

Senior career*
| Years | Team | Apps | (Gls) |
| 1989 | Iskra Smolensk | 34 | (3) |
| 1990–1991 | Dynamo Moscow | 21 | (0) |
| 1991–1997 | Dnipro Dnipropetrovsk | 122 | (9) |
| 1997–1998 | Kryvbas Kryvyi Rih | 2 | (0) |
| 1997 | Hapoel Be'er Sheva | 4 | (0) |
| 1998 | Dnipro Dnipropetrovsk | 4 | (0) |
| 1998 | → Dnipro-2 Dnipropetrovsk | 6 | (0) |
| 1999 | Kristall Smolensk | 2 | (0) |
| 1999 | Torpedo-MAZ Minsk | 4 | (0) |
| 2001–2003 | Torpedo Zaporizhia | 14 | (0) |
- * Club domestic league appearances and goals

Aleksandr Viktorovich Zakharov (Russian: Александр Викторович Захаров; born 11 August 1969) is a former Soviet and Russian professional footballer.

== Club career ==
He made his debut in the Soviet Top League in 1990 for FC Dynamo Moscow.

== Honours ==
- Soviet Top League bronze: 1990.
- Ukrainian Premier League silver: 1993.
- Ukrainian Premier League bronze: 1992.
