= Viktor Yanushevsky =

Belarusian footballer (1960–1992)

Personal information
- Full name: Viktor Frantsevich Yanushevsky
- Date of birth: 23 January 1960
- Place of birth: Minsk, Belarusian SSR
- Date of death: 23 June 1992 (aged 32)
- Place of death: Berlin, Germany
- Height: 1.84 m (6 ft 0 in)
- Position: Defender

Youth career
- SDYuShOR Minsk

Senior career*
Years	Team	Apps	(Gls)
1977–1988	Dinamo Minsk	259	(3)
1989–1990	CSKA Moscow	31	(1)
1990–1991	Aldershot	6	(1)
1991	CSKA Moscow	8	(0)
1991–1992	Tennis Borussia Berlin	11	(1)

International career
1978	Soviet Union U18		
1979	Soviet Union U20		
1983–1984	Soviet Union Olympic	3	(0)
1984	Soviet Union	2	(0)
- * Club domestic league appearances and goals

Viktor Frantsevich Yanushevsky (Russian: Виктор Францевич Янушевский; 23 January 1960 – 23 June 1992) was a Soviet and Belarusian professional footballer who played as a defender. He died during a training session of a heart attack.

== International career ==
Yanushevsky made his debut for USSR on 28 March 1984 in a friendly against West Germany.

== Honours ==
Dinamo Minsk

- Soviet Top League: 1982

CSKA Moscow

- Soviet Top League: 1991
- Soviet Cup: 1990–91

Soviet Union

- UEFA European Under-18 Football Championship: 1978
