= Sergei Bazulev =

Russian footballer

Personal information
- Full name: Sergei Vasilyevich Bazulev
- Date of birth: 10 October 1957 (age 69)
- Place of birth: Lyubertsy, Russian SFSR
- Height: 1.82 m (6 ft 0 in)
- Position: Defender

Senior career*
Years	Team	Apps	(Gls)
1978	FC Spartak Kostroma	1	(0)
1979	FC Krasnaya Presnya Moscow	33	(0)
1980–1982	FC Dynamo Kirov	98	(5)
1983–1984	FC Spartak Moscow	46	(0)
1985	Neftchi Baku PFC	26	(0)
1986–1988	FC Lokomotiv Moscow	106	(0)
1989–1991	FC Spartak Moscow	44	(0)
1991	Oulun Luistinseura	18	(3)
1992	FC Oulu	0	(0)
- * Club domestic league appearances and goals

Sergei Vasilyevich Bazulev (Russian: Серге́й Васильевич Базулев; born 10 October 1957) is a former Russian professional footballer.

== Honours ==
- Soviet Top League champion: 1989.
- Soviet Top League runner-up: 1983, 1984, 1991.

== European club competitions ==
With FC Spartak Moscow.

- UEFA Cup 1989–90: 3 games.
- European Cup 1990–91: 8 games.
