= Pavel Sadyrin =

Soviet footballer

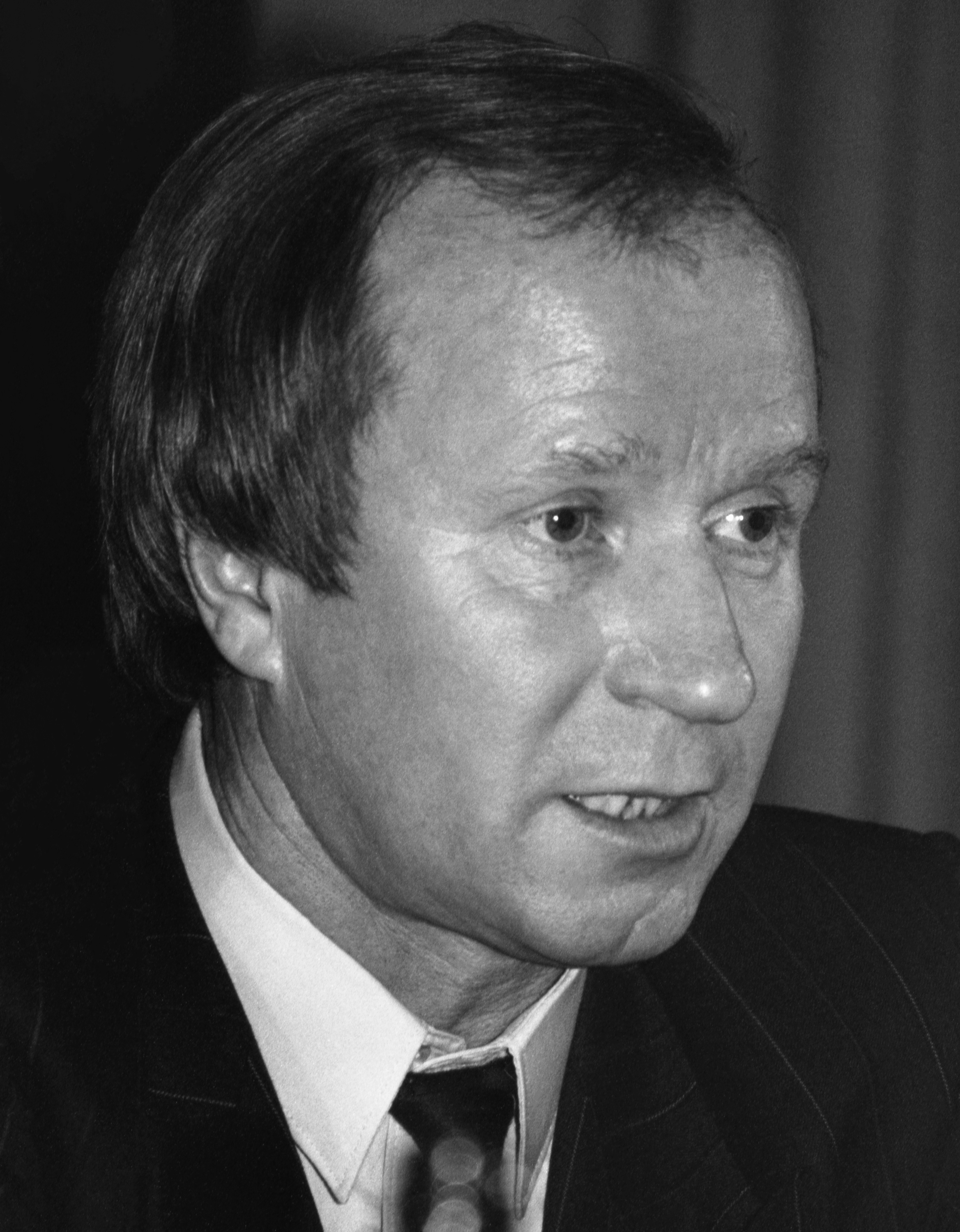
- Sadyrin in 1991

Personal information
- Full name: Pavel Fyodorovich Sadyrin
- Date of birth: 18 September 1942
- Place of birth: Molotov, Soviet Union
- Date of death: 1 December 2001 (aged 59)
- Place of death: Moscow, Russia
- Height: 1.73 m (5 ft 8 in)
- Position: Midfielder

Youth career
- 1956–1959: Zvezda Perm

Senior career*
Years	Team	Apps	(Gls)
1959–1964	Zvezda Perm	29	(5)
1965–1975	Zenit Leningrad	333	(37)

Managerial career
- 1978–1982: Zenit Leningrad (assistant)
- 1983–1987: Zenit Leningrad
- 1988: FC Kristall Kherson
- 1989–1992: CSKA Moscow
- 1992–1994: Russia
- 1995–1996: Zenit Saint Petersburg
- 1997–1998: CSKA Moscow
- 1998–1999: Rubin Kazan
- 2000: Uzbekistan
- 2000–2001: CSKA Moscow
- * Club domestic league appearances and goals

Pavel Fyodorovich Sadyrin (Russian: Павел Фёдорович Садырин; 18 September 1942 – 1 December 2001) was a Soviet and Russian footballer and manager.

== Career ==
Sadyrin played as a midfielder for Zvezda Perm and Zenit Leningrad.

As a manager, he led Zenit to their only Soviet championship in 1984. In 1991, he won the cup and the last Soviet title with CSKA Moscow. Sadyrin also won promotions to the top flight with CSKA (in 1989) and Zenit (in 1995).

Sadyrin was the manager of Russia national team in 1992-1994 and led Russia at the 1994 FIFA World Cup.

Pavel Sadyrin was also known for his participation in several emergency rescue operations.

In 2001, he died of cancer.

== Honours ==
Zenit Leningrad

- Soviet Top League: 1984
- Soviet Super Cup: 1985

CSKA Moscow

- Soviet Top League: 1991
- Soviet Cup: 1991
