= Aleksandr Podshivalov =

Russian footballer (born 1964)

Aleksandr Podshivalov Александр Подшивалов
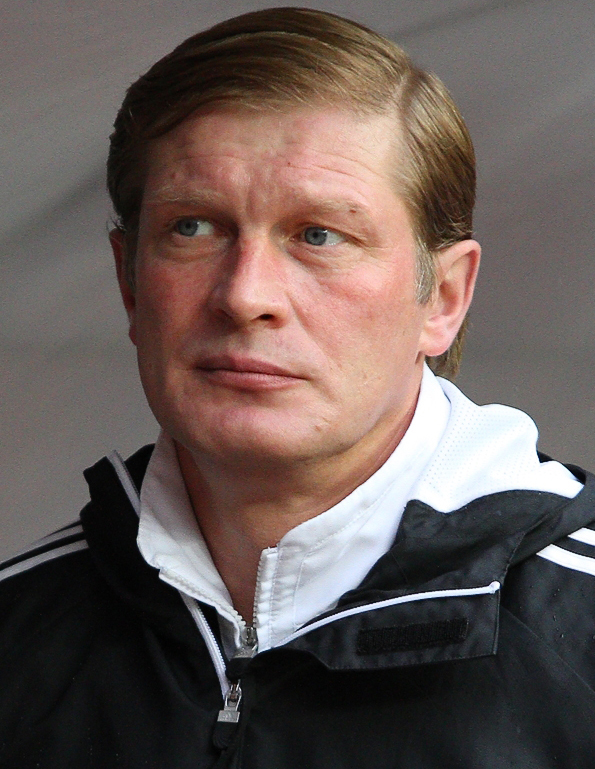

Personal information
- Full name: Aleksandr Viktorovich Podshivalov
- Date of birth: 6 September 1964 (age 62)
- Place of birth: Sverdlovsk, Russian SFSR
- Height: 1.90 m (6 ft 3 in)
- Position: Goalkeeper

Team information
- Current team: FC Volgar Astrakhan (GK coach)

Senior career*
Years	Team	Apps	(Gls)
1980–1983	Uralmash Yekaterinburg	28	(0)
1984–1990	FC Ararat Yerevan	169	(0)
1991–1993	FC Torpedo Moscow	75	(0)
1993–1994	Hapoel Haifa F.C.	30	(0)
1994–1997	Yukong Elephants / Bucheon SK	63	(0)
1997	FC Lokomotiv Moscow	5	(0)
1997–1998	FC Serpukhov		
2008	FC Senezh Solnechnogorsk		

International career
1993	Russia	1	(0)

Managerial career
- 1999–2000: SDYuShOR Torpedo-ZIL Moscow (GK coach)
- 2001: FC Torpedo-ZIL Moscow (GK coach)
- 2009–2012: FC Tom Tomsk (GK coach)
- 2013: Russia U17 (GK coach)
- 2014–2018: FC Tom Tomsk (GK coach)
- 2020–2021: FC Tom Tomsk (GK coach)
- 2021–2022: FC Dynamo Vladivostok (GK coach)
- 2022–2023: FC Torpedo-2 (GK coach)
- 2024–: FC Volgar Astrakhan (GK coach)
- * Club domestic league appearances and goals

Aleksandr Viktorovich Podshivalov (Russian: Александр Викторович Подшивалов; born 6 September 1964) is a Russian association football coach and a former player. He is the goalkeeping coach with FC Volgar Astrakhan.

In the first round of the 1992–93 UEFA Cup, he saved two penalty kicks from Steve Bruce and Gary Pallister in the penalty shootout that helped his team FC Torpedo Moscow beat Manchester United F.C.

== Honours ==
- FC Torpedo Moscow
  - Soviet Premier League bronze: 1991.
  - Russian Cup winner: 1993.
  - Russian Goalkeeper of the Year award: 1993.
- Yukong Elephants / Bucheon Yukong / Bucheon SK
  - K League runners-up : 1994
  - League Cup winners : 1996

== International career ==
Podshivalov played his only game for Russia on 6 October 1993 in a friendly against Saudi Arabia.
