= Andrei Mokh =

Russian footballer

Personal information
- Full name: Andrei Vladimirovich Mokh
- Date of birth: 20 October 1965 (age 61)
- Place of birth: Tomsk, Russian SFSR
- Height: 1.85 m (6 ft 1 in)
- Position: Defender

Youth career
- PFC CSKA Moscow

Senior career*
Years	Team	Apps	(Gls)
1984–1986	PFC CSKA Moscow	46	(6)
1987	SKA Karpaty Lviv	20	(2)
1988	PFC CSKA Moscow	33	(4)
1989–1991	FC Dynamo Moscow	46	(2)
1991	FC Spartak Moscow	20	(1)
1991–1993	RCD Espanyol	55	(1)
1993–1996	CD Toledo	91	(3)
1996–1997	Hércules CF	18	(0)
1997–1999	CD Leganés	35	(0)
Total		364	(19)

International career
1990	USSR	2	(0)
1993	Russia	1	(0)
- * Club domestic league appearances and goals

Andrei Vladimirovich Mokh (Russian: Андрей Владимирович Мох; born 20 October 1965 in Tomsk) is a retired Russian football player.

== International career ==
Mokh made his debut for USSR on 21 November 1990 in a friendly against United States. He also played one game for Russia on 24 March 1993 in a friendly against Israel.
