= Valeri Shmarov (footballer) =

Russian footballer and coach

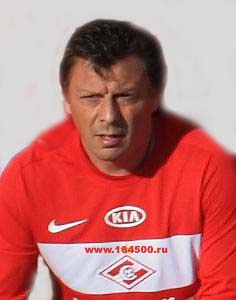
- Shmarov in May 2010

Personal information
- Full name: Valeri Valentinovich Shmarov
- Date of birth: 23 February 1965 (age 61)
- Place of birth: Voronezh, Russian SFSR
- Height: 1.80 m (5 ft 11 in)
- Position: Striker

Senior career*
Years	Team	Apps	(Gls)
1982–1984	FC Fakel Voronezh	56	(6)
1985	CSKA Moscow	40	(29)
1986	FC Fakel Voronezh	39	(12)
1987–1991	Spartak Moscow	120	(38)
1991–1994	Karlsruher SC	81	(10)
1994–1995	Arminia Bielefeld	10	(0)
1995–1996	Spartak Moscow	23	(16)
1996	Chunnam Dragons	3	(0)
1997–2001	FC Fakel Voronezh	56	(19)
2002	Arsenal Tula	15	(7)
Total		443	(137)

International career
1989–1990	USSR	3	(0)

Managerial career
- 2003: Chkalovets Novosibirsk
- 2006–2008: FCS-73 Voronezh
- 2009: Fakel-Voronezh Voronezh
- * Club domestic league appearances and goals

Valeri Valentinovich Shmarov (Russian: Валерий Валентинович Шмаров; born 23 February 1965) is a Russian former professional footballer and currently a coach.

== International career ==
Shmarov made his debut for USSR national football team on 23 August 1989 in a friendly against Poland. He was not selected for the 1990 FIFA World Cup squad.

== Personal life ==
His sons Denis Shmarov and Yegor Shmarov are also professional footballers (Denis is now retired and Yegor plays for the fourth-tier FC Tver, as of 2024).

== Honours ==
Spartak Moscow

- Soviet Top League: 1987, 1989

Individual

- Soviet Top League top scorer: 1990 (12 goals)
- Top 33 players year-end list: 1995
