= Igor Kozlov =

Russian footballer

Personal information
- Full name: Igor Valentinovich Kozlov
- Date of birth: 7 August 1970 (age 56)
- Place of birth: Moscow, Russian SFSR
- Height: 1.75 m (5 ft 9 in)
- Position: Midfielder

Youth career
- FC Spartak Moscow

Senior career*
Years	Team	Apps	(Gls)
1987–1988	FC Spartak Moscow	0	(0)
1989	FC Chaika-CSKA Moscow	32	(4)
1990	PFC CSKA Moscow	8	(0)
1991–1992	FC Spartak Moscow	2	(0)
1993–1994	FC Tekhinvest-M Moskovsky	38	(19)
1994–1996	Beveren	14	(1)
1997	FC Zenit St. Petersburg	1	(0)
1998	FC Spartak-Chukotka Moscow (amateur)		
1999	FC Spartak-Chukotka Moscow	34	(9)
2000	FC Khimki	7	(0)
2000	FC Vityaz Podolsk (amateur)		
2001	FC Vityaz Podolsk	34	(2)
- * Club domestic league appearances and goals

Igor Valentinovich Kozlov (Russian: Игорь Валентинович Козлов; born 7 August 1970) is a former Russian professional footballer.

== Club career ==
He made his professional debut in the Soviet Second League in 1989 for FC Chaika-CSKA Moscow. He played 1 game in the UEFA Cup 1991–92 for FC Spartak Moscow.

== Honours ==
- Soviet Top League runner-up: 1990, 1991.
- Soviet Cup winner: 1991 (played in the early stages of the 1990/91 tournament for PFC CSKA Moscow), 1992.
