= Vladimir Yeryomin (footballer) =

Soviet footballer

Personal information
- Full name: Vladimir Yuryevich Yeryomin
- Date of birth: 18 December 1965 (age 60)
- Place of birth: Smolensk, Russian SFSR
- Height: 1.82 m (5 ft 11 1/2 in)
- Position: Midfielder

Senior career*
| Years | Team | Apps | (Gls) |
| 1984 | FC Iskra Smolensk (reserves) | | |
| 1985 | FC Iskra Smolensk | 3 | (0) |
| 1986 | FC Metallurg Lipetsk | 11 | (0) |
| 1987 | FC Spartak Oryol | 18 | (2) |
| 1988–1990 | FC Chornomorets Odesa | 34 | (4) |
| 1991 | FC Torpedo Moscow | 3 | (0) |
| 1991 | FC Metalurh Zaporizhya | 12 | (1) |
- * Club domestic league appearances and goals

Vladimir Yuryevich Yeryomin (Russian: Владимир Юрьевич Ерёмин; born 18 December 1965) is a retired Soviet professional football player.

== Honours ==
- Soviet Top League bronze: 1991.
- USSR Federation Cup winner: 1990.
- 1990–91 UEFA Cup with FC Chornomorets Odesa: 2 games.
