= Dmitri Galiamin =

Russian footballer and official

Personal information
- Full name: Dmitri Aleksandrovich Galiamin
- Date of birth: 8 January 1963 (age 63)
- Place of birth: Moscow, Soviet Union
- Height: 1.80 m (5 ft 11 in)
- Position: Defender

Youth career
- Spartak Moscow

Senior career*
Years	Team	Apps	(Gls)
1980	Spartak Moscow	0	(0)
1981–1991	CSKA Moscow	292	(3)
1991–1994	Español	56	(0)
1994–1995	Mérida	8	(0)
Total		356	(3)

International career
1990–1991	Soviet Union	12	(0)
1992	CIS	1	(0)
1993–1994	Russia	6	(0)

Managerial career
- 1996–1999: Espanyol (assistant)
- 1999–2000: Palamós
- 2002: Dynamo St. Petersburg (sporting director)
- 2002: Dynamo St. Petersburg
- 2002–2003: Kristall Smolensk
- 2003: Khimki
- 2003: CSKA Moscow (assistant)
- 2003–2004: Tom Tomsk
- 2004–2006: Anzhi
- 2006: Spartak Nizhny Novgorod
- 2007–2008: UOR Master-Saturn Yegoryevsk (deputy director)
- 2008: Saturn Moscow Oblast (caretaker)
- 2008–2009: Saturn Moscow Oblast (sporting director)
- 2009–2010: Zenit St. Petersburg (head analyst)
- 2011–2012: Dynamo Moscow (academy director of sports)
- 2012–2013: Dynamo Moscow (sporting director)
- 2015–2016: Kairat (sporting director)
- 2016–2018: Kairat (academy director)
- 2020–2021: Krylia Sovetov Samara (sporting director)
- * Club domestic league appearances and goals

Dmitri Aleksandrovich Galiamin (Russian: Дмитрий Александрович Галямин; born 8 January 1963) is a Russian football coach/official and a former player who played as a defender.

== Club career ==
Galiamin was born in Moscow. He started playing with hometown's CSKA Moscow, being an automatic first-choice from his second season onwards and helping the team to the double in his final year, 1991.

Aged 28, Galiamin moved abroad, signing with Spanish club Espanyol, managing to appear sparingly during two La Liga seasons and being relegated in his second – he became a starter in 1993–94, helping the Catalans immediately return to the top level.

In the 1995 summer, due to constant injuries, Galiamin retired from the game at 32, after one season with Mérida (Spain, second level). In the following decade, already back in his country, he took up coaching, starting with Dynamo St. Petersburg then successively managing Kristall Smolensk, Khimki, Tom Tomsk, Anzhi Makhachkala, Spartak Nizhny Novgorod and UOR Master-Saturn Yegoryevsk; in 2002, he served as Saint Petersburg's director of football, occupying that position six years later at FC Saturn Moscow Oblast.

== International career ==
During four years, Galiamin represented three national teams – Soviet Union, CIS and Russia – earning a total of 19 caps. With the latter, he was picked for the 1994 FIFA World Cup, playing in the second half of the 1–3 group stage defeat against Sweden.
