= Aleksei Yushkov =

Russian footballer

Personal information
- Full name: Aleksei Anatolyevich Yushkov
- Date of birth: 1 February 1967
- Place of birth: Sverdlovsk, Soviet Union
- Date of death: 29 August 1996 (aged 29)
- Place of death: Novotroitsk, Russia
- Height: 1.81 m (5 ft 11 in)
- Positions: Defender; midfielder

Youth career
- FC Uralmash Sverdlovsk

Senior career*
| Years | Team | Apps | (Gls) |
| 1984–1989 | FC Uralmash Sverdlovsk | 150 | (6) |
| 1990 | FC Zenit Leningrad | 6 | (0) |
| 1990 | FC Uralmash Sverdlovsk | 34 | (11) |
| 1991 | FC Torpedo Moscow | 24 | (5) |
| 1992 | FC Dynamo Moscow | 0 | (0) |
| 1992–1995 | FC Uralmash Yekaterinburg | 104 | (1) |
| 1996 | FC Nosta Novotroitsk | 29 | (0) |
- * Club domestic league appearances and goals

Aleksei Anatolyevich Yushkov (Russian: Алексей Анатольевич Юшков; 1 February 1967 – 29 August 1996 in a car accident) was a Russian professional footballer.

== Club career ==
He made his professional debut in the Soviet Second League in 1984 for FC Uralmash Sverdlovsk. He played 1 game for FC Dynamo Moscow in the Soviet Cup.

== Honours ==
- Soviet Top League bronze: 1991.
- Soviet Cup finalist: 1991.

== European club competitions ==
With FC Torpedo Moscow.

- UEFA Cup 1990–91: 2 games.
- UEFA Cup 1991–92: 4 games.
