= Oleg Shirinbekov =

Tajikistani footballer (born 1963)

Personal information
- Full name: Oleg Khakimbekovich Shirinbekov
- Date of birth: 11 September 1963 (age 63)
- Place of birth: Shakhrinau, Tajik SSR
- Position: Midfielder

Team information
- Current team: Torpedo Moscow academy

Youth career
- 1979: SKIF Dushanbe
- 1980–1983: Pamir Dushanbe

Senior career*
Years	Team	Apps	(Gls)
1984–1986	Pamir Dushanbe	97	(11)
1987–1991	Torpedo Moscow	116	(10)
1991–1994	Vasas SC	85	(5)
1994–1995	Torpedo Moscow	42	(2)
1998	Torpedo-ZIL Moscow	28	(1)
Total		368	(29)

International career
1988	USSR	3	(0)
1997	Tajikistan	1	(0)

Managerial career
- 2001–2002: Torpedo-ZIL Moscow (assistant)
- 2003: Saturn-RenTV Ramenskoye (assistant)
- 2004–2013: CSKA Moscow
- 2013: Istiklol
- 2016: Torpedo Moscow academy
- 2019–2020: Buxoro (assistant)
- 2022–2023: Torpedo-2 (assistant)
- 2024–: Torpedo Moscow academy
- * Club domestic league appearances and goals

Oleg Khakimbekovich Shirinbekov (Russian: Олег Хакимбекович Ширинбеков; born 11 September 1963) is a Tajikistani football coach and a former footballer who played as a midfielder. He made three appearances for the USSR national team and one Tajikistan national team.

== Club career ==
Shirinbekov was born in Shakhrinau, then Tajik SSR, which was part of the Soviet Union. He began his career in Dushanbe with local side Pamir Dushanbe. In 1984, he was selected to play for the first team.

After 97 matches with Pamir, where he scored 11 goals, in 1987, Shirinbekov was signed by Moscow-based Torpedo Moscow from the top level of Soviet football. In Torpedo, Shirinbekov established himself as a regular starter and became one of Torpedo's most important players. His stay at the club was also coincidental with Torpedo's golden period, when the team was among the leading clubs in the league. He was also part of the Torpedo side which reached the quarterfinal of the 1990–91 UEFA Cup. Shirinbekov scored a memorable goal for Torpedo in the second leg of the quarterfinal against Brøndby, when he scored in the 87th minute to equalize in the second leg played in Moscow. Torpedo were, however, eliminated after a penalty shootout.

In 1991, Shirinbekov signed a contract with Hungarian club Vasas SC from Budapest. He spent three seasons in Vasas, amassing 85 appearances.

In 1994, Shirinbekov returned to Torpedo for two seasons, where he made 42 appearances. After the 1994 season, Shirinbekov retired from football. However, in 1998, he returned on the pitch, signing a contract with FC Torpedo-ZIL Moscow, which was a newly established team with the intention of replacing the original Torpedo, who were in financial problems. He played 28 games and scored one goal.

== International career ==
Shirinbekov made his debut for USSR on 21 November 1988 in a friendly against Syria.

== Managerial career ==
Shirinbekov was sacked as Istiqlol Dushanbe manager in January 2014.
