= Aleksandr Polukarov =

Russian footballer

Aleksandr Polukarov Александр Полукаров
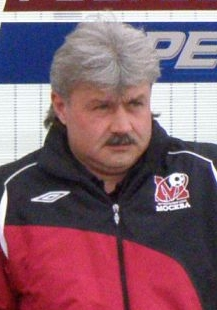

Personal information
- Full name: Aleksandr Vasilyevich Polukarov
- Date of birth: November 27, 1959 (age 66)
- Place of birth: Luhansk, Ukrainian SSR
- Height: 1.81 m (5 ft 11 1/2 in)
- Positions: Defender; midfielder

Senior career*
Years	Team	Apps	(Gls)
1977–1979	Zorya Voroshilovgrad	39	(3)
1980–1991	Torpedo Moscow	319	(21)
1991–1994	Maccabi Tel Aviv	98	(5)
1994–1995	Maccabi Herzliya	20	(0)
1995–1996	Hapoel Jerusalem		
1996–1997	Maccabi Ironi Ashdod		
1997–1998	Bnei Sakhnin		(2)
1998	Torpedo-ZIL Moscow	17	(0)

Managerial career
- 2001–2007: FC Moscow (assistant)
- 2008: FC Moscow (director)
- 2009–2010: FC Moscow (director/assistant)
- 2010: FC Moscow (caretaker)
- * Club domestic league appearances and goals

Aleksandr Vasilyevich Polukarov (Russian: Александр Васильевич Полукаров; born November 27, 1959) is a Russian professional football coach and a former player. As of 2009, he worked as a director and assistant coach for FC Moscow.

As a youth player he contested the 1979 FIFA World Youth Championship and the 1982 UEFA European Under-21 Championship.

== Honours ==
- Soviet Top League bronze: 1988, 1991.
- Soviet Cup winner: 1986.
- Soviet Cup finalist: 1982, 1988, 1989, 1991.

== European club competitions ==
- European Cup Winners' Cup 1986–87 with FC Torpedo Moscow: 5 games.
- UEFA Cup 1988–89 with FC Torpedo Moscow: 2 games.
- European Cup Winners' Cup 1989–90 with FC Torpedo Moscow: 4 games.
- UEFA Cup 1990–91 with FC Torpedo Moscow: 7 games.
- UEFA Champions League 1992–93 qualification with Maccabi Tel Aviv: 2 games.
