= Sergey Igorevich Dmitriyev =

Russian footballer (1964–2022)

Sergey Dmitriyev Сергей Дмитриев
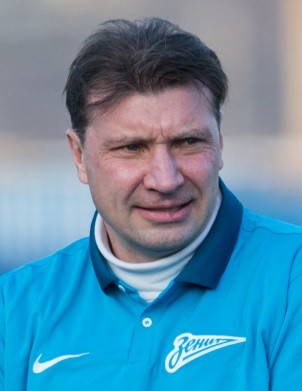
- Dmitriyev with Zenit Leningrad

Personal information
- Full name: Sergey Igorevich Dmitriyev
- Date of birth: 19 March 1964
- Place of birth: Leningrad, Russian SFSR, USSR
- Date of death: 26 December 2022 (aged 58)
- Height: 1.86 m (6 ft 1 in)
- Position: Striker

Youth career
- Smena Leningrad

Senior career*
Years	Team	Apps	(Gls)
1981–1982	Dynamo Leningrad	14	(1)
1982–1988	Zenit Leningrad	129	(38)
1989	Dynamo Moscow	4	(0)
1989–1990	CSKA Moscow	36	(10)
1990–1991	Xerez CD	11	(2)
1991	CSKA Moscow	16	(4)
1991–1993	Stahl Linz	12	(1)
1993–1994	FC St. Gallen	14	(9)
1993–1994	SpVgg Beckum	5	(0)
1993–1994	Hapoel Ashkelon	3	(1)
1995–1996	Zenit Saint Petersburg	37	(15)
1997	FC Tyumen	9	(0)
1997	Spartak Moscow	6	(1)
1998–1999	Dynamo Saint Petersburg	15	(2)
1999	Kristall Smolensk	13	(1)
2001–2002	Svetogorets Svetogorsk	29	(6)

International career
1986–1988	USSR (Olympic)	1	(0)
1985–1988	USSR	6	(1)

Managerial career
- Svetogorets Svetogorsk (assistant)
- 2004–2005: Anzhi Makhachkala (assistant)
- 2006: Spartak Nizhny Novgorod (assistant)
- 2006: Petrotrest Saint Petersburg (assistant)
- 2006–2007: Dynamo Saint Petersburg
- 2008: Brunei
- 2009: Saturn-2 Moscow Oblast (assistant)
- 2010: Volga Tver (assistant)
- 2011–2012: Karelia Petrozavodsk
- 2013: Petrotrest Saint Petersburg (caretaker)
- 2015: Sakhalin Yuzhno-Sakhalinsk (U-21)
- 2016–2018: Tosno (U-21)
- * Club domestic league appearances and goals

Sergey Igorevich Dmitriyev (Russian: Сергей Игоревич Дмитриев; 19 March 1964 – 26 December 2022) was a Russian football coach and a player.

== International career ==
Dmitriyev earned six caps for the USSR national football team, and was on the squad for UEFA Euro 1988, but did not play in any games at the tournament. He scored his only goal for USSR on 2 February 1985 in a friendly against Morocco.

== Personal life and death ==
Dmitriyev's second wife was Svetlana Laukhova. He was part of Zenit Saint Petersburg.

Dmitriyev died from leukemia on 26 December 2022 at the age of 58.

== Honours ==
- Soviet Top League: 1984, 1991
- Soviet Cup: 1991
- Russian Top League: 1997
- Russian Cup: 1998
