= Dmitri Kuznetsov (footballer, born 1965) =

Russian footballer

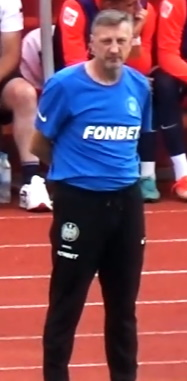

Personal information
- Full name: Dmitri Viktorovich Kuznetsov
- Date of birth: 28 August 1965 (age 61)
- Place of birth: Moscow, Soviet Union
- Height: 1.79 m (5 ft 10 in)
- Positions: Defender; midfielder

Senior career*
Years	Team	Apps	(Gls)
1982–1983	Youth Torpedo Moscow	26	(1)
1984–1991	CSKA Moscow	254	(43)
1991–1992	Espanyol	13	(4)
1992	CSKA Moscow	7	(5)
1992–1995	Espanyol	70	(6)
1995	Lleida	14	(2)
1995–1997	Deportivo Alavés	33	(3)
1997	Osasuna	30	(5)
1997–1998	CSKA Moscow	30	(1)
1998	Arsenal Tula	18	(1)
1999	Nizhny Novgorod	25	(4)
2000–2001	Sokol Saratov	36	(2)
2002	Torpedo Moscow	14	(1)
2002	Volgar	13	(0)
Total		583	(78)

International career
1986–1988	USSR (Olympic)	1	(0)
1990–1991	USSR	12	(2)
1992	CIS	8	(0)
1994	Russia	8	(0)

Managerial career
- 2004: FC Norilsky Nikel Norilsk
- 2005: FC LUKoil Chelyabinsk
- 2007–2008: FC Nizhny Novgorod
- 2014–2017: FC Rubin Kazan (assistant)
- 2017–2019: FC Irtysh Pavlodar (assistant)
- 2021-2025: FC 2DROTS
- * Club domestic league appearances and goals

Dmitri Viktorovich Kuznetsov (Russian: Дмитрий Викторович Кузнецов; born 28 August 1965) is an association football coach and a former player.

During his club career he played for CSKA Moscow, RCD Espanyol, UE Lleida, Deportivo Alavés and CA Osasuna. He earned 28 caps and scored 2 goals for USSR, CIS and Russia from 1990 to 1994, and played in the 1992 UEFA European Football Championship and the 1994 FIFA World Cup. In 2009, he was part of the Russia squad that won the 2009 Legends Cup.

He played 2 games in the European Cup Winners' Cup 1991–92 for PFC CSKA Moscow.

== Honours ==
- Soviet Top League champion: 1991.
- Soviet Top League runner-up: 1990.
- Soviet Cup winner: 1991.
- Russian Premier League runner-up: 1998.
