= Mikhail Yeryomin =

Soviet footballer

Personal information
- Full name: Mikhail Vasilyevich Yeryomin
- Date of birth: 17 June 1968
- Place of birth: Zelenograd, Soviet Union
- Date of death: 30 June 1991 (aged 23)
- Place of death: Zelenograd, Soviet Union
- Height: 1.94 m (6 ft 4 1/2 in)
- Position: Goalkeeper

Youth career
- CSKA Moscow

Senior career*
Years	Team	Apps	(Gls)
1986–1988	CSKA-2 Moscow	14	(0)
1988–1989	Spartak Moscow	0	(0)
1989–1991	CSKA Moscow	52	(0)

International career
1990	Soviet Union	2	(0)
- * Club domestic league appearances and goals

Mikhail Vasilyevich Yeryomin (Russian: Михаил Васильевич Ерёмин; 17 June 1968 – 30 June 1991) was a Soviet football goalkeeper.

== Career ==
Mikhail Yeryomin started playing for CSKA Moscow in 1986. With this club he won USSR Football Championship in 1991 and Soviet Cup the same year.

He played one match for Soviet Union national team on 29 August 1990 in a friendly against Romania.

== Death ==
Late night on 23 June 1991, on the way home from USSR Cup Final won by his team, Yeryomin lost control of his vehicle due to a damaged tyre and crashed into a bus. He died from injuries in hospital on 30 June 1991.

In his memory CSKA established prize for The Best Young Goalkeeper of Top League. This prize was received amongst others by Dmitri Kharine and Sergei Ovchinnikov.
