= 1990–91 Soviet Cup =

1990–91 Cup of USSR in Football
Кубок СССР

Tournament details
- Country: Soviet Union
- Dates: April 14, 1990 – June 23, 1991

Final positions
- Champions: CSKA Moscow
- Runners-up: Torpedo Moscow

The 1990–91 Soviet Cup was cup competition of the Soviet Union. The winner of the competition CSKA Moscow qualified for the continental tournament. Teams from Lithuania and Georgia withdrew from all of the Soviet competitions.

== Political background ==
Although Georgian teams withdrew from the Football Federation of the Soviet Union at the end of 1989, except for FC Dynamo Sukhumi due to the Russian occupation of Abkhazia (Abkhazia conflict), they were included in the cup competition and awarded technical losses.

The Lithuanian clubs, even though they have withdrawn from most of the Soviet Union competitions, competed at the 1990 Baltic League which was a temporary compromise between the Baltic states and the Soviet Union. Nonetheless, Lithuanian Zalgiris without its agreement was included in the competition and was awarded a technical loss.

In addition to Lithuanian and Georgian clubs Neftçi PFK which was eliminated by FC Rotor Volgograd on July 17, 1989, never again participated in the Soviet Cup thereafter.

Beside the Abkhazia conflict and the already ongoing Nagorno-Karabakh War in the Caucasus region, number of other places of the falling apart Soviet Union were engulfed in armed conflicts during the time span of the competition such as the Transnistrian War in late 1990 and the 1991 January Events in Lithuania.

In July of 1990, the New Union Treaty was proposed at the CPSU Congress.

== Competition overview ==
Teams of the first and second leagues will begin the games of the 1/64 finals on April 14 using a system with elimination after the first defeat. If the match ends in a draw, then extra time is assigned - two halves of 15 minutes each. If extra time does not reveal the winner, then, in accordance with FIFA Regulations, the best team is determined using penalty kicks. In competitions for the USSR Cup, no more than three players are allowed to be replaced during the game.

All teams in the 1/64 finals are distributed by lot and the “home team” of the field received odd numbers, and in the 1/32 finals, the venues for the games are determined by the difference in receptions and departures between the meeting teams. Teams that have traveled in the previous round have an advantage. In case of equality of receptions and departures, the venues for the next games are determined by lot. The games of this round are held on May 2.

In the 1/16 finals, according to the Cup grid, 16 teams of the major league meet with the winners of the 1/32 final pairs (May 22), and in the first games of the 1/16 finals, the “hosts” of the field in all 16 pairs are the winning teams of the pairs 1/32 finals, and in the return matches (July 19-20) their rivals, the major league teams, play on their own fields. The stages of 1/16 and 1/8 finals are played in two games - on your own field and on the opponent's field. For the first games of the 1/8 finals, the “home” fields are determined by lot. The matches of this stage will take place on November 17-18 and 23-24.

The winners of the pairs of 1/16 and 1/8 finals are determined by the overall result of both games according to the UEFA rules approved for European cup tournaments of club teams. The quarter-final, semi-final and final games will take place next year.

== Participating teams ==
| Enter in Round of 32 | Enter in First Preliminary Round | | | |
| 1990 Vysshaya Liga; 16/16 teams | 1990 Pervaya Liga; 22/22 teams | 1990 Vtoraya Liga; 40/66 teams | | |
| ✓ Dinamo Kiev; ✓ CSKA Moscow; ✓ Dinamo Moscow; ✓ Torpedo Moscow; ✓ Spartak Moscow; ✓ Dnepr Dnepropetrovsk; ✓ Ararat Erevan; ✓ Shakhter Donetsk; ✓ Chernomorets Odessa; ✓ Pamir Dushambe; ✓ Metallist Kharkov; ✓ Dinamo Minsk; ✓ Rotor Volgograd (v); ✓ Zalgiris Vilnius (v); ✓ Iberia Tbilisi (v); ✓ Guria Lanchkhuti (v) | ✓ Spartak Ordzhonikidze (^); ✓ Pakhtakor Tashkent (^); ✓ Metallurg Zaporozhie (^); ✓ Lokomotiv Moscow (^); ✓ Dinamo Stavropol; ✓ Shinnik Yaroslavl; ✓ Zimbrul Kishenev; ✓ Neftchi Baku; ✓ Tavria Simferopol; ✓ Fakel Voronezh; ✓ Geolog Tyumen; ✓ Dinamo Sukhumi; ✓ Tiligul Tiraspol; ✓ Kotaik Abovian; ✓ Rostselmash Rostov-na-Donu; ✓ Lokomotiv Gorky; ✓ Kairat Alma-Ata; ✓ Zenit Leningrad; ✓ Kuban Krasnodar; ✓ Kuzbass Kemerovo (v); ✓ FC Kutaisi (v); ✓ FC Batumi (v) | ✓ Bukovina Chernovtsy (^); ✓ Daugava Riga (^); ✓ Niva Ternopol; ✓ Volyn Lutsk; ✓ Vorskla Poltava; ✓ Niva Vinnitsa; ✓ SFC Drogobich; ✓ Karpaty Lvov; ✓ Kremen Kremenchug; ✓ SKA Odessa; ✓ Zarya Voroshilovgrad | ✓ Uralmash Yekaterinburg (^); ✓ Tekstilschik Kamyshin (^); ✓ Volgar Astrakhan; ✓ Zvezda Perm; ✓ Zenit Izhevsk; ✓ Krylia Sovetov Samara; ✓ Gastello Ufa; ✓ Mashuk Piatigorsk; ✓ SKA Rostov-na-Donu; ✓ Metallurg Lipetsk; ✓ Terek Grozny; ✓ Torpedo Vladimir; ✓ Sokol Saratov; ✓ Torpedo Ryazan; ✓ Tsement Novorossiysk | ✓ Neftianik Fergana (^); ✓ Novbakhor Namangan (^); ✓ Alga Bishkek; ✓ Vakhsh Kurgan-Tyube; ✓ Meliorator Chimkent; ✓ Okean Nakhodka; ✓ Zvezda Irkutsk; ✓ Sogdiana Dzhyzak; ✓ Traktor Pavlodar; ✓ Tselinnik Tselinograd; ✓ Dinamo Barnaul |
| ✓ Dinamo Kiev; ✓ CSKA Moscow; ✓ Dinamo Moscow; ✓ Torpedo Moscow; ✓ Spartak Moscow; ✓ Dnepr Dnepropetrovsk; ✓ Ararat Erevan; ✓ Shakhter Donetsk; ✓ Chernomorets Odessa; ✓ Pamir Dushambe; ✓ Metallist Kharkov; ✓ Dinamo Minsk; ✓ Rotor Volgograd (v); ✓ Zalgiris Vilnius (v); ✓ Iberia Tbilisi (v); ✓ Guria Lanchkhuti (v) | ✓ Spartak Ordzhonikidze (^); ✓ Pakhtakor Tashkent (^); ✓ Metallurg Zaporozhie (^); ✓ Lokomotiv Moscow (^); ✓ Dinamo Stavropol; ✓ Shinnik Yaroslavl; ✓ Zimbrul Kishenev; ✓ Neftchi Baku; ✓ Tavria Simferopol; ✓ Fakel Voronezh; ✓ Geolog Tyumen; ✓ Dinamo Sukhumi; ✓ Tiligul Tiraspol; ✓ Kotaik Abovian; ✓ Rostselmash Rostov-na-Donu; ✓ Lokomotiv Gorky; ✓ Kairat Alma-Ata; ✓ Zenit Leningrad; ✓ Kuban Krasnodar; ✓ Kuzbass Kemerovo (v); ✓ FC Kutaisi (v); ✓ FC Batumi (v) | ✓ Kolkheti Khobi ✓ Kolkheti 1913 Poti ✓ Sanavardo Samtredia | | |

Source: []

== Competition schedule ==
=== First preliminary round ===
All games took place on April 14, 1990.

| Team 1 | Score | Team 2 |
April 14
| Alga Frunze (III) | 2–1 | (III) Vakhsh Kurgan-Tube |
| Bukovina Chernovtsy (III) | 2–0 | (III) Niva Ternopol |
| Volgar Astrakhan (III) | +/– | (II) FC Kutaisi |
| Volyn Lutsk (III) | 1–2 | (II) Tavria Simferopol |
| Vorskla Poltava (III) | 0–0 (a.e.t.) (4–1 p) | (III) Niva Vinnitsa |
| SFC Drogobich (III) | 2–1 | (II) Metallurg Zaporozhie |
| Zvezda Perm (III) | 5–0 | (II) Fakel Voronezh |
| Zenit Izhevsk (III) | 2–0 | (II) Kuban Krasnodar |
| Karpaty Lvov (III) | 2–1 | (II) Nistru Kishenev |
| Kolkheti Khobi (III) | –/+ | (II) Dinamo Stavropol |
| Kolkheti 1913 Poti (III) | +/– | (III) Sanavardo Samtredia |
| Kremen Kremenchug (III) | 1–0 | (II) Tiras Tiraspol |
| Krylia Sovetov Samara (III) | 1–1 (a.e.t.) (3–5 p) | (III) Gastello Ufa |
| Mashuk Pyatigorsk (III) | +/– | (II) FC Batumi |
| Meliorator Chimkent (III) | 2–0 | (II) Kairat Alma-Ata |
| Metallurg Lipetsk (III) | 3–0 | (II) Rostselmash Rostov-on-Don |
| Neftyanik Fergana (III) | 4–0 | (II) Geolog Tyumen |
| Novbakhor Namangan (III) | +/– | (II) Neftchi Baku |
| Okean Nakhodka (III) | +/– | (III) Zvezda Irkutsk |
| SKA Odessa (III) | 0–0 (a.e.t.) (2–4 p) | (II) Zenit Leningrad |
| SKA Rostov-on-Don (III) | 3–2 | (II) Dinamo Sukhumi |
| Sogdiana Jizzak (III) | +/– | (II) Kuzbass Kemerovo |
| Tekstilshchik Kamyshyn (III) | 8–1 | (II) Kotaik Abovian |
| Terek Grozny (III) | 1–1 (a.e.t.) (4–3 p) | (II) Spartak Vladikavkaz |
| Torpedo Vladimir (III) | 3–0 | (III) Sokol Saratov |
| Torpedo Ryazan (III) | 1–2 | (II) Shinnik Yaroslavl |
| Traktor Pavlodar (III) | 2–0 | (II) Pakhtakor Tashkent |
| Uralmash Sverdlovsk (III) | 1–0 | (II) Lokomotiv Nizhniy Novgorod |
| Tselinnik Tselinograd (III) | 3–2 | (III) Dinamo Barnaul |
| Tsement Novorossiysk (III) | 2–0 | (III) Zaria Lugansk |
| Daugava Riga (III) | bye | |
| Lokomotiv Moscow (II) | bye | |

=== Second preliminary round ===
Games took place on May 2, 1990. Daugava Riga and Lokomotiv Moscow received bye to this stage.

| Team 1 | Score | Team 2 |
May 2
| Gastello Ufa (III) | +/– | (III) Zvezda Perm |
| Daugava Riga (III) | 4–1 | (III) SFC Drogobich |
| Dinamo Stavropol (II) | +/– | (III) Terek Grozny |
| Zenit Izhevsk (III) | 0–0 (a.e.t.) (2–4 p) | (III) Uralmash Sverdlovsk |
| Zenit Leningrad (II) | 1–0 | (III) Vorskla Poltava |
| Karpaty Lvov (III) | +/– | (III) Kremen Kremenchug |
| Mashuk Pyatigorsk (III) | +/– | (III) Kolkheti 1913 Poti |
| Neftyanik Fergana (III) | 6–0 | (III) Meliorator Chimkent |
| Novbakhor Namangan (III) | 1–2 | (III) Alga Frunze |
| SKA Rostov-on-Don (III) | 2–0 (a.e.t.) | (III) Tsement Novorossiysk |
| Tavria Simferopol (II) | 3–1 (a.e.t.) | (III) Bukovina Chernovtsy |
| Tekstilshchik Kamyshin (III) | 6–0 | (III) Volgar Astrakhan |
| Traktor Pavlodar (III) | +/– | (III) Okean Nakhodka |
| Tselinnik Tselinograd (III) | +/– | (III) Sogdiana Jizzak |
| Shinnik Yaroslavl (II) | 1–0 | (III) Metallurg Lipetsk |
September 9
| Lokomotiv Moscow (II) | 3–1 | (III) Torpedo Vladimir |

=== Bracket ===
Round of 32
Shinnik Yaroslavl | + | + | +
Guria Lanchkhuti | - | - | -
Lokomotiv Moscow | + | + | +
Zalgiris Vilnius | - | - | -
Gastello Ufa | 3 | 0 | 3
Rotor Volgograd | 1 | 1 | 2
Uralmash Sverdlovsk | 3 | 2 | 5
Pamir Dushanbe | 2 | 3 | 5
Neftianik Fergana | 0 | 1 | 1
CSKA Moscow | 2 | 3 | 5
Alga Frunze | 2 | 0 | 2
Dnepr Dnepropetrovsk | 1 | 4 | 5
Traktor Pavlodar | 2 | 0 | 2
Dinamo Minsk | 3 | 4 | 7
Tselinnik Tselinograd | 0 | 1 | 1
Shakhter Donetsk | 2 | 2 | 4
Zenit Leningrad | 1 | 0 | 1
Torpedo Moscow | 2 | 2 | 4
Karpaty Lvov (a) | 0 | 2 | 2
Metallist Kharkov | 1 | 1 | 2
Tavria Simferopol | 1 | 0 | 1
Dinamo Moscow | 0 | 4 | 4
Daugava Riga | 2 | 0 | 2
Spartak Moscow | 0 | 5 | 5
Tekstilschik Kamyshin | 0 | 1 | +
Dinamo Kiev | 0 | 7 | -
SKA Rostov-na-Donu | 2 | 0 | 2
Ararat Yerevan | 1 | 5 | 6
Dinamo Stavropol | + | + | +
Iberia Tbilisi | - | - | -
Mashuk Piatigorsk | 1 | 0 | 1
Chornomorets Odesa | 1 | 3 | 4

Round of 16
Shinnik Yaroslavl | - | 0 | -
Lokomotiv Moscow | + | 0 | +
Gastello Ufa | 1 | 0 | 1
Uralmash Sverdlovsk | 2 | 2 | 4
CSKA Moscow | 4 | 2 | 6
Dnepr Dnepropetrovsk | 1 | 2 | 3
Dinamo Minsk | 3 | 1 | 4
Shakhter Donetsk | 1 | 1 | 2
Torpedo Moscow | 2 | 3 | 5
Karpaty Lvov | 0 | 1 | 1
Dinamo Moscow | 1 | 1 | 2
Spartak Moscow | 1 | 2 | 3
Tekstilschik Kamyshin | 1 | - | -
Ararat Yerevan | 1 | + | +
Dinamo Stavropol | 1 | 0 | 1
Chernomorets Odessa | 0 | 2 | 2

Quarterfinals
Lokomotiv Moscow | 2
Uralmash Sverdlovsk | 0
CSKA Moscow | 4
Dinamo Minsk | 1
Torpedo Moscow (p) | 0(3)
Spartak Moscow | 0(1)
Ararat Yerevan | 1
Chernomorets Odessa | 0

Semifinals
Lokomotiv Moscow | 0
CSKA Moscow | 3
Torpedo Moscow (p) | 0(7)
Ararat Yerevan | 0(6)

Final
CSKA Moscow | 3
Torpedo Moscow | 2

=== Round of 32 ===
First games took place on May 22, 1990, while second games were initially scheduled on July 18–21. With the Soviet Union falling apart some games were played much later.

| Team 1 | Agg. | Team 2 | 1st leg | 2nd leg |
First leg – May 22, Second leg – July 18
| Uralmash Sverdlovsk (III) | 5–5 | (I) Pamir Dushanbe | 3–2 | 2–3 |
First leg – May 22, Second leg – July 19
| Tavria Simferopol (II) | 1–4 | (I) Dinamo Moscow | 1–0 | 0–4 |
First leg – May 22, Second leg – July 20
| Zenit Leningrad (II) | 1–4 | (I) Torpedo Moscow | 1–2 | 0–2 |
| Mashuk Piatigorsk (III) | 1–4 | (I) Chernomorets Odessa | 1–1 | 0–3 |
| Tselinnik Tselinograd (III) | 1–4 | (I) Shakhter Donetsk | 1–2 | 0–2 |
| Gastello Ufa (III) | 3–2 | (I) Rotor Volgograd | 3–1 | 0–1 |
| Traktor Pavlodar (III) | 2–7 | (I) Dinamo Minsk | 2–3 | 0–4 |
| Alga Frunze (III) | 2–5 | (I) Dnepr Dnepropetrovsk | 2–1 | 0–4 |
First leg – May 22, Second leg – July 21
| Karpaty Lvov (III) | 2–2 (a) | (I) Metalist Kharkov | 0–1 | 2–1 |
| Daugava Riga (III) | 2–5 | (I) Spartak Moscow | 2–0 | 0–5 |
| Neftianik Fergana (III) | 1–5 | (I) CSKA Moscow | 0–2 | 1–3 |
First leg – May 22, Second leg – November 3
| SKA Rostov-na-Donu (III) | 2–6 | (I) Ararat Yerevan | 2–1 | 0–5 |
First leg – May 22, Second leg – DNP
| Dinamo Stavropol (II) | w/o | (I) Iberia Tbilisi | +/– | DNP |
| Lokomotiv Moscow (II) | w/o | (I) Zalgiris Vilnius | +/– | DNP |
| Shinnik Yaroslavl (II) | w/o | (I) Guria Lanchkhuti | +/– | DNP |
First leg – July 20, Second leg – August 3
| Tekstilschik Kamyshin (III) | w/o | (I) Dinamo Kiev | 0–0 | 1–7 |

=== Round of 16 ===
First games took place on November 11–13, 1990, while most second games were played on November 17. Both games of Shinnik and Lokomotiv match up were played in March 1991. Lokomotiv Moscow was drawn with Shinnik as a member of the 2nd tier, but played its legs already as a member of the 1st tier.

| Team 1 | Agg. | Team 2 | 1st leg | 2nd leg |
First leg – November 11, Second leg – November 17
| Gastello Ufa (III) | 1–4 | (III) Uralmash Sverdlovsk | 1–2 | 0–2 |
| Dinamo Minsk (I) | 4–2 | (I) Shakhter Donetsk | 3–1 | 1–1 |
| Dynamo Stavropol (II) | 1–2 | (I) Chernomorets Odessa | 1–0 | 0–2 |
| Tekstilschik Kamyshin (III) | -/+ | (I) Ararat Yerevan | 1–1 | -/+ |
| CSKA Moscow (I) | 6–3 | (I) Dnepr Dnepropetrovsk | 4–1 | 2–2 |
First leg – November 12, Second leg – November 17
| Torpedo Moscow (I) | 5–1 | (III) Karpaty Lvov | 2–0 | 3–1 |
First leg – November 13, Second leg – November 17
| Dynamo Moscow (I) | 2–3 | (I) Spartak Moscow | 1–1 | 1–2 |
First leg – March 1, Second leg – March 5
| Shinnik Yaroslavl (II) | -/+ | (II→I) Lokomotiv Moscow | -/+ | 0–0 |

=== Quarter-finals ===
| Team 1 | Score | Team 2 |
March 1
| Torpedo Moscow (I) | 0–0 (3–1 p) | (I) Spartak Moscow |
March 3
| Ararat Yerevan (I) | 1–0 | (I) Chornomorets Odesa |
March 6
| CSKA Moscow (I) | 4–1 | (I) Dinamo Minsk |
April 2
| Lokomotiv Moscow (I) | 2–0 | (II) Uralmash Sverdlovsk |

=== Semi-finals ===
Both games took place on 10 May 1991.

| Team 1 | Score | Team 2 |
May 10
| Lokomotiv Moscow (I) | 0–3 | (I) CSKA Moscow |
| Torpedo Moscow (I) | 0–0 (7–6 p) | (I) Ararat Yerevan |

=== Final ===
23 June 1991
?:? LST

| CSKA Moscow | 3 – 2 | Torpedo Moscow |
|---|---|---|
| Igor Korneyev 45', 67'; Oleg Sergeyev 80' | Report | Yuriy Tishkov 43', 75' |

Lenin's Central Stadium, Moscow
Attendance: 37,000
Referee: Valeriy Butenko (Moscow)
