= Valeri Broshin =

Russian-Turkmen footballer

Valeri Broshin Валерий Брошин

Personal information
- Full name: Valeri Viktorovich Broshin
- Date of birth: 19 October 1962
- Place of birth: Leningrad, USSR
- Date of death: 5 March 2009 (aged 46)
- Place of death: Moscow, Russia
- Height: 1.72 m (5 ft 8 in)
- Position: Midfielder

Youth career
- Smena Leningrad

Senior career*
Years	Team	Apps	(Gls)
1980–1985	Zenit Leningrad	107	(8)
1986–1991	CSKA Moscow	176	(34)
1992	KuPS	20	(5)
1992–1993	CD Badajoz	16	(3)
1993	CSKA Moscow	28	(5)
1993–1994	Hapoel Kfar Saba	7	(0)
1994	Maccabi Petah Tikva	6	(0)
1994	Zenit Saint Petersburg	10	(0)
1995–1998	Köpetdag Aşgabat		
1999	SKA Rostov-on-Don	14	(1)
2000	Nika Moscow		
2001	Gomel	23	(2)

International career
1987	USSR (Olympic)	2	(0)
1987–1990	USSR	3	(0)
1997–1998	Turkmenistan	11	(1)

Managerial career
- 2001–2002: Gomel (assistant)
- 2005–2006: Nika Moscow (assistant)
- * Club domestic league appearances and goals

Valeri (or Valery) Viktorovich Broshin (Russian: Валерий Викторович Брошин; 19 October 1962, Leningrad – 5 March 2009, Moscow) was a Russian professional footballer and football manager.

== Career ==
During his playing career, he appeared with clubs such as FC Zenit Saint Petersburg and PFC CSKA Moscow. He earned 3 caps for the USSR national football team, and participated in the 1990 FIFA World Cup finals. He later received Turkmenistani citizenship in order to be eligible to play on the Turkmenistan national football team (1997–98).

He was the manager of FC Nika Moscow in 2005–06 season.

In 2009, Broshin died of cancer at the age of 46.
