= Andriy Kovtun =

Ukrainian footballer (born 1968)

Personal information
- Full name: Andriy Oleksandrovych Kovtun
- Date of birth: 28 February 1968 (age 58)
- Place of birth: Nizhyn, Ukrainian SSR
- Height: 1.82 m (6 ft 0 in)
- Position: Goalkeeper

Senior career*
Years	Team	Apps	(Gls)
1985	Dnipro Dnipropetrovsk	0	(0)
1985–1986	Dynamo Kyiv	0	(0)
1986	SKA Kyiv	5	(0)
1987–1989	Dynamo Kyiv	0	(0)
1989	Guria Lanchkhuti	0	(0)
1990–1991	Shakhtar Donetsk	44	(0)
1992–1996	Dynamo Kyiv	26	(0)
1992–1993	→ Dynamo-2 Kyiv	54	(0)
1994	→ Kryvbas Kryvyi Rih (loan)	14	(0)
1996–2000	Vorskla Poltava	122	(0)
1997–1999	→ Vorskla-2 Poltava	3	(0)
2001–2002	Zakarpattia Uzhhorod	37	(0)
2006	Knyazha Shchaslyve	5	(0)
Total		310	(0)

International career
1990	USSR U-21	2	(0)
1993	Ukraine	2	(0)

Managerial career
- 2008–2009: CSKA Kyiv
- 2009–2010: Veres Rivne
- 2011–2022: Oleksandriya (goalkeeping coach)
Medal record
Men's football
Representing Soviet Union
UEFA European Under-21 Championship
Winner	1990 Europe
- * Club domestic league appearances and goals

Andriy Oleksandrovych Kovtun (Ukrainian: Андрій Олександрович Ковтун; born 28 February 1968) is a Ukrainian former professional footballer who played as a goalkeeper. He made his professional debut in the Soviet Top League in 1990 for FC Shakhtar Donetsk.

== Honours ==
Dynamo Kyiv

- Ukrainian Premier League: (4) 1992–93, 1993–94, 1994–95, 1995–96.
- Ukrainian Cup: (2) 1992–93, 1995–96
