= Yuri Tishkov =

Russian footballer (1971–2003)

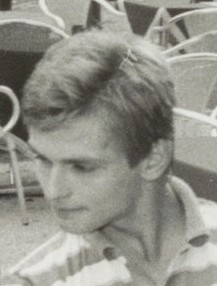
- Tishkov in 1989

Personal information
- Full name: Yuri Ivanovich Tishkov
- Date of birth: 12 March 1971
- Place of birth: Moscow, Russian SFSR, USSR
- Date of death: 11 January 2003 (aged 31)
- Place of death: Moscow, Russia
- Height: 1.80 m (5 ft 11 in)
- Position: Striker

Senior career*
Years	Team	Apps	(Gls)
1987–1992	Torpedo Moscow	47	(12)
1993–1997	Dynamo Moscow	45	(6)
1998	Rubin Kazan	18	(0)
Total		110	(18)
- * Club domestic league appearances and goals

Yuri Ivanovich Tishkov (Russian: Ю́рий Ива́нович Тишко́в; 12 March 1971 – 11 January 2003) was a Russian professional footballer, sports agent and commentator who was murdered at age 31.

== Club career ==
Tishkov made his professional debut in the Soviet Top League in 1988 for Torpedo Moscow.

He retired relatively young after he was unable to fully recover from a serious injury he suffered in a Russian Cup 1993–94 game against FC Viktor-Avangard Kolomna. The injury was inflicted by Sergei Bodak (Bodak was originally banned from football for life for that foul, but the ban was lifted after one year).

== Death ==
Tishkov was stabbed to death on 11 January 2003, in Moscow, where his body was found outside his home. He was working as player agent at the time, and it was speculated that his murder was linked to a contract dispute with one of his clients. Despite widespread publicity and pleas for information, Tishkov's murder remains unsolved.

Tishkov was buried at the Danilovsky Cemetery in Moscow.

== Honours ==
- Soviet Top League bronze: 1988, 1991
- Russian Premier League: runner-up 1994; bronze 1993, 1997
- Russian Cup: 1993, 1995; finalist: 1997
- Soviet Cup finalist: 1991
