= Valeri Masalitin =

Russian footballer

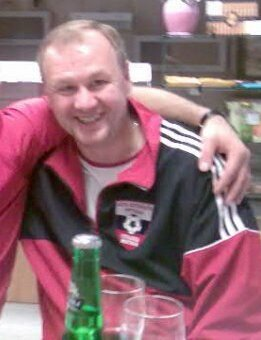

Personal information
- Full name: Valeri Nikolayevich Masalitin
- Date of birth: 27 September 1966 (age 60)
- Place of birth: Belgorod, Russian SFSR
- Height: 1.89 m (6 ft 2 1/2 in)
- Position: Striker

Youth career
- FC Salyut Belgorod

Senior career*
| Years | Team | Apps | (Gls) |
| 1983–1984 | FC Salyut Belgorod | 31 | (12) |
| 1985–1987 | FC SKA Rostov-on-Don | 58 | (19) |
| 1987–1989 | PFC CSKA Moscow | 87 | (53) |
| 1990 | Vitesse Arnhem | 5 | (0) |
| 1990–1992 | PFC CSKA Moscow | 34 | (19) |
| 1992 | Beerschot | | |
| 1992 | CD Badajoz | 3 | (5) |
| 1992 | SK Sigma Olomouc | 2 | (0) |
| 1993 | PFC CSKA Moscow | 13 | (1) |
| 1994–1995 | FC Spartak Moscow | 7 | (5) |
| 1996 | FC Chernomorets Novorossiysk | 21 | (5) |
| 1997–1998 | Köpetdag Aşgabat | | |
| 1999 | FC SKA Rostov-on-Don | 11 | (10) |
| 2000 | FC Nika Moscow | | |
| 2001 | FC Salyut-Energia Belgorod | 34 | (23) |
| 2002 | FC Terek Grozny | 2 | (0) |
- * Club domestic league appearances and goals

Valeri Nikolayevich Masalitin (Russian: Валерий Николаевич Масалитин; born 27 September 1966) is a Russia former professional footballer.

== Club career ==
He made his debut in the Soviet Second League in 1983 for FC Salyut Belgorod.

He scored 5 goals in one game, which is a joint record of the Soviet Top League (in 1990 for PFC CSKA Moscow in a game against FC Rotor Volgograd).

== Honours ==
- Soviet Top League champion: 1991.
- Soviet Top League runner-up: 1990.
- Soviet Cup winner: 1991.
- Soviet Cup finalist: 1992.
- Russian Cup winner: 1994.
- Russian Cup finalist: 1993, 1994 (played in the early stages of the 1993/94 tournament for PFC CSKA Moscow who lost in the final to FC Spartak Moscow, his team at the time).
- Russian Premier League champion: 1994.
- Russian Premier League bronze: 1995.
- Turkmenistan Higher League champion: 1998.

== European club competitions ==
- European Cup Winners' Cup 1991–92 for PFC CSKA Moscow: 2 games.
- UEFA Champions League 1993–94 with FC Spartak Moscow: 1 game.
