= Oleg Sergeyev =

Russian footballer

Personal information
- Full name: Oleg Vyacheslavovich Sergeyev
- Date of birth: 29 March 1968 (age 58)
- Place of birth: Volgograd, Russian SFSR
- Height: 1.78 m (5 ft 10 in)
- Position: Striker

Youth career
- ShISP Volgograd

Senior career*
Years	Team	Apps	(Gls)
1985–1988	FC Rotor Volgograd	81	(16)
1989–1996	PFC CSKA Moscow	154	(43)
1995	→ Al-Ittihad (loan)		
1996	FC Alania Vladikavkaz	13	(2)
1997	FC Dynamo Moscow	1	(0)
1998	FC Metallurg Lipetsk	19	(6)
1998	FC Lokomotiv Moscow	1	(0)
1999–2000	FC Torpedo-ZIL Moscow	39	(12)
2001	FC Baltika Kaliningrad	22	(7)
2002	FC Presnya Moscow		
2002–2004	FC Salyut-Energia Belgorod	63	(9)

International career
1991	USSR	3	(0)
1992	CIS	4	(1)
1993	Russia	3	(1)

Managerial career
- 2005: FC Salyut-Energiya Belgorod (assistant)
- 2006: FC SKA Rostov-on-Don (assistant)
- 2007: FC Nika Krasny Sulin (assistant)
- 2008: FC Nika Krasny Sulin
- 2009–2010: FC Avangard Kursk (assistant)
- 2010: FC Avangard Kursk (caretaker)
- 2011–2012: FC Salyut Belgorod (assistant)
- 2012–2013: FC Lokomotiv-2 Moscow (assistant)
- 2014–2015: FK Vardar (assistant)
- 2017: FC Rotor Volgograd (assistant)
- 2018–2019: FC Khimki (assistant)
- 2019–2020: FC Salyut Belgorod
- 2020: FC Dynamo Bryansk (assistant)
- 2020–2021: FC Salyut Belgorod
- 2023–2024: FC Rotor Volgograd (assistant)
- 2024: FC Rotor Volgograd
- 2024–2026: FC Dynamo Barnaul
- * Club domestic league appearances and goals

Oleg Vyacheslavovich Sergeyev (Russian: Олег Вячеславович Сергеев; born 29 March 1968) is a Russian football coach and a former player.

== Honours ==
PFC CSKA Moscow

- Soviet Premier League winner: 1991.
- Soviet Premier League runner-up: 1990.
- Russian Premier League runner-up: 1996.
- Soviet Cup winner: 1991.
- Soviet Cup runner-up: 1992.
- Russian Cup runner-up: 1993, 1994, 1997.

== International career ==
Sergeyev made his debut for USSR on 23 May 1991 in a friendly against Argentina. He scored both of his national team goals in friendlies against the United States: for CIS on 2 February 1992 and for Russia on 13 February 1993. He was not selected for the UEFA Euro 1992 squad.
