= 1993–94 Russian Cup =

Tournament details
- Country: Russia

Final positions
- Champions: Spartak Moscow
- Runners-up: CSKA

The 1993–94 Russian Cup was the second season of the Russian football knockout tournament since the dissolution of Soviet Union.

Russian Premier League team FC Luch Vladivostok did not participate.

== First round ==
Team 1	Score	Team 2
18 April 1993
Urartu Grozny	1–2	Terek Grozny
Avtodor-Olaf Vladikavkaz	w/o	Erzu Grozny
Kavkazkabel Prokhladny	3–0	Anzhi Makhachkala
Avtozapchast Baksan	1–2	Spartak Nalchik
Druzhba Budyonnovsk	1–0	Asmaral Kislovodsk
Beshtau Lermontov	1–0 (a.e.t.)	Nart Cherkessk
Torpedo Armavir	2–2 (a.e.t.) (3–0 p)	Kolos Krasnodar
Mashuk Pyatigorsk	1–1 (a.e.t.) (7–6 p)	Sherstyanik Nevinnomyssk
Venets Gulkevichi	1–2	Druzhba Maykop
Khimik Belorechensk	3–1	Kuban Krasnodar
Kuban Barannikovskiy	1–2	Gekris Novorossiysk
Niva Slavyansk-na-Kubani	1–2	Spartak Anapa
Shakhtyor Shakhty	1–0	Rostselmash Rostov-on-Don (reserves)
SKA Rostov-on-Don	0–1	APK Azov
Metallurg Krasny Sulin	2–0	Torpedo Taganrog
Salyut Belgorod	0–2	Fakel Voronezh
Avangard Kursk	2–1	FC Oryol
Arsenal Tula	1–0	Metallurg Lipetsk
SUO Moscow	2–4	Oka Kolomna
Turbostroitel Kaluga	2–1	Lokomotiv Moscow (reserves)
Trion-Volga Tver	w/o	Kosmos-Kirovets Saint Petersburg
FC Gatchina	0–2	Smena-Saturn Saint Petersburg
Lokomotiv Saint Petersburg	0–2	Zenit Saint Petersburg
Prometey-Dynamo Saint Petersburg	1–0 (a.e.t.)	Dynamo Vologda
Progress Chernyakhovsk	0–1	Baltika Kaliningrad
Mashinostroitel Pskov	1–0	Iskra Smolensk
Spartak Kostroma	0–1	Tekstilshchik Ivanovo
Volochanin Vyshny Volochyok	w/o	Bulat Cherepovets
Saturn Ramenskoye	0–3	Znamya Truda Orekhovo-Zuyevo
Dynamo Moscow (reserves)	0–3	Mosenergo Moscow
Torpedo-MKB Mytishchi	3–2	CSKA-2 Moscow
Torgmash Lyubertsy	1–0 (a.e.t.)	Titan Reutov
Viktor-Avangard Kolomna	4–3 (a.e.t.)	Spartak Moscow (reserves)
Asmaral Moscow (reserves)	1–0 (a.e.t.)	Interros Moskovsky
Torpedo Moscow (reserves)	1–3	Dynamo-2 Moscow
CSKA Moscow (reserves)	8–1	Kosmos-Kvest Dolgoprudny
Torpedo Pavlovo	0–2 (a.e.t.)	Khimik Dzerzhinsk
Torpedo Arzamas	2–0	Svetotekhnika Saransk
Sputnik Kimry	2–3	Torpedo Vladimir
Vympel Rybinsk	2–2 (a.e.t.) (5–3 p)	Shinnik Yaroslavl
Irgiz Balakovo	1–0	Lada-Tolyatti
Zarya Krotovka	2–1	Zenit Penza
Saranskeksport Saransk	2–0	Torpedo Ryazan
Tekstilshchik Isheyevka	1–0	Lada Dimitrovgrad
Zvezda-Rus Gorodishche	0–1	Sokol Saratov
Rotor Volgograd (reserves)	2–1	Avangard Kamyshin
Atommash Volgodonsk	0–1	Torpedo Volzhsky
Astrateks Astrakhan	2–2 (a.e.t.) (3–2 p)	Volgar Astrakhan
Vyatka Kirov	2–2 (a.e.t.) (4–3 p)	Gornyak Kachkanar
Azamat Cheboksary	1–2	Neftekhimik Nizhnekamsk
Elektron Vyatskiye Polyany	0–0 (a.e.t.) (4–3 p)	Druzhba Yoshkar-Ola
KamAZavtotsentr Naberezhnye Chelny	1–0	Rubin-TAN Kazan
Energiya Chaykovsky	1–0	Torpedo Izhevsk
KDS Samrau Ufa	1–0	Torpedo Miass
Devon Oktyabrsky	1–0 (a.e.t.)	Sodovik Sterlitamak
Metallurg Novotroitsk	1–0 (a.e.t.)	Metallurg Magnitogorsk
Gazovik Izhevsk	2–1 (a.e.t.)	Zvezda Perm
Uralets Nizhny Tagil	3–2	Zenit Izhevsk
2 May 1993
Dynamo-Gazovik Tyumen	4–0	Tom Tomsk
Chkalovets Novosibirsk	1–2	Metallurg Novokuznetsk
Kuzbass Kemerovo	2–1	Selenga Ulan-Ude
Metallurg Krasnoyarsk	2–1	Zvezda-Yunis-Sib Irkutsk

== Second round ==
Team 1	Score	Team 2
7 May 1993
Gazovik Izhevsk	1–3	Uralets Nizhny Tagil
8 May 1993
Terek Grozny	w/o	Avtodor-Olaf Vladikavkaz
Spartak Nalchik	4–3	Kavkazkabel Prokhladny
Beshtau Lermontov	1–1 (a.e.t.) (3–2 p)	Druzhba Budyonnovsk
Mashuk Pyatigorsk	2–1	Torpedo Armavir
Druzhba Maykop	2–1	Khimik Belorechensk
Gekris Novorossiysk	1–0	Spartak Anapa
APK Azov	3–0	Shakhtyor Shakhty
Fakel Voronezh	2–0	Metallurg Krasny Sulin
Arsenal Tula	6–0	Avangard Kursk
Oka Kolomna	2–3 (a.e.t.)	Turbostroitel Kaluga
Smena-Saturn Saint Petersburg	3–1	Trion-Volga Tver
Zenit Saint Petersburg	7–1	Prometey-Dynamo Saint Petersburg
Baltika Kaliningrad	1–0	Mashinostroitel Pskov
Tekstilshchik Ivanovo	0–1	Bulat Cherepovets
Znamya Truda Orekhovo-Zuyevo	0–0 (a.e.t.) (5–6 p)	Mosenergo Moscow
Torpedo-MKB Mytishchi	1–0	Torgmash Lyubertsy
Viktor-Avangard Kolomna	4–2 (a.e.t.)	Asmaral Moscow (reserves)
Dynamo-2 Moscow	0–3	CSKA Moscow (reserves)
Khimik Dzerzhinsk	1–3	Torpedo Arzamas
Torpedo Vladimir	2–3 (a.e.t.)	Vympel Rybinsk
Irgiz Balakovo	5–1	Zarya Krotovka
Saranskeksport Saransk	0–1	Tekstilshchik Isheyevka
Sokol Saratov	3–1	Rotor Volgograd (reserves)
Torpedo Volzhsky	6–0	Astrateks Astrakhan
Neftekhimik Nizhnekamsk	2–1	Vyatka Kirov
Elektron Vyatskiye Polyany	0–1	KamAZavtotsentr Naberezhnye Chelny
KDS Samrau Ufa	2–0	Energiya Chaykovsky
Metallurg Novotroitsk	4–0	Devon Oktyabrsky
23 May 1993
Metallurg Novokuznetsk	0–2	Dynamo-Gazovik Tyumen
Metallurg Krasnoyarsk	w/o	Kuzbass Kemerovo

== Third round ==
Russian Premier League team KAMAZ Naberezhnye Chelny started at this stage.

Team 1	Score	Team 2
28 May 1993
Spartak Nalchik	1–1 (a.e.t.) (3–5 p)	Terek Grozny
Beshtau Lermontov	2–0	Mashuk Pyatigorsk
Turbostroitel Kaluga	0–2	Arsenal Tula
Smena-Saturn Saint Petersburg	1–1 (a.e.t.) (4–1 p)	Zenit Saint Petersburg
Bulat Cherepovets	0–1	Baltika Kaliningrad
Mosenergo Moscow	2–0	Torpedo-MKB Mytishchi
CSKA Moscow (reserves)	0–2	Viktor-Avangard Kolomna
Torpedo Arzamas	1–1 (a.e.t.) (4–1 p)	Vympel Rybinsk
Tekstilshchik Isheyevka	1–1 (a.e.t.) (4–5 p)	Irgiz Balakovo
Torpedo Volzhsky	2–1	Sokol Saratov
Neftekhimik Nizhnekamsk	2–0	KamAZavtotsentr Naberezhnye Chelny
Metallurg Novotroitsk	4–0	KDS Samrau Ufa

28 May 1993	Uralets Nizhny Tagil	0–1	KAMAZ Naberezhnye Chelny	Nizhny Tagil
			Panchenko 89'	Stadium: Uralets Stadium; Attendance: 1,000; Referee: Gennadi Kulichenkov (Tula)

Team 1	Score	Team 2
14 June 1993
Dynamo-Gazovik Tyumen	1–2	Metallurg Krasnoyarsk
16 June 1993
Gekris Novorossiysk	4–1	Druzhba Maykop
28 June 1993
Fakel Voronezh	w/o	APK Azov

== Round of 32 ==
All the other Russian Premier League teams started at this stage.

3 July 1993	KAMAZ Naberezhnye Chelny	2–0	Uralmash Yekaterinburg	Naberezhnye Chelny
	Sakhno 24'; Kovalyov 75'			Stadium: KAMAZ stadium Attendance: 12,000; Referee: Lom-Ali Ibragimov (Grozny)

5 July 1993	Terek Grozny	5–6	Spartak Vladikavkaz	Proletarsk
	Neduyev 5'; Diniyev 40', 74'; Sushiy 44'; Akhmetov 79' (pen.)		Suleymanov 21', 36'; Yanovskiy 34'; Meleshko 47'; Ostayev 59'; Suanov 71'	Stadium: Urozhai Stadium; Attendance: 500; Referee: Viktor Yarygin (Volgograd)

5 July 1993	Beshtau Lermontov	2–0	Dynamo Stavropol	Lermontov
	Shevtsov 50'; Troyan 59'			Stadium: Beshtau Stadium; Attendance: 3,000; Referee: Nikolai Fyodorov (Voronezh)

5 July 1993	Gekris Novorossiysk	1–1 (a.e.t.) (4–3 p)	Zhemchuzhina Sochi	Novorossiysk
	Sarkisov 29' (pen.)		Gogrichiani 20'	Stadium: Trud Stadium; Attendance: 9,500; Referee: Viktor Gavrin (Rostov-on-Don)
	Penalties
	Pirogov (penalty scored); Podgurskiy (penalty scored); Yepiskoposyan (penalty scored); Sarkisov (penalty scored); Berezner (penalty missed)		(penalty scored) Pocheptsov; (penalty scored) Murygin; (penalty scored) Titov; (penalty missed) Megamadov; (penalty missed) Fyodorov

5 July 1993	Fakel Voronezh	0–1	Rostselmash Rostov-on-Don	Voronezh
			Tikhonov 15'	Stadium: Tsentralnyi Profsoyuz Stadion; Attendance: 6,000; Referee: Anatoli Kiselyov (Moscow)

5 July 1993	Arsenal Tula	1–2	Lokomotiv Moscow	Tula
	Kurakov 30'		Smirnov 10'; Mukhamadiev 46'	Stadium: Central Lenin Stadium; Attendance: 9,000; Referee: Sergei Martynkin (Ryazan)

5 July 1993	Smena-Saturn Saint Petersburg	1–0	Torpedo Moscow	Saint Petersburg
	Korolyov 74'			Stadium: Smena Stadium; Attendance: 6,000; Referee: Nikolai Miloserdov (Saratov)

5 July 1993	Baltika Kaliningrad	0–1	CSKA Moscow	Kaliningrad
			Dudnyk 36'	Stadium: Baltika Stadium; Attendance: 17,000; Referee: Sergey Lapochkin (Saint Petersburg)

5 July 1993	Mosenergo Moscow	1–2	Asmaral Moscow	Moscow
	Shebarshin 78'		Golikov 53'; Panfyorov 65'	Stadium: Krasny Oktyabr Stadium; Attendance: 1,000; Referee: Sergei Frantsuzov (Moscow)

5 July 1993	Viktor-Avangard Kolomna	0–2	Dynamo Moscow	Kolomna
	Chunikhin (red card)		Selezov 67'; Derkach 87'	Stadium: Avangard Stadium; Attendance: 10,000; Referee: Igor Rutskoy (Belgorod)

5 July 1993	Torpedo Arzamas	2–2 (a.e.t.) (5–4 p)	Lokomotiv Nizhny Novgorod	Arzamas
	S. Kornev 23', 74'		Rydny 43', 62'	Stadium: Torpedo Stadium; Attendance: 6,000; Referee: Vyacheslav Sorokin (Moscow)
	Penalties
	Litvinov (penalty scored); Borovikov (penalty scored); S. Kornev (penalty scored); O. Krivosheyev (penalty scored); Novikov (penalty scored)		(penalty scored) Rumyantsev; (penalty scored) Oskolkov; (penalty scored) Gerasimov; (penalty scored) Rydny; (penalty missed) Kurayev

5 July 1993	Irgiz Balakovo	1–0	Tekstilshchik Kamyshin	Balakovo
	Kharin 34'			Stadium: Trud Stadium; Attendance: 5,500; Referee: Sergei Isakov (Nizhny Tagil)

5 July 1993	Torpedo Volzhsky	0–2	Rotor Volgograd	Volzhsky
			Niederhaus 41'; Veretennikov 63'	Stadium: Loginov Stadium; Attendance: 5,500; Referee: Valentin Ivanov (Moscow)

5 July 1993	Neftekhimik Nizhnekamsk	0–5	Spartak Moscow	Nizhnekamsk
			Pisarev 24'; Lediakhov 29'; Karpin 47'; Cherenkov 76', 85'	Stadium: Druzhba Stadium; Attendance: 10,000; Referee: Igor Novokshchenov (Volgograd)

5 July 1993	Metallurg Novotroitsk	0–0 (a.e.t.) (4–3 p)	Krylia Sovetov Samara	Novotroitsk
			Kharlachyov (red card)	Stadium: Metallurg Stadium; Attendance: 10,000; Referee: Sergei Gusev (Tobolsk)
	Penalties
	Derkach (penalty scored); Trizna (penalty scored); Yevsin (penalty scored); Safonov (penalty missed); V. Popov (penalty missed); Burakov (penalty scored)		(penalty scored) Filippov; (penalty scored) Remezov; (penalty scored) Makeyev; (penalty missed) Marushko; (penalty missed) Kharlachyov; (penalty missed) Avalyan

5 July 1993	Metallurg Krasnoyarsk	3–1	Okean Nakhodka	Krasnoyarsk
	Makarov 55'; Alekseyev 58', 64'		Kokarev 65'	Stadium: Central Stadium; Attendance: 7,500; Referee: Vyacheslav Matushevskiy (Irkutsk)

== Round of 16 ==
17 July 1993	Dynamo Moscow	2–0	Torpedo Arzamas	Moscow
	Rybakov 59', 83'			Stadium: Dynamo Stadium; Attendance: 2,000; Referee: Sergey Lapochkin (Saint Petersburg)

17 July 1993	Rotor Volgograd	5–0	Irgiz Balakovo	Volgograd
	Veretennikov 17'; Niederhaus 34', 61'; Nechayev 68'; Kuznetsov 78'			Stadium: Central Stadium; Attendance: 6,000; Referee: Valentin Ivanov, Moscow

1 August 1993	Spartak Vladikavkaz	6–0	Beshtau Lermontov	Vladikavkaz
	Dzoblayev 1'; Pimenov 10', 25'; Suleymanov 34'; Markhel 36'; Meleshko 71' (pen.)			Stadium: Republican Spartak Stadium; Attendance: 10,000; Referee: Sergei Atanov (Taganrog)

1 August 1993	Asmaral Moscow	1–2	CSKA Moscow	Moscow
	Panfyorov 72'		Mashkarin 65'; Grishin 84'	Stadium: Krasnaya Presnya Stadium; Attendance: 1,500; Referee: Vyacheslav Sorokin (Moscow)

2 August 1993	Rostselmash Rostov-on-Don	1–2	Gekris Novorossiysk	Rostov-on-Don
	Borodkin 5'		Berezner 23'; Burdin 83'	Stadium: Rostselmash Stadium; Attendance: 3,000; Referee: Gennadi Yarygin (Yoshkar-Ola)

2 August 1993	Lokomotiv Moscow	2–1 (a.e.t.)	Smena-Saturn Saint Petersburg	Moscow
	Garin 106'; Smirnov 115'		Lapushkin 119'	Stadium: Lokomotiv Stadium; Attendance: 1,500; Referee: Igor Novokshchenov (Volgograd)

2 August 1993	KAMAZ Naberezhnye Chelny	6–0	Metallurg Krasnoyarsk	Naberezhnye Chelny
	Panchenko 16', 64'; Fakhrutdinov 28', 40', 71', 82'			Stadium: KAMAZ stadium Attendance: 9,500; Referee: Sergei Leonov (Barnaul)

14 August 1993	Spartak Moscow	5–0	Metallurg Novotroitsk	Moscow
	Pisarev 34'; Cherenkov 39'; Radchenko 49', 70'; Piatnitski 59'			Stadium: Dynamo Stadium; Attendance: 3,000; Referee: Aleksandr Lapin (Ufa)

== Quarter-finals ==
13 April 1994	Chernomorets Novorossiysk (Note: FC Gekris Novorossiysk was changed their name to FC Chernomorets Novorossiysk during the winter break.)	0–2	Spartak Vladikavkaz	Novorossiysk
			Qosimov 15'; Dzoblayev 77'	Stadium: Trud Stadium; Attendance: 10,150; Referee: Sergei Anokhin (Moscow)

13 April 1994	Lokomotiv Moscow	2–2 (a.e.t.) (3–4 p)	CSKA Moscow	Moscow
	Rakhimov 56'; Kosolapov 106'		Bystrov 8'; Grishin 104'	Stadium: Lokomotiv Stadium; Attendance: 5,250; Referee: Anatoli Malyarov (Moscow)
	Penalties
	Kosolapov (penalty scored); Rakhimov (penalty scored); Garin (penalty scored); Podpaly (penalty missed); Nikulkin (penalty missed); Hovhannisyan (penalty missed)		(penalty scored) Grishin; (penalty missed) Broshin; (penalty missed) Bavykin; (penalty scored) Bushmanov; (penalty scored) Ivanov; (penalty scored) Fayzulin

13 April 1994	Rotor Volgograd	0–1	Dynamo Moscow	Volgograd
			Simutenkov 47'	Stadium: Central Stadium; Attendance: 11,000; Referee: Igor Siner (Omsk)

23 April 1994	KAMAZ Naberezhnye Chelny	1–3	Spartak Moscow	Naberezhnye Chelny
	Yaremchuk 59'		Piatnitski 43'; Karpin 45' (pen.), 82'	Stadium: KAMAZ stadium Attendance: 18,000; Referee: Gennadi Kulichenkov (Tula)

== Semi-finals ==
6 May 1994	Dynamo Moscow	0–1	Spartak Moscow	Moscow
			Beschastnykh 39'; Ternavski (red card) 5'	Stadium: Dynamo Stadium; Attendance: 19,500; Referee: Sergei Khusainov (Moscow)

7 May 1994	CSKA Moscow	1–1 (a.e.t.) (5–3 p)	Spartak Vladikavkaz	Moscow
	Gushchin 61'		Tedeyev 80'	Stadium: Dynamo Stadium; Attendance: 7,500; Referee: Yuri Chebotaryov (Krasnodar)
	Penalties
	Grishin (penalty scored); Bushmanov (penalty scored); Mashkarin (penalty scored); Bystrov (penalty scored); Fayzulin (penalty scored)		(penalty scored) Gazdanov; (penalty scored) Qosimov; (penalty scored) Tedeyev; (penalty missed) Denisov

== Final ==
22 May 1994

Spartak Moscow	2–2 (a.e.t.)	CSKA Moscow
Lediakhov 6'; Karpin 11'		Radimov 39'; Bystrov 58'
Penalties
Lediakhov (penalty scored); Onopko (penalty scored); Ternavski (penalty scored); Alenichev (penalty scored)	4–2	(penalty scored) Grishin; (penalty missed) Bushmanov; (penalty missed) Kupriyanov; (penalty scored) Bystrov

Luzhniki Stadium, Moscow
Attendance: 30,000
Referee: Sergei Anokhin (Moscow)

FC Spartak Moscow	PFC CSKA Moscow

FC Spartak Moscow:
GK	(Lithuania) Gintaras Staučė
DF	(Russia) Ramiz Mamedov (substituted off) 63'
DF	(Russia) Dmitri Khlestov
MF	(Russia) Ilya Tsymbalar
DF	(Russia) Vladislav Ternavski
DF	(Russia) Yuri Nikiforov (substituted off) 118'
MF	(Russia) Viktor Onopko
MF	(Russia) Valeri Karpin (substituted off) 104'
MF	(Russia) Andrei Piatnitski
MF	(Russia) Igor Lediakhov
FW	(Russia) Vladimir Beschastnykh
Substitutes:
FW	(Russia) Valeri Masalitin (substituted on) 63'
DF	(Russia) Sergei Chudin (substituted on) 118'
MF	(Russia) Dmitri Alenichev (substituted on) 104'
GK	(Ukraine) Oleksandr Pomazun
MF	(Ukraine) Yuri Sak
MF	(Russia) Andrei Tikhonov
Manager:
(Russia) Oleg Romantsev

PFC CSKA Moscow:
GK	(Russia) Yevgeni Plotnikov
DF	(Russia) Aleksei Gushchin
DF	(Russia) Mikhail Kupriyanov
DF	(Russia) Dmitri Bystrov
MF	(Russia) Vasili Ivanov
DF	(Russia) Yevgeni Bushmanov
MF	(Belarus) Yuri Antonovich
MF	(Russia) Denis Mashkarin
MF	(Russia) Vladislav Radimov (substituted off) 106'
FW	(Russia) Vladimir Tatarchuk (substituted off) 46'
FW	(Russia) Ilshat Faizulin (substituted off) 82'
Substitutes:
MF	(Russia) Aleksandr Grishin (substituted on) 106'
MF	(Russia) Valeri Broshin (substituted on) 46'
DF	(Russia) Aleksei Bobrov (substituted on) 82'
GK	(Russia) Aleksandr Guteyev
DF	(Russia) Vladislav Lemish
Manager:
(Russia) Boris Kopeikin

MATCH RULES

- 90 minutes.
- 30 minutes of extra-time if necessary.
- Penalty shootout if scores still level.
- Seven named substitutes
- Maximum of 3 substitutions.

Played in the earlier stages, but were not on the final game squad:

FC Spartak Moscow: Dimitri Ananko (DF), Andrei Ivanov (DF), Valery Kechinov (MF), Nikolai Pisarev (FW), Dmitri Radchenko (FW), Sergey Rodionov (FW), Fyodor Cherenkov (FW).

PFC CSKA Moscow: Yervand Krbachyan (DF), Oleg Malyukov (DF), Sergei Mamchur (DF), Sergei Kolotovkin (DF), Dmitri Shoukov (MF), Dmitri Karsakov (MF), Yuri Bavykin (MF), Yuri Dudnyk (MF), Leonid Markevich (MF), Dmitri Khokhlov (MF), Oleg Sergeyev (FW), Aleksei Bychkov (FW), Valeri Masalitin (FW, played for Spartak in the final).
