= 1994 PFC CSKA Moscow season =

CSKA
1994 season
- Manager: Boris Kopeikin
- Stadium: Dynamo Stadium; Eduard Streltsov Stadium; Grigory Fedotov Stadium; Luzhniki Stadium
- Top League: 10th
- Russian Cup: Runners-Up
- Russian Cup: Round of 16 vs Torpedo Moscow
- UEFA Cup Winners' Cup: First round vs Ferencváros
- Top goalscorer: League: Two Players (5); All: Oleg Sergeyev (8)

The 1994 CSKA season was the club's third season in the Russian Top League, the highest tier of association football in Russia.

== Squad ==
As of match played 9 November 1994

| Name | Nationality | Position | Date of birth (age) | Signed from | Signed in | Contract ends | Apps. | Goals |
Goalkeepers
| Andrei Novosadov | (Russia) | GK | 27 March 1972 (aged 22) | KAMAZ | 1993 | | 11 | 0 |
| Yevgeni Plotnikov | (Russia) | GK | 6 September 1972 (aged 22) | Kuban Krasnodar | 1993 | | 54 | 0 |
Defenders
| Yevgeni Bushmanov | (Russia) | DF | 2 November 1971 (aged 23) | Spartak Moscow | 1992 | | 81 | 4 |
| Dmitri Bystrov | (Russia) | DF | 30 July 1967 (aged 27) | Lokomotiv Moscow | 1986 | | 64 | 5 |
| Aleksei Guschin | (Russia) | DF | 21 October 1971 (aged 23) | Trainee | 1989 | | 79 | 2 |
| Sergei Kolotovkin | (Russia) | DF | 28 September 1965 (aged 29) | Hapoel Tzafririm Holon | 1994 | | 62 | 0 |
| Sergei Mamchur | (Russia) | DF | 3 February 1972 (aged 22) | Asmaral Moscow | 1993 | | 60 | 1 |
| Valeri Minko | (Russia) | DF | 8 August 1971 (aged 23) | Dynamo Barnaul | 1989 | | 75 | 8 |
| Dmitri Shirshakov | (Russia) | DF | 14 November 1973 (aged 20) | Trainee | 1992 | | 2 | 0 |
| Mikhail Sinyov | (Russia) | DF | 21 June 1972 (aged 22) | KAMAZ Naberezhnye Chelny | 1994 | | 11 | 0 |
Midfielders
| Yuri Antonovich | (Belarus) | MF | 2 June 1967 (aged 27) | Dinamo Minsk | 1993 | | 66 | 5 |
| Aleksandr Grishin | (Russia) | MF | 18 November 1971 (aged 22) | Lokomotiv Moscow | 1989 | | 80 | 24 |
| Vasili Ivanov | (Russia) | MF | 21 March 1970 (aged 24) | Zenit St.Petersburg | 1990 | | 74 | 6 |
| Dmitri Khokhlov | (Russia) | MF | 22 December 1975 (aged 18) | Trainee | 1992 | | 3 | 0 |
| Denis Mashkarin | (Russia) | MF | 17 May 1973 (aged 21) | Zenit St.Petersburg | 1992 | | 88 | 6 |
| Vladislav Radimov | (Russia) | MF | 26 November 1975 (aged 18) | Smena-Saturn Saint Petersburg | 1992 | | 36 | 7 |
| Sergei Semak | (Russia) | MF | 27 February 1976 (aged 18) | Asmaral Moscow | 1994 | | 8 | 2 |
| Vladimir Semyonov | (Russia) | MF | 25 June 1972 (aged 22) | Zarya Leninsk-Kuznetsky | 1993 | | 8 | 0 |
| Dmitri Shoukov | (Russia) | MF | 26 September 1975 (aged 19) | Trainee | 1993 | | 28 | 1 |
| Vladimir Tatarchuk | (Russia) | MF | 25 April 1966 (aged 28) | Slavia Prague | 1994 | | 11 | 0 |
| Valeri Broshin | (Russia) | MF | 19 October 1962 (aged 32) | CD Badajoz | 1993 | | 34 | 5 |
Forwards
| Ilshat Faizulin | (Russia) | FW | 5 March 1973 (aged 21) | Trainee | 1989 | | 108 | 22 |
| Oleg Sergeyev | (Russia) | FW | 29 March 1968 (aged 26) | Rotor Volgograd | 1989 | | 86 | 26 |
Left During the Season
| Aleksandr Guteyev | (Russia) | GK | 18 June 1967 (aged 27) | Torpedo Moscow | 1988 | | 21 | 0 |
| Yervand Krbachyan | (Armenia) | DF | 1 October 1971 (aged 23) | Ararat Yerevan | 1993 | | 13 | 0 |
| Yuri Bavykin | (Russia) | DF | 31 March 1973 (aged 21) | Lada-Togliatti | 1994 | | 28 | 1 |
| Mikhail Kupriyanov | (Russia) | DF | 7 July 1973 (aged 21) | SKA Rostov-on-Don | 1993 | | 24 | 0 |
| Aleksei Bobrov | (Russia) | MF | 27 March 1972 (aged 22) | Lada-Togliatti | 1994 | | 7 | 0 |
| Vladislav Lemish | (Azerbaijan) | FW | 20 August 1970 (aged 24) | Espanyol | 1994 | | 5 | 0 |
| Aleksei Bychkov | (Russia) | FW | 8 November 1972 (aged 22) | Shinnik Yaroslavl | 1994 | | 3 | 0 |
| Andriy Demchenko | (Russia) | FW | 20 August 1976 (aged 18) | Trainee | 1992 | | 2 | 0 |
| Vyacheslav Melnikov | (Russia) | FW | 12 March 1975 (aged 19) | Chernomorets Novorossiysk | 1992 | | 1 | 0 |

== Transfers ==
In: Note: Flags indicate national team as defined under FIFA eligibility rules; some limited exceptions apply. Players may hold more than one non-FIFA nationality.

| No. | Pos. | Nation | Player |
|---|---|---|---|
| — | DF | RUS | Sergei Kolotovkin (from (Israel) Hapoel Tzafririm Holon) |
| — | DF | RUS | Mikhail Sinyov (from (Russia) KAMAZ Naberezhnye Chelny) |
| — | MF | RUS | Aleksei Bobrov (from (Russia) Lada-Togliatti) |
| — | MF | RUS | Sergei Semak (from (Russia) Asmaral Moscow) |
| — | MF | RUS | Vladimir Tatarchuk (from (Czech Republic) Slavia Prague) |
| — | FW | AZE | Vladislav Lemish (from (Spain) Espanyol) |

Out: Note: Flags indicate national team as defined under FIFA eligibility rules; some limited exceptions apply. Players may hold more than one non-FIFA nationality.

| No. | Pos. | Nation | Player |
|---|---|---|---|
| — | MF | RUS | Aleksei Bobrov (to (Russia) Lada-Togliatti) |
| — | MF | RUS | Dmitri Karsakov (to (Russia) Dynamo Moscow) |
| — | MF | RUS | Mikhail Kolesnikov (to (Russia) Spartak Moscow) |
| — | MF | UKR | Yuriy Dudnyk (to (Ukraine) Metalurh Zaporizhya) |
| — | FW | AZE | Vladislav Lemish (to (Russia) Rostselmash) |
| — | FW | RUS | Aleksei Bychkov (to (Russia) Shinnik Yaroslavl) |
| — | FW | RUS | Andriy Demchenko (to (Ukraine) Viktor Zaporizhzhia) |
| — | FW | RUS | Leonid Markevich (to (Russia) Sokol Saratov) |
| — | FW | RUS | Valeri Masalitin (to (Russia) Spartak Moscow) |
| — | FW | RUS | Vyacheslav Melnikov (to (Israel) Hapoel Haifa) |
| — | FW | RUS | Roman Oreshchuk (to (Russia) Chernomorets Novorossiysk) |

== Competitions ==
=== Top League ===
==== Results by round ====
| Round | 1 | 2 | 3 | 4 | 5 | 6 | 7 | 8 | 9 | 10 | 11 | 12 | 13 | 14 | 15 | 16 | 17 | 18 | 19 | 20 | 21 | 22 | 23 | 24 | 25 | 26 | 27 | 28 | 29 | 30 |
|---|---|---|---|---|---|---|---|---|---|---|---|---|---|---|---|---|---|---|---|---|---|---|---|---|---|---|---|---|---|---|
| Ground | H | A | A | A | A | H | H | H | A | H | A | H | A | H | H | A | A | H | A | H | A | A | H | H | A | H | A | H | A | H |
| Result | W | L | W | L | L | D | D | W | L | L | D | D | L | D | D | W | L | W | L | D | D | L | L | D | L | W | D | W | L | W |

Updated to match(es) played on 6 November 1994. Source: See Results
A = Away; H = Home; W = Win; D = Draw; L = Loss

==== Results ====
| 14 March 1994 1 | CSKA Moscow | 1 – 0 | KAMAZ Naberezhnye Chelny | Moscow |
| MSK (UTC+3) | Radimov 14' | Report | Puchkov (yellow card) 67'; Kobzev (yellow card) 85' | Stadium: Eduard Streltsov Stadium; Referee: I.Siner |

| 26 March 1994 2 | Uralmash Yekaterinburg | 2 – 0 | CSKA Moscow | Yekaterinburg |
| 13:00 MSK (UTC+3) | Perednya 26'; Galimov (yellow card) 32'; Khankeyev 66'; Ledovskikh (yellow card) 80'; Yushkov (red card) 84' | Report | Guschin (yellow card) 57' | Stadium: SKB-Bank Arena; Referee: A.Markelov |

| 29 March 1994 3 | Tyumen | 0 – 1 | CSKA Moscow | Tyumen |
| 16:00 MSK (UTC+4) | Naumov (yellow card) 40' | Report | Bavykin 31'; Faizulin (yellow card) 88' | Stadium: Geolog Stadium; Referee: G.Kulichenkov |

| 2 April 1994 4 | Torpedo Moscow | 1 – 0 | CSKA Moscow | Moscow |
| 18:00 MSK (UTC+4) | Afanasyev (yellow card) 32' (goal) 48'; Chumachenko (yellow card) 39'; Solovyov (yellow card) 52' | Report | Grishin (yellow card) 22'; Guschin (yellow card) 58' | Stadium: Eduard Streltsov Stadium; Referee: V.Ovchinnikov |

| 9 April 1994 5 | Alania Vladikavkaz | 2 – 1 | CSKA Moscow | Vladikavkaz |
| 15:00 MSK (UTC+4) | Asadov (yellow card) 33'; Dzoblayev 46'; Qosimov 63' (pen.); Pagayev (yellow card) 86'; Dzhioyev (yellow card) 87' | Report | Broshin 12' | Stadium: Republican Spartak Stadium; Referee: Nikolai Levnikov |

| 17 April 1994 6 | CSKA Moscow | 0 – 0 | Rotor Volgograd | Moscow |
| MSK (UTC+4) | Shoukov (yellow card) 88' | Report | | Stadium: Dynamo Stadium; Referee: Taras Bezubyak |

| 20 April 1994 7 | CSKA Moscow | 1 – 1 | Lokomotiv Nizhny Novgorod | Moscow |
| MSK (UTC+4) | Faizulin 16' | Report | Kazakov (yellow card) 49'; Moiseyev 50' | Stadium: Eduard Streltsov Stadium; Referee: Lom-Ali Ibragimov |

| 24 April 1994 8 | CSKA Moscow | 1 – 0 | Tekstilshchik Kamyshin | Moscow |
| MSK (UTC+4) | Grishin (yellow card) 42'; Antonovich (yellow card) 67'; Bushmanov 69' | Report | Minayev (red card) 59' | Stadium: Dynamo Stadium; Referee: Yuri Chebotaryov |

| 28 April 1994 9 | Zhemchuzhina-Sochi | 2 – 0 | CSKA Moscow | Sochi |
| MSK (UTC+4) | Filimonov 23' al-Khalifa 88' | Report | Mamchur (yellow card) 15' (red card) 46'; Ivanov (yellow card) 85' | Stadium: Sochi Central Stadium; Referee: Aleksandr Lapin |

| 2 May 1994 10 | CSKA Moscow | 1 – 2 | Lokomotiv Moscow | Moscow |
| MSK (UTC+4) | Radimov (yellow card) 29'; Antonovich 74' | Report | Leonchenko (yellow card) 23'; Arifullin (yellow card) 40'; Kharlachyov (yellow card) 67'; Perepadenko (yellow card) 85'; Yelyshev (yellow card) 86' | Stadium: Grigory Fedotov Stadium; Referee: Valentin Ivanov |

| 10 May 1994 11 | Dynamo Stavropol | 0 – 0 | CSKA Moscow | Stavropol |
| MSK (UTC+4) | Maslov (yellow card) 17'; Kopylov (yellow card) 58' | Report | Mashkarin (yellow card) 24'; Ivanov (yellow card) 34' | Stadium: Dynamo Stadium; Referee: Aleksandr Lapin |

| 14 May 1994 12 | CSKA Moscow | 0 – 0 | Lada-Togliatti | Moscow |
| MSK (UTC+4) | Mamchur (yellow card) 29'; Tatarchuk (yellow card) 54' | Report | Bavykin (yellow card) 10'; Gradilenko (yellow card) 50'; Valiyev (yellow card) 84' | Stadium: Luzhniki Stadium; Referee: A.Markelov |

| 18 May 1994 13 | Spartak Moscow | 2 – 0 | CSKA Moscow | Moscow |
| MSK (UTC+4) | Pyatnitsky 70'; Beschastnykh 83' | Report | Mamchur (yellow card) 26' | Stadium: Luzhniki Stadium; Referee: A.Budogosky |

| 26 May 1994 14 | CSKA Moscow | 1 – 1 | Krylia Sovetov | Moscow |
| MSK (UTC+4) | Grishin 64' (pen.); Bystrov (red card) 79' | Report | Zakharov (yellow card) 15'; Tsilyurik 66' (yellow card) 90' | Stadium: Luzhniki Stadium; Referee: Lom-Ali Ibragimov |

| 20 July 1994 15 | CSKA Moscow | 1 – 1 | Zhemchuzhina-Sochi | Moscow |
| MSK (UTC+4) | Ivanov (yellow card) 10' (goal) 67' | Report | Bozhko 3'; Novgorodov (yellow card) 15'; Ignatyev (yellow card) 43' | Stadium: Dynamo Stadium; Referee: G.Kulichenkov |

| 24 July 1994 16 | Dynamo Moscow | 2 – 4 | CSKA Moscow | Moscow |
| MSK (UTC+4) | Simutenkov (yellow card) 16' (goal) 64' (pen.); Tetradze 26'; Kovtun (yellow card) 29' | Report | Khidiyatullin 9' (o.g.); Minko 30' (pen.); Antonovich (yellow card) 33'; Faizulin 40'; Mamchur (yellow card) 46'; Radimov 49'; Plotnikov (yellow card) 63'; Broshin (yellow card) 82' | Stadium: Dynamo Stadium; Referee: V.Ovchinnikov |

| 28 July 1994 17 | Tekstilshchik Kamyshin | 2 – 1 | CSKA Moscow | Kamyshin |
| 18:00 MSK (UTC+4) | Natalushko 27' (pen.); Navochenko (yellow card) 29'; Tsygankov 65' | Report | Faizulin 68' | Stadium: Tekstilshchik Stadium; Referee: I.Siner |

| 3 August 1994 18 | CSKA Moscow | 3 – 1 | Dynamo Stavropol | Moscow |
| MSK (UTC+4) | Broshin 12', 63'; Minko 46' | Report | Korneyev 72' | Stadium: Dynamo Stadium; Referee: Taras Bezubyak |

| 9 August 1994 19 | Lokomotiv Moscow | 1 – 0 | CSKA Moscow | Moscow |
| MSK (UTC+4) | Yelyshev (yellow card) 12' (red card) 87' (goal) 30'; Ovchinnikov (yellow card) 90' | Report | Mamchur (yellow card) 78' | Stadium: Lokomotiv Stadium; Referee: V.Filippov |

| 15 August 1994 20 | CSKA Moscow | 1 – 1 | Spartak Moscow | Moscow |
| 13:00 MSK (UTC+4) | Bystrov 41' (pen.); Kolotovkin (yellow card) 90' | Report | Pyatnitsky (yellow card) 45'; Chudin (yellow card) 66' (goal) 78' | Stadium: Dynamo Stadium; Referee: A.Malyarov |

| 27 August 1994 21 | Krylia Sovetov | 1 – 1 | CSKA Moscow | Samara |
| MSK (UTC+4) | Delov (yellow card) 3'; Rezantsev (yellow card) 71'; Safronov 75' | Report | Bystrov 74' (pen.); Mamchur (yellow card) 80'; Grishin (yellow card) 83' | Stadium: Metallurg Stadium; Referee: Lom-Ali Ibragimov |

| 31 August 1994 22 | Lada-Togliatti | 1 – 0 | CSKA Moscow | Tolyatti |
| MSK (UTC+4) | Valiyev (penalty missed) 40'; Bakharev 74' | Report | Bystrov (yellow card) 70' | Stadium: Torpedo Stadium; Referee: Yuri Chebotaryov |

| 9 September 1994 23 | CSKA Moscow | 2 – 3 | Dynamo Moscow | Moscow |
| MSK (UTC+4) | Sinyov (yellow card) 9'; Antonovich 51'; Faizulin 86'; Bystrov (penalty missed) '89 | Report | Ivanov 3' (yellow card) 64'; Kovtun (yellow card) 13'; Cheryshev 29'; Chernyshov (yellow card) 38' (red card) 71'; Shulgin (yellow card) 42'; Simutenkov (yellow card) 44' (goal) 90' | Stadium: Dynamo Stadium; Referee: Valentin Ivanov |

| 18 September 1994 24 | CSKA Moscow | 0 – 0 | Torpedo Moscow | Moscow |
| MSK (UTC+4) | | Report | | Stadium: Dynamo Stadium; Referee: V.Filippov |

| 23 September 1994 25 | Rotor Volgograd | 2 – 1 | CSKA Moscow | Volgograd |
| MSK (UTC+4) | Yeshchenko (yellow card) 40'; Herashchenko 80'; Niederhaus 85'; Nechay (yellow card) 87' | Report | Semyonov (yellow card) 17'; Shoukov (yellow card) 29'; Radimov (yellow card) 31'; Faizulin 65'; Kolotovkin (yellow card) 68' | Stadium: Central Stadium; Referee: Nikolai Levnikov |

| 2 October 1994 26 | CSKA Moscow | 2 – 0 | Alania Vladikavkaz | Moscow |
| MSK (UTC+4) | Sergeyev 40', 77'; Radimov (yellow card) 51'; Minko (penalty missed) 59'; Sinyov (yellow card) 63'; Bushmanov (yellow card) 86' | Report | Lebed (yellow card) 11'; Denisov (yellow card) 24'; Kornienko (yellow card) 33'; Alchagirov (yellow card) 44'; Gorelov (yellow card) 65' | Stadium: Dynamo Stadium; Referee: I.Siner |

| 16 October 1994 27 | KAMAZ Naberezhnye Chelny | 1 – 1 | CSKA Moscow | Naberezhnye Chelny |
| 17:00 MSK (UTC+4) | Varaksin 84' | Report | Broshin (yellow card) 15'; Sergeyev 34' | Stadium: KAMAZ Stadium; Referee: Lom-Ali Ibragimov |

| 23 October 1994 28 | CSKA Moscow | 2 – 1 | Uralmash Yekaterinburg | Moscow |
| MSK (UTC+4) | Broshin (yellow card) 71'; Radimov 75' (yellow card) 80'; Bushmanov 83' (pen.) | Report | Yamlikhanov (yellow card) 19'; Zayets (yellow card) 49'; Yushkov (yellow card) 78'; Ratnichkin (yellow card) 80'; Khankeyev (yellow card) 80'; Matveyev 89' | Stadium: Dynamo Stadium; Referee: Yuri Chebotaryov |

| 30 October 1994 29 | Lokomotiv Nizhny Novgorod | 2 – 0 | CSKA Moscow | Nizhny Novgorod |
| MSK (UTC+3) | Kalitvintsev 4', 29' (penalty missed) '48; Davydov (yellow card) 32'; Nikulkin (yellow card) 70'; Ragulin (yellow card) 87' | Report | | Stadium: Lokomotiv Stadium; Referee: G.Kulichenkov |

| 6 November 1994 30 | CSKA Moscow | 4 – 0 | Tyumen | Moscow |
| MSK (UTC+3) | Semak 19'; Sergeyev 34', 84'; Radimov 54'; Mashkarin (yellow card) 69' | Report | | Stadium: Dynamo Stadium; Referee: Yuri Chebotaryov |

==== League table ====
| Pos | Team | Pld | W | D | L | GF | GA | GD | Pts |
|---|---|---|---|---|---|---|---|---|---|
| 8 | Lokomotiv N.N. | 30 | 11 | 8 | 11 | 34 | 34 | 0 | 30 |
| 9 | Zhemchuzhina Sochi (Note: FC Zhemchuzhina Sochi was called FC Zhemchuzhina-Kuban Sochi for part of the season.) | 30 | 8 | 11 | 11 | 44 | 48 | −4 | 27 |
| 10 | CSKA Moscow | 30 | 8 | 10 | 12 | 30 | 32 | −2 | 26 |
| 11 | Torpedo Moscow | 30 | 7 | 12 | 11 | 28 | 37 | −9 | 26 |
| 12 | Dynamo-Gazovik Tyumen | 30 | 7 | 10 | 13 | 24 | 49 | −25 | 24 |

Source: rsssf.com
Rules for classification: 1) points; 2) goal difference; 3) number of goals scored.

=== Russian Cup ===
==== 1993-94 ====
| 13 April 1994 Quarterfinal | Lokomotiv Moscow | 2 – 2 (a.e.t.) (3 – 4 p) | CSKA Moscow | Moscow |
| MSK (UTC+4) | Rakhimov 56'; Leonchenko (yellow card) 59'; Kosolapov 106' | Report | Bystrov 8' (yellow card) 30'; Radimov (yellow card) 58'; Grishin 104' | Stadium: Lokomotiv Stadium; Attendance: 5,250; Referee: Anatoli Malyarov |
| | Penalties |
| | Kosolapov (penalty scored); Rakhimov (penalty scored); Garin (penalty scored); Podpaly (penalty missed); Nikulkin (penalty missed); Hovhannisyan (penalty missed) | | (penalty scored) Grishin; (penalty missed) Broshin; (penalty missed) Bavykin; (penalty scored) Bushmanov; (penalty scored) Ivanov; (penalty scored) Fayzulin |

| 7 May 1994 Semifinal | CSKA Moscow | 1 – 1 (a.e.t.) (5 – 3 p) | Spartak Vladikavkaz | Moscow |
| MSK (UTC+4) | Bystrov (yellow card) 16'; Faizulin (yellow card) 50'; Gushchin 61'; Grishin (yellow card) 115' | Report | Yanovsky (yellow card) 79'; Tedeyev 80'; Denisov (yellow card) 100'; Suanov (yellow card) 113' | Stadium: Dynamo Stadium; Attendance: 7,500; Referee: Yuri Chebotaryov |
| | Penalties |
| | Grishin (penalty scored); Bushmanov (penalty scored); Mashkarin (penalty scored); Bystrov (penalty scored); Fayzulin (penalty scored) | | (penalty scored) Gazdanov; (penalty scored) Qosimov; (penalty scored) Tedeyev; (penalty missed) Denisov |

| 22 May 1994 Final | Spartak Moscow | 2 – 2 (a.e.t.) (4 – 2 p) | CSKA Moscow | Moscow |
| MSK (UTC+4) | Lediakhov 6'; Karpin 11'; Mamedov (yellow card) 57'; Ternavski (yellow card) 84' | Report | Guschin (yellow card) 24'; Radimov 39'; Bystrov 58'; Ivanov (yellow card) 92' | Stadium: Luzhniki Stadium; Attendance: 30,000; Referee: Sergei Anokhin |
| | Penalties |
| | Lediakhov (penalty scored); Onopko (penalty scored); Ternavski (penalty scored); Alenichev (penalty scored) | | (penalty scored) Grishin; (penalty missed) Bushmanov; (penalty missed) Kupriyanov; (penalty scored) Bystrov |

==== 1994-95 ====
| 5 October 1994 Round of 32 | Zenit St.Petersburg | 0 – 2 | CSKA Moscow | Saint Petersburg |
| MSK (UTC+4) | Ugarov (yellow card) 65' | Report | Shirshakov (yellow card) 14'; Semak 16'; Semyonov (yellow card) 17' (red card) 54'; Sergeyev 83'; Bushmanov (yellow card) 59' | Stadium: Petrovsky Stadium; Attendance: 3,000; Referee: Aleksandr Lapin |

| 9 November 1994 Round of 16 | Torpedo Moscow | 1 – 1 (a.e.t.) (4 – 2 p) | CSKA Moscow | Moscow |
| MSK (UTC+3) | Grishin 14'; Cheltsov (yellow card) 41'; Vostrosablin (yellow card) 47' | Report | Sergeyev 10'; Radimov (yellow card) 40'; Bystrov (yellow card) 119' | Stadium: Torpedo Stadium; Attendance: 3,500; Referee: Andrei Budogosskiy |
| | Penalties |
| | Afanasyev (penalty scored); Ulyanov (penalty scored); Grishin (penalty missed); Nikolayev (penalty scored); Agashkov (penalty scored) | | (penalty missed) Bystrov; (penalty missed) Bushmanov; (penalty scored) Ivanov; (penalty scored) Mamchur |

=== UEFA Cup Winners' Cup ===
| 15 September 1994 First Round 1st leg | CSKA Moscow (Russia) | 2 – 1 | (Hungary) Ferencváros | Moscow, Russia |
| 20:00 MSK (UTC+3) | Shoukov (yellow card) 40'; Mamchur 42'; Sergeyev 73' | Report | Christiansen 58' (yellow card) 58'; Neagoe (yellow card) 87' | Stadium: Dynamo Stadium; Attendance: 6,000; Referee: Veselin Bogdanov (Bulgaria) |

| 29 September 1994 First Round 2nd leg | Ferencváros (Hungary) | 2 – 1 (a.e.t.) (7 – 6 p) | (Russia) CSKA Moscow | Budapest, Hungary |
| 20:00 MSK (UTC+4) | Simon (yellow card) 24'; Lipcsei (yellow card) 29' (goal) 36'; Szekeres (yellow card) 43'; Neagoe 44' | Report | Radimov 15' (yellow card) 105'; Kolotovkin (yellow card) 19'; Mamchur (yellow card) 33'; Faizulin (red card) 54'; Broshin (yellow card) 83' | Stadium: Üllői úti stadion Attendance: 20,000; Referee: Wieland Ziller (Germany) |
| | Penalties |
| | Gregor (penalty scored); Lisztes (penalty scored); Christiansen (penalty scored); Szekeres (penalty scored); Lipcsei (penalty scored); Zavadszky (penalty scored); Hrutka (penalty scored) | | (penalty scored) Bystrov; (penalty scored) Bushmanov; (penalty scored) Demchenko; (penalty scored) Mamchur; (penalty scored) Minko; (penalty scored) Broshin; (penalty missed) Kolotovkin |

== Squad statistics ==
As of match played 9 November 1994

=== Appearances and goals ===
| No. | Pos | Nat | Player | Total | | Top League | | 1993–94 Russian Cup | | 1994–95 Russian Cup | | Cup Winners' Cup | |
| No. | Pos | Nat | Player | Apps | Goals | Apps | Goals | Apps | Goals | Apps | Goals | Apps | Goals |
|---|---|---|---|---|---|---|---|---|---|---|---|---|---|
| | GK | (Russia) RUS | Andrei Novosadov | 11 | 0 | 8 | 0 | 0 | 0 | 1 | 0 | 2 | 0 |
| | GK | (Russia) RUS | Yevgeni Plotnikov | 24 | 0 | 21 | 0 | 2 | 0 | 1 | 0 | 0 | 0 |
| | DF | (Russia) RUS | Yevgeni Bushmanov | 30 | 2 | 23+1 | 2 | 3 | 0 | 2 | 0 | 0+1 | 0 |
| | DF | (Russia) RUS | Dmitri Bystrov | 32 | 4 | 25+1 | 2 | 3 | 2 | 2 | 0 | 1 | 0 |
| | DF | (Russia) RUS | Aleksei Guschin | 16 | 1 | 13 | 0 | 3 | 1 | 0 | 0 | 0 | 0 |
| | DF | (Russia) RUS | Sergei Kolotovkin | 15 | 0 | 10+1 | 0 | 0 | 0 | 2 | 0 | 2 | 0 |
| | DF | (Russia) RUS | Sergei Mamchur | 27 | 1 | 20+1 | 0 | 2 | 0 | 2 | 0 | 2 | 1 |
| | DF | (Russia) RUS | Valeri Minko | 19 | 2 | 16 | 2 | 0 | 0 | 2 | 0 | 1 | 0 |
| | DF | (Russia) RUS | Dmitri Shirshakov | 2 | 0 | 1 | 0 | 0 | 0 | 1 | 0 | 0 | 0 |
| | DF | (Russia) RUS | Mikhail Sinyov | 10 | 0 | 7+1 | 0 | 0 | 0 | 0 | 0 | 2 | 0 |
| | MF | (Belarus) BLR | Yuri Antonovich | 26 | 2 | 19+3 | 2 | 2 | 0 | 0+1 | 0 | 1 | 0 |
| | MF | (Russia) RUS | Aleksandr Grishin | 25 | 3 | 12+9 | 1 | 0+3 | 2 | 1 | 0 | 0 | 0 |
| | MF | (Russia) RUS | Vasili Ivanov | 18 | 1 | 12+3 | 1 | 1+1 | 0 | 0+1 | 0 | 0 | 0 |
| | MF | (Russia) RUS | Dmitri Khokhlov | 1 | 0 | 1 | 0 | 0 | 0 | 0 | 0 | 0 | 0 |
| | MF | (Russia) RUS | Denis Mashkarin | 22 | 0 | 12+5 | 0 | 1+1 | 0 | 0+1 | 0 | 2 | 0 |
| | MF | (Russia) RUS | Vladislav Radimov | 32 | 6 | 27 | 4 | 2 | 1 | 1 | 0 | 2 | 1 |
| | MF | (Russia) RUS | Sergei Semak | 8 | 2 | 3+2 | 1 | 0 | 0 | 2 | 1 | 0+1 | 0 |
| | MF | (Russia) RUS | Vladimir Semyonov | 5 | 0 | 4 | 0 | 0 | 0 | 1 | 0 | 0 | 0 |
| | MF | (Russia) RUS | Dmitri Shoukov | 19 | 0 | 8+6 | 0 | 1+1 | 0 | 0+1 | 0 | 2 | 0 |
| | MF | (Russia) RUS | Vladimir Tatarchuk | 11 | 0 | 5+3 | 0 | 2 | 0 | 0 | 0 | 1 | 0 |
| | MF | (Russia) RUS | Valeri Broshin | 28 | 3 | 21+1 | 3 | 2+1 | 0 | 1 | 0 | 2 | 0 |
| | FW | (Russia) RUS | Ilshat Faizulin | 36 | 5 | 28+1 | 5 | 3 | 0 | 1+1 | 0 | 2 | 0 |
| | FW | (Russia) RUS | Oleg Sergeyev | 23 | 8 | 11+8 | 5 | 1 | 0 | 2 | 2 | 0+1 | 1 |
Players who left CSKA Moscow during the season:
| | GK | (Russia) RUS | Aleksandr Guteyev | 2 | 0 | 1 | 0 | 1 | 0 | 0 | 0 | 0 | 0 |
| | DF | (Russia) RUS | Yuri Bavykin | 7 | 1 | 4+2 | 1 | 1 | 0 | 0 | 0 | 0 | 0 |
| | DF | (Russia) RUS | Mikhail Kupriyanov | 14 | 0 | 10+1 | 0 | 3 | 0 | 0 | 0 | 0 | 0 |
| | MF | (Russia) RUS | Aleksei Bobrov | 7 | 0 | 6 | 0 | 0+1 | 0 | 0 | 0 | 0 | 0 |
| | FW | (Azerbaijan) AZE | Vladislav Lemish | 5 | 0 | 2+3 | 0 | 0 | 0 | 0 | 0 | 0 | 0 |
| | FW | (Russia) RUS | Aleksei Bychkov | 3 | 0 | 0+2 | 0 | 0+1 | 0 | 0 | 0 | 0 | 0 |
| | FW | (Russia) RUS | Andriy Demchenko | 2 | 0 | 0 | 0 | 0 | 0 | 0+1 | 0 | 0+1 | 0 |
| | FW | (Russia) RUS | Vyacheslav Melnikov | 1 | 0 | 0+1 | 0 | 0 | 0 | 0 | 0 | 0 | 0 |

=== Goal scorers ===
| Place | Position | Nation | Name | Top League | 1993–94 Russian Cup | 1994–95 Russian Cup | Cup Winners' Cup | Total |
|---|---|---|---|---|---|---|---|---|
| 1 | FW | (Russia) | Oleg Sergeyev | 5 | 0 | 2 | 1 | 8 |
| 2 | MF | (Russia) | Vladislav Radimov | 4 | 1 | 0 | 1 | 6 |
| 3 | FW | (Russia) | Ilshat Faizulin | 5 | 0 | 0 | 0 | 5 |
| 4 | DF | (Russia) | Dmitri Bystrov | 2 | 2 | 0 | 0 | 4 |
| 5 | MF | (Russia) | Valeri Broshin | 3 | 0 | 0 | 0 | 3 |
| 6 | DF | (Russia) | Yevgeni Bushmanov | 2 | 0 | 0 | 0 | 2 |
| 6 | MF | (Belarus) | Yuri Antonovich | 2 | 0 | 0 | 0 | 2 |
| 6 | DF | (Russia) | Valeri Minko | 2 | 0 | 0 | 0 | 2 |
| 6 | MF | (Russia) | Aleksandr Grishin | 1 | 1 | 0 | 0 | 2 |
| 6 | MF | (Russia) | Sergei Semak | 1 | 0 | 1 | 0 | 2 |
| 11 | DF | (Russia) | Yuri Bavykin | 1 | 0 | 0 | 0 | 1 |
| 11 | MF | (Russia) | Vasili Ivanov | 1 | 0 | 0 | 0 | 1 |
| 11 | DF | (Russia) | Aleksei Guschin | 0 | 1 | 0 | 0 | 1 |
| 11 | DF | (Russia) | Sergei Mamchur | 0 | 0 | 0 | 1 | 1 |
| 11 | | | Own goal | 1 | 0 | 0 | 0 | 1 |
| | | | TOTALS | 30 | 5 | 3 | 3 | 41 |

=== Disciplinary record ===
| Nation | Position | Name | Top League | | 1993–94 Russian Cup | | 1994–95 Russian Cup | | Cup Winners' Cup | | Total | |
| Nation | Position | Name | Booked | Sent off (straight red) | Booked | Sent off (straight red) | Booked | Sent off (straight red) | Booked | Sent off (straight red) | Booked | Sent off (straight red) |
| (Russia) | GK | Yevgeni Plotnikov | 1 | 0 | 0 | 0 | 0 | 0 | 0 | 0 | 1 | 0 |
| (Russia) | DF | Yevgeni Bushmanov | 1 | 0 | 0 | 0 | 1 | 0 | 0 | 0 | 2 | 0 |
| (Russia) | DF | Dmitri Bystrov | 1 | 1 | 2 | 0 | 1 | 0 | 0 | 0 | 4 | 1 |
| (Russia) | DF | Aleksei Guschin | 2 | 0 | 1 | 0 | 0 | 0 | 0 | 0 | 3 | 0 |
| (Russia) | DF | Sergei Kolotovkin | 2 | 0 | 0 | 0 | 0 | 0 | 1 | 0 | 3 | 0 |
| (Russia) | DF | Sergei Mamchur | 7 | 1 | 0 | 0 | 0 | 0 | 1 | 0 | 8 | 1 |
| (Russia) | DF | Denis Mashkarin | 2 | 0 | 0 | 0 | 0 | 0 | 0 | 0 | 2 | 0 |
| (Russia) | DF | Dmitri Shirshakov | 0 | 0 | 0 | 0 | 1 | 0 | 0 | 0 | 1 | 0 |
| (Russia) | DF | Mikhail Sinyov | 2 | 0 | 0 | 0 | 0 | 0 | 0 | 0 | 2 | 0 |
| (Belarus) | MF | Yuri Antonovich | 2 | 0 | 0 | 0 | 0 | 0 | 0 | 0 | 2 | 0 |
| (Russia) | MF | Aleksandr Grishin | 3 | 0 | 1 | 0 | 0 | 0 | 0 | 0 | 4 | 0 |
| (Russia) | MF | Vasili Ivanov | 3 | 0 | 1 | 0 | 0 | 0 | 0 | 0 | 4 | 0 |
| (Russia) | MF | Vladislav Radimov | 4 | 0 | 1 | 0 | 1 | 0 | 1 | 0 | 7 | 0 |
| (Russia) | MF | Vladimir Semyonov | 1 | 0 | 0 | 0 | 2 | 1 | 0 | 0 | 3 | 1 |
| (Russia) | MF | Dmitri Shoukov | 2 | 0 | 0 | 0 | 0 | 0 | 1 | 0 | 3 | 0 |
| (Russia) | MF | Vladimir Tatarchuk | 1 | 0 | 0 | 0 | 0 | 0 | 0 | 0 | 1 | 0 |
| (Russia) | MF | Valeri Broshin | 3 | 0 | 0 | 0 | 0 | 0 | 1 | 0 | 4 | 0 |
| (Russia) | FW | Ilshat Faizulin | 1 | 0 | 1 | 0 | 0 | 0 | 1 | 0 | 3 | 0 |
| | | TOTALS | 38 | 2 | 7 | 0 | 6 | 1 | 5 | 1 | 56 | 4 |
