= Vladimir Merovshchikov =

Russian footballer and coach

Personal information
- Full name: Vladimir Stanislavovich Merovshchikov
- Date of birth: 13 January 1956 (age 70)
- Height: 1.85 m (6 ft 1 in)
- Position: Goalkeeper

Senior career*
Years	Team	Apps	(Gls)
1974–1978	FC Dynamo Vologda		
1979–1988	FC Fakel Voronezh	224	(0)
1988–1989	FC Spartak Tambov	55	(0)
1990–1991	FC Buran Voronezh	46	(0)
1991	Olimpia Elbląg		
1992	FC Irgiz Balakovo	7	(0)
1992–1993	FC Lada Dimitrovgrad	42	(0)
1995–1998	FC Lokomotiv Liski	38	(0)

Managerial career
- 1999: FC Lokomotiv Liski (assistant)
- 2001–2004: FC Severstal Cherepovets (assistant)
- 2005: FC Sheksna Cherepovets
- 2010: FC Sheksna Cherepovets (assistant)
- * Club domestic league appearances and goals

Vladimir Stanislavovich Merovshchikov (Russian: Владимир Станиславович Меровщиков; born 13 January 1956) is a Russian professional football coach and a former player currently working as an assistant manager with FC Sheksna Cherepovets.
