= Gennadi Remezov =

Russian footballer (born 1965)

Gennadi Remezov Геннадий Викторович Ремезов
Personal information
- Full name: Gennadi Viktorovich Remezov
- Date of birth: 19 March 1965 (age 61)
- Place of birth: Voronezh, Russian SFSR
- Height: 1.76 m (5 ft 9 1/2 in)
- Positions: Midfielder; striker

Youth career
- FC Dynamo Voronezh
- FC Fakel Voronezh

Senior career*
Years	Team	Apps	(Gls)
1982	FC Strela Voronezh	23	(0)
1983–1986	FC Fakel Voronezh	24	(0)
1987	FC Ekibastuzets	23	(7)
1988	FC Kairat	1	(0)
1989–1990	FC Khimik Semiluki	25	(3)
1990	FC Buran Voronezh	29	(4)
1991	FC Spartak Tambov	33	(8)
1992	FC Irgiz Balakovo	39	(22)
1993–1994	FC Krylia Sovetov Samara	45	(11)
1994–1995	Hapoel Ironi Rishon LeZion F.C.	2	(1)
1995	Beitar Tel Aviv F.C.	11	(1)
1995	FC Krylia Sovetov Samara	3	(0)
1996	FC Fakel Voronezh	2	(0)
1997	FC Rassvet Troitskoye	24	(15)
1998	FC Uralmash Yekaterinburg	27	(11)
1999	FC Metallurg Lipetsk	26	(0)
2001	FC Gazovik Ostrogozhsk		
2002	FC Lokomotiv Liski	28	(5)
- * Club domestic league appearances and goals

Gennadi Viktorovich Remezov (Russian: Геннадий Викторович Ремезов; born 19 March 1965) is a former Russian professional footballer.

== Club career ==
He made his professional debut in the Soviet Second League in 1982 for FC Strela Voronezh.

== Honours ==
- USSR Federation Cup winner: 1988.
