= Ochir Shurgchiyev =

Russian footballer

Personal information
- Full name: Ochir Vladimirovich Shurgchiyev
- Date of birth: 18 January 1984 (age 42)
- Place of birth: Elista, Russian SFSR
- Height: 1.87 m (6 ft 1 1/2 in)
- Position: Goalkeeper

Youth career
- FC Uralan Elista

Senior career*
Years	Team	Apps	(Gls)
2001	FC Uralan-d Elista (amateur)		
2002–2004	FC Uralan Elista	5	(0)
2004	FSC Ulan-Zalata Lagan		
2005	FC Mashuk-KMV Pyatigorsk	13	(0)
2006	FC Elista	4	(0)
2007	FC Volga Tver	23	(0)
2008	FC Astrakhan	8	(0)
- * Club domestic league appearances and goals

Ochir Vladimirovich Shurgchiyev (Russian: Очир Владимирович Шургчиев; born 18 January 1984) is a former Russian football player.
