= Ragulin =

Ragulin (Russian: Рагулин) is a Slavic masculine surname, its feminine counterpart is Ragulina. Notable people with the surname include:

- Alexander Ragulin (1941–2004), Soviet ice hockey player
- Sergei Ragulin (born 1967), Russian football player
