= Yuri Moiseyev =

Yuri Moiseyev may refer to:

- Yuri Moiseyev (ice hockey) (1940-2005), Soviet Russian ice hockey player
- Yuri Moiseyev (footballer) (born 1960), Russian footballer
