= Vadim Logunov =

Russian footballer (1968–2021)

Personal information
- Full name: Vadim Yuryevich Logunov
- Date of birth: 2 March 1968
- Place of birth: Lipetsk, Lipetsk Oblast, Russian SFSR, Soviet Union
- Date of death: 12 May 2021 (aged 53)
- Height: 1.82 m (6 ft 0 in)
- Positions: Forward; midfielder

Youth career
- Metallurg Lipetsk

Senior career*
Years	Team	Apps	(Gls)
1985–1986	Metallurg Lipetsk	13	(0)
1990–1991	APK Azov	41	(6)
1992	Tavriya Kherson	8	(0)
1992	Lokomotiv Nizhny Novgorod	4	(0)
1993	Metallurg Lipetsk	17	(2)
- * Club domestic league appearances and goals

Vadim Yuryevich Logunov (Russian: Вадим Юрьевич Логунов; 2 March 1968 – 12 May 2021) was a Russian footballer who played as a forward or midfielder.
