= 79th Motor Rifle Division =

Motor rifle division of the Soviet military

Sakhalin Rifle Division (1938–1939) 79th Mountain Rifle Division (1939–1940) 79th Rifle Division (1940–1957) 79th Motor Rifle Division (1957–1994)
- Active: 1938–1994
- Country: Soviet Union (to 1991); Russia (1991–1994)
- Branch: Soviet Army
- Type: Motorized infantry
- Garrison/HQ: Leonidovo
- Engagements: World War II: Invasion of South Sakhalin; Proposed Soviet invasion of Hokkaido
- Decorations: Order of the Red Banner
- Battle honours: Sakhalin

The 79th Motor Rifle Division was a motorized infantry division of the Soviet Army. It was converted from the 79th Rifle Division in 1957 and inherited the honorific "Sakhalin". The division was awarded the Order of the Red Banner. The 79th Rifle Division fought in the Invasion of South Sakhalin in 1945 and was based at Leonidovo for most of its career.

== History ==
The 79th traces its history back to the formation of the Sakhalin Rifle Division on 17 August 1938. In January 1939, the division became the 79th Mountain Rifle Division, commanded by Kombrig Ivan Makarenko. In 1940, it was converted into the 79th Rifle Division. It became part of the 16th Army's 56th Rifle Corps in 1943. During August and September 1945, the division fought in the Invasion of South Sakhalin. For its actions in the invasion, the division was awarded the honorific "Sakhalin". During the battle for south Sakhalin, 179th Rifle Regiment Battalion commander Captain Leonid Smirnykh was posthumously awarded the title Hero of the Soviet Union after his battalion captured 5 bunkers and Smirnykh was killed by sniper fire. Sergeant Anton Buyukly was also made a Hero of the Soviet Union posthumously in 1965 for his sacrifice in blocking a bunker firing slit with his body.

The division became the 79th Motor Rifle Division on 17 May 1957 in Leonidovo, part of the 15th Army. In March 1960, it became part of the 2nd Army Corps. On 22 February 1968, it was awarded the Order of the Red Banner on the Soviet Army's 50th anniversary. The division became part of the 51st Army in 1977. During the Cold War, the division was maintained at 15% strength. In 1994, the division was disbanded.

== Commanders ==
The following officers commanded the division.

- Kombrig (Major General 4 June 1940) Ivan Makarenko (27 January 1939 – 14 May 1942)
- Major General Alexander Mikhailovich Maximov (15 May 1942 – 27 June 1942)
- Colonel (Major General 16 October 1943) Ivan Baturov (28 June 1942 – 3 September 1945)

== Composition ==
The 79th Rifle Division included the following units.

- 157th Rifle Regiment
- 165th Rifle Regiment
- 179th Rifle Regiment
- 644th Divisional Artillery Brigade
- 284th Artillery Regiment
- 487th Howitzer Artillery Regiment
- 360th Separate Tank Battalion
- 163rd Separate Antitank Battalion
- 251st Separate Antiaircraft Artillery Battalion
- 78th Mortar Battalion
- 9th Reconnaissance Battalion
- 43rd Sapper Battalion
- 931st Separate Communications Battalion (became 187th Separate Communications Battalion, then 134th Separate Communications Company)
- 211th Medical and Sanitary Battalion
- 192nd Separate Chemical Defence Company
- 808th Motor Company (became 180th Trucking Company, then 376th Motor Transport Battalion)
- 138th Repair and Replacement Company
- 121st Field Bakery
- 79th Mobile Field Hospital
- 177th Divisional Veterinary Hospital
- 32nd Divisional Artillery Workshop
- 58th Field Post Office
- 1043rd Field Ticket Office of the State Bank

The 79th Motor Rifle Division included the following units in 1988. All units are based at Leonidovo unless noted.

- 157th Motorized Rifle Regiment (Pobedino)
- 396th Motorized Rifle Regiment
- 398th Motorized Rifle Regiment (Gastello)
- 113th Tank Regiment
- 284th Artillery Regiment
- 1224th Antiaircraft Missile Regiment (Pobedino)
- 124th Separate Missile Battalion
- Separate Reconnaissance Battalion
- 43rd Separate Engineer-Sapper Battalion
- 931st Separate Communications Battalion
- Separate Chemical Defence Company
- Separate Equipment Maintenance and Recovery Battalion
- Separate Medical Battalion (Gastello)
- 1489th Separate Material Supply Battalion
