= Goran Sretenović =

Serbian footballer and coach

Personal information
- Date of birth: 9 December 1968 (age 57)
- Height: 1.90 m (6 ft 3 in)
- Position: Goalkeeper

Senior career*
Years	Team	Apps	(Gls)
1997–2000	Radnički Kragujevac	20	(0)
2000	Uralan Elista	4	(0)
2001–2002	Radnički Kragujevac	4	(0)

Managerial career
- 2013: Serbia U-17 (assistant)
- 2014: Serbia U-19 (assistant)
- 2015–2016: Serbia U-16 (assistant)
- 2023-: AS Trenčín (assistant)
- * Club domestic league appearances and goals

Goran Sretenović (Serbian Cyrillic: Горан Cpeтeнoвић; born 9 December 1968) is a Serbian football coach and a former player. Some Russian sources misspell his last name as Stretenovic.

He is currently one of the coaches for the Serbia national under-16 football team.

He allowed 9 goals for FC Uralan Elista against FC Lokomotiv Moscow on 3 November 2000 in a record biggest loss (0-9) in the history of the Russian Football Premier League. Overall, he allowed 18 goals in just 4 RFPL games.

He is one of the assistant managers of Ilija Stolica of the Serbian U-17 playing at the 2016 UEFA European Under-17 Championship.
