= Viktor Suloyev =

Russian footballer

Personal information
- Full name: Viktor Viktorovich Suloyev
- Date of birth: 26 September 1984 (age 42)
- Height: 1.90 m (6 ft 3 in)
- Position: Goalkeeper

Team information
- Current team: FC Avangard Kursk (GK coach)

Youth career
- FC Torpedo Lyubertsy
- SDYuSShOR-63 Smena Moscow

Senior career*
Years	Team	Apps	(Gls)
2003	FC Titan Moscow	4	(0)
2004–2005	FC Reutov	22	(0)
2006	FC Zorkiy Krasnogorsk (amateur)		
2007–2008	FC Reutov	28	(0)
2009–2010	FC Dynamo Bryansk	23	(0)
2011–2012	FC Avangard Kursk	15	(0)
2013–2014	FC Dynamo Bryansk	6	(0)
2015–2017	FC Avangard Kursk	20	(0)

Managerial career
- 2020–: FC Avangard Kursk (GK coach)
- * Club domestic league appearances and goals

Viktor Viktorovich Suloyev (Russian: Виктор Викторович Сулоев; born 26 September 1984) is a Russian professional football coach and a former player. He works as the goalkeepers' coach for FC Avangard Kursk.

== Club career ==
He played in the Russian Football National League for FC Dynamo Bryansk in 2010.
