= Vladimir Kharin =

Vladimir Kharin may refer to:

- Vladimir Kharin (footballer) (born 1964), Russian football player
- Vladimir Kharin (zoologist) (1957–2013), Russian zoologist, ichthyologist, herpetologist
