= Yuri Ulyumdzhiyev =

Russian footballer

Personal information
- Full name: Yuri Olegovich Ulyumdzhiyev
- Date of birth: 20 December 1982 (age 43)
- Height: 1.82 m (5 ft 11 1/2 in)
- Position: Forward

Senior career*
Years	Team	Apps	(Gls)
1997–1999	FC Uralan-d Elista (amateur)		
2000	FC Uralan Elista	0	(0)
2001	FC Zhemchuzhina Sochi	4	(0)
2001	FC Mashuk Pyatigorsk (amateur)		
2002–2004	FC Uralan Elista	19	(1)
2005	FC Tom Tomsk	0	(0)
2006	FC Elista	10	(1)
- * Club domestic league appearances and goals

Yuri Olegovich Ulyumdzhiyev (Russian: Юрий Олегович Улюмджиев; born 20 December 1982) is a former Russian football player.
