= Artem Yashkin =

Ukrainian footballer

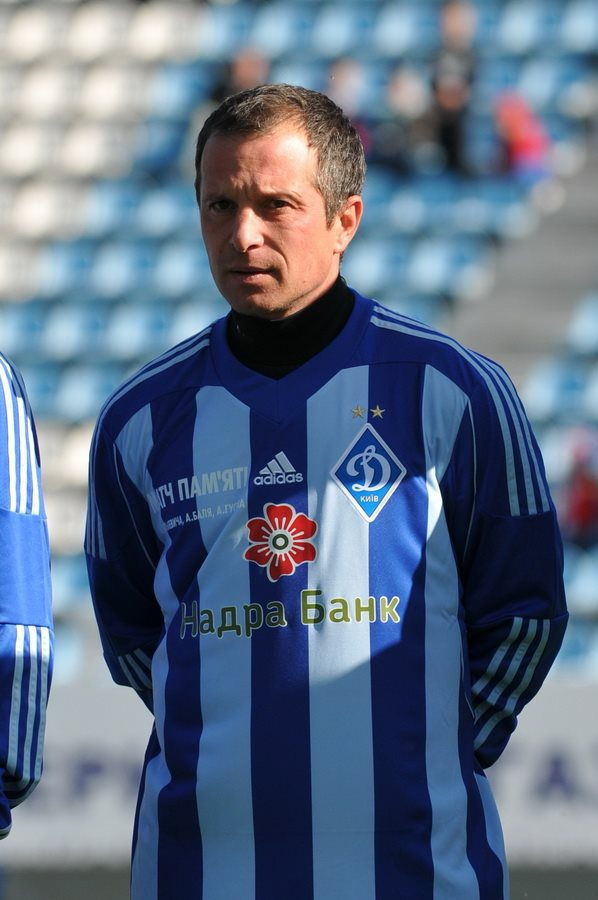
- Artem Yashkin in 2014.

Personal information
- Full name: Artem Oleksandrovych Yashkin
- Date of birth: 29 April 1975 (age 51)
- Place of birth: Vologda, Russian SFSR
- Height: 1.76 m (5 ft 9 in)
- Position: Midfielder

Team information
- Current team: Dynamo Kyiv (assistant)

Senior career*
Years	Team	Apps	(Gls)
1992–1996	Shinnik Yaroslavl	137	(19)
1997–1998	Uralan Elista	54	(9)
1999–2001	Dynamo Kyiv	57	(10)
1999–2001	→ Dynamo-2 Kyiv	37	(10)
1999	→ Dynamo-3 Kyiv	2	(1)
2002	Shinnik Yaroslavl	3	(0)
2002–2003	Arsenal Kyiv	1	(0)
2004	Bucheon SK	23	(0)
2005	Dong Thap	?	(1)
2005–2006	Chornomorets Odesa	6	(0)
2006–2009	Dinaburg Daugavpils	34	(8)

International career
2000–2001	Ukraine	8	(0)

Managerial career
- 2025-: FC Dynamo Kyiv (assistant)
- * Club domestic league appearances and goals

Artem Oleksandrovych Yashkin (Ukrainian: Артем Олександрович Яшкін; born 29 April 1975) is a retired Ukrainian footballer.

== Career ==
He was born in Vologda, now in Russia. After coming to play for FC Dynamo Kyiv, he was offered to accept the Ukrainian citizenship and play for the Ukraine national football team. He has capped eight games for the Ukraine National Football team.

== Playing career ==
1992	FC Shinnik Yaroslavl	Russian Premier League 1st level	16/1*
1993	FC Shinnik Yaroslavl	Russian First Division 2nd level	35/4
1994	FC Shinnik Yaroslavl	Russian First Division 2nd level	28/5
1995	FC Shinnik Yaroslavl	Russian First Division 2nd level	17/3
1996	FC Shinnik Yaroslavl	Russian First Division 2nd level	41/6
1997	FC Uralan Elista	Russian First Division 2nd level	32/7
1998	FC Uralan Elista	Russian Premier League 1st level	22/2
1998–99	FC Dynamo Kyiv	Ukrainian Premier League 1st level	13/0
1999–00	FC Dynamo Kyiv	Ukrainian Premier League 1st level	19/3
2000–01	FC Dynamo Kyiv	Ukrainian Premier League 1st level	23/7
2001–02	FC Dynamo Kyiv	Ukrainian Premier League 1st level	2/0
2002	FC Shinnik Yaroslavl	Russian Premier League 1st level	3/0
2002–03	FC Arsenal Kyiv	Ukrainian Premier League 1st level	0/0
2004	Bucheon SK	K-League 1st level	23/0
2005	Delta Dong Thap	V-League 1st level	?/1
2005–06	FC Chornomorets Odesa	Ukrainian Premier League 1st level	6/0
2006	Dinaburg Daugavpils	Latvian Higher League 1st level	11/5
2007	Dinaburg Daugavpils	Latvian Higher League 1st level	8/1

* - played games and goals
