= Vladimir Kharin (footballer) =

Russian footballer

Personal information
- Full name: Vladimir Anatolyevich Kharin
- Date of birth: 13 September 1964 (age 62)
- Height: 1.82 m (5 ft 11 1/2 in)
- Position: Forward

Senior career*
Years	Team	Apps	(Gls)
1982	FC Fakel Voronezh	0	(0)
1982	FC Strela Voronezh	2	(1)
1983–1985	FC Fakel Voronezh	10	(0)
1986	FC Metallurg Lipetsk	25	(3)
1990	FC Buran Voronezh	32	(8)
1991	FC Spartak Tambov	32	(12)
1992–1994	FC Irgiz Balakovo	70	(42)
1994	FC Spartak Anapa	22	(2)
1995–2000	FC Lokomotiv Liski	185	(104)
- * Club domestic league appearances and goals

Vladimir Anatolyevich Kharin (Russian: Владимир Анатольевич Харин; born 13 September 1964) is a Russian former professional football player.

== Club career ==
Kharin was a promising young footballer when he made 10 appearances for FC Fakel Voronezh in the Soviet Top League during 1985, but he spent the remainder of his playing career in the lower levels of Soviet and Russian football.

== Honours ==
- Russian Second Division top scorer: 1993 (Zone 3, 22 goals), 1999 (Zone Center, 26 goals).
