= Rustam Khaidaraliyev =

Tajikistani footballer

Personal information
- Date of birth: 21 April 1971 (age 55)
- Height: 1.78 m (5 ft 10 in)
- Positions: Defender; midfielder

Senior career*
Years	Team	Apps	(Gls)
1990–1992	Regar-TadAZ Tursunzoda	92	(2)
1992–1994	Vorskla Poltava	57	(6)
1994	Hirnyk Komsomolsk	6	(0)
1995	Bazhanovets Makiivka	9	(0)
1995–1996	Hirnyk-Sport Komsomolsk	17	(1)
1996	FC Industriya Borovsk	20	(1)
1996–1997	FC Lokomotiv Nizhny Novgorod	12	(0)
1997	→ FC Lokomotiv-d Nizhny Novgorod (loan)	8	(0)
1997–1998	FC Torpedo Arzamas	33	(0)
1999	FC Volga Ulyanovsk	10	(0)
1999	Varzob Dushanbe		
2000	FC Shakhter-Ispat-Karmet	19	(1)
2001	FC Aktobe Lento	24	(0)
2002–2003	FC Taraz	36	(1)
2006–2007	Hima Dushanbe		

International career
1992–2003	Tajikistan	5	(0)
- * Club domestic league appearances and goals

Rustam Khaidaraliyev (born 21 April 1971) is a former Tajikistani football player.

== Honours ==
Regar-TadAZ Tursunzoda

- Tajik League runner-up: 1992
- Tajik Cup finalist: 1992

Varzob

- Tajik League champion: 1999
- Tajik Cup winner: 1999

Hima Dushanbe

- Tajik League runner-up: 2006
- Tajik Cup finalist: 2006, 2007
