= Dmitry Bystrov =

Russian footballer

- Bystrov with Zenit

Personal information
- Full name: Dmitry Vyacheslavovich Bystrov
- Date of birth: 30 July 1967
- Place of birth: Moscow, Russian SFSR, Soviet Union
- Date of death: 1 June 2005 (aged 37)
- Place of death: Moscow, Russia
- Height: 1.84 m (6 ft 1/2 in)
- Position: Defender

Youth career
- EShVSM Moscow

Senior career*
Years	Team	Apps	(Gls)
1983–1985	FC Lokomotiv Moscow	34	(0)
1986–1994	PFC CSKA Moscow	179	(6)
1995–1996	FC Zenit St. Petersburg	45	(0)
1996	FC Shinnik Yaroslavl	10	(0)
1997	Navbahor Namangan	4	(0)
1998	FC Lokomotiv Nizhny Novgorod	20	(0)
1999	FC Metallurg Lipetsk	35	(0)
2000	FC Access-Esil	19	(0)
2001	FC Presnya Moscow (amateur)		

Managerial career
- 2001–2002: FC Presnya Moscow
- 2004: FC Obninsk
- 2005: FC Lokomotiv-M Serpukhov (assistant)
- * Club domestic league appearances and goals

Dmitry Vyacheslavovich Bystrov (Russian: Дмитрий Вячеславович Быстров; 30 July 1967 – 1 June 2005) was a Soviet and Russian professional footballer and coach.

Bystrov died on 1 June 2005 of pneumonia.

== Honours ==
- Soviet Top League champion: 1991.
- Soviet Top League runner-up: 1990.
- Soviet Cup winner: 1991.
- Soviet Cup runner-up: 1990.
- Russian Cup runner-up: 1993, 1994.
- Uzbek League bronze: 1997.

== European club competitions ==
With PFC CSKA Moscow.

- European Cup Winners' Cup 1991–92: 2 games.
- UEFA Champions League 1992–93: 7 games.
- UEFA Cup Winners' Cup 1994–95: 1 game.
