= Alyaksandr Oreshnikow =

Belarusian footballer

Personal information
- Full name: Alyaksandr Nikolayevich Oreshnikow
- Date of birth: 25 May 1973 (age 53)
- Place of birth: Minsk, Soviet Union
- Height: 1.83 m (6 ft 0 in)
- Position: Defender

Youth career
- Dinamo Minsk

Senior career*
Years	Team	Apps	(Gls)
1992–1993	Fandok Bobriusk	51	(1)
1994	Shinnik Bobriusk	22	(0)
1995	MPKC Mozyr	3	(0)
1995–1998	Krylia Sovetov Samara	91	(1)
2000	Lokomotiv Nizhny Novgorod	11	(0)
2001–2003	Neftekhimik Nizhnekamsk	110	(2)
2004	Uralan Elista	18	(0)
2004	Sodovik Sterlitamak	11	(0)
2005	Neftekhimik Nizhnekamsk	12	(0)
2005	Metallurg-Kuzbass Novokuznetsk	24	(1)
2006–2008	Yunit Samara	42	(1)

International career
1994	Belarus U21	4	(0)
1996	Belarus	2	(0)
- * Club domestic league appearances and goals

Alyaksandr Oreshnikow (Russian: Александр Орешников; Belarusian: Аляксандр Мікалаевіч Арэшнікаў; born 25 May 1973) is a Belarusian former football defender.

Oreshnikow spent five seasons in the Russian Premier League from 1995 through 2000, four with FC Krylia Sovetov Samara and another with FC Lokomotiv Nizhny Novgorod, playing in over 100 league matches. He also made two appearances for the Belarus national football team during 1996.
