= Aleksei Ostayev =

Russian footballer

Personal information
- Full name: Aleksei Viktorovich Ostayev
- Date of birth: 23 March 1973 (age 53)
- Height: 1.78 m (5 ft 10 in)
- Positions: Forward; goalkeeper

Senior career*
Years	Team	Apps	(Gls)
1989	FC Khimik Oktyabrskoye		
1990–1991	FC Stroitel Vladikavkaz		
1991	FC Spartak Vladikavkaz	0	(0)
1991	FC Avtodor Vladikavkaz	1	(0)
1992	FC Stroitel Vladikavkaz		
1992–1993	FC Spartak Vladikavkaz	2	(0)
1995	FC Spartak-Alania Vladikavkaz	0	(0)
1995	→ FC Alania-d Vladikavkaz (loan)	8	(3)
1995	FC Gofrokarton Digora (amateur)		
1996	FC Gofrokarton Digora	25	(12)
1997	FC Spartak Anapa	7	(1)
1997	FC Masters Vladikavkaz		
1998	FC Elkhot Elkhotovo		
- * Club domestic league appearances and goals

Aleksei Viktorovich Ostayev (Russian: Алексей Викторович Остаев; born 23 March 1973) is a former Russian football player.

He played two games as a goalkeeper for FC Gofrokarton Digora in 1996.
