= Sergei Kolotovkin =

Russian footballer

Sergei Kolotovkin Серге́й Колотовкин
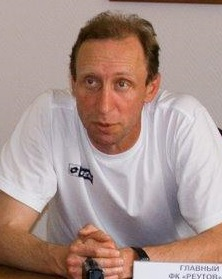
- Sergei Kolotovkin in 2007

Personal information
- Full name: Sergei Viktorovich Kolotovkin
- Date of birth: 28 September 1965 (age 61)
- Place of birth: Magnitogorsk, Russian SFSR
- Height: 1.78 m (5 ft 10 in)
- Position: Defender

Senior career*
Years	Team	Apps	(Gls)
1981	FC Metallurg Magnitogorsk	11	(0)
1982	FC Zenit-D Leningrad	4	(0)
1983–1985	FC Zenit Leningrad	2	(0)
1985–1986	FC Zenit-D St. Petersburg	14	(2)
1987–1993	PFC CSKA Moscow	178	(1)
1993	Beitar Jerusalem F.C.	7	(0)
1993–1994	Tzafririm Holon	26	(0)
1994	PFC CSKA Moscow	11	(0)
1995–1996	FC Dynamo Moscow	56	(0)
1997	FC Tyumen	31	(0)
1998–2000	Rostselmash	60	(1)
2001–2002	FC Sodovik Sterlitamak	41	(1)
Total		441	(5)

International career
1992	Russia	2	(0)

Managerial career
- 2005–2006: FC Zvezda Serpukhov
- 2007–2008: FC Reutov
- * Club domestic league appearances and goals

Sergei Viktorovich Kolotovkin (Russian: Серге́й Викторович Колотовкин; born 28 September 1965) is a retired Soviet and Russian football player and coach. He last worked as the manager of the Russian Second Division club FC Reutov.

== Club career ==
Kolotovkin played in the Soviet Top League (and later, Russian Top League) with FC Zenit Leningrad, PFC CSKA Moscow, FC Dynamo Moscow, FC Tyumen and Rostelmash Rostov. He played in 157 league matches before he scored his first goal (for Rostelmash in May 1999).

== Honours ==
- Soviet Union championship winner: 1991
- Soviet Union cup winner: 1991

== International career ==
Kolotovkin played his first game for Russia on 16 August 1992 in a friendly against Mexico.
