= Aleksandr Sayun =

Uzbekistani footballer

Personal information
- Full name: Aleksandr Vladimirovich Sayun
- Date of birth: 1 January 1975 (age 51)
- Place of birth: Termez, Uzbek SSR
- Height: 1.82 m (5 ft 11 1/2 in)
- Position: Midfielder

Senior career*
Years	Team	Apps	(Gls)
1991	FC Sokhibkor Khalkabad	1	(0)
1992	Shifokor Guliston	24	(1)
1994	FK Neftchi Farg'ona	4	(0)
1996	ASK Termez	10	(3)
1997	MHSK Tashkent	34	(0)
1998	FC Torpedo Moscow	11	(0)
1999	FC Uralan Elista	6	(0)
1999–2000	FC Lokomotiv Nizhny Novgorod	20	(0)
2001	FC Amkar Perm	1	(0)
2002	FC Svetotekhnika Saransk	17	(3)
2003	FC Lokomotiv-NN Nizhny Novgorod	12	(2)
2003	FC Lukoil Chelyabinsk	3	(0)
2004–2009	FC Dynamo Kirov	58	(15)
Total		201	(24)

International career
1998–1999	Uzbekistan	3	(0)
- * Club domestic league appearances and goals

Aleksandr Vladimirovich Sayun (Russian: Александр Владимирович Саюн; born 1 January 1975) is a former Uzbekistani professional footballer. He also holds Russian citizenship.

== Club career ==
He made his debut in the Russian Premier League in 1998 for FC Torpedo Moscow.

== Honours ==
- Uzbek League champion: 1994, 1997.
