= Aleksandr Tsilyurik =

Russian footballer (1965–2023)

Personal information
- Full name: Aleksandr Vladimirovich Tsilyurik
- Date of birth: 1 March 1965
- Place of birth: Kremenchuk, Poltava Oblast, Ukrainian SSR, USSR
- Date of death: 23 July 2023 (aged 58)
- Place of death: Yoshkar-Ola, Mari El, Russia
- Height: 1.76 m (5 ft 9 in)
- Positions: Forward; midfielder

Youth career
- KhOSShISP Kharkiv

Senior career*
Years	Team	Apps	(Gls)
1982	SKA Odessa	4	(0)
1982–1983	Mayak Kharkiv	37	(1)
1985	Okean Kerch	36	(3)
1987	SKA Odessa	26	(1)
1988	Druzhba Yoshkar-Ola	27	(10)
1988	Kuban Krasnodar	6	(1)
1989	Druzhba Yoshkar-Ola	40	(6)
1990	Lokomotiv Nizhny Novgorod	35	(9)
1991	Uralmash Yekaterinburg	41	(7)
1992	Lokomotiv Nizhny Novgorod	4	(0)
1992	Baltika Kaliningrad	22	(4)
1993	Druzhba Yoshkar-Ola	37	(11)
1994–1996	Krylia Sovetov Samara	53	(3)
1997	Diana Volzhsk (amateur)		
1998	Avangard Zelenodolsk		
1999	Svetotekhnika Saransk	15	(2)
1999	Spartak-Telekom Shuya	15	(6)
2000	Spartak Yoshkar-Ola	13	(0)
2000–2001	Spartak-Telekom Shuya	48	(10)
2001	Spartak Yoshkar-Ola	31	(4)

Managerial career
- 1998: Diana Volzhsk
- * Club domestic league appearances and goals

Aleksandr Vladimirovich Tsilyurik (Russian: Александр Владимирович Цилюрик; 1 March 1965 – 23 July 2023) was a Russian professional footballer who played as a forward or midfielder.

== Career ==
Tsilyurik made his professional debut in the Soviet Second League in 1982 for SKA Odessa.

== Personal life and death ==
His son, also called Aleksandr Tsilyurik, played football professionally as well.

Aleksandr Tsilyurik died on 23 July 2023, at the age of 58.
