= Andrei Rumyantsev =

Russian footballer (born 1969)

Personal information
- Full name: Andrei Aleksandrovich Rumyantsev
- Date of birth: 14 August 1969 (age 57)
- Place of birth: Gorky, Russian SFSR
- Height: 1.77 m (5 ft 10 in)
- Positions: Defender; midfielder

Youth career
- Krasnoye Sormovo Gorky

Senior career*
Years	Team	Apps	(Gls)
1987–1988	FC Lokomotiv Gorky	43	(0)
1990	PFC CSKA-2 Moscow	25	(0)
1990	FC SKA Rostov-on-Don	2	(1)
1991–1993	FC Lokomotiv Nizhny Novgorod	77	(7)
1994–1997	FC Baltika Kaliningrad	87	(1)
1998	FC Kuban Krasnodar	8	(0)
1999	FC Baltika Kaliningrad	17	(0)
2000	FC Nemkom Krasnodar (amateur)		
2000	FC Tarko Kaliningrad (amateur)		
2001	FC Aktobe	13	(0)
2002	FC Lokomotiv-NN Nizhny Novgorod (amateur)		
- * Club domestic league appearances and goals

Andrei Aleksandrovich Rumyantsev (Russian: Андрей Александрович Румянцев; born 14 August 1969) is a former Russian professional footballer.

== Club career ==
He made his professional debut in the Soviet Second League in 1987 for FC Lokomotiv Gorky.
