= Aleksei Bobrov (footballer, born 1972) =

Russian footballer

Personal information
- Full name: Aleksei Aleksandrovich Bobrov
- Date of birth: 27 March 1972 (age 54)
- Place of birth: Moscow, Russian SFSR
- Height: 1.78 m (5 ft 10 in)
- Positions: Forward; midfielder

Youth career
- SDYuShOR-3 Sovetskogo Rayona Moscow

Senior career*
Years	Team	Apps	(Gls)
1989–1992	PFC CSKA Moscow	6	(0)
1990–1992	→ PFC CSKA-d Moscow	33	(3)
1993	FC Lada Togliatti	34	(7)
1994	PFC CSKA Moscow	6	(0)
1994	→ PFC CSKA-d Moscow	10	(2)
1994	FC Rostselmash Rostov-on-Don	2	(0)
1995–1998	FC Lada Dimitrovgrad	141	(30)
1999	FC Shinnik Yaroslavl	12	(0)
2000–2001	FC Lada Togliatti	48	(6)
2001–2002	FC KAMAZ Naberezhnye Chelny	19	(1)
2002	FC Svetotekhnika Saransk	9	(1)
2003	FC Reutov	17	(0)
2003–2004	FC Luch-Energiya Vladivostok	28	(2)
2005–2006	FC Zvezda Serpukhov	61	(0)
- * Club domestic league appearances and goals

Aleksei Aleksandrovich Bobrov (Russian: Алексей Александрович Бобров; born 27 March 1972) is a former Russian professional footballer.

== Club career ==
He made his professional debut in the Soviet Second League B in 1990 for PFC CSKA-2 Moscow.

== Honours ==
- Russian Cup finalist: 1994.
