= Mikhail Davydov (footballer) =

Russian footballer (born 1972)

Personal information
- Full name: Mikhail Veniaminovich Davydov
- Date of birth: 2 July 1972 (age 54)
- Height: 1.87 m (6 ft 1 1/2 in)
- Position: Defender

Youth career
- DYuSSh-8 Gorky

Senior career*
Years	Team	Apps	(Gls)
1990	FC Zvezda Moscow	8	(0)
1990–1992	FC Volgar Astrakhan	77	(14)
1993	FC Gornyak	21	(0)
1993–1995	FC Lokomotiv Nizhny Novgorod	15	(1)
1995	FC Torpedo Arzamas	21	(0)
1996	FC Lokomotiv Nizhny Novgorod	15	(0)
1996	FC Torpedo-Viktoriya Nizhny Novgorod (amateur)		
1997–1999	FC Torpedo-Viktoriya Nizhny Novgorod	69	(9)
1999	FC Vodnik Bor		
1999	FC Neftekhimik Nizhnekamsk	8	(0)
2000	FC Svetotekhnika Saransk	5	(0)
2001–2002	FC Start Yasentsy		
2002	FC Gornyak		
2002	FC Lokomotiv-NN Nizhny Novgorod (amateur)		
2005–2008	FC Volna Balakhna		
2009	FC KiT Nizhny Novgorod		
- * Club domestic league appearances and goals

Mikhail Veniaminovich Davydov (Russian: Михаил Вениаминович Давыдов; born 2 July 1972) is a Russian former professional footballer.

== Honours ==
Gornyak

- Kazakhstan Premier League bronze: 1993
