= Yuri Moiseyev (footballer) =

Russian footballer and coach

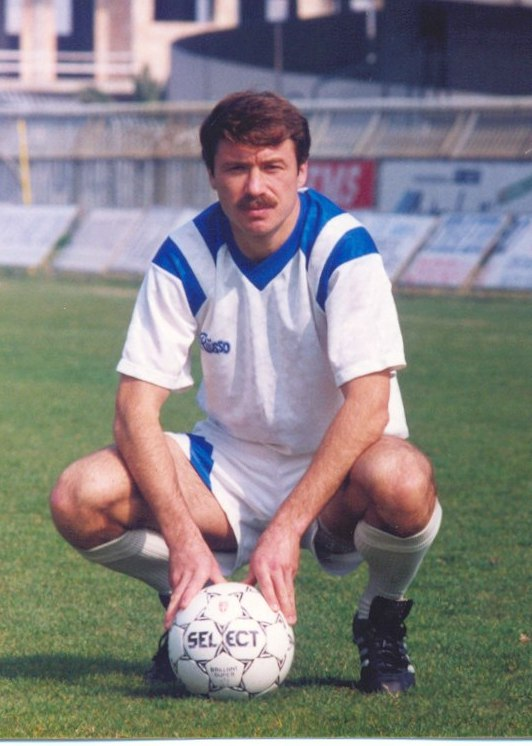

Personal information
- Full name: Yuri Alekseyevich Moiseyev
- Date of birth: 15 December 1960 (age 65)
- Place of birth: Stalinogorsk, Soviet Union
- Height: 1.82 m (5 ft 11 1/2 in)
- Position: Forward

Senior career*
Years	Team	Apps	(Gls)
1978–1980	FC Khimik Novomoskovsk	49	(7)
1980	FC Azot Novomoskovsk		
1981	FC Spartak Moscow	0	(0)
1981–1982	FC TOZ Tula	13	(3)
1982–1984	FC Khimik Novomoskovsk (amateur)		
1985–1990	FC Spartak Kostroma	183	(57)
1990–1992	FC Shinnik Yaroslavl	84	(17)
1993	FC Okean Nakhodka	27	(7)
1994	FC Lokomotiv Nizhny Novgorod	19	(4)
1995–1998	FC Don Novomoskovsk	138	(36)

Managerial career
- 2005: FC Don Novomoskovsk
- * Club domestic league appearances and goals

Yuri Alekseyevich Moiseyev (Russian: Юрий Алексеевич Моисеев; born 15 December 1960) is a Russian professional football coach and a former player.

== Club career ==
He made his professional debut in the Soviet Second League in 1978 for FC Khimik Novomoskovsk.
