= Aramais Yepiskoposyan =

Armenian-Russian footballer

Personal information
- Date of birth: 27 September 1968 (age 58)
- Height: 1.75 m (5 ft 9 in)
- Position: Midfielder

Senior career*
Years	Team	Apps	(Gls)
1986–1991	FC Ararat Yerevan	10	(0)
1992–1997	FC Chernomorets Novorossiysk	164	(8)
1997	FC Kuban Krasnodar	8	(0)
1999–2000	FC Irtysh Pavlodar	26	(2)
2000	FC Spartak Anapa (amateur)		

International career
1997	Armenia	1	(0)
- * Club domestic league appearances and goals

Aramais Yepiskoposyan (Armenian: Արամայիս Սուրենի Եպիսկոպոսյան; born 27 September 1968) is a former Armenian professional football player. He also holds Russian citizenship.

== Honours ==
- Kazakhstan Premier League champion: 1999.
