= Yuri Bavykin =

Russian footballer

Personal information
- Full name: Yuri Ivanovich Bavykin
- Date of birth: 31 March 1973 (age 53)
- Place of birth: Belgorod, Russian SFSR
- Height: 1.75 m (5 ft 9 in)
- Positions: Defender; midfielder

Team information
- Current team: FC Neftekhimik Nizhnekamsk (asst coach)

Youth career
- FShM Moscow
- FC Salyut Belgorod

Senior career*
Years	Team	Apps	(Gls)
1989	FC Salyut Belgorod	2	(0)
1989–1992	PFC CSKA Moscow	19	(0)
1993	FC Lada Togliatti	42	(17)
1994	PFC CSKA Moscow	6	(1)
1994–1996	FC Lada Togliatti	62	(7)
1996–1997	FC Lokomotiv Nizhny Novgorod	23	(3)
1997–1998	FC Lada Togliatti	44	(10)
1998	FC Krylia Sovetov Samara	14	(1)
1999	FC Baltika Kaliningrad	20	(1)
2000–2003	FC Sokol Saratov	94	(6)
2004	FC Chernomorets Novorossiysk	19	(0)
2004	FC Lisma-Mordovia Saransk	17	(1)
2005	FC Spartak-MZhK Ryazan	2	(0)

International career
1992	USSR U-21	2	(0)
1994	Russia U-21	3	(1)

Managerial career
- 2008–2009: FC Dynamo Moscow (youth team)
- 2010: FC Dynamo Bryansk (director)
- 2013: FC Fakel Voronezh (director)
- 2015–2017: FC Spartak-2 Moscow (director)
- 2017–2019: Russia U-21 (director)
- 2019: FC Dynamo Moscow (U20 assistant)
- 2019–2020: FC Dynamo Moscow (assistant)
- 2021–: FC Neftekhimik Nizhnekamsk (assistant)
- * Club domestic league appearances and goals

Yuri Ivanovich Bavykin (Russian: Юрий Иванович Бавыкин; born 31 March 1973) is a Russian professional football coach and a former player. He is an assistant coach with FC Neftekhimik Nizhnekamsk.

== Club career ==
He made his debut in the Russian Premier League in 1992 for PFC CSKA Moscow. He played 1 game in the UEFA Champions League 1992–93 for PFC CSKA Moscow.

From 2005 to 2008, he worked as a referee, reaching Russian Second Division level in 2008.

== Honours ==
- Soviet Cup winner: 1991.
- Soviet Cup finalist: 1992.
- Russian Cup finalist: 1993, 1994.
