= Yevgeni Plotnikov =

Russian footballer

Personal information
- Full name: Yevgeni Anatolyevich Plotnikov
- Date of birth: 6 September 1972 (age 54)
- Place of birth: Krasnodar, Russian SFSR
- Height: 1.92 m (6 ft 4 in)
- Position: Goalkeeper

Youth career
- 1989–1990: Kuban Krasnodar

Senior career*
Years	Team	Apps	(Gls)
1990–1991	Kuban Krasnodar	44	(0)
1992	Spartak Moscow	0	(0)
1992	Kuban Krasnodar	23	(0)
1993–1996	CSKA Moscow	64	(0)
1996–1997	Albacete	8	(0)
1998	Arsenal Tula	20	(0)
1999	Dynamo Moscow	20	(0)
2000	Amkar Perm	35	(0)
2001–2003	Sokol Saratov	41	(0)
2004	Vityaz Podolsk	5	(0)
2004	MTZ-RIPO Minsk	9	(0)
2005	Zhenis Astana	26	(0)
2006	Reutov	16	(0)

International career
1992	USSR U-21	3	(0)
1992–1994	Russia U-21	11	(0)

Managerial career
- 2007–2015: Dynamo Moscow (reserves GK coach)
- 2015: Kuban Krasnodar (GK coach)
- 2017: Dynamo-2 Moscow (GK coach)
- 2017–2019: Dynamo Moscow (GK coach)
- 2021: Olimp-Dolgoprudny (GK coach)
- 2021–2022: Rotor Volgograd (GK coach)
- * Club domestic league appearances and goals

Yevgeni Anatolyevich Plotnikov (Russian: Евгений Анатольевич Плотников; born 6 September 1972) is a Russian professional football coach and a former player.

== Club career ==
He played 3 games in the UEFA Champions League 1992–93 for PFC CSKA Moscow.

== Honours ==
- Russian Cup finalist: 1993, 1994, 1999.
