= Andrei Murygin =

Russian footballer

Personal information
- Full name: Andrei Lvovich Murygin
- Date of birth: 5 February 1962 (age 64)
- Height: 1.71 m (5 ft 7 1/2 in)
- Positions: Defender; midfielder

Senior career*
Years	Team	Apps	(Gls)
1979–1990	FC Dynamo Vologda	314	(47)
1990	FC Khimik Cherepovets	11	(1)
1991–1994	FC Zhemchuzhina Sochi	104	(25)
1995	FC Dynamo Vologda	36	(7)
1996	FC Chkalovets Novosibirsk	32	(2)
1997–1999	FC Dynamo Vologda	93	(11)
- * Club domestic league appearances and goals

Andrei Lvovich Murygin (Russian: Андрей Львович Мурыгин; born 5 February 1962) is a former Russian football player.
