= Matrosovo =

- IATA: none; ICAO: XHST

Summary
- Airport type: Military
- Location: Leonidovo
- Elevation AMSL: 335 ft / 102 m
- Coordinates: 49°24′6″N 142°53′0″E
- Interactive map of Matrosovo

Runways
| Direction | Length | | Surface |
| Direction | ft | m | Surface |
|---|---|---|---|
| 17/35 | 11,483 | 3,500 | Dirt |

Matrosovo is a former airport, likely air base, on Sakhalin Island, Russia located 14 km north of Leonidovo. It served as a dispersal airfield for military aircraft on Sakhalin Island during the Cold War.

Matrosovo was identified by U.S. photographic reconnaissance satellites around 1962. The Central Intelligence Agency's collection of declassified documents do not show that any aircraft were ever observed at this airfield, and no documents after 1970 reference the airfield.

In 1985 a Tupolev Tu-16 from Khorol crashed at or near this airfield. Matrosovo was not used after the Cold War and has fallen into a state of decay.
