= Sergey Kuznetsov (footballer, born 1966) =

Russian footballer

Personal information
- Full name: Sergey Alekseyevich Kuznetsov
- Date of birth: 12 May 1966 (age 60)
- Place of birth: Tambov, Russian SFSR
- Height: 1.87 m (6 ft 1 1/2 in)
- Position: Defender

Senior career*
Years	Team	Apps	(Gls)
1984	FC Spartak Tambov	29	(0)
1985–1986	FC SKA Rostov-on-Don	12	(0)
1987–1989	FC Rotor Volgograd	78	(3)
1990	FC Torpedo Volzhsky	8	(0)
1990	Tornion Tarmo (Finland)	?	(9)
1991	Kemin Pallotoverit-85 (Finland)	?	(2)
1992	TP-47	?	(5)
1992–1993	FC Rotor Volgograd	8	(0)
1994	FC Krylia Sovetov Samara	2	(0)
1994–1995	PFC Shumen	9	(0)
1995	FC Vodnik Kalachyov		
1999	Kemin Pallotoverit-85 (Finland)	5	(0)

Managerial career
- 2007: FC Rotor Volgograd (administrator)
- 2007: FC Rotor Volgograd (director)
- 2008: FC Rotor Volgograd (assistant)
- * Club domestic league appearances and goals

Sergey Alekseyevich Kuznetsov (Russian: Серге́й Алексеевич Кузнецов; born 12 May 1966) is a Russian professional football coach and a former player. He made his professional debut in the Soviet Second League in 1984 for FC Spartak Tambov. Kuznetsov is the first Russian to play in the Bulgarian A PFG.

== Honours ==
- Russian Premier League runner-up: 1993.
