= Leonidovo (air base) =

- IATA: none; ICAO: none

Summary
- Airport type: Prob. abandoned
- Operator: Soviet Naval Aviation
- Location: Leonidovo
- Elevation AMSL: 59 ft / 18 m
- Coordinates: 49°16′24″N 142°55′42″E
- Interactive map of Leonidovo

Runways
| Direction | Length | | Surface |
| Direction | ft | m | Surface |
|---|---|---|---|
| 01/19 | 8,481 | 2,585 | Concrete |

Leonidovo was a Soviet Naval Aviation reserve airfield in the remote central area of Sakhalin, Russia located 5 km (3 mi) east of Leonidovo. Declassified KH-7 imagery obtained from the U.S. Geological Survey shows that it existed in June 1966 without much difference compared to today. In recent times (probably 1990s) it was shortened to 2000 m. High-resolution Google Earth imagery shows that the airfield has been decommissioned, with the 2 km (1 mi) runway being used as a storage pad for petroleum industry supplies.

Satellite observation of Leonidovo in October 1964 indicated construction at the north and south ends of the runway. In 1967 there was an "unusual deployment" of 37 medium-range Tupolev Tu-16 Badgers at the airfield.

== See also ==
- Matrosovo
