= Andrei Pocheptsov =

Russian footballer and coach

Personal information
- Full name: Andrei Viktorovich Pocheptsov
- Date of birth: 1 June 1968 (age 58)
- Place of birth: Leningrad, Russian SFSR
- Height: 1.70 m (5 ft 7 in)
- Position: Defender

Youth career
- Smena Leningrad

Senior career*
Years	Team	Apps	(Gls)
1985–1986	FC Zenit Leningrad	0	(0)
1988	FC Dynamo Leningrad	0	(0)
1989	FC Zenit Leningrad	0	(0)
1990–1992	FC Dynamo Leningrad	102	(25)
1993–1994	FC Zhemchuzhina Sochi	50	(1)
1993	→ FC Torpedo Adler	2	(0)
1995	FC Saturn-1991 St. Petersburg	40	(0)
1996–1997	FC Gatchina	53	(1)
1997–1999	FC Dynamo St. Petersburg	92	(11)
2000–2003	FC Severstal Cherepovets	109	(14)

Managerial career
- 2003–2009: FC Sheksna Cherepovets (assistant)
- 2009–2022: FC Zenit Saint Petersburg (academy)
- 2022–2023: FC Zenit-2 Saint Petersburg (assistant)
- 2023–2024: FC Zenit-2 Saint Petersburg
- * Club domestic league appearances and goals

Andrei Viktorovich Pocheptsov (Russian: Андрей Викторович Почепцов; born 1 June 1968) is a Russian professional football coach and a former player. He is the manager of FC Zenit-2 Saint Petersburg.

== Club career ==
He made his professional debut in the Soviet Second League B in 1990 for FC Dynamo Leningrad.

He played for FC Zenit Leningrad in the Soviet Cup and USSR Federation Cup.
