= Roman Meleshko =

Ukrainian footballer

Personal information
- Full name: Roman Ivanovych Meleshko
- Date of birth: 8 September 1971 (age 55)
- Place of birth: Zaporizhia, Ukrainian SSR
- Height: 1.82 m (5 ft 11 1/2 in)
- Position: Midfielder

Youth career
- 1988–1990: Dnepr Dnepropetrovsk

Senior career*
| Years | Team | Apps | (Gls) |
| 1989–1990 | Dnepr Dnepropetrovsk | 0 | (0) |
| 1991 | Metallurg Zaporozhye | 0 | (0) |
| 1991 | Baltika Kaliningrad | 21 | (1) |
| 1992 | Vedrich Rechitsa | 15 | (1) |
| 1992 | Dinamo Minsk | 11 | (2) |
| 1993 | Spartak Vladikavkaz | 22 | (0) |
| 1994 | MPKC Mozyr | 27 | (12) |
| 1994 | → Fandok Bobruisk (loan) | 2 | (1) |
| 1995–1996 | Zorya-MALS Luhansk | 2 | (0) |
| 1997 | Fabus Bronnitsy | 0 | (0) |
| 1997 | Spartak Lukhovitsy | 2 | (1) |
- * Club domestic league appearances and goals

Roman Ivanovych Meleshko (Ukrainian: Роман Іванович Мелешко; born 8 September 1971) is a former Ukrainian football player.

== Honours ==
Dnipro Dnipropetrovsk

- USSR Federation Cup winner: 1989
- USSR Federation Cup runner-up: 1990

Dinamo Minsk

- Belarusian Premier League champion: 1992–93
