= Vladimir Semyonov (footballer) =

Russian footballer

Personal information
- Full name: Vladimir Viktorovich Semyonov
- Date of birth: 25 June 1972 (age 54)
- Place of birth: Omsk, Russian SFSR
- Height: 1.73 m (5 ft 8 in)
- Position: Midfielder

Youth career
- Kuzbass-UOR Leninsk-Kuznetsky

Senior career*
Years	Team	Apps	(Gls)
1990–1992	FC Zarya Leninsk-Kuznetsky	86	(12)
1993–1994	PFC CSKA Moscow	6	(0)
1993–1994	→ PFC CSKA-d Moscow (loans)	46	(3)
1995	FC Dynamo Moscow	9	(0)
1995	→ FC Dynamo-d Moscow (loan)	12	(0)
1996–1997	FC Sokol-PZhD Saratov	56	(3)
1998	FC Metallurg Lipetsk	41	(0)
1999	FC Arsenal Tula	32	(3)
2000–2001	FC Torpedo-ZIL Moscow	41	(3)
2001–2002	FC Rubin Kazan	26	(2)
2002	FC Irtysh Omsk	5	(0)
2003–2004	FC Salyut-Energia Belgorod	44	(0)
2003	→ FC Salyut-Energia-2 Belgorod (loan)		

International career
1993	Russia U-21	2	(0)
- * Club domestic league appearances and goals

Vladimir Viktorovich Semyonov (Russian: Владимир Викторович Семёнов; born 25 June 1972) is a Russian former football player.
