= Aleksandr Fyodorov (footballer, born 1965) =

Russian footballer

Personal information
- Full name: Aleksandr Aleksandrovich Fyodorov
- Date of birth: 15 May 1965 (age 61)
- Height: 1.78 m (5 ft 10 in)
- Position: Defender

Youth career
- DYuSSh-3 Vologda

Senior career*
Years	Team	Apps	(Gls)
1983–1991	FC Dynamo Vologda	279	(14)
1992–1993	FC Zhemchuzhina Sochi	27	(0)
1993	→ FC Torpedo Adler (loan)	5	(0)
1993–1994	Perlis FA		
1994–1996	FC Chkalovets Novosibirsk	83	(8)
1997–1998	FC Lokomotiv St. Petersburg	104	(12)
2000–2002	FC Dynamo Vologda	103	(3)
2008	FC Dynamo-2 Vologda		
2010–2012	LFK Dynamo Vologda		
2013	FC SKDM Vologda		
- * Club domestic league appearances and goals

Aleksandr Aleksandrovich Fyodorov (Russian: Александр Александрович Фёдоров; born 15 May 1965) is a former Russian football player.
