= Kirill Varaksin =

Russian footballer

Personal information
- Full name: Kirill Aleksandrovich Varaksin
- Date of birth: 3 August 1974 (age 52)
- Height: 1.98 m (6 ft 6 in)
- Positions: Striker; midfielder

Senior career*
Years	Team	Apps	(Gls)
1992–1994	FC Metalurh Zaporizhzhia	23	(2)
1994	Chernomorets Novorossiysk	3	(0)
1994	FC KAMAZ Naberezhnye Chelny	8	(1)
1995	Yukong Elephants	7	(1)
1995–1996	PFC CSKA-d Moscow	14	(0)
1997–1998	K. Sint-Niklase S.K.E.	6	(0)
1998–1999	SV Wilhelmshaven		
1999–2000	1. FC Saarbrücken	2	(0)
2001–2002	FK Rīga	16	(3)
2003–2004	FK Jūrmala	26	(7)
- * Club domestic league appearances and goals

Kirill Aleksandrovich Varaksin (Russian: Кирилл Александрович Вараксин; born 3 August 1974) is a Latvian and Russian former professional footballer who played as striker or midfielder.

== Career ==
He played for Jeju United then known as Yukong Elephants, in the K League
