= Sergei Ragulin =

Russian footballer

Personal information
- Full name: Sergei Vyacheslavovich Ragulin
- Date of birth: 10 January 1967 (age 59)
- Place of birth: Moscow, Russian SFSR
- Height: 1.78 m (5 ft 10 in)
- Position: Defender

Youth career
- EShVSM Moscow

Senior career*
Years	Team	Apps	(Gls)
1983	FShM Moscow	0	(0)
1984	Lokomotiv Moscow	0	(0)
1985	FC Lokomotiv Chelyabinsk	9	(0)
1985	Lokomotiv Moscow	4	(0)
1986	Iskra Smolensk	0	(0)
1986–1988	Obuvshchik Lida		
1989	Geolog Tyumen	39	(0)
1990	Torpedo Moscow	0	(0)
1990–1991	Geolog Tyumen	75	(0)
1992–1996	Lokomotiv Nizhny Novgorod	129	(0)
1997	Torpedo Arzamas	18	(0)
1998–2003	Spartak Shchyolkovo	180	(0)
- * Club domestic league appearances and goals

Sergei Vyacheslavovich Ragulin (Russian: Серге́й Вячеславович Рагулин; born 10 January 1967) is a former Russian professional footballer.

== Club career ==
He made his professional debut in the Soviet Second League in 1985 for FC Lokomotiv Chelyabinsk.
