= Yevgeni Titov =

Russian footballer

Personal information
- Date of birth: 13 February 1964
- Date of death: 27 February 2015 (aged 51)
- Place of death: Kostroma, Russia
- Height: 1.70 m (5 ft 7 in)
- Positions: Midfielder; forward

Senior career*
Years	Team	Apps	(Gls)
1981–1985	FC Stroitel Cherepovets	118	(10)
1987–1988	FC Dynamo Vologda	53	(15)
1989–1992	FC Gekris Novorossiysk	137	(50)
1993–1994	FC Zhemchuzhina Sochi	15	(4)
1994	FC Chernomorets Novorossiysk	15	(3)
1994	FC Ilves	1	(0)
- * Club domestic league appearances and goals

Yevgeni Albertovich Titov (Russian: Евгений Альбертович Титов; 13 February 1964 – 27 February 2015) was a Russian professional footballer.

Titov played in the Russian Premier League with FC Zhemchuzhina Sochi.
