= Vladimir Tatarchuk (footballer, born 1966) =

Russian footballer (born 1966)

Personal information
- Full name: Vladimir Iosifovich Tatarchuk
- Date of birth: 25 April 1966 (age 60)
- Place of birth: Matrosovo, Russian SFSR
- Height: 1.70 m (5 ft 7 in)
- Position: Midfielder

Youth career
- CSKA-2 Moscow

Senior career*
Years	Team	Apps	(Gls)
1983–1984	SKA-Karpaty Lviv	12	(0)
1984	FC Dynamo Kyiv	0	(0)
1985–1991	CSKA Moscow	197	(42)
1992–1994	Slavia Prague	47	(8)
1994	PFC CSKA Moscow	8	(0)
1995	Al-Ittihad Jeddah		
1996	FC Dynamo-Gazovik Tyumen	11	(3)
1997	FC Tyumen	20	(0)
1998–1999	FC Lokomotiv Nizhny Novgorod	56	(2)
2000	FC Sokol-Saratov	5	(1)
2000	FC Metallurg Krasnoyarsk	6	(0)
2001	FK Liepājas Metalurgs	19	(2)
2002	FC Shatura		

International career
1986–1988	USSR (Olympic)	10	(0)
1987–1991	USSR	10	(1)
1992–1994	Russia	7	(0)

Managerial career
- 2002–2003: PFC CSKA Moscow (youth teams)
- 2003: FC Krasny Oktyabr Moscow
Medal record
Representing the Soviet Union
Men's football
Gold medal – first place	1988 Seoul	Team
- * Club domestic league appearances and goals

Vladimir Iosifovich Tatarchuk (Russian: Владимир Иосифович Татарчук, Ukrainian: Володимир Йосипович Татарчук; born 25 April 1966) is a Russian former footballer who played as a midfielder. He represented the USSR and Russia national teams at international level. His son Vladimir Tatarchuk Jr. is also a professional footballer.

== International career ==
Tatarchuk made his debut for USSR on 18 April 1987 in a friendly against Sweden. He played in the UEFA Euro 1992 and 1994 FIFA World Cup qualifiers, but was not selected for the final tournament squad for either. He scored a goal on 21 May 1991 at Wembley Stadium in a friendly against England.

== Honours ==
- Olympic champion: 1988.
- Soviet Top League winner: 1991
- Soviet Cup winner: 1991.
