= Gleb Panfyorov =

Russian footballer

Personal information
- Full name: Gleb Nikolayevich Panfyorov
- Date of birth: 29 May 1970 (age 56)
- Place of birth: Moscow, Russian SFSR
- Height: 1.78 m (5 ft 10 in)
- Position: Midfielder

Youth career
- Krasnaya Presnya Moscow

Senior career*
Years	Team	Apps	(Gls)
1986–1988	Spartak Moscow	0	(0)
1989–1990	CSKA Moscow	0	(0)
1989–1990	→ CSKA-2 Moscow	41	(8)
1990	SKA Rostov-on-Don	15	(4)
1991	Spartak Moscow	0	(0)
1991–1992	Asmaral Moscow	43	(2)
1992	→ Presnya Moscow	18	(8)
1992	Karelia Petrozavodsk	12	(4)
1993–1994	Asmaral Moscow	34	(3)
1994	KAMAZ Naberezhnye Chelny	15	(4)
1995–1996	Torpedo Moscow	32	(6)
1996	Zhemchuzhina Sochi	16	(3)
1997	Torpedo-ZIL Moscow	36	(16)
1997–1998	Fortuna Düsseldorf	9	(1)
1998	Torpedo-ZIL Moscow	22	(11)
1999	Dinamo Samarqand	7	(1)
2000	Ventspils	24	(7)
2001	Severstal Cherepovets	4	(0)
2001	Nosorogi Volodarsky		
2002	Krasnoznamensk	37	(18)
2003	Spartak Kostroma	34	(5)
2004	FC Serpukhov		
- * Club domestic league appearances and goals

Gleb Nikolayevich Panfyorov (Russian: Глеб Николаевич Панфёров; born 29 May 1970) is a former Russian professional footballer.

== Club career ==
He made his professional debut in the Soviet Second League in 1989 for FC Chayka-CSKA Moscow. He played for the main team of PFC CSKA Moscow in the USSR Federation Cup.

He made his Russian Premier League debut for FC Asmaral Moscow on 1 April 1992 in a game against FC Zenit Saint Petersburg. He also played in the Russian Premier League for FC KAMAZ Naberezhnye Chelny, FC Torpedo Moscow and FC Zhemchuzhina Sochi.

== Honours ==
- Latvian Higher League runner-up: 2000.
