= FC Digora =

Russian football club

- Full name: Football Club Digora
- Founded: 1993
- League: North Ossetia-Alania Championship
- 2008: 2nd

FC Digora (Russian: «Дигора») is a Russian football team from Digora. It played professionally for one season in 1996, taking 18th place in Zone 1 of the Russian Third League.

== Team name history ==
- 1993 FC Atlant Digora
- 1994–2005 FC Gofrokarton Digora
- 2005–present FC Digora
