= KAMAZ Stadium =

Stadium in Naberezhnye Chelny, Tatarstan, Russia

Coordinates: 55°43′55.48″N 52°25′04.15″E

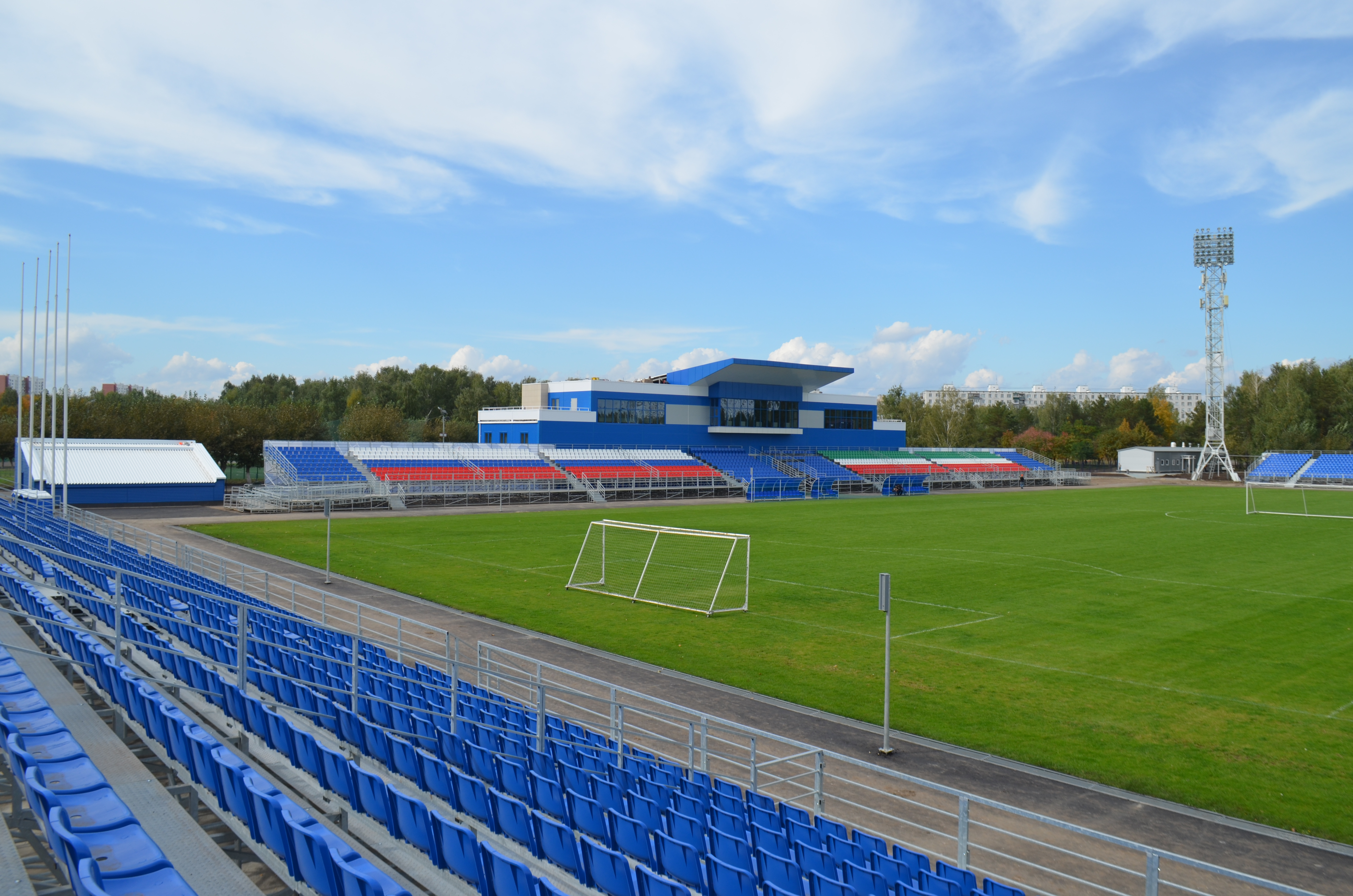
KAMAZ Stadium

KAMAZ Stadium is a multi-purpose stadium in Naberezhnye Chelny, Russia. It is currently used mostly for football matches and is the home stadium of FC KAMAZ Naberezhnye Chelny. The stadium was built in 1977 and after reconstruction in 2016 holds 6,248 people.
