= Vladislav Lemish =

Azerbaijani footballer (1970–2021)

Personal information
- Full name: Vladislav Yuryevich Lemish
- Date of birth: 20 August 1970
- Place of birth: Baku, Azerbaijani SSR
- Date of death: 30 September 2021 (aged 51)
- Place of death: Baku, Azerbaijan
- Height: 1.74 m (5 ft 9 in)
- Position: Forward

Youth career
- 1987–1988: Neftchi Baku

Senior career*
Years	Team	Apps	(Gls)
1988–1989	Neftchi Baku	15	(0)
1990–1992	Kuban Krasnodar	60	(20)
1992	Torpedo Moscow	0	(0)
1992	Kuban Krasnodar	15	(5)
1992–1993	Espanyol	0	(0)
1992–1993	→ Palamós (loan)	26	(2)
1994	CSKA Moscow	5	(0)
1994	Kuban Krasnodar	3	(0)
1995	Monolit Novotatarovskaya	13	(10)
1995	Izumrud Timashyovsk	8	(4)
1996	Druzhba Maykop	35	(11)
1997	Dynamo Stavropol	14	(6)
1997	Baltika Kaliningrad	7	(0)
1998	Slavia Mozyr	4	(1)

International career
1987	Soviet Union U16		
1992	Russia	1	(0)
1994	Azerbaijan	1	(0)
- * Club domestic league appearances and goals

Vladislav Yuryevich Lemish (Russian: Владислав Юрьевич Лемиш, Azerbaijani: latin: Vladislav Yuryeviç Lemiş, Azerbaijani: cyrillic: Владислав Јурјевич Лемиш; 20 August 1970 – 30 September 2021) was an Azerbaijani professional footballer who played as a forward.

== International career ==
Lemish played one game for the Russia national team on 16 August 1992, when he came on as a substitute for the last ten minutes of a friendly match against Mexico. That was the first game Russia played under its name after the break-up of Soviet Union. He later played a game for the Azerbaijan national team.
