= Aleksei Guschin =

Russian footballer

Personal information
- Full name: Aleksei Anatolievich Guschin
- Date of birth: 21 October 1971 (age 55)
- Place of birth: Moscow, Russian SFSR
- Height: 1.76 m (5 ft 9 in)
- Position: Defender

Youth career
- CSKA Moscow

Senior career*
Years	Team	Apps	(Gls)
1989–1995	CSKA Moscow	66	(0)
1996	Dynamo Moscow	14	(0)
1997–1999	Rostselmash Rostov-on-Don	87	(0)
2000–2001	Torpedo-ZIL Moscow	21	(0)
2002	Volgar‑Gazprom Astrakhan	31	(0)

International career
1991	USSR U20	3	(0)
1992	USSR U21	4	(0)
1992–1994	Russia U21	14	(0)
- * Club domestic league appearances and goals

Aleksei Anatolievich Guschin (Russian: Алексей Анатольевич Гущин; born 21 October 1971) is a Russian former football defender.

He capped for USSR U-20 team at 1991 FIFA World Youth Championship.
