= Dmitri Shoukov =

Russian footballer

Personal information
- Full name: Dmitri Vladislavovich Shoukov
- Date of birth: 26 September 1975 (age 51)
- Place of birth: Samara, Russian SFSR
- Height: 1.81 m (5 ft 11 in)
- Position: Midfielder

Senior career*
Years	Team	Apps	(Gls)
1992–1995	PFC CSKA-d Moscow	72	(5)
1993–1995	PFC CSKA Moscow	31	(1)
1995–1998	Vitesse Arnhem	56	(6)
1999	NAC Breda	21	(6)
1999–2004	Willem II Tilburg	137	(25)
2004–2007	FC Twente	37	(4)

International career
1995–1998	Russia U-21	16	(1)

Managerial career
- 2010–2011: PFC Krylia Sovetov Samara (assistant)
- 2011–2012: PFC Krylia Sovetov Samara (academy)
- 2013–2014: PFC Krylia Sovetov Samara (assistant)
- 2014–2015: Konoplyov football academy
- 2016: FC Lada-Tolyatti (assistant)
- 2018–2020: PFC Krylia Sovetov Samara (academy)
- 2020–2021: Konoplyov football academy
- 2021–2024: PFC Krylia Sovetov Samara (U-19)
- 2024–2025: FC Krylia Sovetov-2 Samara
- * Club domestic league appearances and goals

Dmitri Vladislavovich Shoukov (Russian: Дмитрий Владиславович Шуков; born 26 September 1975) is a Russian football coach and a former player. His position on the field was right winger, he could also play as a forward. He also holds Dutch citizenship.

== Playing career ==
Shoukov began his career in 1993 at PFC CSKA Moscow. In 1995, he made change to go play in the Netherlands for Vitesse Arnhem. After one season he went to play for NAC then he moved to Willem II in 1999. On 20 January 2004 he came to play for FC Twente. He retired in January 2007.

== Honours ==
- Russian Cup finalist: 1994.

== European club competitions ==
- UEFA Cup Winners' Cup 1994–95 with PFC CSKA Moscow: 2 games.
- UEFA Cup 1998–99 with Vitesse: 1 game.
- UEFA Champions League 1999–2000 with Willem II Tilburg: 5 games, 1 goal.
- UEFA Cup 2006–07 with FC Twente: 1 game.
