= FC Buran Voronezh =

- Full name: Football Club Buran Voronezh
- Founded: 1954
- Dissolved: 1993

FC Buran Voronezh (Russian: «Буран» Воронеж) was a Russian football team from Voronezh. It played professionally in 1990 and 1991 in the Soviet Second League B.

== Team name history ==
- 1954–1958: FC Krylia Sovetov-2 Voronezh
- 1959–1962: FC Trud-klubnaya Voronezh
- 1963–1967: FC Mashinostroitel Voronezh
- 1968–1976: FC Zenit Voronezh
- 1977–1993: FC Buran Voronezh
