= FC Zvezda Serpukhov =

Russian football club

- Full name: Football Club Zvezda Serpukhov
- Founded: 2006
- Ground: Trud
- Chairman: Boris Goryachkin
- Manager: Aleksandr Sakharov (caretaker)
- League: Amateur Football League
- 2009: Russian Second Division, Zone Center, 10th
Home colours	Away colours

FC Zvezda Serpukhov (Russian: ФК «Звезда» Серпухов) is a Russian football club from Serpukhov.

== History ==
It was founded in 2006 by merger of Serpukhov clubs FC Lokomotiv-M (2002–2005) and FC Serpukhov (1999–2005). Zvezda played in Russian Second Division (Center zone) in 2006–2009. Since 2010 it plays in amateur Russian championship (Moscow oblast zone, group A).

Another Serpukhov club existed in the past was also named Zvezda in some part of its history (its names: Serpukhov town team – 1961–1962, Zvezda – 1963–1967, Avangard – 1968–1969); it played in Soviet lower leagues. Current club declares itself legatee of historical club heritage.
