= FC Elista =

Uralan Elista
- Full name: Football Club Uralan Elista
- Founded: 1958; 68 years ago 2005; 21 years ago 2014; 12 years ago 2021; 5 years ago
- Dissolved: 2004; 22 years ago 2006; 20 years ago 2015; 11 years ago
- Ground: Stadion Uralan, Elista
- Capacity: 10,300
- Chairman: Maxim Tyumidov
- Manager: Anatoly Mikhailichenlo
- League: Russian Amateur Football League, Zone South
- 2014 in Russian football: Russian Amateur Football League, South zone
Home colours	Away colours

FC Uralan Elista (Russian: ФК Уралан Элиста) is a football club based in Elista, Kalmykia, Russia.

== History ==
FC Elista was founded in 2005 following the dissolution of its predecessor, FC Uralan Elista. The club entered South zone of the Amateur Football League and finished second. That result was not enough to warrant automatic promotion, but the extension of the South zone of the Russian Second Division allowed Elista to move one level up. In 2006 FC Elista withdrew from the competition after 18 rounds. The club was restarted in 2014, as FC Uralan Elista in the Russian Amateur Football League.

Colours are (Home) all blue. (Away) Either yellow shirts with blue arms, yellow shorts or all black.

=== FC Uralan Elista ===
Football Club Uralan Elista was founded in 1958 as a construction trust team. Uralan means "forward" in Kalmyk. The team have won Kalmyk championship and cup every year until 1965. In 1966, they were admitted to the B class of the Soviet league. The team played at the same level (call Soviet Second League since 1971) until 1991. Their best result was a second position in 1991.

Uralan played in the Russian First Division since 1992. They won the tournament in 1997 and were promoted to the Top Division. Their best result was seventh position in 1998. Uralan were relegated after finishing last in 2000, but won promotion back at the first time of asking. They spent another two seasons at top level before being relegated in 2003.

In the 2004 season, the club experienced financial problems. The players' wages were not paid for at least six months, this led to many of them leaving Uralan. The club was able to field only ten players for the league match on 7 July (including two goalkeepers, one of whom played as a striker) and only nine players on 24 July. However, Uralan managed to fulfill all fixtures.

Kirsan Ilyumzhinov was the honorary president of FC Uralan.

=== New club ===
Uralan was to be relegated to the Second Division, but refused to enter the competition on 22 March 2005. A new club, FC Elista, was formed in its place. 80 percent of Elista players were from reserve and youth teams of Uralan.

The club was restarted in 2014, as FC Uralan Elista in the Russian Amateur Football League, but folded in late 2015.

The club was reformed, again, in 2021, competing in the Russian third tier. .

=== Reserve squad ===
Uralan's reserve squad played professionally as FC Uralan-d Elista in the Russian Third League in 1994–1996.

== Notable players ==
Had international caps for their respective countries. Players whose names are listed in bold represented their countries while playing for Uralan/FC Elista.

Russia

- (Russia) (Kalmykia) Mingiyan Beveyev
- (Soviet Union) (Commonwealth of Independent States) (Ukraine) (Russia) Akhrik Tsveiba
- (Russia) Daur Akhvlediani
- (Russia) Maksim Bokov
- (Russia) **Igor Chugainov**
- (Russia) **Aleksandr Filimonov**
- (Russia) Denis Kolodin
- (Russia) Andrei Kondrashov
- (Russia) Oleg Kuzmin
- (Russia) **Alexey Smertin**
- (Russia) Oleg Veretennikov

Former USSR countries

- (Azerbaijan) Samir Aliyev
- (Armenia) Garnik Avalyan
- (Armenia) Tigran Petrosyan
- (Armenia) **Arthur Voskanyan**
- (Belarus) **Vital Bulyga**
- (Belarus) **Vyacheslav Geraschenko**
- (Belarus) Vital Lanko
- (Belarus) Alyaksandar Lukhvich
- (Belarus) Aliaksandr Oreshnikov
- (Belarus) Vadim Skripchenko
- (Belarus) Yuri Shukanov
- (Estonia) Mark Švets
- (Georgia (country)) **Valeri Abramidze**
- (Georgia (country)) Giorgi Davitnidze
- (Georgia (country)) Vasil Gigiadze
- (Georgia (country)) Sevasti Todua
- (Kazakhstan) **Vitaliy Abramov**
- (Kazakhstan) Yuri Aksenov
- (Kazakhstan) Dmitriy Lyapkin
- (Latvia) **Valērijs Ivanovs**
- (Latvia) **Aleksandrs Jelisejevs**
- (Lithuania) **Vidas Dancenka**
- (Lithuania) **Saulius Mikalajūnas**
- (Moldova) Vasile Coşelev
- (Moldova) **Vitalie Maevici**
- (Moldova) **Radu Rebeja**
- (Tajikistan) Arsen Avakov
- (Ukraine) Andriy Annenkov
- (Ukraine) Oleksiy Antyukhyn
- (Ukraine) Yuriy Hrytsyna
- (Ukraine) Oleksandr Kyryukhin
- (Ukraine) Pavlo Shkapenko
- (Ukraine) Artem Yashkin
- (Ukraine) (Russia) **Sergei Kormiltsev**
- (Uzbekistan) Sergey Lushan
- (Uzbekistan) **Aleksandr Sayun**

South America

- (Uruguay) Víctor López
- (Venezuela) Fernando Martínez
