= FC Reutov =

- Full name: Football Club Reutov
- Founded: 2001
- Dissolved: 2009
- Ground: Start Stadium
- League: Russian Second Division, Zone West
- 2008: 9th

Historical logo

FC Reutov (Russian: «Реутов» (Реутов)) was a Russian football team from Reutov. It played professionally from 2003 to 2008. Their best result was 4th place in the Zone West of the Russian Second Division in 2006. Football in Reutov was continued with FC Prialit Reutov, founded after FC Reutov was dissolved, in 2009.
