= FC Irgiz Balakovo =

- Full name: Football Club Irgiz Balakovo
- Founded: 1992
- Dissolved: 1994
- League: Russian Second Division, Zone Center
- 1994: Excluded after 8 games

FC Irgiz Balakovo (Russian: «Иргиз» (Балаково)) was a Russian football team from Balakovo. It played professionally from 1992 to 1994. Their best result was 3rd place in Zone 3 of the Russian Second Division in 1993.
