= FC Lokomotiv Nizhny Novgorod =

Lokomotiv
- Full name: Football Club Lokomotiv; Nizhny Novgorod
- Nickname: Zheleznodorozhniki (Railwaymen)
- Founded: 1916
- Dissolved: 2019
- Ground: Lokomotiv Stadium, Nizhny Novgorod
- Capacity: 17,856
- Manager: Alexander Vlasov
- League: Russian Amateur Football League
- 2019: Russian Amateur Football League, Privolzhie zone, 6th
- Website: http://fclnn.ru/
Home colours	Away colours

FC Lokomotiv Nizhny Novgorod was a Russian football club based in Nizhny Novgorod. They spent eight seasons in the Russian Premier League.

== History ==
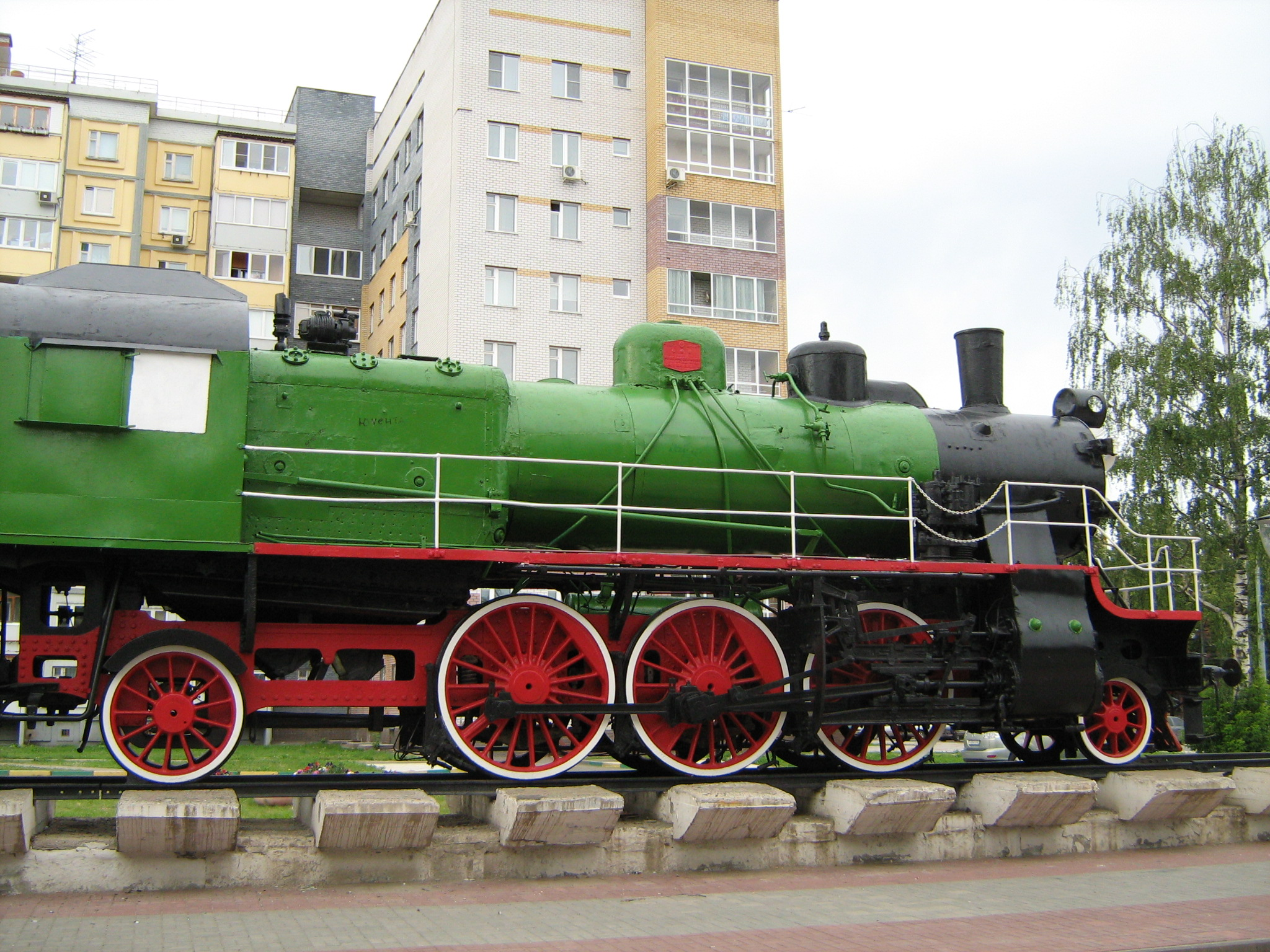
A historic steam locomotive celebrates Nizhny Novgorod's railway legacy

=== Early years ===
The team of the railway workers was founded in Nizhny Novgorod in 1916. Later it was known as Chervonka (1918–1922), Spartak (1923–1930), Tyaga (1931), Zheleznodorozhniki (1932–1935). In 1936 the team was renamed Lokomotiv and retained this name until 2002 when it was renamed Lokomotiv-NN. During the existence of the USSR the club was a part of the Lokomotiv Voluntary Sports Society.

=== Modern Lokomotiv ===
Lokomotiv was mostly known for its football school and did not play in the Soviet league until 1987. In 1989, Lokomotiv won promotion to the First League and spent two years there.

In 1992, after the dissolution of USSR, Lokovotiv was entitled to enter the Russian Premier League and reached the best result in the club's history, a 6th position. Lokomotiv finished 8th in 1994 and 1996 before being relegated after the 1997 season, during which it reached the semifinal of the Intertoto Cup. However, the club won promotion back immediately and spent another two seasons in the Premier League (1999 and 2000). After finishing last in the 2001 First Division, the club was relegated. Before starting in the Second League it folded.

=== Lokomotiv-GZhD ===
In 2002, a new club Lokomotiv-GZhD was created by the Gorkiy Railways and sponsored by the Nizhniy Novgorod Oblast Administration entering the Amateur Football League. In 2002, Lokomotiv won promotion to the Second Division and played there until 2005. In 2006, the club was disbanded.

=== Lokomotiv-NN ===
On December 26, 2018, the Ministry of Justice of the Nizhny Novgorod Region registered the legal entity “Nizhny Novgorod City Public Organization Football Club Lokomotiv-NN”. For the season of 2019, the Lokomotiv-NN club announced at the Championship of Russia among exercise therapy (III division, Privolzhie zone), and in the 2019 championship of the region a second team remained to play, receiving a Balakhna registration. At the end of the first round in the MFS "Privolzhye" championship, the team withdrew from the competition.

== Honours ==
=== European ===
- European Railways Cup Winners (1): 1991

== Reserve squad ==
Lokomotiv's reserve squad played professionally as FC Lokomotiv-d Nizhny Novgorod in the Russian Third League in 1996–97.

== Notable past players ==
Had international caps for their respective countries. Players whose name is listed in bold represented their countries while playing for Lokomotiv.

- (Soviet Union) (Commonwealth of Independent States) (Russia) Dmitri Kuznetsov
- (Soviet Union) (Russia) Sergei Gorlukovich
- (Soviet Union) (Russia) Vladimir Tatarchuk
- (Soviet Union) (Ukraine) Ivan Hetsko
- (Commonwealth of Independent States) (Russia) **Dmitri Cheryshev**
- (Russia) Andrei Afanasyev
- (Russia) Pyotr Bystrov
- (Russia) Lyubomir Kantonistov
- (Russia) Yuri Matveyev
- (Russia) Gennadiy Nizhegorodov
- (Russia) Andrei Novosadov
- (Armenia) Andrey Movsisyan
- (Armenia) **Arthur Petrosyan**
- (Belarus) Alyaksandr Oreshnikow
- (Belarus) **Mikalay Ryndzyuk**
- (Belarus) **Andrei Satsunkevich**
- (Belarus) **Vladimir Sheleg**
- (Belarus) **Valer Shantalosau**
- (Georgia (country)) Kakhaber Gogichaishvili
- (Georgia (country)) Gocha Gogrichiani
- (Georgia (country)) Zurab Ionanidze
- (Georgia (country)) Zurab Popkhadze
- (Kazakhstan) Igor Avdeev
- (Kazakhstan) Aleksandr Familtsev
- (Kazakhstan) Ruslan Gumar
- (Kazakhstan) Sergey Timofeev
- (Kazakhstan) Arsen Tlekhugov
- (Kazakhstan) **Viktor Zubarev**
- (Kyrgyzstan) **Zakir Jalilov**
- (Kyrgyzstan) Nazim Adzhiyev
- (Latvia) **Aleksandrs Isakovs**
- (Lithuania) **Virginijus Baltušnikas**
- (Lithuania) Vidas Dančenka
- (Lithuania) **Darius Gvildys**
- (Lithuania) Vadimas Petrenko
- (Lithuania) Nerijus Vasiliauskas
- (Slovakia) Marek Hollý
- (Tajikistan) **Arsen Avakov**
- (Tajikistan) (Russia) Mukhsin Mukhamadiev
- (Tajikistan) **Rustam Khaidaraliyev**
- (Ukraine) Yuri Kalitvintsev
- (Ukraine) Yuri Moroz
- (Ukraine) Vladyslav Prudius
- (Uzbekistan) **Aleksandr Sayun**
- (Romania) **Mihai Drăguş**
