= 1993 PFC CSKA Moscow season =

CSKA
1993 season
- Manager: Gennadi Kostylev; Boris Kopeikin
- Stadium: Dynamo Stadium; Grigory Fedotov Stadium; Luzhniki Stadium; Light-Athletic Football Complex CSKA
- Top League: 10th
- Russian Cup: Runners-Up
- Russian Cup: Continued in 1994
- UEFA Champions League: Group Stage
- Top goalscorer: League: Two Players (8); All: Ilshat Faizulin (10)

The 1993 CSKA season was the club's second season in the newly formed Russian Top League, the highest tier of association football in Russia.

== Squad ==
As of match played 10 November 1993

Name	Nationality	Position	Date of birth (age)	Signed from	Signed in	Contract ends	Apps.	Goals
Goalkeepers
Aleksandr Guteyev	(Russia)	GK	18 June 1967 (aged 26)	Torpedo Moscow	1988		19	0
Andrei Novosadov	(Russia)	GK	27 March 1972 (aged 21)	KAMAZ	1993		0	0
Yevgeni Plotnikov	(Russia)	GK	6 September 1972 (aged 21)	Kuban Krasnodar	1993		30	0
Defenders
Yervand Krbachyan	(Armenia)	DF	1 October 1971 (aged 22)	Ararat Yerevan	1993		13	0
Yevgeni Bushmanov	(Russia)	DF	2 November 1971 (aged 22)	Spartak Moscow	1992		51	2
Dmitri Bystrov	(Russia)	DF	30 July 1967 (aged 26)	Lokomotiv Moscow	1986		32	1
Aleksei Guschin	(Russia)	DF	21 October 1971 (aged 22)	Trainee	1989		63	1
Mikhail Kupriyanov	(Russia)	DF	7 July 1973 (aged 20)	SKA Rostov-on-Don	1993		10	0
Sergei Mamchur	(Russia)	DF	3 February 1972 (aged 21)	Asmaral Moscow	1993		33	0
Valeri Minko	(Russia)	DF	8 August 1971 (aged 22)	Dynamo Barnaul	1989		56	6
Midfielders
Yuri Antonovich	(Belarus)	MF	2 June 1967 (aged 26)	Dinamo Minsk	1993		40	3
Aleksandr Grishin	(Russia)	MF	18 November 1971 (aged 21)	Lokomotiv Moscow	1989		55	21
Vasili Ivanov	(Russia)	MF	21 March 1970 (aged 23)	Zenit St.Petersburg	1990		56	5
Dmitri Karsakov	(Russia)	MF	29 December 1971 (aged 21)	KAMAZ	1992		60	9
Dmitri Khokhlov	(Russia)	MF	22 December 1975 (aged 17)	Trainee	1992		2	0
Mikhail Kolesnikov	(Russia)	MF	8 September 1966 (aged 27)	Trainee	1992		19	1
Denis Mashkarin	(Russia)	MF	17 May 1973 (aged 20)	Zenit St.Petersburg	1992		66	6
Vladislav Radimov	(Russia)	MF	26 November 1975 (aged 17)	Smena-Saturn Saint Petersburg	1992		4	1
Vladimir Semyonov	(Russia)	MF	25 June 1972 (aged 21)	Zarya Leninsk-Kuznetsky	1993		3	0
Dmitri Shoukov	(Russia)	MF	26 September 1975 (aged 18)	Trainee	1993		9	1
Valeri Broshin	(Russia)	MF	19 October 1962 (aged 31)	CD Badajoz	1993		6	2
Yuriy Dudnyk	(Ukraine)	MF	26 September 1968 (aged 25)	Metalurh Zaporizhya	1993		21	2
Forwards
Ilshat Faizulin	(Russia)	FW	5 March 1973 (aged 20)	Trainee	1989		72	17
Leonid Markevich	(Russia)	FW	15 August 1973 (aged 20)	Trainee	1990		4	0
Valeri Masalitin	(Russia)	FW	27 September 1966 (aged 27)	Sigma Olomouc	1993		22	4
Vyacheslav Melnikov	(Russia)	FW	12 March 1975 (aged 18)	Chernomorets Novorossiysk	1992		0	0
Roman Oreshchuk	(Russia)	FW	2 September 1975 (aged 18)	Chernomorets Novorossiysk	1993		4	1
Oleg Sergeyev	(Russia)	FW	29 March 1968 (aged 25)	Rotor Volgograd	1989		63	18
Left During the Season
Sergei Kolotovkin	(Russia)	DF	28 September 1965 (aged 28)	Zenit-D St. Petersburg	1987		47	0
Oleg Malyukov	(Russia)	DF	30 October 1965 (aged 28)	CSKA Pamir Dushanbe	1986		43	0
Sergei Krutov	(Russia)	MF	18 April 1969 (aged 24)	Vitesse Arnhem	1992		17	3

== Transfers ==
In: Note: Flags indicate national team as defined under FIFA eligibility rules; some limited exceptions apply. Players may hold more than one non-FIFA nationality.

No.	Pos.	Nation	Player
—	GK	RUS	Andrei Novosadov (from (Russia) KAMAZ)
—	GK	RUS	Yevgeni Plotnikov (from (Russia) Kuban Krasnodar)
—	DF	ARM	Yervand Krbachyan (from (Armenia) Ararat Yerevan)
—	DF	RUS	Mikhail Kupriyanov (from (Russia) SKA Rostov-on-Don)
—	DF	RUS	Sergei Mamchur (from (Russia) Presnya Moscow)
—	MF	BLR	Yuri Antonovich (from (Belarus) Dinamo Minsk)
—	MF	UKR	Yuriy Dudnyk (from (Ukraine) Metalurh Zaporizhya)
—	MF	RUS	Vladimir Semyonov (from (Russia) Zarya Leninsk-Kuznetsky)
—	MF	RUS	Valeri Broshin (from (Spain) Badajoz)
—	FW	RUS	Valeri Masalitin (from (Czech Republic) Sigma Olomouc)
—	FW	RUS	Roman Oreshchuk (from (Russia) Chernomorets Novorossiysk)

Out: Note: Flags indicate national team as defined under FIFA eligibility rules; some limited exceptions apply. Players may hold more than one non-FIFA nationality.

No.	Pos.	Nation	Player
—	GK	RUS	Dmitri Kharine (to (England) Chelsea)
—	GK	RUS	Platon Zakharchuk (to (Russia) KAMAZ Naberezhnye Chelny)
—	DF	RUS	Yuri Bavykin (to (Russia) Lada-Togliatti)
—	DF	RUS	Sergei Fokin (to (Germany) Eintracht Braunschweig)
—	DF	RUS	Sergei Kolotovkin (to (Israel) Beitar Jerusalem)
—	DF	RUS	Oleg Malyukov (to (Israel) Hapoel Rishon LeZion)
—	DF	RUS	Mikhail Sinyov (to (Russia) KAMAZ Naberezhnye Chelny)
—	MF	RUS	Aleksei Bobrov (to (Russia) Lada-Togliatti)
—	MF	RUS	Andrei Ilyaskin (to (Russia) Shinnik Yaroslavl)
—	MF	RUS	Sergei Krutov (to (Russia) Dynamo Moscow)
—	MF	RUS	Dmitri Kuznetsov (to (Spain) Espanyol)
—	MF	RUS	Aleksei Poddubskiy (to (Russia) Okean Nakhodka)
—	FW	RUS	Lev Matveyev (to (Russia) Zvezda Perm)

== Competitions ==
=== Top League ===
==== Results by round ====
Round	1	2	3	4	5	6	7	8	9	10	11	12	13	14	15	16	17	18	19	20	21	22	23	24	25	26	27	28	29	30	31	32	33	34
Ground	H	A	A	H	H	A	A	A	H	H	A	A	H	H	A	A	H	H	A	A	H	A	H	H	A	A	H	H	A	A	H	H	H	A
Result	W	L	L	W	D	L	D	L	W	D	L	L	W	W	L	L	W	W	L	L	W	L	L	W	L	L	W	D	W	W	L	D	D	L

Updated to match(es) played on 10 November 1993. Source: See Results
A = Away; H = Home; W = Win; D = Draw; L = Loss

==== Results ====
8 March 1993 1	CSKA Moscow	4 – 0	Krylia Sovetov	Moscow
MSK (UTC+3)	Antonovich 19'; Krutov 29'; Bystrov (yellow card) 43'; Ivanov 53', 62'; Malyukov (yellow card) 54'	Report		Stadium: Light-Athletic Football Complex CSKA; Referee: Miloserdov

21 March 1993 2	Rotor Volgograd	3 – 0	CSKA Moscow	Volgograd
MSK (UTC+3)	Veretennikov 10', 49'; Tsarenko 73'	Report	Kolotovkin (yellow card) 61'; Dudnyk (yellow card) 78'	Stadium: Central Stadium; Referee: Taras Bezubyak

24 March 1993 3	Torpedo Moscow	2 – 1	CSKA Moscow	Moscow
MSK (UTC+3)	Chugainov 64'; Ulyanov 80'	Report	Faizulin 16'; Mamchur (yellow card) 62'	Stadium: Eduard Streltsov Stadium; Referee: V.Ovchinnikov

27 March 1993 4	CSKA Moscow	3 – 1	Luch Vladivostok	Moscow
MSK (UTC+4)	Faizulin 11'; Krutov 29'; Karsakov 44'	Report	Goncharenko 47'	Stadium: Light-Athletic Football Complex CSKA; Referee: A.Savkin

31 March 1993 5	CSKA Moscow	0 – 0	Okean Nakhodka	Moscow
MSK (UTC+4)	Karsakov (yellow card) 13'; Malyukov (yellow card) 34'; Ivanov (yellow card) 44'; Mamchur (yellow card) 66'	Report	Poddubskiy (yellow card) 40'; Grytsan (yellow card) 53'; Averyanov (yellow card) 69'; Mamchur (yellow card) 66'	Stadium: Light-Athletic Football Complex CSKA; Referee: Nikolai Levnikov

17 April 1993 6	Lokomotiv Moscow	2 – 0	CSKA Moscow	Moscow
MSK (UTC+4)	Mukhamadiev 7'; Podpaly 56' (pen.); Drozdov (yellow card) 63'	Report		Stadium: Lokomotiv Stadium; Referee: Y.Savchenko

2 May 1993 7	Dynamo Stavropol	1 – 1	CSKA Moscow	Stavropol
MSK (UTC+4)	Korneyev (yellow card) 20' (goal) 74' (pen.)	Report	Sergeyev 65' (yellow card) 68'	Stadium: Dynamo Stadium; Referee: V.Denisov

6 May 1993 8	Rostselmash	1 – 0	CSKA Moscow	Rostov-on-Don
18:00 MSK (UTC+4)	Styopushkin 34' (pen.); Posylayev (yellow card) 68'	Report	Malyukov (yellow card) 13'; Bushmanov (yellow card) 27'; Karsakov (yellow card) 57'; Kolotovkin (yellow card) 62'	Stadium: Olimp-2; Referee: N.Yegorov

13 May 1993 9	CSKA Moscow	4 – 0	Spartak Vladikavkaz	Moscow
MSK (UTC+4)	Antonovich 12' (pen.); Sergeyev 39'; Grishin 73'; Radimov 84'	Report	Isayev (yellow card) 8'	Stadium: Luzhniki Stadium; Referee: I.Siner

17 May 1993 10	CSKA Moscow	1 – 1	Zhemchuzhina-Sochi	Moscow
MSK (UTC+4)	Faizulin 32'; Malyukov (yellow card) 43'	Report	Pocheptsov (yellow card) 11'; Gogrichiani 58'	Stadium: Luzhniki Stadium; Referee: V.Yarygin

5 June 1993 11	Uralmash	1 – 0	CSKA Moscow	Yekaterinburg
18:30 MSK (UTC+4)	Perednya 3'; Safin (yellow card) 76'	Report	Kolotovkin (yellow card) 62'	Stadium: Uralmash Stadium; Referee: Rumyantsev

9 June 1993 12	KAMAZ Naberezhnye Chelny	1 – 0	CSKA Moscow	Naberezhnye Chelny
19:00 MSK (UTC+4)	Sinyov (yellow card) 54'; Panchenko 64'	Report	Bushmanov (yellow card) 11'; Guschin (yellow card) 87'	Stadium: KAMAZ Stadium; Referee: Yuri Chebotaryov

17 June 1993 13	CSKA Moscow	1 – 0	Asmaral Moscow	Moscow
MSK (UTC+4)	Minko 74' (pen.); Sergeyev (yellow card) 77'	Report	Safronov (yellow card) 57'	Stadium: Dynamo Stadium; Referee: Sergei Anokhin

20 June 1993 14	CSKA Moscow	3 – 0	Lokomotiv Nizhny Novgorod	Moscow
MSK (UTC+4)	Faizulin 17', 55'; Krbachyan (yellow card) 81'; Oreshchuk 88'	Report	Rydny (yellow card) 75'	Stadium: Dynamo Stadium; Referee: Taras Bezubyak

27 June 1993 15	Spartak Moscow	6 – 0	CSKA Moscow	Moscow
MSK (UTC+4)	Lediakhov 15', 55', 90'; V.Beschastnykh 50'; Pyatnitsky 64'; Karpin 86'	Report	Krbachyan (yellow card) 43'	Stadium: Luzhniki Stadium; Referee: Yuriy Hlopotnov

1 July 1993 16	Dynamo Moscow	2 – 1	CSKA Moscow	Moscow
MSK (UTC+4)	Derkach 2' (yellow card) 85'; Dobrovolski 60' (pen.); Timofeev (yellow card) 61'	Report	Dudnyk 32' (pen.); Guschin (yellow card) 36'	Stadium: Dynamo Stadium; Referee: Valeri Butenko

10 July 1993 17	CSKA Moscow	2 – 0	Rotor Volgograd	Moscow
MSK (UTC+4)	Karsakov 12'; Faizulin 65'	Report	Kuznetsov (yellow card) 58'	Stadium: Luzhniki Stadium; Referee: A.Savkin

13 July 1993 18	CSKA Moscow	3 – 0	Tekstilshchik Kamyshin	Moscow
MSK (UTC+4)	Grishin 14'; Sergeyev 31'; Faizulin 36'	Report		Stadium: Luzhniki Stadium; Referee: A.Markelov

18 July 1993 19	Okean Nakhodka	1 – 0	CSKA Moscow	Nakhodka
11:00 MSK (UTC+4)	Rakhmanov 14'	Report		Stadium: Vodnik Stadium; Referee: G.Kulichenko

22 July 1993 20	Luch Vladivostok	2 – 1	CSKA Moscow	Vladivostok
12:00 MSK (UTC+4)	Ruslyakov 83'; Prilous 85'	Report	Sergeyev 25'	Stadium: Dynamo Stadium; Referee: N.Miloserdov

8 August 1993 21	CSKA Moscow	3 – 1	Lokomotiv Moscow	Moscow
MSK (UTC+4)	Masalitin 27'; Grishin 50'; Sergeyev 72'	Report	Veselov 56'	Stadium: Luzhniki Stadium; Referee: Sergei Khusainov

12 August 1993 22	Tekstilshchik Kamyshin	3 – 0	CSKA Moscow	Kamyshin
19:00 MSK (UTC+4)	Natalushko 59' (pen.), 74' (pen.), 89'; Elyshev (yellow card) 65'	Report	Masalitin (yellow card) 42'	Stadium: Tekstilshchik Stadium; Referee: B.Gavrin

27 August 1993 23	CSKA Moscow	2 – 3	Rostselmash	Moscow
MSK (UTC+4)	Shoukov 80'; Minko 86' (pen.)	Report	Sanko 24'; Andreyev 58', 70'	Stadium: Grigory Fedotov Stadium; Referee: Nikolai Levnikov

1 September 1993 24	CSKA Moscow	2 – 0	Dynamo Stavropol	Moscow
MSK (UTC+4)	Antonovich 12'; Ivanov (yellow card) 34'; Sergeyev 90'	Report	Shestakov (yellow card) 71'	Stadium: Grigory Fedotov Stadium; Referee: I.Siner

11 September 1993 25	Spartak Vladikavkaz	2 – 0	CSKA Moscow	Vladikavkaz
17:00 MSK (UTC+4)	Dzhioyev 21', 73' (yellow card) 27'	Report	Dudnyk (yellow card) 27'	Stadium: Republican Spartak Stadium; Referee: Yuri Chebotaryov

19 September 1993 26	Zhemchuzhina-Sochi	1 – 0	CSKA Moscow	Sochi
18:00 MSK (UTC+4)	Chekunov (yellow card) 44'; Bogatyryov 54'	Report	Mashkarin (yellow card) 45'	Stadium: Sochi Central Stadium; Referee: G.Kulichenko

25 September 1993 27	CSKA Moscow	2 – 1	Uralmash	Moscow
MSK (UTC+4)	Minko 8' (pen.), 28'; Antonovich (yellow card) 48'	Report	Safin (yellow card) 31'; Sosnitskiy 58'; Bluzhin (yellow card) 71'	Stadium: Luzhniki Stadium; Referee: V.Yarygin

2 October 1993 28	CSKA Moscow	1 – 1	KAMAZ Naberezhnye Chelny	Moscow
18:00 MSK (UTC+4)	Sergeyev 74'	Report	Panchenko 12'	Stadium: Luzhniki Stadium; Referee: Taras Bezubyak

11 October 1993 29	Asmaral Moscow	1 – 2	CSKA Moscow	Moscow
MSK (UTC+4)	Panfyorov 50'	Report	Broshin 19'; Minko 58' (pen.); Guschin (yellow card) 82'	Stadium: Grigory Fedotov Stadium; Referee: A.Kirillov

16 October 1993 30	Lokomotiv Nizhny Novgorod	1 – 4	CSKA Moscow	Nizhny Novgorod
MSK (UTC+4)	Kurayev 63' (pen.)	Report	Minko 17'; Sergeyev 33'; Karsakov 46'; Faizulin 47'	Stadium: Lokomotiv Stadium; Referee: A.Markelov

24 October 1993 31	CSKA Moscow	0 – 3	Spartak Moscow	Moscow
MSK (UTC+4)	Ivanov (yellow card) 89'	Report	Cherenkov 38'; Nikiforov (yellow card) 65'; Pisarev 66'; Ananko (yellow card) 71'; Onopko 84'	Stadium: Luzhniki Stadium; Referee: Sergei Anokhin

30 October 1993 32	CSKA Moscow	1 – 1	Dynamo Moscow	Moscow
MSK (UTC+3)	Mashkarin 62'	Report	Dobrovolski 55'	Stadium: Luzhniki Stadium; Referee: Valentin Ivanov

7 November 1993 33	CSKA Moscow	1 – 1	Torpedo Moscow	Moscow
18:00 MSK (UTC+3)	Broshin 16'; Mamchur (yellow card) 87'	Report	Grishin 36'; Kalaychev (yellow card) 79'	Stadium: Light-Athletic Football Complex CSKA; Referee: Sergei Khusainov

10 November 1993 34	Krylia Sovetov	2 – 0	CSKA Moscow	Samara
MSK (UTC+3)	Delov 25'; Avalyan 31'	Report		Stadium: Metallurg Stadium; Referee: Rumyantsev

==== League table ====
Pos	Team	Pld	W	D	L	GF	GA	GD	Pts	Qualification or relegation
8	Uralmash Yekaterinburg	34	16	4	14	51	52	−1	36	
9	KAMAZ Naberezhnye Chelny	34	12	6	16	45	53	−8	30	
10	CSKA Moscow	34	12	6	16	43	45	−2	30	Qualification to Cup Winners' Cup first round
11	Lokomotiv N.N.	34	12	6	16	34	49	−15	30	
12	Dynamo Stavropol	34	11	8	15	39	49	−10	30	

Source: rsssf.com
Rules for classification: 1) points; 2) goal difference; 3) number of goals scored.

=== Russian Cup ===
==== 1992-93 ====
19 February 1993 Quarterfinal	CSKA Moscow	3 – 0	Svetotekhnika Saransk	Moscow
MSK (UTC+3)	Plotnikov (yellow card) 38'; Karsakov 40'; Bushmanov 59'; Grishin 61' (pen.)	Report	Markin (yellow card) 72'	Stadium: Light-Athletic Football Complex CSKA; Attendance: 3,000; Referee: Gennadi Kulichenkov

27 May 1993 Semifinal	CSKA Moscow	1 – 0	Dynamo Moscow	Moscow
MSK (UTC+4)	Grishin 2'; Mashkarin (yellow card) 13'	Report	Kovtun (yellow card) 24'; Timofeev (yellow card) 73'	Stadium: Luzhniki Stadium; Attendance: 9,500; Referee: Sergei Anokhin

13 June 1993 Final	Torpedo Moscow	1 – 1 (a.e.t.) (5 – 3 p)	CSKA Moscow	Moscow
MSK (UTC+4)	Savichev 7'	Report	Faizulin 18'	Stadium: Torpedo Stadium; Attendance: 20,000; Referee: Sergei Khusainov
	Penalties
	Afanasyev (penalty scored); Novgorodov (penalty scored); Pazyomov (penalty scored); Arefyev (penalty scored); Ulyanov (penalty scored)		(penalty missed) Antonovich; (penalty scored) Dudnyk; (penalty scored) Minko; (penalty scored) Mamchur

==== 1993-94 ====
5 July 1993 Round of 32	Baltika Kaliningrad	0 – 1	CSKA Moscow	Kaliningrad
19:00 MSK (UTC+4)		Report	Dudnyk 36'	Stadium: Baltika Stadium; Attendance: 17,000; Referee: Sergey Lapochkin

1 August 1993 Round of 16	Presnya Moscow	1 – 2	CSKA Moscow	Moscow
MSK (UTC+4)	Panfyorov 72'	Report	Sergeyev (yellow card) 23'; Mashkarin 65'; Grishin 84' (yellow card) 88'	Stadium: Krasnaya Presnya Stadium; Attendance: 1,500; Referee: Vyacheslav Sorokin

The Quarterfinal took place during the 1994 season.

=== UEFA Champions League ===
==== Group stage ====
Pos	Team	Pld	W	D	L	GF	GA	GD	Pts	Qualification	MAR	RAN	BRU	CSKA
1	(France) Marseille	6	3	3	0	14	4	+10	9	Advance to final	—	1–1	3–0	6–0
2	(Scotland) Rangers	6	2	4	0	7	5	+2	8		2–2	—	2–1	0–0
3	(Belgium) Club Brugge	6	2	1	3	5	8	−3	5		0–1	1–1	—	1–0
4	(Russia) CSKA Moscow	6	0	2	4	2	11	−9	2		1–1	0–1	1–2	—

Source: UEFA

3 March 1993 3	CSKA Moscow (Russia)	1 – 1	(France) Marseille	Berlin, Germany
22:30 MSK (UTC+3)	Mamchur (yellow card) 14'; Ivanov (yellow card) 36'; Faizulin 55'	Report	Pelé 27'	Stadium: Olympiastadion; Attendance: 20,000; Referee: Fabio Baldas (Italy)

17 March 1993 4	Marseille (France)	6 – 0	(Russia) CSKA Moscow	Marseille, France
22:30 MSK (UTC+3)	Sauzée 4' (pen.), 34', 48'; Pelé 42'; Ferreri 70'; Desailly 78'	Report		Stadium: Stade Vélodrome; Attendance: 40,000; Referee: Serge Muhmenthaler (Switzerland)

7 April 1993 5	CSKA Moscow (Russia)	1 – 2	(Belgium) Club Brugge	Berlin, Germany
22:30 MSK (UTC+4)	Sergeyev 18'	Report	Schaessens 43'; Van Der Heyden (yellow card) 69'; Verheyen 83'	Stadium: Olympiastadion; Attendance: 2,500; Referee: Angelo Amendolia (Italy)

21 April 1993 6	Rangers (Scotland)	0 – 0	(Russia) CSKA Moscow	Glasgow, Scotland
22:30 MSK (UTC+4)			Minko (yellow card) 50'; Antonovich (yellow card) 76'	Stadium: Ibrox Stadium; Attendance: 43,142; Referee: Peter Mikkelsen (Denmark)

== Squad statistics ==
As of match played 10 November 1993

=== Appearances and goals ===
No.	Pos	Nat	Player	Total		Top League		1992–93 Russian Cup		1993–94 Russian Cup		Champions League	
No.	Pos	Nat	Player	Apps	Goals	Apps	Goals	Apps	Goals	Apps	Goals	Apps	Goals
	GK	(Russia) RUS	Aleksandr Guteyev	13	0	10	0	0	0	2	0	1	0
	GK	(Russia) RUS	Yevgeni Plotnikov	30	0	24	0	3	0	0	0	3	0
	DF	(Armenia) ARM	Yervand Krbachyan	13	0	8+3	0	0	0	2	0	0	0
	DF	(Russia) RUS	Yevgeni Bushmanov	37	1	30	0	1+1	1	1	0	4	0
	DF	(Russia) RUS	Dmitri Bystrov	6	0	3	0	1	0	0	0	2	0
	DF	(Russia) RUS	Aleksei Guschin	33	1	26+1	0	3	1	1	0	2	0
	DF	(Russia) RUS	Mikhail Kupriyanov	10	0	5+4	0	0	0	1	0	0	0
	DF	(Russia) RUS	Sergei Mamchur	33	0	18+8	0	3	0	0	0	3+1	0
	DF	(Russia) RUS	Valeri Minko	32	6	22+4	6	1+1	0	0	0	4	0
	MF	(Belarus) BLR	Yuri Antonovich	40	3	29+3	3	3	0	1	0	3+1	0
	MF	(Russia) RUS	Aleksandr Grishin	28	6	18+6	3	1	2	1+1	1	0+1	0
	MF	(Russia) RUS	Vasili Ivanov	28	2	15+9	2	1+1	0	0	0	2	0
	MF	(Russia) RUS	Dmitri Karsakov	39	4	29+2	3	2	1	2	0	2+2	0
	MF	(Russia) RUS	Dmitri Khokhlov	2	0	0+1	0	0	0	1	0	0	0
	MF	(Russia) RUS	Mikhail Kolesnikov	1	0	0	0	0+1	0	0	0	0	0
	MF	(Russia) RUS	Denis Mashkarin	38	2	30+1	1	2	0	2	1	3	0
	MF	(Russia) RUS	Vladislav Radimov	3	1	0+3	1	0	0	0	0	0	0
	MF	(Russia) RUS	Vladimir Semyonov	3	0	0+2	0	0+1	0	0	0	0	0
	MF	(Russia) RUS	Valeri Broshin	6	2	5+1	2	0	0	0	0	0	0
	MF	(Ukraine) UKR	Yuriy Dudnyk	21	2	6+9	1	1+2	0	1	1	0+2	0
	MF	(Russia) RUS	Dmitri Shoukov	9	1	0+8	1	0	0	0+1	0	0	0
	FW	(Russia) RUS	Ilshat Faizulin	41	10	29+3	8	3	1	2	0	4	1
	FW	(Russia) RUS	Leonid Markevich	4	0	0+3	0	0	0	0+1	0	0	0
	FW	(Russia) RUS	Valeri Masalitin	15	1	3+10	1	0+1	0	1	0	0	0
	FW	(Russia) RUS	Roman Oreshchuk	4	1	0+4	1	0	0	0	0	0	0
	FW	(Russia) RUS	Oleg Sergeyev	39	9	31	8	2	0	2	0	4	1
Players who left CSKA Moscow during the season:
	DF	(Russia) RUS	Sergei Kolotovkin	23	0	14+2	0	3	0	1	0	3	0
	DF	(Russia) RUS	Oleg Malyukov	23	0	15	0	1+1	0	2	0	4	0
	FW	(Russia) RUS	Sergei Krutov	5	2	4	2	1	0	0	0	0	0

=== Goal Scorers ===
Place	Position	Nation	Name	Top League	1992–93 Russian Cup	1993–94 Russian Cup	Champions League	Total
1	FW	(Russia)	Ilshat Faizulin	8	1	0	1	10
2	FW	(Russia)	Oleg Sergeyev	8	0	0	1	9
3	DF	(Russia)	Valeri Minko	6	0	0	0	6
3	MF	(Russia)	Aleksandr Grishin	3	2	1	0	6
5	MF	(Russia)	Dmitri Karsakov	3	1	0	0	4
6	MF	(Belarus)	Yuri Antonovich	3	0	0	0	3
7	FW	(Russia)	Sergei Krutov	2	0	0	0	2
7	MF	(Russia)	Vasili Ivanov	2	0	0	0	2
7	MF	(Russia)	Valeri Broshin	2	0	0	0	2
7	MF	(Ukraine)	Yuriy Dudnyk	1	0	1	0	2
7	DF	(Russia)	Denis Mashkarin	1	0	1	0	2
12	MF	(Russia)	Vladislav Radimov	1	0	0	0	1
12	FW	(Russia)	Roman Oreshchuk	1	0	0	0	1
12	FW	(Russia)	Valeri Masalitin	1	0	0	0	1
12	MF	(Russia)	Dmitri Shoukov	1	0	0	0	1
12	DF	(Russia)	Yevgeni Bushmanov	0	1	0	0	1
			TOTALS	43	5	2	2	52

=== Disciplinary record ===
Nation	Position	Name	Top League		1992–93 Russian Cup		1993–94 Russian Cup		Champions League		Total	
Nation	Position	Name	Booked	Sent off (straight red)	Booked	Sent off (straight red)	Booked	Sent off (straight red)	Booked	Sent off (straight red)	Booked	Sent off (straight red)
(Russia)	GK	Yevgeni Plotnikov	0	0	1	0	0	0	0	0	1	0
(Russia)	DF	Yevgeni Bushmanov	2	0	0	0	0	0	0	0	2	0
(Russia)	DF	Dmitri Bystrov	1	0	0	0	0	0	0	0	1	0
(Russia)	DF	Aleksei Guschin	3	0	0	0	0	0	0	0	3	0
(Russia)	DF	Vasili Ivanov	3	0	0	0	0	0	1	0	4	0
(Russia)	DF	Sergei Kolotovkin	3	0	0	0	0	0	0	0	3	0
(Armenia)	DF	Yervand Krbachyan	2	0	0	0	0	0	0	0	2	0
(Russia)	DF	Oleg Malyukov	4	0	0	0	0	0	0	0	4	0
(Russia)	DF	Sergei Mamchur	3	0	0	0	0	0	1	0	4	0
(Russia)	DF	Valeri Minko	0	0	0	0	0	0	1	0	1	0
(Belarus)	MF	Yuri Antonovich	1	0	0	0	0	0	1	0	2	0
(Russia)	MF	Aleksandr Grishin	0	0	0	0	1	0	0	0	1	0
(Russia)	MF	Dmitri Karsakov	2	0	0	0	0	0	0	0	2	0
(Russia)	MF	Denis Mashkarin	1	0	1	0	0	0	0	0	2	0
(Ukraine)	MF	Yuriy Dudnyk	2	0	0	0	0	0	0	0	2	0
(Russia)	FW	Oleg Sergeyev	2	0	0	0	1	0	0	0	3	0
(Russia)	FW	Valeri Masalitin	1	0	0	0	0	0	0	0	1	0
		TOTALS	30	0	2	0	2	0	4	0	38	0
