= 1992 PFC CSKA Moscow season =

CSKA
1992 season
- Manager: Gennadi Kostylev
- Stadium: Eduard Streltsov Stadium; Luzhniki Stadium; Grigory Fedotov Stadium
- Top League: 5th
- Russian Cup: Continued in 1993
- UEFA Champions League: Continued in 1993
- Top goalscorer: League: Aleksandr Grishin (10); All: Aleksandr Grishin 11

The 1992 CSKA season was the club's first season in the newly formed Russian Top League, the highest tier of association football in Russia.

== Squad ==
As of match played 9 December 1992

Name	Nationality	Position	Date of birth (age)	Signed from	Signed in	Contract ends	Apps.	Goals
Goalkeepers
Aleksandr Guteyev	(Russia)	GK	18 June 1967 (aged 25)	Torpedo Moscow	1988		6	0
Dmitri Kharine	(Russia)	GK	16 August 1968 (aged 24)	Dynamo Moscow	1991		29	0
Platon Zakharchuk	(Russia)	GK	10 September 1972 (aged 20)	KAMAZ	1992		1	0
Defenders
Yuri Bavykin	(Russia)	DF	31 March 1973 (aged 19)	Salyut Belgorod	1989		21	0
Yevgeni Bushmanov	(Russia)	DF	2 November 1971 (aged 21)	Spartak Moscow	1992		14	1
Dmitri Bystrov	(Russia)	DF	30 July 1967 (aged 25)	Lokomotiv Moscow	1986		26	1
Sergei Fokin	(Russia)	DF	26 July 1961 (aged 31)	Alga Frunze	1978		16	1
Aleksei Guschin	(Russia)	DF	21 October 1971 (aged 21)	Trainee	1989		30	0
Sergei Kolotovkin	(Russia)	DF	28 September 1965 (aged 27)	Zenit-D St. Petersburg	1987		24	0
Oleg Malyukov	(Russia)	DF	30 October 1965 (aged 27)	CSKA Pamir Dushanbe	1986		20	0
Valeri Minko	(Russia)	DF	8 August 1971 (aged 21)	Dynamo Barnaul	1989		24	0
Mikhail Sinyov	(Russia)	DF	21 June 1972 (aged 20)	Trainee	1988		1	0
Midfielders
Aleksei Bobrov	(Russia)	MF	27 March 1972 (aged 20)	Trainee	1989		6	0
Aleksandr Grishin	(Russia)	MF	18 November 1971 (aged 21)	Lokomotiv Moscow	1989		27	15
Andrei Ilyaskin	(Russia)	MF	25 July 1967 (aged 25)	Polonia Warsaw	1992		7	1
Vasili Ivanov	(Russia)	MF	21 March 1970 (aged 22)	Zenit St.Petersburg	1990		28	3
Dmitri Karsakov	(Russia)	MF	29 December 1971 (aged 20)	KAMAZ	1992		21	5
Sergei Krutov	(Russia)	MF	18 April 1969 (aged 23)	Vitesse Arnhem	1992		12	1
Mikhail Kolesnikov	(Russia)	MF	8 September 1966 (aged 26)	Trainee	1992		18	1
Dmitri Kuznetsov	(Russia)	MF	28 August 1965 (aged 27)	Espanyol	1992		7	5
Denis Mashkarin	(Russia)	MF	17 May 1973 (aged 19)	Zenit St.Petersburg	1992		28	4
Aleksei Poddubskiy	(Russia)	MF	13 June 1972 (aged 20)	SKA-Khabarovsk	1992		12	1
Vladislav Radimov	(Russia)	MF	26 November 1975 (aged 17)	Smena-Saturn Saint Petersburg	1992		1	0
Forwards
Ilshat Faizulin	(Russia)	FW	5 March 1973 (aged 19)	Trainee	1989		31	7
Lev Matveyev	(Russia)	FW	12 February 1971 (aged 21)	Zvezda Perm	1991		15	1
Vyacheslav Melnikov	(Russia)	FW	12 March 1975 (aged 17)	Chernomorets Novorossiysk	1992		0	0
Oleg Sergeyev	(Russia)	FW	29 March 1968 (aged 24)	Rotor Volgograd	1989		24	9
Left During the Season
Aleksandr Solop	(Russia)	DF	23 June 1971 (aged 21)	Kuban Krasnodar	1992		2	0
Igor Makarov	(Russia)	FW	10 June 1970 (aged 22)	Zarya Kaluga	1992		5	0
Valeri Masalitin	(Russia)	FW	27 September 1966 (aged 26)	Vitesse Arnhem	1990		7	3

== Transfers ==
In: Note: Flags indicate national team as defined under FIFA eligibility rules; some limited exceptions apply. Players may hold more than one non-FIFA nationality.

No.	Pos.	Nation	Player
—	GK	RUS	Platon Zakharchuk (from (Russia) KAMAZ)
—	DF	RUS	Yevgeni Bushmanov (from (Russia) Spartak Moscow)
—	DF	RUS	Aleksandr Solop (from (Russia) Kuban Krasnodar)
—	MF	RUS	Andrei Ilyaskin (from (Poland) Polonia Warsaw)
—	MF	RUS	Dmitri Karsakov (from (Russia) KAMAZ)
—	MF	RUS	Sergei Krutov (from (Netherlands) Vitesse Arnhem)
—	MF	RUS	Dmitri Kuznetsov (from (Spain) Espanyol)
—	MF	RUS	Denis Mashkarin (from (Russia) Zenit St.Petersburg)
—	MF	RUS	Aleksei Poddubskiy (from (Russia) SKA-Khabarovsk)
—	MF	RUS	Vladislav Radimov (from (Russia) Smena-Saturn Saint Petersburg)
—	FW	RUS	Igor Makarov (from (Russia) Zarya Kaluga)

Out: Note: Flags indicate national team as defined under FIFA eligibility rules; some limited exceptions apply. Players may hold more than one non-FIFA nationality.

No.	Pos.	Nation	Player
—	DF	RUS	Aleksandr Solop (to (Russia) Fakel Voronezh)
—	FW	RUS	Igor Makarov (to (Russia) Fakel Voronezh)
—	FW	RUS	Valeri Masalitin (to (Belgium) Beerschot)

== Competitions ==
=== Top League ===
==== Group A ====
===== Results by round =====
Round	1	2	3	4	5	6	7	8	9	10	11	12	13	14	15	16	17	18
Ground	A	A	H	H	A	A	A	H	H	A	A	H	H	H	A	A	H	H
Result	L	W	W	W	D	W	L	W	D	D	D	W	W	W	L	D	L	W

Updated to match(es) played on 12 August 1992. Source: See Results
A = Away; H = Home; W = Win; D = Draw; L = Loss

===== Results =====
29 March 1992 1	Spartak Vladikavkaz	2 – 0	CSKA Moscow	Vladikavkaz
MSK (DST) (UTC+4)	Qosimov 9'; Shkvyrin 89'	Report		Stadium: Republican Stadium; Referee: Nikolai Levnikov

1 April 1992 2	Dynamo Stavropol	1 – 2	CSKA Moscow	Stavropol
MSK (DST) (UTC+4)	Onufriyev (yellow card) 6'; Tsarayev 62'	Report	Masalitin 16', 56'; Ivanov (yellow card) 59'; Malyukov (yellow card) 71'	Stadium: Dynamo Stadium; Referee: Lom-Ali Ibragimov

9 April 1992 3	CSKA Moscow	1 – 0	Tekstilshchik Kamyshin	Moscow
MSK (DST) (UTC+4)	Poddubskiy (yellow card) 48'; Guschin (yellow card) 51'; Grishin 52'	Report	Morozov (yellow card) 32'	Stadium: Eduard Streltsov Stadium; Referee: Lom-Ali Ibragimov

12 April 1992 4	CSKA Moscow	2 – 0	Fakel Voronez	Moscow
MSK (DST) (UTC+4)	Bystrov (yellow card) 20' (goal) 69'; Masalitin 65' (pen.)	Report	Shchyogolev (yellow card) 13' (red card) 70'	Stadium: Eduard Streltsov Stadium; Referee: Yuri Chebotaryov

22 April 1992 5	Uralmash Yekaterinburg	1 – 1	CSKA Moscow	Yekaterinburg
MSK (DST) (UTC+4)	Popov 51' (yellow card) 68'	Report	Faizulin 31'; Sergeyev (yellow card) 87'	Stadium: Uralmash Stadium; Referee: Miloserdov

25 April 1992 6	Dinamo-Gazovik	0 – 1	CSKA Moscow	Tyumen
MSK (DST) (UTC+4)	Kovalev (yellow card) 24'	Report	Solop (yellow card) 21'; Matveyev 38'; Sergeyev (yellow card) 89'	Stadium: Geolog Stadium; Referee: Taras Bezubyak

3 May 1992 7	Dynamo Moscow	2 – 1	CSKA Moscow	Moscow
MSK (DST) (UTC+4)	Kobelev 38', 47' (pen.)	Report	Kolotovkin (yellow card) 41'; Minko 76'	Stadium: Dynamo Stadium; Referee: Andrei Budogossky

14 May 1992 8	CSKA Moscow	2 – 0	Okean Nakhodka	Moscow
MSK (DST) (UTC+4)	Faizulin 60'; Sergeyev 65'	Report	Smirnov (yellow card) 46'	Stadium: Luzhniki Stadium; Referee: Nikolai Levnikov

18 May 1992 9	CSKA Moscow	1 – 1	Lokomotiv Moscow	Moscow
MSK (DST) (UTC+4)	Krutov 79' (pen.)	Report	Mukhamadiev 83'	Stadium: Luzhniki Stadium; Referee: Yuri Savchenko

29 June 1992 10	Tekstilshchik Kamyshin	1 – 1	CSKA Moscow	Kamyshin
MSK (DST) (UTC+4)	Natalushko 51'	Report	Ivanov (yellow card) 25'; Mashkarin 56' (yellow card) 76'	Stadium: Tekstilshchik Stadium; Referee: A.Kolymazhny

2 July 1992 11	Fakel Voronezh	1 – 1	CSKA Moscow	Voronezh
MSK (DST) (UTC+4)	Syomin 49'	Report	Kharine (yellow card) 39'; Grishin (yellow card) 57'; Bystrov (yellow card) 65'; Mashkarin 85'	Stadium: Tsentralnyi Profsoyuz Stadion; Referee: G.Kulichenko

8 July 1992 12	CSKA Moscow	2 – 1	Uralmash Yekaterinburg	Moscow
MSK (DST) (UTC+4)	Kuznetsov 71'; Mashkarin 86'	Report	Shushlyakov 9'; Matveyev (yellow card) 25'; Popov (yellow card) 30'	Stadium: Luzhniki Stadium; Referee: Igor Egorov

12 July 1992 13	CSKA Moscow	3 – 0	Dinamo-Gazovik	Moscow
MSK (DST) (UTC+4)	Masalitin 67'; Kuznetsov 86', 89' (pen.)	Report	Zarva (yellow card) 30'; Umyarov (yellow card) 32'; A.Vlasov (yellow card) 88'	Stadium: Luzhniki Stadium; Referee: Y.Chebotarev

17 July 1992 14	CSKA Moscow	4 – 1	Dynamo Moscow	Moscow
MSK (DST) (UTC+4)	Kuznetsov 33' (pen.); Faizulin 42'; Fokin (yellow card) 63' (goal) 89'; Minko 81'	Report	Gasimov 15'; Tsaryov (yellow card) 19'; Dolgov (yellow card) 24'	Stadium: Luzhniki Stadium; Referee: Alexey Spirin

30 July 1992 15	Okean Nakhodka	5 – 2	CSKA Moscow	Nakhodka
MSK (DST) (UTC+4)	Kozlov 8'; Shpiryuk 13'; Garin 68', 82'; Novoseltsev 88'	Report	Ilyaskin 2'; Grishin 19' (yellow card) 70'	Stadium: Vodnik Stadium; Referee: V.Yarygin

3 August 1992 16	Lokomotiv Moscow	0 – 0	CSKA Moscow	Moscow
MSK (DST) (UTC+4)		Report		Stadium: Lokomotiv Stadium; Referee: Valeri Butenko

9 August 1992 17	CSKA Moscow	2 – 4	Spartak Vladikavkaz	Moscow
MSK (DST) (UTC+4)	Kolotovkin (yellow card) 21'; Kuznetsov 43'; Masalitin (yellow card) 66'; Kharine (yellow card) 74'; Sergeyev 77'	Report	Pagayev (yellow card) 9'; Suleymanov 15' (pen.), 71' (pen.); Alchagirov (yellow card) 25'; Tedeyev 42' (yellow card) 74'; Gazdanov (yellow card) 67'; Isayev (yellow card) 73'; Qosimov 84'	Stadium: Luzhniki Stadium; Referee: I.Siner

12 August 1992 18	CSKA Moscow	3 – 0	Dynamo Stavropol	Moscow
MSK (DST) (UTC+4)	Grishin 9'; Karsakov 32'; Ivanov 55'	Report	Bogachyov (yellow card) 35'	Stadium: Luzhniki Stadium; Referee: G.Kulichenko

===== League table =====
Pos	Team	Pld	W	D	L	GF	GA	GD	Pts	Qualification
2	Lokomotiv Moscow	18	9	6	3	23	14	+9	24	Qualification to Championship Round
3	Spartak Vladikavkaz	18	9	5	4	31	18	+13	23	Qualification to Championship Round
4	CSKA Moscow	18	9	5	4	29	20	+9	23	Qualification to Championship Round
5	Tekstilshchik Kamyshin	18	8	5	5	20	17	+3	21	Qualification to Relegation Round
6	Uralmash Yekaterinburg	18	8	3	7	28	29	−1	19	Qualification to Relegation Round

Source: rsssf.com
Rules for classification: 1) points; 2) goal difference; 3) number of goals scored.

==== Final stage ====
===== Results by round =====
Round	1	2	3	4	5	6	7	8
Ground	H	A	H	A	H	A	H	A
Result	W	D	W	D	L	W	L	W

Source: See Results
A = Away; H = Home; W = Win; D = Draw; L = Loss

===== Matches =====
30 August 1992 19	CSKA Moscow	4 – 1	Asmaral Moscow	Moscow
MSK (DST) (UTC+4)	Grishin 27', 43', 83'; Faizulin 68'	Report	Aslanyan 44'	Stadium: Luzhniki Stadium; Referee: A.Kirillov

5 September 1992 20	Spartak Moscow	1 – 1	CSKA Moscow	Moscow
MSK (DST) (UTC+4)	Piatnitski 35'	Report	Faizulin 55'	Stadium: Luzhniki Stadium; Referee: Filippov

10 September 1992 21	CSKA Moscow	4 – 0	Rostselmash	Moscow
MSK (DST) (UTC+4)	Sergeyev 58', 62', 69'; Faizulin 82'	Report	Kovtun (yellow card) 25'	Stadium: Luzhniki Stadium; Referee: Taras Bezubyak

26 September 1992 22	Lokomotiv Nizhny Novgorod	1 – 1	CSKA Moscow	Nizhny Novgorod
MSK (DST) (UTC+4)	Gorelov 75'		Sergeyev 10'	Stadium: Lokomotiv Stadium; Referee: Alexander Rumyantsev

4 October 1992 23	CSKA Moscow	1 – 2	Spartak Moscow	Moscow
MSK (DST) (UTC+4)	Sergeyev 6' (yellow card) 36'; Bystrov (yellow card) 48'; Ivanov (yellow card) 51'	Report	Cherchesov (red card) 58'; Pisarev 62'; Piatnitski 66'	Stadium: Luzhniki Stadium; Referee: V.Ovchinnikov

17 October 1992 24	Asmaral Moscow	2 – 5	CSKA Moscow	Moscow
MSK (DST) (UTC+4)	Storchak 83'; Putilin 90'	Report	Grishin 16', 32', 47'; Sergeyev 24'; Ivanov 72'	Stadium: Lokomotiv Stadium; Referee: Alexey Spirin

31 October 1992 25	CSKA Moscow	0 – 2	Lokomotiv Nizhny Novgorod	Moscow
MSK (UTC+3)	Kolotovkin (yellow card) 16'; Ivanov (yellow card) 78'	Report	Cheryshev 11', 65'; Maslyayev (yellow card) 46'	Stadium: Luzhniki Stadium; Referee: Lom-Ali Ibragimov

8 November 1992 26	Rostselmash	0 – 1	CSKA Moscow	Rostov-on-Don
MSK (UTC+3)		Report	Grishin 29'; Fokin (yellow card) 31'; Matveyev (yellow card) 57'	Stadium: Olimp-2; Referee: Y.Chebotarev

===== League table =====
Pos	Team	Pld	W	D	L	GF	GA	GD	Pts	Qualification
3	Dynamo Moscow	14	6	4	4	26	21	+5	16	Qualification to UEFA Cup first round
4	Lokomotiv Moscow	14	5	5	4	14	15	−1	15	Qualification to UEFA Cup first round
5	CSKA Moscow	14	5	4	5	25	19	+6	14	
6	Lokomotiv N.N.	14	2	7	5	10	18	−8	11	
7	Asmaral Moscow	14	3	3	8	17	36	−19	9	

Source: rsssf.com
Rules for classification: 1) points; 2) goal difference; 3) number of goals scored.

=== Russian Cup ===
==== 1992-93 ====
7 October 1992 Round of 32	Smena-Saturn St.Petersburg	1 – 2	CSKA Moscow	Saint Petersburg
MSK (DST) (UTC+4)	Lapushkin 78' (pen.)	Report	Grishin 29', 72'; Faizulin (yellow card) 70'	Stadium: Smena Stadium; Attendance: 6,500; Referee: Gennadi Yarygin

14 November 1992 Round of 16	CSKA Moscow	5 – 1	Shinnik Yaroslavl	Moscow
MSK (UTC+3)	Karsakov 25'; Faizulin 37'; Grishin 41' (pen.); Ivanov (yellow card) 61' (goal) 66'; Kolesnikov 64'	Report	Gladyshev 21'; Zavadskiy (yellow card) 57'	Stadium: Light-Athletic Football Complex CSKA; Attendance: 2,000; Referee: Nikolai Yegorov

The Quarterfinal took place during the 1993 season.

=== UEFA Champions League ===
==== First round ====
16 September 1992 1st leg	Vikingur Reykjavik (Iceland)	0 – 1	(Russia) CSKA Moscow	Reykjavík, Iceland
20:30 MSK (DST) (UTC+4)		Report	Mashkarin (yellow card) 31'; Karsakov 75'	Stadium: Víkingsvöllur; Attendance: 2,000; Referee: Gerald Ashby (England)

30 September 1992 2nd leg	CSKA Moscow (Russia)	4 – 2 (5 – 2 agg.)	(Iceland) Vikingur Reykjavik	Moscow, Russia
19:30 MSK (DST) (UTC+4)	Sergeyev 24'; Karsakov 37'; Grishin 45'; Ivanov (yellow card) 64'; Fokin (yellow card) 75'; Kolesnikov 89'	Report	Einarsson 32'; Magnússon (yellow card) 63'; Steinsson 76'	Stadium: Grigory Fedotov Stadium; Attendance: 10,000; Referee: Erman Toroğlu (Turkey)

==== Second round ====
21 October 1992 1st leg	CSKA Moscow (Russia)	1 – 1	(Spain) Barcelona	Moscow, Russia
20:00 MSK (DST) (UTC+4)	Grishin 16'; Minko (yellow card) 28'; Sergeyev (yellow card) 55'	Report	Begiristain (yellow card) 56' (goal) 58'	Stadium: Luzhniki Stadium; Attendance: 40,000; Referee: Kurt Röthlisberger (Switzerland)

4 November 1992 2nd leg	Barcelona (Spain)	2 – 3 (3 – 4 agg.)	(Russia) CSKA Moscow	Barcelona, Spain
22:45 MSK (UTC+3)	Nadal 12'; Begiristain 31'	Report	Fokin (yellow card) 27'; Bushmanov 44'; Mashkarin 57'; Karsakov 61'	Stadium: Camp Nou; Attendance: 80,000; Referee: Bernd Heynemann (Germany)

==== Group stage ====
Team	Pld	W	D	L	GF	GA	GD	Pts
(France) Marseille	6	3	3	0	14	4	+10	9
(Scotland) Rangers	6	2	4	0	7	5	+2	8
(Belgium) Club Brugge	6	2	1	3	5	8	−3	5
(Russia) CSKA Moscow	6	0	2	4	2	11	−9	2

25 November 1992 1	Club Brugge (Belgium)	1 – 0	(Russia) CSKA Moscow	Bruges, Belgium
22:30 MSK (UTC+3)	Amokachi 17' (yellow card) 68'	Report	Bystrov (yellow card) 72'; Malyukov (yellow card) 85'	Stadium: Olympiastadion; Attendance: 21,500; Referee: Bo Karlsson (Sweden)

9 December 1992 2	CSKA Moscow (Russia)	0 – 1	(Scotland) Rangers	Bochum, Germany
22:30 MSK (UTC+3)	Guschin (yellow card) 52'; Fokin (yellow card) 76'	Report	Ferguson 13'	Stadium: Ruhrstadion; Attendance: 9,000; Referee: Kim Milton Nielsen (Denmark)

Matches 3-6 took place during the 1993 season.

== Squad statistics ==
As of match played 9 December 1992

=== Appearances and goals ===
No.	Pos	Nat	Player	Total		Top League		Russian Cup		Champions League	
No.	Pos	Nat	Player	Apps	Goals	Apps	Goals	Apps	Goals	Apps	Goals
	GK	(Russia) RUS	Aleksandr Guteyev	6	0	2+1	0	1	0	1+1	0
	GK	(Russia) RUS	Dmitri Kharine	29	0	23	0	1	0	5	0
	GK	(Russia) RUS	Platon Zakharchuk	1	0	1	0	0	0	0	0
	DF	(Russia) RUS	Yevgeni Bushmanov	14	1	5+2	0	2	0	4+1	1
	DF	(Russia) RUS	Dmitri Bystrov	26	1	20	1	0+1	0	5	0
	DF	(Russia) RUS	Sergei Fokin	16	1	10	1	1	0	5	0
	DF	(Russia) RUS	Aleksei Guschin	30	0	21+2	0	1	0	6	0
	DF	(Russia) RUS	Sergei Kolotovkin	24	0	17	0	2	0	5	0
	DF	(Russia) RUS	Oleg Malyukov	20	0	13+1	0	2	0	4	0
	DF	(Russia) RUS	Valeri Minko	24	0	12+6	0	2+1	0	3	0
	DF	(Russia) RUS	Mikhail Sinyov	1	0	1	0	0	0	0	0
	MF	(Russia) RUS	Yuri Bavykin	21	0	11+8	0	0+1	0	0+1	0
	MF	(Russia) RUS	Aleksei Bobrov	6	0	1+5	0	0	0	0	0
	MF	(Russia) RUS	Aleksandr Grishin	27	15	16+5	10	2	3	3+1	2
	MF	(Russia) RUS	Andrei Ilyaskin	7	1	3+4	1	0	0	0	0
	MF	(Russia) RUS	Vasili Ivanov	28	3	20+2	2	0+1	1	3+2	0
	MF	(Russia) RUS	Dmitri Karsakov	21	5	8+5	1	2	1	3+3	3
	MF	(Russia) RUS	Mikhail Kolesnikov	18	1	9+4	0	2	1	2+1	0
	MF	(Russia) RUS	Sergei Krutov	12	1	8+3	1	0+1	0	0	0
	MF	(Russia) RUS	Dmitri Kuznetsov	7	5	6+1	5	0	0	0	0
	MF	(Russia) RUS	Denis Mashkarin	28	4	21	3	2	0	4+1	1
	MF	(Russia) RUS	Aleksei Poddubskiy	12	0	5+6	0	0+1	0	0	0
	MF	(Russia) RUS	Vladislav Radimov	1	0	0+1	0	0	0	0	0
	FW	(Russia) RUS	Ilshat Faizulin	31	7	20+3	6	2	1	5+1	0
	FW	(Russia) RUS	Lev Matveyev	15	1	9+6	1	0	0	0	0
	FW	(Russia) RUS	Oleg Sergeyev	24	9	14+2	8	2	0	6	1
Players who left CSKA Moscow during the season:
	DF	(Russia) RUS	Aleksandr Solop	2	0	2	0	0	0	0	0
	FW	(Russia) RUS	Igor Makarov	5	0	0+5	0	0	0	0	0
	FW	(Russia) RUS	Valeri Masalitin	7	3	6+1	3	0	0	0	0

=== Goal scorers ===
Place	Position	Nation	Name	Top League	Russian Cup	Champions League	Total
1	MF	(Russia)	Aleksandr Grishin	10	3	1	14
2	FW	(Russia)	Oleg Sergeyev	8	0	1	9
3	FW	(Russia)	Ilshat Faizulin	6	1	0	7
4	MF	(Russia)	Dmitri Kuznetsov	5	0	0	5
4	MF	(Russia)	Dmitri Karsakov	1	1	3	5
6	MF	(Russia)	Denis Mashkarin	3	0	1	4
7	FW	(Russia)	Valeri Masalitin	3	0	0	3
7	MF	(Russia)	Vasili Ivanov	2	1	0	3
9	DF	(Russia)	Valeri Minko	2	0	0	2
9	MF	(Russia)	Mikhail Kolesnikov	0	1	1	2
11	DF	(Russia)	Dmitri Bystrov	1	0	0	1
11	FW	(Russia)	Lev Matveyev	1	0	0	1
11	FW	(Russia)	Sergei Krutov	1	0	0	1
11	DF	(Russia)	Sergei Fokin	1	0	0	1
11	MF	(Russia)	Andrei Ilyaskin	1	0	0	1
11	DF	(Russia)	Yevgeni Bushmanov	0	0	1	1
			TOTALS	45	7	8	60

=== Clean sheets ===
Place	Position	Nation	Name	Top League	Russian Cup	Champions League	Total
1	GK	(Russia)	Dmitri Kharine	7	0	1	8
2	GK	(Russia)	Aleksandr Guteyev	2	0	0	2
			TOTALS	9	0	1	10

=== Disciplinary record ===
Nation	Position	Name	Top League		Russian Cup		Champions League		Total	
Nation	Position	Name	Booked	Sent off (straight red)	Booked	Sent off (straight red)	Booked	Sent off (straight red)	Booked	Sent off (straight red)
(Russia)	GK	Dmitri Kharine	2	0	0	0	0	0	2	0
(Russia)	DF	Dmitri Bystrov	3	0	0	0	1	0	4	0
(Russia)	DF	Sergei Fokin	2	0	0	0	3	0	5	0
(Russia)	DF	Aleksei Guschin	1	0	0	0	1	0	2	0
(Russia)	DF	Sergei Kolotovkin	3	0	0	0	0	0	3	0
(Russia)	DF	Oleg Malyukov	1	0	0	0	1	0	2	0
(Russia)	DF	Valeri Minko	0	0	0	0	1	0	1	0
(Russia)	DF	Aleksandr Solop	1	0	0	0	0	0	1	0
(Russia)	MF	Aleksandr Grishin	2	0	0	0	0	0	2	0
(Russia)	MF	Vasili Ivanov	4	0	1	0	1	0	6	0
(Russia)	MF	Denis Mashkarin	1	0	0	0	1	0	2	0
(Russia)	MF	Aleksei Poddubskiy	1	0	0	0	0	0	1	0
(Russia)	FW	Ilshat Faizulin	0	0	1	0	0	0	1	0
(Russia)	FW	Valeri Masalitin	1	0	0	0	0	0	1	0
(Russia)	FW	Lev Matveyev	1	0	0	0	0	0	1	0
(Russia)	FW	Oleg Sergeyev	3	0	0	0	1	0	4	0
		TOTALS	26	0	2	0	10	0	38	0
