= 1992 Soviet Cup final =

- Event: 1991–92 Soviet Cup
Spartak Moscow	CSKA Moscow
2	0
- Date: 10 May 1992
- Venue: Luzhniki Stadium, Moscow
- Referee: Andrei Butenko (Moscow)
- Attendance: 42,000
- Weather: 18 °C

The 1992 Soviet Cup final was a football match that took place at the Luzhniki Stadium, Moscow, on 10 May 1992. The Soviet Union was in the process of being dismantled with all organizations such as the Football Federation of the Soviet Union abandoned. Therefore, the game was administered by the Russian Football Union.

The match was the 51st Soviet Cup Final and it was contested by FC Spartak Moscow and PFC CSKA Moscow. The Soviet Cup winner Spartak qualified for the Cup Winners' Cup first round for the Russian Federation. Spartak played their 15th Cup Final winning on 10 occasions including this one. CSKA came to the final as the defending champions and it was their eighth Cup Final and for the third time they were defeated at this stage.

== Road to Moscow ==
All sixteen Soviet Top League clubs did not have to go through qualification to get into the competition, so Spartak and CSKA both qualified for the competition automatically.

Spartak Moscow

Round 1 (1st leg)	Gastello	2–4	Spartak
Round 1 (2nd leg)	Spartak	2–1	Gastello
	(Spartak won 6–3 on aggregate)		
Round 2 (1st leg)	Köpetdag	0–0	Spartak
Round 2 (2nd leg)	Spartak	2–1	Köpetdag
	(Spartak won 2–1 on aggregate)		
Quarter-final	Krylya Sovetov	0–1 aet	Spartak
Semi-final	Lokomotiv Moscow	0–2	Spartak

CSKA Moscow

Round 1 (1st leg)	Asmaral	0–2	CSKA
Round 1 (2nd leg)	CSKA	3–2	Asmaral
	(CSKA won 5–2 on aggregate)		
Round 2 (1st leg)	Pakhtakor	1–1	CSKA
Round 2 (2nd leg)	CSKA	3–2	Pakhtakor
	(CSKA won 4–3 on aggregate)		
Quarter-final	CSKA	+ - –	Chornomorets
Semi-final	CSKA	2–0	Pamir

== Previous encounters ==
Previously these two teams met each other in the early editions of the competition on several occasions. However this was their first time and the last that they met in the finals of the Soviet Cup.

== Match details ==
1992-05-10
?:? LST

Spartak Moscow	2 – 0	CSKA Moscow
Vladimir Bestschastnykh 20', 35'	Report	Dmitriy Kharine missed penalty 45'

Luzhniki Stadium, Moscow
Attendance: 42,000
Referee: Andrei Butenko (Moscow)

FC Spartak Moscow	PFC CSKA Moscow

FC Spartak Moscow:
1	(Russia) Stanislav Cherchesov (c)
3	(Russia) Dmitriy Khlestov
4	(Russia) Andrei Ivanov
6	(Russia) Dmitriy Popov
2	(Georgia (country)) Kakhaber Tskhadadze
5	(Russia) Viktor Onopko
11	(Russia) Andrei Chernyshov
10	(Russia) Valeriy Karpin (substituted off) 80'
8	(Russia) Andrei Piatnitski (substituted off) 73'
7	(Russia) Igor Lediakhov
9	(Russia) Vladimir Bestschastnykh (substituted off) 88'
Substitutes:
14	(Russia) Dmitriy Radchenko (substituted on) 80'
15	(Tajikistan) Rashid Rakhimov (substituted on) 73'
16	(Russia) Aleksandr Tatarkin (substituted on) 88'
Manager:
(Russia) Oleg Romantsev

PFC CSKA Moscow:
1	(Russia) Dmitriy Kharine
2	(Russia) Valeriy Minko
3	(Russia) Sergei Kolotovkin
4	(Russia) Dmitriy Bystrov
5	(Russia) Oleg Malyukov
6	(Russia) Mikhail Kolesnikov (c) (substituted off) 46'
7	(Russia) Denis Mashkarin (substituted off) 50'
8	(Russia) Aleksei Poddubskiy
9	(Russia) Oleg Sergeyev
10	(Russia) Sergey Krutov
11	(Russia) Lev Matveyev (substituted off) 25'
Substitutes:
13	(Russia) Vasili Ivanov (substituted on) 46'
14	(Russia) Ilshat Faizulin (substituted on) 25'
15	(Russia) Aleksandr Grishin (substituted on) 50'
Manager:
(Russia) Pavel Sadyrin

MATCH OFFICIALS

- Assistant referees:
  - Viktor Filippov (Moscow)
  - Sergei Khusainov (Moscow)
- Fourth official: ( )

MATCH RULES

- 90 minutes.
- 30 minutes of extra-time if necessary.
- Penalty shoot-out if scores still level.
- Seven named substitutes
- Maximum of 3 substitutions.

Soviet Cup 1992 winners
Spartak Moscow
Tenth title

== See also ==
- Soviet Top League 1991
- Main Moscow derby
