= Onufriyev =

Onufriev (masculine, Russian: Онуфриев), feminine: Onufrieva is a Russian patronymic surname derived from the given name Onufri, Onouphrios. Alternative transliterations include Onufriyev/Onufriyeva, Onoufriev/Onoufrieva. Notable people with the surname include:

- Ivan Onufriyev (1967–2026), Russian footballer
- Ivan Onufriyev (1967–2026), Russian footballer

== See also ==
- Anufriev
