= Chekunov =

Chekunov (masculine, Russian: Чекунов) or Chekunova (feminine, Russian: Чекунова) is a Russian surname. Notable people with the surname include:

- Andrei Chekunov (born 1966), Georgian football official and player
- Vladimir Chekunov (born 1983), Russian footballer

== See also ==
- Chekanov
