= Ruslyakov =

Ruslyakov (Russian: Русляков) is a Russian masculine surname, its feminine counterpart is Ruslyakova. It may refer to

- Irina Ruslyakova (born 1975), Russian badminton player
- Mikhail Ruslyakov (born 1972), Russian football player
- Valentin Ruslyakov (born 1972), Ukrainian judoka
