= Mikhail Kolesnikov =

Mikhail Kolesnikov may refer to:

- Mikhail Kolesnikov (politician) (1939–2007), former Russian Defense minister
- Mikhail Kolesnikov (footballer) (born 1966), Soviet and Russian footballer
