= Umyarov =

Umyarov is a surname. Notable people with the surname include:

- Nail Umyarov (born 2000), Russian footballer
- Ravil Umyarov (born 1962), Russian professional football coach and former player
