= Anufriev =

Anufriev (masculine, Russian: Ануфриев) or Anufrieva (feminine, Russian: Ануфриева) is a Russian patronymic surname derived from the given name Anufri, Onouphrios. Alternative transliterations include Anufriyev/Anufriyeva, Anoufriev/Anoufrieva.

Notable people with the surname include:

- Aleksandr Anufriyev (1926–1966), Soviet athlete
- Aleksandra Anufrieva (born 2010), Russian artistic gymnast
- Oleg Anofriyev (1930–2018), Soviet and Russian actor and singer.
- Olga Anufriyeva (born 1974), Russian politician

== See also ==
- Onufriyev
