= Marat Safin (disambiguation) =

Marat Safin is a Russian tennis player.

Marat Safin may also refer to:

- Marat Safin (footballer, born 1985)
- Marat Safin (footballer, born 1972)
