= Andrei Netunayev =

Russian footballer

Personal information
- Full name: Andrei Anatolyevich Netunayev
- Date of birth: 5 September 1960 (age 66)
- Height: 1.73 m (5 ft 8 in)
- Positions: Defender; midfielder

Senior career*
Years	Team	Apps	(Gls)
1984–1985	FC Tselinnik Tselinograd	14	(0)
1987–1994	FC Okean Nakhodka	177	(0)
1993	→ FC Okean-d Nakhodka (loan)	16	(0)
- * Club domestic league appearances and goals

Andrei Anatolyevich Netunayev (Russian: Андрей Анатольевич Нетунаев; born 5 September 1960) is a former Russian football player.
