= Sergey Kozlov =

Sergey Kozlov or Sergei Kozlov may refer to

- Sergey Kozlov (futsal player) (born 1961), Soviet futsal player, founder and president of MFK Dina Moskva
- Sergey Kozlov (cinematographer) (born 1964), Russian-born American cinematographer
- Sergey Kozlov (footballer) (1960–2014), Russian football player and manager
- Sergey Kozlov (politician) (born 1963), Prime Minister of the unrecognized Luhansk People's Republic
