= Aleksandr Averyanov (footballer, born 1948) =

Russian footballer (1948–2021)

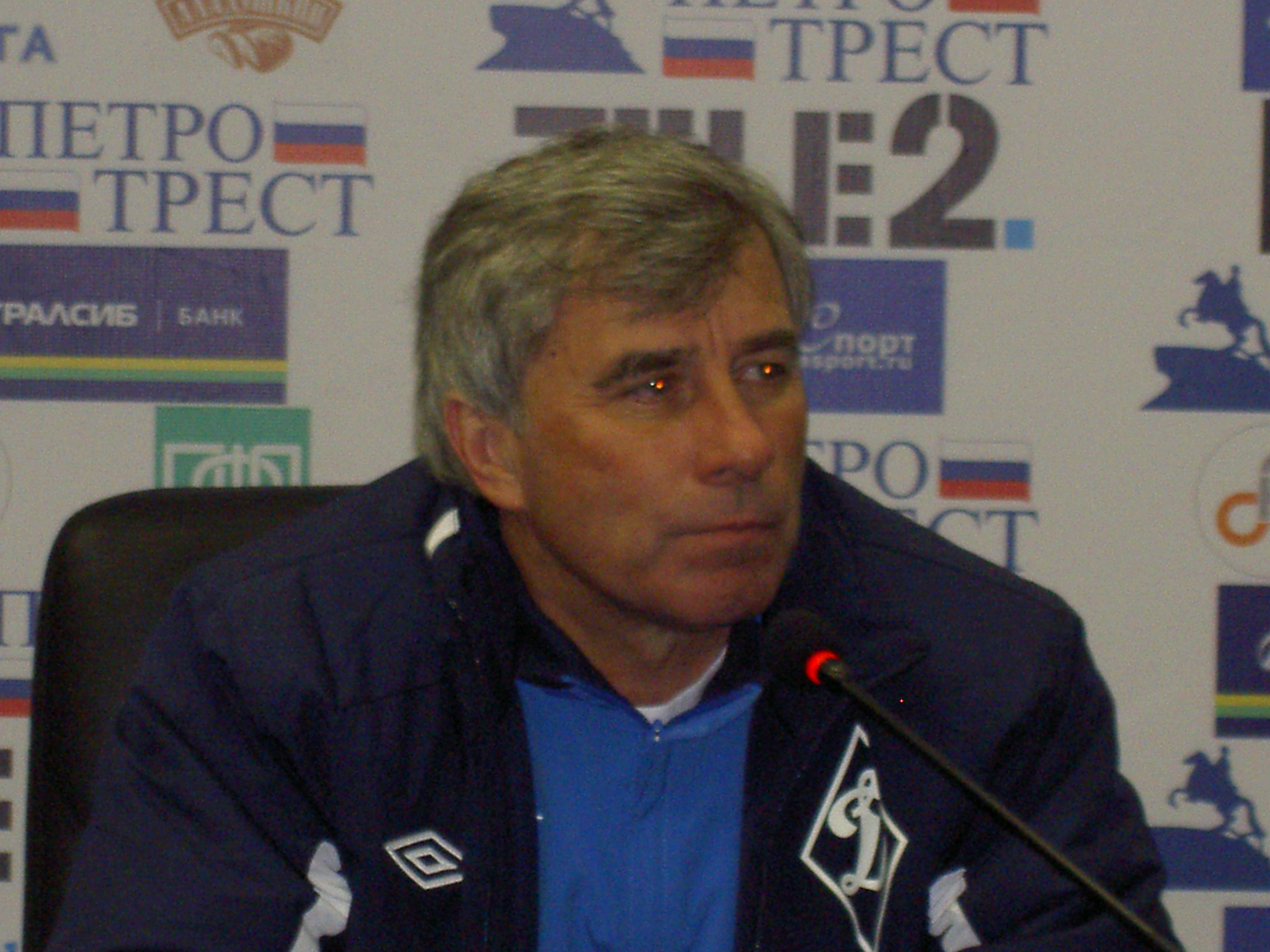

Personal information
- Full name: Aleksandr Nikolayevich Averyanov
- Date of birth: 1 October 1948
- Place of birth: Vladivostok, Russian SFSR, Soviet Union
- Date of death: 15 June 2021 (aged 72)
- Place of death: Moscow, Russia
- Height: 1.63 m (5 ft 4 in)
- Positions: Midfielder; striker

Youth career
- –1961: Shakhtar Horlivka
- 1962–1965: DYuSSh-3 Mykolaiv

Senior career*
Years	Team	Apps	(Gls)
1966–1969	Chernomorets Odessa	9	(0)
1969–1971	Sudostroitel Nikolayev	115	(7)
1971–1972	Zvezda Tiraspol		(8)
1973–1974	Sudostroitel Nikolayev	45	(14)
1975	Zarya Voroshilovhrad	25	(4)
1976	Lokomotiv Moscow	5	(0)
1976	Sudostroitel Nikolayev	8	(2)
1976–1982	Lokomotiv Moscow	161	(22)

Managerial career
- 1984: Tekstilshchik Andijan
- 1985: Shakhrikhanets Shahrikhon
- 1986–1987: Pakhtakor Andijan
- 1988: Metallurg Olmaliq
- 1989–1993: Okean Nakhodka
- 1994: Spartak Anapa
- 1994–1998: Krylia Sovetov Samara
- 1998–1999: Shinnik Yaroslavl
- 1999–2000: Uralan Elista
- 2000–2001: Alania Vladikavkaz
- 2001: Fakel Voronezh
- 2003: Volgar-Gazprom Astrakhan
- 2005: Metallurg-Kuzbass Novokuznetsk
- 2006: Atyrau
- 2006–2009: Gazovik Orenburg
- 2010: Dynamo St. Petersburg
- 2011–2012: Andijon
- 2012–2013: Oryol
- 2015–2016: Znamya Truda Orekhovo-Zuyevo
- 2017–2021: Yunost Moskvy-Torpedo Moscow (academy)
- * Club domestic league appearances and goals

Aleksandr Nikolayevich Averyanov (Russian: Александр Николаевич Аверьянов; 1 October 1948 – 15 June 2021) was a Soviet and Russian professional football coach and player.

== Playing career ==
As a player, Averyanov made his debut in the Soviet Top League in 1966 for Chornomorets Odessa.

== Managerial career ==
He started his managing career at Tekstilshhik Andijan in 1984. In 2010, he managed Dynamo St. Petersburg.

== Personal life ==
His son, Aleksandr, played football professionally, often in the teams his father coached.

Averyanov died on 15 June 2021 at the age of 72.
