= Vyacheslav Popov =

Vyacheslav Popov may refer to:

- Vyacheslav Popov (footballer)
- Vyacheslav Popov (admiral)
