= Aleksandr Averyanov (footballer, born 1969) =

Russian footballer

Personal information
- Full name: Aleksandr Aleksandrovich Averyanov
- Date of birth: 23 September 1969 (age 57)
- Place of birth: Mykolaiv, Ukrainian SSR
- Height: 1.70 m (5 ft 7 in)
- Position: Midfielder

Senior career*
Years	Team	Apps	(Gls)
1985–1986	FShM Moscow		
1986–1987	Pakhtakor Andijan	47	(0)
1988	Metallurg Olmaliq	17	(0)
1988	Torpedo Lutsk	1	(0)
1988–1989	SKA Karpaty Lvov	6	(0)
1989	Podillya Khmelnytskyi	24	(0)
1990–1994	Okean Nakhodka	121	(6)
1994–1998	Krylia Sovetov Samara	132	(8)
1999	Torpedo Moscow	16	(0)
1999	→ Torpedo-2	10	(0)
2000	Uralan Elista	4	(0)
2000–2001	Alania Vladikavkaz	20	(2)
2001–2003	FC Khimki	36	(0)
2003	Volgar-Gazprom Astrakhan	19	(0)

Managerial career
- 2013–2021: FC Spartak Moscow (deputy director of sports)
- * Club domestic league appearances and goals

Aleksandr Aleksandrovich Averyanov (Russian: Александр Александрович Аверьянов; born 23 September 1969) is a retired Russian professional footballer. He made his professional debut in the Soviet Second League in 1985 for SK FShM Moscow. He played 2 games in the UEFA Cup 2000–01 for FC Alania Vladikavkaz.

His father Aleksandr Nikolayevich Averyanov was a noted football coach, Aleksandr Aleksandrovich often played on the teams managed by his father.
