= Konstantin Prilous =

Russian footballer

Personal information
- Full name: Konstantin Vladimirovich Prilous
- Date of birth: 6 May 1969 (age 57)
- Height: 1.92 m (6 ft 3 1/2 in)
- Positions: Defender; midfielder

Youth career
- FC Amur Komsomolsk-na-Amure

Senior career*
Years	Team	Apps	(Gls)
1986–1987	FC Amur Komsomolsk-na-Amure	22	(2)
1990–1991	FC Amur Komsomolsk-na-Amure	51	(1)
1992–1996	FC Luch Vladivostok	94	(9)
1996–1998	FC SKA Khabarovsk	64	(9)
1999	FC Amur-Energia Blagoveshchensk	16	(2)
2000–2001	FC Okean Nakhodka	38	(4)
2001	FC KnAAPO-Smena Komsomolsk-na-Amure (amateur)		
2002–2004	FC Smena Komsomolsk-na-Amure	56	(5)
2006	FC Birobidzhan		
- * Club domestic league appearances and goals

Konstantin Vladimirovich Prilous (Russian: Константин Владимирович Прилоус; born 6 May 1969) is a former Russian football player.
