= Vasili Grytsan =

Russian footballer

Personal information
- Full name: Vasili Ivanovich Grytsan
- Date of birth: 10 August 1967 (age 59)
- Height: 1.77 m (5 ft 9 1/2 in)
- Positions: Defender; midfielder

Senior career*
Years	Team	Apps	(Gls)
1985	FC Podillya Khmelnytskyi	27	(0)
1987	FC Podillya Khmelnytskyi	13	(0)
1988–1993	FC Okean Nakhodka	189	(0)
1999–2002	FC Okean Nakhodka	50	(0)
2002	FC Neftyanik Nogliki		
- * Club domestic league appearances and goals

Vasili Ivanovich Grytsan (Russian: Василий Иванович Грыцан; born 10 August 1967) is a former Russian professional footballer.

== Club career ==
He made his professional debut in the Soviet Second League in 1985 for FC Podillya Khmelnytskyi.
