= Yuri Novoseltsev =

Russian-Ukrainian footballer

Personal information
- Full name: Yuri Yevgenyevich Novoseltsev
- Date of birth: 26 March 1964 (age 62)
- Height: 1.74 m (5 ft 8 1/2 in)
- Position: Defender

Senior career*
Years	Team	Apps	(Gls)
1986–1987	FC Pakhtakor Andijan	43	(7)
1988	FC Metallurg Olmaliq	32	(2)
1989–1990	FC Okean Nakhodka	75	(15)
1990	FC Druzhba Maykop	1	(0)
1991–1992	FC Okean Nakhodka	61	(8)
1993	FC Metalurh Zaporizhya	10	(1)
1994–1995	FC Dnistrovets Bilhorod-Dnistrovskyi	75	(19)
1996	FC Viktor Zaporizhzhia	12	(1)
1996–1997	FC Khimik Zhytomyr	3	(0)
- * Club domestic league appearances and goals

Yuri Yevgenyevich Novoseltsev (Russian: Юрий Евгеньевич Новосельцев; born 26 March 1964) is a former Russian football player. He also holds Ukrainian citizenship.
