= Kharin =

Kharin (masculine, Russian: Харин) or Kharina (feminine, Russian: Харина) is a Russian surname.

This surname is shared by the following people:

== Kharin ==
- Dmitri Kharine (born 1968), Russian former professional footballer turned goalkeeping coach
- Mikhail Kharin (born 1976), Russian professional football coach and a former player
- Pavel Kharin (1927–2023), Soviet-Russian sprint canoer
- Sergei Kharin (born 1963), Russian professional ice hockey player
- Vladimir Kharin (footballer) (born 1964), Russian professional football player
- Vladimir Kharin (zoologist) (1957–2013), Russian zoologist, ichthyologist, herpetologist
- Yevgeni Kharin (born 1995), Russian professional football player

== Kharina ==
- Eudoxia Nikolaevna Kharina, mother of Nikolai Kulikovsky (1881–1958), the second husband of Grand Duchess Olga Alexandrovna of Russia, the sister of Tsar Nicholas II of Russia
