= Bakhodyr Rakhmanov =

Soviet and Uzbekistani footballer

Personal information
- Date of birth: 17 March 1964 (age 62)
- Place of birth: Pakhtakor, Uzbek SSR
- Height: 1.68 m (5 ft 6 in)
- Positions: Forward; midfielder

Senior career*
Years	Team	Apps	(Gls)
1981–1983	FC Shakhrikhonchi Shakhrikhan		
1985	FC Shakhrikhanets Shakhrikhan	30	(12)
1986	Pakhtakor Tashkent FK	10	(1)
1986–1987	FC Pakhtakor Andijan	45	(7)
1988–1989	FC Polissya Zhytomyr	28	(1)
1989–1990	FC Spartak Andijan	57	(26)
1990	FC Sherdor Samarkand	4	(0)
1991–1992	Navbahor Namangan	59	(10)
1993	FC Okean Nakhodka	25	(2)
1993	→ FC Okean-d Nakhodka (loan)	2	(0)
1994–1996	FC Navruz Andijan	57	(3)
- * Club domestic league appearances and goals

Bakhodyr Rakhmanov (Russian: Баходыр Рахманов; born 17 March 1964 in Pakhtakor) is a former Soviet and Uzbekistani football player.

== Honours ==
Navbahor Namangan

- Uzbekistan Cup winner: 1992
