= Eduard Posylayev =

Russian footballer

Personal information
- Full name: Eduard Vyacheslavovich Posylayev
- Date of birth: 15 December 1966 (age 59)
- Place of birth: Taganrog, Russian SFSR
- Height: 1.75 m (5 ft 9 in)
- Position: Defender

Youth career
- FC Torpedo Taganrog

Senior career*
Years	Team	Apps	(Gls)
1984–1989	FC SKA Rostov-on-Don	121	(3)
1990–1993	FC Rostselmash Rostov-on-Don	104	(5)
1992–1993	→ FC Rostselmash-2 Rostov-on-Don	10	(2)
1994	FC Lada Togliatti	11	(0)
1994	FC Zhemchuzhina Sochi	1	(0)
1995	FC Kalitva Belaya Kalitva		
1995–1996	FC SKIF Rostov-on-Don		
1996	FC Aviator Bataysk		
1996	FC Shaktyor Sholokovsky Rayon		
1997–1998	FC Zhemchuzhina Sochi	2	(1)
1997–1998	→ FC Zhemchuzhina-2 Sochi	17	(2)
1998	FC Kuban Krasnodar	11	(1)
1999	FC Maksima Rostov-on-Don		
2000–2001	FC Bataysk (amateur)		
2001	FC Shakhtyor Shakhty	12	(0)
2002	FC Bataysk (amateur)		
2002	FC Donsnab Bataysk		
2003	FC Mir-Dongazdobycha Sulin		
2004	FC Alternativa Rostov-on-Don		
- * Club domestic league appearances and goals

Eduard Vyacheslavovich Posylayev (Russian: Эдуард Вячеславович Посылаев; born 15 December 1966) is a former Russian professional footballer.

== Club career ==
He made his professional debut in the Soviet First League in 1986 for FC SKA Rostov-on-Don.
