= Yury Antanovich =

Belarusian football coach and a player

Yuri Antonovich
Personal information
- Full name: Yuri Valeryanovich Antonovich
- Date of birth: 2 June 1967 (age 59)
- Place of birth: Leningrad, Soviet Union
- Height: 1.82 m (5 ft 11 1/2 in)
- Position: Midfielder

Senior career*
Years	Team	Apps	(Gls)
1985–1988	Dinamo Brest	81	(7)
1988–1993	Dinamo Minsk	107	(13)
1993–1995	CSKA Moscow	76	(5)
1996–1998	Rostselmash	80	(3)
1999	Slavia Mozyr	18	(3)
2000–2001	Zvezda-VA-BGU Minsk	56	(12)
2007	Zvezda-BGU Minsk	3	(0)
2010	Zvezda-BGU Minsk	2	(0)

International career
1992–1997	Belarus	8	(0)

Managerial career
- 2002–2003: Zvezda-VA-BGU Minsk
- 2004–2005: Zvezda-BGU Minsk (assistant)
- 2005–2007: Zvezda-BGU Minsk
- 2008: Darida Minsk Raion (assistant)
- 2009–2011: Zvezda-BGU Minsk
- * Club domestic league appearances and goals as of 1 January 2009

Yuri Valeryanovich Antonovich (Russian: Юрий Валерьянович Антонович; born 2 June 1967) is a Belarusian professional football coach and a former player.

== Honours ==
Dinamo Minsk

- Belarusian Premier League champion: 1992, 1992–93.
- Belarusian Cup winner: 1992.

== European club competitions ==
- UEFA Cup 1988–89 with Dinamo Minsk: 2 games.
- UEFA Champions League 1992–93 with PFC CSKA Moscow: 4 games.
- UEFA Cup Winners' Cup 1994–95 with PFC CSKA Moscow: 1 game.
