= Oleg Sanko =

Russian footballer

Personal information
- Full name: Oleg Ivanovich Sanko
- Date of birth: 6 September 1970 (age 56)
- Place of birth: Shakhty, Russian SFSR
- Height: 1.78 m (5 ft 10 in)
- Position: Midfielder

Senior career*
Years	Team	Apps	(Gls)
1989–1990	FC Shakhtyor Shakhty	64	(2)
1991–1995	FC Rostselmash Rostov-on-Don	105	(6)
1995	FC Torpedo Taganrog	12	(0)
1996–1997	FC Zhemchuzhina Sochi	52	(4)
1998–1999	FC Rostselmash Rostov-on-Don	26	(1)
2000	FC Lokomotiv Nizhny Novgorod	16	(1)
2000–2001	FC Fakel Voronezh	17	(1)
2002	FC Chernomorets Novorossiysk	3	(0)
2002	FC SKA Rostov-on-Don	8	(0)
2005	FC Alternativa Rostov-on-Don		
2006	FC Taganrog	11	(1)
2007–2008	FC Nika Krasny Sulin	30	(1)
- * Club domestic league appearances and goals

Oleg Ivanovich Sanko (Russian: Олег Иванович Санько; born 6 September 1970) is a former Russian professional footballer.

== Club career ==
He made his professional debut in the Soviet Second League in 1989 for FC Shakhtyor Shakhty. He played 2 games in the UEFA Intertoto Cup 1999 for FC Rostselmash Rostov-on-Don.
