= Aleksandr Goncharenko =

Kazakhstani footballer and official

Personal information
- Full name: Aleksandr Mikhailovich Goncharenko
- Date of birth: 4 August 1959 (age 67)
- Place of birth: Semipalatinsk, Kazakh SSR
- Height: 1.78 m (5 ft 10 in)
- Position: Defender

Senior career*
Years	Team	Apps	(Gls)
1977–1979	FC Spartak Semipalatinsk		
1980–1981	FC Kairat	10	(1)
1981–1986	FC Traktor Pavlodar	132	(8)
1988–1990	FC Traktor Pavlodar	101	(9)
1991	FC Shakhter Karagandy	34	(5)
1992–1993	FC Luch Vladivostok	55	(7)
1994–1995	FC Ansat Pavlodar	17	(1)
1997	FC Traktor-2 Pavlodar	4	(4)
2000	FC Traktor Pavlodar	2	(0)

Managerial career
- 2000: FC Traktor Pavlodar
- 2005–2012: FC Irtysh Pavlodar (director)
- * Club domestic league appearances and goals

Aleksandr Mikhailovich Goncharenko (Russian: Александр Михайлович Гончаренко; born 4 August 1959 in Semipalatinsk) is a Kazakhstani football official and former player.
