= Chekanov =

Chekanov (masculine, Russian: Чеканов) or Chekanova (feminine, Russian: Чеканова) is a Russian surname. Notable people with the surname include:

- Anatoli Chekanov (born 1960), Russian football player
- Mikhail Chekanov (born 1961), Russian ice hockey coach
