= Roman Oreshchuk =

Russian footballer, agent, and official

Personal information
- Full name: Roman Gennadyevich Oreshchuk
- Date of birth: 2 September 1975 (age 51)
- Place of birth: Novorossiysk, Russian SFSR, Soviet Union
- Height: 1.95 m (6 ft 5 in)
- Position: Forward

Youth career
- Chernomorets Novorossiysk

Senior career*
Years	Team	Apps	(Gls)
1991–1992	Gekris Novorossiysk	8	(0)
1993–1994	CSKA Moscow	4	(1)
1994	Chernomorets Novorossiysk	14	(5)
1995	CSKA Moscow	2	(0)
1995	Rostselmash Rostov-on-Don	10	(4)
1996	Legia Warsaw	9	(0)
1997	Rostselmash Rostov-on-Don	13	(1)
1998–1999	Legia Warsaw	0	(0)
1999–2000	APOEL	23	(5)
2000–2001	Újpest	26	(7)
2001	Chernomorets Novorossiysk	8	(3)
2002–2003	Dynamo St. Petersburg	54	(13)
2003	Sodovik Sterlitamak	17	(23)
2004	Sokol Saratov	26	(12)
2005	Nosta Novotroitsk	30	(13)
2006	Lada Togliatti	11	(0)
2006	Salyut-Energia Belgorod	10	(2)
2007	Chernomorets Novorossiysk	14	(8)
2008	Sportakademklub Moscow	21	(4)
2008–2010	Chernomorets Novorossiysk	56	(13)

International career
1995	Russia U20	3	(0)
1995	Russia U21	4	(1)
- * Club domestic league appearances and goals

Roman Gennadyevich Oreshchuk (Russian: Роман Геннадьевич Орещук; born 2 September 1975) is a Russian professional football official and a former agent and player.

== Playing career ==
He made his debut in the Russian Premier League in 1993 for CSKA Moscow. He played two games in the 2001–02 UEFA Cup for Chernomorets Novorossiysk.

== Post-playing career ==
He was appointed the sporting director of Dynamo Moscow on 1 June 2016, and left Dynamo "by mutual consent" on 6 September 2016.

== Honours ==
Individual

- Russian Second Division Zone Ural/Povolzhye top scorer: 2003 (23 goals)
