= Gennadi Maslyayev =

Russian footballer, coach, and referee

Personal information
- Full name: Gennadi Aleksandrovich Maslyayev
- Date of birth: 21 November 1958 (age 67)
- Place of birth: Gorky (now Nizhny Novgorod), Russian SFSR
- Height: 1.74 m (5 ft 8 1/2 in)
- Positions: Defender; midfielder

Youth career
- FC Polyot Gorky

Senior career*
Years	Team	Apps	(Gls)
1978–1982	FC Polyot Gorky		
1983–1984	FC Volga Gorky	59	(5)
1985	FC Khimik Dzerzhinsk	19	(1)
1986	FC Polyot Gorky		
1987–1993	FC Lokomotiv Nizhny Novgorod	206	(6)
1993–1995	Krona Nizhny Novgorod (futsal)		
1995	FC Torpedo-Viktoriya Nizhny Novgorod	2	(0)
1995–2001	Krona Nizhny Novgorod (futsal)		
2004–2005	Titan Nizhny Novgorod (futsal)		

Managerial career
- 2001: FC Lokomotiv Nizhny Novgorod (assistant)
- 2003: FC Lokomotiv-NN Nizhny Novgorod
- 2004: FC Lokomotiv-NN Nizhny Novgorod (assistant)
- 2004: FC Lokomotiv-NN Nizhny Novgorod
- 2004–2005: FC Lokomotiv-NN Nizhny Novgorod (assistant)
- 2005: FC Lokomotiv Nizhny Novgorod
- 2006: FC Lokomotiv Nizhny Novgorod (assistant)
- 2007–2008: FC Nizhny Novgorod (assistant)
- 2009: FC Nizhny Novgorod-2 Nizhny Novgorod
- 2013–2015: FC Khimik Dzerzhinsk (assistant)
- 2016: FC Khimik Dzerzhinsk
- 2022: FC Khimik Dzerzhinsk
- * Club domestic league appearances and goals

Gennadi Aleksandrovich Maslyayev (Russian: Геннадий Александрович Масляев; born 21 November 1958) is a Russian professional football coach and a former football player.

He made his professional debut in the Soviet Second League in 1985 for FC Khimik Dzerzhinsk.

He worked as a referee from 1996 to 2001.
