= Mikhail Kupriyanov =

Russian footballer

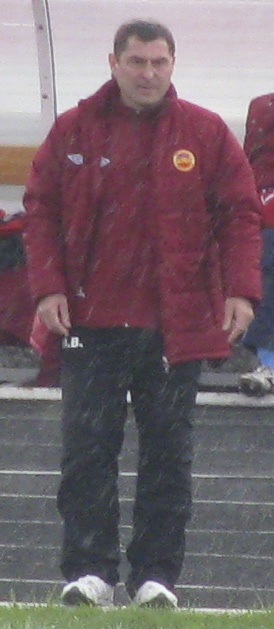

Personal information
- Full name: Mikhail Vladimirovich Kupriyanov
- Date of birth: 7 July 1973 (age 53)
- Place of birth: Makhachkala, Russian SFSR
- Height: 1.85 m (6 ft 1 in)
- Position: Defender

Senior career*
Years	Team	Apps	(Gls)
1989–1991	FC Dynamo Makhachkala	57	(3)
1992	FC SKA Rostov-on-Don	32	(2)
1993–1994	PFC CSKA Moscow	20	(0)
1994	FC Rostselmash Rostov-on-Don	4	(0)
1995–1996	FC Anzhi Makhachkala	72	(14)
1997–2000	FC Rostselmash Rostov-on-Don	112	(3)
2001	FC Spartak Moscow	4	(0)
2002	FC Rostselmash Rostov-on-Don	28	(0)
2003	FC Fakel-Voronezh Voronezh	24	(0)
2004	FC Rostov	0	(0)
2006	FC SKA Rostov-on-Don	12	(0)

International career
1994	Russia U-21	3	(0)

Managerial career
- 2010–2014: FC MITOS Novocherkassk
- 2015–2018: FC SKA Rostov-on-Don
- 2019: FC Ufa (assistant)
- 2019: FC Olimp Khimki
- 2021: FC Mashuk-KMV Pyatigorsk
- * Club domestic league appearances and goals

Mikhail Vladimirovich Kupriyanov (Russian: Михаил Владимирович Куприянов; born 7 July 1973) is a Russian professional football manager and a former player.

== Playing career ==
He made his professional debut in the Soviet Second League in 1989 for FC Dynamo Makhachkala.

== Honours ==
- Russian Premier League champion: 2001.
- Russian Cup finalist: 1994 (missed a penalty in the final game shootout).

== European club competitions ==
With FC Rostselmash Rostov-on-Don.

- UEFA Intertoto Cup 1999: 4 games.
- UEFA Intertoto Cup 2000: 2 games.
