= Sergey Kozlov (footballer) =

Russian footballer and manager

Sergey Kozlov Сергей Козлов
Personal information
- Full name: Sergey Semenovich Kozlov
- Date of birth: 4 May 1960
- Place of birth: Khabarovsk, Russian SFSR, Soviet Union
- Date of death: 4 January 2014 (aged 53)
- Place of death: Khabarovsk, Russia
- Height: 1.79 m (5 ft 10 in)
- Positions: Midfielder; defender

Youth career
- FC Amur Komsomolsk-na-Amure

Senior career*
Years	Team	Apps	(Gls)
1978–1982	FC Amur Komsomolsk-na-Amure		
1983	FC Dynamo Stavropol	5	(0)
1983	FC SKA Khabarovsk	42	(1)
1984	FC Zarafshan Navoi	28	(0)
1984–1989	FC SKA Khabarovsk	183	(14)
1990–1994	FC Okean Nakhodka	139	(16)
1993	→ FC Okean-d Nakhodka (loan)	19	(3)
1995–1996	FC SKA Khabarovsk	23	(4)

Managerial career
- 2006: FC SKA-Energiya Khabarovsk (assistant)
- 2006–2007: FC SKA-Energiya Khabarovsk
- 2007–2008: FC SKA-Energiya Khabarovsk (assistant)
- 2008: FC SKA-Energiya Khabarovsk
- 2008–2009: FC SKA-Energiya Khabarovsk (assistant)
- 2013–2014: FC Nogliki
- * Club domestic league appearances and goals

Sergey Semenovich Kozlov (Russian: Серге́й Семёнович Козло́в; 4 May 1960 – 4 January 2014) was a Russian football player and manager who primarily played as a midfielder and defender.

Kozlov played in the Russian Top League with FC Okean Nakhodka.

Sergey Kozlov died following a long illness on 4 January 2014, aged 53, in his hometown of Khabarovsk, Russia.
