= Igor Makarov (footballer, born 1970) =

Russian footballer and coach

Personal information
- Full name: Igor Yuryevich Makarov
- Date of birth: 10 June 1970 (age 56)
- Place of birth: Yuryev-Polsky, Russian SFSR
- Height: 1.85 m (6 ft 1 in)
- Positions: Forward; midfielder

Senior career*
Years	Team	Apps	(Gls)
1988	FC Torpedo Vladimir	1	(0)
1988–1989	FC Energiya Novgorod		
1990–1991	FC Zarya Kaluga	80	(37)
1992	PFC CSKA Moscow	5	(0)
1992–1994	FC Fakel Voronezh	65	(16)
1994–1995	FC Baltika Kaliningrad	23	(1)
1996	FC Rassvet Troitskoye		
1997	FC Uralmash Yekaterinburg	34	(2)
1998	FC Fakel Voronezh	4	(0)
1999	FC Metallurg Krasnoyarsk	17	(1)
1999–2000	FC Metallurg Lipetsk	48	(3)
2002	FC Lukoil Chelyabinsk	6	(0)

Managerial career
- 2004: FC Obninsk (technical director)
- 2005: FC Lokomotiv-M Serpukhov (director of sports)
- 2006: FC Fakel Voronezh (director)
- 2007–2008: FC Anzhi Makhachkala (assistant)
- 2008–2009: FC KAMAZ Naberezhnye Chelny (director of sports)
- 2010: FC Krylia Sovetov Samara (head scout)
- 2010–2012: FC Fakel Voronezh (general director)
- 2013: FC Fakel Voronezh (director of sports)
- 2017–2019: FC Khimik Novomoskovsk (assistant)
- * Club domestic league appearances and goals

Igor Yuryevich Makarov (Russian: Игорь Юрьевич Макаров; born 10 June 1970) is a Russian professional football coach and a former player.

== Club career ==
He made his professional debut in the Soviet Second League in 1988 for FC Torpedo Vladimir.

== Honours ==
- Soviet Cup finalist: 1992.
