= Aleksandr Zavadskiy =

Russian soccer player

Personal information
- Full name: Aleksandr Viktorovich Zavadskiy
- Date of birth: 24 August 1966 (age 60)
- Height: 1.86 m (6 ft 1 in)
- Position: Defender

Senior career*
Years	Team	Apps	(Gls)
1982–1989	FC Spartak Ordzhonikidze	63	(0)
1989–1992	FC Shinnik Yaroslavl	107	(3)
1992–1994	Bátaszék (Hungary)		
1994–1996	FC Gazovik-Gazprom Izhevsk	105	(5)
1997	FC Samotlor-XXI Nizhnevartovsk	23	(4)
1998–2000	FC Chkalovets-1936 Novosibirsk	49	(3)
2001	FC Metallurg-Zapsib Novokuznetsk	18	(0)
2002	FC Chkalovets-1936 Novosibirsk	5	(0)
- * Club domestic league appearances and goals

Aleksandr Viktorovich Zavadskiy (Russian: Александр Викторович Завадский; born 24 August 1966) is a retired Russian professional footballer.
