= Yuriy Dudnyk =

Ukrainian footballer (born 1968)

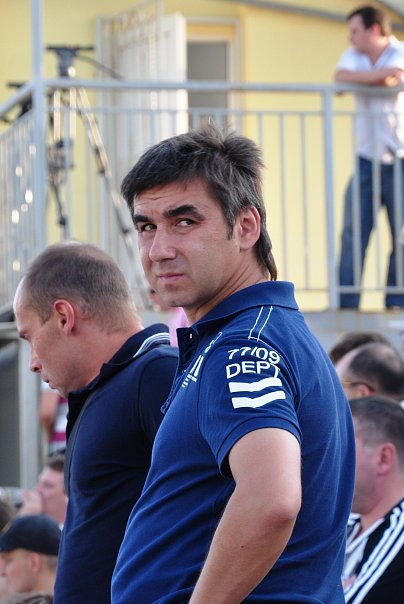

Personal information
- Full name: Yuriy Volodymyrovych Dudnyk
- Date of birth: 26 September 1968 (age 58)
- Place of birth: Luhansk, Ukrainian SSR
- Height: 1.76 m (5 ft 9 in)
- Positions: Midfielder; defender

Senior career*
Years	Team	Apps	(Gls)
1986–1987	Shaktar Donetsk	0	(0)
1988	Shakhtar Horlivka	42	(5)
1988	Tavriya Simferopol	1	(0)
1989–1993	Metalurh Zaporizhzhia	116	(9)
1993	CSKA Moscow	15	(1)
1994–1996	Metalurh Zaporizhya	54	(11)
1996–1997	Karpaty Lviv	28	(6)
1997	Rostselmash Rostov-on-Don	15	(1)
1997–1998	Karpaty Lviv	2	(0)
1998–1999	Rostselmash Rostov-on-Don	11	(1)
1999–2000	Metalurh Zaporizhya	5	(0)
2000–2001	Stal Alchevsk	8	(0)
2001–2003	Volyn Lutsk	40	(3)
2003	Nyva Vinnytsia	4	(0)
2004	Stal Alchevsk	12	(1)
2004–2005	Stal Dniprodzerzhynsk	29	(4)
2005	FC Banants	5	(1)
2005–2006	Zakarpattia Uzhhorod	9	(0)
2006–2007	Dnipro Cherkasy	4	(0)

International career
1992	Ukraine	2	(0)

Managerial career
- 2006–2007: FC Dnipro Cherkasy (assistant)
- 2007–2009: Zorya Luhansk (assistant)
- 2009: Zorya Luhansk (caretaker)
- 2009: Zorya Luhansk (assistant)
- 2010–2011: FC Zorya-2 Luhansk
- 2012–2016: Zorya Luhansk (U19)
- 2023: LNZ Cherkasy (caretaker)
- * Club domestic league appearances and goals

Yuriy Volodymyrovych Dudnyk (Ukrainian: Юрій Володимирович Дудник; born 26 September 1968) is a Ukrainian professional football coach and a former player.

== Club career ==
Dudnyk made his debut in the Soviet Second League in 1988 for Shakhtar Horlivka. He played two games in the 1992–93 UEFA Champions League for CSKA Moscow.

== Honours ==
- Ukrainian Premier League bronze: 1998
- Russian Cup finalist: 1993, 1994 (played in the early stages of the 1993–94 tournament for PFC CSKA Moscow)
