= Aleksandr Solop =

Russian footballer

Aleksandr Solop Александр Солоп
Personal information
- Full name: Aleksandr Vasilyevich Solop
- Date of birth: 23 June 1971 (age 55)
- Height: 1.85 m (6 ft 1 in)
- Position: Defender

Senior career*
Years	Team	Apps	(Gls)
1991	FC Kuban Krasnodar	37	(0)
1992	PFC CSKA Moscow	2	(0)
1992	FC Fakel Voronezh	13	(0)
1993	FC KAMAZ Naberezhnye Chelny	1	(0)
1993	FC Kolos Krasnodar	29	(0)
1994–1995	Hapoel Petah Tikva F.C.	24	(1)
1995	FC Izumrud Timashyovsk		
1996	FC Kuban Slavyansk-na-Kubani	10	(1)
1996–1997	Hapoel Be'er Sheva F.C.	29	(0)
1997	FC Kuban Slavyansk-na-Kubani	0	(0)
1999	Maccabi Netanya F.C.		
1999	FC Chernomorets Novorossiysk	0	(0)
2000	FC Volgar-Gazprom Astrakhan	0	(0)
- * Club domestic league appearances and goals

Aleksandr Vasilyevich Solop (Russian: Александр Васильевич Солоп; born 23 June 1971) is a former Russian professional footballer.

== Club career ==
He made his professional debut in the Soviet First League in 1991 for FC Kuban Krasnodar.

== Honours ==
- Soviet Cup finalist: 1992.
