= Yervand Krbachyan =

Armenian footballer and manager

Personal information
- Full name: Yervand Mesropi Krbachyan
- Date of birth: 1 October 1971 (age 55)
- Place of birth: Yerevan, Soviet Union
- Height: 1.78 m (5 ft 10 in)
- Position: Defender

Senior career*
Years	Team	Apps	(Gls)
1989–1992	Ararat Yerevan	43	(1)
1993	CSKA Moscow	11	(0)
1994	Zenit Saint Petersburg	12	(0)
1995–1997	FC Yerevan	50	(0)
1998	Pyunik Yerevan	10	(0)
1998	Irtysh Omsk	16	(0)
1999	Torpedo-ZIL Moscow	7	(0)
2002	Mika	2	(0)

International career
1991	USSR U-20		
1992–1999	Armenia	16	(0)

Managerial career
- 2007–2008: Kilikia Yerevan
Medal record
Men's football
Representing Soviet Union
FIFA World Youth Championship
Bronze medal – third place	1991 Portugal
- * Club domestic league appearances and goals

Yervand Mesropi Krbachyan (Armenian: Երվանդ Մեսրոպի Կռբաշյան, born 1 October 1971) is an Armenian former football defender and current manager. He was also capped for the USSR U-20 team at the 1991 FIFA World Youth Championship.
