= Andrei Ilyaskin =

Russian footballer

Personal information
- Full name: Andrei Grigoryevich Ilyaskin
- Date of birth: 25 July 1967 (age 59)
- Place of birth: Moscow, Soviet Union
- Height: 1.76 m (5 ft 9 1/2 in)
- Position: Midfielder

Youth career
- FShM Moscow

Senior career*
Years	Team	Apps	(Gls)
1984–1985	Lokomotiv Moscow	19	(2)
1986–1988	Iskra Smolensk	91	(16)
1989	Lokomotiv Moscow	2	(0)
1990–1991	Dynamo Bryansk	35	(3)
1991	Kuban Krasnodar	21	(3)
1992	Polonia Warsaw	3	(0)
1992	CSKA Moscow	7	(1)
1993–1997	Shinnik Yaroslavl	148	(30)
1997	Rubin Kazan	7	(1)
1998	Fakel Voronezh	8	(0)
1999	Spartak-Orekhovo Orekhovo-Zuyevo	15	(0)
2000	Dynamo Vologda	15	(1)
2000	Slavia Mozyr	4	(0)

Managerial career
- 2001: Presnya Moscow (assistant)
- 2003: Uralan Plus Moscow
- 2005: Presnya Moscow (assistant)
- 2006: Presnya Moscow (general director)
- * Club domestic league appearances and goals

Andrei Grigoryevich Ilyaskin (Russian: Андрей Григорьевич Иляскин; born 25 July 1967) is a Russian professional football coach and a former player. He made his professional debut in the Soviet First League in 1984 for Lokomotiv Moscow.

== Honours ==
- Soviet Cup runner-up: 1990 (played in the early stages of the 1989/90 tournament for FC Lokomotiv Moscow).
