= Onouphrios =

Onouphrios is a transliteration of the Greek Ονούφριος, originally from an Egyptian name, Christian name borne by Orthodox and Catholic Saints and notable people and may refer to:

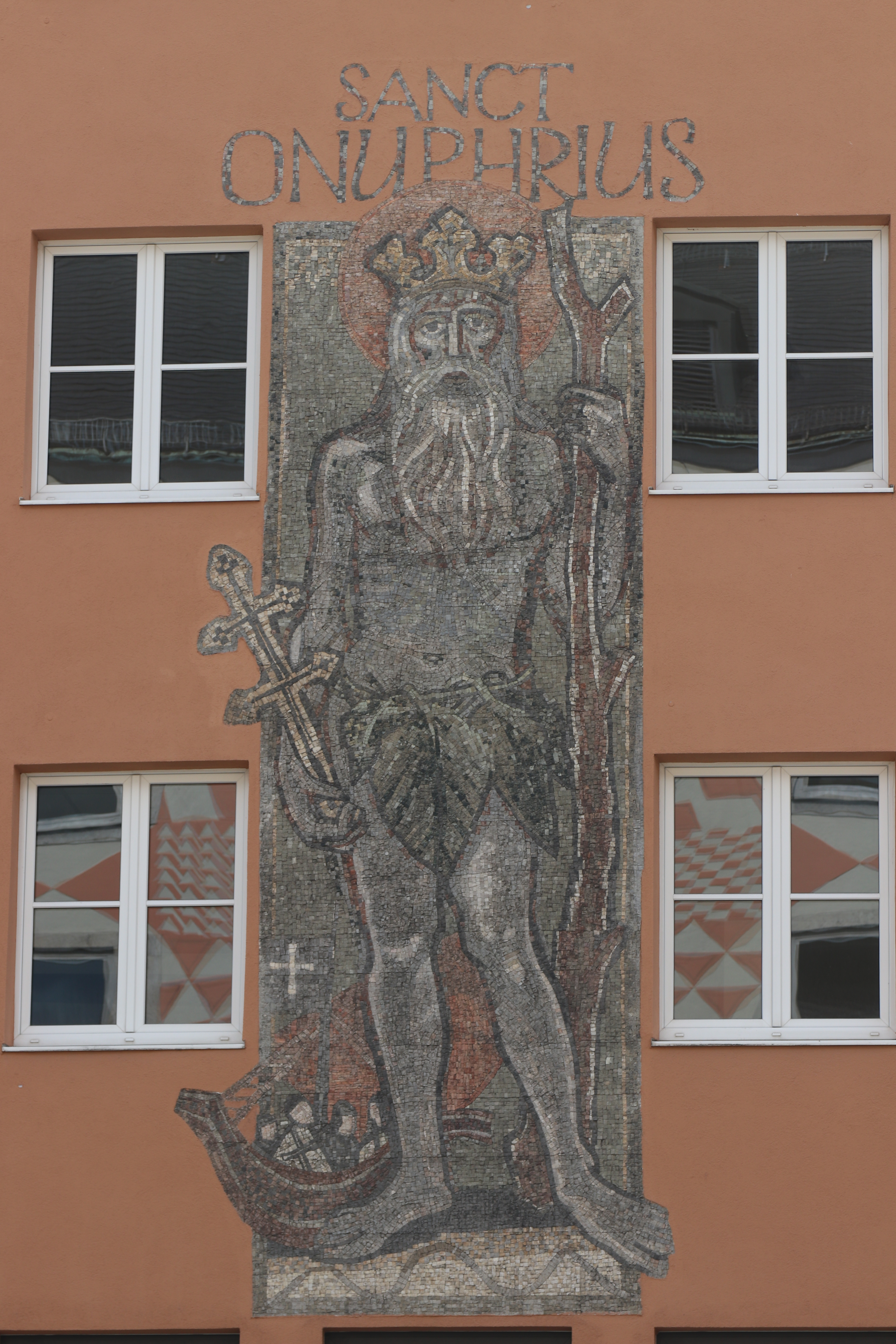
Mosaic of "Sanct Onuphrius" at the Marienplatz Square in Munich / Germany

- Saint Onouphrios of Egypt (Onuphrius), 5th century
- Saint (Martyr) Onouphrios (Gr. Οσιομάρτυς or Εθνομάρτυς Ονούφριος), (18th–19th centuries). Born as Christian in the village of Kabrova in Bulgaria, was converted to Muslim. He repented and became monk in Athos. He was beheaded by the Turks in 1818 in Chios, where he was preaching. Venerated on 4 January.
- Onouphrios Neokastrites, (16th century) Orthodox clergyman in Elbasan (formerly Neokastron) of Albania and painter. Nothing is known about his life, other than the fact that he was a priest. His origin is unknown, assumed to be from Berat (Albania), from Argos (Greece) or from Kastoria (Greece). Based in Berat he painted several portable icons, today many of them in the museum bearing his name in Albania. His works are also found in Kastoria (Greece) and Prilep (Rep. of Macedonia). He is known in Albania as Onufri.
- Onouphrios Cypriotes, (16th and 17th centuries), a painter known from portable icons found in Albania and a wall-painting in the village Vlachokoratzi of Argyrokastro (Girokaser) in Albania. It is believed that he came from Cyprus when the island was gradually conquered by the Turks. His earliest dated icon is of 1596. His works are characterized by western influences due to his origin. He was signing as "Ονούφριος ο Κυπρέος" (Onouphrios the Cypriot).(Icons Orth. Comm. Alb., pp. 84–87).
