= Marat Safin (footballer, born 1972) =

Russian footballer

Personal information
- Date of birth: 14 March 1972 (age 54)
- Place of birth: Sverdlovsk, Russian SFSR
- Height: 1.77 m (5 ft 9 1/2 in)
- Position: Forward

Youth career
- FC Uralmash Sverdlovsk

Senior career*
Years	Team	Apps	(Gls)
1989	FC MTsOP-Metallurg Verkhnyaya Pyshma	14	(0)
1991–1993	FC Uralmash Yekaterinburg	17	(1)
1994	FC Uralets Nizhny Tagil	26	(1)
1996	FC Severskiy Trubnik Polevskoy		
1998	FC RTI Yekaterinburg		
- * Club domestic league appearances and goals

Marat Safin (Russian: Марат Сафин; born 14 March 1972 in Sverdlovsk) is a former Russian football player.
