= Aleksandr Guteyev =

Russian footballer and coach

Personal information
- Full name: Aleksandr Sergeyevich Guteyev
- Date of birth: 18 June 1967 (age 59)
- Place of birth: Moscow, Russian SFSR
- Height: 1.91 m (6 ft 3 in)
- Position: Goalkeeper

Team information
- Current team: PFC Krylia Sovetov Samara (GK coach)

Senior career*
Years	Team	Apps	(Gls)
1984–1988	FC Torpedo Moscow	0	(0)
1989	FC Chayka-CSKA Moscow	40	(0)
1990–1994	PFC CSKA Moscow	26	(0)
1994	FC Kuban Krasnodar	8	(0)
1995–2001	FC Shinnik Yaroslavl	110	(0)
2003–2004	FC Shinnik Yaroslavl	0	(0)
2007	FC Shinnik Yaroslavl	0	(0)

Managerial career
- 2002–2009: FC Shinnik Yaroslavl (asst. coach)
- 2010–2016: FC Volga Nizhny Novgorod (GK coach)
- 2016–2017: FC Olimpiyets Nizhny Novgorod (GK coach)
- 2018–2019: FC Rostov (GK coach)
- 2019–2022: FC Tekstilshchik Ivanovo (GK coach)
- 2022: FC Khimki (GK coach)
- 2023–2024: FC Pari Nizhny Novgorod (GK coach)
- 2025: FC Khimki (academy GK coach)
- 2025–: PFC Krylia Sovetov Samara (GK coach)
- * Club domestic league appearances and goals

Aleksandr Sergeyevich Guteyev (Russian: Александр Серге́евич Гутеев; born 18 June 1967) is a Russian professional football coach and a former player. He is the goalkeepers' coach with PFC Krylia Sovetov Samara.

== Playing career ==
As a player, he made his debut in the Soviet Top League in 1990 for PFC CSKA Moscow.

== Honours ==
- Soviet Top League champion: 1991.
- Soviet Top League runner-up: 1990.
- Soviet Cup winner: 1991.
- Soviet Cup finalist: 1992.
- Russian Cup finalist: 1993, 1994.

== European club competitions ==
- UEFA Champions League 1992–93 with PFC CSKA Moscow: 3 games.
- UEFA Intertoto Cup 1998 with FC Shinnik Yaroslavl: 1 game.
