= Mikhail Ruslyakov =

Russian footballer

Personal information
- Full name: Mikhail Valeryevich Ruslyakov
- Date of birth: 3 March 1972 (age 54)
- Place of birth: Vladivostok, Russian SFSR
- Height: 1.65 m (5 ft 5 in)
- Position: Midfielder

Senior career*
Years	Team	Apps	(Gls)
1988–1996	FC Luch Vladivostok	248	(31)
1997–1998	FC Irtysh Omsk	40	(1)
1998–2000	FC Luch Vladivostok	67	(17)
2001	FC Selenga Ulan-Ude	25	(3)
2002	FC Severstal Cherepovets	18	(2)
2002	FC Uralets Nizhny Tagil	8	(1)
2003	FC Aviator Artyom		
2004	FC Vladrybport Vladivostok		
- * Club domestic league appearances and goals

Mikhail Valeryevich Ruslyakov (Russian: Михаил Валерьевич Русляков; born 3 March 1972) is a former Russian football player.
