= Ravil Umyarov =

Russian footballer and coach

Personal information
- Full name: Ravil Fatekovich Umyarov
- Date of birth: 9 January 1962 (age 64)
- Place of birth: Moscow, Russia
- Height: 1.75 m (5 ft 9 in)
- Positions: Forward; midfielder

Team information
- Current team: FC Tyumen (youth teams coach)

Youth career
- PFC CSKA Moscow

Senior career*
Years	Team	Apps	(Gls)
1980–1981	SKA Novosibirsk (amateur)		
1982–1994	FC Dynamo-Gazovik Tyumen	363	(28)
1994	FC Irtysh Tobolsk	4	(0)
1995–1996	FC Dynamo-Gazovik-d Tyumen	37	(8)

Managerial career
- 1997: FC Forvard Tyumen (assistant)
- 1998–2002: FC Tyumen (assistant)
- 2002: FC Forvard Tyumen (assistant)
- 2004–2009: FC Tyumen
- 2009–2011: FC Tyumen (assistant)
- 2011–2013: FC Tyumen-d
- 2011–: FC Tyumen (youth teams)
- * Club domestic league appearances and goals

Ravil Fatekovich Umyarov (Russian: Равиль Фатекович Умяров; born 9 January 1962) is a Russian professional football coach and a former player. He works as a coach for youth teams of FC Tyumen.

== Club career ==
He made his debut in the Soviet Second League in 1982 for FC Fakel Tyumen.
