= Vyacheslav Popov (footballer) =

Russian footballer

Personal information
- Full name: Vyacheslav Nikolayevich Popov
- Date of birth: 17 February 1962 (age 64)
- Place of birth: Kuybyshev, Russian SFSR
- Height: 1.85 m (6 ft 1 in)
- Position: Defender

Youth career
- Voskhod Kuybyshev

Senior career*
Years	Team	Apps	(Gls)
1979	FC Turbina Syzran	20	(0)
1980–1988	FC Krylia Sovetov Kuybyshev	238	(34)
1989–1990	Navbahor Namangan	78	(23)
1991	FC Alga Frunze	38	(4)
1992	FC Uralmash Yekaterinburg	17	(1)
1993	FC SKD Samara	24	(5)
1993–1994	Szegedi EAC	19	(1)
1994	FC Neftyanik Pokhvistnevo	9	(1)
- * Club domestic league appearances and goals

Vyacheslav Nikolayevich Popov (Russian: Вячеслав Николаевич Попов; born 17 February 1962 in Kuybyshev) is a former Russian football player.
