= Ivan Onufriyev =

Russian footballer (1967–2026)

Personal information
- Full name: Ivan Nikolayevich Onufriyev
- Date of birth: 6 August 1967
- Date of death: 13 January 2026 (aged 58)
- Height: 1.82 m (6 ft 0 in)
- Positions: Defender; midfielder

Youth career
- Geolog Tyumen

Senior career*
Years	Team	Apps	(Gls)
1984–1986	Geolog Tyumen	52	(1)
1987	Uralets Nizhny Tagil	7	(0)
1987	Montazhnik Tyumen		
1988	MTsOP-Metallurg Verkhnyaya Pyshma (amateur)		
1989	MTsOP-Metallurg Verkhnyaya Pyshma	38	(5)
1990–1992	Dynamo Stavropol	71	(1)
- * Club domestic league appearances and goals

Ivan Nikolayevich Onufriyev (Russian: Иван Николаевич Онуфриев; 6 August 1967 – 13 January 2026) was a Russian footballer who played as a defender and a midfielder. He died on 13 January 2026, at the age of 58.
