= Andrei Chekunov =

Georgian footballer and official

Personal information
- Full name: Andrei Vladimirovich Chekunov
- Date of birth: 7 September 1966 (age 60)
- Place of birth: Gagra, Georgian SSR
- Height: 1.78 m (5 ft 10 in)
- Position: Defender

Youth career
- FC Dinamo Gagra

Senior career*
| Years | Team | Apps | (Gls) |
| 1983–1987 | FC Dinamo Tbilisi | 3 | (0) |
| 1989–1990 | FC Dinamo Sukhumi | 72 | (1) |
| 1991–1995 | FC Zhemchuzhina-Sochi | 134 | (4) |
| 1996–1997 | FC Dynamo-Zhemchuzhina-2 Sochi | 38 | (1) |
| 1997–1999 | FC Volgar-Gazprom Astrakhan | 95 | (0) |
| 2000 | FC Metallurg Novokuznetsk | 25 | (0) |

Managerial career
- 2009–2011: FC Zhemchuzhina-Sochi (administrator)
- 2016–2017: FC Sochi (administrator)
- * Club domestic league appearances and goals

Andrei Vladimirovich Chekunov (Russian: Андрей Владимирович Чекунов; born 7 September 1966) is a Russian professional football official and a former player.

== Club career ==
He made his professional debut in the Soviet Top League in 1986 for FC Dinamo Tbilisi.
