= Light-Athletic Football Complex CSKA =

Sports venue in Moscow, Russia

LFK CSKA
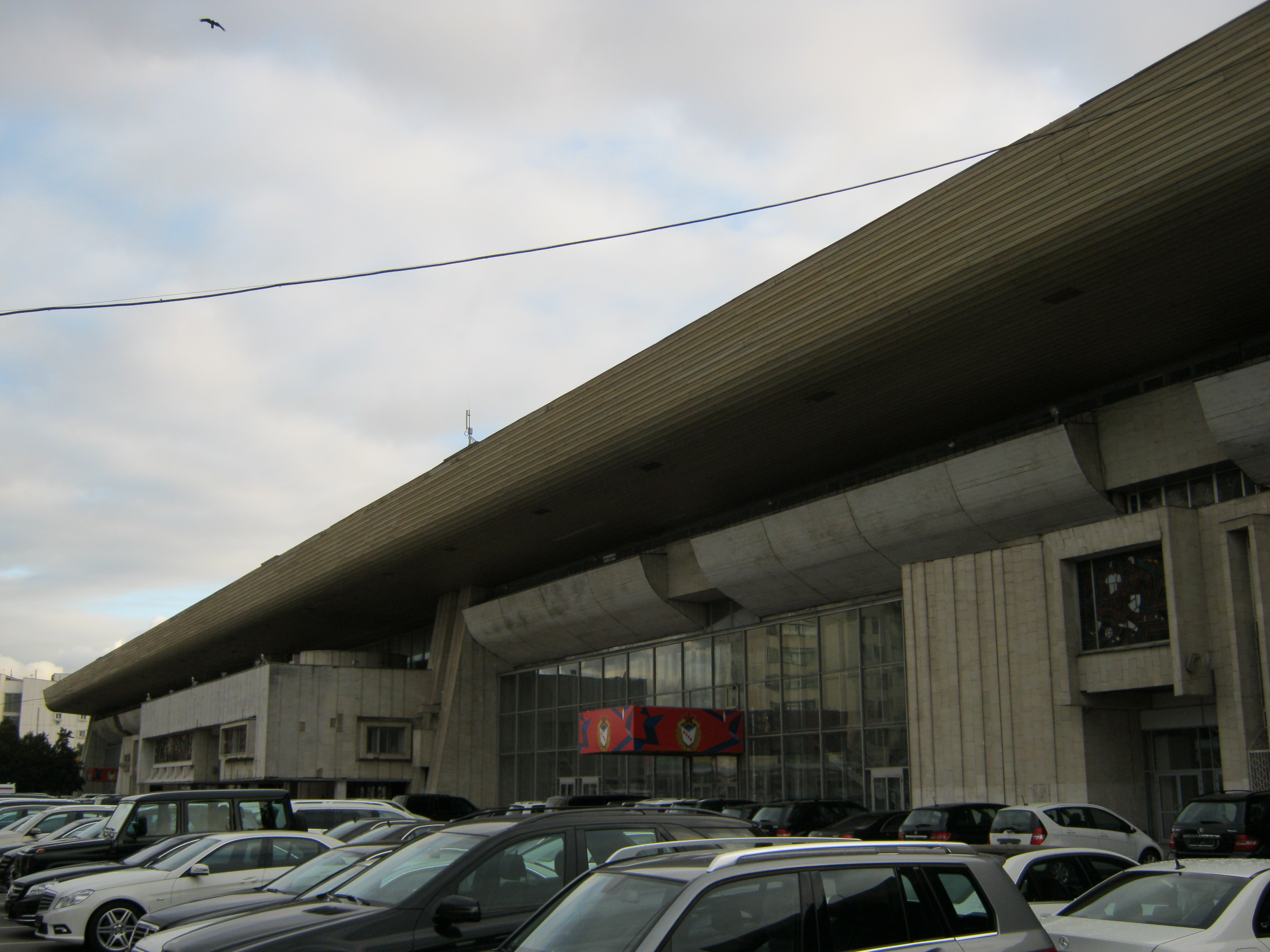
- Football and athletics manege CSKA Moscow
- Interactive map of LFK CSKA
- Full name: Light-Athletic Football Complex CSKA
- Location: Moscow, Russia
- Coordinates: 55°47′27″N 37°32′21″E
- Owner: CSKA Moscow
- Capacity: 4,000
- Surface: artificial turf
- Field size: 126x62

Construction
- Opened: 17 October 1979

Tenant
- CSKA Moscow (1979-present)

Light-Athletic Football Complex CSKA (Russian: Легкоатлетическо-футбольный комплекс ЦСКА, ЛФК) or Football Manege CSKA (Russian: Футбольный Манеж ЦСКА) is a multi-use covered stadium in Moscow, Russia. The complex is part of the CSKA Sports Complex and was originally built for the 1980 Summer Olympics.

It is used as an alternative stadium of CSKA Moscow. The capacity of the stadium was 4,000 spectators. Due to the limitation of the seating capacity, CSKA Moscow plays elsewhere and plans to move to its own new stadium in 2016.

The complex is utilized by gymnasts.

== See also ==
- Khodynka Aerodrome, the first Moscow Central Airport, initial home of the State Flight Testing Center of Ministry of Defense
- Megasport Arena is located in a close vicinity
