= Denis Mashkarin =

Russian footballer

Personal information
- Full name: Denis Nikolayevich Mashkarin
- Date of birth: 17 May 1973 (age 53)
- Place of birth: Leningrad, Russian SFSR
- Height: 1.84 m (6 ft 1/2 in)
- Positions: Defender; midfielder

Youth career
- Smena Leningrad

Senior career*
Years	Team	Apps	(Gls)
1990–1991	FC Dynamo St. Petersburg	12	(4)
1991	FC Zenit St. Petersburg	29	(0)
1992–1996	PFC CSKA Moscow	113	(8)
1997–1998	FC Torpedo Moscow	37	(1)
1999	FC Moskabelmet Moscow (amateur)		
2000–2002	FC Chernomorets Novorossiysk	53	(8)
2003–2004	FC Khimki	66	(4)
2005	FC Tobol	6	(0)
2005	FC Rotor Volgograd	12	(0)
2006	FC Khimki	0	(0)

International career
1992	USSR U-21	2	(0)
1992–1995	Russia U-21	19	(1)
- * Club domestic league appearances and goals

Denis Nikolayevich Mashkarin (Russian: Денис Николаевич Машкарин; born 17 May 1973) is a Russian former professional footballer.

He is most notable for scoring one of the goals in PFC CSKA Moscow's victory over FC Barcelona in the qualifying round of the 1992–93 UEFA Champions League. In retirement, he works for a company organising corporate events.

== Honours ==
- Soviet Cup finalist: 1992.
- Russian Cup finalist: 1993, 1994, 2005.
- Kazakhstan Premier League runner-up: 2005.

== European club competitions ==
- UEFA Champions League 1992–93 with PFC CSKA Moscow: 8 games, 1 goal.
- UEFA Cup Winners' Cup 1994–95 with PFC CSKA Moscow: 2 games.
- UEFA Cup 1996–97 with PFC CSKA Moscow: 4 goals.
- UEFA Intertoto Cup 1997 with FC Torpedo-Luzhniki Moscow: 5 games, 2 goals.
