= Vasili Ivanov =

Russian footballer and official

Vasili Ivanov Василий Ивано́в
Personal information
- Full name: Vasili Vladimirovich Ivanov
- Date of birth: 21 March 1970 (age 56)
- Place of birth: Leningrad, Soviet Union
- Height: 1.81 m (5 ft 11 in)
- Positions: Defender; midfielder

Senior career*
Years	Team	Apps	(Gls)
1987–1990	Zenit Leningrad	29	(0)
1990–1994	CSKA Moscow	76	(5)
1995–1999	Maccabi Herzliya	118	(10)
1999–2001	Maccabi Haifa	40	(2)
2002–2004	Chernomorets Novorossiysk	51	(0)
2005	Volgar-Gazprom Astrakhan	29	(0)
2006	Chernomorets Novorossiysk	17	(0)

Managerial career
- 2008–2012: Lokomotiv Moscow (scout)
- 2012–2014: Lokomotiv-2 Moscow (general director)
- 2015–2018: UOR #5 Yegoryevsk (director)
- 2018–2020: Khimki (general director)
- * Club domestic league appearances and goals

Vasili Vladimirovich Ivanov (Russian: Василий Владимирович Ивано́в; born 21 March 1970) is a Russian football official and a former player. He was widely regarded as one of the most influential foreign signings during his stint in Israel with Maccabi Haifa.

== Honours ==
- Soviet Top League champion: 1991.
- Soviet Top League runner-up: 1990.
- Soviet Cup winner: 1991.
- Soviet Cup finalist: 1990.
- Russian Cup finalist: 1993, 1994.

== European club competitions ==
- UEFA Cup 1989–90 with FC Zenit Leningrad: 3 games.
- UEFA Champions League 1992–93 with PFC CSKA Moscow: 7 games.
