= Lev Matveyev =

Russian footballer

Lev Matveyev Лев Матвеев
Personal information
- Full name: Lev Nikolayevich Matveyev
- Date of birth: 12 February 1971 (age 55)
- Place of birth: Ishimbay, Russian SFSR
- Height: 1.83 m (6 ft 0 in)
- Positions: Forward; midfielder

Youth career
- Vikhr Ishimbay

Senior career*
Years	Team	Apps	(Gls)
1988–1989	FC Gastello Ufa	59	(14)
1990–1991	FC Zvezda Perm	77	(20)
1991–1992	PFC CSKA Moscow	16	(1)
1993–1994	FC Zvezda Perm	73	(32)
1995–1996	Maccabi Ironi Ashdod	20	(-)
1996–1998	KAMAZ	74	(11)
1998–2000	FC Amkar Perm	60	(21)
2001	FC Dynamo Perm	21	(10)
2002	FC Stroitel Ufa	5	(0)
- * Club domestic league appearances and goals

Lev Nikolayevich Matveyev (Russian: Лев Николаевич Матвеев; born 12 February 1971) is a Russian former professional footballer.

== Club career ==
He made his professional debut in the Soviet Second League in 1988 for FC Gastello Ufa.

== Honours ==
- Soviet Top League champion: 1991.
- Soviet Cup finalist: 1992.
