= Sergei Krutov =

Russian footballer

Personal information
- Full name: Sergei Nikolayevich Krutov
- Date of birth: 18 April 1969 (age 57)
- Place of birth: Moscow, Russia
- Height: 1.82 m (5 ft 11 1/2 in)
- Positions: Midfielder; forward

Youth career
- PFC CSKA Moscow

Senior career*
Years	Team	Apps	(Gls)
1988	PFC CSKA-2 Moscow	25	(2)
1988–1989	PFC CSKA Moscow	41	(6)
1990	SBV Vitesse	0	(0)
1990	PFC CSKA Moscow	2	(0)
1991	SBV Vitesse	1	(0)
1992–1993	PFC CSKA Moscow	15	(3)
1993	FC Dynamo Moscow	22	(3)
1994–1995	FC Dynamo-Gazovik Tyumen	20	(1)
1996	FC Chernomorets Novorossiysk	5	(0)
1997–1998	FC Avtomobilist Noginsk	55	(13)
1999–2000	FC Metallurg Krasnoyarsk	13	(4)
2001	FC Lotto-MKM Moscow	16	(0)
2002	FC Rybinsk	12	(0)
- * Club domestic league appearances and goals

Sergei Nikolayevich Krutov (Russian: Серге́й Николаевич Крутов; born 18 April 1969) is a former Russian professional footballer.

== Club career ==
He made his professional debut in the Soviet Second League in 1988 for PFC CSKA-2 Moscow. He played 1 game in the UEFA Cup 1993–94 for FC Dynamo Moscow.

== Honours ==
- Soviet Top League runner-up: 1990.
- Russian Premier League bronze: 1993.
- Soviet Cup winner: 1991.
- Soviet Cup finalist: 1992.
- Russian Cup finalist: 1993.
