= Oleg Malyukov =

Russian footballer and coach

Oleg Malyukov Олег Малюков
Personal information
- Full name: Oleg Gennadyevich Malyukov
- Date of birth: October 30, 1965 (age 61)
- Place of birth: Dushanbe, Tajik SSR
- Height: 1.78 m (5 ft 10 in)
- Position: Defender

Youth career
- 1981–1982: Pamir Dushanbe

Senior career*
Years	Team	Apps	(Gls)
1983–1985	Pamir Dushanbe	72	(0)
1986–1993	CSKA Moscow	191	(2)
1993–1998	Ironi Rishon LeZion	114	(0)
1998	Torpedo Vladimir	13	(0)
1999	Slavia Mozyr	9	(0)

Managerial career
- 2001–2008: CSKA Moscow (coach)
- * Club domestic league appearances and goals

Oleg Gennadyevich Malyukov (Russian: Олег Геннадьевич Малюков; born October 30, 1965) is a Russian professional football coach and a former player. He played 8 games for PFC CSKA Moscow in the UEFA Champions League 1992–93. His son Oleg Olegovich Malyukov is also a professional footballer.

== Honours ==
- Soviet Top League champion: 1991.
- Soviet Top League runner-up: 1990.
- Soviet Cup winner: 1991.
- Soviet Cup finalist: 1992.
- Russian Cup finalist: 1993, 1994.
- Belarusian Premier League runner-up: 1999.
