= Aleksandr Grishin (footballer) =

Russian footballer (born 1971)

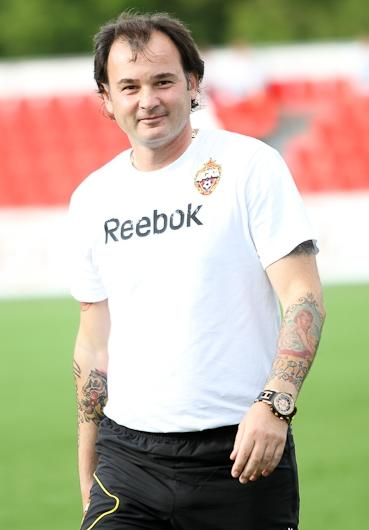
- Grishin working for CSKA in 2011

Personal information
- Full name: Aleksandr Sergeyevich Grishin
- Date of birth: 18 November 1971 (age 54)
- Place of birth: Moscow, Russian SFSR
- Height: 1.84 m (6 ft 1/2 in)
- Positions: Midfielder; defender

Team information
- Current team: FC Olimp-Dolgoprudny (assistant coach)

Youth career
- PFC CSKA Moscow

Senior career*
Years	Team	Apps	(Gls)
1988	PFC CSKA-2 Moscow	5	(3)
1988	FC Lokomotiv Moscow	0	(0)
1989	FC Chayka-CSKA Moscow	5	(0)
1989–1994	PFC CSKA Moscow	75	(14)
1995–1996	FC Dynamo Moscow	44	(3)
1997–1999	PFC CSKA Moscow	60	(1)
2000	FC Fakel Voronezh	23	(2)
2001	FC Shinnik Yaroslavl	24	(1)
2002	FC Rubin Kazan	13	(1)
2003	FC Salyut-Energia Belgorod	28	(0)
2004	FC Luch-Energiya Vladivostok	34	(0)
2005	FC Salyut-Energia Belgorod	32	(3)
2006	FC SKA Rostov-on-Don	25	(0)
Total		368	(28)

International career
1990	USSR U-19	3	(0)
1992	USSR U-21	2	(0)
1992–1994	Russia U-21	10	(3)

Managerial career
- 2009–2017: PFC CSKA Moscow (youth team)
- 2017–2018: Russia U-19
- 2018: FK Spartaks Jūrmala
- 2018–2019: FC SKA-Khabarovsk (assistant)
- 2019–2020: FC Kazanka Moscow (assistant)
- 2022–: FC Olimp-Dolgoprudny (assistant)
- * Club domestic league appearances and goals

Aleksandr Sergeyevich Grishin (Russian: Александр Серге́евич Гришин; born 18 November 1971) is a Russian professional football coach and a former player. He is assistant coach with FC Olimp-Dolgoprudny.

== Honours ==
- Soviet Top League champion: 1991.
- Soviet Top League runner-up: 1990.
- Russian Premier League runner-up: 1998.
- Russian Premier League bronze: 1999.
- Soviet Cup winner: 1991.
- Soviet Cup runner-up: 1992.
- Russian Cup finalist: 1993, 1994, 1997.

== European club competitions ==
- UEFA Champions League 1992–93 with PFC CSKA Moscow: 7 games, 2 goals.
- UEFA Cup Winners' Cup 1995–96 with FC Dynamo Moscow: 6 games.
- UEFA Cup 1996–97 with FC Dynamo Moscow: 4 games.
