= Ilshat Fayzulin =

Russian footballer

Personal information
- Full name: Ilshat Galimzyanovich Fayzulin
- Date of birth: 5 March 1973 (age 53)
- Place of birth: Osinniki, Soviet Union
- Height: 1.76 m (5 ft 9 in)
- Position: Forward

Team information
- Current team: Dynamo Makhachkala (assistant coach)

Senior career*
Years	Team	Apps	(Gls)
1989–1995	CSKA Moscow	103	(25)
1995–1997	Racing Santander	54	(8)
1997–1998	Villarreal	22	(1)
1998–1999	Alverca	10	(0)
1999	Farense	6	(0)
2000	Altay	5	(0)
2000–2001	Getafe	33	(6)
2002	Dynamo Saint Petersburg	16	(4)
2002	Metallurg Lipetsk	14	(2)
2002–2003	Bezana		
2004	Vidnoye	10	(5)
2004	Crevillente		
2005	Redován		
2005–2006	Gimnástica	33	(4)
2006–2007	Ribamontán		

International career
1992	USSR U-21	4	(0)
1992–1995	Russia U-21	19	(5)
1993	Russia	1	(0)

Managerial career
- 2018–2019: Banants (caretaker)
- 2019: Urartu
- 2019–2021: Kazanka Moscow
- 2024–2025: Leningradets (assistant)
- 2025: Chernomorets Novorossiysk (assistant)
- 2026–: Dynamo Makhachkala (assistant)
- * Club domestic league appearances and goals

Ilshat Galimzyanovich Fayzulin (Russian: Ильшат Галимзянович Файзулин; Tatar: Илшат Галимҗан улы Фәйзуллин; born 5 March 1973) is a Russian football coach and a former player of Tatar ethnic origin who is an assistant manager with Dynamo Makhachkala.

A forward, his career was majorly spent in equal periods of time in Russia and Spain.

== Club career ==
Born in Osinniki, Soviet Union, Fayzulin started playing professionally with PFC CSKA Moscow, where his performances garnered the attention of Spain's Racing de Santander (later, during one season, he would team up with compatriot Dmitri Popov at the La Liga side). Subsequently, he was a relatively important offensive element at Villarreal CF, helping the club achieve a first-ever top flight promotion in 1998.

After two unassuming spells in Portugal, Fayzulin finished 1999–2000 in Turkey with Altay SK, then returned to Spain and its second division with Getafe CF, not being able to prevent the Madrid team's eventual relegation.

Fayzulin then returned to his country, playing with four modest sides, and retired in Spain in 2007 after three years in the lower leagues.

== International career ==
Fayzulin played one game for Russia, featuring 26 minutes in a 1–3 friendly loss against France on 28 July 1993.

== Managerial career ==
On 11 August 2018, Fayzulin was appointed caretaker manager of Banants. On 24 November 2019, Fayzulin resigned as manager of Urartu.

== Honours ==
=== Club ===
- Soviet League: 1991

=== Individual ===
- Top 33 players year-end list: 1992, 1993
