= Mikhail Kolesnikov (footballer) =

Russian footballer

Personal information
- Full name: Mikhail Viktorovich Kolesnikov
- Date of birth: 8 September 1966 (age 60)
- Place of birth: Moscow, Russia
- Height: 1.77 m (5 ft 9 1/2 in)
- Positions: Midfielder; forward

Youth career
- PFC CSKA Moscow

Senior career*
Years	Team	Apps	(Gls)
1983–1993	PFC CSKA Moscow	244	(28)
1994	FC Spartak Moscow	0	(0)
1994	PFC CSKA Moscow	0	(0)
- * Club domestic league appearances and goals

Mikhail Viktorovich Kolesnikov (Russian: Михаил Викторович Колесников; born 8 September 1966) is a former Russian professional footballer.

== Honours ==
- Soviet Top League champion: 1991.
- Soviet Top League runner-up: 1990.
- Soviet Cup winner: 1991.
- Soviet Cup finalist: 1992.
- Russian Cup finalist: 1993.

== European club competitions ==
With PFC CSKA Moscow.

- UEFA Cup Winners' Cup 1991–92: 2 goals.
- UEFA Champions League 1992–93: 3 games, 1 goal.
