= FC Okean Nakhodka =

Okean
- Full name: FC Okean Nakhodka
- Founded: 1986
- Dissolved: 2015
- Ground: Vodnik stadium
- Capacity: 10,000
- Manager: Aleksandr Tikhonovetsky
- League: Amateur Football League Primorsky Kray
- 2011–12: Amateur Football League, Prmorsky Kray, 4th
Home colours	Away colours

Okean Nakhodka was a Russian football club based in Nakhodka, Primorsky Krai. The club's colours were white and blue.

== History ==
In 1989 Okean won the RSFSR Cup, and in 1991 they won the regional league.

Okean spent 1992 and 1993 seasons in the Top League, being one of the founding members, aided by the fact that the clubs from other Soviet republics walked away from the existing Soviet league system to form their own leagues. They thus became the easternmost club to compete in the Top League (and by extension, all of Europe's top flight leagues, though they never made any European competition), a record they hold until 2017 (when SKA-Khabarovsk won promotion to the top tier of Russian football). The best result they achieved was a 14th position in 1992.

After relegation in 1993 Okean played in the First League in 1994–1996, after which they were relegated again.

Okean played in the Second Division after 1997. The best result was achieved in 2005, when they finished as runners-up. In 2010 they finished 11th or last in East Zone of Second Division and were relegated to the Amateur Football League for 2011, losing professional status.

The club was liquidated in 2015.

=== Phoenix Club ===
The club was reformed in 2018 and competed in the Primorsky Kray championship during 2019, winning this competition and being promoted to the Russian Amateur Football League (level 3) - Far Eastern Championship for the 2021 season

== Notable persons and matches ==
Oleg Garin is considered the best footballer in club's history.

One of the club's best matches was played on 30 July 1992, when Okean defeated CSKA at home 5–2. The last defending Soviet champions lost to the debutants of the Top League.

== Reserve squad ==
Okean's reserve squad played professionally as FC Okean-d Nakhodka in the Russian Second League in 1993.

== Notable past players ==
Had international caps for their respective countries. Players whose name is listed in bold represented their countries while playing for Okean.

- (Azerbaijan) Sergey Sokolov
- (Kazakhstan) Konstantin Ledovskikh
- (Russia) Viktor Fayzulin
- (Turkmenistan) **Rifäd Timraliýew**
- (Uzbekistan) Sergey Lushan
- (Uzbekistan) Andrei Rezantsev
