= List of people from Voronezh =

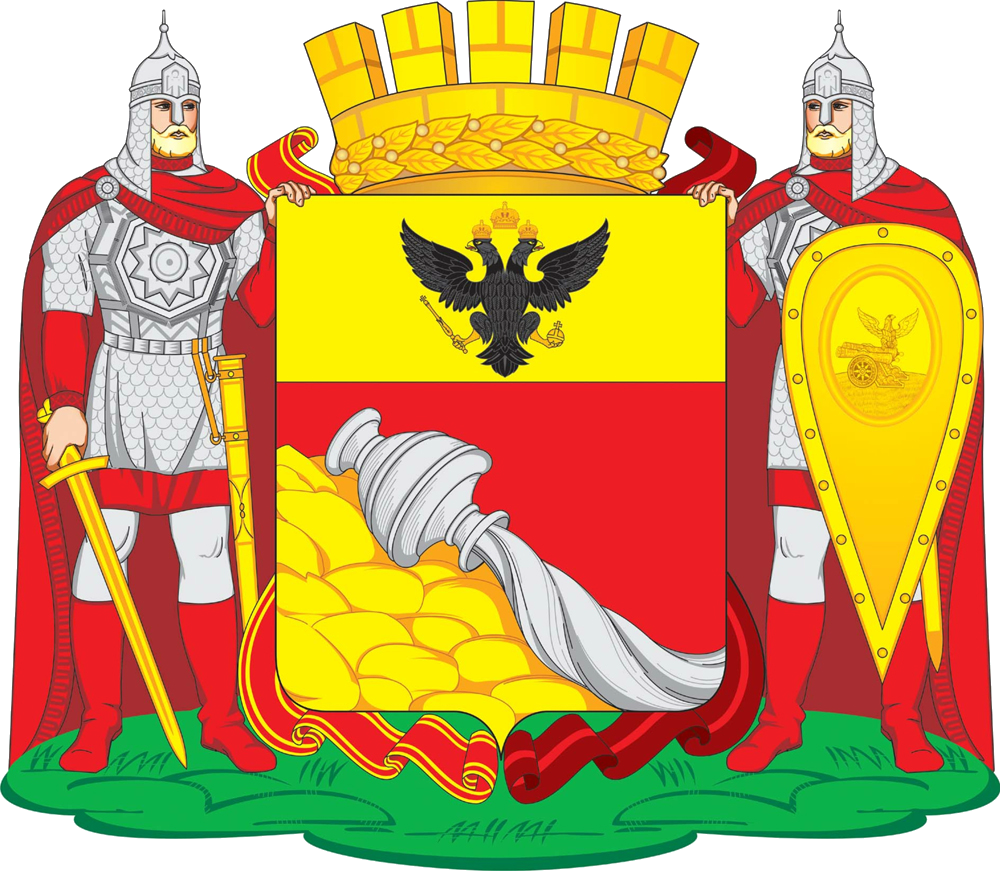
Coat of Arms of Voronezh

This is a list of notable people who were born or have lived in Voronezh, Russia.

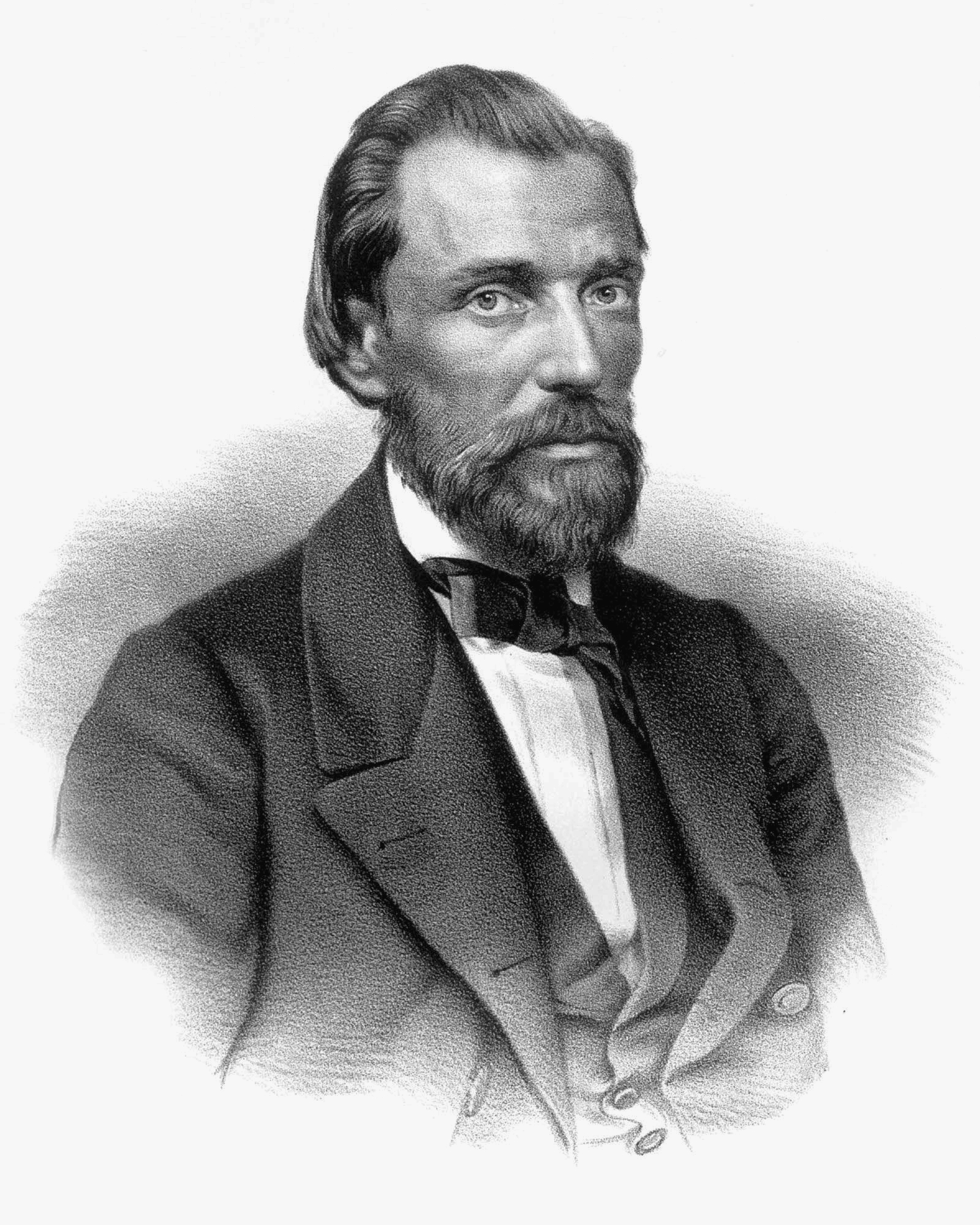
Ivan Nikitin (1824–1861)

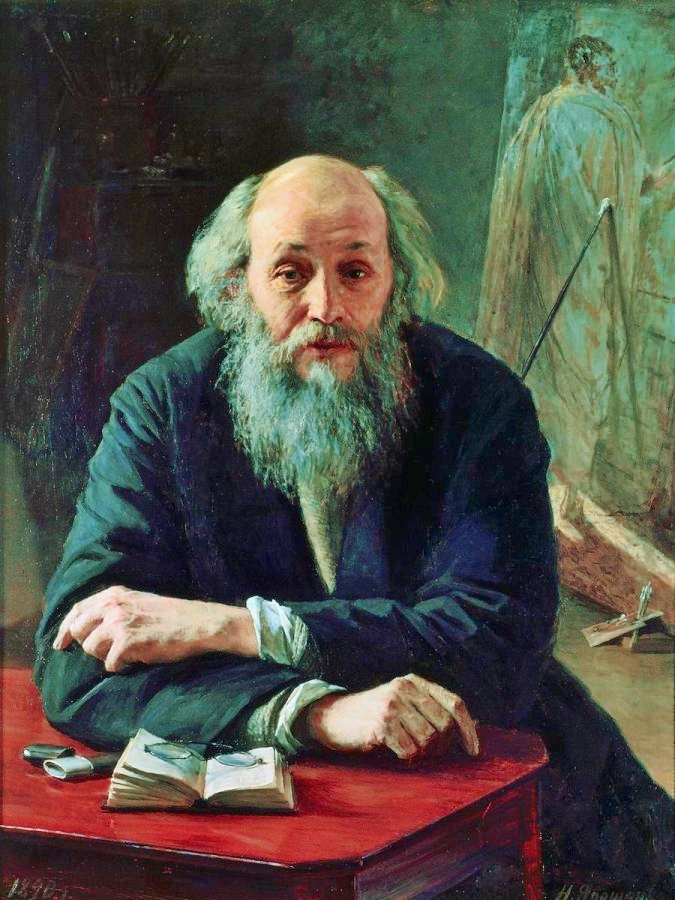
Nikolai Ge (1831–1894)

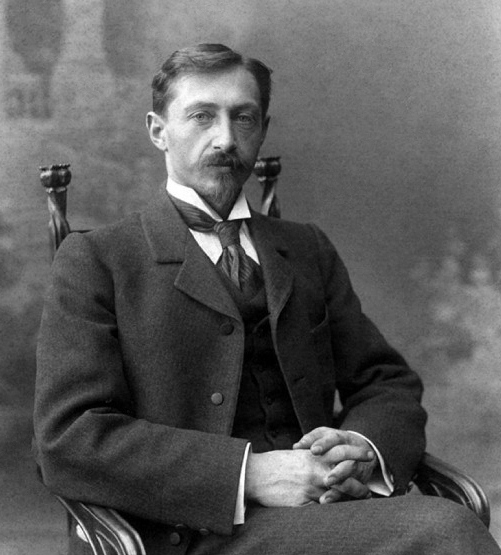
Ivan Bunin (1870–1953)

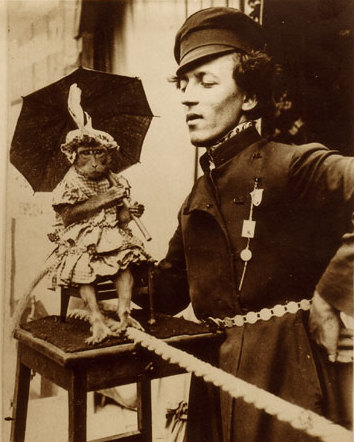
Anatoly Durov (1887–1928)

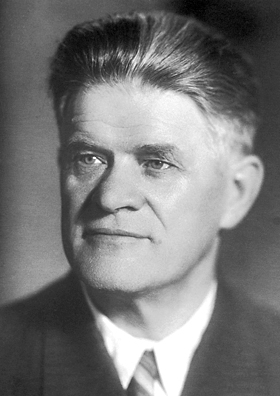
Pavel Cherenkov (1904–1990)

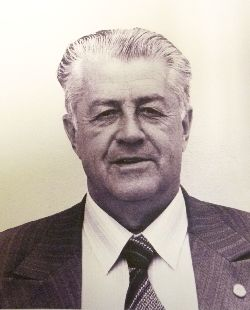
Vladimir Zagorovsky (1925–1994)

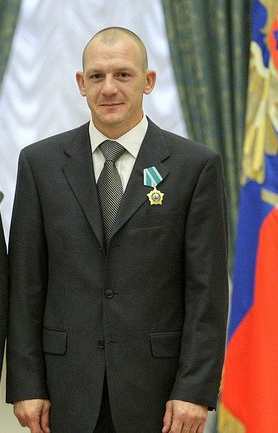
Dmitri Sautin (born 1974)

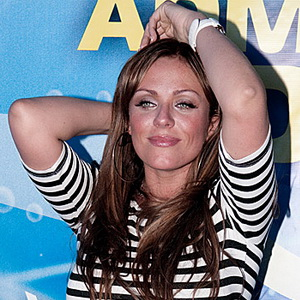
Yulia Nachalova (1981–2019)

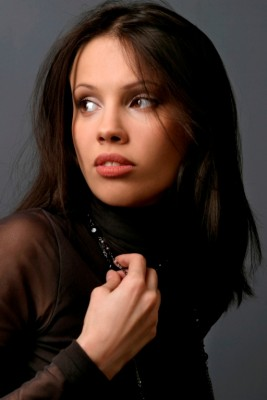
Yevgeniya Serebrennikova (born 1982)

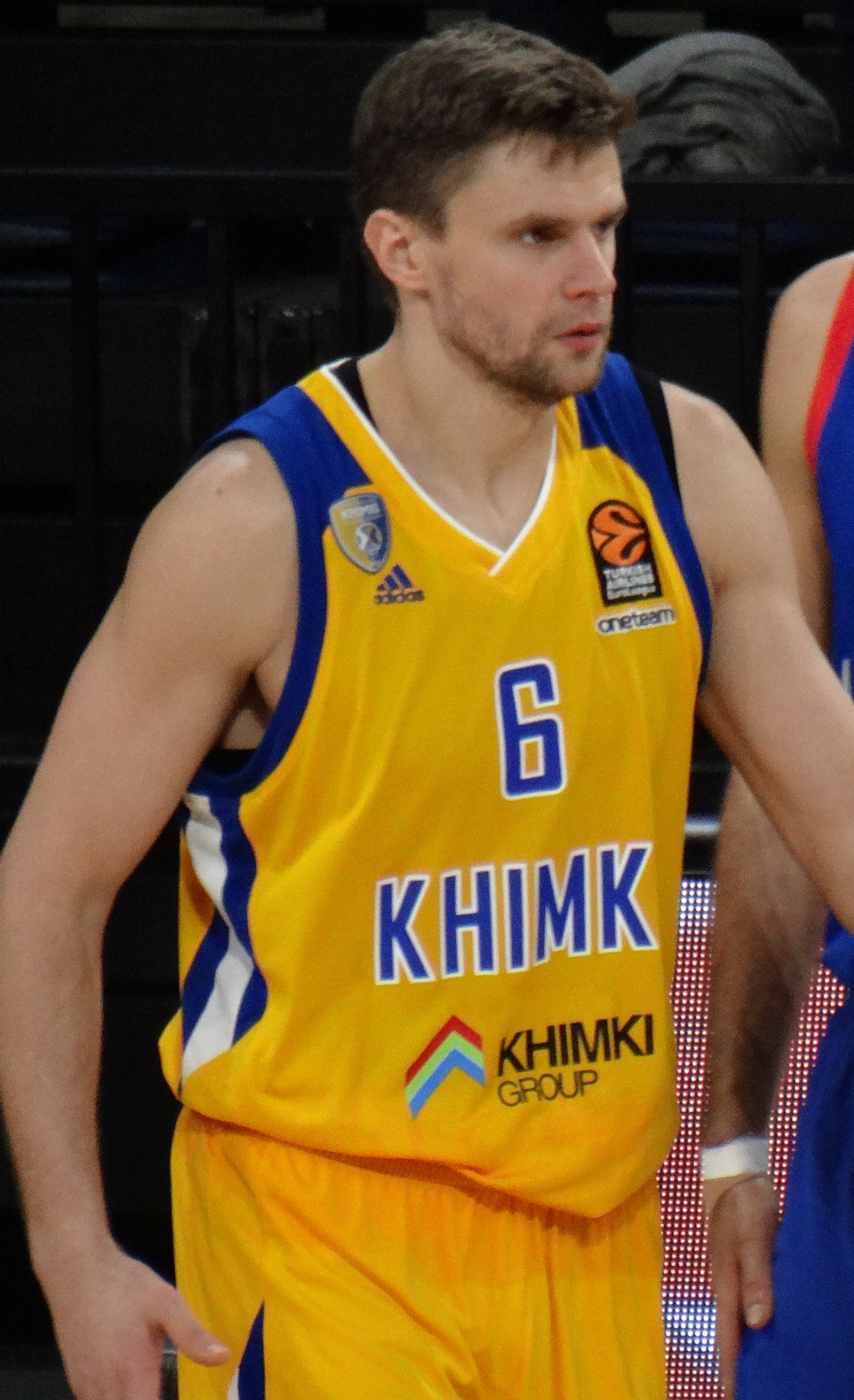
Egor Vyaltsev (born 1985)

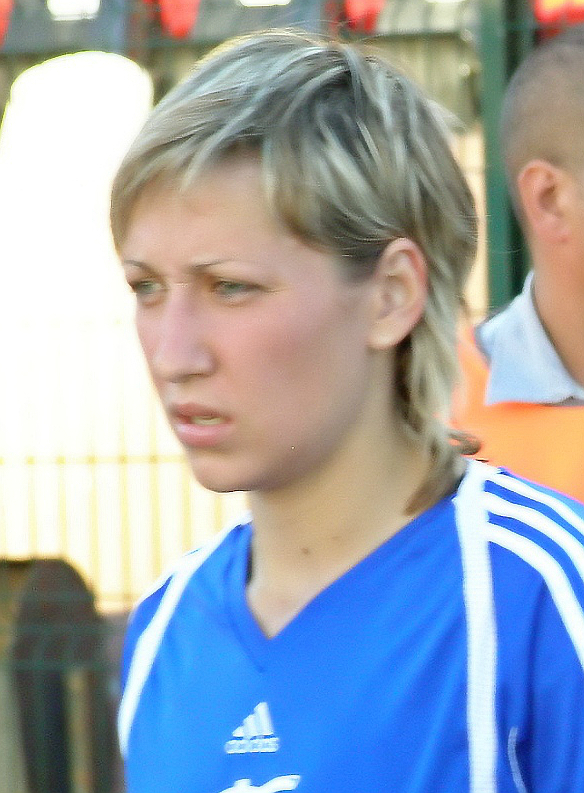
Elena Danilova (born 1987)

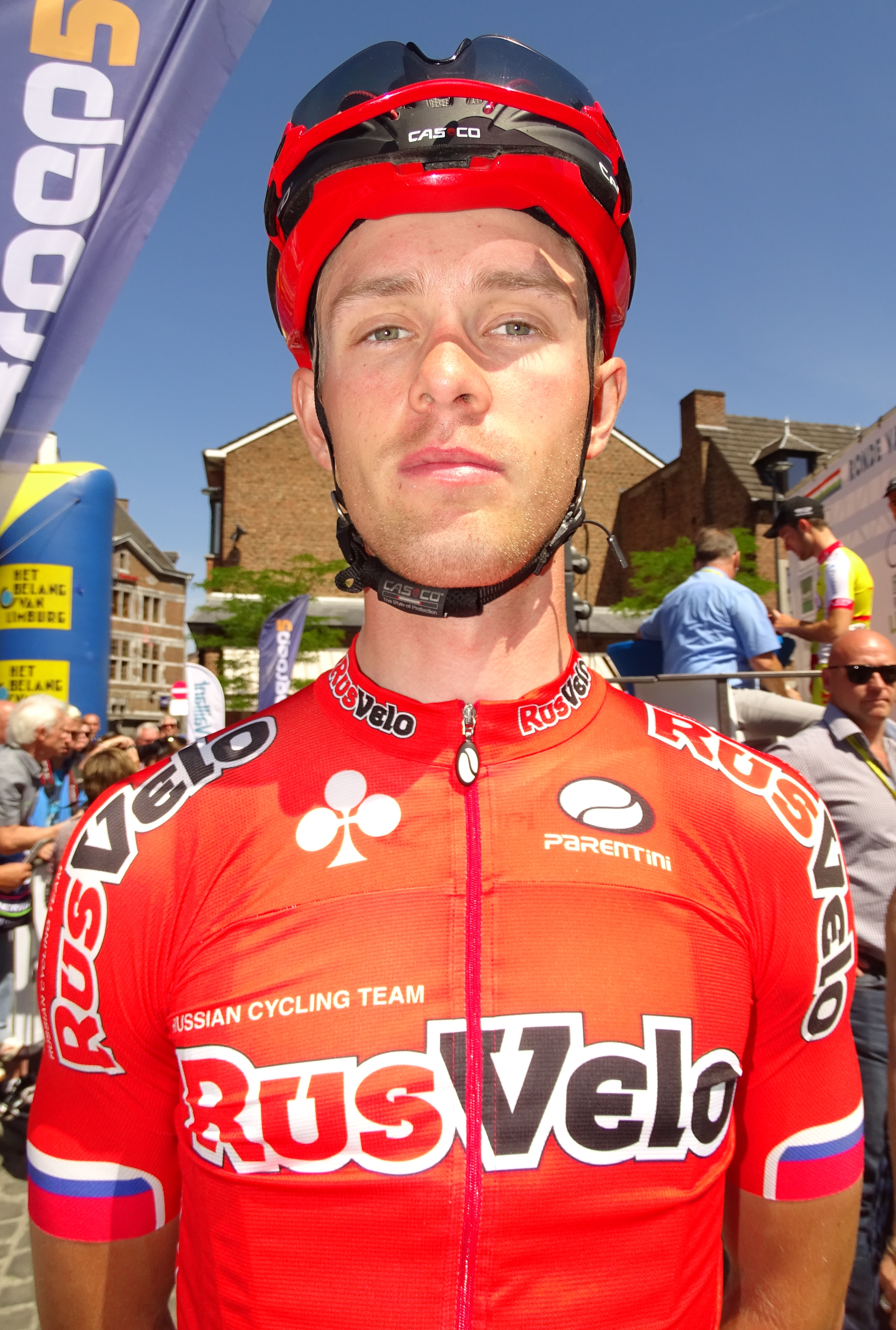
Igor Boev (born 1989)

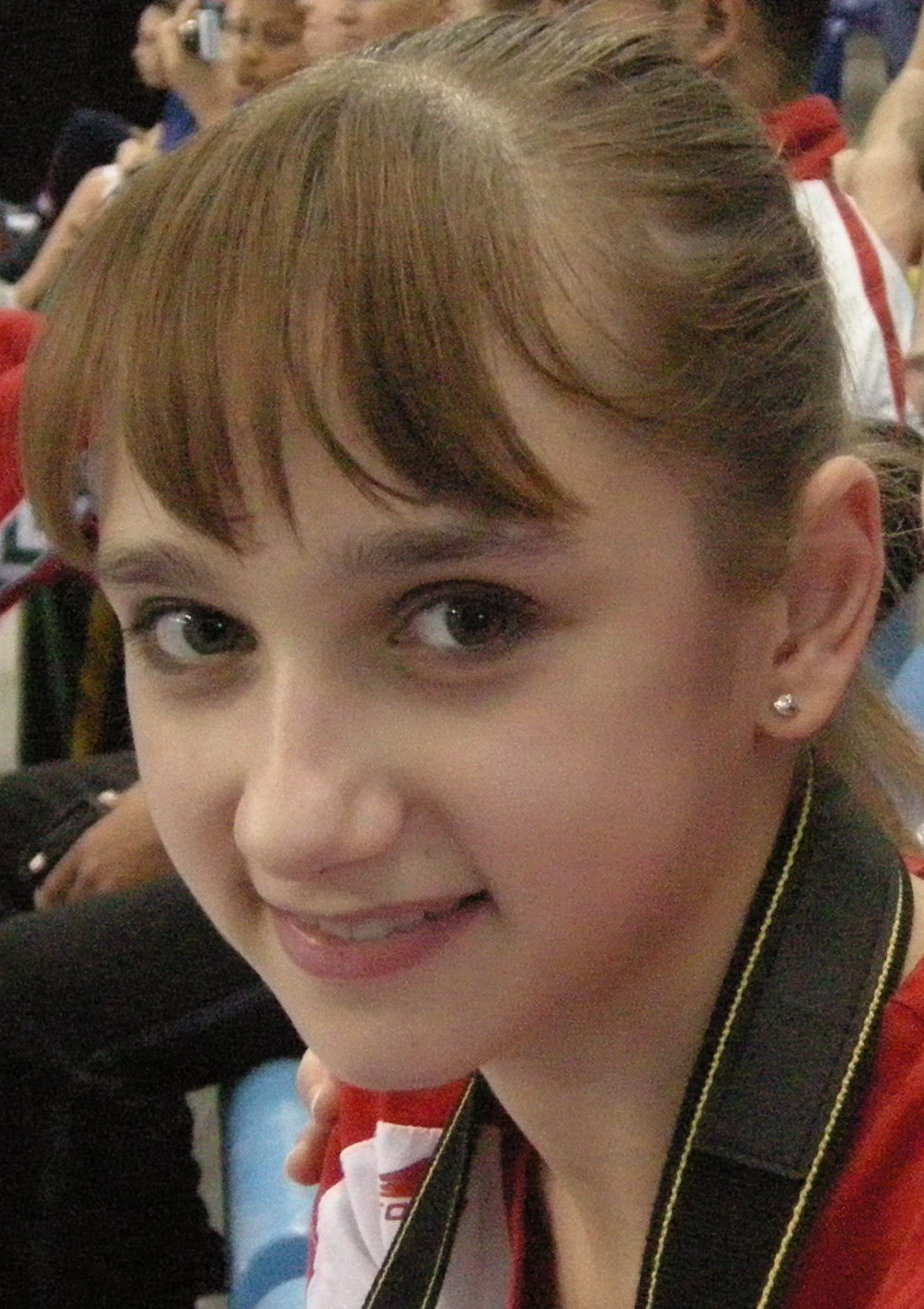
Viktoria Komova (born 1995)

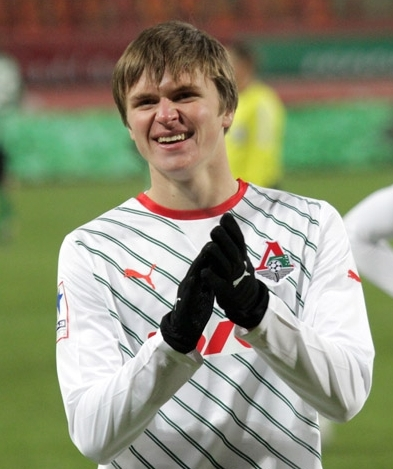
Vitali Lystsov (born 1995)

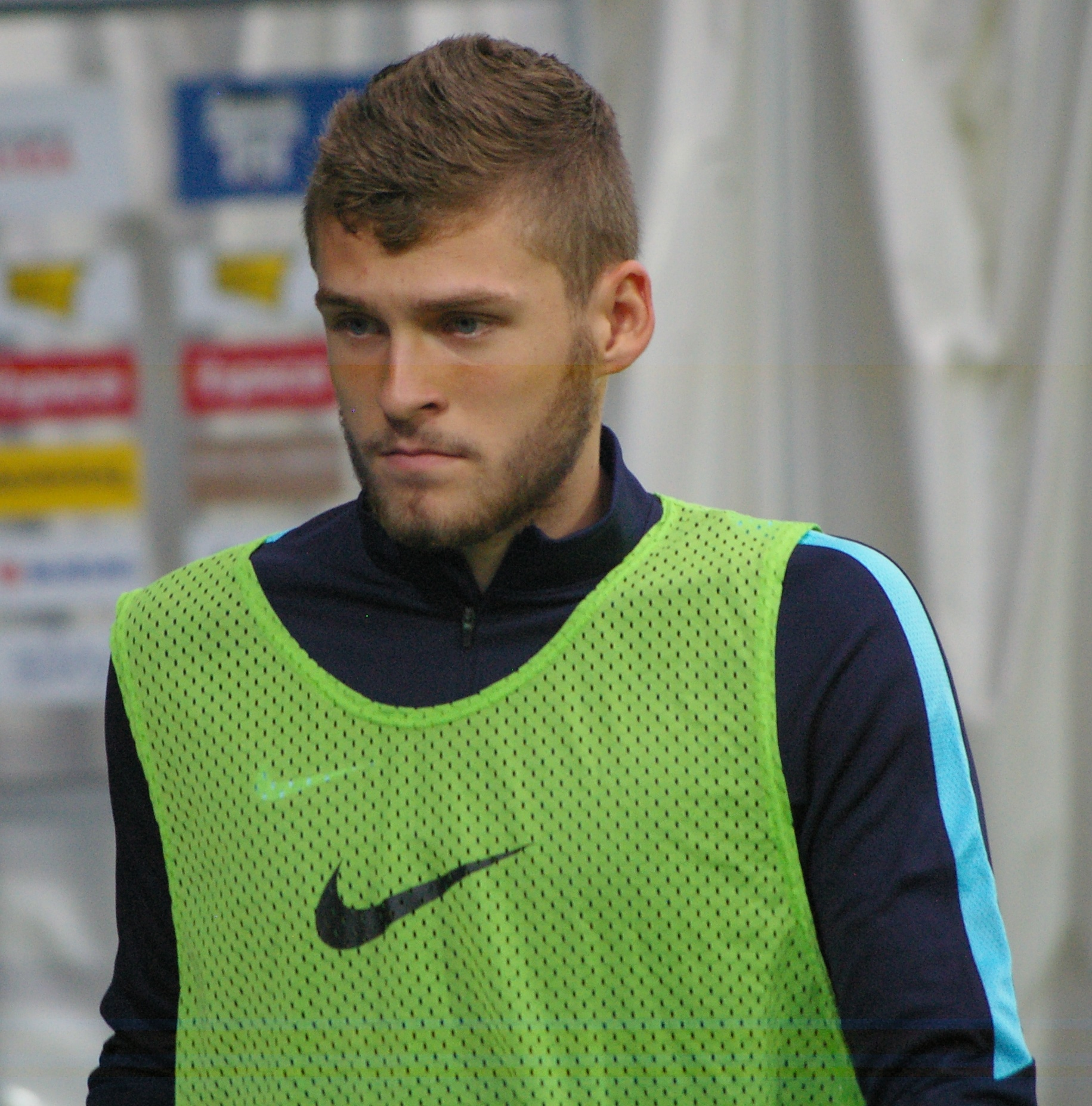
Dmitri Skopintsev (born 1997)

== Born in Voronezh ==
=== 18th century ===
- Yevgeny Bolkhovitinov (1767–1837), Orthodox Metropolitan of Kiev and Galicia
- Mikhail Pavlov (1792–1840), Russian academic and professor at Moscow University

=== 19th century ===
==== 1801–1850 ====
- Aleksey Koltsov (1809–1842), Russian poet
- Ivan Nikitin (1824–1861), Russian poet
- Nikolai Ge (1831–1894), Russian realist painter famous for his works on historical and religious motifs
- Vasily Sleptsov (1836–1878), Russian writer and social reformer
- Nikolay Kashkin (1839–1920), Russian music critic

==== 1851–1900 ====
- Valentin Zhukovsky (1858–1918), Russian orientalist
- Vasily Goncharov (1861–1915), Russian film director and screenwriter, one of the pioneers of the film industry in the Russian Empire
- Anastasiya Verbitskaya (1861–1928), Russian novelist, playwright, screenplay writer, publisher and feminist
- Mikhail Olminsky (1863–1933), Russian Communist
- Serge Voronoff (1866–1951), French surgeon of Russian origin
- Andrei Shingarev (1869–1918), Russian doctor, publicist and politician
- Ivan Bunin (1870–1953), the first Russian writer to win the Nobel Prize for Literature
- Alexander Ostuzhev (1874–1953), Russian and Soviet drama actor
- Valerian Albanov (1881–1919), Russian navigator and polar explorer
- Jan Hambourg (1882–1947), Russian violinist, a member of a famous musical family
- Volin (1882–1945), anarchist
- Boris Hambourg (1885–1954), Russian cellist who made his career in the USA, Canada, England and Europe
- Boris Eikhenbaum (1886–1959), Russian and Soviet literary scholar, and historian of Russian literature
- Anatoly Durov (1887–1928), Russian animal trainer
- Samuil Marshak (1887–1964), Russian and Soviet writer, translator and children's poet
- Eduard Shpolsky (1892–1975), Russian and Soviet physicist and educator
- George of Syracuse (1893–1981), Eastern Orthodox archbishop of the Ecumenical Patriarchate
- Yevgeny Gabrilovich (1899–1993), Soviet screenwriter
- Semyon Krivoshein (1899–1978), Soviet tank commander; Lieutenant General
- Andrei Platonov (1899–1951), Soviet Russian writer, playwright and poet
- Ivan Pravov (1899–1971), Russian and Soviet film director and screenwriter
- William Dameshek (1900–1969), American hematologist

=== 20th century ===
==== 1901–1930 ====
- Ivan Nikolaev (1901–1979), Soviet architect and educator
- Galina Shubina (1902–1980), Russian poster and graphics artist
- Pavel Cherenkov (1904–1990), Soviet physicist who shared the Nobel Prize in physics in 1958 with Ilya Frank and Igor Tamm for the discovery of Cherenkov radiation, made in 1934
- Yakov Kreizer (1905–1969), Soviet field commander, General of the army and Hero of the Soviet Union
- Iosif Rudakovsky (1914–1947), Soviet chess master
- Pawel Kassatkin (1915–1987), Russian writer
- Alexander Shelepin (1918–1994), Soviet state security officer and party statesman
- Grigory Baklanov (1923–2009), Russian writer
- Gleb Strizhenov (1923–1985), Soviet actor
- Vladimir Zagorovsky (1925–1994), Russian chess grandmaster of correspondence chess and the fourth ICCF World Champion between 1962 and 1965
- Konstantin Feoktistov (1926–2009), cosmonaut and engineer
- Vitaly Vorotnikov (1926–2012), Soviet statesman
- Arkady Davidowitz (1930–2021), writer and aphorist

==== 1931–1950 ====
- Grigory Sanakoev (1935–2021), Russian International Correspondence Chess Grandmaster, most famous for being the twelfth ICCF World Champion (1984–1991)
- Yuri Zhuravlyov (1935–2022), Russian mathematician
- Mykola Koltsov (1936–2011), Soviet footballer and Ukrainian football children and youth trainer
- Vyacheslav Ovchinnikov (1936–2019), Russian composer
- Iya Savvina (1936–2011), Soviet film actress
- Tamara Zamotaylova (1939), Soviet gymnast, who won four Olympic medals at the 1960 and 1964 Summer Olympics
- Yury Smolyakov (1941), Soviet Olympic fencer
- Yevgeny Lapinsky (1942–1999), Soviet Olympic volleyball player
- Galina Bukharina (1945), Soviet athlete
- Vladimir Patkin (1945), Soviet Olympic volleyball player
- Vladimir Proskurin (1945), Soviet Russian football player and coach
- Aleksandr Maleyev (1947), Soviet artistic gymnast
- Valeri Nenenko (1950), Russian professional football coach and player

==== 1951–1970 ====
- Vladimir Rokhlin Jr. (1952), Russian-American mathematician and professor of computer science and mathematics at the Yale University
- Lyubov Burda (1953), Russian artistic gymnast
- Mikhail Khryukin (1955), Russian swimmer
- Aleksandr Tkachyov (1957), Russian gymnast and two times Olympic Champion
- Nikolai Vasilyev (1957), Russian professional football coach and player
- Aleksandr Babanov (1958), Russian professional football coach and player
- Sergey Koliukh (1960), Russian political figure; 4th Mayor of Voronezh
- Yelena Davydova (1961), Soviet gymnast
- Aleksandr Borodyuk (1962), Russian football manager and former international player for USSR and Russia
- Aleksandr Chayev (1962), Russian swimmer
- Elena Fanailova (1962), Russian poet
- Alexander Litvinenko (1962–2006), officer of the Russian FSB and political dissident
- Yuri Shishkin (1963), Russian professional football coach and player
- Yuri Klinskikh (1964–2000), Russian musician, singer, songwriter, arranger, founder rock band Sektor Gaza
- Yelena Ruzina (1964), athlete
- Igor Bragin (1965), footballer
- Gennadi Remezov (1965), Russian professional footballer
- Valeri Shmarov (1965), Russian football player and coach
- Konstantin Chernyshov (1967), Russian chess grandmaster
- Igor Pyvin (1967), Russian professional football coach and player
- Vladimir Bobrezhov (1968), Soviet sprint canoer

==== 1971–1980 ====
- Oleg Gorobiy (1971), Russian sprint canoer
- Anatoli Kanishchev (1971), Russian professional association footballer
- Ruslan Mashchenko (1971), Russian hurdler
- Aleksandr Ovsyannikov (1974), Russian professional footballer
- Dmitri Sautin (1974), Russian diver who has won more medals than any other Olympic diver
- Sergey Verlin (1974), Russian sprint canoer
- Maxim Narozhnyy (1975–2011), Paralympian athlete
- Aleksandr Cherkes (1976), Russian football coach and player
- Andrei Durov (1977), Russian professional footballer
- Nikolai Kryukov (1978), Russian artistic gymnast
- Kirill Gerstein (1979), Jewish American and Russian pianist
- Evgeny Ignatov (1979), Russian sprint canoeist
- Aleksey Nikolaev (1979), Russian-Uzbekistan footballer
- Aleksandr Palchikov (1979), former Russian professional football player
- Konstantin Skrylnikov (1979), Russian professional footballer
- Aleksandr Varlamov (1979), Russian diver
- Angelina Yushkova (1979), Russian gymnast
- Maksim Potapov (1980), professional ice hockey player

==== 1981–1990 ====
- Alexander Krysanov (1981), Russian professional ice hockey forward
- Yulia Nachalova (1981–2019), Soviet and Russian singer, actress and television presenter
- Andrei Ryabykh (1982), Russian football player
- Maxim Shchyogolev (1982), Russian theatre and film actor
- Eduard Vorganov (1982), Russian professional road bicycle racer
- Anton Buslov (1983–2014), Russian astrophysicist, blogger, columnist at The New Times magazine and expert on transportation systems
- Dmitri Grachyov (1983), Russian footballer
- Aleksandr Kokorev (1984), Russian professional football player
- Dmitry Kozonchuk (1984), Russian professional road bicycle racer for Team Katusha
- Alexander Khatuntsev (1985), Russian professional road bicycle racer
- Egor Vyaltsev (1985), Russian professional basketball player
- Samvel Aslanyan (1986), Russian handball player
- Maksim Chistyakov (1986), Russian football player
- Yevgeniy Dorokhin (1986), Russian sprint canoer
- Daniil Gridnev (1986), Russian professional footballer
- Vladimir Moskalyov (1986), Russian football referee
- Elena Danilova (1987), Russian football forward
- Sektor Gaza (1987–2000), punk band
- Regina Moroz (1987), Russian female volleyball player
- Roman Shishkin (1987), Russian footballer
- Viktor Stroyev (1987), Russian footballer
- Elena Terekhova (1987), Russian international footballer
- Natalia Goncharova (1988), Russian diver
- Yelena Yudina (1988), Russian skeleton racer
- Dmitry Abakumov (1989), Russian professional association football player
- Igor Boev (1989), Russian professional racing cyclist
- Ivan Dobronravov (1989), Russian actor
- Anna Bogomazova (1990), Russian kickboxer, martial artist, professional wrestler and valet
- Yuriy Kunakov (1990), Russian diver
- Vitaly Melnikov (1990), Russian backstroke swimmer
- Vladislav Ryzhkov (1990), Russian footballer

==== 1991–2000 ====
- Danila Poperechny (1994), Russian stand-up comedian, actor, youtuber, podcaster
- Darya Stukalova (1994), Russian Paralympic swimmer
- Viktoria Komova (1995), Russian Olympic gymnast
- Vitali Lystsov (1995), Russian professional footballer
- Marina Nekrasova (1995), Russian-born Azerbaijani artistic gymnast
- Vladislav Parshikov (1996), Russian football player
- Dmitri Skopintsev (1997), Russian footballer
- Angelina Melnikova (2000), Russian Olympic gymnast

== Lived in Voronezh ==
- Aleksey Khovansky (1814–1899), editor
- Ivan Kramskoi (1837–1887), Russian painter and art critic
- Mitrofan Pyatnitsky (1864–1927), Russian musician
- Mikhail Tsvet (1872–1919), Russian botanist
- Alexander Kuprin (1880–1960), Russian painter, a member of the Jack of Diamonds group
- Yevgeny Zamyatin (1884-1937), Russian writer, went to school in Voronezh
- Osip Mandelstam (1891–1938), Russian poet
- Nadezhda Mandelstam (1899-1980), Russian writer
- Gavriil Troyepolsky (1905–1995), Soviet writer
- Nikolay Basov (1922–2001), Soviet physicist and educator
- Vasily Peskov (1930–2013), Russian writer, journalist, photographer, traveller and ecologist
- Valentina Popova (1972), Russian weightlifter
- Igor Samsonov, painter
- Tatyana Zrazhevskaya, Russian boxer

== See also ==
- List of Russians
- List of Russian-language poets
