= Shestikurganny =

Shestikurganny Шестикурганный
- Khutor
- Location within Voronezh Oblast Location within Russia
- Coordinates: 51°04′N 40°23′E
- Country: Russia
- Region: Voronezh Oblast
- District: Bobrovsky District
- Time zone: UTC+3:00

Shestikurganny (Russian: Шестикурганный) is a rural locality (a khutor) in Oktyabrvskoye Rural Settlement, Bobrovsky District, Voronezh Oblast, Russia. The population was 158 as of 2010.

== Geography ==
Shestikurganny is located 37 km east of Bobrov (the district's administrative centre) by road. Nikolskoye is the nearest rural locality.
