= Nezhdanovka =

Nezhdanovka Неждановка
- Settlement
- Location within Voronezh Oblast Location within Russia
- Coordinates: 51°01′N 39°58′E
- Country: Russia
- Region: Voronezh Oblast
- District: Bobrovsky District
- Time zone: UTC+3:00

Nezhdanovka (Russian: Неждановка) is a rural locality (a settlement) in Yasenkovskoye Rural Settlement, Bobrovsky District, Voronezh Oblast, Russia. The population was 74 as of 2010.

== Geography ==
Nezhdanovka is located 11 km southwest of Bobrov (the district's administrative centre) by road. Nikolo-Varvarinka is the nearest rural locality.
