= Kopanya =

Kopanya Копаня
- Settlement
- Location within Voronezh Oblast Location within Russia
- Coordinates: 51°02′N 39°56′E
- Country: Russia
- Region: Voronezh Oblast
- District: Bobrovsky District
- Time zone: UTC+3:00

Kopanya (Russian: Копаня) is a rural locality (a settlement) in Yasenkovskoye Rural Settlement, Bobrovsky District, Voronezh Oblast, Russia. The population was 75 as of 2010.

== Geography ==
Kopanya is located 10 km southwest of Bobrov (the district's administrative centre) by road. Yasenki is the nearest rural locality.
