= Nikolo-Varvarinka =

Nikolo-Varvarinka Николо-Варваринка
- Selo
- Location within Voronezh Oblast Location within Russia
- Coordinates: 51°00′N 39°58′E
- Country: Russia
- Region: Voronezh Oblast
- District: Bobrovsky District
- Time zone: UTC+3:00

Nikolo-Varvarinka (Russian: Николо-Варваринка) is a rural locality (a selo) in Pchelinovskoye Rural Settlement, Bobrovsky District, Voronezh Oblast, Russia. The population was 956 as of 2010. There are 7 streets.

== Geography ==
Nikolo-Varvarinka is located 13 km south of Bobrov (the district's administrative centre) by road. Yasenki is the nearest rural locality.
