= Shishovka, Voronezh Oblast =

Shishovka Шишовка
- Selo
- Location within Voronezh Oblast Location within Russia
- Coordinates: 51°14′N 40°11′E
- Country: Russia
- Region: Voronezh Oblast
- District: Bobrovsky District
- Time zone: UTC+3:00

Shishovka (Russian: Шишовка) is a rural locality (a selo) and the administrative center of Shishovskoye Rural Settlement, Bobrovsky District, Voronezh Oblast, Russia. In ХІХ century the village was part of Chesmenskaya volost, Bobrovsky Uyezd, Voronezh Governorate. The population was 1,186 as of 2010. There are 13 streets.

== Geography ==
Shishovka is located 22 km northeast of Bobrov (the district's administrative centre) by road. Chesmenka is the nearest rural locality.
