= Korshevo =

Korshevo Коршево
- Selo
- Location within Voronezh Oblast Location within Russia
- Coordinates: 51°11′N 40°06′E
- Country: Russia
- Region: Voronezh Oblast
- District: Bobrovsky District
- Time zone: UTC+3:00

Korshevo (Russian: Коршево) is a rural locality (a selo) and the administrative center of Korshevskoye Rural Settlement, Bobrovsky District, Voronezh Oblast, Russia. The population was 2,004 as of 2010. There are 16 streets.

== Geography ==
Korshevo is located 17 km northeast of Bobrov (the district's administrative centre) by road. Shishovka is the nearest rural locality.
