= Petrovo-Borkovsky =

Petrovo-Borkovsky Петрово-Борковский
- Settlement
- Location within Voronezh Oblast Location within Russia
- Coordinates: 51°01′N 39°55′E
- Country: Russia
- Region: Voronezh Oblast
- District: Bobrovsky District
- Time zone: UTC+3:00

Petrovo-Borkovsky (Russian: Петрово-Борковский) is a rural locality (a settlement) in Yasenkovskoye Rural Settlement, Bobrovsky District, Voronezh Oblast, Russia. The population was 124 as of 2010.

== Geography ==
Petrovo-Borkovsky is located 13 km southwest of Bobrov (the district's administrative centre) by road. Yasenki is the nearest rural locality.
