= Novy Buravl =

Novy Buravl Новый Буравль
- Selo
- Location within Voronezh Oblast Location within Russia
- Coordinates: 50°57′N 40°12′E
- Country: Russia
- Region: Voronezh Oblast
- District: Bobrovsky District
- Time zone: UTC+3:00

Novy Buravl (Russian: Новый Буравль) is a rural locality (a selo) in Oktyabrvskoye Rural Settlement, Bobrovsky District, Voronezh Oblast, Russia. The population was 87 as of 2010.

== Geography ==
Novy Buravl is located 30 km southeast of Bobrov (the district's administrative centre) by road. Semyono-Aleksandrovka is the nearest rural locality.
