= Pogromok =

Pogromok Погромок
- Settlement
- Location within Voronezh Oblast Location within Russia
- Coordinates: 51°15′N 39°49′E
- Country: Russia
- Region: Voronezh Oblast
- District: Bobrovsky District
- Time zone: UTC+3:00

Pogromok (Russian: Погромок) is a rural locality (a settlement) in Yudanovskoye Rural Settlement, Bobrovsky District, Voronezh Oblast, Russia. The population was 73 as of 2010.

== Geography ==
Pogromok is located 31 km northwest of Bobrov (the district's administrative centre) by road. Yudanovka is the nearest rural locality.
