= Shkarin =

Shkarin Шкарин
- Khutor
- Location within Voronezh Oblast Location within Russia
- Coordinates: 51°07′N 40°22′E
- Country: Russia
- Region: Voronezh Oblast
- District: Bobrovsky District
- Time zone: UTC+3:00

Shkarin (Russian: Шкарин) is a rural locality (a khutor) in Oktyabrvskoye Rural Settlement, Bobrovsky District, Voronezh Oblast, Russia. The population was 153 as of 2010. There are 2 streets.

== Geography ==
Shkarin is located 33 km east of Bobrov (the district's administrative centre) by road. Nikolskoye is the nearest rural locality.
