= David Salomon =

David Salomon may refer to:

- David Salomon (author), American author and photographer
- David S. Salomon (born 1947), cancer researcher
- David Salomon, Bronze medalist at the 2008 Mexican National Road Race Championships

== See also ==
- David Solomon (disambiguation)
- David Solomons (disambiguation)
