= Chesmenka =

Chesmenka Чесменка
- Selo
- Location within Voronezh Oblast Location within Russia
- Coordinates: 51°17′N 40°10′E
- Country: Russia
- Region: Voronezh Oblast
- District: Bobrovsky District
- Time zone: UTC+3:00

Chesmenka (Russian: Чесменка) is a rural locality (a selo) and the administrative center of Chesmenskoye Rural Settlement, Bobrovsky District, Voronezh Oblast, Russia. The population was ▼1,045 as of 2024. There are 11 streets.

== Geography ==
Chesmenka is located 29 km northeast of Bobrov (the district's administrative centre) by road. Beryozovka is the nearest rural locality.
