= Mechyotka =

Mechyotka Мечётка
- Selo
- Location within Voronezh Oblast Location within Russia
- Coordinates: 50°54′N 40°04′E
- Country: Russia
- Region: Voronezh Oblast
- District: Bobrovsky District
- Time zone: UTC+3:00

Mechyotka (Russian: Мечётка) is a rural locality (a selo) and the administrative center of Mechyotskoye Rural Settlement, Bobrovsky District, Voronezh Oblast, Russia. There are 33 streets with a population of 1,100 as of 2010.

== Geography ==
Mechyotka is located 39 km south of Bobrov (the district's administrative centre) by road. Pchelinovka is the nearest rural locality.
