= Sukhaya Beryozovka =

Sukhaya Beryozovka Сухая Берёзовка
- Selo
- Location within Voronezh Oblast Location within Russia
- Coordinates: 51°10′N 39°59′E
- Country: Russia
- Region: Voronezh Oblast
- District: Bobrovsky District
- Time zone: UTC+3:00

Sukhaya Beryozovka (Russian: Сухая Берёзовка) is a rural locality (a selo) and the administrative center of Sukho-Beryozovskoye Rural Settlement, Bobrovsky District, Voronezh Oblast, Russia. The population was 1,182 as of 2010. There are 7 streets.

== Geography ==
Sukhaya Beryozovka is located 14 km north of Bobrov (the district's administrative centre) by road. Bobrov is the nearest rural locality.
