= Duginka =

Duginka Дугинка
- Settlement
- Location within Voronezh Oblast Location within Russia
- Coordinates: 51°07′N 40°05′E
- Country: Russia
- Region: Voronezh Oblast
- District: Bobrovsky District
- Time zone: UTC+3:00

Duginka (Russian: Дугинка) is a rural locality (a settlement) in Bobrov, Bobrovsky District, Voronezh Oblast, Russia. The population was 64 as of 2010.

== Geography ==
Duginka is located on the left bank of the Bityug River, 8 km northeast of Bobrov (the district's administrative centre) by road. Lushnikovka is the nearest rural locality.
