= Neskuchny =

Neskuchny Нескучный
- Settlement
- Location within Voronezh Oblast Location within Russia
- Coordinates: 51°08′N 39°47′E
- Country: Russia
- Region: Voronezh Oblast
- District: Bobrovsky District
- Time zone: UTC+3:00

Neskuchny (Russian: Нескучный) is a rural locality (a settlement) in Verkhneikoretskoye Rural Settlement, Bobrovsky District, Voronezh Oblast, Russia. The population was 159 as of 2010.

== Geography ==
Neskuchny is located 26 km northwest of Bobrov (the district's administrative centre) by road. Nikolskoye 2-ye is the nearest rural locality.
