= Lushnikovka =

Lushnikovka Лушниковка
- Settlement
- Location within Voronezh Oblast Location within Russia
- Coordinates: 51°05′N 40°05′E
- Country: Russia
- Region: Voronezh Oblast
- District: Bobrovsky District
- Time zone: UTC+3:00

Lushnikovka (Russian: Лушниковка) is a rural locality (a settlement) in Bobrov, Bobrovsky District, Voronezh Oblast, Russia. The population was 543 as of 2010. There are 9 streets.

== Geography ==
Lushnikovka is located 5 km east of Bobrov (the district's administrative centre) by road. Bobrov is the nearest rural locality.
