= Mitrofanovka, Bobrovsky District, Voronezh Oblast =

Mitrofanovka Митрофановка
- Settlement
- Location within Voronezh Oblast Location within Russia
- Coordinates: 51°00′N 40°21′E
- Country: Russia
- Region: Voronezh Oblast
- District: Bobrovsky District
- Time zone: UTC+3:00

Mitrofanovka (Russian: Митрофановка) is a rural locality (a settlement) in Annovskoye Rural Settlement, Bobrovsky District, Voronezh Oblast, Russia. The population was 143 as of 2010. There are 2 streets.

== Geography ==
Mitrofanovka is located 34 km southeast of Bobrov (the district's administrative centre) by road. Troynya is the nearest rural locality.
