= Karandeyevka =

Karandeyevka Карандеевка
- Settlement
- Location within Voronezh Oblast Location within Russia
- Coordinates: 51°04′N 39°50′E
- Country: Russia
- Region: Voronezh Oblast
- District: Bobrovsky District
- Time zone: UTC+3:00

Karandeyevka (Russian: Карандеевка) is a rural locality (a settlement) in Nikolskoye Rural Settlement, Bobrovsky District, Voronezh Oblast, Russia. The population was 50 as of 2010.

== Geography ==
Karandeyevka is located 15 km west of Bobrov (the district's administrative centre) by road. Sokolovsky is the nearest rural locality.
