= Peskovatka, Bobrovsky District, Voronezh Oblast =

Russia rural locality

Peskovatka Песковатка
- Selo
- Location within Voronezh Oblast Location within Russia
- Coordinates: 51°15′N 39°56′E
- Country: Russia
- Region: Voronezh Oblast
- District: Bobrovsky District
- Time zone: UTC+3:00

Peskovatka (Russian: Песковатка) is a rural locality (a selo) in Yudanovskoye Rural Settlement, Bobrovsky District, Voronezh Oblast, Russia. The population was 448 as of 2010. There are 6 streets.

== Geography ==
Peskovatka is located 24 km north of Bobrov (the district's administrative centre) by road. Yudanovka is the nearest rural locality.
