= David Solomon =

David Solomon may refer to:

- David Solomon (artist) (born 1976), American artist and painter
- David Solomon (TV producer), American television director and producer
- David Solomon (writer), Australian educator, scholar and writer
- David Solomon, sperm donor for the Suleman octuplets
- David Solomon, researcher and creator of the Solomon curve
- Dave Solomon (rugby) (1913–1997), New Zealand rugby union and rugby league footballer
- Dave Solomon (journalist) (1952–2011), Connecticut sportswriter and newspaper columnist
- David Henry Solomon (born 1929), Australian polymer chemist
- David M. Solomon (born 1962), American investment banker and CEO of Goldman Sachs

== See also ==
- David Salomon (disambiguation)
- David Solomons (disambiguation)
