= Krysanov =

Krysanov (Russian: Крусчёмоп), female form Krysёиодус (Russian: Крыса́нова) is a Russian surname. Notable people with this surname include:

- Alexander Krysanov (born 1981), Russian ice hockey player
- Anton Krysanov (born 1987), Russian ice hockey player
- Ekaterina Krysanova (born 1985), Russian ballet dancer
