= List of Tau Epsilon Phi members =

Tau Epsilon Phi is an American collegiate social fraternity that was founded at Columbia University in 1910. Since its establishment, the fraternity has chartered 144 chapters and colonies, chiefly located at universities and colleges on the East Coast.

Following are some notable alumni.

== Academics ==
- Cary Cooper – professor and psychologist
- Ira Pauly – professor and chairman, Department of Psychiatry and Behavioral Sciences, University of Nevada School of Medicine
- Jonas Salk – discoverer of polio vaccine and a professorship at the University of Pittsburgh School of Medicine

== Architecture ==
- Max Abramovitz – architect
- Guy Fulton – architect

== Business ==
- Samuel J. LeFrak – real estate developer
- Harris Rosen – founder of the Rosen Hotels & Resorts
- Bernard Siegel – executive director of the nonprofit Regenerative Medicine Foundation
- Eli Timoner – entrepreneur and business executive most notable for creating Air Florida

== Entertainment ==
- Jeff Altman – stand-up comedian
- Howard Benson – Grammy-winning music producer and multi-instrumentalist
- Larry David – actor, writer, comedian, and television producer
- David Duchovny – actor, writer, and director
- Mat Franco – entertainer, magician, winner of America's Got Talent
- Benny Goodman – musician and bandleader
- Larry King – television and radio host
- Gary Kott – writer and supervising producer of The Cosby Show
- Harold Rome – Tin Pan Alley and Broadway songwriter
- Ed Sabol – filmmaker, founder of NFL Films
- Robert Sherman – songwriter
- Jerry Springer – television and radio host
- George Stephanopoulos – television journalist
- Marc Turtletaub – movie producer

== Law ==
- Irving R. Kaufman – judge with the United States Court of Appeals for the Second Circuit
- Leo M. Gordon – judge with the United States Court of International Trade
- Robert C. Wright – judge with the Delaware County Court of Common Pleas and Pennsylvania House of Representative
- Joseph Wapner – judge on The People's Court

== Literature and journalism ==
- Eli N. Evans – author about the Jewish experience in the Southern United States and speechwriter for President Lyndon B. Johnson
- Adam Goldstein – author
- Louis Harris – journalist and founder of the Harris Poll
- Mike Sager – author and award-winning journalist

== Military ==
- Omar Bradley – General of the Army and Chairman of the Joint Chiefs of Staff (honorary)
- Neil Woodward – American Naval officer and a former NASA astronaut

== Politics ==
- Dwight D. Eisenhower – 34th President of the United States (honorary)
- Kenneth Gottlieb, U.S. House of Representatives
- Vincent C. Gray – mayor of Washington, D.C.
- Rick Kriseman – mayor of St. Petersburg, Florida
- Elliott H. Levitas – U.S. House of Representatives
- Marvin Mandel – Governor of Maryland
- David Saperstein – United States Ambassador-at-Large for International Religious Freedom
- Melvin Steinberg – Lieutenant Governor of Maryland
- Kirill Reznik –Maryland House of Delegates
- Michael S. Steele – Lieutenant Governor of Maryland and chairman of the Republican National Committee
- Rick Santorum – United States Senator
- Robert C. Wright – Pennsylvania House of Representative and judge Delaware County Court of Common Pleas

== Science and engineering ==
- Ray Kurzweil – computer scientist, author, and futurist
- David S. Salomon – breast cancer researcher who discovered the cancer gene
- Chad Trujillo – astronomer and co-discoverer of 12 trans-Neptunian objects, including Eris

== Sports ==
- Red Auerbach – general manager, Boston Celtics
- Bryan Clark – professional wrestler
- Jedd Fisch – football coach of the Michigan Wolverines
- Eddie Fogler – college basketball coach
- Howie Roseman – general manager of the Philadelphia Eagles
- Jared Ross – professional hockey player
- Harry Schwartz – college football player
- Bob Vogel – professional football player with the Baltimore Colts
- Neal Walk – college and professional basketball player
