= Brahin =

Brahin may refer to:

- Brahin (meteorite), a pallasite meteorite found in Belarus
- Brahin district, Gomel region, Belarus
  - Brahin, Belarus, a town

== See also ==
- Bragin (disambiguation)
