= Juan Carr =

Argentine activist

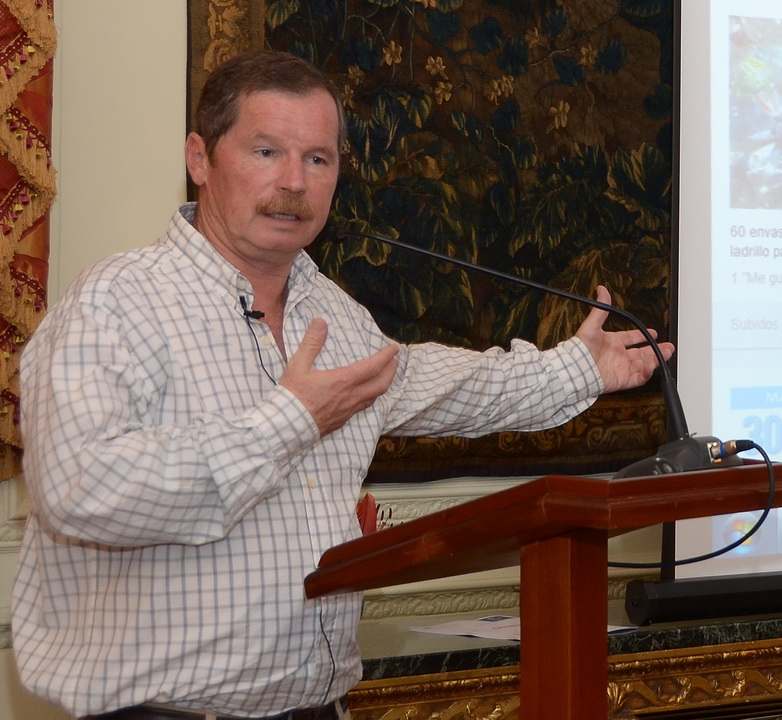
- Born: Juan Alejandro Carr Villazón; 28 November 1961 (age 63); Buenos Aires, Argentina
- Education: University of Buenos Aires
- Occupation(s): Activist, veterinarian
- Organization: Solidarity Network
- Spouse: María Alemán Paunero
- Children: 5

Juan Alejandro Carr (born November 28, 1961) is an Argentine social activist, founder of a social and cultural movement called Solidarity Network in 1995. He was nominated by the Nobel Peace Prize by the UNESCO in 2012.

== Early life and career ==
Juan Alejandro Carr Villazón was born on November 28, 1961, in the City of Buenos Aires, Argentina. His father was a lawyer, and his mother worked as a language teacher. He married in September 1988 María Alemán Paunero, descendent of general Wenceslao Paunero. They had five children: María, Francisco, Martín, Ana and Josefina Carr Alemán.

He entered the Scouting movement at age 9. The day he turned 18 years of age the first thing he did was donating blood, an action he repeated and promoted since then for many years. That same age he moved to Formosa Province, to live with the Wichi and Pilagá indigenous communities, visiting hospitals, hospices, leprosy hospitals and meal centers.

In 1980 he entered the Faculty of Veterinary Sciences in the University of Buenos Aires, where he received the degree of veterinarian. Previously he had worked as a plumber.

He was diagnosed with hodgkin lymphoma in 1987, fighting against cancer for two years with chemotherapy and regular controls, until 1988. He was told by his doctors that the probability of having children with his wife, who he married in 1988. Nevertheless, he eventually had five children.

In 1995 together with his wife and three friends he founded Red Solidaria (Solidarity Network). In 1997 he was recognised as Social Innovator by the social entrepreneurship organisation Ashoka, based in Washington DC. He was nominated for the Hilton International Award in 1999, and for the Right Livelihood Award in 2002.

He was chosen as the "Most Reliable Social Entrepreneur" by the readers of the magazine Reader's Digest of Argentina. He was declared Distinguished Citizen of the City of Buenos Aires in 2014, and he was recognised in 2019 by the Noticias magazine in the field of social impact.

During the Bicentennial Celebration of the University of Buenos Aires, he was recognised as one of the Distinguished Personalities that had studied there. He also participated in the documentary 26 People to Save the World, hosted by the Argentine journalist Jorge Lanata.

== Solidarity Network ==
Juan Carr founded the Solidarity Network (in Spanish Red Solidaria) in February 1995, and he has organised several campaigns and social movement with this organisation. Currently the Solidarity Network has over 74 branches in Argentina and around 1.200 volunteers. This community-based organisation has 1.100.000 contributors, a number that triples in emergency situations.

It is not an association, nor an organisation. It does not have papers not juridical personality. It is a "cultural phenomenon". It is the citizens getting organised and committed with society. We wanted to generate a culture of service and participation, accompanying others in their pain, their suffering, and it worked, just like that, quite freely.

— Juan Carr

The Solidarity Network from the beginning connected people with free time with other people in necessity. Through a radio programme and media they discovered the way to help as they wanted to: each time one of them appeared in the news the phones would not stop ringing.

Juan Carr delegated his role as Director of the Solidarity Network in 2008 to Manuel Lozano, in order to focus in replicating his organisation in other countries. The Solidarity Network is thus now present in Mexico City, Barcelona, Boston, Asunción, Santiago de Chile, and cities in Ecuador, Uruguay, Brazil, Colombia and China.

Together with other professionals, Juan Carr founded in 2009 the first University Centre to Fight Against Hunger in the Faculty of Veterinary Sciences of the University of Buenos Aires. Two years later he founded with three friends the communication agency Mundo Invisible (Invisible World), whose objective is to provide press and communication tools to the most disadvantaged around the world
