= Bragan =

Bragan is a surname. Notable people with the surname include:

- Bobby Bragan (1917–2010), American baseball player, manager, and coach
- Jim Bragan (1929–2001), American baseball player, manager and league president

== See also ==
- Bragin, another surname
