= David Solomons =

David Solomons may refer to:

- David Solomons (photographer) (born 1965), British street photographer
- David Solomons (accounting scholar) (1912–1995), British-born accounting scholar who became an American citizen in 1976

== See also ==
- David Salomon (disambiguation)
- David Solomon (disambiguation)
