= 26 personas para salvar al mundo =

26 personas para salvar al mundo (English: 26 people to save the world) is a documentary series hosted by Argentine journalist Jorge Lanata, produced for Infinito in 2011, in which Lanata interviews 26 people whom he believes have the collective power to "save the world". One of his main conclusions from the series is that "...Philosophy has fallen behind technology. Technology found a lot of answers that had no philosophical support". (Note: "la filosofía quedó atrás de la tecnología. La tecnología encontró un montón de respuestas que no tienen sustento filosófico".)

== Interviews ==
Among those interviewed are the historian David Carpenter; the researcher David S. Salomon; the rabbi of the stars Yehuda Berg, the writer Eduardo Galeano; one of the original authors of the Digital Universe Atlas, Carter Emmart, astronaut Jeffrey Hoffman, and the French Buddhist monk Matthieu Ricard
