= Pavel Kasatkin =

Soviet poet (1915–1987)

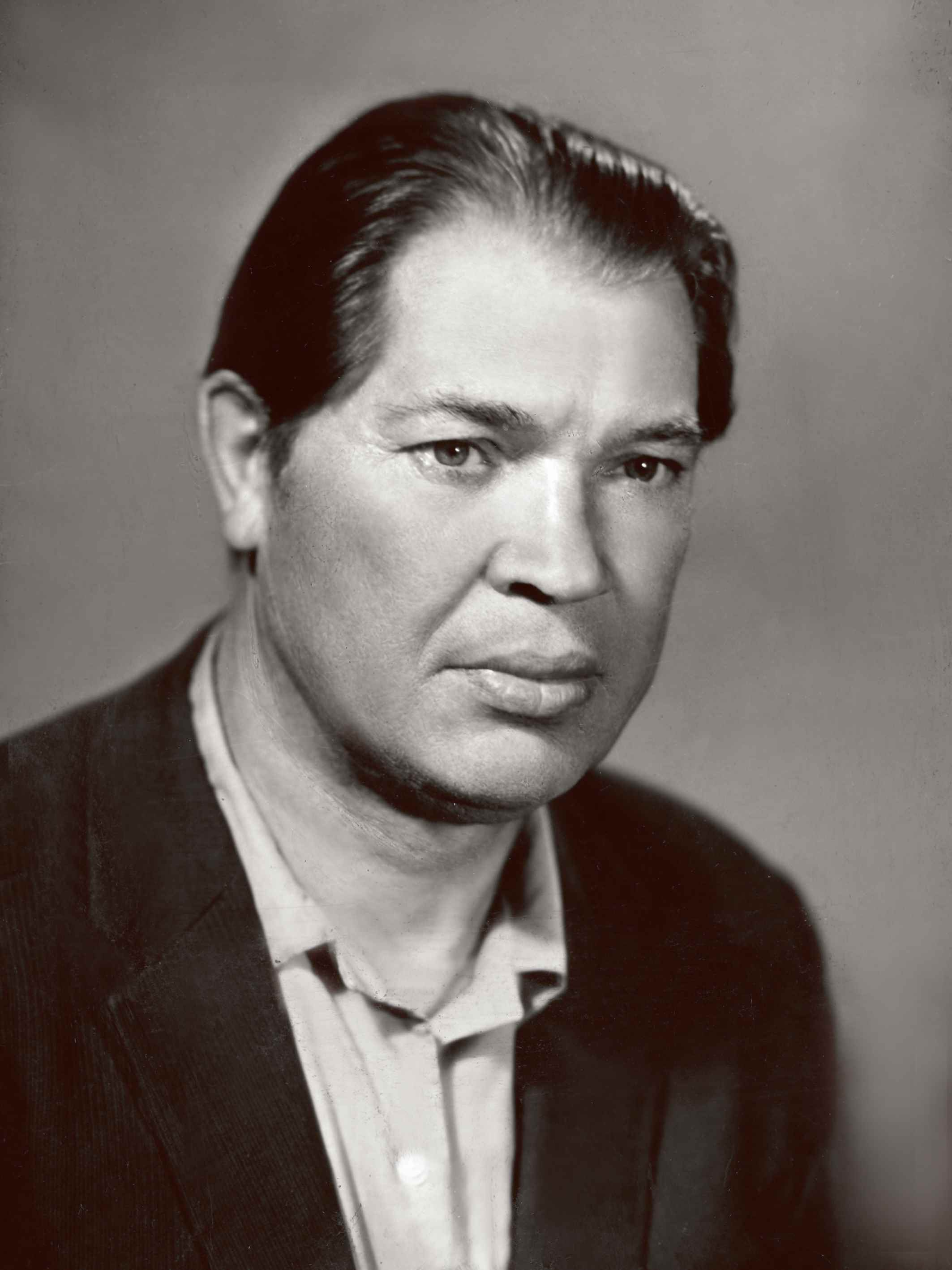
- Pavel Kasatkin (1984)
- Born: 14 December 1915; Semyon-Aleksandrowka, Voronezh Oblast, Russian Empire
- Died: 19 May 1987 (aged 71); Voronezh, RSFSR, USSR
- Occupations: Poet, regional writer
- Writing career
- Period: 1938–1987
- Genres: Poem, lyric

Pavel Yefimowich Kasatkin (Russian: Павел Ефимович Касаткин) 14 December [O.S. 1 December] 1915 – 19 May 1987) was a Soviet poet.

== Early life ==
Pavel Yefimowich Kasatkin was born on 14 December [O.S. 1 December] 1915 in the village of Semyon-Aleksandrovka (Russian: Семён-Александровка), Bobrovsly uyezd (now Bobrovsky District), Voronezh Oblast. He was the 6th child.

His childhood was characterized by poverty and a rural life. He lost his mother early in life and as a consequence was cared for by his step-mother. He completed his schooling at the agricultural school in Bobrov. Soon after, he moved to Leningrad for further studies.

In 1936 Kasatkin was awarded his Doctors Degree, from the Leningrad Medical Technical School. Immediately after this, he was transferred and served in the Red Army, where he remained until his retirement in Mongolia (1948).

Pawel Kasatkin worked at the front in the Japanese-Soviet War as a field doctor in the rank of feldsher. He rescued soldiers from both conflict parties.

During this time, in 1938, he wrote his first poems.

Parts of his first works were printed in Irkutsk in 1942 and Ulan-Ude in 1947. Later, they were published throughout the Soviet Union.
After his discharge from the army in 1948 he moved to Voronezh. He worked there until 1950 as a head doctor of the medical point in Bobrov. Following this period, he started working as a journalist for various local newspapers. In 1953 first book, a collection of poems, Russian: Родная Степь, romanized: Rodnaya Step, lit. 'the Native Steppe'" was published.

In 1958 he graduated from the Voronezh Higher Party School of the Communist Party of the Soviet Union.

In 1960, Kasatkin joined the Union of Soviet Writers by personal invitation from the board leader and in 1975 he was awarded with the Order of the Badge of Honour for his merits for local and Soviet literature.

On 19 May 1987, Kasatkin died of cancer in his hometown of Voronezh.

== Personal life ==
While studying together, Kasatkin met his future wife Antonina Magazinskaya (1919–2014) and they married on 13 October 1938. They remained married until his death in 1987.
In 1939 his first child, Eduard, was born in Mongolia.
His second child, Tamara, was born in Voronezh in 1951.

== Works ==
Kassatkin drew on his creative inspiration from his journalistic activity and his travels.His works were compared with the works of the local writer and poet Aleksey Koltsov..

== Awards ==
=== Military awards ===
- 1945 Medal "For the Victory over Japan" (Russian: Медаль «За победу над Японией»)
- 1945 Medal for Battle Merit (Russian: Медаль «За Воееьне Заслуги»)
- 1948 Mongolian Medal "For the Victory over Japan" (Mongolian: «бугд найрамдах монгол ард улс. Японыг Ялсны Тфлфф Медал»)
- 1981 Merit medal for the battle at Chalchin Gol (Mongolian: «Халхын Голын Яалат Медалийн Унзмлзх»)
- 1985 Order of the Patriotic War (Russian: «Орден Отечественной войны»)

=== Civil awards ===
- 1972 Badge for Excellence in Cultural Patronage over the USSR Armed Forces (Russian: Знак «Отличник культурного шефства над вооруженными силами СССР»)
- 1975 Order of the Badge of Honour (Russian: Орден «Знак Почёта»)

== Books ==
- Native Steppe, The Voronezh Book Publishing House, Voronezh, 1953
- Pridonye, The Voronezh Book Publishing House, Voronezh, 1959
- Golden Rains, The Voronezh Book Publishing House, Voronezh, 1961
- Voronezh Riches, The Voronezh Book Publishing House, Voronezh, 1963
- Winter Fairy Tale, Central-Chernozem books publishers, Voronezh, 1965
- Koltsov's Land, Books publishers <<Sovjetskaja Russia>>, Moskau, 1965
- Steppe Rainbow, Central-Chernozem books publishers, Voronezh, 1967
- Monologue of Spring, Central-Chernozem books publishers, Voronezh, 1970
- Nightingales, Central-Chernozem books publishers, Voronezh, 1973
- On the Meadow, Central-Chernozem books publishers, Voronezh, 1975
- My Field, Central-Chernozem books publishers, Voronezh, 1979, Library of Congress-Class.: PG3482.5.S29 M6
- On My Own Footpath (Своей тропинкой), Central-Chernozem books publishers, Voronezh, 1984, Library of Congress-Class.: MLCS 84/13319 (P)
- Sacred Land (Заповедная сторона), Central-Chernozem books publishers, Voronezh, 1987
