= Bragin =

Bragin (Russian: Брагин) is a Russian male surname, its feminine counterpart is Bragina. It may refer to

- Akhat Bragin (1953–1995), Ukrainian businessman
- Dmitry Bragin (born 1982), Russian racing driver
- Igor Bragin (born 1965), Russian association football player
- Rob Bragin, American TV producer and writer
- Roman Bragin (born 1987), Russian volleyball player
- Sergei Bragin (born 1967), Estonian association football player
- Sergey Mikhailovich Bragin (1894–1965), Russian scientist and engineer
- Valeri Bragin (born 1956), Russian ice hockey forward
- Vladislav Bragin (born 1998), Russian footballer
- Lyudmila Bragina (born 1943), Russian Olympic runner

== Other ==
- Bragin (meteorite)
- Bragin (town)
- Bragin District
