= David Solomon (artist) =

American painter (born 1976)

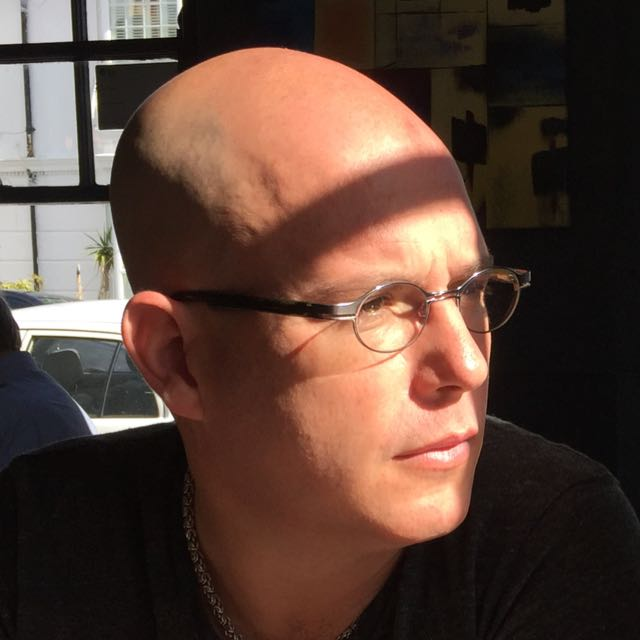
Solomon in Hove, UK in 2016

David Solomon (born 1976, Kingston, New York, died 2017, Santa Fe, New Mexico) was an American artist and painter.

Solomon studied at the San Francisco Art Institute and was primarily based in Santa Fe, NM, and Houston, TX. An active artist and gallery professional, his work has been shown in several exhibitions and art fairs across the country, including David Richard Contemporary, Gerald Peters Gallery in Santa Fe, Peter Marcelle Gallery in Bridgehampton NY, Dean Jenson Gallery in Milwaukee, Brown Art Space in San Francisco, Aqua Art Fair in Miami, and Cindy Lisica Gallery in Houston. His exhibitions earned reviews in Art in America and Art Ltd Magazine, among others.

"David Solomon has been an active member of the Santa Fe art community for the 11 years he has lived here, as both a painter and an independent curator," writes Jan Ernst Adlmann in Art in America magazine. "His latest exhibition demonstrated not only his artistic maturity but also his consistent drive toward pictorial originality."

"Solomon continues to map inner territories of the imagination through an idiosyncratic synthesis of figurative inferences and abstract expression," writes Jon Carver, Art Ltd Magazine

"The artist's forte is the depiction of space without defining it," writes Kathryn M Davis in The Magazine. "He likes to suggest dimensionality without showing it, thus enticing the viewer to engage. Once the vocabulary of lyrical abstraction and symbolism emerges, the playfulness of the forms becomes clearer, while their significance deepens."

== Life ==
The artist unexpectedly died in December 2017 just before he was to exhibit what would be his final series, Falling Bodies. The luminous oil paintings on aluminum with steel frames were shown posthumously in January 2018 at Cindy Lisica Gallery alongside sculptures and drawings by Rachel Gardner in the 2-person show Fall to the Wild. The abstracted and repeated forms of drips, seeds, eyes and bodies act as elements in colorful compositions referencing Quantum Holographic and Wave theories. The artist's interest in metaphysics and the intersections of science and philosophy are evident.
