= David Solomons (accounting scholar) =

British/American accounting scholar

David Solomons (October 11, 1912 – February 12, 1995) was a British/American accounting scholar, known from his work on accounting and business management, its concepts, standards, history and politicization.

== Biography ==
Born in London, Solomons obtained his BCom from the London School of Economics in 1932. In 1936 he obtained his Chartered Accountant licence for England and Wales, and became Associate of the Chartered Accountants.

From 1936 to 1939 he was accountant at Lawrence Robson & Co in London, now Robson Rhodes. In the Second World War he served in the British Army, where he was captured in 1942 during the North African Campaign. In internment camps in Italy and Germany he lectured accounting and economics until his release in April 1945.

On invitation of his undergraduate teacher Arnold Plant, Solomons started his academic career at the London School of Economics in 1946 as part-time lecturer. After the death of Stanley W. Rowland in 1947 he work full-time, and was appointed reader in accounting in 1948. He worked under William T. Baxter, who was appointed the first full-time professor of accounting in the UK in the same year. In 1955 Solomons moved to the University of Bristol, where he was appointed professor of accounting. In 1959 he was appointed professor of accounting at the Wharton School of the University of Pennsylvania in 1974. He decided to emigrate and became American citizen in 1976. In 1983 he retired from the Wharton School.

Solomons was chairman of the Association of University Teachers of Accounting (today British Accounting Association). He was part of the AICPA's Wheat Committee chaired by Francis M. Wheat, "to study the establishment of accounting principles and to make recommendations for improving that process". In the year 1977–78 he was president of the American Accounting Association. Solomons was inducted into the Accounting Hall of Fame in 1992.

David Solomons died at his home in Swarthmore, Pennsylvania on February 12, 1995.

== Selected publications ==
- Solomons, David. Divisional performance: measurement and control. Homewood, Illinois: Irwin, 1965.
- Solomons, David. Guidelines for financial reporting standards. Taylor & Francis, 1997.

Articles, a selection

- Solomons, David. "The historical development of costing". Studies in costing (1952): 1–52.
- Solomons, David. "Economic and accounting concepts of income". Accounting Review (1961): 374–383.
- Solomons, David. "Economic and accounting concepts of cost and value". Modern Accounting Theory (1966): 117–140.
- Solomons, David. "The politicization of accounting". Journal of Accountancy 146.5 (1978): 65–72.
- Solomons, David. "Accounting and social change: a neutralist view". Accounting, Organizations and Society 16.3 (1991): 287–295.
- Solomons, David. "Costing Pioneers: Some Links with the Past". The Accounting Historians Journal 21.2 (1994): 136
