= The Magazine (magazine) =

Entertainment magazine in Canada (1998–2015)

- Categories: Entertainment magazine
- Frequency: Monthly
- First issue: Fall 1998
- Final issue: 2015
- Country: Canada
- Based in: Toronto
- Language: English
- Website: www.themagazine.ca
- ISSN: 1493-5120

The Magazine is a monthly digest entertainment magazine targeted to youth that was published in Canada from 1998 to 2015. In addition to music, movies, television, and contests, it featured a variety of articles on social issues such as the environment, healthy eating habits, and self-help in cooperation with Kids Help Phone.

On November 1, 2010, The Magazine celebrated its tenth anniversary as a monthly publication.

As of 2015, The Magazine had ceased publication.

== History ==
Community Programs Group, parent company to The Magazine began producing children's entertainment in 1984. The company got its start making educational films about subjects such as bicycle safety and rules of the road (Right Riders), first aid, and alcohol and substance abuse (Mr. Finley's Pharmacy, Choose). In 1990, CPG partnered with Marvel to publish Spider-Man comics with drug awareness and safety messages. This became a series of five comics published with Marvel for distribution across Canada by police officers during safety talks at elementary schools.

In 1993, CPG launched a quarterly publication called The New Jr. Jays Magazine. This magazine contained lifestyle tips, Toronto Blue Jays facts, and a comic strip that reflected the diverse culture of a new generation of Canadian kids. The magazines were given away at Blue Jays games and in schools by visiting police officers. According to the Canadian Association of Chiefs of Police, "The publication was considered an 'icebreaker' for Police Officers throughout Canada during school visits."

The New Jr. Jays Magazine ran from Spring 1993 until Fall 1998, at which point it rebranded as The Magazine Not For Adults (sometimes stylized as The Magazine NFA, The Mag NFA, or simply The Mag). Although The Magazine Not For Adults increasingly turned its focus away from the Blue Jays toward popular music, movies, TV, and other entertainment, the Jr. Jays comic strip contined to run until its final appearance in the Fall 2000 issue.

In November 2000, The Magazine Not For Adults shifted to a monthly publication schedule. This coincided with its expansion into point-of-sale retail, appearing at check-out counters across Canada, including in grocery stores such as A&P, Dominion, Foodtown, and 7-Eleven. As readership grew, CPG maintained its founding commitment to give back to the community by various means. For example, in addition to distributing the magazine for free in schools, CPG donated the entire cover price of The Magazine Not For Adults to youth programs offered by the Canadian Association of Chiefs of Police and Kids Help Phone.

Eventually, the publication dropped Not For Adults from its name. By the time it celebrated its 100th issue in September 2009, it was branded simply as The Magazine.

Amidst a changing media landscape and broader shift toward online advertising, The Magazine relaunched its website in April 2011 with a brand new look and archived content.

== Comics ==
The Magazine had a long history of original comic strips which have come and gone over the years. Some of these included:

- Jr. Jays (Created by Eric Conroy and Jim Craig): Dr. Jay, a space- and time-travelling android from the year 3052, falls in love with baseball and establishes himself as Trainer for the best team in Major League Baseball in 1993, the Toronto Blue Jays. Dr. Jay assembles a group of kids known as the Jr. Jays who, together with their dog Crunchie, get up to all sorts of hijinx. They run into real Blue Jays players like Roberto Alomar along the way.
- Catchy-22: This comic was a satirical look at what would happen if a disgraced ex-popstar went after the corrupt and vampiric music industry at a time when they were bogged down in a war with people who download music.
- Doomsnight: A comic with strange places, strange people, and a new strange story every month.
- Sc ool (Created by Brooks Gray): This comic strip was about the day-to-day antics of D and his school friends.

The Magazine stopped printing comics in February 2010, but continued to make them available online.

== The Magazine Online ==
The Magazine's official website included many features for its readers, most notably the MagBoard and the Blog. The MagBoard was a message board where registered members could post about a variety of topics. Comics, games, and wallpapers were available on the website. The board's most popular topic, TPAM, reached 1,000 pages on 24 February 2010.

== Notable Alumni ==
- Ed Conroy: A former managing editor, he is a cultural historian and founder of Retrontario, an online platform that distributes recovered television clips and other ephemera from the 1970s, 1980s, 1990s, and early 2000s.
