= Maksim Potapov =

Russian ice hockey player

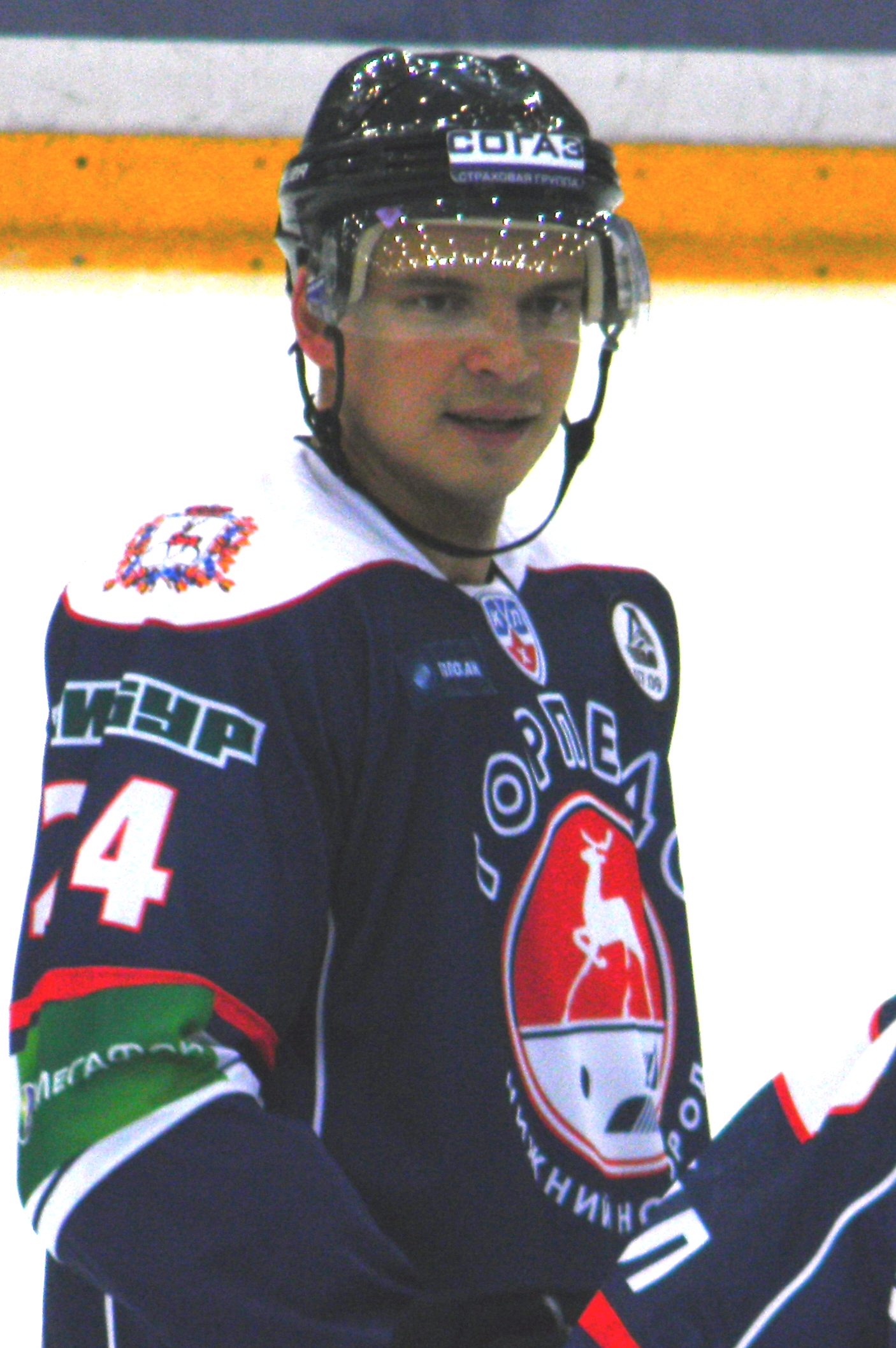
- Born: 25 May 1980 (age 44); Voronezh, Russian SFSR
- Height: 5 ft 11 in (180 cm)
- Weight: 187 lb (85 kg; 13 st 5 lb)
- Position: Left wing
- Shot: Left
- Played for: Detroit Vipers; Lokomotiv Yaroslavl; Torpedo Nizhny Novgorod; Spartak Moscow; Molot-Prikamye Perm; Atlant Moscow Oblast; Nippon Paper Cranes
- NHL draft: Undrafted
- Playing career: 2000–2019

Maksim Potapov (born 25 May 1980) is a Russian former professional ice hockey player who most recently played for the Nippon Paper Cranes in the Asia League Ice Hockey. He previously played extensively in the Kontinental Hockey League (KHL).
