= Yuri Klinskikh =

- Also known as: Yuri Khoy
- Born: Yuri Nikolayevich Klinskikh; 27 July 1964; Voronezh, RSFSR, Soviet Union
- Died: 4 July 2000 (aged 35) Voronezh, Russia
- Genres: Author song, folk-rock, hard rock, punk-rock, rap rock, rap metal
- Occupations: Songwriter, musician, arranger
- Instruments: Vocals, guitar, keyboards
- Years active: 1987—2000
- Labels: Black Box, Gala Records
- Formerly of: Sektor Gaza

Yuri Nikolayevich Klinskikh (Russian: Юрий Николаевич Клинских; July 27, 1964 – July 4, 2000) was a Russian musician, singer, songwriter, arranger, and founder of the rock band Sektor Gaza. He was also known as Yuri "Khoy".

== Biography ==
From 1982 to 1984, Klinskikh served in the Soviet Army in the Far East. From 1984 to 1986, he worked in the traffic police, and then as a milling-machine operator in a factory. He started writing songs as a hobby in his early school years.«Сундук и мертвец» He began performing in 1987. In 1988, he founded the band Sektor Gaza.

On July 4, 2000, Klinskikh reportedly felt severe chest and stomach pain, but chose not to cancel a meeting later that day to film a music video for the song "Noch Straha" ("Night of Fear"). He died that day, at the age of 35, in Voronezh. Although it was rumored that he died due to either heart failure or Hepatitis C caused by severe alcohol and possibly drug abuse, the exact cause of his death remains unknown since an official investigation was never carried out. He is buried on the Levoberezhniy Сemetery of Voronezh.

== Discography ==
=== Solo album ===
1981—1985 — Акустический альбом (Acoustic album)

=== Sektor Gaza ===
- 1999 - Лирика (Lirika)

==== Demo albums ====
- 1989 — Плуги-вуги (Plows-woogie)
- 1989 — Колхозный панк (Kolkhoz Punk)

==== Formal albums ====
- 1990 — Зловещие мертвецы (The Evil Dead)
- 1990 — Ядрёна вошь (Vigorous Louse)
- 1991 — Ночь перед Рождеством (The Night before Christmas)
- 1991 — Колхозный панк (Kolkhoz Punk)
- 1992 — Гуляй, мужик! (Make Merry, Man!)
- 1993 — Нажми на газ (Hit The Gas)
- 1993 — Сектор газа (Gaza strip)
- 1994 — Танцы после порева (Dancing after Sex)
- 1994 — Кащей Бессмертный (Kashchey The Immortal)
- 1996 — Газовая атака (Gas Attack)
- 1997 — Наркологический университет миллионов (Narcological University for Millions)
- 1997 — Сектор газа (Sector of Gas) [Re-recording]
- 2000 — Восставший из Ада (Hellraiser)

==== Remix album ====
- 1999 — Extasy — Techno-style remixes by Aleksey Bryantsev (DJ Krot)
- 1999 — Extasy 2 — Techno-style remixes by Aleksey Bryantsev (DJ Krot)
