= Sergey Mikhailovich Bragin =

Russian scientist and engineer (1894–1965)

- Born: Sergey Mikhailovich Bragin; Сергей Михайлович Брагин; 1894
- Died: 1965 (aged 70–71); Moscow
- Occupations: Scientist specialist in the field of electrical engineering
- Awards: USSR State Prize

Sergey Mikhailovich Bragin (Russian: Сергей Михайлович Брагин; 1894–1965) was a Russian scientist, educator, a specialist in the field of electrical engineering, and a laureate of the USSR State Prize.

== Biography ==
Sergey Mikhailovich Bragin was born in 1894. He graduated from the Leningrad Electrotechnical Institute (now the St. Petersburg State Electrotechnical University). Beginning from 1922, he worked at the Sevkabel plant in Leningrad, and at the same time was as a lecturer at the Leningrad Electrotechnical Institute. In 1932 he was appointed the chief engineer of the Soyuzkabel Trust in Moscow. From 1933 to 1938, he was the deputy director for the technical part at the Moskabel plant, and then — chief of the cable department of the Glavtsvetmetobrabotka Trust.

In 1939, he was appointed the head of the newly established cable technology department at the faculty of electrical materials of the Moscow Power Engineering Institute. Just before his appointment, Sergey Bragin was awarded the Stalin Prize for his scientific work. He headed the department until 1961, which, under his leadership prepared hundreds of Soviet engineers. During World War II, he was awarded the Order of the Red Star for his merits in the field of science.

Sergei Mikhailovich Bragin was the author of numerous scientific works, including Electrical and thermal calculation of the cable (1960) and Electrical cable (1955). He died in 1965 and was buried at the Cherkizovskoe Cemetery in Moscow.
