= Francis M. Wheat =

American lawyer (1921 – 2000)

Commissioner of the United States Securities and Exchange Commission
- In office 1964–1969
- Nominated by: Lyndon B. Johnson
- Preceded by: Manuel F. Cohen
- Succeeded by: Syd Herlong

Personal details
- Born: February 4, 1921 Los Angeles, California, U.S.
- Died: July 21, 2000 (aged 79)
- Party: Democratic
- Education: Pomona College (BS); Harvard Law School (JD)
- Occupation: Lawyer

Francis M. Wheat (1921–2000) was an American business lawyer. He served as Securities and Exchange Commissioner between 1964 and 1969. After leaving the SEC, he helped from the Financial Accounting Standards Board.
