= Sektor Gaza =

Russian punk rock band

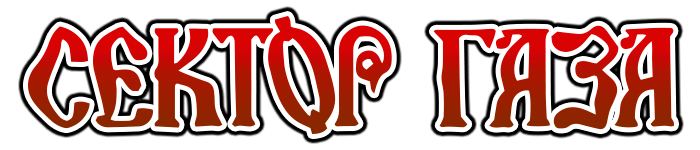

Background information
- Origin: Voronezh, Russian SFSR, Soviet Union
- Genres: Punk rock, Russian rock, pop-rock, folk rock, alternative metal, rap metal, comedy rock, hard rock
- Years active: 1987–2000; 2000–2006 as EX-Sektor Gaza; 2017-Now as Sektor Gaza Festival
- Labels: Black Box; Gala Records
- Past members: Yuri Klinskikh † and others
- Website: sektorgaza.net/english.htm

Sektor Gaza (Russian: Се́ктор Га́за, Gaza Sector) (Note: "The name of the group is not a direct reference to the autonomous territory but to an ecologically contaminated industrial zone of Voronezh, which the locals called 'Sektor Gaza', although the Russian name for both is identical") was a Soviet and Russian punk rock band from Voronezh, founded in 1987 by Yuri Klinskikh.

== History ==
Sektor Gaza was founded in Voronezh by Yuri Klinskikh, also known as Yuri Khoy. The group is named after an industrial district of Voronezh nicknamed Sektor Gaza due to its high levels of environmental contamination (also corresponds to the Russian name of Gaza Strip). Sektor Gaza's first performance as a group occurred at the local rock club on 9 June 1988, but the group's official date of establishment is traditionally given as 5 December 1987, the date of Klinskikh's first solo performance of material from Sektor Gaza's future repertoire at the Voronezh Rock Club.

In 1989, the group recorded the demo tapes Plugi-vugi (Russian: Плуги-вуги, lit. 'Plows-woogie (i.e., pun on "Boogie-woogie")') and Kolkhozny pank (Russian: Колхозный панк, lit. 'Kolkhoz Punk').

In 1990, the group recorded the albums Zloveshchiye Mertvetsy (Russian: Зловещие Мертвецы, lit. 'The Sinister Dead') and Yadryona Vosh (Russian: Ядрёна Вошь, lit. 'Vigorous Louse') in a professional recording studio in Voronezh. Klinskikh sold his motorcycle in order to afford to rent the studio.

In 1991, Sektor Gaza made their television debut, appearing on the programs 50x50 and Programma A (Russian: Программа А) on the Central Television of the USSR. The music video for "Kolkhozny pank" was shown on the youth program Do 16 i starshe... (Russian: До 16 и старше...), contributing to the group's fame across the country. In the same year, the group recorded the album Noch pered Rozhdestvom (Russian: Ночь перед Рождеством, lit. 'The Night Before Christmas') at the Mir studio in Moscow and rerecorded the album Kolkhozny pank at Gala Records.

In 1992, Sektor Gaza released their sixth studio album, Gulyay, muzhik! (Russian: Гуляй, мужик!, lit. 'Have fun, man!') and toured extensively. In 1993, the group released Nazhmi na gaz (Russian: Нажми на газ, lit. 'Hit the gas').

In 1994, Sektor Gaza released Kashchey Bessmertny (Russian: Кащей Бессмертный, lit. 'Kashchey the Immortal'), a punk-opera based on the famous Russian folklore figure. On this album, Klinskikh performed original lyrics to the melodies of songs by groups such as AC/DC, Queen, Ace of Base, and Nirvana.

In 1995, the group performed at the Rock Summer festival in Tallinn. They also toured Germany and Israel and performed at the Gorbunov Palace of Culture. Also in August, the single "Tuman" was released.

In 1996, Sektor Gaza released Gazovaya Ataka (Russian: Газовая Атака), which marked a change in the group's style and a move away from obscene lyrics. The music video for the track "Tuman" (Russian: «Туман», lit. 'Fog') off this album made it into the rotation of many Russian television channels.

In 1997, the group released Narcologichesky Universitet Millionov (Russian: Наркологический Университет Миллионов, lit. 'Narcological University of Millions'). The song "Pora domoy" (Russian: «Пора домой», lit. 'Time to go home') from this album became a hit.

In the summer of 1998, Klinskikh and Aleksey Bryantsev (DJ Krot) arranged some Sektor Gaza songs as techno remixes, which were released on the album Extasy in 1999.

In October 2000, the group released a new album, Vosstavshy iz Ada (Russian: Восставший из Ада, lit. 'Hellraiser'). Klinskikh's health was in decline due to liver disease. On 4 July 2000, Klinskikh complained of strong pains in his stomach and the left side of his chest. He chose not to cancel a meeting later that day to film a music video. He suffered heart failure shortly thereafter. Klinskikh died in Voronezh at the age of 35.

== Discography ==
=== Demo albums ===
- 1989: Плуги-вуги (Plows-woogie)
- 1989: Колхозный Панк (Kolkhoz Punk)

=== Studio albums ===
- 1990: Зловещие Мертвецы (The Evil Dead)
- 1990: Ядрёна Вошь (Vigorous Louse)
- 1991: Ночь перед Рождеством (The Night before Christmas)
- 1991: Колхозный Панк (Kolkhoz Punk)
- 1992: Гуляй, мужик! (Make Merry, Man!)
- 1993: Нажми на Газ (Hit The Gas)
- 1993: Сектор Газа (Gas Sector or Gaza Strip)
- 1994: Танцы после Порева (Dancing after Sex)
- 1994: Кащей Бессмертный (Kashchey The Immortal)
- 1996: Газовая Атака (Gas Attack)
- 1997: Наркологический Университет Миллионов (Narcological University for Millions)
- 1997: Сектор Газа (Gas Sector or Gaza Strip) [Re-recording]
- 2000: Восставший из Ада (Hellraiser)

=== Compilations and remixes ===
- 1996: Избранное I (Best of I)
- 1996: Избранное II (Best of II)
- 1998: Баллады (Ballads)—contains calm rock ballads
- 1999: Extasy—Techno-style remixes by Aleksey Bryantsev (DJ Krot)
- 1999: Extasy 2—Techno-style remixes by Aleksey Bryantsev (DJ Krot)
- 2000: Лучшее (Best)
- 2002: Избранное III (Best of III)
- 2003: Баллады II (Ballads II)
- 2004: Баллады: Полная версия (Ballads: full version)
- 2015: Вой на Луну (Howl at the Moon)

=== Vinyl releases ===
- 1991: Колхозный панк (Kolkhoz Punk)
- 1993: Нажми на газ (Hit The Gas)
- 2016: Вой на луну (Howl at the Moon)
- 2023: Наркологический университет миллионов (Narcological University for Millions)
- 2024: Гуляй, мужик! (Make Merry, Man!)

== Music videos ==
- 1992: Колхозный панк (Kolhoz Punk)
- 1993: Лирика (Lyric)
- 1996: Туман (Fog)
- 1999: Пора домой (Time to go home)
- 2000: Ночь страха (Fright Night) [completed by the fans in 2013]

== Band members ==
- Yuri "Khoy" Klinskikh – vocal, texts, music – 1987–2000
- Oleg Kryuchkov – drums – 1988–1990
- Semen Titievsky – bass – 1988–1991
- Igor Kuschev – guitar – 1989–1991
- Sergei Tupikin – guitar, bass – 1989–1993
- Aleksey Ushakov – keyboards – 1989–1995
- Alexandr Yakushev – drums – 1989–1998
- Tatiana Fateeva – vocal – 1990–1993
- Vladimir Lobanov – guitar (on concerts only) – 1991–1993
- Igor "Egor" Zhirnov (Chernyi obelisk, Rondo) – guitar (on albums only) 1991–2000
- Vitaly Suchkov – bass (on concerts only) – 1993
- Vadim Gluhov – guitar (on concerts only) – 1993–2000
- Irina Puhonina – vocal (on albums only) – 1994, 1996
- Vasily Chernykh – guitar (on concerts only) – 1995–1998
- Igor Anikeev – keyboards – 1995–2000
- Elbrus Cherkezov – bass (on album only) – 1997
- Valery Podzorov – bass (on concerts only) – 1997–1998
- Veronika Nekiforova – vocal (on album only) – 1998
- Vasily Dronov – bass (on album only) – 2000

== See also ==
- Yuri Klinskikh
- Krasnaya Plesen
