= David Salomon (author) =

- Writing career
- Genres: Children's, non-fiction
- Subjects: Penguins, artists
- Website: www.davidsalphotography.com

David Salomon is an author and photographer living in Dallas, Texas, US. Salomon is from Israel, and served in the Golani Brigade in the IDF from 1970 to 1974. In 1974 Salomon moved to Brooklyn, New York.

Brown Books Publishing Group published Salomon's Penguin-Pedia: Photographs and Facts from One Man's Search for the Penguins of the World in 2011. Penguin-Pedia pairs research on all seventeen penguin species with Salomon's own photographs of each species in the wild.

In 2014 Salomon published Igor Samsonov: Painter and Passionate Visionary, a monograph of the Russian painter Igor Samsonov.

Random House published a book written by Salomon in the fall of 2017. The book is titled Penguins! and is part of their Step into Reading series for children. In 2019, Random House published a second children's book by Salomon titled "Baby Panda Goes Wild!"

David Salomon opened an art gallery in Dallas, Texas named O.R.D.A. Gallery in February 2017.

In September 2019, the Museum of Biblical Art (Dallas) hosted an exhibit of photos by Salomon showcasing Israeli national parks. Salomon's showing was next to an Andy Warhol exhibit.
