= Aleksandr Kokorev =

Russian footballer

Personal information
- Full name: Aleksandr Sergeyevich Kokorev
- Date of birth: 10 February 1984 (age 42)
- Place of birth: Voronezh, Russian SFSR
- Height: 1.87 m (6 ft 1 1/2 in)
- Position: Forward

Youth career
- DYuSShOR-15 Voronezh
- FC Fakel Voronezh

Senior career*
Years	Team	Apps	(Gls)
2003	FC Baltika-Tarko Kaliningrad (amateur)		
2006	FC Fakel-Strela Voronezh		
2006	FC Fakel Voronezh	4	(0)
2007	FC Lokomotiv Liski	10	(0)
2007	FC Oryol (amateur)		
2008	FC Fakel-StroyArt Voronezh (amateur)		
2009	FC FSA Voronezh	21	(2)
2010	FC Khimik Novomoskovsk (amateur)		
2011–2012	FC Khimik Rossosh		
2013	FC Akademiya Futbola Tambov Oblast		
- * Club domestic league appearances and goals

Aleksandr Sergeyevich Kokorev (Russian: Александр Серге́евич Кокорев; born 10 February 1984) is a former Russian professional football player.

== Club career ==
He played in the Russian Football National League for FC Fakel Voronezh in 2006.
