= Aleksandr Palchikov =

Russian footballer

Personal information
- Full name: Aleksandr Pavlovich Palchikov
- Date of birth: 23 October 1979 (age 47)
- Place of birth: Voronezh, Russian SFSR
- Height: 1.78 m (5 ft 10 in)
- Positions: Midfielder; forward

Senior career*
Years	Team	Apps	(Gls)
1996	FC Uralan-d Elista	10	(0)
2000–2001	FC Lokomotiv Liski	60	(2)
2003	FC Fakel-Voronezh Voronezh	5	(1)
2005	FC Dynamo Voronezh (D4)		
2006	FC Fakel Voronezh	29	(0)
2007–2008	FC Gubkin	23	(1)
2008	FC Lokomotiv Liski	15	(0)
2009	FC Fakel Voronezh	14	(0)
- * Club domestic league appearances and goals

Aleksandr Pavlovich Palchikov (Russian: Александр Павлович Пальчиков; born 23 October 1979) is a former Russian professional football player who played as a striking midfielder.

== Club career ==
He played two seasons in the Russian Football National League for FC Fakel Voronezh.
