= Igor Samsonov =

Igor Samsonov is a contemporary painter born in Voronezh, Russia, on January 7, 1963 his paintings have been in exhibitions in Russia, Europe, and the U.S. He is known to have his own modern take on Classical Realism while also being influenced by Renaissance, Dutch Renaissance, and Post-Impressionist artists.

== Career ==
Samsonov initially decided on a career in mathematics and earned the equivalent of a Master's degree from Voronezh State University. He accepted a job with the Institute of Research but found himself more and more drawn back to art, especially after viewing some of Van Gogh's paintings at the Hermitage Museum in Leningrad (now St. Petersburg). In 1990 Samsonov moved to Leningrad, where he studied at the Ilya Repin Leningrad Institute for Painting, Sculpture and Architecture and was a student of Oleg Eremeev. He graduated from Repin in 1997, with a degree considered comparable to Doctorate of Fine Art under the Soviet system.

A monograph of Samsonov's work titled Igor Samsonov: Painter and Passionate Visionary was written and published by American author David Salomon in 2014.
