= Igor Bragin =

Russian footballer

Personal information
- Full name: Igor Alekseyevich Bragin
- Date of birth: 25 June 1965 (age 61)
- Place of birth: Voronezh, Russian SFSR
- Positions: Midfielder; defender

Youth career
- FC Fakel Voronezh

Senior career*
Years	Team	Apps	(Gls)
1982–1983	FC Fakel Voronezh	0	(0)
1984	FC Sever Murmansk	25	(0)
1984–1985	FC Fakel Voronezh	0	(0)
1986–1987	FC Buran Voronezh		
1988–1989	FC Baltika Kaliningrad	72	(0)
1989–1990	FC Buran Voronezh	31	(4)
1991	FC Spartak Tambov	40	(2)
1992	FC Khimik Uvarovo (amateur)		
1992–1993	SV Darmstadt 98	20	(0)
1993–1994	SV 98 Schwetzingen		
1994	FC Lokomotiv Liski (amateur)		
1995	FC Lokomotiv Liski	5	(0)
1996	FC Rassvet Troitskoye (amateur)		
1997	FC Gazovik Ostrogozhsk		
1998	FC Dynamo Semiluki		
- * Club domestic league appearances and goals

Igor Alekseyevich Bragin (Russian: Игорь Алексеевич Брагин; born 25 June 1965) is a retired Russian professional footballer.
