= Alexander Krysanov =

Russian ice hockey player

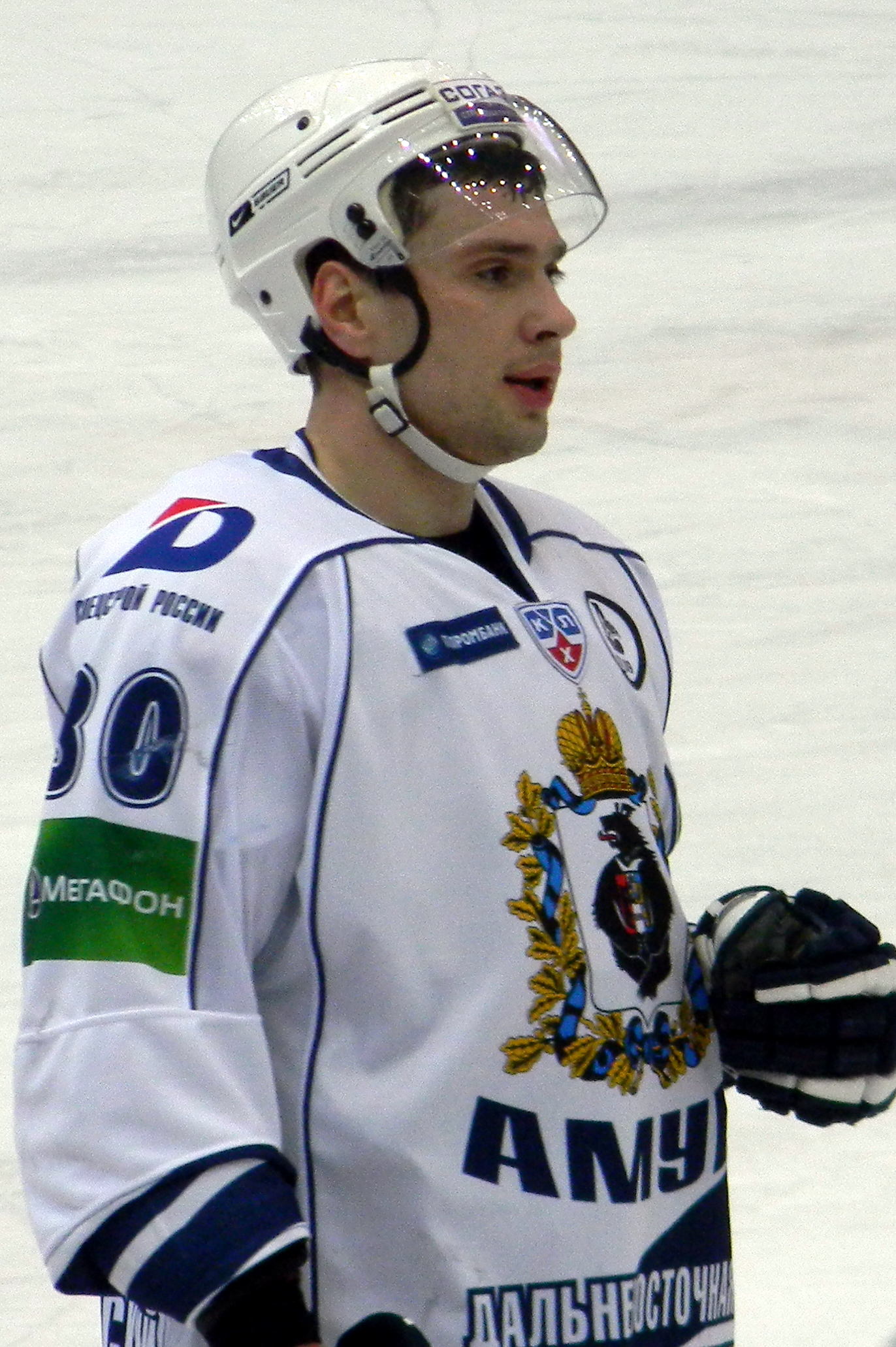
- Born: 2 January 1981 (age 45) Voronezh, Russian SFSR
- Height: 6 ft 0 in (183 cm)
- Weight: 207 lb (94 kg; 14 st 11 lb)
- Position: Right wing
- Shot: Left
- Played for: Amur Khabarovsk; HC CSKA Moscow; Torpedo Nizhny Novgorod
- Playing career: 2000–2013

Alexander Krysanov (born 2 January 1981) is a Russian retired professional ice hockey forward who played for Amur Khabarovsk in the Kontinental Hockey League.
