= David S. Salomon =

American medical researcher

David S. Salomon (born 1947) is a cancer research scientist and co-discoverer of the Cripto-1 gene. His areas of research include stem cells, cell signaling, breast cancer, mammary gland development, small molecule inhibitors, and embryonic development.

== Life ==
Salomon was born in 1947 in Tarrytown, New York. He graduated from Hackley School in Tarrytown, Clark University in Worcester, Massachusetts, and obtained his Ph.D. from State University of New York at Albany. He was a postdoctoral fellow at the Roche Institute of Molecular Biology in Nutley, New Jersey, and spent six years as a staff fellow in the Laboratory of Developmental Biology in the National Institute of Dental Research.

By 1999, he was head of the Tumor Growth Factor Section of the Center for Cancer Research at the National Cancer Institute. Currently, Scientist Emeritus at the Tumor Growth Factor Section, he has been studying the interaction of growth factors and oncogenes in the etiology of breast and colon cancer.
