= Bobrov, Bobrovsky District, Voronezh Oblast =

Bobrov Бобров
- Town
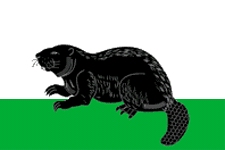
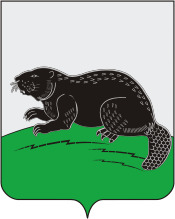
- Flag Coat of arms
- Interactive map of Bobrov
- Location of Bobrov Bobrov (Voronezh Oblast)
- Coordinates: 51°06′N 40°02′E
- Country: Russia
- Federal subject: Voronezh Oblast
- Administrative district: Bobrovsky District
- Urban settlementSelsoviet: Bobrov
- Founded: 1698
- Town status since: 1779
- Elevation: 150 m (490 ft)

Population (2010 Census)
  - Total: 19,738
  - Estimate (2025): 20,413 (+3.4%)

Administrative status
  - Capital of: Bobrovsky District, Bobrov Urban Settlement

Municipal status
  - Municipal district: Bobrovsky Municipal District
  - Urban settlement: Bobrov Urban Settlement
  - Capital of: Bobrovsky Municipal District, Bobrov Urban Settlement
- Time zone: UTC+3 (MSK)
- Postal codes: 397700–397706, 397759
- OKTMO ID: 20604101001
- Website: bobrovcity.ru

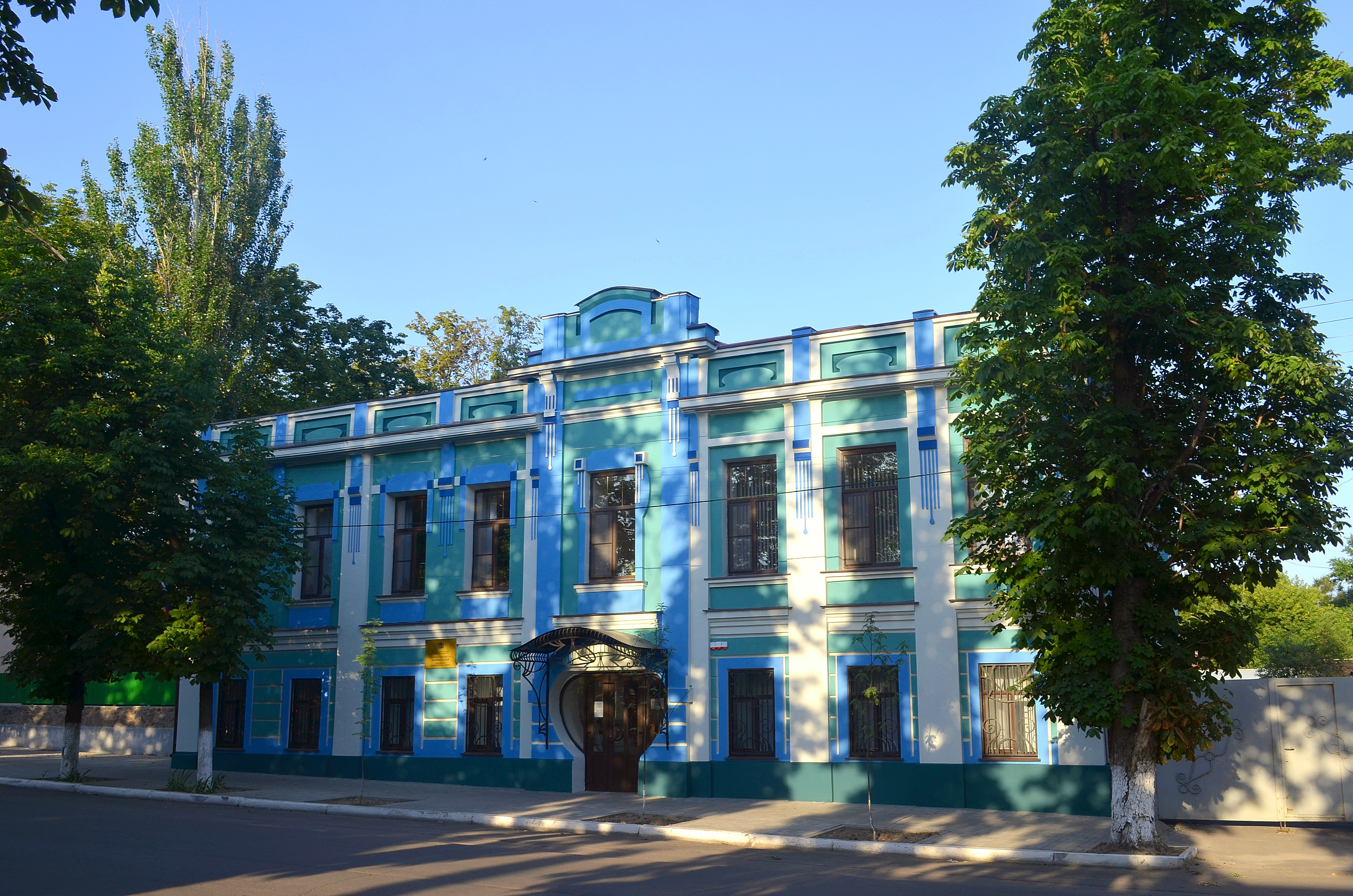

Bobrov (Russian: Бобро́в) is a town and the administrative center of Bobrovsky District in central Voronezh Oblast, Russia, located on the right bank of the Bityug River, 148 kilometers (92 mi) southeast of Voronezh, the administrative center of the oblast. Population: 20,871 (2021 census); 19,738 (2010 census); 20,806 (2002 census); 21,258 (1989 Soviet census). It was previously known as Bobrovskaya Sloboda (until 1779).

Those shot in the Great Terror were reburied in a nearby quarry in the 1960s. A memorial was added in 2002 and children of the victims asked to be buried near their parents when a graveyard developed there.

== History ==
It was established in 1698 as Bobrovskaya Sloboda (Бобро́вская слобода́) and was granted town status and given its present name in 1779.

== Administrative and municipal status ==
Within the framework of administrative divisions, Bobrov serves as the administrative center of Bobrovsky District. As an administrative division, it is, together with three rural localities in Bobrovsky District, incorporated within Bobrovsky District as Bobrov Urban Settlement. As a municipal division, this administrative unit also has urban settlement status and is a part of Bobrovsky Municipal District.

== Transportation ==
Bobrov is also a railway station on the Povorino-Liski branch.

== Notable people ==
- Vladimir Patkin (1945), Olympic volleyball player
- Pawel Kassatkin (1915–1987), Russian writer
