= Bobrovsky District =

Bobrovsky District Бобровский район (Russian)
- District
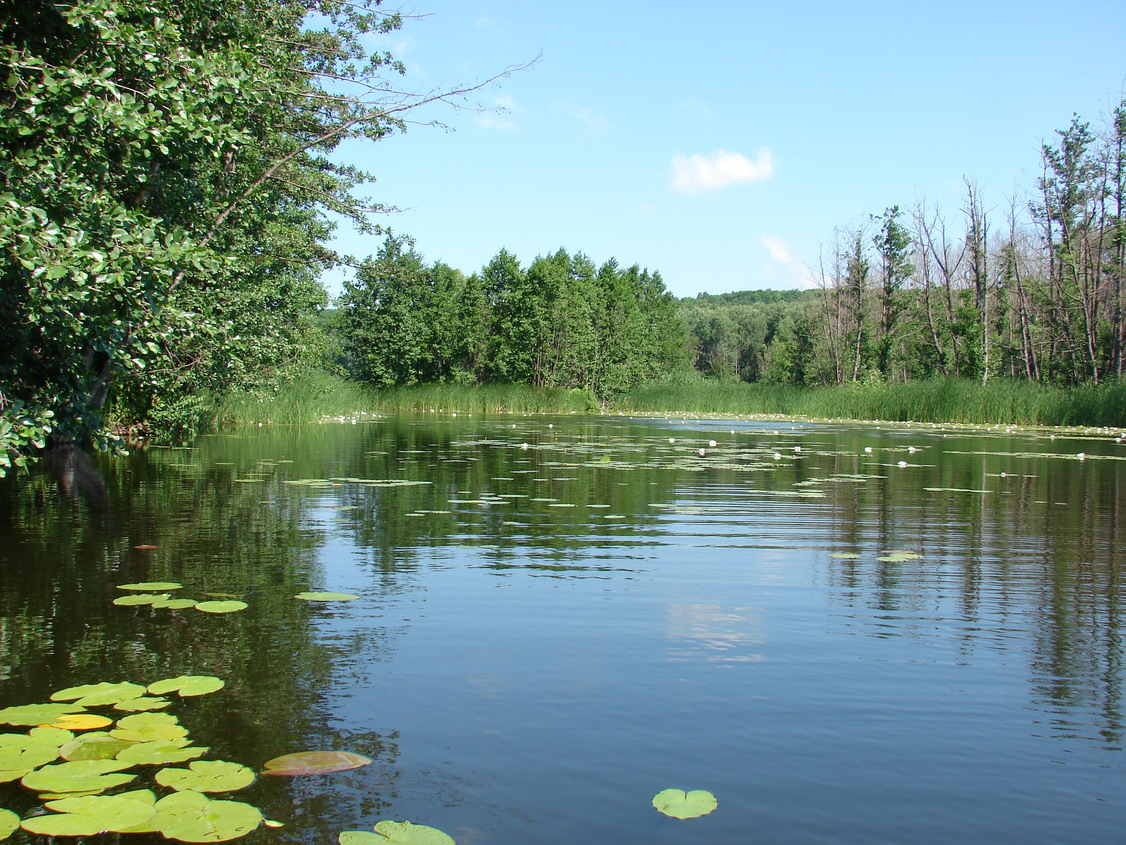
- The Bityug River flows through Bobrovsky District

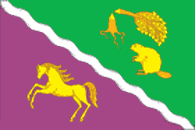
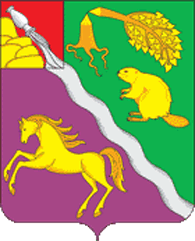
- Flag Coat of arms
- Location of Bobrovsky District in Voronezh Oblast
- Coordinates: 51°06′12″N 40°02′00″E
- Country: Russia
- Federal subject: Voronezh Oblast
- Established: 30 July 1928
- Administrative center: Bobrov

Area
  - Total: 2,233 km^{2} (862 sq mi)

Population (2010 Census)
  - Total: 49,494
  - Density: 22.16/km^{2} (57.41/sq mi)
  - Urban: 39.9%
  - Rural: 60.1%

Administrative structure
  - Administrative divisions: 1 Urban settlements, 18 Rural settlements
  - Inhabited localities: 1 cities/towns, 55 rural localities

Municipal structure
  - Municipally incorporated as: Bobrovsky Municipal District
  - Municipal divisions: 1 urban settlements, 18 rural settlements
- Time zone: UTC+3 (MSK)
- OKTMO ID: 20604000
- Website: http://adm-bobrov.ru/

Bobrovsky District (Russian: Бобро́вский райо́н) is an administrative and municipal district (raion), one of the thirty-two in Voronezh Oblast, Russia. It is located in the center of the oblast. The area of the district is 2,233 square kilometers (862 sq mi). Its administrative center is the town of Bobrov. Population: 49,371 (2021 census); 49,494 (2010 census); 54,162 (2002 census); 58,650 (1989 Soviet census). The population of Bobrov accounts for 42.3% of the district's total population.
