= PFC CSKA Moscow =

Russian professional football club

CSKA Moscow
- Full name: Профессиональный футбольный клуб ЦСКА
- Nicknames: Koni (Horses); Krasno-sinie (Red-blues); Armeitsy (Army Men)
- Founded: 27 August 1911; 115 years ago
- Ground: VEB Arena
- Capacity: 30,457
- Owner: VEB.RF
- President: Evgeniy Giner
- Manager: Dmitriy Igdisamov
- League: Russian Premier League
- 2025–26: Russian Premier League, 5th of 16
- Website: pfc-cska.com
Home colours	Away colours	Third colours

Professional Football Club CSKA (Russian: Профессиональный футбольный клуб ЦСКА, derived from the historical name 'Центральный спортивный клуб армии', English: Central Sports Club of the Army), commonly referred to as CSKA Moscow or CSKA Moskva outside of Russia, or simply as CSKA (pronounced [tsɛ ɛs ˈka]), is a Russian professional football club. It is based in Moscow, playing its home matches at the 30,000-capacity VEB Arena. It plays in red and blue colours, with various plain and striped patterns having been used.

Founded in 1911, CSKA is one of the oldest football clubs in Russia and it had its most successful period after World War II with five titles in six seasons. It won a total of 7 Soviet Top League championships and 5 Soviet Cups, including the double in the last season in 1991. The club has also won 6 Russian Premier League titles as well as 8 Russian Cups.

CSKA Moscow became the first club in Russia to win one of the European cup competitions, the UEFA Cup, after defeating Sporting CP in the final in Lisbon in 2005.

CSKA was the official team of the Soviet Army during the communist era. Since the dissolution of the Soviet Union it has become privately owned. In 2012, the Ministry of Defence sold all of its shares (24,94%) to Bluecastle Enterprises Ltd, (Note: In 1991, MacAsyng Holding BV was registered at the same address as RijnHove Groep's Amsterdam offices which is a law firm established in 1989 with offices in the Netherlands, Belgium, the British Virgin Islands (BVI), Curaçao, and Bonaire specializing in trust and fiduciary services, [accounting outsourcing|Accounting outsourcing], and tax consulting. MacAsyng Holding has Alexander Rene Garez as its director, who was born in 1968, lives in Paris, and shares the same telephone number as the Moscow law firm "Sieberg Shtabright Garez". Alexander Garez has represented the British firm Bluecastle Enterprises Ltd since 5 October 2000 and Parkhage BV since 14 November 2002.) a conglomerate owning 100% of the club since then. On 13 December 2019, state-owned development corporation VEB.RF announced they will take control of over 75% of club shares that were used as collateral by previous owners for the VEB Arena financing. Russian businessman Roman Abramovich's Sibneft corporation was a leading sponsor of the club from 2004 to 2006.

== History ==
=== Names ===
CSKA Moscow was founded in 1911 and, like many clubs in the former Soviet Union, has seen a number of name changes. From 1928 to 1950 the association was called CDKA Moscow (ЦДКА Москва). In 1951 its name was changed to CDSA Moscow (ЦДСА Москва). In 1957 the sports society was renamed again into CSK MO Moscow (ЦСК МО Москва). The current name of club's football department, PFC CSKA Moscow (ПФК ЦСКА Москва) has been used since 1994.

- 1911–22: Amateur Society of Skiing Sports (OLLS Moscow) (Russian: Общество Любителей Лыжного Спорта)
- 1923: Experimental & Demonstrational Playground of Military Education Association (OPPV) (Russian: Опытно-Показательная Площадка Всеобуча)
- 1924–27: Experimental & Demonstrational Playground of Military Administration (OPPV) (Russian: Опытно-Показательная Площадка Военведа)
- 1928–50: Sports Club of Central House of the Red Army (CDKA) (Russian: Спортивный Клуб Центрального Дома Красной Армии)
- 1951–56: Sports Club of Central House of the Soviet Army (CDSA) (Russian: Спортивный Клуб Центрального Дома Советской Армии)
- 1957–59: Central Sports Club of the Ministry of Defense (CSK MO) (Russian: Центральный Спортивный Клуб Министерства Обороны)
- 1960–: Central Sports Club of Army (CSKA) (Russian: Центральный Спортивный Клуб Армии)

=== Foundation and first successes ===
The history of CSKA football club began in 1911, when a football section was organized in the Amateur Society of Skiing Sports (OLLS).

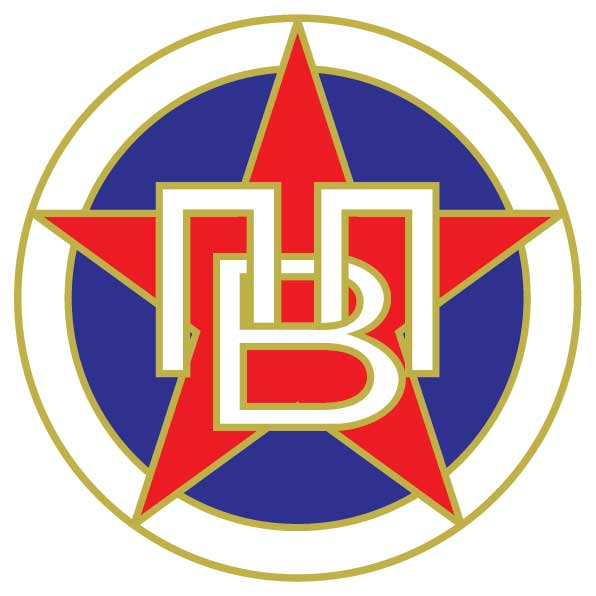
OPPV emblem

After the 1917 season, part of the reserve OLLS team moved to the first. In 1921, the champion of the autumn Moscow championship (winner of Fulda Cup) was determined in the final match, in which teams OLLS and KFS took part. The KFS team won 6:0. In the 1922 season, OLLS players won the spring Moscow championship and took second place in the fall championship. In the same year, OLLS won KFS-Kolomyagi Cup, in the final of which, according to the regulations, the winners of the first and second leagues of the Moscow championship met, and Tosmen Cup, where the champions of Moscow and Petrograd met.

=== Soviet period ===
==== Until 1970: Peaks and troughs ====
The club had its most successful period immediately after the end of the Second World War. At this time, one of the best players in its history and the best scorer in the history of the team, Grigory Fedotov, played for the club. The army men were runners-up in the first edition of the resumed Vysschaya Liga in 1945.

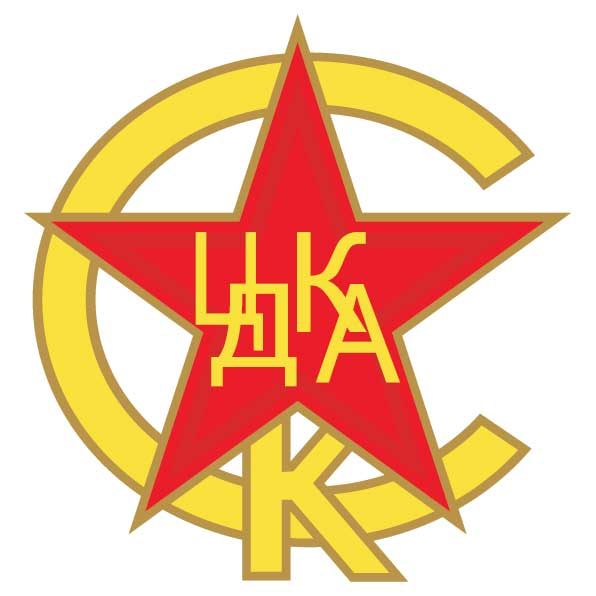
CDKA emblem

Three consecutive championship titles followed for the first time in league history, including club's first double in 1948. This year the army team won their second USSR Cup. In the semifinals, as a result of a replay, CDKA snatched victory from Dynamo Moscow, and in the final they defeated the current cup holders, Spartak. By that time the main army team became dubbed as the "Team of Lieutenants" (Russian: «Команда Лейтенантов»). After finishing second in 1949, in 1950, the army team became champions again, and in 1951, playing under the new name CDSA (Central House of the Soviet Army), they won a double again, winning both the championship and the cup. The history of the football department from this time is closely linked to the ice hockey department of the club, HC CSKA Moscow, because the leading players like Vsevolod Bobrov played both sports in parallel.

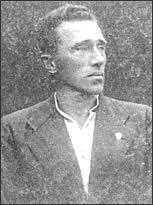
Boris Arkadyev, CDKA coach

After successful times Olympic Games 1952 in Helsinki marked the beginning of the decline of CDSA Moscow. The club's players formed the core of the national team, which, after tough negotiations, joined FIFA shortly before the Olympic football tournament. Boris Arkadiev became the coach of both the national team and the army club. The first meeting between the Soviet Union and Yugoslavia in football is still amongst the most famous matches. On the political level, the Soviet leader Joseph Stalin and the Yugoslav leader Josip Tito split in 1948, which resulted in Yugoslavia being excluded from the Communist Information Bureau. Before the match, both Tito and Stalin sent telegrams to their national teams, which showed just how important it was for the two head of states. Yugoslavia led 5–1, but a Soviet comeback in the last 15 minutes resulted in a 5–5 draw. The match was replayed, Yugoslavia winning 3–1. The defeat to the archrivals hit Soviet football hard, especially CDSA and its players. After just three games played in the season, CDSA was forced to withdraw from the league and later disbanded. Furthermore, Boris Arkadiev was stripped of his Merited Master of Sports of the USSR title. For intelligence chief Lavrentiy Beria, the Olympic elimination was the perfect opportunity to eliminate the successful city rival. As head of the KGB, he was also honorary president of Dynamo Moscow - the main rival of CDSA.

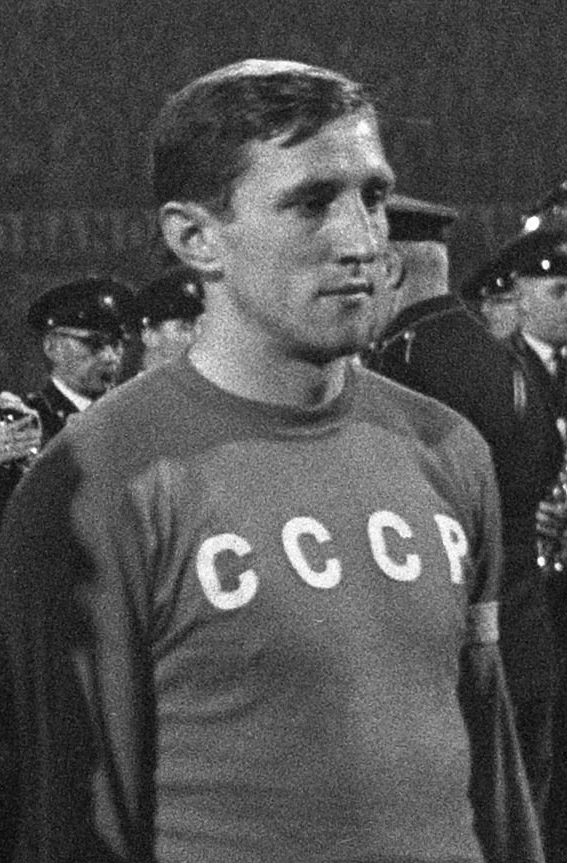
Albert Shesternyov, one of the best Soviet players and CDSA captain

After two seasons of oblivion and after Stalin's death in the spring of 1953 CDSA Moscow was re-established in 1954 on the initiative of then Soviet Defense Minister Nikolai Bulganin. Shortly thereafter, the team won the Soviet Cup in 1955, defeating Dynamo Moscow in the final with the legendary goalkeeper Lev Yashin being sent off. The fans had to wait 15 years for the next trophy. In 1970 season, CSKA became Soviet champions for the sixth time, gaining the same number of points with Dynamo. The first gold match held on December 5, 1970 in Tashkent, Uzbek SSR ended without goals. The next day CSKA won the second match against Dynamo 4:3 after 1:3 deficit. By winning the championship, CSKA qualified for the first round of the European Cup. CSKA defeated Turkish club Galatasaray in the first round, but lost to Belgian champion Standard Liège in the second round and was eliminated from the tournament.

==== 1971 to 1991: Two decades drought ====
With only 19 points out of a possible 68 in the 1984 season, the club had to endure the first ever relegation to the second division, where CSKA spent two seasons. After returning to the Higher league, the club did not manage to stay in it for a long time, and in the 1987 season, a second relegation followed. Nevertheless CSKA was able to fight its way back after two seasons in the First League, immediately secured the runner-up and even won the last edition of the football championship of the Soviet Union in the 1991 season. Having also won the Soviet cup, the club thus secured the last golden double in the history of the USSR football. With the championship title from the 1991 season, CSKA Moscow qualified for the first round of the 1992–93 UEFA Champions League, where they defeated the Icelandic team Víkingur Reykjavík. In the second round the Spanish top club Barcelona with coach Johan Cruyff was defeated. The opponents in Group A were the current Champions League winners Olympique Marseille, Glasgow Rangers and Club Brugge. CSKA was unable to build on the results of the matches with Barcelona, becoming the fourth in the group with two draws and four defeats, and was eliminated from the tournament.

=== Modern period ===
==== 1992 to 2004: Back to the top ====
CSKA Moscow was one of the founding members of the newly formed Russian Top Division after the dissolution of the Soviet Union. In the first six seasons, the team occupied the places in the middle of the table. In the 1998 season, the club was runner-up and in the next season finished third. In the following two seasons, CSKA Moscow again occupied places in the middle of the table. In the 2002 season, the team trained by Valery Gazzaev took second place again, winning the Russian Cup. In 2003, the team won its first championship in the history of the Russian Premier League. After that, the head coach Valery Gassayev was sacked surprisingly and the Portuguese coach Artur Jorge was signed as his successor. Under the new coach, the team could not build on the performances from the previous season. After falling to fifth place in July 2004, Arthur Jorge was sacked after only eight months at the helm of the club. After the return of Valery Gassaev, CSKA was able to save the season and become vice-champion.

==== 2005 to 2010: Golden years ====

The 2005 UEFA Cup Final starting lineup.

In the 2004 season, after qualifying for the UEFA Champions League, the team finished third at the group stage and therefore took part in the UEFA Cup play-off. The UEFA Cup for CSKA began with a home match against Portugal's Benfica in the round of 32, which ended in a 2-0 victory for CSKA, in the away match CSKA drew 1-1. The next rival of CSKA was the Serbian club Partizan, the away match in Belgrade ended with a score of 1-1, and the home match in Krasnodar - 2-0 in favor of the red-blue team. In the next round, the army team defeated the French side Auxerre 4-0. Despite the 2-0 away defeat, CSKA was able to continue playing in the UEFA Cup. In the semifinals, CSKA's opponent was the Italian side Parma, after beating which (0-0, 3-0), the Muscovites reached the final.

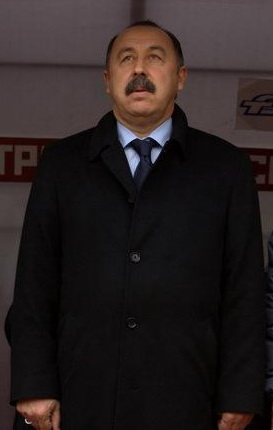
Valery Gazzaev, coach during the golden era of the club

Then, on May 18, 2005, the team became the first Russian team ever to win a European competition, the 2004-05 UEFA Cup at the José Alvalade Stadium in Lisbon, Portugal, winning Sporting 3-1. The team failed to consolidate their success, losing the UEFA Super Cup to English club Liverpool on 26 August 2005 at Stade Louis II, in Monaco. Nevertheless, this year, CSKA become the first Russian club to complete a treble after winning the second Russian championship title and the Russian Cup.

The team had qualified for the third qualifying round of the 2006–07 UEFA Champions League by winning the championship in 2005 and progressed to the group stage over MFK Ružomberok. At the group stage, CSKA finished in third place and qualified for the round of 32 in the UEFA Cup, but was eliminated there against the Israeli representative Maccabi Haifa. In the 2006 season, CSKA won domestic treble, as the team won all three national titles: the Premier League, the Russian Cup and the Russian Super Cup.

As Russian champions, CSKA qualified for the 2007–08 UEFA Champions League. At the group stage, CSKA finished fourth and last with just one draw out of five defeats and was eliminated. In the Premier League, CSKA occupied the third place, but won the Russian Super Cup.

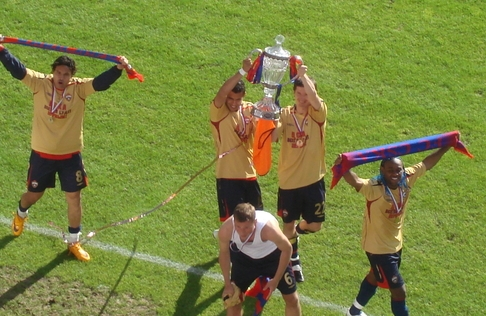
CSKA players celebrating their victory in the 2008 Russian Cup

In the first half of the 2008 season, CSKA played below expectations and even finished in seventh place at the break of the season. After the European Championship, Valery Gazzaev, who announced his retirement at the end of the season, switched the game tactics to four defenders and let the young Alan Dzagoev, who was considered one of the greatest talents in Russian football, show himself. As a result, CSKA ended its negative series and from then on showed effective football. But it was no longer enough to win the championship, and CSKA took the runner-up behind Rubin Kazan. In the 2008-09 UEFA Cup, CSKA was the only team to achieve twelve points from four group matches. Then the team advanced to the round of 16, where they were defeated by the eventual UEFA Cup winners Shakhtar Donetsk from Ukraine after a 1-0 home win and subsequent 0-2 away defeat. The team also won the Russian Cup for the fourth time.

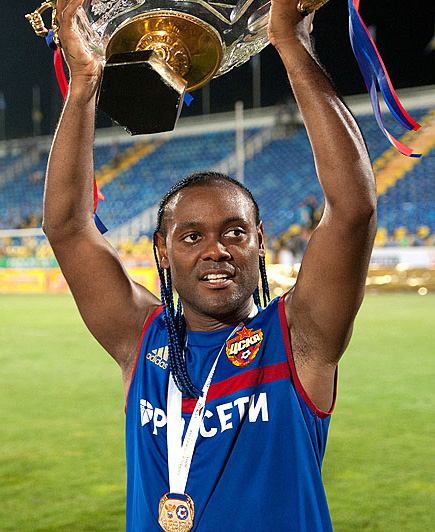
Vágner Love, holding the trophy after winning the 2013 Russian Super Cup

In January 2009, the Brazilian Zico took over the position of head coach at CSKA. After the half of the 2009 season, the club was only fourth. At the end of the 2009 season, fifth place was just enough for participation in the 2010-11 UEFA Europa League. As a result, the Brazilian head coach was dismissed in September 2009. In the same month, the Spaniard Juande Ramos was signed as his successor, but only lasted 47 days before being released on October 26 and replaced by Leonid Slutsky. The club won the Russian Supercup for the fourth time and became the Russian Cup winner for the fifth time. The team had also qualified for the quarter-finals of the Champions League for the first time after defeating Sevilla FC 3–2 on aggregate. They were later eliminated from competition by the eventual winners Inter Milan, losing by 1–0 scorelines in both Milan and Moscow.

==== Slutsky era ====
Leonid Slutsky was introduced as the new head coach in October 2009. In the 2010 Russian Premier League season, the team was runner-up. In the Russian Cup, the team was eliminated in the round of 32 against the second division Ural Ekaterinburg. In the Europa League, CSKA made it to the round of 16, where the team lost to the eventual winners Porto after two defeats (0-1 and 1-2).

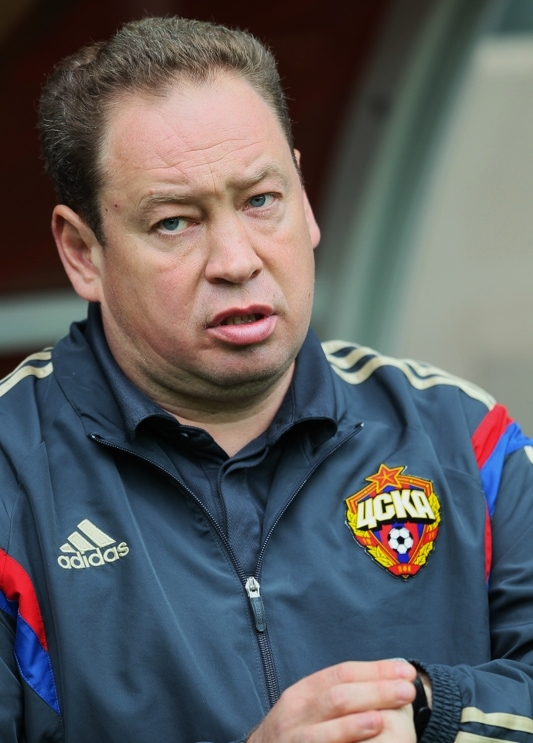
Leonid Slutsky

Finishing as the runners-up in the previous season, the club qualified for the group stage of the 2011–12 UEFA Champions League. The opponents in Group B were Inter Milan, Trabzonspor and Lille. On 7 December 2011, CSKA qualified for the knockout phase after winning crucial 3 points by defeating Inter Milan with scoreline 1–2 in Milan and finishing as the runners-up in the group behind the Milanese. In the round of 16 the team met Spanish top club Real Madrid, to which CSKA lost 2-5 on aggregate. In the 2011–12 Russian championship, CSKA could only reach third place despite finishing second after the first phase of the season. By the 100th anniversary of the club, CSKA could not leave its fans without a trophy and won its sixth Russian Cup, beating Alania Vladikavkaz in the final 2-1 on May 22, 2011.

In the 2012–13 season, CSKA took part in the play-off round of the 2012–13 UEFA Europa League, where they were eliminated against Swedish side AIK after 1-0 in Moscow and 0-2 in Stockholm. At the end of the season, however, CSKA were crowned the champions of Russia. It was the eleventh championship title in club history. The team won the Russian Cup and thus achieving a double.

As Russian champions CSKA took part in the 2013–14 UEFA Champions League. The club was eliminated from the competition after the group stage against Bayern Munich, Manchester City and Viktoria Plzeň with only one win and five defeats resulting in the fourth place. In the domestic League, however, the club celebrated the second championship title in a row after Zoran Tošić scored the decisive goal against Lokomotiv Moscow on the last Matchday of the season for the tenth victory in the league in a row.

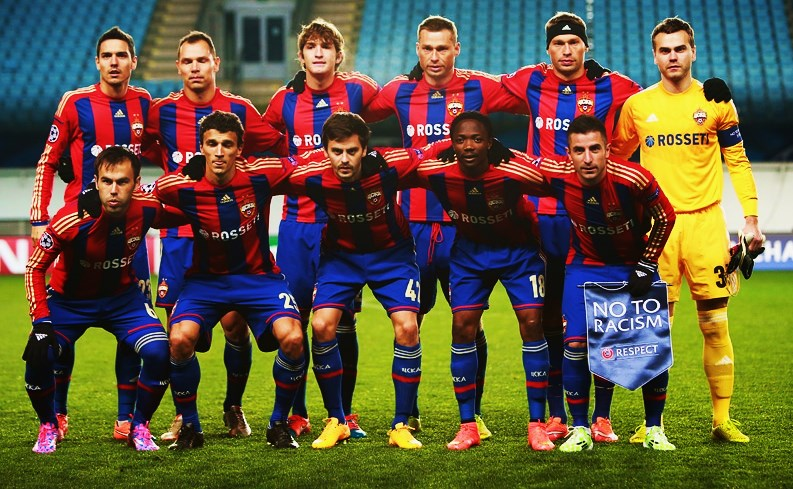
CSKA Moscow team in 2014 against Manchester City at a UEFA Champions League match

In the 2015–16 season, CSKA advanced to the Champions League group stage over Sparta Prague and Sporting. With PSV Eindhoven, Manchester United and Wolfsburg, CSKA completed Group B of the competition, but wasn't able to advance to the round of 16. In the Premier League, the club started with six consecutive wins, with the first four games being won without conceding a single goal. At the end of the season, the army club finished two points ahead of the second-placed Rostov and won its sixth Russian title (and 13th overall).

As a result, CSKA took part in the group stage of the 2016–17 UEFA Champions League. Opponents in Group E were Monaco, Bayer Leverkusen and Tottenham Hotspur. On 6 October 2016, during the group stage, Finland announced that Roman Eremenko had been handed a 30-day ban from football by UEFA, with UEFA announcing on 18 November 2016, that Eremenko had been handed a two-year ban from football due to testing positive for cocaine. Following the ban of one of the team leaders CSKA couldn't win a single game and was therefore eliminated from the tournament. After the last group game against Tottenham and after a negative run in the league, longtime head coach Leonid Slutsky left the club at his own request.

On 12 December, Viktor Goncharenko was announced as the club's new manager, signing a two-year contract.

==== Under Goncharenko ====
As CSKA finished second in the 2016–17 Premier League, they started their way in the 2017–18 UEFA Champions League from the third qualifying round, defeating AEK Athens there and then Young Boys in the play-off round. In Group A, the army club met Benfica, Manchester United and Basel and finished in third place. As a result, CSKA continued to play in the Europa League and advanced to the quarter-finals, losing to Arsenal.

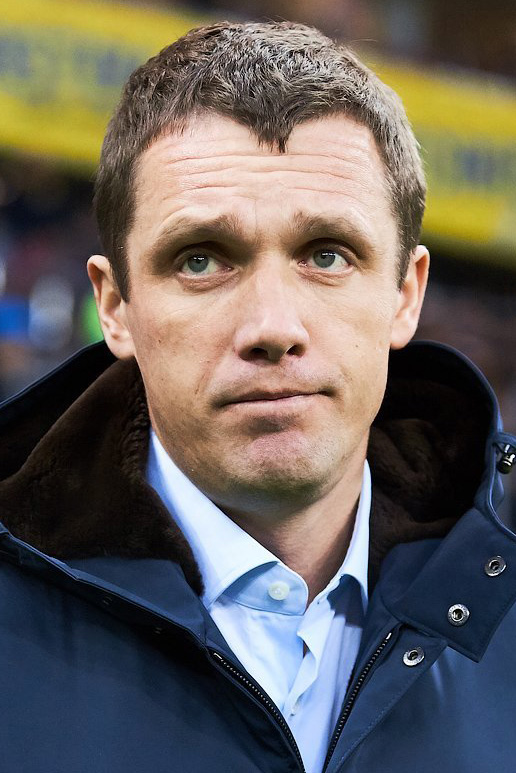
Viktor Goncharenko

On 21 July 2018, Goncharenko extended his contract until the end of the 2019/20 season. During the summer of 2018 CSKA lost many of its leaders: Aleksei and Vasili Berezutski and Sergei Ignashevich finished their careers as professional players; Alexandr Golovin was bought by AS Monaco; Pontus Wernbloom became a PAOK player and Bibras Natcho went to Olympiacos. However, at the start of that season CSKA showed good results, being at the top-three in Russian champions table and beating Real Madrid in Champions League group stage in both home and away matches (1–0 in Moscow and 3–0 in Madrid).

On 13 December 2019, state-owned development corporation VEB.RF announced they will take control of over 75% of club shares that were used as collateral by previous owners for the VEB Arena financing.

On 22 March 2021, Viktor Goncharenko left his role as head coach of CSKA Moscow by mutual consent.

==== Under Olić, Berezutski and Fedotov ====
On 23 March 2021, CSKA appointed their former striker Ivica Olić as their new head coach. After just nine games, culminating in a 6th place finish in the 2020–21 Russian Premier League, missing the European competitions for the first time in 20 years, Olić left CSKA by mutual consent on 15 June 2021 with Aleksei Berezutski being placed in temporary charge. On 19 July 2021, Berezutski was confirmed as CSKA's new permanent head coach.

In February 2022, CSKA were hit by sanctions from the United States Department of the Treasury as a consequence of the ongoing Russian invasion of Ukraine. CSKA is owned by Russian state-controlled VEB.RF and was sanctioned as its asset. In addition, the European Club Association suspended the team. CSKA won season-best 6 consecutive league games (last two before the winter break and the first four after), Berezutski was selected league's coach of the month for March 2022 and the club moved up to the 3rd position in the standings within 6 points of league-leading Zenit Saint Petersburg. However, CSKA won only twice in the remaining 8 games of the league season and finished in 5th place. On 15 June 2022, Berezutski left his role as head coach after his contract was terminated by mutual agreement, with Vladimir Fedotov being appointed as the clubs new head coach the same day. Fedotov led CSKA to the 2nd place in the 2022–23 Russian Premier League. CSKA also won the 2022–23 Russian Cup.

==== Under Nikolić ====
Marko Nikolić was appointed CSKA manager before the 2024–25 season. In the first season under Nikolić, CSKA finished third in the Russian Premier League and won the 2024–25 Russian Cup.

==== Under Celestini ====
On 22 June 2025, the club announced Swiss manager Fabio Celestini to be appointed head coach, signing a two-year contract with an option for a third year. The first competitive match under his coaching ended with CSKA winning the Russian Super Cup. The club remained in the top three of the 2025–26 Russian Premier League until the winter break, but after the season resumed it earned only 12 of a possible 30 points. Following a home defeat to FC Zenit, Celestini and the club announced termination of his contract by mutual consent.

==== Under Igdisamov ====
Dmitriy Igdisamov was in Celestini's coaching staff since 25 March 2026, after being head coach of CSKA's youth team 2023-2025. Following the termination of Celestini's contract on 4 May, Igdisamov was appointed as interim and then confirmed as head coach on 1 June 2026. Under Igdisamov CSKA remained unbeaten in first ten Russian Premier League matches.

== Stadium ==
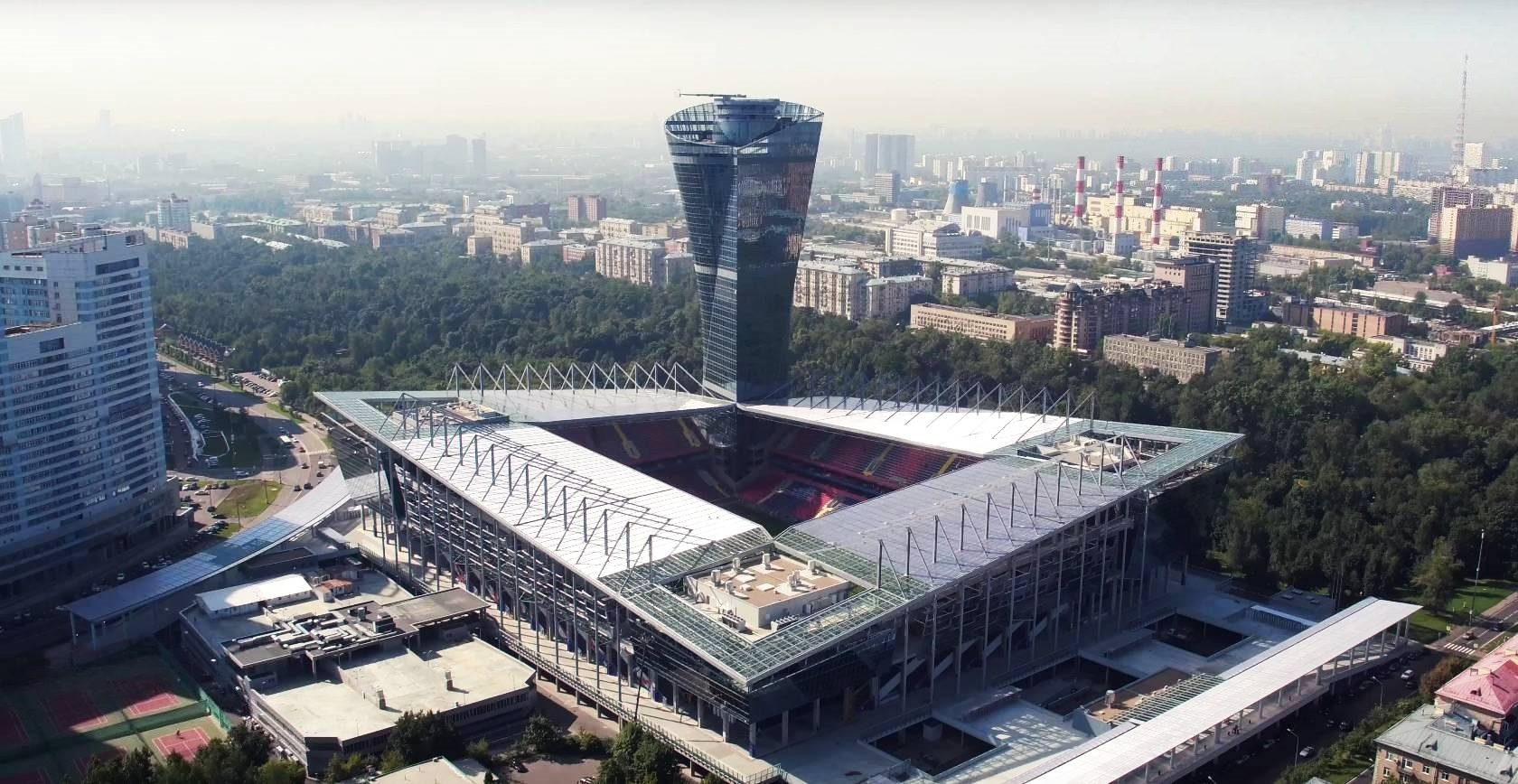
VEB Arena

CSKA had its own stadium called "Light-Athletic Football Complex CSKA" and abbreviated as LFK CSKA. Its capacity is very small for a club of its stature; no more than 4,600 spectators.

Between 1961 and 2000, CSKA played their home games at the Grigory Fedotov Stadium. In 2007, the Grigory Fedotov Stadium was demolished in 2007, and ground was broken on the club's new stadium Arena CSKA later the same year. During construction of their new stadium, CSKA played the majority of their games at the Arena Khimki and Luzhniki Stadium. After several delays in its construction, Arena CSKA was official opened on 10 September 2016.

On 28 February 2017, CSKA Moscow announced that they had sold the naming rights to the stadium to VEB.RF, with the stadium becoming the VEB Arena.

In 2018, CSKA decided to play its home UEFA Champions League matches at Luzhniki Stadium, instead of VEB Arena.

== Honours ==
=== Domestic ===
- Soviet Top League / Russian Premier League (First-tier)
  - Winners (13): 1946, 1947, 1948, 1950, 1951, 1970, 1991, 2003, 2005, 2006, 2012–13, 2013–14, 2015–16
  - Runners-up (13): 1938, 1945, 1949, 1990, 1998, 2002, 2004, 2008, 2010, 2014–15, 2016–17, 2017–18, 2022–23
- Soviet First League / Russian National Football League (Second-tier)
  - Winners: 1986, 1989
  - Runners-up: 1985
- Soviet Cup / Russian Cup
  - Winners (14): 1945, 1948, 1951, 1955, 1990–91, 2001–02, 2004–05, 2005–06, 2007–08, 2008–09, 2010–11, 2012–13, 2022–23, 2024–25
  - Runners-up (7): 1944, 1966–67, 1991–92, 1992–93, 1993–94, 1999–2000, 2015–16
- Soviet Super Cup / Russian Super Cup
  - Winners (8): 2004, 2006, 2007, 2009, 2013, 2014, 2018, 2025
  - Runners-up (5): 2003, 2010, 2011, 2016, 2023
- All-Union CPCS Tournament / USSR Federation Cup / Russian Premier League Cup
  - Winners: 1952

=== European ===
- UEFA Cup / UEFA Europa League
  - Winners: 2004–05
- UEFA Super Cup
  - Runners-up: 2005

=== Non-official ===
- Trofeo Villa de Gijón: 1

1994

- Channel One Cup: 1

2007

- Copa del Sol: 1

2010

- La Manga Cup: 1

2013

== League and Cup history ==
=== Soviet Union ===
Season	League									Soviet Cup	Europe		Other		Top scorer		Head coach
Season	Division	Pos	P	W	D	L	F	A	Pts	Soviet Cup	Competition	Result	Competition	Result	Name	Goals	Head coach
1936(s)	1st	4	6	2	1	3	13	18	11	-	-				Evgeny Shelagin	3	(Soviet Union) Pavel Khalkiopov
1936(a)	1st	8	7	2	0	5	9	20	11	R32	-				Ivan Mitronov; Nikolai Isaev	2	(Soviet Union) Pavel Khalkiopov
1937	1st	9	16	3	1	12	18	43	23	SF	-				Mikhail Kireev	5	(Soviet Union) Mikhail Rushchinsky
1938	1st	2	25	17	3	5	52	24	37	R64	-				(Soviet Union) Grigory Fedotov	20	(Soviet Union) Konstantin Zhiboedov
1939	1st	3	26	14	4	8	68	43	32	QF	-				(Soviet Union) Grigory Fedotov	21	(Soviet Union) Konstantin Zhiboedov
1940	1st	4	24	10	9	5	46	35	29	-	-				(Soviet Union) Grigory Fedotov	21	(Soviet Union) Sergei Bukhteev
1941	-																
1942	-																
1943	-																
1944	-									Runner-Up	-						(Soviet Union) Evgeny Nikishin (Soviet Union) Boris Arkadyev
1945	1st	2	22	18	3	1	69	23	39	Winner	-		-		(Soviet Union) Vsevolod Bobrov	24	(Soviet Union) Boris Arkadyev
1946	1st	1	22	17	3	2	55	13	37	QF	-		-		(Soviet Union) Valentin Nikolayev	16	(Soviet Union) Boris Arkadyev
1947	1st	1	24	17	6	1	61	16	40	SF	-		-		(Soviet Union) Valentin Nikolayev (Soviet Union) Vsevolod Bobrov	14	(Soviet Union) Boris Arkadyev
1948	1st	1	26	19	3	4	82	30	41	Winner	-		-		(Soviet Union) Vsevolod Bobrov	23	(Soviet Union) Boris Arkadyev
1949	1st	2	34	22	7	5	86	30	51	SF	-		-		(Soviet Union) Grigory Fedotov	18	(Soviet Union) Boris Arkadyev
1950	1st	1	36	20	13	3	91	31	53	SF	-		-		Boris Koverznev	21	(Soviet Union) Boris Arkadyev
1951	1st	1	28	18	7	3	53	19	43	Winner	-		-		(Soviet Union) Alexei Grinin (Soviet Union) Vyacheslav Solovyov	10	(Soviet Union) Boris Arkadyev
1952	-												LC	Winner	-		
1953	-																
1954	1st	6	24	8	8	8	30	29	24	QF	-		-		Viktor Fyodorov	6	(Soviet Union) Grigory Pinaichev
1955	1st	3	22	12	7	3	35	20	31	Winner	-		-		Valentin Yemyshev; Yuri Belyaev	8	(Soviet Union) Grigory Pinaichev
1956	1st	3	22	10	5	7	40	32	25	-	-		-		Yuri Belyaev	15	(Soviet Union) Grigory Pinaichev
1957	1st	5	22	12	2	8	51	31	27	SF	-		-		(Soviet Union) Vasily Buzunov	16	(Soviet Union) Grigory Pinaichev
1958	1st	3	22	9	9	4	40	25	27	R16	-		-		(Soviet Union) German Apukhtin	10	(Soviet Union) Boris Arkadyev
1959	1st	9	22	8	3	11	29	27	19	-	-		-		(Soviet Union) German Apukhtin	9	(Soviet Union) Boris Arkadyev
1960	1st	6	30	15	2	13	45	35	32	R16	-		-		Vladimir Streshniy	12	(Soviet Union) Grigory Pinaichev
1961	1st	4	30	16	6	8	61	43	38	R64	-		-		(Soviet Union) Alexei Mamykin	18	(Soviet Union) Konstantin Beskov
1962	1st	4	32	14	12	6	39	22	40	R32	-		-		(Soviet Union) Vladimir Fedotov	6	(Soviet Union) Konstantin Beskov
1963	1st	7	38	14	17	7	39	27	45	R32	-		-		(Soviet Union) Vladimir Fedotov	8	(Soviet Union) Vyacheslav Solovyov
1964	1st	3	32	16	11	5	49	23	43	QF	-		-		(Soviet Union) Vladimir Fedotov	16	(Soviet Union) Vyacheslav Solovyov (Soviet Union) Valentin Nikolayev
1965	1st	3	32	14	10	8	38	24	38	R16	-		-		Boris Kazakov	15	(Soviet Union) Valentin Nikolayev
1966	1st	5	36	16	9	11	60	45	41	R32	-		-		Boris Kazakov	15	(Soviet Union) Sergei Shaposhnikov
1967	1st	9	36	12	12	12	35	35	36	Runner-Up	-		-		Taras Shulyatitsky	6	(Soviet Union) Sergei Shaposhnikov (Soviet Union) Alexei Kalinin (Soviet Union) Vsevolod Bobrov
1968	1st	4	38	20	10	8	50	30	50	R16	-		-		(Soviet Union) Vladimir Polikarpov	10	(Soviet Union) Vsevolod Bobrov
1969	1st	6	32	13	11	8	25	18	37	SF	-		-		Berador Abduraimov	7	(Soviet Union) Vsevolod Bobrov
1970	1st	1	32	20	5	7	46	17	45	R16	-		-		(Soviet Union) Boris Kopeikin	15	(Soviet Union) Valentin Nikolayev
1971	1st	12	30	7	12	11	34	36	26	R16	EC	R2	-		(Soviet Union) Boris Kopeikin	8	(Soviet Union) Valentin Nikolayev
1972	1st	5	30	15	4	11	37	33	34	SF	-		-		(Soviet Union) Vladimir Polikarpov; Vladimir Dorofeev; Wilhelm Tellinger	6	(Soviet Union) Valentin Nikolayev
1973	1st	10	30	10	9	11	33	36	25	QF	-		-		Vladimir Dorofeev	9	(Soviet Union) Valentin Nikolayev
1974	1st	13	30	7	12	11	28	33	26	R16	-		-		(Soviet Union) Vladimir Fedotov; Yuri Smirnov	5	(Soviet Union) Vladimir Agapov
1975	1st	13	30	6	13	11	29	36	25	SF	-		-		(Soviet Union) Boris Kopeikin	13	(Soviet Union) Anatoly Tarasov
1976(s)	1st	7	15	5	5	5	20	16	15	-	-		-		(Soviet Union) Boris Kopeikin	6	(Soviet Union) Alexei Mamykin
1976(a)	1st	7	15	5	5	5	21	16	15	QF	-		-		(Soviet Union) Boris Kopeikin	8	(Soviet Union) Alexei Mamykin
1977	1st	14	30	5	17	8	28	39	27	R16	-		-		(Soviet Union) Yuri Chesnokov	12	(Soviet Union) Alexei Mamykin (Soviet Union) Vsevolod Bobrov
1978	1st	6	30	14	4	12	36	40	32	R16	-		-		Aleksei Belenkov	8	(Soviet Union) Vsevolod Bobrov
1979	1st	8	34	12	8	14	46	46	32	SF	-		-		(Soviet Union) Yuri Chesnokov	16	(Soviet Union) Sergei Shaposhnikov
1980	1st	5	34	13	12	9	36	32	36	R16	-		-		(Soviet Union) Alexandr Tarkhanov	14	(Soviet Union) Oleg Bazilevich
1981	1st	6	34	14	9	11	39	33	37	R16	UC	R1	-		(Soviet Union) Yuri Chesnokov	9	(Soviet Union) Oleg Bazilevich
1982	1st	15	34	10	9	15	41	46	29	Qualifying	-		-		(Soviet Union) Alexandr Tarkhanov	16	(Soviet Union) Oleg Bazilevich (Soviet Union) Albert Shesternev
1983	1st	12	34	11	12	11	37	33	32	SF	-		-		Viktor Kolyadko	13	(Soviet Union) Albert Shesternev
1984	1st	18	34	5	9	20	24	55	19	QF	-		-		Gennady Shtromberger	4	(Soviet Union) Yury Morozov
1985	2nd	2	42	21	14	7	81	37	56	QF	-		-		(Soviet Union) Valeri Shmarov	29	(Soviet Union) Yury Morozov
1986	2nd	1	47	27	9	11	65	35	63	R32	-		-		Sergei Berezin	19	(Soviet Union) Yury Morozov
1987	1st	15	30	7	11	12	26	35	24	R32	-		-		(Soviet Union) Vladimir Tatarchuk		(Soviet Union) Yury Morozov
1988	2nd	3	42	23	10	9	69	35	56	R16	-		-		(Soviet Union) Valery Masalitin	16	(Soviet Union) Sergei Shaposhnikov
1989	2nd	1	42	27	10	5	113	28	64	R128	-		-		(Soviet Union) Valery Masalitin	32	(Soviet Union) Pavel Sadyrin
1990	1st	2	24	13	5	6	43	26	31	SF	-		-		(Soviet Union) Valery Masalitin / (Soviet Union) Igor Korneev	8	(Soviet Union) Pavel Sadyrin
1991	1st	1	30	17	9	4	57	32	43	Winner	CWC	R1	-		(Soviet Union) Dmitri Kuznetsov	12	(Soviet Union) Pavel Sadyrin

=== Russia ===
Season	League									Russian Cup	Europe		Other		Top scorer		Head coach
Season	Division	Pos	P	W	D	L	F	A	Pts	Russian Cup	Competition	Result	Competition	Result	Name	Goals	Head coach
1992	Top League	5	26	13	7	6	46	29	33	Runner-Up	CL	GS	-		(Russia) Alexandr Grishin	10	(Russia) Pavel Sadyrin (Russia) Gennadi Kostylev
1993	Top League	9	34	12	6	16	43	45	42	Runner-Up	-		-		(Russia) Ilshat Fayzulin (Russia) Oleg Sergeyev	8	(Russia) Gennadi Kostylev (Russia) Boris Kopeikin
1994	Top League	10	30	8	10	12	30	32	26	Runner-Up	CWC	1R	-		(Russia) Ilshat Fayzulin (Russia) Oleg Sergeyev	5	(Russia) Boris Kopeikin (Russia) Alexandr Tarkhanov
1995	Top League	6	30	16	5	9	56	34	53	Round of 16	-		-		(Russia) Dmitry Karsakov	10	(Russia) Alexandr Tarkhanov
1996	Top League	5	34	20	6	8	58	35	66	Quarter-finals	UC	1R	-		(Russia) Dmitry Khokhlov (Russia) Aleksei Gerasimov	10	(Russia) Alexandr Tarkhanov
1997	Top League	12	34	11	9	14	31	42	42	Round of 16	-		-		(Russia) Vladimir Kulik	9	(Russia) Pavel Sadyrin
1998	Top League	2	30	17	5	8	50	22	56	Quarter-finals	-		-		(Russia) Vladimir Kulik	14	(Russia) Pavel Sadyrin (Russia) Oleg Dolmatov
1999	Top League	3	30	15	10	5	56	29	55	Semi-finals	CL	2QR	-		(Russia) Vladimir Kulik	14	(Russia) Oleg Dolmatov
2000	Top League	8	30	12	5	13	45	39	41	Runner-Up	UC	1R	-		(Russia) Vladimir Kulik	10	(Russia) Oleg Dolmatov (Russia) Pavel Sadyrin
2001	Top League	7	30	12	11	7	39	30	47	Round of 16	-		-		(Serbia) Predrag Ranđelović	8	(Russia) Pavel Sadyrin (Russia) Aleksandr Kuznetsov
2002	Premier League	2	30	21	3	6	60	27	66	Winner	UC	1R	-		(Russia) Rolan Gusev (Russia) Dmitry Kirichenko	15	(Russia) Valery Gazzaev
2003	Premier League	1	30	17	8	5	56	32	59	Round of 32	CL	2QR	RSC	Runner-Up	(Russia) Rolan Gusev	9	(Russia) Valery Gazzaev
2004	Premier League	2	30	17	9	4	53	22	60	Quarter-finals	CL	GS	RSC	Winner	(Croatia) Ivica Olić (Brazil) Vágner Love (Russia) Dmitry Kirichenko	9	(Portugal) Artur Jorge (Russia) Valery Gazzaev
2005	Premier League	1	30	18	8	4	48	20	62	Winner	UC; UC	Winner GS	USC	Runner-up	(Croatia) Ivica Olić	10	(Russia) Valery Gazzaev
2006	Premier League	1	30	17	7	6	47	28	58	Winner	CL	GS	RSC	Winner	(Brazil) Jô	14	(Russia) Valery Gazzaev
2007	Premier League	3	30	14	11	5	43	24	53	Round of 16	UC; CL	R32; GS	RSC	Winner	(Brazil) Jô (Brazil) Vágner Love	13	(Russia) Valery Gazzaev
2008	Premier League	2	30	16	8	6	53	24	56	Winner	UC	R16	-		(Brazil) Vágner Love	20	(Russia) Valery Gazzaev
2009	Premier League	5	30	16	4	10	48	30	52	Winner	CL	QF	RSC	Winner	(Serbia) Miloš Krasić (Czech Republic) Tomáš Necid	9	(Brazil) Zico (Spain) Juande Ramos (Russia) Leonid Slutsky
2010	Premier League	2	30	18	8	4	51	22	59	Round of 32	EL	R16	RSC	Runner-up	(Brazil) Vágner Love	9	(Russia) Leonid Slutsky
2011–12	Premier League	3	44	19	9	16	72	47	73	2010–11 Winner 2011–12 R32	CL	R16	RSC	Runner-up	(Ivory Coast) Seydou Doumbia	28	(Russia) Leonid Slutsky
2012–13	Premier League	1	30	20	4	6	49	25	64	Winner	EL	PO	-		(Nigeria) Ahmed Musa	11	(Russia) Leonid Slutsky
2013–14	Premier League	1	30	20	4	6	49	26	64	Semi-finals	CL	GS	RSC	Winner	(Ivory Coast) Seydou Doumbia	18	(Russia) Leonid Slutsky
2014–15	Premier League	2	30	19	3	8	67	27	60	Semi-finals	CL	GS	RSC	Winner	(Finland) Roman Eremenko	13	(Russia) Leonid Slutsky
2015–16	Premier League	1	30	20	5	5	51	25	65	Runner-Up	CL	GS	-		(Nigeria) Ahmed Musa	13	(Russia) Leonid Slutsky
2016–17	Premier League	2	30	18	8	4	47	15	62	Round of 32	CL	GS	RSC	Runner-up	(Russia) Fyodor Chalov (Israel) Bibras Natcho (Brazil) Vitinho	6	(Russia) Leonid Slutsky (Belarus) Viktor Goncharenko
2017–18	Premier League	2	30	17	7	6	49	23	58	Round of 32	CL; EL	GS; QF	-		(Brazil) Vitinho	10	(Belarus) Viktor Goncharenko
2018–19	Premier League	4	30	14	9	7	46	23	51	Round of 32	CL	GS	RSC	Winner	(Russia) Fyodor Chalov	15	(Belarus) Viktor Goncharenko
2019–20	Premier League	4	30	14	8	8	43	29	50	Quarter-finals	EL	GS	-		(Croatia) Nikola Vlašić	12	(Belarus) Viktor Goncharenko
2020–21	Premier League	6	30	15	5	10	51	33	50	Semi-finals	EL	GS	-		(Croatia) Nikola Vlašić	11	(Belarus) Viktor Goncharenko (Croatia) Ivica Olić
2021–22	Premier League	5	30	15	5	10	42	29	50	Quarter-finals	-	-	-		(Turkey) Yusuf Yazıcı	8	(Russia) Aleksei Berezutski
2022–23	Premier League	2	30	17	7	6	57	26	58	Winner	Suspended		-		(Russia) Fyodor Chalov	19	(Russia) Vladimir Fedotov
2023–24	Premier League	6	30	12	12	6	56	40	48	Semi-finals	Suspended		RSC	Runner-up	(Russia) Fyodor Chalov	12	(Russia) Vladimir Fedotov
2024–25	Premier League	3	30	17	8	5	49	21	59	Winner	Suspended		-	-	(Russia) Ivan Oblyakov (Russia) Tamerlan Musayev	7	(Serbia) Marko Nikolić
2025–26	Premier League	5	30	15	6	9	44	33	51	Semi-finals	Suspended		RSC	Winner	(Russia) Danil Krugovoy (Russia) Matvey Kislyak (Russia) Ivan Oblyakov	6	(Switzerland) Fabio Celestini (Russia) Dmitry Igdisamov (caretaker)

== CSKA in European football ==
As of match played 10 December 2020

=== By competition ===
Competition	P	W	D	L	GS	GA	%W
European Cup / UEFA Champions League	104	34	24	46	125	155	32.69
UEFA Cup / UEFA Europa League	69	31	18	20	97	67	44.93
Cup Winners' Cup	4	2	0	2	5	5	50.00
UEFA Super Cup	1	0	0	1	1	3	0.00
Total	178	67	42	69	228	230	37.64

=== UEFA club coefficient ranking ===
As of 21 September 2023. Source: UEFA Coefficients

Rank	Team	Points
183	(Denmark) Randers	7.000
184	(Cyprus) Anorthosis	7.000
185	(Russia) CSKA Moscow	7.000
186	(Turkey) Adana Demirspor	2.500
187	(Turkey) Konyaspor	2.000

=== Football Club Elo ranking ===
As of 29 August 2024

Rank	Team	Points
128	(France) Lorient	1574
129	(Ukraine) Shakhtar Donetsk	1573
130	(Russia) CSKA Moscow	1571
131	(Spain) SD Eibar	1571
132	(Germany) Hamburg	1571

== Players ==
=== Current squad ===
As of 16 September 2026

Note: Flags indicate national team as defined under FIFA eligibility rules; some limited exceptions apply. Players may hold more than one non-FIFA nationality.

No.	Pos.	Nation	Player
2	DF	BRA	Matheus Reis
3	DF	RUS	Danil Krugovoy
4	DF	BRA	João Victor
6	MF	RUS	Dmitri Barinov
7	MF	BRA	Matheus Alves
10	MF	RUS	Ivan Oblyakov
11	FW	RUS	Tamerlan Musayev
17	FW	RUS	Kirill Glebov
18	MF	RUS	Danila Kozlov
19	MF	RUS	Ivan Oleynikov
20	MF	SRB	Matija Popović
21	DF	ALG	Mohamed Azzi
22	DF	SRB	Milan Gajić
23	DF	RUS	Dzhamalutdin Abdulkadyrov

No.	Pos.	Nation	Player
27	DF	BRA	Moisés
31	MF	RUS	Matvey Kislyak
32	FW	ARG	Luciano Gondou
35	GK	RUS	Igor Akinfeev (captain)
37	MF	BRA	Henrique Carmo
39	GK	RUS	Maksim Borisko
49	GK	RUS	Vladislav Torop
52	MF	ARM	Artyom Bandikyan
61	DF	RUS	Pavel Filyushin
62	FW	RUS	Imran Firov
67	DF	RUS	Mingiyan Badmayev
79	DF	RUS	Kirill Danilov
90	DF	RUS	Matvey Lukin
97	FW	RUS	Maksim Voronov

=== Out on loan ===
Note: Flags indicate national team as defined under FIFA eligibility rules; some limited exceptions apply. Players may hold more than one non-FIFA nationality.

No.	Pos.	Nation	Player
—	DF	ARG	Ramiro Di Luciano (at Čukarički until 30 June 2027)
—	MF	RUS	Gleb Popolitov (at Pari Nizhny Novgorod until 30 June 2027)
—	MF	ARG	Rodrigo Villagra (at Internacional until 31 December 2026)

No.	Pos.	Nation	Player
—	FW	BRA	Alerrandro (at Internacional until 31 December 2026)
—	FW	BLR	Artyom Shumansky (at Akron until 30 June 2027)

=== Retired numbers ===
- **12** – Club supporters (the 12th man)
- **16** – (Ukraine) Serhiy Perkhun, goalkeeper (2001) – posthumous honor

=== Notable players ===
Had international caps for their respective countries. Players whose name is listed in bold represented their countries while playing for CSKA.

USSR/Russia

- (Soviet Union) **Yuri Adzhem**
- (Soviet Union) **Valentin Afonin**
- (Soviet Union) **German Apukhtin**
- (Soviet Union) **Vladimir Astapovsky**
- (Soviet Union) **Anatoli Bashashkin**
- (Soviet Union) **Yozhef Betsa**
- (Soviet Union) Vsevolod Bobrov
- (Soviet Union) **Valentin Bubukin**
- (Soviet Union) Vyacheslav Chanov
- (Soviet Union) **Yuri Chesnokov**
- (Soviet Union) Sergey Dmitriyev
- (Soviet Union) **Sergei Fokin**
- (Soviet Union) **Yuriy Istomin**
- (Soviet Union) **Vladimir Kaplichny**
- (Soviet Union) Vagiz Khidiyatullin
- (Soviet Union) Anatoly Krutikov
- (Soviet Union) Nikolai Manoshin
- (Soviet Union) **Valentin Nikolayev**
- (Soviet Union) **Valeri Novikov**
- (Soviet Union) **Yuri Nyrkov**
- (Soviet Union) **Mikhail Perevalov**
- (Soviet Union) **Aleksandr Petrov**
- (Soviet Union) **Viktor Ponedelnik**
- (Soviet Union) Igor Ponomaryov
- (Soviet Union) **Anatoli Porkhunov**
- (Soviet Union) **Boris Razinsky**
- (Soviet Union) Viktor Samokhin
- (Soviet Union) **Albert Shesternyov**
- (Soviet Union) Valeri Shmarov
- (Soviet Union) Andriy Sidelnikov
- (Soviet Union) **Aleksandr Tarkhanov**
- (Soviet Union) Viktor Yanushevsky
- (Soviet Union) Georgi Yartsev
- (Soviet Union) **Mikhail Yeryomin**
- (Soviet Union) **Viktor Zvyagintsev**
- (Commonwealth of Independent States) Sergey Shustikov
- (Russia) **Dzhamalutdin Abdulkadyrov**
- (Russia) Andrei Afanasyev
- (Russia) **Ilzat Akhmetov**
- (Russia) **Igor Akinfeev**
- (Russia) **Yevgeni Aldonin**
- (Russia) **Dmitri Barinov**
- (Russia) **Aleksei Berezutski**
- (Russia) **Vasili Berezutski**
- (Russia) **Maksim Bokov**
- (Russia) **Yevgeni Bushmanov**
- (Russia) **Fyodor Chalov**
- (Russia) **Nikita Chernov**
- (Russia) **Kirill Danilov**
- (Russia) **Vyacheslav Dayev**
- (Russia) **Igor Diveyev**
- (Russia) **Alan Dzagoev**
- (Russia) Soslan Dzhanayev
- (Russia) **Ilshat Fayzulin**
- (Russia) (Brazil) **Mário Fernandes**
- (Russia) **Sergei Filippenkov**
- (Russia) Vladimir Gabulov
- (Russia) (Commonwealth of Independent States) (Soviet Union) **Dmitri Galiamin**
- (Russia) **Kirill Glebov**
- (Russia) **Aleksandr Golovin**
- (Russia) **Rolan Gusev**
- (Russia) **Sergei Ignashevich**
- (Russia) Aleksei Ionov
- (Russia) (Commonwealth of Independent States) (Soviet Union) Andrei Ivanov
- (Russia) Vyacheslav Karavayev
- (Russia) (Commonwealth of Independent States) Valeri Karpin
- (Russia) (Commonwealth of Independent States) (Soviet Union) **Dmitri Kharine**
- (Russia) **Dmitri Khokhlov**
- (Russia) **Dmitri Kirichenko**
- (Russia) **Matvey Kislyak**
- (Russia) **Sergei Kolotovkin**
- (Russia) **Oleg Kornaukhov**
- (Russia) (Commonwealth of Independent States) (Soviet Union) **Igor Korneev**
- (Russia) **Danil Krugovoy**
- (Russia) **Konstantin Kuchayev**
- (Russia) **Alan Kusov**
- (Russia) (Commonwealth of Independent States) (Soviet Union) **Dmitri Kuznetsov**
- (Russia) **Matvey Lukin**
- (Russia) **Pavel Mamayev**
- (Russia) **Veniamin Mandrykin**
- (Russia) **Valeri Minko**
- (Russia) (Soviet Union) Andrei Mokh
- (Russia) **Maksim Mukhin**
- (Russia) **Tamerlan Musayev**
- (Russia) **Kirill Nababkin**
- (Russia) **Ruslan Nigmatullin**
- (Russia) **Andrei Novosadov**
- (Russia) **Ivan Oblyakov**
- (Russia) Kirill Panchenko
- (Russia) Ilya Pomazun
- (Russia) **Denis Popov**
- (Russia) (Commonwealth of Independent States) Andrey Pyatnitsky
- (Russia) **Vladislav Radimov**
- (Russia) **Sergei Semak**
- (Russia) Igor Semshov
- (Russia) Dmitri Sennikov
- (Russia) (Commonwealth of Independent States) (Soviet Union) **Oleg Sergeyev**
- (Russia) **Georgi Shchennikov**
- (Russia) **Roman Shirokov**
- (Russia) **Andrei Solomatin**
- (Russia) (Soviet Union) **Vladimir Tatarchuk**
- (Russia) **Yevgeni Varlamov**
- (Russia) **Viktor Vasin**
- (Russia) Oleg Veretennikov
- (Russia) Renat Yanbayev
- (Russia) **Igor Yanovsky**
- (Russia) **Dmitri Yefremov**
- (Russia) **Denis Yevsikov**
- (Russia) **Anton Zabolotny**
- (Russia) Rifat Zhemaletdinov
- (Russia) **Yuri Zhirkov**

Europe

- (Armenia) **Artyom Bandikyan**
- (Armenia) Andrey Movsisyan
- (Armenia) Tigran Petrosyants
- (Armenia) Nair Tiknizyan
- (Azerbaijan) **Deni Gaisumov**
- (Azerbaijan) Vagif Javadov
- (Azerbaijan) **Dmitriy Kramarenko**
- (Belarus) **Yury Antanovich**
- (Belarus) **Vyacheslav Geraschenko**
- (Belarus) **Artyom Shumansky**
- (Belarus) **Vadim Skripchenko**
- (Bosnia and Herzegovina) Miralem Pjanić
- (Bosnia and Herzegovina) **Elvir Rahimić**
- (Bulgaria) **Georgi Milanov**
- (Croatia) **Ivica Olić**
- (Croatia) **Nikola Vlašić**
- (Czech Republic) **Jiří Jarošík**
- (Czech Republic) **Tomáš Necid**
- (Finland) **Roman Eremenko**
- (Iceland) **Hörður Magnússon**
- (Iceland) **Arnór Sigurðsson**
- (Israel) **Bibras Natcho**
- (Kazakhstan) **Baktiyar Zaynutdinov**
- (Latvia) **Aleksandrs Cauņa**
- (Latvia) **Juris Laizāns**
- (Lithuania) Valdas Ivanauskas
- (Lithuania) **Edgaras Jankauskas**
- (Lithuania) **Deividas Šemberas**
- (Moldova) **Oleg Șișchin**
- (Poland) **Dawid Janczyk**
- (Serbia) **Milan Gajić**
- (Serbia) **Miloš Krasić**
- (Serbia) **Zoran Tošić**
- (Serbia) **Saša Zdjelar**
- (Slovakia) **Marek Hollý**
- (Slovenia) **Jaka Bijol**
- (Sweden) **Rasmus Elm**
- (Sweden) **Pontus Wernbloom**
- (Turkey) **Caner Erkin**
- (Turkey) **Yusuf Yazıcı**
- (Ukraine) **Serhiy Perkhun**
- (Ukraine) **Bohdan Shershun**
- (Ukraine) Dmytro Tyapushkin

South America

- (Argentina) Adolfo Gaich
- (Brazil) **Daniel Carvalho**
- (Brazil) **Dudu Cearense**
- (Brazil) **Jô**
- (Brazil) **Vágner Love**
- (Chile) **Víctor Dávila**
- (Chile) **Mark González**
- (Chile) **Víctor Méndez**
- (Colombia) **Jorge Carrascal**
- (Colombia) Daniel Ruiz
- (Paraguay) **Jesús Medina**
- (Uruguay) Abel Hernández
- (Venezuela) **Saúl Guarirapa**
- (Venezuela) Salomón Rondón

Africa

- (Algeria) **Mohamed Azzi**
- (Ivory Coast) **Seydou Doumbia**
- (Ivory Coast) Jean-Philippe Gbamin
- (Ivory Coast) Lacina Traoré
- (Liberia) **Sekou Oliseh**
- (Mali) **Sékou Koïta**
- (Niger) **Ouwo Moussa Maazou**
- (Nigeria) **Chidera Ejuke**
- (Nigeria) **Ahmed Musa**
- (Nigeria) **Chidi Odiah**
- (Nigeria) Aaron Olanare

Asia

- (South Korea) Kim In-Sung
- (Japan) **Keisuke Honda**
- (Tajikistan) Valeri Sarychev
- (Turkmenistan) (Soviet Union) **Valeri Broshin**
- (Turkmenistan) **Dmitri Khomukha**
- (Uzbekistan) Vitaliy Denisov
- (Uzbekistan) **Abbosbek Fayzullaev**
- (Uzbekistan) **Alexander Geynrikh**

== Club officials ==
Administration	Coaching staff (senior team)	Coaching staff (U-21 team)	Medical staff	Administrative staff
President – (Russia) Evgeniy Giner; General director – (Russia) Roman Babaev; Executive director – (Russia) Dmitriy Egorov; Commercial director – (Russia) Andrey Zarubyan	Head coach – (Russia) Dmitriy Igdisamov; Assistant coach – (Russia) Murat Iskakov; Assistant coach – (Turkmenistan) Witaliý Kafanow; First-team coach – (Serbia) Radoje Smiljanić; First-team coach – (Serbia) Aleksandar Rogić; Goalkeeping coach – (Azerbaijan) Dmitriy Kramarenko; Fitness coach – (Russia) Igor Aksenov; Analyst coach – (Russia) Evgeny Shevelev; Analyst coach – (Russia) Vyacheslav Nebratenko; Team manager – (Russia) Aleksandr Stelmakh; Senior international relations manager – (Russia) Maksim Golovlev; Video analyst – (Russia) Igor Pecheritsa; Video analyst – (Russia) Igor Artyushkin	Head coach –; Assistant coach – (Russia) Maksim Bokov; Assistant coach – (Russia) Andrey Gorokhov; Goalkeeping coach – (Russia) Oleg Yurchenko; Fitness coach – (Russia) Aleksandr Driga; Administrator – (Russia) Gevond Hublarov; Doctor – (Russia) David Tskhakaya; Doctor – (Russia) Georgy Ilyich; Masseur – (Russia) Evgeny Trofimov; Masseur – (Russia) Sergey Solomentsev; Video operator – (Russia) Aleksandr Pelevin	Head of the medical stuff – (Russia) Eduard Bezuglov; Deputy head of the medical department – (Russia) Maksim Golovlev; Main team doctor – (Russia) Sergey Izmaylov; Main team doctor – (Russia) Philipp Chubarovskiy; Core team physical rehabilitation specialist – (Russia) Igor Stepanov; Physiotherapist-Rehabilitation specialist of the core team – (Russia) Pavel Grevtsov; Physiotherapist-Rehabilitation specialist of the core team – (Spain) Omid Etemad; Core team rehabilitation physician – (Russia) Vasily Demchenko; Massage therapist of the core team – (Russia) Aleksandr Chistyakov; Massage therapist of the core team – (Georgia (country)) Zauri Bolkvadze; Core team rehabilitation physician – (Russia) Yevgeniy Lebedenko; Medical department administrator – (Russia) Andrey Bibitchev; Chief doctor of the academy – (Russia) Elvira Usmanova; Youth team doctor – (Russia) David Tskhakaya; Youth team doctor – (Russia); Evgeny Trofimov: Youth team doctor – (Russia) Georgy Ilyich; Youth team massage therapist – (Russia) Sergey Solomentsev	Chief physician – (Russia) Eduard Bezuglov; Doctor – (Russia) Sergey Izmaylov; Doctor – (Russia) Philipp Chubarovskiy; Physical rehabilitation specialist – (Russia) Igor Stepanov; Physiotherapist-Rehabilitologist – (Spain) Omid Etemad; Physiotherapist-Rehabilitologist – (Russia) Pavel Grevtsov; Rehabilitation specialist – (Russia) Vasily Demchenko; Masseur – (Russia) Yevgeniy Lebedenko; Masseur – (Russia) Aleksandr Chistyakov; Masseur – (Georgia (country)) Zauri Bolkvadze; Administrator – (Russia) Yuri Gusakov; Administrator – (Russia) Vladislav Stelmakh; Administrator of the medical department – (Russia) Andrey Bibitchev; Translator – (Russia) Vladislav Kulakov

=== Coaching history ===
As of match played 24 July 2022

Nationality	Name	From	To	Duration	P	W	D	L	Win %
USSR	Pavel Khalkiopov	1936	1936						
USSR	Mikhail Rushchinsky	1937	1939						
USSR	Sergey Bukhteyev	1940	1941						
USSR	Pyotr Yezhov	1941							
USSR	Yevgeni Nikishin	1942	1944						
USSR	Boris Arkadyev	1944	1952						
USSR	Konstantin Lyaskovskiy	1954	1954						
USSR	Grigori Pinaichev	1954	1957						
USSR	Boris Arkadyev	1958	1959						
USSR	Grigori Pinaichev	1959	1960						
USSR	Konstantin Beskov	1961	1962						
USSR	Vyacheslav Solovyov	1963	1964						
USSR	Valentin Nikolayev	1964	1965						
USSR	Sergei Shaposhnikov	1966	1967						
USSR	Vsevolod Bobrov	1967	1969						
USSR	Valentin Nikolayev	1970	1973						
USSR	Vladimir Agapov	1973	1974						
USSR	Anatoly Tarasov	1975	1975						
USSR	Aleksei Mamykin	1976	1977						
USSR	Vsevolod Bobrov	1977	1978						
USSR	Sergei Shaposhnikov	1979	1979						
USSR	Oleh Bazylevych	1980	1982						
USSR	Albert Shesternyov	1982	1983						
USSR	Sergei Shaposhnikov	1983	1983						
USSR	Yury Morozov	1984	1987						
USSR	Sergei Shaposhnikov	1987	1988						
USSR; Russia	Pavel Sadyrin	1989	1992						
Russia	Gennadi Kostylev	1992	1993						
Russia	Boris Kopeykin	1993	1994						
Russia	Aleksandr Tarkhanov	5 July 1994	23 January 1997	2 years, 202 days	91	47	18	26	51.65
Russia	Pavel Sadyrin	23 January 1997	2 July 1998	1 year, 160 days	54	16	16	22	29.63
Russia	Oleg Dolmatov	2 July 1998	29 May 2000	1 year, 332 days	65	39	12	15	60
Russia	Pavel Sadyrin	1 July 2000	2 October 2001	1 year, 93 days	24	12	3	9	50
Russia	Valery Gazzaev	2 October 2001	24 November 2003	2 years, 53 days	80	48	14	18	60
Portugal	Artur Jorge	24 November 2003	12 July 2004	231 days	20	9	7	4	45
Russia	Valery Gazzaev	12 July 2004	22 November 2008	4 years, 133 days	213	119	52	42	55.87
Brazil	Zico	9 January 2009	10 September 2009	244 days	28	14	5	9	50
Spain	Juande Ramos	10 September 2009	26 October 2009	46 days	9	4	1	4	44.44
Russia	Leonid Slutsky	26 October 2009	7 December 2016	7 years, 42 days	287	160	57	70	55.75
Belarus	Viktor Goncharenko	12 December 2016	22 March 2021	4 years, 100 days	183	92	40	51	50.27
Croatia	Ivica Olić	23 March 2021	15 June 2021	84 days	9	4	1	4	44.44
Russia	Aleksei Berezutski	15 June 2021	15 June 2022	1 year, 0 days	34	18	5	11	52.94
Russia	Vladimir Fedotov	15 June 2022	Present	4 years, 158 days	2	2	0	0	100

== Ownerships, kit suppliers and shirt sponsors ==
Period	Kit manufacturers	Shirt sponsor	Owners
1980–1990	Adidas	None	Soviet MOD and then Russian MOD through CSKA Moscow society
1991–1994	Umbro	None	Soviet MOD and then Russian MOD through CSKA Moscow society
1995–1996	Nike	None	Soviet MOD and then Russian MOD through CSKA Moscow society
1997–1999	Adidas	None	Soviet MOD and then Russian MOD through CSKA Moscow society
2000–2003	Umbro	None	Bluecastle Enterprises Ltd. (Yevgeni Giner)
2004	Umbro	Konti	Bluecastle Enterprises Ltd. (Yevgeni Giner)
2004–2005	Umbro	Sibneft	Bluecastle Enterprises Ltd. (Yevgeni Giner)
2006–2008	Umbro	VTB Bank	Bluecastle Enterprises Ltd. (Yevgeni Giner)
2009	Reebok	Aeroflot	Bluecastle Enterprises Ltd. (Yevgeni Giner)
2010–2012	Reebok	Bashneft	Bluecastle Enterprises Ltd. (Yevgeni Giner)
2012–2013	Adidas	Aeroflot	Bluecastle Enterprises Ltd. (Yevgeni Giner)
2013–2018	Adidas	Rosseti	Bluecastle Enterprises Ltd. (Yevgeni Giner)
2018–2020	Umbro	Rosseti	Bluecastle Enterprises Ltd. (Yevgeni Giner)
2020–2023	Joma	ICS Holding	VEB.RF
2023–2025	Joma	Gold'n Apotheka	VEB.RF
2025–present	Primera	Gold'n Apotheka	VEB.RF

== Supporters and rivalries ==
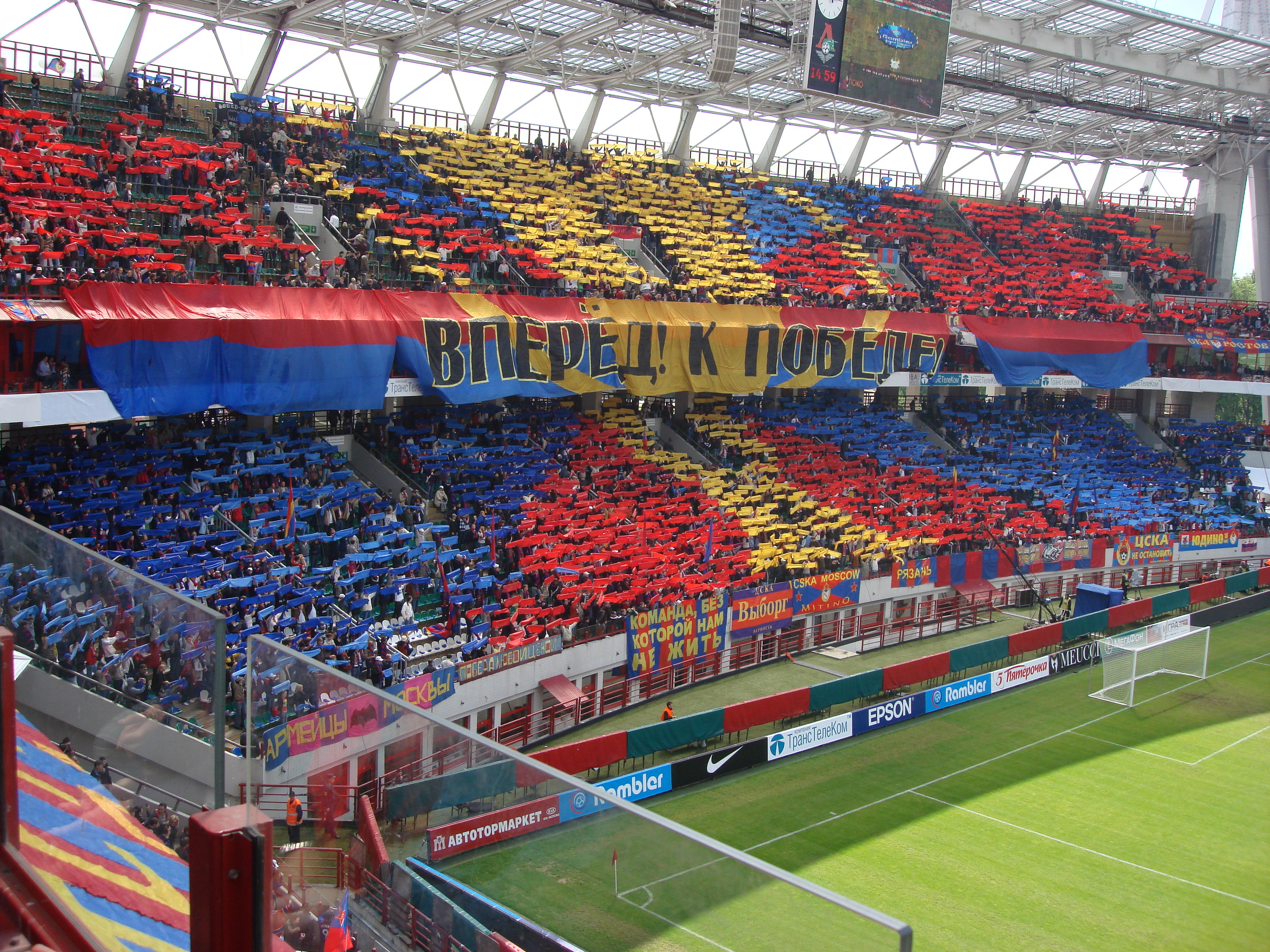
CSKA Moscow fans

CSKA Moscow fans maintain good relations with the fans of Serbian Partizan, Greek PAOK FC, Bulgarian CSKA Sofia, Polish Widzew Łódź and Ruch Chorzów, Romanian CSA Steaua București, and fellow Russian fans of Dynamo Moscow. The Club's main rival is Spartak Moscow.

=== Nickname ===
CSKA was nicknamed Horses because the first stadium was built on the old racecourse/hippodromo in Moscow. It was considered offensive, but later it was transformed into The Horses, and currently this nickname is used by players and fans as the name, along with other variants such as Army Men (Russian: армейцы) and Red-Blues (Russian: красно-синие).

=== Famous fans ===
- Alexander Babakov
- Matvey Blanter
- Aleksey Buldakov
- Igor Butman
- Semyon Farada
- Oleg Gazmanov
- Andrei Grechko
- Sergei Ivanov
- Konstantin Kinchev
- Leonid Kuravlyov
- Otar Kushanashvili
- Denis Lebedev
- Yegor Letov
- Oleg Menshikov
- Aleksey Merinov
- Maya Plisetskaya
- Aleksandr Porokhovshchikov
- Natalya Seleznyova
- Maksim Shevchenko
- Mikhail Tanich
- Natalya Varley
- Vladimir Vysotsky
- Sergei Yastrzhembsky
- Mikhail Youzhny
- Vladimir Zeldin

== Club records ==
=== Appearances ===
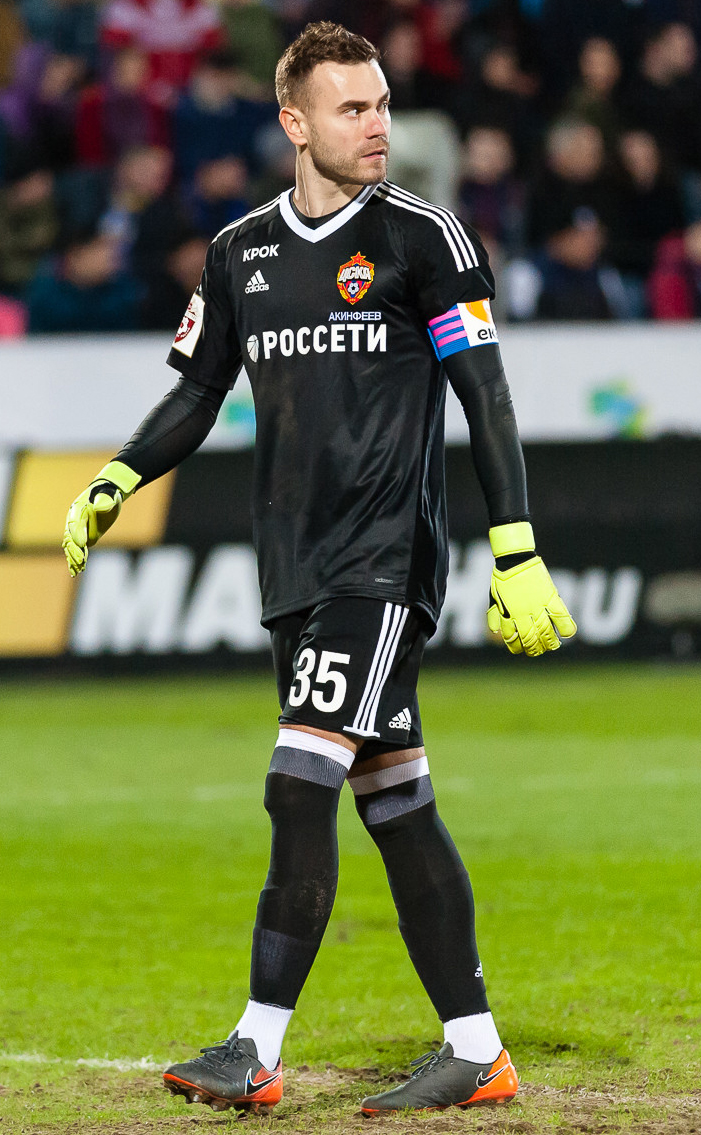
Igor Akinfeev with the most appearances for CSKA at 797

As of 1st June 2025

	Name	Years	League	Cup	Europe	Other^{1}	Total
1	(Russia) Igor Akinfeev	2003–present	596 (0)	55 (0)	132 (0)	14 (0)	797 (0)
2	(Russia) Sergei Ignashevich	2004–2018	381 (35)	39 (6)	111 (5)	9 (0)	540 (46)
3	(Russia) Vasili Berezutski	2002–2018	376 (9)	40 (0)	105 (4)	10 (0)	531 (13)
4	(Russia) Aleksei Berezutski	2001–2018	341 (8)	46 (0)	106 (3)	9 (0)	502 (11)
5	(Soviet Union) Vladimir Fedotov	1960–1975	382 (92)	42 (8)	3 (0)	0 (0)	427 (100)
6	(Russia) Alan Dzagoev	2008–2022	282 (55)	32 (5)	78 (17)	5 (0)	397 (77)
7	(Soviet Union) Vladimir Polikarpov	1962–1974	341 (75)	38 (8)	4 (0)	0 (0)	383 (83)
9	(Russia) Georgi Shchennikov	2008–2023	257 (6)	23 (1)	74 (3)	7 (0)	367 (10)
8	(Lithuania) Deividas Šemberas	2002–2012	254 (1)	37 (0)	70 (0)	6 (1)	367 (2)
10	(Bosnia and Herzegovina) Elvir Rahimić	2001–2014	240 (6)	36 (0)	64 (0)	7 (0)	347 (6)
11	(Soviet Union) Dmitri Bagrich	1958–1970	313 (1)	18 (0)	0 (0)	0 (0)	331 (1)
12	(Soviet Union) (Commonwealth of Independent States) (Russia) Dmitri Galiamin	1981–1991	299 (3)	29 (3)	2 (0)	0 (0)	330 (6)
13	(Russia) Sergei Semak	1994–2004	282 (68)	25 (9)	21 (6)	1 (0)	329 (84)
14	(Russia) Mario Fernandes	2012–2022	259 (9)	19 (2)	48 (0)	3 (0)	329 (11)
15	(Soviet Union) Volodymyr Kaplychnyi	1966–1975	288 (5)	35 (1)	4 (0)	0 (0)	327 (6)
16	(Russia) Kirill Nababkin	2009–2024	237 (4)	39 (0)	43 (1)	5 (0)	324 (5)
17	(Soviet Union) (Commonwealth of Independent States) (Russia) Dmitri Kuznetsov	1984–1991, 1992, 1997–1998	292 (49)	29 (5)	2 (0)	0 (0)	323 (54)
18	(Russia) Evgeni Aldonin	2004–2013	213 (6)	31 (5)	66 (2)	5 (0)	315 (13)
19	(Soviet Union) Albert Shesternyov	1959–1972	278 (1)	23 (0)	4 (0)	0 (0)	305 (1)
20	(Soviet Union) Aleksey Grinin	1939–1952	246 (82)	34 (18)	0 (0)	13 (4)	293 (104)

^{1}Includes Russian Super Cup, Russian Premier League Cup and UEFA Super Cup.

=== Top goalscorers ===
As of 8 December 2024

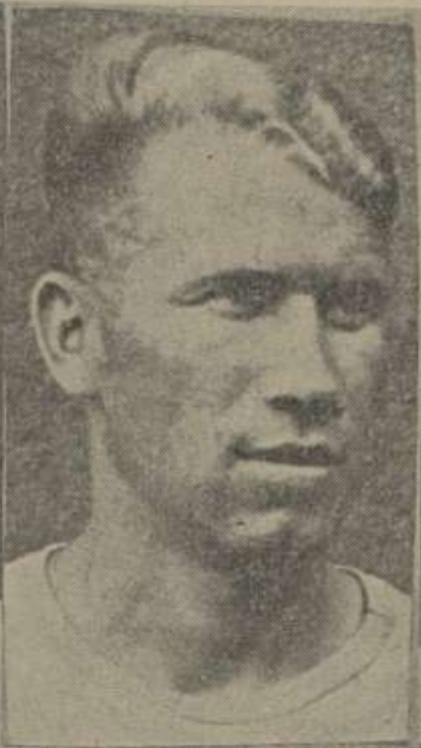
Grigory Fedotov scored 161 goals in 169 games during his CSKA career

	Name	Years	League	Cup	Europe	Other^{1}	Total
1	(Soviet Union) Grigory Fedotov	1938–1949	128 (160)	10 (18)	0 (0)	18 (23)	161 (196)
2	(Brazil) Vágner Love	2004–2011, 2013	85 (169)	8 (27)	30 (57)	1 (6)	124 (259)
3	(Soviet Union) Valentin Nikolayev	1940–1952	81 (201)	23 (36)	0 (0)	14 (16)	118 (253)
4	(Soviet Union) Aleksey Grinin	1939-1952	82 (246)	18 (34)	0 (0)	4 (13)	104 (293)
5	(Soviet Union) Vsevolod Bobrov	1945–1949	84 (79)	18 (20)	0 (0)	0 (0)	102 (99)
6	(Soviet Union) Vladimir Fedotov	1960–1975	92 (382)	8 (42)	0 (0)	0 (0)	100 (427)
7	(Soviet Union) Vladimir Dyomin	1941-1952, 1954	80 (195)	15 (35)	0 (0)	3 (8)	98 (238)
8	(Ivory Coast) Seydou Doumbia	2010–2014, 2015	66 (108)	5 (11)	23 (30)	1 (1)	95 (150)
9	(Soviet Union) Boris Kopeikin	1969-1977	71 (223)	21 (37)	2 (4)	0 (0)	94 (264)
10	(Russia) Fyodor Chalov	2016–2024	76 (197)	9 (32)	4 (30)	0 (2)	89 (261)
11	(Soviet Union) Yuri Chesnokov	1975–1983	72 (252)	14 (35)	1 (2)	0 (0)	87 (289)
12	(Russia) Sergei Semak	1994–2004	68 (282)	9 (25)	6 (21)	0 (1)	84 (329)
13	(Soviet Union) Vladimir Polikarpov	1962-1974	75 (341)	8 (38)	0 (4)	0 (0)	83 (383)
14	(Russia) Valeri Masalitin	1987–1989, 1990–1992, 1993	73 (134)	5 (20)	0 (2)	0 (0)	78 (156)
15	(Russia) Alan Dzagoev	2008–2022	55 (282)	5 (32)	17 (78)	0 (5)	77 (397)
16	(Soviet Union) Aleksandr Tarkhanov	1976–1984	61 (249)	10 (33)	1 (2)	0 (0)	72 (284)
17	(Russia) Vladimir Kulik	1997–2001	49 (140)	14 (18)	0 (4)	(-)	63 (162)
18	(Nigeria) Ahmed Musa	2012–2016, 2018	48 (135)	6 (15)	7 (32)	0 (2)	61 (184)
19	(Soviet Union) (Commonwealth of Independent States) (Russia) Igor Korneev	1985–1991	48 (144)	9 (20)	0 (2)		57 (166)
20	(Soviet Union) (Commonwealth of Independent States) (Russia) Dmitri Kuznetsov	1984–1991, 1992, 1997–1998	49 (292)	5 (29)	0 (2)		54 (323)

^{1}Includes Russian Super Cup, Russian Premier League Cup and UEFA Super Cup.

== CSKA Women ==
CSKA's women's football team was founded in 1990 and competed in Soviet Championship's second level. Following the dissolution of the Soviet Union that same year, it registered in the Russian Supreme Division, where it competed for two seasons before it folded.

Following the disbanding of Zorky Krasnogorsk near the end of the 2015 Top Division, FK Rossiyanka filled its vacancy for the next season and the new team was registered as CSKA in the 2016 championship. Its first game, a 1–1 draw against Chertanovo, coincided with the 93rd anniversary of the CSKA's first football match. CSKA ended the championship second-to-last, while Rossiyanka won its fifth title.

In July 2017, during the inter-season summer pause, it became a CSKA official section. Two months later the team won its first title after defeating Chertanovo 1–0 in the Russian Cup final.

In recent years CSKA Women won two Russian championships in a row, in 2019 and 2020 and made their debut in UEFA Women's Champions League.

== FC CSKA-d Moscow and FC CSKA-2 Moscow ==
The reserves team played on the professional level as FC CSKA-d Moscow (Russian Second League in 1992–93, Russian Third League in 1994–97, Russian Second Division in 1998–00, in 1998–00 team was called FC CSKA-2 Moscow). A separate farm club called FC CSKA-2 Moscow played in the Soviet Second League in 1986–89, Soviet Second League B in 1990–91, Russian Second League in 1992–93 and Russian Third League in 1994. That latter team was called FC Chaika-CSKA-2 Moscow for one season in 1989.

=== Youth team ===
In the Russian period, the CSKA youth team competed in the RPL Reserves Championship (from 2001 to 2007) and the Youth Football League (from 2008 to the present day). During this time, the team achieved the following results:

- Russian Premier League Reserves Championship
  - Winners: 2005
  - Runners-up: 2004, 2006, 2007
  - Third place: 2003
- Youth Football League
  - Winners: 2018–19, 2020–21, 2021–22, 2024, 2026
  - Runners-up: 2013–14, 2016–17, 2017–18, 2019–20, 2025
  - Third place: 2008, 2011, 2011–12, 2012–13, 2015–16, 2022–23

CSKA players have finished as top scorers in the Youth Football League:

- Sergei Samodin — 13 goals in the 2004 season
- Sergei Pravosud — 19 goals in the 2005 season
- Ilya Vostrikov — 17 goals in the 2020–21 season
- Dmitry Koverov — 13 goals in the 2024 season
- Ivan Tarasenko — 24 goals in the 2026 season

The team has also participated in the UEFA Youth League several times. Its highest achievements include:

- Round of 16 against Paris Saint-Germain in the 2013–14 season;
- Quarter-finals against Benfica in the 2016–17 season.

Timur Zhamaletdinov is the team's top scorer in this tournament, with 13 goals in 21 matches.
