= 1944 Soviet Cup =

1944 Cup of USSR in Football
Кубок СССР

Tournament details
- Country: Soviet Union
- Dates: July 30 – August 27
- Teams: 24

Final positions
- Champions: Zenit Leningrad (1st title)
- Runners-up: CDKA Moscow
- Semifinalists: Spartak Moscow; Torpedo Moscow

The 1944 Soviet Cup was an association football cup competition of the Soviet Union.

On June 19, 1944, the chairman of the All-Union Committee on Physical Culture and Sports Vasiliy Snegov appealed to Kliment Voroshilov to conduct a cup competition.

The competition consisted of 24 teams, 13 of which were Class A teams, and 11 others were picked randomly.

== Participating teams ==
Enter in Second Round		Enter in First Round	
8 teams		16 teams	
✓ Spartak Moscow; ✓ Dinamo Kiev; ✓ Krylya Sovetov Moscow; ✓ Torpedo Moscow	✓ Lokomotiv Kharkov; ✓ Aviauchilische Moscow; ✓ Dinamo Ivanovo; ✓ Torpedo Gorkiy	✓ CDKA Moscow; ✓ Traktor Stalingrad; ✓ Dinamo Tbilisi; ✓ Stakhanovets Stalino; ✓ Lokomotiv Moscow; ✓ Zenit Leningrad; ✓ Dinamo Moscow; ✓ Dinamo Leningrad	✓ Dinamo Baku; ✓ Zenit Taganrog; ✓ Dinamo Yerevan; ✓ Krylya Sovetov Kuibyshev; ✓ Dinamo-2 Moscow; ✓ Traktor Chelyabinsk; ✓ DKA Novosibirsk; ✓ Zenit Sverdlovsk

Source: []

== Competition schedule ==
=== First round ===
[Jul 30] 
CDKA Moskva                  5-0  Traktor Stalingrad 
  [Pyotr Shcherbatenko-2, Vladimir Dyomin, Dyachenko, ?] 
DINAMO Baku                  5-1  Zenit Taganrog           [in Rostov-na-Donu] 
DINAMO Tbilisi               w/o  Dinamo Yerevan 
Krylya Sovetov Kuibyshev     1-5  LOKOMOTIV Moskva 
Stakhanovets Stalino         1-5  DINAMO-2 Moskva 
  [Vasiliy Bryushin 33- Konstantin Balyasov 18, ??...] 
ZENIT Leningrad              3-1  Dinamo Moskva 
  [Viktor Bodrov 20 pen, Alexei Yablochkin 63, Boris Levin-Kogan 75 – Konstantin Beskov 86] 
[Aug 2] 
Traktor Chelyabinsk          4-6  DKA Novosibirsk 
Zenit Sverdlovsk             2-11 DINAMO Leningrad

=== Second round ===
[Aug 6] 
CDKA Moskva                  5-0  Lokomotiv Moskva 
  [Vladimir Dyomin, Valentin Nikolayev, Dyachenko, Pyotr Shcherbatenko, Alexei Grinin] 
DINAMO Baku                  2-1  Dinamo Tbilisi 
  [Artash Amirjanov 34, Korolyov 50 – Gayoz jejelava 75] 
Dinamo Ivanovo               0-6  KRYLYA SOVETOV Moskva 
Dinamo Kiev                  1-2  SPARTAK Moskva           [aet] 
  [Konstantin Kalach 61 – Nikolai Klimov 18, 117] 
DINAMO Leningrad             5-1  DKA Novosibirsk          [in Chelyabinsk]  
Dinamo-2 Moskva              0-0  Zenit Leningrad 
Lokomotiv Kharkov            2-3  AVIAUCHILISHCHE Moskva 
  [Valentin Putsenko, Boris Gurkin – Nikolai Tsutskov-2, Alexandr Striganov pen] 
Torpedo Gorkiy               2-3  TORPEDO Moskva 
  [Vasiliy Panfilov, Alexei Salakov – A.Ryomin, Anton Yakovlev, Georgiy Zharkov]

==== Second round replays ====
[Aug 7] 
Dinamo-2 Moskva              0-1  ZENIT Leningrad 
  [Alexei Larionov 39]

=== Quarterfinals ===
[Aug 13] 
Dinamo Leningrad             1-4  CDKA Moskva 
  [Oleg Oshenkov – Valentin Nikolayev-3, Grigoriy Fedotov] 
SPARTAK Moskva               1-0  AviaUchilishche Moskva 
  [Alexei Sokolov 49] 
TORPEDO Moskva               2-1  Krylya Sovetov Moskva 
  [Vasiliy Zharkov 15, Anton Yakovlev 27 – Alexandr Sevidov 82] 
ZENIT Leningrad              1-0  Dinamo Baku 
  [Sergei Salnikov 55]

=== Semifinals ===
[Aug 20] 
CDKA Moskva                  3-2  Torpedo Moskva 
  [Grigoriy Fedotov 12, Pyotr Shcherbatenko 22, Alexei Grinin 55 – Alexandr Ponomaryov 4, 75] 
[Aug 22] 
Spartak Moskva               2-2  Zenit Leningrad 
  [Nikolai Klimov 68, Georgiy Glazkov 72 – Sergei Salnikov 65, Nikolai Smirnov 78]

==== Semifinals replays ====
[Aug 23] 
Spartak Moskva               0-1  ZENIT Leningrad          [aet]
  [Boris Chuchelov 97]

=== Final ===
27 August 1944

CDKA Moscow	1 – 2	Zenit Leningrad
Grinin 35'	[ Report]	Chuchelov 58'; Salnikov 68'

Moscow
