= Yevgeni Nikishin =

Soviet Russian footballer and coach

Personal information
- Full name: Yevgeni Prokofyevich Nikishin
- Date of birth: 21 May 1904
- Place of birth: Moscow, Russian Empire
- Date of death: 25 March 1965 (aged 60)
- Place of death: Moscow, Soviet Union
- Height: 1.79 m (5 ft 10 1/2 in)
- Position: Midfielder

Youth career
- OLLS Moscow

Senior career*
Years	Team	Apps	(Gls)
1921–1938	FC CSKA Moscow		

Managerial career
- 1943–1944: FC CSKA Moscow
- 1944–1947: FC CSKA Moscow (assistant)
- * Club domestic league appearances and goals

Yevgeni Prokofyevich Nikishin (Russian: Евгений Прокофьевич Никишин; 21 May 1904 in Moscow – 25 March 1965 in Moscow) was a Soviet Russian football player and coach.
