= 1955 Soviet Cup =

1955 Cup of USSR in Football
Кубок СССР

Tournament details
- Country: Soviet Union
- Dates: May 25 – October 16
- Teams: 67

Final positions
- Champions: CDSA Moscow
- Runners-up: Dinamo Moscow

The 1955 Soviet Cup was an association football cup competition of the Soviet Union.

== Participating teams ==
Enter in First round
Class A 12/12 teams	Class B 32/32 teams		Republican 18 teams and FShM 5
✓ Dinamo Moscow; ✓ Spartak Moscow; ✓ CDSA Moscow; ✓ Torpedo Moscow; ✓ Lokomotiv Moscow; ✓ Dinamo Kiev; ✓ Shakhter Stalino; ✓ Zenit Leningrad; ✓ Dinamo Tbilisi; ✓ Trudovye Rezervy Leningrad; ✓ Krylia Sovetov Kuibyshev; ✓ Spartak Minsk	✓ Burevestnik Kishenev; ✓ Spartak Kalinin; ✓ ODO Kiev; ✓ Spartak Vilnius; ✓ Krasnoye Znamia Ivanovo; ✓ Trud Stupino; ✓ ODO Lvov; ✓ Metallurg Zaporozhye; ✓ Lokomotiv Kharkov; ✓ Metallurg Dnepropetrovsk; ✓ Shakhter Stalinogorsk; ✓ Pischevik Odessa; ✓ Spartak Uzhgorod; ✓ Daugava Riga; ✓ DOF Sevastopol; ✓ Dinamo Tallinn	✓ ODO Sverdlovsk; ✓ Spartak Yerevan; ✓ ODO Tbilisi; ✓ Torpedo Gorkiy; ✓ Neftianik Krasnodar; ✓ Neftianik Baku; ✓ Voronezh; ✓ Kaliningrad; ✓ Torpedo Rostov-na-Donu; ✓ Urozhai Alma-Ata; ✓ Molotov; ✓ Avangard Sverdlovsk; ✓ Avangard (Dzerzhinets) Chelyabinsk; ✓ Spartak Tashkent; ✓ Torpedo Stalingrad; ✓ Energiya Saratov	✓ ODO Petrozavodsk (Karelia); ✓ ODO Tallinn (Estonia); ✓ Krasny Metallurg Liyepaya (Latvia); ✓ Politekh Institute Kaunas (Lithuania); ✓ Burevestnik Minsk (Belarus); ✓ Mashinostroitel Kiev (Ukraine); ✓ Agricultural Institute Kishinev (Moldova); ✓ Dinamo Kutaisi (Georgia); ✓ Krasnoye Znamia Leninakan (Armenia); ✓ DO Baku (Azerbaijan); ✓ Dinamo Chimkent (Kazakhstan); ✓ Spartak Samarkand (Uzbekistan); ✓ Spartak Frunze (Kirgizia); ✓ Metallurg Leninabad (Tajikistan); ✓ Krasnovodsk (Turkmenia); ✓ DO Khabarovsk (RSFSR); ✓ Krylya Sovetov-3 Moscow; ✓ Kirovskiy Zavod Leningrad; ✓ FShM Moscow; ✓ FShM Leningrad; ✓ FShM Minsk; ✓ FShM Kiev; ✓ FShM Tbilisi

Source: []

== Competition schedule ==
=== Preliminary stage ===
==== Group 1 ====
===== First round =====
[Jun 14] 
Avangard Leningrad            1-2  SPARTAK Uzhgorod 
BUREVESTNIK Kishinev          8-0  SelKhozInstitute Kishinev 
Burevestnik Minsk             0-2  METALLURG Zaporozhye 
KRYLYA SOVETOV Voronezh       2-1  FShM Moskva 
[Jun 22] 
KRASNOVODSK                   w/o  Avangard Sverdlovsk 
Krasny Metallurg Liepaja      2-2  Daugava Riga 
PISHCHEVIK Odessa             5-1  FShM Kiev

====== First round replays ======
[JuN 23] 
KRASNY METALLURG Liepaja      w/o  Daugava Riga

===== Quarterfinals =====
[Jul 14] 
METALLURG Zaporozhye          2-1  Krasny Metallurg Liepaja  [aet] 
NEFTYANIK Baku               12-1  Krasnovodsk 
[Jul 19] 
KRYLYA SOVETOV Voronezh       4-2  Burevestnik Kishinev 
Spartak Uzhgorod              0-2  PISHCHEVIK Odessa         [aet]

===== Semifinals =====
[Jul 24] 
KRYLYA SOVETOV Voronezh       1-0  Metallurg Zaporozhye 
NEFTYANIK Baku                w/o  Pishchevik Odessa

===== Final =====
[Aug 3] 
Krylya Sovetov Voronezh       0-1  NEFTYANIK Baku

==== Group 2 ====
===== Preliminary round =====
Krylya Sovetov-3 Moskva       1-2  ZENIT Kaliningrad (Moscow Region)

===== First round =====
Mashinostroitel Kiev          1-2  METALLURG Dnepropetrovsk 
Metallurg Leninabad           1-7  ODO Sverdlovsk 
ODO Khabarovsk                3-4  KRASNOYE ZNAMYA Ivanovo   [aet] 
ODO Tallinn                   1-0  Dinamo Tallinn 
Spartak Frunze                0-3  KRYLYA SOVETOV Molotov 
SPARTAK Kalinin               6-1  FShM Minsk 
Spartak Samarkand             1-10 SPARTAK Tashkent 
ZENIT Kaliningrad (M.R.)      2-0  Avangard Chelyabinsk

===== Quarterfinals =====
KRASNOYE ZNAMYA Ivanovo       1-0  Zenit Kaliningrad (M.R.) 
KRYLYA SOVETOV Molotov        1-0  ODO Sverdlovsk 
ODO Tallinn                   0-3  METALLURG Dnepropetrovsk 
SPARTAK Kalinin               2-0  Spartak Tashkent

===== Semifinals =====
Krylya Sovetov Molotov        1-2  SPARTAK Kalinin 
METALLURG Dnepropetrovsk      2-0  Krasnoye Znamya Ivanovo

===== Final =====
Metallurg Dnepropetrovsk      0-1  SPARTAK Kalinin

==== Group 3 ====
===== First round =====
Polytech. Institute Kaunas    0-3  SPARTAK Vilnius 
SHAKHTYOR Stalinogorsk        3-1  Krylya Sovetov Stupino 
UROZHAI Alma-Ata              3-1  Metallurg Chimkent

===== Quarterfinals =====
ENERGIYA Saratov              5-0  FShM Leningrad 
Lokomotiv Kharkov             1-3  TORPEDO Gorkiy 
SHAKHTYOR Stalinogorsk        2-0  DOF Sevastopol   
Urozhai Alma-Ata              0-2  SPARTAK Vilnius

===== Semifinals =====
[Jul 21] 
SPARTAK Vilnius               2-1  Shakhtyor Stalinogorsk 
TORPEDO Gorkiy                3-2  Energiya Saratov

===== Final =====
[Aug 2] 
SPARTAK Vilnius               1-0  Torpedo Gorkiy

==== Group 4 ====
===== First round =====
Dinamo Kutaisi                1-2  ODO Tbilisi 
KRASNOYE ZNAMYA Leninakan     w/o  Spartak Yerevan 
ODO Petrozavodsk              1-0  Neftyanik Krasnodar

===== Quarterfinals =====
Krasnoye Znamya Leninakan     0-1  TORPEDO Stalingrad 
ODO Kiev                      2-0  ODO Lvov 
ODO Petrozavodsk              0-5  ODO Tbilisi 
Torpedo Rostov-na-Donu        1-3  FShM Tbilisi

===== Semifinals =====
FShM Tbilisi                  2-4  ODO Kiev 
TORPEDO Stalingrad            1-0  ODO Tbilisi

===== Final =====
ODO Kiev                      w/o  Torpedo Stalingrad

=== Final stage ===
==== First round ====
[May 25] 
DINAMO Moskva                 2-0  Trudoviye Rezervy Leningrad 
  [Yuriy Volodin 27, 62] 
[Jun 30] 
Torpedo Moskva                1-2  SPARTAK Minsk 
  [Valentin Ivanov 46 pen – Nikolai Makarov 7, Igor Bachurin 47] 
[Jul 19] 
DINAMO Tbilisi                3-2  Dinamo Kiev               [aet] 
  [Yuriy Kurtanidze 77, Boris Khasaia 78, Avtandil Gogoberidze 115 – Georgiy Grammatikopulo 14, Viktor Terentyev 69] 
[Jul 28] 
Zenit Leningrad               2-3  LOKOMOTIV Moskva  
  [Valeriy Tsaritsyn 11, Pyotr Katrovskiy 85 – Viktor Sokolov 61, Valentin Bubukin ?, Viktor Razumovskiy ?] 
[Aug 2] 
CDSA Moskva                   3-2  Krylya Sovetov Kuibyshev 
  [Vladimir Agapov-3 (1 pen) – Yozhef Betsa (C) og, Viktor Karpov] 
[Aug 11] 
Spartak Kalinin               1-3  SPARTAK Moskva 
  [V.Frolovskiy 27 – Anatoliy Isayev 6, Sergei Korshunov ?, Anatoliy M.Ilyin ?] 
[Aug 19] 
ODO Kiev                      3-2  Shakhtyor Stalino 
  [Voronin-2, Ivanov – Ivan Fedosov, Sobolev (O) og] 
SPARTAK Vilnius               3-0  Neftyanik Baku 
  [S.Krocas, R.Kazlauskas, ? (N) og]

==== Quarterfinals ====
[Sep 16] 
Spartak Minsk                 0-1  LOKOMOTIV Moskva          [aet] 
  [Alexandr Filyayev 92] 
[Oct 6] 
Dinamo Tbilisi                0-1  CDSA Moskva 
  [Yuriy Belyayev 10] 
[Oct 7] 
SPARTAK Moskva                3-1  ODO Kiev 
  [Nikolai Parshin 14, ?, Sobolev (O) ? og – A.Ryzhikov 88] 
[Oct 8] 
DINAMO Moskva                 2-0  Spartak Vilnius 
  [Yuriy Kuznetsov 29, Vladimir Ilyin 40]

==== Semifinals ====
[Oct 11] 
CDSA Moskva                   1-0  Lokomotiv Moskva 
  [Yuriy Belyayev 75] 
[Oct 12] 
DINAMO Moskva                 4-1  Spartak Moskva 
  [Vladimir Shabrov 7, 34, Genrikh Fedosov 11, 40 – Anatoliy Isayev 46]

==== Final ====
16 October 1955

CDSA Moscow	2 – 1	Dinamo Moscow
Agapov 10', 31' (pen.)	[ Report]	Ryzhkin 13'

Moscow
