= Konstantin Lyaskovskiy =

Soviet Russian footballer (1908–1986)

Personal information
- Full name: Konstantin Pavlovich Lyaskovskiy
- Date of birth: 14 August 1908
- Place of birth: Moscow, Russian Empire
- Date of death: 20 January 1986 (aged 77)
- Place of death: Moscow, Soviet Union
- Height: 1.72 m (5 ft 8 in)
- Position: Defender

Youth career
- 1924–1926: CDKA

Senior career*
Years	Team	Apps	(Gls)
1926–1949	CDKA	153	(2)

Managerial career
- 1953: MVO
- 1954: CDSA
- * Club domestic league appearances and goals as of 14:02, 19 September 2025 (UTC) ‡ National team caps and goals as of 14:02, 19 September 2025 (UTC)

Konstantin Pavlovich Lyaskovskiy (Russian: Константин Павлович Лясковский 14 August 1908 – 20 January 1986) was a Soviet Russian professional footballer who plays as a defender for CDKA.

== Club career ==
Lyaskovskiy spent his whole playing career with CDKA (now CSKA Moscow) in the Soviet Top League from 1926 to 1949. He joined as a teenager, and became champion of Moscow in 1933 and 1935. At the end of the Second World War, he helped CDKA win consecutive championships from 1946 to 1948. He scored the goal that helped CDKA win their first ever Soviet Top League, in 1946. He played his last match in it on September 29, 1949, and at the age of 41 held the distinction as the oldest player ever in the Soviet Top League. He is one of the one-club men in association football with the longest tenures in their clubs. He was appointed assistant manager with CDKA in 1952, and had stints as manager with MVO and CDSA afterwards.

== Outside football ==
After his career in football, he worked with the Football Federation of the Soviet Union, and published articles in the press. He published a book "Shock Technique" in 1973. He died in Moscow on 20 January 1986, at the age of 77.

== Honours ==
CDKA

- Soviet Top League: 1946, 1947, 1948
- Soviet Cup: 1945, 1948

Individual

- Honored Master of Sports of the USSR
