= Boris Arkadyev =

Russian footballer

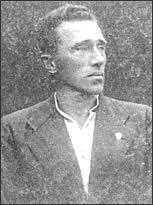

Personal information
- Full name: Boris Andreyevich Arkadyev
- Date of birth: 21 September 1899
- Place of birth: Narva, Russian Empire
- Date of death: 17 October 1986 (aged 87)
- Place of death: Moscow, Soviet Union
- Height: 1.72 m (5 ft 8 in)
- Position: Midfielder

Youth career
- 1914: Unitas Sankt Petersburg

Senior career*
Years	Team	Apps	(Gls)
1920–1922	Russkabel Moscow		
1923–1925	Sakharniki Moscow		
1926–1930	RkimA		
1931–1936	Metallurg Moscow		

Managerial career
- 1937–1939: Metallurg Moscow
- 1940–1944: Dynamo Moscow
- 1944–1952: CDSA Moscow
- 1952: USSR
- 1953–1957: Lokomotiv Moscow
- 1958–1959: CSK MO Moscow
- 1959: USSR (Olympics)
- 1961–1962: Neftyanık Baku
- 1963–1965: Lokomotiv Moscow
- 1967: Pakhtakor Tashkent
- 1968: Neftyanik Fergana
- 1969: Shinnik Yaroslavl
- * Club domestic league appearances and goals

Boris Andreyevich Arkadyev (Russian: Бори́с Андре́евич Арка́дьев; 21 September 1899 – 17 October 1986) was a Russian footballer and a coach. He became the first coach of the Soviet Union national football team. Merited Master of Sports of the USSR (1942), Merited Coach of the USSR (1957).

== Coaching career ==
Among teams of masters that he coached are included Metallurg Moscow (1937–1939), Dinamo Moscow (1940–1944), CDSA Moscow (1944–1952), Lokomotiv Moscow (1953–1957 and 1963–1965), CSK MO Moscow (1958–1959), Neftyanık Baku (1961–1962), Pakhtakor Tashkent (1967), Neftyanik Fergana (1968) and FC Shinnik Yaroslavl (1969).

He also was a coach of the Soviet Union Olympic football team in 1952. In 1952 he had his title Merited Master of Sports of the USSR stripped, but it was reinstated back in 1955.

Boris had a twin brother Vitaliy Arkadiev (1899–1987) who was Merited Coach of the USSR in fencing.

== Honours ==
=== Player ===
Metallurg Moscow

- Moscow Championship (2): 1932 (autumn), 1933 (autumn)

=== Manager ===
Dynamo Moscow

- Soviet Top League (1): 1940

CSKA Moscow

- Soviet Top League (5): 1946, 1947, 1948, 1950, 1951
- Soviet Cup (3): 1945, 1948, 1951

Lokomotiv Moscow

- Soviet Cup (1): 1957

== Awards ==
- Order of the Badge of Honour: 1957

== Managerial statistics ==
Team	From	To	Record							
Team	From	To	G	W	D	L	GF	GA	GD	Win %
Soviet Union	1952	1952	3	1	1	1	8	9	−1	33.33
Soviet Union (Olympic)	1959	1959	4	1	2	1	3	2	+1	25.00
Total			7	2	3	2	11	11	+0	28.57
