= Valentin Nikolayev (footballer) =

Soviet Russian footballer and coach

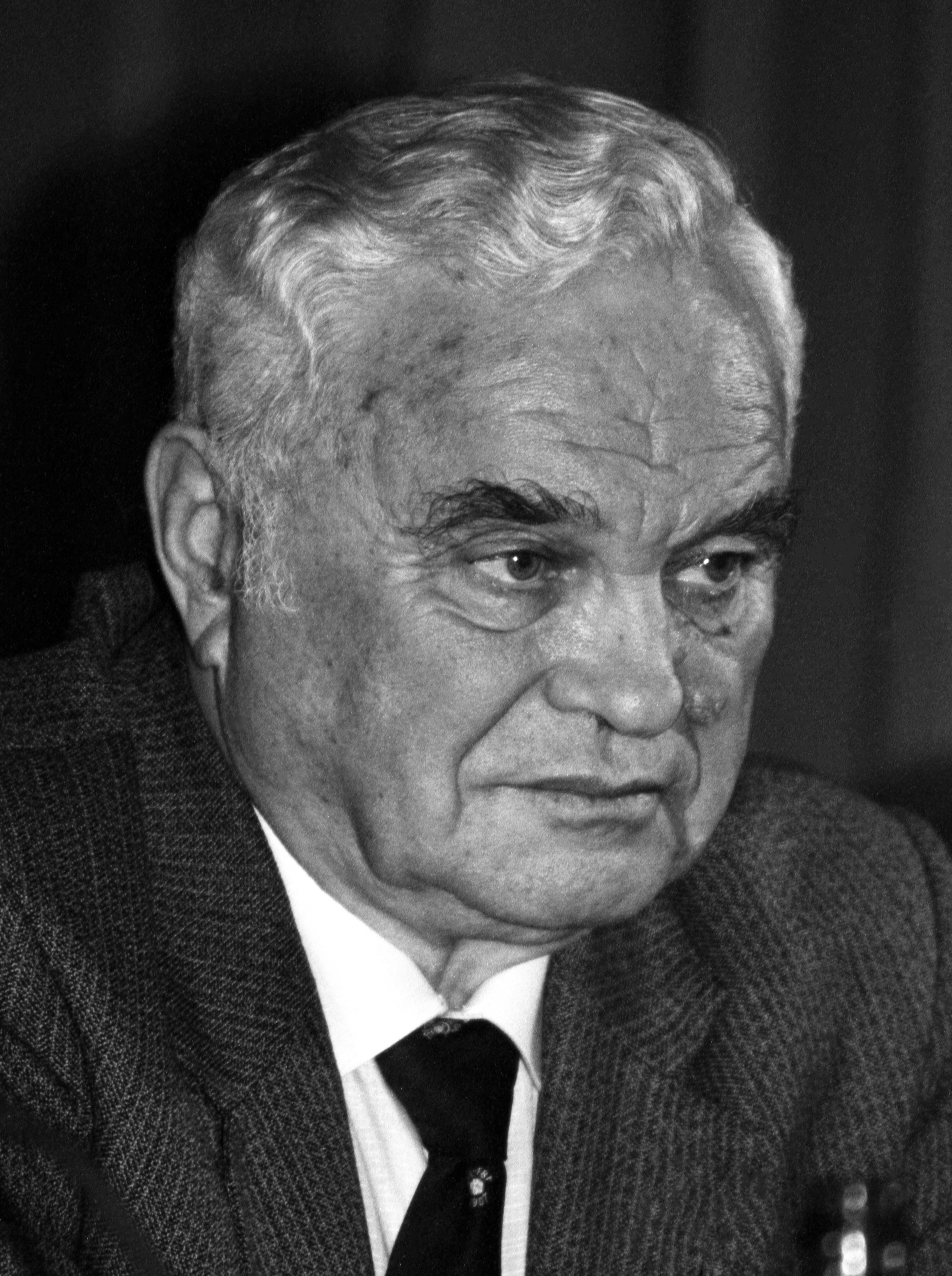

Personal information
- Full name: Valentin Aleksandrovich Nikolayev
- Date of birth: 16 August 1921
- Place of birth: Yerosovo, Vladimir Governorate, USSR
- Date of death: 9 October 2009 (aged 88)
- Place of death: Moscow
- Height: 1.72 m (5 ft 8 in)
- Position: Forward

Youth career
- Kazanka Moscow

Senior career*
Years	Team	Apps	(Gls)
1940–1952	CDKA Moscow	187	(79)
1952	Kalinin City Team	4	(2)
1953	MVO Moscow	0	

International career
1952	USSR	2	(0)

Managerial career
- 1964–1965: CSKA Moscow
- 1967–1968: SKA Khabarovsk
- 1970–1971: Soviet Union
- 1970–1973: CSKA Moscow
- 1974–1985: Soviet Union U-21
- * Club domestic league appearances and goals

Valentin Aleksandrovich Nikolayev (Russian: Валенти́н Алекса́ндрович Никола́ев; 16 August 1921 in Yerosovo, Vladimir Governorate – 9 October 2009 in Moscow) was a Soviet football player and coach.

== Honours ==
- Soviet Top League winner: 1946, 1947, 1948, 1950, 1951, 1970 (as manager).
- Soviet Top League runner-up: 1945, 1949.
- Soviet Top League bronze: 1964, 1965 (both as manager).
- Soviet Cup winner: 1945, 1948, 1951.
- Soviet Top League top scorer: 1946 (16 goals), 1947 (14 goals).
- Grigory Fedotov Club member: 111 goals.
- As a manager: Europe U-23 champion: 1976, Europe U-21 champion: 1980.

== International career ==
Nikolayev made his debut for USSR on July 20, 1952 in an Olympics game against Bulgaria. As a manager, he was in charge of USSR national football team from October 1970 until the end of 1971.
