= 1948 Soviet Top League =

11th season of top-tier football league in Soviet Union

Soviet Top League
- Season: 1948

14 teams took part in the league with CSKA Moscow winning the championship.

== League standings ==
Pos	Team	Pld	W	D	L	GF	GA	GD	Pts
1	CDKA Moscow	26	19	3	4	82	30	+52	41
2	Dynamo Moscow	26	18	4	4	85	28	+57	40
3	Spartak Moscow	26	18	1	7	64	34	+30	37
4	Dynamo Tbilisi	26	13	7	6	54	35	+19	33
5	Torpedo Moscow	26	15	3	8	58	43	+15	33
6	Dynamo Leningrad	26	10	5	11	42	47	−5	25
7	Lokomotiv Moscow	26	10	4	12	38	64	−26	24
8	Torpedo Stalingrad	26	7	7	12	28	44	−16	21
9	VVS Moscow	26	9	3	14	33	52	−19	21
10	Dynamo Kiev	26	7	6	13	32	50	−18	20
11	Krylia Sovetov Kuybyshev	26	5	9	12	22	40	−18	19
12	Dynamo Minsk	26	5	8	13	38	62	−24	18
13	Zenit Leningrad	26	4	9	13	29	48	−19	17
14	Krylia Sovetov Moscow	26	5	5	16	32	60	−28	15

Source: rsssf.com

== Results ==
Home \ Away	CDK	DYK	DLE	DMN	DYN	DTB	KRY	KSM	LOK	SPA	TOR	TST	VVS	ZEN
CDKA Moscow		6–1	2–1	2–2	3–2	4–2	5–1	7–0	7–1	2–1	4–3	4–2	0–3	0–1
Dynamo Kiev	0–5		3–2	1–1	0–4	3–1	1–0	3–2	3–2	0–2	1–4	1–1	5–1	1–1
Dynamo Leningrad	1–1	3–1		2–2	1–1	1–5	3–0	4–1	3–4	4–1	2–1	1–2	1–1	4–2
Dynamo Minsk	1–4	4–2	1–2		0–4	0–3	2–2	1–1	2–2	4–3	1–2	1–1	0–2	2–0
Dynamo Moscow	2–2	0–0	5–0	5–0		4–2	2–2	4–2	3–0	5–1	1–2	4–3	4–2	3–0
Dynamo Tbilisi	1–0	1–1	1–1	2–0	1–3		2–0	1–1	9–2	2–0	3–1	2–2	4–1	2–1
Krylia Sovetov Kuybyshev	1–3	1–0	0–1	3–0	1–0	0–0		1–0	0–1	0–1	0–1	0–0	3–2	1–1
Krylia Sovetov Moscow	0–2	2–4	2–0	2–3	0–3	0–1	1–1		3–1	0–3	2–0	3–1	0–1	3–0
Lokomotiv Moscow	0–5	1–0	1–2	2–0	1–5	1–0	1–1	3–0		1–5	2–1	1–1	2–0	2–6
Spartak Moscow	2–0	1–0	2–1	3–2	3–0	1–1	7–1	4–2	2–1		4–1	2–0	3–0	0–4
Torpedo Moscow	2–3	2–1	3–0	5–1	0–7	6–2	2–2	3–3	4–1	1–0		3–0	3–1	2–1
Torpedo Stalingrad	0–4	1–0	3–1	3–1	1–5	0–0	1–0	2–1	1–2	0–3	0–2		0–1	1–1
VVS Moscow	0–3	2–0	2–0	1–4	0–6	1–2	3–1	6–0	0–0	1–6	0–3	1–0		1–1
Zenit Leningrad	0–4	0–0	0–1	3–3	1–3	1–4	0–0	1–1	1–3	1–4	1–1	0–2	1–0	

Legend: Blue = home team win; Yellow = draw; Red = away team win.

== Top scorers ==
25 goals

- Sergei Solovyov (Dynamo Moscow)

23 goals

- Vsevolod Bobrov (CDKA Moscow)

19 goals

- Aleksandr Ponomarev (Torpedo Moscow)

16 goals

- Aleksandr Obotov (Lokomotiv Moscow)

15 goals

- Ivan Konov (Spartak Moscow)

14 goals

- Vladimir Dyomin (CDKA Moscow)

13 goals

- Grigory Fedotov (CDKA Moscow)

11 goals

- Konstantin Beskov (Dynamo Moscow)
- Boris Chuchelov (Spartak Moscow)
- Gaioz Jejelava (Dinamo Tbilisi)
- Aleksei Grinin (CDKA Moscow)
- Boris Tsybin (Dynamo Leningrad)
