= Grinin =

Grinin (Russian: Гринин) is a Russian masculine surname, its feminine counterpart is Grinina. It may refer to

- Aleksey Grinin (1919–1988), Russian football striker and coach
- Leonid Grinin (born 1958), Russian philosopher of history, sociologist and political anthropologist
- Vladimir Grinin (born 1947), Russian diplomat
