= Andrey Starostin =

Soviet footballer (1906–1987)

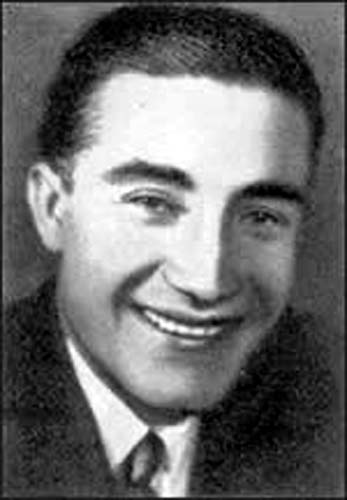

Andrey Petrovich Starostin (Russian: Андре́й Петро́вич Ста́ростин; 24 October 1906 – 22 October 1987) was a Soviet football player and author. Honoured Master of Sport of the USSR (1940).

He was head of the USSR team (1960–1964, 1968–1970) and Chairman of the Federation of Moscow football (1971–1987).

== Early life ==
Starostin was born in Moscow, Russian Empire in 1906, and was fascinated by football from an early age. In 1916 at the age of ten he made his way, alone, across Moscow, to watch OLLS Moscow play at their football ground in Sokolniki Park. He started playing in 1922, in Moscow in the club team of the MKS.

== Career ==
He played for clubs in Moscow Krasnaya Presnya (1923–1925), Pisheviki (1926–1930), Cooperatsiya (1931, 1934), Ducat (1932–1933), Spartak (1935–1942, captain team in 1937–1940).

Starostin was RSFSR Champion 1931 Champion of the USSR in 1935 (5 games, 1 goal), 1936 (Fall), 1938 and 1939. He was the second prize winner of the USSR championship in 1937, the third prize winner – 1936 (c) and 1940. In the USSR championships he played 93 matches and made 4 goals.

He was the winner of the USSR Cup in 1938 and 1939.

He played for the national team of Moscow – 1933–40, RSFSR – 1931–34. For the USSR national team played he played 10 informal matches from 1932 to 1935 respectively, all against the Turkey national team.

He played as a midfielder in hockey and was on the Moscow team from 1929 to 1935. 2nd prize winner of the USSR championship in 1935. He was champion of the RSFSR in 1932, 1927 and 1934 and Champion of Moscow 1928.

He was arrested in 1942 and sent to Norillag.

He entered in the all-time team of the USSR for 50 years (1967).

He wrote various books, including Big Football (Wiley), 1957, 1959, 1964), The Story of Football (Wiley, 1973), Meetings on the Football Orbit (Wiley, 1978, 1980), The Flagship of Football (M., 1988).

Starostin died in Moscow in 1987 and was buried in the Vagankovo Cemetery.

== Awards and honours ==
- Order of the Badge of Honour (22 July 1937)
- Honoured Master of Sport of the USSR (1940)
- Order of Friendship of Peoples (1980)
- Order of the Red Banner of Labour (1985)
