= Mingiyan Badmayev =

Russian footballer (born 2007)

Personal information
- Full name: Mingiyan Badmayevich Badmayev
- Date of birth: 28 June 2007 (age 19)
- Place of birth: Elista, Kalmykia, Russia
- Height: 1.87 m (6 ft 2 in)
- Position: Centre-back

Team information
- Current team: CSKA Moscow
- Number: 67

Youth career
- Uralan Elista
- –2024: Volgar Astrakhan
- 2024–: CSKA Moscow

Senior career*
Years	Team	Apps	(Gls)
2026–	CSKA Moscow	1	(0)

International career^{‡}
2022–2023	Russia U16	8	(0)
2023	Russia U17	1	(0)
2024	Russia U18	3	(1)
- * Club domestic league appearances and goals as of 17 May 2026 ‡ National team caps and goals as of 13 October 2024

Mingiyan Badmayevich Badmayev (Russian: Мингиян Бадмаевич Бадмаев; born 28 June 2007) is a Russian football player who plays as a centre-back for CSKA Moscow.

== Career ==
Badmayev made his debut in the Russian Premier League for CSKA Moscow on 17 May 2026 in a game against Lokomotiv Moscow.

== Career statistics ==
As of 17 May 2026

Club	Season	League			Cup		Total	
Club	Season	Division	Apps	Goals	Apps	Goals	Apps	Goals
CSKA Moscow	2025–26	Russian Premier League	1	0	0	0	1	0
Career total			1	0	0	0	1	0
