= Gennadi Kostylev =

Russian football coach (born 1940)

Personal information
- Full name: Gennadi Ivanovich Kostylev
- Date of birth: 27 September 1940 (age 86)
- Place of birth: Kostyantynivka, Stalino Oblast, Ukrainian SSR
- Position: Midfielder

Youth career
- FShM Moscow

Senior career*
Years	Team	Apps	(Gls)
1958	FC Trud Lytkarino		
1958–1959	FC Energiya Volzhsky	23	(1)
1960–1963	FC Zenit Izhevsk		
1964–1966	FC Volga Gorky	105	(7)
1967–1970	FC Zenit Izhevsk		

Managerial career
- 1974–1975: FC Zenit Izhevsk
- 1978: FC Zvezda Perm (assistant)
- 1980–1982: FC Stroitel Cherepovets
- 1983: FC Rubin Kazan
- 1984–1991: USSR youth national teams
- 1992: PFC CSKA Moscow (assistant)
- 1992–1993: PFC CSKA Moscow
- 1996: FC Arsenal Tula
- 1997–1998: PFC CSKA Moscow (assistant)
- 1998: FC Irtysh Omsk
- 1999: FC Torpedo-ZIL Moscow (assistant)
- 2000–2001: FC Rotor Volgograd (assistant)
- 2001: FC Krasnoznamensk
- 2003: FC Titan Moscow
- 2004: FC Saturn Ramenskoye (assistant)
- 2005–2006: FC Saturn Yegoryevsk
- 2009–2010: FC Moscow (reserves)
- * Club domestic league appearances and goals

Gennadi Ivanovich Kostylev (Russian: Геннадий Иванович Костылев; born 27 September 1940) is a Russian professional football coach and a former player.

== Honours ==
- Russian Second Division Zone Center best manager: 2005.
