= Sergei Shaposhnikov =

Russian footballer and coach (1923–2021)

Personal information
- Full name: Sergei Iosifovich Shaposhnikov
- Date of birth: 8 March 1923
- Place of birth: Petrograd, Russian SFSR, Soviet Union
- Date of death: 22 June 2021 (aged 98)
- Place of death: Moscow, Russia
- Height: 1.70 m (5 ft 7 in)
- Position: Forward

Youth career
- LVO Leningrad

Senior career*
Years	Team	Apps	(Gls)
1945–1946	DKA Khabarovsk		
1947–1949	CDKA Moscow	4	(0)

Managerial career
- 1946: DKA Khabarovsk (assistant)
- 1952–1960: SKA Odesa
- 1961–1965: SKA Lviv
- 1966–1967: CSKA Moscow
- 1968–1970: Chornomorets Odesa
- 1972: Nistru Chişinău
- 1972: FC Kairat
- 1974–1977: SC Tavriya Simferopol
- 1979: CSKA Moscow
- 1983: CSKA Moscow
- 1987–1988: CSKA Moscow
- * Club domestic league appearances and goals

Sergei Iosifovich Shaposhnikov (Russian: Сергей Иосифович Шапошников; 8 March 1923 – 22 June 2021) was a Russian football player and coach.

Shaposhnikov was born in Petrograd, and died on 22 June 2021 at the age of 98.
