= Mikhail Rushchinsky =

Soviet footballer and manager

Personal information
- Full name: Mikhail Osipovich Rushchinsky
- Date of birth: 17 January 1895
- Place of birth: Moscow, Russia
- Date of death: 22 March 1942 (aged 47)
- Place of death: Moscow, USSR
- Position: Defender

Senior career*
| Years | Team | Apps | (Gls) |
| 1915–1922 | SKZ Moscow | | |
| 1923–1924 | Yakht-Klub Raykomvoda Moscow | | |
| 1925 | MSFK Moscow | | |
| 1926–1930 | Tryokhgorka Moscow | | |
| 1931 | AMO Moscow | | |

International career
| 1924–1925 | USSR | 2 | (0) |

Managerial career
- 1937–1939: CSKA Moscow
- * Club domestic league appearances and goals

Mikhail Osipovich Rushchinsky (Russian: Михаил Осипович Рущинский) (born 17 January 1895 in Moscow; died 22 March 1942 in Moscow) was a Soviet football player and manager.

== Honours ==
- RSFSR champion: 1920, 1928.
- USSR champion: 1920, 1928.

== International career ==
Rushchinsky made his debut for USSR on 16 November 1924 in a friendly against Turkey.
