= All-Union Committee of Physical Culture and Sports Tournament =

The All-Union Committee of Physical Culture and Sports Tournament was a single-season official tournament held in 1952 under the aegis of the Soviet Football Section (predecessor of the Football Federation of the Soviet Union) and was conducted for Class A teams of masters. On 6 January 1952, at the Soviet Football Section session, it was decided to hold the tournament. The main goal was to help with the preparation of the Soviet Union national football team for the 1952 Summer Olympics in Helsinki.

The tournament consisted of two stages: preliminary and final. The preliminary stage was played in the second half of April in four groups (Kiev, Tbilisi, Baku, and Kharkiv) in one round. The two best teams from each group went to the final stage in Moscow in May-June 1952. In the tournament preliminary phase, two Moscow city teams also competed, while in the final stage, they were consolidated. Officially, the Moscow city teams were competing outside of the tournament, and their results did not count against the other teams of masters.

The winner of the tournament was CDSA Moscow.

== Results ==
=== Preliminary stage ===
==== Kharkiv ====
??.04.1952 Krylia Sovetov Kuybyshev - MVO Kalinin 2-0

20.04.1952 Dynamo Moscow - Torpedo Moscow 2-1

??.04.1952 Krylia Sovetov Kuybyshev - Torpedo Moscow 3-2

24.04.1952 Dynamo Moscow - MVO Kalinin 2-1

??.04.1952 Torpedo Moscow - MVO Kalinin 0-1

28.04.1952 Krylia Sovetov Kuybyshev - Dynamo Moscow 1-0

Team	Pld	W	D	L	GF	GA	GD	Pts
Krylia Sovetov Kuybyshev	3	3	0	0	6	2	+4	6
Dynamo Moscow	3	2	0	1	4	3	+1	4
MVO Kalinin	3	1	0	2	2	4	-2	2
Torpedo Moscow	3	0	0	3	3	6	-3	0

==== Kiev ====
??.04.1952 Dynamo Kiev - Dynamo Leningrad 1-1

18.04.1952 CDSA Moscow - Lokomotiv Moscow 3-0

??.04.1952 Dynamo Kiev - Lokomotiv Moscow 2-1

23.04.1952 Dynamo Leningrad - CDSA Moscow 2-0

??.04.1952 Lokomotiv Moscow - Dynamo Leningrad 1-2

27.04.1952 Dynamo Kiev - CDSA Moscow 0-2

Team	Pld	W	D	L	GF	GA	GD	Pts
Dynamo Leningrad	3	2	1	0	5	2	+3	5
CDSA Moscow	3	2	0	1	5	2	+3	4
Dynamo Kiev	3	1	1	1	3	4	-1	3
Lokomotiv Moscow	3	0	0	3	2	7	-5	0

==== Baku ====
??.04.1952 Shakhtyor Stalino - Dinamo Minsk 0-1

19.04.1952 Spartak Moscow - Daugava Riga 2-0

??.04.1952 Shakhtyor Stalino - Daugava Riga 1-0

24.04.1952 Dinamo Minsk - Spartak Moscow 0-0

??.04.1952 Dinamo Minsk - Daugava Riga 2-1

27.04.1952 Spartak Moscow - Shakhtyor Stalino 3-1

Team	Pld	W	D	L	GF	GA	GD	Pts
Spartak Moscow	3	2	1	0	5	1	+4	5
Dinamo Minsk	3	2	1	0	3	1	+2	5
Shakhtyor Stalino	3	1	0	2	2	4	-2	2
Daugava Riga	3	0	0	3	1	5	-4	0

==== Tbilisi ====
14.04.1952 Dynamo Tbilisi - Zenit Leningrad 0-2

21.04.1952 Dynamo Tbilisi - VVS Moscow 1-3

27.04.1952 VVS Moscow - Zenit Leningrad 2-1

Team	Pld	W	D	L	GF	GA	GD	Pts
VVS Moscow	2	2	0	0	5	2	+3	4
Zenit Leningrad	2	1	0	1	3	2	+1	2
Dynamo Tbilisi	2	0	0	2	1	5	-4	0

- Moscow-1: vs VVS - 1:0, vs Zenit - 3:2, vs Dinamo Tb - 3:0, vs Moscow-2 - x
- Moscow-2: vs VVS - 0:0, vs Zenit - 6:1, vs Dinamo Tb - 0:0, vs Moscow-1 - x

=== Final stage ===
==== Moscow ====
08.05.1952 CDSA Moscow - Dynamo Moscow 2-1

10.05.1952 VVS Moscow - Spartak Moscow 2-2

13.05.1952 Dynamo Moscow - Dinamo Minsk 4-0

16.05.1952 Spartak Moscow - Krylia Sovetov Kuybyshev 1-1

20.05.1952 CDSA Moscow - Zenit Leningrad 0-0

21.05.1952 Dynamo Moscow - VVS Moscow 1-0

25.05.1952 Dynamo Leningrad - Spartak Moscow 1-1

29.05.1952 CDSA Moscow - Krylia Sovetov Kuybyshev 1-2

30.05.1952 Dynamo Moscow - Spartak Moscow 2-2

03.06.1952 CDSA Moscow - Dinamo Minsk 2-1

08.06.1952 Zenit Leningrad - Spartak Moscow 4-3

10.06.1952 CDSA Moscow - Dynamo Leningrad 1-0

13.06.1952 Spartak Moscow - Dinamo Minsk 4-1

17.06.1952 CDSA Moscow - VVS Moscow 1-1

17.06.1952 Dynamo Leningrad - Dynamo Moscow 3-2

25.06.1952 CDSA Moscow - Spartak Moscow 4-2

26.07.1952 Dynamo Moscow - Krylia Sovetov Kuybyshev 3-2

??.??.1952 Krylia Sovetov Kuybyshev - Dynamo Leningrad 2-1

??.??.1952 Krylia Sovetov Kuybyshev - Dinamo Minsk 4-2

??.??.1952 Krylia Sovetov Kuybyshev - Zenit Leningrad 1-1

??.??.1952 Krylia Sovetov Kuybyshev - VVS Moscow 1-3

??.??.1952 Dynamo Leningrad - Dinamo Minsk 1-0

??.??.1952 Dynamo Leningrad - Zenit Leningrad 3-3

??.??.1952 Dynamo Leningrad - VVS Moscow 1-1

??.??.1952 Zenit Leningrad - Dinamo Minsk 3-0

??.??.1952 Zenit Leningrad - VVS Moscow 0-1

??.??.1952 Dinamo Minsk - VVS Moscow 1-3

??.??.1952 Dynamo Moscow - Zenit Leningrad (canceled)

Team	Pld	W	D	L	GF	GA	GD	Pts
CDSA Moscow	7	4	2	1	11	7	+4	10
VVS Moscow	7	3	3	1	11	7	+4	9
Krylia Sovetov Kuybyshev	7	3	2	2	13	12	+1	8
Dynamo Moscow	6	3	1	2	13	9	+4	7
Zenit Leningrad	6	2	3	1	11	8	+3	7
Dynamo Leningrad	7	2	3	2	10	10	0	7
Spartak Moscow	7	1	4	2	15	15	0	6
Dinamo Minsk	7	0	0	7	5	21	-16	0

- Moscow: vs CDSA - 2:0; vs Spartak - 0:1; vs Krylia Sovetov - 2:0; vs Dinamo L - 0:2
