= Kirill Danilov =

Russian footballer (born 2007)

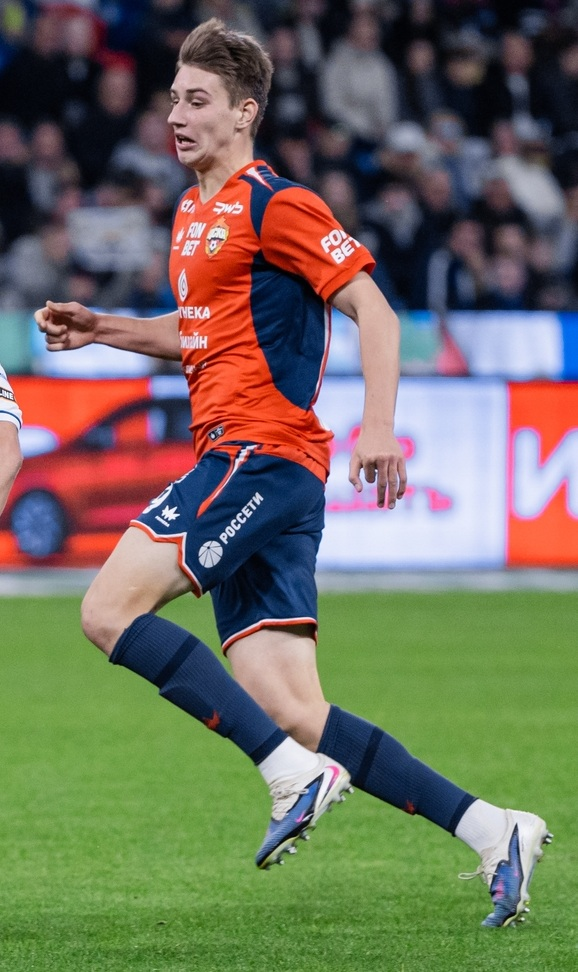
- Danilov with CSKA Moscow in 2026

Personal information
- Full name: Kirill Igorevich Danilov
- Date of birth: 12 August 2007 (age 19)
- Place of birth: Sochi, Russia
- Height: 1.97 m (6 ft 6 in)
- Position: Centre-back

Team information
- Current team: CSKA Moscow
- Number: 79

Youth career
- CSKA Moscow

Senior career*
Years	Team	Apps	(Gls)
2025–	CSKA Moscow	25	(1)

International career^{‡}
2025	Russia U18	2	(0)
2025–	Russia U19	5	(0)
2026–	Russia	4	(0)
- * Club domestic league appearances and goals as of 21 November 2026 ‡ National team caps and goals as of 17 November 2026

Kirill Igorevich Danilov (Russian: Кирилл Игоревич Данилов; born 12 August 2007) is a Russian football player who plays as a centre-back for CSKA Moscow and the Russia national team.

== Club career ==
Danilov was raised in the youth system of CSKA Moscow. He made his debut in the Russian Premier League for CSKA on 1 March 2026 in a game against Akhmat Grozny, as a starter. On 3 March 2026, Danilov extended his CSKA contract to January 2030.

== International career ==
Danilov was first called up to the senior Russia national football team in May 2026 for a series of friendlies. He made his debut on 5 June 2026 against Burkina Faso.

== Career statistics ==
=== Club ===
As of 21 November 2026

Club	Season	League			Cup		Total	
Club	Season	Division	Apps	Goals	Apps	Goals	Apps	Goals
CSKA Moscow	2025–26	Russian Premier League	11	0	4	0	15	0
CSKA Moscow	2026–27	Russian Premier League	14	1	2	0	16	1
CSKA Moscow	Total		25	1	6	0	31	1
Career total			25	1	6	0	31	1

=== International ===
As of match played 17 November 2026

Appearances and goals by national team and year
National team	Year	Apps	Goals
Russia	2026	4	0
Total		4	0
