= Yuri Chesnokov (footballer) =

Soviet footballer

Personal information
- Full name: Yuri Ivanovich Chesnokov
- Date of birth: 25 January 1952
- Place of birth: Kimry, USSR
- Date of death: 20 November 1999 (aged 47)
- Place of death: Moscow, Russia
- Position: Forward

Senior career*
Years	Team	Apps	(Gls)
1970–1971	Volga Kalinin		
1972–1974	FC Lokomotiv Moscow	100	(62)
1975–1983	CSKA Moscow	252	(72)
1993	FC Sputnik Kimry		

International career
1976–1979	USSR	13	(5)
- * Club domestic league appearances and goals

Yuri Ivanovich Chesnokov (Russian: Юрий Иванович Чесноков; 25 January 1952 – 20 November 1999) was a Soviet football player.

== Honours ==
- Grigory Fedotov Club member.

== International career ==
Chesnokov made his debut for USSR on 28 November 1976 in a friendly against Argentina. He played in UEFA Euro 1980 qualifiers (USSR did not qualify for the final tournament).
