= Vladimir Fedotov =

Russian footballer

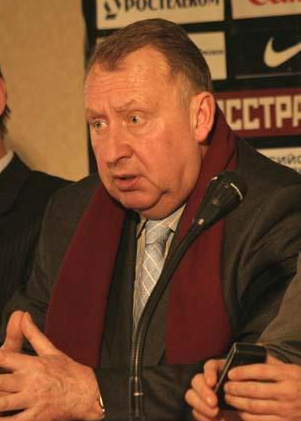

Personal information
- Full name: Vladimir Grigoryevich Fedotov
- Date of birth: 18 January 1943
- Place of birth: Moscow, Russian SFSR, Soviet Union
- Date of death: 29 March 2009 (aged 66)
- Place of death: Moscow, Russia
- Height: 1.74 m (5 ft 9 in)
- Position: Striker

Youth career
- FShM Moscow

Senior career*
Years	Team	Apps	(Gls)
1960–1975	CSKA	382	(92)

International career
1970–1974	Soviet Union	22	(4)

Managerial career
- 1978–1980: CSKA Moscow (assistant)
- 1981–1982: SKA Rostov-on-Don
- 1984: CSKA Moscow (assistant)
- 1986–1987: SKA Rostov-on-Don
- 1990–1992: Asmaral Moscow
- 1992–1993: Muharraq
- 1993: Spartak Vladikavkaz (caretaker)
- 1994: Dynamo Moscow (assistant)
- 1995–1996: CSKA Moscow (assistant)
- 1998: Metallurg Lipetsk
- 1998–1999: Sokol Saratov
- 1999: Chernomorets Novorossiysk
- 2000: Levski Sofia
- 2001: Arsenal Tula
- 2002–2003: Spartak Moscow (assistant)
- 2003: Spartak Moscow (caretaker)
- 2004–2006: Spartak Moscow (technical director)
- 2004: Spartak Moscow (sports director)
- 2006: Spartak Moscow (vice-president)
- 2006–2007: Spartak Moscow
- 2007–2008: FC Moscow (sports director)
- * Club domestic league appearances and goals

Vladimir Grigoryevich Fedotov (Russian: Владимир Григорьевич Федотов; 18 January 1943 – 29 March 2009) was a Soviet and Russian football striker and manager who holds the all-time record of caps for CSKA Moscow. He was the son of famous Soviet football and ice hockey player Grigory Fedotov.

== Career ==
His only professional club was CSKA (1960–1975, 382 matches and 92 goals in the Soviet Top League); also he made 22 appearances for the Soviet Union national team between 1970 and 1975, scoring 4 goals. After Fedotov ended his playing career, he became a manager.
