= Yevgeni Giner =

Ukrainian-born Russian businessman

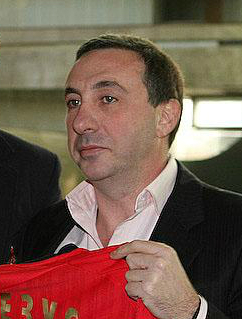

Evgeniy Lennorovich Giner (Russian: Евге́ний Ленно́рович Ги́нер; born May 26, 1960) is a Russian businessman, since February 2001 the president of PFC CSKA Moscow, head of the Financial Committee of Russian Football Union.

== Biography ==
With Giner CSKA won five championships in Russia (2003, 2005, 2006, 2012/2013, 2013/2014), seven Russian Cups (2002, 2005, 2006, 2008, 2009, 2011, 2013), six Super Bowls Russia (2004, 2006, 2007, 2009, 2013, 2014) and the UEFA Cup (2005), reached the stage of the Champions League 1/4 final (2009/2010).

Together with the Russian politician Alexander Babakov and Mikhail Voevodin, he is a co-owner of the company VS Energy, which owns several regional energy companies and a hotel business in Ukraine. The total revenue of the energy business group for 2014 exceeded ₴13 billion, which is about one-third of the market of electricity transmission by local networks in the country.
