= Yerosovo =

Yerosovo Еросово
- Village
- Location within Vladimir Oblast Location within Russia
- Coordinates: 56°06′N 40°04′E
- Country: Russia
- Region: Vladimir Oblast
- District: Sobinsky District
- Time zone: UTC+3:00

Yerosovo (Russian: Еросово) is a rural locality (a village) in Vorshinskoye Rural Settlement, Sobinsky District, Vladimir Oblast, Russia. The population was 22 as of 2010.

== Geography ==
Yerosovo is located on the Koloksha River, 28 km northeast of Sobinka (the district's administrative centre) by road. Astafyevo is the nearest rural locality.
