= Grigory Fedotov =

Russian footballer (1916–1957)

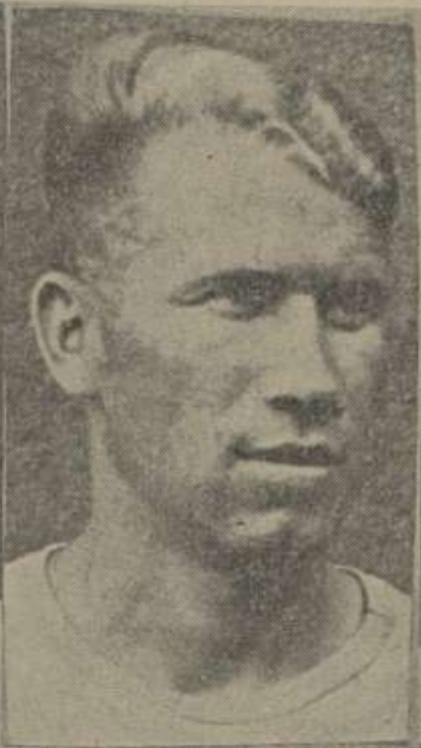

Personal information
- Full name: Grigory Ivanovich Fedotov
- Date of birth: 29 March 1916
- Place of birth: Bogorodsk, Russian Empire
- Date of death: 8 December 1957 (aged 41)
- Place of death: Moscow, Russian SFSR, Soviet Union
- Position: Forward

Senior career*
Years	Team	Apps	(Gls)
1934–1937	FC Serp i Molot Moscow		
1938–1949	CSKA Moscow	155	(124)
- * Club domestic league appearances and goals

Grigory Ivanovich Fedotov (29 March 1916 – 8 December 1957) was a Russian and Soviet professional football player and manager who played as a forward.

== Personal life ==
His son was fellow player Vladimir Fedotov.
