= Vladimir Agapov =

Soviet footballer and coach (1933–2024)

Personal information
- Full name: Vladimir Mikhailovich Agapov
- Date of birth: 18 November 1933
- Place of birth: Moscow, Russian SFSR, USSR
- Date of death: 21 May 2024 (aged 90)
- Position: Striker

Youth career
- 1951–1952: Spartak Moscow

Senior career*
Years	Team	Apps	(Gls)
1953–1954	Spartak Moscow	14	(2)
1955–1956	CDSA Moscow	44	(13)
1957–1959	CSK MO Moscow	44	(9)
1960	CSKA Moscow	1	(0)
1961	Anhalt Nauen		
1963–1966	Zvezda Serpukhov		

International career
1958	USSR	1	(0)

Managerial career
- 1973–1974: CSKA Moscow
- 1978: CSKA Moscow (director)
- * Club domestic league appearances and goals

Vladimir Mikhailovich Agapov (Russian: Владимир Михайлович Агапов; 18 November 1933 – 21 May 2024) was a Soviet football player and coach. He died on 21 May 2024, at the age of 90.

== International career ==
Agapov played his only game for USSR on 30 August 1958 in a friendly against Czechoslovakia.

== Honours ==
- Soviet Top League: 1953
- Soviet Cup: 1955
