= Vladimir Dyomin =

Russian football player and coach

Personal information
- Date of birth: 10 March 1921
- Place of birth: Aleskino, Russia
- Date of death: 10 October 1966 (aged 45)
- Place of death: Moscow, Russia
- Position: Forward

Youth career
- 1937–1938: Spartak Moscow

Senior career*
Years	Team	Apps	(Gls)
1939–1944	Spartak Moscow		
1944–1952	CDKA Moscow		
1952–1954	Kalinin City		
1954	CDSA Moscow		

Managerial career
- 1958: ODO Lviv
- * Club domestic league appearances and goals

Vladimir Timofeevich Dyomin (Russian: Владимир Тимофеевич Дёмин; 10 March 1921 – 10 October 1966) was a Russian football player and coach.

== Career ==
Dyomin was born in Aleskino, Ryazan Governorate, Russian SFSR. He started playing as a striker in 1935 in a children's team in Moscow, then in 1937–1938 in the junior team Spartak Moscow. In 1939, he made his debut in the starting line of the senior team of Spartak Moscow. In 1944, he moved to CDKA Moscow and from 1947 he served as team captain. In September 1952, he joined the Kalinin city team. In 1954, he finished his playing career in the reborn CDSA Moscow.

On 27 May 1952, he made his debut in the Soviet Union team in an unofficial match against Hungary (2–1). After retiring he became a football coach, and in the years 1955–1957 and from June 1958 to October 1966, he worked the CSKA Moscow football academy. From January to May 1958, he led ODO Lviv. He was champion of the USSR in 1939, 1946, 1947, 1948, 1950, 1951 and winner of the USSR Cup in 1945, 1948 and 1951.

He became ill with tuberculosis and was treated in a clinic near Moscow. But ignoring the recommendations of doctors, he died on 10 October 1966 in Moscow.
