= OLLS Moscow =

OLLS Moscow was the popular name of the Amateur Society of Skiing Sports (Russian: Общество Любителей Лыжного Спорта, abbreviated to OLLS) established in 1901.. In 1911 it established its own football team, one of the first in Imperial Russia.

Andrei Starostin, who became a major figure in the development of football in the Soviet Union, later recounted the allure of the letters "OLLS" had for him as a child and how in 1916 at the age of ten he crossed Moscow on his own to attend a game at their stadium in Sokolniki Park.
