= Aleksey Grinin =

Russian footballer and coach

Aleksey Grigorievich Grinin (Russian: Алексе́й Григо́рьевич Гри́нин; 21 August 1919 – 1 July 1988) was a Russian football striker and a football coach.

Grinin was born in Ozerki. In 1934, he began his football career at the factory team Oziory, and then in the youth team of Dinamo Moscow. In 1938, he made his debut in the starting line of Dinamo. In 1939, he went to the military club CSKA Moscow. From 1947 he served as team captain. In September 1952, he joined the Kalinin city team, but in the next year he returned to Moscow. In May 1953, Aleksey ended his playing career.

After retiring, he became a football coach. In the years 1954–1957 he led ODO Lviv. He also managed the club SKA Novosibirsk from July 1963 to November 1964, Terek Grozny (1965), Kayrat Alma-Ata from January to September 1967 and Krylya Sovetov Moscow (1968–1970). In 1974, he helped train CSKA Moscow. In addition, in the years 1958–1962, 1971–1973, and 1975–1988 he taught at the CSKA Moscow football academy. He was Champion of the USSR (1946, 1947, 1948, 1950, 1951) and USSR Cup winner (1945, 1948, 1951). He died on 1 July 1988, in Moscow.
