= 1992–93 Russian Cup =

Tournament details
- Country: Russia

Final positions
- Champions: Torpedo Moscow
- Runners-up: CSKA

The 1992–93 Russian Cup was the first ever season of the Russian football knockout tournament since the dissolution of Soviet Union.

== First round ==
Team 1	Score	Team 2
2 May 1992
Energiya Chaykovsky	3–0	Gornyak Kachkanar
Torpedo Arzamas	w/o	Olimpia Kirovo-Chepetsk
Zarya Krotovka	3–1	Zenit Penza
KATs-Skif Naberezhnye Chelny	4–1	Torpedo-UdGu Izhevsk
Skat-5s Yelabuga	2–0	Elektron Vyatskiye Polyany
Khimik Dzerzhinsk	w/o	Sibir Kurgan
Idel Kazan	1–2	Gazovik Izhevsk
MGU Saransk	w/o	EVM Ruzayevka
Metallurg Magnitogorsk	1–0	Avtopribor Oktyabrsky
Sodovik Sterlitamak	2–1	Gazovik Orenburg
Znamya Arzamas	w/o	Azamat Cheboksary
Torpedo Pavlovo	2–1	Tekstilshchik Isheyevka
Zenit Chelyabinsk	5–0	Metallurg Novotroitsk
Bashselmash Neftekamsk	w/o	Neftekhimik Nizhnekamsk
Shakhtyor Artyom	1–1 (a.e.t.) (2–3 p)	Metallurg Aldan
Kuzbass Kemerovo	2–1	Tom Tomsk
Irtysh Omsk	w/o	Dynamo Yakutsk
Neftyanik Uray	w/o	Agan Raduzhny
Selenga Ulan-Ude	2–1 (a.e.t.)	Aleks Angarsk
Spartak Gorno-Altaysk	3–1	Progress Biysk
Torpedo Rubtsovsk	1–0	Dynamo Kemerovo
Gornyak Gramoteino	0–1	Zarya Leninsk-Kuznetsky

== Second round ==
Team 1	Score	Team 2
15 April 1992
SKA Rostov-on-Don	1–0	Rostselmash Rostov-on-Don (reserves)
18 April 1992
Erzu Grozny	3–0	Urartu Grozny
Anzhi Makhachkala	5–0	Vaynakh Shali
Beshtau Lermontov	2–3	Lokomotiv Mineralnye Vody
Etalon Baksan	1–2	Avtodor-Olaf Vladikavkaz
Mashuk Pyatigorsk	0–2 (a.e.t.)	Dynamo Izobilny
Astrateks Astrakhan	2–1	Kaspiy Kaspiysk
Volgar Astrakhan	w/o	Altair-Khelling Derbent
Iskra Novoaleksandrovsk	2–1	Venets Gulkevichi
Khimik Belorechensk	2–2 (a.e.t.) (4–3 p)	Kuban Barannikovsky
Druzhba Budyonnovsk	0–2	Kavkazkabel Prokhladny
Niva Slavyansk-na-Kubani	w/o	Kolos Krasnodar
Start Yeysk	w/o	Torpedo Adler
Pele Moscow	w/o	Zarya Kaluga
Metallurg Krasny Sulin	0–1	Shakhtyor Shakhty
Dynamo Bryansk	2–0	Avangard Kursk
Zvezda-Rus Gorodishche	w/o	Spartak Tambov
Irgiz Balakovo	1–0 (a.e.t.)	Avangard Kamyshin
Kinotavr Podolsk	2–3	CSKA Moscow (reserves)
TRASKO Moscow	2–1	Presnya Moscow
Lokomotiv Moscow (reserves)	1–5	Spartak Moscow (reserves)
Aleks Gatchina	w/o	Karelia Petrozavodsk
Smena-Saturn Saint Petersburg	3–1	Kosmos-Kirovets Saint Petersburg
Progress Chernyakhovsk	0–1 (a.e.t.)	Baltika Kaliningrad
Lokomotiv Saint Petersburg	0–2	Biosvyaz-Student Saint Petersburg
Zvolma-Spartak Kostroma	1–0	Volzhanin Kineshma
Volochanin Vyshny Volochyok	1–0	Sputnik Kimry
Vympel Rybinsk	1–1 (a.e.t.) (4–3 p)	Bulat Cherepovets
Dynamo Moscow (reserves)	3–0	Oka Kolomna
Saturn Ramenskoye	1–0	Torpedo Mytishchi
Dynamo-2 Moscow	w/o	Maccabi Moscow
Trestar Ostankino	0–2	Khitrye Lisy Orekhovo-Zuyevo
Iskra Smolensk	3–0	Mashinostroitel Pskov
Torgmash Lyubertsy	2–0	Interros Moskovsky
19 April 1992
Torpedo Moscow (reserves)	1–1 (a.e.t.) (1–3 p)	Turbostroitel Kaluga
Spartak Oryol	0–3	Arsenal Tula
CSKA-2 Moscow	6–1	Agtala Moscow
Titan Reutov	3–0	Avangard Kolomna
23 May 1992
Energiya Chaykovsky	w/o	Druzhba Yoshkar-Ola
Zarya Krotovka	3–2	Torpedo Arzamas
Skat-5s Yelabuga	0–1	KATs-Skif Naberezhnye Chelny
Gazovik Izhevsk	3–0	Khimik Dzerzhinsk
Torpedo Miass	4–0	MGU Saransk
Metallurg Magnitogorsk	2–0	Sodovik Sterlitamak
Azamat Cheboksary	2–0	Torpedo Pavlovo
Neftekhimik Nizhnekamsk	w/o	Zenit Chelyabinsk
Metallurg Aldan	w/o	Amur Komsomolsk-na-Amure
Metallurg Krasnoyarsk	3–0	Kuzbass Kemerovo
Agan Raduzhny	w/o	Irtysh Omsk
Chkalovets-FoKuMiS Novosibirsk	1–0	Selenga Ulan-Ude
Spartak Gorno-Altaysk	1–0	Torpedo Rubtsovsk
Zarya Leninsk-Kuznetsky	0–1	Uralets Nizhny Tagil

== Third round ==
Team 1	Score	Team 2
1 May 1992
SKA Rostov-on-Don	0–0 (a.e.t.) (6–5 p)	Khimik Belorechensk
Shakhtyor Shakhty	w/o	Arsenal Tula
Spartak Moscow (reserves)	5–2	CSKA-2 Moscow
Smena-Saturn Saint Petersburg	1–0 (a.e.t.)	Aleks Gatchina
2 May 1992
Anzhi Makhachkala	2–0	Erzu Grozny
Lokomotiv Mineralnye Vody	3–2 (a.e.t.)	Sherstyanik Nevinnomyssk
Dynamo Izobilny	1–1 (a.e.t.) (3–0 p)	Avtodor-Olaf Vladikavkaz
Volgar Astrakhan	2–0	Astrateks Astrakhan
Torpedo Armavir	0–1	Iskra Novoaleksandrovsk
Kavkazkabel Prokhladny	w/o	Uralan Elista
Start Yeysk	2–0	Niva Slavyansk-na-Kubani
Turbostroitel Kaluga	0–3	Pele Moscow
Atommash Volgodonsk	w/o	Dynamo Bryansk
Zvezda-Rus Gorodishche	2–1	Irgiz Balakovo
CSKA Moscow (reserves)	0–1	TRASKO Moscow
Baltika Kaliningrad	2–1	Galaks Saint Petersburg (Note: FC Biosvyaz-Student was changed their name to FC Galaks Saint Petersburg before the third round.)
Zvolma-Spartak Kostroma	1–0 (a.e.t.)	Volochanin Vyshny Volochyok
Vympel Rybinsk	0–1	Dynamo Moscow (reserves)
Saturn Ramenskoye	0–2	Titan Reutov
Khitrye Lisy Orekhovo-Zuyevo	2–0	Dynamo-2 Moscow
Iskra Smolensk	3–0	Torgmash Lyubertsy
13 June 1992
Energiya Chaykovsky	1–1 (a.e.t.) (5–6 p)	Zvezda Perm
Zenit Izhevsk	2–1	Zarya Krotovka
KATs-Skif Naberezhnye Chelny	3–4 (a.e.t.)	KAMAZ Naberezhnye Chelny
Gazovik Izhevsk	2–1	Rubin-TAN Kazan
Lada-Tolyatti	2–1	Torpedo Miass
Dynamo Kirov	3–2	Metallurg Magnitogorsk
Azamat Cheboksary	2–1	Lada Dimitrovgrad
Neftekhimik Nizhnekamsk	7–0	Gastello Ufa
Metallurg Aldan	w/o	Luch Vladivostok
Sakhalin Yuzhno-Sakhalinsk	1–0	SKA Khabarovsk
Amur Blagoveshchensk	4–0	Metallurg Krasnoyarsk
Agan Raduzhny	w/o	Lokomotiv Chita
Zvezda-Yunis-Sib Irkutsk	3–2	Chkalovets-FoKuMiS Novosibirsk
Metallurg Novokuznetsk	1–2	Spartak Gorno-Altaysk
Uralets Nizhny Tagil	2–0	Dynamo Barnaul

== Fourth round ==
Russian Premier League team Dynamo-Gazovik Tyumen started at this stage.

Team 1	Score	Team 2
13 June 1992
Terek Grozny	5–3	Anzhi Makhachkala
Lokomotiv Mineralnye Vody	4–2 (a.e.t.)	Asmaral Kislovodsk
Dynamo Izobilny	3–0	Spartak Nalchik
Nart Cherkessk	1–2	Volgar Astrakhan
Iskra Novoaleksandrovsk	0–1	Druzhba Maykop
Zhemchuzhina Sochi	3–0	SKA Rostov-on-Don
Kavkazkabel Prokhladny	2–0	Gekris Novorossiysk
Spartak Anapa	3–1	Start Yeysk
Pele Moscow	1–1 (a.e.t.) (3–2 p)	Energomash Belgorod
Arsenal Tula	2–1	APK Azov
Torpedo Taganrog	1–0	Atommash Volgodonsk
Torpedo Volzhsky	3–2	Zvezda-Rus Gorodishche
TRASKO Moscow	0–3	Metallurg Lipetsk
Spartak Moscow (reserves)	5–1	Sokol Saratov
Prometey-Dynamo Saint Petersburg	0–1	Smena-Saturn Saint Petersburg
Baltika Kaliningrad	2–1	Trion-Volga Tver
Tekstilshchik Ivanovo	2–1	Zvolma-Spartak Kostroma
Dynamo Moscow (reserves)	0–2	Dynamo Vologda
Titan Reutov	w/o	Svetotekhnika Saransk
Khitrye Lisy Orekhovo-Zuyevo	2–1	Torpedo Ryazan
Torpedo Vladimir	2–1	Iskra Smolensk
4 July 1992
Neftekhimik Nizhnekamsk	2–2 (a.e.t.) (7–6 p)	Azamat Cheboksary
23 July 1992
Zvezda Perm	2–2 (a.e.t.) (7–6 p)	Zenit Izhevsk
KAMAZ Naberezhnye Chelny	5–2	Gazovik Izhevsk
Lada-Tolyatti	5–1	Dynamo Kirov
Metallurg Aldan	w/o	Sakhalin Yuzhno-Sakhalinsk
Agan Raduzhny	w/o	Amur Blagoveshchensk
Spartak Gorno-Altaysk	0–0 (a.e.t.) (14–15 p)	Zvezda-Yunis-Sib Irkutsk

23 July 1992	Uralets Nizhny Tagil	2–1	Dynamo-Gazovik Tyumen	Nizhny Tagil
	Sivkov 23'; Perednya 32'		Vlasov 16'	Stadium: Uralets Stadium; Attendance: 1,000; Referee: Taras Bezubyak (Saint Petersburg)

== Fifth round ==
Russian Premier League teams Kuban Krasnodar, Zenit Saint Petersburg and Krylia Sovetov Samara started at this stage.

Team 1	Score	Team 2
23 July 1992
Lokomotiv Mineralnye Vody	2–4	Terek Grozny
Volgar Astrakhan	w/o	Dynamo Izobilny
Druzhba Maykop	1–0	Zhemchuzhina Sochi
Kavkazkabel Prokhladny	1–0	Spartak Anapa
Arsenal Tula	2–0	Pele Moscow
Metallurg Lipetsk	2–3 (a.e.t.)	Torpedo Volzhsky
Baltika Kaliningrad	0–1	Smena-Saturn Saint Petersburg
Dynamo Vologda	1–2	Tekstilshchik Ivanovo
Svetotekhnika Saransk	2–1	Khitrye Lisy Orekhovo-Zuyevo

25 July 1992	Kuban Krasnodar	2–3	Torpedo Taganrog	Krasnodar
	Kovalenko 51'; St. Lysenko 87'		Lobodenko 37', 74'; Belousov 75'	Stadium: Kuban Stadium; Attendance: 1,000; Referee: Sergei Roshchin (Kislovodsk)

25 July 1992	Zenit Saint Petersburg	3–0	Torpedo Vladimir	Saint Petersburg
	Zazulin 3', 25'; Dmitriyev 65'			Stadium: Luch Stadium; Attendance: 1,000; Referee: Sergei Khusainov (Moscow)

22 August 1992	Krylia Sovetov Samara	0–3	Spartak Moscow (reserves)	Samara
			Piatnitski 58'; Tikhonov 64'; V. Beschastnykh 84'	Stadium: Metallurg Stadium; Attendance: 3,500; Referee: Yuri Chebotaryov (Krasnodar)

Team 1	Score	Team 2
27 August 1992
KAMAZ Naberezhnye Chelny	7–1	Zvezda Perm
Neftekhimik Nizhnekamsk	3–0	Lada-Tolyatti
Metallurg Aldan	w/o	Agan Raduzhny
Zvezda-Yunis-Sib Irkutsk	0–0 (a.e.t.) (4–5 p)	Uralets Nizhny Tagil

== Round of 32 ==
All the other Russian Premier League teams started at this stage.

7 October 1992	Terek Grozny	w/o	Spartak Moscow

7 October 1992	Dynamo Stavropol	1–0 (a.e.t.)	Volgar Astrakhan	Stavropol
	Gagloyev 115'			Stadium: Dynamo Stadium; Attendance: 3,500; Referee: Yuri Savchenko (Moscow)

7 October 1992	Druzhba Maykop	0–0 (a.e.t.) (4–2 p)	Spartak Vladikavkaz	Maykop
				Stadium: Druzhba Stadium; Attendance: 6,000; Referee: Yuri Chebotaryov (Moscow
	Penalties
	B. Adzhindzhal (penalty scored); Yenik (penalty scored); Zafesov (penalty scored); Vardumyan (penalty scored)		(penalty scored) Bestayev; (penalty scored) I. A. Kachmazov; (penalty missed) Sosnitskiy; (penalty missed) Pagayev

7 October 1992	Rostselmash Rostov-on-Don	w/o	Kavkazkabel Prokhladny

7 October 1992	Arsenal Tula	0–1	Torpedo Moscow	Tula
			Ulyanov 86'	Stadium: Central Lenin Stadium; Attendance: 6,300; Referee: Sergey Lapochkin (Saint Petersburg

7 October 1992	Torpedo Taganrog	0–1	Tekstilshchik Kamyshin	Taganrog
			Sergeyev 8'	Stadium: Torpedo Stadium; Attendance: 3,000; Referee: Sergei Anokhin (Moscow)

7 October 1992	Torpedo Volzhsky	2–0	Rotor Volgograd	Volzhsky
	Petrenko 22' (pen.), 78'			Stadium: Loginov Stadium; Attendance: 3,000; Referee: Aleksandr Nefyodov (Yoshkar-Ola)

7 October 1992	Spartak Moscow (reserves)	0–1	Lokomotiv Moscow	Balashikha
			Kiselyov 12'	Stadium: Kriogenmash Stadium; Attendance: 300; Referee: Anatoli Malyarov (Moscow)

7 October 1992	Smena-Saturn Saint Petersburg	1–2	CSKA Moscow	Saint Petersburg
	Lapushkin 78' (pen.)		Grishin 29', 72'	Stadium: Smena Stadium; Attendance: 6,500; Referee: Gennadi Yarygin (Yoshkar-Ola)

7 October 1992	Tekstilshchik Ivanovo	1–2	Shinnik Yaroslavl	Ivanovo
	Tikhonov 78'		Gladyshev; Yashkin 31'	Stadium: Tekstilshchik Stadium; Attendance: 1,200; Referee: Sergei Frantsuzov (Moscow)

7 October 1992	Svetotekhnika Saransk	2–1	Asmaral Moscow	Saransk
	Korolyov 17'; Shkayev 81'		Makarov 81'	Stadium: Svetotekhnika Stadium; Attendance: 1,000; Referee: Nikolai Levnikov (Saint Petersburg)

7 October 1992	Fakel Voronezh	4–1	Zenit Saint Petersburg	Voronezh
	Pimenov 37'; Zaytsev 45'; Stepin 69'; Syomin 78'		Varfolomeyev 43'	Stadium: Tsentralnyi Profsoyuz Stadion; Attendance: 2,000; Referee: Andrei Budogosskiy (Moscow)

7 October 1992	Dynamo Moscow	3–0	KAMAZ Naberezhnye Chelny	Moscow
	Gasimov 31', 88'; Simutenkov 74'			Stadium: Dynamo Stadium; Attendance: 1,000; Referee: Aleksandr Savkin (Balashikha)

7 October 1992	Lokomotiv Nizhny Novgorod	2–0	Neftekhimik Nizhnekamsk	Nizhny Novgorod
	Gorelov 21', 28'		Kalinin (red card)	Stadium: Lokomotiv Stadium; Attendance: 3,000; Referee: Nikolai Yegorov (Lipetsk)

7 October 1992	Okean Nakhodka	1–0	Metallurg Aldan	Nakhodka
	Smirnov 30'			Stadium: Vodnik Stadium; Attendance: 4,200; Referee: Vladimir Yevtushenko (Krasnoyarsk)

7 October 1992	Uralets Nizhny Tagil	2–3 (a.e.t.)	Uralmash Yekaterinburg	Nizhny Tagil
	Bulatov 63' (pen.), 75' (pen.)		Shushlyakov 20'; Matveyev 87' (pen.); Popov 96'	Stadium: Yunost Stadium; Attendance: 3,000; Referee: Igor Siner (Omsk)

== Round of 16 ==
14 November 1992	Terek Grozny	0–1 (a.e.t.)	Dynamo Stavropol	Pyatigorsk
			Papikyan 97'	Stadium: Trud Stadium; Attendance: 1,500; Referee: Vladimir Markin (Rostov-on-Don)

14 November 1992	Tekstilshchik Kamyshin	1–3	Torpedo Moscow	Kamyshin
	Elyshev 75'		Talalayev 9'; Shustikov 41'; Tishkov 86'	Stadium: Tekstilshchik Stadium; Attendance: 5,100; Referee: Yuri Chebotaryov (Krasnodar)

14 November 1992	Lokomotiv Moscow	1–2	Torpedo Volzhsky	Moscow
	Podpaly 40' (pen.)		Petrenko 55'; Yeryomenko 75'	Stadium: LFC CSKA; Attendance: 500; Referee: Gennadi Kulichenkov (Tula)

14 November 1992	CSKA Moscow	5–1	Shinnik Yaroslavl	Moscow
	Karsakov 25'; Faizulin 37'; Grishin 41' (pen.); Kolesnikov 64'; Ivanov 66'		Gladyshev 21'	Stadium: LFC CSKA; Attendance: 2,000; Referee: Nikolai Yegorov (Lipetsk)

14 November 1992	Svetotekhnika Saransk	4–2	Fakel Voronezh	Saransk
	Rokunov 18', 25'; Korolyov 38'; Fedosov 40'		Safronov 52'; Zaytsev 75'	Stadium: Stetotekhnika Stadium; Attendance: 9,500; Referee: Sergei Frantsuzov (Moscow)

14 November 1992	Lokomotiv Nizhny Novgorod	0–1	Dynamo Moscow	Nizhny Novgorod
			Derkach 26'	Stadium: Lokomotiv Stadium; Attendance: 3,000; Referee: Taras Bezubyak (Saint Petersburg)

14 November 1992	Uralmash Yekaterinburg	8–0	Okean Nakhodka	Yekaterinburg
	Matveyev 7', 65'; Andreyev 25'; Fedotov 27'; Bluzhin 57'; Bakharev 67'; Khovanskiy 69'; Tkachenko 80'			Stadium: Central Stadium; Attendance: 8,000; Referee: Yuri Khlopotnov (Moscow)

14 November 1992	Druzhba Maykop	4–0	Rostselmash Rostov-on-Don	Maykop
	R. Ajinjal 13', 48'; Zekokh 22', 53'			Stadium: Druzhba Stadium; Attendance: 7,000; Referee: Aleksandr Kozhukhov (Moscow)

== Quarter-finals ==
19 February 1993	CSKA Moscow	3–0	Svetotekhnika Saransk	Moscow
	Karsakov 40'; Bushmanov 59'; Grishin 61' (pen.)			Stadium: LFC CSKA; Attendance: 3,000; Referee: Gennadi Kulichenkov (Tula)

16 March 1993	Dynamo Stavropol	0–3	Druzhba Maykop	Nevinnomyssk
			B. Adzhindzhal 1', 53'; Zekokh 58'	Stadium: Khimik Stadium; Attendance: 5,000; Referee: Yuri Khlopotnov (Moscow)

16 March 1993	Dynamo Moscow	3–0	Uralmash Yekaterinburg	Moscow
	Sklyarov 30'; Simutenkov 44'; Derkach 70'			Stadium: LFC CSKA; Attendance: 5,000; Referee: Nikolai Yegorov (Lipetsk)

16 March 1993	Torpedo Moscow	0–0 (a.e.t.) (8–7 p)	Torpedo Volzhsky	Moscow
				Stadium: Torpedo Stadium; Attendance: 1,200; Referee: Lom-Ali Ibragimov Grozny
	Penalties
	Afanasyev (penalty scored); Talalayev (penalty scored); Chugainov (penalty scored); Novgorodov (penalty scored); Ulyanov (penalty scored); Solovyov (penalty scored); Chumachenko (penalty scored); Aslanyan (penalty scored)		(penalty scored) Piskunov; (penalty scored) Yeryomenko; (penalty scored) Umurzakov; (penalty scored) Chupin; (penalty scored) Bolshakov; (penalty scored) Zhabko; (penalty scored) Chumachenko; (penalty missed) Ilyushin

== Semi-finals ==
27 May 1993	Torpedo Moscow	1–0	Druzhba Maykop	Moscow
	Prokopenko 21'			Stadium: Torpedo Stadium; Attendance: 2,800; Referee: Yuri Chebotaryov (Krasnodar)

27 May 1993	CSKA Moscow	1–0	Dynamo Moscow	Moscow
	Grishin 2'			Stadium: Luzhniki Stadium; Attendance: 9,500; Referee: Sergei Anokhin (Moscow)

== Final ==
13 June 1993

Torpedo Moscow	1–1 (a.e.t.)	CSKA Moscow
Savichev 7'		Faizulin 18'
Penalties
Afanasyev (penalty scored); Novgorodov (penalty scored); Pazemov (penalty scored); Arefyev (penalty scored); Ulyanov (penalty scored)	5–3	(penalty missed) Antonovich; (penalty scored) Dudnik; (penalty scored) Minko; (penalty scored) Mamchur

Torpedo Stadium, Moscow
Attendance: 20,000
Referee: Sergei Khusainov (Moscow)

FC Torpedo Moscow
PFC CSKA Moscow

FC Torpedo Moscow:
GK	(Russia) Aleksandr Podshivalov
MF	(Russia) Gennadi Filimonov
DF	(Russia) Maksim Cheltsov
DF	(Russia) Andrei Afanasyev
MF	(Russia) Dmitri Ulyanov
MF	(Russia) Sergey Shustikov (substituted off) 48'
MF	(Russia) Maksim Putilin (substituted off) 70'
MF	(Russia) Aleksei Arefyev
MF	(Russia) Nikolai Savichev (substituted off) 109'
MF	(Russia) Igor Chugainov
FW	(Russia) Dmitri Prokopenko
Substitutes:
MF	(Russia) Sergei Chumachenko (substituted on) 48'
DF	(Russia) Andrei Novgorodov (substituted on) 70'
FW	(Russia) Ivan Pazemov (substituted on) 109'
GK	(Russia) Vladimir Pchelnikov
DF	(Russia) Mikhail Solovyov
DF	(Armenia) Vartan Khachatryan
MF	(Russia) Boris Vostrosablin
Manager:
(Russia) Yury Mironov

PFC CSKA Moscow:
GK	(Russia) Yevgeni Plotnikov
DF	(Russia) Aleksei Gushchin (substituted off) 101'
DF	(Russia) Sergei Kolotovkin
MF	(Russia) Denis Mashkarin
DF	(Russia) Oleg Malyukov
DF	(Russia) Sergei Mamchur
MF	(Russia) Vasili Ivanov (substituted off) 63'
MF	(Russia) Dmitri Karsakov
MF	(Belarus) Yuri Antonovich
FW	(Russia) Oleg Sergeyev (substituted off) 83'
FW	(Russia) Ilshat Faizulin
Substitutes:
FW	(Russia) Valeri Masalitin (substituted on) 101'
DF	(Russia) Valeri Minko (substituted on) 63'
MF	(Ukraine) Yuri Dudnik (substituted on) 83'
GK	(Russia) Aleksandr Guteyev
DF	(Armenia) Yervand Krbashyan
DF	(Russia) Mikhail Kupriyanov
MF	(Russia) Vladimir Semyonov
Manager:
(Russia) Gennadi Kostylev

MATCH RULES

- 90 minutes.
- 30 minutes of extra-time if necessary.
- Penalty shootout if scores still level.
- Seven named substitutes
- Maximum of 3 substitutions.

Played in the earlier stages, but were not on the final game squad:

FC Torpedo Moscow: Mikhail Murashov (DF), Aleksey Shchigolev (DF), Gennadi Grishin (MF), Dmitri Kuznetsov (MF), Igor Aslanyan (MF), Sergey Borisov (MF), Aleksandr Sudarikov (MF), Andrei Talalayev (FW), Yuri Tishkov (FW).

PFC CSKA Moscow: Dmitri Kharine (GK), Dmitri Bystrov (DF), Sergei Fokin (DF), Yevgeni Bushmanov (MF), Aleksandr Grishin (MF), Mikhail Kolesnikov (MF), Sergei Krutov (MF), Yuri Bavykin (MF), Aleksei Poddubskiy (MF).
