= Football in Moscow =

Football is the most popular sport, both in terms of participants and spectators, in Moscow. Moscow has several of Russia's significant football clubs, and the city is home to many football clubs.

== Clubs ==
Location of Moscow football club teams. Luzhniki Stadium is also marked.

There are many successful football clubs in Moscow including FC Spartak Moscow, PFC CSKA Moscow, FC Dynamo Moscow, Lokomotiv Moscow, and Torpedo Moscow.

The table below lists all Moscow's clubs.

=== Moscow City ===
Division	Club	Founded	Status	Note
Russian Premier League	PFC CSKA Moscow	1911	Professional	
Russian Premier League	FC Spartak Moscow	1922	Professional	
Russian Premier League	FC Dynamo Moscow	1923	Professional	
Russian Premier League	FC Lokomotiv Moscow	1923	Professional	
Russian First League	FC Torpedo Moscow	1924	Professional	
Russian Premier League	FC Rodina Moscow	2016	Professional	
Russian Second League Division A	FC Dynamo-2 Moscow	1986	Professional	
Russian Second League Division A	FC Veles Moscow	2016	Professional	
Russian Second League Division A	FC Rodina-2 Moscow	2022	Professional	
Russian Second League Division B	FC Strogino Moscow	1990	Professional	
Russian Second League Division B	FC Chertanovo Moscow	1993	Professional	
Russian Second League Division B	FC Spartak-2 Moscow	2013	Professional	
Russian Second League Division B	FC Rodina-M Moscow	2022	Professional	
Russian Amateur Football League	FC Serp i Molot Moscow	1923	Amateur	
Russian Amateur Football League	FC FShM Moscow	1950	Amateur	
Russian Amateur Football League	FC Sportakademklub Moscow	1992	Amateur	
Russian Amateur Football League	FC Nika Moscow	1999	Amateur	
Russian Amateur Football League	FC Zelenograd	2002	Amateur	
Russian Amateur Football League	FC Kazanka Moscow	2008	Amateur	
Dissolved in 1923	Zamoskvoretsky Sports Club	1910	Professional	
Dissolved in 1934	FC Dukat Moscow	1924	Professional	
Dissolved in 1952	VVS Moscow	1945	Professional	
Dissolved in 1953	FC MVO Moscow	1945	Professional	
Dissolved in 1992	FC Agtala Moscow	1992	Professional	
Dissolved in 1993	FC Pele Moscow	1992	Professional	
Dissolved in 1993	FC Trestar Ostankino	1992	Professional	
Dissolved in 1998	FC Roda Moscow	1995	Professional	
Dissolved in 1998	FC MEPhI Moscow	1996	Professional	
Dissolved in 1999	FC Krasnogvardeyets Moscow	1994	Professional	
Dissolved in 2000	FC Monolit Moscow	1993	Professional	
Dissolved in 2000	FC Spartak-Chukotka Moscow	1998	Professional	
Dissolved in 2001	FC Servis-Kholod-Smena Moscow	1994	Professional	
Dissolved in 2003	FC Uralan Plus Moscow	1997	Professional	
Dissolved in 2003	FC Mostransgaz Gazoprovod	2000	Professional	
Dissolved in 2004	FC Almaz Moscow	1972	Professional	
Dissolved in 2004	FC Torpedo-ZIL Moscow	1997	Professional	
Dissolved in 2006	FC Presnya Moscow （FC Asmaral Moscow）	1978	Professional	
Dissolved in 2010	Maccabi Moscow	2003	Professional	
Dissolved in 2010	FC Moscow	2004	Professional	
Dissolved in 2011	FC Torpedo-ZIL Moscow (2003)	2003	Professional	
Dissolved in 2012	FC MVD Rossii Moscow	2007	Professional	
Dissolved in 2017	FC Solyaris Moscow	2014	Professional	
Dissolved in 2019	FC Chertanovo-2 Moscow	2018	Professional	
Dissolved in 2020	FC Ararat Moscow	2017	Professional	
Dissolved in 2022	FC Kairat Moscow	2021	Professional	
Dissolved in 2022	FC Krasava	2021	Professional	
Dissolved in 2024	FC Sakhalinets Moscow	2022	Professional	
Dissolved in 2024	FC Torpedo-2	2022	Professional	

=== Moscow Oblast ===
Division	Club	Founded	Status	Note
Russian Second League Division B	FC Znamya Truda Orekhovo-Zuyevo	1909	Professional	
Russian Second League Division B	FC Saturn Ramenskoye	1946	Professional	
Dissolved in 2025	FC Khimki	1997	Professional	

== Honours ==
- Soviet and Russian football champion (7)
  - FC Spartak Moscow (22)
  - PFC CSKA Moscow (13)
  - FC Dynamo Moscow (11)
  - FC Lokomotiv Moscow (3)
  - FC Torpedo Moscow (3)
- UEFA Cup
  - PFC CSKA Moscow (1)

== Introduction ==
Luzhniki Stadium, It was the home venue of the Russia national football team.

- Luzhniki Stadium
- Lukoil Arena
- VEB Arena
- VTB Arena
- RZD Arena
- Eduard Streltsov Stadium

== See also ==
- Football in Russia
