= Pavel Sudarikov =

Russian footballer

Personal information
- Full name: Pavel Aleksandrovich Sudarikov
- Date of birth: 24 October 1972 (age 54)
- Place of birth: Lyubertsy, Russian SFSR
- Height: 1.72 m (5 ft 7 1/2 in)
- Positions: Defender; midfielder

Youth career
- SDYuSShOR-2 Lyublinskogo RONO Moscow

Senior career*
Years	Team	Apps	(Gls)
1989–1990	FC Zvezda Moscow	27	(0)
1992	FC TRASKO Moscow	20	(0)
1993–1995	FC Kuzbass Kemerovo	34	(0)
1995	FC Lokomotiv Nizhny Novgorod	1	(0)
1996	FC Asmaral Moscow	35	(1)
1997	FC MEPhI Moscow	16	(0)
1997	FC Torpedo-ZIL Moscow	12	(1)
1998	FC Mezhdurechensk	15	(0)
1999	FC Krasnoznamensk-Selyatino Krasnoznamensk (amateur)		
2000	FC SDYuShOR Spartak-2 Moscow		
2000–2005	FC Krylia Sovetov Moscow (amateur)		
2006–2007	FC Korston Moscow		
- * Club domestic league appearances and goals

Pavel Aleksandrovich Sudarikov (Russian: Павел Александрович Судариков; born 24 October 1972) is a former Russian football player.

His older brother Aleksei Sudarikov also was a footballer.
