= Sergey Sergeyev =

Sergey Sergeyev may refer to:

- Sergey Sergeyev (footballer) (born 1965), Soviet and Russian footballer
- Sergey Sergeyev (futsal player) (born 1983), Russian futsal player
- Sergey Sergeyev (canoeist) (born 1976), Kazakhstani canoeist
- Sergei Sergeyev-Tsensky (1875–1958), Russian/Soviet writer and academician
- Sergey Sergeev (spree killer) (1964–1989), Soviet spree killer
