= Aleksei Sudarikov =

Russian footballer (born 1971)

Personal information
- Full name: Aleksei Aleksandrovich Sudarikov
- Date of birth: 1 May 1971 (age 55)
- Place of birth: Lyubertsy, Russian SFSR
- Height: 1.75 m (5 ft 9 in)
- Position: Midfielder

Youth career
- Spartak Moscow
- EShVSM Moscow

Senior career*
Years	Team	Apps	(Gls)
1989–1991	Zvezda Moscow	52	(1)
1991	Volga Tver	17	(0)
1992	Dynamo-Gazovik Tyumen	20	(0)
1993	Kaposvári Rákóczi	11	(2)
1993–1995	Lada Togliatti	20	(0)
1994	→ LG Cheetahs (loan)	3	(0)
1995	Lokomotiv Nizhny Novgorod	12	(0)
1996	Dynamo Stavropol	2	(0)
1997	Torpedo-ZIL Moscow	18	(2)
1998–1999	Fabus Bronnitsy	30	(0)
1999	Torgmash Lyubertsy	6	(0)
2000	Khimki	8	(0)
2001	Dinamo Brest	3	(0)
2002	Presnya Moscow		
2003	Krasny Oktyabr Moscow	28	(1)
2005	Orlyonok Moscow		
- * Club domestic league appearances and goals

Aleksei Aleksandrovich Sudarikov (Russian: Алексей Александрович Судариков; born 1 May 1971) is a former Russian football player.

== Club career ==
He played for many Russian clubs including FC Lada-Togliatti Togliatti and FC Seoul of the South Korean K League, then known as LG Cheetahs.

His younger brother Pavel Sudarikov also was a footballer.
