= Igor Kazmin =

Russian footballer (born 1965)

Personal information
- Full name: Igor Aleksandrovich Kazmin
- Date of birth: 8 September 1965 (age 61)
- Height: 1.80 m (5 ft 11 in)
- Position: Midfielder

Youth career
- 1982–1983: Lokomotiv Moscow

Senior career*
Years	Team	Apps	(Gls)
1983	Lokomotiv Moscow	0	(0)
1984	CSKA Moscow	0	(0)
1985	FShM Moscow	25	(3)
1986	Spartak Moscow	0	(0)
1986–1989	Krasnaya Presnya Moscow	113	(15)
1989	Dnepr Mogilev	17	(4)
1990–1994	Shinnik Yaroslavl	114	(10)
- * Club domestic league appearances and goals

Igor Aleksandrovich Kazmin (Russian: Игорь Александрович Казьмин; born 8 September 1965) is a Russian former football player.
