= Mikhail Zudenkov =

Russian footballer

Personal information
- Full name: Mikhail Viktorovich Zudenkov
- Date of birth: 13 April 1970 (age 56)
- Height: 1.76 m (5 ft 9 1/2 in)
- Positions: Forward; midfielder

Youth career
- SDYuShOR-3 Sovetskogo RONO Moscow
- SK EShVSM Moscow

Senior career*
Years	Team	Apps	(Gls)
1987–1988	SK EShVSM Moscow	11	(0)
1990–1993	FC Asmaral Moscow	62	(7)
1992–1993	→ FC Asmaral-d Moscow (loans)	2	(0)
2001	FC Torgmash Lyubertsy (amateur)		
2001	FC Nosorogi Volodarskogo		
- * Club domestic league appearances and goals

Mikhail Viktorovich Zudenkov (Russian: Михаил Викторович Зуденков; born 13 April 1970) is a former Russian football player.
