= Aleksei Belenkov =

Russian footballer

Personal information
- Full name: Aleksei Ilyich Belenkov
- Date of birth: 26 March 1957 (age 69)
- Place of birth: Balashikha, Russian SFSR
- Position: Forward

Team information
- Current team: FC Tom Tomsk (asst manager)

Senior career*
Years	Team	Apps	(Gls)
1974–1977	FC Torpedo Moscow	52	(8)
1978–1980	PFC CSKA Moscow	78	(14)
1981–1982	FC Lokomotiv Moscow	28	(1)

Managerial career
- 1992: FC Pele Moscow
- 1993: FC Torpedo-MKB Mytishchi (assistant)
- 1994–1995: FC Titan Reutov
- 1996: FC Shinnik Yaroslavl (assistant)
- 1997–1998: FC Titan Reutov
- 2000: FC Saturn-2 Ramenskoye
- 2001–2002: FC Saturn-RenTV Ramenskoye (assistant)
- 2003: FC Sokol Saratov (assistant)
- 2004: FC Khimki (assistant)
- 2004: FC Shakhter Karagandy (assistant)
- 2005–2006: FC Saturn Moscow Oblast (assistant)
- 2008: PFC CSKA Moscow (reserves assistant)
- 2009: FC Alania Vladikavkaz (assistant)
- 2010: FC Torpedo-ZIL Moscow (assistant)
- 2011: FC Ufa (assistant)
- 2012: FC Dynamo Bryansk (assistant)
- 2012–2013: FC Khimki (assistant)
- 2014–2015: FC Torpedo Moscow (assistant)
- 2016: FC Solyaris Moscow (assistant)
- 2016–: FC Tom Tomsk (assistant)
- * Club domestic league appearances and goals

Aleksei Ilyich Belenkov (Russian: Алексей Ильич Беленков; born 26 March 1957) is a Russian professional football coach and former player. He works as an assistant manager with FC Tom Tomsk.

== Honours ==
- Soviet Top League champion: 1976 (autumn).
- Soviet Top League bronze: 1977.
