= Eduard Koptily =

Russian footballer

Personal information
- Full name: Eduard Pavlovich Koptily
- Date of birth: 9 July 1969 (age 57)
- Height: 1.87 m (6 ft 1 1/2 in)
- Positions: Defender; forward; midfielder

Youth career
- SK EShVSM Moscow

Senior career*
Years	Team	Apps	(Gls)
1985–1989	SK EShVSM Moscow	91	(12)
1990–1991	FC Fakel Voronezh	42	(8)
1991–1992	FC Asmaral Moscow	27	(3)
1992	→ FC Presnya Moscow (loan)	11	(0)
1993	FC Shinnik Yaroslavl	12	(1)
1993	FC Metallurg Novotroitsk	12	(1)
1994–1995	FC Fakel Voronezh	58	(8)
1996	FC MChS-Selyatino Selyatino	32	(5)
1997	FC CSK VVS-Kristall Smolensk	10	(0)
1999–2000	FC Kolomna	26	(1)
2001–2002	FC Presnya Moscow (amateur)		
2003	SK Torpedo-ZIL Moscow		
2004	FC Boyevoye Bratstvo Pushkino		
2005	FC Troitsk-2001 Troitsk		

Managerial career
- 2006: FC Presnya Moscow (director)
- * Club domestic league appearances and goals

Eduard Pavlovich Koptily (Russian: Эдуард Павлович Коптилый; born 9 July 1969) is a former Russian football player.
