= Gennadi Syomin =

Russian footballer (1967–2021)

Personal information
- Full name: Gennadi Vladimirovich Syomin
- Date of birth: 4 December 1967
- Place of birth: Moscow, Russian SFSR, Soviet Union
- Date of death: 8 June 2021 (aged 53)
- Height: 1.79 m (5 ft 10 in)
- Position: Midfielder

Youth career
- EShVSM Moscow

Senior career*
Years	Team	Apps	(Gls)
1984	FShM Moscow	11	(2)
1985	Torpedo Moscow	0	(0)
1985–1987	SC EShVSM Moscow	53	(6)
1988–1989	Krasnaya Presnya Moscow	49	(4)
1990	Spartak Moscow	0	(0)
1991	Lokomotiv Moscow	11	(1)
1991	Shinnik Yaroslavl	6	(0)
1992	Lokomotiv Moscow	1	(0)
1992	→ Lokomotiv-d Moscow	1	(0)
1992–2000	FC Fakel Voronezh	297	(42)
2001	Uralan Elista	22	(1)
2002	Rubin Kazan	22	(4)
2003	Salyut-Energiya Belgorod	15	(3)
2004–2005	FC Dynamo Voronezh (amateur)		

Managerial career
- 2005–2007: FC Dynamo Voronezh
- 2007–2008: FC Dynamo-Voronezh-2
- 2008: FC Fakel Voronezh
- 2009: FC Dynamo Voronezh
- 2012: FC Fakelony Voronezh
- 2013–2015: FC Olimpik Novaya Usman
- * Club domestic league appearances and goals

Gennadi Vladimirovich Syomin (Russian: Геннадий Владимирович Сёмин; 4 December 1967 – 8 June 2021) was a Russian professional football coach and player.

== Club career ==
Syomin manages an amateur side FC Olimpik Novaya Usman. He made his professional debut in the Soviet Second League in 1984 for FShM Moscow. He played one game for FC Spartak Moscow in the Soviet Cup.
