= Styopin =

Styopin (masculine), Styopina (feminine) (Russian: , Стёпин, Стёпина), also when diacritics are ignored during transliteration: Stepin (masculine), Stepina (feminine), is a Russian language surname derived from the given name Styopa, a diminutive from Stepan. Notable people with the surname include:

- Aleksandr Styopin (born 1972), Russian former football player
- Anatoly Styopin (1940–2020), Soviet-Russian mathematician
- Vita Styopina (born 1976), Ukrainian high jumper

== See also ==
- Stepin (disambiguation)
