= Pryazovia (disambiguation) =

Pryazovia is the geographic area of the north coast of the Sea of Azov (Northern Pryazovia).

Pryazovia, Priazovye, etc., may also refer to:

- The whole Azov Sea littoral
- Crimean Pryazovia, the Azov Sea coast of Crimea
- SSV-201 Priazovye, Vishnya-class intelligence ship of Russian Navy
- FC Priazovye Yeysk, Russian football team from Yeysk
