= List of football clubs in Russia by competitive honours won =

This article lists Russian association football clubs whose men's sides have won competitive honours run by official governing bodies. Friendly competitions and matches organized between clubs are not included. The football associations FIFA and UEFA run international and European competitions; and Russian Football Union, and its mostly self-governing subsidiary bodies the Russian Premier League, Russian Football National League and Russian Professional Football League, run national competitions. Russian Amateur Football Leagues organise amateur competitions, but a full list of those honours is not provided in this article.

== Summary totals ==
As of 18 July 2026

Championship — Soviet Football Championship + Russian Football Championship
Cup — Soviet Cup + Russian Cup
Super Cup — Russian Super Cup + Soviet Super Cup
League Cup — USSR Federation Cup + All-Union Committee of Physical Culture and Sports Tournament + Russian Premier League Cup

UEFA Europa League (UEL)

UEFA Super Cup (USC)

CIS Cup — Commonwealth of Independent States Cup

No	Club	Domestic Titles					Worldwide Titles			Total honours
No	Club	Championship (USSR+Russia)	Cup (USSR+Russia)	Super Cup (USSR+Russia)	League Cup (USSR+Russia)	Total	UEFA Europa League	UEFA Super Cup	CIS Cup	Total honours
1	Spartak Moscow	22 (12+10)	15 (10+5)	1 (0+1)	1 (1+0)	39	-	-	6	45
2	CSKA Moscow	13 (7+6)	14 (5+9)	8 (0+8)	1 (1+0)	36	1	-	-	37
3	Zenit Saint Petersburg	12 (1+11)	6 (1+5)	11 (1+10)	1 (0+1)	30	1	1	-	32
4	Dynamo Moscow	11 (11+0)	7 (6+1)	1 (1+0)	-	19	-	-	-	19
5	Lokomotiv Moscow	3 (0+3)	11 (2+9)	3 (0+3)	-	17	-	-	1	18
6	Torpedo Moscow	3 (3+0)	7 (6+1)	-	-	10	-	-	-	10
7	FC Rubin Kazan	2 (0+2)	1 (0+1)	2 (0+2)	-	5	-	-	1	6
8—9	Krasnodar	1 (0+1)	-	-	-	1	-	-	-	1
8—9	Spartak Vladikavkaz	1 (0+1)	-	-	-	1	-	-	-	1
10—13	SKA Rostov-on-Don	-	1 (1+0)	-	-	1	-	-	-	1
10—13	Akhmat Grozny	-	1 (0+1)	-	-	1	-	-	-	1
10—13	Rostov	-	1 (0+1)	-	-	1	-	-	-	1
10—13	Tosno	-	1 (0+1)	-	-	1	-	-	-	1

=== Honours by period ===
==== Soviet period (1936 – 1992) ====
This section presents a table of clubs by honours won in the period from 1936 to 1992. The last recorded tournament is 1991–92 Soviet Cup.

No.	Club	Soviet Championship	Soviet Cup	Soviet League Cup	Soviet Super Cup	Total tournament honours	Total super cups	Total	Ref.
1	Spartak Moscow	12	10	1	0	23	0	23	
2	Dynamo Moscow	11	6	0	1	17	1	18	
3	CSKA Moscow	7	5	1	0	13	0	13	
4	Torpedo Moscow	3	6	0	0	9	0	9	
5	Zenit Saint Petersburg	1	1	0	1	2	1	3	
6	Lokomotiv Moscow	0	2	0	0	2	0	2	
7	SKA Rostov-on-Don	0	1	0	0	1	0	1	

==== Russian period (1992 – present) ====
This section presents a table of clubs by honours won in the period from 1992 to the present. The first recorded tournament is 1995 Russian Top League.

No.	Club	Russian Championship	Russian Cup	Russian Premier League Cup	Russian Super Cup	UEFA competitions	Total tournament honours	Total super cups	Total	Last won	Ref.
1	Zenit Saint Petersburg	11	5	1	10	2 (1+1)	17	10	29	2024	
2	CSKA Moscow	6	9	0	8	1 (1+0)	16	8	24	2025	
3	Spartak Moscow	10	5	0	1	0	14	1	16	2022	
4	Lokomotiv Moscow	3	9	0	3	0	12	3	15	2021	
5	FC Rubin Kazan	2	1	0	2	0	3	2	5	2012	
6—7	Spartak Vladikavkaz	1	0	0	0	0	1	0	1	1995	
6—7	Krasnodar	1	0	0	0	0	1	0	1	2025	
8—12	Torpedo Moscow	0	1	0	0	0	1	0	1	1993	
8—12	Dynamo Moscow	0	1	0	0	0	1	0	1	1995	
8—12	Akhmat Grozny	0	1	0	0	0	1	0	1	2004	
8—12	Rostov	0	1	0	0	0	1	0	1	2014	
8—12	Tosno	0	1	0	0	0	1	0	1	2018	

===== Russian national Trophies =====
Trophies in official competitions run by official Russian football governing bodies:

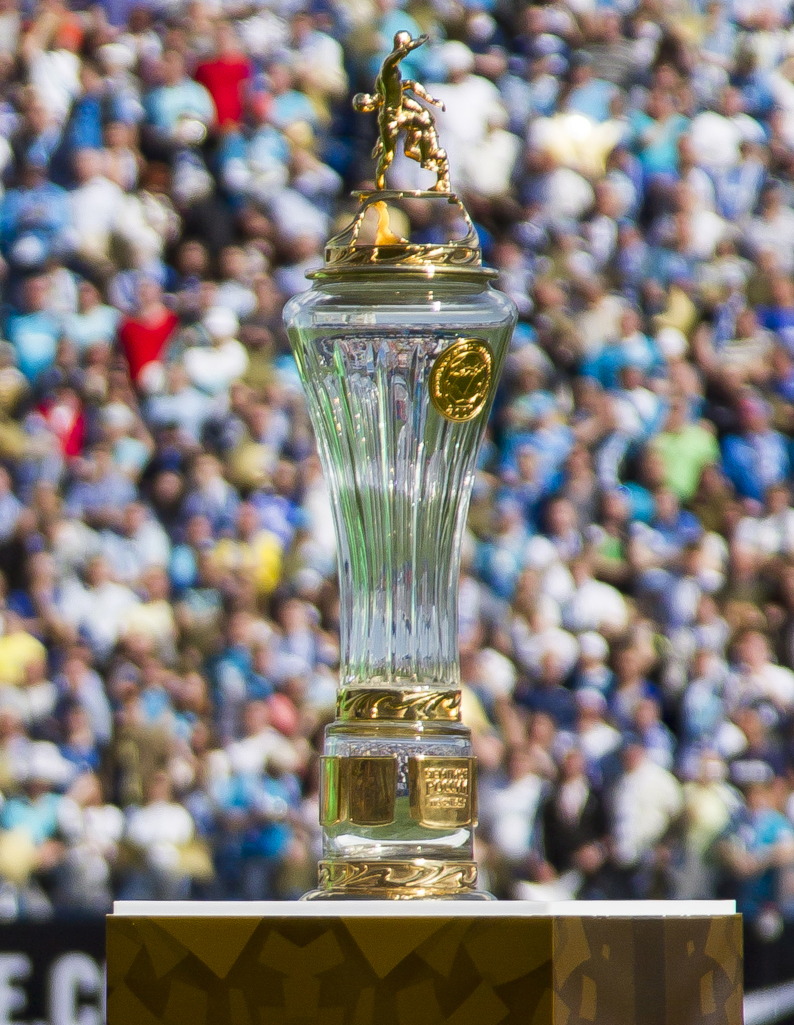
Russian Premier League Trophy

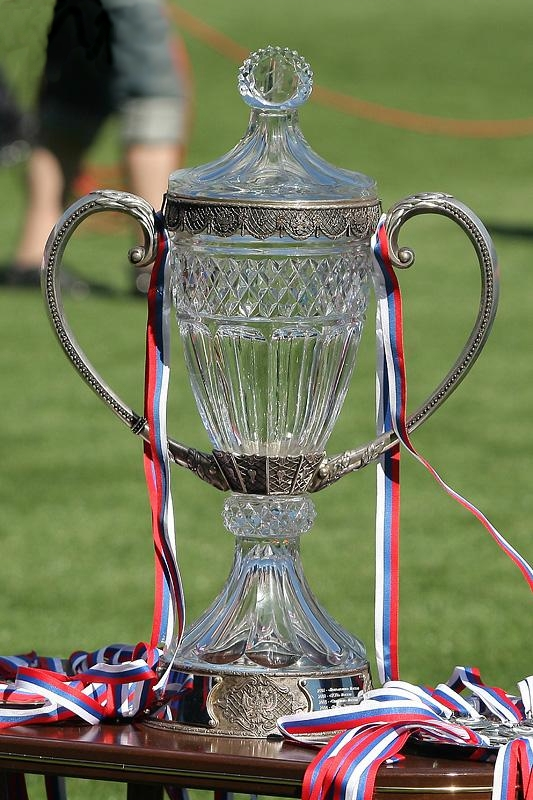
Russian Cup (2010 version)

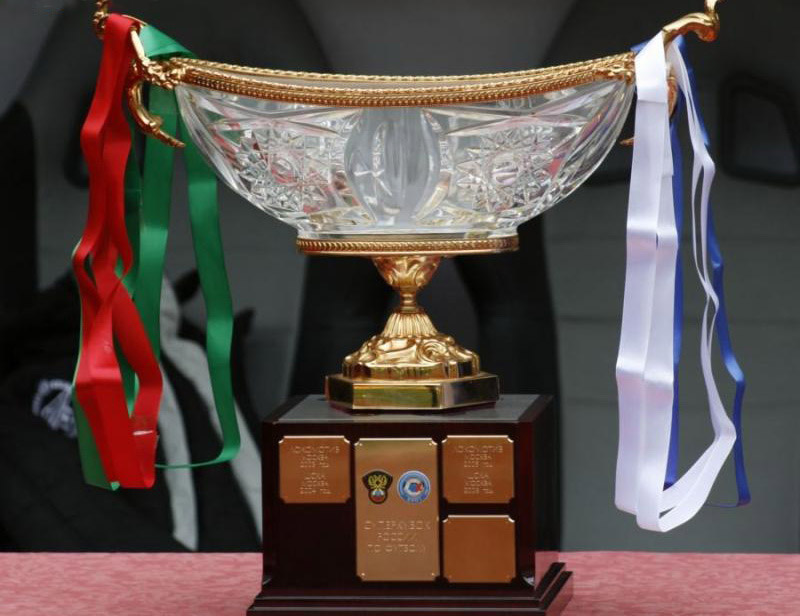
Russian Super Cup

== Trophies by year ==
This section presents Russian football clubs the winners of the tournaments for each year. If the tournament in the year was not held, the corresponding field contains "was not held". If the competition was not won by the Russian club (refers to the USSR tournaments and European cups), then the corresponding field contains dash ("—").

"*" — Champions also won the National Cup that season.

Year	Champion	Cup winner	League Cup winner	Supercup winner	UEFA Cup winner	UEFA Supercup winner	Ref.
1936 (s)	Dynamo (1)	Lokomotiv (1)	was not held	was not held	was not held	was not held	
1936 (a)	Spartak (1)	Lokomotiv (1)	was not held	was not held	was not held	was not held	
1937	Dynamo* (2)	Dynamo* (1)	was not held	was not held	was not held	was not held	
1938	Spartak* (2)	Spartak* (1)	was not held	was not held	was not held	was not held	
1939	Spartak* (3)	Spartak* (2)	was not held	was not held	was not held	was not held	
1940	Dynamo (3)	was not held	was not held	was not held	was not held	was not held	
Suspended owing to the Second World War.
1944	was not held	Zenit (1)	was not held	was not held	was not held	was not held	
1945	Dynamo (4)	CDKA (1)	was not held	was not held	was not held	was not held	
1946	CDKA (1)	Spartak (3)	was not held	was not held	was not held	was not held	
1947	CDKA (2)	Spartak (4)	was not held	was not held	was not held	was not held	
1948	CDKA* (3)	CDKA* (2)	was not held	was not held	was not held	was not held	
1949	Dynamo (5)	Torpedo (1)	was not held	was not held	was not held	was not held	
1950	CDKA (4)	Spartak (5)	was not held	was not held	was not held	was not held	
1951	CDSA* (5)	CDSA* (3)	was not held	was not held	was not held	was not held	
1952	Spartak (4)	Torpedo (2)	CDSA (1)	was not held	was not held	was not held	
1953	Spartak (5)	Dynamo (2)	was not held	was not held	was not held	was not held	
1954	Dynamo (6)	—	was not held	was not held	was not held	was not held	
1955	Dynamo (7)	CDSA (4)	was not held	was not held	was not held	was not held	
1956	Spartak (6)	was not held	was not held	was not held	was not held	was not held	
1957	Dynamo (8)	Lokomotiv (2)	was not held	was not held	was not held	was not held	
1958	Spartak* (7)	Spartak* (6)	was not held	was not held	was not held	was not held	
1959	Dynamo (9)	Torpedo* (3)	was not held	was not held	was not held	was not held	
1960	Torpedo* (1)	Torpedo* (3)	was not held	was not held	was not held	was not held	
1961	—	—	was not held	was not held	was not held	was not held	
1962	Spartak (8)	—	was not held	was not held	was not held	was not held	
1963	Dynamo (10)	Spartak (7)	was not held	was not held	was not held	was not held	
1964	—	—	was not held	was not held	was not held	was not held	
1965	Torpedo (2)	Spartak (8)	was not held	was not held	was not held	was not held	
1966	—	—	was not held	was not held	was not held	was not held	
1967	—	Dynamo (3)	was not held	was not held	was not held	was not held	
1968	—	Torpedo (4)	was not held	was not held	was not held	was not held	
1969	Spartak (9)	—	was not held	was not held	was not held	was not held	
1970	CSKA (6)	Dynamo (4)	was not held	was not held	was not held	was not held	
1971	—	Spartak (9)	was not held	was not held	was not held	was not held	
1972	—	Torpedo (5)	was not held	was not held	—	—	
1973	—	—	was not held	was not held	—	—	
1974	—	—	was not held	was not held	—	was not held	
1975	—	—	was not held	was not held	—	—	
1976 (s)	Dynamo (11)	—	was not held	was not held	—	—	
1976 (a)	Torpedo (3)	—	was not held	was not held	—	—	
1977	—	Dynamo (5)	was not held	Dynamo (1)	—	—	
1978	—	—	was not held	was not held	—	—	
1979	Spartak (10)	—	was not held	was not held	—	—	
1980	—	—	was not held	was not held	—	—	
1981	—	SKA (1)	was not held	—	—	was not held	
1982	—	—	was not held	was not held	—	—	
1983	—	—	was not held	was not held	—	—	
1984	Zenit (1)	Dynamo (6)	was not held	—	—	—	
1985	—	—	was not held	Zenit (1)	—	was not held	
1986	—	Torpedo (6)	—	—	—	—	
1987	Spartak (11)	—	Spartak (1)	—	—	—	
1988	—	—	—	was not held	—	—	
1989	Spartak (12)	—	—	—	—	—	
1990	—	—	—	was not held	—	—	
1991	CSKA* (7)	CSKA* (5)	was not held	was not held	—	—	
1992	Spartak* (13)	Spartak* (10)	was not held	was not held	—	—	
1993	Spartak (14)	Torpedo (7)	was not held	was not held	—	—	
1994	Spartak* (15)	Spartak* (11)	was not held	was not held	—	—	
1995	Alania (1)	Dynamo (7)	was not held	was not held	—	—	
1996	Spartak (16)	Lokomotiv (3)	was not held	was not held	—	—	
1997	Spartak (17)	Lokomotiv (4)	was not held	was not held	—	—	
1998	Spartak* (18)	Spartak* (12)	was not held	was not held	—	—	
1999	Spartak (19)	Zenit (2)	was not held	was not held	—	—	
2000	Spartak (20)	Lokomotiv (5)	was not held	was not held	—	—	
2001	Spartak (21)	Lokomotiv (6)	was not held	was not held	—	—	
2002	Lokomotiv (1)	CSKA (6)	was not held	was not held	—	—	
2003	CSKA (8)	Spartak (13)	Zenit (1)	Lokomotiv (1)	—	—	
2004	Lokomotiv (2)	Terek (1)	was not held	CSKA (1)	—	—	
2005	CSKA* (9)	CSKA* (7)	was not held	Lokomotiv (2)	CSKA (1)	—	
2006	CSKA* (10)	CSKA* (8)	was not held	CSKA (2)	—	—	
2007	Zenit (2)	Lokomotiv (7)	was not held	CSKA (3)	—	—	
2008	Rubin (1)	CSKA (9)	was not held	Zenit (2)	Zenit (1)	Zenit (1)	
2009	Rubin (2)	CSKA (10)	was not held	CSKA (4)	—	—	
2010	Zenit* (3)	Zenit* (3)	was not held	Rubin (1)	—	—	
2011	Zenit (4)	CSKA (11)	was not held	Zenit (3)	—	—	
2012	Zenit (4)	Rubin (1)	was not held	Rubin (2)	—	—	
2013	CSKA* (11)	CSKA* (12)	was not held	CSKA (5)	—	—	
2014	CSKA (12)	Rostov (1)	was not held	CSKA (6)	—	—	
2015	Zenit (5)	Lokomotiv (8)	was not held	Zenit (4)	—	—	
2016	CSKA (13)	Zenit (4)	was not held	Zenit (5)	—	—	
2017	Spartak (22)	Lokomotiv (9)	was not held	Spartak (1)	—	—	
2018	Lokomotiv (3)	Tosno (1)	was not held	CSKA (7)	—	—	
2019	Zenit (6)	Lokomotiv (10)	was not held	Lokomotiv (3)	—	—	
2020	Zenit* (7)	Zenit* (5)	was not held	Zenit (6)	—	—	
2021	Zenit* (8)	Lokomotiv (11)	was not held		—	—	

== See also ==
- List of football clubs by competitive honours won
