= Dmitri Pylikhin =

Russian association football player

Personal information
- Full name: Dmitri Gennadyevich Pylikhin
- Date of birth: 18 February 1971 (age 55)
- Height: 1.82 m (5 ft 11 1/2 in)
- Position: Midfielder

Senior career*
| Years | Team | Apps | (Gls) |
| 1991 | FC Presnya Moscow | 38 | (0) |
| 1992 | FC Dynamo-Gazovik Tyumen | 1 | (0) |
- * Club domestic league appearances and goals

Dmitri Gennadyevich Pylikhin (Russian: Дмитрий Геннадьевич Пылихин; born 18 February 1971) is a former Russian football player.
