= Sushkov =

Sushkov (Russian: Сушков) is a Russian masculine surname, its feminine counterpart is Sushkova. It may refer to

- Mikhail Sushkov (1775–1792), Russian nobleman and writer
- Mikhail Sushkov (footballer) (1899–1983), Russian football player
- Oleg Sushkov, Russian physicist
