= Umurzakov =

Umurzakov is a surname. Notable people with the surname include:

- Oleg Umurzakov (born 1967), Russian professional footballer
- Pavel Umurzakov (born 1976), Uzbekistan bodybuilder
