= Dmitri Kuznetsov =

Dmitri Kuznetsov may refer to:

- Dmitri Kuznetsov (footballer, born 1965), Russian football manager and former midfielder/defender
- Dmitri Kuznetsov (footballer, born 1972), Russian football midfielder
- Dmitry Kuznetsov (politician) (born 1975), Russian politician
- Husky (rapper) (born 1993), stage name of Russian rapper Dmitry Nikolayevich Kuznetsov
