= Aleksandr Chernikov =

Aleksandr Chernikov may refer to:

- Aleksandr Chernikov (footballer, born 1970), Russian football player
- Aleksandr Chernikov (footballer, born 2000), Russian football player
