= Stepin =

Stepin may refer to:

== People ==
- Aleksandr Stepin (born 1972), Russian footballer
- Stepin Fetchit (1902–1985), American vaudevillian, comedian, and film actor
- Vyacheslav Stepin (1934–2018), Russian philosopher

== Places ==
- An alternative transliteration of the Russian surname Styopin
- Stepin Lug, a suburb of Belgrade
- Stępin, a Polish village
