= Priazovye (disambiguation) =

Priazovye is the Azov Sea littoral, or a more narrow sense, its northern part, within Ukraine.

Priazovye may also refer to:

- FC Priazovye Yeysk, a football (soccer) club in Yeysk, Russia
- SSV-201 Priazovye, a Vishnya-class intelligence ship, Russia
