= Igor Kachmazov =

Igor Kachmazov may refer to:

- Igor Kachmazov (footballer, born 1962), Soviet and Russian footballer
- Igor Kachmazov (footballer, born 1968) (1968-2019), Soviet and Russian footballer
