= Alexei Bolshakov =

Alexei Bolshakov may refer to:

- Aleksei Bolshakov (born 1966), Russian footballer
- Alexei Bolshakov (politician) (1939–2017), Russian politician
