= FC Iskra =

FC Iskra ("FC Spark") may refer to:

- FK Iskra Borčice, Slovak football club
- FK Iskra Danilovgrad, Montenegrin football club
- FC Iskra Engels, Russian football club
- FC Iskra Kazan, name of FC Rubin Kazan from 1958 to 1964
- FC Iskra Novoaleksandrovsk, Russian football club
- FC Iskra Rîbnița, Moldovan football club
- FC Iskra Smolensk, Russian football club
- FC Iskra-Stal, Moldovan football club
