= Aleksandr Chernikov (footballer, born 1970) =

Russian footballer

Personal information
- Full name: Aleksandr Aleksandrovich Chernikov
- Date of birth: 13 December 1970 (age 55)
- Height: 1.75 m (5 ft 9 in)
- Position: Forward

Senior career*
Years	Team	Apps	(Gls)
1987	SK EShVSM Moscow	2	(1)
1988	FC Lokomotiv Moscow	0	(0)
1989	FC Spartak Moscow	0	(0)
1990–1992	FC Asmaral Moscow	21	(1)
1991–1992	→ FC Presnya Moscow (loan)	59	(17)
1992	FC Karelia Petrozavodsk	10	(2)
1993	FC Asmaral Kislovodsk	4	(0)
1993	FC Torpedo Miass	16	(0)
1996	FC Neftekhimik Nizhnekamsk	2	(0)
- * Club domestic league appearances and goals

Aleksandr Aleksandrovich Chernikov (Russian: Александр Александрович Черников; born 13 December 1970) is a former Russian football player.

== Club career ==
He played for the main squads of FC Lokomotiv Moscow and FC Spartak Moscow in the USSR Federation Cup.
