= Igor Makarov =

Igor Makarov may refer to:

- Igor Makarov (footballer, born 1961), Russian footballer
- Igor Makarov (businessman) (born 1962), Turkmeni-born Cypriot entrepreneur, philanthropist and former cyclist
- Igor Makarov (footballer, born 1970), Russian footballer
- Igor Makarov (ice hockey) (born 1987), Russian professional ice hockey player
- Igor Makarov, Russian name of Ihar Makarau (born 1979), Belarusian judoka
- Igor Makarov, Russian name of Ihar Makaraw (born 1985), Belarusian footballer
