= Mikhail Sushkov (footballer) =

Russian footballer

Michail Sushkov
Personal information
- Full name: Michail Pavlovich Sushkov
- Date of birth: 19 January 1899
- Place of birth: Moscow, Russian Empire
- Date of death: 6 December 1983 (aged 84)
- Place of death: Moscow, Soviet Union
- Height: 1.72 m (5 ft 8 in)
- Positions: Forward; midfielder

Youth career
- 1915: Mamontovka Moscow guberny

Senior career*
Years	Team	Apps	(Gls)
1916–1918	SKZ Moscow		
1922	SKZ Moscow		
1923–1924	Yacht-Club Raykomvoda Moscow		
1924	MSFC Moscow		
1925–1930	Tryokhgorka Moscow		
1931–1932	AMO Moscow		
19313	Dukat Moscow		
1934	Rabis Moscow		
1935–1936	Dinamo Sverdlovsk		

Managerial career
- 1935–1937: Dynamo Sverdlovsk (played trainer)
- 1938–1940: Lokomotiv Moscow
- 1941: Profsoyusy-1 Moscow
- 1945: Lokomotiv Moscow
- 1946: Dynamo Yerevan
- 1948: Dynamo Kyiv
- 1960–1962: Tekstilshchik Ivanovo
- * Club domestic league appearances and goals as of 12 May 2012

Mikhail Pavlovich Sushkov (Russian: Михаил Павлович Сушков, 7 January 1899 – 6 December 1983) was a Russian footballer, playing as a striker or midfielder, and soccer coach.

In 1915 he began his playing career at the Moscow team Mamontovka, where the next year he went to SKZ Moscow. He participated in the Russian Civil War. In 1923, he joined Yacht-Club Raykomvoda Moscow. Then he played for the clubs MSFC Moscow, Tryokhgorka Moscow, AMO Moscow, Rabis Moscow and Dukat Moscow. In 1935 he moved to Dinamo Sverdlovsk, where he made his debut in 1937 in the Class D championship of the USSR. After the season, he ended his playing career in 1937.

He defended the team colors of Moscow (1922–1924, 1927–1928), the representation of Trade Unions in Moscow and the Russian SFSR and the representation of Sverdlovsk (1935, captain). He was a participant of the Russian SFSR championship in 1935. He appeared in the match against Turkey.

While still a player in the years 1935-1937 he also began coaching at Dinamo Sverdlovsk. In the years 1938-1940 and in 1945 he coached the club Lokomotiv Moscow. In 1941, led the newly established club Profsoyuzy-1 Moscow, and in 1946 Dinamo Yerevan. In August 1948 he was appointed head coach of Dynamo Kiev, with whom he worked until the end of the year. From 1960 to 1962 he trained with Tekstilshchik Ivanovo. From 1947 to 1953 he worked intermittently as a head coach of the Faculty of Sport Football Committee of the USSR, in the years 1954 to 1955 lecturer at the Institute of Physical Culture in Beijing, the national coach 1956-1957 of the Faculty of Sport Football Committee Russian SFSR in 1956-1957 Director of Football and Hockey Central Council of Sport Society "Trud", in the years 1964-1983 the chairman and president of a national junior Dziecinno-Club and from 1968 to 1973, chairman of the Football Federation of USSR. He was also author of many scientific and methodological manuals for football and the book "Football theater" (Moscow, 1981). He died on 6 December 1983 in Moscow at the age of 84.

He was awarded the title Honoured Master of Sports of the USSR in 1948 and awarded the Order of Friendship of Peoples in 1979.
