= Sergei Zorya =

Russian footballer

Personal information
- Full name: Sergei Anatolyevich Zorya
- Date of birth: 6 September 1972 (age 54)
- Place of birth: Dimitrovgrad, Russian SFSR
- Height: 1.82 m (5 ft 11 1/2 in)
- Position: Midfielder

Youth career
- FC Torpedo Moscow

Senior career*
Years	Team	Apps	(Gls)
1989–1991	FC Torpedo Moscow	0	(0)
1992	FC Zenit Saint Petersburg	2	(0)
1992–1993	FC Torpedo Moscow	2	(0)
1992	→ FC Torpedo-d Moscow (loan)	17	(5)
1993	FC Asmaral Moscow	10	(0)
1993–1994	FC Asmaral-d Moscow	17	(1)
- * Club domestic league appearances and goals

Sergei Anatolyevich Zorya (Russian: Сергей Анатольевич Зоря; born 6 September 1972) is a former Russian football player.
