= Yevgeni Zaytsev =

Yevgeni Zaytsev may refer to:

- Yevgeny Zaytsev (boxer) (born 1965), Soviet boxer
- Yevgeni Zaytsev (footballer, born 1968), Russian football forward/midfielder
- Yevgeni Zaytsev (footballer, born 1971), Russian football defender
