= Sergei Khusainov =

Soviet association football player and referee

Sergei Grigorievich Khusainov (Russian: Серге́й Григо́рьевич Хусаи́нов, birth Rashid Rahmatullovich Khusainov (Russian: Раши́д Рахмату́ллович Хусаи́нов; born July 18, 1954, Moscow) is a Russian football referee and a former football player. He works in the international category.

== Career ==
After a dispute with a match referee, Khusainov decided to become a judge. In the top league of the USSR championship he refereed 74 matches. In the championship of Russia, he judged some 183 matches. He was Chief Justice of the Russian Cup final 1993. He was voted best referee in 1987, 1988, 1991–1994 and 1996–1998. In 1999, he retired.

In 1994, he coached the youth team of Russia.
