= Andrei Afanasyev =

Russian footballer (born 1964)

Personal information
- Full name: Andrei Igorevich Afanasyev
- Date of birth: 15 May 1964 (age 62)
- Place of birth: Moscow, Russian SFSR
- Height: 1.87 m (6 ft 2 in)
- Positions: Defender; midfielder

Team information
- Current team: FC Torpedo Moscow (U-21 assistant)

Youth career
- 1982–1983: CSKA Moscow

Senior career*
Years	Team	Apps	(Gls)
1984–1988	CSKA Moscow	91	(3)
1989–1994	FC Torpedo Moscow	131	(12)
1993	→ FC Torpedo-2	1	(0)
1995	FC Spartak Moscow	19	(1)
1996–1997	FC Lokomotiv Nizhny Novgorod	46	(3)
1997	Navbahor Namangan	11	(1)
1998–2001	FC Saturn Ramenskoye	98	(2)
Total		396	(22)

International career
1993–1995	Russia	4	(0)

Managerial career
- 2001–2002: FC Saturn Ramenskoye (assistant)
- 2003–2004: SC Torpedo Moscow
- 2004: FC Khimki (assistant)
- 2005: FC Titan Moscow
- 2005–2006: FC Saturn Ramenskoye (assistant)
- 2006: FC Dana Moscow
- 2008: FC Dmitrov
- 2009: FC Zelenograd
- 2010–2012: FC Alania Vladikavkaz (assistant)
- 2014: FC Sakhalin Yuzhno-Sakhalinsk
- 2014: FC Sakhalin Yuzhno-Sakhalinsk (youth development)
- 2020–2021: FC Saturn Ramenskoye (assistant)
- 2021–2022: FC Tom Tomsk (assistant)
- 2022–2023: FC Volga Ulyanovsk (assistant)
- 2024: Academy FC Torpedo Moscow
- 2025–: FC Torpedo Moscow (U-21 assistant)
- * Club domestic league appearances and goals

Andrey Igorevich Afanasyev (Russian: Андрей Игоревич Афанасьев; born 15 May 1964) is a Russian association football coach and a former player.

== Honours degree ==
- Russian Premier League bronze: 1995.
- Russian Cup winner: 1993.
- Soviet Cup runner-up: 1991.

== International career ==
Born in Moscow, Afanasyev made his debut for Russia on 13 February 1993 in a friendly against the United States.
