= Igor Aslanyan =

Russian footballer

Personal information
- Full name: Igor Borisovich Aslanyan
- Date of birth: March 21, 1967 (age 59)
- Height: 1.72 m (5 ft 7 1/2 in)
- Positions: Midfielder; forward

Senior career*
Years	Team	Apps	(Gls)
1988–1991	FC Torpedo Vladimir	147	(19)
1992	FC Asmaral Moscow	25	(3)
1993	FC Torpedo Moscow	6	(0)
1993	FC Torpedo-d	4	(0)
1994	FC Lokomotiv Nizhny Novgorod	5	(0)
1994–1995	FC Torpedo Vladimir	56	(4)
1996	FC Saturn Ramenskoye	35	(1)
1998–1999	FC Spartak-Telekom Shuya	62	(2)
2000–2001	FC Torpedo Vladimir	17	(2)
2001–2002	FC Spartak-Telekom Shuya	38	(0)
- * Club domestic league appearances and goals

Igor Borisovich Aslanyan (Russian: Игорь Борисович Асланян; born March 21, 1967) is an [Armenian] Russian retired professional footballer. He made his professional debut in the Soviet Second League in 1988 for FC Torpedo Vladimir.

== Honours ==
- Russian Cup winner: 1993.
