= Aleksey Shchigolev =

Russian footballer (born 1972)

Aleksey Schigolev Алексей Щиголев
Personal information
- Full name: Aleksey Nikolaevich Schigolev
- Date of birth: 18 September 1972 (age 54)
- Place of birth: Moscow, Soviet Union
- Height: 1.91 m (6 ft 3 in)
- Position: Defender

Youth career
- 1989–1991: Torpedo Moscow

Senior career*
| Years | Team | Apps | (Gls) |
| 1991 | Zvezda Moscow | 1 | (0) |
| 1991–1992 | Torpedo Moscow | 1 | (0) |
| 1993–1994 | Shinnik Yaroslavl | 51 | (0) |
| 1994 | LG Cheetahs | 3 | (0) |
| 1994–1995 | Beitar Tel Aviv | 28 | (0) |
| 1996 | Bucheon Yukong | 22 | (0) |
| 1997 | Shinnik Yaroslavl | 21 | (0) |
| 1998 | Uralan Elista | 4 | (0) |
| 1999 | Tom Tomsk | 15 | (0) |
| 1999–2000 | Maccabi Herzliya | 6 | (0) |
| 2000–2002 | Tom Tomsk | 70 | (0) |
| 2003–2005 | Metallurg-Kuzbass Novokuznetsk | 114 | (2) |
| 2006 | Ryazan-Agrokomplekt | 32 | (0) |
| 2007–2009 | Dinamo Brest | 53 | (0) |
- * Club domestic league appearances and goals

Aleksey Shchigolev (Russian: Алексей Щиголев; born 18 September 1972) is a retired Russian footballer who played as defender.

== Career ==
Shchigolev played for FC Tom Tomsk in the Russian First Division during the 2001 season, and Metallurg-Kuzbass in the Russian First Division during the 2003 season.

He also joined many foreign clubs in various countries. He played for Jeju United of the South Korean K-League, then known as Bucheon Yukong. He also played Beitar Tel Aviv and Maccabi Herzliya in the Israeli Premier League. He finished his career last season with FC Dinamo Brest in Belarus.
