= Football in Russia =

Football in post Soviet Russia
- Country: Russia
- Governing body: RFS
- National team: Russia
- Clubs: List of football clubs in Russia

National competitions
- FIFA World Cup (suspended); UEFA European Championship (suspended); UEFA Nations League (suspended)

Club competitions
- League: Russian Premier League; Russian Football National League; Russian Professional Football League; Russian Amateur Football League; Cups: Russian Cup; Russian Super Cup

International competitions
- FIFA Club World Cup (suspended); UEFA Champions League (suspended); UEFA Europa League (suspended); UEFA Conference League (suspended); UEFA Super Cup (suspended)

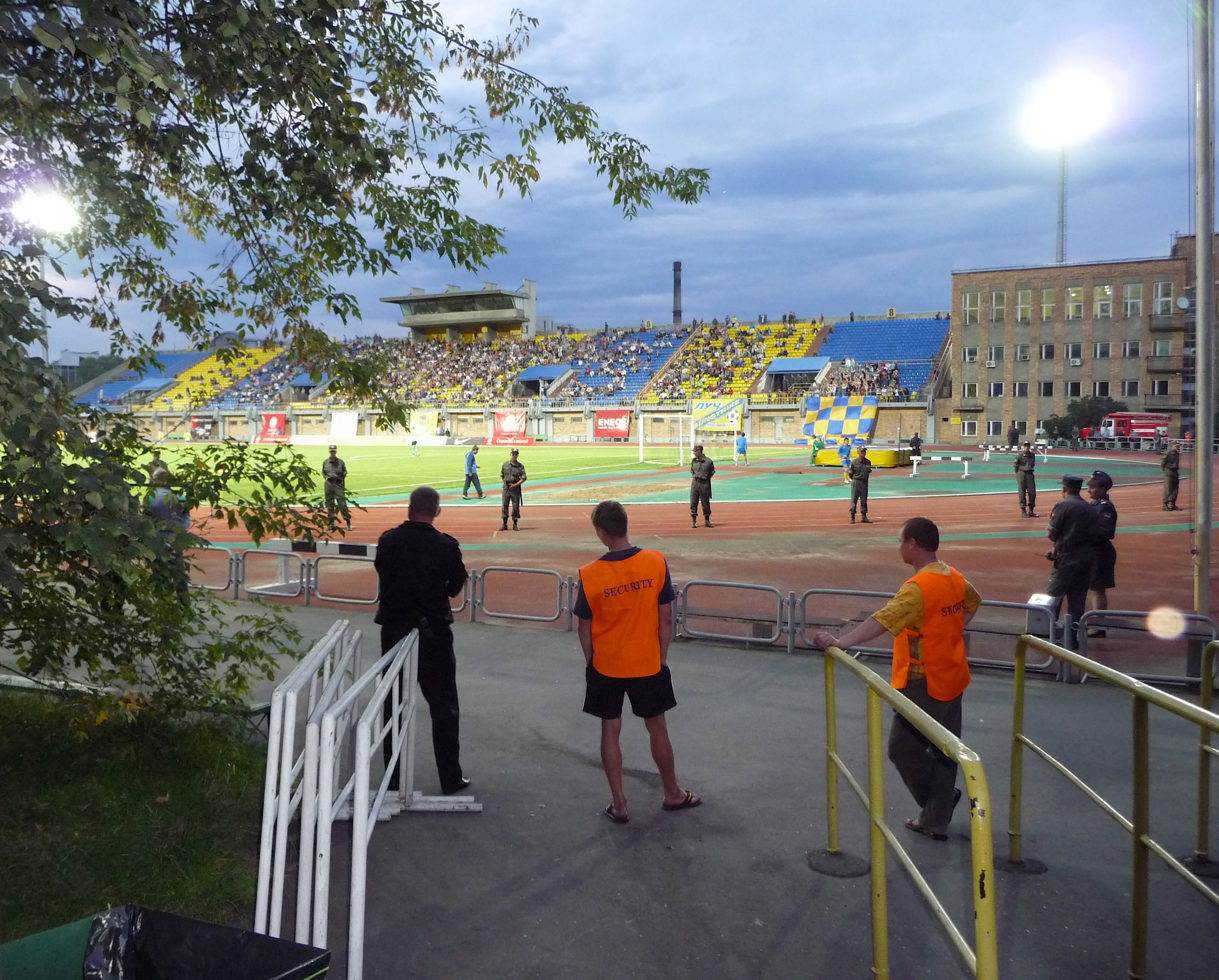
A typical Soviet stadium in Vladivostok.

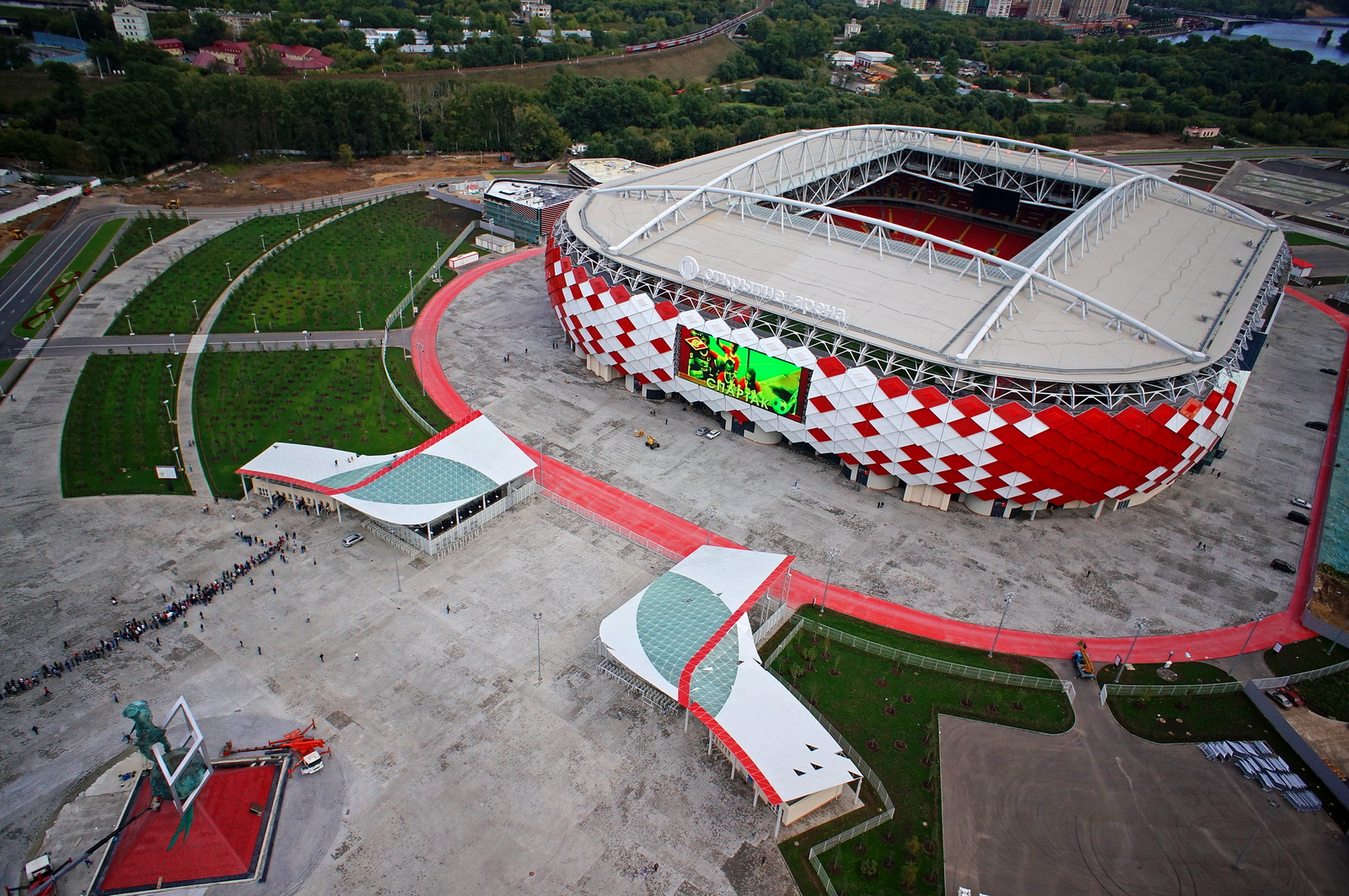
Otkrytiye Arena is Spartak Moscow's home ground, opened in 2014.

Association football is the most popular sport in Russia, closely contesting ice hockey. Approximately 52% of Russians are interested in football.

Men's football is overseen by the Russian Football Union, having the Russian Premier League as the first tier of the Russian football league system, with the Russian Football National League being the second tier.

On 28 February 2022, due to the 2022 Russian invasion of Ukraine and in accordance with a recommendation by the International Olympic Committee (IOC), FIFA and UEFA suspended the participation of Russia, including in the Qatar 2022 World Cup. The Russian Football Union unsuccessfully appealed the FIFA and UEFA bans to the Court of Arbitration for Sport, which upheld the bans.

== Following the break up of the USSR ==
With the USSR collapsing in 1991, Russia emerged as its successor state, with the Soviet football federation being transformed in the Russian football federation. While the national teams and the clubs used to be linked to state institutions or mass organizations, in 1991 some of them became private enterprises. Just like in many other spheres of business, corrupt and sometimes bloody division of power began. Furthermore, many teams of the erstwhile Soviet Top League, were now divided between the national football associations of the newly independent republics. Many of the top brand names lost their financing from the government and were left to rot, waiting for some forms of sponsorship. Citizens of Russia are interested mostly in the national team that gets to compete in the World Cup and the European Championship, and in the Premier league, where clubs from different cities look to become champions of Russia. There are also competitions considered less important, such as the Russian Cup. Some of the most successful clubs include Spartak Moscow, Lokomotiv Moscow, CSKA Moscow, Zenit St. Petersburg, Dynamo Moscow and FC Torpedo Moscow.

Today, football is the most popular in Russia, beating hockey. A very high proportion of men are interested in it to a certain extent (and many children play it regularly) and women also join men when it comes to the national team. The Russian league is rapidly regaining its former strength because of huge sponsorship deals, an influx of finances and a fairly high degree of competitiveness with roughly 5 teams capable of winning the title. Russian top teams are usually sponsored by state-controlled companies. For example, Gazprom sponsors Zenit Saint Petersburg, Lukoil sponsors FC Spartak Moscow, Russian Railways sponsors FC Lokomotiv Moscow etc. Many notable talented foreign players have been and are playing in the Russian league as well as local talented players worthy of a spot in the starting eleven of the best clubs. Foreign players sometimes face a very hostile environment. A problem of racism in Russian football is particularly important.

The Russian national team gained attention when they defeated traditional European powerhouse Netherlands 3–1 in the Euro 2008 quarterfinals before losing to eventual champions Spain. Nevertheless, four players made the Team of the Tournament. Some players such as Andrei Arshavin and Roman Pavlyuchenko earned big-money moves to the English Premier League after impressing at the tournament. Currently, the majority of Russian footballers play in a home league mainly due to the foreign players limits. This causes a significant disbalance in players' salaries with Russian footballers getting more than their foreign counterparts only because of their nationality.

Thus as of 2010 the Russian Premier League was among the best in Eastern Europe, as evidenced by recent victories in the UEFA Cup (CSKA Moscow defeated Sporting CP in the 2005 final and Zenit St. Petersburg earned a victory over Rangers F.C. in the 2008 UEFA Cup in Manchester and also claimed the UEFA Super Cup in a 2–1 win over Manchester United.)

On 28 February 2022, due to the 2022 Russian invasion of Ukraine and in accordance with a recommendation by the International Olympic Committee (IOC), FIFA and UEFA suspended the participation of Russia, including in the Qatar 2022 World Cup. The Russian Football Union unsuccessfully appealed the FIFA and UEFA bans to the Court of Arbitration for Sport, which upheld the bans.

== League system ==
The first level of the Russian league system is the 16-club Premier League. Below are two other professional levels, namely First League and Second League, both managed by the National Football League. The First League consists of 18 clubs, and the Second League has 72 clubs split geographically into Groups 1 to 4 (representing Southern, Western, Central and Eastern parts of Russia) with varying numbers of clubs. Four clubs from the Far East are allocated to Groups 2 to 4. After each season, the top two clubs of the First League replace the bottom two clubs of the Premier League, and champions of each Second League group replace the four bottom clubs of the First League.

The Second League Division B is the lowest level of professional football in Russia. The next level of football is the Amateur Football League (aka Third Division), which is split into ten zones: North-West (Severo-Zapad), Golden Ring (Zolotoe Koltso), Moscow City (Gorod Moskva), Moscow Region (Podmoskovye), Center, South (Yug), Volga Region (Privolzhye), Ural and West Siberia (Ural i Zapadnaya Sibir), Siberia (Sibir), and Far East (Dalniy Vostok). Also there is a Cup competition in each zone. At the end of the season, the zonal champions and cup winners participate in the AFL Finals to determine the AFL Champions and Cup Winners. There is no automatical promotion/relegation between Second League and AFL, though the winners of each Amateur Football League zone are eligible for promotion to the Second League Division B, provided that they have taken part in the AFL Finals. The actual promotion and relegation is subject to meeting Professional Football League requirements.

There is no promotion/relegation between the AFL and lower level either, and the composition of AFL zones can change a lot from season to season, as the AFL is basically open to new clubs. At the lower level, there are championships of federal subjects. They are often called the Fourth Division, though these competitions are formally not part of the league system. Nevertheless, some AFL zonal football unions organize tournaments (like Champions League) for the champions of federal subjects which are the members of the respective union. Many federal subject leagues provide a much stronger competition, so clubs often prefer to stay at the 5th level rather than enter the AFL. The competitions at the 4th and 5th level have a spring-autumn format, unlike the autumn-spring professional league format.

Level	League/Division(s)										
1	Russian Premier League; 16 clubs										
2	Russian First League; 18 clubs										
3	Russian Second League Division A										
3	Gold Group; 10 clubs						Silver Group; 10 clubs				
4	Russian Second League Division B										
4	Group 1.1; 7 clubs		Group 1.2; 7 clubs		Group 2; 18 clubs			Group 3; 18 clubs		Group 4; 9 clubs	
5	Russian Amateur Football League										
5	North West; 8 clubs	Saint Petersburg; 10 clubs	Golden Ring; 10 clubs	Moscow City; 10 clubs	Moscow Region; 12 clubs	Center; 11 clubs	South; 9 clubs	Volga Region; 8 clubs	Ural and West Siberia; 13 clubs	Siberia; 15 clubs	Far East no championship
6	Championships of Federal Subjects										
6	Kaliningrad Region: Supreme Division (12 clubs); First Division (12 clubs); Second Division (7 clubs) Karelia Republic: 20+ clubs Komi Republic: 12 clubs Murmansk Region: 9 clubs Pskov Region: 17 clubs Leningrad Region: 10 clubs Arkhangelsk Region, Novgorod Region: no league	St.Petersburg: First League (15 clubs)	Ivanovo Region: Supreme League (10 clubs); First League (11 clubs); Second League (11 clubs) Kirov Region: 10 clubs Kostroma Region: 8 clubs Tver Region: Supreme Division (16 clubs); First Division (20 clubs) Vladimir Region: Class I (13 clubs); Class II (13 clubs); Class III (12 clubs) Vologda Region: 21 clubs Yaroslavl Region: 9 clubs	Moscow City: Division B (13 clubs)	Moscow Region: Division B (27 clubs); Division C (32 clubs)	Belgorod Region: Championship (9 clubs); Premiership (21 clubs) Bryansk Region: Division 1 (16 clubs); Division 2 (13 clubs); Division 3 (31 clubs) Kaluga Region: Championship (10 clubs); Premiership Class I (15 clubs); Premiership Class II (6 clubs) Kursk Region: Championship (10 clubs); Premiership (10 clubs) Lipetsk Region: Championship (11 clubs); Premiership (11 clubs) Oryol Region: Championship (8 clubs); Countryside Premiership (11 clubs) Ryazan Region: 15 clubs Smolensk Region: Championship (8 clubs); Premiership (9 clubs) Tambov Region: Class I (8 clubs); Class II (24 clubs) Tula Region: 17 clubs Volgograd Region: 18 clubs Voronezh Region: Championship (11 clubs); Prosianoi Memorial (26 clubs)	Adyghea Republic: 6 clubs Astrakhan Region: Supreme League (9 clubs); First League (13 clubs) Chechen Republic: Championship (11 clubs); Premiership (28 clubs) Dagestan Republic: 12 clubs Ingushetia Republic: 17 clubs Kabardino-Balkar Republic: Supreme Division (14 clubs); First Division (14 clubs) Kalmykia Republic: 10 clubs Karachay-Cherkes Republic: 6 clubs Krasnodar Territory: Supreme League (10 clubs); First League (40 clubs) North Ossetia-Alania Republic: Supreme Division (14 clubs); First Division (10 clubs) Rostov-on-Don Region: Supreme League (13 clubs); First League (36 clubs); Second League (22 clubs) Stavropol Territory: Class I (10 clubs); Class II (8 clubs)	Chuvashia Republic: 24 clubs Mariy El Region: Supreme League (8 clubs); First League (9 clubs) Mordovia Republic: Championship (10 clubs); Mordovian Football League (18 clubs) Nizhniy Novgorod Region: 18 clubs Penza Region: Supreme League (9 clubs); First League (6 clubs) Samara Region: Championship (8 clubs); Countryside Supreme League (12 clubs); Countryside First League (11 clubs) Saratov Region: 8 clubs Tatarstan Republic: Supreme League (13 clubs); First League (13 clubs); Second League (8 clubs) Udmurt Republic: 8 clubs Ulyanovsk Region: Championship (8 clubs); Premiership (14 clubs)	Bashkortostan Republic: Championship (10 clubs); First League (8 clubs); Second League (8 clubs) Chelyabinsk Region: 14 clubs Kurgan Region: 14 clubs Omsk Region: Class I (7 clubs); Class II (8 clubs) Orenburg Region: Class I (6 clubs); Class II (8 clubs) Perm Territory: Division 1 (11 clubs); Division 2 (15 clubs) Tyumen Region: First League (8 clubs); Second League (9 clubs) Yekaterinburg Region: Class I (11 clubs); Class II (16 clubs); Class III (14 clubs)	Altay Territory: First League (8 clubs); Second League (24 clubs) Buryatia Republic: 9 clubs Irkutsk Region: 7 clubs Khakassia Republic: 9 clubs Kemerovo Region: 14 clubs Krasnoyarsk Territory: 6 clubs Novosibirsk Region: 15 clubs Tomsk Region: 7 clubs Altay Republic, Tyva Republic, Zabaykalye Territory: no league	Jewish Autonomous Region: 3+ clubs Primorye Territory: 12 clubs Sakhalin Region: 9 clubs Sakha-Yakutia Republic: 8 clubs Amur Region, Kamchatka Territory, Khabarovsk Territory, Magadan Region: no league

== National team ==
The national teams prior were the Soviet Union national football team, which was a football world power, and the transitional CIS national football team, which took part in the Euro 1992. Since the collapse of Soviet Union the Russia national team has had success in Euro 2008 before it took ten years to repeat this feat, this time as host of the 2018 FIFA World Cup. Russian team was eliminated in the group stage of the 1994 World Cup, 2002 World Cup, 2014 World Cup, Euro 1992 (as CIS), Euro 1996, Euro 2004, Euro 2012, Euro 2016 and Euro 2020. Russia didn't qualify for the major tournaments on four occasions: in 1998, 2000, 2006 and 2010. Russian team is currently ranked 35th in the FIFA World Ranking.

== Hosting the World Cup ==
On December 2, 2010, Russia was awarded the 2018 FIFA World Cup. Russia hosted the tournament for the first time, becoming the largest country to host the World Cup, a title held by the United States since 1994.

== Cup competitions ==
The main cup competition in Russia is the Russian Cup. Only professional clubs take part in it.

There is also an Amateur Football League Cup, a competition for the Amateur Football League clubs. The winners of this cup are eligible for promotion to the Second Division. Cups of federal subjects are also played.

== European competitions ==
The Russian League was in 2013 regarded as the 6th strongest league in Europe, based on the UEFA coefficient. Russian club sides used to constantly compete in the UEFA Champions League and Europa League. Over the last years Russian clubs have won three major European trophies. These are 2004–05 UEFA Cup won by CSKA Moscow, 2007–08 UEFA Cup and 2008 UEFA Super Cup won by Zenit St. Petersburg.

== Women's football ==
Women's football is not as popular in Russia as men's football, although it has increased in popularity in the 2000s.

== Football stadiums in Russia ==
Stadiums with a capacity of 40,000 or higher are included. The Grand Sports Arena of the Luzhniki Olympic Complex is the largest stadium in Russia, followed by the Gazprom Arena, the home of FC Zenit. On 24 May 2023, Zenit became the first Russian sports club with 10 million followers on social media.

#	Image	Stadium	Capacity	City	Home team(s)	Inaugurated	Renovated
1		Luzhniki Stadium	81,000	Moscow	Russia national football team, 1980 Summer Olympics and 2018 World Cup	1956	1996–1997, 2001–2004, 2013–2017
2		Gazprom Arena	67,000	Saint Petersburg	FC Zenit Saint Petersburg, 2017 Confederations Cup, 2018 World Cup and Euro 2020	2017	
3		Volgograd Arena	45,568	Volgograd	FC Rotor Volgograd, 2018 World Cup	2018	
4		Ak Bars Arena	45,379	Kazan	FC Rubin Kazan, 2017 Confederations Cup and 2018 World Cup	2013	
5		Otkrytie Arena	45,360	Moscow	FC Spartak Moscow, 2017 Confederations Cup and 2018 World Cup	2014	
6		Rostov Arena	45,000	Rostov-on-Don	FC Rostov, 2018 World Cup	2018	
7		Cosmos Arena	44,918	Samara	FC Krylya Sovetov, 2018 World Cup	2018	
8		Strelka Stadium	44,899	Nizhny Novgorod	FC Nizhny Novgorod, 2018 World Cup	2018	
9		Mordovia Arena	44,442	Saransk	FC Mordovia Saransk, 2018 World Cup	2018	
10		Fisht Olympic Stadium	40,000	Sochi	PFC Sochi; 2014 Winter Olympics, 2017 Confederations Cup and 2018 World Cup	2013	

== Attendances ==
The average attendance per top-flight football league season and the club with the highest average attendance:

Year	League average	Best club	Best club average
2025	12,104	Zenit	35,691
2024	11,162	Zenit	28,159
2023	9,462	Zenit	31,236
2022	—	—	—
2021	—	—	—
2020	17,393	Zenit	47,700
2019	16,723	Zenit	48,122
2018	13,969	Zenit	43,963
2017	11,333	Spartak	32,760
2016	11,085	Spartak	25,179
2015	10,306	Spartak	25,001
2014	11,620	Zenit	18,952
2013	13,180	Kuban	20,934
2012	12,903	Kuban	20,786
2010	12,250	Spartak	23,450
2009	12,517	Spartak	25,253
2008	13,334	Krylia Sovetov	21,700
2007	13,543	Spartak	24,067
2006	11,890	Zenit	21,954
2005	12,241	Krylia Sovetov	20,833
2004	11,574	Krylia Sovetov	25,500
2003	11,737	Krylia Sovetov	26,393
2002	11,643	Alania	22,933
2001	12,404	Krylia Sovetov	23,933
2000	11,820	Fakel	23,120
1999	10,886	Alania	21,400
1998	10,381	Alania	26,333
1997	10,943	Alania	27,176
1996	9,813	Alania	27,547
1995	9,228	Alania	33,467

== See also ==
- Football in Crimea
- Football in Moscow
- Sport in Russia
- Russian national football team
- List of football stadiums in Russia
