= Igor Makarov (footballer, born 1961) =

Russian footballer

Personal information
- Full name: Igor Vladimirovich Makarov
- Date of birth: 6 February 1961 (age 65)
- Place of birth: Moscow, Russia
- Height: 1.84 m (6 ft 1/2 in)
- Positions: Defender; forward

Youth career
- FShM Moscow

Senior career*
Years	Team	Apps	(Gls)
1979	FC Torpedo Moscow	0	(0)
1980	FShM Moscow	40	(7)
1981–1982	FC Krasnaya Presnya Moscow	56	(13)
1983–1987	FC Lokomotiv Moscow	158	(9)
1988–1991	FC Shinnik Yaroslavl	162	(39)
1992	FC Asmaral Moscow	21	(4)
1993	RS Settat		
1993	FC Asmaral Moscow	11	(2)
1994–1995	FC Zhemchuzhina Sochi	51	(9)
1996	FC Dynamo-Zhemchuzhina-2 Sochi	29	(8)
1997	FC Avtomobilist Noginsk	38	(5)
1998	FC Mosenergo Moscow	17	(2)
2001	FC BSK Spirovo		
- * Club domestic league appearances and goals

Igor Vladimirovich Makarov (Russian: Игорь Владимирович Макаров; born 6 February 1961) is a former Russian professional footballer.

== Club career ==
He made his professional debut in the Soviet Second League in 1980 for FShM Moscow.
