= Aleksandr Antonov (footballer) =

Russian footballer and coach

Personal information
- Full name: Aleksandr Anatolyevich Antonov
- Date of birth: 6 July 1958 (age 68)
- Place of birth: Bolshevo, Russian SFSR
- Height: 1.84 m (6 ft 1/2 in)
- Position: Forward

Senior career*
Years	Team	Apps	(Gls)
1981	FC Traktor Pavlodar	14	(1)
1984–1985	FC Kuzbass Kemerovo	72	(23)
1986	FC Rotor Volgograd	17	(7)
1986–1987	FC Kuzbass Kemerovo	49	(13)
1988	FC Rostselmash Rostov-on-Don	19	(2)
1988	FC Saturn Ramenskoye	13	(4)
1989–1990	FC Oka Kolomna	46	(27)
1990–1991	FC Asmaral Moscow	31	(16)
1992	FC Interros Moskovsky	14	(9)
1993	FC Viktor-Avangard Kolomna	26	(18)
1994–1996	FC Spartak Shchyolkovo	68	(36)

Managerial career
- 1998: FC Asmaral Moscow
- 1999: FC Fabus Bronnitsy
- 2002: FC Spartak Shchyolkovo (assistant)
- 2002: FC Spartak Shchyolkovo
- 2003: FC Severstal Cherepovets
- 2004: FC Spartak Lukhovitsy
- 2008: FC Zodiak Stary Oskol
- * Club domestic league appearances and goals

Aleksandr Anatolyevich Antonov (Russian: Александр Анатольевич Антонов; born 6 July 1958) is a Russian professional football coach and a former player.
