= Andrei Lapushkin =

Russian footballer

Personal information
- Full name: Andrei Veniaminovich Lapushkin
- Date of birth: 9 November 1965 (age 60)
- Place of birth: Leningrad, Russian SFSR
- Height: 1.63 m (5 ft 4 in)
- Position: Forward

Senior career*
Years	Team	Apps	(Gls)
1983	FC Dynamo Leningrad	2	(0)
1985	FC Zenit Leningrad	0	(0)
1986–1988	FC Dynamo Leningrad	88	(11)
1989–1990	FC Kirovets Leningrad	53	(12)
1990–1991	FC Zenit St. Petersburg	12	(0)
1991	FC Kirovets St. Petersburg	39	(12)
1992–1995	FC Saturn-1991 St. Petersburg	125	(53)
1995–1997	FC Lantana Tallinn	28	(11)
1997	FC Dynamo St. Petersburg	33	(4)
- * Club domestic league appearances and goals

Andrei Veniaminovich Lapushkin (Russian: Андрей Вениаминович Лапушкин; born 9 November 1965) is a former Russian professional football player.

== Club career ==
He made his Russian Football National League debut for FC Smena-Saturn Saint Petersburg on 3 April 1993 in a game against FC Asmaral Kislovodsk. He played 3 seasons in the FNL for Saturn.

== Honours ==
- Russian Second Division Zone 4 top scorer: 1992 (25 goals).
