= Andrei Novgorodov =

Russian footballer

Personal information
- Full name: Andrei Anatolyevich Novgorodov
- Date of birth: 18 May 1969 (age 57)
- Place of birth: Moscow, Russia
- Height: 1.82 m (6 ft 0 in)
- Positions: Defender; midfielder

Senior career*
Years	Team	Apps	(Gls)
1986	FC Dynamo-2 Moscow	1	(2)
1986–1988	FC Dynamo Moscow (reserves)		
1988–1989	FC Dynamo-2 Moscow	24	(4)
1989–1991	FC Dynamo Moscow	4	(0)
1991–1992	FC Asmaral Moscow	35	(4)
1992	FC Presnya Moscow	6	(0)
1993	FC Torpedo Moscow	18	(1)
1994–1997	FC Zhemchuzhina Sochi	106	(13)
1998–2002	FC Shinnik Yaroslavl	105	(11)
2008	FC Senezh Solnechnogorsk		
- * Club domestic league appearances and goals

Andrei Anatolyevich Novgorodov (Russian: Андрей Анатольевич Новгородов; born 18 May 1969) is a former Russian professional footballer.

== Club career ==
He made his professional debut in the Soviet Second League in 1986 for FC Dynamo-2 Moscow. He played 4 games in the UEFA Intertoto Cup 1998 for FC Shinnik Yaroslavl.

== Honours ==
- Russian Cup winner: 1993.
