= Aleksandr Sudarikov =

Russian footballer

Personal information
- Full name: Aleksandr Borisovich Sudarikov
- Date of birth: 23 August 1969 (age 57)
- Place of birth: Moscow, Soviet Union
- Height: 1.69 m (5 ft 6 1/2 in)
- Position: Midfielder

Youth career
- 1985–1989: EShVSM Moscow

Senior career*
Years	Team	Apps	(Gls)
1988–1989	EShVSM Moscow	50	(5)
1990–1991	Volga Tver	64	(8)
1992	Dynamo-Gazovik Tyumen	4	(0)
1992–1994	Torpedo Moscow	10	(0)
1995–1996	Abahani Krira Chakra		
1997	Dynamo Barnaul	29	(2)
1998–1999	Kolomna	42	(7)
2000	Dinamo Brest	8	(0)
- * Club domestic league appearances and goals as of 1 January 2009

Aleksandr Borisovich Sudarikov (Russian: Александр Борисович Судариков; born 23 August 1969) is a retired Russian professional footballer. He made his professional debut in the Soviet Second League in 1988 for SK EShVSM Moscow.

== Honours ==
- Russian Cup winner: 1993.
