= Vladimir Mikhaylov (footballer) =

Russian football player and coach (1939–2026)

Personal information
- Full name: Vladimir Alekseyevich Mikhaylov
- Date of birth: 7 October 1939
- Place of birth: Odesa, Ukrainian SSR, USSR
- Date of death: 29 March 2026 (aged 86)
- Height: 1.78 m (5 ft 10 in)
- Positions: Midfielder; forward

Youth career
- Khimik Dzerzhinsk

Senior career*
| Years | Team | Apps | (Gls) |
| 1958–1959 | Khimik Dzerzhinsk | | |
| 1960 | Zarya Dzerzhinsk | 28 | (2) |
| 1961–1962 | Raketa Gorky | | |
| 1963–1964 | Volga Gorky | 62 | (13) |
| 1965–1967 | Torpedo Moscow | 51 | (14) |
| 1967–1968 | Lokomotiv Moscow | 24 | (1) |
| 1968–1969 | Torpedo Moscow | 47 | (9) |
| 1970 | Volga Kalinin | 8 | (4) |
| 1970–1971 | Trud Voronezh | 44 | (7) |
| 1971–1972 | Frezer Moscow | | |

Managerial career
- 1976: Torpedo Vladimir (assistant)
- 1976: Torpedo Vladimir
- 1977: Kuban Krasnodar (assistant)
- 1978–1979: Metallurg Lipetsk
- 1980: Kuban Krasnodar
- 1981–1982: Rubin Kazan
- 1984: Rubin Kazan (assistant)
- 1985–1987: Rubin Kazan
- 1987–1988: Metallurg Lipetsk
- 1989: Stal Cheboksary
- 1990: Znamya Truda Orekhovo-Zuyevo
- 1991: Tsement Novorossiysk
- 1993: Asmaral-d Moscow
- 1994–1997: Asmaral Moscow (assistant)
- 1997–1998: Asmaral Moscow
- * Club domestic league appearances and goals

Vladimir Alekseyevich Mikhaylov (Russian: Владимир Алексеевич Михайлов; 7 October 1939 – 29 March 2026) was a Russian professional football coach and a player.

Mikhaylov died on 29 March 2026, at the age of 86.

== Honours ==
- Soviet Top League: 1965, bronze 1968
- Soviet Cup: 1968
