= Oleg Dmitriyev (footballer, born 1973) =

Russian footballer

Personal information
- Full name: Oleg Vladimirovich Dmitriyev
- Date of birth: 31 March 1973 (age 53)
- Place of birth: Leningrad, Russian SFSR
- Height: 1.85 m (6 ft 1 in)
- Positions: Forward; midfielder

Youth career
- Elektrosila Leningrad

Senior career*
| Years | Team | Apps | (Gls) |
| 1990–1998 | FC Zenit St. Petersburg | 210 | (20) |
| 1997–1998 | → FC Zenit-d St. Petersburg | 14 | (0) |
| 1999 | FC Rubin Kazan | 24 | (3) |
| 2000–2001 | FC Dynamo-SPb St. Petersburg | 40 | (7) |
| 2002 | FC Metallurg Lipetsk | 7 | (0) |
| 2002 | FC Petrotrest St. Petersburg (amateur) | | |
| 2003 | FC Petrotrest St. Petersburg | 27 | (3) |
| 2004–2005 | FC Zenit-2 St. Petersburg | 20 | (2) |
| 2005 | FC Avangard St. Petersburg | | |

International career
| 1993–1994 | Russia U-21 | 5 | (0) |
- * Club domestic league appearances and goals

Oleg Vladimirovich Dmitriyev (Russian: Олег Владимирович Дмитриев; born 31 March 1973) is a Russian former professional footballer.

== Club career ==
He made his professional debut in the Soviet First League in 1990 for FC Zenit Leningrad.

== Post-playing career ==
After his retirement he works as a firefighter.

== Honours ==
- Russian Cup winner: 1999 (played in the early stages of the 1998/99 tournament for FC Zenit St. Petersburg).
