= FC Spartak Gorno-Altaysk =

- Full name: Football Club Spartak Gorno-Altaysk
- Founded: 1992
- Dissolved: 2006
- League: Amateur Football League, Zone Siberia
- 2005: 9th

FC Spartak Gorno-Altaysk (Russian: «Спартак» (Горно‑Алтайск)) was a Russian football team from Gorno-Altaysk. It played professionally in 1992 in the Russian Second Division, taking 11th place in Zone 6.
