= Dmitri Petrenko =

Russian footballer and coach (born 1966)

Personal information
- Full name: Dmitri Aleksandrovich Petrenko
- Date of birth: 18 June 1966 (age 60)
- Height: 1.81 m (5 ft 11 1/2 in)
- Position: Forward

Senior career*
Years	Team	Apps	(Gls)
1984–1985	FC Torpedo Volzhsky	26	(3)
1989	FC Torpedo Volzhsky	42	(14)
1990–1991	FC Rotor Volgograd	30	(1)
1991–1992	FC Torpedo Volzhsky	62	(31)
1992–1995	SV Waldhof Mannheim	53	(11)
1996	FC Metallurg Lipetsk	14	(4)
1997	FC Torpedo Volzhsky	31	(5)
1998	FC Druzhba Maykop	41	(12)
1999	FC Nasha Kompaniya Astana	24	(9)
2000	FC Balakovo	5	(3)
2001	FC Khopyor Balashov	14	(1)
2003	FC Tekstilshchik Kamyshin	34	(8)
2005–2006	FC Tekstilshchik Kamyshin	37	(5)
2007	FC Torpedo Volzhsky	2	(0)

Managerial career
- 2004–2005: FC Tekstilshchik Kamyshin (assistant)
- 2008–2012: FC Energiya Volzhsky
- 2012: FC Olimpia Volgograd
- 2013: FC Sever Murmansk
- 2014–2015: FC Torpedo Armavir
- 2016: FC Baikal Irkutsk
- 2016–2017: FC Afips Afipsky
- 2017–2018: FC Rotor-2 Volgograd
- * Club domestic league appearances and goals

Dmitri Aleksandrovich Petrenko (Russian: Дмитрий Александрович Петренко; born 18 June 1966) is a Russian professional football coach and a former player.

== Club career ==
As a player, he made his debut in the Soviet Second League in 1984 for Torpedo Volzhsky.

== Personal life ==
He is the father of Russian footballer Anton Petrenko.
