= Sergei Chumachenko =

Russian footballer

Personal information
- Full name: Sergei Leonidovich Chumachenko
- Date of birth: 14 February 1973 (age 53)
- Height: 1.73 m (5 ft 8 in)
- Positions: Forward; midfielder

Youth career
- SDYuShOR-3 Sovetsky Raion Moscow

Senior career*
Years	Team	Apps	(Gls)
1991	FC Torpedo Moscow	0	(0)
1991	FC Torpedo Mytishchi	2	(0)
1992–1995	FC Torpedo Moscow	73	(7)
1995–1999	FC Torpedo Arzamas	108	(12)
2000	FC Spartak-Orekhovo Orekhovo-Zuyevo	3	(0)
- * Club domestic league appearances and goals

Sergei Leonidovich Chumachenko (Russian: Серге́й Леонидович Чумаченко; born 14 February 1973) is a former Russian professional footballer.

== Club career ==
He made his professional debut in the Soviet Second League B in 1991 for FC Torpedo Mytishchi. He played 1 game in the UEFA Cup Winners' Cup 1993–94 for FC Torpedo Moscow.

== Honours ==
- Russian Cup winner: 1993.
