= Albert Andreyev =

Russian footballer

Personal information
- Full name: Albert Vladimirovich Andreyev
- Date of birth: April 8, 1968 (age 58)
- Place of birth: Izhevsk, Russian SFSR
- Height: 1.74 m (5 ft 8 1/2 in)
- Positions: Midfielder; forward

Senior career*
Years	Team	Apps	(Gls)
1988–1989	FC Uralmash Sverdlovsk	8	(3)
1989	FC Zenit Izhevsk	29	(5)
1990	FC Rotor Volgograd	0	(0)
1990–1991	FC Zenit Izhevsk	43	(15)
1991–1994	FC Uralmash Yekaterinburg	106	(27)
1995–1997	FC Gazovik-Gazprom Izhevsk	76	(21)
1998	FC Uralmash Yekaterinburg	11	(0)
1999	FC Gazovik-Gazprom Izhevsk	18	(2)

Managerial career
- 2009–2010: FC SOYUZ-Gazprom Izhevsk (administrator)
- * Club domestic league appearances and goals

Albert Vladimirovich Andreyev (Russian: Альберт Владимирович Андреев; born April 8, 1968) is a retired Russian professional footballer.

He made his professional debut in the Soviet Second League in 1988 for FC Uralmash Sverdlovsk.
