= Oleg Safronov =

Russian footballer

Personal information
- Full name: Oleg Aleksandrovich Safronov
- Date of birth: 24 February 1967 (age 59)
- Place of birth: Voronezh, Russian SFSR
- Height: 1.78 m (5 ft 10 in)
- Position: Defender

Youth career
- DYuSShOR-15 Voronezh
- FC Fakel Voronezh

Senior career*
Years	Team	Apps	(Gls)
1983–1986	FC Fakel Voronezh	3	(0)
1986–1988	FC Dynamo Bryansk	86	(2)
1989	FC Khimik Semiluki	40	(2)
1990–1991	FC Buran Voronezh	71	(0)
1992–1994	FC Fakel Voronezh	69	(0)
1995	FC Arsenal Tula	27	(0)
1996	FC MChS-Selyatino Selyatino	39	(2)
1997	FC CSK VVS-Kristall Smolensk	4	(0)
1998	FC Fakel Voronezh	1	(0)
1998–2002	FC Lokomotiv Liski	128	(2)
- * Club domestic league appearances and goals

Oleg Aleksandrovich Safronov (Russian: Олег Александрович Сафронов; born 24 February 1967) is a former Russian football player.
