= Albert Fedosov =

Russian footballer

Personal information
- Full name: Albert Vyacheslavovich Fedosov
- Date of birth: 4 September 1970 (age 56)
- Height: 1.80 m (5 ft 11 in)
- Position: Midfielder

Youth career
- FC Svetotekhnika Saransk

Senior career*
Years	Team	Apps	(Gls)
1987–1988	FC Fakel Saransk		
1988	FC Svetotekhnika Saransk		
1989	FC Fakel Saransk		
1989	FC Burevestnik Saransk		
1989–1992	FC Svetotekhnika Saransk	126	(21)
1993–1994	FC Fakel Voronezh	43	(4)
1995	FC Chernomorets Novorossiysk	14	(0)
1996	FC Uralan Elista	19	(0)
1996	→ FC Uralan-d Elista (loan)	2	(0)
1997–2001	FC Kristall Smolensk	134	(9)
2002	FC Lokomotiv-NN Nizhny Novgorod (amateur)		
2003–2004	FC Dynamo Bryansk	62	(8)
2005	FC Avangard Kursk	20	(0)
2006–2007	FC Smolensk	58	(1)
2008	FC Dnepr Smolensk (amateur)		
2009–2010	FC Rudnya		
2011	FC Sloboda Krasnoslobodsk		
2012	FC Spartak Kovylkino		

Managerial career
- 2011: FC Sloboda Krasnoslobodsk (assistant)
- 2012: FC Spartak Kovylkino (assistant)
- * Club domestic league appearances and goals

Albert Vyacheslavovich Fedosov (Russian: Альберт Вячеславович Федосов; born 4 September 1970) is a former Russian football player.
