= FC Metallurg Aldan =

- Full name: Football Club Metallurg Aldan
- Founded: 1992
- Dissolved: 1994
- 1993: Russian First Division, Zone East, 8th

FC Metallurg Aldan (Russian: ФК «Металлург» Алдан) was a Russian football team from Aldan. It played professionally in 1992 and 1993 (in 1993 it played in the second-highest Russian First Division).
