= Vyacheslav Bakharev =

Russian footballer

Personal information
- Full name: Vyacheslav Vladimirovich Bakharev
- Date of birth: 22 March 1973 (age 53)
- Place of birth: Sverdlovsk, Russian SFSR
- Height: 1.80 m (5 ft 11 in)
- Positions: Forward; midfielder

Youth career
- FC Uralmash Sverdlovsk

Senior career*
Years	Team	Apps	(Gls)
1991	FC Torpedo Miass	0	(0)
1991–1995	FC Uralmash Yekaterinburg	30	(1)
1993	→ FC Uralelektromed Verkhnyaya Pyshma (loan)	9	(0)
1994–1995	→ FC Uralmash-d Yekaterinburg (loans)	28	(4)
1996–1997	FC Nosta Novotroitsk	78	(2)
1997–1999	FC Chornomorets Odesa	27	(0)
1999–2003	FC Ural Sverdlovsk Oblast	100	(6)
- * Club domestic league appearances and goals

Vyacheslav Vladimirovich Bakharev (Russian: Вячеслав Владимирович Бахарев; born 22 March 1973 in Sverdlovsk) is a former Russian football player.
