= FC Galaks Saint Petersburg =

- Full name: Football Club Galaks Saint Petersburg
- Founded: 1991
- Dissolved: 1996
- League: Russian Second Division, Zone 4
- 1992: 19th

FC Galaks Saint Petersburg (Russian: «Галакс» (Санкт‑Петербург)) was a Russian football team from Saint Petersburg. It played professionally for one season in 1992, taking 19th place in Zone 4 of the Russian Second Division.

In 1994 and 1995 it competed in futsal.

== Team name history ==
- 1991: FC Biosvyaz-Student St. Petersburg
- 1992–1995: FC Galaks St. Petersburg
