= Mikhail Solovyov (footballer, born 1968) =

Russian footballer

Personal information
- Full name: Mikhail Nikolayevich Solovyov
- Date of birth: 23 December 1968 (age 57)
- Place of birth: Moscow, Russian SFSR
- Height: 1.87 m (6 ft 1 1/2 in)
- Position: Defender

Youth career
- PFC CSKA Moscow

Senior career*
Years	Team	Apps	(Gls)
1986	PFC CSKA-2 Moscow	22	(0)
1987	PFC CSKA Moscow	1	(0)
1988	PFC CSKA-2 Moscow	37	(2)
1989–1992	FC Torpedo Moscow	53	(0)
1992	Seongnam Ilhwa Chunma	2	(0)
1993–1994	FC Torpedo Moscow	38	(0)
1995	Visby IF Gute	16	(1)
1996	FC Dynamo-Gazovik Tyumen	13	(0)
1997	FC Torpedo-ZIL Moscow	17	(2)
1998–2000	FC Spartak-Chukotka Moscow	54	(4)
2000	FC Krasnoznamensk	13	(0)
2001	FK Liepājas Metalurgs	19	(0)

Managerial career
- 2002–2005: FC Moscow (academy)
- 2003: FC Oryol (assistant)
- 2006–2008: FC Moscow (reserves)
- 2009: FC Moscow (scout)
- 2010: FC Torpedo Moscow (assistant)
- 2011–2012: Russia U17
- 2012–2013: Kazakhstan U19
- 2014: FC Bayterek
- 2016: FC Zenit Penza
- 2019: FC Khimki-M
- * Club domestic league appearances and goals

Mikhail Nikolayevich Solovyov (Russian: Михаил Николаевич Соловьёв; born 23 December 1968) is a Russian professional football coach and a former player.

== Club career ==
He made his professional debut in the Soviet Top League in 1987 for PFC CSKA Moscow.

== Honours ==
- Soviet Top League bronze: 1991.
- Soviet Cup finalist: 1989, 1991.
- Russian Cup winner: 1993.
- Latvian Higher League 3rd place: 2001.

== European club competitions ==
With FC Torpedo Moscow.

- UEFA Cup Winners' Cup 1989–90: 3 games.
- UEFA Cup 1990–91: 3 games.
- UEFA Cup 1991–92: 3 games.
- UEFA Cup Winners' Cup 1993–94: 1 game.
