= Valentin Kiselyov =

Russian footballer

Personal information
- Full name: Valentin Gennadyevich Kiselyov
- Date of birth: 21 January 1970 (age 56)
- Place of birth: Tula, Russian SFSR
- Height: 1.81 m (5 ft 11 1/2 in)
- Position: Forward

Youth career
- FC Metallurg Tula

Senior career*
Years	Team	Apps	(Gls)
1987–1988	FC Arsenal Tula	44	(5)
1990	PFC CSKA-2 Moscow	29	(3)
1991	FC Arsenal Tula	40	(18)
1992–1993	FC Lokomotiv Moscow	17	(3)
1992–1993	→ FC Lokomotiv-d Moscow (loans)	18	(5)
1993–1997	FC Arsenal Tula	139	(27)
1998	FC Don Novomoskovsk	28	(4)
1999	FC Spartak Ryazan	6	(0)
2000	FC Don Novomoskovsk	7	(0)
2000–2002	FC Energetik Uren	35	(7)
- * Club domestic league appearances and goals

Valentin Gennadyevich Kiselyov (Russian: Валентин Геннадьевич Киселёв; born 21 January 1970) is a former Russian football player.
