= Andrey Vlasov (footballer) =

Russian footballer

Personal information
- Full name: Andrey Vladimirovich Vlasov
- Date of birth: 28 February 1965 (age 61)
- Height: 1.85 m (6 ft 1 in)
- Positions: Defender; midfielder

Youth career
- FC Geolog Tyumen

Senior career*
Years	Team	Apps	(Gls)
1981–1982	FC Fakel Tyumen	16	(0)
1984–1986	FC Geolog Tyumen	24	(0)
1989–1992	FC Dynamo-Gazovik Tyumen	101	(4)
1993	FC Sibir Kurgan	25	(5)
1994–1996	FC Irtysh Tobolsk	53	(1)
- * Club domestic league appearances and goals

Andrey Vladimirovich Vlasov (Russian: Андрей Владимирович Власов; born 28 February 1965) is a Russian former football player.
