= Andrei Smirnov (footballer, born 1962) =

Soviet and Russian footballer

Personal information
- Full name: Andrei Vasilyevich Smirnov
- Date of birth: 19 September 1962 (age 64)
- Height: 1.82 m (5 ft 11 1/2 in)
- Position: Midfielder

Senior career*
Years	Team	Apps	(Gls)
1979–1981	FC Amur Komsomolsk-na-Amure		
1982	FC SKA Khabarovsk	0	(0)
1983–1984	FC Okean Nakhodka		
1987–1993	FC Okean Nakhodka	224	(13)
1993	→ FC Okean-d Nakhodka (loan)	2	(0)
1994	FC Luch Vladivostok	33	(1)
- * Club domestic league appearances and goals

Andrei Vasilyevich Smirnov (Russian: Андрей Васильевич Смирнов; born 19 September 1962) is a former Russian football player.
