= FC Skat-5s Yelabuga =

- Full name: Football Club Skat-5s Yelabuga
- Founded: 1992
- Dissolved: 1993
- League: Russian Second Division, Zone 5
- 1992: 11th

FC Skat-5s Yelabuga (Russian: «Скат‑5с» (Елабуга)) was a Russian football team from Yelabuga. It played professionally for one season in 1992 in the Russian Second Division.
