= Murad Zekokh =

Russian footballer and coach

Personal information
- Full name: Murad Daudovich Zekokh
- Date of birth: 1 July 1969 (age 57)
- Height: 1.70 m (5 ft 7 in)
- Position: Midfielder

Youth career
- DYuSSh Maykop

Senior career*
Years	Team	Apps	(Gls)
1986–1987	PFC Spartak Nalchik	25	(1)
1989–1991	FC Druzhba Maykop	102	(15)
1992	FC Kuban Krasnodar	3	(0)
1992–1993	FC Druzhba Maykop	72	(18)
1994–1995	FC Zhemchuzhina Sochi	35	(1)
1996–1997	FC Gazovik-Gazprom Izhevsk	63	(6)
1998	FC Kuzbass Kemerovo	14	(6)
1998–1999	FC Gazovik-Gazprom Izhevsk	34	(3)
2000	FC Tsentr-R-Kavkaz (amateur)		
2002	FC Nemkom Krasnodar	35	(2)
2003	FC Spartak Anapa	36	(2)
2004	FC Spartak-UGP Anapa (amateur)		
2005–2006	FC Spartak-UGP Anapa	36	(5)

Managerial career
- 2008: FC Druzhba Maykop (assistant)
- 2009: FC Torpedo Armavir (assistant)
- 2010: FC Druzhba Maykop
- 2014–2017: FC Omega Kurganinsk
- * Club domestic league appearances and goals

Murad Daudovich Zekokh (Russian: Мурад Даудович Зекох; born 1 July 1969) is a Russian professional football coach and a former player.
