= Sergey Sergeev (spree killer) =

Soviet spree killer

- Born: Sergey Aleksandrovich Sergeev; June 21, 1964; UkSSR
- Died: 1989 (aged 24–25); UkSSR
- Cause of death: Execution by shooting
- Other name: "The Zaporizhzhia Maniac"
- Conviction: Murder
- Penalty: Death

Details
- Victims: 5
- Span of crimes: June 27 – July 12, 1987
- Country: Ukraine
- States: Zaporizhia, Yalta
- Date apprehended: July 17, 1987
- Imprisoned at: Unknown

Sergey Aleksandrovich Sergeev (June 21, 1964 – 1989), known as The Zaporizhzhia Maniac, was a Soviet spree killer who killed four people in Zaporizhzhia and Yalta in 1987.

== Biography ==
Sergeev was born on June 21, 1964. He studied at Zaporozhye Boarding School No. 2. While still a minor, he was sentenced to a year in prison for hooliganism. After his release, he worked as a photographer at the Zaporozhia mining company. He often clashed with his mother, who once wrote a statement to the police about him, and Sergey was detained at the Zhovtevy ROVD. He was diagnosed with a psychoneurological disorder. According to different versions, he either fled from there, or managed to convince the staff that he was not insane.

== Murders ==
He committed his first murder on June 27, 1987, in Yalta. He met a student named Tatyana Novik, from Leningrad, and proposed marriage only a few days later. When she refused, he strangled her in a fit of rage and then fled, leaving a note on the corpse:

Goodbye my love, I'll be with you soon!

Sergeev often left notes at the locations of his crimes, and once even left an audio cassette containing various threats and bullying directed at the officers:

People are dying like flies! <...> Where are you looking, eh? I am near you! Always going to be near you, and no one will stop me! <...> I will try to show you on TV, because every day I will kill people! Who will be the next victim, eh? Only I know this!!!... <...> ...I jumped on the tram, the people were looking there, so I turned away. <...> Now there will be children! To be continued!!! <...> I will kill, kill, kill so that people are afraid of me in this neighborhood!

At the site of another murder (that of Alla Boyko), he left a note drenched in the victim's blood: "People are dying like flies."

On June 29 Sergeev broke into a factory on Dzerzhinsky Street in Zaporizhzhia, stole several ushankas (Russian fur hats with ear flaps) and gold ornaments, and killed a cleaning woman, Natalia Yurchenko. On the same day he broke into his ex-girlfriend's apartment and stabbed her new boyfriend several times with a knife.

Sergeev then moved to Dnipropetrovsk Oblast. He wounded a farm manager in the Synelnykove Raion (district) and stole 650 rubles from the farm's collective fund, then hid out in the steppe and local villages. On July 9, 1987, he returned to Zaporizhzhia, bursting into an apartment on Paramanov Street and inflicting serious wounds on nine-year-old Lena Novikova. On July 10 he broke into an apartment on Gorky Street and killed 84-year-old Alla Boyko. On July 12, he attacked two teenagers with a knife while they were bathing in a pond near a village in the Prymorsk Raion, but both of them survived.

== Arrest ==
Residents of Zaporizhzhia began to panic. To catch the killer, servicemen, troops, fire brigade workers, aviation crews and volunteers were organized in the 587 settlements of Zaporizhzhia Oblast. The head of the search operations was Alexander Polyak, who would later become mayor of Zaporizhzhia. On July 17, 1987, Sergeev was found near the state-run farm Mokryanka, and was finally detained near the village of Krinichka. He attempted to resist arrest by throwing a knife at police, but an officer shot him in the leg and he was taken into custody.

== Trial and execution ==
Sergeev attempted an insanity plea, bolstering his case by killing another prisoner. Despite this attempt, he was sentenced to death and subsequently executed by firing squad in 1989.
