= Aleksei Bolshakov =

Russian footballer

Personal information
- Full name: Aleksei Ivanovich Bolshakov
- Date of birth: 25 May 1966 (age 60)
- Height: 1.85 m (6 ft 1 in)
- Position: Defender

Youth career
- SDYuSShOR-4 Volzhsky

Senior career*
Years	Team	Apps	(Gls)
1984–1985	FC Torpedo Volzhsky	35	(0)
1986–1991	FC Rotor Volgograd	116	(1)
1991–1996	FC Torpedo Volzhsky	163	(9)
1996–1997	FC Energiya Kamyshin	29	(2)
1997	→ FC Energiya-d Kamyshin (loan)	1	(0)
1997	FC Torpedo Volzhsky	14	(0)
1998	FC Druzhba Maykop	38	(3)
1999	FC Zhenis	24	(1)
2000–2002	FC Svetotekhnika Saransk	74	(4)
2003–2004	FC Tekstilshchik Kamyshin	54	(2)
2005	FC Urozhay-Agro Yelan		
2006	FC Neftyanik Zhirnovsk		
2007	FC Burovik Zhirnovsk		
2009	FC Vodnik Kalach-na-Donu		
- * Club domestic league appearances and goals

Aleksei Ivanovich Bolshakov (Russian: Алексей Иванович Большаков; born 25 May 1966) is a former Russian football player.
