= FC Saturn-1991 Saint Petersburg =

- Full name: Football Club Saturn-1991 Saint Petersburg
- Founded: 1991; 34 years ago
- Dissolved: 1996; 29 years ago
- 1995: Russian First Division, 19th

FC Saturn-1991 Saint Petersburg (Russian: ФК «Сатурн‑1991» Санкт‑Петербург) was a Russian football team from Saint Petersburg. It played professionally from 1992 to 1995, including 3 seasons (1993–1995) in the second-highest Russian First Division. In 1996 it merged with FC Lokomotiv Saint Petersburg. Before 1995 it was called FC Smena-Saturn Saint Petersburg.
