= Oleg Umurzakov =

Russian footballer

Personal information
- Full name: Oleg Irikovich Umurzakov
- Date of birth: 14 September 1967 (age 59)
- Place of birth: Volgograd, Russian SFSR
- Height: 1.76 m (5 ft 9 1/2 in)
- Positions: Midfielder; forward

Senior career*
| Years | Team | Apps | (Gls) |
| 1985–1986 | FC Torpedo Volzhsky | 45 | (7) |
| 1989–1996 | FC Torpedo Volzhsky | 283 | (66) |
| 1997 | FC Lada-Grad Dimitrovgrad | 16 | (2) |
- * Club domestic league appearances and goals

Oleg Irikovich Umurzakov (Russian: Олег Ирикович Умурзаков; born 14 September 1967) is a former Russian professional football player.

== Club career ==
He made his Russian Football National League debut for FC Torpedo Volzhsky on 25 April 1992 in a game against FC Atommash Volgodonsk. He played 5 seasons in the FNL for Torpedo and Lada-Grad.

== Honours ==
- Russian Second Division Zone Center top scorer: 1994 (20 goals).
