= Dmitri Kuznetsov (footballer, born 1972) =

Russian footballer (1972–2021)

Personal information
- Full name: Dmitri Anatolyevich Kuznetsov
- Date of birth: 14 August 1972
- Place of birth: Moscow, Russian SFSR
- Date of death: 1 July 2021 (aged 48)
- Place of death: Moscow, Russia
- Height: 1.81 m (5 ft 11 in)
- Position: Midfielder

Youth career
- SDYuShOR-3 Sovetsogo Rayona Moscow

Senior career*
Years	Team	Apps	(Gls)
1989–1994	FC Torpedo Moscow	20	(1)
1992–1994	→ FC Torpedo-d Moscow	81	(11)
1995–1999	FC Lada Dimitrovgrad	176	(10)
2000	FC Arsenal Tula	13	(1)
2000	FC Khimki	5	(0)
2001	FC Metallurg Lipetsk	9	(1)
2001	FC Kolomna	18	(1)
2002	FC Gazovik-Gazprom Izhevsk	12	(0)
2003	FC Volga Ulyanovsk	13	(0)
2004	FC Saturn Yegoryevsk	32	(1)
2005–2006	FC Zvezda Serpukhov	50	(7)

International career
1993	Russia U-21	1	(0)
- * Club domestic league appearances and goals

Dmitri Anatolyevich Kuznetsov (Russian: Дмитрий Анатольевич Кузнецов; born 14 August 1972, died 1 July 2021) was a Russian professional footballer.

== Club career ==
He made his professional debut in the Russian Premier League in 1992 for FC Torpedo Moscow.

== Honours ==
- Russian Cup winner: 1993.
