= FC Dukat Moscow =

- Full name: Football Club Dukat Moscow
- Founded: 1924
- Ground: Dukat Stadium

FC Dukat Moscow (Russian: ФК «Дукат» Москва) was a Soviet football team based in Moscow. It was founded in 1924. Tobacco Factory, "Ducat" was one of the largest enterprises in Moscow, and sports on her paid much attention. Factory racing circles refer to the union of food industry. In spring of 1931, it started its professional history the championship of Krasnopresnensky District, and in the autumn 1931 playing in the second group of Moscow Championship. In 1932–1933, team appears in the first group, and since 1934 gradually falls out of Moscow's leading clubs.

== Honours ==
- Moscow Championship:
  - Runners-up: 1933, autumn.
