= FC Iskra Novoaleksandrovsk =

Russian football club

- Full name: Football Club Iskra Novoaleksandrovsk
- Founded: 1992
- League: Russian Second Division, Zone 2
- 1992: 16th

FC Iskra Novoaleksandrovsk (Russian: «Искра» (Новоалександровск)) is a Russian football team from Novoalexandrovsk. It played professionally for one season in 1992, taking 16th place in Zone 2 of the Russian Second Division. It has played on the lower amateur levels since.
