= Yevgeni Zaytsev (footballer, born 1968) =

Russian footballer

Personal information
- Full name: Yevgeni Viktorovich Zaytsev
- Date of birth: 18 March 1968 (age 58)
- Place of birth: Voronezh, Russian SFSR
- Height: 1.83 m (6 ft 0 in)
- Positions: Forward; midfielder

Youth career
- DYuSShOR-15 Voronezh

Senior career*
Years	Team	Apps	(Gls)
1990–1991	FC Buran Voronezh	66	(11)
1992–1995	FC Fakel Voronezh	122	(10)
1996–1998	FC Lokomotiv Liski	98	(11)
1999–2001	FC Gazovik Ostrogozhsk		
- * Club domestic league appearances and goals

Yevgeni Viktorovich Zaytsev (Russian: Евгений Викторович Зайцев; born 18 March 1968) is a Russian former football player.
