= Sergey Sergeyev (footballer) =

Russian footballer

Personal information
- Full name: Sergey Anatolyevich Sergeyev
- Date of birth: 14 October 1965 (age 61)
- Place of birth: Nizhny Tagil, Russian SFSR
- Height: 1.87 m (6 ft 1 1/2 in)
- Positions: Defender; striker; midfielder

Senior career*
Years	Team	Apps	(Gls)
1988–1991	FC Rotor Volgograd	89	(8)
1991–1994	FC Tekstilshchik Kamyshin	89	(15)
1995	FC Torpedo Volzhsky	10	(0)
1995	FC Zvezda Gorodishche	1	(0)
1995	FC Vodnik Kalachyov		
1996	FC Metallurg Lipetsk	6	(0)
1997	FC Venets Gulkevichi	12	(2)
1997	FC Slavyansk Slavyansk-na-Kubani	12	(0)
1998	FC Samotlor-XXI Nizhnevartovsk	26	(1)
1999	FC Slavyansk Slavyansk-na-Kubani	0	(0)
- * Club domestic league appearances and goals

Sergey Anatolyevich Sergeyev (Russian: Серге́й Анатольевич Сергеев; born 14 October 1965) is a former Russian professional footballer.

== Club career ==
He made his professional debut in the Soviet First League in 1988 for FC Rotor Volgograd.
