= FC Agtala Moscow =

- Full name: Football Club Agtala Moscow
- Founded: 1992
- Dissolved: 1992
- League: Russian Second Division, Zone 4
- 1992: Excluded after playing 13 games

FC Agtala Moscow (Russian: «Агтала» (Москва)) was a Russian football team from Moscow. It played professionally in 1992 in the Russian Second Division, but was excluded after playing 13 games.
