= Igor Kachmazov (footballer, born 1962) =

Russian footballer and coach

Personal information
- Full name: Igor Aleksandrovich Kachmazov
- Date of birth: 28 February 1962 (age 64)
- Place of birth: Kuybyshev, Russian SFSR
- Height: 1.75 m (5 ft 9 in)
- Positions: Forward; midfielder

Senior career*
| Years | Team | Apps | (Gls) |
| 1980–1983 | FC Spartak Ordzhonikidze | 74 | (1) |
| 1984–1985 | FC Nart Cherkessk | 55 | (16) |
| 1986–1987 | FC Spartak Ordzhonikidze | 76 | (7) |
| 1988 | FC Lokomotiv Mineralnye Vody | 11 | (1) |
| 1988 | FC Dynamo Stavropol | 10 | (0) |
| 1989 | FC Spartak Ordzhonikidze | 33 | (2) |
| 1991 | FC Avtodor Vladikavkaz | 31 | (19) |
| 1991–1992 | FC Spartak Vladikavkaz | 22 | (7) |
| 1993–1994 | FC Avtodor Vladikavkaz | 36 | (18) |
| 1995 | FC Spartak Alagir | 3 | (0) |

Managerial career
- 2006: FC Spartak-2 Vladikavkaz (administrator)
- 2008–2009: FC Alania-2 Vladikavkaz (assistant)
- * Club domestic league appearances and goals

Igor Aleksandrovich Kachmazov (Russian: Игорь Александрович Качмазов; born 28 February 1962) is a Russian professional football coach and a former player.

== Club career ==
He made his professional debut in the Soviet First League in 1980 for FC Spartak Ordzhonikidze.

== Honours ==
- Russian Premier League runner-up: 1992.
