= FC Priazovye Yeysk =

Russian football club

- Full name: Football Club Priazovye Yeysk
- Founded: 1979
- League: Higher League of Krasnodar Krai Championship (D5)
- 2008: 11th (relegated)

FC Priazovye Yeysk (Russian: «Приазовье» (Ейск)) is a Russian football team from Yeysk. It played professionally from 1990 to 1992. Their best result was 13th place in the Zone 2 of the Russian Second Division in 1992. As of 2009, it plays in the First League of Krasnodar Krai Championship (sixth-highest tier).

== Team name history ==
- 1979–1992: FC Start Yeysk
- 2000–present: FC Priazovye Yeysk
