= FC Pele Moscow =

- Full name: Football Club Pele Moscow
- Founded: 1992
- Dissolved: 1993
- League: Russian Second Division, Zone 3
- 1992: 5th

FC Pele Moscow (Russian: «Пеле» (Москва)) was a Russian football team from Moscow. It played professionally in the Russian Second Division in 1992, taking 5th place in Zone 3, and dissolved after that season.
