= Aleksandr Styopin =

Russian footballer

Personal information
- Full name: Aleksandr Valeryevich Styopin
- Date of birth: 7 February 1972 (age 54)
- Place of birth: Bryansk, Russian SFSR
- Height: 1.74 m (5 ft 9 in)
- Positions: Midfielder; forward

Youth career
- FC Dynamo Bryansk

Senior career*
| Years | Team | Apps | (Gls) |
| 1990–1992 | FC Dynamo Bryansk | 49 | (12) |
| 1992–1997 | FC Fakel Voronezh | 174 | (26) |
| 1998 | FC Baltika Kaliningrad | 14 | (0) |
| 1998–2000 | FC Fakel Voronezh | 61 | (6) |
| 2001 | FC Metallurg Krasnoyarsk | 26 | (4) |
| 2002 | FC Dynamo Bryansk | 6 | (1) |
| 2004 | FC Volgar-Gazprom Astrakhan | 9 | (2) |
| 2004 | FC Salyut-Energiya Belgorod | 8 | (3) |
| 2005 | FC Saturn Yegoryevsk | 0 | (0) |
| 2006 | FC Dynamo Bryansk | 5 | (0) |
| 2007 | FC Trud Voronezh | | |

Managerial career
- 2007: FC Trud Voronezh (assistant)
- 2013: FC Fakel Voronezh (scout)
- * Club domestic league appearances and goals

Aleksandr Valeryevich Styopin (Russian: Александр Валерьевич Стёпин; born 7 February 1972) is a former Russian professional football player.

== Club career ==
He made his professional debut in the Soviet Second League in 1990 for FC Dynamo Bryansk. He played 6 games in the UEFA Intertoto Cup 1998 for FC Baltika Kaliningrad.
