= FC Titan Klin =

Russian football club

- Full name: Football Club Titan Klin
- Founded: 1991
- League: Amateur Football League, Moscow Oblast, Group B
- 2009: 4th

FC Titan Klin (Russian: «Титан» (Клин)) is an association football team from Klin, Moscow Oblast, Russia. It played professionally from 1992 to 2005. Their best result was 6th place in the Russian Second Division (Zone 3 in 1992 and Zone Center in 2003). As of 2009, they play in Group B of the Moscow Oblast zone of the Amateur Football League (fifth-highest tier).

== Team name history ==
- 1991–1998: FC Titan Reutov
- 1999: FC Titan Zheleznodorozhny
- 2000–2002: FC Titan Reutov
- 2003–2005: FC Titan Moscow
- 2006–present: FC Titan Klin
