= FC FShM Moscow =

FC FSHM Moscow
- Full name: Football Club Football School of Youth Moscow
- Founded: 1950
- League: Amateur Football League, Zone Moscow
- 1999: 12
Home colours	Away colours

FC FSHM Moscow (Russian: ФШМ (Москва)) is a Russian football team from Moscow. It played professionally from 1979 to 1996. FShM stands for "Football School of Youth" (Futbolnaya Shkhola Molodyozhi) and during Soviet times many junior players from Moscow played on the team to gain their initial professional experience. Their best result was 10th place in Zone 1 of the Soviet Second League in 1986. It plays in the Russian Amateur Football League which have a semi-pro status.

== Team name history ==
- 1950–1984: FShM Moscow
- 1985–1986: SK FShM Moscow
- 1987–1989: SK EShVSM Moscow
- 1990–1991: FC Zvezda Moscow
- 1992–1998: FC TRASKO Moscow
- 1999–present: FC FSHM Moscow
