= FC Presnya Moscow =

Presnya Moscow
- Full name: Football Club Presnya Moscow
- Founded: 1978
- Dissolved: 2006
- Ground: Krasnaya Presnya Stadium
Home colours	Away colours

FC Presnya Moscow (Russian: ФК «Пресня» Москва) was a Russian football team based in Moscow. It was founded in 1978 as FC Krasnaya Presnya Moscow. It participated in the third-tier Soviet Second League and was notable for giving the start for the careers of Oleg Romantsev, Vasili Kulkov and Aleksandr Mostovoi.

== History ==
In 1990, when perestroika policies allowed the creation of private enterprises in the Soviet Union, the club was purchased by an Iraqi businessman Hussam Al-Khalidi who renamed the club to Asmaral (after the initials of his three children – daughters Asil and Mariam and son Alan). It was the first privately owned club in Russia. Al-Khalidi hired an acclaimed coach Konstantin Beskov and a former Spartak Moscow star Yuri Gavrilov. After the 1991 season, the club was promoted to the second-tier Soviet First League. However, due to the dissolution of the USSR, the new Russian league system was organized, and Asmaral was accepted into the top-flight Russian Top Division, where it reached the 7th place in the inaugural 1992 season. In the next 1993 season, it was relegated to the Russian First Division, then suffered two consecutive relegations in 1995 and 1996, ending up in the Russian Third Division. Following the 1998 season, it lost the professional status (entering amateur leagues) and was dissolved altogether after the 1999 season, and being declared bankrupt in September 2003.

Asmaral's farm club participated in the Russian Second League and Russian Third League in 1992 as FC Asmaral-d Moscow and from 1993 to 1995 as FC Presnya Moscow.

A separate club called FC Presnya Moscow participated on the professional level in the Russian Second Division from 2004 to 2006.

=== League and cup ===
Season	League									Russian Cup	Top goalscorer		Managers
Season	Div.	Pos.	Pl.	W	D	L	GS	GA	P	Russian Cup	Name	League	Managers
1992	1st	7th	14	3	3	8	17	36	9	-	(Russia) Kirill Rybakov	13	(Russia) Konstantin Beskov
1993	1st	18th	34	7	6	21	28	53	20	Round of 32			(Russia) Nikolai Khudiyev
1994	2nd	10th	42	17	8	17	57	55	42	Round of 16			(Russia) Valentin Ivanov (Russia) Vladimir Belousov
1995	2nd	22nd	42	8	4	30	35	98	28	Fourth Round			(Russia) Vladimir Mikhaylov
1996	3rd	21st	42	8	4	30	33	92	28	Round of 32			(Russia) Vladimir Mikhaylov
1997	4th	15th	40	14	3	23	50	77	45	-			(Russia) Vladimir Mikhaylov
1998	3rd	21st	40	9	4	27	42	75	31	Second round			(Russia) Vladimir Mikhaylov (Russia) V. V. Medvedev (Russia) Aleksandr Antonov

== Notable players ==
Had international caps for their respective countries. Players whose name is listed in bold represented their countries while playing for Asmaral/Krasnaya Presnya.

USSR/Russia

- (Soviet Union) Yuri Gavrilov
- (Soviet Union) (Commonwealth of Independent States) (Russia) Vasili Kulkov
- (Soviet Union) (Commonwealth of Independent States) (Russia) Aleksandr Mostovoi
- (Soviet Union) Aleksandr Prokhorov
- (Soviet Union) Sergey Rodionov
- (Soviet Union) Andrei Yakubik
- (Russia) Sergey Grishin
- (Russia) Sergei Semak
- (Russia) Aleksandr Tochilin

Former USSR countries

- (Lithuania) Algimantas Briaunis
