= List of PFC CSKA Moscow seasons =

PFC CSKA Moscow is an association football club based in Moscow, that competes in the Russian Premier League, the top football league in Russia. Established in 1911, the club is one of the oldest teams in Russia.

== Key ==
- P = Played
- W = Games won
- D = Games drawn
- L = Games lost
- F = Goals for
- A = Goals against
- Pts = Points
- Pos = Final position
- Top League = 1992-1997
- Top Division = 1998-2001
- Premier League = 2002-Present
- LC = League Cup
- RSC = Russian Super Cup
- CWC = European/UEFA Cup Winners' Cup
- UC = UEFA Cup
- EL = UEFA Europa League
- CL = UEFA Champions League
- USC = UEFA Super Cup
- QR1/2/3 = First/Second/Third Qualifying Round etc.
- PO = Playoff Round
- GS = Group stage
- R32 = Round of 32
- R16 = Round of 16
- QF = Quarter-finals
- SF = Semi-finals
- F = Final
- W = Winners

Champions	Runners-up	Promoted	Play-Offs	Relegated

== League and Cup history ==
=== Soviet Union ===
Season	League									Soviet Cup	Europe		Other		Top scorer		Head coach
Season	Division	Pos	P	W	D	L	F	A	Pts	Soviet Cup	Competition	Result	Competition	Result	Name	Goals	Head coach
1936(s)	1st	4	6	2	1	3	13	18	11	-	-		-		Evgeny Shelagin	3	(Soviet Union) Pavel Khalkiopov
1936(a)	1st	8	7	2	0	5	9	20	11	R32	-		-		Ivan Mitronov; Nikolai Isaev	2	(Soviet Union) Pavel Khalkiopov
1937	1st	9	16	3	1	12	18	43	23	SF	-		-		Mikhail Kireev	5	(Soviet Union) Mikhail Rushchinsky
1938	1st	2	25	17	3	5	52	24	37	R64	-		-		(Soviet Union) Grigory Fedotov	20	(Soviet Union) Konstantin Zhiboedov
1939	1st	3	26	14	4	8	68	43	32	QF	-		-		(Soviet Union) Grigory Fedotov	21	(Soviet Union) Konstantin Zhiboedov
1940	1st	4	24	10	9	5	46	35	29	-	-		-		(Soviet Union) Grigory Fedotov	21	(Soviet Union) Sergei Bukhteev
1941	-	-	-	-	-	-	-	-	-	-	-		-				(Soviet Union) Sergei Bukhteev
1942	-	-	-	-	-	-	-	-	-	-	-		-				
1943	-	-	-	-	-	-	-	-	-	-	-		-				
1944	-	-	-	-	-	-	-	-	-	Runner-Up	-		-				(Soviet Union) Evgeny Nikishin (Soviet Union) Boris Arkadyev
1945	1st	2	22	18	3	1	69	23	39	Winner	-		-		(Soviet Union) Vsevolod Bobrov	24	(Soviet Union) Boris Arkadyev
1946	1st	1	22	17	3	2	55	13	37	QF	-		-		(Soviet Union) Valentin Nikolayev	16	(Soviet Union) Boris Arkadyev
1947	1st	1	24	17	6	1	61	16	40	SF	-		-		(Soviet Union) Valentin Nikolayev (Soviet Union) Vsevolod Bobrov	14	(Soviet Union) Boris Arkadyev
1948	1st	1	26	19	3	4	82	30	41	Winner	-		-		(Soviet Union) Vsevolod Bobrov	23	(Soviet Union) Boris Arkadyev
1949	1st	2	34	22	7	5	86	30	51	SF	-		-		(Soviet Union) Grigory Fedotov	18	(Soviet Union) Boris Arkadyev
1950	1st	1	36	20	13	3	91	31	53	SF	-		-		Boris Koverznev	21	(Soviet Union) Boris Arkadyev
1951	1st	1	28	18	7	3	53	19	43	Winner	-		-		(Soviet Union) Alexei Grinin (Soviet Union) Vyacheslav Solovyov	10	(Soviet Union) Boris Arkadyev
1952	-	-	-	-	-	-	-	-	-	-	-		LC	Winner			(Soviet Union) Boris Arkadyev
1953	-	-	-	-	-	-	-	-	-	-	-		-				
1954	1st	6	24	8	8	8	30	29	24	QF	-		-		Viktor Fyodorov	6	(Soviet Union) Grigory Pinaichev
1955	1st	3	22	12	7	3	35	20	31	Winner	-		-		Valentin Yemyshev; Yuri Belyaev	8	(Soviet Union) Grigory Pinaichev
1956	1st	3	22	10	5	7	40	32	25	-	-		-		Yuri Belyaev	15	(Soviet Union) Grigory Pinaichev
1957	1st	5	22	12	2	8	51	31	27	SF	-		-		(Soviet Union) Vasily Buzunov	16	(Soviet Union) Grigory Pinaichev
1958	1st	3	22	9	9	4	40	25	27	R16	-		-		(Soviet Union) German Apukhtin	10	(Soviet Union) Boris Arkadyev
1959	1st	9	22	8	3	11	29	27	19	-	-		-		(Soviet Union) German Apukhtin	9	(Soviet Union) Boris Arkadyev
1960	1st	6	30	15	2	13	45	35	32	R16	-		-		Vladimir Streshniy	12	(Soviet Union) Grigory Pinaichev
1961	1st	4	30	16	6	8	61	43	38	R64	-		-		(Soviet Union) Alexei Mamykin	18	(Soviet Union) Konstantin Beskov
1962	1st	4	32	14	12	6	39	22	40	R32	-		-		(Soviet Union) Vladimir Fedotov	6	(Soviet Union) Konstantin Beskov
1963	1st	7	38	14	17	7	39	27	45	R32	-		-		(Soviet Union) Vladimir Fedotov	8	(Soviet Union) Vyacheslav Solovyov
1964	1st	3	32	16	11	5	49	23	43	QF	-		-		(Soviet Union) Vladimir Fedotov	16	(Soviet Union) Vyacheslav Solovyov (Soviet Union) Valentin Nikolayev
1965	1st	3	32	14	10	8	38	24	38	R16	-		-		Boris Kazakov	15	(Soviet Union) Valentin Nikolayev
1966	1st	5	36	16	9	11	60	45	41	R32	-		-		Boris Kazakov	15	(Soviet Union) Sergei Shaposhnikov
1967	1st	9	36	12	12	12	35	35	36	Runner-Up	-		-		Taras Shulyatitsky	6	(Soviet Union) Sergei Shaposhnikov (Soviet Union) Alexei Kalinin (Soviet Union) Vsevolod Bobrov
1968	1st	4	38	20	10	8	50	30	50	R16	-		-		(Soviet Union) Vladimir Polikarpov	10	(Soviet Union) Vsevolod Bobrov
1969	1st	6	32	13	11	8	25	18	37	SF	-		-		Berador Abduraimov	7	(Soviet Union) Vsevolod Bobrov
1970	1st	1	32	20	5	7	46	17	45	R16	-		-		(Soviet Union) Boris Kopeikin	15	(Soviet Union) Valentin Nikolayev
1971	1st	12	30	7	12	11	34	36	26	R16	EC	R2	-		(Soviet Union) Boris Kopeikin	8	(Soviet Union) Valentin Nikolayev
1972	1st	5	30	15	4	11	37	33	34	SF	-		-		(Soviet Union) Vladimir Polikarpov; Vladimir Dorofeev; Wilhelm Tellinger	6	(Soviet Union) Valentin Nikolayev
1973	1st	10	30	10	9	11	33	36	25	QF	-		-		Vladimir Dorofeev	9	(Soviet Union) Valentin Nikolayev
1974	1st	13	30	7	12	11	28	33	26	R16	-		-		(Soviet Union) Vladimir Fedotov; Yuri Smirnov	5	(Soviet Union) Vladimir Agapov
1975	1st	13	30	6	13	11	29	36	25	SF	-		-		(Soviet Union) Boris Kopeikin	13	(Soviet Union) Anatoly Tarasov
1976(s)	1st	7	15	5	5	5	20	16	15	-	-		-		(Soviet Union) Boris Kopeikin	6	(Soviet Union) Alexei Mamykin
1976(a)	1st	7	15	5	5	5	21	16	15	QF	-		-		(Soviet Union) Boris Kopeikin	8	(Soviet Union) Alexei Mamykin
1977	1st	14	30	5	17	8	28	39	27	R16	-		-		(Soviet Union) Yuri Chesnokov	12	(Soviet Union) Alexei Mamykin (Soviet Union) Vsevolod Bobrov
1978	1st	6	30	14	4	12	36	40	32	R16	-		-		Aleksei Belenkov	8	(Soviet Union) Vsevolod Bobrov
1979	1st	8	34	12	8	14	46	46	32	SF	-		-		(Soviet Union) Yuri Chesnokov	16	(Soviet Union) Sergei Shaposhnikov
1980	1st	5	34	13	12	9	36	32	36	R16	-		-		(Soviet Union) Alexandr Tarkhanov	14	(Soviet Union) Oleg Bazilevich
1981	1st	6	34	14	9	11	39	33	37	R16	UC	R1	-		(Soviet Union) Yuri Chesnokov	9	(Soviet Union) Oleg Bazilevich
1982	1st	15	34	10	9	15	41	46	29	Qualifying	-		-		(Soviet Union) Alexandr Tarkhanov	16	(Soviet Union) Oleg Bazilevich (Soviet Union) Albert Shesternev
1983	1st	12	34	11	12	11	37	33	32	SF	-		-		Viktor Kolyadko	13	(Soviet Union) Albert Shesternev
1984	1st	18	34	5	9	20	24	55	19	QF	-		-		Gennady Shtromberger	4	(Soviet Union) Yury Morozov
1985	2nd	2	42	21	14	7	81	37	56	QF	-		-		(Soviet Union) Valeri Shmarov	29	(Soviet Union) Yury Morozov
1986	2nd	1	47	27	9	11	65	35	63	R32	-		-		Sergei Berezin	19	(Soviet Union) Yury Morozov
1987	1st	15	30	7	11	12	26	35	24	Winner	-		-		(Soviet Union) Vladimir Tatarchuk		(Soviet Union) Yury Morozov
1988	2nd	3	42	23	10	9	69	35	56	Winner	-		-		(Soviet Union) Valery Masalitin	16	(Soviet Union) Sergei Shaposhnikov
1989	2nd	1	42	27	10	5	113	28	64	R128	-		-		(Soviet Union) Valery Masalitin	32	(Soviet Union) Pavel Sadyrin
1990	1st	2	24	13	5	6	43	26	31	SF	-		-		(Soviet Union) Valery Masalitin / (Soviet Union) Igor Korneev	8	(Soviet Union) Pavel Sadyrin
1991	1st	1	30	17	9	4	57	32	43	Winner	CWC	R1	-		(Soviet Union) Dmitri Kuznetsov	12	(Soviet Union) Pavel Sadyrin
1992	-	-	-	-	-	-	-	-	-	Runner-Up	-		-				(Soviet Union) Pavel Sadyrin

=== Russia ===
Season	League									Russian Cup	Europe		Other		Top scorer		Head coach
Season	Division	Pos	P	W	D	L	F	A	Pts	Russian Cup	Competition	Result	Competition	Result	Name	Goals	Head coach
1992	Top League	5	26	13	7	6	46	29	33	Runner-Up	CL	GS	-		(Russia) Alexandr Grishin	10	(Russia) Pavel Sadyrin (Russia) Gennadi Kostylev
1993	Top League	9	34	12	6	16	43	45	42	Runner-Up	-		-		(Russia) Ilshat Fayzulin (Russia) Oleg Sergeyev	8	(Russia) Gennadi Kostylev (Russia) Boris Kopeikin
1994	Top League	10	30	8	10	12	30	32	26	Round of 16	CWC	1R	-		(Russia) Ilshat Fayzulin (Russia) Oleg Sergeyev	5	(Russia) Boris Kopeikin (Russia) Alexandr Tarkhanov
1995	Top League	6	30	16	5	9	56	34	53	Quarter-finals	-		-		(Russia) Dmitry Karsakov	10	(Russia) Alexandr Tarkhanov
1996	Top League	5	34	20	6	8	58	35	66	Round of 16	UC	1R	-		(Russia) Dmitry Khokhlov (Russia) Aleksei Gerasimov	10	(Russia) Alexandr Tarkhanov
1997	Top League	12	34	11	9	14	31	42	42	Quarter-finals	-		-		(Russia) Vladimir Kulik	9	(Russia) Pavel Sadyrin
1998	Top Division	2	30	17	5	8	50	22	56	Semi-finals	-		-		(Russia) Vladimir Kulik	14	(Russia) Pavel Sadyrin (Russia) Oleg Dolmatov
1999	Top Division	3	30	15	10	5	56	29	55	Runner-Up	CL	2QR	-		(Russia) Vladimir Kulik	14	(Russia) Oleg Dolmatov
2000	Top Division	8	30	12	5	13	45	39	41	Round of 16	UC	1R	-		(Russia) Vladimir Kulik	10	(Russia) Oleg Dolmatov (Russia) Pavel Sadyrin
2001	Top Division	7	30	12	11	7	39	30	47	Winner	-		-		(Serbia) Predrag Ranđelović	8	(Russia) Pavel Sadyrin (Russia) Aleksandr Kuznetsov
2002	Premier League	2	30	21	3	6	60	27	66	Round of 32	UC	1R	-		(Russia) Rolan Gusev (Russia) Dmitry Kirichenko	15	(Russia) Valery Gazzaev
2003	Premier League	1	30	17	8	5	56	32	59	Quarter-finals	CL	2QR	RSC	Runner-Up	(Russia) Rolan Gusev	9	(Russia) Valery Gazzaev
2004	Premier League	2	30	17	9	4	53	22	60	Winner	CL	GS	RSC	Winner	(Croatia) Ivica Olić (Brazil) Vágner Love (Russia) Dmitry Kirichenko	9	(Portugal) Artur Jorge (Russia) Valery Gazzaev
2005	Premier League	1	30	18	8	4	48	20	62	Winner	UC; UC	Winner GS	USC	Runner-up	(Croatia) Ivica Olić	10	(Russia) Valery Gazzaev
2006	Premier League	1	30	17	7	6	47	28	58	Round of 16	CL	GS	RSC	Winner	(Brazil) Jô	14	(Russia) Valery Gazzaev
2007	Premier League	3	30	14	11	5	43	24	53	Winner	UC; CL	R32; GS	RSC	Winner	(Brazil) Jô (Brazil) Vágner Love	13	(Russia) Valery Gazzaev
2008	Premier League	2	30	16	8	6	53	24	56	Winner	UC	R16	-		(Brazil) Vágner Love	20	(Russia) Valery Gazzaev
2009	Premier League	5	30	16	4	10	48	30	52	Round of 32	CL	QF	RSC	Winner	(Serbia) Miloš Krasić (Czech Republic) Tomáš Necid	9	(Brazil) Zico (Spain) Juande Ramos (Russia) Leonid Slutsky
2010	Premier League	2	30	18	8	4	51	22	59	Winner	EL	R16	RSC	Runner-up	(Brazil) Vágner Love	9	(Russia) Leonid Slutsky
2011–12	Premier League	3	44	19	9	16	72	47	73	Round of 32	CL	R16	RSC	Runner-up	(Ivory Coast) Seydou Doumbia	28	(Russia) Leonid Slutsky
2012–13	Premier League	1	30	20	4	6	49	25	64	Winner	EL	PO	-		(Nigeria) Ahmed Musa	11	(Russia) Leonid Slutsky
2013–14	Premier League	1	30	20	4	6	49	26	64	Semi-finals	CL	GS	RSC	Winner	(Ivory Coast) Seydou Doumbia	18	(Russia) Leonid Slutsky
2014–15	Premier League	2	30	19	3	8	67	27	60	Semi-finals	CL	GS	RSC	Winner	(Finland) Roman Eremenko	13	(Russia) Leonid Slutsky
2015–16	Premier League	1	30	20	5	5	51	25	65	Runner-Up	CL	GS	-		(Nigeria) Ahmed Musa	13	(Russia) Leonid Slutsky
2016–17	Premier League	2	30	18	8	4	47	15	62	Round of 32	CL	GS	RSC	Runner-up	(Russia) Fyodor Chalov (Israel) Bibras Natcho (Brazil) Vitinho	6	(Russia) Leonid Slutsky (Belarus) Viktor Goncharenko
2017–18	Premier League	2	30	17	7	6	49	23	58	Round of 32	CL; EL	GS; QF	-		(Brazil) Vitinho	10	(Belarus) Viktor Goncharenko
2018–19	Premier League	4	30	14	9	7	46	23	51	Round of 32	CL	GS	RSC	Winner	(Russia) Fyodor Chalov	15	(Belarus) Viktor Goncharenko
2019–20	Premier League	4	30	14	8	8	43	29	50	Quarter-finals	EL	GS	-		(Croatia) Nikola Vlašić	12	(Belarus) Viktor Goncharenko
2020–21	Premier League	6	30	15	5	10	51	33	50	Semi-finals	EL	GS	-		(Croatia) Nikola Vlašić	11	(Belarus) Viktor Goncharenko (Croatia) Ivica Olić
2021–22	Premier League	5	30	15	5	10	42	29	50	Quarter-finals	-	-	-		(Turkey) Yusuf Yazıcı	8	(Russia) Aleksei Berezutski
2022–23	Premier League	2	30	17	7	6	57	26	58	Winner	Suspended		-		(Russia) Fyodor Chalov	19	(Russia) Vladimir Fedotov
2023–24	Premier League	6	30	12	12	6	56	40	48	Semi-finals	Suspended		RSC	Runner-up	(Russia) Fyodor Chalov	12	(Russia) Vladimir Fedotov
2024–25	Premier League	3	30	17	8	5	49	21	59	Winner	Suspended		-	-	(Russia) Ivan Oblyakov (Russia) Tamerlan Musayev	7	(Serbia) Marko Nikolić
2025–26	Premier League										Suspended		RSC	Winner			(Switzerland) Fabio Celestini
