= Yevgeni Khrabrostin =

Yevgeni Khrabrostin may refer to:

- Yevgeni Khrabrostin (footballer, born 1951), Soviet Russian football player
- Yevgeni Khrabrostin (footballer, born 1974), Russian football player
