= Lasha (given name) =

Lasha (Georgian: ლაშა) is a masculine Georgian given name. It may refer to the following notable people:

- George IV of Georgia (born Lasha Giorgi, 1191–1223), king of Georgia
- Lasha Bekauri (born 2000), Georgian judoka
- Lasha Bugadze (born 1977), Georgian novelist and playwright
- Lasha Darbaidze (born 1969), Honorary Consul of Georgia in the United States
- Lasha Dekanosidze (born 1987), Georgian football player
- Lasha Dvali (born 1995), Georgian football plater
- Lasha Gobadze (born 1994), Georgian wrestler
- Lasha Gogitadze (born 1987), Georgian Greco-Roman wrestler
- Lasha Gujejiani (born 1985), Georgian judoka
- Lasha Gulelauri (born 1993), Georgian triple jumper
- Lasha Imedashvili (born 1996), Russian football player
- Lasha Jaiani, Georgian rugby union player
- Lasha Jakobia (born 1980), Georgian football player
- Lasha Janjgava (born 1970), Georgian chess grandmaster
- Lasha Kasradze (born 1989), Georgian football defender
- Lasha Khmaladze (born 1988), Georgian rugby union player
- Lasha Khutsishvili (born 1985), Georgian politician
- Lasha Lomidze (rugby union, born 1992) (born 1992), Georgian rugby union player
- Lasha Lomidze (rugby union, born 2000) (born 2000), Georgian rugby union player
- Lasha Malaghuradze (born 1986), Georgian rugby union player
- Lasha Macharashvili (born 1998), Georgian rugby union player
- Lasha Monaselidze (born 1977), Georgian football player
- Lasha Nozadze (born 1980), Georgian football player
- Lasha Parunashvili (born 1993), Georgian football midfielder
- Lasha Pipia (1975–2021), Russian judoka
- Lasha Salukvadze (born 1981), Georgian football player
- Lasha Shavdatuashvili (born 1992), Georgian judoka
- Lasha Shergelashvili (born 1992), Georgian football player
- Lasha Shindagoridze (born 1993), Georgian football player
- Lasha Tabidze (born 1997), Georgian rugby union player
- Lasha Talakhadze (born 1993), Georgian weightlifter
- Lasha Totadze (born 1988), Georgian football player
- Lasha Zhvania (born 1973), Georgian politician, diplomat and businessman
