= Aleksandr Pogorelov =

Aleksandr Pogorelov may refer to:

- Aleksandr Pogorelov (athlete), Russian decathlete
- Alexander Pogorelov (gymnast), Soviet/Russian gymnast
- Oleksandr Pogoryelov, Soviet and Ukrainian professional football player and coach.
