= Aleksandr Markin =

Aleksandr Markin may refer to:

- Aleksandr Markin (footballer) (1949–1996), Soviet Russian footballer
- Aleksandr Markin (hurdler) (born 1962), Soviet Russian track and field athlete
