= INGRAD =

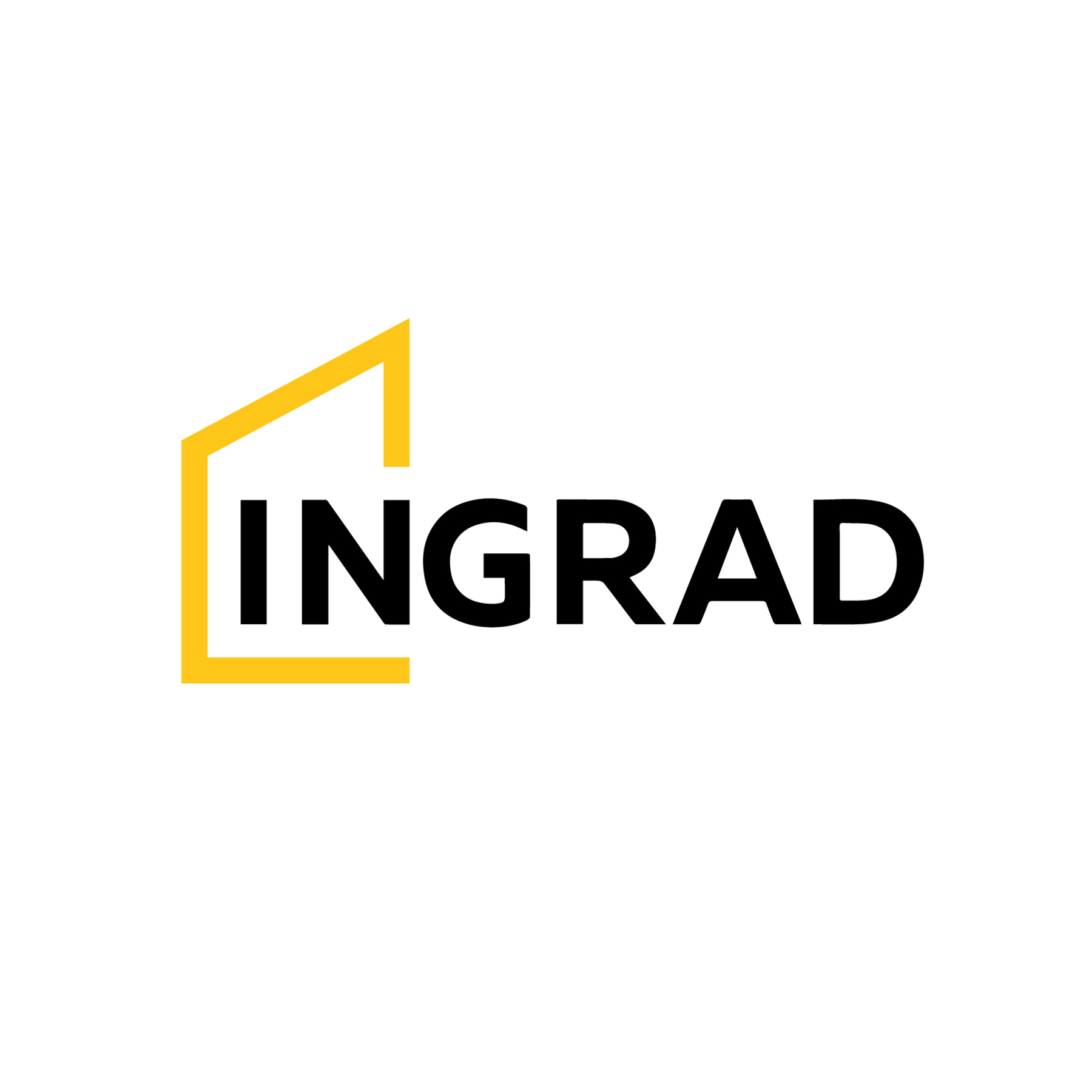
- Native name: ИНГРАД
- Company type: Public (MCX: INGR)
- Industry: Real estate
- Founded: 2012; 14 years ago
- Headquarters: Moscow, Russia
- Key people: Roman Avdeev (chairman); Serguey Kachura (CEO)
- Products: Investment grade, Real estate
- Revenue: ▲ ₽ 53 Billion (2018)
- Number of employees: 1,500 (2021)
- Website: ingrad.ru

PJSC INGRAD (Russian: ПAO Инград, romanized: PAO Ingrad) is the investment and development holding company. The company's headquarters is located in Moscow.

The main activity is the development of residential and commercial real estate in Moscow and the Moscow region. The company specializes in the construction of residential quarters of comfort and business class.

Since 2018, Ingrad Group has been the title sponsor of Moscow Torpedo football club. Also, in 2018, Ingrad Group and Torpedo-Moscow Rugby Club signed a partnership agreement.

== Owners and management ==
The majority shareholder of the company is Rossium Concern. Ingrad Group shares are listed on the MICEX Stock Exchange.

Chairman of the Board of Directors of the company — Roman Avdeev.

CEO of Ingrad Group — Sergey Kachura.

== History ==
The company was established in 2012. In 2017, Concern Rossium LLC announced the merger of the development companies of PJSC Opin and JSC Ingrad into a single company PJSC Ingrad. The authorized capital of the combined company amounted to 41,2 billion rubles.

In 2019, according to the Forbes rating, the company for the first time led the 5 fastest-growing private business enterprises.

In 2021, the company was appropriated a BBB+ credit rating from the Analytical Credit Rating Agency ACRA based on "high estimates of profitability, liquidity and cash flow", NKR Agency assigned a credit rating A-.ru with a stable outlook.

According to the Unified Resource of Developers, as of July 2021, the company ranks 8th in the ranking of the largest developers of the Russian Federation in terms of current construction and 6th in the Moscow region.
