= Sergei Petrenko (footballer) =

Russian footballer (born 1955)

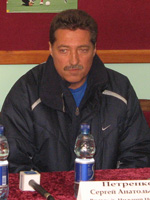

Personal information
- Full name: Sergei Anatolyevich Petrenko
- Date of birth: 7 July 1955 (age 71)
- Place of birth: Moscow, Russian SFSR
- Height: 1.76 m (5 ft 9 in)
- Position: Midfielder

Senior career*
Years	Team	Apps	(Gls)
1972–1985	FC Torpedo Moscow	276	(23)

Managerial career
- 1985–1989: SC EShVSM Moscow (assistant)
- 1990: FC Zvezda Moscow
- 1991: FC Zvezda Moscow (assistant)
- 1992–1995: FC Torpedo Moscow (assistant)
- 1994: FC Torpedo Moscow (caretaker)
- 1992–1996: FC Torpedo-d
- 1997–1998: FC Torpedo-ZIL Moscow
- 1998–2002: FC Torpedo-2
- 2002–2006: FC Torpedo Moscow
- 2006–2007: FK Daugava Daugavpils
- 2007–2009: FC Volga Nizhny Novgorod
- 2011: FC Tobol
- 2013–2014: FC Yenisey Krasnoyarsk
- 2022: FC Veles Moscow
- * Club domestic league appearances and goals

Sergei Anatolyevich Petrenko (Russian: Серге́й Анатольевич Петренко; born 7 July 1955) is a Russian professional football coach and a former player.

== Club career ==
As a player, he made his debut in the Soviet Top League in 1972 for FC Torpedo Moscow.

International Master of Sports (from 1976). Graduate of Moscow FShM (from 1965 to 1972). Student of the Higher Technical School (from 1972 to 1975). Trainer and lecturer at the Moscow State Institute of Physical Regional (1985). Has coaching license «PRO» (23 December 2005). Keen tennis player, knows French.

Family :

- His wife - Elena;
- Children - Anton (1993) and Andrew (2001);
- Parents - Anatoly Vasilyevich (chief engineer) and Tamara Ignatyevna (process engineer).

== Speeches ==
- In the big leagues Soviet Top League played for FC Torpedo Moscow, has 276 matches (one of the champions of the club), scored 23 goals.

== Achievements ==
- Champion of the USSR in 1976 (autumn)
- Bronze medalist USSR Championship in 1977.
- Finalist USSR Cup 1977 and 1982.
- Champion European Youth Championship 1976 as well.
- Awarded the prize "best newcomer" in 1975.
- In European competition had 13 games, 1 goal.

== Coaching career ==
- Coach: FSM SK "Luzhniki" (from 1985)
- In 1986-1987 worked as a trainer of the Office of the Sports Committee of the USSR football.
- Coach UK SHVSM "Stars" (1988–1989, 1991)
- Head coach of UK SHVSM "Stars" (1990)
- Coach FC Torpedo Moscow (1992–1995)
- Head coach FC Torpedo Moscow (27 July - 1 September 1994 (caretaker, 3 matches), July 2002 (ai, 1 match), 18 July 2002 - September 2006).
- Head coach of FC Torpedo Moscow (reserves) (1994 1996 September 1998 - July 2002).
- Head coach of FC Torpedo-ZIL Moscow (1997 - September 1998)
- Head coach of FK Daugava Daugavpils) (December 2006 - May 2007).
- Head coach of FC Volga Nizhny Novgorod) (December 2007 - 5 June 2009).

The highest achievement as head coach of the Russian Premier League club: 4th place (2002, FC Torpedo Moscow).
