= Dekanosidze =

Dekanosidze (Georgian: დეკანოსიძე) is a Georgian surname. Notable people with the surname include:

- Lasha Dekanosidze (born 1987), Georgian football player
- Giorgi Dekanosidze (born 1981), Georgian football player
