= 1976 Soviet Top League =

39th season of top-tier football league in Soviet Union

Soviet Top League
- Season: 1976 (spring–autumn)
- European Cup: Torpedo Moscow
- Cup Winners' Cup: Dinamo Moscow
- UEFA Cup: Dinamo Tbilisi; Dinamo Kiev

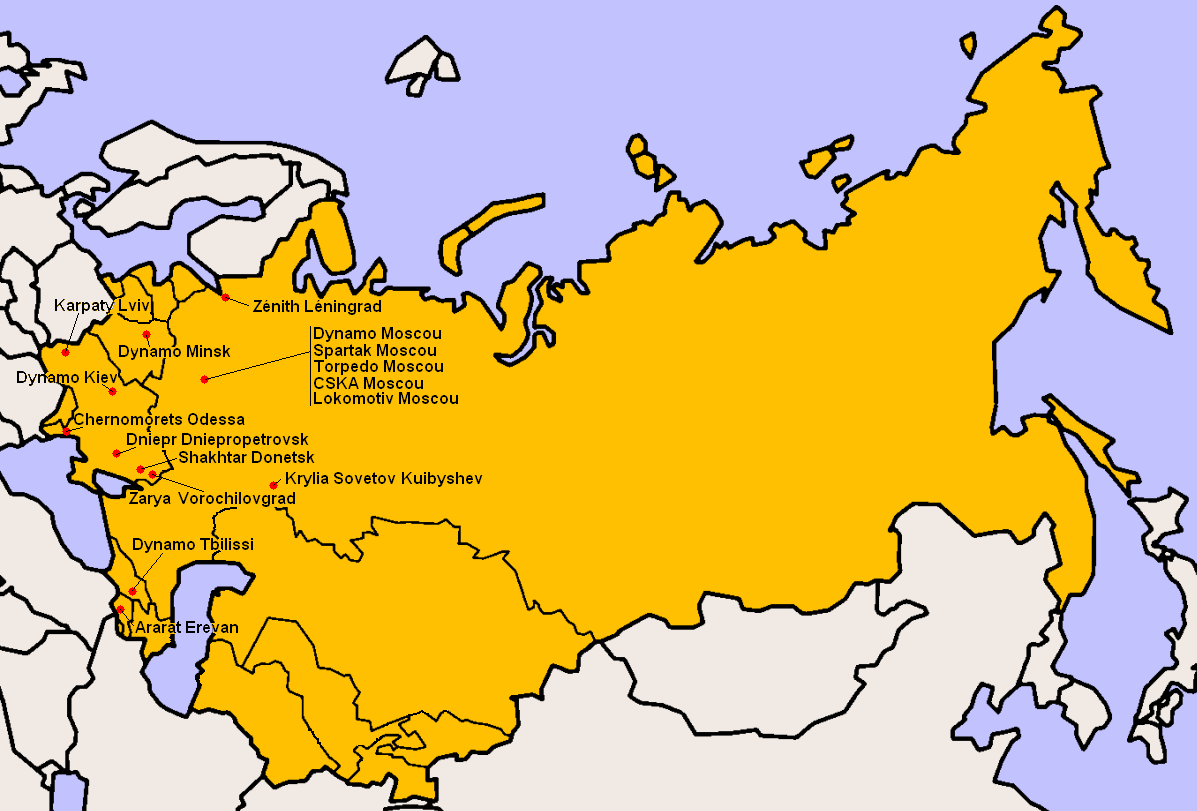

The 1976 Soviet Top League was the 38th and 39th season of the first tier football competitions in the Soviet Union.

By the end of the previous season, it was decided to shift to fall-spring calendar competition, but later in January the decision was reversed. However, it was decided to split competitions in the top tier in spring half and autumn half. According to the season's regulations, the split season championship was carried with consideration to the interest of the national team which was preparing for the 21st Olympic Games (1976 Summer Olympics) and the Europe Championship (UEFA Euro 1976).

Qualification for the European competitions and league relegation was based only on the autumn half portion (39th season). Qualification for the 1976–77 UEFA Cup was reserved for the 1976 spring Champion. This reservation was canceled after Dinamo Moscow, which already qualified for the European competition, won the title.

== Spring ==
1976 spring
- Champions: Dinamo Moscow
- Top goalscorer: (8) Arkady Andreasyan (Ararat)

=== Overview ===
It was contested by 16 teams, and Dynamo Moscow won the championship.

=== League standings ===
Pos	Team	Pld	W	D	L	GF	GA	GD	Pts
1	(Russian Soviet Federative Socialist Republic) Dynamo Moscow (C)	15	9	4	2	17	8	+9	22
2	(Armenian Soviet Socialist Republic) Ararat Yerevan	15	8	3	4	22	13	+9	19
3	(Georgian Soviet Socialist Republic) Dinamo Tbilisi	15	7	4	4	18	10	+8	18
4	(Ukrainian Soviet Socialist Republic) Karpaty Lviv	15	7	4	4	25	19	+6	18
5	(Ukrainian Soviet Socialist Republic) Shakhtar Donetsk	15	7	4	4	15	16	−1	18
6	(Russian Soviet Federative Socialist Republic) Krylya Sovetov Kuibyshev	15	6	5	4	18	15	+3	17
7	(Russian Soviet Federative Socialist Republic) CSKA Moscow	15	5	5	5	20	16	+4	15
8	(Ukrainian Soviet Socialist Republic) Dynamo Kyiv	15	5	5	5	14	12	+2	15
9	(Byelorussian Soviet Socialist Republic) Dinamo Minsk	15	6	3	6	17	18	−1	15
10	(Ukrainian Soviet Socialist Republic) Chornomorets Odessa	15	4	7	4	14	18	−4	15
11	(Ukrainian Soviet Socialist Republic) Dnipro Dnipropetrovsk	15	6	2	7	18	18	0	14
12	(Russian Soviet Federative Socialist Republic) Torpedo Moscow	15	5	4	6	15	20	−5	14
13	(Russian Soviet Federative Socialist Republic) Zenit Leningrad	15	4	5	6	14	15	−1	13
14	(Russian Soviet Federative Socialist Republic) Spartak Moscow	15	4	2	9	10	18	−8	10
15	(Russian Soviet Federative Socialist Republic) Lokomotiv Moscow	15	3	3	9	17	23	−6	9
16	(Ukrainian Soviet Socialist Republic) Zaria Voroshilovgrad	15	2	4	9	9	24	−15	8

Rules for classification: 1) Total points (If two or more teams have equal points for the first place, the winner is determined by additional match (matches) on condition and place determined by the Soviet Union Sports Committee); 2) Total goal difference; 3) Head-to-head goal ratio; 4) Total goals scored in away matches
(C) Champions

=== Results ===
Home \ Away	ARA	CHO	CSK	DNI	DYK	DMN	DYN	DTB	KAR	KRY	LOK	SHA	SPA	TOR	ZAR	ZEN
Ararat Yerevan		4–0	0–0		1–2			1–1			3–2	2–0	0–1	2–0		
Chornomorets Odessa				2–1	1–1			0–1		1–1	2–0			1–0		0–0
CSKA Moscow		1–1			1–0	2–0			1–1	1–1	3–2		1–2		3–0	
Dnipro Dnipropetrovsk	2–3		2–0			2–0	1–0		1–2			0–0			2–0	1–0
Dynamo Kyiv				2–0		0–0	0–1	-:+ (Note: The match between Dynamo Kiev and Dinamo Tbilisi resulted in a goalless victory for Tbilisi. The team from Kiev fielded an ineligible player.)	3–1	1–2	0–0				2–1	
Dinamo Minsk	0–1	2–1						2–1	4–2	2–0	1–1		2–1	2–0		
Dynamo Moscow	1–0	0–0	2–1			1–0		2–1				4–1	1–0			
Dinamo Tbilisi			1–1	4–1					3–0	1–0			1–0	1–1	3–0	
Karpaty Lviv	2–1	2–2					1–1			2–0		4–0	2–0	1–2	3–0	
Krylya Sovetov Kuibyshev	1–1			1–0			1–0				3–0	2–2		0–0	4–2	2–1
Lokomotiv Moscow				2–0			2–3	0–0	0–1			1–2		2–3		2–1
Shakhtar Donetsk		1–2	2–0		0–0	0–0		1–0					1–0			1–0
Spartak Moscow		4–1		1–4	0–1					1–0	0–3			0–1	0–0	
Torpedo Moscow			0–4	1–1	3–1		0–0					1–2			2–1	1–2
Zaria Voroshilovgrad	0–1	0–0				3–1	0–0				1–0	0–2				1–1
Zenit Leningrad	1–2		2–1		1–1	3–1	0–1	1–0	1–1				0–0			

Source: Таблица результатов (Results table)
Legend: Blue = home team win; Yellow = draw; Red = away team win.

=== Top scorers ===
8 goals

- Arkady Andreasyan (Ararat)

7 goals

- Nikolai Kazaryan (Ararat)

6 goals

- Ravil Aryapov (Krylya Sovetov)
- Vladimir Danilyuk (Karpaty)
- David Kipiani (Dinamo Tbilisi)
- Boris Kopeikin (CSKA Moscow)
- Anatoliy Shepel (Dynamo Moscow)

5 goals

- Lev Brovarsky (Karpaty)
- Anatoli Degterev (Torpedo Moscow)
- Sergei Grishin (Torpedo Moscow)
- Sergei Malko (Dnipro)
- Aleksandr Markin (Zenit)
- Yuri Smirnov (Krylya Sovetov)
- Pyotr Vasilevsky (Dinamo Minsk)

== Autumn ==
1976 autumn
- Champions: Torpedo Moscow
- Relegated: Spartak Moscow, Dinamo Minsk
- Matches: 120
- Goals: 252 (2.1 per match)
- Top goalscorer: (13) Aleksandr Markin (Zenit)

=== Overview ===
It was performed in 16 teams, and Torpedo Moscow won the championship.

=== League standings ===
Pos	Team	Pld	W	D	L	GF	GA	GD	Pts	Qualification or relegation
1	(Russian Soviet Federative Socialist Republic) Torpedo Moscow (C)	15	9	2	4	20	9	+11	20	Qualification for European Cup first round
2	(Ukrainian Soviet Socialist Republic) Dynamo Kyiv	15	6	6	3	22	16	+6	18	Qualification for UEFA Cup first round
3	(Georgian Soviet Socialist Republic) Dinamo Tbilisi	15	6	5	4	16	12	+4	17	Qualification for UEFA Cup first round
4	(Ukrainian Soviet Socialist Republic) Karpaty Lviv	15	6	5	4	22	19	+3	17	
5	(Russian Soviet Federative Socialist Republic) Zenit Leningrad	15	6	4	5	22	16	+6	16	
6	(Russian Soviet Federative Socialist Republic) Dynamo Moscow	15	7	2	6	15	13	+2	16	Qualification for Cup Winners' Cup first round
7	(Russian Soviet Federative Socialist Republic) CSKA Moscow	15	5	5	5	21	16	+5	15	
8	(Russian Soviet Federative Socialist Republic) Lokomotiv Moscow	15	6	3	6	13	13	0	15	
9	(Ukrainian Soviet Socialist Republic) Chornomorets Odessa	15	7	1	7	14	20	−6	15	
10	(Ukrainian Soviet Socialist Republic) Shakhtar Donetsk	15	5	4	6	12	10	+2	14	
11	(Russian Soviet Federative Socialist Republic) Krylya Sovetov Kuibyshev	15	5	4	6	12	15	−3	14	
12	(Ukrainian Soviet Socialist Republic) Zaria Voroshilovgrad	15	6	2	7	12	17	−5	14 (Note: Head-to-head goals ratio: Zaria advantage.)	
13	(Ukrainian Soviet Socialist Republic) Dnipro Dnipropetrovsk	15	6	2	7	12	17	−5	14	
14	(Armenian Soviet Socialist Republic) Ararat Yerevan	15	4	6	5	14	20	−6	14	
15	(Russian Soviet Federative Socialist Republic) Spartak Moscow (R)	15	5	3	7	15	18	−3	13	Relegation to First League
16	(Byelorussian Soviet Socialist Republic) Dinamo Minsk (R)	15	2	4	9	10	21	−11	8	Relegation to First League

Rules for classification: 1) Total points (If two or more teams have equal points for the first place, the winner is determined by additional match (matches) on condition and place determined by the Soviet Union Sports Committee); 2) Total goal difference; 3) Head-to-head goal ratio; 4) Total goals scored in away matches
(C) Champions; (R) Relegated

=== Results ===
Home \ Away	ARA	CHO	CSK	DNI	DYK	DMN	DYN	DTB	KAR	KRY	LOK	SHA	SPA	TOR	ZAR	ZEN
Ararat Yerevan		2–0	1–1						2–2	0–0		1–0	2–3	1–0		
Chornomorets Odessa						2–0	2–1	2–1	0–1		1–1	2–0				2–1
CSKA Moscow		4–0					2–1	0–0	1–1	5–1		1–0	1–2	0–2		
Dnipro Dnipropetrovsk	0–0	1–2	1–0						1–0	3–1		0–3	1–0	1–0		
Dynamo Kyiv	3–2	1–0	1–1	1–3						2–0			3–1	3–2		
Dinamo Minsk	1–2		2–1	2–0	0–3					0–0	0–1			0–1	1–2	
Dynamo Moscow	0–0			3–0	1–0	2–0					1–0				1–0	2–1
Dinamo Tbilisi	1–1			1–0	0–0	2–0	3–1				0–0				3–0	1–0
Karpaty Lviv					2–2	2–2	2–0	3–1			4–1				3–1	0–3
Krylya Sovetov Kuibyshev		2–0					1–0	1–2	3–1			0–0	1–0			2–0
Lokomotiv Moscow	3–0		1–0	2–0	2–1					0–0			1–3	0–1	1–0	
Shakhtar Donetsk					0–0	2–1	0–1	3–1	0–0		1–0				0–0	3–1
Spartak Moscow		0–1				1–1	1–0	0–0	0–1			1–0				1–2
Torpedo Moscow		4–0					1–1	1–0	2–0	1–0		1–0	2–2			
Zaria Voroshilovgrad	1–0	1–0	0–1	2–1	1–1					1–0			2–0	0–2		
Zenit Leningrad	5–0		3–3	0–0	1–1	0–0					1–0			1–0	3–1	

Source: Таблица результатов (Results table)
Legend: Blue = home team win; Yellow = draw; Red = away team win.

=== Top scorers ===
13 goals

- Aleksandr Markin (Zenit)

8 goals

- Vladimir Danilyuk (Karpaty)
- Boris Kopeikin (CSKA Moscow)

6 goals

- Mikhail Bulgakov (Spartak Moscow)

5 goals

- Oleg Blokhin (Dynamo Kyiv)
- Fyodor Chorba (Karpaty)
- Yevgeni Khrabrostin (Torpedo Moscow)
- Nazar Petrosyan (Ararat)
- Aleksandr Pogorelov (Chornomorets)
- Vladimir Sakharov (Torpedo Moscow)
- Pyotr Yakovlev (Dnipro)
- Andrei Yakubik (Dynamo Moscow)

== Status of Spartak Moscow ==
After Spartak's relegation, there were some figures in the Soviet government who believed the team should be allowed to stay in the first division due to its size and history, but this idea was opposed by Leonid Brezhnev, himself a Spartak supporter, and was ultimately discarded.

== Attendances ==
No.	Club	Average
1	Dinamo Tbilisi	29,867
2	Karpaty	28,467
3	Dinamo Minsk	28,438
4	Ararat	26,193
5	Shakhtar	22,067
6	Dynamo Kyiv	21,107
7	Krylia Sovetov	19,800
8	Zenit	15,781
9	Dynamo Moscow	15,529
10	Chornomorets	15,357
11	Zorya	14,800
12	Dnipro	14,313
13	Spartak Moscow	13,629
14	PFC CSKA	12,694
15	Torpedo Moscow	11,550
16	Lokomotiv Moscow	7,007
