= Novogireyevo =

Novogireyevo may refer to:

- Novogireyevo District, a district in Eastern Administrative Okrug of the federal city of Moscow, Russia
- Novogireyevo (Moscow Metro), a line of the Moscow Metro, Moscow, Russia
- FC Novogiryevo Moscow, a defunct association football club in Russia for which Sergey Bukhteyev played in 1910–1914
