= Skomorokhov =

Skomorokhov (Russian: Скоморохов, from скоморох meaning skomorokh, jester) is a Russian masculine surname, its feminine counterpart is Skomorokhova. It may refer to

- Vyacheslav Skomorokhov (1940–1994), Ukrainian hurdler
- Yevgeni Skomorokhov (1945–2002), Russian football coach and player
