= Alexander Markin =

Alexander Markin may refer to:

- Aleksandr Markin (footballer) (1949–1996), Soviet Russian football player
- Aleksandr Markin (hurdler) (born 1962), Soviet hurdler
