= Georgi Zharkov =

Soviet footballer

Personal information
- Full name: Georgi Ivanovich Zharkov
- Date of birth: 19 August 1915
- Place of birth: Bogorodsk, Moscow Governorate
- Date of death: 19 October 1981 (aged 63)
- Place of death: Moscow, Russian SFSR
- Height: 1.76 m (5 ft 9 1/2 in)
- Position: Forward

Senior career*
Years	Team	Apps	(Gls)
1936–1938	FC Dynamo Smolensk		
1938	CDKA Moscow	0	(0)
1939–1940	FC Torpedo Moscow	34	(13)
1941	Profsoyuzy-2 Moscow	6	(1)
1941–1951	FC Torpedo Moscow	144	(41)

Managerial career
- 1952–1954: FC Torpedo Moscow (assistant)
- 1957–1960: FC Zenit Leningrad
- 1961: FC Lokomotiv Moscow (assistant)
- 1962: FC Torpedo Moscow
- 1963: FC SiM Moscow
- 1964: FC Ararat Yerevan
- 1965–1966: FC Dynamo Makhachkala
- 1969: FC Uralmash Yekaterinburg
- 1969: FC Uralmash Yekaterinburg (team director)
- 1970: Neftchi PFK
- * Club domestic league appearances and goals

Georgi Ivanovich Zharkov (Russian: Георгий Иванович Жарков; born 19 August 1915 in Bogorodsk; died 19 October 1981 in Moscow) was a Soviet Russian football player and coach.

== Honours ==
- Soviet Top League bronze: 1945.
- Soviet Cup winner: 1949.
- Soviet Cup finalist: 1947.
