= Yevgeni Khrabrostin (footballer, born 1974) =

Russian footballer and referee

Personal information
- Full name: Yevgeni Yevgenyevich Khrabrostin
- Date of birth: 4 October 1974 (age 52)
- Height: 1.90 m (6 ft 3 in)
- Position: Defender

Youth career
- FC Dynamo Moscow

Senior career*
Years	Team	Apps	(Gls)
1992–1994	FC Torpedo Moscow	0	(0)
1992–1994	→ FC Torpedo-d Moscow	29	(0)
1994	FC KAMAZ Naberezhnye Chelny	2	(0)
1994	FC Torpedo Vladimir	4	(0)
1995	FC Lokomotiv Moscow	0	(0)
1995	→ FC Lokomotiv-d Moscow	33	(2)
1996	FC Volga Ulyanovsk	5	(0)
1999	FC Asmaral Moscow (amateur)		
2001	FC Oka Stupino (amateur)		
2002	FC Almaz Moscow (amateur)		
- * Club domestic league appearances and goals

Yevgeni Yevgenyevich Khrabrostin (Russian: Евгений Евгеньевич Храбростин; born 4 October 1974) is a Russian former football player and referee.

He worked as a referee in the Russian Third League in 1997.

His father, also named Yevgeni Khrabrostin, played football professionally, winning the Soviet Top League in 1977 with FC Torpedo Moscow.
