= Mikhail Belov =

Russian footballer

Personal information
- Full name: Mikhail Vladimirovich Belov
- Date of birth: 10 December 1966 (age 59)
- Place of birth: Volgograd, Soviet Union
- Height: 1.85 m (6 ft 1 in)
- Positions: Defender; midfielder

Team information
- Current team: Sokol Saratov (manager)

Senior career*
Years	Team	Apps	(Gls)
1989	FC Zvezda Gorodishche	29	(4)
1989–1991	FC Rotor Volgograd	18	(0)
1991	FC Zvezda Gorodishche	3	(0)
1992–1993	FC Tekstilshchik Kamyshin	16	(1)
1993	FC Orekhovo Orekhovo-Zuyevo	34	(2)
1994–1996	FC Torpedo Volzhsky	88	(20)
1996–1997	FC Energiya Kamyshin	36	(2)
1997	FC KAMAZ-Chally Naberezhnye Chelny	5	(0)
1998–1999	FC Nosta Novotroitsk	44	(8)
2000–2001	FC Svetotekhnika Saransk	36	(2)
2002–2003	FC Kosmos Yegoryevsk	35	(5)
Total		344	(44)

Managerial career
- 2007: FC Saturn Yegoryevsk (assistant)
- 2008–2010: FC Saturn-2 Moscow Oblast
- 2011–2012: FC Torpedo Moscow (assistant)
- 2012: FC Torpedo Moscow
- 2014–2016: FC Torpedo Moscow (assistant)
- 2016–2019: FC Nosta Novotroitsk
- 2019–2020: FC KAMAZ Naberezhnye Chelny
- 2021–2022: FC Rodina Moscow (assistant)
- 2022–2023: FC Novosibirsk (assistant)
- 2023: FC Novosibirsk
- 2023–2024: FC Kaluga
- 2024–2026: FC Volga Ulyanovsk
- 2026–: Sokol Saratov
- * Club domestic league appearances and goals

Mikhail Vladimirovich Belov (Russian: Михаил Владимирович Белов; born 10 December 1966) is a Russian professional football coach and a former player who is the manager of Sokol Saratov.

== Playing career ==
As a player, he made his debut in the Soviet Second League in 1989 for FC Zvezda Gorodishche.

== Honours ==
=== Individual ===
- Russian Professional Football League Zone best coach (for work with FC Nosta Novotroitsk) (2018–19).
