= Credit Bank of Moscow =

Russian banking company

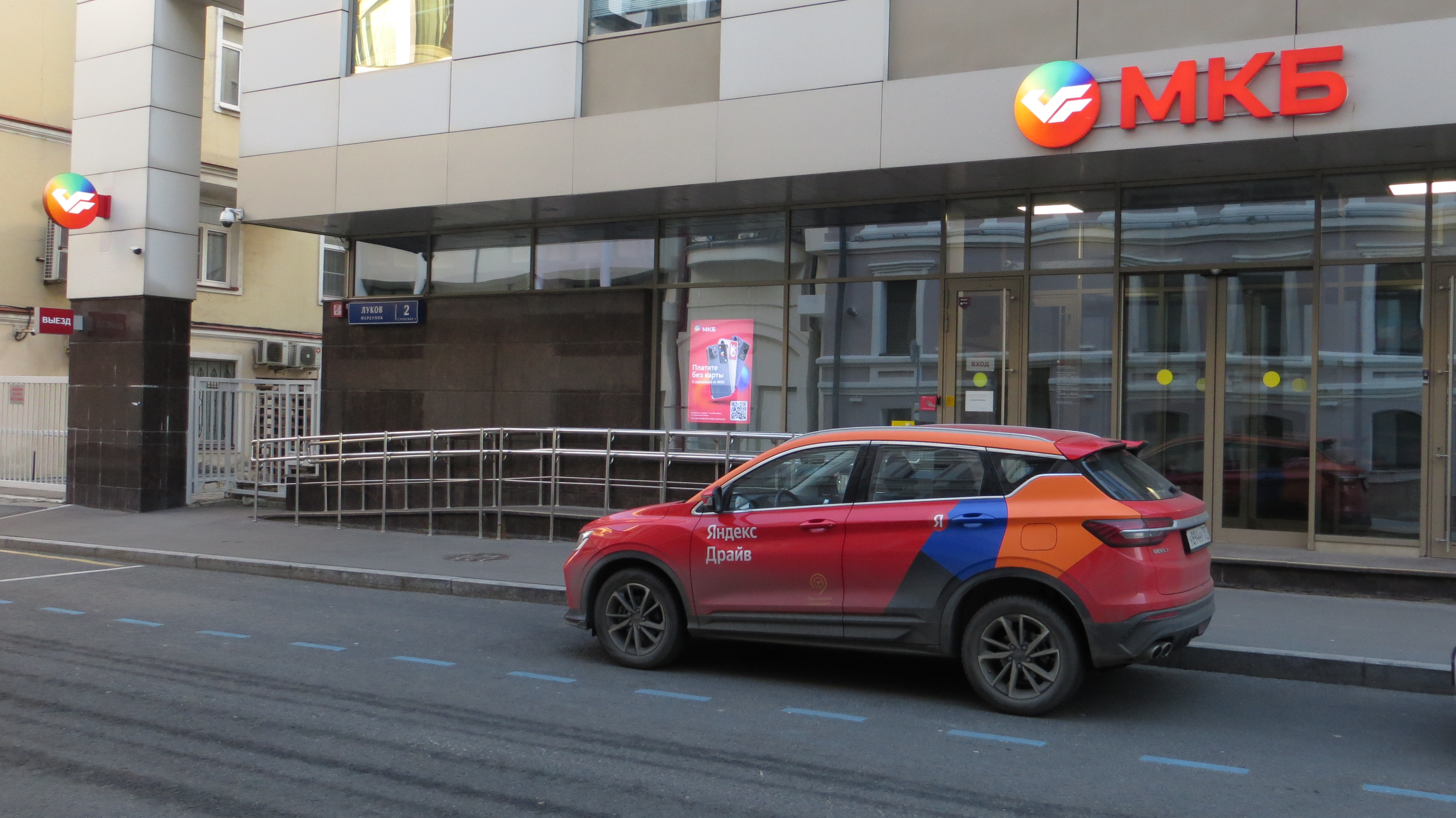
- Type: Public company
- Traded as: MCX: CBOM
- Industry: Banking
- Founded: 1992
- Headquarters: Moscow, Russia
- Key people: Roman Avdeev
- Revenue: $699 million (2019)
- Operating income: $561 million (2019)
- Net income: $185 million (2019)
- Total assets: $37.4 billion (2019)
- Total equity: $3.25 billion (2019)

Credit Bank of Moscow (Russian: Московский кредитный банк) is a Russian bank founded in 1992 and operating in Moscow and Moscow Oblast.

Between 2008 and 2015, the Moscow Credit Bank rose from 66th to 12th place in the Russian bank rating by assets. Its funds increased 20 times and achieved 115 billion rubles. In 2016, it entered the top 10 among leading Russian banks.

As of the first quarter of 2025, Credit Bank of Moscow is ranked as the seventh largest bank in Russia by asset size. The bank is the biggest private regional bank in Russia. It is considered a systemically important credit institution by the Central Bank of Russia.

== Ownership ==
Credit Bank of Moscow is owned by Roman Avdeev, the head of Ingrad real estate development company and Rossium concern. Before 2012, Avdeev was the only beneficiary of the Moscow Credit Bank. He bought the bank in 1994. Now he controls 55,73% of stocks.

Avdeev was the head of the international finance attraction department and the president of the Moscow Credit Bank. At the end of 2008, Avdeev stepped down, but remained a member of the Supervisory Council. In 2012, former Colorado governor Bill Owens joined the board and became its chair in 2013.

== History ==
At the end of 2020, CBM acted as an organizer of a €5.775 billion loan for Trafigura Group in its deal to acquire a 10% stake in Rosneft's Vostok Oil arctic project.

In March 2021, CBM bought the industrial commercial bank "Koltso Urala" (Ring of the Urals), which was controlled by the Ural Mining and Metallurgical Company. The deal is valued at 5.7 billion rubles (about $770 million). The bank will continue to serve the activities of the UMMC.

According to the Forbes World's Best Banks list, published in April 2021, Moscow Credit Bank ranks second among Russian banks.

In July 2021, S&P upgraded MKB's credit rating from BB− to BB with a stable outlook. "CBM has demonstrated the stability of its business in an unstable market situation, as evidenced by its indicators of loan losses and indicators of asset quality", the agency said in a statement.

In 2021, the bank reported a profit of 29 billion rubles, and in 2022, it was 8.7 billion rubles. No dividends have been paid to shareholders since 2019.

In 2023, several anonymous sources reported that the bank decided to change its strategy and refocus on the corporate market. The strategy is expected to be presented in autumn 2023. The Credit bank of Moscow denied this information. According to the bank's official press statement, it will continue to develop both retail and corporate investment areas.

== Sanctions ==
On 24 February 2022, the United States announced sanctions on Russian banks, including the Credit Bank of Moscow, in response to the 2022 Russian invasion of Ukraine. In June 2022 the bank was removed from the SWIFT payment system and in December 2022 the EU also sanctioned the Credit Bank of Moscow in relation to the invasion.
