= Fyodor Selin =

Soviet footballer and coach

Personal information
- Full name: Fyodor Ilyich Selin
- Date of birth: 7 March 1899
- Place of birth: Tula, Russia
- Date of death: 8 October 1960 (aged 61)
- Place of death: Moscow, USSR
- Positions: Striker; midfielder

Youth career
- Davydkovo Moscow Oblast

Senior career*
Years	Team	Apps	(Gls)
1916–1917	SKL Moscow		
1918–1922	SKZ Moscow		
1923	Yakht-Klub Raykomvoda Moscow		
1924–1925	MSFK Moscow		
1926–1927	Tryokhgorka Moscow		
1927–1935	FC Dynamo Moscow		
1936–1937	FC Serp i Molot Moscow		

International career
1924–1925	USSR	2	(1)

Managerial career
- 1945: FC Torpedo Moscow
- 1946: Dzerzhinets Chelyabinsk
- 1947: Pishchevik Moscow (director)
- * Club domestic league appearances and goals

Fyodor Ilyich Selin (Russian: Фёдор Ильич Селин; 7 March 1899 – 8 October 1960) was a Soviet football player and coach.

== Honours ==
- RSFSR champion: 1922, 1927, 1928.
- USSR champion: 1923, 1928, 1931, 1932.

== International career ==
Selin made his debut for USSR on 16 November 1924 in a friendly against Turkey.
