= Nikolai Morozov (footballer) =

Russian footballer (1916–1981)

Personal information
- Full name: Nikolai Petrovich Morozov
- Date of birth: 25 August 1916
- Place of birth: Lyubertsy, Russian Empire
- Date of death: 15 October 1981 (aged 65)
- Place of death: Moscow, Russian SFSR, USSR
- Height: 1.76 m (5 ft 9 in)
- Position: Midfielder

Senior career*
Years	Team	Apps	(Gls)
1938–1940	Torpedo Moscow		
1941	Spartak Moscow		
1945–1949	Torpedo Moscow		
1950–1951	VVS Moscow		

Managerial career
- 1953–1955: Torpedo Moscow
- 1959–1962: Lokomotiv Moscow
- 1963: Torpedo Moscow
- 1964–1966: USSR
- 1967: Torpedo Moscow
- 1967–1968: Chornomorets Odesa
- 1971: Chornomorets Odesa
- 1972: Shakhtar Donetsk
- * Club domestic league appearances and goals

Nikolai Petrovich Morozov (Russian: Николай Петрович Морозов; 25 August 1916 – 13 October 1981) was a Russian football coach, who led the USSR national football team to a fourth-place finish in the 1966 FIFA World Cup.
