= Andrei Redkous =

Soviet footballer (1957–2021)

Personal information
- Full name: Andrei Viktorovich Redkous
- Date of birth: 13 June 1957
- Place of birth: Kansk, Krasnoyarsk Krai, Russian SFSR, Soviet Union
- Date of death: 3 November 2021 (aged 64)
- Height: 1.77 m (5 ft 10 in)
- Position: Forward

Senior career*
Years	Team	Apps	(Gls)
1974	Avtomobilist Krasnoyarsk		
1974–1979	Zenit Leningrad	115	(23)
1980–1986	Torpedo Moscow	154	(41)
1987	→ Znamya Truda Orekhovo-Zuyevo (loan)	4	(0)
1987	Kapaz Kirovabad	12	(5)
1988–1989	FC Torpedo Vladimir	38	(10)
Total		323	(79)
- * Club domestic league appearances and goals

Andrei Viktorovich Redkous (Russian: Андрей Викторович Редкоус; 13 June 1957 – 3 November 2021) was a Soviet professional footballer who played as a forward.

== Honours ==
- Soviet Cup: 1986
- Soviet Cup: runner-up 1982
