= Viktor Maslov (footballer, born 1910) =

Russian footballer

Personal information
- Full name: Viktor Aleksandrovich Maslov
- Date of birth: 27 April 1910
- Place of birth: Moscow, Russian Empire
- Date of death: 11 May 1977 (aged 67)
- Place of death: Moscow, Soviet Union

Senior career*
Years	Team	Apps	(Gls)
1930	RDPK Moscow	?	(?)
1931–40	FC Torpedo Moscow	?	(?)
1941	FC Profsoyuz-1 Moscow	?	(?)
1941–42	FC Torpedo Moscow	?	(?)

Managerial career
- 1942–48: FC Torpedo Moscow
- 1949–51: Torpedo Gorky
- 1954–55: FC FShM Moscow
- 1956: Burevestnik Chişinău
- 1957–61: FC Torpedo Moscow
- 1962–63: FC SKA Rostov-na-Donu
- 1964–70: FC Dynamo Kyiv
- 1971–73: FC Torpedo Moscow
- 1975: FC Ararat Yerevan
- * Club domestic league appearances and goals

Viktor Aleksandrovich Maslov (Russian: Виктор Александрович Маслов; April 27, 1910 in Moscow – May 11, 1977) was a Soviet and Russian footballer and coach. He was especially notable during his coaching career. He won numerous USSR Championships with clubs Torpedo Moscow, Dynamo Kyiv, and one with FC Ararat Yerevan.

== Career ==
He is often seen as being one of the most innovative and influential football managers of all time. He was the first to experiment with players' nutrition, and invented the 4-4-2 formation, along with the notion of pressing, which, in the words of Jonathan Wilson "may be seen as the birth of modern football". Wilson credits Maslov as one of the progenitors of the pressing game. This was a key development, as before Maslov, teams tended to allow their opponents more time on the ball, whereas Maslov's strategy of pressing denied players this time and space, and led to the game based more on speed and fitness that is common across the top European and South American leagues today.
