= Giorgi Gudushauri =

Georgian footballer and rugby player

Giorgi Ghudushauri
Personal information
- Full name: Giorgi Ghudushauri
- Date of birth: 18 February 1973 (age 53)
- Place of birth: Tbilisi, Georgian SSR
- Height: 1.74 m (5 ft 9 in)
- Position: Midfielder

Senior career*
Years	Team	Apps	(Gls)
1990	Martve Tbilisi	8	(2)
1991–1992	Krtsanisi Tbilisi	32	(15)
1992–1994	Gorda Rustavi	46	(14)
1994	Kakheti Telavi	6	(2)
1994–1997	FSV Salmrohr	50	(5)
1998	Torpedo Moscow	7	(2)
1998–1999	Locomotive Tbilisi	13	(4)
1999–2000	Dinamo Tbilisi	6	(0)
2002–2003	FSV Wacker 90 Nordhausen		
2003–2004	Ameri Tbilisi	5	(1)

International career
1995–1998	Georgia	8	(0)
- * Club domestic league appearances and goals

Giorgi Ghudushauri (born 18 February 1973 in Tbilisi) is a retired Georgian professional football and rugby player.

Ghudushauri appeared for the Georgia national team in a May 1996 friendly against Greece. In November 1996, he made a substitute's appearance in a 1998 FIFA World Cup qualifier against England.
