= Yury Mironov =

Soviet footballer and Russian football manager

Personal information
- Full name: Yury Matveyevich Mironov
- Date of birth: 10 July 1948 (age 78)
- Position: Defender

Team information
- Current team: FC Torpedo Moscow (scout)

Senior career*
Years	Team	Apps	(Gls)
1967–1969	FC Khimik Novomoskovsk	79	(10)
1970–1971	FC Torpedo Moscow	17	(0)
1972	FC Torpedo Kutaisi	20	(1)
1973–1974	FC Iskra Smolensk		
1975–1979	FC Torpedo Moscow	68	(0)
1980	FC TOZ Tula		
1981–1983	FC Kuzbass Kemerovo		

Managerial career
- 1986: FC Kuzbass Kemerovo (director)
- 1987–1989: FC Kuzbass Kemerovo
- 1990–1992: FC Torpedo Moscow (assistant)
- 1992–1994: FC Torpedo Moscow
- 2000: FC Torpedo Moscow (scout)
- 2002–2010: FC Torpedo Moscow (assistant)
- 2011–: FC Torpedo Moscow (scout)
- * Club domestic league appearances and goals

Yury Matveyevich Mironov (Russian: Юрий Матвеевич Миронов; born 10 July 1948) is a professional association football coach from Russia and a former Soviet player currently working as an assistant coach with FC Torpedo Moscow.

As a player, he played eight seasons in the Soviet Top League with FC Torpedo Moscow.

== Honours ==
=== As a player ===
- Soviet Top League champion: 1976 (autumn)
- Soviet Top League bronze: 1977

=== As a manager ===
- Russian Cup winner: 1992/1993
