= Yevgeni Khrabrostin (footballer, born 1951) =

Russian footballer

Personal information
- Full name: Yevgeni Borisovich Khrabrostin
- Date of birth: 15 August 1951 (age 75)
- Height: 1.80 m (5 ft 11 in)
- Position: Forward

Senior career*
Years	Team	Apps	(Gls)
1970–1973	FC Spartak Ryazan		
1973–1974	FC SKA Rostov-on-Don	19	(2)
1975–1980	FC Torpedo Moscow	128	(31)
1982	FC Znamya Truda Orekhovo-Zuyevo	25	(12)
1983	FC Dynamo Kirov	14	(1)
- * Club domestic league appearances and goals

Yevgeni Borisovich Khrabrostin (Russian: Евгений Борисович Храбростин; born 15 August 1951) is a former Russian football player.

His son, also called Yevgeni Khrabrostin, also played football professionally, including a stint in the Russian Football Premier League with FC KAMAZ Naberezhnye Chelny.

== Honours ==
Torpedo Moscow

- Soviet Top League champion: 1976 (autumn)
- Soviet Top League bronze: 1977
- Soviet Cup finalist: 1977
