= Lasha Monaselidze =

Georgian footballer

Personal information
- Date of birth: 2 January 1977 (age 49)
- Height: 1.83 m (6 ft 0 in)
- Position: Midfielder

Senior career*
Years	Team	Apps	(Gls)
1994–1997	ASK Tbilisi	87	(21)
1997	FC Kolkheti-1913 Poti	0	(0)
1998	ASK Tbilisi	13	(2)
1998	FC Torpedo Moscow	2	(0)
1998	FC Torpedo Vladimir	0	(0)
1999	FC Krylia Sovetov Samara	0	(0)
1999–2000	FC Dinamo Tbilisi	6	(1)
2001–2002	FC Gorda Rustavi	4	(0)
2003–2004	Pontiakos Nea Santa	11	(0)

International career
1998	Georgia	1	(0)
- * Club domestic league appearances and goals

Lasha Monaselidze (Georgian: ლაშა მონასელიძე; born 2 January 1977) is a retired Georgian professional football player.
