= Roman Avdeev =

Russian banker and public person

Roman Adveev
- Роман Авдеев
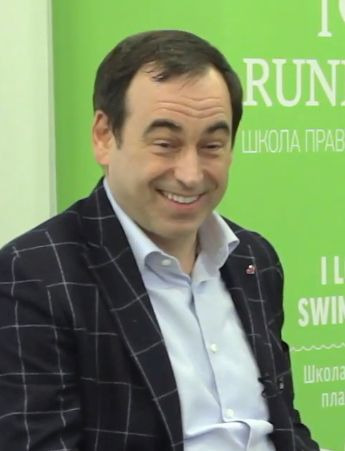
- Avdeev in 2017
- Born: 17 June 1967 (age 58); Odintsovo, Moscow Oblast, Russian SFSR, Soviet Union
- Education: Moscow Power Engineering Institute (1986), Moscow International University of Business and Information Technologies (1994), Lipetsk State Technical University (1996)
- Occupations: Businessman; investor; philanthropist
- Years active: 1994–present
- Children: 23 (19 adopted)
- Website: romanavdeev.ru/en/

Roman Ivanovich Avdeev (Russian: Роман Иванович Авдеев; born 17 June 1967) is a Russian businessman, investor, and philanthropist. In 2018, his fortune was estimated at $1.5 billion.

== Early life and education ==
Roman Avdeev was born on 17 July 1967, in Odintsovo, Moscow region.

In 1984, he enrolled at Moscow Power Engineering Institute. After just 2 years at the university, he was drafted into the army. He graduated in Construction Engineering from the Lipetsk State Technical University in 1996. In 1999, Adveev completed a course in Banking from Moscow International University of Business and Management.

== Business career ==
In the late 1980s, Avdeev started his first business, selling radio components and decoders for TV sets. He was importing computer equipment into Russia, which led to a business with a Ukrainian electronics manufacturer ElectronMash.

In 1994, he bought the Credit Bank of Moscow. Avdeev made a fortune on cash-handling business in the 1990s.

In 1996, Avdeev invested in agriculture, but sold his agricultural business in 2006. In 2006, he established Rossium Concern holding company to consolidate his assets. In the 2010s he started to invest into real estate development and construction. Through Rossium, he came into co-ownership of the "36.6" pharmacy chain, founded in 1991 by Artem Bektemirov and Sergey Krivosheyev. Avdeev and the company's CEO, Vladimir Kintsurashvili, have been blamed for the chain's "aggressive" business dealings.

In 2013, Forbes included Avdeev with the net worth of $1.4 billion into the lists of European and global billionaires for the first time.

In 2014, Adveev’s holding company Garden Hills consolidated more than 98% of Veropharm, one of the largest drug makers in Russia. He then sold Garden Hills to Abbott for an estimated $650 million. In 2016, he bought OPIN development group from Mikhail Prokhorov and integrated it into its real estate assets.

In 2017, Avdeev became the co-owner of FC Torpedo Moscow club.

Roman Avdeev in October 2024 said that he had sold his stake in the Rossium Group holding and that he no longer held any assets in Russia and would be spending more time with his many children.

== Assets ==
- Credit Bank of Moscow (56% of shares),
- FC Torpedo Moscow,
- 36.6 pharmacy chain (13.76% of shares),
- Ingrad construction and real estate development company,
- Soglasie and OPK pension funds.

== Philanthropy ==
In 2014, Avdeev established Arithmetic of Good (Russian: Арифметика добра) fund to help Russian orphans and adoptive families. As of September 2018, it was supporting over 1000 orphans and over 1200 adoptive families. In 2016, Avdeev co-authored Caravan of happy stories (Russian: Караван счастливых историй) book about adoptive families. In 2017, he was awarded the Wings of the stork (Russian: Крылья аиста) award from the Government of Moscow as a patron of the year.

== Personal life ==
Adveev has 23 children, 19 of whom are adopted. He started to adopt orphans in 2002, when he was 35. As of 2013, Adveev and Sulaiman Abdul Aziz Al Rajhi were two members of Forbes billionaires list with 23 children.
