= FC Torpedo Moscow =

Association football club in Russia

Torpedo Moscow
- Full name: Torpedo Moscow Football Club
- Nicknames: Cherno-belie (The Black and Whites); Avtozavodtsi (Car factory workers)
- Founded: 17 August 1924; 102 years ago
- Ground: Eduard Streltsov Stadium
- Capacity: 15,076
- Owner(s): Leonid Sobolev; Nikolai Storozhuk; Vladimir Kozhaev
- President: Dmitri Shapoval
- Head coach: Vyacheslav Vashkevich
- League: Russian First League
- 2025–26: 9th of 18
- Website: www.torpedo.ru
Home colours	Away colours

Football Club Torpedo Moscow (Russian: ФК "Торпедо" Москва, FK Torpedo Moskva), known as Torpedo Moscow, is a Russian professional football club based in Moscow. The club plays in the Russian First League. Their colours are white and black, with green also commonly being associated with the club. They play their home games at Eduard Streltsov Stadium, but have been playing at Luzhniki Stadium since their home stadium began a reconstruction project in 2021.

The new stadium is designed by the architects Michel Remon and Alexis Peyer from the French office MR&A.

Torpedo are historically one of the big Moscow clubs who enjoyed great domestic success during the Soviet era. In recent history, however, the club has suffered from financial troubles and poor management which has seen them drop down the divisions. A top flight club since promotion in 1938, Torpedo were relegated for the first time in their history following the 2006 Russian Premier League season and have only played two campaigns in the top division since, in 2014–15 and 2022-23, being relegated in both top-flight seasons after finishing in relegation spots, while spending the other seasons bouncing around between the second and third tiers.

== History ==
=== Name history ===
- AMO (1930–1932) – owned by Avtomobilnoe Moskovskoe Obshchestvo (AMO).
- ZIS (1933–1936) – after owner's name AMO was changed to Zavod Imeni Stalina (ZIS).
- Torpedo Moscow (1936–July 1996) – when they became one of the founding members of the Soviet 'B' League.
- Torpedo-Luzhniki (August 1996 – 1998) – as they became property of the Luzhniki corporation.
- Torpedo Moscow (1998–present)

FK Sarajevo at the time of its establishment first appeared on the Yugoslav sports scene in 1946 under the name Fiskulturno društvo Torpedo as an homage to FK Torpedo Moscow, which club kept for about a year before taking current one.

=== Club history ===
Torpedo Moscow Football Club (based on Proletarskaya Kuznitsa teams) was formed in 1924 by the AMO automotive plant (later known as "Stalin Automotive Plant – ZIS" and later "Likhachev Automotive Plant – ZIL").

They played in the Moscow League until 1936 when they became one of the founder members of the Soviet 'B' League and changed their name to Torpedo Moscow. In 1938, they were promoted to the 'A' League. In 1949, Torpedo won their first professional title, the USSR Cup. In 1957 Torpedo Moscow, as well as other Soviet sport clubs named "Torpedo", became a part of the republican VSS Trud of the Russian Soviet Federative Socialist Republic.

Nicknamed "the Black-Whites," Torpedo has not been a major force in Russian football since the days of Eduard Streltsov, the brilliant striker of the 1950s and 1960s, known as "the Russian Pelé." In 1960, Torpedo won the double; the Top League and the USSR Cup.

Torpedo had its glory period in the 1980s and early 90s, when they made six Soviet/Russian Cup finals, winning the 1985–86 Soviet Cup and the 1992–93 Russian Cup, and finished in the top 6 7/8 times from 1983 to 1991.

The club used to belong to the ZIL automobile plant until a fallout in the mid-1990s that resulted in Torpedo leaving their historic ground and moving across town to Luzhniki, as they became property of the Luzhniki corporation and its name was changed to Torpedo-Luzhniki between (1996–1997) before it was renamed Torpedo Moscow.

Torpedo-Luzhniki logo (1996–1997).

After selling Torpedo Moscow in 1996, ZIL created a new team, Torpedo-ZIL (1997), which debuted in the Third Division and reached the Russian Premier League in 2000. However, ZIL sold the team to MMC Norilsk Nickel in 2003, where it was relaunched as FC Moscow. This new team, however, was eventually dissolved after spending the 2010 season in Amateur Football League when its owner and main sponsor, MMC Norilsk Nickel, withdrew funding.

After selling Torpedo-ZIL in 2003, ZIL created another team, Torpedo-ZIL (2003), which began play in the Third Division. This team, however, was also eventually disbanded in 2011 after its efforts to seek promotion to the First Division failed.

Under SC Luzhniki ownership (1996–2009), the team had some high points that had not been reached since the Soviet era, such as finishing in the top four of the Russian Premier League from 1999 to 2002 – including a third-placed finish in 2000 – but were relegated to the First Division in 2006 and after two seasons it fell further to the Second Division. In early 2009, Luzhniki sold the team back to ZiL. For most of this era, the team played at Luzhniki Stadium. It was speculated that ZIL would merge Torpedo Moscow and Torpedo-ZIL (2003), but instead an independent Torpedo Moscow spent 2009 in the Amateur Football League, later earning two consecutive promotions to gain a spot in the First Division in 2011. In their first season back in the First Division, the team finished eighth during the first half of the tournament at the end of 2011, taking them through to a Top 8 Promotion playoff during the season's second half.

In the 2012–13 season, Torpedo barely avoided relegation to the second division. At the end of the championship the head coach was replaced once again when 42-year-old Vladimir Kazakov was hired, who played for Torpedo in the past. Several players with experience of playing at the highest level were acquired. However, in the first 6 matches, Torpedo were able to earn only two points; manager Kazakov took the blame and resigned. In 2013, a team led by Aleksandr Borodyuk began to become more competitive, ultimately placing third in the 2013–14 season and securing a playoff spot for promotion to the Premier League. The team drew the previous year's 14th-placed Premier League team, Krylia Sovetov Samara, in a game held on 18 May 2014 at the stadium in suburban Ramenskoye, which ended 2–0 for Torpedo. On 22 May, in the tie's second leg at Metallurg Stadium in Samara, Torpedo played to a draw, thus prevailing on aggregate and returning to the Premier League after an eight-year absence.

The 2014–15 season began poorly for Torpedo in the top division; in the first matchday, the club was defeated 1–4 by CSKA Moscow. At the end of the season, the team was relegated back to the Russian Football National League after finishing second-last, in 15th. Due to a lack of financing, however, Torpedo could only receive licensing for play in the third-tier Russian Professional Football League for 2015–16 season, thus sealing a two-level relegation.

In 2017 Torpedo got a new owner – Roman Avdeev, who is a Russian billionaire and the head of Ingrad real estate development company and Rossium concern.

The Eduard Streltsov Stadium, Torpedo's home stadium, is also owned by Rossium. In 2017 Roman Avdeev announced the reconstruction of the stadium. Work began in 2021, once completed, the capacity will be 15,000 (all-seated).

In July 2018 Erving Botaka's failed transfer back to Torpedo Moscow made headlines across Europe when it was reported the club canceled his contract because the ultras refused to allow a black footballer to play for the club. Torpedo later denied this via an official statement but the Torpedo ultras were adamant with their own statement. At the end of the 2018–19 season, they were promoted back to the second-tier FNL. Torpedo won the 2021–22 Russian Football National League to secure the return to the Premier League for the first time in 16 years on 21 May 2022. They were relegated after one season at the top level.

On 24 May 2025, Torpedo secured the second place in the First League and promotion back to the Russian Premier League for the 2025–26 season.

On 19 June 2025, club co-owner Leonid Sobolev and general director Valeri Skorodumov were arrested on suspicion of attempting to bribe referee Maksim Perezva. They are suspected of offering Perezva 6,000,000 rubles (approximately 66,000 euros) for giving Torpedo advantage in three games from March 2025 to May 2025 in which he was expected to be the referee, Perezva reported their offer to the police. The investigators searched their offices and homes, confiscating communication devices and documents. Russian Football Union opened their own investigation, with Russian Premier League commenting that Torpedo could hypothetically be replaced in the 2025–26 Russian Premier League, but only before the league competition starts. On 8 July 2025, referee Bogdan Golovko, who did not award a penalty kick against Torpedo on the last day of the 2024–25 season (a decision later deemed incorrect by the official RFU refereeing review commission) was also arrested on the charge of "illegally influencing an official sporting event". Torpedo's game ended in a draw and they finished the First League season in 2nd place, a promotion spot, one point ahead of FC Chernomorets Novorossiysk. If Torpedo lost the game, Chernomorets would finish ahead of Torpedo as they would be tied on points, and Chernomorets held the head-to-head tiebreaker against Torpedo. The placement question became moot shortly as Chernomorets was not able to acquire the Premier League license for the season, and Torpedo would have been promoted even if they finished behind Chernomorets, but that was not a certainty at the time of the game. On the same day, Russian Football Union announced that the decision about Torpedo's punishment, if any, would be made on 10 July 2025. On 10 July 2025, RFU excluded Torpedo from the Premier League, banned Skorodumov and Sobolev from football activity (for 10 and 5 years respectively) and fined Torpedo 5 million rubles (approximately 55,000 euros).

== Supporters and rivalries ==
The fans of Torpedo are "twinned" with the fans of Spartak.

Torpedo's rivalries are with the other Moscow clubs (excluding Spartak), Lokomotiv, CSKA, and Dynamo, with whom they contest the Moscow derbies, as well as FC Zenit Saint Petersburg.

It has been reported that some fans have displayed far-right symbols and banners both during and outside of matches, such as the Celtic Cross and the Swastika, which has been reported negatively by media on several occasions.

== Torpedo kits ==
FC Torpedo Moscow kits
in final 1986 in final 1972 in final 1968 in final 1960 in final 1952 in final 1949

== Ownerships, kit suppliers, and Sponsors ==
Period	Kit manufacturers	Period	Title sponsors
1976—1990	Adidas	1976—1987	No Sponsors
1976—1990	Adidas	1988—1990	Danieli
1990—1996	Umbro	1990—1991	Kodak Copiers
1990—1996	Umbro	1991—1996	Holsten
1997—1998	Reebok	1997	No sponsors
1997—1998	Reebok	1998	Reebok
1999—2003	Diadora	1999	No sponsors
1999—2003	Diadora	2000	Rosneft
1999—2003	Diadora	2001—2003	No sponsors
2004	Le Coq Sportif	2004	No sponsors
2005—2009	Umbro	2005—2008	No sponsors
2005—2009	Umbro	2009	Energy Consulting
2010	Adidas	2010	Energy Consulting
2011—2012	Umbro	2011—2012	Agent.ru
2012—2013	Adidas	2012—2013	ZiL
2013—2018	Legea	2013	No sponsors
2013—2018	Legea	2014—2015	Gorenje
2018—2019	Joma	2018—2022	INGRAD
2019—2020	Macron	2018—2022	INGRAD
2020—2022	Nike	2018—2022	INGRAD
2022—2023	Puma	2022—2024	Pari
2023—2024	Ничего Обычного	2022—2024	Pari
2024—	Puma	2024—	Tennisi bet

== Honours ==
=== Domestic competitions ===
- Russian Football National League (2nd Tier)
  - Winners (1): 2021–22
- Soviet Top League:
  - Winners (3): 1960, 1965, 1976 (autumn)
  - Runners-up (3): 1957, 1961, 1964
- Soviet Cup / Russian Cup:
  - Winners (7): 1949, 1952, 1960, 1968, 1972, 1985–86, 1992–93
  - Runners-up (9): 1947, 1958, 1961, 1966, 1977, 1982, 1988–88, 1988–89, 1990–91
- Soviet Super Cup:
  - Runners-up (1): 1987

=== Non-official ===
- Ciutat de Lleida Trophy: 1

1991

== League history ==
=== Soviet Union ===
Season	Div.	Pos.	Pl.	W	D	L	GS	GA	P	Cup	Europe		Top scorer (league)	Head coach	Notes
1936	2nd	2	6	3	1	2	10	7	13	—	—				Spring tourn.
1936	2nd	4	7	4	0	3	11	7	15	—	—				Autumn tourn.
1937	2nd	6	12	4	4	4	16	18	24	R16	—				Promoted due to league expansion
1938	1st	9	25	9	11	5	51	38	29	R16	—		(Soviet Union) Sinyakov – 15 (Soviet Union) P. Petrov – 15	(Soviet Union) Bukhteev	
1939	1st	9	26	8	7	11	51	51	23	R64	—		(Soviet Union) Zharkov – 13	(Soviet Union) Bukhteev (Soviet Union) Kvashnin	
1940	1st	11	24	6	6	12	36	50	18	—	—		(Soviet Union) Zharkov – 9	(Soviet Union) Kvashnin	
1941	did not participate														
No league and cup competitions in 1942–1943
1944	No competition									SF	—				
1945	1st	3	22	12	3	7	41	21	27	R16	—		(Soviet Union) Panfilov – 14		
1946	1st	4	22	11	5	6	44	29	27	SF	—		(Soviet Union) A. Ponomaryov – 18	(Soviet Union) V. Maslov	
1947	1st	5	24	9	6	9	36	29	24	RU	—		(Soviet Union) Zharkov – 9	(Soviet Union) V. Maslov	
1948	1st	5	26	15	3	8	58	43	33	QF	—		(Soviet Union) A. Ponomaryov – 19	(Soviet Union) V. Maslov (Soviet Union) Nikitin	
1949	1st	4	34	16	10	8	64	42	42	W	—		(Soviet Union) A. Ponomaryov – 19	(Soviet Union) Nikitin (Soviet Union) Kvashnin	
1950	1st	10	36	13	10	13	57	60	36	R32	—		(Soviet Union) V. Ponomaryov – 12	(Soviet Union) Kvashnin	
1951	1st	12	28	8	8	12	37	48	24	R32	—		(Soviet Union) Nechaev – 8	(Soviet Union) Moshkarkin (Soviet Union) Rzhevtsev	
1952	1st	10	13	3	6	4	11	15	12	W	—		(Soviet Union) Nechaev – 3 (Soviet Union) Gabichvadze – 3	(Soviet Union) V. Maslov	
1953	1st	3	20	11	3	6	24	24	25	QF	—		(Soviet Union) Vatskevich – 9	(Soviet Union) V. Maslov (Soviet Union) N. Morozov	
1954	1st	9	24	8	6	10	34	34	22	R16	—		(Soviet Union) Vatskevich – 9	(Soviet Union) N. Morozov	
1955	1st	4	22	10	8	4	39	32	28	R16	—		(Soviet Union) Streltsov – 15	(Soviet Union) N. Morozov	
1956	1st	5	22	8	7	7	40	37	23	—	—		(Soviet Union) V. Ivanov – 13	(Soviet Union) Beskov	
1957	1st	2	22	11	6	5	46	23	28	SF	—		(Soviet Union) V. Ivanov – 14	(Soviet Union) V. Maslov	
1958	1st	7	22	7	8	7	51	42	22	RU	—		(Soviet Union) V. Ivanov – 14	(Soviet Union) V. Maslov	
1959	1st	5	22	11	3	8	27	23	25	—	—		(Soviet Union) Falin – 7	(Soviet Union) V. Maslov	
1960	1st	1	30	20	5	5	56	25	45	W	—		(Soviet Union) Gusarov – 12	(Soviet Union) V. Maslov	
1961	1st	2	30	19	3	8	68	35	41	RU	—		(Soviet Union) Gusarov – 22	(Soviet Union) V. Maslov	
1962	1st	7	32	15	8	9	64	32	48	QF	—		(Soviet Union) Gusarov – 15	(Soviet Union) Zharkov	
1963	1st	10	38	12	16	10	46	41	40	R16	—		(Soviet Union) V. Ivanov – 17	(Soviet Union) Zolotov (Soviet Union) N. Morozov	
1964	1st	2	33	19	8	6	53	23	46	R32	—		(Soviet Union) V. Ivanov – 14	(Soviet Union) Zolotov	
1965	1st	1	32	22	7	3	55	21	51	R32	—		(Soviet Union) Streltsov – 12	(Soviet Union) Maryenko	
1966	1st	6	36	15	10	11	55	39	40	RU	—		(Soviet Union) Streltsov – 12	(Soviet Union) Maryenko	
1967	1st	12	36	12	9	15	38	47	33	QF	EC	R32	4 players – 6	(Soviet Union) N. Morozov (Soviet Union) V. Ivanov	
1968	1st	3	38	18	4	6	60	32	50	W	CWC	QF	(Soviet Union) Streltsov – 21	(Soviet Union) V. Ivanov	
1969	1st	5	32	13	10	9	36	27	36	QF	—		(Soviet Union) Pais – 8	(Soviet Union) V. Ivanov	
1970	1st	6	32	12	10	10	36	38	34	QF	CWC	R32	(Soviet Union) G. Shalimov – 6	(Soviet Union) V. Ivanov	
1971	1st	7	30	4	20	6	27	27	28	SF	—		(Soviet Union) Pais – 6	(Soviet Union) V. Maslov	
1972	1st	9	30	11	9	10	31	33	31	W	—		(Soviet Union) Y. Smirnov – 12	(Soviet Union) V. Maslov	
1973	1st	13	30	9	1+7	13	28	37	19	R32	—		(Soviet Union) Y. Smirnov – 8	(Soviet Union) V. Maslov (Soviet Union) V. Ivanov	
1974	1st	4	30	13	7	10	35	28	33	R16	CWC	R32	(Soviet Union) Nikonov – 12	(Soviet Union) V. Ivanov	
1975	1st	4	30	13	8	9	42	33	34	R32	—		(Soviet Union) Khrabrostin – 7	(Soviet Union) V. Ivanov	
1976	1st	12	15	5	4	6	15	20	14	R16	UC	R16	(Soviet Union) Degterev – 5 (Soviet Union) Sergey V. Grishin – 5	(Soviet Union) V. Ivanov	Spring tourn.
1976	1st	1	15	9	2	4	20	9	20	R16	UC	R16	(Soviet Union) Khrabrostin – 5 (Soviet Union) V. Sakharov – 5	(Soviet Union) V. Ivanov	Autumn tourn.
1977	1st	3	30	12	13	5	30	23	37	RU	—		(Soviet Union) 4 players – 4	(Soviet Union) V. Ivanov	
1978	1st	8	30	11	11	8	36	29	30	SF	EC	R32	(Soviet Union) Khrabrostin – 7	(Soviet Union) V. Ivanov	
1979	1st	16	34	8	9	17	32	46	24	Qual.	UC	R32	(Soviet Union) N. Vasilyev – 14	(Soviet Union) Salkov	
1980	1st	11	34	10	11	13	28	32	30	QF	—		(Soviet Union) Redkous – 7	(Soviet Union) Salkov	
1981	1st	5	34	14	14	6	41	29	38	Qual.	—		(Soviet Union) Petrakov – 10	(Soviet Union) V. Ivanov	
1982	1st	8	34	11	12	11	36	33	32	RU	—		(Soviet Union) Redkous – 12	(Soviet Union) V. Ivanov	
1983	1st	6	34	14	11	9	40	34	38	R16	CWC	R32	(Soviet Union) Petrakov – 11	(Soviet Union) V. Ivanov	
1984	1st	6	34	15	10	9	43	36	40	QF	—		(Soviet Union) Redkous – 14	(Soviet Union) V. Ivanov	
1985	1st	5	34	13	10	11	42	40	36	R16	—		(Soviet Union) Kobzev – 9	(Soviet Union) V. Ivanov	
1986	1st	9	30	10	11	9	31	28	30	W	—		(Soviet Union) Y. Savichev – 12	(Soviet Union) V. Ivanov	
1987	1st	4	30	12	12	6	35	25	34	QF	CWC	QF	(Soviet Union) Y. Savichev – 10	(Soviet Union) V. Ivanov	
1988	1st	3	30	17	8	5	39	23	42	RU	—		(Soviet Union) Grechnev – 9 (Soviet Union) A. Rudakov – 9	(Soviet Union) V. Ivanov	
1989	1st	5	30	11	13	6	40	26	35	RU	UC	R64	(Soviet Union) Grechnev – 11 (Soviet Union) Y. Savichev – 11	(Soviet Union) V. Ivanov	
1990	1st	4	24	13	4	7	28	24	30	QF	CWC	R16	(Soviet Union) Y. Savichev – 8	(Soviet Union) V. Ivanov	
1991	1st	3	30	13	10	7	36	20	36	RU	UC	QF	(Soviet Union) Tishkov – 8	(Soviet Union) V. Ivanov (Soviet Union) Skomorokhov	

=== Russia ===
Season	Div.	Pos.	Pl.	W	D	L	GS	GA	P	Cup	Europe		Top scorer (league)	Head coach	Notes
1992	1st	11	30	12	6	12	32	30	30	R32	UC	R32	(Russia) G. Grishin – 10	(Russia) Skomorokhov (Russia) Y. Mironov	
1993	1st	7	34	15	8	11	35	40	38	W	UC	R32	(Russia) Borisov – 7	(Russia) Y. Mironov	
1994	1st	11	30	7	12	11	28	37	26	R32	CWC	R32	(Russia) Afanasyev – 8	(Russia) Y. Mironov (Russia) Petrenko (Russia) V. Ivanov	
1995	1st	5	30	16	7	7	40	30	55	QF	—		(Russia) D. Prokopenko – 6 (Russia) Agashkov – 6	(Russia) V. Ivanov	
1996	1st	12	34	10	11	13	42	51	41	R32	—		(Russia) Kamoltsev – 9	(Russia) V. Ivanov	
1997	1st	11	34	13	6	15	50	46	45	QF	UC; IC	R64; SF	(Lithuania) Jankauskas – 10	(Russia) Tarkhanov	
1998	1st	11	30	9	10	11	38	34	37	R16	—		(Russia) V. Bulatov – 9	(Russia) Tarkhanov (Russia) V. Ivanov	
1999	1st	4	30	13	11	6	38	33	50	R32	—		(Russia) Kamoltsev – 12	(Russia) V. Shevchenko	
2000	1st	3	30	16	7	7	42	29	55	R32	—		(Russia) Vyazmikin – 8	(Russia) V. Shevchenko	
2001	1st	4	30	15	7	8	53	42	52	QF	UC	R128	(Russia) Vyazmikin – 17	(Russia) V. Shevchenko	
2002	1st	4	30	14	8	8	47	32	50	R32	UC	R128	(Russia) Semshov – 11	(Russia) V. Shevchenko (Russia) Petrenko	
2003	1st	8	30	11	10	9	42	38	43	R32	—		(Russia) Shirko – 7	(Russia) Petrenko	
2004	1st	5	30	16	6	8	53	37	54	R32	UC	R32	(Russia) Panov – 15	(Russia) Petrenko	
2005	1st	7	30	12	9	9	37	33	45	QF	—		(Russia) Semshov – 12	(Russia) Petrenko	
2006	1st	15	30	3	13	14	22	40	22	QF	—		(Russia) Budylin – 4	(Russia) Petrenko (Russia) Gostenin	Relegated
2007	2nd	6	42	21	6	15	75	59	69	R16	—		(Belarus) Romashchenko – 15	(Russia) R. Sabitov	
2008	2nd	18	42	14	7	21	47	69	49	R32	—		(Russia) Popov – 9	(Russia) Dayev	Relegated to 4th level due to financial irregul.
2009	LFL (4th), "Moscow"	1	32	30	0	2	128	19	90	R64	—		(Russia) Aleksei Chereshnev – 23	(Russia) Pavlov	Promoted
2010	3rd, "Centre"	1	30	17	6	7	59	26	57	R32	—		(Russia) Burmistrov – 10	(Russia) Chugainov	Promoted
2011–12	2nd	8	52	17	17	18	63	53	68	R32	—		(Russia) Khozin – 9 (Russia) Dorozhkin – 9	(Russia) Chugainov (Russia) Belov	
2012–13	2nd	14	32	6	15	11	29	38	33	R32	—		(Russia) Bezlikhotnov – 7	(Russia) Belov (Russia) Ignatyev	
2013–14	2nd	3	36	19	8	9	45	22	65	Fourth round	—		(Russia) I. Shevchenko – 8	(Russia) Borodyuk	Promoted
2014–15	1st	15	30	6	11	13	28	45	29	R8	—		(Belarus) Putsila – 4	(Russia) Savichev (Russia) Petrakov	Relegated to 3rd level
2015–16	3rd	12	26	8	6	12	21	28	30	Second round	—		(Russia) Tyupikov - 5	(Russia) Petrakov	
2016–17	3rd	3	24	11	9	4	36	19	42	Fourth round	—		(Russia) Gonezhukov - 5 (Russia) Chernyshov - 5	(Russia) Bulatov	
2017–18	3rd	6	26	11	9	6	44	22	42	Third Round	—		(Azerbaijan) Sadykhov - 8	(Russia) Kolyvanov	
2018–19	3rd	1	26	20	5	1	48	17	65	Round of 32	—		(Russia) Sergeyev - 16	(Russia) Kolyvanov	Promoted
2019–20	2nd	4	27	16	5	6	39	25	53	Quarterfinal	—		(Russia) Sergeyev - 14	(Russia) S. Ignashevich	
2020–21	2nd	6	42	21	9	12	65	41	72	R64	—		(Russia) Kalmykov - 12		
2021–22	2nd	1	38	20	15	3	65	36	75	R32	—		(Tajikistan) Sultonov - 15		Promoted

== European campaigns ==
Torpedo Moscow's best campaigns in Europe were reaching the quarter-finals of the 1990–91 UEFA Cup, losing to Brøndby on penalties, and the quarter-finals of the 1986–87 European Cup Winners' Cup, losing to Bordeaux on away goals.

== Youth structure ==
Torpedo have one of Russia's best and largest football education structures, ranging from the club's academy to several football schools around the city associated with the club, who provide financial and technical support to them. Torpedo's football school, which would later become the club's academy, was founded in 1957 and has traditionally been one of the strongest producers of players in Russia with many players making the step-up to the first team and others being moved onto other clubs after graduating from the academy. Torpedo's school has also been under the jurisdiction of Torpedo-ZIL and FC Moscow at various points in history amid changes in the club's ownership.

The club has produced some of Russia's most important players in history, including national team legends, twin brothers Aleksei Berezutski and Vasili Berezutski, Sergei Ignashevich, who would later go on to manage the club and Eduard Streltsov, a club legend who would have Torpedo's stadium named after him. Other graduates of the club's famed academy include former Chelsea and Celtic goalkeeper Dmitri Kharine, Zenit goalkeeper Andrey Lunyov, Pavel Mamaev, Kirill Nababkin, Valentin Ivanov, Valery Voronin, Aleksandr Ryazantsev.

Torpedo's reserve squad, the highest level of their academy, has played professionally in the Russian football pyramid as FC Torpedo-d Moscow (Russian Second League in 1992–93, Russian Third League in 1994–95), FC Torpedo-Luzhniki-d Moscow (Russian Third League in 1996–97) and FC Torpedo-2 Moscow (Russian Second Division in 1998–2000). They have since returned to youth football with FC Torpedo-M currently the final stage of Torpedo's academy, competing in the youth competitions in Russia.

On January 26, 2022, the Board of Directors of Torpedo Moscow decided to revive the Torpedo-2 for its further participation in Russian Football National League 2.

== Players ==
=== Current squad ===
As of 11 September 2026, according to the Russian First League official website.

Note: Flags indicate national team as defined under FIFA eligibility rules; some limited exceptions apply. Players may hold more than one non-FIFA nationality.

No.	Pos.	Nation	Player
2	DF	RUS	Nikita Bozov (on loan from Baltika Kaliningrad)
3	DF	RUS	Aleksandr Ivankov
4	DF	RUS	Sergei Borodin (vice-captain)
5	MF	RUS	Vladimir Moskvichyov
8	MF	NGR	Usman Ajibona (on loan from Alashkert)
7	FW	RUS	Aleksandr Yushin
9	MF	RUS	Stepan Oganesyan
10	FW	RUS	Dmitri Tsypchenko
11	FW	RUS	Ruslan Apekov
14	DF	RUS	Yegor Burkhin
17	MF	RUS	Ilya Berkovsky
19	FW	RUS	Abdurazak Isadibirov
20	FW	NGR	Jonathan Okoronkwo
21	MF	RUS	Artur Galoyan
22	DF	BLR	Yegor Parkhomenko
24	MF	RUS	Artyom Pogosov

No.	Pos.	Nation	Player
25	GK	RUS	Rostislav Soldatenko
27	MF	RUS	Aleksandr Orekhov
44	DF	RUS	Daniil Kornyushin
48	GK	RUS	Sergey Mokrousov
51	GK	RUS	Yaroslav Zgiblov
52	DF	RUS	Denis Bukin
53	MF	RUS	Nikita Biletsky
54	MF	RUS	Prokhor Zimerov
55	DF	RUS	Timofey Dubrovin
58	GK	RUS	Danil Ladokha (on loan from Rodina Moscow)
69	MF	RUS	Aleksey Koltakov
79	FW	RUS	Aleksei Kashtanov
84	DF	RUS	Vadim Churilov
90	DF	MNE	Bojan Roganović
97	MF	CRO	Mario Ćurić
99	DF	BLR	Gleb Shevchenko

=== Out on loan ===
Note: Flags indicate national team as defined under FIFA eligibility rules; some limited exceptions apply. Players may hold more than one non-FIFA nationality.

No. / Pos. / Nation / Player; — / MF / RUS / Sadyg Bagiyev (at SKA-Khabarovsk until 30 June 2027)	No. / Pos. / Nation / Player; — / MF / BLR / Aleksandr Guz (at SKA-1938 Minsk until 31 December 2026)

=== Other players under contract ===
Note: Flags indicate national team as defined under FIFA eligibility rules; some limited exceptions apply. Players may hold more than one non-FIFA nationality.

No.	Pos.	Nation	Player
—	MF	MLI	Mamadou Camara

== Personnel ==
Position	Name	Nationality
Caretaker:	Sergey Zhukov	(Russia)
Analyst:	Igor Stebenev	(Russia)
Team supervisor:	Aleksandr Nikolaev	(Russia)
Administrator:	Aleksandr Petrov	(Russia)
Administrator:	Georgi Viktorov	(Russia)
Chief doctor:	Kirill Ivanov	(Russia)
Doctor:	Yan Gobedashvili	(Russia)
Physiotherapist:	Aleksei Zavgorodni	(Russia)
Rehabilitologist-physiotherapist:	Ilya Nabatchikov	(Russia)
Masseur:	Aleksandr Krasilnikov	(Russia)
Masseur:	Stjepko Škreblin	(Croatia) (Russia)
Team Operator:	Andrei Sherstobitov	(Russia)

== Notable players ==
Had international caps for their respective countries. Players whose name is listed in bold represented their countries while playing for Torpedo.

USSR/Russia

- (Soviet Union) Leonid Buryak
- (Soviet Union) **Vyacheslav Chanov**
- (Soviet Union) Viktor Grachyov
- (Soviet Union) **Valentin Ivanov**
- (Soviet Union) Viktor Losev
- (Soviet Union) Aleksandr Maksimenkov
- (Soviet Union) **Nikolai Manoshin**
- (Soviet Union) **Slava Metreveli**
- (Soviet Union) Nikolai Parshin
- (Soviet Union) Valeriy Petrakov
- (Soviet Union) Boris Pozdnyakov
- (Soviet Union) **Sergei Prigoda**
- (Soviet Union) **Vladimir Sakharov**
- (Soviet Union) **Nikolai Savichev**
- (Soviet Union) **Yuri Savichev**
- (Soviet Union) Sergey Shavlo
- (Soviet Union) **Eduard Streltsov**
- (Soviet Union) **Yuri Susloparov**
- (Soviet Union) **Valery Voronin**
- (Soviet Union) **Vasili Zhupikov**
- (Soviet Union) (Commonwealth of Independent States) (Russia) Dmitri Kharine
- (Soviet Union) (Russia) Andrei Chernyshov
- (Soviet Union) (Tajikistan) **Oleg Shirinbekov**
- (Commonwealth of Independent States) **Sergey Shustikov**
- (Commonwealth of Independent States) (Russia) **Igor Chugainov**
- (Russia) **Andrei Afanasyev**
- (Russia) Diniyar Bilyaletdinov
- (Russia) Sergei Borodin
- (Russia) Denis Boyarintsev
- (Russia) **Aleksei Bugayev**
- (Russia) **Viktor Bulatov**
- (Russia) Yevgeni Bushmanov
- (Russia) **Vyacheslav Dayev**
- (Russia) Vadim Evseev
- (Russia) Yury Gazinsky
- (Russia) Lyubomir Kantonistov
- (Russia) **Dmitri Khokhlov**
- (Russia) Oleg Kornaukhov
- (Russia) Ilya Kutepov
- (Russia) Andrey Lunyov
- (Russia) Pavel Mamayev
- (Russia) Yuri Matveyev
- (Russia) Ivan Novoseltsev
- (Russia) **Aleksandr Panov**
- (Russia) Nikolai Pisarev
- (Russia) **Aleksandr Podshivalov**
- (Russia) Dmitri Poloz
- (Russia) Denis Popov
- (Russia) Aleksandr Ryazantsev
- (Russia) **Igor Semshov**
- (Russia) Ivan Sergeyev
- (Russia) **Aleksandr Shirko**
- (Russia) Roman Shishkin
- (Russia) Igor Smolnikov
- (Russia) Andrei Solomatin
- (Russia) **Konstantin Zyryanov**
- (Russia) (Tajikistan) Mukhsin Mukhamadiev

Former USSR countries
Armenia

- (Armenia) **Roman Berezovsky**
- (Armenia) Vardan Khachatryan
- (Armenia) **Arthur Mkrtchyan**
- (Armenia) Tigran Petrosyan
- (Armenia) **Albert Sarkisyan**
- (Armenia) Artyom Simonyan

Azerbaijan

- (Azerbaijan) Daniel Akhtyamov
- (Azerbaijan) Dmitriy Kramarenko

Belarus

- (Belarus) **Radaslaw Arlowski**
- (Belarus) **Valery Gromyko**
- (Belarus) Denis Laptev
- (Belarus) Andrei Lavrik
- (Belarus) **Dmitry Lentsevich**
- (Belarus) **Alyaksandar Lukhvich**
- (Belarus) Yegor Parkhomenko
- (Belarus) **Maksim Romaschenko**
- (Belarus) **Dzmitry Rawneyka**
- (Belarus) **Pavel Sedko**
- (Belarus) Valer Shantalosau
- (Belarus) **Gleb Shevchenko**
- (Belarus) **Roman Yuzepchuk**
- (Belarus) **Yuri Zhevnov**

Georgia

- (Georgia (country)) **Giorgi Ghudushauri**
- (Georgia (country)) **Georgi Kipiani**
- (Georgia (country)) **Lasha Monaselidze**
- (Georgia (country)) **Edik Sadzhaya**

Kazakhstan

- (Kazakhstan) **Aleksandr Familtsev**

Kyrgyzstan

- (Kyrgyzstan) **Gulzhigit Alykulov**
- (Kyrgyzstan) Valery Kichin

Moldova

- (Moldova) **Mihail Caimacov**
- (Moldova) Alexandru Namaşco
- (Moldova) **Serghei Namaşco**
- (Moldova) Adrian Sosnovschi

Tajikistan

- (Tajikistan) **Arsen Avakov**
- (Tajikistan) Igor Cherevchenko
- (Tajikistan) Valeri Sarychev

Ukraine

- (Ukraine) Oleksandr Pryzetko
- (Ukraine) Pavlo Shkapenko
- (Ukraine) **Serhiy Skachenko**
- (Ukraine) Serhiy Symonenko
- (Ukraine) **Valeriy Vorobyov**

Uzbekistan

- (Uzbekistan) **Khojimat Erkinov**
- (Uzbekistan) **Alexander Geynrikh**
- (Uzbekistan) **Aleksandr Sayun**

Europe
Bosnia and Herzegovina

- (Bosnia and Herzegovina) Igor Savić
- (Bosnia and Herzegovina) **Amir Spahić**
- (Bosnia and Herzegovina) **Emir Spahić**

Estonia

- (Estonia) **Enar Jääger**
- (Estonia) **Dmitri Kruglov**
- (Estonia) **Andres Oper**
- (Estonia) **Andrei Stepanov**
- (Estonia) **Vladimir Voskoboinikov**
- (Estonia) **Sergei Zenjov**

Iceland

- (Iceland) Arnór Smárason

Latvia

- (Latvia) **Juris Laizāns**

Lithuania

- (Lithuania) **Edgaras Jankauskas**
- (Lithuania) Saulius Klevinskas
- (Lithuania) **Tomas Mikuckis**
- (Lithuania) **Aidas Preikšaitis**
- (Lithuania) **Tomas Ražanauskas**
- (Lithuania) Mantas Samusiovas
- (Lithuania) **Valdas Trakys**
- (Lithuania) **Rimantas Žvingilas**

North Macedonia

- (North Macedonia) Artim Položani

Poland

- (Poland) Adam Kokoszka
- (Poland) **Marcin Kuś**
- (Poland) Grzegorz Piechna

Romania

- (Romania) **Cristian Dancia**
- (Romania) George Florescu

Serbia

- (Serbia) **Đorđe Jokić**

Slovenia

- (Slovenia) **Dalibor Stevanović**

South America
Peru

- (Peru) Yordy Reyna

Africa
Gambia

- (The Gambia) **Abdou Jammeh**

Nigeria

- (Nigeria) **Augustine Eguavoen**

Asia & Oceania
Australia

- (Australia) **Ivan Franjic**

For full list, see Category:FC Torpedo Moscow players

== Player records ==
=== Most appearances ===
As of the match played 20 April 2007 and according to official site. Players in bold are still currently playing for Torpedo Moscow.

#	Name	Career	Appearances
1	(Soviet Union) Viktor Shustikov	1958–72	427
2	(Soviet Union) Sergei Prigoda	1976–88	325
3	(Soviet Union) Aleksandr Polukarov	1980–91	319
4	(Soviet Union) Vladimir Yurin	1970–80	304
5	(Soviet Union) Valentin Ivanov	1953–66	287
6	(Soviet Union) Sergei Petrenko	1974–85	276
7	(Soviet Union) Leonid Pakhomov	1967–76	261
8	(Soviet Union) Vasiliy Zhupikov	1977–85	255
9	(Soviet Union) Viktor Kruglov	1975–81, 1984–86	231
10	(Soviet Union) Vladimir Buturlakin	1970, 1972–80	226

=== Most goals scored ===
#	Name	Career	Goals
1	(Soviet Union) Valentin Ivanov	1953–66	124
2	(Soviet Union) Eduard Streltsov	1954–58, 1965–70	105
3	(Soviet Union) Aleksandr Ponomaryov	1945–50	83
4	(Soviet Union) Gennadiy Gusarov	1957–62	67
5	(Soviet Union) Georgiy Zharkov	1939–40, 1945–51	63
6	(Soviet Union) Pyotr Petrov	1938–40, 1945–49	54
7	(Russia) Igor Semshov	1998–2005	54
8	(Soviet Union) Yuri Savichev	1985–90	47
9	(Soviet Union) Nikolai Vasilyev	1976–85	45
10	(Soviet Union) Oleg Sergeev	1958–66	43

== Managerial history ==
Year	Name	Achievement	Remarks
1932–34	Sergei Bukhteyev (1896–1948)		Russian champion 1922 (SKZ, player) died in GULAG
1936–37	Nikolai Nikitin (1895–1960)		organized Moscow youth football school replaced in July
1937–39	Sergei Bukhteyev (1896–1948)		replaced in May
1939–40	Konstantin Kvashnin (1898–1982)		
1945	Viktor Maslov (1910–77)		player of RDPK (1930), AMO, ZiS (1931–35), Torpedo (1936–40) for Torpedo 66 games, 1 goal replaced in August
1945–46	Fyodor Selin (1899–1960)	Bronze (Soviet Top League)	
1946–48	Viktor Maslov (1910–77)	Lost in finals to Spartak 1–2	replaced in July
1948–49	Nikolai Nikitin (1895–1960)		replaced in May
1949–50	Konstantin Kvashnin (1898–1982)	First Soviet Cup (FC Dynamo Moscow 2–1)	replaced at the end 1950
1951	Vladimir Moshkarin (1914–94)		Torpedo (1945–50) 89 games, 2 goals replaced in July
1951	Andrei Rzhevtsev (1910–98)		replaced at the end of 1951
1952–53	Viktor Maslov (1910–77)	Second Soviet Cup (Spartak Moscow 1–0)	replaced in August
1953–55	Nikolai Morozov (1916–81)	Bronze (Soviet Top League)	Torpedo (1938–49) 153 games, 5 goals replaced in October
1956	Konstantin Beskov (1920–2006)		coached six Moscow teams at the Top level
1957–61	Viktor Maslov (1910–77)	First title (1960), third Soviet Cup (Dinamo Tbilisi 4–3 aet), silver twice (Soviet Top League), Soviet Cup finalist twice	
1962	Georgi Zharkov (1918–81)		Torpedo (1939–51) 191 games, 63 goals
1963	Yuriy Zolotov (1929–98)		Torpedo (1950–56) 60 games, 13 goals part of club's staff (1959–94 with breaks) replaced in April
1963	Nikolai Morozov (1916–81)		
1964–66	Viktor Maryenko (1929–2007)	Second title (1965), Silver (Soviet Top League), Soviet Cup finalist (Dynamo Kyiv 0–2)	Torpedo (1954–59) 88 games, 1 goal coach of youth school 1981, 1988–92
1967	Nikolai Morozov (1916–81)		replaced in July
1967–70	Valentin Ivanov (1934–2011)	Fourth Soviet Cup (Paxtakor Toshkent 1–0), silver (Soviet Top League)	Torpedo (1952–66) 287 games, 124 goals
1971–73	Viktor Maslov (1910–77)	Fifth Soviet Cup (Spartak Moscow 0–0, 1–1, pk 5–1)	replaced in August
1973–78	Valentin Ivanov (1934–2011)	Third and last title (fall'76), bronze (Soviet Top League), Soviet Cup finalist (FC Dynamo Moscow 0–1)	
1979–80	Vladimir Salkov (1937–)		replaced in July
1980–91	Valentin Ivanov (1934–2011)	Sixth Soviet Cup (Shakhtar Donetsk 1–0), bronze (Soviet Top League), Soviet Cup finalist four other times	replaced in September
1991–92	Yevgeni Skomorokhov (1945–2002)	Bronze (Soviet Top League)	replaced in August
1992–94	Yury Mironov (1948–)	First Russian Cup (CSKA Moscow 1–1, pk 5–3)	Torpedo (1970–71, 1975–78) 85 games replaced in July
1994	Sergei Petrenko (1955–)		Torpedo (1972–85) 276 games, 23 goals coached Torpedo-ZiL (later) replaced in August
1994–96	Valentin Ivanov (1934–2011)		
1997–98	Aleksandr Tarkhanov (1954–)		replaced in May
1998	Valentin Ivanov (1934–2011)		
1999–2002	Vitaly Shevchenko (1951–)	Bronze (Russian Premier League)	replaced in July
2002–06	Sergei Petrenko (1955–)		replaced in September
2006	Aleksandr Gostenin (1955–)		Torpedo (1981–86) 145 games replaced in November
2007	Georgi Yartsev (1948–)		replaced in June
2007	Vyacheslav Dayev (1972–)		Torpedo (1999–2001) 87 games, 8 goals replaced in July
2007–08	Ravil Sabitov (1968–)		replaced in May
2008–09	Vyacheslav Dayev (1972–)		
2010	Sergei Pavlov (1955–)		
2010–12	Igor Chugainov (1970–)		
2012	Mikhail Belov (1966–)		
2012–13	Boris Ignatyev (1940–)		
2013	Nikolai Savichev (1965–)		
2013–14	Aleksandr Borodyuk (1962–)		
2014	Nikolai Savichev (1965–)		
2014–16	Valery Petrakov (1958–)		
2016–17	Viktor Bulatov (1972–)		
2017–19	Igor Kolyvanov (1968–)		
2019–2020	Nikolai Savichev (1965–)		
2020–2021	Sergei Ignashevich (1979–)		
2021–2022	Aleksandr Borodyuk (1962–)		
2022	Nikolai Savichev (1965–)		
2022–2023	Andrei Talalaev (1972–)		
2023	Pep Clotet (1977–)		
2023	Artyom Gorlov (1987–)		
2023	Artyom Gorlov (1987–)		
2024–2025	Oleg Kononov (1966–)		
2025	Pavel Kirilchik (1981–)		
2025–	Sergey Zhukov (1967–)		
