= Grigori Pinaichev =

Soviet Russian footballer and coach

Personal information
- Full name: Grigori Markovich Pinaichev
- Date of birth: 22 January 1913
- Place of birth: Moscow, Russia
- Date of death: 26 July 1988 (aged 75)
- Place of death: Moscow, Soviet Union
- Height: 1.74 m (5 ft 8 1/2 in)
- Position: Defender

Senior career*
Years	Team	Apps	(Gls)
1931–1937	Tryokhgorka Moscow		
1938	BVO Minsk		
1939–1941	CDKA Moscow	41	(0)
1943–1944	CDKA Moscow		

Managerial career
- 1954–1957: CSK MO
- 1960: FC CSKA Moscow
- 1964–1965: CSKA Cherveno zname Sofia
- 1968: SKA Rostov-on-Don
- * Club domestic league appearances and goals

Grigori Markovich Pinaichev (Russian: Григорий Маркович Пинаичев; 22 January 1913 in Moscow – 26 July 1988 in Moscow) was a Soviet Russian football player and coach.
