= Vladimir Dorofeev =

Russian politician (1937–2024)

- Владимир Дорофеев

Member of the Soviet of the Republic
- In office 13 June 1990 – 21 September 1993

Personal details
- Born: Vladimir Mikhailovich Dorofeev; 1937 Yaroslavl Oblast, Russian SFSR, USSR
- Died: 9 May 2024 (aged 86–87) Yaroslavl, Russia
- Party: CPSU; CPRF

Vladimir Mikhailovich Dorofeev (Russian: Владимир Михайлович Дорофеев; 1937 – 9 May 2024) was a Russian politician. A member of the Communist Party of the Soviet Union and later the Communist Party of the Russian Federation, he served in the Soviet of the Republic from 1990 to 1993.

Dorofeev died in Yaroslavl on 9 May 2024.
