= Pavel Khalkiopov =

Soviet Russian footballer and coach

Personal information
- Full name: Pavel Vasilyevich Khalkiopov
- Date of birth: 1905
- Place of birth: Moscow, Russia
- Date of death: 2 September 1968 (aged 62–63)
- Place of death: Moscow, Soviet Union
- Height: 1.76 m (5 ft 9 1/2 in)
- Position: Defender

Senior career*
Years	Team	Apps	(Gls)
1920–1922	FC SKL Moscow		
1924–1934	CDKA Moscow		

Managerial career
- 1931–1938: CDKA Moscow (team director)
- 1936: CDKA Moscow
- * Club domestic league appearances and goals

Pavel Vasilyevich Khalkiopov (Russian: Павел Васильевич Халкиопов; 1905 in Moscow – 2 September 1968 in Moscow) was a Soviet Russian football player and coach.
