= German Apukhtin =

Russian footballer

Personal information
- Full name: German Nikolayevich Apukhtin
- Date of birth: 12 June 1936
- Place of birth: Moscow, USSR
- Date of death: 2003 (aged 66–67)
- Position: Striker

Youth career
- Metropoliten Moscow
- FC Lokomotiv Moscow

Senior career*
Years	Team	Apps	(Gls)
1955–1956	FC Lokomotiv Moscow	17	(3)
1957–1964	CSK MO/CSKA Moscow	141	(42)
1965–1966	SKA Novosibirsk	52	(25)
1966–1967	SKA Odesa	20	(4)
1967–1968	FC Metallurg Lipetsk		

International career
1957–1958	USSR	5	(0)
Medal record
Representing Soviet Union
UEFA European Championship
Winner	1960 France
- * Club domestic league appearances and goals

German Nikolayevich Apukhtin (Russian: Герман Николаевич Апухтин; born 12 June 1936 - 2003 ) was a Soviet Russian footballer.

== Honours ==
- Soviet Top League bronze: 1958, 1964.
- 1960 European Nations' Cup winner: 1960.
- Top 33 players year-end list: 1956, 1957, 1959, 1960.

== International career ==
Apukhtin made his debut for USSR on 1 June 1957 in a friendly against Romania. He played in the 1958 FIFA World Cup. He was selected for the squad for the first ever European Nations' Cup in 1960, where the Soviets were champions, but did not play in any games at the tournament.
