= Yevgeni Skomorokhov =

Russian footballer and coach

Personal information
- Full name: Yevgeni Vasilyevich Skomorokhov
- Date of birth: 11 July 1945
- Date of death: 10 November 2002 (aged 57)
- Positions: Defender; midfielder

Senior career*
Years	Team	Apps	(Gls)
1967	FC Moldova Kishinyov	0	(0)
1968	FC Rassvet Krasnoyarsk	13	(0)
1968–1969	FC Pakhtakor Tashkent	1	(0)
1969–1971	FC Avtomobilist Krasnoyarsk	9	(0)
Total		23	(0)

Managerial career
- 1990–1991: FC Torpedo Moscow (assistant)
- 1991–1992: FC Torpedo Moscow
- 1993–1994: Esteghlal Tehran
- 1997: FC Torpedo Vladimir
- 1999: Esteghlal Tehran
- 2000: Liaoning FC
- 2002: FC Torpedo Vladimir
- * Club domestic league appearances and goals

Yevgeni Vasilyevich Skomorokhov (Russian: Евгений Васильевич Скоморохов; July 11, 1945 – November 10, 2002) was a Russian professional football coach and player.
