= Sergey Bukhteyev =

Soviet Russian footballer and coach

Personal information
- Full name: Sergey Vasilyevich Bukhteyev
- Date of birth: 1 January 1897
- Place of birth: Moscow, Russia
- Date of death: December 1947 (aged 50)
- Height: 1.72 m (5 ft 7 1/2 in)
- Position: Forward

Senior career*
Years	Team	Apps	(Gls)
1910–1914	FC Novogireyevo Moscow		
1914	FC RKS Moscow		
1915	FC Novogireyevo Moscow		
1916	FC Veshnyaki Moscow		
1916–1918	FC Novogireyevo Moscow		
1919	FC KFS Moscow		
1922	FC SKZ Moscow		
1923	FC Yakht-Klub Raykomvoda Moscow		
1924–1925	FC Mossovet Moscow		
1925–1926	FC Pishcheviki Moscow		
1927–1929	FC Tryokhgorka Moscow		
1930	FC Pishcheviki Moscow		

Managerial career
- 1932–1934: FC ZIS Moscow
- 1936–1937: FC Dynamo Gorky
- 1937–1939: FC Torpedo Moscow
- 1940–1941: CDKA Moscow
- * Club domestic league appearances and goals

Sergey Vasilyevich Bukhteyev (Russian: Сергей Васильевич Бухтеев; born 1 January 1897 in Moscow; died in December 1947) was a Soviet Russian football player and coach.

On 1 May 1947 he was arrested and on 13 September 1947 convicted of anti-Soviet agitation and sentenced to 8 years of imprisonment, dying in the prison camp the same year. He was rehabilitated in 1956.
