= Boris Kopeykin =

Soviet footballer and Russian coach

Personal information
- Full name: Boris Arkadyevich Kopeykin
- Date of birth: 27 March 1946 (age 80)
- Place of birth: Chelyabinsk, Russian SFSR
- Position: Striker

Youth career
- 1958–1963: Traktor Chelyabinsk

Senior career*
Years	Team	Apps	(Gls)
1964–1966	Lokomotiv Chelyabinsk		
1967–1968	FC SKA Khabarovsk	34	(8)
1969–1977	PFC CSKA Moscow	223	(71)
1978–1983	GSVG		

International career
1970–1972	USSR	6	(0)

Managerial career
- 1983–1987: PFC CSKA Moscow (youth teams)
- 1988: PFC CSKA-2 Moscow
- 1989–1993: PFC CSKA Moscow (assistant)
- 1993: FC Metallurg Magnitogorsk
- 1993–1994: PFC CSKA Moscow
- 2002: FC Presnya Moscow
- 2002–2003: FC Tashir-VILSI Kaluga
- 2009–2011: FC Prialit Reutov
- * Club domestic league appearances and goals

Boris Arkadyevich Kopeykin (Russian: Борис Аркадьевич Копейкин; born 27 March 1946 in Chelyabinsk) is a retired Soviet football player and a current Russian coach.

== Honours ==
- Soviet Top League winner: 1970.
- Top 33 players year-end list: three times.

== International career ==
Kopeykin made his debut for USSR on 28 October 1970 in a friendly against Bulgaria. He played in the UEFA Euro 1972 qualifiers, but was not selected for the final tournament squad.
