= Lasha Dekanosidze =

Georgian footballer

Personal information
- Date of birth: 9 July 1987 (age 39)
- Place of birth: Tbilisi, Georgian SSR
- Height: 1.77 m (5 ft 9 1/2 in)
- Position: Defender

Senior career*
Years	Team	Apps	(Gls)
2003–2004	Akademia-Iberia Tbilisi	3	(0)
2005–2007	OMC-Dighomi Tbilisi		
2007–2008	Orbebi Tbilisi	23	(1)
2008	BATE Borisov	0	(0)
2009	Dinamo-2 Tbilisi	1	(0)
2009	Spartaki Tskhinvali	9	(0)
2010	Torpedo Zhodino	1	(0)
2011	KajHa		
2013	ORPa	14	(6)
2014	Merani Martvili	7	(0)
- * Club domestic league appearances and goals as of 5 December 2014

Lasha Dekanosidze (Georgian: ლაშა დეკანოსიძე; born 9 July 1987) is a Georgian former professional football player.
