= Oleksandr Pohoryelov =

Soviet and Ukrainian footballer and coach

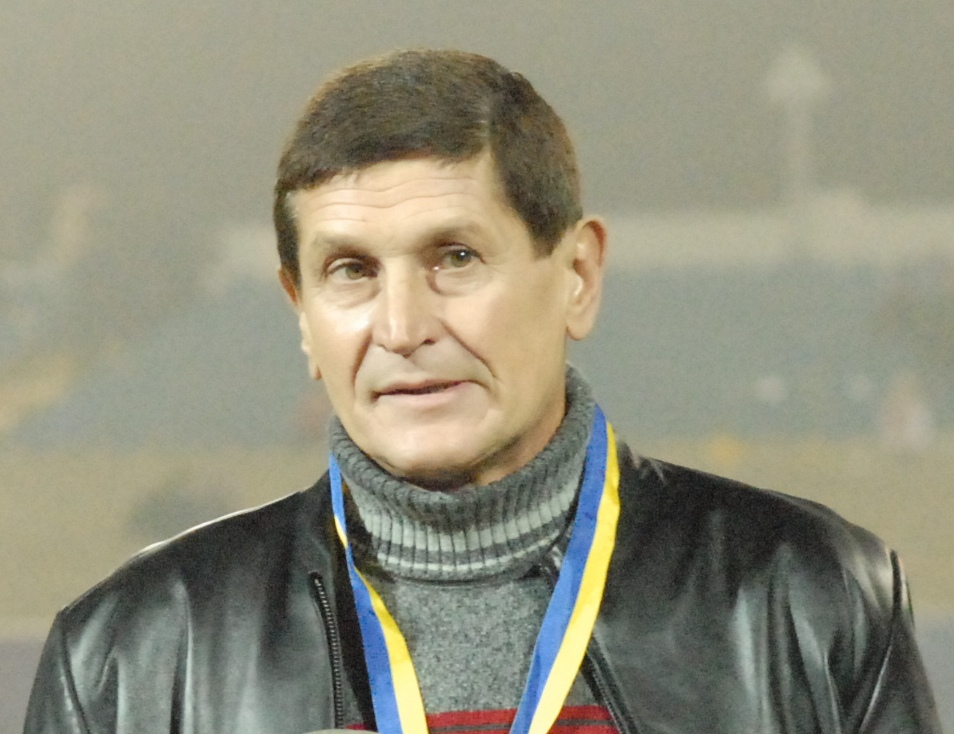

Personal information
- Full name: Oleksandr Heorhiyovych Pohoryelov
- Date of birth: 22 January 1952
- Place of birth: Valuyki, Russian SFSR
- Date of death: 17 October 2007 (aged 55)
- Place of death: Odesa, Ukraine
- Height: 1.82 m (5 ft 11 1/2 in)
- Position: Striker

Senior career*
Years	Team	Apps	(Gls)
1972–1975	FC Pamir Dushanbe	110	(39)
1976–1977	FC Chornomorets Odesa	55	(15)
1978–1979	PFC CSKA Moscow	23	(4)
1979	FC Chornomorets Odesa	19	(1)
1980–1981	FC Kolos Nikopol	54	(23)
1981–1983	FC Dnipro Dnipropetrovsk	74	(24)
1984	FC Kolos Nikopol	21	(4)

Managerial career
- 1984: FC Kolos Nikopol
- * Club domestic league appearances and goals

Oleksandr Heorhiyovych Pohoryelov (Ukrainian: Олександр Георгійович Погорєлов, Russian: Александр Георгиевич Погорелов, Aleksandr Georgiyevich Pogorelov; born 22 January 1952 in Valuyki; died 17 October 2007 in Odesa) was a Soviet and Ukrainian professional football player and coach.

== Honours ==
- Soviet Top League champion: 1983.
