= Aleksandr Markin (footballer) =

Soviet Russian footballer

Personal information
- Full name: Aleksandr Andreyevich Markin
- Date of birth: 10 October 1949
- Place of birth: Magnitogorsk, Russian SFSR
- Date of death: 2 September 1996 (aged 46)
- Place of death: St. Petersburg, Russia
- Height: 1.80 m (5 ft 11 in)
- Position: Forward

Youth career
- FC Metallurg Magnitogorsk

Senior career*
Years	Team	Apps	(Gls)
1967	FC Metallurg Magnitogorsk		
1968–1970	FC SKA Khabarovsk	83	(16)
1971–1974	FC Zvezda Perm	111	(51)
1975–1977	FC Zenit Leningrad	68	(26)
1978–1979	FC SKA Rostov-on-Don	51	(19)
1980	FC Lokomotiv Chelyabinsk	33	(10)
- * Club domestic league appearances and goals

Aleksandr Andreyevich Markin (Russian: Александр Андреевич Маркин; 10 October 1949 in Magnitogorsk – 2 September 1996 in St. Petersburg in an apartment fire) was a Soviet Russian football player.

He is most notable as the top scorer of the 1976 (autumn) Soviet Top League with 13 goals. He was the first FC Zenit St. Petersburg player to become a top scorer and the only Zenit player to score 4 goals in a league game.

He was also the top scorer in the 1974 season of the Soviet First League with 25 goals.
