= List of people with given name Pyotr =

Russian masculine given name

Pyotr is a Russian given name that is equivalent to the English name Peter.

== A ==
- Pyotr Abrasimov (1912–2009), Soviet war hero and politician
- Pyotr Akhlyustin (1896–1941), Red Army major general
- Pyotr Albedinsky (1826–1883), Russian military officer and politician
- Pyotr Alexeyevich Alexeyev (1849–1891), Russian revolutionary
- Pyotr Andreyanov (born 2007), Russian ice hockey player
- Pyotr Anjou (1796–1869), Imperial Russian Navy admiral and Arctic explorer
- Pyotr Anokhin (1898–1974), Soviet and Russian biologist and physiologist
- Pyotr Avilov (1910–2004), Soviet sports shooter

== B ==
- Pyotr Bagration (1765–1812), Russian general and prince of Georgian origin
- Pyotr Romanovich Bagration (1818–1876), Russian-Georgian statesman, general and scientist
- Pyotr Baluyev (1857–1923), Imperial Russian Army general
- Pyotr Baranov (1892–1933), Soviet military commander and politician
- Pyotr Baranovsky (1892–1984), Russian architect, preservationist, and building restorator
- Pyotr Bardovsky (1846–1886), Russian lawyer and a supporter of independence for Poland
- Pyotr Bark (1869–1937), Russian statesman
- Pyotr Bartenev (1829–1912), Russian historian and collector of unpublished memoirs
- Pyotr Basin (1793–1877), Russian painter
- Pyotr Bazanov (1923–2003), Soviet fighter pilot and flying ace
- Pyotr Z. Bazhbeuk-Melikov (1872–after 1939), ethnic Armenian politician and agronomist in Bessarabia
- Pyotr Beketov (c. 1600–c. 1661), Cossack explorer of Siberia
- Pyotr Berestov (1896–1961), Soviet Red Army major general
- Pyotr Bessonov (1828–1898), Russian folklorist
- Pyotr Bestuzhev-Ryumin (1664–1742), Russian statesman
- Pyotr Bezobrazov (1845–1906), Imperial Russian Navy admiral
- Pyotr Ilyich Bilan (1921–1996), Soviet Russian-Ukrainian painter
- Pyotr Bletkin (1903–1988), Soviet and Georgian painter and graphic artist
- Pyotr Blinov (1913–1942), Soviet Udmurt writer and journalist
- Pyotr Boborykin (1836–1921), Russian writer, playwright, and journalist
- Pyotr Bochek (1925–2018), Soviet Army soldier
- Pyotr Bochkaryov (born 1967), Russian pole vaulter
- Pyotr Bogdanov (1882–1939), Soviet statesman, engineer, and economist
- Pyotr Bolotnikov (1930–2013), Soviet track and field athlete
- Pyotr Borel (1829–1898), Russian painter and illustrator
- Pyotr Borovsky (1863–1932), Russian and Soviet surgeon and public health administrator
- Pyotr Braiko (1919–2018), Soviet soldier
- Pyotr Brayko (born 1977), Russian athlete
- Pyotr Breus (1927–2000), Russian water polo player
- Pyotr Bryanskikh (1896–1938), Soviet corps commander
- Pyotr Bulakhov (1822–1885), Russian composer
- Pyotr Bykov (1844–1930), Russian literary historian, editor, poet, and translator
- Pyotr Bystrov (born 1979), Russian footballer

== C ==
- Pyotr Chaadayev (1794–1856), Russian philosopher
- Pyotr Chardynin (1873–1934), Russian and Soviet film director, screenwriter and actor
- Pyotr Chernyshev (1914–1979), Soviet figure skater and engineer
- Pyotr Aleksandrovich Chicherin (1778–1849), Russian general
- Pyotr Chikhachyov (1808–1890), Russian naturalist and geologist
- Pyotr Yegorovich Chistyakov (1792–1862), Russian explorer and admiral

== D ==
- Pyotr Dementyev (disambiguation)
- Pyotr Demichev (1918–2010), Soviet and Russian politician
- Pyotr Grigoryevich Demidov (1807–1862), Russian nobleman and general
- Pyotr Devyatkin (1977–2016), Kazakhstani ice hockey forward
- Pyotr Deynekin (1937–2017), Russian military general
- Pyotr Dolgorukov (multiple people)
- Pyotr Dmitriyevich Dolgorukov (1866–1951), Russian liberal politician
- Pyotr Vladimirovich Dolgorukov (1816–1868), Russian historian and journalist
- Pyotr Dolgov (1920–1962), Hero of the Soviet Union
- Pyotr Dranga (born 1984), Russian musician
- Pyotr Drozhdin (1745–1805), Russian painter
- Pyotr Dubrov (born 1978), Russian engineer and cosmonaut
- Pyotr Nikolayevich Durnovo (1845–1915), Imperial Russian lawyer, politician, and member of the Russian nobility

== F ==
- Pyotr Fedoseev (1908–1990), Soviet philosopher, sociologist, and politician
- Pyotr Fedotov (1900–1963), Soviet security and intelligence officer
- Pyotr Filatov (1893–1941), Soviet Red Army lieutenant general
- Pyotr Filippov (1893–1965), Russian Soviet football player and coach
- Pyotr Fomenko (1932–2012), Soviet and Russian film and theater director
- Pyotr Frolov (1775–1839), Russian mining engineer and inventor
- Pyotr Fyodorov (born 1982), Russian actor

== G ==
- Pyotr Gannushkin (1875–1933), Russian psychiatrist
- Pyotr Gassiev (born 1972), South Ossetian politician
- Pyotr Gavrilov (1900–1979), Soviet officer
- Pyotr Gitselov (born 1983), Russian-Swedish football player and manager
- Pyotr Glebov (1915–2000), Russian film actor
- Pyotr Gnedich (1855–1925), Russian writer, poet, dramatist, translator, theatre entrepreneur, and art history scholar
- Pyotr Gnido (1919–2006), Soviet fighter pilot
- Pyotr Alexeyevich Golitsyn (1792–1842), Russian prince
- Pyotr Grigorievich Goncharov (1888–1970), Russian and Soviet composer, conductor, and choirmaster
- Pyotr Gora (1922–2002), Soviet colonel of the Ministry of Internal Affairs
- Pyotr Gorchakov (1790–1868), Imperial Russian Army general
- Pyotr Gorelikov (1931–2017), Russian sailor
- Pyotr Gorlov (1839–1915), Russian geologist and engineer
- Pyotr Gornushko (born 1953), Russian equestrian
- Pyotr Grigoryev (1899–1942), Soviet footballer
- Pyotr Grushin (1906–1993), Soviet rocket scientist
- Pyotr Nikolayevich Gruzinsky (1837–1892), Georgian royal prince
- Pyotr Gusev (1904–1987), Russian ballet dancer and choreographer

== I ==
- Pyotr Ilyichev (born 1966), Russian diplomat
- Pyotr Isaev (1890–1919), Russian and Soviet military commander
- Pyotr Ivanovich Isakov (1886–1958), Russian classical guitarist
- Pyotr Isakov (1900–1957), Soviet football player and manager
- Pyotr Ivashutin (1909–2004), Soviet Army General

== K ==
- Pyotr Kachura (born 1972), Belarusian footballer
- Pyotr Kakhovsky (1799–1826), Russian Empire officer
- Pyotr Kapitsa (1894–1984), Soviet physicist, engineer, and Nobel laureate
- Pyotr Kapnist (1839–1904), Russian diplomat and ambassador
- Pyotr Karamushko (colonel) (1908–1998), Soviet Red Army colonel
- Pyotr Karatygin (1805–1879), Russian dramatist and actor
- Pyotr Karyshkovsky (1921–1988), Ukrainian Soviet historian, numismatist, scholar, and lexicographer
- Pyotr Kashchenko (1858–1920), Russian psychiatrist, social and agrarian activist, and author
- Pyotr Khanykov (1743–1813), Imperial Russian Navy admiral
- Pyotr Khrustovsky (1979–2003), Russian footballer
- Pyotr Kikin (1775–1834), Russian general and Secretary of State
- Pyotr Kireevsky (1808–1856), Russian folklorist and philologist
- Pyotr Kirillov (1895–1942), Soviet actor, film director, and screenwriter
- Pyotr Pavlovich Kitkin (1877–1954), Russian military commander
- Pyotr Kleinmichel (1789–1869), Imperial Russian Minister of Transport
- Pyotr Klimuk (born 1942), former Soviet cosmonaut and the first Belarusian to travel in space
- Pyotr Kobozev (1878–1941), Russian revolutionary, Soviet statesman and professor
- Pyotr Kochetkov (born 1999), Russian ice hockey goaltender
- Pyotr Kolbasin (born 1942), Russian actor, director, producer, screenwriter
- Pyotr Kolodin (1930–2021), Soviet cosmonaut
- Pyotr Konchalovsky (1876–1956), Russian painter
- Pyotr Koshel (born 1946), Russian writer, historian, and translator
- Pyotr Koshevoy (1904–1976), Soviet World War II officer and later Marshal of the Soviet Union
- Pyotr Kotlyarevsky (1782–1852), Russian general
- Pyotr Kovalenko (1942–1993), Soviet ski jumper
- Pyotr Kozhevnikov (born 1927), Soviet decathlete
- Pyotr Kozlov (1863–1935), Russian and Soviet traveler and explorer
- Pyotr Kozlovsky (1783–1840), Russian diplomat
- Pyotr Krasikov (1870–1939), Russian revolutionary and Communist Party functionary
- Pyotr Krasilov (born 1977), Russian film and theater actor
- Pyotr Krasnov (1869–1947), Russian historian and officer
- Pyotr Krechetnikov (1727–c. 1800), Russian major-general
- Pyotr Krenitsyn (1728–1770), Russian explorer and Imperial Russian Navy officer
- Pyotr Nikolayevich Kropotkin (1910–1996), Soviet Russian geologist, tectonician, and geophysicist
- Pyotr Kryuchkov (1889–1938), Soviet lawyer
- Pyotr Kudryavtsev (1816–1858), Russian writer and historian
- Pyotr Kuryshko (1894–1921), Soviet Russian military commander
- Pyotr Kuznetsov (born 1964), leader and founder of the True Russian Orthodox Church
- Pyotr Kuznetsov (junior sergeant) (1925–1981), Soviet Red Army junior sergeant during World War II and a Hero of the Soviet Union

== L ==
- Pyotr Latyshev (1948–2008), Russian politician
- Pyotr Lavrov (1823–1900), Russian philosopher, revolutionary, and sociologist
- Pyotr Lebedev (1866–1912), Russian physicist
- Pyotr Leshchenko (1898–1954), singer in the Russian Empire, Romania and later the Soviet Union
- Pyotr Lomako (1904–1990), Soviet politician and economist
- Pyotr Lomnovsky (1871–1956), Russian military commander
- Pyotr Lopukhin (1753–1827), Russian politician
- Pyotr Lushev (1923–1997), Soviet Army general
- Pyotr Lyapin (1894–1954), Soviet Army general
- Pyotr Lyashchenko (1876–1955), Russian economist

== M ==
- Pyotr Makarchuk (born 1972), Russian bobsledder
- Pyotr Malyshev (1898–1972), Soviet Army lieutenant general
- Pyotr Mamonov (1951–2021), Russian rock musician
- Pyotr Manteifel (1882–1960), Soviet zoologist and naturalist
- Pyotr Marchenko (born 1948), Russian politician
- Pyotr Marchenko (journalist) (born 1969), Russian journalist
- Pyotr Marshinskiy (born 1986), Russian footballer
- Pyotr Marta (1952–2023), Soviet freestyle wrestler
- Pyotr Masherov (1919–1980), Soviet partisan, statesman, and World War II Belarusian resistance leader
- Pyotr Melissino (c. 1726–c. 1797), Imperial Russian Army general
- Pyotr Meshchaninov (1944–2006), Russian pianist and conductor
- Pyotr Miklashevich (born 1954), Belarusian politician
- Pyotr Moskatov (1894–1969), Soviet union leader and statesman
- Pyotr Mozharov (1888–1934), Soviet engineer
- Pyotr Mstislavets (fl. 1560s–1570s), Belarusian printer

== N ==
- Pyotr Nechayev (1842–1905), Russian religious writer, journalist, editor, and pedagogue
- Pyotr Nemov (born 1983), Russian footballer
- Pyotr Nesterov (1887–1914), Russian pilot, aircraft designer, and aerobatics pioneer
- Pyotr Nevezhin (1841–1919), Russian dramatist and short story writer
- Pyotr Nikiforov (1882–1974), Russian revolutionary and Soviet politician
- Pyotr Nikolayev (1924–2000), Soviet sports shooter
- Pyotr Nikolsky (1858–1940), Russian dermatologist
- Pyotr Nilus (1869–1943), Russian and Ukrainian impressionist painter and writer
- Pyotr Novikov (1901–1975), Soviet mathematician
- Pyotr Georgyevich Novikov (1907–1944), Soviet Red Army general

== O ==
- Pyotr Oganovsky (1851–c. 1917), Russian general of the infantry
- Pyotr Orlov (1912–1989), Soviet figure skater and pair skating coach
- Pyotr Otsup (1883–1963), Soviet photojournalist

== P ==
- Pyotr Pakhtusov (1800–1835), Russian surveyor and Arctic explorer
- Pyotr Papkov (1772–1853), Russian Generalmajor and statesman
- Pyotr Patrushev (1942–2016), Russian author
- Pyotr Pavlenko (1899–1951), Soviet writer, screenwriter, and war correspondent
- Pyotr Pavlovich Pelehin (1789–1871), Russian physician and teacher
- Pyotr Pertsov (1868–1947), Russian poet, publisher, editor, literary critic, journalist, and memoirist
- Pyotr Petrinich (born 1957), Belarusian rowing cox
- Pyotr Mikhailovich Petrov (1910–1941), Soviet Air Force major, flying ace, and a Hero of the Soviet Union
- Pyotr Petrov (1827–1891), Russian writer, arts historian and critic
- Pyotr Petrovich (multiple people)
- Pyotr Pimashkov (1894–1921), Soviet Russian military commander
- Pyotr Pletnyov (1792–1865), Russian minor poet
- Pyotr Pochynchuk (1954–1991), Soviet athlete
- Pyotr Podgorodetsky (born 1957), Russian musician and showman
- Pyotr Pokryshev (1914–1967), Soviet fighter pilot and squadron commander
- Pyotr Ivanovich Poletika (1778–1849), second Russian ambassador to the United States
- Pyotr Polevoy (1839–1902), Russian writer, playwright, translator, critic, editor, and literary historian
- Pyotr Semyonovich Popov (1923–1960), Soviet military intelligence officer
- Pyotr Popov (born 1985), Russian luger
- Pyotr Pospelov (1898–1979), Soviet Communist Party functionary
- Pyotr Postnikov (1666–1703), Russian diplomat
- Pyotr Potemkin (1617–1700), Russian courtier and diplomat
- Pyotr Prakapovich (born 1942), Belarusian construction engineer, politician, statesman, and bank chairman
- Pyotr Prokopovich (multiple people)
- Pyotr Pshennikov (1895–1941), Soviet general
- Pyotr Pumpur (1900–1942), Latvian-born Soviet Air Forces fighter pilot, Hero of the Soviet Union, and general

== R ==
- Pyotr Rachkovsky (1853–1910), Imperial Russian secret service officer
- Pyotr Ivanovich Ricord (1776–1855), Russian admiral, scientist, diplomat, writer, and shipbuilder
- Pyotr Rumyantsev (1725–1796), Russian general
- Pyotr Ryazanov (1899–1942), Russian composer, teacher, and musicologist

== S ==
- Pyotr Saltykov (c. 1698–1772), Russian statesman and military officer
- Pyotr Schmidt (1867–1906), Sevastopol Uprising leader
- Pyotr Sedunov (born 1977), Russian footballer
- Pyotr Semyonov-Tyan-Shansky (1827–1914), Russian geographer and statistician
- Pyotr Shabelsky-Bork (1893–1952), Russian officer and writer active in far-right and anti-Semitic politics
- Pyotr Shafranov (1901–1972), Soviet Army general
- Pyotr Shamshin (1811–1895), Russian painter of historical and religious scenes
- Pyotr Shchebalsky (1810–1886), Russian literary critic, historian, and author
- Pyotr Shcherbakov (1929–1992), Soviet film and theater actor
- Pyotr Shchetinkin (1884–1927), leader of the Soviet partisan movement in Siberia during the Russian Civil War
- Pyotr Shchukin (1853–1912), Russian art collector
- Pyotr Shchurovsky (1850–1908), Ukrainian composer
- Pyotr Shelepov (1920–1983), Soviet Red Army soldier and Hero of the Soviet Union
- Pyotr Sheremetev (1713–1788), Russian nobleman and courtier
- Pyotr Shilovsky (1872–1955), Russian count, jurist, statesman, and governor
- Pyotr Shirshov (1905–1953), Soviet oceanographer, hydrobiologist, polar explorer, statesman, and academician
- Pyotr Ivanovich Sholokhov (1898−1988), Russian realist artist
- Pyotr Shubin (born 1944), Russian professional footballer and coach
- Pyotr Andreyevich Shuvalov (1827–1889), Russian statesman
- Pyotr Skripchenkov (1926–2010), Russian swimmer
- Pyotr Slovtsov (1886–1934), Russian tenor
- Pyotr Smidovich (1874–1935), Russian revolutionary and Soviet politician
- Pyotr Arsenievich Smirnov (1831–1898), Russian businessman, founder of the Smirnov vodka company
- Pyotr Smirnov (1897–1939), Soviet Commissar, Deputy Minister of Defence and Commander of the Soviet Navy
- Pyotr Smorodin (1897–1939), Soviet politician
- Pyotr Sobennikov (1894–1960), Soviet general
- Pyotr Sobolevsky (1904–1977), Soviet actor
- Pyotr Sokolov (disambiguation)
- Pyotr Solodukhin (1892–1920), Russian Bolshevik division commander in the Russian Civil War
- Pyotr Sorokin (1889–1942), Russian footballer
- Pyotr Starkovsky (1884–1964), Russian actor
- Pyotr Stefanovsky (1903–1976), Soviet test pilot
- Pyotr Stepanov (born 1959), Transnistrian politician
- Pyotr Stepanov (actor) (1800–1869), Russian stage actor
- Pyotr Stolyarsky (1871–1944), Soviet violinist
- Pyotr Stolypin (1862–1911), Russian politician and statesman
- Pyotr Subbotin-Permyak (1886–1923), Russian avant-garde painter
- Pyotr Sumin (1946–2011), governor of Chelyabinsk Oblast of Russia
- Pyotr Suvchinsky (1892–1985), Russian artistic patron and writer on music
- Pyotr Sviatopolk-Mirsky (1857–1914), Russian general, politician, and police official

== T ==
- Pyotr Tayozhny (1887–1952), Russian sculptor
- Pyotr Ilyich Tchaikovsky (1840–1893), Russian composer
- Pyotr Telezhnikov (born 1863), Imperial Russian division, corps and army commander
- Pyotr Ten (born 1992), Russian footballer
- Pyotr Genrikhovich Tiedemann (1872–1941), Russian nobleman and diplomat
- Pyotr Tkachev (1844–1886), Russian writer, critic, and revolutionary theorist
- Pyotr Nikolayevich Toburokov (1917–2001), Russian poet and writer
- Pyotr Tochilin (born 1974), Russian film director and screenwriter
- Pyotr Todorovsky (1925–2013), Russian film director, screenwriter, and cinematographer
- Pyotr Tolstikhin (1927–2002), Russian sailor
- Pyotr Tolstoy (multiple people)
- Pyotr Aleksandrovich Tolstoy (1769–1844), Russian general and statesman
- Pyotr Andreyevich Tolstoy (1645–1729), Russian statesman and diplomat
- Pyotr Olegovich Tolstoy (born 1969), Russian journalist, producer, presenter, and politician
- Pyotr Trusov (born 1948), Russian physicist

== U ==
- Pyotr Ufimtsev (born 1931), Soviet/Russian physicist and mathematician
- Pyotr Lavrentyevich Ulyanov (1928–2006), Russian mathematician
- Pyotr Ustinov (born 1987), Russian footballer

== V ==
- Pyotr Vail (1949–2009), Russian author, journalist, and essayist
- Pyotr Valuyev (1815–1890), Russian statesman and writer
- Pyotr Vannovsky (1822−1904), Russian general and politician
- Pyotr Vasilevsky (1956–2012), Belarusian footballer and manager
- Pyotr Veinberg (1831–1908), Russian poet, translator, journalist, and literary historian
- Pyotr Velyaminov (1926–2009), Soviet Russian film and theater actor
- Pyotr Vereshchagin (1834/36–1886), Russian landscape and cityscape painter
- Pyotr Vershigora (1905–1963), leader Soviet partisan movement in Ukraine, Belarus and Poland, and later a writer
- Pyotr Verzilov (born 1987), Russian-Canadian artist and activist
- Pyotr Volkonsky (1776–1852), Imperial Russian military commander
- Pyotr Volodkin (born 1999), Russian footballer
- Pyotr Vologodsky (1863–1925), Russian statesman, public figure, and mason
- Pyotr Vorobyov (born 1949), Russian ice hockey player and coach
- Pyotr Voykov (1888–1927), Ukrainian Bolshevik revolutionary and Soviet diplomat
- Pyotr Vtorov (1938–1979), Soviet scientist biogeographer, ecologist, zoologist, and nature conservation activist
- Pyotr Vyazemsky (1792–1878), Russian Imperial poet

== W ==
- Pyotr Wrangel (1878–1928), Russian officer of Baltic German origin in the Imperial Russian Army

== Y ==
- Pyotr Yakir (1923–1982), Soviet historian
- Pyotr Yakubovich (1860–1911), Russian revolutionary, poet, and politician
- Pyotr Yefremov (1830–1908), Russian literary historian, publisher, editor and essayist
- Pyotr Yeropkin (c. 1698–1740), Russian architect
- Pyotr Yershov (disambiguation)
- Pyotr Mikhaylovich Yershov (1910–1994), Soviet theater director and art theoretician
- Pyotr Pavlovich Yershov (1815–1869), Russian poet
- Pyotr Yeryomin (born 1992), Russian professional ice hockey goaltender
- Pyotr Yezhov (1900–1975), Soviet footballer and manager

== Z ==
- Pyotr Zakharov (born 1979), Russian professional bandy player
- Pyotr Zakharov-Chechenets (1816–1846), Chechen-Russian painter
- Pyotr Zalutsky (1887–1937), Russian Bolshevik revolutionary and Communist Party organiser
- Pyotr Zavadovsky (1739–1812), Russian statesman
- Pyotr Zaychenko (1943–2019), Soviet-born Russian film and theater actor
- Pyotr Zayev (1953−2014), Russian heavyweight boxer
- Pyotr Zgursky (born 2001), Belarusian professional footballer
- Pyotr Zinchenko (1903–1969), Soviet developmental psychologist
- Pyotr Zubrov (1822–1873), Russian stage actor
- Pyotr Zykov (1890–1960), Soviet Red Army major general

== See also ==
- List of people named Piotr
