= Soviet Union national football team results (unofficial matches) =

The Soviet Union national football team represented the Soviet Union in international association football under the control of the Football Federation of the Soviet Union. From its establishment the Soviet Union remained in political blockade and to break it, it created its own international sports organization Red Sport International (RSI) that was part of the Comintern. It was not until 1950s when the Football Federation of the Soviet Union was finally admitted to FIFA (1946) and later UEFA (1954).

The Soviet Union played its first official international against Turkey on 16 November 1924 at the imeni Vorovskogo sports field in Moscow, winning the match 3–0. In 1925 the football team toured Turkey. Following admission of the Weimar Republic to the League of Nations, in 1926 and 1927 on invitation of the Arbeiter-Turn- und Sportbund the Soviet Union was touring Germany. In 1930 fighting the political blockade, the AIF Workers Federation of Sports gave invitation to the Soviet Union to tour Scandinavia.

The Soviet squad has participated in seven World Cups (1958, 1962, 1966, 1970, 1982, 1986 and 1990) and six European Championship (1960, 1964, 1968, 1972, 1988 and 1992 – latter as CIS national football team). Also, the Soviet squad managed to reach finals in four UEFA European Championships.

== 1920s ==
=== 1924 ===
| 8 September 1924 Friendly | Soviet Union | 0–1 | (Ukrainian Soviet Socialist Republic) Ukraine | Moscow, Soviet Union |
| | | Report | Natarov 37' | Stadium: Krasnaya Presnia; Attendance: 8,000; Referee: Georgiy Feponov (Leningrad, Soviet Union) |

=== 1925 ===
| 22 April 1925 Friendly | Soviet Union | 3–2 | Moscow | Moscow, Soviet Union |
| | Butusov 16', 53'; Kanunnikov 20' | Report | ?; ? | Stadium: Krasnaya Presnia; Attendance: 15,000; Referee: ? |

| 26 April 1925 Friendly | Kharkiv | 1–7 | Soviet Union | Kharkiv, Soviet Union |
| | ? | Report | Isakov (?); Butusov (?); Kanunnikov (?) | Stadium: Spartak; Attendance: 6,000; Referee: Ivan Savostianov (Moscow) |

| 2 May 1925 Friendly | Odesa-2 | 0–0 | Soviet Union | Odesa, Soviet Union |
| | | Report | | Stadium: Mestran; Attendance: 5,000; Referee: Ivan Savostianov (Moscow) |

| 3 May 1925 Friendly | Odesa | 1–4 | Soviet Union | Odesa, Soviet Union |
| | ? | Report | Grigoryev (?); Butusov (?); Isakov (?); Kanunnikov (?) | Stadium: Mestran; Attendance: 5,000; Referee: Ivan Savostianov (Moscow) |

| 6 May 1925 Friendly | Odesa | 0–6 | Soviet Union | Odesa, Soviet Union |
| | | Report | Butusov (?); Isakov (?); Grigoryev (?); Shaposhnikov (?) | Stadium: Mestran; Attendance: 5,000; Referee: Ivan Savostianov (Moscow) |

| 13 May 1925 Friendly | Turkey | 1–6 | Soviet Union | Ankara, Turkey |
| | Vahap (?) | Report | Selin 15'; Grigoryev 32'; Artemyev 51'; Butusov 59', 89'; Shaposhnikov 68' | Stadium: İstiklal; Attendance: 2,000; Referee: Çap Hamdi Emin (Istambul, Turkey) |

| 22 May 1925 Friendly | Constantinople (Ottoman Empire) | 2–2 | Soviet Union | Istanbul, Turkey |
| | ?; ? | Report | Isakov 35'; Butusov 89' | Stadium: Taksim Stadium; Attendance: 4,000 |

| 24 May 1925 Friendly | Constantinople (Ottoman Empire) | 0–3 | Soviet Union | Istanbul, Turkey |
| | | Report | Butusov 36', 90'; Isakov 83' | Stadium: Taksim Stadium; Attendance: 3,000; Referee: Ivan Sevastianov (Moscow) |

| 30 May 1925 Friendly | Odessa Governorate (Ukrainian Soviet Socialist Republic) | 0–1 | Soviet Union | Odesa, Soviet Union |
| | | Report | Butusov 50' | Stadium: Kanatchikov; Attendance: 5,000; Referee: Ivan Sevastianov (Moscow) |

| 31 May 1925 Friendly | Odessa Governorate (Ukrainian Soviet Socialist Republic) | 3–8 | Soviet Union | Odesa, Soviet Union |
| | Halperin (?); Zlochevskiy (?); Polehenkyi (?) | Report | Isakov (?); Grigoryev (?); Kanunnikov (?); Butusov (?); Shaposhnikov (?) | Stadium: Kanatchikov; Attendance: 5,000; Referee: Lenskiy (Odesa) |

| 7 June 1925 Friendly | Soviet Union | 2–1 | Moscow | Moscow, Soviet Union |
| | Artemyev (?); Kanunnikov (?) | Report | Starostin (?) | Stadium: OPPV; Attendance: 5,000; Referee: Ivan Sevastianov (Moscow) |

=== 1926 ===
| 18 July 1926 Friendly | Soviet Union | 3–1 | (Russian Soviet Federative Socialist Republic) RSFSR |
| | | Report |

| 22 July 1925 Friendly | Leipzig | 2–5 | Soviet Union |
| | | Report |

| 24 July 1926 Friendly | Chemnitz | 2–7 | Soviet Union |
| | | Report |

| 25 July 1926 Friendly | Dresden | 1–10 | Soviet Union |
| | | Report |

| 31 July 1926 Friendly | Stuttgart | 1–9 | Soviet Union |
| | | Report |

| 2 August 1926 Friendly | Heilbronn (Germany) | 1–14 | Soviet Union |
| | | Report |

| 7 August 1926 Friendly | Frankfurt | 2–7 | Soviet Union |
| | | Report |

| 8 August 1926 Friendly | Cologne | 2–12 | Soviet Union |
| | | Report |

| 14 August 1926 Friendly | Strādnieku sporta savienība (Latvia) | 0–12 | Soviet Union |
| | | Report |

| 16 August 1926 Friendly | VIVO Budapest (Hungary) | 0–8 | Soviet Union |
| | | Report |

| 21 August 1926 Friendly | Soviet Union | 2–3 | (Russian Soviet Federative Socialist Republic) RSFSR |
| | | Report |

| 22 August 1926 Friendly | Armed Forces (Soviet Union) | 3–3 | Soviet Union |
| | | Report |

=== 1927 ===
| 26 June 1927 Friendly | Soviet Union | 3–2 | Moscow |
| | | Report |

| 2 July 1927 Friendly | ATSB (Germany) | 2–8 | Soviet Union |
| | | Report |

| 10 July 1927 Friendly | ATSB (Germany) | 1–4 | Soviet Union |
| | | Report |

| 13 July 1927 Friendly | Nordwest (Germany) | 2–8 | Soviet Union |
| | | Report |

| 15 July 1927 Friendly | Dresdner SV 10 (Germany) | 0–3 | Soviet Union |
| | | Report |

| 20 July 1927 Friendly | Chemnitz | 0–8 | Soviet Union |
| | | Report |

| 22 July 1927 Friendly | Baden-Pfalz (Germany) | 2–12 | Soviet Union |
| | | Report |

| 24 July 1927 Friendly | Rhineland-Westfalen (Germany) | 1–5 | Soviet Union |
| | | Report |

| 27 July 1927 Friendly | Vienna | 3–1 | Soviet Union |
| | | Report |

| 29 July 1927 Friendly | Vienna | 1–6 | Soviet Union |
| | | Report |

| 30 July 1927 Friendly | Berlin | 2–6 | Soviet Union |
| | | Report |

| 5 August 1927 Friendly | Strādnieku sporta savienība (Latvia) | 1–5 | Soviet Union |
| | | Report |

| 7 August 1927 Friendly | Strādnieku sporta savienība (Latvia) | 0–5 | Soviet Union |
| | | Report |

| 8 August 1927 Friendly | Dinamo Sebezh (Soviet Union) | 1–16 | Soviet Union |
| | | Report |

| 10 August 1927 Friendly | Soviet Union | 1–1 | Moscow |
| | | Report |

== 1930s ==
=== 1930 ===
| 21 September 1930 Friendly | Soviet Union | 4–1 | Moscow |
| | | Report |

| 23 September 1930 Friendly | Leningrad (Leningrad Oblast) | 1–1 | Soviet Union |
| | | Report |

| 28 September 1930 Friendly | AIF (Norway) | 0–4 | Soviet Union |
| | | Report |

| 30 September 1930 Friendly | SK Sprint Moss (Norway) | 1–2 | Soviet Union |
| | | Report |

| 5 October 1930 Friendly | Sarpsborg FK (Norway) | 5–13 | Soviet Union |
| | | Report |

| 8 October 1930 Friendly | AIF (Norway) | 1–4 | Soviet Union |
| | | Report |

| 11 October 1930 Friendly | AIF (Sweden) | 1–16 | Soviet Union |
| | | Report |

| 14 October 1930 Friendly | Leningrad (Leningrad Oblast) | 1–5 | Soviet Union |
| | | Report |

| 18 October 1930 Friendly | Soviet Union | 3–2 | (Russian Soviet Federative Socialist Republic) RSFSR |
| | | Report |

=== 1931 ===
| 18 June 1931 RSI Spartakiade in Berlin qualification | Soviet Union | 0–2 | Moscow |
| | | Report |

| 20 August 1931 Friendly | Soviet Union | 3–2 | Turkey |
| | | Report |

| 14 October 1931 Friendly | Soviet Union | 1–3 | (Soviet Union) USSR-2 |
| | | Report |

=== 1932 ===
| 15 July 1932 Friendly | Soviet Union | 3–4 | Moscow |
| | | Report |

| 21 July 1932 Friendly | Soviet Union | 1–2 | (Soviet Union) USSR-2 |
| | | Report |

| 8 September 1932 Friendly | Soviet Union | 3–3 | Moscow |
| | | Report |

| 30 September 1932 Friendly | Soviet Union | 3–2 | (Germany) ATSB |
| | | Report |

| 10 October 1932 Friendly | Soviet Union | 1–2 | Moscow |
| | | Report |

| 21 October 1932 Friendly | Turkey | 2–2 | Soviet Union |
| | | Report |

| 23 October 1932 Friendly | Turkey | 0–4 | Soviet Union |
| | | Report |

| 27 October 1932 Friendly | Turkey | 0–1 | Soviet Union |
| | | Report |

| 30 October 1932 Friendly | Turkey | 2–3 | Soviet Union |
| | | Report |

| 5 November 1932 Friendly | Odesa | 1–2 | Soviet Union |
| | | Report |

| 6 November 1932 Friendly | Odesa Oblast | 0–3 | Soviet Union |
| | | Report |

=== 1933 ===
| 14 July 1933 Friendly | Soviet Union | 0–2 | (Soviet Union) USSR-2 |
| | | Report |

| 30 July 1933 Friendly | Soviet Union | 1–2 | Turkey |
| | | Report |

| 2 September 1933 Friendly | Leningrad (Leningrad Oblast) | 3–4 | Soviet Union |
| | | Report |

=== 1934 ===
| 14 July 1934 Friendly | Soviet Union | 9–1 | (Soviet Union) Dinamo Rostov-na-Donu |
| | | Report |

| 29 July 1934 Friendly | Soviet Union | 5–0 | (Dnipro) Dnipropetrovsk |
| | | Report |

| 4 August 1934 Friendly | Soviet Union | 6–4 | (Soviet Union) Trudovaya Kommuna Bolshevo |
| | | Report |

| 7 August 1934 Friendly | Soviet Union | 2–1 | Turkey |
| | | Report |

=== 1935 ===
| 26 September 1935 Friendly | Soviet Union | 0–1 | (Soviet Union) USSR-2 |
| | | Report |

| 29 September 1935 Friendly | Soviet Union | 3–4 | (Soviet Union) USSR-2 |
| | | Report |

| 5 October 1935 Friendly | Soviet Union | 3–1 | (Soviet Union) CDKA Moscow |
| | | Report |

| 13 October 1935 Friendly | Turkey | 1–2 | Soviet Union |
| | | Report |

| 15 October 1935 Friendly | Turkey | 2–2 | Soviet Union |
| | | Report |

| 19 October 1935 Friendly | Turkey | 3–3 | Soviet Union |
| | | Report |

| 21 October 1935 Friendly | Turkey | 2–3 | Soviet Union |
| | | Report |

| 25 October 1935 Friendly | Turkey | 1–2 | Soviet Union |
| | | Report |

| 27 October 1935 Friendly | Turkey | 3–3 | Soviet Union |
| | | Report |

| 8 November 1935 Friendly | Odesa | 0–0 | Soviet Union |
| | | Report |

== 1950's ==
=== 1952 ===
Before participating in the Helsinki Olympic Games, the Soviet Union played nine matches under different names. Soviet Union played 9 matches under different names in 1952:

| 11 May 1952 | Moscow Team | 0–1 | Poland | Moscow |
| | | Report | Cieślik | Stadium: Central Dynamo Stadium; Attendance: 55,000 |

| 14 May 1952 | Moscow Team | 2–1 | Poland | Moscow |
| | Bobrov | Report | Cieślik | Stadium: Central Dynamo Stadium; Attendance: 55,000 |

| 24 May 1952 | Moscow Team | 1–1 | Hungary | Moscow |
| | Bobrov | Report | Palotás | Stadium: Central Dynamo Stadium; Attendance: 60,000 |

| 27 May 1952 | Moscow Team | 2–1 | Hungary | Moscow |
| | Nikolayev; Ilyin | Report | Puskás | Stadium: Central Dynamo Stadium; Attendance: 60,000 |

| 11 June 1952 | CDSA | 2–2 | Sofia Team | Moscow |
| | Trofimov; Beskov | Report | Yanev; Argirov | Stadium: Central Dynamo Stadium; Attendance: 55,000 |

| 18 June 1952 | CDSA | 2–1 | Sofia Team | Moscow |
| | Nikolayev; Trofimov | Report | Yanev; Argirov | Stadium: Central Dynamo Stadium; Attendance: 50,000 |

| 24 June 1952 | CDSA | 3–1 | Romania | Moscow |
| | Ilyin; Nikolayev | Report | Bodo | Stadium: Central Dynamo Stadium; Attendance: 50,000 |

| 29 June 1952 | Finland XI | 0–2 | CDSA | Helsinki |
| | | | Bobrov | Stadium: Olympic Stadium; Attendance: 24,527 |

| 7 July 1952 | CDSA | 2–1 | Czechoslovakia | Moscow |
| | Bobrov; Tenyagin | Report | Jakubcik | Stadium: Central Dynamo Stadium; Attendance: 50,000 |

=== 1954 ===
| 19 September 1954 Friendly | Leningrad (Leningrad Oblast) | 1–1 | Soviet Union |
| | Bobrov (?) | Report |

=== 1955 ===
| 26 January 1955 Friendly | Athletic Association (India) | 0–7 | Soviet Union |
| | | Report |

| 28 January 1955 Friendly | India | 0–4 | Soviet Union |
| | | Report |

| 29 January 1955 Friendly | Uttar Pradesh (India) | 0–9 | Soviet Union |
| | | Report |

| 2 February 1955 Friendly | Armed Forces (India) | 0–4 | Soviet Union |
| | | Report |

| 5 February 1955 Friendly | Deli (India) | 0–9 | Soviet Union |
| | | Report |

| 6 February 1955 Friendly | India | 0–4 | Soviet Union |
| | | Report |

| 9 February 1955 Friendly | India | 2–5 | Soviet Union |
| | | Report |

| 12 February 1955 Friendly | Madras State (India) | 1–6 | Soviet Union |
| | | Report |

| 13 February 1955 Friendly | South India | 0–8 | Soviet Union |
| | | Report |

| 16 February 1955 Friendly | India | 0–11 | Soviet Union |
| | | Report |

| 19 February 1955 Friendly | Mysore State (India) | 1–7 | Soviet Union |
| | | Report |

| 20 February 1955 Friendly | India-B | 0–2 | Soviet Union |
| | | Report |

| 23 February 1955 Friendly | Hyderabad State (India) | 0–5 | Soviet Union |
| | | Report |

| 24 February 1955 Friendly | India | 0–6 | Soviet Union |
| | | Report |

| 26 February 1955 Friendly | Bombay State (India) | 0–1 | Soviet Union |
| | | Report |

| 29 February 1955 Friendly | India | 0–3 | Soviet Union |
| | | Report |

| 3 March 1955 Friendly | Mohun Bagan (India) | 0–3 | Soviet Union |
| | | Report |

| 5 March 1955 Friendly | East Bengal (India) | 0–3 | Soviet Union |
| | | Report |

| 6 March 1955 Friendly | India | 0–3 | Soviet Union |
| | | Report |

| 24 July 1955 Friendly | Soviet Union | 1–1 | (Soviet Union) USSR-2 |
| | | Report |

=== 1956 ===
| 5 November 1956 Friendly | Pakhtakor Tashkent (Soviet Union) | 1–11 | Soviet Union |
| | | Report |

| 15 November 1956 Friendly | Australia | 1–15 | Soviet Union |
| | | Report |

=== 1957 ===
| 28 July 1957 3rd Friendship Games – Group stage | Soviet Union | 6–1 | Sudan |
| | | Report |

| 31 July 1957 3rd Friendship Games – Group stage | Soviet Union | 6–1 | Indonesia |
| | | Report |

| 2 August 1957 3rd Friendship Games – Group stage | Soviet Union | 4–1 | Austria |
| | | Report |

| 4 August 1957 3rd Friendship Games – Quarterfinals | Soviet Union | 6–0 | China |
| | | Report |

| 6 August 1957 3rd Friendship Games – Semifinals | Soviet Union | 4–3 (a.e.t.) | Czechoslovakia |
| | | Report |

| 10 August 1957 3rd Friendship Games – Final | Soviet Union | 5–1 | Hungary |
| | | Report |

=== 1958 ===
| 15 February 1958 Friendly | Changchun (China) | 0–4 | Soviet Union |
| | | Report |

| 16 February 1958 Friendly | Shenyang Institute of Physical Education (China) | 0–5 | Soviet Union |
| | | Report |

| 21 February 1958 Friendly | Beijing (China) | 1–1 | Soviet Union |
| | | Report |

| 22 February 1958 Friendly | August 1st (China) | 1–1 | Soviet Union |
| | | Report |

| 27 February 1958 Friendly | Red Flag (China) | 1–12 | Soviet Union |
| | | Report |

| 28 February 1958 Friendly | Shanghai Red Team (China) | 0–7 | Soviet Union |
| | | Report |

| 5 March 1958 Friendly | Shenyang Army Unit (China) | 0–11 | Soviet Union |
| | | Report |

| 7 March 1958 Friendly | 1st Ministry Machine Building (China) | 0–5 | Soviet Union |
| | | Report |

| 12 March 1958 Friendly | August 1st (China) | 0–3 | Soviet Union |
| | | Report |

| 13 March 1958 Friendly | Beijing (China) | 1–2 | Soviet Union |
| | | Report |

| 7 May 1958 Friendly | Soviet Union | 4–1 | Soviet Union (youth) |
| | | Report |

| 17 October 1958 Friendly | Volga Kalinin (Soviet Union) | 1–1 | Soviet Union |
| | | Report |
