= Bazhanov =

Bazhanov (masculine, Russian: Бажанов) or Bazhanova (feminine, Russian: Бажанова), sometimes transliterated as Bajanov, is a Russian surname. Notable people with the surname include:

- Boris Bazhanov (1900–1983), personal secretary of Joseph Stalin
- Evgeny P. Bazhanov (born 1946), Russian political scientist and historian
- Natalia E. Bazhanova (1947–2014), Russian political scientist
- Svetlana Bazhanova (born 1972), Russian speed skater
- Valentin A. Bazhanov (born 1953), Russian philosopher

== See also ==
- Bazanov
- Bazhanov coal mine, coal mine in Ukraine
