= Aleksei Goncharov =

Aleksei Goncharov may refer to:

- Aleksei Goncharov (chess player) (1879–1913), Russian chess player
- Aleksei Goncharov (footballer) (born 1988), Russian footballer
- Alexei Goncearov (born 1984), Moldovan footballer
