= Goncharov =

Goncharov (Russian: Гончаров), feminine: Goncharova (Russian: Гончарова), is an occupational Russian surname derived from the Russian word gonchar meaning potter.

Belarusian people with the Belarusian-language surname Hancharou may also use the Russian spelling, because Russian is the second official language in Belarus.

Notable people with the surname include:

- Alexander Goncharov (born 1960), Soviet-American mathematician
- Aleksandr Goncharov (1959–1990), Soviet Russian hockey player
- Aleksandra Goncharova (actress) (1888–1969), Russian film actress
- Aleksandra Goncharova (cyclist) (born 1992), Russian road and track cyclist
- Aleksei Fyodorovich Goncharov (1879–1913), Russian chess master
- Aleksei Vladimirovich Goncharov (born 1988), Russian footballer
- Anastasiia Goncharova (fl. from 2025), Russian Paralympian swimmer.
- Andrey Goncharov (1918–2001), Soviet and Russian theater director, pedagogue and author
- Dmitri Goncharov (born 1975), Russian footballer
- Evgeniy Goncharov (born 1986), Russian mixed martial artist
- Georgy Goncharov (fl. 1930s), Russian expatriate dancer
- German Goncharov (1928–2009), Russian physicist
- Ivan Goncharov (1812–1891), Russian author
- Margarita Goncharova (born 1991), Russian Paralympian sprinter
- Marina Goncharova (born 1986), Russian heptathlete
- Maxim Goncharov (born 1989), Russian professional ice hockey player
- Natalia Goncharova (1881–1962), Russian Cubo-Futurism painter
- Natalia Goncharova (diver) (born 1985), Russian diver
- Natalya Goncharova (fencer) (born 1974), Kazakhstani fencer
- Nataliya Goncharova (volleyball) (born 1989), Russian volleyball player
- Natalia Pushkina née Goncharova, wife of poet Alexander Pushkin
- Natalia Gontcharova (handballer) (born 1972), Russian handball world champion
- Nikolay Goncharov (born 1984), Russian politician
- Pyotr Grigorievich Goncharov (1888–1970), Russian composer
- Sofia Goncharova (born 1981), Russian compound archer
- Stanislav Goncharov (born 1983), Russian footballer
- Valentyna Honcharova (born 1990), Ukrainian sport shooter
- Valeriya Goncharova (born 1988), Russian volleyball player.
- Vasily Goncharov (1861–1915), Russian film director and screenwriter
- Viktor Goncharov (born 1976), Russian footballer
- Yelena Tyushnyakova née Goncharova (born 1963), Russian speed skater and ice hockey player

== See also ==
- Goncharova, crater on Venus
- Goncharov (meme), fictitious mafia film
