= Otsup =

Otsup is a surname. Notable people with the surname include:

- Ludmilla Chiriaeff (née Otsup; 1924–1996), Latvian-Canadian ballet dancer, choreographer, teacher, and company director
- Pyotr Otsup (1883–1963), Soviet photographer
