= Honcharov =

Honcharov, feminine: Honcharova is a Ukrainian occupational surname. Russian equivalent, Goncharov/Goncharova; Belarusian: Hancharou/Hancharova. Notable people with the surname include:

- Iryna Honcharova (born 1990), Ukrainian sports shooter
- Ruslan Honcharov (born 1973), Ukrainian figure skater
- Valentyna Honcharova (born 1974), Ukrainian sports shooter
- Valeriy Honcharov (born 1977), Ukrainian gymnast
