= Blinkov =

Blinkov (Russian: Блинков) is a Russian masculine surname; its feminine counterpart is Blinkova. The surname may refer to the following notable people:

- Anna Blinkova (born 1998), Russian tennis player
- Vsevolod Blinkov (1918–1987), Russian football player and manager

== See also ==
- Blinov
