= Kanunnikov =

Kanunnikov (Russian: Кану́нников) is a Russian surname that may refer to:

- Boris Kanunnikov, lead guitarist of Umka and Bronevik
- Maksim Kanunnikov (born 1991), Russian footballer
- Oleg Kanunnikov (1964–2007), radio operator killed in the TransAVIAexport Airlines Il-76 crash in Mogadishu, 2007
- Pavel Kanunnikov (1898–1974), Soviet footballer
