= Aleksei Shaposhnikov =

Aleksei Shaposhnikov may refer to:

- Aleksei Shaposhnikov (footballer), Soviet footballer (1899–1962)
- Aleksei Shaposhnikov (politician), Russian politician (born 1973)
