= Bazanov =

Bazanov (masculine, Russian: Базанов) or Bazanova (feminine, Russian: Базанова) is a Russian surname. Notable people with the surname include:

- Aleksei Bazanov (born 1986), Russian footballer
- Pyotr Bazanov (1923–2003), flying ace

== See also ==
- Bazhanov
