= Pavel Novgorodtsev =

Russian lawyer and philosopher

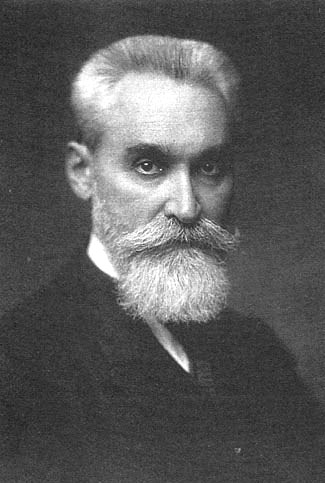
Pavel Novgorodtsev

Pavel Ivanovich Novgorodtsev (Russian: Па́вел Ива́нович Новгоро́дцев; 28 February [O.S. 16 February] 1866 – 23 April 1924 in Prague) was a Russian lawyer and philosopher.

== Life and work ==
Novgorodtsev was born on 28 February [O.S. 16 February] 1866 in Bakhmut. He graduated from Moscow University in 1888 with a degree in law. Following further study in Berlin and Paris he returned to Moscow University, completing his doctorate in 1903. from 1896 to 1911. He was a member of the Central Committee Constitutional Democrat Party (Kadets) and in 1906 he was elected as a deputy to the First State Duma. He was a signatory of the Vyborg Manifesto. He was also appointed director and a professor at the Moscow Commercial Institute that year. Ivan Ilyin was one of his protégés.

During the First World War he worked with the Union of Cities and was the Moscow Commissioner of the Special Meeting on Fuel.

During the Russian Civil War he sided with the Whites, 1918 and left the Crimea in 1920. After living in Berlin in 1922–1924, he moved to Prague where, shortly before his death, became Dean of the Russian faculty of law at the Charles University there.

Novgorodtsev died in Prague on 23 April 1924. He is buried at the Orthodox section of Prague's Olšany Cemetery.

== Views ==
In 1903, he edited Problems of Idealism which included his essay "Нравственный идеализм в философии права" (Moral idealism in the philosophy of law). Novgorodtsev was a Neo-Kantian and considered natural law as providing a moral criterion for criticising and improving positive law. In The Crisis of Modern Legal Consciousness (1911), he declared that all ideas for resolving modern social and moral contradictions were Utopian. He criticised the theory of scientific socialism, and viewed all proposals for resolving modern social and moral contradictions as Utopian.

== Works ==
- Istoricheskaia shkola iuristov: Ee proiskhozhdenie i sud'ba, Moscow, 1896
- Kant i Gegel' v ikh uchenii o prave i gosudarstve, ("Kant and Hegel in his Theories of Law and the State: Two Typical Lines in the Field of Law Philosophy") Moscow, 1901
- The Crisis of Modern Legal Consciousness, 1911
