= Hancharou =

Hancharou (Belarusian: Ганчароў), feminine: Hancharova (Belarusian: Ганчарова), is an occupational Belarusian surname. Notable people with the surname include:

- Hanna Hancharova, (born 1992), Belarusian individual and synchronized trampoline gymnast
- Maryna Hancharova (born 1990), Belarusian rhythmic gymnast
- Uladzislau Hancharou (born 1995), Belarusian trampoline gymnast

== See also ==
- Goncharov. Russian equivalent
- Honcharov, Ukrainian equivalent
