= Vyborg Manifesto =

1906 Russian proclamation

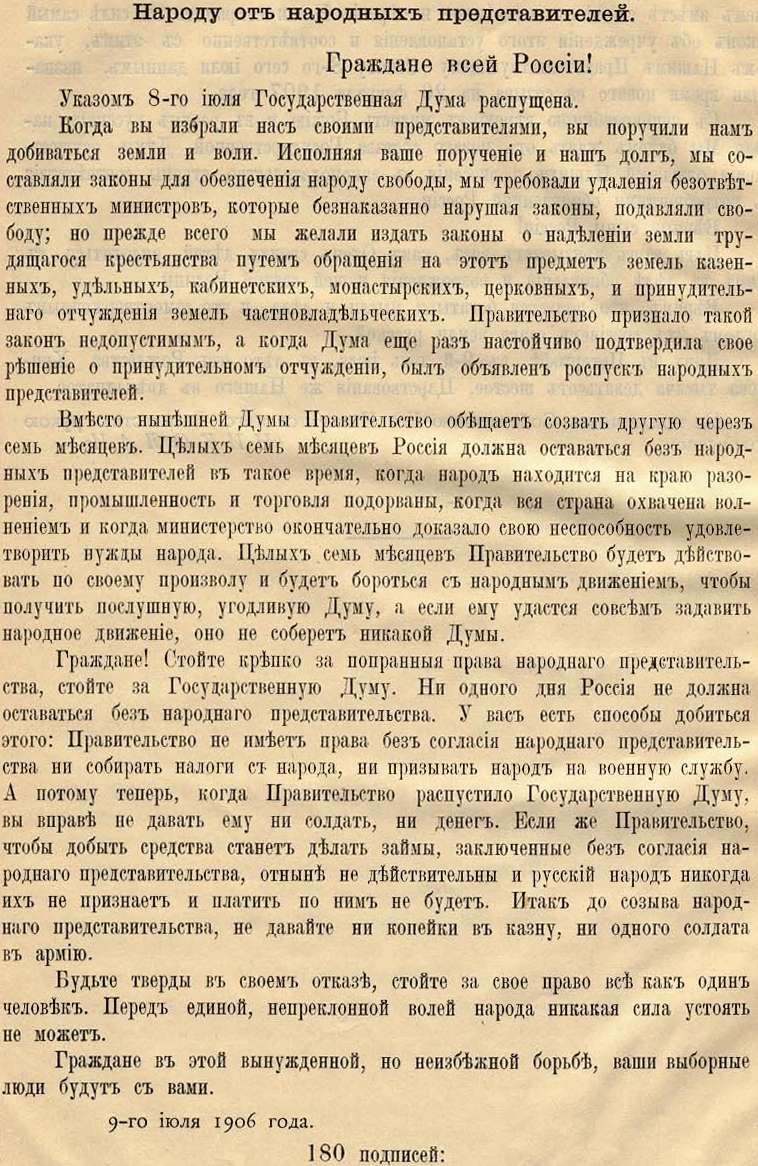
A copy of the original transcript of the 'Vyborg Appeal'.

The "Vyborg Manifesto" (Russian: Выборгское воззвание, romanized: Vyborgskoye Vozzvaniye, Finnish: Viipurin manifesti, Swedish: Viborgsmanifestet; also called the "Vyborg Appeal") was a proclamation signed by several Russian politicians (primarily Kadets and Trudoviks) of the dissolved First Duma on 22 July [O.S. 9 July] 1906.

In the wake of the 1905 Revolution, Russia's first modern parliament, the State Duma, was convoked. It rapidly became a voice of radicalism and liberalism, and was subsequently dissolved by the Tsarist government 72 days after convocation. Outraged, several members of the first Duma traveled to Vyborg in the autonomous Grand Duchy of Finland, where they signed a 'manifesto' calling for 'passive resistance', which included evading taxes and defying conscription orders.

The manifesto was met with 'universal indifference', which allowed the Tsarist authorities to silence the manifesto's contributors. They were all banned from participating in future Dumas. As a result, the Kadet party turned towards conservatism and no longer consciously identified themselves as a party for 'the people'.

== Background ==
The Constitutional Democratic Party was formed in Moscow from 12 to 18 October 1905 at the height of the Russian Revolution of 1905 when Tsar Nicholas II was forced to sign the October Manifesto, granting basic civil liberties. The Kadets were to the immediate left of the Octobrists, another liberal party organized at the same time. Unlike the Octobrists, who were committed to constitutional monarchy from the start, the Kadets were at first ambiguous on the subject but demanded universal suffrage (even for women) and a Constituent Assembly that would determine the country's form of government. The Kadets were one of the parties invited by the reform-minded Prime Minister Sergei Witte to join his cabinet in October and November 1905, but the negotiations broke down over the Kadets' radical demands and Witte's refusal to drop notorious reactionaries like Pyotr Nikolayevich Durnovo from the cabinet.

In the wake of the 1905 Revolution, Russia's first modern parliament, the first Duma, was convoked. It rapidly turned into a revolutionary tribune, "a rhetorical battering ram against the fortress of autocracy". On the first day of the Duma, the parliamentarians condemned the government's political repression, and demands of amnesty of political prisoners were voiced from the Tauride Palace. The calls commenced after a boat full of representatives sailed down the Neva and passed by the Kresty prison, and an emotional waving encounter between the prisoners and the representatives happened. As the representatives found their seats, Ivan Petrunkevich, the leader of the Kadets (Kadets), asked the assembly to devote their first free thoughts and words to "those who sacrificed their own freedom for the liberation of our dear Russia". The hall burst into shouting "Amnesty, Amnesty" towards the ministers attending, and amnesty for the political prisoners, a prerogative exclusively held by the Tsar, were included in an address to the Emperor that also included demands for increased liberties such as universal suffrage, radical land reforms, further executive powers to the Duma, a government responsible to the parliament, and the abolition of the reactionary consultative State Council. After two weeks of silence, the government passed its two first bills for the approval of the Duma: one for the construction of a greenhouse at the Imperial University of Dorpat and one for a new laundry. That was in effect a declaration of a "legislative war", as the government would not even recognise the Duma's demands for reform.

It was clear by then that the Duma's dissolution was only a matter of time, and after further radical speeches, it was dissolved 72 days after it was convoked, on 21 July (8 July O.S.). New elections for a second Duma were called for the following February, and Prime Minister Ivan Goremykin was replaced by Stolypin, who was a well-known advocate for the abolition of the communal system and was known for repressive measures to restore order in the provinces. The liberals of the first Duma were subsequently outraged. Prince Georgy Lvov was one of those outraged by the "blatant attack on the parliamentary principle", even though he had opposed the land reform. He became radicalised after he had been a "moderate liberal". The government, on the other hand, deemed the Duma "dysfunctional".

== Manifesto ==
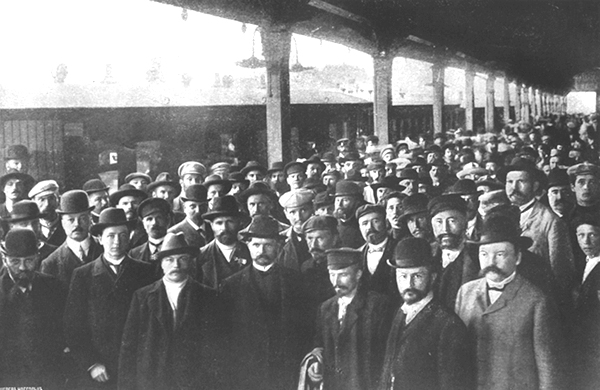
Former Deputies of disbanded State Duma arrive from Saint Petersburg to Vyborg to sign the Manifesto.

Lvov became one of the Kadets who traveled to Vyborg (Finnish: Viipuri), Finland's second city, to protest the government. There, the Kadet members and liberals signed a manifesto calling on the Russian people to rebel against the government by refusing to pay taxes or provide recruits for the army.

According to the historian Orlando Figes, the Vyborg Manifesto was "a typical example of the Kadets' militant posturing" since Duma's opening.

The Manifesto was written by Pavel Milyukov and signed by 120 Kadet and 80 Trudovik and Social Democrat deputies, alongside some other political representatives like Social Revolutionaries and Muslims.

== Aftermath ==
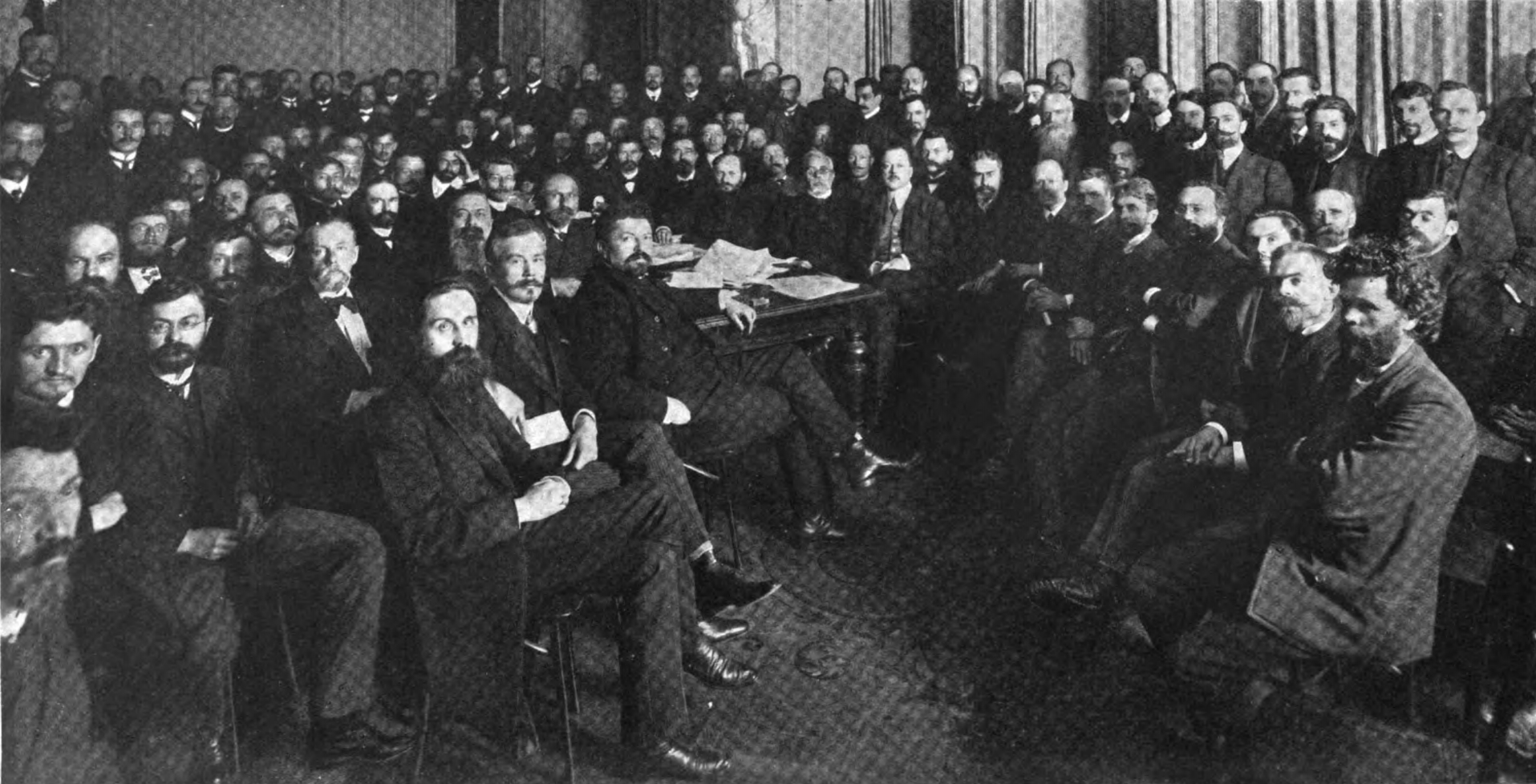
Gathering during the trial of politicians involved in the Vyborg Manifesto. All except two were sentenced to three months in prison.

The Manifesto was met with nearly-universal indifference from the people, which allowed the government to use repressive methods to silence its most outspoken liberal critics. Over 100 leading members of the Kadet Party were brought to trial and then suspended from the Duma for their participation in the manifesto. They were replaced in the Second and the Third Dumas by less radical and less talented politicians than those who had been suspended. The new politicians also went along a more conservative line and stayed within the Tsar's laws to defend the parliament, as the party now lived in the "shadow of the "Vyborg complex"". The entire Kadet leadership was one of the groups that were targeted by being banned from participation in future Dumas.

As a result of the events surrounding the Manifesto, the Kadet Party lost all trust in the people's support and no longer claimed to represent them. Instead, they consciously became what they de facto had been all along: the "natural party" of the bourgeois. The liberals' failure to rally the masses in defence of the Duma in practice left them "high and dry", clinging on in the hope of persuading the Tsarist regime to liberalise itself and with an even larger fear of 'the masses'.

Despite their change towards conservatism, the government remained suspicious of the Kadets until the fall of the monarchy in 1917.

== Signatories ==
- Pyotr Dmitriyevich Dolgorukov
- Sergey Muromtsev
- Pavel Novgorodtsev
- Sergey Urusov

Note: Georgy Lvov became ill whilst traveling to Vyborg and had to return to the capital. It is, however, clear that he sympathised with it.

== Bibliography ==
- Figes, Orlando (2014). A People's Tragedy: The Russian Revolution 1891–1924. London: The Bodley Head. ISBN 9781847922915.
- Gross, David (ed.) We Won’t Pay!: A Tax Resistance Reader, ISBN 1-4348-9825-3 pp. 307–312
- Lee, Stephen J. Lenin and Revolutionary Russia, Routledge, 2003
- Phillips, Steve. Lenin and the Russian Revolution, Heinemann, 2000, ISBN 0435327194
