= Pavel Dolgorukov =

Russian landowner and aristocrat (1866–1927)

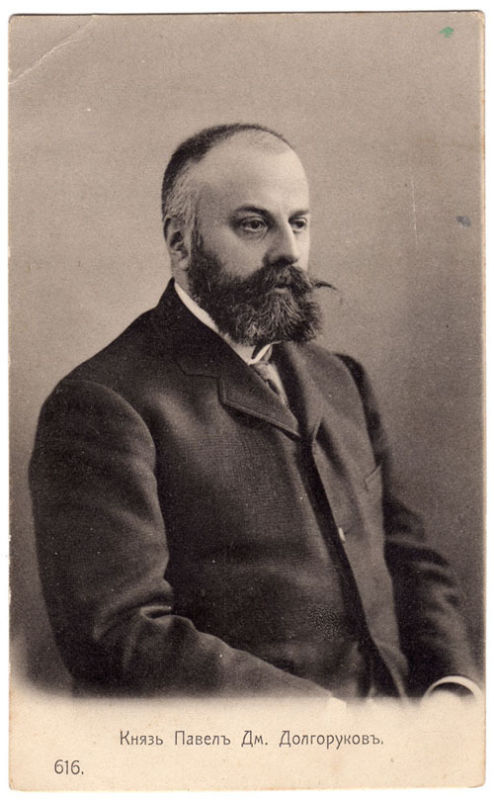
- Born: 21 May 1866; Tsarskoye Selo, Russia
- Died: 9 June 1927 (aged 61); Soviet Union
- Cause of death: Execution by shooting
- Education: Imperial Moscow University (1889)
- Occupation: Landowner
- Title: Prince
- Political party: Cadet

Prince Pavel Dmitriyevich Dolgorukov (Russian: Павел Дмитриевич Долгоруков; 21 May 1866 – June 9, 1927) was a Russian landowner and aristocrat who was executed by the Bolsheviks in 1927.

== Biography ==
Prince Pavel Dolgorukov was born in 1866. He was a member of the Dolgorukov family, one of the oldest branches of the Russian aristocracy during the imperial period.

He inherited great wealth and was involved in the work of the zemstvo (regional councils), particularly in the Moscow region, where he owned an estate. Prior to the 1905 revolution, he identified himself primarily with the liberals. In 1905, he helped to found the Constitutional Democratic Party, also known as the Cadets. He served as chairman of its central committee from 1911 to 1915. At one point, he was a member of the Imperial Duma in St. Petersburg and led the Cadet faction there, but he preferred to work in his own constituency in Moscow.

Before the outbreak of World War I, Dolgorukov had shown some interest in the pacifist movement, but once Russia joined the war, he became a fervent supporter of the military effort. He was in charge of a Red Cross unit on the Galician front.

After the Bolsheviks swept to power in 1917, Dolgorukov was arrested in Petrograd and was imprisoned for a while in Peter and Paul Fortress. Like the rest of his social class, he had lost all his wealth in the revolution. He made his way to the south and joined the White movement, first under the leadership of Lavr Kornilov and then under Anton Denikin. According to an anecdote, he would proudly display a suit that a tailor had made for him from old sacks. His military fervour never left him; even after Denikin was in full retreat and the White cause was lost, he would preach resistance to anyone who would listen.

He went with General Pyotr Wrangel to the Crimea, and after further defeats, took to the Balkans where he lived for several years as a penniless refugee. In 1925, having grown sick and tired of exile, he slipped across the Russian border disguised as a peasant. The Cheka arrested him but, failing to recognize their prisoner, released him. The following year, he was again wandering about southern Russia but this time he was detected and re-arrested by the Cheka.

On June 9, 1927, he was executed along with 19 other former officers and members of the Russian aristocracy. The Cheka had charged them with the assassination of Soviet ambassador Peter Voikov in Warsaw. They were shot without trial.

Pavel Dolgorukov had a twin brother named Pyotr, who lived on until 1951.
