= Pyotr Yershov =

Pyotr Yershov may refer to:

- Pyotr Mikhaylovich Yershov (1910–1994), Russian theater director and art theoretician
- Pyotr Pavlovich Yershov (1815–1869), Russian poet
