= Dynamo Leningrad (bandy) =

- City: Leningrad, Soviet Union
- Founded: 1924
- Folded: 1965

Dynamo Leningrad (Russian: Динамо Ленинград) was a bandy club which existed from 1924–1965 in Saint Petersburg. During that time, Saint Petersburg was called Leningrad.

The club won the bronze medals in the Soviet Union championship in 1936. The club was the runner-up finalist in the Soviet Cup in 1947. The club won the local Leningrad championship in 1935, 1936, 1938, 1939, 1941, 1945, 1946, 1947.

Well-known players and coaches in the club were, among others, Mikhail Butusov and Valentin Fyodorov.

== Sources ==
The information in this article as of 23 July 2015 is based on the corresponding article on Russian Wikipedia, which names the book Соснин В.И., Щеглов М.И., Юрин В.Л. Хоккей с мячом: Энциклопедия. — М: Новые технологии, 2009. — 808 с. — ISBN 978-5-86541-025-6 as its source.
