= Blinov =

Blinov (Russian: Блинов), or Blinova (feminine; Блинова), is a Russian surname, derived from the word "блин" (pancake). Notable people with the surname include:

- Aleksandr Blinov (equestrian) (1954–2021), Soviet equestrian and Olympic champion
- Aleksandr Blinov (sport shooter) (b. 1981), Russian sport shooter
- Alexei Blinov (b. 1964), electronic engineer and new media artist
- Fyodor Blinov (1827–1902), Russian inventor
- Pyotr Blinov (1913–1942), Soviet Udmurt writer and journalist
- Viktor Blinov (1945–1968), Soviet ice hockey player
- Yury Blinov (b. 1949), Soviet ice hockey player
