= Pyotr Dolgorukov =

Pyotr Dolgorukov may refer to:

- Pyotr Dmitriyevich Dolgorukov (1866–1951), Russian politician
- Pyotr Vladimirovich Dolgorukov (1816–1868), Russian historian and journalist
