= Pyotr Ivanovich Isakov =

Russian classical guitarist (1886–1958)

Pyotr Ivanovich Isakov Петр Иванович Исаков
- Born: 1886; Alsou, Crimea
- Died: 1958 (aged 71–72)
- Occupations: Musician, arranger, teacher
- Instrument: Classical guitar

Pyotr Ivanovich Isakov (Russian: Петр Иванович Исаков; 1886–1958) was a Russian classical guitarist known for his arrangements and performances, as well as for his teaching activities. Born in Alsou, Crimea, Isakov started playing the seven-string guitar at the age of nine, and later learnt to play the standard six-string guitar. He moved to Saint Petersburg in 1910 in order to complete his musical studies. In 1913, he was invited to perform for the Emperor Nicholas II, and spent his later career working as a guitarist at the Mariinsky Theatre. As a guitarist, he received influences from Andrés Segovia and Francisco Tárrega. He composed more than a thousand original pieces, and transcribed eight collections of pieces, amongst which there were several by Johann Sebastian Bach and Ludwig van Beethoven (such as the famous Moonlight Sonata).
