= Pyotr Sokolov =

Pyotr Sokolov may refer to

- Pyotr Sokolov (philologist) (1764–1835), secretary of the Russian Academy
- Pyotr Sokolov (portraitist) (1791–1848), Russian portraitist, father of the painter of the same name
- Pyotr Sokolov (painter) (1821–1899), Russian painter and graphic artist, son of the portraitist of the same name
- Pyotr Sokolov (footballer) (1890–1971), Russian football player and spy
