= Pyotr Petrovich =

Pyotr Petrovich can refer to:

- Pyotr Vershigora (1905–1963), Soviet writer
- Pyotr Sokolov (footballer) (1890–1971), Russian soccer player
- Pyotr Sokolov (painter) (1821–1899), Russian painter and illustrator
- Pyotr Shirshov (1905–1953), Soviet oceanographer, hydrobiologist, polar explorer, statesman, academician, and Hero of the Soviet Union
- Peter Troubetzkoy (1822–1892), Russian diplomat, administrator and general
- Pyotr Schmidt (1867–1906), a leader of the Sevastopol Uprising during the Russian Revolution of 1905.
- Pyotr Semyonov-Tyan-Shansky (1827–1914), Russian geographer and statistician, managed Russian Geographical Society
- Peter Lacy (1678–1751), Russian imperial commander
- Pyotr Vasilevsky (1956–2012), retired Belarusian professional football coach and player
- Pyotr Glebov (1915–2000), Russian film and stage actor
- Pyotr Shilovsky (1871–1924), Russian count, jurist, statesman, governor of Kostroma (1910–1912) and Olonets Governorate (1912–1913), inventor of the gyrocar
- Pyotr Suvchinsky (1892–1985), Ukrainian artistic patron and writer on music
- Peter von Glehn (1835–1876), Russian botanist of Baltic German origin
- Pyotr Konchalovsky (1876–1956), Russian painter, member of Jack of Diamonds group
- Grand Duke Pyotr Petrovich (1715–1719), son of Peter the Great and Catherine I of Russia
