= Pyotr Pavlovich Pelehin =

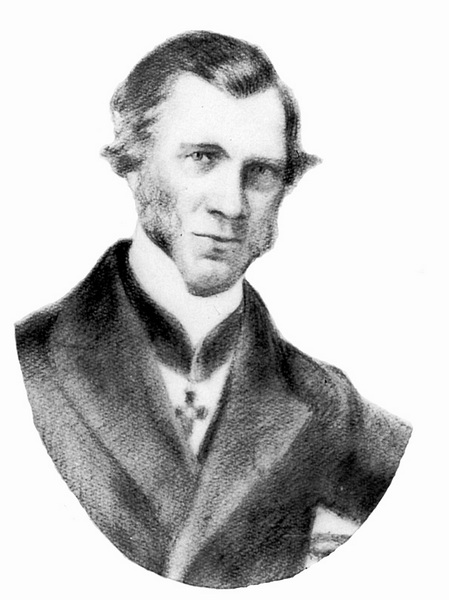
- Born: 1789; Kiev, Russian Empire
- Died: September 22, 1871 (aged 81–82); Kiev, Russian Empire
- Education: University of Edinburgh
- Occupation: Professor
- Known for: Contributions to the development of forensic toxicology

Pyotr Pavlovich Pelehin (1789 – September 22, 1871) was a Russian medical doctor and teacher.

== Early life and education ==
Pelehin was the son of an Orthodox priest. Before 1811 he was raised in the Kiev Theological Academy. He became a grammar school teacher of German, French, and Hebrew languages and church history. In 1820 Pelehin joined the Imperial Medico-Surgical Academy as a volunteer, where he graduated top of his class in 1824, earning a gold medal at the academic conference.

In 1827 he was elected an honorary member of Jena Mineralogical Society. In 1828 Pelehin continued his academic studies in London, where he became an honorary member of the Royal Dzhennerovskogo Society (Royal Jennerian Society), then passed the examination at the University of Edinburgh and received the title of surgeon, there he presented his thesis "De neurosibus in genere", he received a medical degree and he was elected Fellow of the Royal physical society of Edinburgh.

== Career ==
Pelehin left for the post of Associate Professor of Physiology and Pathology and in 1825 he was chosen among 4 doctors to be sent abroad. Pelehin, who was one of the poorest who volunteered at the academy, had made a commitment to serve in the military for several years as a pupil of the Academy of Kazennokoshtny.

Pelehin went abroad, attended internships at universities and hospitals in Lemberg, Cracow, Vienna and listened to lectures on pharmacology, toxicology, hygiene and therapy. From Vienna he went to the University of Berlin, then in Breslau and Paris. In the summer of 1829 he visited the universities of Holland, then again, he attended lectures in Paris.

During this time Pelehin was elected a member of many foreign medical societies: correspondent for the Medical Surgical Society in Berlin, correspondent for the Russian Society Braslav improvements (1829) and a member of the Medical and Surgical Society in London (1830) among others.

In 1829, Pelehin returned to Russia and was appointed the position of associate professor of ophthalmology and founded a small eye clinic. In the same year he passed doctoral exams and received from the Medical-Surgical Academy the title of doctor of medicine without the dissertation, "honoris causa".

In August 1830, after reading the lecture "de amaurosibus" (in Latin) and another trial lecture "about artificial pupil" (in Russian), he was confirmed in the rank of associate professor, but was forced to leave the Academy for several years. In connection with the cholera epidemic Pelehin was appointed as a member of the commission for the study and stop this epidemic, sent to Saratov, then in Astrakhan, where he stayed for three years. In 1831, he contracted severe form of cholera, from which almost died.

In 1834, Pelehin was sent to London for a year to study lithoclasty (Lithotripsy) by the method Gertlu and other issues. After returning home he became a professor of forensic medicine, medical care and police, he was ordered to take the chair. In 1839 he was awarded the degree of Doctor in Surgery. In 1840-1841 he lectured in ophthalmology. In the same year he was confirmed in the rank of Distinguished Professor, and in 1846 he retired with the rank of state councillor. After leaving the academy, he returned home to Kiev. From 1849, he taught medicine at the Kiev Theological Academy and remained in that position until 1870, and died September 22, 1871, aged 83.

== Scientific activity ==
Pelehin made a great contribution to the development of forensic toxicology. He was one of the first Russian scientists to appreciate the experimental formulation of teaching medical sciences and considered absolutely essential to complete practical experience to introduce students to read to them by scientific subjects.

Pelehin was one of the great linguists of his time, and contemporaries testify his remarkable eloquence. At the same time, he was one of the most educated men of his time, and had a remarkable erudition. His large library, in particular, works on forensic medicine and ophthalmology was donated in 1874 to the Mediko-surgical Academy by his son, Professor Paul Pelehin.
