= Mikhail Butusov =

Soviet football player and manager (1900–1963)

Personal information
- Full name: Mikhail Pavlovich Butusov
- Date of birth: 18 June 1900
- Place of birth: Saint Petersburg, Russia
- Date of death: 11 April 1963 (aged 62)
- Place of death: Leningrad, USSR
- Position: Striker

Youth career
- 1912-1917: Unitas St. Petersburg

Senior career*
Years	Team	Apps	(Gls)
1917–1930	Unitas St. Petersburg		
1931–1936	Dynamo Leningrad		

International career
1924–1925	USSR	2	(3)

Managerial career
- 1936–1938: Dynamo Leningrad
- 1939–1940: FC Dinamo Tbilisi
- 1941: FC Dynamo Kyiv
- 1946: Zenit Leningrad
- 1947: FC Dynamo Kyiv
- 1948–1953: Dynamo Leningrad
- * Club domestic league appearances and goals

Mikhail Pavlovich Butusov (Russian: Михаил Павлович Бутусов; 18 June 1900 in Myshkin, Yaroslavl province – 11 April 1963 in Leningrad) was a Soviet football player and coach and a bandy player. He was the brother of Vasily Butusov.

== Honours ==
- RSFSR Champion: 1924, 1932.
- Leningrad Champion: 1928, 1929, 1931, 1933, 1935.
- Soviet Bandy League bronze: 1936 (with Dynamo Leningrad).

== International career ==
Butusov made his debut for USSR on 16 November 1924 in a friendly against Turkey. He was the captain of the team and scored 2 goals in a 3:0 victory. This was the first official game of the Soviet Union in international football, and therefore Butusov scored the first ever goal for the USSR.
