= Natalia Bazhanova =

Russian political scientist (1947–2014)

- Наталья Бажанова
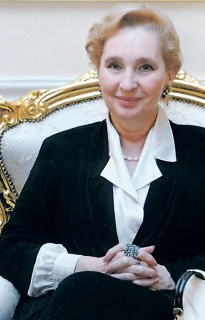
- Born: Natalia Evgenyeva Korsakova; 4 January 1947; Moscow, USSR
- Died: 7 June 2014 (aged 67), Krasnovidovo, Moscow Region, Russia
- Occupations: Political scientist, economist, educator, writer, diplomat
- Website: Website of the Diplomatic Academy of the MFA of Russia

Natalia Evgenyevna Bazhanova (née Korsakova; Russian: Наталья Евгеньевна Бажанова; 4 January 1947 – 7 June 2014) was an influential Russian political scientist, historian, economist, educator, writer, and diplomat.

She gained wider prominence through her works on Korea, China, the United States, and a post-Cold War world order: Between Dead Dogmas and Practical Requirements. External Economic Relations of North Korea (1992); The Most Mysterious War of the XX Century (Korean Conflict 1950–1953) (1997); Chinese Mosaic (2011); America: Yesterday and Today, Volumes 1, 2 (2005); International Relations in the XXI century (2011) etc.

== Career ==
1954–1964 – Secondary and high schools student in Baku and Moscow, graduated with distinction.

1964–1969 – Student of Moscow State Institute of International Relations (MGIMO), majoring in Asian studies and world economy, graduated with distinction.

1969–1973 – Senior Researcher, Institute of Oriental Studies, USSR Academy of Sciences.

1974 – Successfully completed her Ph.D. at the Institute of Oriental Studies, USSR Academy of Sciences. The title: "The Role of Soviet-Korean Economic Cooperation in the Development of North Korea’s Economy".

1973–1979 – Press Attaché of the USSR Consulate General in San Francisco (USA).

1979–1981 – Leading Researcher, Institute of Oriental Studies, USSR Academy of Sciences.

1981–1985 – Press Attaché of the USSR Embassy in Beijing (China).

1985–1993 – Leading Researcher, Institute of Oriental Studies, USSR/Russian Academy of Sciences.

1993–2014 – Consultant of the Center of Asian-Pacific Studies, The Diplomatic Academy, Ministry of Foreign Affairs of the Russian Federation.

2003 – Received her doctorate in Pusan, South Korea. The title: "The Economic System of North Korea (Sources, Evolution, Main Characteristics, Structure, Methods of Management, Weak Points, Prospects of Reforms)".

Foreign languages: Korean, English, French, Chinese.

== Family ==
Parents. Father: Evgeny Pavlovich Korsakov (1917–1990), sea captain, Chief Inspector of the USSR State Committee on Labor and Wages. Mother: Nina Antonovna Korsakova (née Klenovskya) (1921–2005), physician, Therapy Department Head, Botkin Hospital, Moscow.

Husband: Evgeny Petrovich Bazhanov (born 1946), President of the Diplomatic Academy of the Ministry of Foreign Affairs of the Russian Federation, political scientist, historian, educator, writer, and diplomat.

== Academic activities ==
Natalia Bazhanova delivered more than 200 lectures at over 60 universities, colleges and research centers in 22 countries, including Harvard, Columbia, Stanford, and George Washington Universities, University of California, RAND, Cambridge, Oxford, Beijing, Tokyo, Seoul National, Australian National Universities, made over 100 presentations at multinational conferences and gave more than 400 interviews to TV, radio, newspapers, and magazines in 30 countries.

She was the academic advisor of 28 Ph.D. candidates, including President of South Korea Kim Dae-jung, Prime Minister of Kazakhstan Kassym-Jomart Tokayev, Foreign Minister of Kyrgyzstan Alikbek Jekshenkulov, Ambassadors to Russia of Yemen, United Arab Emirates, and Palestine, and many prominent Russian politicians, educators, and diplomats.

Dr. Bazhanova is the author of 31 books, more than 30 book chapters and parts and over 420 articles on Chinese, Korean, Japanese, ASEAN, Asia-Pacific, U.S., European, Middle Eastern affairs, foreign policies and domestic issues of Russia, CIS countries (published in Russia, U.S., ROK, PRC, Taiwan, Japan, Australia, Hong Kong, New Zealand, Germany, Britain, Singapore, Thailand, Israel, Egypt, Spain, Italy, Turkey, Austria, Iran, Switzerland, Yugoslavia, Syria). She edited 43 books and other publications, was a member of editorial boards of several magazines, as well as a columnist of a number of South Korean and Taiwanese newspapers.

== Published books ==
1. The Gilded Ghetto (Chinese, Korean, and Japanese Communities in the USA). Moscow: Nauka, 1983, co-author Evgeny Bazhanov, under pennames N.E. Korsakova, E.P. Sevastyanov.
2. The Last Frontier (American Society in the 1970s). Moscow: Politisdat, 1984, co-author Evgeny Bazhanov.
3. Between Dead Dogmas and Practical Requirements. External Economic Relations of North Korea. Seoul: The Korea Economic Daily, 1992, in Korean.
4. Russia and Korea. Seoul: Seoul Sihnmun, 1992, co-author Evgeny Bazhanov, in Korean.
5. External Economic Relations of North Korea. Looking for a Way Out of a Deadend. Moscow: Nauka, 1993.
6. Soviet Foreign Policy under Gorbachev. Taipei (Taiwan): Zhongyang Ribao, 1993, in Chinese.
7. Russia's Changing Foreign Policy. Köln: Bundesinstitut für ostwissenschaftliche und internationale Studien (BIOST), 1996. ISSN 0435-7183.
8. The Most Mysterious War of the XX Century (Korean Conflict 1950–1953), Seoul: Youl Rim, 1997, in Korean.
9. Russian-Chinese Relations: Problems and Prospects. Moscow: Nauchnya Kniga, 1999.
10. The DPRK Reports (NN 1–21), Center for Nonproliferation Studies, The Monterey Institute of International Studies. Monterey, California, USA, 1996–2000.
11. Studies in Contemporary International Development. Volume 1. Moscow: Nauchnaya Kniga, 2001–2002, co-author Evgeny Bazhanov. ISBN 5-7671-0062-4.
12. Studies in Contemporary International Development. Volume 2. Moscow: Nauchnaya Kniga, 2001–2002, co-author Evgeny Bazhanov. ISBN 5-7671-0005-5.
13. Studies in Contemporary International Development. Volume 3. Moscow: Nauchnaya Kniga, 2001–2002, co-author Evgeny Bazhanov. ISBN 5-7671-0047-0.
14. Contemporary World. Moscow: Izvestia, 2004, co-author Evgeny Bazhanov. ISBN 5-206-00634-3.
15. America: Yesterday and Today. Volume 1. Moscow: Izvestia, 2005, co-author Evgeny Bazhanov. ISBN 5-206-00664-5.
16. America: Yesterday and Today. Volume 2. Moscow: Izvestia, 2005, co-author Evgeny Bazhanov. ISBN 5-206-00665-3.
17. Oriental Express with Stops in the West. The Eyewitness' Notes. Moscow: Vostok-Zapad, 2008, co-author Evgeny Bazhanov. ISBN 978-5-478-00862-8.
18. Edible Dragons. Mysteries of the Chinese Cuisine. Moscow: Vostok-Zapad, 2008, co-author Evgeny Bazhanov. ISBN 978-5-478-00919-9.
19. Chinese Riddles. On Chinese Language, Characters, Calligraphy, and the View of the World "Through Characters". Moscow: Vostok-Zapad, 2008, co-author Evgeny Bazhanov. ISBN 978-5-478-00918-2.
20. A Country of Merry Gods. Religious World of the Chinese People. Moscow: Vostok-Zapad, 2008, co-author Evgeny Bazhanov. ISBN 978-5-478-01189-5.
21. France. Both Quazimodo and Coco Chanel. Moscow: Vostok-Zapad, 2009, co-author Evgeny Bazhanov. ISBN 978-5-478-01222-9.
22. Where is Mankind Headed? Trends in International Relations in the XXI century. Moscow: Vostok-Zapad, 2009, co-author Evgeny Bazhanov. ISBN 978-5-478-01272-4.
23. Wisdom of the Orient and the West. World Folklore. Moscow: Vostok-Zapad, 2010, co-authors Peter Bazhanov and Evgeny Bazhanov. ISBN 978-5-478-01291-5.
24. The Multipolar World. Moscow: Vostok-Zapad, 2010, co-author Evgeny Bazhanov. ISBN 978-5-478-01296-0.
25. Sketches of Korea. Moscow: Vostok-Zapad, 2010, co-author Evgeny Bazhanov. ISBN 978-5-478-01310-3.
26. International Relations in the XXI Century. Moscow: Vostok-Zapad, 2011, co-author Evgeny Bazhanov. ISBN 978-5-478-01324-0.
27. Chinese Mosaic. Moscow: Vostok-Zapad, 2011, co-author Evgeny Bazhanov. ISBN 978-5-478-01325-7.
28. Peace and War. Moscow: Vostok-Zapad, 2011, co-author Evgeny Bazhanov. ISBN 978-5-478-01333-2.
29. Italy, both Sad and Merry. Travel Notes. Moscow: Vostok-Zapad, 2011, co-author Evgeny Bazhanov. ISBN 978-5-478-01338-7.
30. The Clash and the Dialogue of Civilizations. Moscow: Ves Mir, 2013, co-author Evgeny Bazhanov. ISBN 978-5-7777-0561-7.
31. Wisdom of the Orient and the West. World Folklore. Moscow: Ves Mir, 2014, co-authors Peter Bazhanov and Evgeny Bazhanov. ISBN 978-5-47801291-5.

== Awards and Recognitions ==
- 1993. Journalistic Prize. Zhongyang Zhibao newspaper, Taipei, Taiwan.
- Honorary Doctor of Seoul National University, Seoul, S. Korea, 1997.
- Honorary Doctor of Beijing University, Beijing, China, 1998.
- 1997. Journalistic Prize, Kyunghyang Shinmun newspaper, Seoul, S. Korea.
- 1999. Journalistic Prize, Seoul Shinmun // Taehan Maeil newspaper, Seoul, S. Korea.
- Inaugural Member of the International Biographical Center (IBC), Leading Scientists of the World, Cambridge, England, since 2006.
- Honorary Counsellor to the All-China History Society, Beijing, China, since 2012.
- Honorary Professor of the Moscow International Higher School of Business, Moscow, since 2012.
- Honorary Doctor of The Diplomatic Academy of the Ministry of Foreign Affairs of the Russian Federation, Moscow, Russia, 2014.
