= Pyotr Zgursky =

Belarusian footballer

Personal information
- Full name: Pyotr Aleksandrovich Zgursky
- Date of birth: 12 July 2001 (age 25)
- Place of birth: Dobrush, Gomel Oblast, Belarus
- Height: 1.86 m (6 ft 1 in)
- Position: Forward

Youth career
- 2016–2018: RGUOR Minsk
- 2018–2019: Gomel

Senior career*
Years	Team	Apps	(Gls)
2019–2022	Gomel	1	(0)
2019	→ Sputnik Rechitsa (loan)	7	(0)
2020	→ Krumkachy Minsk (loan)	8	(0)
2021	→ Krumkachy Minsk (loan)	7	(1)
2022–2023	Bumprom Gomel	15	(15)

International career
2017	Belarus U17	3	(0)
2019	Belarus U19	1	(0)
- * Club domestic league appearances and goals as of 30 May 2023

Pyotr Aleksandrovich Zgursky (Belarusian: Пётр Аляксандравіч Згурскі; Russian: Пётр Александрович Згурский; born 12 July 2001) is a Belarusian professional footballer.
