= Alexei Goncearov =

Moldovan footballer

Personal information
- Date of birth: 21 February 1984 (age 42)
- Place of birth: Bălţi, Moldova
- Height: 1.85 m (6 ft 1 in)
- Position: Defender

Team information
- Current team: Sîngerei

Senior career*
Years	Team	Apps	(Gls)
2002–2003	Sheriff Tiraspol	3	(0)
2004–2005	Tiraspol	17	(0)
2005–2006	Dinamo Bender	5	(0)
2006–2009	Olimpia Bălţi	18	(0)
2009–2010	Dinamo Brest	13	(0)
2010	CSCA-Rapid Chişinău	14	(0)
2011	Locomotiva Bălți	13	(0)
2011–2013	Dinamo Brest	35	(1)
2014	Sîngerei		
- * Club domestic league appearances and goals as of 13 December 2013

Alexei Goncearov (born 24 February 1984) is a Moldovan former professional footballer.
