= Pyotr Ustinov =

Russian footballer

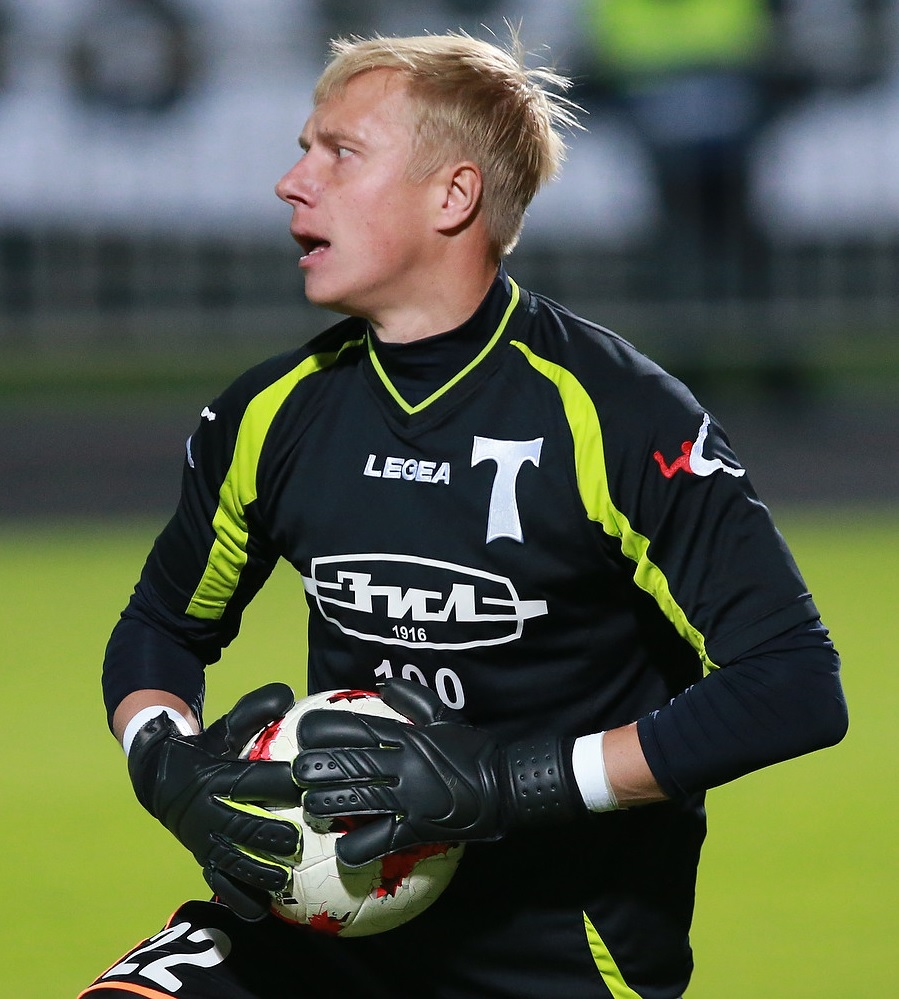
- Ustinov with Torpedo Moscow in 2017

Personal information
- Full name: Pyotr Mikhailovich Ustinov
- Date of birth: 8 February 1987 (age 39)
- Place of birth: Dresden, East Germany
- Height: 1.85 m (6 ft 1 in)
- Position: Goalkeeper

Team information
- Current team: FC Torpedo Moscow (U-21 GK coach)

Youth career
- 1993–2000: PFC CSKA Moscow
- 2001–2004: SDYuShOR Spartak-2 Moscow

Senior career*
Years	Team	Apps	(Gls)
2005	FC Monstyrskoye podvorye Yukhnov (amateur)		
2006–2010	FC Sportakademklub Moscow	69	(0)
2008	→ FC Istra (loan)	8	(0)
2011–2016	FC Volga Tver	82	(0)
2016–2019	FC Torpedo Moscow	47	(0)
Total		206	(0)

Managerial career
- 2020–2025: Academy FC Torpedo Moscow (GK coach)
- 2025–: FC Torpedo Moscow (U-21 GK coach)
- * Club domestic league appearances and goals

Pyotr Mikhailovich Ustinov (Russian: Пётр Михайлович Устинов; born 8 February 1987) is a Russian former professional football player.

== Club career ==
He played in the Russian Football National League for FC Sportakademklub Moscow in 2008.
