= Pyotr Postnikov =

- Born: 1666
- Died: 1703
- Occupation(s): a Russian physiologist and diplomat

Pyotr Vasilyevich Postnikov (Russian: Пётр Васильевич Постников), was the first Russian physiologist and a diplomat.

== Life ==
A son of a diplomat Vasily Timofeyevich Postnikov (died 1708). Circa 1689 he finished studies in Slavic Greek Latin Academy. In 1692 Pyotr Postnikov was sent to study medicine in the University of Padua. In 1694 he became a doctor of medicine and philosophy.

In 1697 Pyotr Postnikov translated the Quran to Russian language from André du Ryer's French version. He participated in the work of the Karlowitz Congress (1698–99). He returned to Russia in 1701 and served in the Pharmaceutical Prikaz. In 1703 Postnikov was sent to Paris as an unofficial agent, where he died.
