= Pyotr Yeryomin =

Russian ice hockey player

- Born: July 14, 1992 (age 32); Elektrostal, Russia
- Height: 6 ft 6 in (198 cm)
- Weight: 170 lb (77 kg; 12 st 2 lb)
- Position: Goaltender
- Catches: Left
- KHL team: Amur Khabarovsk
- NHL draft: Undrafted
- Playing career: 2009–present

Pyotr Yeryomin (born July 14, 1992) is a Russian professional ice hockey goaltender playing with Amur Khabarovsk of the Kontinental Hockey League (KHL).

Yeryomin made his Kontinental Hockey League debut playing with Amur Khabarovsk during the 2013–14 season.
