= Pyotr Sorokin =

Russian footballer

Personal information
- Full name: Pyotr Yefimovich Sorokin
- Date of birth: 1889
- Place of birth: Saint Petersburg, Russia
- Date of death: 1942 (aged 52–53)
- Position: Striker

Senior career*
Years	Team	Apps	(Gls)
1906	Natsionaly Saint Petersburg		
1907–1912	Sport Saint Petersburg		
1915	Sport Petrograd		

International career
1912	Russia	1	(0)
- * Club domestic league appearances and goals

Pyotr Yefimovich Sorokin (Russian: Пётр Ефимович Сорокин) (born in 1889 in Saint Petersburg; died in 1942) was an association football player.

== International career ==
Sorokin made his debut for the Russian Empire on July 14, 1912 in a friendly against Hungary.
