= Valentin A. Bazhanov =

Russian philosopher and historian

- Born: January 10, 1953 (age 73); Kazan, Russia
- Education: Leningrad University (PhD)
- Occupations: professor, author, researcher
- Awards: USSR Academy of Sciences prize

Valentin A. Bazhanov (born 10 January 1953 in Kazan, Russia) is a professor and chairperson of the Philosophy Department at Ulyanovsk State University in Russia.
