= Pyotr Dementyev =

Pyotr Dementyev (Russian: Пётр Дементьев) can refer to the following people:

- Peter Demens (1850–1919), Russian-born American businessman
- Pyotr Dementyev (footballer) (1913—1998), Soviet footballer
- Pyotr Dementyev (politician), Soviet Minister of Aviation Industry 1953–1977
