= Pyotr Tolstoy =

Pyotr Tolstoy

- Pyotr Andreyevich Tolstoy (1645–1729), Russian statesman and diplomat
- Pyotr Aleksandrovich Tolstoy (1769–1844), Russian general and statesman, great grandson of above
- Pyotr Olegovich Tolstoy (born 1969), Russian broadcaster and parliamentarian
