= Pyotr Prokopovich =

Pyotr Prokopovich is the Russian-language variant of the names of the following persons:

- Petro Prokopovych, the founder of commercial beekeeping of Ukrainian descent
- Pyotr Prakapovich, Belarusian construction engineer, politician, statesman and a chairman of the National Bank of the Republic of Belarus
