= Pyotr Bardovsky =

Russian lawyer and Polish independence supporter

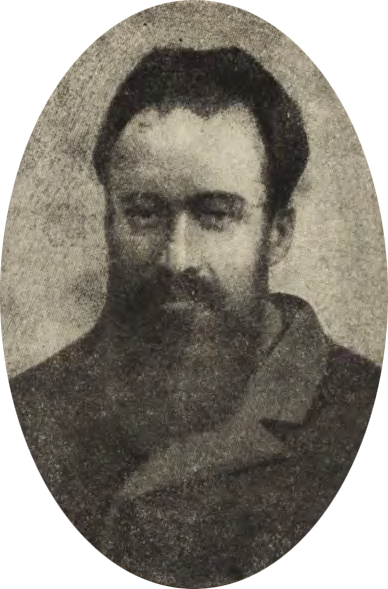
Pyotr Vasilevich Bardovsky

Pyotr Vasilevich Bardovsky (Russian: Петр Васильевич Бардовский, 1846–1886) was a Russian lawyer and a supporter of independence for Poland. He was executed for his connection to Polish revolutionaries.

== Biography ==
The son of a teacher, Bardovsky began practising law after graduating from Petersburg University in 1868. In 1880, he and his wife, Natalia Poll, moved to Warsaw, where he was appointed a Justice of the Peace, while secretly, in 1882, he joined the illegal Polish socialist party Proletariat. Their flat in the centre of Warsaw became the party headquarters, housing the secretariat and the archives. Bardovsky also acted as a contact between Russian and Polish revolutionaries. Bardovsky was arrested on 28 June 1884. At his trial, he denied being a member of any revolutionary party, but his links with revolutionaries were well established. He was sentenced to death, along with three members of the Proletariat, and hanged in the Warsaw Citadel on 28 January 1886.

== Family ==
Bardovksy's younger brother, Grigori, was also a lawyer. During the Trial of the Fifty, in March 1877, he acted as defence counsel for two wealthy sisters named Subbotina, who donated money to revolutionary groups. According to one of the other defendants, Olga Lyubatovich – "He had been remarkably warm and sympathetic toward all of us: during his argument for the defence, he became so emotional that the judge was obliged to interrupt proceedings for a few minutes to enable him to calm down." In July 1879, he was arrested for harbouring Olga, who was in Petersburg illegally and had called at his dacha looking for somewhere to stay. He had a mental breakdown in prison, from which he never recovered.
