= Pyotr Yezhov =

Soviet footballer and manager

Personal information
- Full name: Pyotr Ivanovich Yezhov
- Date of birth: 12 October 1900
- Place of birth: Gatchina, Russia
- Date of death: 17 January 1975 (aged 74)
- Place of death: Moscow, USSR
- Position: Defender

Senior career*
Years	Team	Apps	(Gls)
1917	SK Lyubiteli Petrograd		
1918–1919	Tosmen Petrograd		
1920–1923	Sport Petrograd		
1924–1925	Spartak Petrogradsky Rayon Leningrad		
1926	Vyborgsky Rayon Leningrad		
1927	Pishchevkus Leningrad		
1928–1932	Dynamo Leningrad		
1933	S. Ordzhonikidze Club Leningrad		
1934–1935	LDKA Leningrad		
1935–1936	Baltvod Leningrad		

International career
1924	USSR	1	(0)

Managerial career
- 1941: CSKA Moscow
- 1952–1953: VMS Moscow
- * Club domestic league appearances and goals

Pyotr Ivanovich Yezhov (Russian: Пётр Иванович Ежов) (born 12 October 1900 in Gatchina; died 17 January 1975 in Moscow) was a Soviet football player and manager.

== Honours ==
- RSFSR champion: 1924

== International career ==
Yezhov played his only game for USSR on 16 November 1924 in a friendly against Turkey.
