= Pyotr Grigorievich Goncharov =

Russian and Soviet composer (1888–1970)

- Пётр Григо́рьевич Гончаро́в
- Born: 18 October 1888; Kiev, Russian Empire
- Died: 20 March 1970 (aged 81); Kiev, Ukrainian Soviet Socialist Republic
- Burial place: Baikove Cemetery, Kiev, Ukraine

Pyotr Grigorievich Goncharov (Russian: Пётр Григо́рьевич Гончаро́в; 18 October 1888 – 20 March 1970) was a Russian and Soviet composer, conductor and choirmaster.

== Biography ==
Born to a poor family in 1888 in Kiev in the Russian Empire, Goncharov was a choral singer in his youth. In 1907, he graduated from the Baltic Fleet Musical College, where he studied clarinet. During his time at the college, he received lessons in conducting, harmony, composition and orchestral score reading from the famed Russian composer Reinhold Glière. He was later mentored by Alexander Koshetz. From 1907, he conducted the choirs of St. Vladimir's Cathedral and, later, Saint Sophia's Cathedral in Kiev.

Goncharov lost his sight due to illness in 1921, but remained active as a conductor and composer. He founded the Southwestern Railway Chorus, and also worked for the Kiev State Opera and the Ukrainian State Choir (DUMKA).

In 1940, he moved to Lviv. There he became the conductor of the newly-founded and now famous Ukrainian Trembita Chorus, while simultaneously working for the Lviv Opera, conducting its choir and orchestra.

In 1942, after the Nazi occupation of Kiev, he returned there to again conduct the choir of St. Vladimir's Cathedral. Goncharov died in Kiev in 1970, and was buried in Baikove Cemetery.

== Works ==
Goncharov's two best known works are the liturgical works Служба визволення ("Liberation Service") and Хресту Твоєму, known variously in English as "To Your Cross" and "Thy Cross We Worship", among other names. This latter is noteworthy in that it includes one of the lowest notes in the basso profondo range (C_{2}). "To Your Cross" was used in the soundtracks of Chris Marker's 1962 film, La Jetée.
