= Pyotr Dolgorukov (politician) =

Russian politician, born 1866

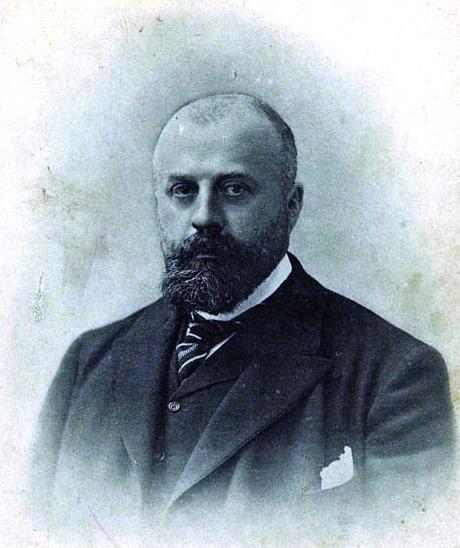

Prince Pyotr Dmitriyevich Dolgorukov (Russian: Князь Пётр Дми́триевич Долгору́ков; 1866, Tsarskoye Selo – 1951. Vladimir) was Russian liberal politician.

== Life ==
Graduate of Moscow University. Well-known zemstvo man and for many years chairman of Sudzha Zemstvo Board. For his radical pronouncements at the sessions of Sudzha Uezd Committee to Study the Needs of Agricultural Industry, he was removed from his post by Plehve but reinstated under Sviatopolk-Mirsky.

He was one of the founders of the Union of Liberation and of the periodical publication Osvobozhdenie. He participated in zemstvo congresses, 1904–1905. One of the founders of the Constitutional Democratic Party, member and vice-chairman of the First State Duma, 1906. He was convicted by the court and imprisoned for three months for signing the Vyborg Appeal.

In 1909 he was reelected chairman of Sudzhensky Uyezd Zemstvo Board. He married and returned home, where he lived with his family (children Mikhail and Natalia) until the revolution.

After the 1917 revolution the family moved to Kaukas, 1919 to Crimea, in 1920 they emigrated from Russia to Istanbul; from 1922 they lived in Prague, where Pyotr Dmitriyevich between 1927 and 1941 led Russian emigre organizations in Czechoslovakia. His twin brother Pavel Dolgorukov was executed by Bolsheviks in 1927.

On 9 June 1945, he was in Prague arrested by SMERSH, convicted for anti-Soviet activities and taken to the Soviet Union. He spent last years of his life in Soviet prisons. He died in 1951. The date and place is unclear, maybe Butyrska prison.

He was the Great Uncle of Norwegian singer Georg Kajanus of pop band Sailor.

== Bibliography ==
- Imperial Moscow University: 1755-1917: encyclopedic dictionary. Moscow: Russian political encyclopedia (ROSSPEN). 2010. pp. 219–220. ISBN 978-5-8243-1429-8 – via A. Andreev, D. Tsygankov.
