= Pyotr Mikhaylovich Yershov =

Soviet theater director (1910–1994)

Pyotr Mikhaylovich Yershov (Russian: Пётр Миха́йлович Ершо́в, 1910–1994) was a Soviet theater director and art theoretician, most famous for his textbooks on directing and works on Stanislavski's system.

He wrote Directing as a Practical Psychology, with forewords by Oleg Yefremov and P.V. Simonov, 1972, and Technology of an Actor in 1959, that is often recommended course material in Russian and American theater schools.
