= Pyotr Blinov =

Soviet Udmurt writer and journalist (1913–1942)

Pyotr Alexandrovich Blinov (Russian: Пётр Алекса́ндрович Блино́в; Pekshur village, Uvinsky District, Udmurtia 30 December [O.S. 17 December] 1913 – near Smolensk, January 7, 1942) was a Soviet Udmurt writer and journalist.

His most famous work was the novel Wanting to Live (Улэм потэ, Russian "Жить хочется"). He died in battle during World War II.
