= Aleksei Goncharov (footballer) =

Russian footballer

Personal information
- Full name: Aleksei Vladimirovich Goncharov
- Date of birth: 16 August 1988 (age 38)
- Height: 1.80 m (5 ft 11 in)
- Position: Midfielder

Senior career*
| Years | Team | Apps | (Gls) |
| 2005 | FC Zenit St. Petersburg | 0 | (0) |
| 2006 | FC Dynamo Barnaul | 5 | (0) |
| 2007 | FC Shakhtyor Prokopyevsk | 29 | (1) |
| 2008–2013 | FC Dynamo Barnaul | 125 | (3) |
| 2013 | FC Chita | 6 | (0) |
| 2015–2017 | FC Belogorsk | | |
| 2018 | FC Polimer Barnaul | | |
- * Club domestic league appearances and goals

Aleksei Vladimirovich Goncharov (Russian: Алексей Владимирович Гончаров; born 16 August 1988) is a Russian former professional football player.

== Club career ==
He played in the Russian Football National League for FC Dynamo Barnaul in 2008.
