= Pyotr Otsup =

Soviet photographer (1883–1963)

- Пётр Оцуп
- Self-portrait c. 1955
- Born: Pinkhus Abelevich Otsup; 21 July 1883; Saint Petersburg, Russia
- Died: 23 January 1963 (aged 79); Moscow, Soviet Union
- Occupation: Photojournalism

Pyotr Adolfovich Otsup (Russian: Пётр Адольфович Оцуп; born Pinkhus Abelevich Otsup (Russian: Пинхус Абелевич Оцуп); July 21 [O.S. July 8] 1883 – 23 January 1963), was a Russian and Soviet photographer. He photographed many historic events including the Russo-Japanese War, 1905 Russian Revolution, October Revolution in 1917, World War I and Russian Civil War. Otsup made nearly 40,000 photographs.

== Life and work ==
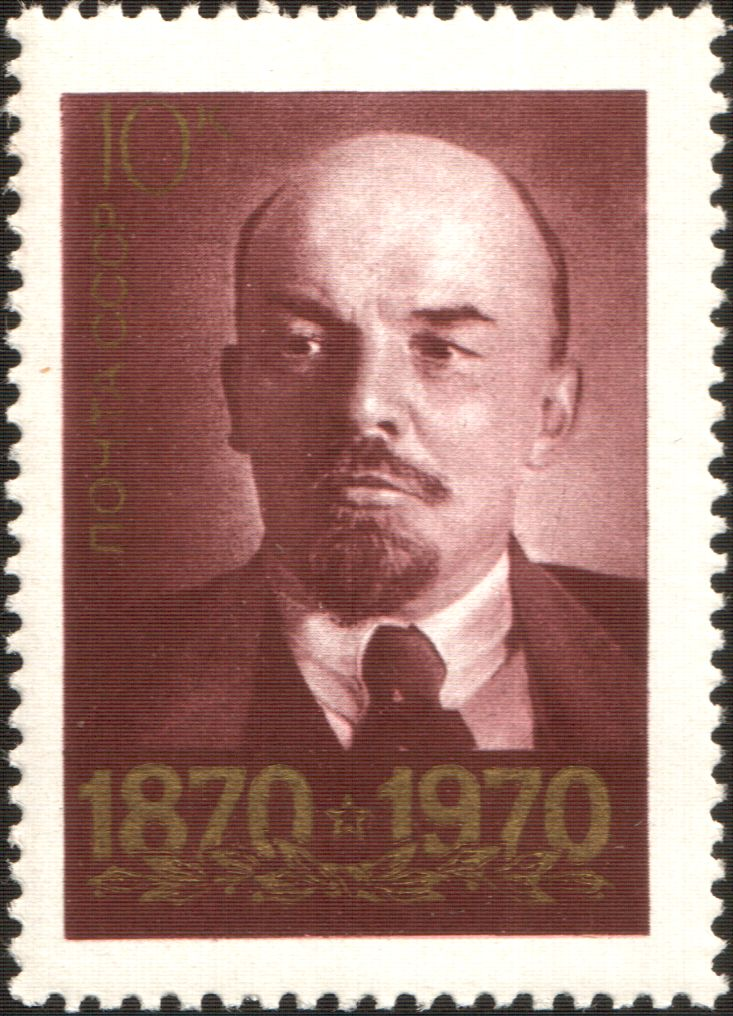
A portrait of Lenin by Otsup, as used on a Soviet Union postage stamp.

Otsup was born in 1883 in Saint Petersburg, Russia. He became interested in photography at the photo saloon, where he was studying during the 1890s. His career started as he was a photojournalist during the Russo-Japanese War. Beginning in 1900 he worked as a photographer for the magazine Ogoniok.

Otsup made portraits of Russian artists who worked before the revolution, including Leo Tolstoy, Sergei Rachmaninoff, Feodor Chaliapin and others; portraits of revolutionary politicians and leaders of the USSR, among which 35 portraits are of Vladimir Lenin, which were made between 1918 and 1922, and also portraits of Semyon Budyonny, Mikhail Frunze, Kliment Voroshilov, Clara Zetkin, Mikhail Kalinin, Joseph Stalin, Nikita Khrushchev, Yakov Sverdlov, Sergei Kirov, Vyacheslav Molotov, Valerian Kuybyshev. From the pictures taken by Otsup the bas-relief was made for the Order of Lenin and the images of Lenin were used on ruble banknotes.

Otsup was the only photojournalist that took pictures of the Second Congress of Soviets. From 1918 to 1921, during the Russian Civil War, he was taking pictures at battlefronts. From 1918 to 1935 he was the Kremlin's photographer. From 1919 to 1925 he was working in the All-Russian Central Executive Committee. From 1925 to 1935 he was responsible for the photography studio Russian Central council of labor unions.

== Death ==
He died in 1963 in Moscow, Soviet Union.

== Publications ==
- Антология советской фотографии / Antologiâ sovetskoï fotografii. = Anthology of Soviet Photography. Vol. 1, 1917-1940; Vol. 2, 1941-1945. Moscow: Izdatelstvo Planeta. OCLC 468241289. In Russian.
- Prostranstvo Revoliutsii: Rossiia. 1917-1941 = Field of the Revolution: Russia. 1917-1941. Moscow: Moscow Museum of Modern Art, 2007. ISBN 9785901124338. In English and Russian.

== Collections ==
Otsup's work is held in the following public collection:

- Metropolitan Museum of Art, New York City: 3 prints (as of August 2018)

== Awards ==
- August 29, 1947 – the Order of the Red Banner of Labour
- May 4, 1962 – the Order of Lenin
