= Pyotr Bazanov =

Hero of the Soviet Union (1923–2003)

Pyotr Vasilievich Bazanov
- Пётр Васильевич Базанов
- Born: 10 January 1923; Rameshki, Moscow Oblast, RSFSR
- Died: 4 September 2003 (aged 80); Moscow, Soviet Union
- Military career
- Allegiance: Soviet Union
- Branch: Soviet Air Force
- Service years: 1941 — 1985
- Rank: Lieutenant General
- Unit: 3rd Guards Fighter Aviation Regiment
- Conflicts: World War II; Eastern Front
- Awards: Hero of the Soviet Union

Pyotr Vasilievich Bazanov (Russian: Пётр Васильевич Базанов; 10 January 1923 – 4 September 2003) was a Soviet fighter pilot and flying ace in the 3rd Guards Fighter Aviation Regiment of the 235th Fighter Division in the 10th Fighter Aviation Corps of the 2nd Air Army on the 1st Ukrainian Front during the Second World War. For his actions in the military he was awarded the title Hero of the Soviet Union on 26 October 1944. He gained 18 individual aerial victories and six shared aerial victories in the war.

== Early life ==
Bazanov was born on 10 January 1923 in Rameshki village in the Moscow Oblast to a Russian family. In 1934 the family moved to Lubin where he attended secondary school; after graduating, he worked at a factory and as an automobile mechanic before starting his aviation career. After training at the Podolsky flight club he joined the military in January 1941; he became a member of the Communist Party of the Soviet Union in 1942.

== Military career ==
After joining the military in February 1941 he underwent further training at the Kacha Higher Military Aviation School where he flew Yakovlev UT-2 and Polikarpov I-16 aircraft before he graduated in July 1942. After the start of the Second World War he was deployed to the warfront in September as a deputy squadron commander of the 3rd Guards Fighter Aviation Regiment, flying a Lavochkin La-5. He flew in the battles on the 1st Ukrainian, 4th Ukrainian, Kalinin, Stalingrad, North Caucasian, Southern, and Voronezh Fronts. Throughout the war he conducted 362 sorties which included 60 aerial battles, 18 individual shootdowns, and six shared shootdowns, for which he was awarded the title Hero of the Soviet Union on 26 October 1944. He attained the rank of captain in 1944 and the rank of major in 1945.

After the war Bazanov remained in the airforce, graduating from the Liptesk Airborne Officers Tactical School in 1946. He became a skilled pilot of Yak-15, MiG-9, MiG-15 and later the MiG-17, MiG-19, MiG-21, MiG-23, among other newly introduced jet aircraft he trained regiments to fly. He became a Lieutenant Colonel in 1954 and eventually a Lieutenant General of Aviation in 1973, having graduated the Air Force Academy of Monino in 1958, and The Air Force Higher Academic Courses in 1973. He assisted the development of air defenses in the newly formed People's Republic of China from March 1952 to June 1953, and held the following positions until he retired: Commander of the 86th Guards Fighter Aviation Regiment in Odessa from 1958 to 1960; Deputy commander of the 16th Guards Fighter Aviation Regiment from 1960 to 1964; Commander of the 126th Fighter Division in East Germany from 1964 to 1967; Deputy training commander from 1967 to 1972; Commander of the 1st Far East Air Army in Khabarovsk from 1972 to 1974; Deputy commander of combat training from 1974 to 1981; and the Head of the Air Force Safety Division from 1981 until his retirement in 1985. In 1966 he was awarded the title Honoured Military Pilot of the USSR for his work in the Airforce among other high awards.

== Later life ==
After leaving the military he worked at the Mil Moscow Helicopter Plant where he took part in the development of several helicopter designs. He was buried in the Troyekurovskoye Cemetery after he died on 4 September 2003.

== Awards and honors ==
- Hero of the Soviet Union
- Order of Lenin
- Order of the October Revolution
- Two Orders of the Red Banner
- Three Orders of the Patriotic War in the 1st Class
- Three Orders of the Red Star
- Medal "For Battle Merit"
- Order "For Service to the Homeland in the Armed Forces of the USSR" 3rd Class
- Honoured Military Pilot of the USSR
- campaign and jubilee medals

== See also ==
- Hero of the Soviet Union
- Soviet Air Forces
- Aerial warfare
