= Aleksei Shaposhnikov (footballer) =

Soviet footballer

Personal information
- Full name: Aleksei Nikolayevich Shaposhnikov
- Date of birth: 16 March 1899
- Place of birth: Nikolskoye, Pokrovsky Uyezd, Vladimir Governorate, Russian Empire
- Date of death: 4 July 1962 (aged 63)
- Place of death: Moscow, USSR
- Position: Striker

Senior career*
Years	Team	Apps	(Gls)
1917–1918	Krasnoye Orekhovo Orekhovo-Zuyevo		
1919–1921	ZKS Moscow		
1924–1926	Krasnoye Orekhovo Orekhovo-Zuyevo		
1927	Tryokhgorka Moscow		
1928	Pischeviki Moscow		
1929–1930	RDPK Moscow		
1931–1933	AMO Moscow		

International career
1924–1925	USSR	2	(0)
- * Club domestic league appearances and goals

Aleksei Nikolayevich Shaposhnikov (Russian: Алексе́й Никола́евич Ша́пошников) (16 March 1899 – 4 July 1962) was a Soviet football player.

== Honours ==
- RSFSR Champion: 1920, 1927
- USSR Champion: 1920, 1923

== International career ==
Shaposhnikov made his debut for USSR on November 16, 1924, in a friendly against Turkey.
