= Pyotr Isakov =

Soviet footballer and manager

Personal information
- Full name: Pyotr Yefimovich Isakov
- Date of birth: 1900
- Place of birth: Nikolskoye, Pokrov Uyezd, Vladimir Governorate, Russian Empire
- Date of death: 3 April 1957 (aged 56–57)
- Place of death: Moscow, USSR
- Position: Striker

Senior career*
Years	Team	Apps	(Gls)
1916—1922	ZKS Moscow		
1923—1925	Krasnaya Presnya Moscow		
1926—1930	Pishcheviki Moscow		
1931	Promkooperatsiya Moscow		
1932—1933	Dukat Moscow		

International career
1924—1925	USSR	2	(0)

Managerial career
- 1934: Promkooperatsiya Moscow (assistant)
- 1935—1941: FC Spartak Moscow (assistant)
- 1943—1944: FC Spartak Moscow (assistant)
- 1945: FC Spartak Moscow
- 1945—1948: FC Spartak Moscow (assistant)
- * Club domestic league appearances and goals

Pyotr Yefimovich Isakov (Russian: Пётр Ефимович Исаков; July 1900 in Nikolskoye, Pokrov Uyezd, Vladimir Governorate – 3 April 1957 in Moscow) was a Soviet football player and manager.

== International career ==
Isakov made his debut for USSR on 16 November 1924 in a friendly against Turkey.
