= Pavel Kanunnikov =

Soviet footballer

Personal information
- Full name: Pavel Aleksandrovich Kanunnikov
- Date of birth: June 2, 1898
- Place of birth: village Zolotovo, Bronnitsy Uyezd, Moscow Governorate
- Date of death: April 17, 1974 (aged 75)
- Place of death: Moscow, USSR
- Position: Striker

Senior career*
Years	Team	Apps	(Gls)
1914	RKS Moscow		
1915–1918	Novogireyevo Moscow		
1919, 1921	KFS Moscow		
1922	MKS Moscow		
1923–1925	Krasnaya Presnya Moscow		
1926–1928	Pishcheviki Moscow		
1929–1930	KOR Moscow		

International career
1925	USSR	1	(0)
- * Club domestic league appearances and goals

Pavel Aleksandrovich Kanunnikov (Russian: Павел Александрович Канунников; June 2, 1898 in village Zolotovo, Bronnitsy Uyezd, Moscow Governorate – April 17, 1974 in Moscow) was a Soviet football player.

== Honours ==
- RSFSR champion: 1922, 1928.

== International career ==
Kanunnikov played his only game for USSR on May 15, 1925 in a friendly against Turkey.
