= Pyotr Grigoryev =

Soviet footballer

Personal information
- Full name: Pyotr Grigoryevich Grigoryev
- Date of birth: 3 January 1899
- Place of birth: Saint Petersburg, Russia
- Date of death: 12 November 1942 (aged 43)
- Place of death: Leningrad, USSR
- Position: Striker

Senior career*
Years	Team	Apps	(Gls)
1917	Murzinka Petrograd		
1921–1923	Merkur Petrograd		
1924–1926	Spartak Tsentralny Rayon Leningrad		
1927–1928	V.I. Lenin Club Leningrad		
1929	Khalturin Factory Leningrad		
1930–1938	Elektrik Leningrad		

International career
1924–1925	USSR	2	(0)
- * Club domestic league appearances and goals

Pyotr Grigoryevich Grigoryev (Russian: Петр Григорьевич Григорьев; 3 January 1899 – 12 November 1942) was a Soviet football player. He died in Leningrad during the Second World War siege of that city.

== Honours ==
- RSFSR champion: 1924.
- USSR champion: 1931

== International career ==
Grigoryev made his debut for USSR on 16 November 1924 in a friendly against Turkey.
