= 2000 Russian Top Division =

9th season of top-tier football league in Russia

Russian Top Division
- Season: 2000
- Champions: Spartak Moscow; 8th Russian title
- Relegated: Lokomotiv N.N. Elista
- Matches: 240
- Goals: 582 (2.43 per match)
- Top goalscorer: Dmitri Loskov (15 goals)

Spartak Moscow won their fifth consecutive Russian title, and eighth overall.

== Overview ==
Team	Head coach
FC Spartak Moscow	Oleg Romantsev
FC Lokomotiv Moscow	Yuri Syomin
FC Torpedo Moscow	Vitaliy Shevchenko
FC Anzhi Makhachkala	Gadzhi Gadzhiyev
FC Dynamo Moscow	Valery Gazzaev
FC Chernomorets Novorossiysk	Anatoly Baidachny
FC Zenit St. Petersburg	Anatoli Davydov (until April); Yuri Morozov (from April)
PFC CSKA Moscow	Oleg Dolmatov (until May); Pavel Sadyrin (from May)
FC Saturn Ramenskoye	Sergei Pavlov
FC Alania Vladikavkaz	Vladimir Gutsaev (Georgia (country)) (until May); Aleksandr Yanovskiy (caretaker) (May); Aleksandr Averyanov (from May)
FC Rotor Volgograd	Georgi Yartsev (until June); Yevhen Kucherevskyi (Ukraine) (from June)
FC Rostselmash Rostov-on-Don	Sergey Andreyev
FC Fakel Voronezh	Valeri Nenenko
FC Krylia Sovetov Samara	Alexander Tarkhanov
FC Lokomotiv Nizhny Novgorod	Valeri Ovchinnikov (until June); Nikolai Kozin (caretaker) (June to July); Valeri Ovchinnikov (from July)
FC Uralan Elista	Aleksandr Averyanov (until May); Vladimir Dergach (May); Aleksandr Irkhin (May to June); Boris Bunjak (Serbia) (from June)

== Standings ==
Pos	Team	Pld	W	D	L	GF	GA	GD	Pts	Qualification or relegation
1	Spartak Moscow (C)	30	23	1	6	69	30	+39	70	Qualification to Champions League group stage
2	Lokomotiv Moscow	30	18	8	4	50	20	+30	62	Qualification to Champions League third qualifying round
3	Torpedo Moscow	30	16	7	7	42	29	+13	55	Qualification to UEFA Cup first round
4	Anzhi Makhachkala	30	15	7	8	44	31	+13	52	Qualification to UEFA Cup first round
5	Dynamo Moscow	30	14	8	8	45	35	+10	50	Qualification to UEFA Cup first round
6	Chernomorets Novorossiysk (Note: Chernomorets qualified for the UEFA Cup thanks to Lokomotiv winning the Russian Cup in 2001.)	30	13	10	7	47	28	+19	49	Qualification to UEFA Cup first round
7	Zenit St. Petersburg	30	13	8	9	38	26	+12	47	
8	CSKA Moscow	30	12	5	13	45	39	+6	41	
9	Saturn	30	10	10	10	26	29	−3	40	
10	Alania Vladikavkaz	30	10	8	12	34	36	−2	38	
11	Rotor Volgograd	30	8	8	14	35	54	−19	32	
12	Rostselmash	30	6	14	10	24	27	−3	32	
13	Fakel Voronezh	30	6	12	12	25	45	−20	30	
14	Krylia Sovetov Samara	30	8	5	17	25	45	−20	29	
15	Lokomotiv N.N. (R)	30	3	9	18	16	47	−31	18	Relegation to First Division
16	Uralan Elista (R)	30	2	6	22	17	61	−44	12	Relegation to First Division

Source: rsssf.com
Rules for classification: 1) points; 2) goal difference; 3) number of goals scored.
(C) Champions; (R) Relegated

== Results ==
Home \ Away	ALA	ANZ	CHE	CSK	DYN	FAK	KRY	LOK	LNN	ROS	ROT	SPA	SAT	TOR	URE	ZEN
Alania Vladikavkaz		2–3	1–0	2–1	0–1	1–1	4–3	0–0	1–1	2–0	2–0	1–2	2–2	2–1	1–1	1–0
Anzhi Makhachkala	2–0		2–1	4–1	2–2	4–0	1–0	1–0	4–0	1–0	1–1	0–2	2–0	0–0	2–1	3–2
Chernomorets Novorossiysk	1–1	3–0		3–0	4–0	3–1	3–0	0–3	2–0	1–2	3–0	1–4	1–1	1–0	3–1	1–1
CSKA Moscow	0–1	4–0	0–3		2–2	5–1	2–0	4–3	5–0	1–1	1–1	2–1	0–0	0–2	0–2	4–1
Dynamo Moscow	4–2	2–1	2–2	1–0		2–2	2–0	2–2	3–1	0–0	2–0	2–4	2–0	0–0	1–0	1–2
Fakel Voronezh	0–0	0–1	2–2	2–1	1–0		3–2	0–0	1–1	1–1	2–2	1–0	0–1	1–2	1–1	0–0
Krylia Sovetov Samara	1–0	1–1	0–0	2–0	0–2	1–1		0–2	2–1	0–3	0–1	1–2	3–2	3–2	1–0	0–1
Lokomotiv Moscow	1–0	1–0	0–3	1–0	1–0	1–0	2–0		2–0	3–0	4–1	3–2	1–0	0–3	9–0	1–1
Lokomotiv N.N.	1–1	1–4	0–0	1–2	0–3	1–0	1–0	0–1		0–0	0–1	0–2	0–0	0–1	2–0	1–2
Rostselmash	0–1	0–1	0–1	1–1	2–1	1–1	2–0	0–0	0–0		1–1	2–3	2–0	0–1	3–0	0–0
Rotor Volgograd	2–1	2–2	1–1	0–1	2–4	2–0	1–1	0–4	2–2	3–0		1–6	3–0	0–1	3–1	2–0
Spartak Moscow	3–1	1–0	3–1	1–0	3–1	3–1	1–2	0–0	3–1	1–0	5–2		3–0	4–2	2–0	1–2
Saturn	2–0	0–0	0–0	2–1	1–0	0–1	0–0	1–1	1–0	2–2	2–0	2–0		0–1	3–0	1–0
Torpedo Moscow	2–0	2–1	2–1	0–1	1–1	2–0	2–1	1–1	2–1	1–1	2–0	0–3	2–0		2–2	1–1
Uralan Elista	0–4	1–1	1–2	1–5	0–1	0–1	0–1	0–1	0–0	0–0	2–0	0–2	1–2	2–3		0–2
Zenit St. Petersburg	1–0	1–0	0–0	0–1	0–1	5–0	3–0	1–2	2–0	0–0	3–1	1–2	1–1	2–1	3–0	

Legend: Blue = home team win; Yellow = draw; Red = away team win.

== Season statistics ==
=== Top goalscorers ===
As of matches played on 12 November 2000.

Rank	Player	Club	Goals
1	(Russia) Dmitri Loskov	Lokomotiv Moscow	15
2	(Russia) Dmitri Kirichenko	Rostselmash	14
3	(Russia) Yegor Titov	Spartak Moscow	13
4	(Russia) Rolan Gusev	Dynamo	12
4	(Federal Republic of Yugoslavia) Predrag Ranđelović	Anzhi	12
6	(Ukraine) Oleksandr Pryzetko	Chernomorets	11
6	(Russia) Aleksandr Shirko	Spartak Moscow	11
8	(Russia) Vladimir Kulik	CSKA	10
8	(Ukraine) Hennadiy Popovych	Zenit	10
8	(Brazil) Robson	Spartak Moscow	10
8	(Azerbaijan) (Russia) Narvik Sirkhayev	Anzhi	10
8	(Russia) Bakhva Tedeyev	Alania	10

== Awards ==
On December 5 Russian Football Union named its list of 33 top players:

Goalkeepers

1. (Russia) Ruslan Nigmatullin (Lokomotiv Moscow)
2. (Russia) Aleksandr Filimonov (Spartak Moscow)
3. (Russia) Veniamin Mandrykin (Alania)

Sweepers

1. (Russia) Igor Chugainov (Lokomotiv Moscow)
2. (Russia) Dimitri Ananko (Spartak Moscow)
3. (Russia) Aleksei Katulsky (Zenit)

Right backs

1. (Ukraine) Dmytro Parfenov (Spartak Moscow)
2. (Cameroon) Jerry-Christian Tchuissé (Chernomorets / Spartak Moscow)
3. (Russia) Gennadiy Nizhegorodov (Lokomotiv Moscow)

Stoppers

1. (Russia) Yuri Drozdov (Lokomotiv Moscow)
2. (Russia) Yevgeni Varlamov (CSKA Moscow)
3. (Russia) Vitali Litvinov (Torpedo Moscow)

Left backs

1. (Russia) Yuri Kovtun (Spartak Moscow)
2. (Russia) Aleksandr Tochilin (Dynamo Moscow)
3. (Russia) Vadim Evseev (Lokomotiv Moscow)

Defensive midfielders

1. (Russia) Viktor Bulatov (Spartak Moscow)
2. (Bosnia and Herzegovina) Elvir Rahimić (Anzhi)
3. (Ukraine) Maksym Kalynychenko (Spartak Moscow)

Right wingers

1. (Russia) Rolan Gusev (Dynamo Moscow)
2. (Belarus) Vasili Baranov (Spartak Moscow)
3. (Russia) Valery Yesipov (Rotor)

Central midfielders

1. (Russia) Yegor Titov (Spartak Moscow)
2. (Russia) Dmitri Loskov (Lokomotiv Moscow)
3. (Ukraine) Oleksandr Pryzetko (Chernomorets)

Left wingers

1. (Azerbaijan) Narvik Sirkhayev (Anzhi)
2. (Belarus) Maksim Romaschenko (Dynamo Moscow)
3. (Russia) Artyom Bezrodny (Spartak Moscow)

Right forwards

1. (Russia) Aleksandr Panov (Zenit)
2. (Russia) Maksim Buznikin (Spartak Moscow / Saturn)
3. (Serbia) Predrag Ranđelović (Anzhi)

Left forwards

1. (Russia) Sergei Semak (CSKA Moscow)
2. (Brazil) Luis Robson (Spartak Moscow)
3. (Russia) Dmitri Kirichenko (Rostselmash)

== Medal squads ==
1. FC Spartak Moscow

Goalkeepers: Aleksandr Filimonov (23), Andrei Smetanin (7).
Defenders: Dmytro Parfenov (Ukraine) (25 / 4), Yevgeni Bushmanov (23), Aleksandr Shchyogolev (18 / 1), Yuri Kovtun (17 / 1), Dmitri Khlestov (14 / 1), Jerry-Christian Tchuissé (Cameroon) (10), Eduard Mor (8 / 1), Dmitri Ananko (6), Otar Khizaneishvili (Georgia (country)) (4), Oleg Kuzmin (1), Sergei Gurchenkov (1).
Midfielders: Viktor Bulatov (29 / 1), Andrey Tikhonov (25 / 1), Yegor Titov (24 / 13), Vasili Baranov (Belarus) (23 / 3), Maksym Kalynychenko (Ukraine) (17 / 4), Artyom Bezrodny (13 / 3), Andrejs Štolcers (Latvia) (11 / 5), Milan Jović (Serbia) (10), Valery Kechinov (3).
Forwards: Aleksandr Shirko (24 / 11), Luis Robson (Brazil) (24 / 10), Maksim Buznikin (15 / 6), Nikolai Pisarev (13 / 2), Marcão (Brazil) (7 / 1), Sergei Lebedkov (1), German Lovchev (1), Aleksandr Shchipkov (1 / 1).
(league appearances and goals listed in brackets)

Manager: Oleg Romantsev.

Transferred out during the season: Andrey Tikhonov (to (Israel) Maccabi Tel Aviv F.C.), Maksim Buznikin (to FC Saturn Ramenskoye), Dmitri Khlestov (to (Turkey) Beşiktaş J.K.), Milan Jović (Serbia) (to FC Chernomorets Novorossiysk), Eduard Mor (to FC Saturn Ramenskoye).

2. FC Lokomotiv Moscow

Goalkeepers: Ruslan Nigmatullin (29), Zaur Khapov (2).
Defenders: Igor Chugainov (30 / 3), Vadim Evseev (29 / 2), Gennadiy Nizhegorodov (26), Yuri Drozdov (25 / 1), Andrei Lavrik (Belarus) (23), Igor Cherevchenko (Tajikistan) (19 / 1), Andrei Solomatin (16 / 1), Dmitri Sennikov (13 / 2), Oleg Pashinin (Uzbekistan) (11).
Midfielders: Dmitri Loskov (26 / 15), Yevgeni Kharlachyov (22 / 4), Vladimir Maminov (Uzbekistan) (17 / 2), Albert Sarkisyan (Armenia) (17), Alexey Smertin (10 / 1), Ilya Tsymbalar (10), Juraj Dovičovič (Slovakia) (2).
Forwards: Dmitri Bulykin (22 / 3), Oleg Teryokhin (21 / 8), Zaza Janashia (Georgia (country)) (20 / 5), Ruslan Pimenov (13 / 1), Filipe Azevedo (France) (4), Oleh Haras (Ukraine) (4).

One own goal scored by Mikhail Mysin (FC Rotor Volgograd).

Manager: Yuri Syomin.

Transferred out during the season: Alexey Smertin (to (France) Bordeaux), Oleh Haras (Ukraine) (to FC Fakel Voronezh).

3. FC Torpedo Moscow

Goalkeepers: Yevgeni Kornyukhin (22), Valeriy Vorobyov (Ukraine) (8).
Defenders: Vitali Litvinov (29 / 2), Vyacheslav Dayev (29 / 1), Alyaksandar Lukhvich (Belarus) (27 / 2), Andrei Malay (26), Marat Makhmutov (16), Andriy Sapuha (Ukraine) (3), Sergei Burchenkov (3).
Midfielders: Andrei Gashkin (30 / 7), Vladimir Kazakov (28 / 2), Radaslaw Arlowski (Belarus) (22 / 3), Igor Semshov (18 / 1), Vladimir Leonchenko (14 / 1), Sergei Kormiltsev (Ukraine) (12), Pavlo Shkapenko (Ukraine) (10 / 1), Konstantin Zyryanov (5 / 3), Johann Duveau (France) (4 / 1), Aleksandr Ignatyev (4).
Forwards: Dmitri Vyazmikin (27 / 8), Arsen Avakov (Tajikistan) (23 / 3), Rimantas Žvingilas (Lithuania) (21 / 3), Valdas Trakys (Lithuania) (21 / 2), Mihai Drăguş (Romania) (7), Vyacheslav Kamoltsev (5), Maksim Aristarkhov (2 / 1).

One own goal scored by Aleksandr Cherkes (FC Fakel Voronezh).

Manager: Vitaly Shevchenko.

Transferred out during the season: Mihai Drăguş (Romania) , Aleksandr Ignatyev, Andriy Sapuha (Ukraine) (all to FC Lokomotiv Nizhny Novgorod).

== Attendances ==
#	Football club	Home games	Average attendance
1	Fakel Voronezh	15	23,573
2	FC Spartak Moscow	15	19,933
3	Krylia Sovetov Samara	15	18,667
4	Alania Vladikavkaz	15	18,333
5	FC Zenit	15	17,287
6	Anji Makhachkala	15	13,513
7	Chernomorets Novorossiysk	15	12,667
8	FC Saturn	15	11,600
9	Rostselmash	15	10,187
10	Rotor Volgograd	15	9,193
11	FC Dynamo Moscow	15	8,833
12	PFC CSKA Moscow	15	7,733
13	Lokomotiv Nizhny Novgorod	15	7,673
14	Uralan Elista	15	5,387
15	Lokomotiv Moscow	15	5,380
16	Torpedo Moscow	15	4,500

== See also ==
- 2000 in Russian football
