= Footballer of the Year in Baltic and Commonwealth of Independent States =

Footballer of the Year in Baltic and Commonwealth of Independent States (also known as the "Star award") was an annual award given by Sport-Express daily to the Baltic and Commonwealth of Independent States player of the season from 2004 to 2013. The title is awarded according to the results of a poll conducted by the newspaper.

== Winners ==
Year	Place	Player	Club	1st place	2nd place	3rd place	4th place	5th place	Total
2004	1	(Ukraine) Andriy Shevchenko	(Italy) Milan	45	-	-	-	-	225
2004	2	(Russia) Dmitri Sychev	(Russia) Lokomotiv Moscow	-	8	13	6	3	86
2004	3	(Russia) Alexey Smertin	(England) Chelsea	-	15	4	3	3	81
2004	4	(Latvia) Māris Verpakovskis	(Ukraine) Dynamo Kyiv	-	9	5	9	5	74
2004	5	(Ukraine) Andriy Voronin	(Germany) 1. FC Köln / (Germany) Bayer Leverkusen	-	5	2	3	2	34
2005	1	(Ukraine) Andriy Shevchenko	(Italy) Milan	39	6	-	-	-	219
2005	2	(Russia) Andrey Arshavin	(Russia) Zenit Saint Petersburg	2	13	8	4	5	99
2005	3	(Russia) Igor Akinfeev	(Russia) CSKA Moscow	2	8	8	5	5	81
2005	4	(Georgia (country)) Shota Arveladze	(Scotland) Rangers / (Netherlands) AZ	-	3	9	7	4	57
2005	5	(Belarus) Alexander Hleb	(Germany) VfB Stuttgart / (England) Arsenal	-	4	6	10	2	56
2006	1	(Russia) Igor Akinfeev	(Russia) CSKA Moscow	14	11	5	3	6	141
2006	2	(Belarus) Alexander Hleb	(England) Arsenal	11	9	11	5	2	136
2006	3	(Ukraine) Andriy Shevchenko	(Italy) Milan / (England) Chelsea	7	13	8	4	2	121
2006	4	(Russia) Andrey Arshavin	(Russia) Zenit Saint Petersburg	7	2	6	8	8	85
2006	5	(Georgia (country)) Shota Arveladze	(Netherlands) AZ	1	3	5	7	12	58
2007	1	(Russia) Andrey Arshavin	(Russia) Zenit Saint Petersburg	14	10	6	6	4	144
2007	2	(Russia) Aleksandr Kerzhakov	(Spain) Sevilla	9	11	4	3	3	110
2007	3	(Belarus) Alexander Hleb	(England) Arsenal	9	7	7	5	3	107
2007	4	(Ukraine) Anatoliy Tymoshchuk	(Ukraine) Shakhtar Donetsk / (Russia) Zenit Saint Petersburg	2	7	8	4	6	76
2007	5	(Russia) Roman Pavlyuchenko	(Russia) Spartak Moscow	4	4	6	7	1	69
2008	1	(Russia) Andrey Arshavin	(Russia) Zenit Saint Petersburg	32	9	3	1	-	207
2008	2	(Russia) Yuri Zhirkov	(Russia) CSKA Moscow	6	10	12	5	1	117
2008	3	(Ukraine) Anatoliy Tymoshchuk	(Russia) Zenit Saint Petersburg	3	16	3	4	6	102
2008	4	(Russia) Roman Pavlyuchenko	(Russia) Spartak Moscow / (England) Tottenham Hotspur	-	5	8	6	3	59
2008	5	(Russia) Igor Akinfeev	(Russia) CSKA Moscow	1	3	6	5	2	47
2009	1	(Russia) Andrey Arshavin	(England) Arsenal	31	11	1	1	-	204
2009	2	(Russia) Igor Akinfeev	(Russia) CSKA Moscow	6	14	7	8	5	128
2009	3	(Ukraine) Andriy Pyatov	(Ukraine) Shakhtar Donetsk	-	4	11	3	1	56
2009	4	(Ukraine) Dmytro Chyhrynskyi	(Ukraine) Shakhtar Donetsk / (Spain) Barcelona	1	3	5	5	4	46
2009	5	(Russia) Sergey Ryzhikov	(Russia) Rubin Kazan	2	3	5	2	2	43
2010	1	(Russia) Alexander Kerzhakov	(Russia) Zenit Saint Petersburg	13	11	6	6	2	141
2010	2	(Russia) Andrey Arshavin	(England) Arsenal	13	8	4	4	8	125
2010	3	(Russia) Roman Pavlyuchenko	(England) Tottenham Hotspur F.C.	10	7	8	9	3	123
2010	4	(Ukraine) Oleksandr Aliyev	(Russia) Lokomotiv Moscow	4	7	4	3	2	68
2010	5	(Russia) Igor Akinfeev	(Russia) CSKA Moscow	2	8	3	3	2	59
2011	1	(Ukraine) Andriy Voronin	(Russia) Dynamo Moscow	23	6	10	2	2	175
2011	2	(Russia) Aleksandr Kerzhakov	(Russia) Zenit Saint Petersburg	9	11	5	7	1	119
2011	3	(Russia) Vyacheslav Malafeev	(Russia) Zenit Saint Petersburg	3	8	3	29	3	63
2011	4	(Ukraine) Anatoliy Tymoshchuk	(Germany) Bayern Munich	-	6	7	6	4	61
2011	5	(Russia) Alan Dzagoev	(Russia) CSKA Moscow	-	2	3	4	8	33
2012	1	(Armenia) Henrikh Mkhitaryan	(Ukraine) Shakhtar Donetsk	22	8	8	3	-	296
2012	2	(Russia) Aleksandr Kerzhakov	(Russia) Zenit Saint Petersburg	3	8	7	5	6	263
2012	3	(Russia) Igor Akinfeev	(Russia) CSKA Moscow	5	4	8	1	7	130
2012	4	(Russia) Igor Denisov	(Russia) Zenit Saint Petersburg	1	4	5	5	5	111
2012	5	(Russia) Aleksandr Kokorin	(Russia) Dynamo Moscow	4	2	3	4	3	103
2013	1	(Armenia) Henrikh Mkhitaryan	(Germany) Borussia Dortmund	–					

== Wins by player ==
Name	Wins	Winning years
(Russia) Andrey Arshavin	3	2007, 2008, 2009
(Armenia) Henrikh Mkhitaryan	2	2012, 2013
(Ukraine) Andriy Shevchenko	2	2004, 2005
(Russia) Igor Akinfeev	1	2006
(Russia) Aleksandr Kerzhakov	1	2010
(Ukraine) Andriy Voronin	1	2011

== See also ==
- Soviet Footballer of the Year
- Footballer of the Year in Russia (Sport-Express) - "Sport Express" daily sports newspaper version.
- Footballer of the Year in Russia (Futbol) - "Futbol" weekly magazine version.
