= Russian Footballer of the Year =

Russian Footballer of the Year may refer to:

- Footballer of the Year in Russia (Futbol)
- Footballer of the Year in Russia (Sport-Express)

== See also ==
- Soviet Footballer of the Year
