= 2000 in Russian football =

Football in Russia
- Season: 2000

Men's football
- Top Division: Spartak Moscow
- First Division: Sokol Saratov
- Second Division: Severstal Cherepovets (West); Khimki (Centre); Svetotekhnika Saransk (Povolzhye); Kuban Krasnodar (South); Neftekhimik Nizhnekamsk (Ural); Metallurg Novokuznetsk (East)
- Russian Cup: Lokomotiv Moscow

2000 in Russian football saw the eighth title for FC Spartak Moscow and the third Cup for FC Lokomotiv Moscow. The national team began qualification for the 2002 FIFA World Cup.

== National team ==
Russia national football team began qualification for the 2002 FIFA World Cup.

Date	Venue	Opponents	Score^{1}	Competition	Russia scorers	Match Report
23 February 2000	Qiryat Eliezer Stadium, Haifa (A)	Israel	1–4	F	Vladimir Beschastnykh	Sport-Express
26 April 2000	Dynamo Stadium, Moscow (H)	United States	2–0	F	Egor Titov, Valery Karpin	Sport-Express
31 May 2000	Dynamo Stadium, Moscow (H)	Slovakia	1–1	F	Vladimir Beschastnykh	Sport-Express
4 June 2000	Stadionul Republican, Chişinău (A)	Moldova	1–0	F	Maksim Buznikin	Sport-Express
16 August 2000	Luzhniki Stadium, Moscow (H)	Israel	1–0	F	Maksim Buznikin	Sport-Express
2 September 2000	Hardturm, Zürich (A)	Switzerland	1–0	WCQ	Vladimir Beschastnykh	rsssf Sport-Express
11 October 2000	Dynamo Stadium, Moscow (H)	Luxembourg	3–0	WCQ	Maksim Buznikin, Dmitri Khokhlov, Egor Titov	rsssf Sport-Express

1. Russia score given first

Key

- H = Home match
- A = Away match
- F = Friendly
- WCQ = 2002 FIFA World Cup qualifying, UEFA Group 1

== Leagues ==
=== Top Division ===
Pos	Team	Pld	W	D	L	GF	GA	GD	Pts	Qualification or relegation
1	Spartak Moscow (C)	30	23	1	6	69	30	+39	70	Qualification to Champions League group stage
2	Lokomotiv Moscow	30	18	8	4	50	20	+30	62	Qualification to Champions League third qualifying round
3	Torpedo Moscow	30	16	7	7	42	29	+13	55	Qualification to UEFA Cup first round
4	Anzhi Makhachkala	30	15	7	8	44	31	+13	52	Qualification to UEFA Cup first round
5	Dynamo Moscow	30	14	8	8	45	35	+10	50	Qualification to UEFA Cup first round
6	Chernomorets Novorossiysk (Note: Chernomorets qualified for the UEFA Cup thanks to Lokomotiv winning the Russian Cup in 2001.)	30	13	10	7	47	28	+19	49	Qualification to UEFA Cup first round
7	Zenit St. Petersburg	30	13	8	9	38	26	+12	47	
8	CSKA Moscow	30	12	5	13	45	39	+6	41	
9	Saturn	30	10	10	10	26	29	−3	40	
10	Alania Vladikavkaz	30	10	8	12	34	36	−2	38	
11	Rotor Volgograd	30	8	8	14	35	54	−19	32	
12	Rostselmash	30	6	14	10	24	27	−3	32	
13	Fakel Voronezh	30	6	12	12	25	45	−20	30	
14	Krylia Sovetov Samara	30	8	5	17	25	45	−20	29	
15	Lokomotiv N.N. (R)	30	3	9	18	16	47	−31	18	Relegation to First Division
16	Uralan Elista (R)	30	2	6	22	17	61	−44	12	Relegation to First Division

Source: rsssf.com
Rules for classification: 1) points; 2) goal difference; 3) number of goals scored.
(C) Champions; (R) Relegated

=== First Division ===
Sokol and Torpedo-ZIL were promoted to the Top Division for the first time after occupying two top positions in the First Division.

Pos	Team	Pld	W	D	L	GF	GA	GD	Pts	Promotion or relegation
1	Sokol Saratov (P)	38	28	5	5	75	27	+48	89	Promotion to Top Division
2	Torpedo-ZIL Moscow (P)	38	24	8	6	59	28	+31	80	Promotion to Top Division
3	Rubin Kazan	38	24	6	8	58	28	+30	78	
4	Shinnik Yaroslavl	38	20	11	7	55	33	+22	71	
5	Kristall Smolensk	38	19	4	15	60	49	+11	61	
6	Amkar Perm	38	17	9	12	50	38	+12	60	
7	Gazovik-Gazprom Izhevsk	38	18	5	15	52	52	0	59	
8	Lokomotiv Chita	38	16	5	17	47	51	−4	53	
9	Lada-Togliatti	38	14	10	14	55	49	+6	52	
10	Tom Tomsk	38	14	10	14	33	28	+5	52	
11	Arsenal Tula	38	13	13	12	42	39	+3	52	
12	Baltika Kaliningrad	38	15	6	17	37	46	−9	51	
13	Volgar-Gazprom Astrakhan	38	13	12	13	43	39	+4	51	
14	Metallurg Krasnoyarsk	38	15	5	18	37	49	−12	50	
15	Spartak Nalchik	38	13	9	16	34	44	−10	48	
16	Nosta Novotroitsk (R)	38	12	10	16	41	51	−10	46	Relegation to Second Division
17	Zhemchuzhina Sochi (R)	38	12	7	19	45	70	−25	43	Relegation to Second Division
18	Metallurg Lipetsk (R)	38	10	9	19	40	53	−13	39	Relegation to Second Division
19	Spartak-Chukotka Moscow (Note: FC Spartak-Chukotka Moscow were excluded from the division after playing 19 games and gaining 16 points due to lack of financing. All the remaining opponents were awarded a 3-0 win. They did not participate in any national-level competitions in 2001.) (R)	38	4	4	30	29	58	−29	16	Relegation to Second Division
20	Lokomotiv St. Petersburg (Note: FC Lokomotiv St. Petersburg lost professional status and played in the Russian Amateur Football League in 2001.) (R)	38	3	4	31	27	87	−60	13	Relegation to Second Division

Source: PFL, RSSSF
(P) Promoted; (R) Relegated
Notes:

Andrey Fedkov of Sokol became the top goalscorer with 26 goals.

=== Second Division ===
Of six clubs that finished first in their respective Second Division zones, three play-off winners were promoted to the First Division:

Team 1	Agg.	Team 2	1st leg	2nd leg
FC Severstal Cherepovets (West)	3–3	FC Khimki (Centre)	1–0	2–3
FC Svetotekhnika Saransk (Povolzhye)	0–1	FC Kuban Krasnodar (South)	0–1	0–0
FC Neftekhimik Nizhnekamsk (Ural)	4–1	FC Metallurg Novokuznetsk (East)	2–0	2–1

However, later Severstal refused promotion, and their place was taken by Khimki.

== Cup ==
The Russian Cup was won by Lokomotiv Moscow, who beat CSKA Moscow 3–2 after extra time.

== UEFA club competitions ==
=== UEFA Cup 1999–2000 ===
Spartak Moscow played in the third round of the 1999–2000 UEFA Cup, where they lost to Leeds United A.F.C. on away goals.

=== UEFA Intertoto Cup 2000 ===
Zenit Saint Petersburg reached the final of the UEFA Intertoto Cup 2000 after eliminating NK Primorje, Tatabánya FC, and Bradford City A.F.C. In the final, Zenit lost 3–4 on aggregate to Celta de Vigo.

=== UEFA Champions League 2000-01 ===
Lokomotiv Moscow failed to qualify for the group stage of the 2000–01 UEFA Champions League, losing 1–6 on aggregate to Beşiktaş J.K. in the third qualifying round.

Spartak Moscow, who qualified for the group stage automatically, finished in the second position, one point behind Real Madrid in Group A which also contained Bayer Leverkusen and Sporting Clube de Portugal.

=== UEFA Cup 2000-01 ===
Of the four Russian clubs which played in the 2000–01 UEFA Cup, only Lokomotiv Moscow qualified for the second round. Torpedo Moscow lost 2–5 on aggregate to Lausanne Sports, CSKA Moscow 0–1 to Viborg FF (after extra time), and Spartak Vladikavkaz 0–5 to Amica Wronki.

Lokomotiv overcome PFC Naftex Burgas in the first round and FK Inter Bratislava in the second round, qualifying for the spring phase of the UEFA Cup.
