= Ruslan Nigmatullin =

Russian footballer

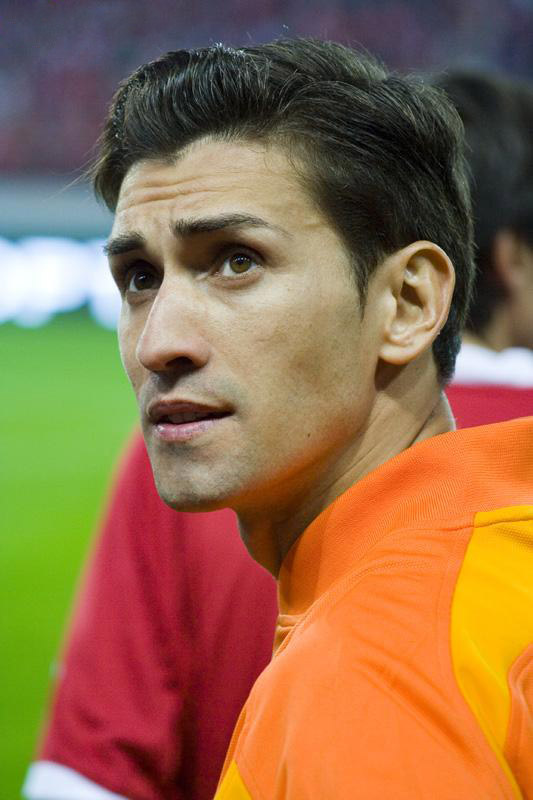
- Nigmatullin in 2008

Personal information
- Full name: Ruslan Karimovich Nigmatullin
- Date of birth: 7 October 1974 (age 52)
- Place of birth: Kazan, Soviet Union
- Height: 1.87 m (6 ft 1 1/2 in)
- Position: Goalkeeper

Senior career*
Years	Team	Apps	(Gls)
1992–1994	KAMAZ	20	(0)
1995–1997	Spartak Moscow	27	(0)
1998–2001	Lokomotiv Moscow	115	(0)
2002–2004	Hellas Verona	10	(0)
2002	→ CSKA Moscow (loan)	14	(0)
2003	→ Salernitana (loan)	14	(0)
2004	Lokomotiv Moscow	1	(0)
2005	Terek Grozny	19	(0)
2008	SKA Rostov	15	(0)
2009	Anzhi Makhachkala	0	(0)
2009	Lokomotiv-2 Moscow	8	(0)
2009	Maccabi Ahi Nazareth	9	(0)
Total		263	(0)

International career
1994–1995	Russia U-21	10	(0)
2000–2002	Russia	24	(0)
- * Club domestic league appearances and goals

Ruslan Karimovich Nigmatullin (Russian: Русла́н Кари́мович Нигмату́ллин, IPA: [rʊˈslan kɐˈrʲiməvʲɪtɕ nʲɪɡmɐˈtulʲɪn], Tatar: Руслан Кәрим улы Нигъмәтуллин; born 7 October 1974 in Kazan, Tatar Autonomous Soviet Socialist Republic, Soviet Union) is a Russian former association footballer of Volga Tatar ethnicity who played goalkeeper and is currently working as a DJ. He has appeared for the Russian national team 24 times (including 5 Olympic appearances) and was their starting keeper at the 2002 World Cup. He was voted Russian Player of the Year 2001 and is considered the best Russian goalkeeper of his period.

He is also known as a DJ after completing his football career.

== Biography ==
=== Retirement ===
Despite officially retiring from football in February 2006, in September 2008, Nigmatullin decided to make a deal with FC SKA Rostov-on-Don, Russian club from First Division. After playing for another year for 3 clubs, he retired again in November 2009.

=== Time in Israel ===
Nigmatullin signed with Israeli club, Maccabi Ahi Nazareth for the 2009–10 season. His start was a shaky one but his performance improved over the weeks as he acclimated to Israel. Nevertheless, he requested to leave the club in November 2009.

== Honours ==
- Russian Premier League champion: 1996, 1997, 2004.
- Russian Premier League runner-up: 1999, 2000, 2001, 2002.
- Russian Premier League bronze: 1995, 1998.
- Russian Cup winner: 2000, 2001.
- Russian Cup finalist: 1998.

== Career statistics ==
Club performance			League		Cup		League Cup		Continental		Total	
Season	Club	League	Apps	Goals	Apps	Goals	Apps	Goals	Apps	Goals	Apps	Goals
Russia			League		Russian Cup		League Cup		Europe		Total	
1992	KAMAZ Naberezhnye Chelny	First Division	7	0								
1993	KAMAZ Naberezhnye Chelny	Premier League	1	0								
1994	KAMAZ Naberezhnye Chelny	Premier League	11	0								
1995	Spartak Moscow	Premier League	15	0								
1996	Spartak Moscow	Premier League	10	0								
1997	Spartak Moscow	Premier League	2	0								
1998	Lokomotiv Moscow	Premier League	30	0								
1999	Lokomotiv Moscow	Premier League	29	0								
2000	Lokomotiv Moscow	Premier League	29	0								
2001	Lokomotiv Moscow	Premier League	27	0								
Italy			League		Coppa Italia		League Cup		Europe		Total	
2001–02	Hellas Verona	Serie A	1	0								
Russia			League		Russian Cup		League Cup		Europe		Total	
2002	CSKA Moscow	Premier League	14	0								
Italy			League		Coppa Italia		League Cup		Europe		Total	
2002–03	Salernitana	Serie B	14	0								
2003–04	Hellas Verona	Serie B	9	0								
Russia			League		Russian Cup		League Cup		Europe		Total	
2004	Lokomotiv Moscow	Premier League	1	0								
2005	Terek Grozny	Premier League	19	0								
Israel			League		Israel State Cup		Toto Cup		Europe		Total	
2009–10	Maccabi Ahi Nazareth	Ligat ha'Al	9	0	0	0	5	0	0	0	14	0
Total	Russia		196	0								
Total	Italy		24	0								
Total	Israel		9	0	0	0	5	0	0	0	14	0
Career total			229	0								

== Footnotes ==
Preceded by Yegor Titov	Futbol Russian Footballer of the Year; 2001	Succeeded by Dmitri Loskov
Preceded by Yegor Titov	Sport-Express Russian Footballer of the Year; 2001	Succeeded by Dmitri Loskov
