= Igor Akinfeev =

Russian footballer (born 1986)

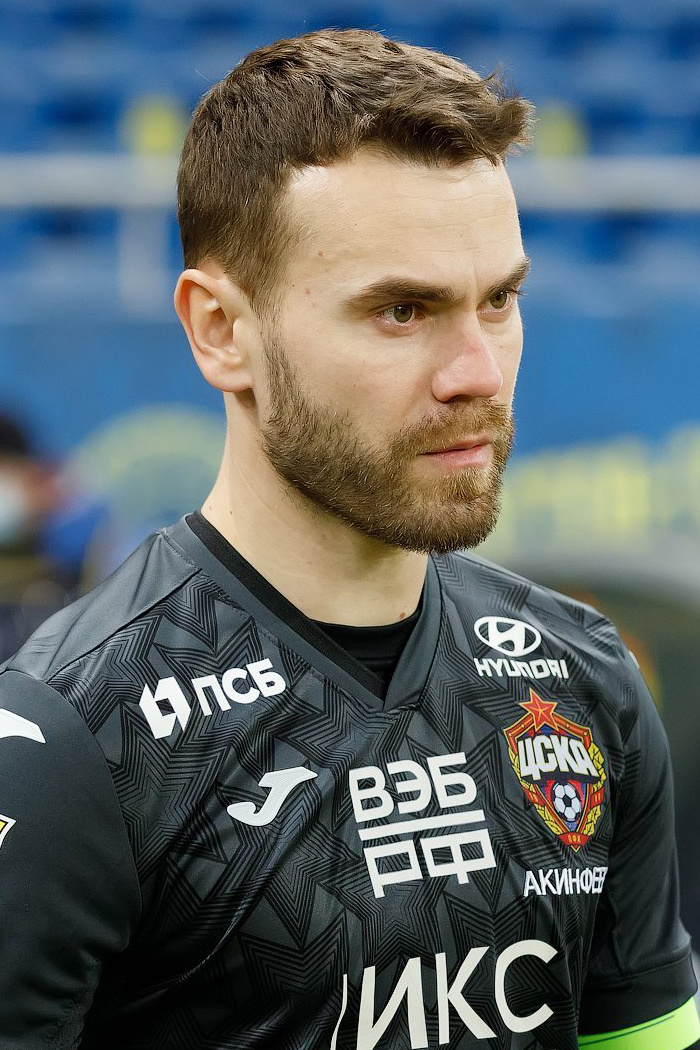
- Akinfeev with CSKA Moscow in 2020

Personal information
- Full name: Igor Vladimirovich Akinfeev
- Date of birth: 8 April 1986 (age 40)
- Place of birth: Vidnoye, Russian SFSR, Soviet Union
- Height: 1.85 m (6 ft 1 in)
- Position: Goalkeeper

Team information
- Current team: CSKA Moscow
- Number: 35

Youth career
- 1991–2002: CSKA Moscow

Senior career*
Years	Team	Apps	(Gls)
2003–	CSKA Moscow	615	(0)

International career
2001	Russia U15 (Note: Igor Akinfeev took part in the U-15 Druzhba Tournament in 2001 and, being named the best goalkeeper of the tournament, he must have played in at least in 3 of the 5 matches Russia U15 played in the tournament.) (Note: Igor Akinfeev, additionally, played several matches for an U15 selection from clubs of Moscow in 2001.)	3+	(0)
2002–2005	Russia U21	8	(0)
2003	Russia U17 (Note: Igor Akinfeev played in 2 matches for Russia U17 in the Elite Round of the 2003 UEFA European Under-17 Championship qualification.)	2	(0)
2003–2018	Russia	111	(0)
2004	Russian Football Premier League XI	1	(0)
Medal record
Men's football
Representing Russia
UEFA European Championship
Bronze medal – third place	2008 Austria–Switzerland
- * Club domestic league appearances and goals as of 4 April 2026

Igor Vladimirovich Akinfeev (Russian: Игорь Владимирович Акинфеев, IPA: [ˈiɡərʲ vlɐˈdʲimʲɪrəvʲɪtɕ ɐkʲɪnˈfʲe(j)ɪf]; born 8 April 1986) is a Russian professional footballer who plays as a goalkeeper for and captains Russian Premier League club CSKA Moscow.

A one-club man, Akinfeev has played for CSKA Moscow since making his senior debut for the club in 2003, and holds the records for the most appearances in the Russian top division as well as the most clean sheets in Russian football. With CSKA, he has won six Russian Premier League titles, eight Russian Cups, and the 2004-05 UEFA Cup.

Akinfeev represented Russia internationally from 2004 to 2018, earning 111 caps, and was selected for four UEFA European Championships and two FIFA World Cups. In 2017, he was named captain of the national team, following the international retirement of Vasili Berezutski. He helped Russia reach the semi-finals of UEFA Euro 2008 and the quarter-finals of the 2018 FIFA World Cup.

== Early life ==
Igor Akinfeev was born on 8 April 1986 in the town of Vidnoye, Moscow Oblast. He was enrolled by his father at CSKA Moscow's sports school at the age of four. He began training as a goalkeeper during his second session. As a member of the junior CSKA Moscow team, he won the Russian Junior Championship in 2002.

== Club career ==
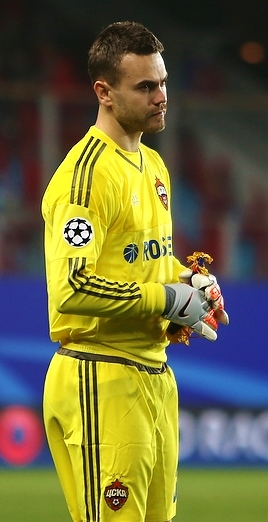
Akinfeev playing for CSKA Moscow in October 2015

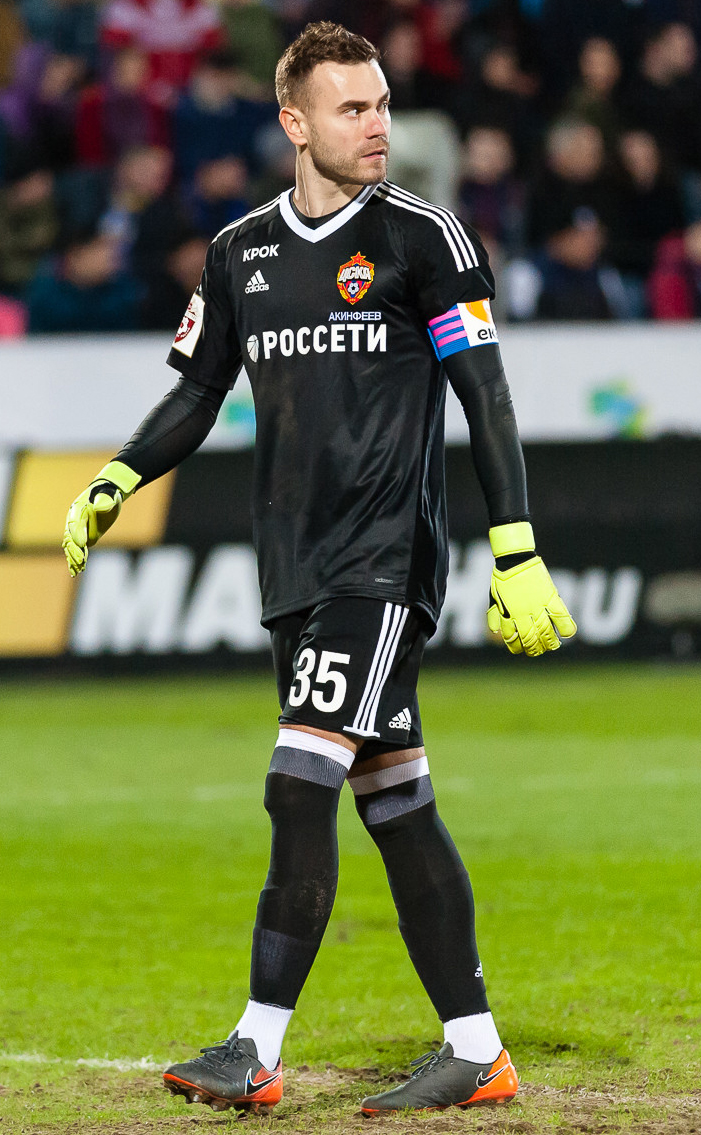
Akinfeev with CSKA Moscow in April 2018

Akinfeev made his professional debut for CSKA Moscow at the age of 16, saving a penalty kick and keeping a clean sheet in a 2–0 win over FC Krylia Sovetov Samara. He broke into the starting line-up at the age of 17 in 2003, winning the club's first Russian Premier League in the same season. In 2005, CSKA won a treble of the Russian Premier League Russian Cup and UEFA Cup. During this season, Akinfeev played in all 19 of CSKA's European matches, including the 2005 UEFA Cup Final, which the Army Men won 3–1 against Sporting CP at their opponents' Estádio José Alvalade. In 2006, he won a third Russian league title and second Russian Cup with CSKA and was awarded the Zvezda trophy, for the year's best football player from the former Soviet Union.

In the 2006–07 UEFA Champions League, Akinfeev went 362 minutes without conceding a goal until Ricardo Quaresma scored past him for FC Porto in his team's fifth group match. This began a record breaking run of 43 consecutive matches without keeping a clean sheet in the Champions League (including qualifying rounds). His Champions League run without a clean sheet finally ended 11 years later, when CSKA Moscow beat AEK Athens 2–0 away in the qualifying stages of the Champions League on 25 July 2017; prior to the match, Akinfeev's last clean sheet in the Champions League had come against Arsenal in November 2006, and the sequence became a record in the competition in October 2013 when he conceded two goals against FC Viktoria Plzen for a 17th consecutive 'non-clean sheet'.

In May 2007, Akinfeev sustained a knee injury which kept him out for the remainder of the 2007 Russian Premier League season. CSKA ended the season third in the league behind city rivals Spartak Moscow and champions Zenit St. Petersburg. Akinfeev returned to full fitness for the 2008 season, was appointed club captain, and started all 30 league matches. He also helped CSKA win the Russian Cup, saving a penalty in the final shootout against Amkar Perm. In 2009, he again started all 30 Russian Premier League matches and kept a clean sheet in the 1–0 Russian Cup Final defeat of league winners Rubin Kazan.

In May 2011, Akinfeev captained CSKA to a fifth Russian Cup of his career. In 2012–13, CSKA won their first Russian Premier League title in seven years, with Akinfeev named Russian Footballer of the Year. Akinfeev also saved Yuri Zhirkov's kick in CSKA's penalty shootout win over Anzhi Makhachkala in the 2013 Russian Cup Final.

On 1 February 2014, CSKA Moscow announced that Akinfeev had extended his contract CSKA until the summer of 2019. In 2013–14, Akinfeev won a fifth Russian Premier League title. On 14 May, he overtook Lev Yashin as the goalkeeper with the third-highest number of clean sheets in Russian football. On 14 November 2015, he broke this clean sheet record with his 233rd career shutout in the Russia national football team's 1–0 win over Portugal.

In August 2018, Akinfeev extended his CSKA contract to last until 2022. In December 2018, Akinfeev earned his 300th clean sheet, becoming the first Russian goalkeeper to do so.

On 14 August 2021, he played his 489th game in the Russian top tier, repeating the record previously set by Sergei Ignashevich. In his next game on 21 August, he set a new record with 490. On 20 May 2022, Akinfeev extended his contract with CSKA until the end of the 2023–24 season.

On 11 June 2023, Akinfeev saved two penalty kicks in the 2023 Russian Cup Final shootout to win the trophy for CSKA. On 24 May 2024, Akinfeev extended his contract with CSKA until the end of the 2025–26 season.

On 1 June 2025, Akinfeev saved a penalty kick in the 2025 Russian Cup final shootout to win the Russian Cup for the eighth time. On 2 June 2026, he extended his contract with the club until 2027.

== International career ==
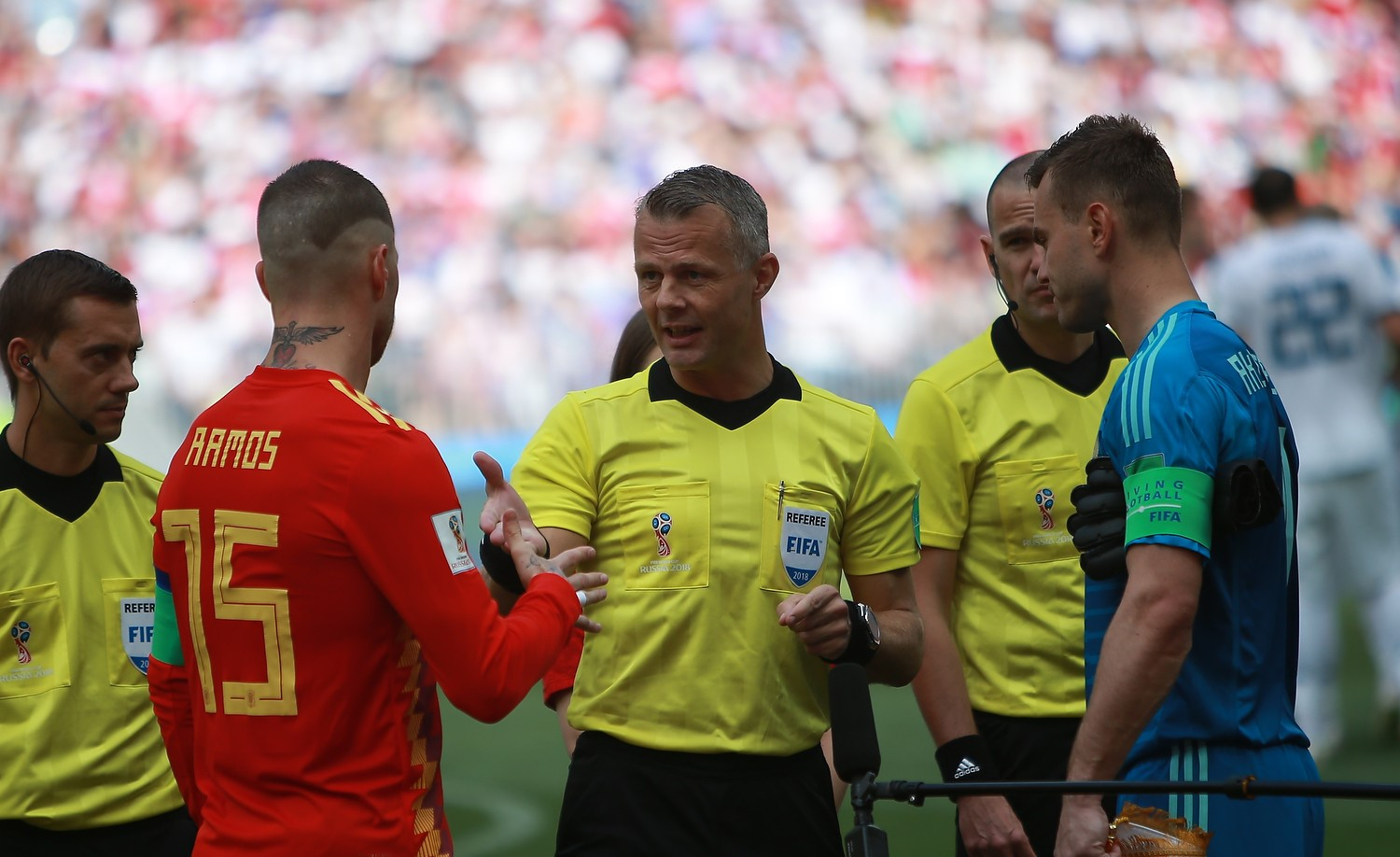
Akinfeev (far right) ahead of the 2018 FIFA World Cup match against Spain

Akinfeev made his debut for the Russian national team in a friendly match against Norway, which Russia lost 2–3, on 28 April 2004, aged 18 years and 20 days. He thus became the third youngest player to compete for Russia after Eduard Streltsov and Sergey Rodionov and the youngest international footballer ever in the history of the Russian Federation. He held the record for the youngest national team player for 18 years before being overtaken by Sergei Pinyayev in 2022. He was later included into the Russian UEFA Euro 2004 squad as the third choice goalkeeper behind Sergei Ovchinnikov and Vyacheslav Malafeev.

His major competitive debut was on 30 March 2005, in a 2006 FIFA World Cup qualifier against Estonia and he was later promoted to Russia's first-choice goalkeeper after a long-term injury to Malafeev. Akinfeev kept his first choice place under Yuri Semin and later Guus Hiddink. On 6 May 2007, Akinfeev suffered a knee injury in a 1–1 draw against FC Rostov which put him out of action for four months. As a result, he lost his first choice position to Vyacheslav Malafeev and later Vladimir Gabulov. He returned to the Russian national squad in early November but was deemed unfit for the UEFA Euro 2008 qualifier against Israel. Akinfeev later re-established his first choice place for Russia at UEFA Euro 2008, and played every match as the nation reached the semi-finals, losing 3–0 to eventual champions Spain.

He was confirmed for the finalized UEFA Euro 2012 squad on 25 May 2012, but Malafeev played all of Russia's matches and the nation was eliminated in the group stages. On 2 June 2014, Akinfeev was included in Russia's 2014 FIFA World Cup squad,

In Russia's first group match of the 2014 FIFA World Cup against South Korea, Akinfeev fumbled a long-range shot from Lee Keun-ho, dropping it over the line to give the Koreans the lead. Russia then went on to equalize, and the match finished 1–1. The final group stage match between Algeria and Russia on 26 June ended 1–1, advancing Algeria and eliminating Russia. A win for Russia would have seen them qualify, and they led the game 1–0 after six minutes. In the 60th minute of the game, a green laser was shone in Akinfeev's face while he was defending from an Algerian free kick, from which Islam Slimani scored to equalise. Both Akinfeev and Russian coach Fabio Capello blamed the laser for the decisive conceded goal.

On 27 March 2015, in a Euro 2016 Group G qualifier away to Montenegro, Akinfeev was struck in the head by a flare launched from the crowd, 20 seconds after kick-off. The game was called off for 35 minutes while he was treated, and resumed with his substitution for Yuri Lodygin. It was eventually abandoned after a brawl, while Akinfeev was taken to a Podgorica hospital with a neck injury and light burns. Akinfeev played his third UEFA European Championship for Russia at UEFA Euro 2016 as the national team finished bottom of Group B with only one point from three matches.

He was selected as captain for Russia's 2017 FIFA Confederations Cup campaign on home soil and kept a clean sheet as Russia defeated New Zealand 2–0 in the tournament's opening match; Russia were eliminated in the group stage of the tournament following defeats to Portugal and Mexico in their following two matches. On 21 June, in Russia's second group match, a 1–0 defeat to Portugal, Akinfeev won his 100th cap.

On 11 May 2018, he was included in Russia's extended 2018 FIFA World Cup squad. On 3 June, he was included in the 23-man squad. Akinfeev was later instrumental in the Russians knocking out Spain in the round of 16, being elected Man of the Match and saving two penalties in the shoot-out, ensuring a Russian victory. On 1 October, he announced his retirement from the national team.

== Style of play and reception ==
Regarded as a promising talent in his youth, Akinfeev's precocious performances as a youngster earned him comparisons with former esteemed Russian goalkeepers Lev Yashin and Rinat Dasayev. In 2005, UEFA's Pavel Gognidze praised Akinfeev for being a "cool-headed" goalkeeper in spite of his young age, commenting: "On top of confidence, Akinfeev can also boast cat-like reflexes and excellent aerial ability while he is quick off his line to deal with crosses and through balls. Handy with his kicks, what makes him so remarkable for his age is his positional sense – so well developed that the ball seems drawn towards him." CSKA's goalkeeping coach at the time, Vyacheslav Chanov, also added: "Igor is a real goalkeeper, it's in his character and attitude. Since the age of four, he has only dreamed of becoming a goalkeeper. He's very confident. I think he also tops all Russian goalkeepers in the length and precision of his goal kicks. With his right, he kicks 90 metres, with his left 80 metres." He has also been praised in the media for his leadership qualities.

A one-club man in Russian, European and world football, Akinfeev had played for more than a decade as part of the starting eleven in both the club and national side — alongside defenders Sergei Ignashevich and the Berezutski twins. According to the online sports media outlet Undici, 'Akinfeev remains one of the best goalkeepers in recent Russian history'.

== Career statistics ==
=== Club ===
As of match played 4 April 2026

Appearances and goals by club, season and competition
Club	Season	League			Russian Cup		Europe		Other		Total	
Club	Season	Division	Apps	Goals	Apps	Goals	Apps	Goals	Apps	Goals	Apps	Goals
CSKA Moscow	2003	Russian Premier League	13	0	2	0	1 (Note: Appearance(s) in UEFA Champions League)	0	2 (Note: Appearances in Russian Premier League Cup)	0	18	0
CSKA Moscow	2004	Russian Premier League	26	0	1	0	10	0	1 (Note: Appearance in Russian Super Cup)	0	38	0
CSKA Moscow	2005	Russian Premier League	29	0	7	0	15 (Note: Appearances in UEFA Cup)	0	1 (Note: Appearance in UEFA Super Cup)	0	52	0
CSKA Moscow	2006	Russian Premier League	28	0	7	0	8	0	0	0	44	0
CSKA Moscow	2007	Russian Premier League	10	0	2	0	5	0	1	0	18	0
CSKA Moscow	2008	Russian Premier League	30	0	2	0	6	0	0	0	38	0
CSKA Moscow	2009	Russian Premier League	30	0	4	0	10 (Note: Six appearances in UEFA Champions League, four appearances in UEFA Cup)	0	1	0	45	0
CSKA Moscow	2010	Russian Premier League	28	0	1	0	11 (Note: Four appearances in UEFA Champions League, seven appearances in UEFA Europa League)	0	1	0	41	0
CSKA Moscow	2011–12	Russian Premier League	28	0	4	0	4	0	1	0	37	0
CSKA Moscow	2012–13	Russian Premier League	29	0	2	0	2 (Note: Appearances in UEFA Europa League)	0	—		33	0
CSKA Moscow	2013–14	Russian Premier League	29	0	3	0	6	0	1	0	39	0
CSKA Moscow	2014–15	Russian Premier League	30	0	2	0	6	0	1	0	39	0
CSKA Moscow	2015–16	Russian Premier League	30	0	3	0	10	0	1	0	44	0
CSKA Moscow	2016–17	Russian Premier League	29	0	0	0	6	0	1	0	35	0
CSKA Moscow	2017–18	Russian Premier League	28	0	0	0	16	0	—		44	0
CSKA Moscow	2018–19	Russian Premier League	30	0	0	0	5	0	1	0	36	0
CSKA Moscow	2019–20	Russian Premier League	30	0	1	0	5	0	—		36	0
CSKA Moscow	2020–21	Russian Premier League	28	0	3	0	6	0	—		37	0
CSKA Moscow	2021–22	Russian Premier League	29	0	2	0	—		—		31	0
CSKA Moscow	2022–23	Russian Premier League	29	0	6	0	—		—		35	0
CSKA Moscow	2023–24	Russian Premier League	25	0	1	0	—		1	0	27	0
CSKA Moscow	2024–25	Russian Premier League	28	0	2	0	—		—		30	0
CSKA Moscow	2025–26	Russian Premier League	19	0	1	0	—		1	0	21	0
Career total			615	0	56	0	132	0	15	0	818	0

=== International ===
Appearances and goals by national team and year
National team	Year	Apps	Goals
Russia	2003	0	0
Russia	2004	1	0
Russia	2005	7	0
Russia	2006	7	0
Russia	2007	2	0
Russia	2008	11	0
Russia	2009	10	0
Russia	2010	7	0
Russia	2011	4	0
Russia	2012	7	0
Russia	2013	8	0
Russia	2014	12	0
Russia	2015	8	0
Russia	2016	10	0
Russia	2017	9	0
Russia	2018	8	0
Total		111	0

== Honours ==
CSKA Moscow

- Russian Premier League: 2003, 2005, 2006, 2012–13, 2013–14, 2015–16
- Russian Cup: 2004–05, 2005–06, 2007–08, 2008–09, 2010–11, 2012–13, 2022–23, 2024–25
- Russian Super Cup: 2004, 2006, 2007, 2009, 2013, 2014, 2018, 2025
- UEFA Cup: 2004–05

Russia

- UEFA European Championship bronze medalist: 2008

Individual

- 2012–13 Russian Premier League Player of the Year
- Footballer of the Year in Russia: 2012–13.
- Baltic and Commonwealth of Independent States Footballer of the Year ("Star") by Sport-Express (2006)
- The best young football player of Russian Premier League (2005)
- List of 33 best football player of the Russian Championship: # 1 (2005, 2006, 2008, 2009, 2010, 2012/13, 2013/14); # 2 (2011/2012); # 3 (2004).
- The best Russian goalkeeper according to Russian Football Union (2008, 2009, 2010)
- The best goalkeeper of the Russian Premier League: 2021–22, 2022–23
- Russian Premier League assist of the season: 2022–23
- The best young goalkeeper of Europe (2008)
- Maxim Rubin Goalkeeping Excellence Award (2008)
- Member of Lev Yashin Club
- Russian CSKA Prize "Golden Horseshoe": one golden horseshoe (2010) and four silver horseshoe (2005, 2006, 2008, 2009)
- Order of Friendship (2006)
- Lev Yashin Prize "Goalkeeper of the year" (2004, 2005, 2006, 2008, 2009, 2010)
- Russian Premier League Team of the Season: 2022–23
- Russian Premier League Player of the Month: March 2025

== Personal life ==
In April 2023, amidst the Russian invasion of Ukraine, Akinfeev was amongst a number of individuals in the field of sports to be placed under sanctions by the Ukrainian government, freezing his assets in Ukraine and implementing a 50-year ban on entering the country.

== See also ==
- List of men's footballers with 100 or more international caps
- List of one-club men in association football
