= Hulk (footballer) =

Brazilian footballer (born 1986)

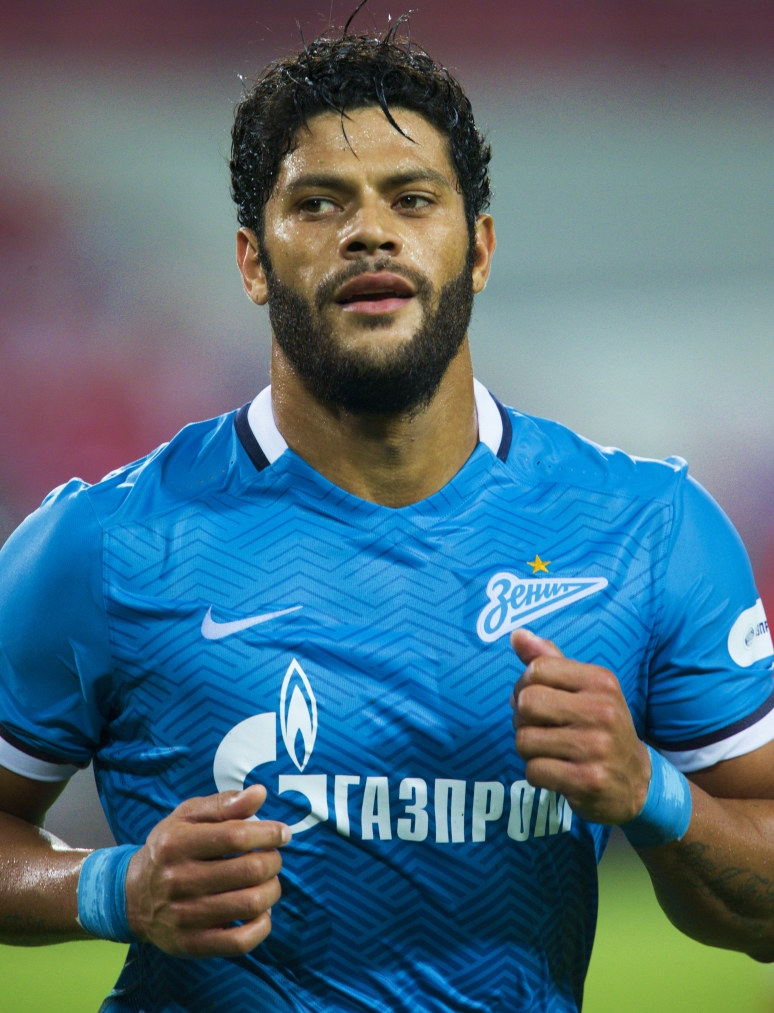
- Hulk playing for Zenit in 2015

Personal information
- Full name: Givanildo Vieira de Sousa
- Date of birth: 25 July 1986 (age 40)
- Place of birth: Campina Grande, Brazil
- Height: 1.80 m (5 ft 11 in)
- Position: Striker

Team information
- Current team: Fluminense
- Number: 7

Youth career
- 1998–2000: Serrano-PB
- 2000: Campinense
- 2001–2002: Vilanovense
- 2002: São Paulo
- 2003–2004: Vitória

Senior career*
Years	Team	Apps	(Gls)
2004–2006	Vitória	2	(0)
2005–2006	→ Kawasaki Frontale (loan)	9	(1)
2006–2008	Kawasaki Frontale	2	(0)
2006–2007	→ Consadole Sapporo (loan)	38	(25)
2006–2007	→ Tokyo Verdy (loan)	42	(37)
2007–2008	Tokyo Verdy	11	(7)
2008–2012	Porto	99	(54)
2012–2016	Zenit	97	(56)
2016–2020	Shanghai Port	100	(51)
2021–2026	Atlético Mineiro	219	(106)
2026–	Fluminense	16	(6)

International career
2009–2021	Brazil	49	(11)
2012	Brazil Olympic (O.P.)	6	(1)
Medal record
Representing Brazil
Men's football
FIFA Confederations Cup
Winner	2013 Brazil
Olympic Games
Silver medal – second place	2012 London	Team
- * Club domestic league appearances and goals as of 23:18, 19 November 2026 (UTC)

Givanildo Vieira de Sousa (born 25 July 1986), mononymously known as Hulk (Brazilian Portuguese: [ˈʁuwki]), is a Brazilian professional footballer who plays as a striker for Campeonato Brasileiro Série A club Fluminense.

After starting out professionally with Vitória and then playing three years in Japan, he played several seasons in Portugal with Porto, winning ten titles – including the 2010–11 UEFA Europa League and three national championships. He was crowned the league's top scorer once. In 2012, he joined Russian Premier League side Zenit for €60 million, winning all three domestic honours and being named the competition's best player and being top scorer, once each. He was transferred to Shanghai Port for an Asian record €58.6 million in 2016. In 2021, he returned to his homeland and joined Atlético Mineiro, winning the national league and becoming the club's seventh all-time top scorer in a five-year spell.

Hulk made his international debut in 2009, and played for Brazil at the 2012 Summer Olympics as one of the three permitted over-age players. He went on to represent the Brazilian team in their 2013 FIFA Confederations Cup victory and fourth-place finish at the 2014 FIFA World Cup.

He is described by FIFA's official website as "a direct powerhouse of a centre- or wide-forward who knows his way around the box". Strongly built for a footballer, he acquired his nickname from his father, who was a fan of The Incredible Hulk television series starring Lou Ferrigno.

== Club career ==
=== Early career ===
Born in Campina Grande, Paraíba, Hulk started playing professionally with Esporte Clube Vitória in Salvador, Bahia, where he signed his first professional contract with the club at age 16. While progressing through the Esporte Clube Vitória's youth system, Hulk played in a left winger, midfielder, forward and fullback. Hulk then went on loan to Japan to play for Kawasaki Frontale after catching the eye of a representative from Kawasaki Frontale. Despite having been purchased on 15 January 2006, Hulk was loaned to second division Consadole Sapporo, effective on 1 February, where he played all the 2006 season and scored 25 goals, one less than the top scorer.

In 2007, he was loaned again to a second division team, Tokyo Verdy, where he was even more effective, scoring 37 goals in 42 matches and being the top goal scorer of the season. He briefly returned to Kawasaki in 2008 and rejoined Verdy after only 18 matches.

=== Porto ===
After Hulk's stay in Japan, he moved to Portugal to join defending champions Porto, who purchased 50% of his playing rights for €5.5 million from Uruguayan side Rentistas, with the transfer fee being received by an unnamed investor.

When Moroccan teammate Tarik Sektioui suffered an injury, Hulk was given an opportunity to play forward and scored his first official domestic league goal for Porto in a 2–0 home win against C.F. Os Belenenses, later adding against F.C. Paços de Ferreira (same venue and result), both as a second-half substitute. As the season advanced, he became an undisputed starter, forming an attacking trio with Cristian Rodríguez and Lisandro López, with the trio often shifting positions. After some stellar performances in the season's UEFA Champions League, he was elected as one of the Top 10 Rising Stars by UEFA.com. In late August 2009, he extended his contract to June 2014, with a buy-out clause increased to €100 million.

In the 2009–10 season, Hulk established as an automatic first-choice. However, following a tunnel brawl during the league loss against S.L. Benfica (1–0) on 20 December 2009, he received a four-month ban (if the disciplinary hearing upheld the ban, he faced up to three years on the sidelines), only for the domestic competitions, as did his teammate Cristian Săpunaru. The ban was later reduced to four matches, and the player returned to league action on 28 March 2010 after missing 3 months and 18 matches, scoring in a 3–0 win at Belenenses. One week later, he also scored in a 4–1 home victory over C.S. Marítimo. With six less matches played than the previous season, he ended with five league goals.

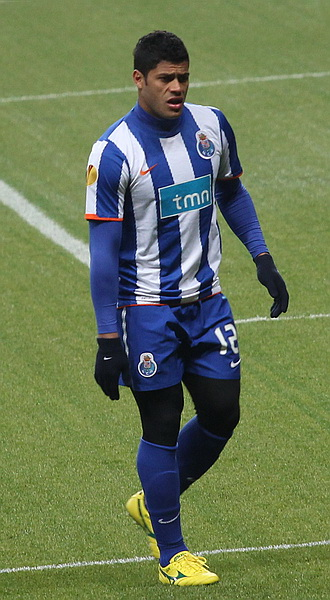
Hulk playing for Porto in 2010

Hulk started the 2010–11 season scoring 16 times in his first 16 official matches, including a hat-trick against K.R.C. Genk in the UEFA Europa League play-off stage, on 26 August 2010 (4–2 home win, 7–2 on aggregate). From September to January, he won the Portuguese Championship Player of the Month, making him the only player to have won the award six times. On 7 November 2010, he scored the last two goals as Porto trounced Benfica 5–0 at home, creating a ten-point difference between the two teams, with the northerners leading the league, and eventually winning it, with the player leading the goalscoring charts.

On 13 May 2011, Porto paid €13.5 million to Rentistas for another 40% of Hulk's playing rights, bringing their total stake to 85% (Porto sold back 5% after renewing his contract in 2009), with the player signing a new contract valid until 2016 and with a buy-out clause of €100 million. He finished the season with 36 goals in 53 official matches, with his team winning four major titles, including a league/cup double.

On 7 April 2012, Hulk scored the solitary goal as Porto defeated S.C. Braga away to go four points clear at the top of the Primeira Liga table. He scored six goals in the following three matches, including a brace in a 2–0 home defeat of Sporting CP, and finished the 2011–12 season with 16 league goals as his team won another national championship. In May 2012, he was voted the Player of the Month for April for a record sixth time, and he added 11 assists, a competition best.

On 17 February 2014, Hulk was ordered to pay a €45,000 fine for assaulting two stewards at the Estádio da Luz.

=== Zenit ===
On 3 September 2012, Hulk completed a transfer of €60 million, with Porto receiving €40 million, (Note: Based on Porto did not have obligation to pay for third parties ownership (15%), agent fee (€8M) and solidarity contribution (5%), total for €20 million) to Russian Premier League club Zenit, reuniting with former Porto teammate Bruno Alves. This transfer fee caused a lot of debate and a great stir since Mitrofanov, General director from Zenit denied publicly. Russian media R-Sport even claimed that Mitrofanov had shown the media the sales contract and the fee on the contract was €40 million and not €60 million. However, Porto also confirmed in its unaudited quarterly report in Q1 2012–13 that the club did not pay for third parties ownership (15%), agent fee nor solidarity contribution (5%), which all normally included in the transfer fee, as in the case of Radamel Falcao.

Hulk scored his first goal for his new club in only his second league match, against FC Krylia Sovetov Samara, finding the net with a trademark shot from outside the box in a 2–2 away draw.

In the second half of September, media speculation reported that teammates Igor Denisov and Aleksandr Kerzhakov were unsatisfied with Hulk's wage, and that they demanded renegotiation of their contracts. As a result, they were sent to the youth squad. Denisov replied in an interview with Sport Express stating that his stand-off with club management was over "the proper organisation of the team. And respect for the Russian players which Zenit has always relied upon". A few days after the feud, he scored and assisted in a 2–1 win against FC Baltika Kaliningrad for the fifth round of the Russian Cup. A few weeks later, he scored his first Champions League goal for Zenit and provided an assist in a 3–2 loss against A.C. Milan in the second matchday of group stage.

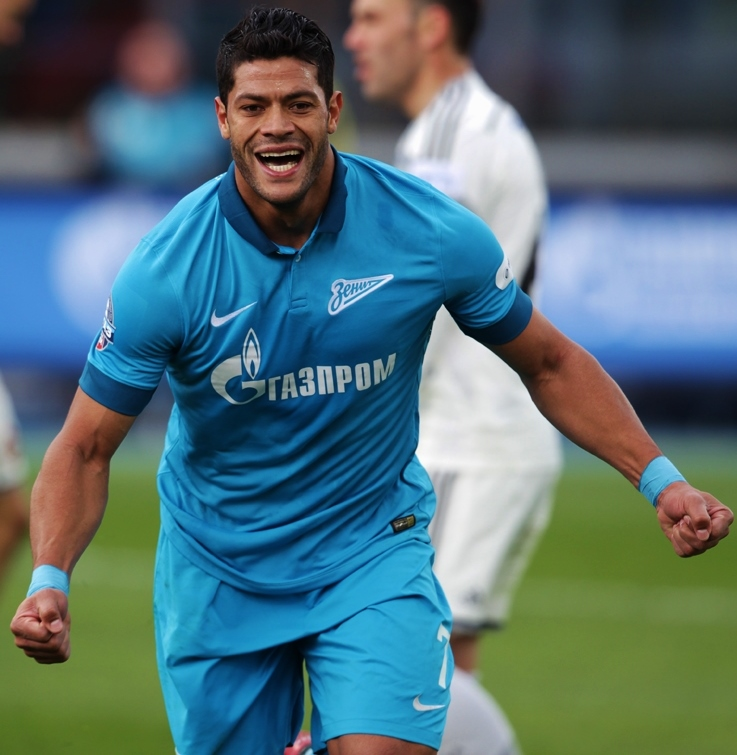
Hulk playing for Zenit in 2015

After falling out with head coach Luciano Spalletti, Hulk declared he was seeking to leave the club in January. However, FIFA regulations ban players from playing for more than two clubs in a season, forcing him to stay in Russia at least until June 2013. Eventually, he revealed he made amends with the club's management and that things have been resolved. In a 3–1 loss against the Ukrainian side of Shakhtar Donetsk, he suffered a head injury after falling under a challenge and connecting his head with a Shakhtar defender's studs in the second half. He was then taken to a local Dubai hospital. Following Zenit's third-place finish in the Champions League group stage, the club entered into the Europa League. He scored a goal in each leg of Zenit's knockout phase match to eliminate English side Liverpool from the Europa League in the round of 32 by away goals, despite losing 3–1 in the second leg. On 4 May 2013, he scored his first hat-trick of his Zenit career and assisted a goal, in a 4–0 win over league strugglers Alania Vladikavkaz.

On 16 February 2015, Hulk signed two-year contract extension with the club. On 17 May, his free kick in a 1–1 draw at FC Ufa gave Zenit the league title with two matches to spare.

Hulk was due to be an assistant at the draw for 2018 World Cup qualification in Saint Petersburg, but withdrew due to commitments with Zenit, being replaced by Alexey Smertin.

Hulk was named by UEFA as one of the top XI players of the 2015–16 UEFA Champions League group stage.

=== Shanghai SIPG ===
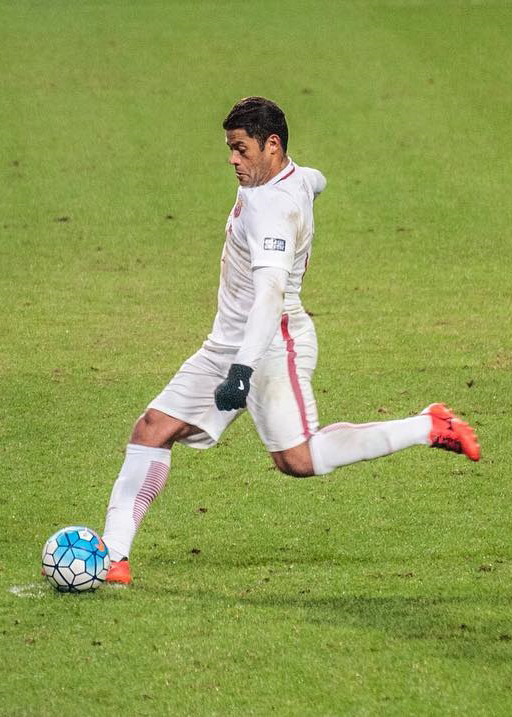
Hulk playing for Shanghai SIPG in 2017

On 30 June 2016, Hulk joined Chinese club Shanghai SIPG from Zenit for a reported £45 million, an Asian football record. He would earn £320,000 per week, accumulating to £16.6 million per year. On 10 July, Hulk forced Ryan McGowan's own goal nine minutes into his debut in a 5–0 win over Henan Jianye. However, just 12 minutes later, he was stretchered off the pitch with a muscle injury. On 9 September, Hulk scored his first two goals for Shanghai SIPG against Beijing Guoan after a two-month injury lay-off.

Hulk made a total of 145 appearances and scored a total of 77 goals across all competitions during his time in Shanghai.

=== Atlético Mineiro ===
==== 2021: Top scorer in both the Série A and Copa do Brasil ====
On 29 January 2021, Hulk returned to Brazil and joined Atlético Mineiro on a two-year contract. He made his debut on 7 March, assisting the fourth goal for Diego Tardelli in a 4–0 Campeonato Mineiro win over Uberlândia. On 19 March, he scored his first goal for the club, from a penalty kick, in a 3–0 win over Coimbra.

After a tough spell in April, with six games without scoring and being relegated to the bench, Hulk picked up his form in the Copa Libertadores against América de Cali and Cerro Porteño, scoring a brace in each game. On 22 May, Atlético were crowned the Campeonato Mineiro champions, and Hulk was voted by journalists into the team of the tournament.

On 17 July, Hulk scored both goals in a 2–1 turnaround win over Corinthians, in the Série A. In the next round, he again scored twice in a 3–0 win over Bahia. On 21 November, he became top scorer of the league after yet another brace in a 2–0 win over Juventude. On 2 December, when Atlético played for the league title and was 2–0 down against Bahia at the Fonte Nova arena, Hulk kick-started a comeback by scoring from a penalty; five minutes later, a brace from Keno snatched the three points that secured the 2021 Série A trophy to Galo. In the following match, a 4–3 win over Red Bull Bragantino at the Mineirão, Hulk scored his 19th goal in 35 appearances, ending the league season as top scorer.

Hulk appeared in all ten matches of Atlético's Copa do Brasil-winning campaign, scoring once in eight of them, including both legs of the final against Athletico Paranaense. He became only the second player to be top scorer in both the Série A and Copa do Brasil in a same season, repeating Gabriel Barbosa's feat in 2018.

Hulk was the country's top scorer in 2021, with a total of 36 goals in 68 appearances, while also providing 13 assists. His central role in Atlético's domestic treble-winning season earned him the Bola de Ouro, Craque do Brasileirão and Copa do Brasil Golden Ball awards. He was also included in CONMEBOL's Libertadores Team of the Tournament and El País' South American Team of the Year.

==== 2022–23: Back-to-back Campeonato Mineiro titles ====
In the 2022 Supercopa do Brasil against Flamengo on 20 February 2022, Hulk scored a second-half equalizer to tie the match at 2–2 and then converted two penalties in an eventual 8–7 shootout victory. At the end of the match, he received the award for best player of the competition. On 16 March, Hulk renewed his contract until the end of 2024, with the option to extend until 2025. The following week, on 23 March, he scored both goals in the 2–0 victory over Caldense in the first leg of the 2022 Campeonato Mineiro semifinals, becoming the top scorer at the Mineirão with 32 goals, overtaking Giorgian de Arrascaeta. In the final on 2 April, Hulk scored twice in a 3–1 win over Cruzeiro, thus lifting his fourth trophy for Atlético in a four-month period. He finished the tournament as its top scorer, with ten goals in eight appearances.

In the first matchday of the Série A, Hulk scored both goals in a 2–0 victory against Internacional. On 19 May, he scored a brace in a 3–1 victory over Independiente del Valle, which secured his side's spot in the round of 16 of the Copa Libertadores. The following week, on 28 May, he made his 88th appearance for Atlético in a Copa Libertadores loss to Deportes Tolima, drawing level with Ronaldinho; coincidentally, both made 59 goal contributions after 88 matches for Atlético. Hulk made his 100th appearance for Atlético in the round of 16 of the Copa do Brasil against Flamengo at the Maracanã on 14 July, which ended in elimination. On 3 August, Hulk scored against Palmeiras in the quarter-finals of the Copa Libertadores to become the club's top scorer in the competition with 12 goals, surpassing the previous record set by Jô.

In March and April 2023, the 36-year-old Hulk played a crucial role in the Atlético Mineiro team that won the 2023 Campeonato Mineiro, scoring his side's only goal in the semifinal tie against Athletic, and then scored in both legs of the final against América, including a last-minute winner in the first leg and a brace in the second, finishing the tournament as its top scorer with 11 goals. On 6 August, the 37-year-old Hulk scored a long-range free kick in a 2–0 league win over São Paulo, which ended a 10-match winless streak. On 12 November, Hulk scored his 400th career goal in official matches in a Série A match against Goiás, doing so in 766 matches.

==== 2024: Copa Libertadores runner-up ====
On 9 March, Hulk scored his 100th goal for Atlético Mineiro in a 2–0 win over América in the semifinals of the 2024 Campeonato Mineiro. He then scored in both legs of the final against Cruzeiro, finishing the tournament as its top scorer (7 goals) for the fourth time in a row, an unprecedented feat, overtaking the three-peats of Ninão (1928–30) and Tostão (1966–68). This meant that he had now played 10 matches over the course of six finals for Atlético Mineiro, scoring ten goals to help his side to six victories and four draws. In November, however, Atlético lost both legs in the final of the 2024 Copa do Brasil to Flamengo and then lost the 2024 Copa Libertadores final to Botafogo 1–3, despite assising his side's only goal in that match. After the match, Hulk was in tears as he apologized to the fans for the loss.

A few months earlier, on 21 July, Hulk, just four days shy of his 38th birthday, scored his 50th Série A goal with a brace in a 2–0 win over Vasco da Gama; this was also his 20th brace with the club. With 19 goals scored in the 2024 season, Hulk reached the mark of 114 goals for Atlético, thus surpassing Diego Tardelli to become the club's top scorer in the 21st century.

==== 2026: Farewell ====
On 2 May 2026, Hulk mutually terminated his contract with Atlético Mineiro, ending his five year stay with the club. His final match for Atlético ended up being a Copa do Brasil fifth round first leg match against Ceará on 23 April, in which he came off the bench in the 61st minute for Mateo Cassierra.

=== Fluminense ===
On 5 May 2026, Hulk joined Fluminense on a free transfer and a contract running until December 2027.

== International career ==
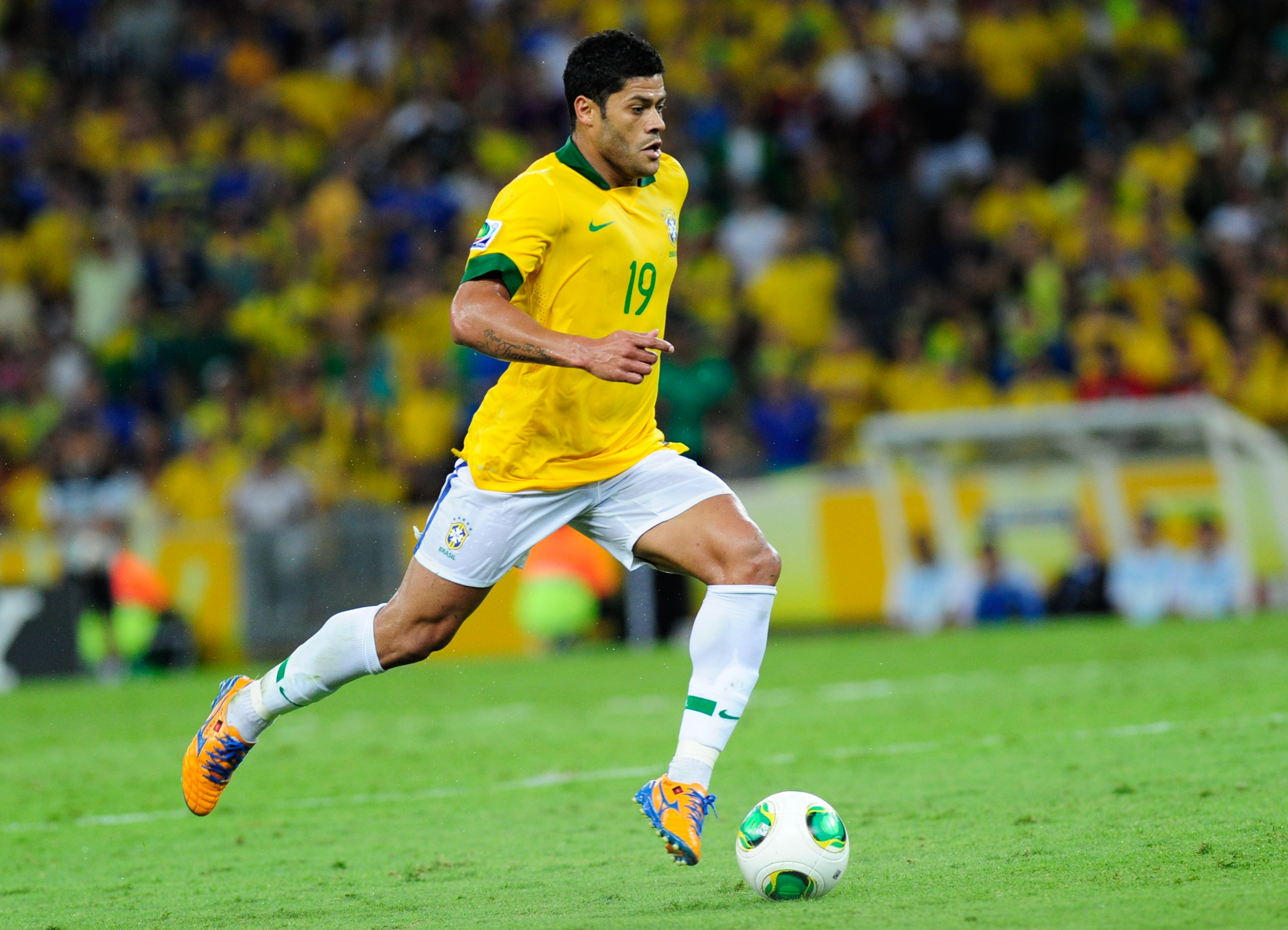
Hulk playing for Brazil at the 2013 Confederations Cup

Hulk made his debut for Brazil on 14 November 2009 in a friendly match against England in Doha, as the Seleção managed a 1–0 victory. On 26 May 2012, he scored his first three international goals in a 3–1 win against Denmark at the Imtech Arena, Hamburg.

On 9 June 2012, in a friendly with Argentina, Hulk scored in a 3–4 loss. In July, he was named as one of three overaged players for Mano Menezes' Brazilian squad for the 2012 Summer Olympics in London, and he appeared in all but one of the matches during the tournament, netting in the 1–2 final loss against Mexico.

In June 2013, Hulk represented Brazil at the 2013 FIFA Confederations Cup. He played in every match as the team's starting right-winger, including the final, where Brazil defeated world champions Spain to win its fourth Confederations Cup title.

At the 2014 World Cup, in the round of 16 match against Chile in Belo Horizonte, Hulk had a goal disallowed for a handball. In the shootout, he had his penalty saved by Claudio Bravo, although Brazil nonetheless advanced.

Hulk was called up for the Copa América Centenario in 2016, making one appearance as a substitute in Brazil's group stage campaign.

In August 2021, Hulk received his first call up to the national team in five years for 2022 World Cup qualifiers; he appeared as a substitute in a 2–0 win over Peru on 9 September.

== Style of play ==
A predominantly left-footed forward who could operate either centrally or from wide areas, Hulk combined a powerful physique with pace, ball-carrying ability and direct running. During his early career at Porto, The Guardian described him as fast and brave, with "a hammer of a left foot", while David Pleat noted his ability to shield the ball, turn towards defenders and move inside onto his stronger left foot. FIFA later highlighted his powerful shooting, pace and technical ability, describing him as a centre-forward or winger who could be difficult for defenders to stop. His long-range shooting and set-piece power became among his most recognisable attributes; UEFA noted a 35-metre free kick for Porto against Shakhtar Donetsk in 2011 as a powerful, swerving effort, and in 2023 ge reported that one of his free-kick goals for Atlético Mineiro was measured at 119 km/h.

== Personal life ==
Born and raised in Campina Grande, Paraíba, Hulk was the fourth of seven children and the fourth son born to his parents. He began to play football at three years old, thanks to his father.

Hulk was previously married to Iran Angelo de Souza, whom he met in Japan. The pair married in 2007 before separating in July 2019. They have two sons, Ian and Tiago, and a daughter, Alice. After splitting from Iran, Hulk began dating her niece, Camila Angelo in October 2019.

It was reported in March 2020 that Hulk had married Camila, in part due to her needing a visa to stay in China with Hulk. In April 2022 Camila gave birth to their first baby together, daughter Zaya. This means that she is Hulk's fourth child.

== Career statistics ==
=== Club ===
As of match played 19 November 2026

Appearances and goals by club, season and competition
Club	Season	League			National cup (Note: Includes Emperor's Cup, Taça de Portugal, Russian Cup, Chinese FA Cup, Copa do Brasil)		League cup (Note: Includes J.League Cup, Taça da Liga)		Continental		State league (Note: Includes Campeonato Mineiro)		Other		Total	
Club	Season	Division	Apps	Goals	Apps	Goals	Apps	Goals	Apps	Goals	Apps	Goals	Apps	Goals	Apps	Goals
Vitória	2004	Série A	2	0	—		—		—		—		—		2	0
Kawasaki Frontale (loan)	2005	J1 League	9	1	2	2	1	0	—		—		—		12	3
Consadole Sapporo (loan)	2006	J2 League	38	25	3	1	—		—		—		—		41	26
Tokyo Verdy (loan)	2007	J2 League	42	37	0	0	—		—		—		—		42	37
Kawasaki Frontale	2008	J1 League	2	0	0	0	0	0	—		—		—		2	0
Tokyo Verdy	2008	J1 League	11	7	0	0	3	1	—		—		—		14	8
Porto	2008–09	Primeira Liga	25	8	7	1	1	0	10 (Note: Appearances in UEFA Champions League)	0	—		1 (Note: Appearance in Supertaça Cândido de Oliveira)	0	44	9
Porto	2009–10	Primeira Liga	19	5	3	2	0	0	8	3	—		1	0	31	10
Porto	2010–11	Primeira Liga	26	23	7	4	3	1	16 (Note: Appearances in UEFA Europa League)	7	—		1	0	53	35
Porto	2011–12	Primeira Liga	26	16	1	0	2	1	8 (Note: Six appearances and four goals in UEFA Champions League, two appearances in UEFA Europa League)	4	—		2 (Note: One appearance in Supertaça Cândido de Oliveira, one appearance in UEFA Super Cup)	0	39	21
Porto	2012–13	Primeira Liga	3	2	—		—		—		—		0	0	3	2
Porto	Total		99	54	18	7	6	2	42	14	—		5	0	170	77
Zenit	2012–13	Russian Premier League	18	7	3	1	—		9 (Note: Five appearances and two goals in UEFA Champions League, four appearances and one goal in UEFA Europa League)	3	—		—		30	11
Zenit	2013–14	Russian Premier League	24	17	0	0	—		10	5	—		0	0	34	22
Zenit	2014–15	Russian Premier League	28	15	2	0	—		15 (Note: Ten appearances and three goals in UEFA Champions League, five appearances and three goals in UEFA Europa League)	6	—		—		45	21
Zenit	2015–16	Russian Premier League	27	17	4	2	—		7	4	—		1 (Note: Appearance in Russian Super Cup)	0	39	23
Zenit	Total		97	56	9	3	—		41	18	—		1	0	148	77
Shanghai SIPG	2016	Chinese Super League	7	5	0	0	—		1 (Note: Appearance(s) in AFC Champions League)	0	—		—		8	5
Shanghai SIPG	2017	Chinese Super League	27	17	6	4	—		11	9	—		—		44	30
Shanghai SIPG	2018	Chinese Super League	25	13	2	1	—		8	3	—		—		35	17
Shanghai SIPG	2019	Chinese Super League	25	10	3	1	—		8	6	—		1 (Note: Appearance in Chinese FA Super Cup)	0	37	17
Shanghai SIPG	2020	Chinese Super League	16	6	1	0	—		4	2	—		—		21	8
Shanghai SIPG	Total		100	51	12	6	—		32	20	—		1	0	145	77
Atlético Mineiro	2021	Série A	35	19	10	8	—		12 (Note: Appearances in Copa Libertadores)	7	11	2	—		68	36
Atlético Mineiro	2022	Série A	25	12	2	1	—		10	5	8	10	1 (Note: Appearance in Supercopa do Brasil)	1	46	29
Atlético Mineiro	2023	Série A	34	15	4	1	—		10	3	11	11	—		59	30
Atlético Mineiro	2024	Série A	24	10	8	1	—		11	1	10	7	—		53	19
Atlético Mineiro	2025	Série A	33	8	7	2	—		13 (Note: Appearance(s) in Copa Sudamericana)	4	8	7	—		61	21
Atlético Mineiro	2026	Série A	12	1	1	0	—		1	0	8	4	—		22	5
Atlético Mineiro	Total		163	65	32	13	—		57	20	56	41	1	1	309	140
Fluminense	2026	Série A	16	6	2	0	—		6	1	—		—		24	7
Career total			579	302	78	32	10	3	178	73	56	41	8	1	909	452

=== International ===
Appearances and goals by national team and year
National team	Year	Apps	Goals
Brazil	2009	2	0
Brazil	2010	0	0
Brazil	2011	6	0
Brazil	2012	10	6
Brazil	2013	14	2
Brazil	2014	9	1
Brazil	2015	4	2
Brazil	2016	3	0
Brazil	2017	0	0
Brazil	2018	0	0
Brazil	2019	0	0
Brazil	2020	0	0
Brazil	2021	1	0
Total		49	11

Scores and results list Brazil's goal tally first, score column indicates score after each Hulk goal.

List of international goals scored by Hulk
No.	Date	Venue	Opponent	Score	Result	Competition
1	26 May 2012	Volksparkstadion, Altona, Hamburg, Germany	Denmark	1–0	3–1	Friendly
2	26 May 2012	Volksparkstadion, Altona, Hamburg, Germany	Denmark	3–0	3–1	Friendly
3	9 June 2012	MetLife Stadium, East Rutherford, United States	Argentina	3–2	3–4	Friendly
4	7 September 2012	Estádio do Morumbi, São Paulo, Brazil	South Africa	1–0	1–0	Friendly
5	10 September 2012	Estádio do Arruda, Recife, Brazil	China	4–0	8–0	Friendly
6	11 October 2012	Swedbank Stadion, Malmö, Sweden	Iraq	4–0	6–0	Friendly
7	16 November 2013	Sun Life Stadium, Miami, United States	Honduras	5–0	5–0	Friendly
8	19 November 2013	Rogers Centre, Toronto, Canada	Chile	1–0	2–1	Friendly
9	3 June 2014	Estádio Serra Dourada, Goiânia, Brazil	Panama	3–0	4–0	Friendly
10	5 September 2015	Red Bull Arena, Harrison, United States	Costa Rica	1–0	1–0	Friendly
11	8 September 2015	Gillette Stadium, Foxborough, United States	United States	1–0	4–1	Friendly

Goals in the Summer Olympics

No.	Date	Venue	Opponent	Score	Result	Competition
1	11 August 2012	Wembley Stadium, London, England	Mexico	1–2	1–2	2012 Summer Olympics

== Honours ==
Porto

- Primeira Liga: 2008–09, 2010–11, 2011–12, 2012–13
- Taça de Portugal: 2008–09, 2009–10, 2010–11
- Supertaça Cândido de Oliveira: 2009, 2010, 2011
- UEFA Europa League: 2010–11
- UEFA Super Cup runner-up: 2011

Zenit Saint Petersburg

- Russian Premier League: 2014–15
- Russian Cup: 2015–16
- Russian Super Cup: 2015

Shanghai SIPG

- Chinese Super League: 2018
- Chinese FA Super Cup: 2019
- Chinese FA Cup runner-up: 2017

Atlético Mineiro

- Campeonato Brasileiro Série A: 2021
- Copa do Brasil: 2021; runner-up: 2024
- Campeonato Mineiro: 2021, 2022, 2023, 2024, 2025; runner-up: 2026
- Supercopa do Brasil: 2022
- Copa Libertadores runner-up: 2024
- Copa Sudamericana runner-up: 2025

Brazil Olympic

- Summer Olympics silver medal: 2012

Brazil

- FIFA Confederations Cup: 2013

Individual

- J2 League top scorer: 2007
- LPFP Primeira Liga Breakthrough Player of the Year: 2008–09
- LPFP Primeira Liga Player of the Year: 2010–11, 2011–12
- Primeira Liga top scorer: 2010–11
- SJPF Player of the Month: February 2009, September 2010, October 2010, December 2010, January 2011, April 2012
- Russian Premier League top scorer: 2014–15
- Russian Premier League top assist provider: 2015–16
- Russian Premier League Forward of the Season: 2014–15
- Russian Premier League Right Winger of the Season: 2012–13, 2013–14, 2015–16
- Russian Premier League Player of the Month: September 2013
- Footballer of the Year in Russia (Sport-Express): 2014–15
- Footballer of the Year in Russia (Futbol): 2015
- Russian Cup top assist provider: 2012–13, 2015–16
- UEFA Champions League Team of the Group Stage: 2015
- Chinese Super League Team of the Year: 2017, 2018
- Campeonato Mineiro Team of the Year: 2021, 2022, 2023, 2024, 2025
- South American Team of the Year: 2021
- IFFHS Men's CONMEBOL Team: 2021 (substitute)
- Best Player in Brazil (Troféu Mesa Redonda): 2021
- Best Right Winger in Brazil (Troféu Mesa Redonda): 2021
- Top scorer in Brazilian football (Prêmio Arthur Friedenreich): 2021
- Campeonato Brasileiro Série A Player of the Year: 2021
- Campeonato Brasileiro Série A Team of the Year: 2021, 2023
- Campeonato Brasileiro Série A top scorer: 2021
- Campeonato Brasileiro Série A top assist provider: 2023
- Bola de Ouro: 2021
- Bola de Prata: 2021
- Copa do Brasil Best Player: 2021
- Copa do Brasil top scorer: 2021
- Campeonato Mineiro top scorer: 2022, 2023, 2024, 2025
- Copa Libertadores Team of the Tournament: 2021
