= Footballer of the Year in Russia (Sport-Express) =

Russian football annual award

Footballer of the Year in Russia is an annual award given by Sport-Express daily to the Russian Premier League player of the season. The title is awarded according to the results of a poll conducted by the newspaper. 11 players of each Premier League club are polled.

Brazilian Daniel Carvalho became the first foreign player to win the award in 2005.

== List of winners ==
Year	Winner	Club
1991	(Russia) Igor Korneev	CSKA Moscow
1992	(Russia) Igor Ledyakhov	Spartak Moscow
1993	(Russia) Viktor Onopko	Spartak Moscow
1994	(Russia) Igor Simutenkov	Dynamo Moscow
1995	(Russia) Ilya Tsymbalar	Spartak Moscow
1996	(Russia) Andrey Tikhonov	Spartak Moscow
1997	(Russia) Dmitri Alenichev	Spartak Moscow
1998	(Russia) Yegor Titov	Spartak Moscow
1999	(Russia) Alexei Smertin	Lokomotiv Moscow
2000	(Russia) Yegor Titov	Spartak Moscow
2001	(Russia) Ruslan Nigmatullin	Lokomotiv Moscow
2002	(Russia) Dmitri Loskov	Lokomotiv Moscow
2003	(Russia) Dmitri Loskov	Lokomotiv Moscow
2004	(Russia) Dmitri Sychev	Lokomotiv Moscow
2005	(Brazil) Daniel Carvalho	CSKA Moscow
2006	(Russia) Andrei Arshavin	Zenit Saint Petersburg
2007	(Russia) Konstantin Zyryanov	Zenit Saint Petersburg
2008	(Brazil) Vágner Love	CSKA Moscow
2009	(Argentina) Alejandro Domínguez	Rubin Kazan
2010	(Portugal) Danny	Zenit Saint Petersburg
2011	(Ivory Coast) Seydou Doumbia	CSKA Moscow
2012–13	(Russia) Igor Akinfeev	CSKA Moscow
2013–14	No voting	
2014–15	(Brazil) Hulk	Zenit Saint Petersburg
2015–16	(Russia) Fyodor Smolov	Krasnodar
2016–17	(Russia) Fyodor Smolov	Krasnodar
2017–18	(Russia) Fyodor Smolov	Krasnodar
2018–19	(Russia) Artem Dzyuba	Zenit Saint Petersburg
2019–20	(Russia) Artem Dzyuba	Zenit Saint Petersburg
2020–21	(Iran) Sardar Azmoun	Zenit Saint Petersburg
2021–22	(Brazil) Claudinho	Zenit Saint Petersburg
2022–23	(Brazil) Malcom	Zenit Saint Petersburg
2023–24	(Russia) Konstantin Tyukavin	Dynamo Moscow
2024–25	(Colombia) Jhon Córdoba	Krasnodar
2025–26	(Colombia) Jhon Córdoba	Krasnodar

== See also ==
- Footballer of the Year in Russia (Futbol), Futbol weekly magazine version
- Soviet Footballer of the Year
