= Footballer of the Year in Russia (Futbol) =

Annual award given by Futbol weekly

Footballer of the Year in Ruswas an annual award given by Futbol weekly to the Russian Premier League player of the season. The title was awarded according to the results of a poll conducted by the newspaper. The award started in 1964 as Soviet Footballer of the Year until changing its name for the 1992 season. The last title awarded in 2021.

== List of winners ==
Year	Winner	Club	Ref
1992	(Russia) Viktor Onopko	Spartak Moscow	
1993	(Russia) Viktor Onopko	Spartak Moscow	
1994	(Russia) Igor Simutenkov	Dynamo Moscow	
1995	(Russia) Ilya Tsymbalar	Spartak Moscow	
1996	(Russia) Andrey Tikhonov	Spartak Moscow	
1997	(Russia) Dmitri Alenichev	Spartak Moscow	
1998	(Russia) Yegor Titov	Spartak Moscow	
1999	(Russia) Alexei Smertin	Lokomotiv Moscow	
2000	(Russia) Yegor Titov	Spartak Moscow	
2001	(Russia) Ruslan Nigmatullin	Lokomotiv Moscow	
2002	(Russia) Dmitri Loskov	Lokomotiv Moscow	
2003	(Russia) Dmitri Loskov	Lokomotiv Moscow	
2004	(Russia) Dmitri Sychev	Lokomotiv Moscow	
2005	(Brazil) Daniel Carvalho	CSKA Moscow	
2006	(Russia) Andrei Arshavin	Zenit Saint Petersburg	
2007	(Russia) Konstantin Zyryanov	Zenit Saint Petersburg	
2008	(Russia) Yuri Zhirkov	CSKA Moscow	
2009	(Argentina) Alejandro Dominguez	Rubin Kazan	
2010	(Portugal) Danny	Zenit Saint Petersburg	
2011	(Ivory Coast) Seydou Doumbia	CSKA Moscow	
2012	(Russia) Roman Shirokov	Zenit Saint Petersburg	
2013	(Russia) Roman Shirokov	Zenit Saint Petersburg	
2014	(Ivory Coast) Seydou Doumbia	CSKA Moscow	
2015	(Brazil) Hulk	Zenit Saint Petersburg	
2016	(Russia) Fyodor Smolov	Krasnodar	
2017	(Netherlands) Quincy Promes	Spartak Moscow	
2018	(Russia) Artem Dzyuba	Zenit Saint Petersburg	
2021	(Iran) Sardar Azmoum	Zenit Saint Petersburg	

== See also ==
- Soviet Footballer of the Year
- Footballer of the Year in Russia (Sport-Express), Sport-Express daily newspaper version
