= Milan Jović =

Serbian footballer

Personal information
- Full name: Milan Jović
- Date of birth: 16 October 1975 (age 51)
- Place of birth: Valjevo, SR Serbia, SFR Yugoslavia
- Height: 1.85 m (6 ft 1 in)
- Position: Midfielder

Senior career*
Years	Team	Apps	(Gls)
1994–1996	Partizan	10	(0)
1996–1997	Budućnost Valjevo	24	(7)
1997–1999	Sartid Smederevo	38	(6)
1999	Vojvodina	8	(0)
2000	Spartak Moscow	10	(0)
2000–2001	Chernomorets Novorossiysk	19	(0)
2001	Rostselmash	6	(1)
2002–2003	Saturn Ramenskoye	37	(1)
Total		152	(15)
- * Club domestic league appearances and goals

Milan Jović (Serbian Cyrillic: Милан Јовић; born 16 October 1975) is a Serbian former professional footballer who played as a midfielder.

== Career ==
Jović made his senior debut with Partizan, making 10 league appearances in the 1994–95 season. He also appeared as a starter in the return leg of the 1995–96 FR Yugoslavia Cup final with Red Star, which would be his only appearance for the club that season. After leaving Partizan, Jović spent time at Budućnost Valjevo and Sartid Smederevo, before joining Vojvodina in 1999.

In the 2000 winter transfer window, Jović moved abroad and signed with Russian club Spartak Moscow. He went on to play for Chernomorets Novorossiysk, Rostselmash, and lastly Saturn Ramenskoye.
