= List of footballers with 100 or more caps =

List of footballers with 100 or more caps may refer to:

- List of men's footballers with 100 or more international caps
- List of women's footballers with 100 or more international caps
