= Nikolai Kozin =

Russian footballer

Personal information
- Full name: Nikolai Ivanovich Kozin
- Date of birth: 27 December 1955 (age 70)
- Place of birth: Kuban, Russian SFSR
- Position: Defender

Youth career
- FC Lokomotiv Gorky

Senior career*
| Years | Team | Apps | (Gls) |
| 1976–1979 | FC Volga Gorky | 142 | (3) |
| 1980 | FC Terek Grozny | | |
| 1981–1982 | FC Volga Gorky | 53 | (5) |
| 1982 | FC Kuban Krasnodar | 0 | (0) |
| 1983 | FC Volga Gorky | 24 | (1) |
| 1985–1986 | FC Khimik Dzerzhinsk | 56 | (0) |
| 1987 | FC Lokomotiv Gorky | 12 | (1) |
| 1989 | FC Lokomotiv Gorky | 0 | (0) |
| 1996 | FC Neftekhimik Kstovo | | |
| 1997 | FC Kvarts Bor | | |

Managerial career
- 1988–1989: FC Lokomotiv Gorky (assistant)
- 1999–2000: FC Lokomotiv Nizhny Novgorod (director)
- 2000: FC Lokomotiv Nizhny Novgorod
- 2000–2001: FC Lokomotiv Nizhny Novgorod (director)
- 2001: FC Lokomotiv Nizhny Novgorod
- 2002: FC Volgar-Gazprom Astrakhan (director)
- 2003: FC Volgar-Gazprom Astrakhan
- 2004: FC Lukoil Chelyabinsk (director)
- * Club domestic league appearances and goals

Nikolai Ivanovich Kozin (Russian: Николай Иванович Козин; born 27 December 1955) is a Russian football coach and a former player.
