= Mihai Drăguș =

Romanian footballer

Personal information
- Date of birth: 13 March 1973 (age 53)
- Place of birth: Bucharest, Romania
- Height: 1.85 m (6 ft 1 in)
- Position: Forward

Senior career*
Years	Team	Apps	(Gls)
1993–1995	Gloria Buzău	?	(?)
1995–1996	Dinamo București	?	(?)
1996–1997	Argeș Pitești	20	(3)
1998	Suwon Samsung Bluewings	21	(6)
1998–1999	Argeș Pitești	9	(1)
1999–2000	Torpedo Moscow	22	(1)
1999–2000	Torpedo-d Moscow	3	(1)
2000	Lokomotiv Nizhny Novgorod	6	(2)
Total		81	(14)
- * Club domestic league appearances and goals

Mihai Drăguş (born 13 March 1973 in Bucharest) is a retired Romanian football player. His son Denis is also a footballer.

== Honours ==
Suwon Samsung Bluewings

- K League: 1998
