= Sergei Gurchenkov =

Russian footballer and coach

Personal information
- Full name: Sergei Sergeyevich Gurchenkov
- Date of birth: 1 May 1983 (age 43)
- Place of birth: Moscow, Russian SFSR
- Height: 1.83 m (6 ft 0 in)
- Position: Midfielder

Youth career
- FC Spartak Moscow

Senior career*
Years	Team	Apps	(Gls)
1999–2001	FC Spartak Moscow	1	(0)
1999–2000	→ FC Spartak-d Moscow	9	(1)
2002–2003	FC Saturn-RenTV Ramenskoye	0	(0)
2004–2005	FC Saturn Yegoryevsk	42	(4)
2006	FC Olimp Zheleznodorozhny		
2006	FC Znamya Truda Orekhovo-Zuyevo (amateur)		
2007	FC Saturn Yegoryevsk	21	(1)

Managerial career
- 2008–2014: FC Spartak Moscow (academy)
- * Club domestic league appearances and goals

Sergei Sergeyevich Gurchenkov (Russian: Серге́й Серге́евич Гурченков; born 1 May 1983) is a Russian professional football coach and a former player.

== Club career ==
He made his professional debut in the Russian Second Division in 1999 for FC Spartak-d Moscow.

== Honours ==
- Russian Premier League champion: 2000.
