= Eduard Mor =

Russian footballer

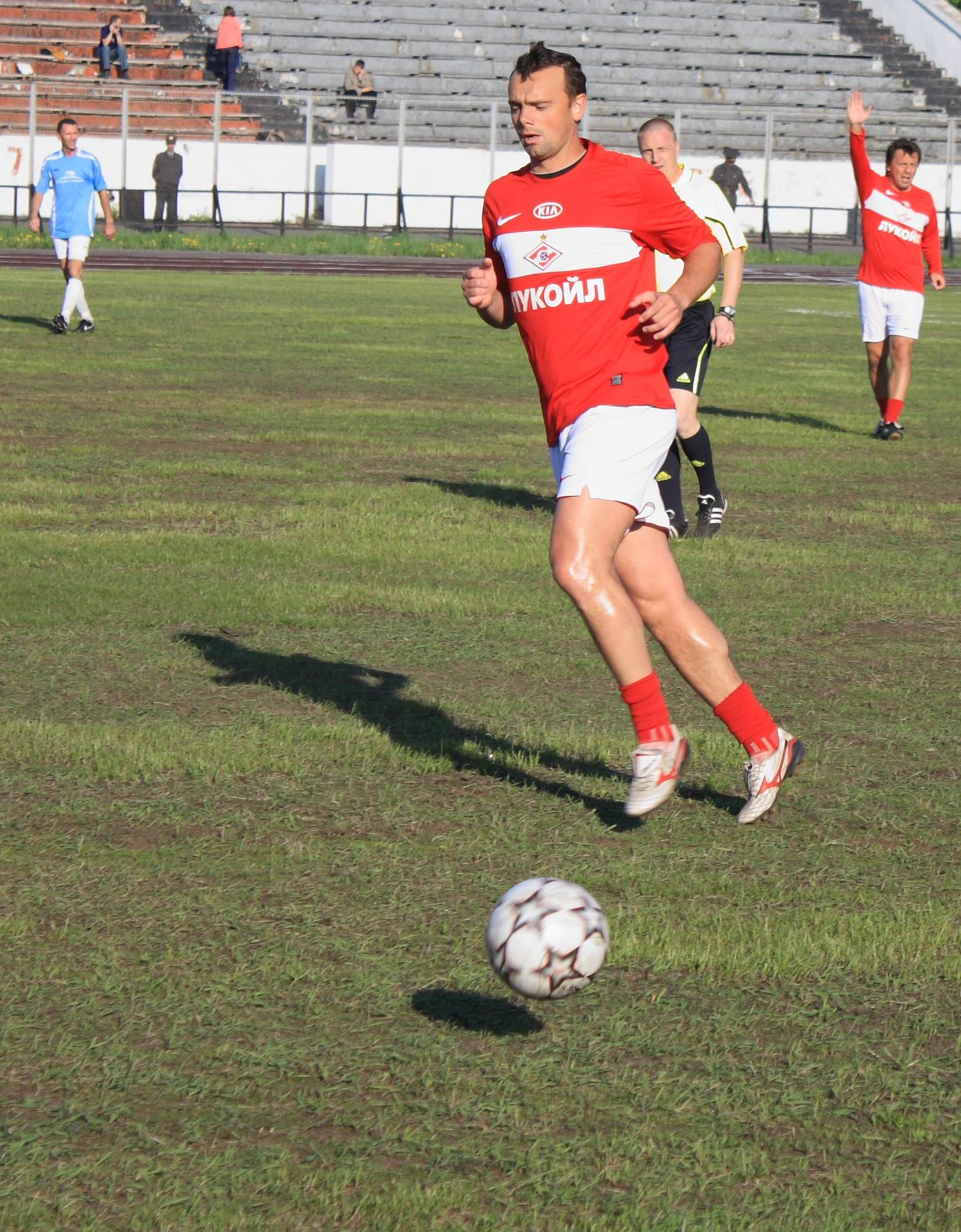

Personal information
- Full name: Eduard Vladimirovich Mor
- Date of birth: 4 October 1977 (age 49)
- Place of birth: Selydove, Ukrainian SSR
- Height: 1.84 m (6 ft 1/2 in)
- Position: Defender

Youth career
- 1993–1994: Khimik Severodonetsk

Senior career*
Years	Team	Apps	(Gls)
1994–1996	Khimik Severodonetsk	81	(16)
1997	Zorya Luhansk	43	(5)
1998	Spartak-d Moscow	40	(2)
1999–2000	Spartak Moscow	31	(1)
1999–2000	→ Spartak-d Moscow	7	(2)
2000–2004	Saturn Ramenskoye	53	(1)
2003	→ Chernomorets Novorossiysk (loan)	11	(0)
2005	Volyn Lutsk	3	(0)
2005	Oryol	18	(0)
2006	Khimki	31	(2)
2007	Torpedo Moscow	30	(1)
2008	Vitebsk	28	(2)
2009	Luch-Energiya Vladivostok	17	(0)

International career
1999	Russia U-21	5	(0)
- * Club domestic league appearances and goals

Eduard Vladimirovich Mor (Russian: Эдуард Владимирович Мор; born 4 October 1977) is a retired Ukrainian and Russian professional footballer.

== Club career ==
He made his debut in the Russian Premier League in 1999 for FC Spartak Moscow.

== Honours ==
- Russian Premier League champion: 1999, 2000.
