= Aleksandr Ignatyev =

Russian footballer

Personal information
- Full name: Aleksandr Sergeyevich Ignatyev
- Date of birth: 7 November 1971 (age 54)
- Place of birth: Leningrad, Russian SFSR
- Height: 1.68 m (5 ft 6 in)
- Position: Midfielder

Youth career
- Turbostroitel Leningrad

Senior career*
Years	Team	Apps	(Gls)
1989	FC Zenit Leningrad	0	(0)
1990–1992	FC Prometei-Dinamo St. Petersburg	91	(4)
1993–1996	FC Zhemchuzhina Sochi	91	(3)
1993–1996	→ FC Zhemchuzhina-2 Sochi	7	(3)
1997–1998	FC Uralan Elista	54	(5)
1999–2000	FC Torpedo Moscow	16	(0)
1999–2000	→ FC Torpedo-d Moscow	7	(0)
2000–2001	FC Lokomotiv Nizhny Novgorod	28	(0)
2002	FC Chkalovets-1936 Novosibirsk	20	(3)
2003	FC Petrotrest St. Petersburg	35	(10)
2004	FC Esil Bogatyr	30	(1)
2005	FC Taraz	3	(0)
2005	FC Lokomotiv St. Petersburg (amateur)		
2005–2006	FC Kukaracha St. Petersburg		
2006	FC Svarog SMU-303 St. Petersburg		
2008–2009	FC Kolomyagi-47 St. Petersburg		
2009	FC Evrostroy Vsevolozhsk		
2010	FC Neva St. Petersburg		
2011–2015	FC Viktoriya-Piter St. Petersburg		
- * Club domestic league appearances and goals

Aleksandr Sergeyevich Ignatyev (Russian: Александр Серге́евич Игнатьев; born 7 November 1971) is a former Russian professional footballer.

== Club career ==
He made his professional debut in the Soviet Second League in 1990 for FC Dynamo Leningrad.

== Honours ==
- Russian Premier League bronze: 2000.
