= Dmitri Sychev =

Russian former footballer

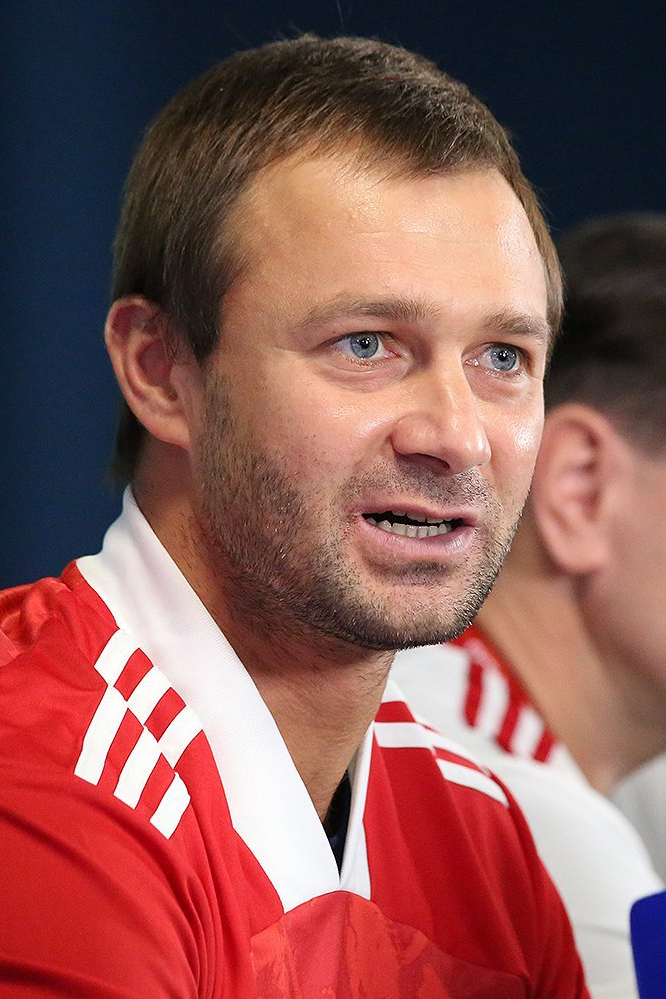
- Sychev in 2021

Personal information
- Full name: Dmitri Yevgenyevich Sychev
- Date of birth: 26 October 1983 (age 43)
- Place of birth: Omsk, Soviet Union
- Height: 1.76 m (5 ft 9 in)
- Positions: Forward; midfielder

Team information
- Current team: Irtysh Omsk (president)

Youth career
- 1993–1998: Dynamo Omsk
- 1998–2000: Smena-Zenit Saint Petersburg

Senior career*
Years	Team	Apps	(Gls)
2000–2001	Spartak Tambov	42	(9)
2002	Spartak Moscow	18	(9)
2002–2003	Marseille	33	(5)
2004–2016	Lokomotiv Moscow	224	(73)
2013	→ Dinamo Minsk (loan)	10	(0)
2013–2014	→ Volga Nizhny Novgorod (loan)	16	(0)
2015–2016	→ Okzhetpes (loan)	19	(3)
2017–2018	Kazanka Moscow	20	(1)
2019	Pyunik	0	(0)
Total		384	(100)

International career
2000	Russia U-17	12	(14)
2002	Russia U-19	7	(6)
2003	Russia U-21	1	(1)
2002–2010	Russia	47	(15)

Managerial career
- 2024–: Irtysh Omsk (president)
- * Club domestic league appearances and goals

Dmitri Yevgenyevich Sychev (Note: His last name is also transcribed as Sytchev, and his first name as Dmitry or Dmitriy.) (Russian: Дмитрий Евгеньевич Сычёв, romanized: ˈdmʲitrʲɪj jɪvˈɡʲenʲjɪvʲɪtɕ sɨˈtɕɵf, IPA: [Ru-Dmitri Yevgenyevich Sychev.ogg]; born 26 October 1983) is a Russian professional football official and a former player who played as a forward or as a midfielder. He is the president of Irtysh Omsk. He was hailed by the international press as "The Russian Michael Owen", because of his pace, and was dubbed "the most sensational young Russian forward since Vladimir Beschastnykh". He was well known for his blinding pace and agility.

== Early life ==
Sychev was born in Omsk, a city in south-central Russia. He spent his formative years at St. Petersburg's famous Smena football academy before joining FC Spartak Tambov, a second division club. At that time he played as a midfielder.

== Club career ==
=== Spartak Moscow and Marseille ===
After having trials at clubs in FC Nantes and FC Metz, Sychev was picked up by Spartak Moscow in January 2002, where he scored eight goals in his first 12 matches, and it was during that time when he was transformed into a striker. With Spartak he reached the final of the 2002 Commonwealth of Independent States Cup. He scored 6 goals and finished second on the top scorer list, after coming in as a substitute in every match he played. He entered the symbolic top players list of the tournament.

In August 2002, Sychev announced he was quitting Spartak, by giving his employers three months' notice. Having already signed a five-year contract with the Russian club he was banned from football for four months by the Russian Professional Football League (RPFL).

After finishing this suspension, Sychev signed a five-year contract with Olympique de Marseille, rejecting an offer from Dynamo Kyiv. He was used as a midfielder, both left and right, but was usually a substitute during his time in France.

=== Lokomotiv Moscow ===
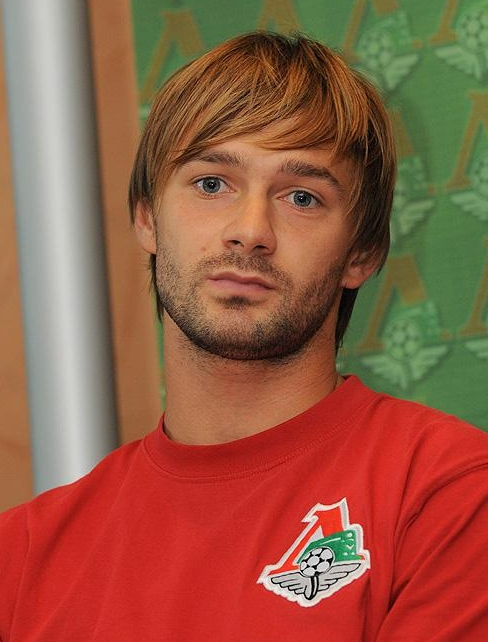
Sychev with Lokomotiv in August 2010

In late January 2004, Sychev returned to Russia to join Lokomotiv Moscow on a four-year contract. His transfer played a role in manager Yuri Syomin's decision to change the starting formation from 5–3–2 to 4–2–3–1 or 4–4–1–1, which would help Sychev form a strong attacking partnership with team's primary playmaker and captain Dmitri Loskov. He went on to claim the 2004 Russian Premier League title and the Russian Footballer of the Year award in his first season back in Russia, courtesy of his 15 goals and 4 assists in 27 league games. The following year, he continued his victorious streak with the club by winning the 2005 Russian Super Cup. However, in August 2005, he sustained an anterior cruciate ligament injury and was forced to miss the rest of the year, which saw Lokomotiv dropping points in the closing stages of the league and eventually losing the title to CSKA Moscow. In May 2007, Sychev also won the 2006–07 Russian Cup. Sychev played mostly as a striker, except the period when Lokomotiv was coached by Anatoliy Byshovets and Rashid Rakhimov respectively. During those times, he was mainly employed as a midfielder. Sychev started playing again in his natural position with the appointment of Yury Syomin. In 2009, he was voted by Lokomotiv fans as the player of the season. In the 2012–13 season, under manager Slaven Bilić, Sychev lost his place in the line-up (only four games in the first half of season, including the national cup).

==== Loan spells ====
In March 2013, Sychev moved to Dinamo Minsk on loan until July of the same year.

In July 2013, after returning from Dinamo Minsk, Sychev moved to fellow Russian Premier League side Volga Nizhny Novgorod on a year-long loan deal. Sychev featured in 16 league games for Volga, failing to score in any of them, and returned to Lokomotiv Moscow at the end of the season following Volga's relegation to the Russian National Football League.

On 16 March 2015, Sychev moved to FC Okzhetpes on a season-long loan deal.

=== Pyunik ===
After over a year away from football, Sychev signed for FC Pyunik on 31 August 2019. On 6 December 2019, he left Pyunik by mutual consent having failed to make a first team appearance for the club. On 10 December 2019, he announced his retirement from playing.

== International career ==
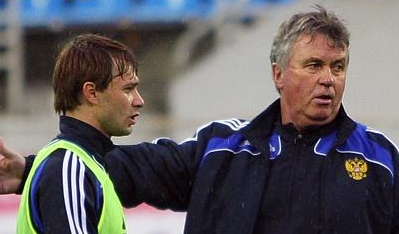
Sychev with Guus Hiddink while on international duty with Russia in October 2008

Sychev was selected to play for the Russian national team at the 2002 FIFA World Cup, where he became the youngest player to appear for the Soviet Union or Russia at 18 years and 222 days. In the event, he scored a goal and set up other three in an otherwise disappointing Russian campaign. This goal made him the fourth youngest goalscorer in the FIFA World Cup.

Sychev was called up to Russia's squad for UEFA Euro 2008 in Austria and Switzerland. Despite playing as a striker at Lokomotiv Moscow, during Guus Hiddink's stint with the Russian national team, he was used as a midfielder. He won his last cap in 2010.

== Post-playing career ==
On 30 January 2024, Sychev was appointed president of his hometown club Irtysh Omsk in the third-tier Russian Second League.

== Television ==
He appeared in the seventh season of ice show contest Ice Age.

== Personal life ==
Besides football, Sychev is a fan of ice hockey and his hometown team Avangard Omsk. He also likes tennis and billiards. Outside of sports, he plays the guitar and was seen rapping at the MTV Russia Music Awards ceremony in Moscow with national teammate Diniyar Bilyaletdinov.

Aside from his native Russian, Sychev also speaks English, French, and plans to learn more.

In 2007, Sychev received a degree from the Russian State University of Physical Education, Sport, Youth and Tourism.

Sychev was in Danila Kozlovsky's directorial debut Coach which was released in 2018. Sychev portrayed Dodin, the player who scored the winning goal for his team.

== Career statistics ==
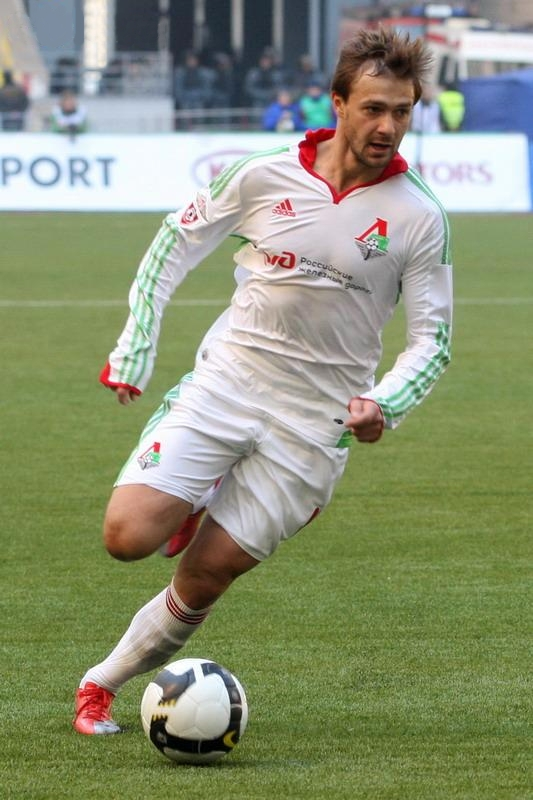
Sychev playing for Lokomotiv in 2009

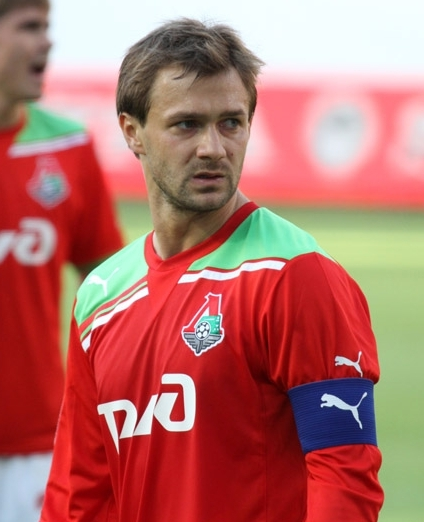
Sychev captaining Lokomotiv in 2011

=== Club ===
Appearances and goals by club, season and competition
Club	Season	League			National cup		League cup		Continental		Other (Note: Includes the Russian Super Cup)		Total	
Club	Season	Division	Apps	Goals	Apps	Goals	Apps	Goals	Apps	Goals	Apps	Goals	Apps	Goals
Spartak Tambov	2000		16	3	0		—		—		—		16	3
Spartak Tambov	2001		26	6	1	1	—		—		—		27	7
Spartak Tambov	Total		42	9	1	1	0	0	0	0	0	0	43	10
Spartak Moscow	2002	Russian Premier League	18	9	1	1	—		—		—		19	10
Olympique Marseille	2002–03	Ligue 1	17	3	1	0	2	1	—		—		20	4
Olympique Marseille	2003–04	Ligue 1	16	2	1	0	1	0	6	1	—		24	3
Olympique Marseille	Total		33	5	2	0	3	1	6	1	0	0	44	7
Lokomotiv Moscow	2004	Russian Premier League	27	15	5	2	—		—		—		32	17
Lokomotiv Moscow	2005	Russian Premier League	21	6	1	0	—		2	2	1	0	25	8
Lokomotiv Moscow	2006	Russian Premier League	24	7	2	1	—		2	0	—		28	7
Lokomotiv Moscow	2007	Russian Premier League	29	11	5	4	—		5	1	—		39	16
Lokomotiv Moscow	2008	Russian Premier League	26	7	1	0	—		—		1	0	28	7
Lokomotiv Moscow	2009	Russian Premier League	27	13	1	0	—		—		—		28	13
Lokomotiv Moscow	2010	Russian Premier League	27	8	1	0	—		2	1	—		30	9
Lokomotiv Moscow	2011–12	Russian Premier League	40	6	3	0	—		10	6	—		53	12
Lokomotiv Moscow	2012–13	Russian Premier League	3	0	1	2	—		—		—		4	2
Lokomotiv Moscow	2013–14	Russian Premier League	0	0	0	0	—		0	0	0	0	0	0
Lokomotiv Moscow	2014–15	Russian Premier League	0	0	0	0	—		0	0	0	0	0	0
Lokomotiv Moscow	2015–16	Russian Premier League	0	0	0	0	—		0	0	0	0	0	0
Lokomotiv Moscow	Total		224	73	20	9	0	0	21	10	2	0	267	92
Dinamo Minsk (loan)	2013	Belarusian Premier League	11	0	2	1	—		2	2	—		15	3
Volga Nizhny Novgorod (loan)	2013–14	Russian Premier League	16	0	0	0	—		—		—		16	0
Okzhetpes (loan)	2015	Kazakhstan Premier League	19	3	1	0	—		—		—		20	3
Kazanka Moscow	2017–18	Russian PFL West	20	1	0	0	—		—		—		20	1
Pyunik	2019–20	Armenian Premier League	0	0	0	0	—		0	0	—		0	0
Career total			383	98	26	12	3	1	29	13	2	0	444	126

=== International ===
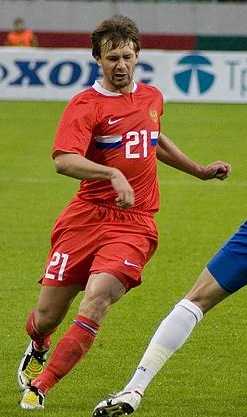
Sychev playing for Russia in 2008

Appearances and goals by national team and year
National team	Year	Apps	Goals
Russia	2002	6	2
Russia	2003	7	1
Russia	2004	8	7
Russia	2005	4	0
Russia	2006	3	1
Russia	2007	9	3
Russia	2008	8	1
Russia	2009	1	0
Russia	2010	1	0
Total		47	15

Scores and results list Russia's goal tally first, score column indicates score after each Sychev goal.

List of international goals scored by Dmitri Sychev
No.	Date	Venue	Opponent	Score	Result	Competition
1	19 May 2002	Dynamo Stadium, Moscow, Russia	(Federal Republic of Yugoslavia) Yugoslavia	1–1	1–1	2002 LG Cup
2	14 June 2002	Ecopa Stadium, Fukuroi, Japan	Belgium	2–3	2–3	2002 FIFA World Cup
3	11 October 2003	Lokomotiv Stadium, Moscow, Russia	Georgia	3–1	3–1	UEFA Euro 2004 qualification
4	31 March 2004	Vasil Levski National Stadium, Sofia, Bulgaria	Bulgaria	1–0	2–2	Friendly
5	31 March 2004	Vasil Levski National Stadium, Sofia, Bulgaria	Bulgaria	2–1	2–2	Friendly
6	18 August 2004	Dynamo Stadium, Moscow, Russia	Lithuania	4–2	4–3	Friendly
7	9 October 2004	Stade Josy Barthel, Luxembourg City, Luxembourg	Luxembourg	1–0	4–0	2006 FIFA World Cup qualification
8	9 October 2004	Stade Josy Barthel, Luxembourg City, Luxembourg	Luxembourg	3–0	4–0	2006 FIFA World Cup qualification
9	9 October 2004	Stade Josy Barthel, Luxembourg City, Luxembourg	Luxembourg	4–0	4–0	2006 FIFA World Cup qualification
10	17 November 2004	Kuban Stadium, Krasnodar, Russia	Estonia	3–0	4–0	2006 FIFA World Cup qualification
11	11 October 2006	Petrovsky Stadium, Saint Petersburg, Russia	Estonia	2–0	2–0	UEFA Euro 2008 qualification
12	2 June 2007	Petrovsky Stadium, Saint Petersburg, Russia	Andorra	4–0	4–0	UEFA Euro 2008 qualification
13	22 August 2007	Lokomotiv Stadium, Moscow, Russia	Poland	1–0	2–2	Friendly
14	21 November 2007	Estadi Comunal, Aixovall, Andorra	Andorra	1–0	1–0	UEFA Euro 2008 qualification
15	23 May 2008	Lokomotiv Stadium, Moscow, Russia	Kazakhstan	6–0	6–0	Friendly

== Honours ==
Lokomotiv Moscow

- Russian Premier League: 2004
- Russian Cup: 2006–07
- Russian Super Cup: 2005
- Commonwealth of Independent States Cup: 2005

Russia

- UEFA European Football Championship Bronze medal: 2008

Individual

- Footballer of the Year in Russia (Sport-Express): 2004
- Footballer of the Year in Russia (Futbol): 2004
