= Maksim Buznikin =

Russian footballer

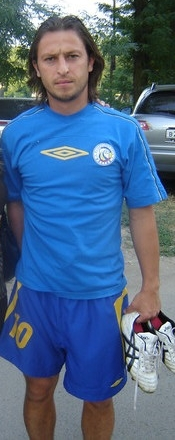
- Maxim Buznikin in Rostov (24 July 2007)

Personal information
- Full name: Maksim Yevgenyevich Buznikin
- Date of birth: 1 March 1977 (age 49)
- Place of birth: Krasnodar, Soviet Union
- Height: 1.70 m (5 ft 7 in)
- Position: Forward

Team information
- Current team: FC Krasnodar (chief scout)

Senior career*
Years	Team	Apps	(Gls)
1993–1995	Kuban Krasnodar	41	(5)
1995	Izumrud Timashyovsk (amateur)		
1996	Lada Togliatti	22	(2)
1997–2000	Spartak Moscow	55	(18)
1999–2000	→ Saturn Moscow Oblast (loan)	25	(5)
2001–2005	Lokomotiv Moscow	68	(12)
2004	→ Rotor Volgograd (loan)	12	(0)
2005–2007	Rostov	31	(10)
2008–2009	Shinnik Yaroslavl	58	(7)
2010	FC Baltika Kaliningrad	18	(1)
2011	FC Saturn-2 Moscow Oblast	19	(3)
2011	FC Nizhny Novgorod	10	(0)
2012	FC Lokomotiv-2 Moscow	21	(1)

International career
1996–2000	Russia U-21	22	(10)
1998–2001	Russia	11	(7)
- * Club domestic league appearances and goals

Maksim Yevgenyevich Buznikin (Russian: Максим Евгеньевич Бузникин; born 1 March 1977) is a Russian football official and a former international forward or attacking midfielder. He worked as a chief scout for FC Krasnodar since 2014. Buznikin spent his prime years playing for Spartak Moscow and Lokomotiv Moscow. In 2005 Buznikin was chosen Rostov's footballer of the year.

== Honours ==
- Russian Premier League champion: 1997, 1998, 1999, 2000, 2002, 2004.
- Russian Premier League runner-up: 2001.
- Russian Premier League bronze: 2005.
- Russian Cup winner: 1998.
- Russian Super Cup winner: 2003.

=== International goals ===
#	Date	Venue	Opponent	Score	Result	Competition
1	1999-01-29	Thống Nhất Stadium, Hanoi, Vietnam	Iran	1 – 0	2–0	Friendly match
2	1999-01-29	Thống Nhất Stadium, Hanoi, Vietnam	Iran	2 – 0	2–0	Friendly match
3	2000-06-04	Stadionul Republican, Chişinău, Moldova	Moldova	0 – 1	0–1	Friendly match
4	2000-08-16	Luzhniki Stadium, Moscow, Russia	Israel	1 – 0	1–0	Friendly match
5	2000-10-11	Dynamo Stadium, Moscow, Russia	Luxembourg	1 – 0	3–0	2002 FIFA World Cup qualification
6	2001-02-28	Theodoros Vardinogiannis Stadium, Heraklion, Greece	Greece	2 – 1	3–3	Friendly match
7	2001-02-28	Theodoros Vardinogiannis Stadium, Heraklion, Greece	Greece	2 – 3	3–3	Friendly match

== European competitions history ==
- UEFA Cup 1997–98 with FC Spartak Moscow: 7 games, 1 goal.
- UEFA Champions League 1998–99 with FC Spartak Moscow: 3 games.
- UEFA Champions League 2001–02 with FC Lokomotiv Moscow: 6 games, 3 goals.
- UEFA Cup 2001–02 with FC Lokomotiv Moscow: 1 game.
- UEFA Champions League 2002–03 with FC Lokomotiv Moscow: 9 games.
- UEFA Champions League 2003–04 with FC Lokomotiv Moscow: 6 games, 1 goal.
