= Alexey Smertin =

Russian footballer and official (born 1975)

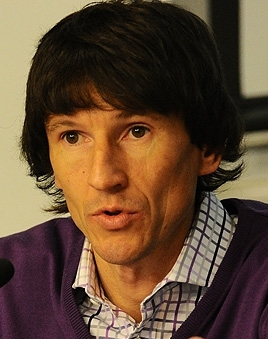
- Smertin in 2011

Personal information
- Full name: Aleksey Gennadyevich Smertin
- Date of birth: 1 May 1975 (age 51)
- Place of birth: Barnaul, Russian SFSR, Soviet Union
- Height: 1.76 m (5 ft 9 in)
- Position: Midfielder

Senior career*
Years	Team	Apps	(Gls)
1992–1993	Dinamo Barnaul	42	(2)
1994–1997	Zarya Leninsk-Kuznetsky	124	(13)
1997–1998	Uralan Elista	49	(3)
1999–2000	Lokomotiv Moscow	39	(7)
2000–2003	Bordeaux	85	(2)
2003–2006	Chelsea	16	(0)
2003–2004	→ Portsmouth (loan)	26	(0)
2005–2006	→ Charlton Athletic (loan)	18	(0)
2006	Dynamo Moscow	22	(0)
2007–2008	Fulham	22	(0)
Total		443	(27)

International career
1998–2006	Russia	55	(0)
- * Club domestic league appearances and goals

Aleksey Gennadyevich Smertin (Russian: Алексе́й Генна́дьевич Сме́ртин, IPA: [ɐlʲɪkˈsʲej ɡʲɪˈnadʲjɪvʲɪtɕ ˈsʲmʲertʲɪn]; born 1 May 1975) is a Russian football official and a former player. He was a fairly versatile player and was able to play in defence as well as midfield. He works in the Russian Football Union in two positions - "director of regional policies and international relations" and "anti-discrimination and anti-racism officer".

He played for clubs in Russia, France and England. Smertin retired from professional football in 2008 after having his contract with Fulham terminated and discovering a new career in politics.

He was the captain of the Russian national team, and earned 55 caps from 1998 to 2006, representing the nation at the 2002 FIFA World Cup and UEFA Euro 2004.

== Club career ==
=== Early career ===
Born in Barnaul, Russian SFSR, Smertin has previously played for Dinamo Barnaul, Zarya Leninsk-Kuznetsky, Uralan Elista, Lokomotiv Moscow, and French team Girondins Bordeaux before moving on to Chelsea. His older brother Yevgeni Smertin played football professionally as well.

=== Chelsea, Portsmouth and Charlton ===
Claudio Ranieri brought Smertin to Chelsea from Bordeaux in August 2003 for £3.45m, before loaning him out to Portsmouth for the 2003–04 season. After some impressive performances at Fratton Park, most notably in Pompey's 1–0 victory over Manchester United, Smertin returned to London. However, Ranieri had now been succeeded by José Mourinho, who had made his own midfield signing in compatriot Tiago Mendes, adding to a midfield that already boasted Frank Lampard, Claude Makélélé, Geremi, and Scott Parker. Smertin only played a bit-part role for the team in 2004–05 as Chelsea won the title, but made enough appearances to earn a medal (16 in total). He did however score his first and only Chelsea goal this season, in the 3–1 Champions League win over Porto.

He was ultimately deemed surplus to requirements at Stamford Bridge and was loaned out to Charlton Athletic for the 2005–06 season. At Charlton, he was a starter and had some impressive performances. In March 2006, he was transferred to Dynamo Moscow, for a fee of £1 million.

=== Dynamo Moscow ===
Smertin played a total of 22 games for Dynamo Moscow before being transfer listed, alongside several other newly signed players, such as Maniche, Francisco Lima, Costinha and Giourkas Seitaridis in Andrey Kobelev's massive attempt at rebuilding the team for the new season.

=== Fulham ===
After Smertin's release from Dynamo Moscow, he returned to England, signing for Fulham on a two-and-a-half-year deal that would see him remain at the club until the summer of 2009. He started most of the opening games of the 2007–08 season but the arrival of fellow-midfielder Danny Murphy on transfer deadline day restricted his playing opportunities. In addition, he suffered from several injury problems. When fit, Simon Davies and Danny Murphy were often preferred as the midfield pairing. On 1 September 2008, after Smertin rejected a loan move to Cardiff City, he and Fulham cancelled his contract with immediate effect.

== International career ==
Smertin made his debut for Russia in 1998 in a 1–0 defeat against Iceland; in the same match he received a red card. He was capped 55 times for Russia, and was selected for the 2002 FIFA World Cup and UEFA Euro 2004. He was made captain in June 2004, and was succeeded in that role by Andrey Arshavin. He became the winner Cyprus International Football Tournament 2003

== Post-playing activities ==
In July 2015, Smertin was an assistant at the draw for 2018 World Cup qualification in St Petersburg.

On 21 February 2017, he was named Russian Football Union anti-racism and discrimination inspector ahead of the 2018 World Cup. In October 2018, he was appointed director of regional policies and international relations of the Russian Football Union (while keeping his anti-racism position). At the same time he left FC Dynamo Moscow advisor position he held up to that point.

== Outside football ==
Smertin is married to fellow Siberian Larisa, and also has a son. After failing to find a new club after leaving Fulham, Smertin turned his hand to politics back home in Russia. In March 2009, he was elected as an MP in the Altai region of Russia.

Smertin later turned to long-distance running, setting a personal best time of 2:48:17 hours at the 2020 Kazan Marathon, aged 45. As of 2026, he owns the fastest known marathon time by a former professional footballer.

== Honours ==
Lokomotiv Moscow

- Russian Cup: 1999–2000

Bordeaux

- Coupe de la Ligue: 2001–02

Chelsea

- Premier League: 2004–05

Individual

- Russian Footballer of the Year, awarded by Futbol and Sport-Express (1999)
