= Yegor Titov =

Russian footballer

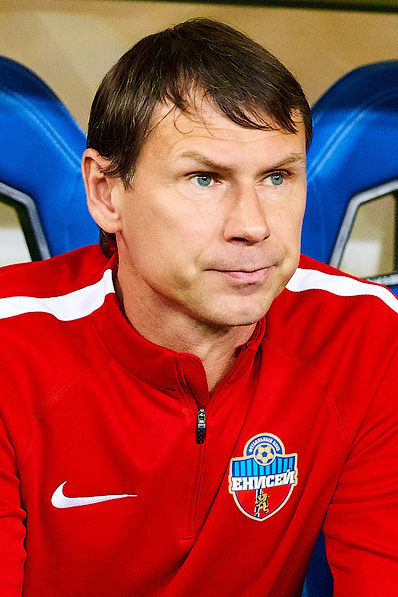
- Titov coaching Yenisey in 2018

Personal information
- Full name: Yegor Ilyich Titov
- Date of birth: 29 May 1976 (age 50)
- Place of birth: Moscow, Soviet Union
- Height: 1.86 m (6 ft 1 in)
- Position: Midfielder

Youth career
- 1983–1992: Spartak Moscow

Senior career*
Years	Team	Apps	(Gls)
1995–2008	Spartak Moscow	324	(86)
2008	Khimki	12	(1)
2009	Lokomotiv Astana	24	(6)
2011–2012	Arsenal Tula (amateur)		
Total		360	(93)

International career
1995–1998	Russia U21	18	(3)
1998–2007	Russia	41	(7)

Managerial career
- 2015–2016: Spartak Moscow (assistant)
- 2017–2019: Yenisey Krasnoyarsk (assistant)
- * Club domestic league appearances and goals

Yegor Ilyich Titov (Егор Ильич Титов; born 29 May 1976) is a Russian football coach and former player who played as an attacking midfielder. He was known for his playmaking abilities, vision, ball control and accurate passing.

== Career ==
Born in Moscow, Titov spent the majority of his club career at Spartak Moscow, starting in 1995, helping them to six consecutive league titles, and winning Russian Player of the Year in 1998 and 2000. He played for Russia at the 2002 FIFA World Cup and has amassed over 30 caps for his country. After a Euro 2004 playoff against Wales he was tested positive for the banned substance bromantan and received a 12-month suspension. Later, former Spartak players Maksim Demenko and Vladyslav Vashchuk along with physio Artyom Katulin blamed Katulin's assistant Anatoly Schukin, who allegedly acted on behalf of manager Andrey Chernyshov. In 2008, Titov had made similar statements in his interview to Sovetsky Sport. After the ban, he has continued playing for Spartak and has been a major figure for the club when Spartak managed to finish 2nd in the 2005, 2006 and 2007 seasons, thus qualifying for the UEFA Champions League.

In 2002, Titov was reportedly close to a move to La Liga side Atlético Madrid, but eventually decided against joining the Spanish outfit.

Titov, who was just several years ago was considered one of Russia's key players stopped playing for the team when he refused to be called up for a Euro 2008 qualifying match against Estonia, saying the reason was because his wife was pregnant and he wants to spend more time with her.

Due to several factors, including a recent severe loss of form and conflicts with Spartak Moscow's manager, Titov became unsettled and, in August 2008, left to join Khimki.

In the beginning of 2009, Yegor signed with the newly formed club Lokomotiv Astana. He joined the Kazakh side with his former teammate Andrey Tikhonov.

He retired from professional football in early 2010. In early 2012, he played several games for Arsenal Tula which played in the fourth-tier Russian Amateur Football League at the time and was managed by his former Spartak and Russia teammate Dmitri Alenichev. Alenichev hired him as his assistant when he was hired as the manager of Spartak Moscow in the summer of 2015.

== Career statistics ==
=== Club ===
Appearances and goals by club, season and competition
Club	Season	League			National cup		Continental		Other		Total	
Club	Season	Division	Apps	Goals	Apps	Goals	Apps	Goals	Apps	Goals	Apps	Goals
Spartak Moscow	1995	Russian Premier League	12	1	2	0	1	0	—		15	1
Spartak Moscow	1996	Russian Premier League	31	5	2	0	6	0	—		39	5
Spartak Moscow	1997	Russian Premier League	31	8	4	0	8	2	—		43	10
Spartak Moscow	1998	Russian Premier League	29	6	5	0	11	4	—		45	10
Spartak Moscow	1999	Russian Premier League	29	11	1	0	10	1	—		40	12
Spartak Moscow	2000	Russian Premier League	24	13	5	1	8	4	—		37	18
Spartak Moscow	2001	Russian Premier League	30	11	2	0	10	0	—		42	11
Spartak Moscow	2002	Russian Premier League	20	4	1	0	—				21	4
Spartak Moscow	2003	Russian Premier League	29	9	6	1	4	0	—		39	7
Spartak Moscow	2004	Russian Premier League	0	0	0	0	0	0	—		0	0
Spartak Moscow	2005	Russian Premier League	28	4	1	0	—				29	4
Spartak Moscow	2006	Russian Premier League	25	7	8	0	8	0	1	1	42	8
Spartak Moscow	2007	Russian Premier League	27	7	5	1	9	4	1	0	42	12
Spartak Moscow	2008	Russian Premier League	9	0	0	0	2	0	—		11	0
Spartak Moscow	Total		324	86	42	3	77	15	2	1	445	105
Khimki	2008	Russian Premier League	12	1	0	0	—				12	1
Lokomotiv Astana	2009	Kazakhstan Premier League	24	6	3	0	—				27	6
Career total			360	93	47	4	77	15	0	0	484	112

=== International ===
Appearances and goals by national team and year
National team	Year	Apps	Goals
Russia	1998	2	0
Russia	1999	8	1
Russia	2000	6	2
Russia	2001	10	2
Russia	2002	7	1
Russia	2003	3	1
Russia	2004	0	0
Russia	2005	1	0
Russia	2006	3	0
Russia	2007	1	0
Total		41	7

Scores and results list Russia's goal tally first, score column indicates score after each Titov goal.

List of international goals scored by Yegor Titov
No.	Date	Venue	Opponent	Score	Result	Competition
1	31 March 1999	Lokomotiv Stadium, Moscow, Russia	Andorra	1–0	6–1	UEFA Euro 2000 qualifying
2	26 April 2000	Central Dynamo Stadium, Moscow, Russia	United States	1–0	2–0	Friendly
3	11 October 2000	Central Dynamo Stadium, Moscow, Russia	Luxembourg	3–0	3–0	2002 FIFA World Cup qualification
4	1 September 2001	Bežigrad Stadium, Ljubljana, Slovenia	Slovenia	1–1	1–2	2002 FIFA World Cup qualification
5	6 October 2001	Dynamo Stadium, Moscow, Russia	Switzerland	4–0	4–0	2002 FIFA World Cup qualification
6	5 June 2002	Kobe Wing Stadium, Kobe, Japan	Tunisia	1–0	2–0	2002 FIFA World Cup
7	11 October 2003	RZD Arena, Moscow, Russia	Georgia	2–1	3–1	UEFA Euro 2004 qualifying

== Honours ==
Spartak Moscow

- Russian Premier League (6): 1996, 1997, 1998, 1999, 2000, 2001
- Russian Cup: 1997–98, 2002–03

Individual

- CIS Cup top goalscorer: 2000 (shared)
