= FC Lokomotiv Moscow in European football =

Russian club in European football

== By competition ==
Information correct as of 11 December 2018.

| Competition | Pld | W | D | L | GF | GA | GD | Win% |
|---|---|---|---|---|---|---|---|---|
| Champions League | 44 | 12 | 8 | 24 | 46 | 63 | −17 | 27.27 |
| Cup Winners' Cup | 20 | 10 | 4 | 6 | 27 | 16 | +11 | 50.00 |
| Europa League | 66 | 29 | 14 | 23 | 101 | 91 | +10 | 43.94 |
| Total | 130 | 51 | 26 | 53 | 174 | 170 | +4 | 39.23 |

== UEFA Cup 1993–94 ==
Manager: Yuri Semin.

=== First round ===
- September 15, 1993 / Juventus FC (Italy) – FC Lokomotiv Moscow 3–0 (R. Baggio 50' 87' Ravanelli 70') / Stadio Renato Dall'Ara, Bologna / Attendance: 26,267

Juventus: Peruzzi, Carrera, Fortunato, Torricelli, Kohler, Júlio César, Marocchi, Conte, Ravanelli, R. Baggio (Del Piero, 89), Möller.
Lokomotiv: Ovchinnikov, Arifullin, Rakhimov, Podpaly (c), Sabitov, Drozdov, Kosolapov, Alenichev, Samatov, Smirnov (Gorkov, 64), Petrov (Garin, 54).

- September 28, 1993 / FC Lokomotiv Moscow - Juventus F.C. 0–1 (Marocchi 53') / Lokomotiv Stadium, Moscow / Attendance: 10,000

Lokomotiv: Ovchinnikov, Arifullin, Rakhimov, Podpaly (c), Sabitov, Fuzaylov (Gorkov, 59), Kosolapov, Alenichev, Samatov, Smirnov, Nikulkin.
Juventus: Peruzzi, Carrera (Porrini, 46), Fortunato, Torricelli, Kohler, Júlio César, Conte (Galia, 75), D. Baggio, Ravanelli, Marocchi, Ban.

== UEFA Cup 1995–96 ==
Manager: Yuri Semin.

=== First round ===
- September 12, 1995 / FC Bayern Munich (Germany) – FC Lokomotiv Moscow 0–1 (Kharlachyov 71') / Olympiastadion, Munich / Attendance: 24,000

Bayern Munich: Kahn, Babbel, Ziege, Strunz (Nerlinger, 15), Helmer, Sforza, Hamann, Zickler (Sutter, 46), Klinsmann, Herzog (Witeczek, 72), Scholl.
Lokomotiv: Ovchinnikov, Arifullin, Drozdov, Kharlachyov, Hovhannisyan, Chugaynov, Kosolapov, Gurenko, Yelyshev, Solomatin, Garin (Maminov, 82).

- September 26, 1995 / FC Lokomotiv Moscow - FC Bayern Munich 0–5 (Klinsmann 26' 35' Herzog 39' Scholl 45' Strunz 79') / Lokomotiv Stadium, Moscow / Attendance: 27,000

Lokomotiv: Ovchinnikov, Arifullin, Drozdov, Kharlachyov, Solomatin (yellow card) 41' (yellow-red card) 65', Chugaynov, Kosolapov, Gurenko (Pashinin, 10, Maminov, 82), Yelyshev, Ye. Kuznetsov, Garin.
Bayern Munich: Kahn, Babbel, Ziege, Strunz (Frey, 87), Helmer, Sforza, Hamann (Zickler, 72), Herzog (Nerlinger, 62), Klinsmann, Scholl, Kostadinov.

== UEFA Cup Winners' Cup 1996–97 ==
Manager: Yuri Semin.

=== First round ===
- September 12, 1996 / FC Lokomotiv Moscow – NK Varteks (Croatia) 1–0 (Cherevchenko 12') / Lokomotiv Stadium, Moscow / Attendance: 1,500

Lokomotiv: Ovchinnikov, Pashinin, Chugaynov, Cherevchenko (Arifullin, 86), Drozdov, Gurenko, Kharlachyov (yellow card) 10' (yellow-red card) 61', Kosolapov (c), Yelyshev, Garin (Snigiryov, 55, Maminov, 73), Janashia.
Varteks: Solomun, Beli (Kovačević, 82), Gregorić, Maretić, Plantak, Borović, Težački (Ivančić, 88), Madunović, Brlenić, Vugrinec (c), Ivanković (Dasović, 77).

- September 26, 1996 / NK Varteks - FC Lokomotiv Moscow 2–1 (Vugrinec 62' 79' – Kosolapov 71') / Stadion Varteks, Varaždin / Attendance: 3,000

Varteks: Solomun, Borović, Kovačević (Ivanković, 43), Madunović, Plantak, Ivančić (Cvetko, 43), Posavec, Težački (Dasović, 66), Brlenić, Mumlek, Vugrinec (c).
Lokomotiv: Ovchinnikov, Solomatin, Hovhannisyan, Cherevchenko, Pashinin, Chugaynov, Kosolapov (c), Gurenko, Janashia (Snigiryov, 80), Maminov (Drozdov, 86), Haras (Yelyshev, 63).

=== Second round ===
- October 17, 1996 / S.L. Benfica (Portugal) - FC Lokomotiv Moscow 1–0 (Pinto 8') / Estádio da Luz, Lisbon / Attendance: 10,000

Benfica: Preud'homme, Calado, Bermúdez, Hélder, Dimas, Jamir, Caires (El Khalej, 57), Pinto (c), Nader (Edgar, 57), Valdo, Panduru.
Lokomotiv: Ovchinnikov, Cherevchenko, Drozdov, Kharlachyov, Hovhannisyan, Chugaynov, Kosolapov (c), Gurenko, Pashinin, Maminov (Smirnov, 59), Haras (Veselov, 70).

- October 31, 1996 / FC Lokomotiv Moscow – S.L. Benfica 2–3 (Solomatin 8' Haras 59' – Panduru 48' Donizete 63' Pinto 89') / Lokomotiv Stadium, Moscow / Attendance: 7,000

Lokomotiv: Ovchinnikov, Cherevchenko, Drozdov, Kharlachyov, Pashinin, Chugaynov, Kosolapov (c), Gurenko, Solomatin, Maminov, Haras (Veselov, 76).
Benfica: Preud'homme, Calado, Bermúdez, Hélder, Dimas, Jamir (Panduru, 40), El Khalej, Pinto (c), Donizete (Airez, 82), Valdo, Iliev (Jorge Soares, 82).

== UEFA Cup Winners' Cup 1997–98 ==
Manager: Yuri Semin.

=== First round ===
- September 18, 1997 / FC Belshina Bobruisk (Belarus) - FC Lokomotiv Moscow 1–2 (Khlebasolaw 14' (pen.) – Loskov 49' Borodyuk 71') / Dynama Stadium, Minsk / Attendance: 7,000

Belshina: Svirkov, Kovalevich, Timofeyev, Shustikov, Balashow, I. Gradoboyev, E. Gradoboyev, Khripach, Smirnykh (Borisik, 69), Khlebasolaw, Putrash (Kovtun, 63).
Lokomotiv: Podshivalov, Solomatin, Drozdov, Kharlachyov, Arifullin, Chugaynov (c), Smirnov, Borodyuk, Janashia (Bulykin, 79), Loskov, Cherevchenko.

- October 2, 1997 / FC Lokomotiv Moscow - FC Belshina Bobruisk 3–0 (Maminov 23' Kharlachyov 42' Loskov 73') / Lokomotiv Stadium, Moscow / Attendance: 4,000

Lokomotiv: Bidzhiyev, Solomatin, Drozdov, Kharlachyov, Arifullin, Chugaynov (c), Smirnov (Sarkisyan, 64), Cherevchenko (Pashinin, 75), Janashia (Veselov, 69), Loskov, Maminov.
Belshina: Svirkov, Apalkov, Timofeyev, Khripach (Kovtun, 46), Razumovich, Kovalevich, I. Gradoboyev, E. Gradoboyev, Smirnykh (Putrash, 46), Balashow (Borisik, 65), Khlebasolaw.

=== Second round ===
- October 23, 1997 / FC Lokomotiv Moscow – Kocaelispor (Turkey) 2–1 (Kharlachyov 33' Janashia 82' - Turan 73') / Lokomotiv Stadium, Moscow / Attendance: 3,500

Lokomotiv: Bidzhiyev, Solomatin, Drozdov (Pashinin, 90), Kharlachyov, Chugaynov (c), Gurenko, Cherevchenko, Veselov (Smirnov, 46), Maminov (Sarkisyan, 81), Janashia, Loskov.
Kocaelispor: Stângaciu, Mirković, Osman, Turan, Zeki, Evren, Faruk (Mustafa, 46), Moshoeu, Nuri, Soner, Metin.

- November 6, 1997 / Kocaelispor – FC Lokomotiv Moscow 0–0 / İzmit İsmetpaşa Stadium, İzmit / Attendance: 14,500

Kocaelispor: Stângaciu, Mirković, Metin, Osman (Evren, 65), Turan, Zeki, Nuri, Faruk (Dąbrowski, 54), Moshoeu, Soner (Ahmet, 84), Mustafa.
Lokomotiv: Bidzhiyev, Solomatin, Drozdov, Kharlachyov, Arifullin, Chugaynov (c), Gurenko, Smirnov (Sarkisyan, 82), Veselov (Maminov, 73), Pashinin, Loskov.

=== Quarter-finals ===
- March 5, 1998 / AEK Athens F.C. (Greece) – FC Lokomotiv Moscow 0–0 / Nikos Goumas Stadium, Athens / Attendance: 27,000

AEK Athens: Atmatsidis, Kopitsis (Sebwe, 59), Manolas, Karagiannis (yellow card) 51' (yellow-red card) 90', Kasapis, Grétarsson, Macheridis (Doboş, 66 (red card) 75'), Marcelo, Savevski, Nikolaidis, Maladenis.
Lokomotiv: Nigmatullin, Solomatin, Drozdov, Cherevchenko, Arifullin, Chugaynov (c), Kosolapov, Gurenko, Borodyuk (Smirnov, 69), Loskov (Maminov, 46), Haras (Janashia, 46).

- March 19, 1998 / FC Lokomotiv Moscow – AEK Athens F.C. 2–1 (Kharlachyov 54' Chugaynov 90' - Kopitsis 67' (pen.)) / Lokomotiv Stadium, Moscow / Attendance: 11,256

Lokomotiv: Nigmatullin, Solomatin, Cherevchenko, Kharlachyov, Arifullin, Chugaynov (c), Kosolapov, Gurenko, Maminov, Loskov (Janashia, 25), Haras.
AEK Athens: Atmatsidis, Kopitsis, Manolas, Kalitzakis, Kostenoglou, Kasapis, Grétarsson, Macheridis, Savevski (Sebwe, 64), Maladenis (Kefalas, 87), Nikolaidis.

=== Semi-finals ===
- April 2, 1998 / VfB Stuttgart (Germany) – FC Lokomotiv Moscow 2–1 (Akpoborie 43' Bobic 90' - Janashia 23') / Gottlieb-Daimler-Stadion, Stuttgart / Attendance: 14,500

Stuttgart: Wohlfahrt, Spanring, Verlaat, Berthold, Poschner, Haber, Stojkovski (Hagner, 46), Yakin (Lisztes, 71), Balakov, Akpoborie, Bobic.
Lokomotiv: Nigmatullin, Solomatin, Drozdov, Kharlachyov, Arifullin, Chugaynov (c), Kosolapov (Maminov, 55), Gurenko, Janashia, Cherevchenko, Haras (Smirnov, 55).

- April 16, 1998 / FC Lokomotiv Moscow – VfB Stuttgart 0–1 (Bobic 23') / Lokomotiv Stadium, Moscow / Attendance: 20,000

Lokomotiv: Nigmatullin, Solomatin, Maminov, Kharlachyov, Arifullin, Chugaynov (c), Kosolapov, Gurenko, Janashia, Loskov (Veselov, 59), Smirnov (Hovhannisyan, 73).
Stuttgart: Wohlfahrt, Spanring, Stojkovski, Berthold, Verlaat, Soldo, Poschner (Schneider, 90), Haber, Akpoborie (Endreß, 82), Balakov, Bobic.

== UEFA Cup Winners' Cup 1998–99 ==
Manager: Yuri Semin.

=== First round ===
- September 17, 1998 / CSKA Kyiv (Ukraine) – FC Lokomotiv Moscow 0–2 (Kharlachyov 24' Janashia 51') / Dynamo Stadium, Kyiv / Attendance: 6,500

CSKA Kyiv: Reva, Levchenko, Balytskiy, Ulyanitskiy, Hrehul, Bezhenar, Oliynyk (Novokhatskiy, 78), Kostyshyn (Oleksienko, 26), Zakarlyuka (Daraselia, 53), Leonenko, Tsykhmeystruk (c).
Lokomotiv: Nigmatullin, Arifullin, Drozdov, Kharlachyov, Pashinin, Chugaynov (c), Solomatin, Gurenko, Janashia (Bulykin, 90), Borodyuk (Haras, 80), Lavrik.

- October 1, 1998 / FC Lokomotiv Moscow – CSKA Kyiv 3–1 (Bulykin 19' 51' Janashia 69' – Bezhenar 13') / Lokomotiv Stadium, Moscow / Attendance: 5,000

Lokomotiv: Nigmatullin, Arifullin (Cherevchenko, 74), Drozdov (Loskov, 57), Kharlachyov, Lavrik, Chugaynov (c), Solomatin, Gurenko, Janashia, Borodyuk, Bulykin (Pashinin, 70).
CSKA Kyiv: Reva, Levchenko (yellow card) 5' (yellow-red card) 35', Novokhatskiy (Revut, 46), Balytskiy, Hrehul, Bezhenar, Karyaka (Daraselia, 73), Shkapenko, Zakarlyuka, Leonenko (Korenev, 46), Tsykhmeystruk (c).

=== Second round ===
- October 22, 1998 / FC Lokomotiv Moscow – S.C. Braga (Portugal) 3–1 (Bulykin 22' 35' Chugaynov 60' (pen.) – Odair 47') / Lokomotiv Stadium, Moscow / Attendance: 16,100

Lokomotiv: Nigmatullin, Cherevchenko, Drozdov, Kharlachyov (Sarkisyan, 81), Solomatin, Chugaynov (c), Borodyuk, Gurenko, Janashia, Loskov (Lavrik, 90), Bulykin.
Braga: Morais (red card) 89', Azevedo, Odair, Mozer, Sérgio, Silva (Quim, 89), Lino, Karoglan (Toni, 75), Artur Jorge (Castanheira, 74), Jordão, Bruno.

- November 5, 1998 / S.C. Braga – FC Lokomotiv Moscow 1–0 (Karoglan 13') / Estádio Primeiro de Maio, Braga / Attendance: 10,000

Braga: Quim, Azevedo, Odair, Mozer, Silva, Lino (Formoso, 66), Karoglan, Artur Jorge (Sérgio, 83), Jordão, Gamboa (Toni, 60), Bruno.
Lokomotiv: Nigmatullin, Cherevchenko, Drozdov (Lavrik, 32), Kharlachyov (Sarkisyan, 64), Solomatin, Chugaynov (c), Borodyuk, Gurenko, Janashia (Arifullin, 89), Loskov, Bulykin.

=== Quarter-finals ===
- March 4, 1999 / FC Lokomotiv Moscow – Maccabi Haifa (Israel) 3–0 (Janashia 48' 78' 90') / Lokomotiv Stadium, Moscow / Attendance: 22,000

Lokomotiv: Nigmatullin, Arifullin (Cherevchenko, 36), Drozdov, Sarkisyan (Kharlachyov, 60), Solomatin (Lavrik, 43), Chugaynov (c), Smertin, Gurenko, Janashia, Loskov, Bulykin.
Maccabi Haifa: Davidovich, Harazi, Benado, Keisi, Hromádko (Duro, 63), Nagar, Benayoun (Silvas, 86), Jano, Harazi (Paço, 73), Melamed, Brzęczek.

- March 18, 1999 / Maccabi Haifa – FC Lokomotiv Moscow 0–1 (Chugaynov 72' (pen.)) / Kiryat Eliezer Stadium, Haifa / Attendance: 18,500

Maccabi Haifa: Davidovich, Jano, Harazi, Benado, Keisi, Kopel, Nagar (Duro, 75), Brzęczek, Paço (Hromádko, 70), Benayoun, Harazi (Katan, 32).
Lokomotiv: Nigmatullin, Arifullin, Drozdov, Maminov (Sarkisyan, 81), Lavrik, Chugaynov (c), Smertin, Gurenko, Janashia, Loskov (Kharlachyov, 46), Bulykin (Borodyuk, 68).

=== Semi-finals ===
- April 8, 1999 / FC Lokomotiv Moscow – Lazio (Italy) 1–1 (Janashia 60' – Bokšić 77') / Lokomotiv Stadium, Moscow / Attendance: 23,000

Lokomotiv: Nigmatullin, Arifullin, Drozdov, Kharlachyov (Maminov, 83), Cherevchenko, Chugaynov (c), Smertin (Loskov, 46), Gurenko, Janashia, Lavrik, Bulykin (Borodyuk, 83).
Lazio: Marchegiani, Negro, Pancaro, de la Peña, Favalli (c), Mihajlović, Lombardo, Almeyda, Salas (Mancini, 74), Stanković, Vieri (Bokšić, 63).

- April 22, 1999 / Lazio – FC Lokomotiv Moscow 0–0 / Stadio Olimpico, Rome / Attendance: 20,000

Lazio: Marchegiani, Negro, Nesta (c), Couto (Almeyda, 46), Pancaro, Mihajlović, Lombardo, Nedvěd, Stanković, Mancini (de la Peña, 76), Vieri (Bokšić, 88).
Lokomotiv: Nigmatullin, Arifullin, Lavrik, Kharlachyov (Maminov, 66; Borodyuk, 84), Cherevchenko, Chugaynov (c), Smertin, Gurenko, Janashia, Loskov, Bulykin.

== UEFA Cup 1999–2000 ==
Manager: Yuri Semin.

=== Qualifying round ===
- August 12, 1999 / (Belarus) BATE Borisov – FC Lokomotiv Moscow 1–7 (Lisovskiy 72' - Janashia 6' 34' 60' Loskov 24' Sarkisyan 55' Bulykin 74' 86') / Haradzki Stadium, Barysaw / Attendance: 6,000

BATE Borisov: Fyedarovich, Goncharenko, Skripchenko, Tikhomirov, Lashankow, Yermakovich (Lisovskiy, 36), Arzamastsev (Baranaw, 20), Nevinskiy, Kutuzov, Kuznyatsow (Miroshkin, 62), Pyatrawskas.
Lokomotiv: Nigmatullin, Cherevchenko, Lavrik, Kharlachyov, Hovhannisyan (Drozdov, 50), Chugaynov (c), Smertin (Maminov, 71), Pashinin, Janashia, Loskov (Bulykin, 46), Sarkisyan.

- August 25, 1999 / FC Lokomotiv Moscow – BATE Borisov 5–0 (Chugaynov 17' Loskov 23' Smertin 36' Kharlachyov 66' 75') / Lokomotiv Stadium, Moscow / Attendance: 9,000

Lokomotiv: Poliakov, Arifullin, Drozdov, Lavrik, Solomatin (Pashinin, 46), Chugaynov (c), Smertin (Kharlachyov, 46), Sarkisyan, Maminov, Loskov, Bulykin (Pimenov, 46).
BATE Borisov: Khamutowski, Miroshkin, Rahozhkin (Kuznyatsow, 46), Arzamastsev, Tikhomirov, Lashankow (Akulich, 59), Nevinskiy, Dzivakow, Skripchenko, Goncharenko (Doroshkevich, 46), Baranaw.

=== First round ===
- September 16, 1999 / (Denmark) Lyngby BK - FC Lokomotiv Moscow 1–2 (Bidstrup 66' – Chugaynov 13' Bulykin 38') / Lyngby Stadion, Kongens Lyngby / Attendance: 1,474

Lyngby: Fahlström, Bidstrup (Andie, 79), Johansen (c), Birn, Hermansen, Magleby, Hindsberg (Havlykke, 46), Vinzents, Jensen, M. Petersen, Lars Larsen.
Lokomotiv: Nigmatullin, Arifullin (Solomatin, 83), Drozdov (Maminov, 46), Kharlachyov, Hovhannisyan (Cherevchenko, 66), Chugaynov (c), Smertin, Sarkisyan, Pashinin, Loskov, Bulykin.

- September 30, 1999 / FC Lokomotiv Moscow - Lyngby BK 3–0 (Kharlachyov 20' Drozdov 43' Janashia 44') / Lokomotiv Stadium, Moscow / Attendance: 8,000

Lokomotiv: Nigmatullin, Arifullin, Drozdov, Kharlachyov, Cherevchenko (red card) 35', Chugaynov (c), Smertin (Solomatin, 62), Pashinin, Janashia (Maminov, 70), Loskov (Semenenko, 46), Sarkisyan.
Lyngby: Fahlström, Ayeni (yellow card) 40' (yellow-red card) 59', Tengstedt (Jensen, 58), Johansen (c), Birn, Hermansen (Lüthje, 76), Magleby, Hindsberg, Vinzents (Christensen, 58), M. Petersen, Lars Larsen.

=== Second round ===
- October 21, 1999 / (England) Leeds United - FC Lokomotiv Moscow 4–1 (Bowyer 27' 45' Smith 56' Kewell 83' – Loskov 81') / Elland Road, Leeds / Attendance: 37,814

Leeds United: Martyn, Kelly, Harte, McPhail, Radebe (c), Woodgate, Smith, Bridges (Huckerby, 62), Batty, Kewell, Bowyer.
Lokomotiv: Nigmatullin, Arifullin, Drozdov, Kharlachyov, Lavrik, Chugaynov (c), Smertin, Pashinin (Hovhannisyan, 60), Janashia (Bulykin, 39), Loskov, Sarkisyan (Maminov, 76).

- November 4, 1999 / FC Lokomotiv Moscow - Leeds United 0–3 (Harte 16' (pen.) Bridges 28' 45') / Lokomotiv Stadium, Moscow / Attendance: 9,850

Lokomotiv: Nigmatullin, Arifullin, Lavrik, Pashinin (Kharlachyov, 46), Hovhannisyan (Semenenko, 77), Chugaynov (c), Smertin, Solomatin, Bulykin (Pimenov, 74), Loskov, Sarkisyan.
Leeds United: Martyn, Kelly, Harte, Batty, Radebe (c), Woodgate, McPhail (Hopkin, 80), Bridges, Bakke, Kewell (Huckerby, 66), Bowyer (Haaland, 46).

== UEFA Champions League 2000–01 ==
Manager: Yuri Semin.

=== Third qualifying round ===
- August 8, 2000 / (Turkey) Beşiktaş – FC Lokomotiv Moscow 3–0 (Nihat 11' Nouma 80' Karhan 89') / BJK İnönü Stadium, Istanbul / Attendance: 20,000

Beşiktaş: Shorunmu, Karhan, Tayfur (c), Ümit (Rahim, 46), Halilagić, Khlestov (Erman, 38), Ahmet (Murat, 60), Nouma, Nihat, Mehmet, Münch.
Lokomotiv: Nigmatullin, Nizhegorodov, Drozdov, Evseev, Pashinin, Chugaynov (c), Bulykin (Sarkisyan, 83), Lavrik, Janashia (Pimenov, 65), Loskov, Kharlachyov (Solomatin, 57).

- August 23, 2000 / FC Lokomotiv Moscow - Beşiktaş 1–3 (Cherevchenko 51' – Nouma 29' Nihat 72' Tayfur 87') / Lokomotiv Stadium, Moscow / Attendance: 18,000

Lokomotiv: Nigmatullin, Cherevchenko, Drozdov (Evseev, 69), Lavrik, Nizhegorodov, Chugaynov (c), Sarkisyan, Pimenov, Janashia (Bulykin, 68), Loskov, Kharlachyov (Azevedo, 46).
Beşiktaş: Shorunmu, Karhan (Yasin, 80), Tayfur (c), Ümit, Halilagić (Rahim, 84), Nihat, Ahmet, Erman, Nouma (Khlestov, 63), İbrahim, Münch.

== UEFA Cup 2000–01 ==
Manager: Yuri Semin.

=== First round ===
- September 14, 2000 / FC Lokomotiv Moscow – (Bulgaria) Naftex Burgas 4–2 (Sarkisyan 20' Tsymbalar 32' Janashia 62' Pimenov 64' – Petrov 10' Timnev 55') / Luzhniki Stadium, Moscow / Attendance: 5,000

Lokomotiv: Nigmatullin, Cherevchenko, Drozdov, Evseev, Sennikov, Chugaynov (c), Sarkisyan, Pimenov (Bulykin, 64), Janashia, Kharlachyov, Tsymbalar (Maminov, 60).
Naftex Burgas: Simeonov, Hristov, Branimirov, Krastev, Petrov, Parola (Sakaliev, 69), Kiselichkov, Dimitrov, Timnev (Petkov, 85), Trendafilov (Mechechiev, 69), Orachev.

- September 28, 2000 / Naftex Burgas – FC Lokomotiv Moscow 0–0 / Neftochimik Stadium, Burgas / Attendance: 13,000

Naftex Burgas: Gospodinov, Hristov (Ibraimov, 52), Branimirov, Krastev (Sakaliev, 77), Petrov, Parola, Kiselichkov, Dimitrov, Timnev, Trendafilov (Spasov, 62), Orachev.
Lokomotiv: Nigmatullin, Nizhegorodov, Drozdov, Evseev, Pashinin, Chugaynov (c), Sennikov, Lavrik, Janashia (Bulykin, 80), Pimenov (Maminov, 46), Kharlachyov.

=== Second round ===
- October 26, 2000 / FC Lokomotiv Moscow – (Slovakia) Inter Bratislava 1–0 (Loskov 36' (pen.)) / Dynamo Stadium, Moscow / Attendance: 4,000

Lokomotiv: Nigmatullin, Nizhegorodov, Drozdov, Evseev, Pashinin (Cherevchenko, 41), Chugaynov (c), Sarkisyan, Sennikov, Janashia (Teryokhin, 79), Loskov, Maminov (Kharlachyov, 60).
Inter Bratislava: Hýll (c), Čišovský, Šuchančok, Ševela, Dzúrik, Ľalík (Gerich, 79), Kratochvíl, Chrenko, Németh, Babnič (Czinege, 60), Pinte.

- November 9, 2000 / Inter Bratislava - FC Lokomotiv Moscow 1–2 (Čišovský 47' – Chugaynov 31' Janashia 69') / Inter-Bratislava Stadium, Bratislava / Attendance: 3,280

Inter Bratislava: Hýll (c), Hornyák, Šuchančok, Gerich, Dzúrik, Ľalík (Čišovský, 46), Kratochvíl, Chrenko, Czinege, Babnič, Németh.
Lokomotiv: Nigmatullin, Nizhegorodov, Drozdov, Evseev, Cherevchenko (Kharlachyov, 77), Chugaynov (c), Sarkisyan, Sennikov, Janashia, Loskov (Maminov, 52), Bulykin (Lavrik, 65).

=== Third round ===
- November 23, 2000 / FC Lokomotiv Moscow - (Spain) Rayo Vallecano 0–0 / Lokomotiv Stadium, Moscow / Attendance: 7,500

Lokomotiv: Nigmatullin, Nizhegorodov, Drozdov, Evseev (Lavrik, 85), Cherevchenko, Chugaynov (c), Sarkisyan (Maminov, 55), Sennikov, Janashia (Teryokhin, 65), Kharlachyov, Bulykin.
Rayo Vallecano: Keller, Mingo, de Quintana, Alcázar (Bolo, 46), Míchel (Setvalls, 85), Quevedo, Bolić (Iglesias, 76), Ballesteros, Mauro, Poschner, Pablo Sanz.

- December 7, 2000 / Rayo Vallecano – FC Lokomotiv Moscow 2–0 (Bolić 65' Alcázar 68') / Estadio Teresa Rivero, Madrid / Attendance: 10,000

Rayo Vallecano: Keller, Mingo, de Quintana, Alcázar, Míchel, Quevedo (Setvalls, 83), Bolić (Pablo Sanz, 73), Ballesteros, Poschner, Bolo, Helder (Mauro, 46).
Lokomotiv: Nigmatullin, Nizhegorodov, Drozdov, Evseev, Cherevchenko, Chugaynov (c), Sarkisyan (Janashia, 69), Sennikov, Maminov, Kharlachyov, Bulykin.

== UEFA Champions League 2001–02 ==
Manager: Yuri Semin.

=== Third qualifying round ===
- August 7, 2001 / FC Lokomotiv Moscow - (Austria) Tirol Innsbruck 3–1 (Lekgetho 2' Izmailov 37' Ignashevich 79' – Kirchler 19') / Saturn Stadium, Ramenskoye / Attendance: 16,000

Lokomotiv: Nigmatullin, Nizhegorodov, Lekgetho, Chugaynov (c), Izmailov, Maminov, Obiorah (Buznikin, 72), Loskov (Ignashevich, 75), Sennikov, Obradović, Pimenov (Janashia, 61).
Tirol Innsbruck: Ziegler, Ibertsberger, Kogler, Wazinger, Zwyssig, Kirchler (c), Panis (Prudlo, 34), Ježek (Scharrer, 74), Gilewicz, Brzęczek, Hörtnagl.

- August 22, 2001 / Tirol Innsbruck - FC Lokomotiv Moscow 0–1 (Maminov 51') / Tivoli-Neu, Innsbruck / Attendance: 18,000

Tirol Innsbruck: Ziegler, Ibertsberger, Kogler, Ježek, Zwyssig, Kirchler, Marasek, Baur (c), Gilewicz, Brzęczek, Scharrer (Mair, 46; Glieder, 72).
Lokomotiv: Nigmatullin, Nizhegorodov, Obradović, Lekgetho, Ignashevich, Chugaynov (c), Izmailov (Maminov, 46), Pimenov (Drozdov, 78), Obiorah, Loskov, Sennikov.

FC Tirol Innsbruck claimed that there was a Russian player (Pimenov) who should have been sent off in the last minutes of the game, since he had already been booked with a yellow card and the referee, Mario van der Ende, showed the second card to the wrong player. UEFA decided that the whole game be repeated at the same venue and the original score be cancelled.

- September 8, 2001 / Tirol Innsbruck – FC Lokomotiv Moscow 1–0 (Brzęczek 30') / Tivoli-Neu, Innsbruck / Attendance: 15,500

Tirol Innsbruck: Ziegler, Ibertsberger (Glieder, 61), Kogler, Ježek, Zwyssig, Kirchler, Marasek (Sidibe, 77), Baur (c), Gilewicz, Brzęczek, Hörtnagl (yellow card) 35' (yellow-red card) 64'.
Lokomotiv: Nigmatullin, Nizhegorodov, Lekgetho, Ignashevich, Chugaynov (c), Izmailov, Maminov, Obiorah, Loskov (Janashia, 57), Sennikov, Obradović.

=== First group stage, Group A ===
- September 11, 2001 / FC Lokomotiv Moscow - (Belgium) Anderlecht 1–1 (Maminov 18' – Hendrikx 14') / Dynamo Stadium, Moscow / Attendance: 18,500

Lokomotiv: Nigmatullin, Sennikov, Drozdov, Lekgetho, Ignashevich, Chugaynov (c), Izmailov, Maminov, Obradović, Pimenov (Janashia, 75), Buznikin (Vučićević, 66).
Anderlecht: De Wilde, Ilić, Hendrikx, Vanderhaeghe, De Boeck (c), Crasson, Hasi, Dindane (Seol, 88), Mornar (Van Hout, 90+2), De Bilde (Stoica, 77), Pirard.

- September 19, 2001 / (Spain) Real Madrid - FC Lokomotiv Moscow 4–0 (Munitis 39' Figo 64' (pen.) Roberto Carlos 81' Sávio 87') / Santiago Bernabéu Stadium, Madrid / Attendance: 45,000

Real Madrid: Casillas, Salgado, Roberto Carlos (Solari, 84), Hierro, Karanka, Conceição (Celades, 77), Raúl, Makélélé, Munitis, Figo (McManaman, 88), Sávio.
Lokomotiv: Nigmatullin, Drozdov, Lekgetho, Chugaynov (c), Izmailov, Maminov, Obiorah, Loskov (Buznikin, 60), Cherevchenko, Obradović (Vučićević, 75), Pimenov.

- September 26, 2001 / (Italy) Roma – FC Lokomotiv Moscow 2–1 (Chugaynov 69' (o.g.) Totti 79' - Obradović 58') / Stadio Olimpico, Rome / Attendance: 40,000

Roma: Antonioli, Cafu (Guigou, 61), Zebina, Samuel, Zago, Candela, Tommasi (Assunção, 61), Lima, Totti, Montella (Batistuta, 46), Delvecchio.
Lokomotiv: Nigmatullin, Chugaynov (c), Cherevchenko, Obradović, Maminov, Izmailov, Lekgetho, Loskov, Drozdov, Pimenov (Buznikin, 73), Ignashevich.

- October 16, 2001 / FC Lokomotiv Moscow – Roma 0–1 (Cafu 78') / Dynamo Stadium, Moscow / Attendance: 16,000

Lokomotiv: Nigmatullin, Lekgetho, Ignashevich, Chugaynov (c), Izmailov, Maminov, Obiorah, Loskov, Cherevchenko, Obradović, Pimenov.
Roma: Antonioli, Cafu (Fuser, 90+1), Zago, Lima, Totti (c), Emerson, Zebina, Tommasi (Assunção, 83), Samuel, Batistuta, Guigou.

- October 24, 2001 / Anderlecht - FC Lokomotiv Moscow 1–5 (Ilić 2' – Izmailov 13' Sennikov 28' Pimenov 58' Buznikin 63' 68') / Constant Vanden Stock Stadium, Brussels / Attendance: 22,502

Anderlecht: De Wilde, Ilić, Hendrikx, Vanderhaeghe, De Boeck (c), Crasson, El-Said (De Bilde, 46), Dindane (Jestrović, 64), Mornar, Hasi, Iachtchouk (Karaca, 52).
Lokomotiv: Nigmatullin, Sennikov, Lekgetho (Nizhegorodov, 84), Ignashevich, Chugaynov (c), Cherevchenko, Obiorah (Buznikin, 54), Izmailov, Maminov, Loskov, Pimenov (Drozdov, 76).

- October 30, 2001 / FC Lokomotiv Moscow - Real Madrid 2–0 (Buznikin 30' Cherevchenko 50') / Dynamo Stadium, Moscow / Attendance: 15,000

Lokomotiv: Nigmatullin, Lekgetho, Ignashevich, Chugaynov (c) (Obradović, 24), Izmailov, Maminov, Loskov, Buznikin (Obiorah, 74), Cherevchenko (Drozdov, 78), Sennikov, Pimenov.
Real Madrid: César, Helguera, McManaman (Valdo, 61), Morientes (c) (Aranda, 61), Celades, Solari, Munitis, Makélélé (Rubén, 72), Miñambres, Bravo, Pavón.

== UEFA Cup 2001–02 ==
Manager: Yuri Semin.

=== Third round ===
- November 20, 2001 / (Israel) Hapoel Tel Aviv – FC Lokomotiv Moscow 2–1 (Osterc 43' Domb 90' - Izmailov 57') / Bloomfield Stadium, Tel Aviv / Attendance: 14,500

Hapoel Tel Aviv: Elimelech, Bakhar, Gershon (c), Domb (Hilel, 90+3), Antebi, Abukasis, Halmai, Onyshchenko (Balili, 86), Tuama (Luz, 63), Osterc, Cleşcenco.
Lokomotiv: Nigmatullin, Ignashevich, Cherevchenko (red card) 90+3', Sennikov, Lekgetho, Obradović, Maminov, Loskov (c), Izmailov, Pimenov (Sarkisyan, 84), Obiorah.

- December 4, 2001 / FC Lokomotiv Moscow – Hapoel Tel Aviv 0–1 (Osterc 48') / Saturn Stadium, Ramenskoye / Attendance: 12,000

Lokomotiv: Nigmatullin, Nizhegorodov, Ignashevich, Sennikov, Sarkisyan (Obiorah, 61), Vučićević, Maminov, Izmailov, Loskov (c), Pimenov, Buznikin.
Hapoel Tel Aviv: Elimelech, Bakhar, Gershon (c), Domb, Antebi, Pisont (Luz, 79), Halmai, Onyshchenko, Tuama (Hilel, 90+2), Cleşcenco (Balili, 74), Osterc.

== UEFA Champions League 2002–03 ==
Manager: Yuri Semin.

=== Third qualifying round ===
- August 14, 2002 / (Austria) Grazer AK - FC Lokomotiv Moscow 0–2 (Lekgetho 6' Loskov 42') / Arnold Schwarzenegger Stadium, Graz / Attendance: 6,000

GAK: Schranz (Almer, 46), Pötscher, Tokić, Ramusch, Milinković, Amerhauser (Halmosi, 70), Hartmann, Aufhauser, Bazina, Brunmayr (c), Kollmann (Naumoski, 76).
Lokomotiv: Ovchinnikov, Nizhegorodov, Ignashevich, Pashinin, Drozdov, Evseev (Sennikov, 55), Lekgetho, Maminov, Loskov (c), Pimenov (Júlio César, 80), Buznikin (Vučićević, 75).

- August 28, 2002 / FC Lokomotiv Moscow – Grazer AK 3–3 (Ignashevich 6' Evseev 32' Júlio César 45' - Naumoski 37' Bazina 47' Aufhauser 63') / Lokomotiv Stadium, Moscow / Attendance: 14,000

Lokomotiv: Ovchinnikov, Evseev, Nizhegorodov, Ignashevich, Pashinin, Lekgetho, Maminov, Loskov (c) (Vučićević, 46; Drozdov, 65), Sirkhayev, Júlio César, Buznikin.
GAK: Almer, Ehmann, Tokić, Hartmann (Halmosi, 51), Ramusch, Čeh, Aufhauser, Bazina, Dmitrović, Naumoski, Brunmayr (c).

=== Group stage ===
- September 18, 2002 / FC Lokomotiv Moscow – (Turkey) Galatasaray 0–2 (Sarr 72' Arif 81') / Lokomotiv Stadium, Moscow / Attendance: 20,000

Lokomotiv Moscow: Ovchinnikov, Evseev, Nizhegorodov, Ignashevich, Pashinin (Sennikov, 60), Lekgetho, Drozdov, Maminov, Loskov (c), Júlio César (Baba Adamu, 74), Buznikin (Pimenov, 46).
Galatasaray: Mondragón, Ümit Davala, Almaguer, Bülent (c), Hakan, Batista, Ayhan (Fábio Pinto, 46), Ergün, Felipe, Hasan (Sarr, 70), Arif (Emre, 84).

- September 24, 2002 / (Belgium) Club Brugge - FC Lokomotiv Moscow 0–0 / Jan Breydel Stadium, Bruges / Attendance: 28,000

Brugge: Verlinden (c), De Cock, Simons, Van Der Heyden, Špilár (Clement, 61), Verheyen, Englebert, Serebrennikov, Mendoza (Stoica, 66), Lange, Maertens.
Lokomotiv: Ovchinnikov, Nizhegorodov, Ignashevich, Sennikov, Lekgetho, Evseev, Maminov (Obradović, 46), Loskov (c) (yellow card) 76' (yellow-red card) 84', Pimenov, Buznikin (Sirkhayev, 46), Júlio César (Obiorah, 75).

- October 1, 2002 / FC Lokomotiv Moscow – (Spain) Barcelona 1–3 (Obiorah 56' - Kluivert 28' Saviola 32' 49') / Lokomotiv Stadium, Moscow / Attendance: 20,000

Lokomotiv: Ovchinnikov (c), Sennikov, Ignashevich, Nizhegorodov, Obradović, Evseev, Drozdov, Maminov, Lekgetho, Obiorah (Buznikin, 66), Pimenov.
Barcelona: Valdés, Puyol, de Boer, Navarro, Mendieta, Xavi, Cocu, Motta, Saviola (Rochemback, 86), Luis Enrique (c) (Geovanni, 61), Kluivert (Gerard, 74).

- October 23, 2002 / Barcelona – FC Lokomotiv Moscow 1–0 (de Boer 76') / Camp Nou, Barcelona / Attendance: 30,000

Barcelona: Bonano, Navarro, de Boer, Puyol, Xavi, Cocu (c), Gabri, Mendieta (Rochemback, 66), Riquelme, Saviola, Kluivert.
Lokomotiv: Ovchinnikov, Ignashevich, Pashinin, Sennikov, Maminov, Evseev, Obradović, Loskov (c), Pimenov, Obiorah, Júlio César (Buznikin, 84).

- October 29, 2002 / Galatasaray - FC Lokomotiv Moscow 1–2 (Hasan 73' – Loskov 70' Evseev 75') / Ali Sami Yen Stadium, Istanbul / Attendance: 20,000

Galatasaray: Mondragón, Hakan, Bülent (c), Emre, Ümit Davala, Cihan (Felipe, 71), Fábio Pinto, Ergün, Baljić (Hasan, 46), Arif (Batista, 46), Christian.
Lokomotiv: Ovchinnikov, Ignashevich, Nizhegorodov, Pashinin, Sennikov, Maminov, Evseev, Lekgetho, Loskov (c), Pimenov, Obiorah (Júlio César, 78).

- November 13, 2002 / FC Lokomotiv Moscow - Club Brugge 2–0 (Júlio César 44' Loskov 90+2') / Lokomotiv Stadium, Moscow / Attendance: 19,000

Lokomotiv: Ovchinnikov, Nizhegorodov, Pashinin, Sennikov, Evseev, Ignashevich, Maminov, Loskov (c), Lekgetho, Júlio César (Baba Adamu, 90+1), Buznikin (Obiorah, 66).
Brugge: Verlinden (c), De Cock, Maertens, Clement, Van Der Heyden, Englebert, Simons, Stoica (Čeh, 84), Martens, Verheyen, Mendoza (Lešnjak, 73).

=== Second group stage ===
- November 26, 2002 / FC Lokomotiv Moscow – (Germany) Borussia Dortmund 1–2 (Ignashevich 31' – Frings 33' Koller 43') / Lokomotiv Stadium, Moscow / Attendance: 22,000

Lokomotiv: Ovchinnikov, Nizhegorodov, Pashinin, Sennikov, Evseev, Ignashevich, Maminov (Obradović, 46), Loskov (c), Lekgetho, Obiorah (Buznikin, 65), Pimenov (Baba Adamu, 74).
Borussia Dortmund: Lehmann, Wörns, Reuter (c), Metzelder, Heinrich, Frings, Kehl (Madouni, 89), Rosický (Reina, 90+1), Dedê, Koller, Ewerthon (Ricken, 83).

- December 11, 2002 / (Spain) Real Madrid – FC Lokomotiv Moscow 2–2 (Raúl 21' 76' – Obiorah 47' Mnguni 74') / Santiago Bernabéu Stadium, Madrid / Attendance: 52,000

Real Madrid: Casillas, Salgado, Roberto Carlos, Hierro (c), Zidane, Raúl, Figo, Ronaldo (Guti, 46), Cambiasso (Morientes, 77), Pavón, Makélélé (Conceição, 32).
Lokomotiv: Ovchinnikov, Nizhegorodov, Lekgetho, Ignashevich, Maminov, Loskov (c), Júlio César (Obiorah, 46), Pashinin, Evseev, Mnguni, Pimenov (Drozdov, 81).

- February 19, 2003 / (Italy) Milan – FC Lokomotiv Moscow 1–0 (Tomasson 62') / San Siro, Milan / Attendance: 72,028

Milan: Dida, Maldini (c), Nesta, Costacurta, Gattuso, Pirlo, Brocchi (Šimić, 79), Costa (Serginho, 63), Rivaldo, Inzaghi, Tomasson (Seedorf, 68).
Lokomotiv: Ovchinnikov, Nizhegorodov, Pashinin, Sennikov, Lekgetho, Obradović, Ignashevich (Parks, 83), Maminov, Loskov (c), Buznikin (Izmailov, 46), Pimenov.

- February 25, 2003 / FC Lokomotiv Moscow - Milan 0–1 (Rivaldo 34' (pen.)) / Lokomotiv Stadium, Moscow / Attendance: 30,000

Lokomotiv: Ovchinnikov, Nizhegorodov, Ignashevich, Sirkhayev (Pimenov, 58), Izmailov, Maminov, Loskov (c), Júlio César (Parks, 82), Evseev, Sennikov, Mnguni.
Milan: Dida, Maldini (c), Kaladze, Redondo (Brocchi, 76), Gattuso, Inzaghi (Tomasson, 84), Rivaldo, Nesta, Costacurta, Seedorf, Serginho (Costa, 86).

- March 12, 2003 / Borussia Dortmund – FC Lokomotiv Moscow 3–0 (Frings 39' Koller 58' Amoroso 66') / Westfalenstadion, Dortmund / Attendance: 48,000

Borussia Dortmund: Lehmann, Evanílson, Reuter (c), Wörns, Metzelder, Frings, Kehl, Dedê (Madouni, 20), Koller (Ricken, 70), Ewerthon, Amoroso.
Lokomotiv: Ovchinnikov (c), Lekgetho, Ignashevich, Pashinin, Evseev, Sennikov, Mnguni, Izmailov, Maminov, Obradović (Júlio César, 46), Pimenov.

- March 18, 2003 / FC Lokomotiv Moscow - Real Madrid 0–1 (Ronaldo 35') / Lokomotiv Stadium, Moscow / Attendance: 26,000

Lokomotiv: Ovchinnikov, Nizhegorodov, Ignashevich, Izmailov, Maminov (Sirkhayev, 81), Loskov (c), Pashinin, Evseev, Sennikov, Mnguni (Júlio César, 72), Pimenov.
Real Madrid: Casillas, Salgado, Zidane (Cambiasso, 90), Helguera, Raúl (c), Figo, Ronaldo (Guti, 81), Conceição, Solari, Pavón, Makélélé.

== UEFA Champions League 2003–04 ==
Manager: Yuri Semin.

=== Third qualifying round ===
- August 13, 2003 / (Ukraine) Shakhtar Donetsk – FC Lokomotiv Moscow 1–0 (Vukić 55' (pen.)) / Shakhtar Stadium, Donetsk / Attendance: 31,000

Shakhtar Donetsk: Pletikosa, Tymoshchuk (c), Popov, Bakharev (Srna, 81), Vukić, Vorobey, Lewandowski, Gai, Byelik (Aghahowa, 61), Pažin, Raţ.
Lokomotiv: Ovchinnikov, Nizhegorodov, Lekgetho, Ignashevich, Maminov, Loskov (c) (Buznikin, 67), Pashinin (yellow card) 55' (yellow-red card) 88', Parks, Sennikov, Khokhlov, Ashvetia (Izmailov, 41; Wagner, 74).

- August 27, 2003 / FC Lokomotiv Moscow – Shakhtar Donetsk 3–1 (Ashvetia 21' 45+2' Ignashevich 86' (pen.) - Lewandowski 71') / Lokomotiv Stadium, Moscow / Attendance: 29,000

Lokomotiv: Ovchinnikov, Nizhegorodov, Lekgetho, Ignashevich, Izmailov (Sennikov, 88), Maminov, Loskov (c), Buznikin (Leandro, 65), Evseev, Khokhlov, Ashvetia.
Shakhtar Donetsk: Pletikosa, Tymoshchuk (c), Popov (Byelik, 90+2), Bakharev, Vukić (Srna, 76), Vorobey, Lewandowski, Gai, Pažin, Brandão (Aghahowa, 69), Raţ.

=== Group stage ===
- September 17, 2003 / (Ukraine) Dynamo Kyiv – FC Lokomotiv Moscow 2–0 (Rincón 83' 90+1') / Olimpiysky National Sports Complex, Kyiv / Attendance: 78,000

Dynamo Kyiv: Shovkovskyi, Dmytrulin (Khatskevich, 46), Gavrančić, Fedorov, Nesmachniy, Husyev (Rincón, 62), Ghioane (Cernat, 79), Leko, Byalkevich (c), Peev, Shatskikh.
Lokomotiv: Ovchinnikov, Sennikov, Nizhegorodov, Pashinin, Ignashevich, Lekgetho, Maminov, Izmailov (Leandro, 87), Loskov (c), Khokhlov, Ashvetia (Pimenov, 88).

- September 30, 2003 / FC Lokomotiv Moscow - (England) Arsenal 0–0 / Lokomotiv Stadium, Moscow / Attendance: 30,000

Lokomotiv: Ovchinnikov, Evseev (Nizhegorodov, 72), Ignashevich, Pashinin, Sennikov, Gurenko, Izmailov, Maminov, Loskov (c), Khokhlov, Ashvetia (Pimenov, 65).
Arsenal: Lehmann, Cole, Keown (c), Pires, Wiltord, Lauren, Henry, Parlour, Edu, Gilberto, Touré.

- October 21, 2003 / FC Lokomotiv Moscow – (Italy) Internazionale 3–0 (Loskov 2' Ashvetia 50' Khokhlov 57') / Lokomotiv Stadium, Moscow / Attendance: 26,000

Lokomotiv: Ovchinnikov, Evseev (Gurenko, 74), Sennikov, Ignashevich, Lekgetho, Izmailov, Maminov, Loskov (c), Khokhlov, Buznikin (Pashinin, 46), Ashvetia.
Internazionale: Toldo, Córdoba, J. Zanetti (c), C. Zanetti, Cruz (Martins, 60), Cannavaro, Recoba, Materazzi (Emre, 60), Almeyda, Bréchet (Coco, 71), Vieri.

- November 5, 2003 / Internazionale - FC Lokomotiv Moscow 1–1 (Recoba 14' – Loskov 54') / San Siro, Milan / Attendance: 35,000

Internazionale: Toldo, Helveg, Materazzi, J. Zanetti (c), Cannavaro, C. Zanetti (Lamouchi, 68), Adani, Almeyda, Kily González (Karagounis, 90), Recoba (Cruz, 76), Vieri.
Lokomotiv: Ovchinnikov, Evseev, Ignashevich, Pashinin, Sennikov, Lekgetho, Izmailov (Nizhegorodov, 90), Maminov, Loskov (c), Khokhlov, Ashvetia (Buznikin, 76).

- November 25, 2003 / FC Lokomotiv Moscow - Dynamo Kyiv 3–2 (Buznikin 28' Ignashevich 45+1' (pen.) Parks 89' – Byalkevich 37' Shatskikh 65') / Lokomotiv Stadium, Moscow / Attendance: 28,000

Lokomotiv: Ovchinnikov (c), Evseev, Ignashevich, Pashinin, Sennikov, Lekgetho, Maminov, Loskov, Khokhlov, Buznikin (Parks, 83), Ashvetia (Nizhegorodov, 92).
Dynamo Kyiv: Shovkovskyi, Dmytrulin, Byalkevich (c), Rincón, Shatskikh, Ghioane (Khatskevich, 57), Husyev, Onyshchenko (Peev, 66), Nesmachniy, Gavrančić, Sablić.

- December 10, 2003 / Arsenal - FC Lokomotiv Moscow 2–0 (Pires 12' Ljungberg 67') / Highbury, London / Attendance: 35,343

Arsenal: Lehmann, Touré, Cygan, Campbell, Cole, Ljungberg, Gilberto, Vieira (c), Pires, Bergkamp (Kanu, 75), Henry.
Lokomotiv: Ovchinnikov, Evseev, Ignashevich, Pashinin, Sennikov, Lekgetho (yellow card) 8' (yellow-red card) 45', Maminov, Khokhlov, Loskov (c), Buznikin (Gurenko, 46), Ashvetia (Parks, 46).

=== First knockout round ===
- February 24, 2004 / FC Lokomotiv Moscow – (France) Monaco 2–1 (Izmailov 32' Maminov 59' – Morientes 69') / Lokomotiv Stadium, Moscow / Attendance: 26,000

Lokomotiv: Ovchinnikov, Evseev, Pashinin, Asatiani, Sennikov, Gurenko, Izmailov (Parks, 79), Loskov (c), Maminov, Khokhlov (Nizhegorodov, 83), Ashvetia (Obiorah, 46).
Monaco: Roma, Ibarra, Rodriguez (c), Givet, Evra, Cissé, Bernardi, Zikos, Rothen, Pršo (Adebayor, 64), Morientes.

- March 10, 2004 / Monaco - FC Lokomotiv Moscow 1–0 (Pršo 60') / Stade Louis II, Monaco / Attendance: 18,000

Monaco: Roma, Ibarra, Rodriguez (c), Givet, Evra, Pršo (Plašil, 90), Bernardi, Zikos, Rothen, Adebayor (Cissé, 77), Morientes.
Lokomotiv: Ovchinnikov, Evseev, Nizhegorodov, Asatiani, Pashinin, Sennikov (Gurenko, 65), Izmailov, Maminov, Loskov (c (yellow card) 19' (yellow-red card) 22'), Obiorah, Ashvetia (Parks, 67).

== UEFA Champions League 2005–06 ==
Manager: Vladimir Eshtrekov.

=== Second qualifying round ===
- July 27, 2005 / Rabotnički (North Macedonia) - FC Lokomotiv Moscow 1–1 (Nuhiji 12' – Sychev 90') / Gradski Stadion, Skopje / Attendance: 6,000

Rabotnički: Madzovski, Ig. Stojanov (c) (Mihajlović, 72), Karčev, Kralevski, Jovanovski, Trajčev, P. Stojanov, S. Ignatov (Yankep, 90+2), Nuhiji, Maznov (Ilijoski, 75), Pejčić.
Lokomotiv: Ovchinnikov (c), Evseev, Sennikov, Asatiani, Gurenko, Khokhlov (Samedov, 61), Lima, Maminov, Bilyaletdinov, Kanyenda (Lebedenko, 75), Sychev.

- August 3, 2005 / FC Lokomotiv Moscow - Rabotnički 2–0 (Sychev 75' Asatiani 85') / Lokomotiv Stadium, Moscow / Attendance: 19,648

Lokomotiv: Ovchinnikov (c), Evseev, Pashinin, Asatiani, Gurenko, Samedov (Maminov, 72), Bikey, Lima (Sennikov, 82), Khokhlov, Bilyaletdinov (Lebedenko, 89), Sychev.
Rabotnički: Madzovski, Karčev, Kralevski, Ig. Stojanov (c) (Il. Stojanov, 14), Jovanovski, P. Stojanov, Trajčev, S. Ignatov (Yankep, 55), Nuhiji (Ilijoski, 77), Maznov, Pejčić.

=== Third qualifying round ===
- August 10, 2005 / Rapid Wien (Austria) – FC Lokomotiv Moscow 1–1 (Valachovič 75' (pen.) – Samedov 10') / Gerhard Hanappi Stadium, Vienna / Attendance: 18,000

Rapid Wien: Payer, Korsós (Dober, 87), Valachovič, Bejbl, Adamski (Dollinger, 78), Hofmann (c), Hlinka, Martínez, Ivanschitz, Akagündüz, Kincl.
Lokomotiv: Ovchinnikov (c), Gurenko, Asatiani, Bikey (yellow card) 64' (yellow-red card) 74', Sennikov, Samedov (Pashinin, 76), Maminov, Lima, Khokhlov (Evseev, 90+3), Bilyaletdinov, Lebedenko (Ruopolo, 80).

- August 23, 2005 / FC Lokomotiv Moscow – Rapid Wien 0–1 (Valachovič 84') / Lokomotiv Stadium, Moscow / Attendance: 28,000

Lokomotiv: Ovchinnikov (c), Gurenko (Ruopolo, 86), Pashinin, Asatiani, Sennikov, Samedov (Izmailov, 58), Maminov, Khokhlov, Bilyaletdinov, Evseev, Lebedenko.
Rapid Wien: Payer, Dober, Valachovič, Bejbl, Adamski, Hofmann (c), Korsós (Martínez, 75), Hlinka, Ivanschitz, Kincl, Akagündüz (Lawarée, 55).

== UEFA Cup 2005–06 ==
Manager: Vladimir Eshtrekov (first round and group stage), Slavoljub Muslin (round of 32).

=== First round ===
- September 15, 2005 / Brann (Norway) – FC Lokomotiv Moscow 1–2 (Winters 45' – Ruopolo 71' Lebedenko 77') / Brann Stadion, Bergen / Attendance: 5,000

Brann: Opdal, Sigurðsson, Scharner (Klock, 70), Soma, Hanstveit (c), Sanne (Helegbe, 51), Andresen, Miller, Huseklepp, Walde (Haugen, 75), Winters.
Lokomotiv: Ovchinnikov (c), Evseev (Sennikov, 31), Pashinin, Asatiani, Gurenko, Samedov, Maminov (Bikey, 46), Khokhlov (Lebedenko, 46), Bilyaletdinov, Izmailov, Ruopolo.

- September 29, 2005 / FC Lokomotiv Moscow – Brann 3–2 (Loskov 61' Asatiani 77' Bilyaletdinov 90+1' – Macallister 45+2' Miller 74') / Lokomotiv Stadium, Moscow / Attendance: 14,000

Lokomotiv: Ovchinnikov, Gurenko, Sennikov, Asatiani, Kruglov, Izmailov (Bikey, 69), Maminov (Khokhlov, 46), Loskov (c), Lima, Bilyaletdinov, Ruopolo (Lebedenko, 79).
Brann: Opdal (red card) 31', Sigurðsson, Scharner, Soma, Hanstveit (c), Knudsen (Thorbjørnsen, 32), Haugen, Miller, Sanne (Huseklepp, 76), Macallister (Walde, 84), Winters.

=== Group stage ===
- October 19, 2005 / FC Lokomotiv Moscow – Espanyol (Spain) 0–1 (Tamudo 54') / Lokomotiv Stadium, Moscow / Attendance: 13,718

Lokomotiv: Ovchinnikov (c), Bugayev (Ruopolo, 69), Pashinin, Sennikov, Gurenko, Izmailov, Bikey, Lima, Asatiani, Bilyaletdinov, Lebedenko.
Espanyol: Iraizoz, David García (Hurtado, 22), Lopo, Pochettino, de la Peña, Luis García (Coro, 72), Ito, Fredson (Eduardo Costa, 67), Zabaleta, Jarque, Tamudo (c).

- November 3, 2005 / Palermo (Italy) – FC Lokomotiv Moscow 0–0 / Stadio Renzo Barbera, Palermo / Attendance: 15,823

Palermo: Andújar, Grosso, Barzagli, Ferri, Terlizzi, Masiello, González (Santana, 67), Codrea, Mutarelli (c) (Barone, 46), Pepe, Caracciolo (Makinwa, 44).
Lokomotiv: Ovchinnikov (c), Evseev, Bikey (Gurenko, 77), Asatiani, Sennikov, Lima, Maminov, Khokhlov (red card) 80', Izmailov, Bilyaletdinov, Ruopolo (Lebedenko, 90).

- November 23, 2005 / FC Lokomotiv Moscow – Brøndby (Denmark) 4–2 (Loskov 60' 64' 84' Lebedenko 63' – Retov 12' Skoubo 28') / Lokomotiv Stadium, Moscow / Attendance: 8,500

Lokomotiv: Ovchinnikov, Evseev, Bikey, Pashinin, Sennikov, Samedov (Ruopolo, 33), Gurenko, Asatiani, Loskov (c), Bilyaletdinov, Lebedenko (Bugayev, 90+1).
Brøndby: Ankergren, Rytter, Johansen, Nielsen (c), Sennels, Lorentzen (Christensen, 74), Daugaard, Lantz, Retov (Kamper, 46), T. Rasmussen (Absalonsen, 80), Skoubo.

- November 30, 2005 / Maccabi Petah Tikva (Israel) – FC Lokomotiv Moscow 0–4 (Loskov 27' Lebedenko 47' 48' Ruopolo 52') / Ramat Gan Stadium, Ramat Gan / Attendance: 3,500

Maccabi Petah Tikva: Cohen, Amar, Banai, Megamadov (c) (Hadiya, 59), Ganon, Caldeira, Tzemah, Edri (Tuama, 46), Mbamba, Golan, Dubrovin (David, 55).
Lokomotiv: Poliakov, Evseev, Bikey, Pashinin, Sennikov, Gurenko (Bugayev, 80), Asatiani (Amelyanchuk, 86), Loskov (c), Bilyaletdinov (Kruglov, 83), Lebedenko, Ruopolo.

=== Round of 32 ===
- February 15, 2006 / FC Lokomotiv Moscow – Sevilla (Spain) 0–1 (López 75') / Lokomotiv Stadium, Moscow / Attendance: 8,500

Lokomotiv: Poliakov, Gurenko, Asatiani, Pashinin, Spahić, Samedov, Kingston (Maminov, 60), Bikey, Loskov (c), Bilyaletdinov (Izmailov, 81), Parks (Lebedenko, 46).
Sevilla: Notario, Alves, Navarro (c), Dragutinović, David, Navas (Escudé, 86), Martí, López, Adriano (Puerta, 78), Kanouté, Fabiano (Saviola, 70).

- February 23, 2006 / Sevilla – FC Lokomotiv Moscow 2–0 (Maresca 33' Puerta 89') / Estadio Ramón Sánchez Pizjuán, Seville / Attendance: 20,000

Sevilla: Notario, Alves, Navarro (c) (Ocio, 82), Dragutinović, David, Navas, Maresca, López, Puerta, Fabiano (Kepa, 69), Saviola (Adriano, 46).
Lokomotiv: Poliakov, Spahić, Pashinin, Asatiani, Gurenko, Samedov (Parks, 68), Bikey, Maminov, Loskov (c), Bilyaletdinov (Izmailov, 60), Lebedenko.

== UEFA Cup 2006–07 ==
Manager: Slavoljub Muslin.

=== First round ===
- September 14, 2006 / FC Lokomotiv Moscow – Zulte Waregem (Belgium) 2–1 (Loskov 35' Ivanović 73' – Vandermarliere 90+4') / Lokomotiv Stadium, Moscow / Attendance: 11,023

Lokomotiv: Jakupović, Spahić (Evseev, 90+2), Asatiani, Ivanović, Fininho, Gurenko, Celsinho (O'Connor, 46), Loskov (c), Bilyaletdinov, Sychev, Traoré (Izmailov, 81).
Zulte Waregem: Merlier, Reina, De Brul, Leleu (c), Minne, Vandermarliere, Janssens (Van Steenbrugghe, 83), Verschuère, Sergeant, Matthys (Datti, 77), Mrđa (Vandendriessche, 65).

- September 28, 2006 / Zulte Waregem – FC Lokomotiv Moscow 2–0 (Matthys 57' Sergeant 82') / Jules Ottenstadion, Ghent / Attendance: 5,000

Zulte Waregem: De Vlieger, Minne (D'Haemers, 63), De Brul, Dindeleux, Reina, Matthys, Sergeant, Janssens, Verschuère, Meert, Datti (Mrđa, 59).
Lokomotiv: Poliakov, Evseev, Pashinin, Ivanović, Sennikov, Kingston (Izmailov, 46), Zouagi (Bilyaletdinov, 62), Gurenko, Loskov (c), O'Connor (Sychev, 62), Traoré.

== UEFA Cup 2007–08 ==
Manager: Anatoly Byshovets (first round and first two matches at group stage), Rinat Bilyaletdinov (last two matches at group stage).

=== First round ===
- September 20, 2007 / FC Midtjylland (Denmark) – FC Lokomotiv Moscow 1–3 (Babatunde 31' – Samedov 61' Bilyaletdinov 69' Sychev 90+1') / SAS Arena, Herning / Attendance: 6,000

Midtjylland: Raška, C. Poulsen, Klimpl, Troest, Afriyie, S. Poulsen, Oluwafemi, Thygesen, Madsen (c) (D. Olsen, 67), Kristensen (Dadu, 78), Babatunde (C. Olsen, 74).
Lokomotiv: Pelizzoli, Ivanović, Yefimov, Asatiani, Sennikov, Yanbayev (Samedov, 52), Maminov, Gurenko, Bilyaletdinov (c), Odemwingie, Sychev.

- October 4, 2007 / FC Lokomotiv Moscow – FC Midtjylland 2–0 (Bilyaletdinov 10' Maminov 15') / Lokomotiv Stadium, Moscow / Attendance: 9,600

Lokomotiv: Pelizzoli, Ivanović, Yefimov (Rodolfo, 41), Asatiani, Sennikov (Yanbayev, 46), Spahić, Maminov (Samedov, 58), Gurenko, Bilyaletdinov (c), Odemwingie, Sychev.
Midtjylland: Raška, C. Poulsen, Klimpl, Troest, Afriyie, S. Poulsen (Jessen, 57), Oluwafemi, Thygesen, D. Olsen, Dadu, Babatunde (Kristensen, 46).

=== Group B ===
- October 25, 2007 / FC Lokomotiv Moscow – Atlético Madrid (Spain) 3–3 (Bilyaletdinov 27' Odemwingie 60' 63' – Agüero 16' 85' Forlán 46') / Lokomotiv Stadium, Moscow / Attendance: 13,000

Lokomotiv: Pelizzoli, Ivanović, Yefimov (Yanbayev, 60), Rodolfo, Sennikov, Samedov (Cociş, 81), Gurenko (Maminov, 90+1), Spahić, Bilyaletdinov (c), Sychev, Odemwingie.
Atlético Madrid: Abbiati, López, Ibáñez, Fabiano Eller, Pernía, Jurado (Maniche, 75), Cléber Santana (Maxi Rodríguez, 69), Forlán, Raúl García, Simão (Luis García, 69), Agüero.

- November 8, 2007 / Aberdeen F.C. (Scotland) – FC Lokomotiv Moscow 1–1 (Diamond 28' – Ivanović 45+1') / Pittodrie Stadium, Aberdeen / Attendance: 18,843

Aberdeen: Langfield, Hart, Diamond, Considine, Foster, Clark (Maguire, 67), Nicholson, Severin, Aluko (de Visscher, 81), Young, Miller (Lovell, 86).
Lokomotiv: Pelizzoli, Ivanović, Asatiani, Rodolfo, Sennikov, Samedov (Cociş, 79), Spahić, Gurenko, Bilyaletdinov (c), Odemwingie, Sychev.

- November 29, 2007 / FC Lokomotiv Moscow – F.C. Copenhagen (Denmark) 0–1 (Nordstrand 62' (pen.)) / Lokomotiv Stadium, Moscow / Attendance: 11,000

Lokomotiv: Pelizzoli, Ivanović, Rodolfo, Asatiani, Spahić (yellow card) 29' (yellow-red card) 88', Gurenko, Maminov, Bilyaletdinov (c), Odemwingie (Samedov, 46), Sychev (Cociş, 85), Traoré.
Copenhagen: Christiansen, Antonsson, Gravgaard (c), Hangeland, Wendt, Kvist, Würtz (Sionko, 32), Nørregaard, Hutchinson, Nordstrand (Aílton, 79), Allbäck.

- December 5, 2007 / Panathinaikos F.C. (Greece) – FC Lokomotiv Moscow 2–0 (Salpingidis 70' 74') / Leoforos Alexandras Stadium, Athens / Attendance: 8,000

Panathinaikos: Galinović, Vyntra, Morris, Sarriegi, Fyssas, Romero (Ninis, 82), Tziolis, Mate Junior, Dimoutsos (Karagounis, 66), Papadopoulos, N'Doye (Salpingidis, 63).
Lokomotiv: Pelizzoli, Ivanović, Asatiani, Sennikov, Yanbayev, Samedov (A. Kuznetsov, 64), Gurenko, Maminov (Fomin, 82), Bilyaletdinov (c), Traoré (Korchagin, 86), Cociş.

== UEFA Europa League 2010–11 ==
Manager: Yuri Semin.

=== Play-off round ===
- August 19, 2010 / Lausanne (Switzerland) – FC Lokomotiv Moscow 1–1 (Y. Traoré 28' – Sychev 65') / Stade Olympique de la Pontaise, Lausanne / Attendance: 13,000

Lausanne: Favre, Y. Traoré, Buntschu, Meoli, Sonnerat, Carrupt (Stadelmann, 82), Celestini (c), Marazzi, Avanzini (Kilinc, 85), Silvio (Roux, 72), Munsy.
Lokomotiv: Guilherme, Shishkin, Rodolfo, Burlak, Yanbayev, Glushakov (Loskov, 67), Tarasov, Maicon (D. Traoré, 46), Aliyev, Torbinski (Gatagov, 70), Sychev (c).

- August 26, 2010 / FC Lokomotiv Moscow – Lausanne 1–1 (Aliyev 85' – Silvio 17'), pen. 3–4 (Aliyev (penalty scored) Sychev (penalty scored) Loskov (penalty scored) Shishkin (penalty missed) Maicon (penalty missed) – Silvio (penalty scored) Carrupt (penalty scored) Rodrigo (penalty scored) Katz (penalty missed) Celestini (penalty scored) ) / Lokomotiv Stadium, Moscow / Attendance: 11,053

Lokomotiv: Guilherme, Shishkin, Baša, Rodolfo (Loskov, 68), Yanbayev, Gatagov, Asatiani (Tarasov, 46), Torbinski (Maicon, 77), Aliyev, Sychev (c), D. Traoré.
Lausanne: Favre (Castejon, 90+3), Y. Traoré, Katz, Meoli, Sonnerat, Carrupt, Celestini (c), Marazzi, Avanzini (Kilinc, 78), Silvio, Munsy (Rodrigo, 51).

== UEFA Europa League 2011–12 ==
Manager: (Portugal) José Couceiro.

=== Play-off round ===
- August 18, 2011 / Lokomotiv Moscow – Spartak Trnava (Slovakia) 2–0 (Yanbayev 34' Maicon 37') / Lokomotiv Stadium, Moscow / Attendance: 12,402

Lokomotiv: Guilherme, Shishkin, da Costa, Ďurica, Yanbayev, Tarasov, Glushakov, Ignatyev (Obinna, 69), Ibričić (Zapater, 65), Maicon, Sychev (c) (Caicedo, 81).
Spartak Trnava: Raška (c), Koubský, Procházka, L.Hanzel, Diallo, Gross, Karhan, Bicák (Ciprys, 90), Kaščák, Vyskočil (Malcharek, 54), Oravec (Bernáth, 72)

- August 25, 2011 / Spartak Trnava (Slovakia) – Lokomotiv Moscow 1–1 (Yanbayev 38' (o.g.) – Obinna 80' (pen.)) / Štadión Antona Malatinského, Trnava / Attendance: 14,000

Spartak Trnava: Raška (c) (red card) 76', Čvirik, Koubský, L.Hanzel, P.Čarnota (red card) 90+4', Karhan, Bicák (Koné, 72), Kaščák, Vyskočil (Malcharek, 61 (red card) 90+1'), Tomaček, Oravec (Slovenčiak, 78)
Lokomotiv: Guilherme, Shishkin, da Costa, Ďurica, Yanbayev, Tarasov (Ibričić, 86), Glushakov, Obinna (Ignatyev, 89), Loskov (c) (Ozdoyev, 61), Maicon, Sychev.

=== Group L ===
- September 15, 2011 / SK Sturm Graz (Austria) – FC Lokomotiv Moscow 1–2 (Szabics 14' – Obinna 28' Sychev 29') / Stadion Graz-Liebenau, Graz / Attendance: 13,356

Sturm Graz: Čavlina, Popkhadze, Feldhofer (Pürcher, 46), Weber (c), Hölzl (Kainz, 21), Muratović (Haas, 66), Szabics, Burgstaller, Standfest, Bodul, Wolf.
Lokomotiv: Guilherme, Shishkin, Burlak, Ďurica, Yanbayev, Ozdoyev, Glushakov, Ibričić (Zapater, 46), Obinna (Ignatyev, 69), Sychev (c) (Caicedo, 76), Maicon.

- September 29, 2011 / FC Lokomotiv Moscow – R.S.C. Anderlecht (Belgium) 0–2 (Suárez 11' Mbokani 71') / Lokomotiv Stadium, Moscow / Attendance: 11,495

Lokomotiv: Guilherme, Shishkin, da Costa, Burlak, Yanbayev (Ignatyev, 78), Zapater, Ozdoyev (Loskov, 40), Glushakov, Obinna, Sychev (c) (Caicedo, 78), Maicon.
Anderlecht: Proto, Biglia (c), Suárez (Mareček, 74), Kanu (Odoi, 90), Kouyaté, Kljestan, Safari, Juhász, Wasilewski, Gillet, Canesin (Mbokani, 60).

- October 20, 2011 / FC Lokomotiv Moscow – AEK Athens F.C. (Greece) 3–1 (Sychev 47' 71' (pen.) Caicedo 90+3' – Sialmas 89') / Lokomotiv Stadium, Moscow / Attendance: 8,279

Lokomotiv: Guilherme, Shishkin, da Costa, Burlak, Yanbayev, Zapater, Glushakov, Ibričić (Caicedo, 66), Ignatyev (Loskov, 78), Sychev (c), Maicon (Obinna, 46).
AEK Athens: Arabatzis (c), Kontoes, Manolas, Cala, Beleck, José Carlos, Karabelas, Lagos (Sialmas, 73), Vargas (Kafes, 58), Burns (Leonardo, 65), Gentsoglou.

- November 3, 2011 / AEK Athens F.C. (Greece) – FC Lokomotiv Moscow 1–3 (Leonardo 60' (pen.) – Glushakov 50' Maicon 72' Ignatyev 80') / Olympic Stadium, Athens / Attendance: 3,000

AEK Athens: Arabatzis, Helgason (Kontoes, 46), Manolas, Beleck, José Carlos, Sialmas (Roger, 69), Makos, Lagos, Burns (Leonardo, 46), Georgeas (c), Gentsoglou.
Lokomotiv: Guilherme, Shishkin, Ilič, Burlak, Ďurica, Zapater, Glushakov (c), Ibričić (Sychev, 81), Ignatyev (Nurov, 81), Torbinski (Maicon, 61), Obinna.

- December 1, 2011 / FC Lokomotiv Moscow – SK Sturm Graz (Austria) 3–1 (Maicon 62' Sychev 72' (pen.)) Glushakov 89' – Kainz 63' / Lokomotiv Stadium, Moscow / Attendance: 12,426

Lokomotiv: Amelchenko, Shishkin, da Costa, Ďurica, Yanbayev, Zapater, Glushakov, Ibričić (Maicon, 57), Ignatyev, Torbinski (Ozdoyev, 77), Sychev (c) (Minchenkov, 86).
Sturm Graz: Čavlina, Popkhadze, Weber (c), Dudić, Neuhold, Ehrenreich, Standfest (Kainz, 38), Bodul (Haas, 66), Koch, Kienast, Klem (Weinberger, 77).

- December 14, 2011 / R.S.C. Anderlecht (Belgium) – FC Lokomotiv Moscow 5–3 (Kljestan 33' Canesin 39' Wasilewski 57' Suárez 61' Gillet 78' – Ignatyev 21' Sychev 69' (pen.) 89') / Constant Vanden Stock Stadium, Brussels / Attendance: 19,700

Anderlecht: Proto (c), Suárez (Mbokani, 73), Jovanović, Kouyaté, Mareček, Kljestan, Safari, Juhász, Wasilewski, Gillet (Badibanga, 81), Canesin (De Sutter, 88).
Lokomotiv: Amelchenko, Ilič, da Costa, Ďurica, A.Ivanov (yellow card) 45+2' (yellow-red card) 83', Zapater, Glushakov, Torbinski (c) (Ozdoyev, 46), Ignatyev, Minchenkov (Sychev, 46), Maicon (Caicedo, 55).

=== Round of 32 ===
- February 16, 2012 / FC Lokomotiv Moscow – Athletic Bilbao (Spain) 2–1 (Glushakov 61' (pen.) Caicedo 71' – Muniain 35') / Lokomotiv Stadium, Moscow / Attendance: 13,160

Lokomotiv: Guilherme, Shishkin, Burlak, Belyayev, Yanbayev, Zapater, Tarasov, Glushakov (Ozdoyev, 88), Maicon (Sychev, 89), Caicedo, Torbinski (c) (Obinna, 66).
Athletic Bilbao: Iraizoz, Iraola (c), Javi Martínez, Amorebieta, Aurtenetxe (D.López, 79), Iturraspe, Herrera, Susaeta, de Marcos, Muniain, Llorente.

- February 23, 2012 / Athletic Bilbao (Spain) – FC Lokomotiv Moscow 1–0 (Muniain 62') / San Mamés Stadium, Bilbao / Attendance: 35,000

Athletic Bilbao: Iraizoz, Iraola (c), Javi Martínez, Amorebieta (yellow card) 54' (yellow-red card) 60', de Marcos, Iturraspe (I.Pérez, 46), Herrera (Ekiza, 68), Susaeta (San José, 46), Toquero, Muniain, Llorente.
Lokomotiv: Guilherme, Shishkin, Burlak, Belyayev (da Costa, 80), Yanbayev, Zapater, Tarasov, Ozdoyev (Sychev, 66), Glushakov, Caicedo, Torbinski (c) (Obinna, 66).

== UEFA Europa League 2014–15 ==
Manager: (Belarus) Leonid Kuchuk.

=== Play-off round ===
- August 21, 2014 / Apollon Limassol (Cyprus) – Lokomotiv Moscow 1–1 (Guie Guie 80' – Kasaev 39') / GSP Stadium, Nicosia / Attendance: 9,300

Apollon Limassol: Vale, Stylianou (Mulder, 70), Merkis (c), João Paulo, Vasiliou (Thuram, 79), Hamdani, Gullón, Papoulis, Meriem (Rezek, 69), Robert, Guie Guie.
Lokomotiv: Guilherme (c), Shishkin, Ćorluka, Ďurica, Denisov (yellow card) 63' (yellow-red card) 87', Tsiharaw (red card) 75', Tarasov (Mykhalyk, 65), Samedov, Fernandes, Kasaev (Maicon, 62), Niasse (N'Doye, 46).

- August 28, 2014 / Lokomotiv Moscow – Apollon Limassol (Cyprus) 1–4 (Pavlyuchenko 85' – Rezek 20' Papoulis 51' Thuram 78' Hugo López 83') / Lokomotiv Stadium, Moscow / Attendance: 6,520

Lokomotiv: Guilherme (c), Shishkin, Ćorluka, Ďurica, Seraskhov, Pejčinović, Tarasov, Kasaev (Samedov, 67), Fernandes (Al. Miranchuk, 53), Maicon, Niasse (Pavlyuchenko, 53).
Apollon Limassol: Vale, Stylianou, Merkis (c), João Paulo, Robert, Hamdani, Gullón (Charalambous, 87), Papoulis (Hugo López, 81), Meriem (Thuram, 64), Sangoy, Rezek.

== UEFA Europa League 2015–16 ==
Manager: (Tajikistan) Igor Cherevchenko.

=== Group H ===
- September 17, 2015 / Sporting CP (Portugal) – FC Lokomotiv Moscow 1–3 (Montero 50' – Samedov 12' 56' Niasse 65') / Jose Alvalade, Lisbon / Attendance: 25,400

Sporting: Rui Patrício, João Pereira, Paulo Oliveira, Tobias Figueiredo, Jefferson Nascimento, Aquilani (André Martins, 71), T.Gutiérrez, Carlos Mané (Ruiz, 63), Adrien Silva (c), Gelson Martins, Montero (Slimani, 63).
Lokomotiv: Guilherme, Shishkin, Ćorluka (c), Pejčinović, Denisov, N'Dinga, Tarasov (Mykhalyk, 86), Samedov, M.Fernandes (Kolomeytsev, 81), Maicon (Grigoryev, 82), Niasse.

- October 1, 2015 / FC Lokomotiv Moscow – KF Skënderbeu (Albania) 2–0 (Niasse 35' Samedov 73') / Lokomotiv Stadium, Moscow / Attendance: 10,340

Lokomotiv: Guilherme, Yanbayev, Ćorluka (c), Pejčinović, Logashov, Tarasov, Samedov, Kolomeytsev (N'Dinga, 66), M.Fernandes (Al.Miranchuk, 46), Maicon, Niasse (Škuletić, 81).
Skënderbeu: Shehi (c), Vangjeli, Radas, Jashanica, Abazi (Arapi, 77), Lilaj, Nimaga, Latifi (Shkëmbi, 71), Olayinka (Progni, 87), B.Berisha, Salihi.

- October 22, 2015 / FC Lokomotiv Moscow – Beşiktaş J.K. (Turkey) 1–1 (Maicon 54' – Mario Gomez 64') / Lokomotiv Stadium, Moscow / Attendance: 19,124

Lokomotiv: Guilherme, Shishkin, Ćorluka (c) (red card) 69', Mykhalyk, Denisov, Kolomeytsev, N'Dinga, Samedov, M.Fernandes (Ďurica, 73), Maicon (Kasaev, 80), Niasse (Grigoryev, 88).
Beşiktaş: Zengin (c), Beck, Rhodolfo, Gülüm, Köybaşı, Hutchinson, Özyakup, Töre (Tosun, 65), J.Sosa (Uysal, 57), Quaresma (K.Frei, 87), M.Gómez.

- November 5, 2015 / Beşiktaş J.K. (Turkey) – FC Lokomotiv Moscow 1–1 (Quaresma 58' – Niasse 76') / Atatürk Stadium, Istanbul / Attendance: 24,690

Beşiktaş: Zengin (c), Beck, Rhodolfo, Gülüm, Köybaşı, Hutchinson, Özyakup (Tosun, 83), Töre, J.Sosa (Uysal, 72), Şahan (Quaresma, 46), M.Gómez.
Lokomotiv: Guilherme, Yanbayev, Shishkin, Ďurica, Denisov, N'Dinga, Kolomeytsev, Samedov (c), M.Fernandes (Al.Miranchuk, 74), Maicon (Grigoryev, 90), Niasse (Škuletić, 90).

- November 26, 2015 / FC Lokomotiv Moscow – Sporting CP (Portugal) 2–4 (Maicon 5' Al.Miranchuk 86' – Montero 20' Ruiz 38' Gelson Martins 43' Matheus Pereira 60') / Lokomotiv Stadium, Moscow / Attendance: 11,043

Lokomotiv: Guilherme, Shishkin, Mykhalyk, Ďurica, Denisov, N'Dinga, Tarasov (Kolomeytsev, 64), Samedov (c), M.Fernandes (Al.Miranchuk, 78), Maicon (Kasaev, 81), Niasse.
Sporting: Boeck, Esgaio, Naldo, Ewerton, J.Silva, Adrien Silva (c), Gelson Martins, João Mário (Aquilani, 79), Matheus Pereira (André Martins, 67), Montero (Slimani, 71), Ruiz.

- December 10, 2015 / KF Skënderbeu (Albania) – FC Lokomotiv Moscow 0–3 (Tarasov 18' Niasse 88' Samedov 90') / Elbasan Arena, Elbasan / Attendance: 1,152

Skënderbeu: Shehi (c), Ademir, Radas, Jashanica, Abazi, Lilaj, Esquerdinha (Djair, 82), Latifi (Progni, 72), Olayinka, B.Berisha, Salihi.
Lokomotiv: Guilherme, Shishkin, Mykhalyk (Ďurica, 82), Pejčinović, Denisov, N'Dinga, Tarasov, Samedov (c), Kolomeytsev, Kasaev (Maicon, 75), Niasse (Al.Miranchuk, 90).

=== Round of 32 ===
- February 16, 2016 / Fenerbahçe S.K. (Turkey) – FC Lokomotiv Moscow 2–0 (Souza 18' 72') / Şükrü Saracoğlu Stadium, Istanbul / Attendance: 36,195

Fenerbahce: Fabiano, Gönül (c), Kjær, Bruno Alves, Erkin, Tufan, Topal, Souza (Kadlec, 84), Nani, van Persie (Fernandão, 77), Şen (Potuk, 78).
Lokomotiv: Guilherme, Yanbayev, Pejčinović, Ďurica, Denisov, N'Dinga, Tarasov, Samedov (c), M.Fernandes, Kasaev (Maicon, 62; Mykhalyk, 75), Škuletić (Al.Miranchuk, 79).

- February 25, 2016 / FC Lokomotiv Moscow – Fenerbahçe S.K. (Turkey) 1–1 (Samedov 45' – Topal 83') / Lokomotiv Stadium, Moscow / Attendance: 12,695

Lokomotiv: Guilherme, Pejčinović, Ćorluka (c), Ďurica, Denisov, Kolomeytsev, N'Dinga (Mykhalyk, 13), Samedov, M.Fernandes (Škuletić, 73), Kasaev (Zhemaletdinov, 81), Al.Miranchuk.
Fenerbahce: Fabiano, Gönül (c) (Özbayraklı, 44), Kjær, Bruno Alves, Kaldırım, Tufan (Kadlec, 74), Topal, Souza, Nani (Potuk, 79), van Persie, Şen.

== UEFA Europa League 2017–18 ==
Manager: (Russia) Yuri Semin.

=== Group F ===
- September 14, 2017 / F.C. Copenhagen (Denmark) – FC Lokomotiv Moscow 0–0 / Parken Stadium, Copenhagen / Attendance: 17,285

Copenhagen: Robin Olsen, Benjamin Verbič, Zeca (William Kvist, 86), Andrija Pavlovic, Jan Gregus, Kasper Kusk (Rasmus Falk, 62), Denis Vavro, Nicolai Boilesen(c), Peter Ankersen, Michael Luftner, Pieros Sotiriou.
Lokomotiv: Guilherme, Fernandes, Pejčinović, Farfan (Eder, 71), Ignatyev, Tarasov, Mykhalyk, Denisov (c), Rybus, Kverkvelia, Aleksei Miranchuk (Miranchuk, 82).

- September 28, 2017/ FC Lokomotiv Moscow – FC Fastav Zlin (Czech Republic) 3–0 (Fernandes (2 p) 6' 17') / RZD Arena, Moscow / Attendance: 10,065

Lokomotiv: Guilherme, Fernandes, Pejčinović, Farfan (Miranchuk, 46), Ignatyev (Rotenberg, 88), Tarasov, Eder, Denisov (c), Kverkvelia, Aleksei Miranchuk (Kolomeytsev, 78), Lysov.
Zlín: Dostál, Diop (Beauguel, 79), Jiráček (c), Traoré, Holzer, Matejov (Kopečný, 65), Gajić, Bačo, Ekpai, Železník (Mehanović, 46), Vukadinović

- October 19, 2017 / FC Sheriff Tiraspol (Moldova) 1–1 FC Lokomotiv Moscow
- November 2, 2017 / FC Lokomotiv Moscow 1–2 FC Sheriff Tiraspol (Moldova)
- November 23, 2017 / FC Lokomotiv Moscow 2–1 F.C. Copenhagen (Denmark)
- December 7, 2017 / FC Fastav Zlin (Czech Republic) 0–2 FC Lokomotiv Moscow
