= Yury Svirkov =

Belarusian footballer and coach

Personal information
- Full name: Yury Gennadyevich Svirkov
- Date of birth: 20 January 1968 (age 58)
- Place of birth: Bobruisk, Byelorussian SSR, Soviet Union
- Height: 1.84 m (6 ft 1/2 in)
- Position: Goalkeeper

Senior career*
Years	Team	Apps	(Gls)
1986–1987	Dnepr Mogilev	5	(0)
1990–1993	Neman Grodno	84	(0)
1994	Fandok Bobruisk	8	(0)
1995–1997	MPKC Mozyr	51	(0)
1998–1999	Torpedo-MAZ Minsk	32	(0)
2000	Khimik Svetlogorsk	5	(1)
Total		185	(1)

International career
1996	Belarus	1	(0)

Managerial career
- 2000–2002: Belshina Bobruisk (goalkeeping coach)
- 2003: Lokomotiv Minsk (goalkeeping coach)
- 2004–2005: Metalurh Zaporizhzhia (goalkeeping coach)
- 2006–2009: Spartak Nalchik (assistant)
- 2009: Mashuk-KMV Pyatigorsk
- 2009–2010: Zelenograd
- 2010: Terek Grozny (assistant)
- 2011: Trans Narva
- 2017: Anzhi-Yunior Zelenodolsk
- 2018: Veres Rivne
- 2019: Inkomsport Yalta
- * Club domestic league appearances and goals

Yury Svirkov (born 20 January 1968) is a Belarusian professional football coach and a former player.

== Personal life ==
He is an older brother of Andrey Svirkov, who is also former professional football goalkeeper. The brothers played alongside each other in a number of teams throughout their careers and also worked together in Spartak Nalchik, until Yury left the team in 2009.

== Honours ==
Neman Grodno

- Belarusian Cup winner: 1992–93

MPKC Mozyr

- Belarusian Premier League winner: 1996
- Belarusian Cup winner: 1995–96
