= Zoran Jovanovski =

Macedonian association football manager

Personal information
- Full name: Zoran Jovanovski; Зоран Јовановски
- Date of birth: 21 August 1972 (age 54)
- Place of birth: Skopje, SFR Yugoslavia
- Height: 1.88 m (6 ft 2 in)
- Position: Defender

Senior career*
Years	Team	Apps	(Gls)
1991–1997	Vardar	139	(1)
1997–1999	Helsingborg	39	(0)
1997–1998	→ České Budějovice (loan)	3	(0)
1999–2000	Bashkimi	5	(0)
2000–2002	Sloga Jugomagnat	51	(0)
2002–2003	Samsunspor	26	(0)
2003–2004	Sloga Jugomagnat	31	(0)
2004–2007	Rabotnički Skopje	75	(0)
2007–2008	Milano Kumanovo	29	(1)
2008–2009	Teteks	5	(0)
2009	Metalurg Skopje	3	(0)

International career
1993–2001	Macedonia	29	(0)
- * Club domestic league appearances and goals as of 17 July 2009

Zoran Jovanovski (born 21 August 1972 in Skopje) is a Macedonian retired football defender.

== International career ==
He made his senior debut for Macedonia in an October 1993 friendly match away against Slovenia, which was his country's first ever official match, and has earned a total of 29 caps, scoring no goals. His final international was an October 2001 FIFA World Cup qualification match against Slovakia.

== Personal life ==
He is a twin brother of Goran Jovanovski.
