= Martin Raška =

Czech footballer and coach

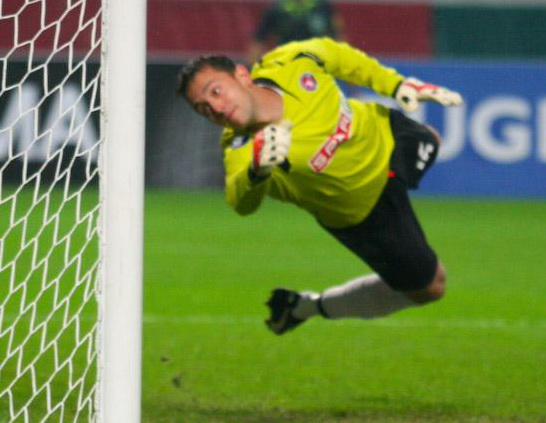

Personal information
- Full name: Martin Raška
- Date of birth: 31 January 1977 (age 49)
- Place of birth: Ostrava, Czechoslovakia
- Height: 1.90 m (6 ft 3 in)
- Position: Goalkeeper

Team information
- Current team: Kolding (gk coach)

Youth career
- Frýdek-Místek

Senior career*
Years	Team	Apps	(Gls)
1995–1997	Frýdek-Místek	40	(0)
1997–2006	Baník Ostrava	72	(0)
2000–2001	→ Spartak Trnava (loan)	29	(0)
2007–2010	Midtjylland	41	(0)
2010–2013	Spartak Trnava	60	(0)
2013–2016	Zemplín Michalovce	33	(0)
Total		275	(0)

International career
1998–1999	Czech Republic U21	3	(0)
1998	Czech Republic B	1	(0)

Managerial career
- 2016–2017: Zemplín Michalovce (gk coach)
- 2017–2020: DAC Dunajská Streda (gk coach)
- 2020-2021: Chennaiyin FC (gk coach)
- 2021–2022: DAC Dunajská Streda (gk coach)
- 2022–2024: DAC Dunajská Streda (U19 gk coach)
- 2024–: Kolding (gk coach)
- * Club domestic league appearances and goals as of 14 June 2016

Martin Raška (born 31 January 1977) is a Czech football goalkeeper who works as a goalkeeping coach at Danish 1st Division club Kolding IF.

== Honours ==
Baník Ostrava

- Gambrinus liga (1): 2003–04
- Czech Cup (1): 2004–05

Zemplín Michalovce

- 2. Liga (1): 2014–15
