= Goran Dasović =

Croatian footballer

Personal information
- Full name: Goran Dasović
- Date of birth: 31 August 1975 (age 51)
- Place of birth: Brčko, SFR Yugoslavia
- Height: 1.87 m (6 ft 2 in)
- Position: Forward

Youth career
- 199x–1996: Vojvodina

Senior career*
Years	Team	Apps	(Gls)
1996–1997	Varteks	4	(1)
1997–1998	Čakovec		
1998–2000	NK Zagreb	10	(0)
1999–2000	→ Olimpija Ljubljana (loan)	16	(1)
2001–2002	FC St. Veit		
2002	Fakel Voronezh	6	(0)
2007	SAK Klagenfurt		
2008	SVG Bleiburg	7	(2)
2008	HAŠK	12	(4)
2009	Maksimir	3	(8)
- * Club domestic league appearances and goals

Goran Dasović (born 31 August 1975) is a Croatian retired football player.

== Club career ==
Born in Brčko, SR Bosnia and Herzegovina, SFR Yugoslavia, he started his career playing in Serbia in the youth team of FK Vojvodina, and in 1996 moved to Croatia where he became senior and represented a number of clubs, namely NK Varteks, NK Čakovec and NK Zagreb before moving to Slovenia to join NK Olimpija Ljubljana. Leaving for Russia, he would go on to play four seasons with FC Fakel-Voronezh Voronezh. In 2005, he retired, but in 2007, he accepted an offer to come-back and signed with Austrian side SAK Klagenfurt. He would also play for another Austrian club, SVG Bleiburg, before returning to Croatia to play with NK HAŠK and NK Maksimir.

== External sources ==
- Playing career at NK Maksimir official site (in Croatian)
- Stats from HNL at 1hnl.net
- Stats from Slovenia at PrvaLiga
- Goran Dasović at FootballFacts.ru (in Russian)
