= Anthony Favre =

Swiss footballer (born 1984)

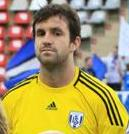

Personal information
- Date of birth: 1 February 1984 (age 42)
- Place of birth: Rolle, Switzerland
- Height: 1.93 m (6 ft 4 in)
- Position: Goalkeeper

Team information
- Current team: FC Le Mont

Youth career
- 1999–2000: FC Rolle

Senior career*
Years	Team	Apps	(Gls)
2001–2004	Servette II	10	(0)
2002–2003	Servette	1	(0)
2004–2006	Baulmes	47	(0)
2006–2013	Lausanne-Sport	184	(0)
2013–2014	Wil	33	(0)
2014–2017	FC Zürich	14	(0)
2017	→ FC Le Mont (loan)	15	(0)
- * Club domestic league appearances and goals as of 19 June 2017

Anthony Favre (born 1 February 1984) is a retired Swiss professional footballer. He last played for FC Le Mont.
