= Oleh Haras =

Ukrainian footballer and coach

Personal information
- Full name: Oleh Zinoviyovych Haras
- Date of birth: 5 December 1976 (age 49)
- Place of birth: Vistova, Ukrainian SSR
- Height: 1.77 m (5 ft 9 1/2 in)
- Position: Forward

Team information
- Current team: Karpaty Lviv U19 (assistant)

Youth career
- LGUFK Lviv

Senior career*
Years	Team	Apps	(Gls)
1992–1993	Karpaty Lviv	1	(0)
1993–1996	Lviv	95	(36)
1996–2000	Lokomotiv Moscow	30	(7)
2000–2001	Fakel Voronezh	27	(1)
2002–2003	Karpaty Lviv	4	(0)
2002	Karpaty-2 Lviv	2	(0)
2011	FC Karyer Torchynovychi	14	(7)
2012	Lviv	8	(1)
Total		181	(52)

International career
1993	Ukraine-17		
1994	Ukraine-18		
1995	Ukraine-19		
1996	Ukraine-21	2	(1)

Managerial career
- 2012: Lviv (assistant)
- 2016–: Karpaty Lviv U19 (assistant)
- * Club domestic league appearances and goals

Oleh Haras (Ukrainian: Олег Зіновійович Гарас; born 5 December 1976) is a Ukrainian professional football coach and a former player.

== Club career ==
He made his professional debut in the Ukrainian Premier League in 1992 for FC Karpaty Lviv.

== Coaching career ==
In February 2012 he was returned to football as playing assistant coach for FC Lviv in the Ukrainian First League.

== Honours ==
- Russian Premier League runner-up: 2000.
- Russian Premier League bronze: 1998.
- Russian Cup winner: 1997.
- Russian Cup finalist: 1998.
