= Nichlas Hindsberg =

Danish footballer (born 1975)

Personal information
- Full name: Nichlas Rask Hindsberg
- Date of birth: 7 May 1975 (age 51)
- Place of birth: Copenhagen, Denmark
- Height: 1.81 m (5 ft 11 in)
- Position: Midfielder

Senior career*
Years	Team	Apps	(Gls)
1995–1997	Viborg		
1997–2001	Lyngby		
2002–2003	Nordsjælland		
2004–2005	Hammarby		
2006	Lyngby		
- * Club domestic league appearances and goals

Nichlas Hindsberg (born 7 May 1975) is a Danish retired football midfielder.
