= Panče Stojanov =

Macedonian footballer

Personal information
- Full name: Panče Stojanov; Панче Стојанов
- Date of birth: 23 June 1975 (age 51)
- Place of birth: Strumica, SFR Yugoslavia
- Height: 1.74 m (5 ft 8 1/2 in)
- Position: Midfielder

Team information
- Current team: Brera Strumica (manager)

Senior career*
Years	Team	Apps	(Gls)
2000–2002	Sileks	47	(3)
2002–2003	Belasica	34	(4)
2003–2007	Rabotnički	94	(11)
2007–2009	Renova	48	(0)
2009–2011	Turnovo	66	(2)
2012	Belasica		

International career
2001–2002	Macedonia	12	(0)

Managerial career
- 2015–2018: Akademija Pandev
- 2025: Brera Strumica (assistant)
- 2025–: Brera Strumica
- * Club domestic league appearances and goals

Panče Stojanov (born 23 June 1975) is a Macedonian football coach and a former international player. He is the manager of Brera Strumica in the Macedonian First Football League.

== International career ==
He made his senior debut for Macedonia in an August 2001 friendly match against Saudi Arabia and has earned a total of 12 caps, scoring no goals. His final international was an August 2002 friendly against Malta.
