= Bennett Mnguni =

South African soccer player

Personal information
- Full name: Thabo Bennett Mnguni
- Date of birth: 18 March 1974 (age 52)
- Place of birth: Pretoria, South Africa
- Height: 1.81 m (5 ft 11 in)
- Position: Midfielder

Senior career*
Years	Team	Apps	(Gls)
1998–2002	Mamelodi Sundowns	76	(16)
2002–2003	Lokomotiv Moscow	8	(1)
2003–2005	Rostov	33	(2)
2005	Tianjin Teda	18	(3)
2006	Mamelodi Sundowns	2	(0)
2007	AmaZulu	4	(0)
2007–2008	Thanda Royal Zulu	21	(2)
2008–2009	Okktha United		

International career
2001–2004	South Africa	12	(0)
- * Club domestic league appearances and goals

Thabo Bennett Mnguni (born 18 March 1974) is a former South African international footballer who played as a midfielder.

== Career ==
Mnguni started his career at Mamelodi Sundowns, before joining Russian club Lokomotiv Moscow on a two-and-three-quarter-year contract February 2002. Mnguni left Lokomotiv after a year and joined fellow Russian side Rostov before moving to Tianjin Teda in China in 2005. Mnguni returned to South Africa in 2006 with Mamelodi Sundowns, moving to AmaZulu for the first half of 2007 and Thanda Royal Zulu for the 2007–08 season. Mnguni once again moved abroad in 2008, signing for Okktha United in Myanmar.

== International career ==
Mnguni represented South Africa twelve times between 2001 and 2004, most notably at the 2002 World Cup, and 2002 & 2004 African Cup of Nations.

== Career statistics ==
=== International ===
South Africa national team
Year	Apps	Goals
2001	5	0
2002	4	0
2003	0	0
2004	3	0
Total	12	0
