= Pablo Sanz (footballer, born 1973) =

Spanish footballer

Personal information
- Full name: Pablo Sanz Iniesta
- Date of birth: 30 August 1973 (age 53)
- Place of birth: Barcelona, Spain
- Height: 1.88 m (6 ft 2 in)
- Position: Midfielder

Team information
- Current team: Qatar (assistant)

Senior career*
Years	Team	Apps	(Gls)
1993–1994	Barcelona B	68	(11)
1994–1995	Gimnàstic	36	(1)
1995–1997	Barcelona B	56	(1)
1997–2004	Rayo Vallecano	168	(10)
2004–2005	Numancia	21	(1)
2005–2006	Sabadell	19	(2)

Managerial career
- 2014–2016: Porto (assistant)
- 2016–2018: Spain (assistant)
- 2018: Real Madrid (assistant)
- 2019–2022: Sevilla (assistant)
- 2022–2023: Wolverhampton Wanderers (assistant)
- 2024–2025: West Ham United (assistant)
- 2025–: Qatar (assistant)
- * Club domestic league appearances and goals

Pablo Sanz Iniesta (born 30 August 1973) is a Spanish former footballer who played as a midfielder, he is currently assistant head coach for Qatar national team.

== Playing career ==
Pablo Sanz was a Barcelona youth product and started his playing career at Barcelona B as midfielder. Due to a lack of playing time, he left for Gimnàstic after just one season. However, he returned to Barcelona B after another season, playing 56 matches and scoring one goal. After Barcelona, he joined Rayo Vallecano in 1997, playing for seven seasons before leaving in 2004, spending the majority of his career with them. He played 168 matches and scored 10 goals.

In 2004, he joined Numancia and played one season and played 21 games and scored 1 goal, before leaving in 2005. His career ended with Sabadell, as he joined them in 2005 and stayed for one year, but retired at the end of 2006.

== Coaching career ==
In 2016, he joined Spain as an assistant of Julen Lopetegui. In 2018, he left the team with Lopetegui, and joined him in Real Madrid as an assistant. In 2019, he was appointed as the assistant coach of Sevilla. In 2022, he joined Wolverhampton Wanderers as Lopetegui's assistant. Following Lopetegui’s appointment as head coach of WestHam United, Sanz joined the club as assistant head coach in May 2024.
