= Sead Halilagić =

Personal information
- Birth name: Sead Halilagić
- Date of birth: 4 February 1972 (age 54)
- Place of birth: Novi Pazar, SR Serbia, SFR Yugoslavia
- Height: 1.88 m (6 ft 2 in)
- Position: Defender

Youth career
- 1983–1988: Novi Pazar

Senior career*
Years	Team	Apps	(Gls)
1988–1992	Novi Pazar	20	(1)
1992	Željezničar		
1993–1997	Vojvodina		
1997–1999	İstanbulspor	64	(1)
1999–2001	Beşiktaş	38	(1)
2002	Slavia Sofia	11	(1)
2002–2003	Adanaspor	14	(1)

Managerial career
- 2006–2007: Novi Pazar
- * Club domestic league appearances and goals

Sead Halilagić (Serbian Cyrillic: Сеад Халилагић; born 4 February 1972) is a Serbian-Turkish former footballer of Bosniak descent, who played for several clubs in FR Yugoslavia and Turkey. In his late playing career, he was naturalized as a Turkish citizen under the name Sead Dost.

== Playing career ==
Born in Novi Pazar, SR Serbia, Halilagić joined local club FK Novi Pazar in 1983, and debuted for the first team in the 1988–09 season. He later played with FK Željezničar and FK Vojvodina in the First League of FR Yugoslavia. for Istanbulspor, Beşiktaş J.K. and Adanaspor in the Turkish Super Lig and for Slavia Sofia in the Bulgarian A PFG.

== Managerial career ==
After retiring he has received the UEFA Coaching A licence and coached hometown club FK Novi Pazar for a period during the 2006–07 season.

== Personal life ==
Besides being a footballer, Halilagić is also known for being a writer and a poet, with three published books, a short stories compilation Sa obala Tune, and two poetry books, Sazrevanje and Ples. He has also engaged himself in cinema, by directing a movie called Odbrojavanje in 2002 and his passion is also photography.
