= Youssouf Traoré =

Ivorian footballer

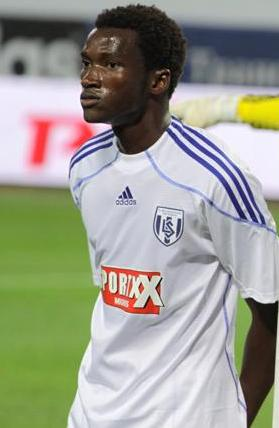
- Traoré in August 2010

Personal information
- Date of birth: 29 January 1991 (age 35)
- Place of birth: Ouragahio, Ivory Coast
- Height: 1.75 m (5 ft 9 in)
- Position: Midfielder

Team information
- Current team: JA Drancy

Youth career
- AS Athlétic Adjamé
- Young Boys

Senior career*
Years	Team	Apps	(Gls)
2008–2013	Young Boys	5	(0)
2010–2011	→ Lausanne-Sport (loan)	14	(0)
2014	US Roye-Noyon	0	(0)
2015–2017	Maccabi Paris	43	(0)
2018–2019	MDA Chasselay	13	(0)
2019–	JA Drancy	10	(0)
- * Club domestic league appearances and goals as of 16:11, 28 April 2020 (UTC)

Youssouf Traoré (born 29 January 1991) is an Ivorian professional footballer who plays as a midfielder for JA Drancy.
