= Ümit Bozkurt =

Turkish footballer (born 1976)

Personal information
- Date of birth: 20 June 1976 (age 50)
- Place of birth: Gaziantep, Turkey
- Height: 1.82 m (6 ft 0 in)
- Position: Defender

Senior career*
Years	Team	Apps	(Gls)
1994–1997	Ankara Demirspor		
1997–2000	Denizlispor		
2000–2002	Beşiktaş	44	(1)
2002–2005	Gençlerbirliği	83	(3)
2005–2006	Konyaspor	23	(0)
2006–2008	Manisaspor	54	(2)
2008–2009	Hacettepe	10	(0)
2009–2010	Diyarbakirspor	13	(0)
2010–2011	Orduspor	2	(0)

International career
2003	Turkey B	1	(0)

Managerial career
- 2012–2013: Eskişehirspor (youth assistant)
- 2013–2014: Konyaspor (youth assistant)
- 2014–2015: Eskişehirspor (assistant)
- 2015: Gençlerbirliği (assistant)
- 2015–2016: Mersin Talim Yurdu (assistant)
- 2016: Sivasspor (assistant)
- 2021: Gençlerbirliği (assistant)
- 2021: Etimesgutspor
- 2022–2023: Vanspor
- 2023: İskenderunspor
- 2023–2024: Vanspor
- 2024: Vanspor
- 2025–2026: Isparta 32
- 2026: Sakaryaspor
- * Club domestic league appearances and goals

Ümit Bozkurt (born 20 April 1976) is a Turkish football coach and a former player. He played sweeper and defensive midfield position.

He has previously played for Denizlispor (1997–2000), Beşiktaş J.K. (2000–02), Gençlerbirliği (2002–05), Konyaspor (2005–06).
