= Turan Uzun =

Turkish footballer

Personal information
- Date of birth: 31 July 1969 (age 57)
- Position: Defender

Senior career*
Years	Team	Apps	(Gls)
1987–1993	Beşiktaş		
1993–1998	Kocaelispor		
1998–1999	Dardanelspor		
- * Club domestic league appearances and goals

Turan Uzun (born 31 July 1969) is a retired Turkish football defender.

== Honours ==
Kocaelispor

- Turkish Cup: 1996–97
