= Vitali Veselov =

Russian footballer

Personal information
- Full name: Vitali Aleksandrovich Veselov
- Date of birth: 13 August 1973 (age 53)
- Place of birth: Moscow, Russian SFSR
- Height: 1.78 m (5 ft 10 in)
- Position: Forward

Youth career
- FC Lokomotiv Moscow

Senior career*
Years	Team	Apps	(Gls)
1992–1999	FC Lokomotiv Moscow	34	(5)
1992–1999	FC Lokomotiv-d Moscow	84	(17)
1994	→ FC Kolos Krasnodar (loan)	6	(1)
1995	→ PFC Spartak Nalchik (loan)	28	(7)
1999	FC Torpedo-ZIL Moscow	5	(0)
2000	FC Saturn Ramenskoye	3	(0)
2000	FC Saturn-2 Moscow Region	8	(2)
2000–2002	FC Arsenal Tula	55	(10)
2003	FC Reutov	11	(2)
2004–2006	Boevoe Bratstvo Moscow Oblast		
- * Club domestic league appearances and goals

Vitali Aleksandrovich Veselov (Russian: Виталий Александрович Веселов; born 13 August 1973) is a former Russian professional football player.

== Honours ==
- Russian Premier League bronze: 1998
- Russian Cup winner: 1996, 1997
- Russian Cup finalist: 1998

== European club competitions ==
With FC Lokomotiv Moscow

- 1996–97 UEFA Cup Winners' Cup: 2 games
- 1997–98 UEFA Cup Winners' Cup: 4 games
