= Abdul Carrupt =

Swiss-born Bissau-Guinean footballer (born 1985)

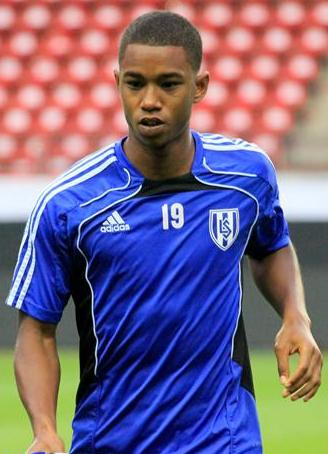

Personal information
- Date of birth: 28 December 1985 (age 40)
- Place of birth: Geneva, Switzerland
- Height: 1.80 m (5 ft 11 in)
- Position: Midfielder

Team information
- Current team: Étoile Carouge
- Number: 10

Senior career*
Years	Team	Apps	(Gls)
2004–2007	Sion	1	(0)
2005–2007	Sion II	45	(28)
2007	Yverdon-Sport	16	(3)
2007–2008	Chiasso	15	(1)
2008–2011	Lausanne-Sport	59	(10)
2011–2012	Nyon	29	(4)
2012–	Étoile Carouge	61	(22)

International career^{‡}
2011–	Guinea-Bissau	1	(0)
- * Club domestic league appearances and goals as of 9 January 2012 ‡ National team caps and goals as of 26 March 2011

Abdul Carrupt (born 28 December 1985) is a professional footballer who currently plays for Swiss club Étoile Carouge. He also holds Swiss citizenship. Born in Switzerland, he represented Guinea-Bissau at international level.
