= Semyon Semenenko =

Russian footballer and official

Personal information
- Full name: Semyon Valeryevich Semenenko
- Date of birth: 9 July 1981 (age 45)
- Place of birth: Novosibirsk, Russian SFSR
- Height: 1.84 m (6 ft 1/2 in)
- Position: Defender

Team information
- Current team: FC Sibir Novosibirsk (general director)

Youth career
- FC Chkalovets Novosibirsk
- UOR Volgograd

Senior career*
Years	Team	Apps	(Gls)
1998–2004	FC Lokomotiv Moscow	7	(0)
1998–2000	→ FC Lokomotiv-d Moscow	63	(3)
2002	→ FC Kuban Krasnodar (loan)	19	(0)
2004	→ FC Sodovik Sterlitamak (loan)	14	(0)
2004	→ FC Baltika Kaliningrad (loan)	9	(1)
2005–2006	FC Lada Togliatti	45	(1)
2007–2009	FC Sibir Novosibirsk	10	(0)
2008	→ FC Sibir-2 Novosibirsk (loan)	22	(4)
2012–2013	FC Sibir-2 Novosibirsk	16	(0)

International career
1999–2000	Russia U-18	12	(2)
2000	Russia U-21	1	(0)

Managerial career
- 2016–: FC Sibir Novosibirsk (general director)
- * Club domestic league appearances and goals

Semyon Valeryevich Semenenko (Russian: Семён Валерьевич Семене́нко; born 9 July 1981) is a Russian professional football official and a former player. He works as a general director of FC Sibir Novosibirsk.

He made his debut in the Russian Premier League in 1999 for FC Lokomotiv Moscow. He played 2 games in the UEFA Cup 1999–2000 for FC Lokomotiv Moscow.

== Honours ==
- Russian Premier League runner-up: 1999.
- Russian Cup winner: 2000.
