= Shuki Nagar =

Israeli footballer

Personal information
- Full name: Yehoshua Nagar
- Date of birth: October 7, 1977 (age 49)
- Place of birth: Yehud, Israel
- Position: Left back

Team information
- Current team: Beitar Yavne

Youth career
- Bnei Yehuda

Senior career*
Years	Team	Apps	(Gls)
1995–1998	Bnei Yehuda	67	(1)
1998–2000	Maccabi Haifa	57	(1)
2000–2001	Bnei Yehuda	35	(0)
2001–2003	Hapoel Be'er Sheva	61	(6)
2003–2004	F.C. Ashdod	17	(0)
2004	Hapoel Be'er Sheva	2	(0)
2004–2005	Maccabi Tel Aviv	11	(0)
2005–2006	Bnei Sakhnin	15	(0)
2006–2007	Hakoah Amidar Ramat Gan	31	(2)
2007–2008	Hapoel Petah Tikva	35	(4)
2009	Maccabi Herzliya	10	(0)
2009–2010	Hapoel Ashkelon	31	(2)
2010–2012	Maccabi Ahi Nazareth	61	(1)
2012–2015	Maccabi Yavne	69	(0)
2015	Beitar Yavne	4	(0)

International career
1996–1999	Israel U21	18	(1)
- * Club domestic league appearances and goals as of 1 November 2015

Shuki Nagar (Hebrew: שוקי נגר; born October 7, 1977) is a former Israeli footballer.

== Career ==
Nagar was considered one of the hottest prospects in Israeli football during his youth at Bnei Yehuda. Injuries and a lack of playing time hampered his ascension to becoming a prominent figure in Israeli football, and most of his career he bounced around between relegation bound clubs in the Israeli Premier League and clubs who were trying to get promotion from Liga Leumit.

On June 25, 2012, Nagar signed with Maccabi Yavne, he played there for 3 years. In the middle of the 2014–15 season, Nagar started to work as the CEO of the club. He was fired from his job in the end of the 2015–16 season as Yavne got relegated to Liga Alef.

== Honours ==
- Israel State Cup (1):
  - 2005
- Liga Leumit (1):
  - 2007–08
