= Avishai Jano =

Israeli footballer

Avishai Jano אבישי ז'אנו
Personal information
- Date of birth: 19 July 1970 (age 56)
- Place of birth: Nazareth Illit, Israel
- Position: Defender

Youth career
- Maccabi Netanya

Senior career*
Years	Team	Apps	(Gls)
1987–1988	Maccabi Netanya	13	(0)
1988–1990	Maccabi Ahi Nazareth	59	(7)
1990–1991	Hapoel Nazareth Illit	18	(2)
1991–1995	Maccabi Netanya	118	(7)
1995–2004	Maccabi Haifa	244	(15)
2004–2006	Hapoel Nazareth Illit	53	(1)
2006–2007	Maccabi Netanya	18	(0)
2007–2008	Ironi Tiberias	23	(0)
2008	Hapoel Hadera	3	(0)
2008–2009	Ironi Tiberias	18	(0)

International career
1994–2003	Israel	16	(0)
- * Club domestic league appearances and goals

Avishai (Yaish) Jano (Hebrew: אבישי ז'אנו) is an Israeli international footballer. Jano played usually as an attacking right defender or a right winger. He spent most of his career in Maccabi Haifa (1995–2004), with whom he won all of his honours. Jano retired from football in 2009.

== Honours ==
- Israeli Premier League (3):
  - 2000–01, 2001–02, 2003–04
- Israel State Cup (1):
  - 1997–98
- Toto Cup (1):
  - 2001–02
