= Christian Magleby =

Danish footballer (born 1977)

Personal information
- Date of birth: 8 June 1977 (age 49)
- Place of birth: Kastrup, Denmark
- Height: 1.79 m (5 ft 10 in)
- Position: Midfielder

Youth career
- Kastrup Boldklub
- Fremad Amager
- Brøndby

Senior career*
Years	Team	Apps	(Gls)
1995–1996	Brøndby	0	(0)
1997–2001	Lyngby	90	(8)
2001–2003	Midtjylland	38	(2)
2004–2006	Viborg	34	(3)
Total		162	(13)

International career
1992–1993	Denmark U17	8	(2)
1994–1995	Denmark U19	14	(0)
1996–1998	Denmark U21	25	(4)
- * Club domestic league appearances and goals

Christian Magleby (born 8 June 1977) is a Danish former professional footballer who played as a midfielder.

== Club career ==
Magleby progressed through the Brøndby youth academy under the tutelage of Tom Køhlert, and made his senior debut for the club on 3 October 1995 in a 5–1 away win over Næstved Boldklub's reserves in the Danish League Cup. He was offered a four-year contract with the club in December 1996, but left for Lyngby in January 1997, as they were willing to offer him a deal which harmonised with his wish to finish his studies. His stay in Lyngby was highly successful, and he claimed in an interview that Premier League club Liverpool had shown interest in him in 2000.

On 27 December 2001, Magleby joined Midtjylland on a three-year deal after Lyngby's bankruptcy. He made his competitive debut for the club on 10 March 2002 in a 1–0 victory against local rivals Silkeborg.

Magleby signed a three-year contract with Viborg on 1 September 2003, arriving at the club alongside Stefan Bidstrup from AaB.

He played a combined 162 games and scored 13 goals in the Danish Superliga from 1997 to 2005.

== International career ==
Magleby played 25 games and scored four goals for the Denmark national under-21 football team from 1996 to 1999, and was named 1999 Danish under-21 Player of the Year.
