= Marián Šuchančok =

Slovak footballer

Personal information
- Full name: Marián Šuchančok
- Date of birth: 13 July 1971 (age 55)
- Place of birth: Košice, Czechoslovakia
- Height: 1.83 m (6 ft 0 in)
- Position: Defender

Senior career*
| Years | Team | Apps | (Gls) |
| 1992–1994 | Trebišov | | |
| 1994–1996 | JAS Bardejov | 59 | (3) |
| 1996–2002 | Inter Bratislava | 152 | (17) |
| 2002–2003 | Akratitos | 11 | (0) |
| 2003–2004 | Kapfenberger SV | 8 | (0) |
| 2005 | FC Oslip | | |

International career
| 1999–2001 | Slovakia | 9 | (0) |

Managerial career
- 2006–2008: Inter Bratislava (Assistant)
- 2011–2012: FC Nitra (Assistant)
- 2013–2014: Gabčíkovo (Assistant)
- 2015–: Most pri Bratislave
- * Club domestic league appearances and goals

Marián Šuchančok (born 13 July 1971) is a retired Slovak international footballer who played as a defender for clubs in Slovakia, Greece and Austria.

== Club career ==
Born in Košice, Šuchančok began playing football with local side FK Slavoj Trebišov.

In January 2002, he would move abroad to play for Super League Greece side Akratitos F.C., where he would make 11 league appearances before leaving in January 2003.

== International career ==
Šuchančok made nine appearances for the Slovakia national football team from 1999 to 2001, including one FIFA World Cup qualifying match.
