= Stanimir Dimitrov =

Bulgarian footballer

Personal information
- Date of birth: 24 April 1972 (age 54)
- Place of birth: Radnevo, Bulgaria
- Height: 6 ft 2 in (1.88 m)
- Position: Midfielder

Senior career*
Years	Team	Apps	(Gls)
1990–1994	Minyor Radnevo	?	(?)
1994–2005	Naftex Burgas	264	(38)
2005–2009	FC Tobol	108	(6)

International career
1998	Bulgaria	1	(0)
- * Club domestic league appearances and goals

Stanimir Dimitrov (born 24 April 1972 in Radnevo) is a former Bulgarian footballer.

== Career ==
Dimitrov start to play football in his home town Radnevo in local club Minyor. In 1994, he signed with PFC Naftex Burgas, with whom made his debut in A PFG. Dimitrov earned 264 appearances playing in the top division, scored 38 goals.

In 2005, he signed with FC Tobol, where plays as a central defender. In December 2005, Dimitrov was named the 2005 Foreign Footballer of the Year in Kazakhstan. For Tobol he earned 108 appearances and scored 6 goals.
