= Armand Dubois Yankep =

Cameroonian footballer

Armand Yankep
Personal information
- Full name: Armand Dubois Yankep
- Date of birth: 17 December 1985 (age 40)
- Place of birth: Yaoundé, Cameroon
- Height: 1.76 m (5 ft 9 in)
- Position: Midfielder

Youth career
- 2004: Slaven Belupo

Senior career*
Years	Team	Apps	(Gls)
2004	Mladost Ždralovi		
2005–2007	Rabotnički	47	(0)
2007–2008	Vinogradar	23	(1)
2008–2011	Inter Zaprešić	30	(1)
2012–2013	Okzhetpes	12	(0)
2013	Vinogradar	2	(0)
2013–2016	Savski Marof		
2016	Ivančna Gorica	9	(1)
- * Club domestic league appearances and goals

Armand Dubois Yankep (born 17 December 1985) is a Cameroonian former professional footballer who played as a midfielder.

== Career ==
Yankep was born in Yaoundé. He joined Inter Zaprešić in July 2008 from NK Vinogradar, and before that he played for FK Rabotnički in the Macedonian First League.

In some sources his surname is spelled Jankep.

Following three seasons playing for fourth-tier Savski Marof in Croatia, Yankep moved in the summer of 2016 to third-tier Slovenian side NK Ivančna Gorica where he played until the end of 2016. He finished his career in late 2016.
