= Denys Onyshchenko =

Ukrainian footballer

Denys Onyshchenko Денис Онищенко
Personal information
- Full name: Denys Anatoliyovych Onyshchenko
- Date of birth: 15 September 1978 (age 48)
- Place of birth: Poltava, Ukrainian SSR
- Height: 1.80 m (5 ft 11 in)
- Position: Midfielder

Youth career
- 1992–1993: DVUFK Dnipropetrovsk

Senior career*
Years	Team	Apps	(Gls)
1993–1994	FC Dnipro Dnipropetrovsk	0	(0)
1994–1996	FC Metalurh Novomoskovsk	37	(2)
1996–1999	FC Dynamo Kyiv	2	(0)
1996–1999	→ FC Dynamo-2 Kyiv (loans)	77	(7)
1997–1999	→ FC Dynamo-3 Kyiv (loans)	22	(4)
1999	FC Dnipro Dnipropetrovsk	3	(0)
1999	→ FC Dnipro-2 Dnipropetrovsk (loan)	6	(0)
1999	FC Dynamo Kyiv	0	(0)
1999	→ FC Dynamo-2 Kyiv (loan)	3	(0)
1999	→ FC Dynamo-3 Kyiv (loan)	2	(1)
2000–2003	Hapoel Tel Aviv F.C.	79	(2)
2003–2005	FC Dynamo Kyiv	9	(2)
2003–2005	→ FC Dynamo-2 Kyiv (loans)	8	(0)
2005–2006	FC Vorskla Poltava	23	(1)
2006	FC Tom Tomsk	7	(0)
2006–2007	FC Zorya Luhansk	7	(0)
2007–2008	FC Illichivets Mariupol	1	(0)

International career
2002–2004	Ukraine	3	(0)
- * Club domestic league appearances and goals

Denys Anatoliyovych Onyshchenko (Ukrainian: Денис Анатолійович Онищенко; born 15 September 1978) is a former Ukrainian football player. He played for Hapoel Tel Aviv FC in the Israeli Premier League and for FC Dynamo Kyiv. Onyshchenko also has three international caps for Ukraine.

== Honours ==
Dynamo Kyiv

- Ukrainian Premier League champion: 1998–99, 2003–04

Hapoel Tel Aviv

- Israeli Premier League champion: 1999–2000
- Israeli Premier League runner-up: 2000–01, 2001–02
- Israeli Premier League bronze: 2002–03
- Israel State Cup winner: 1999–2000
