= David Kılınç =

Swiss footballer (born 1992)

Personal information
- Full name: David Deniz Kılınç
- Date of birth: 19 January 1992 (age 34)
- Place of birth: Lausanne, Switzerland
- Height: 1.83 m (6 ft 0 in)
- Position: Central midfielder

Team information
- Current team: Bavois
- Number: 6

Youth career
- 2006–2010: Lausanne-Sport

Senior career*
Years	Team	Apps	(Gls)
2010–2012	Lausanne-Sport	1	(0)
2010–2012	Lausanne-Sport II	10	(1)
2012–2014	Le Mont	39	(2)
2014	Bavois	1	(0)
2014–2015	Elazığspor	25	(0)
2015–2018	Bandırmaspor	71	(11)
2018–2019	Altınordu	14	(1)
2019–2021	Sancaktepe	38	(4)
2021	Balıkesirspor	1	(0)
2021–	Bavois	38	(3)
- * Club domestic league appearances and goals as of 1 October 2022

David Deniz Kılınç (born 19 January 1992) is a Swiss professional footballer who plays as a midfielder for Bavois.
