= Oleg Garin (footballer) =

Russian football player and coach (1966–2026)

Personal information
- Full name: Oleg Sergeyevich Garin
- Date of birth: 22 September 1966
- Place of birth: Nakhodka, Primorsky Krai, Russian SFSR, Soviet Union
- Date of death: October 2026 (aged 60)
- Height: 1.70 m (5 ft 7 in)
- Position: Forward

Senior career*
Years	Team	Apps	(Gls)
1984	Luch Vladivostok	3	(0)
1987–1992	Okean Nakhodka	202	(87)
1993–1997	Lokomotiv Moscow	118	(40)
1998–1999	Lokomotiv Nizhny Novgorod	40	(15)
1999	Uralan Elista	11	(1)
2000	Lada Togliatti	3	(0)
2000–2001	Okean Nakhodka	30	(5)

Managerial career
- 2005–2007: Okean Nakhodka
- 2007–2008: Metallurg Krasnoyarsk
- 2010–2011: Dynamo Bryansk (assistant)
- 2011: Dynamo Bryansk (caretaker)
- 2015–2016: Dynamo Bryansk
- * Club domestic league appearances and goals

Oleg Sergeyevich Garin (Russian: Олег Сергеевич Гарин; 22 September 1966 – October 2026) was a Russian professional football coach and player. He is best known for his time with Lokomotiv Moscow in the 1990s.

Garin died in October 2026, aged 60. His nephew, Aleksandr Tikhonovetsky, also played football professionally.

== Honours ==
- Russian Premier League: runner-up, 1995, bronze 1994
- Russian Cup: 1996, 1997
- Top 33 year-end best players list: 1992, 1994, 1995
