= Filip Madžovski =

Macedonian footballer

Personal information
- Full name: Filip Madžovski; Филип Маџовски
- Date of birth: 1 January 1984 (age 42)
- Place of birth: Skopje, SFR Yugoslavia
- Position: Goalkeeper

Youth career
- Rabotnički

Senior career*
Years	Team	Apps	(Gls)
2003–2007	Rabotnički	56	(1)
2008–2009	Milano Kumanovo	11	(0)
2009–2010	Vardar	8	(0)
2010–2011	Đồng Tâm Long An	4	(0)
2012	Rabotnički	6	(0)

International career^{‡}
2005	Macedonia	3	(0)
- * Club domestic league appearances and goals as of 14 August 2010 ‡ National team caps and goals as of 11 August 2010

Filip Madžovski (born 1 January 1984) is a retired footballer (goalkeeper) who last played for FK Rabotnički.

== International career ==
He made his senior debut for Macedonia in a June 2005 FIFA World Cup qualification match away against Armenia and has earned a total of 3 caps, scoring no goals. His final international was an August 2005 FIFA World Cup qualification match against Finland in Skopje.
