= Odair =

Brazilian footballer

Personal information
- Full name: Odair Albornoz Rivas
- Date of birth: 15 October 1973 (age 53)
- Place of birth: Montes Claros, Brazil
- Height: 1.80 m (5 ft 11 in)
- Position: Defender

Senior career*
Years	Team	Apps	(Gls)
1995	Democrata-GV		
1996	Atlético Mineiro		
1997–1998	Cruzeiro		
1998–2003	Braga	113	(14)
2003	Belenenses	16	(1)
2003–2006	Penafiel	76	(3)
2007	Uberlândia		
2007	Araxá		
2008	Mineiros		
2008–2010	Funorte		
- * Club domestic league appearances and goals

Odair Albornoz Rivas, known as Odair (born 15 October 1973) is a Brazilian former professional footballer who played as a defender.

He played seven seasons and 174 games (scoring 18 goals) in the Primeira Liga for Braga, Penafiel and Belenenses.

== Career ==
Odair made his Primeira Liga debut for Braga on 30 August 1998 as a starter in a 2–0 victory against Farense.
