= Andrey Svirkov =

Belarusian footballer and coach

Personal information
- Full name: Andrey Gennadyevich Svirkov
- Date of birth: 1 January 1972 (age 54)
- Place of birth: Bobruisk, Byelorussian SSR, Soviet Union
- Height: 1.85 m (6 ft 1 in)
- Position: Goalkeeper

Team information
- Current team: Belshina Bobruisk (reserves manager)

Senior career*
Years	Team	Apps	(Gls)
1992–1994	Fandok Bobruisk	46	(1)
1995	MPKC Mozyr	18	(0)
1996–1997	Belshina Bobruisk	33	(0)
1998	Torpedo Minsk	19	(0)
1999	Svisloch-Krovlya Osipovichi	14	(0)
2000	Torpedo-MAZ Minsk	17	(0)
2002	Lokomotiv Minsk	1	(0)
2002	Khimik Svetlogorsk	14	(0)
2003–2004	Baranovichi	53	(0)
2004	Dnepr-DUSSh-1 Rogachev	15	(0)
2005–2007	Baranovichi	41	(0)

Managerial career
- 2008–2011: Spartak Nalchik (gk coach)
- 2013–2016: Gomel (gk coach)
- 2016–2018: Belshina Bobruisk (gk coach)
- 2018: UAS Zhitkovichi
- 2019–2020: Belshina Bobruisk (gk coach)
- 2021–: Belshina Bobruisk (reserves)
- * Club domestic league appearances and goals

Andrey Svirkov (born 1 January 1972) is a Belarusian professional football coach and a former player. He is a younger brother of Yury Svirkov, who is also former professional football goalkeeper. The brothers played alongside each other in a number of teams throughout their careers and also worked together in Spartak Nalchik, until Yury left the team in 2009.

== Honours ==
Belshina Bobruisk

- Belarusian Cup winner: 1996–97
