= Shlomo Tzemah =

Israeli footballer

Shlomo Tzemah שלמה צמח
Personal information
- Full name: Shlomo Tzemah
- Date of birth: June 5, 1981 (age 45)
- Place of birth: Petah Tikva, Israel
- Position: Midfielder

Team information
- Current team: Beitar Kfar Saba

Youth career
- Maccabi Petah Tikva

Senior career*
Years	Team	Apps	(Gls)
2006–2009	Maccabi Petah Tikva	176	(6)
2009–2010	Hapoel Ironi Kiryat Shmona	29	(0)
2010	Hapoel Nir Ramat HaSharon	9	(0)
2010–2011	Maccabi Kabilio Jaffa	19	(0)
2011–2012	Hapoel Herzliya	24	(0)
2012	Beitar Kfar Saba	6	(0)
2012–2014	Maccabi Kabilio Jaffa	51	(4)
2014–2015	F.C. Shikun HaMizrah	29	(1)
2015–2016	Hapoel Mahane Yehuda	30	(1)
2017	Hapoel Bik'at HaYarden	30	(1)
2017–2018	Beitar Kfar Saba	20	(0)
2018–2019	Hapoel Mahane Yehuda	29	(2)
2019	Shimshon Bnei Taybe	0	(0)
2019–2020	Maccabi Amishav Petah Tikva	4	(0)
2020–	Beitar Petah Tikva	21	(0)
2021–2022	→ Sporting Tel Aviv	11	(0)
2022	→ Hapoel Bnei Lod	12	(2)
2022–2023	→ Hapoel Ashkelon	2	(0)
2023–2024	→ Hapoel Gadera	19	(1)
- * Club domestic league appearances and goals ‡ National team caps and goals as of 1 June 2024

Shlomo "Soli" Tzemah (Hebrew: שלמה "סולי" צמח; born 5 June 1981) is an Israeli footballer who currently plays for Beitar Kfar Saba.
