= Marios Stylianou =

Cypriot footballer (born 1993)

Personal information
- Date of birth: 23 September 1993 (age 33)
- Height: 1.82 m (6 ft 0 in)
- Position: Right back

Team information
- Current team: Krasava ENY Ypsonas FC
- Number: 28

Senior career*
Years	Team	Apps	(Gls)
2011–2019	Apollon Limassol	82	(1)
2019–2021	Anorthosis	0	(0)
2020	→ Omonia (loan)	0	(0)
2021	→ Karmiotissa (loan)	9	(0)
2021–2023	Doxa Katokopias	69	(0)
2024–2025	Ethnikos Achna	30	(2)
2025–	Krasava ENY Ypsonas FC	0	(0)

International career^{‡}
2014–	Cyprus	6	(0)
- * Club domestic league appearances and goals as of 28 April 2025 ‡ National team caps and goals as of 18:43, 17 January 2021 (UTC)

Marios Stylianou (born 23 September 1993) is a Cypriot international footballer who plays for Krasava ENY Ypsonas FC, as a right back.

== Career ==
Stylianou has played club football for Apollon Limassol, Anorthosis, Omonia and Karmiotissa.

He made his international debut for Cyprus in 2014.
