= Per Fahlström =

Swedish footballer

Personal information
- Full name: Per Erik Fahlström
- Date of birth: 27 December 1967 (age 58)
- Place of birth: Stockholm, Sweden
- Height: 1.93 m (6 ft 4 in)
- Position: Goalkeeper

Youth career
- IFK Skogås

Senior career*
Years	Team	Apps	(Gls)
1986–1989	Huddinge IF	80	(0)
1990–1998	Hammarby IF	202	(0)
1999–2002	Lyngby BK	86	(0)
- * Club domestic league appearances and goals

Per "Pelle" Fahlström (born 27 December 1967) is a Swedish former professional footballer who played as a goalkeeper, best known for representing Hammarby IF and Lyngby BK.

== Club career ==
=== Huddinge IF ===
Fahlström was born and raised in Stockholm, where he started to play football with local club IFK Skogås as a youngster. In 1987, at age 18, he moved to Huddinge IF. He played a major part as the club won two promotions to Division 2, the domestic third tier, in just four seasons.

=== Hammarby IF ===
In 1990, following his impressing form, Fahlström transferred to Hammarby IF in Allsvenskan. He played 14 games in his debut season, sharing duties with Jari Poutiainen, as the squad consisted of several homegrown youngsters due to financial difficulties. The club finished at the foot of the table, mostly due to a lack of defensive play, letting in a total of 52 goals in just 22 games, getting relegated to Division 1.

In the following seasons, Fahlström claimed his place as a starter for Hammarby in the second division. Manager Kenneth Ohlsson was, however, unable to guide the club to a promotion either in 1991 nor 1992. Ultimately, Hammarby won Division 1 in 1993, finishing six points ahead of contender Vasalunds IF, with the forces being led by Fahlström and prolific goalscorer Hans Eskilsson.

Back in Allsvenskan 1994, Hammarby finished 12th in the table, but won the first Swedish Futsal Championship the same year. The following season, in 1995, Hammarby was relegated once again; pundits blamed manager Tommy Davidsson for opting to play a much to defensive style.

He competed with Hammarby in Division 1 for the next two seasons, before making a second comeback in Allsvenskan in 1998. Surprisingly, Hammarby finished 3rd in the table, just four points behind champions AIK. After the impressive season, Fahlström sought a move elsewhere and decided to leave the club, as Hammarby already had brought Lars Eriksson in as a replacement. In total, Fahlström made 202 league appearances for Hammarby, of which 89 in Allsvenskan.

=== Lyngby BK ===
In 1999, Fahlström moved to Lyngby BK. He soon established himself a starter for the side in the Danish Superliga, making 86 competitive appearances in three seasons, while also competing in the UEFA Cup. In the summer of 2002, Fahlström attracted a serious knee injury that forced him to retire from football a year later, aged 34.

== Personal life ==
Outside of sports, Fahlström works as a policeman. After his retirement from football, he has been a press officer for the local police department in Stockholm. He has also worked as a goalkeeping coach with the Swedish Football Association and most notably the women's national team.
