= Miroslav Hýll =

Slovak footballer and manager

Personal information
- Date of birth: 20 September 1973 (age 53)
- Place of birth: Žilina, Czechoslovakia
- Height: 1.82 m (6 ft 0 in)
- Position: Goalkeeper

Youth career
- –1993: Inter Bratislava

Senior career*
Years	Team	Apps	(Gls)
1993–1994	MŠK Žilina	28	(0)
1994–2004	Inter Bratislava	298	(0)
2004–2005	Oghab	22	(0)
2005–2006	VfB Admira Wacker Mödling	1	(0)
2006	Zob Ahan	10	(0)
2006–2007	Bargh Shiraz	19	(0)
2007–2009	Artmedia Petržalka	13	(0)
Total		391	(0)

International career
1997–2002	Czechoslovakia U16		
1997–2002	Slovakia	6	(0)

Managerial career
- 2009: Šamorín (goalkeeper coach)
- 2013: Al Wahda (assistant)
- 2014: Šamorín
- * Club domestic league appearances and goals

Miroslav Hýll (born 20 September 1973) is a Slovak football manager and former player who recently managed FC ŠTK 1914 Šamorín. A goalkeeper, he spent most of his career with Inter Bratislava. He made six appearances for the Slovakia national team.

== Early life ==
Miroslav Hýll was born in Žilina, Slovakia on 20 September 1973.

== Career ==
Hýll won the 1990 UEFA European Under-16 Championship with Czechoslovakia, together with players such as Tomáš Řepka and Patrik Berger. Hýll played all three group games and the semi-final without conceding any goals, before his team beat Portugal 3–2 in the final.

He spent most of his football career at Inter Bratislava. At Inter he won the Slovak Cup three times, in 1995 and 2000 and then won the double (league title and the Slovak Cup) in 2001.

His best performance in European competition was the 2000–01 UEFA Champions League qualifying round, where Inter Bratislava reached the third qualifying round before being eliminated by Lyon.

Hýll played three years in Iran for the clubs Oghab, Zob Ahan and Bargh Shiraz, interspersed with a short spell in Austrian VfB Admira Wacker Mödling. In 2007 he returned home to Artmedia Petržalka.

== Post-playing career ==
After retiring, Hýll worked as a goalkeeper coach in Petrzalka before compatriot Jozef Hroš brought him to the United Arab Emirates. In the summer of 2013, he became assistant manager of Al Wahda Club under Karel Jarolím. Hýll left after Jarolím finished his tenure; in 2014 Hýll was announced as manager of Slovak team FC ŠTK 1914 Šamorín.

== Personal life ==
He was nicknamed "Beny Hýll", resembling the name of comedian Benny Hill.
