= Silvije Čavlina =

Croatian footballer

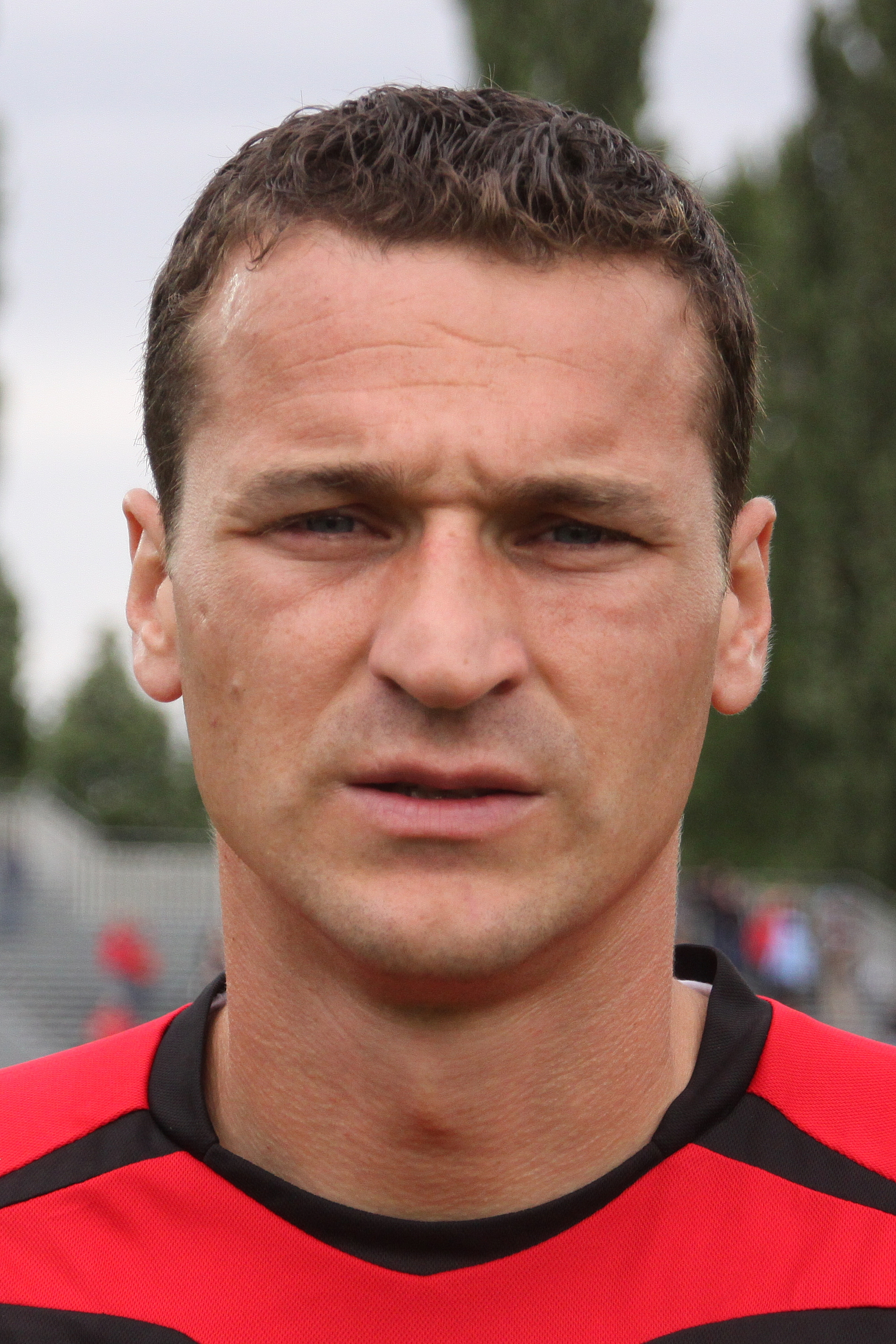

Personal information
- Full name: Silvije Čavlina
- Date of birth: 22 April 1977 (age 49)
- Place of birth: Zagreb, SR Croatia, SFR Yugoslavia
- Height: 1.93 m (6 ft 4 in)
- Position: Goalkeeper

Team information
- Current team: Osijek (goalkeeping coach)

Youth career
- Lokomotiva
- Hajduk Split

Senior career*
Years	Team	Apps	(Gls)
1996–2003	Hrvatski Dragovoljac	84	(0)
1998–1999	→ Lokomotiva (loan)		
2003–2004	Inter Zaprešić	3	(0)
2004–2006	Kamen Ingrad	49	(0)
2006	Hapoel Petah Tikva	13	(0)
2006–2007	Šibenik	28	(0)
2007–2010	LASK Linz	75	(0)
2010–2012	Sturm Graz	28	(0)
2012–2015	Inter Zaprešić	0	(0)
Total		277	(0)

International career
1994	Croatia U18	1	(0)
1997–2000	Croatia U21	8	(0)

Managerial career
- 2018–2020: Dinamo Zagreb (goalkeeping coach)
- 2020–: Osijek (goalkeeping coach)
- * Club domestic league appearances and goals

Silvije Čavlina (born 22 April 1977) is a Croatian retired professional footballer who played as a goalkeeper. He currently serves as a goalkeeping coach of Croatian First Football League club NK Osijek.

== Club career ==
He started his career in the youth system of Lokomotiva and Hajduk Split and subsequently played first-team football with Croatian clubs Hrvatski Dragovoljac, Lokomotiva Zagreb, Inter Zaprešić and Kamen Ingrad. In 2006, he spent seven months with Israeli side Hapoel Petah Tikva, before returning to Croatia in August of the same year to spend the 2006–07 season with Šibenik.

In the summer of 2007, he moved to LASK Linz of the Austrian Bundesliga, where he made a total of 74 league appearances over the following three seasons. In the summer of 2010, he moved to another Austrian Bundesliga side, Sturm Graz, staying for 2 seasons before moving to Inter Zaprešić.

== International career ==
Between 1997 and 2000, he won 8 international caps for the Croatian national under-21 football team.
