= Osman Çakır =

Turkish footballer

Personal information
- Date of birth: 16 June 1967 (age 59)
- Position: Defender

Youth career
- -1983: Gebzespor

Senior career*
Years	Team	Apps	(Gls)
1983-1984	Gebzespor		
1984–2000	Kocaelispor	278	(3)
2000-2001	İzmit Bekirpaşaspor	9	(0)
- * Club domestic league appearances and goals

Osman Çakır (born 16 June 1967) is a retired Turkish football defender.

== Honours ==
Kocaelispor

- Turkish Cup: 1996–97
