= Patrik Ježek =

Czech footballer

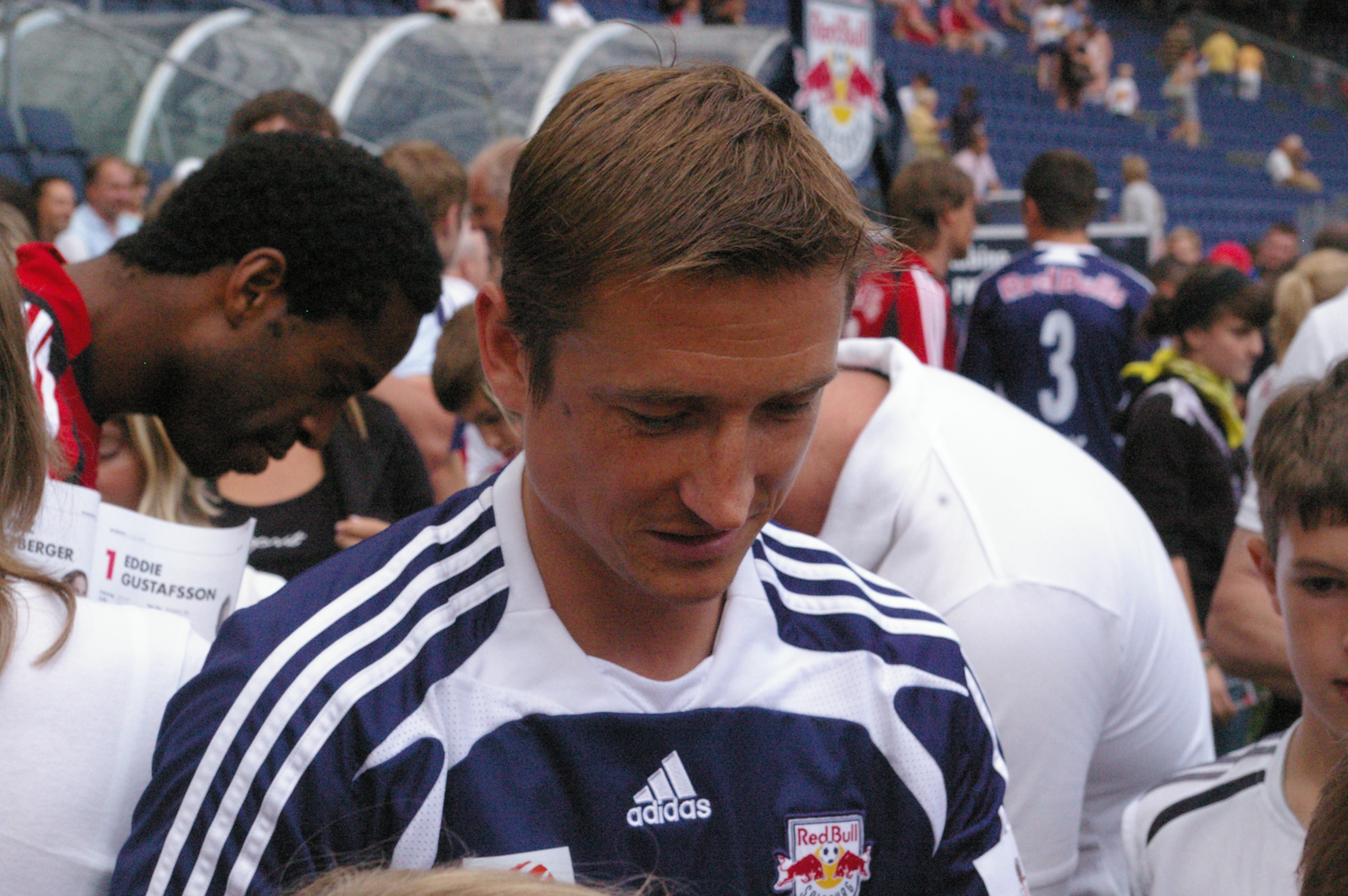

Personal information
- Full name: Patrik Ježek
- Date of birth: 28 December 1976 (age 49)
- Place of birth: Plzeň, Czechoslovakia
- Height: 1.72 m (5 ft 7 1/2 in)
- Position: Midfielder

Senior career*
Years	Team	Apps	(Gls)
1994–1998	FC Viktoria Plzeň	64	(7)
1998–2000	FC Tirol Innsbruck	68	(13)
2000–2001	Austria Wien	28	(2)
2001–2002	FC Tirol Innsbruck	48	(7)
2002–2003	Karlsruher SC	11	(0)
2003–2004	Sparta Prague	11	(2)
2004–2005	SV Pasching	45	(1)
2005–2009	Red Bull Salzburg	102	(21)
2010–2013	Admira Wacker	100	(32)
Total		477	(85)

International career
1996–1997	Czech Republic U21	7	(1)
- * Club domestic league appearances and goals

Patrik Ježek (born 28 December 1976) is a former Czech football midfielder who last played for Admira Wacker in the Austrian Bundesliga. He scored the fastest goal in Austrian league history, scoring after 10 seconds in a 4–1 win against Altach in the opening round of the 2007–08 season.

== Honours ==
- 4× Austrian Champion (2000 with FK Austria Wien, 2002 with FC Tirol Innsbruck, 2007 and 2009 with FC Red Bull Salzburg)
- 1× Czech Champion (2003 with Sparta Prague)
- fastest goal (10 seconds) in the history of Austrian football
