= Ilan Bakhar =

Israeli footballer

Personal information
- Full name: אילן בכר
- Date of birth: May 17, 1975 (age 51)
- Place of birth: Ramat Gan, Israel
- Height: 1.87 m (6 ft 2 in)
- Position: Right back

Youth career
- 1990–1993: Hapoel Ramat Gan

Senior career*
Years	Team	Apps	(Gls)
1993–1995	Hapoel Ramat Gan	41	(2)
1995–1998	Maccabi Herzliya	62	(9)
1998–1999	Beitar Jerusalem	25	(0)
1999–2002	Hapoel Tel Aviv	79	(4)
2002–2003	Racing Santander	2	(0)
2003–2004	FC Ashdod	27	(2)
2004–2005	Sporting Braga B	2	(0)
2005–2006	Maccabi Herzliya	31	(1)
2006–2007	Hakoah Ramat Gan	10	(0)
2007	Hapoel Nazareth Illit	13	(0)
2007	Hapoel Be'er Sheva	2	(0)

International career
2000–2003	Israel	6	(0)
- * Club domestic league appearances and goals

Ilan Bakhar (Hebrew: אילן בכר; born May 17, 1975, in Ramat Gan) is a retired Israeli footballer who played as a right defender.

== Football career ==
During his 14-year professional career, Bakhar played for seven different clubs in his country. He also had two unassuming stints abroad: with Racing de Santander in Spain, being part of the first pair of Israelis to sign with the Cantabrians, alongside Yossi Benayoun, and playing only twice during the season, and in Portugal with Sporting de Braga (no appearances).

Bakhar gained six caps for the national team, in a three-year span.

== Honours ==
- Israeli League: 1999–2000
- Israeli Cup: 1999–2000
- Toto Cup: 2001–02
