= Josep Setvalls =

Spanish footballer

Personal information
- Full name: Josep Setvalls Morera
- Date of birth: 20 August 1974 (age 52)
- Place of birth: Navarcles, Spain
- Height: 1.80 m (5 ft 11 in)
- Position: Midfielder

Youth career
- Barcelona

Senior career*
Years	Team	Apps	(Gls)
1994–1995	Barcelona C		
1995–1997	Barcelona B	67	(3)
1996	Barcelona	1	(0)
1997–2000	Lleida	118	(13)
2000–2001	Rayo Vallecano	21	(1)
2001–2002	Levante	27	(4)
2002–2003	Murcia	28	(3)
2004–2005	Cartagena		
Total		262	(24)
- * Club domestic league appearances and goals

Josep "Pep" Setvalls Morera (born 20 August 1974) is a Spanish former footballer who played as a central midfielder.
