= 2017–18 FC Lokomotiv Moscow season =

FC Lokomotiv Moscow
2017–18 season
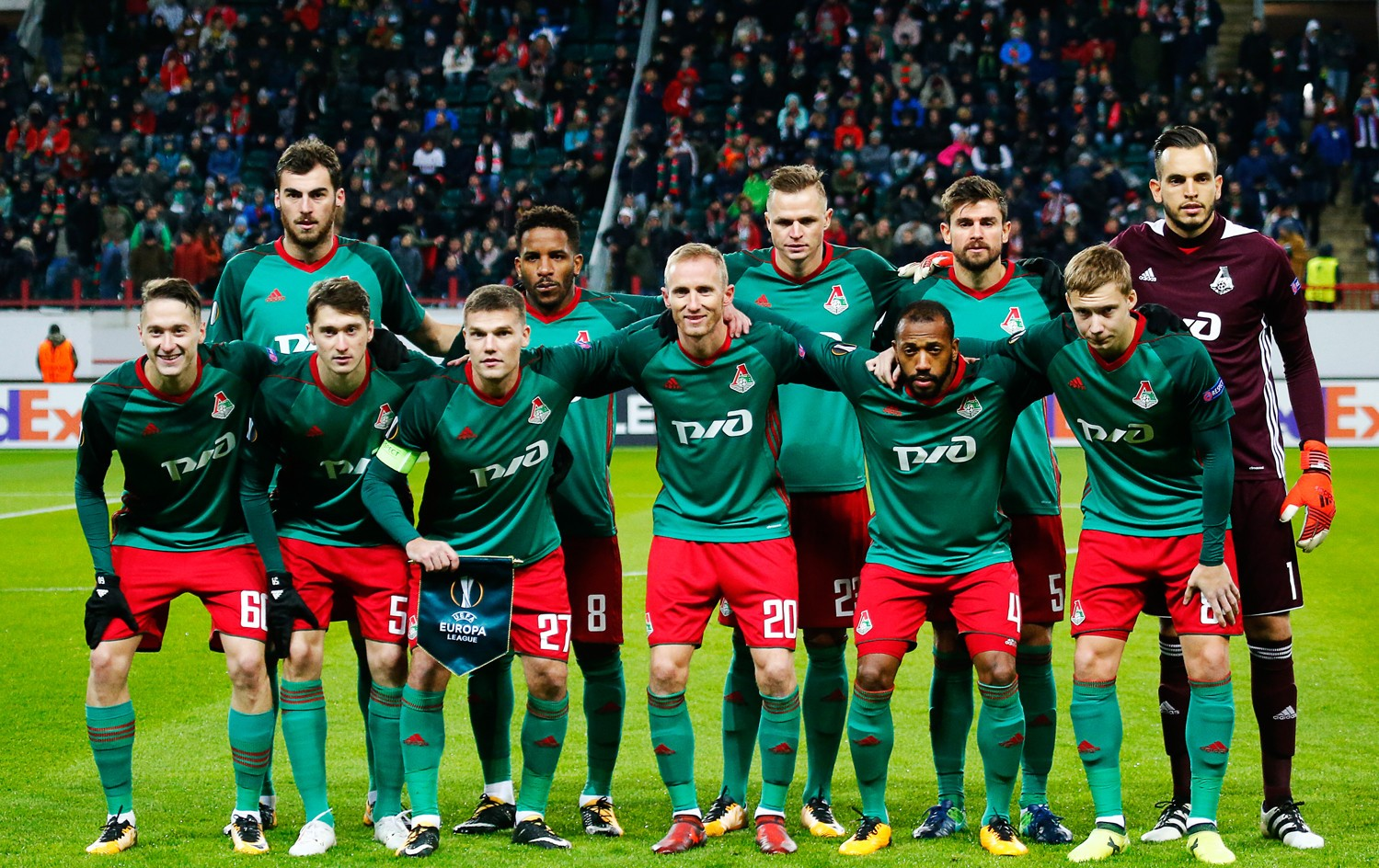
- Chairman: Ilya Herkus
- Manager: Yury Semin
- Stadium: RZD Arena
- Russian Premier League: 1st (champions)
- Super Cup: Runners-up
- Russian Cup: Round of 32
- UEFA Europa League: Round of 16
- Top goalscorer: League: Jefferson Farfán (10 goals); All: Jefferson Farfán; Manuel Fernandes (14 each)
- Highest home attendance: 26,109 vs Zenit (RFPL, 5 May 2018)
- Lowest home attendance: 6,166 vs Arsenal (RFPL, 18 July 2017)
- Average home league attendance: 12,708
Home colours	Away colours	Third colours

The 2017–18 FC Lokomotiv Moscow season was the club's 26th season in the Russian Premier League, the highest tier of the Russian football league system. Lokomotiv Moscow also took part in the Russian Cup and also the Europa League. Lokomotiv also contested the Russian Super Cup. Lokomotiv's farm club was relaunched as Kazanka and participated in the Russian Professional Football League, the third highest division in the Russian football league system.

== Main Events ==
- Ilya Herkus announced the foundation of Lokomotiv-Kazanka. Lokomotiv-Kazanka, which will act as Lokomotiv's farm club, will participate in the Russian Professional Football League, the third level of Russian football. Lokomotiv-Kazanka will be formed on the current youth team and will play their home matches at Sapsan Arena under the tutelage of Denis Klyuyev. Lokomotiv-Kazanka was officially launched as Kazanka on 5 July 2017.
- On 5 August 2017, Lokomotiv announced that the stadium has been renamed to RZD Arena.

== First Team Squad ==
=== Information ===
Players and squad numbers last updated on 5 May 2018.
Note: Flags indicate national team as has been defined under FIFA eligibility rules. Players may hold more than one non-FIFA nationality.

No.	Name	Nationality	Position	Date of Birth (Age)	Signed from	Since
Goalkeepers
1	Guilherme	(Russia)	GK	12 December 1985 (age 39)	(Brazil) Atlético Paranaense	2007
30	Nikita Medvedev	(Russia)	GK	14 December 1994 (age 30)	Rostov	2017
41	Miroslav Lobantsev	(Russia)	GK	27 May 1995 (age 29)	Youth system	2011
77	Anton Kochenkov	(Russia)	GK	2 April 1987 (age 37)	Mordovia Saransk	2015
Defenders
5	Nemanja Pejčinović	(Serbia)	DF	4 November 1987 (age 37)	(France) Nice	2014
14	Vedran Ćorluka (captain)	(Croatia)	DF	5 February 1986 (age 39)	(England) Tottenham Hotspur	2012
17	Taras Mykhalyk	(Ukraine)	DF	28 October 1983 (age 41)	(Ukraine) Dynamo Kyiv	2013
28	Boris Rotenberg	(Finland)	DF	19 May 1986 (age 38)	Dynamo Moscow	2016
29	Vitaliy Denisov	(Uzbekistan)	DF	23 February 1987 (age 38)	(Ukraine) Dnipro Dnipropetrovsk	2013
33	Solomon Kvirkvelia	(Georgia (country))	DF	6 February 1992 (age 33)	Rubin Kazan	2017
Midfielders
4	Manuel Fernandes	(Portugal)	MF	5 February 1986 (age 39)	(Turkey) Beşiktaş	2014
8	Jefferson Farfán	(Peru)	MF	26 October 1984 (age 40)	(United Arab Emirates) Al Jazira	2017
11	Alan Kasaev	(Russia)	MF	8 April 1986 (age 38)	Dynamo Moscow	2014
18	Aleksandr Kolomeytsev	(Russia)	MF	21 February 1989 (age 36)	Amkar Perm	2015
20	Vladislav Ignatyev	(Russia)	MF	20 January 1987 (age 38)	Kuban Krasnodar	2016
21	Amir Natkho	(Russia)	MF	9 July 1996 (age 28)	Krasnodar	2017
23	Dmitri Tarasov	(Russia)	MF	18 March 1987 (age 38)	FC Moscow	2010
27	Igor Denisov	(Russia)	MF	17 May 1984 (age 40)	Dynamo Moscow	2016
31	Maciej Rybus	(Poland)	MF	19 August 1989 (age 35)	(France) Lyon	2017
36	Dmitri Barinov	(Russia)	MF	11 January 1996 (age 29)	Youth system	2013
59	Aleksei Miranchuk	(Russia)	MF	17 October 1995 (age 29)	Youth system	2012
60	Anton Miranchuk	(Russia)	MF	17 October 1995 (age 29)	Youth system	2012
Forwards
9	Ari	(Brazil)	FW	11 December 1985 (age 39)	Krasnodar	2017
13	Arshak Koryan	(Russia)	FW	17 June 1995 (age 29)	(Netherlands) Vitesse	2017
24	Eder	(Portugal)	FW	22 December 1987 (age 37)	(France) Lille	2017
57	Artyom Galadzhan	(Russia)	FW	22 May 1998 (age 26)	Youth system	2014
84	Mikhail Lysov	(Russia)	FW	29 January 1998 (age 27)	Youth system	2014
Left mid-season
3	Timofei Margasov	(Russia)	DF	12 June 1992 (age 32)	Krylia Sovetov Samara	2017

== Transfers ==
=== Arrivals ===
Permanent transfer
Name	Nationality	Position	From	Fee	Date	Source
Nikita Medvedev	(Russia)	GK	Rostov	Free transfer	14 June 2017	
Solomon Kvirkvelia	(Georgia (country))	DF	Rubin Kazan	Undisclosed (~ €2,500,000)	30 June 2017	
Igor Denisov	(Russia)	MF	Dynamo Moscow	Free transfer	1 July 2017	
Arshak Koryan	(Russia) (Armenia)	FW	(Netherlands) Vitesse	Free transfer	12 July 2017	
Maciej Rybus	(Poland)	MF	(France) Lyon	Undisclosed (~ €1,750,000)	19 July 2017	
In on loan
Name	Nationality	Position	From	Date	Until	Source
Ari	(Brazil)	FW	Krasnodar	17 June 2017	End of season	
Eder	(Portugal)	FW	(France) Lille	23 August 2017	End of season	

=== Departures ===
Permanent Transfer
Name	Nationality	Position	To	Fee	Date	Source
Petar Škuletić	(Serbia)	FW	(Turkey) Gençlerbirliği S.K.	Free transfer	13 May 2017	
Dmitri Loskov	(Russia)	MF	Retired		13 May 2017	
Ilya Abayev	(Russia)	GK	Rostov	Free transfer	31 May 2017	
Renat Yanbayev	(Russia)	DF	Krasnodar	Free transfer	5 June 2017	
Maicon	(Brazil)	FW	(Turkey) Antalyaspor	Free transfer	16 June 2017	
Roman Shishkin	(Russia)	DF	Krasnodar	Free transfer	3 July 2017	
Delvin N'Dinga	(Republic of the Congo)	MF	(Turkey) Sivasspor	Undisclosed (~ €200,000)	7 September 2017	
Out on loan
Name	Nationality	Position	Loan to	Date	Until	Source
Igor Portnyagin	(Russia)	FW	Ural Yekaterinburg	27 June 2017	15 June 2018	
Timofei Margasov	(Russia)	DF	Tosno	22 January 2018	15 June 2018	

== Friendlies ==
=== Pre-season ===
22 June 2017	Lokomotiv Moscow	1 – 1	(Slovenia) Rudar Velenje	Villach, Austria
18:30 MSK (UTC+3)	Fernandes 39' (pen.)	Summary	Markovskyy 82'	Stadium: Sportplatz SC Landskron

26 June 2017	Lokomotiv Moscow	10 – 0	(Slovenia) Ankaran	Villach, Austria
18:30 MSK (UTC+3)	Fernandes 4' 16'; Ari 30' 36' 56'; An. Miranchuk 49' 57'; Galadzhan 60' 63' 87'	Summary		Stadium: Sportplatz SC Landskron

30 June 2017	Lokomotiv Moscow	0 – 1	(Croatia) Rijeka	Villach, Austria
19:00 MSK (UTC+3)		Summary	Župarić 31'	Stadium: Sportplatz SC Landskron

=== Mid-season ===
5 September 2017	Lokomotiv Moscow	4 – 1	(Slovenia) Ankaran	Bad Kleinkirchheim, Austria
17:15 MSK (UTC+3)	Koryan 20'; Eder 27'; Fernandes 35'; Galanin 76'	Summary	Mihovil Klapan 52'	Stadium: Sportarena Bad Kleinkirchheim; Attendance: 50

18 January 2018	Lokomotiv Moscow	0 – 3	(Switzerland) Luzern	La Cala de Mijas, Spain
18:00 MSK (UTC+3)		Summary	Follonier 58' 68'; Demhasaj 85'	Stadium: Campo Hotel La Cala

23 January 2018	Lokomotiv Moscow	1 – 1	(China) Tianjin Quanjian	Marbella, Spain
18:00 MSK (UTC+3)	Farfán 39'	Summary	Dalun 52'	Stadium: Ciudad Deportiva La Dama de Noche

27 January 2018	Lokomotiv Moscow	3 – 3	(Sweden) Östersunds	Marbella, Spain
20:15 MSK (UTC+3)	Fernandes 17'; Miranchuk 41' 59'	Summary	Hopcutt 49'; Ghoddos 68' 80'	Stadium: Estadio Municipal de Marbella

2 February 2018	Lokomotiv Moscow	1 – 0	(Croatia) Osijek	Marbella, Spain
20:00 MSK (UTC+3)	Ari 3'	Summary		Stadium: Marbella Football Center

5 February 2018	Lokomotiv Moscow	1 – 1	(Sweden) Kalmar	Coín, Spain
16:00 MSK (UTC+3)	Farfán 69'	Summary	Nixon 2'	Stadium: Estadio Jose Burgos Quintana

9 February 2018	Lokomotiv Moscow	2 – 2	(Norway) Strømsgodset	Marbella, Spain
18:00 MSK (UTC+3)	Farfán 33'; Fernandes 80'	Summary	Jradi 5'; Abdellaoue 70'	Stadium: Marbella Football Center

10 February 2018	Lokomotiv Moscow	1 – 2	(Hungary) Ferencvárosi	La Línea de la Concepción, Spain
18:00 MSK (UTC+3)	Eder 61'	Summary	Koch 55'; Varga 58'	Stadium: Estadio Municipal de La Línea de la Concepción

26 February 2018	Lokomotiv Moscow	2 – 0	(Belarus) Shakhtyor Soligorsk	Antalya, Turkey
17:00 MSK (UTC+3)	Tarasov 38'; Laptsew 78' (o.g.)	Summary

== Competitions ==
=== Overview ===
Competition	Started round	Final round	First match	Last match	G	W	D	L	GF	GA	GD	Win %
Super Cup	Final		14 July 2017		1	0	0	1	1	2	-1	0.0%
Premier League	Winners		18 July 2017	12 May 2018	30	18	6	6	41	21	+20	60.0%
Russian Cup	Round of 32		21 September 2017		1	0	0	1	2	3	-1	0.0%
Europa League	Group Stage	Round of 16	14 September 2017	15 March 2018	10	5	2	3	14	14	0	50.0%
Total					42	23	8	11	58	40	18	54.8%

=== Russian Super Cup ===
14 July 2017	Spartak Moscow	2 – 1	Lokomotiv Moscow	Moscow
21:30 MSK (UTC+3)	L. Adriano (yellow card) 62', (goal) 101'; Yeshchenko (yellow card) 80'; Dzhikiya (yellow card) 95'; Promes 113'; Bocchetti (yellow card) 115'	Summary	Pejčinović (yellow card) 42'; Barinov (yellow card) 76'; Fernandes 116'	Stadium: Lokomotiv Stadium; Attendance: 24,444; Referee: Vladislav Bezborodov

=== Russian Premier League ===
==== League table ====
Pos	Team	Pld	W	D	L	GF	GA	GD	Pts	Qualification or relegation
1	Lokomotiv Moscow (C)	30	18	6	6	41	21	+20	60	Qualification for the Champions League group stage
2	CSKA Moscow	30	17	7	6	49	23	+26	58	Qualification for the Champions League group stage
3	Spartak Moscow	30	16	8	6	51	32	+19	56	Qualification for the Champions League third qualifying round
4	Krasnodar	30	16	6	8	46	30	+16	54	Qualification for the Europa League group stage (Note: Tosno qualified for the Europa League group stage by winning the 2017–18 Russian Cup. However, since they failed to obtain a UEFA licence, the spot awarded to the cup winners was passed to fourth-placed team, the spot awarded to the fourth-placed team was passed to fifth-placed team, and the spot awarded to the fifth-placed team was passed to sixth-placed team.)
5	Zenit Saint Petersburg	30	14	11	5	46	21	+25	53	Qualification for the Europa League third qualifying round

Updated to match(es) played on 13 May 2018. Source: Russian Premier League, Soccerway
Rules for classification: 1) Points; 2) Head-to-head points; 3) Head-to-head matches won; 4) Head-to-head goal difference; 5) Head-to-head goals scored; 6) Head-to-head away goals; 7) Matches won; 8) Goal difference; 9) Goals scored; 10) Away goals scored.
(C) Champions

==== Results by round ====
Round	1	2	3	4	5	6	7	8	9	10	11	12	13	14	15	16	17	18	19	20	21	22	23	24	25	26	27	28	29	30
Ground	H	A	H	H	A	H	A	H	A	H	A	H	A	H	A	H	A	A	H	A	H	A	H	H	H	A	H	A	H	A
Result	W	W	W	W	D	L	W	W	D	L	W	W	L	W	W	D	W	W	W	W	D	W	D	L	W	W	D	L	W	L
Position	6	1	1	2	2	3	2	2	2	3	2	2	2	1	1	1	1	1	1	1	1	1	1	1	1	1	1	1	1	1

Source: Russian Premier League
A = Away; H = Home; W = Win; D = Draw; L = Loss

==== Matches ====
18 July 2017 1	Lokomotiv Moscow	1 – 0	Arsenal Tula	Moscow
19:30 MSK (UTC+3)	Kvirkvelia 57'	Summary		Stadium: Lokomotiv Stadium; Attendance: 6,166; Referee: Aleksei Sukhoi

21 July 2017 2	CSKA Moscow	1 – 3	Lokomotiv Moscow	Moscow
19:30 MSK (UTC+3)	Vitinho 42'	Summary	Farfán 24'; Ari 66'; Tarasov 74'	Stadium: VEB Arena; Attendance: 14,500; Referee: Sergei Karasev

30 July 2017 3	Lokomotiv Moscow	1 – 0	Anzhi Makhachkala	Moscow
17:30 MSK (UTC+3)	Fernandes 81'	Summary		Stadium: Lokomotiv Stadium; Attendance: 7,603; Referee: Roman Galimov

5 August 2017 4	Lokomotiv Moscow	1 – 0	SKA-Khabarovsk	Moscow
20:00 MSK (UTC+3)	Miranchuk 75'	Summary		Stadium: RZD Arena; Attendance: 8,160; Referee: Sergey Lapochkin

9 August 2017 5	Rubin Kazan	1 – 1	Lokomotiv Moscow	Kazan
20:00 MSK (UTC+3)	Zhemaletdinov 63' (pen.)	Summary	Kvirkvelia 90+2'	Stadium: Kazan Arena; Attendance: 14,095; Referee: Aleksei Sukhoi

13 August 2017 6	Lokomotiv Moscow	0 – 2	Tosno	Moscow
17:30 MSK (UTC+3)		Summary	Kvirkvelia 51' (o.g.); Zabolotny 90+5'	Stadium: RZD Arena; Attendance: 8,009; Referee: Sergey Kulikov

19 August 2017 7	Spartak Moscow	3 – 4	Lokomotiv Moscow	Moscow
17:30 MSK (UTC+3)	Glushakov 30'; L. Adriano 43'; Promes 90+2'	Summary	Barinov 48'; Al. Miranchuk 69'; Kolomeytsev 83'; Fernandes 90+1'	Stadium: Otkrytiye Arena; Attendance: 33,027; Referee: Aleksei Eskov

26 August 2017 8	Lokomotiv Moscow	2 – 1	Ural Yekaterinburg	Moscow
20:00 MSK (UTC+3)	Farfán 21'; Al. Miranchuk 56'	Summary	Guilherme 32' (o.g.)	Stadium: RZD Arena; Attendance: 11,477; Referee: Vladimir Moskalyov

10 September 2017 9	Akhmat Grozny	1 – 1	Lokomotiv Moscow	Grozny
19:00 MSK (UTC+3)	Ravanelli 84'	Summary	Rodolfo 55' (o.g.)	Stadium: Akhmat-Arena; Attendance: 16,570; Referee: Vladislav Bezborodov

18 September 2017 10	Lokomotiv Moscow	0 – 1	Amkar Perm	Moscow
19:30 MSK (UTC+3)		Summary	Gashchenkov 1'	Stadium: RZD Arena; Attendance: 9,860; Referee: Kirill Levnikov

24 September 2017 11	Rostov	0 – 1	Lokomotiv Moscow	Rostov-on-Don
16:30 MSK (UTC+3)		Summary	Eder 90+3'	Stadium: Olimp-2; Attendance: 12,198; Referee: Roman Galimov

1 October 2017 12	Lokomotiv Moscow	3 – 0	Dynamo Moscow	Moscow
16:30 MSK (UTC+3)	Fernandes 23'; Eder 32'; Al. Miranchuk 58'	Summary		Stadium: RZD Arena; Attendance: 12,007; Referee: Sergei Karasev

15 October 2017 13	Ufa	1 – 0	Lokomotiv Moscow	Ufa
14:00 MSK (UTC+3)	Igboun 76'	Summary		Stadium: Neftyanik Stadium; Attendance: 6,123; Referee: Alexei Sukhoi

23 October 2017 14	Lokomotiv Moscow	2 – 0	Krasnodar	Moscow
19:30 MSK (UTC+3)	Al. Miranchuk 25'; Fernandes 85'	Summary		Stadium: RZD Arena; Attendance: 12,532; Referee: Sergey Lapochkin

29 October 2017 15	Zenit Saint Petersburg	0 – 3	Lokomotiv Moscow	Saint Petersburg
16:30 MSK (UTC+3)		Summary	Farfán 57' 69'; Al. Miranchuk 77'	Stadium: Krestovsky Stadium; Attendance: 45,829; Referee: Vitali Meshkov

5 November 2017 16	Lokomotiv Moscow	2 – 2	CSKA Moscow	Moscow
16:30 MSK (UTC+3)	An. Miranchuk 14'; Fernandes 87'	Summary	Vitinho 29'; Natkho 43'	Stadium: RZD Arena; Attendance: 19,015; Referee: Sergei Karasev

19 November 2017 17	Anzhi Makhachkala	0 – 1	Lokomotiv Moscow	Makhachkala
14:00 MSK (UTC+3)		Summary	Al. Miranchuk 43'	Stadium: Anzhi Arena; Attendance: 5,495; Referee: Alexei Sukhoi

27 November 2017 18	SKA-Khabarovsk	1 – 2	Lokomotiv Moscow	Khabarovsk
12:00 MSK (UTC+3)	Fedotov 17'	Summary	Cherevko 15' (o.g.); Farfán 90+3'	Stadium: Lenin Stadium; Attendance: 4,011; Referee: Roman Galimov

2 December 2017 19	Lokomotiv Moscow	1 – 0	Rubin Kazan	Moscow
16:30 MSK (UTC+3)	Farfán 87'	Summary		Stadium: RZD Arena; Attendance: 11,551; Referee: Sergey Lapochkin

11 December 2017 20	Tosno	1 – 3	Lokomotiv Moscow	Saint Petersburg
19:30 MSK (UTC+3)	Trujić 77'	Summary	Farfán 19' 73'; Eder 54'	Stadium: Petrovsky Stadium; Attendance: 6,108; Referee: Artem Chistyakov

4 March 2018 21	Lokomotiv Moscow	0 – 0	Spartak Moscow	Moscow
16:30 MSK (UTC+3)		Summary		Stadium: RZD Arena; Attendance: 24,750; Referee: Mikhail Vilkov

12 March 2018 22	Ural Yekaterinburg	0 – 2	Lokomotiv Moscow	Yekaterinburg
17:00 MSK (UTC+3)		Summary	An. Miranchuk 11'; Fernandes 15' (pen.)	Stadium: SKB-Bank Arena; Attendance: 5,500; Referee: Vladimir Moskalyov

18 April 2018 23	Lokomotiv Moscow	0 – 0	Akhmat Grozny	Moscow
19:30 MSK (UTC+3)		Summary		Stadium: RZD Arena; Attendance: 10,075; Referee: Vladimir Moskalyov

31 March 2018 24	Amkar Perm	2 – 1	Lokomotiv Moscow	Moscow
14:00 MSK (UTC+3)	Olanare 48' (pen.) 59'	Summary	Fernandes 16' (pen.)	Stadium: RZD Arena; Attendance: 8,837; Referee: Sergey Lapochkin

8 April 2018 25	Lokomotiv Moscow	1 – 0	Rostov	Moscow
16:30 MSK (UTC+3)	Farfán 47'	Summary		Stadium: RZD Arena; Attendance: 12,478; Referee: Evgeny Turbin

14 April 2018 26	Dynamo Moscow	0 – 4	Lokomotiv Moscow	Moscow
14:00 MSK (UTC+3)		Summary	An. Miranchuk 3' 72'; Farfán 42'; Tarasov 58'	Stadium: Arena Khimki; Attendance: 10,114; Referee: Aleksei Eskov

22 April 2018 27	Lokomotiv Moscow	0 – 0	Ufa	Moscow
19:00 MSK (UTC+3)		Summary		Stadium: RZD Arena; Attendance: 10,821; Referee: Roman Galimov

30 April 2018 28	Krasnodar	2 – 0	Lokomotiv Moscow	Krasnodar
19:00 MSK (UTC+3)	Smolov 67' (pen.) 68'	Summary		Stadium: Krasnodar Stadium; Attendance: 34,055; Referee: Mikhail Vilkov

5 May 2018 29	Lokomotiv Moscow	1 – 0	Zenit Saint Petersburg	Moscow
19:30 MSK (UTC+3)	Eder 87'	Summary		Stadium: RZD Arena; Attendance: 26,109; Referee: Sergey Ivanov

13 May 2018 30	Arsenal Tula	2 – 0	Lokomotiv Moscow	Tula
14:00 MSK (UTC+3)	Artem Dzyuba 29'; Kantemir Berkhamov 90+2'	Summary		Stadium: Arsenal Stadium; Attendance: 18,175; Referee: Evgeny Turbin

=== Russian Cup ===
21 September 2017 Round of 32	Kryliya Sovetov Samara	3 – 2	Lokomotiv Moscow	Samara
18:30 MSK (UTC+3)	Bashkirov (yellow card) 33', (goal) 51'; Pejčinović 84' (o.g.); Klenkin 108'; Konyukhov (yellow card) 115'	Summary	Mykhalyk 76', (yellow card) 103'; Tarasov (yellow card) 86'; Kvirkvelia 90+2'	Stadium: Metallurg Stadium; Attendance: 9,271; Referee: Artem Chistyakov

=== Europa League ===
Lokomotiv have qualified directly for the group stage of the 2017–18 UEFA Europa League after winning the 2017 Russian Cup Final.

==== Group stage ====
Pos	Team	Pld	W	D	L	GF	GA	GD	Pts	Qualification	LOM	KOB	SHE	ZLI
1	(Russia) Lokomotiv Moscow	6	3	2	1	9	4	+5	11	Advance to knockout phase	—	2–1	1–2	3–0
2	(Denmark) Copenhagen	6	2	3	1	7	3	+4	9 (Note: Head-to-head results: Sheriff Tiraspol 0–0 Copenhagen, Copenhagen 2–0 Sheriff Tiraspol.)	Advance to knockout phase	0–0	—	2–0	3–0
3	(Moldova) Sheriff Tiraspol	6	2	3	1	4	4	0	9		1–1	0–0	—	1–0
4	(Czech Republic) Fastav Zlín	6	0	2	4	1	10	−9	2		0–2	1–1	0–0	—

Source: UEFA
Rules for classification: Group stage tiebreakers
Notes:

14 September 2017 1	Copenhagen (Denmark)	0 – 0	(Russia) Lokomotiv Moscow	Copenhagen, Denmark
20:00 MSK (UTC+3)		Summary		Stadium: Parken Stadium; Attendance: 17,285; Referee: Hüseyin Göçek

28 September 2017 2	Lokomotiv Moscow (Russia)	3 – 0	(Czech Republic) Fastav Zlín	Moscow, Russia
22:05 MSK (UTC+3)	Fernandes 2' (pen.) 6' 17'	Summary		Stadium: RZD Arena; Attendance: 10,064; Referee: Simon Lee Evans

19 October 2017 3	Sheriff Tiraspol (Moldova)	1 – 1	(Russia) Lokomotiv Moscow	Tiraspol, Moldova
22:05 MSK (UTC+3)	Badibanga 31'	Summary	An. Miranchuk 17'	Stadium: Sheriff Stadium; Attendance: 12,500; Referee: István Vad

2 November 2017 4	Lokomotiv Moscow (Russia)	1 – 2	(Moldova) Sheriff Tiraspol	Moscow, Russia
21:00 MSK (UTC+3)	Farfán 26'	Summary	Badibanga 41'; Brezovec 58'	Stadium: RZD Arena; Attendance: 10,118; Referee: Sébastien Delferière

23 November 2017 5	Lokomotiv Moscow (Russia)	2 – 1	(Denmark) Copenhagen	Moscow, Russia
21:00 MSK (UTC+3)	Farfán 17' 51'	Summary	Verbič 31'	Stadium: RZD Arena; Attendance: 10,896; Referee: Xavier Estrada Fernández

7 December 2017 6	Fastav Zlín (Czech Republic)	0 – 2	(Russia) Lokomotiv Moscow	Olomouc, Czech Republic
21:00 MSK (UTC+3)		Summary	Al. Miranchuk 70'; Farfán 75'	Stadium: Andrův stadion Attendance: 4,682; Referee: Mete Kalkavan

==== Knockout phase ====
===== Round of 32 =====
15 February 2018 First leg	Nice (France)	2 – 3	(Russia) Lokomotiv Moscow	Nice, France
19:00 CET (UTC+01:00)	Mario Balotelli 4' 28' (pen.)	Summary	Fernandes 45' (pen.) 69' 77'	Stadium: Allianz Riviera; Attendance: 16,918; Referee: István Kovács (Romania)

22 February 2018 Second leg	Lokomotiv Moscow (Russia)	1 – 0 (4 – 2 agg.)	(France) Nice	Moscow, Russia
17:00 CET (UTC+01:00)	Denisov 30'	Summary		Stadium: RZD Arena; Attendance: 18,104; Referee: Pavel Královec (Czech Republic)

===== Round of 16 =====
8 March 2018 First leg	Atlético Madrid (Spain)	3 – 0	(Russia) Lokomotiv Moscow	Madrid, Spain
19:00 CET (UTC+01:00)	Saúl 22'; Costa 47'; Koke 90'	Summary		Stadium: Wanda Metropolitano; Attendance: 40,767; Referee: Jakob Kehlet (Denmark)

15 March 2018 Second leg	Lokomotiv Moscow (Russia)	1 – 5 (1 – 8 agg.)	(Spain) Atlético Madrid	Moscow, Russia
17:00 CET (UTC+01:00)	Rybus 20'	Summary	Correa 16'; Saúl 47'; Torres 65' (pen.) 70'; Griezmann 85'	Stadium: RZD Arena; Attendance: 22,041; Referee: Artur Dias (Portugal)

== Statistics ==
=== Squad statistics ===
As of 5 May 2018

No.	Pos	Nat	Player	Total		Russian Premier League		Russian Cup		Russian Super Cup		Europa League	
No.	Pos	Nat	Player	Apps	Goals	Apps	Goals	Apps	Goals	Apps	Goals	Apps	Goals
1	GK	(Russia) RUS	Guilherme	31	0	23	0	0	0	1	0	7	0
4	MF	(Portugal) POR	Manuel Fernandes	40	14	28	7	1	0	1	1	10	6
5	DF	(Serbia) SRB	Nemanja Pejčinović	35	0	23	0	1	0	1	0	10	0
8	FW	(Peru) PER	Jefferson Farfán	32	14	22	10	0	0	1	0	9	4
9	FW	(Brazil) BRA	Ari	10	1	7	1	0	0	1	0	2	0
11	MF	(Russia) RUS	Alan Kasaev	2	0	2	0	0	0	0	0	0	0
13	FW	(Russia) RUS	Arshak Koryan	3	0	3	0	0	0	0	0	0	0
14	DF	(Croatia) CRO	Vedran Ćorluka	8	0	6	0	0	0	0	0	2	0
17	DF	(Ukraine) UKR	Taras Mykhalyk	12	1	9	0	1	1	0	0	2	0
18	MF	(Russia) RUS	Aleksandr Kolomeytsev	29	1	19	1	1	0	1	0	8	0
20	DF	(Russia) RUS	Vladislav Ignatyev	34	0	24	0	0	0	1	0	9	0
23	MF	(Russia) RUS	Dmitri Tarasov	33	2	23	2	1	0	1	0	8	0
24	FW	(Portugal) POR	Eder	27	4	17	4	1	0	0	0	9	0
27	MF	(Russia) RUS	Igor Denisov	39	1	27	0	1	0	1	0	10	1
28	DF	(Finland) FIN	Boris Rotenberg	9	0	6	0	1	0	0	0	2	0
29	DF	(Uzbekistan) UZB	Vitaliy Denisov	10	0	8	0	0	0	0	0	2	0
30	GK	(Russia) RUS	Nikita Medvedev	2	0	0	0	1	0	0	0	1	0
31	DF	(Poland) POL	Maciej Rybus	26	1	19	0	1	0	0	0	6	1
33	DF	(Georgia (country)) GEO	Saba Kvirkvelia	40	3	28	2	1	1	1	0	10	0
36	DF	(Russia) RUS	Dmitri Barinov	18	1	15	1	0	0	1	0	2	0
57	FW	(Russia) RUS	Artyom Galadzhan	2	0	2	0	0	0	0	0	0	0
59	MF	(Russia) RUS	Aleksei Miranchuk	40	8	29	7	1	0	1	0	9	1
60	MF	(Russia) RUS	Anton Miranchuk	40	5	28	4	1	0	1	0	10	1
77	GK	(Russia) RUS	Anton Kochenkov	9	0	6	0	0	0	0	0	3	0
84	DF	(Russia) RUS	Mikhail Lysov	18	0	12	0	1	0	0	0	5	0

=== Goals record ===
As of 5 May 2018

Rank	No.	Nat.	Po.	Name	Russian PL	Russian Cup	Europa League	Russian Super Cup	Total
1	4	(Portugal)	CM	Manuel Fernandes	7	0	6	1	14
1	8	(Peru)	CF	Jefferson Farfán	10	0	4	0	14
3	59	(Russia)	AM	Aleksei Miranchuk	7	0	1	0	8
4	60	(Russia)	AM	Anton Miranchuk	4	0	1	0	5
5	24	(Portugal)	CF	Eder	4	0	0	0	4
6	33	(Georgia (country))	CB	Saba Kvirkvelia	2	1	0	0	3
7	23	(Russia)	CM	Dmitri Tarasov	2	0	0	0	2
8	9	(Brazil)	CF	Ari	1	0	0	0	1
8	17	(Ukraine)	CB	Taras Mykhalyk	0	1	0	0	1
8	18	(Russia)	AM	Aleksandr Kolomeytsev	1	0	0	0	1
8	27	(Russia)	CM	Igor Denisov	0	0	1	0	1
8	31	(Poland)	LB	Maciej Rybus	0	0	1	0	1
8	36	(Russia)	CB	Dmitri Barinov	1	0	0	0	1
Total					41	2	14	1	58
