= Lysov =

Lysov (feminine:Lysova) is a Russian surname. Notable people with the surname include:

- Aleksei Lysov (sledge hockey) (born 1976), Russian sledge hockey player
- Aleksey Lysov (footballer) (born 2005), Russian football player
- Ihor Lysov (born 1958), Ukrainian politician, M.P.
- Ioann Lysov, Russian name of Joann Lõssov (1921–2000), Soviet and Estonian basketball player
- Mikhail Lysov (1998), Russian football player
- Mikhalina Lysova (born 1992), Russian skier and biathlete
- Sergei Lysov (born 2004), Israeli wheelchair tennis player
- Sergey Viktorovich Lysov (born 1963), Soviet and Russian actor
- Tatyana Lysova (born 1968), Russian journalist and media manager
