= 2017 Russian Super Cup =

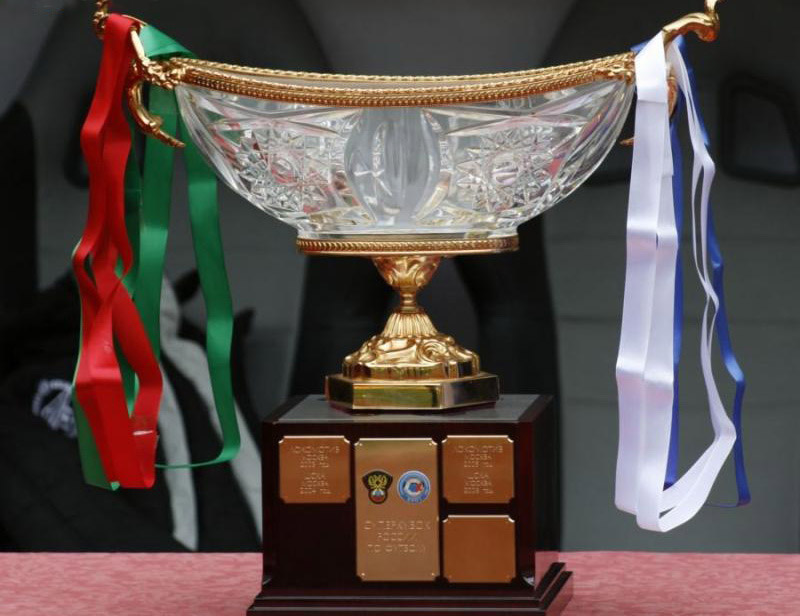
- Event: Russian Super Cup
Spartak Moscow	Lokomotiv Moscow
2	1
- After extra time
- Date: 14 July 2017
- Venue: RZD Arena, Moscow
- Referee: Vladislav Bezborodov
- Attendance: 24,444

The 2017 Russian Super Cup (Russian: Суперкубок России) was the 15th annual Russian Super Cup match which was contested between the 2016–17 Russian Premier League champion, Spartak Moscow, and the 2016–17 Russian Cup champion, Lokomotiv Moscow.

The match was held on 14 July 2017 at the RZD Arena, in Moscow and Spartak Moscow won in extra time.

== Match details ==
14 July 2017
21:30 MSK (UTC+3)

Spartak Moscow	2–1 (a.e.t.)	Lokomotiv Moscow
Luiz Adriano 101'; Promes 113'	Report	Fernandes 116'

RZD Arena, Moscow
Attendance: 24,444
Referee: Vladislav Bezborodov (St. Petersburg)

GK	32	(Russia) Artyom Rebrov
DF	38	(Russia) Andrey Yeshchenko	(yellow card) 80'
DF	23	(Russia) Dmitri Kombarov
DF	16	(Italy) Salvatore Bocchetti	(yellow card) 115'
DF	14	(Russia) Georgi Dzhikiya	(yellow card) 95'
MF	8	(Russia) Denis Glushakov (c)
MF	71	(Bulgaria) Ivelin Popov	(substituted off) 71'
MF	10	(Netherlands) Quincy Promes
MF	11	(Brazil) Fernando
FW	9	(Cape Verde) Zé Luís	(substituted off) 91'
FW	12	(Brazil) Luiz Adriano	(yellow card) 62'
Substitutes:
GK	57	(Russia) Aleksandr Selikhov
DF	29	(Russia) Ilya Kutepov
DF	17	(Russia) Georgi Tigiyev
DF	22	(Russia) Konstantin Shcherbakov
DF	3	(Serbia) Marko Petković
MF	7	(Georgia (country)) Jano Ananidze	(substituted in) 71'
MF	21	(Russia) Artyom Samsonov
MF	20	(Russia) Igor Leontyev
MF	18	(Russia) Zelimkhan Bakayev
MF	25	(Paraguay) Lorenzo Melgarejo	(substituted in) 91'
FW	69	(Russia) Denis Davydov
FW	66	(Liberia) Sylvanus Nimely
Manager:
(Italy) Massimo Carrera

GK	1	(Russia) Guilherme
DF	33	(Georgia (country)) Solomon Kvirkvelia
DF	5	(Serbia) Nemanja Pejčinović	(yellow card) 43'
MF	27	(Russia) Igor Denisov (c)	(substituted off) 111'
MF	23	(Russia) Dmitri Tarasov	(substituted off) 101'
MF	20	(Russia) Vladislav Ignatyev
DF	36	(Russia) Dmitri Barinov	(yellow card) 77'
MF	59	(Russia) Aleksei Miranchuk
MF	4	(Portugal) Manuel Fernandes
MF	8	(Peru) Jefferson Farfán
FW	9	(Brazil) Ari
Substitutes:
GK	77	(Russia) Anton Kochenkov
GK	30	(Russia) Nikita Medvedev
DF	28	(Finland) Boris Rotenberg
DF	34	(Russia) Timofei Margasov
DF	17	(Ukraine) Taras Mykhalyk
DF	42	(Russia) Ivan Lapshov
MF	11	(Russia) Alan Kasaev
MF	18	(Russia) Aleksandr Kolomeytsev	(substituted in) 111'
MF	60	(Russia) Anton Miranchuk	(substituted in) 101'
MF	13	(Russia) Arshak Koryan
FW	84	(Russia) Mikhail Lysov
FW	57	(Russia) Artyom Galadzhan
Manager:
(Russia) Yuri Semin

Assistant referees: Maksim Gavrilin (Vladimir), Dmitri Mosyakin (Moscow), Kirill Levnikov (St. Petersburg), Aleksey Sukhoy (Lyubertsy)

Sixth official: Anton Averyanov (Moscow)
