= Jefferson Farfán =

Peruvian footballer (born 1984)

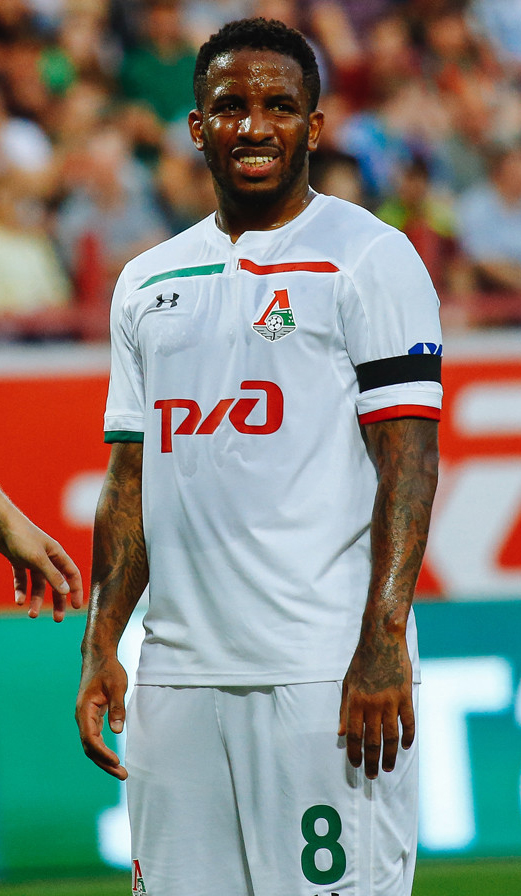
- Farfán playing for Lokomotiv Moscow in 2018

Personal information
- Full name: Jefferson Agustín Farfán Guadalupe
- Date of birth: 26 October 1984 (age 42)
- Place of birth: Lima, Peru
- Height: 1.77 m (5 ft 10 in)
- Position: Winger

Youth career
- 1993–1998: Deportivo Municipal
- 1998–2001: Alianza Lima

Senior career*
| Years | Team | Apps | (Gls) |
| 2001–2004 | Alianza Lima | 77 | (28) |
| 2004–2008 | PSV | 118 | (57) |
| 2008–2015 | Schalke 04 | 170 | (39) |
| 2015–2016 | Al-Jazira | 12 | (4) |
| 2017–2020 | Lokomotiv Moscow | 51 | (20) |
| 2021–2022 | Alianza Lima | 17 | (4) |
| Total | | 445 | (152) |

International career
| 2000–2001 | Peru U17 | 22 | (20) |
| 2001 | Peru U18 | 4 | (3) |
| 2002–2003 | Peru U20 | 7 | (1) |
| 2003–2004 | Peru U23 | 5 | (0) |
| 2003–2021 | Peru | 102 | (27) |
Medal record
Men's football
Representing Peru
Bolivarian Games
| Gold medal – first place | 2001 Ambato | Team |
Copa América
| Runner-up | 2019 Brazil |
| Third place | 2015 Chile |
- * Club domestic league appearances and goals

Jefferson Agustín Farfán Guadalupe (Spanish pronunciation: [ˈɟʝefeɾsoɱ faɾˈfan]; born 26 October 1984) is a Peruvian former professional footballer who mainly played as a winger. Commonly known as Farfán or the nickname Foquita (Spanish for Little Seal), he is known for his speed and technical ability and was one of the best providers of assists during his time in the Bundesliga.

Farfán began his career with Deportivo Municipal and Alianza Lima; the latter club saw him make his professional debut in 2001. In 2002, Farfán was highlighted as one of the next best players of Peruvian football and a year later, won his second Primera División title. After winning his third league title with Alianza in 2004, he was recognized as the best Peruvian player of that year.

Having joined PSV Eindhoven in mid-2004, Farfán helped the Dutch giants win four Eredivisie titles. He signed for Bundesliga side Schalke 04 in 2008 and during his time with the club, he won the 2011 DFB-Pokal Final. In 2012, he was named the most expensive Latin American player in the league. Farfán briefly played for Al-Jazira in the United Arab Emirates before leaving due to a breach of contract. He last played in Russia for Lokomotiv, when, in his second season, helped the club win their first league title in 14 years and finished as the team's top scorer.

With the national team, Farfán is the country's second top goalscorer, behind only Paolo Guerrero. He is very popular in Peru, with coach Ricardo Gareca naming him "one of the most important players in the history of Peruvian football." He helped his side finish third at the 2015 Copa América and second in Brazil 2019.

== Club career ==
=== Alianza Lima ===
Farfán began his professional career with Alianza Lima of Peru. He made some appearances in 2001 on the first-team, and began to break through in 2002, and impacting Alianza with its 2003 Peru championship. In his final season with the club in 2004, Farfán scored 14 goals, helping the club to another Peru championship.

=== PSV Eindhoven ===
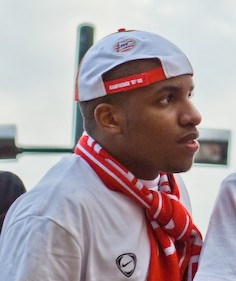
Jefferson Farfán with PSV in 2005

Following that season he was purchased by Dutch club PSV Eindhoven after being scouted by Guus Hiddink, for a reported 2 million Euro transfer fee. Farfán made his debut in the Eredivisie on 14 August in a 5–2 win against RBC Roosendal. Almost two weeks later, Farfán's European debut would come in the third qualifying round of the Champions League, a 5–0 win against Red Star Belgrade. PSV qualified for the final tournament and he played in all twelve games. In the group match against the Norwegian Rosenborg BK, he scored his inaugural European goal in 2–1 win. A month earlier, he had scored his first league goal, in a 4–0 win against SC Heerenveen. With PSV, Farfán won both the league and the cup tournament in his first season in the Netherlands. The Eredivisie would be won by PSV in the following three consecutive seasons. In the 2005/06 season, Farfán finished with 21 goals as club top scorer and fourth top scorer in the league. In his last season with PSV, Farfán was less dominant, partly due to an ankle injury he sustained during the 2007 Copa América. In March 2008, rumors began to circulate about a departure from Eindhoven.

In mid-2008, after winning the fourth championship with PSV, the Dutch team reached an agreement with Schalke 04 to sell him, a deal that amounted to approximately 17 million euros.

=== FC Schalke 04 ===
On 5 June 2008, it was reported that PSV had reached an agreement with German side Schalke 04 over the transfer of Farfán for around €10 million. On 10 June 2008, the club officially confirmed the transfer of Farfán on a four-year contract.

In March 2011, he scored twice against Valencia in the 2010–11 UEFA Champions League, helping Schalke 04 reach the quarter-finals. The goal that he himself considers as one of the best of his career, and which earned him the nickname "cohete" (rocket), took place in a match against Bayer Leverkusen, on 23 October 2011. In the 82nd minute he stole the ball near the Schalke area and ran at high speed almost the entire field to then define with his right foot. The German press surrendered to this goal, describing him as a "super sprinter" for his 80-meter run in 10 seconds.

On 28 April 2012, Schalke announced that Farfán had signed a contract extension, which would keep him at S04 until 30 June 2016.

=== Al Jazira Club ===
On 20 July 2015, after seven years at the club, Schalke confirmed that Farfán had joined Al Jazira Club of the United Arab Emirates for a reported fee of €6 million on a three-year deal, where he could earn up to €10 million a year.

Farfán left the club on 19 October 2016, because the club did not respect all the clauses in his contract.

=== Lokomotiv Moscow ===
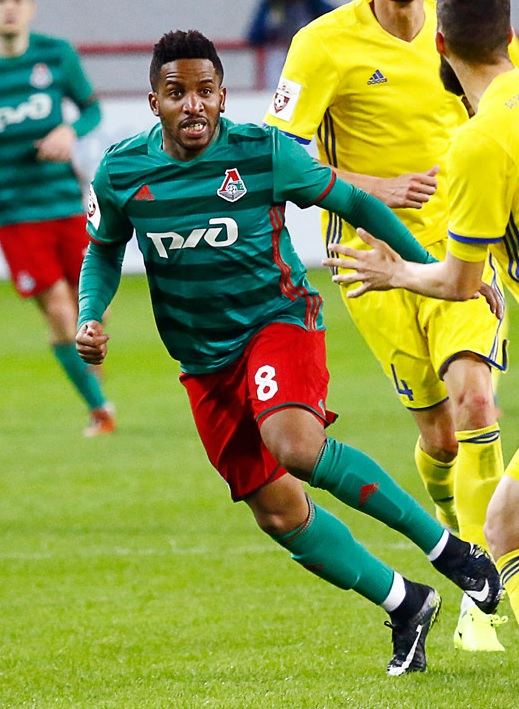
Jefferson Farfán with Lokomotiv Moscow against FC Rostov in 2017

On 28 January 2017, he signed with the Russian Premier League side FC Lokomotiv Moscow. The Russian team announced his signing after an irregular 2016, where he even was inactive for a hundred days after finishing in October 2016 a millionaire contract with Al Jazira. After 6 months of recovery, Farfán had a good season making goals that allowed his team to get the national title after 14 years, becoming the third top goalscorer of the season with 10 goals and 4 assists.

He didn't appear for Lokomotiv for 14 months from May 2019 due to knee injury and a following positive test for COVID-19. He made his first appearance upon recovery on 12 July 2020 in a game against FC Ufa and scored a late equalizer for his club in a 1–1 draw.

On 5 August 2020, Lokomotiv announced that Farfán left the club as his contract expired.

=== Alianza Lima ===
On 22 March 2021, Farfán signed with and returned to Alianza Lima after 17 years. He made his debut on 6 April against Deportivo Municipal and scoring a goal, ending the game 1-0 in favor of Alianza. Farfán would be key to Alianza Lima, winning the First Division in 2021 and 2022.

On 16 December 2022, Farfán announced his retirement at the age of 38.

== International career ==
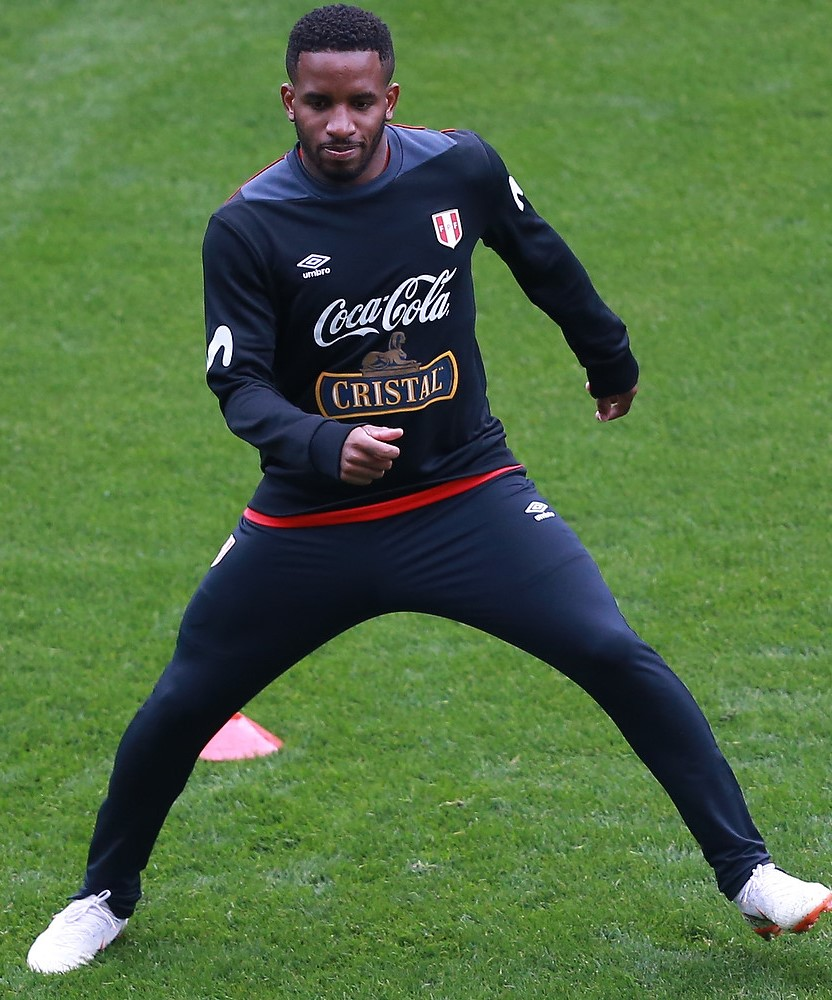
Farfán training with Peru at the 2018 FIFA World Cup.

Farfán made his debut for the Peru national football team in February 2003. He gained 102 caps and is second on the nation's career goalscoring list with 27 goals. He ended the South American 2006 World Cup qualifiers as the second top scorer, with seven goals.

He was suspended for 18 months from representing the national football team of Peru. But on 3 July 2008, after an investigation and a review of the facts, the suspension was changed to three months (from the date of appeal in April 2008) and $10,000. Farfán scored the winning goal in the World Cup qualifier at home to Chile on 23 March 2013.

He was a member of the Peru national football team that finished in third place at the 2015 Copa América. Farfán has been a key performer for Peru during the 2018 World Cup qualifiers where he scored 3 goals. He scored 2 goals in a 3–4 home loss to Chile and the winner in a 1–0 home win over Paraguay. He scored one of two goals in a 2–0 home win against New Zealand that led Peru qualify to the 2018 FIFA World Cup after a 36-year absence.

In June 2018 he was named in Peru's final 23-man squad for the 2018 FIFA World Cup in Russia. He started in their first group game against Denmark, which resulted in a 0–1 loss. Farfán started as a substitute in their second group game against France, coming on in the 46th minute to replace Yoshimar Yotún. His side were eliminated from the competition after another 0–1 loss. He missed their final group game against Australia as he was rushed to hospital after a suffering a concussion in training. Peru won their final game 2–0.

In Peru's second game of the 2019 Copa América, Farfán scored a goal in Peru's 3-1 victory over Bolivia. Farfán suffered an injury to his left knee prior to Peru's last-eight clash against Uruguay, ruling him out of the rest of the tournament. The Peruvian Football Federation (FPF) confirmed the injury, with Farfán expected to be sidelined for 6 to 9 months. On 6 July 2019, Farfán underwent knee surgery in Barcelona, just hours before his team faced hosts Brazil in the 2019 Copa América Final. Peru went on to lose the game 3–1 in his absence.

== Playing style ==
Farfán is considered to be a fast and technically gifted forward or winger, and is regarded less as a goal-scorer, but instead as more of an assist provider and as a creator of goals. His one-on-one dribbling ability, accurate corner kicks and passes contributed heavily to Schalke's goals, especially in the international arena. Farfán is also known for his penalty kick and direct or indirect free kick ability.

== Career statistics ==
=== Club ===
As of 14 November 2022

Appearances and goals by club, season and competition
| Club | Season | League | | | National cup (Note: Includes KNVB Cup, DFB-Pokal, UAE President's Cup, Russian Cup) | | Continental | | Other | | Total | |
| Club | Season | Division | Apps | Goals | Apps | Goals | Apps | Goals | Apps | Goals | Apps | Goals |
|---|---|---|---|---|---|---|---|---|---|---|---|---|
| Alianza Lima | Primera División | 2001 | 1 | 0 | — | | 0 | 0 | — | | 1 | 0 |
| Alianza Lima | Primera División | 2002 | 24 | 2 | — | | 3 | 1 | — | | 27 | 3 |
| Alianza Lima | Primera División | 2003 | 33 | 12 | — | | 8 | 0 | — | | 41 | 12 |
| Alianza Lima | Primera División | 2004 | 19 | 14 | — | | 5 | 4 | — | | 24 | 18 |
| Alianza Lima | Total | | 77 | 28 | — | | 16 | 5 | — | | 93 | 33 |
| PSV | Eredivisie | 2004–05 | 28 | 8 | 4 | 0 | 13 (Note: Appearances in UEFA Champions League) | 1 | — | | 45 | 9 |
| PSV | Eredivisie | 2005–06 | 31 | 21 | 4 | 3 | 8 | 2 | 1 (Note: Appearance in Johan Cruyff Shield) | 0 | 44 | 26 |
| PSV | Eredivisie | 2006–07 | 30 | 21 | 3 | 2 | 8 | 0 | 1 | 0 | 42 | 23 |
| PSV | Eredivisie | 2007–08 | 29 | 7 | 1 | 0 | 9 | 2 | 0 | 0 | 39 | 9 |
| PSV | Total | | 118 | 57 | 12 | 5 | 38 | 5 | 2 | 0 | 170 | 67 |
| Schalke 04 | Bundesliga | 2008–09 | 31 | 9 | 4 | 3 | 6 | 0 | — | | 41 | 12 |
| Schalke 04 | Bundesliga | 2009–10 | 33 | 8 | 3 | 0 | — | | — | | 36 | 8 |
| Schalke 04 | Bundesliga | 2010–11 | 28 | 3 | 7 | 3 | 10 | 4 | 1 (Note: Appearance in DFL-Supercup) | 0 | 45 | 10 |
| Schalke 04 | Bundesliga | 2011–12 | 23 | 4 | 1 | 0 | 10 (Note: Appearances in UEFA Europa League) | 0 | 0 | 0 | 34 | 4 |
| Schalke 04 | Bundesliga | 2012–13 | 27 | 6 | 1 | 0 | 7 | 1 | — | | 35 | 7 |
| Schalke 04 | Bundesliga | 2013–14 | 19 | 9 | 2 | 2 | 7 | 1 | — | | 28 | 12 |
| Schalke 04 | Bundesliga | 2014–15 | 9 | 0 | 0 | 0 | 0 | 0 | — | | 9 | 0 |
| Schalke 04 | Total | | 170 | 39 | 17 | 8 | 40 | 6 | 1 | 0 | 228 | 53 |
| Al Jazira | UAE Pro League | 2015–16 | 9 | 2 | 2 | 0 | 0 | 0 | — | | 11 | 2 |
| Al Jazira | UAE Pro League | 2016–17 | 3 | 2 | 3 | 1 | 0 | 0 | 1 (Note: Appearance in UAE Super Cup) | 0 | 7 | 3 |
| Al Jazira | Total | | 12 | 4 | 5 | 1 | 0 | 0 | 1 | 0 | 18 | 5 |
| Lokomotiv Moscow | Russian Premier League | 2016–17 | 6 | 1 | 2 | 0 | — | | — | | 8 | 1 |
| Lokomotiv Moscow | Russian Premier League | 2017–18 | 22 | 10 | 0 | 0 | 9 | 4 | 1 (Note: Appearance in Russian Super Cup) | 0 | 32 | 14 |
| Lokomotiv Moscow | Russian Premier League | 2018–19 | 20 | 8 | 1 | 0 | 4 | 1 | 1 | 0 | 26 | 9 |
| Lokomotiv Moscow | Russian Premier League | 2019–20 | 3 | 1 | 0 | 0 | 0 | 0 | 0 | 0 | 3 | 1 |
| Lokomotiv Moscow | Total | | 51 | 20 | 3 | 0 | 13 | 5 | 2 | 0 | 69 | 25 |
| Alianza Lima | Primera División | 2021 | 14 | 4 | — | | — | | — | | 14 | 4 |
| Alianza Lima | Primera División | 2022 | 3 | 0 | — | | 0 | 0 | — | | 3 | 0 |
| Alianza Lima | Total | | 17 | 4 | — | | 0 | 0 | — | | 17 | 4 |
| Career total | | | 445 | 152 | 37 | 14 | 107 | 21 | 6 | 0 | 595 | 187 |

=== International ===
Appearances and goals by national team and year
| National team | Year | Apps | Goals |
|---|---|---|---|
| Peru | 2003 | 11 | 4 |
| Peru | 2004 | 12 | 3 |
| Peru | 2005 | 7 | 4 |
| Peru | 2006 | 2 | 0 |
| Peru | 2007 | 9 | 1 |
| Peru | 2010 | 4 | 0 |
| Peru | 2011 | 6 | 1 |
| Peru | 2012 | 6 | 2 |
| Peru | 2013 | 7 | 2 |
| Peru | 2015 | 10 | 5 |
| Peru | 2016 | 1 | 0 |
| Peru | 2017 | 4 | 1 |
| Peru | 2018 | 11 | 3 |
| Peru | 2019 | 5 | 1 |
| Peru | 2020 | 2 | 0 |
| Peru | 2021 | 5 | 0 |
| Total | | 102 | 27 |

Scores and results list Peru's goal tally first, score column indicates score after each Farfán goal.

List of international goals scored by Jefferson Farfán
| No. | Date | Venue | Opponent | Score | Result | Competition | Ref. |
|---|---|---|---|---|---|---|---|
| 1 | 23 February 2003 | Estadio Alejandro Villanueva, Lima, Peru | Haiti | 5–1 | 5–1 | Friendly | |
| 2 | 24 July 2003 | Estadio Nacional, Lima, Peru | Uruguay | 1–1 | 3–4 | Friendly | |
| 3 | 24 July 2003 | Estadio Nacional, Lima, Peru | Uruguay | 3–2 | 3–4 | Friendly | |
| 4 | 6 September 2003 | Estadio Nacional, Lima, Peru | Paraguay | 4–1 | 4–1 | 2006 FIFA World Cup qualification | |
| 5 | 1 June 2004 | Estadio Centenario, Montevideo, Uruguay | Uruguay | 3–0 | 3–1 | 2006 FIFA World Cup qualification | |
| 6 | 9 July 2004 | Estadio Monumental, Lima, Peru | Venezuela | 1–0 | 3–1 | 2004 Copa América | |
| 7 | 16 November 2004 | Estadio Nacional, Lima, Peru | Chile | 1–0 | 2–1 | 2006 FIFA World Cup qualification | |
| 8 | 30 March 2005 | Estadio Nacional, Lima, Peru | Ecuador | 2–2 | 2–2 | 2006 FIFA World Cup qualification | |
| 9 | 3 September 2005 | Estadio José Pachencho Romero, Maracaibo, Venezuela | Venezuela | 1–1 | 1–4 | 2006 FIFA World Cup qualification | |
| 10 | 11 October 2005 | Estadio Jorge Basadre, Tacna, Peru | Bolivia | 3–0 | 4–1 | 2006 FIFA World Cup qualification | |
| 11 | 11 October 2005 | Estadio Jorge Basadre, Tacna, Peru | Bolivia | 4–1 | 4–1 | 2006 FIFA World Cup qualification | |
| 12 | 3 June 2007 | Estadio Vicente Calderón, Madrid, Spain | Ecuador | 1–0 | 2–1 | Friendly | |
| 13 | 11 October 2011 | Estadio Monumental, Santiago, Chile | Chile | 2–3 | 2–4 | 2014 FIFA World Cup qualification | |
| 14 | 7 September 2012 | Estadio Nacional, Lima, Peru | Venezuela | 1–1 | 2–1 | 2014 FIFA World Cup qualification | |
| 15 | 7 September 2012 | Estadio Nacional, Lima, Peru | Venezuela | 2–1 | 2–1 | 2014 FIFA World Cup qualification | |
| 16 | 22 March 2013 | Estadio Nacional, Lima, Peru | Chile | 1–0 | 1–0 | 2014 FIFA World Cup qualification | |
| 17 | 6 September 2013 | Estadio Nacional, Lima, Peru | Uruguay | 1–2 | 1–2 | 2014 FIFA World Cup qualification | |
| 18 | 3 June 2015 | Estadio Nacional, Lima, Peru | Mexico | 1–0 | 1–1 | Friendly | |
| 19 | 8 September 2015 | Red Bull Arena, Harrison, United States | Colombia | 1–1 | 1–1 | Friendly | |
| 20 | 13 October 2015 | Estadio Monumental, Lima, Peru | Chile | 1–1 | 3–4 | 2018 FIFA World Cup qualification | |
| 21 | 13 October 2015 | Estadio Monumental, Lima, Peru | Chile | 2–1 | 3–4 | 2018 FIFA World Cup qualification | |
| 22 | 13 November 2015 | Estadio Nacional, Lima, Peru | Paraguay | 1–0 | 1–0 | 2018 FIFA World Cup qualification | |
| 23 | 15 November 2017 | Estadio Nacional, Lima, Peru | New Zealand | 1–0 | 2–0 | 2018 FIFA World Cup qualification | |
| 24 | 27 March 2018 | Red Bull Arena, Harrison, United States | Iceland | 3–1 | 3–1 | Friendly | |
| 25 | 29 May 2018 | Estadio Nacional, Lima, Peru | Scotland | 2–0 | 2–0 | Friendly | |
| 26 | 20 November 2018 | Estadio Monumental Virgen de Chapi, Arequipa, Peru | Costa Rica | 2–2 | 2–3 | Friendly | |
| 27 | 18 June 2019 | Estádio do Maracanã, Rio de Janeiro, Brazil | Bolivia | 2–1 | 3–1 | 2019 Copa América | |

== Honours ==
Alianza Lima

- Peruvian Primera División: 2001, 2003, 2004, 2021, 2022

PSV Eindhoven

- Eredivisie: 2004–05, 2005–06, 2006–07, 2007–08
- KNVB Cup: 2004–05; runner-up: 2005–06
- Johan Cruyff Shield runner-up: 2005, 2006

Schalke 04

- DFB-Pokal: 2010–11
- DFL-Supercup: 2011; runner-up: 2010

Al Jazira Club

- UAE President's Cup: 2015–16

Lokomotiv Moscow

- Russian Premier League: 2017–18
- Russian Cup: 2016–17, 2018–19
- Russian Super Cup runner-up: 2017, 2018

Peru U18

- Bolivarian Games: 2001

Peru

- Copa América runner-up: 2019; third place: 2015

== Personal life ==
Farfán has three children; two sons and one daughter. Having spent most of his career in Germany, he could speak German, though not fluently.

Despite his talents, he became widely known in the late 2000s for his indiscipline and controversial behavior. He was involved in three major national football team scandals in 2007, 2010, and 2019; the first two led to his suspension from the national team.

Farfán's cousin Quembol Guadalupe (born 2004) also became a professional footballer, playing as a defender for Sporting Cristal.

== See also ==
- List of men's footballers with 100 or more international caps
