= Aleksey Lysov (footballer) =

Russian footballer (born 2005)

Personal information
- Full name: Aleksey Pavlovich Lysov
- Date of birth: 10 February 2005 (age 21)
- Height: 1.85 m (6 ft 1 in)
- Position: Centre-back

Team information
- Current team: Krylia Sovetov Samara; Krylia Sovetov-2 Samara
- Number: 33

Youth career
- –2023: Lokomotiv Moscow
- 2023–2024: Krylia Sovetov Samara

Senior career*
Years	Team	Apps	(Gls)
2023–	Krylia Sovetov Samara	2	(0)
2024–	Krylia Sovetov-2 Samara	53	(0)

International career^{‡}
2019	Russia U15	2	(0)
2021	Russia U16	4	(1)
2022	Russia U18	3	(0)
- * Club domestic league appearances and goals as of 1 November 2026 ‡ National team caps and goals as of 17 November 2022

Aleksey Pavlovich Lysov (Russian: Алексей Павлович Лысов; born 10 February 2005) is a Russian football player who plays as a centre-back for Krylia Sovetov Samara and Krylia Sovetov-2 Samara.

== Career ==
Lysov is a product of Lokomotiv Moscow academy.

On 1 August 2023, Lysov signed a four-year contract with Russian Premier League club Krylia Sovetov Samara. He made his debut for Krylia Sovetov on 30 August 2023 in a Russian Cup game against Akhmat Grozny.

Lysov made his RPL debut for Krylia Sovetov on 30 November 2025 against Krasnodar.

== Personal life ==
His older brother Mikhail Lysov also played football professionally.

== Career statistics ==
As of 1 November 2026

Club	Season	League			Cup		Total	
Club	Season	Division	Apps	Goals	Apps	Goals	Apps	Goals
Krylia Sovetov Samara	2023–24	Russian Premier League	0	0	2	0	2	0
Krylia Sovetov Samara	2024–25	Russian Premier League	0	0	1	0	1	0
Krylia Sovetov Samara	2025–26	Russian Premier League	2	0	1	0	3	0
Krylia Sovetov Samara	Total		2	0	4	0	6	0
Krylia Sovetov-2 Samara	2024	Russian Second League B	21	0	–		21	0
Krylia Sovetov-2 Samara	2025	Russian Second League B	24	0	–		24	0
Krylia Sovetov-2 Samara	2026	Russian Second League B	8	0	–		8	0
Krylia Sovetov-2 Samara	Total		53	0	0	0	53	0
Career total			55	0	4	0	59	0
