= Tatyana Lysova =

Russian journalist and media manager

- Born: 18 March 1968; Moscow (Soviet Union)
- Education: MIREA – Russian Technological University
- Occupations: Journalist, media manager
- Employer: Alfa-Bank (2021–)

Tatyana Gennadievna Lysova (Note: Sometimes transcribed to English as Tatiana) (Russian: Татьяна Геннадьевна Лысова, born 18 March 1968) is a Russian journalist and media manager. Former editor-in-chief of the Vedomosti newspaper (2002—2007, 2010–2017) and former first deputy chief editor of the Meduza newspaper. Laureate of the 8th prize "Media Manager of Russia — 2008" (nomination "Print media. Newspapers").

== Biography ==
Tatyana Lysova was born on 18 March 1968 in Moscow, Soviet Union. In 1991 she graduated from the Moscow Institute of Radio Engineering, Electronics and Automation (specialty "Applied Mathematics").

After graduation, Lysova worked as a system programmer at a research and development centre for the defence industry. From 1994 to 1995 she was a correspondent for the Kommersant newspaper. From 1995 to 1999 she was the editor of the companies department of the Expert magazine.

Since 1999 she worked as the editor of the Energoresursy (Russian: Энергоресурсы) department of the Vedomosti newspaper. From January 2000 to December 2002 she held the position of deputy editor-in-chief, and then – first deputy editor-in-chief, from spring to December 2002 – chief editor, and from December 2002 to 2007 – editor-in-chief of Vedomosti.

Since April 2007 Tatyana was the editorial director and headed the development strategy of the company Business News Media, which published Vedomosti.

From March 2010 to May 2017 she was the editor-in-chief of Vedomosti. From April 2013 she was responsible for the website vedomosti.ru. She was one of the authors of the internal rules of Vedomosti, those rules as a textbook on journalism was studied by employees of dozens of Russian media outlets.

From January 2018 to December 2019 she worked as deputy chief editor of the Interfax political information service.

In January 2020, she became the first deputy chief editor of the Meduza newspaper. In August 2021, it became known that Lysova left Meduza and began working as the head of the investment editorial office of Alfa-Bank.
