= Quincy Promes =

Dutch footballer (born 1992)

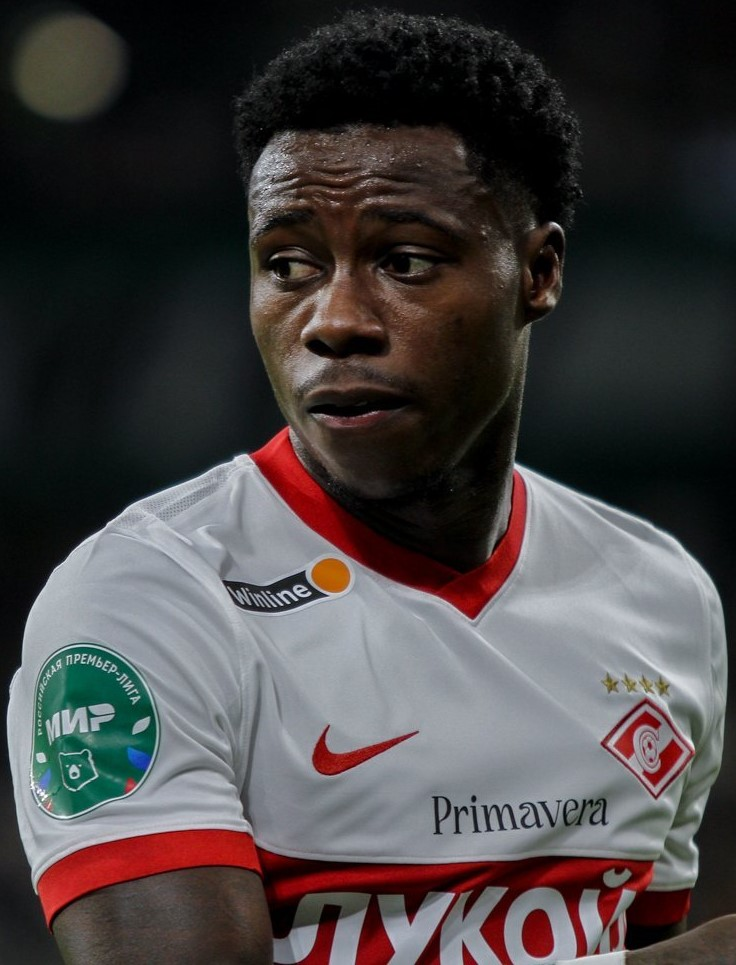
- Promes playing for Spartak Moscow in 2022

Personal information
- Full name: Quincy Anton Promes
- Date of birth: 4 January 1992 (age 34)
- Place of birth: Amsterdam, Netherlands
- Height: 1.74 m (5 ft 9 in)
- Positions: Winger; forward

Youth career
- RKSV DCG
- 2002–2008: Ajax
- 2008–2009: Haarlem
- 2009–2012: Twente

Senior career*
Years	Team	Apps	(Gls)
2011–2014	Twente	34	(11)
2012–2013	→ Go Ahead Eagles (loan)	32	(13)
2014–2018	Spartak Moscow	115	(59)
2018–2019	Sevilla	33	(2)
2019–2021	Ajax	39	(18)
2021–2024	Spartak Moscow	77	(35)
2024–2025	Dubai United	20	(19)
Total		350	(157)

International career^{‡}
2011	Netherlands U19	5	(0)
2012–2013	Netherlands U20	4	(1)
2013–2014	Netherlands U21	10	(7)
2014–2021	Netherlands	50	(7)
Medal record
Men's football
Representing Netherlands
UEFA Nations League
Runner-up	2019 Portugal
- * Club domestic league appearances and goals as of 30 May 2025 ‡ National team caps and goals as of 27 June 2021

Quincy Anton Promes (born 4 January 1992) is a Dutch former professional footballer who played as a winger or forward.

Promes started his career with Twente in 2011 where he spent three seasons before moving to Russian club Spartak Moscow in the summer of 2014. That year he also won his first senior cap for the Netherlands. Promes won his first major honor in 2017 as Spartak were crowned Russian Premier League (RPL) champions. He was named Footballer of the Year in Russia in 2017 and finished the 2017–18 season as RPL top scorer. In total, he amassed 135 appearances and scored 66 goals over his initial four-year stint with Spartak.

Promes signed for Spanish club Sevilla in 2018 for a reported €20 million but struggled for form there. In 2019, he signed for his boyhood club Ajax, where he regained form and was a key player, including during impressive performances in the UEFA Champions League. He played for the Netherlands at UEFA Euro 2020. Promes moved back to Spartak in 2021, and became the top scorer in Spartak's modern era two years later, as well as top foreign scorer in the history of RPL.

Promes has been subjected to criminal procedures during his career, and, as of June 2026, he is imprisoned while appealing convictions for aggravated assault and drug trafficking. His legal woes started in 2020, when he was detained over a stabbing incident, being subsequently found guilty of aggravated assault in 2023. Later that year, Promes was criminally charged for being involved in cocaine trafficking and found guilty in 2024. He continued playing football without restrictions until his 2024 arrest in the United Arab Emirates at the request of Dutch prosecutors. Soon after being released under the condition of remaining in the country, Promes joined Dubai United. On 20 June 2025, however, Promes was extradited to the Netherlands, ending his football career.

== Club career ==
=== FC Twente ===
Born in Amsterdam, Promes started out playing football at RKSV DCG before joining Ajax. However, he was released by them when he was 16, a moment he described as "worst days of my career. My world collapsed on that one day." He later stated his departure from the club was due to his bad behaviour, both on and off the pitch. After being kicked out of Ajax as well, Promes considered quitting football. He was persuaded by his mother to continue, leading him to sign for Haarlem. He then joined Twente in 2009, where he started his professional career.

After progressing through the academy, Promes signed his first professional contract with the club in February 2011. After being called up to the first team for the first time the following year, Promes made his Eredivisie debut with Twente on 11 April 2012, coming on as an 81st-minute substitute in a 2–2 draw with AZ Alkmaar. Then, on 3 May 2012, Promes signed a contract extension with the club, keeping him until 2015. Later in the 2011–12 season, Promes went on to make three appearances for the side.

==== Loan to Go Ahead Eagles ====
On 31 July 2012, Promes joined Eerste Divisie side Go Ahead Eagles on loan for the 2012–13 season. He said his decision to leave the club on loan was to help his development and hoped of getting first team football at his parent club.

Promes made his Go Ahead Eagles debut in the opening game of the season, where he came on as a second–half substitute, in a 2–0 win over Almere City. Two weeks later, on 24 August 2012, he scored his first goal, as well as, setting up two goals, in a 4–1 win over FC Oss. Since making his debut, Promes quickly established himself in the starting eleven at the club, where he managed to dispatch Joran Pot and Sjoerd Overgoor in the midfield position. Promes quickly became a fan favourite at Go Ahead Eagles and earned a nickname "Promessi".

After winning the Bronze Bulls' Jupiler League Award, Promes then scored in the third round of KNVB Cup, in a 3–0 win over De Graafschap, followed up by scoring in a 6–1 win over Excelsior. Promes then scored two goals in two matches between 30 November 2012 and 16 December 2012 against FC Emmen and FC Volendam. He did so again when he scored two goals in two matches between 18 February 2013 and 22 February 2013 against FC Oss and Helmond Sport. Promes later scored twice on 18 March 2013, in a 4–1 win over Excelsior, followed up by scoring, in a 3–2 win over Sparta Rotterdam. Promes was the third leading scorer for the club from Deventer with 13 goals, and was named the league's biggest talent at the end of the year.

During the promotion playoffs, Promes scored a brace against FC Dordrecht in the return leg at De Adelaarshorst, advancing them to the second round 6–3 on aggregate after drawing the first leg. He then scored again on 19 May 2013 in the second leg semi-final, with a 3–0 win over VVV-Venlo. The club would eventually earn promotion, returning to the Eredivisie for the first time in 18 years.

=== Return to Twente ===
After his loan spell at Go Ahead Eagles ended at the 2012–13 season, Promes returned to his parent club. He made his first appearance for Twente in a year, starting the whole game, in a 0–0 draw against RKC Waalwijk in the opening game of the season. Two weeks later, on 18 August 2013, Promes scored his first goals in the Eredivisie, in a 6–0 win over FC Utrecht. Since then, he established himself in the starting eleven at the club.

Promes then went on a goalscoring spree between 2 November 2013 and 29 November 2013 against NEC, PEC Zwolle, NAC Breda (twice) and Roda JC. However, Promes suffered a knee injury after colliding with keeper Filip Kurto during a 2–1 win over Roda JC on 29 November 2013. After an operation, it was announced that he would be out for the rest of 2013; up until that point, he had started every match since the opening game of the season. Despite this, his form was even resulted in him being named the best player in the league in the first half of the season.

After returning to training in the winter break, Promes scored on his return from injury, in a 3–1 win over Heracles Almelo on 17 January 2014. He later added two more goals later in the season against PSV Eindhoven and Utrecht. Halfway through the 2013–14 season, the club began negotiation with Promes over a new contract. It wasn't until on 20 March 2014 that he signed a contract extension, keeping him until 2017. Despite suffering another injury during the 2013–14 season, Promes finished the season, making 31 appearances and scoring 11 times in all competitions.

Ahead of the 2014–15 season, Promes was linked a move away from Twente, as clubs, such as, Juventus and Valencia amongst interested. After departing Twente for Russia, Promes was given a farewell sendoff for the FC Twente match against Feyenoord on 29 August 2014.

=== Spartak Moscow ===
==== 2014–15 season ====
On 8 August 2014, Promes transferred to Russian club Spartak Moscow for a fee reported to be €15 million. As part of the move, the club received €11.5 million as compensation. Furthermore, should Promes' performances exceed expectations at the club, both Go Ahead Eagles and FC Twente would receive a payment. Upon joining the club, Promes was given the number 24 shirt. He also became the second Quincy in the club's history as his also Amsterdam-born compatriot Quincy Owusu-Abeyie played for the club between 2006 and 2009.

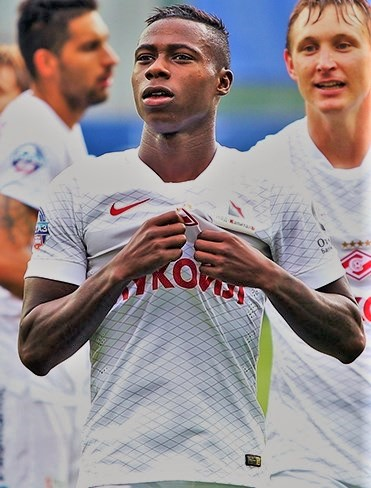
Promes playing for Spartak Moscow in August 2014

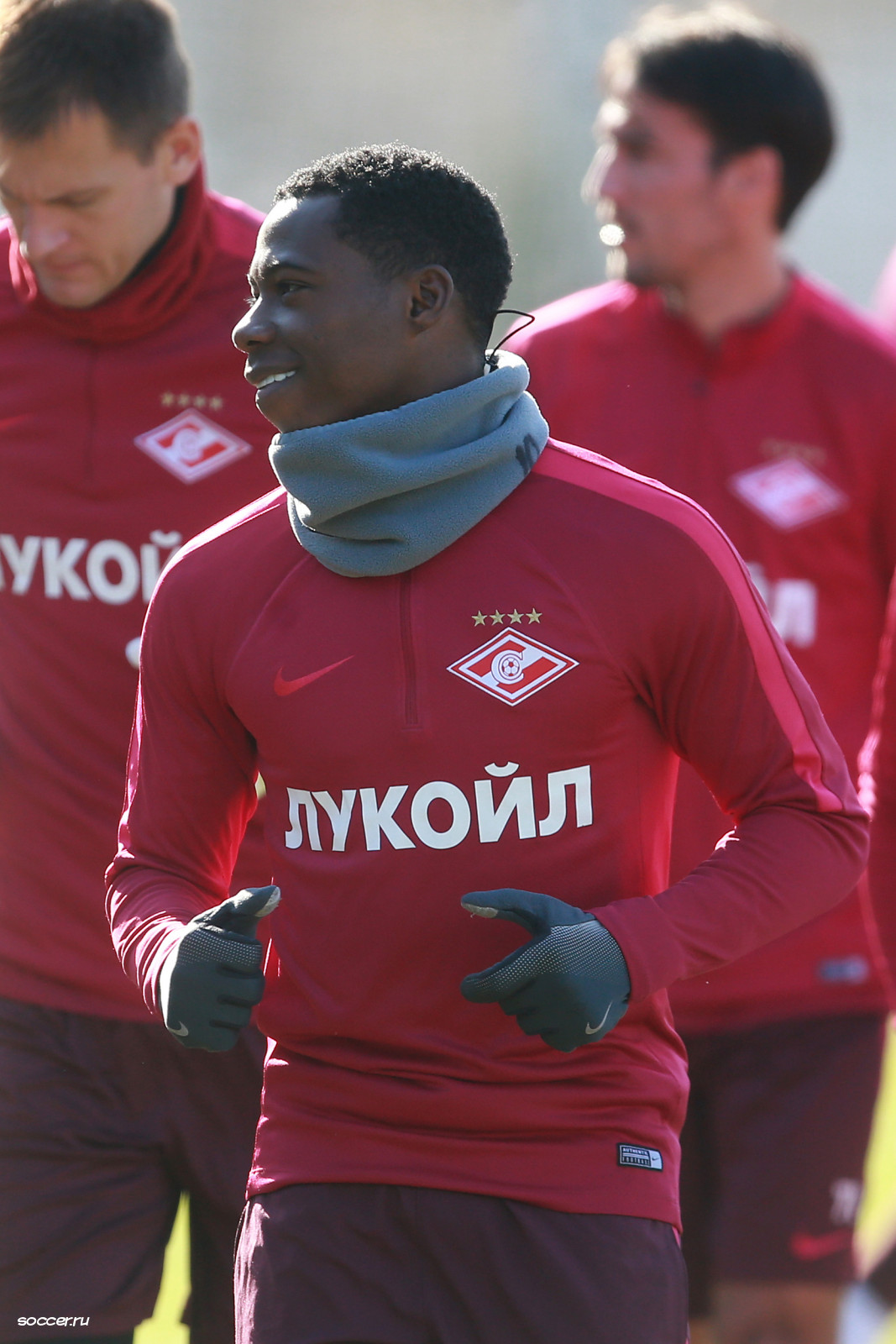
Promes training with the squad in March 2017

Promes made his Spartak Moscow debut, where he started the whole game, in a 4–0 loss against Krasnodar on 14 August 2014. After making his debut for the club, he quickly settled in Russia, stating the league suited him and how he had adapted to the unusual conditions he faced. Promes scored his first goals on 14 September 2014, in a 3–1 win over Torpedo Moscow. He also formed a partnership with Roman Shirokov in a 4–3–3 formation under the management of Murat Yakin. He had to wait for two months to find the back of the net again when he scored against Arsenal Tula and followed up by scoring twice against Mordovia Saransk two weeks later. His performance resulted in him being named as November's Player of the Month. Promes later scored twice on 18 April 2015, in a 3–1 win over Mordovia Saransk. This was followed by scoring in a 1–0 win over Rubin Kazan. As a result, he was named April's Player of the Month. In the last five remaining matches towards the end of the season, Promes also scored three more goals: once against Terek Grozny and twice against Amkar Perm. In his first season at Spartak Moscow, Promes made a total of 29 appearances and scored 13 times in all competitions, making him the club's top scorer that season. Reflecting on his first season, Yakin and Russian media agreed that Promes was the club's best signing during the 2014–15 season. Promes was also awarded the Golden Boar for the first time.

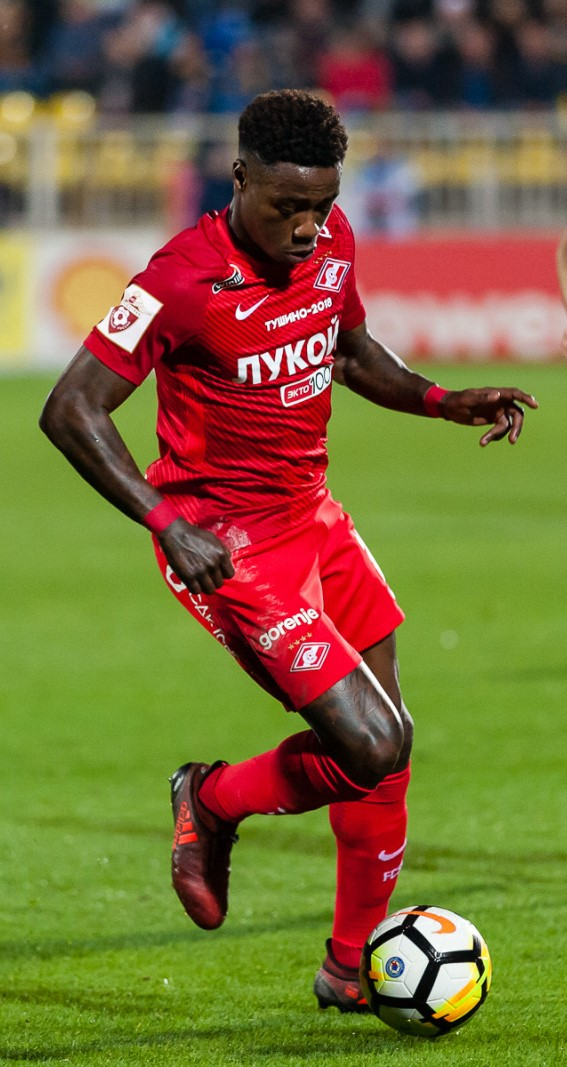
Promes dribbling during a match against Rostov in November 2017

==== 2015–16 season ====
Ahead of the 2015–16 season, Promes insisted on staying at the club after being linked with a move away from Spartak throughout the summer. He scored his first goals of the season, in a 2–0 victory over Krylia Sovetov Samara on 9 August 2015. Under the new management of Dmitri Alenichev, Promes began playing attacking football, playing in 5-3-2 or 3-5-2 tactics and facing competition from Yura Movsisyan and Zé Luís. Two weeks later, on 22 August, Promes scored another brace for the second time that season, in a 3–1 win over Amkar Perm. As a result, Promes was named August's Player of the Month. He then played a vital role when he scored the only goal of a 1–0 triumph over FC Rostov on 13 September 2015. Promes was awarded again when he won September's Player of the Month. On 25 October, in the derby against Dynamo Moscow, Promes scored twice in a 3–2 win. After being awarded the Player of the Month for October and November, Promes scored the quickest goal of the season, taking his tally to 10 goals, in a 1–0 win over Krylia Sovetov Samara on 4 December. Despite more rumours of a move away in January, he stayed at the club. However, he later hinted that he could not guarantee his stay at Spartak Moscow on a long-term basis. Towards the end of the season, Promes switched his shirt number from 24 to 10 following the departure of Movsisyan. He added eight more goals later in the season, including a brace against Dynamo Moscow, and goals against Ural Yekaterinburg and Terek Grozny. Despite suffering injuries during the 2015–16 season, Promes managed a total of 32 appearances with his tally of 18 goals in all competitions making him the club's top scorer for the second time. At the end of the season, Promes was also awarded the Golden Boar for the second season running.

==== 2016–17 season ====
Prior to the start of the 2016–17 season, Promes said that he wanted to stay with Spartak despite continued interest from other clubs, with Serie A side Inter Milan one of the clubs being linked with the Dutchman. By the end of August, Promes ended the transfer speculation by signing a new contract, keeping him at the club until 2021. He started the 2016–17 season well when he scored twice and also assisted one of the goals in a 4–0 win over Arsenal Tula in the opening game of the season. On 28 August 2016, the day after he signed his new contract, Promes scored his third goal of the season in a 2–0 win over Anzhi Makhachkala. Several weeks later, on 16 September, he scored twice for the second time that season, as well as setting up one of the goals, in a 3–1 success over FC Orenburg. Under the new management of Massimo Carrera, Promes continued to play in the attacking midfield position for the side. However, for the remainder of 2016 he suffered with injuries and was sent off for a second bookable offence in a 2–1 win over Rubin Kazan (during the match, he scored) on 5 December. By the end of the year, Promes finished in second place for Russian Player of the Year behind Fyodor Smolov. After suffering a one match suspension, Promes later scored four goals in four matches between 18 March 2017 and 16 April 2017 against Lokomotiv Moscow, Orenburg, FC Ufa and Zenit Saint Petersburg. Towards the end of the season, Promes helped the side win the league for the first time since 2001 after he scored the only goal of a 1–0 victory over Tom Tomsk on 6 May 2017; the club was confirmed champions shortly after. After the club had won the league, Promes scored one more goal which came against Terek Grozny on 17 May. Promes made 29 appearances and scored 12 goals in all competitions in 2016–17. For his performances, he was named the 2016–17 Player of the Season.

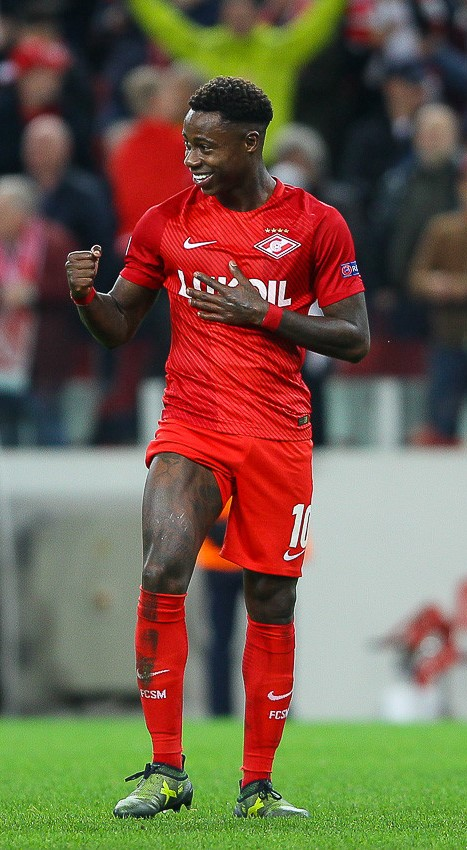
Promes celebrating after scoring one of the goals against Sevilla in the UEFA Champions League

==== 2017–18 season ====
Ahead of the 2017–18 season, Promes made it clear that he would not leave Spartak, stating: "So far there is no reason to leave." Amid the transfer speculation, Promes scored the winning goal in a 2–1 win over Lokomotiv Moscow in the Russia Super Cup. Four days later, he scored in the opening game of the season, and followed up with another goal in a 2–2 draw against Dynamo Moscow. At the start of the season, Promes scored five goals in eight appearances despite the club going through a poor run of form in the league. He scored on his 100th appearance for the club, in a 1–1 draw against Rubin Kazan on 9 September 2017. After the match, manager Massimo Carrera praised his performance, describing him as an "outstanding" player. Promes then scored twice in the fifth round of the Russian Cup, in a 2–0 win over Kuban Krasnodar. However, during the match he suffered a hamstring injury which kept him out of action throughout September. After returning to the first team against Akhmat Grozny on 13 October, Promes scored twice as well as setting up two more goals in a 5–1 win over Sevilla in the UEFA Champions League four days later. For his performance against Sevilla, Promes was named Man of the Match by UEFA. By the end of 2017, Promes went on to score four goals, including two against CSKA Moscow on 12 December. During the first half of the season, Promes played in attacking midfield for the side. At that stage, he had scored 15 goals in all competitions. Shortly after, Promes was named December's Player of the Month. He was then named Footballer of the Year in Russia on 20 December 2017. Throughout the January transfer window, Promes was the subject of transfer bids from Premier League club Southampton. Spartak rejected a £25 million bid for Promes, citing the club's struggles to find a replacement. Promes scored a hat-trick on 8 April 2018, in a 4–1 win over Anzhi Makhachkala, and in doing so, surpassed Welliton to make him the most prolific foreign scorer in the club's history. In the last three matches of the season, Promes captained the side in the absence of Denis Glushakov. Having made 38 appearances and scored 21 goals in all competitions, Promes became the top scorer of the 2017–18 Russian Premier League with 15 goals.

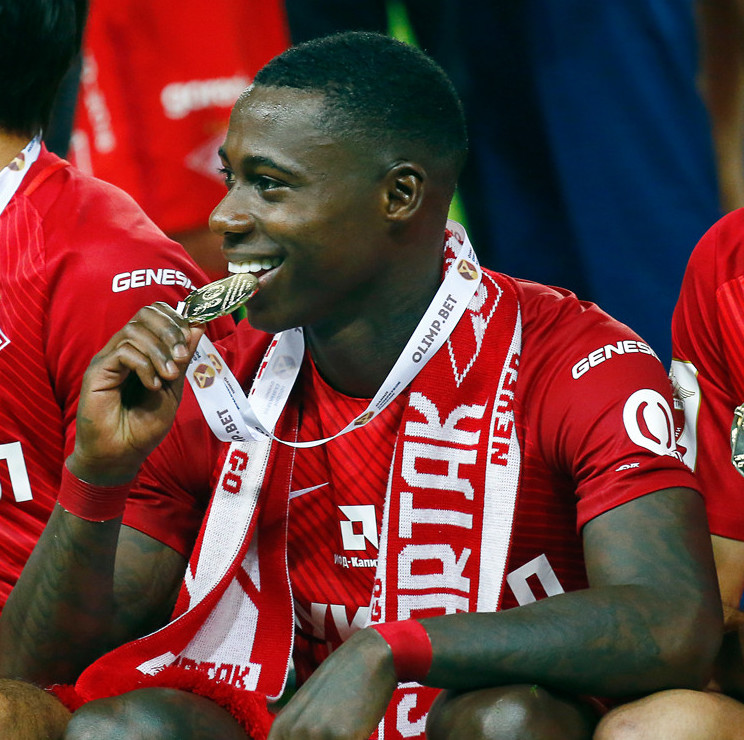
Promes receiving a medal following the club's win over Lokomotiv Moscow in the Russian Super Cup

==== 2018–19 season ====
In the 2018–19 season, Promes continued to remain in the first team, where he started out in the left-wing position. On 8 August 2018, he scored his first goal of the season in the first leg of the UEFA Champions League third qualifying round, as Spartak Moscow lost 3–2 to PAOK. Ultimately, the club was eventually eliminated from the tournament after drawing 0–0 in the second leg. A week later on 25 August, Promes scored his first league goal of the season, in a 2–1 win over Dynamo Moscow, in what turned out to be his last appearance for the club.

By the time of his Spartak Moscow departure, Promes had made 135 appearances and scored 66 times during his four-year spell there.

=== Sevilla ===
On 31 August 2018, Promes joined La Liga side Sevilla on a five-year deal. The move reportedly cost €20 million, which is Spartak Moscow's record sale.

He made his debut on 2 September 2018, as an 87th-minute substitute during a 1–0 away defeat to Real Betis. He ended the season with three goals and nine assists in 49 matches in all competitions.

=== Ajax ===
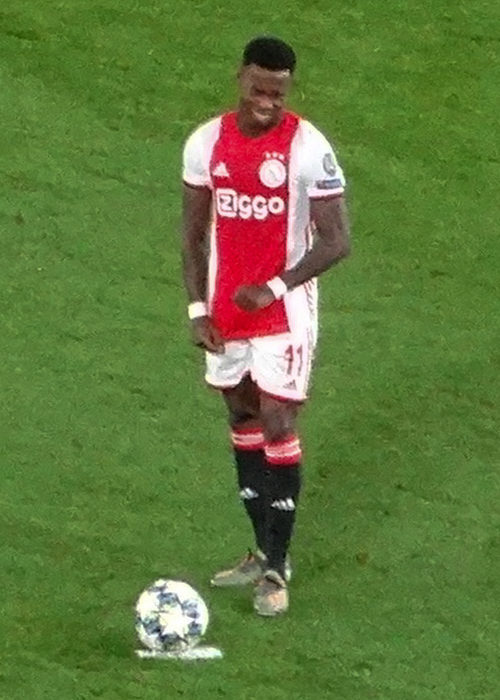
Promes playing for Ajax in 2019

On 24 June 2019, it was announced that Promes was moving to Eredivisie side AFC Ajax on a five-year deal, with a basic transfer fee of €15.7 million, which could rise to €17.2 million with add-ons. Promes made his debut for Ajax against PSV in the 2019 Johan Cruyff Shield on 27 July 2019, and was replaced in the 59' by Hakim Ziyech in Ajax's 2–0 win.

He scored 8 goals in his opening 12 league matches of the season which included a hat-trick against Fortuna Sittard and 2 goals in the opening 2 matches of the Champions League group stage. On 5 November, Promes inflicted an own goal from Tammy Abraham and scored later giving his side a 2–1 lead away from home against Chelsea. Ajax would extend their lead to 4–1, but Ajax were reduced to 9 men and ultimately Chelsea made a comeback to make it 4–4.

=== Return to Spartak Moscow ===
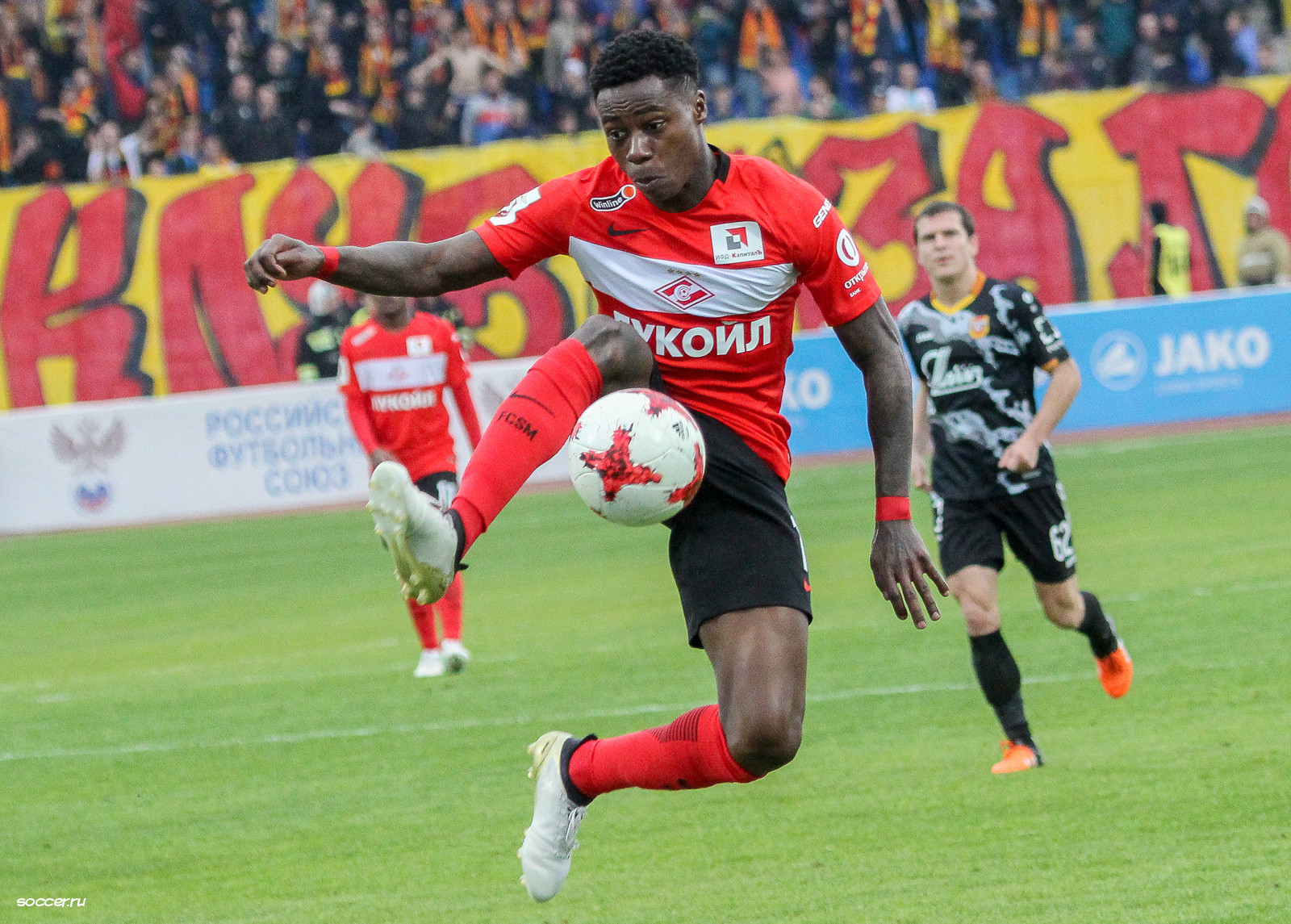
Quincy Promes in a match against Arsenal Tula following his return to Spartak

On 24 February 2021, it was announced that Promes had transferred back to his previous club, Spartak Moscow of the Russian Premier League, for a reported fee of €8.5 million, signing a contract for 3.5 years with the Russian side.

On 29 May 2022, Promes scored the winning goal in the 2–1 victory over FC Dynamo Moscow in the 2022 Russian Cup Final.

In the summer stage of the 2022–23 season, Promes was the league's top goalscorer, scoring 7 goals in 7 matches. By the end of the autumn stage, he remained the top goalscorer, although holding this title along with Vladimir Sychevoy with 14 goals scored each. On 11 March 2023, Promes scored his 100th competitive goal for Spartak, shortly after playing his 200th match. On 24 April 2023, Promes scored his 85th Russian Premier League goal, tying Vágner Love and Sardar Azmoun as the best foreign RPL scorers of all time. On 7 May 2023, Promes scored his 86th, overtaking Vágner Love and Azmoun. On 21 May 2023, Promes scored twice in a 2–1 comeback main Moscow derby victory over CSKA Moscow, becoming Spartak's best scorer in RPL history with 88 goals, overtaking Yegor Titov. He finished the league season with 20 goals, three behind the top scorer Malcom.

On 1 July 2024, Spartak announced that Promes' contract with the club had expired and would not be renewed due to his legal issues, though the club hoped they could sign him again if the issues were resolved.

=== Dubai United ===
On 4 September 2024, Promes joined UAE First Division League club Dubai United.

== International career ==
=== Youth career ===
In March 2011, Promes was called up by Netherlands U19 for the first time. He made his Netherlands U19 debut on 24 March 2011, starting the whole game, in a 1–0 loss against Italy U19. Promes went on to make three appearances for the Netherlands U19 side.

In August 2012, Promes was called up to the Netherlands U20 squad for the first time. He made his Netherlands U20 debut a month later on 8 September 2012, starting the whole game, in a 2–1 loss against Turkey U21. It wasn't until on 22 March 2013 when he scored his first Netherlands U20 goal, in a 3–2 win over Serbia U21. He went on to make four appearances and scored once for the Netherlands U20 side.

In August 2013, Promes was called up by Netherlands U21 for the first time. He made his Netherlands U21 debut, where he played 45 minutes after coming on as a second-half substitute, in a 1–0 loss against Czech Republic U21 on 14 August 2013. On 10 October 2013, he scored his first Netherlands U21 goals, in a 6–0 win over Georgia U21. After being cut from the squad for the 2014 FIFA World Cup, Promes scored a hat-trick on 28 May 2014, in a 6–1 win over Scotland U21, followed up by scoring twice, in a 3–1 win over Luxembourg U21. Promes went on to make 10 appearances and scoring 8 times for the Netherlands U21 side.

=== Senior career ===
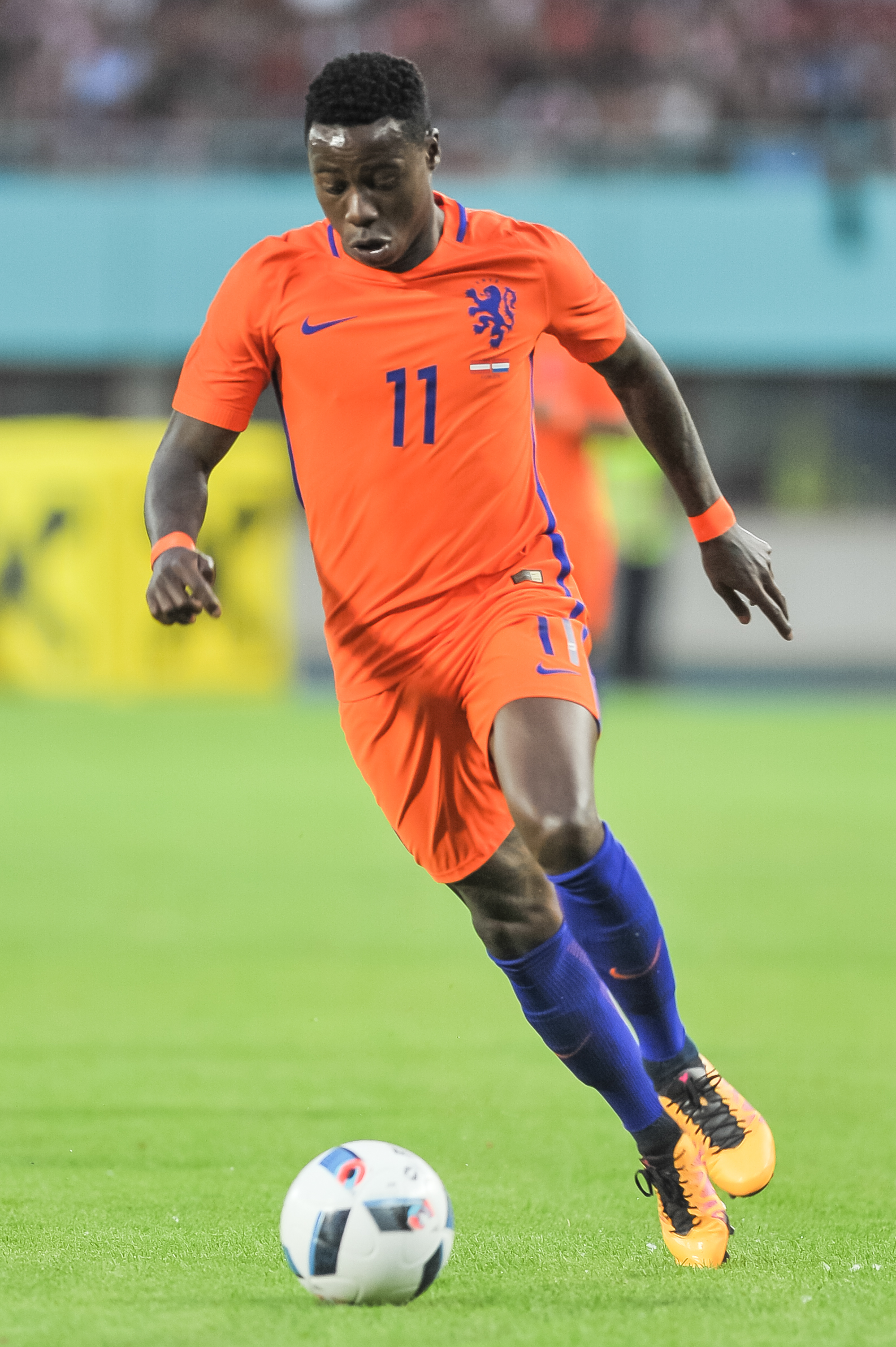
Promes playing for the senior team against Austria in 2016

In March 2014, Promes was called up by the senior team for the first time. He made his debut for the Netherlands on 5 March 2014 in a friendly match against France, in a 2–0 loss. After the match, Promes said he was happy to make his debut for the national team.

In May 2014, Promes was initially named by Manager Louis van Gaal for the provisional 30-man squad at FIFA World Cup in Brazil. However, he didn't make it to the final 23-man squad. He did not make another appearance for the senior team until on 13 October 2014 when he started the game before coming off in the last minutes, in a 2–0 loss against Iceland. It wasn't until on 7 October 2016 when he scored his first goals, in a 4–1 win over Belarus. Later in 2017, Promes scored two goals against Morocco and Luxembourg.

On 6 June 2019, Promes scored in the 30th minute of extra time of the Nations League semi-final to give Netherlands a 3–1 victory over England.

== Style of play ==
Promes said about his style of play, quote: "I have speed and technique, so I can show a beautiful game, create moments and make fans happy. I like to play football, which the viewer would be pleased to watch. The club's owner Leonid Fedun described him as a "very serious guy". Promes said he does not shout at his team-mates but rather gives them instructions.

Due to his goal-scoring form at Spartak Moscow, Promes was praised by the club's legendary figures Nikita Simonyan, the club's top scorer in the history with 160 goals, and Valeri Karpin. Promes was the club's favourite that he earned a nickname: "Antokha". In response to being fan favourite, Promes thanked the club's supporters for the achievement.

== Personal life ==
Promes was born in Amsterdam to Afro-Surinamese parents. His father was a professional footballer in Suriname but after moving to Netherlands, he played amateur football. Promes played football in the morning, afternoon and evening. As a result, he would be scolded by his mother for staying out late and not studying enough. Growing up, he idolised Ronaldinho and later Neymar in his football years.

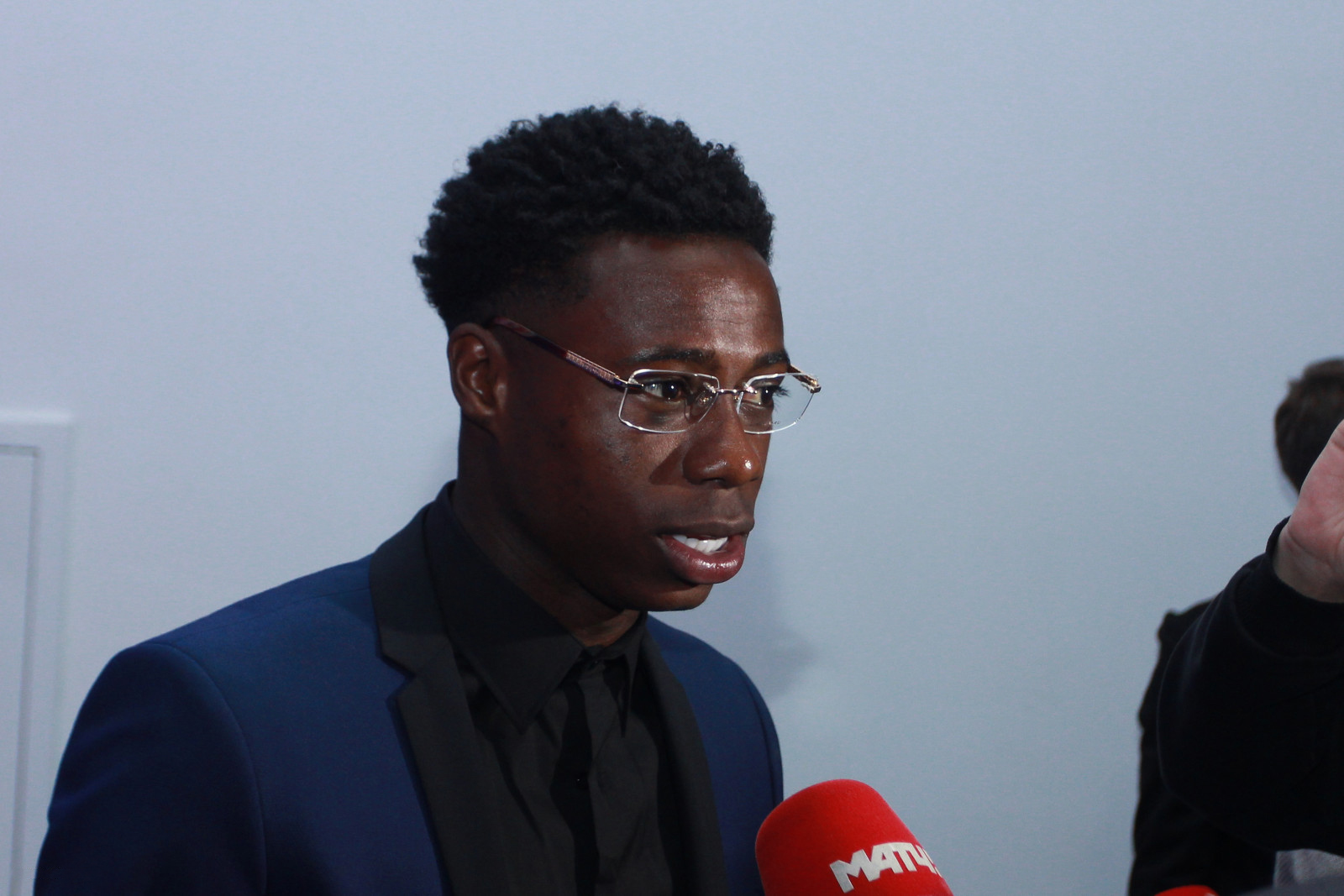
Promes being interviewed by the media in May 2017

In October 2015, when asked in an interview about racism in Russia, Promes responded: "Personally, I have never come across this in Russia. I do not understand it when they speak of racism as something natural for your country. There are small groups of people with such views, as elsewhere. But much more important, the people are open and friendly. European television for some reason always focuses on the negative points when it talks about Russia. That's war, that's something else. And I live here, communicate with people and see that everything here is different." Promes also stated that he never encountered racism with fans. After the club made controversial tweets about their own player, containing what some considered to be "racist references" in January 2018, Promes responded to the tweet: "I don't understand what is happening or where this reaction is coming from. Everything has been sensationalised by journalists. But I know the truth, and it's not what has been written. 'Chocolates'... To me, is fully ok."

Promes is married and has three children. He resided in Moscow with his wife, their three children, his mother and his brother. In 2023, he also became a resident of the United Arab Emirates.

Promes has said that he is good friends with Memphis Depay and that they speak with each other daily. In June 2017, Promes and Depay took part in a freestyle rap during a musical tour.

=== Criminal proceedings ===
In December 2020, Promes was detained as a suspect in a stabbing incident that had happened in July. He was released shortly after, pending investigation. The victim was his own cousin, who allegedly got into an argument with Promes. He denied involvement in the incident, but in November 2021 Dutch prosecutors concluded that he should be prosecuted. In March 2022, it was announced the specific charge Promes would face is attempted murder. A trial date was initially set for 30 March 2022, but it was later postponed due to a key participant of the trial falling ill and a new date was not immediately set. No travel restrictions have been imposed on Promes (instead, his assets in the Netherlands have been temporarily confiscated) and he has therefore been able to avoid pausing his career.

On 21 October 2022, the court set 3 March 2023 as the new date for Promes' criminal trial. Promes did not show up for the opening of his trial, opting to remain in Russia, with which the Netherlands does not have an extradition treaty. Prosecutors requested a two-year prison sentence. On 15 March 2023, it was reported that the trial was paused to assess the legality of a key piece of evidence. This referred to recordings of Promes speaking about his role in the stabbing incident in a call with his father, which the defense has argued could not be admissible in court as the warrant to tap Promes’ phone was issued based on an unrelated investigation into drug trafficking. Ultimately, it was determined that the attempted murder charge would be downgraded to an aggravated assault charge. On 19 June 2023, Promes was found guilty and sentenced to 18 months of imprisonment. His lawyer Robert Malevich said that they would be appealing the verdict, and Spartak released a statement saying that the decision does not take effect until the appeal process is complete.

On 30 May 2023, the Dutch prosecution service confirmed that after conducting the drug trafficking investigation, they had decided to prosecute Promes, alleging that he had attempted to import over 1.3 metric tonnes of cocaine through the Antwerp port back in January 2020. A hearing was set for 24 January 2024, in which the Dutch prosecution service demanded a nine-year prison term to him in absentia. On 14 February 2024, Promes was sentenced to 6 years in prison after being found guilty of drug trafficking. His lawyers have announced their intention to appeal the verdict. Promes was put on the international wanted list, though the possibility of his extradition was assessed as low, in part because the Netherlands and Russia do not have a bilateral legal assistance treaty. Following his conviction, Dutch prosecutors seized nine houses owned by Promes in Almere, Amsterdam, Utrecht and Abcoude.

On 29 February 2024, Promes was detained at the Al Maktoum International Airport on suspicion of leaving the scene of a traffic accident. Promes was returning to Russia from a mid-season camp the club held in the UAE. They had to depart without Promes, who subsequently missed the match against Zenit. He was released from custody the following day, but had to remain in the country until his court date for the minor charge, for which he was ultimately fined on 12 March, and on the same Dutch prosecutors formally requested his extradition. Due to the request, Promes was again required to remain in the country.

On 20 June 2025, Promes was extradited to the Netherlands. A Dutch court has ruled that he must remain in prison whilst appealing his convictions.

== Career statistics ==
=== Club ===
As of match played 30 May 2025

Appearances and goals by club, season and competition
Club	Season	League			National cup (Note: Includes KNVB Cup, Russian Cup, Copa del Rey)		Continental		Other		Total	
Club	Season	Division	Apps	Goals	Apps	Goals	Apps	Goals	Apps	Goals	Apps	Goals
Twente	2011–12	Eredivisie	3	0	0	0	—		—		3	0
Twente	2012–13	Eredivisie	0	0	0	0	1 (Note: Appearance(s) in UEFA Europa League)	0	—		1	0
Twente	2013–14	Eredivisie	31	11	0	0	—		—		31	11
Twente	Total		34	11	0	0	1	0	0	0	35	11
Go Ahead Eagles (loan)	2012–13	Eerste Divisie	32	13	3	1	—		6 (Note: Appearances in Eerste Divisie play-offs)	3	41	17
Spartak Moscow	2014–15	Russian Premier League	28	13	1	0	—		—		29	13
Spartak Moscow	2015–16	Russian Premier League	30	18	2	0	—		—		32	18
Spartak Moscow	2016–17	Russian Premier League	26	12	1	0	2	0	—		29	12
Spartak Moscow	2017–18	Russian Premier League	26	15	4	3	7 (Note: Five appearances and two goals in UEFA Champions League, two appearances in UEFA Europa League)	2	1 (Note: Appearance in Russian Super Cup)	1	38	21
Spartak Moscow	2018–19	Russian Premier League	5	1	0	0	2 (Note: Appearances in UEFA Champions League)	1	—		7	2
Spartak Moscow	Total		115	59	8	3	11	3	1	1	135	66
Sevilla	2018–19	La Liga	33	2	6	0	10	1	—		49	3
Ajax	2019–20	Eredivisie	20	12	1	0	6 (Note: Five appearances and four goals in UEFA Champions League, one appearance in UEFA Europa League)	4	1 (Note: Appearance in Johan Cruyff Shield)	0	28	16
Ajax	2020–21	Eredivisie	19	6	1	0	5	0	—		25	6
Ajax	Total		39	18	2	0	11	4	1	0	53	22
Spartak Moscow	2020–21	Russian Premier League	11	3	0	0	—		—		11	3
Spartak Moscow	2021–22	Russian Premier League	22	6	3	4	6	2	—		31	12
Spartak Moscow	2022–23	Russian Premier League	27	20	9	5	—		1	0	37	25
Spartak Moscow	2023–24	Russian Premier League	17	6	4	2	—		—		21	8
Spartak Moscow	Total		77	35	16	11	6	2	1	0	100	48
Dubai United	2024–25	UAE First Division	20	19	0	0	—		—		20	19
Career total			350	157	35	15	39	10	9	4	433	186

=== International ===
As of match played 27 June 2021

Appearances and goals by national team and year
National team	Year	Apps	Goals
Netherlands	2014	3	0
Netherlands	2015	4	0
Netherlands	2016	9	2
Netherlands	2017	9	2
Netherlands	2018	9	2
Netherlands	2019	8	1
Netherlands	2020	5	0
Netherlands	2021	3	0
Total		50	7

Scores and results list the Netherlands goal tally first, score column indicates score after each Promes goal.

List of international goals scored by Quincy Promes
No.	Date	Venue	Opponent	Score	Result	Competition
1	7 October 2016	De Kuip, Rotterdam, Netherlands	Belarus	1–0	4–1	2018 FIFA World Cup qualification
2	7 October 2016	De Kuip, Rotterdam, Netherlands	Belarus	2–0	4–1	2018 FIFA World Cup qualification
3	31 May 2017	Stade Adrar, Agadir, Morocco	Morocco	1–0	2–1	Friendly
4	9 June 2017	De Kuip, Rotterdam, Netherlands	Luxembourg	4–0	5–0	2018 FIFA World Cup qualification
5	31 May 2018	Štadión Antona Malatinského, Trnava, Slovakia	Slovakia	1–1	1–1	Friendly
6	19 November 2018	Arena AufSchalke, Gelsenkirchen, Germany	Germany	1–2	2–2	2018–19 UEFA Nations League A
7	6 June 2019	Estádio D. Afonso Henriques, Guimarães, Portugal	England	3–1	3–1 (a.e.t.)	2019 UEFA Nations League Finals

== Honours ==
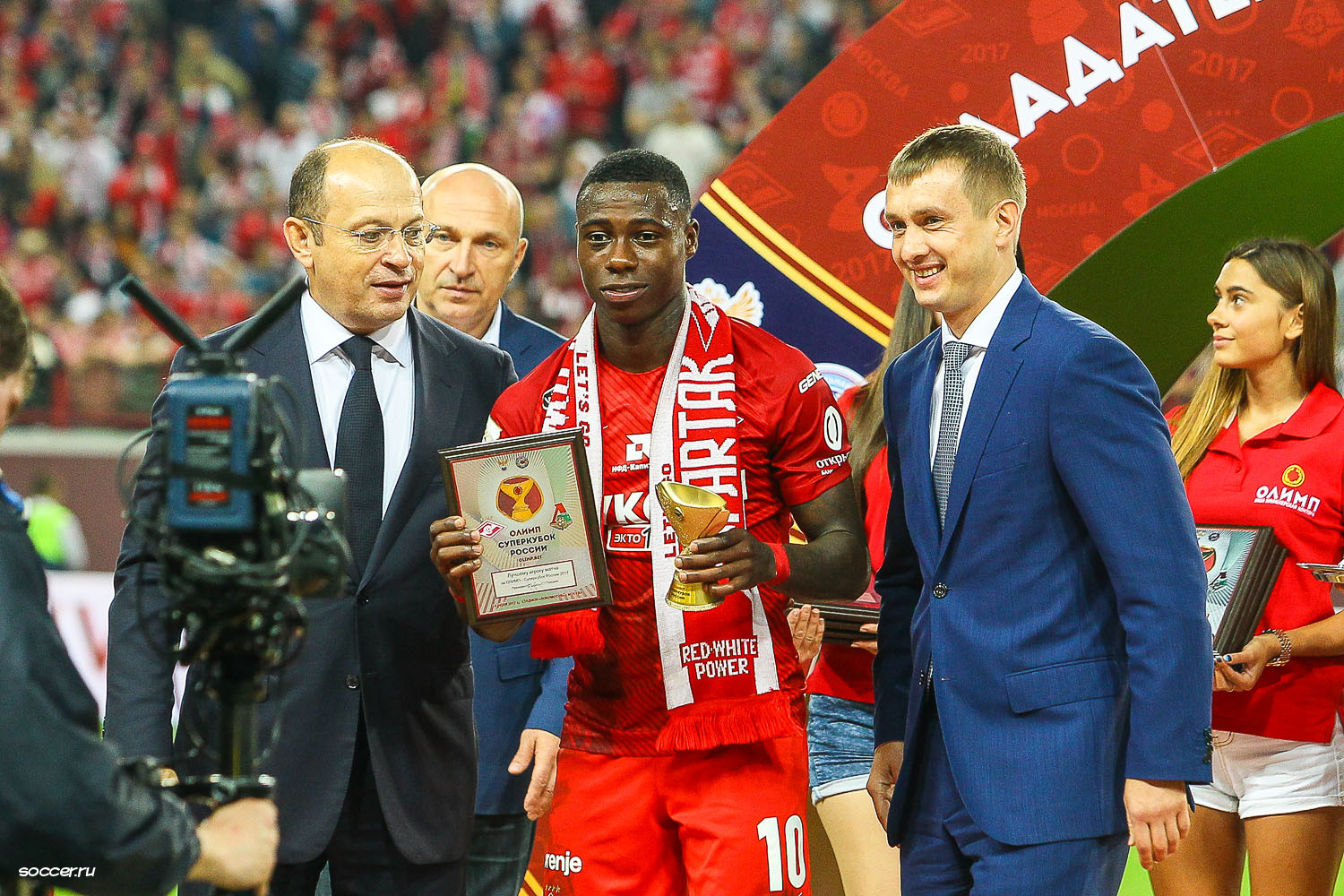
Promes upon receiving a prize following the club's win over Lokomotiv Moscow in the Russia Super Cup.

Spartak Moscow

- Russian Premier League: 2016–17
- Russian Cup: 2021–22
- Russian Super Cup: 2017

Ajax

- Johan Cruyff Shield: 2019

Individual

- Russian Premier League Player of the Month: November 2014, April 2015, August 2015, April 2017, July 2017, September 2017, November–December 2017, August 2022
- Spartak Moscow Player of the Year: 2014–15, 2015–16
- championat.com Footballer of the Year: 2016–17, 2017–18
- Futbol Footballer of the Year: 2017
- Sport Express Footballer of the Year: 2017
- Soccer Footballer of the Year: 2017
- Russian Premier League Right Winger of the Season: 2016–17
- Russian Premier League Top assist provider: 2016–17, 2017–18
- Russian Premier League Top scorer: 2017–18
- Russian Cup Top scorer: 2021–22
- Russian Premier League Fans' Choice award: 2022–23
- Russian Premier League Team of the Season: 2022–23

== See also ==
- David Mendes da Silva – another Dutch footballer involved with drug trafficking
