= Nemanja Pejčinović =

Serbian footballer

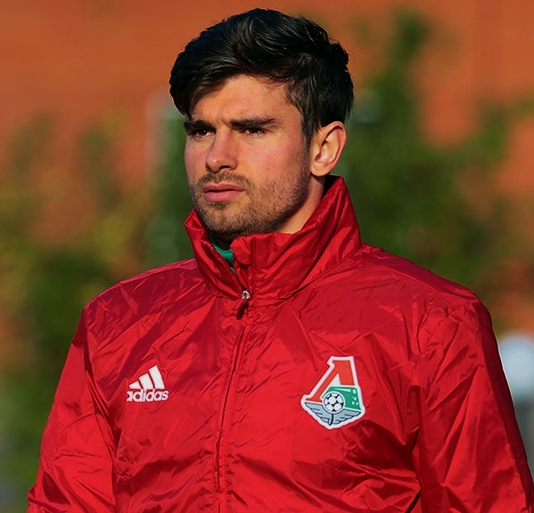
- Pejčinović with Lokomotiv Moscow in 2015

Personal information
- Full name: Nemanja Pejčinović
- Date of birth: 4 November 1987 (age 39)
- Place of birth: Kragujevac, SR Serbia, Yugoslavia
- Height: 1.85 m (6 ft 1 in)
- Position: Centre-back

Youth career
- Radnički Kragujevac
- 2003–2006: Rad

Senior career*
Years	Team	Apps	(Gls)
2005–2007	Rad	20	(0)
2007–2008	OFK Beograd	0	(0)
2008	→ Rad (loan)	16	(1)
2008–2010	Rad	16	(0)
2009	→ Red Star Belgrade (loan)	14	(0)
2009–2010	→ Hertha BSC (loan)	16	(0)
2010–2014	Nice	100	(6)
2014–2018	Lokomotiv Moscow	85	(3)
2018–2019	Changchun Yatai	13	(2)
2020	Voždovac	8	(0)
2020–2022	Fakel Voronezh	48	(4)
Total		336	(16)

International career
2008–2009	Serbia U21	12	(1)
2008–2016	Serbia	3	(0)
- * Club domestic league appearances and goals

Nemanja Pejčinović (Serbian Cyrillic: Немања Пејчиновић, pronounced [němaɲa pejtʃǐːnoʋitɕ]; born 4 November 1987) is a Serbian retired footballer who played as a centre-back.

A former Serbia U21 international, Pejčinović made three appearances for Serbia at full level between 2008 and 2016. In 2019, he was granted Russian citizenship.

== Club career ==
=== Career in Serbia ===
Born in Kragujevac, Pejčinović started out at hometown club Radnički. He was snapped up by Rad in 2003, alongside Nenad Tomović. In the summer of 2005, Pejčinović was promoted to the first-team squad and given the number 33 shirt for the upcoming 2005–06 campaign. He made one league appearance during his first senior season, as the club suffered relegation to the second tier. In 2006, Pejčinović also captained the under-19 team that won the double (league and cup). He subsequently played 19 matches in the 2006–07 Serbian First League, helping the side reach the promotion playoffs.

In June 2007, Pejčinović was transferred to Serbian SuperLiga side OFK Beograd. He failed to make his official debut for the club, before being loaned back to Rad in February 2008. Until the end of the 2007–08 Serbian First League, Pejčinović scored once in 16 games and helped the club earn promotion to the top flight through the playoffs. He subsequently signed with Rad on a permanent basis. In the 2009 winter transfer window, Pejčinović joined Red Star Belgrade on loan until the end of the season.

=== Germany and France ===
In July 2009, Pejčinović was loaned to German side Hertha BSC with an option to buy. He made 25 appearances in all competitions, including 16 games in the Bundesliga, failing to help the club avoid relegation from the top flight. In July 2010, Pejčinović moved to France and joined Nice, initially on a season-long loan, which became a permanent deal in December of that year. He made 100 appearances and scored six times in Ligue 1 over the next four seasons. In June 2014, it was announced that Pejčinović would be leaving the club after his contract expires.

=== Russia and China ===
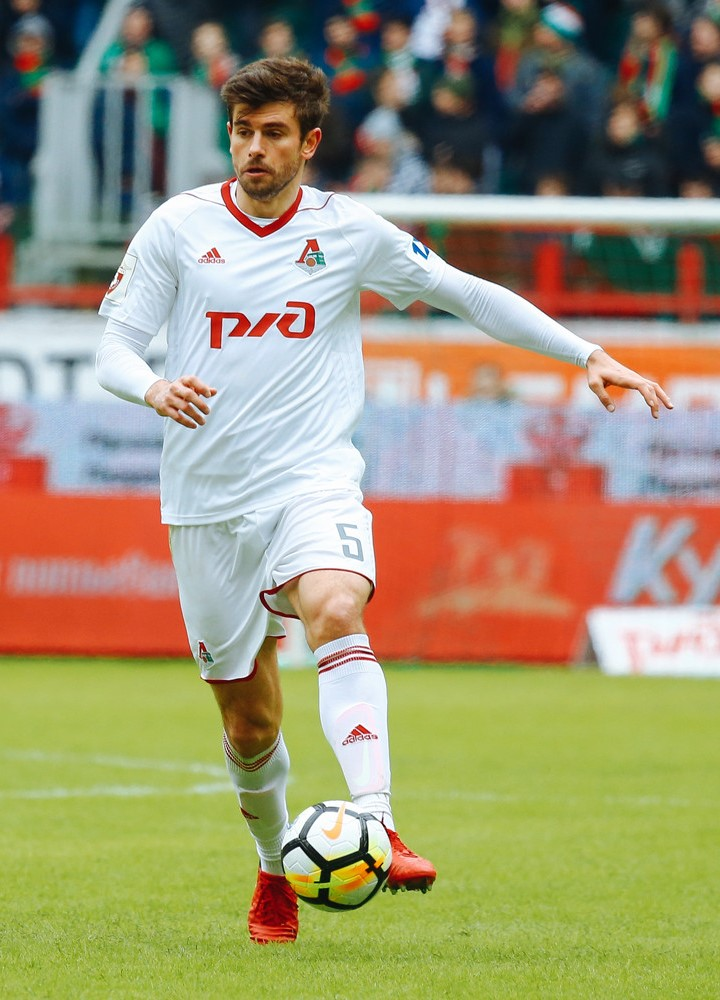
Pejčinović playing for Lokomotiv Moscow in 2018

On 11 June 2014, Pejčinović signed a long-term contract with Russian club Lokomotiv Moscow. He was a regular member of the team that won the 2017–18 Russian Premier League, their first championship title after 14 years. Previously, Pejčinović won two Russian Cups (2014–15 and 2016–17).

In July 2018, Pejčinović signed for Chinese club Changchun Yatai on a free transfer. The club suffered relegation from the Chinese Super League at the end of the 2018 season.

In October 2020, Pejcinovic signed with Russian Football National League club Fakel Voronezh on a one-year contract. After his contract expired the following year, he signed another deal with the club on 31 August 2021, this time until June 2022.

== International career ==
=== Serbia ===
Pejčinović represented Serbia at the 2009 UEFA European Under-21 Championship. He made his full international debut for Serbia on 14 December 2008, coming on as a substitute in a 1–0 friendly loss against Poland in Antalya, as the team was made up of mainly domestic-based players. In May 2014, Pejčinović received a call-up to the squad by caretaker Ljubinko Drulović ahead of Serbia's mini tour in the Americas, playing the full 90 minutes in a 2–1 win over Jamaica in Harrison, New Jersey. His final international was a November 2016 friendly match away against Ukraine

=== Request to change teams ===
In April 2019, Pejčinović was granted Russian citizenship. In October 2020, he stated that since he had not been called up to the Serbia national team for three years, he wanted to request permission to be called up for the Russia national team.

== Statistics ==
=== Club ===
Appearances and goals by club, season and competition
Club	Season	League			National Cup		League Cup		Continental		Other		Total	
Club	Season	Division	Apps	Goals	Apps	Goals	Apps	Goals	Apps	Goals	Apps	Goals	Apps	Goals
Rad	2005–06	First League of Serbia and Montenegro	1	0			—		—		—		1	0
Rad	2006–07	Serbian First League	19	0			—		—		0	0	19	0
Rad	Total		20	0			—		—		0	0	20	0
OFK Beograd	2007–08	Serbian SuperLiga	0	0	0	0	—		—		—		0	0
Rad (loan)	2007–08	Serbian First League	16	1	0	0	—		—		4 (Note: Appearances in Serbian First League playoffs)	0	20	1
Rad	2008–09	Serbian SuperLiga	16	0	2	0	—		—		—		18	0
Rad	Total		32	1	2	0	—		—		4	0	34	1
Red Star Belgrade (loan)	2008–09	Serbian SuperLiga	14	0	1	0	—		0	0	—		15	0
Hertha BSC (loan)	2009–10	Bundesliga	16	0	2	0	—		7 (Note: Appearances in UEFA Europa League)	0	—		25	0
Nice	2010–11	Ligue 1	33	1	5	0	0	0	—		—		38	1
Nice	2011–12	Ligue 1	23	1	1	0	2	0	—		—		26	1
Nice	2012–13	Ligue 1	29	3	1	0	1	0	—		—		31	3
Nice	2013–14	Ligue 1	15	1	0	0	1	1	0	0	—		16	2
Nice	Total		100	6	7	0	4	1	0	0	—		111	7
Lokomotiv Moscow	2014–15	Russian Premier League	14	0	4	0	—		1	0	—		19	0
Lokomotiv Moscow	2015–16	Russian Premier League	21	1	1	0	—		5	0	1 (Note: Appearances in Russian Super Cup)	0	28	1
Lokomotiv Moscow	2016–17	Russian Premier League	27	2	5	0	—		—		—		32	2
Lokomotiv Moscow	2017–18	Russian Premier League	23	0	1	0	—		10	0	1	0	35	0
Lokomotiv Moscow	Total		85	3	11	0	—		16	0	2	0	114	3
Changchun Yatai	2018	Chinese Super League	13	2	0	0	—		—		—		13	2
Voždovac	2019–20	Serbian SuperLiga	6	0	0	0	—		—		—		6	0
Voždovac	2020–21	Serbian SuperLiga	2	0	0	0	—		—		—		8	0
Voždovac	Total		8	0	0	0	—		—		—		14	0
Fakel Voronezh	2020–21	Russian Football National League	25	4	0	0	—		—		—		25	4
Fakel Voronezh	2021–22	Russian Football National League	23	0	1	0	—		—		—		24	0
Fakel Voronezh	Total		48	4	1	0	—		—		—		49	4
Career total			336	16	24	0	4	1	23	0	6	0	399	17

=== International ===
National team	Year	Apps	Goals
Serbia	2008	1	0
Serbia	2009	0	0
Serbia	2010	0	0
Serbia	2011	0	0
Serbia	2012	0	0
Serbia	2013	0	0
Serbia	2014	1	0
Serbia	2015	0	0
Serbia	2016	1	0
Total		3	0

== Honours ==
Lokomotiv Moscow

- Russian Premier League: 2017–18
- Russian Cup: 2014–15, 2016–17
- Russian Super Cup: Runner-up 2015, 2017
