= Mikhail Lysov =

Russian footballer

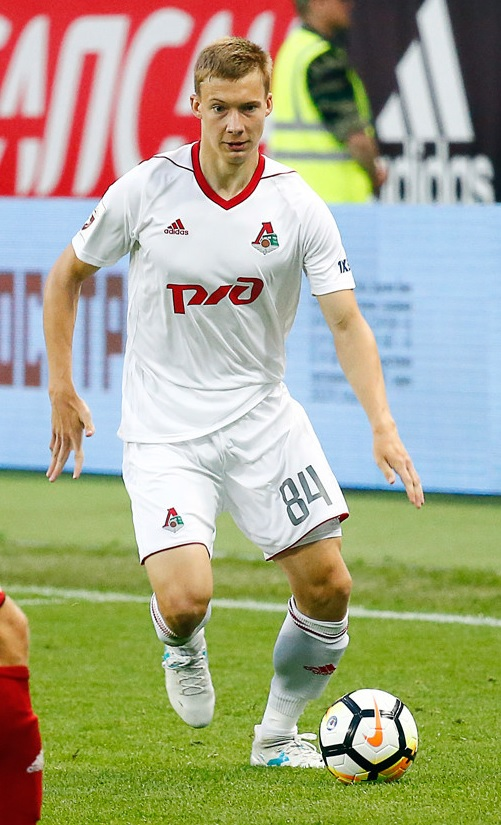
- Lysov with Lokomotiv in 2017

Personal information
- Full name: Mikhail Pavlovich Lysov
- Date of birth: 29 January 1998 (age 28)
- Place of birth: Vladimir, Russia
- Height: 1.82 m (6 ft 0 in)
- Position: Left back

Youth career
- Torpedo Vladimir
- 2014–2017: Lokomotiv Moscow

Senior career*
Years	Team	Apps	(Gls)
2017–2021	Lokomotiv Moscow	23	(0)
2019–2020	→ Kazanka Moscow	1	(0)

International career
2013	Russia U15	4	(0)
2013	Russia U16	1	(0)
2014–2015	Russia U17	26	(1)
2016	Russia U18	1	(0)
2016	Russia U19	6	(2)
2017–2019	Russia U21	12	(0)
- * Club domestic league appearances and goals

Mikhail Pavlovich Lysov (Russian: Михаил Павлович Лысов; born 29 January 1998) is a Russian former professional football player who played as a left back.

== Club career ==
He made his debut in the Russian Premier League for FC Lokomotiv Moscow on 18 July 2017 in a game against FC Arsenal Tula.

In late September 2020, he was diagnosed with blood vessels issues and the doctors recommended that he stop playing football for several months and kept under observation. He retired in July 2021 due to heart complications.

== Honours ==
=== Club ===
Lokomotiv Moscow

- Russian Premier League: 2017–18
- Russian Cup: 2018–19

== Career statistics ==
=== Club ===
As of 22 May 2018

Club	Season	League			Cup (Note: Includes Russian Cup.)		Continental (Note: Includes UEFA Europa League and UEFA Champions League.)		Other		Total	
Club	Season	Division	Apps	Goals	Apps	Goals	Apps	Goals	Apps	Goals	Apps	Goals
Lokomotiv Moscow	2017–18	Premier Liga	13	0	1	0	5	0	0	0	19	0
Lokomotiv Moscow	2018–19	Premier Liga	8	0	3	0	1	0	0	0	12	0
Lokomotiv Moscow	2019–20	Premier Liga	1	0	0	0	0	0	0	0	1	0
Lokomotiv Moscow	2020–21	Premier Liga	1	0	0	0	0	0	0	0	1	0
Lokomotiv Moscow	Total		23	0	4	0	6	0	0	0	33	0
FC Kazanka Moscow	2019–20	PFL West	1	0	–		–		–		1	0
Career Total			24	0	4	0	6	0	0	0	34	0

== Personal life ==
His younger brother Aleksey Lysov is also a professional football player.
