= 1990 Soviet Cup final =

- Event: 1989–90 Soviet Cup
Lokomotiv Moscow	Dynamo Kyiv
1	6
- Date: 2 May 1990
- Venue: Lenin's Central Stadium, Moscow
- Referee: Ivan Timoshenko (Rostov/Don)
- Attendance: 15,000
- Weather: 8 °C

The 1990 Soviet Cup final was a football match that took place at Lenin's Central Stadium, Moscow on 2 May 1990. The match was the 49th Soviet Cup Final and it was contested by FC Dynamo Kyiv (I tier) and FC Lokomotiv Moscow (II tier). The Soviet Cup winner Dynamo qualified for the Cup Winners' Cup first round for the Soviet Union. The defending champions from the previous year, Dnipro Dnipropetrovsk, were eliminated in the first round of the competition (1/16 of final) by PFC CSKA Moscow on away goal rule (1:1, 2:2). Dynamo played their 10th Cup Final winning on 9 occasions including this one. For Lokomotiv, it was only their third Cup Final and their only loss at this stage.

== Road to Moscow ==
All sixteen Soviet Top League clubs did not have to go through qualification to get into the competition, so Dynamo and Lokomotiv both qualified for the competition automatically.

Lokomotiv Moscow

Round 1 (1st leg)	Kryvbas	1–3	Lokomotiv
Round 1 (2nd leg)	Lokomotiv	5–0	Kryvbas
	(Lokomotiv won 8–1 on aggregate)		
Round 2 (1st leg)	Žalgiris	1–1	Lokomotiv
Round 2 (2nd leg)	Lokomotiv	3–0	Žalgiris
	(Lokomotiv won 4–1 on aggregate)		
Quarter-final	Lokomotiv	2–0	Torpedo
Semi-final	Dynamo M.	0–0 aet 2–4 pen.	Lokomotiv

Dynamo Kyiv

Round 1 (1st leg)	Kairat	0–1	Dynamo
Round 1 (2nd leg)	Dynamo	3–1	Kairat
	(Dynamo won 4–1 on aggregate)		
Round 2 (1st leg)	Dynamo	1–0	Dynamo Tb.
Round 2 (2nd leg)	Iberia	–:+	Dynamo
	(Dynamo got technical win as Tbilisi withdrew)		
Quarter-final	Metalist	0–1	Dynamo
Semi-final	Dynamo	4–2	CSKA

== Previous encounters ==
Previously, these two teams had never met each other in such late stages of the competition. However, they did meet about five times in the Soviet Cup, usually in the early rounds. They first played each other in the Soviet Cup back in 1938.

== Match details ==
2 May 1990
?:? LST

Lokomotiv Moscow	1–6	Dynamo Kyiv
Yevgeny Mileshkin 52' (pen.)	Report	Oleksiy Mykhailychenko 19'; Vasyl Rats 30'; Oleg Salenko 43', 65', 90'; Hennadiy Lytovchenko 71'

Lenin's Central Stadium, Moscow
Attendance: 15,000
Referee: Ivan Timoshenko (Rostov/Don)

Lokomotiv Moscow	Dynamo Kyiv

FC Lokomotiv Moscow:
GK	(Russian Soviet Federative Socialist Republic) Khasanbi Bidzhiyev
DF	(Russian Soviet Federative Socialist Republic) Pavel Nesterov
DF	(Russian Soviet Federative Socialist Republic) Yevgeny Mileshkin (c)
MF	(Russian Soviet Federative Socialist Republic) Aleksey Arifullin
DF	(Russian Soviet Federative Socialist Republic) Andrey Solovtsov
DF	(Russian Soviet Federative Socialist Republic) Dmitry Gorkov
MF	(Russian Soviet Federative Socialist Republic) Kirill Rybakov (substituted off) 60'
MF	(Russian Soviet Federative Socialist Republic) Rashid Gallakberov
MF	(Russian Soviet Federative Socialist Republic) Oleg Samatov (substituted off) 60'
FW	(Russian Soviet Federative Socialist Republic) Sergey Sukhov (substituted off) 82'
FW	(Russian Soviet Federative Socialist Republic) Igor Chugaynov
Substitutes:
FW	(Russian Soviet Federative Socialist Republic) Mikhail Pronichev (substituted on) 60' (Rybakov)
DF	(Russian Soviet Federative Socialist Republic) Valery Plotnikov (substituted on) 60'
MF	(Russian Soviet Federative Socialist Republic) Andrey Fedin (substituted on) 82'
GK
DF
DF
MF
Manager:
(Russian Soviet Federative Socialist Republic) Yuriy Siomin

FC Dynamo Kyiv:
1	(Ukrainian Soviet Socialist Republic) Viktor Chanov
2	(Ukrainian Soviet Socialist Republic) Serhiy Shmatovalenko
8	(Ukrainian Soviet Socialist Republic) Anatoliy Demyanenko (c) (substituted off) 83'
4	(Ukrainian Soviet Socialist Republic) Oleh Kuznetsov
3	(Georgian Soviet Socialist Republic) Akhrik Tsveyba
5	(Ukrainian Soviet Socialist Republic) Vasyl Rats
11	(Ukrainian Soviet Socialist Republic) Oleksiy Mykhailychenko (substituted off) 83'
7	(Ukrainian Soviet Socialist Republic) Hennadiy Lytovchenko
6	(Ukrainian Soviet Socialist Republic) Serhiy Zayets (substituted off) 52'
10	(Ukrainian Soviet Socialist Republic) Oleh Protasov
9	(Russian Soviet Federative Socialist Republic) Oleg Salenko
Substitutes:
12	(Ukrainian Soviet Socialist Republic) Oleh Luzhnyi (substituted on) 83' (Demyanenko)
13	(Ukrainian Soviet Socialist Republic) Andriy Bal (substituted on) 83'
14	(Ukrainian Soviet Socialist Republic) Serhiy Kovalets (substituted on) 52'
GK
DF
DF
MF
Manager:
(Ukrainian Soviet Socialist Republic) Valeriy Lobanovsky

MATCH OFFICIALS

- Assistant referees:
  - Vladimir Markin (Rostov/Don)
  - Yevgeniy Aleksandrov (Yaroslavl)
- Fourth official: ( )

MATCH RULES

- 90 minutes.
- 30 minutes of extra-time if necessary.
- Penalty shoot-out if scores still level.
- Seven named substitutes
- Maximum of 3 substitutions.

== See also ==
- Soviet Top League 1989
