= 1989–90 Soviet Cup =

1989–90 Cup of USSR in Football
Кубок СССР

Tournament details
- Country: Soviet Union
- Dates: May 2, 1989 – May 2, 1990
- Teams: 80

Final positions
- Champions: Dynamo Kyiv
- Runners-up: Lokomotiv Moscow

The 1989–90 Soviet Cup was the 49th cup competition of the Soviet Union. The winner of the competition Dynamo Kyiv qualified for the continental tournament.

== Competition overview ==
There were 80 teams of masters will that took part, including 16 teams of the Top league, 22 of the First and 42 of the Second league.

The teams of the First and Second leagues began their games of the 1/64 finals on May 2 using a system with elimination after the first defeat. If the match ends in a draw, then extra time is assigned, two halves of 15 minutes each. If extra time does not reveal the winner, then, in accordance with FIFA Regulations, the best team is determined using penalty kicks. In competitions for the USSR Cup, no more than three players are allowed to be replaced during the game.

All teams in the 1/64 finals are distributed by lot and the home team received odd numbers, and in the 1/32 finals, the venues for the games are determined by the difference in receptions and departures of the meeting teams. Teams that have traveled in the previous round have an advantage. In case of equality of receptions and departures, the venues for the next games are determined by lot. The games of this round take place on June 1.

In the 1/16 finals, according to the Cup grid, 16 teams of the major league will meet with the winners of the 1/32 final pairs (June 29–30), and in the first games of the 1/16 finals, the home team in all 16 pairs are the teams that win the pairs 1/ There are 32 finals, and in the return matches (July 17–18), major league teams will play on their home fields. The 1/16 and 1/8 final stages are played out of two games - on your own field and the opponent's field. For the first games of the 1/8 finals, the home team is determined by lot. The matches of this stage will take place on November 12 and 16.

The winners of the 1/16 and 1/8 final pairs are determined by the overall result of the games according to the UEFA rules approved for European cup tournaments of club teams. The quarter-finals, semi-finals and finals will take place next year.

== Participating teams ==
Enter in Round of 32	Enter in First Preliminary Round			
1989 Vysshaya Liga; 16/16 teams	1989 Pervaya Liga; 22/22 teams	1989 Vtoraya Liga; 42/195 teams		
✓ Spartak Moscow; ✓ Dnepr Dnepropetrovsk; ✓ Dinamo Kiev; ✓ Zalgiris Vilnius; ✓ Torpedo Moscow; ✓ Chernomorets Odessa; ✓ Metallist Kharkov; ✓ Dinamo Moscow; ✓ Dinamo Minsk; ✓ Rotor Volgograd; ✓ Iberia Tbilisi; ✓ Ararat Erevan; ✓ Pamir Dushambe; ✓ Shakhter Donetsk; ✓ Lokomotiv Moscow (v); ✓ Zenit Leningrad (v)	✓ CSKA Moscow (^); ✓ Guria Lanchkhuti (^); ✓ Kairat Alma-Ata; ✓ Dinamo Stavropol; ✓ Fakel Voronezh; ✓ Tavria Simferopol; ✓ Metallurg Zaporozhye; ✓ Neftchi Baku; ✓ Kotaik Abovian; ✓ Zimbrul Kishenev; ✓ Geolog Tyumen; ✓ Pakhtakor Tashkent; ✓ FC Kutaisi; ✓ Rostselmash Rostov-na-Donu; ✓ Kuzbass Kemerovo; ✓ Shinnik Yaroslavl; ✓ Spartak Ordzhonikidze; ✓ FC Batumi; ✓ Kuban Krasnodar; ✓ SKA Rostov-na-Donu (v); ✓ Daugava Riga (v); ✓ SKA Karpaty Lvov (v)	✓ Krylya Sovietov Kuibyshev; ✓ Sokol Saratov; ✓ Torpedo Ryazan; ✓ Zaria Kaluga; ✓ Saturn Ramenskoye; ✓ Dinamo Vologda	✓ Uralmash Sverdlovsk; ✓ Zenit Izhevsk; ✓ Gastello Ufa; ✓ Zvezda Perm	✓ Tsement Novorossiysk; ✓ Druzhba Maikop; ✓ Spartak Nalchik; ✓ Torpedo Taganrog
✓ Spartak Moscow; ✓ Dnepr Dnepropetrovsk; ✓ Dinamo Kiev; ✓ Zalgiris Vilnius; ✓ Torpedo Moscow; ✓ Chernomorets Odessa; ✓ Metallist Kharkov; ✓ Dinamo Moscow; ✓ Dinamo Minsk; ✓ Rotor Volgograd; ✓ Iberia Tbilisi; ✓ Ararat Erevan; ✓ Pamir Dushambe; ✓ Shakhter Donetsk; ✓ Lokomotiv Moscow (v); ✓ Zenit Leningrad (v)	✓ CSKA Moscow (^); ✓ Guria Lanchkhuti (^); ✓ Kairat Alma-Ata; ✓ Dinamo Stavropol; ✓ Fakel Voronezh; ✓ Tavria Simferopol; ✓ Metallurg Zaporozhye; ✓ Neftchi Baku; ✓ Kotaik Abovian; ✓ Zimbrul Kishenev; ✓ Geolog Tyumen; ✓ Pakhtakor Tashkent; ✓ FC Kutaisi; ✓ Rostselmash Rostov-na-Donu; ✓ Kuzbass Kemerovo; ✓ Shinnik Yaroslavl; ✓ Spartak Ordzhonikidze; ✓ FC Batumi; ✓ Kuban Krasnodar; ✓ SKA Rostov-na-Donu (v); ✓ Daugava Riga (v); ✓ SKA Karpaty Lvov (v)	✓ Irtysh Omsk; ✓ Amur Blagoveshchensk; ✓ Lokomotiv Chita; ✓ Metallurg Novokuznetsk	✓ Tiligul Tiraspol (^); ✓ Atlantas Klapeida; ✓ Dnepr Mogilev; ✓ Khimik Grodno	✓ Bukovina Chernovtsy; ✓ Zaria Voroshilovgrad; ✓ SKA Odessa; ✓ Vorskla Poltava; ✓ Krivbass Krivoi Rog; ✓ Podolie Khmelnitsiy; ✓ Kolos Nikopol; ✓ Chaika Sevastopol; ✓ Okean Kerch
✓ Spartak Moscow; ✓ Dnepr Dnepropetrovsk; ✓ Dinamo Kiev; ✓ Zalgiris Vilnius; ✓ Torpedo Moscow; ✓ Chernomorets Odessa; ✓ Metallist Kharkov; ✓ Dinamo Moscow; ✓ Dinamo Minsk; ✓ Rotor Volgograd; ✓ Iberia Tbilisi; ✓ Ararat Erevan; ✓ Pamir Dushambe; ✓ Shakhter Donetsk; ✓ Lokomotiv Moscow (v); ✓ Zenit Leningrad (v)	✓ CSKA Moscow (^); ✓ Guria Lanchkhuti (^); ✓ Kairat Alma-Ata; ✓ Dinamo Stavropol; ✓ Fakel Voronezh; ✓ Tavria Simferopol; ✓ Metallurg Zaporozhye; ✓ Neftchi Baku; ✓ Kotaik Abovian; ✓ Zimbrul Kishenev; ✓ Geolog Tyumen; ✓ Pakhtakor Tashkent; ✓ FC Kutaisi; ✓ Rostselmash Rostov-na-Donu; ✓ Kuzbass Kemerovo; ✓ Shinnik Yaroslavl; ✓ Spartak Ordzhonikidze; ✓ FC Batumi; ✓ Kuban Krasnodar; ✓ SKA Rostov-na-Donu (v); ✓ Daugava Riga (v); ✓ SKA Karpaty Lvov (v)	✓ Neftyanik Fergana; ✓ Novbakhor Namangan; ✓ Kasansaets Kasansai; ✓ Sokhibkor Khalkabad	✓ Traktor Pavlodar; ✓ Alga Frunze; ✓ Meliorator Chimkent; ✓ Energetik Kustanai	✓ Goyazan Kazakh; ✓ Kyapaz Gyandzha; ✓ Metallurg Rustavi

Source: []

== Competition schedule ==
=== First preliminary round ===
All games took place on May 2, 1989.

Team 1	Score	Team 2
April 14
Alga Frunze (III)	3–0	(III) Metallurg Novokuznetsk
May 2
Khimik Grodno (III)	1–0	(II) SKA Karpaty Lvov
Tekstilschik Tiraspol (III)	1–1 (5–3 p)	(II) Nistru Kishenev
Atlantas Klapeida (III)	1–2	(II) Metalurh Zaporizhia
Podollia Khmelnytskyi (III)	0–2	(III) Okean Kerch
Vorskla Poltava (III)	3–0	(II) Tavriya Simferopol
SKA Odessa (III)	2–1	(III) Chaika Sevastopol
Kryvbas Kryvyi Rih (III)	2–1	(II) Daugava Riga
Dnepr Mogilev (III)	1–0	(III) Bukovyna Chernivtsi
Zorya Luhansk (III)	1–0	(II) Kuban Krasnodar
Torpedo Taganrog (III)	1–2	(II) Shinnik Yaroslavl
Tsement Novorossiysk (III)	2–1 (a.e.t.)	(II) Kotayk Abovian
Torpedo Ryazan (III)	1–3	(III) Spartak Nalchik
Kolos Nikopol (III)	1–0	(II) Fakel Voronezh
Dynamo Stavropol (II)	3–0	(III) Zaria Kaluga
Druzhba Maikop (III)	1–2	(II) Rostselmash Rostov-na-Donu
Dynamo Vologda (III)	1–0	(III) Saturn Ramenskoye
Traktor Pavlodar (III)	0–2	(II) Kairat Alma-Ata
Meliorator Chimkent (III)	1–1 (5–4 p)	(II) SKA Rostov-na-Donu
Sokhibkor Khalkabad (III)	1–1 (4–2 p)	(II) Geolog Tyumen
Novbakhor Namangan (III)	3–0	(III) Energetik Kustanai
Kasansaets Kasansai (III)	1–4	(II) Pakhtakor Tashkent
Lokomotiv Chita (III)	1–0	(II) Kuzbass Kemerevo
Amur Blagoveschensk (III)	2–0	(III) Neftyanik Fergana
Kyapaz Ganja (III)	0–1	(II) CSKA Moscow
Sokol Saratov (III)	6–3	(II) Torpedo Kutaisi
Zenit Izhevsk (III)	0–1	(II) Neftchi Baku
Gastello Ufa (III)	1–2	(III) Goyazan Kazakh
Metallurg Rustavi (III)	3–2	(II) Dinamo Batumi
Krylia Sovetov Kuibyshev (III)	1–0	(II) Spartak Ordzhonikidze
Zvezda Perm (III)	2–3 (a.e.t.)	(III) Guria Lanchkhuti
Irtysh Omsk (III)	1–0	(III) Uralmash Sverdlovsk

=== Second preliminary round ===
Games took place on June 1, 1989.

Team 1	Score	Team 2
June 1
Tekstilshchik Tiraspol (III)	3–0	(III) Khimik Grodno
Okean Kerch (III)	0–4	(II) Metalurh Zaporizhia
Vorskla Poltava (III)	1–0	(III) SKA Odessa
Dnepr Mogilev (III)	1–4	(II) Kryvbas Kryvyi Rih
Shinnik Yaroslavl (II)	1–0	(III) Zorya Luhansk
Spartak Nalchik (III)	w/o	(III) Tsement Novorossiysk
Dynamo Stavropol (II)	1–0	(III) Kolos Nikopol
Rostselmash Rostov-na-Donu (II)	1–2	(III) Dinamo Vologda
Kairat Alma-Ata (II)	2–0	(III) Meliorator Chimkent
Novbakhor Namangan (III)	3–0	(III) Sokhibkor Khalkabad
Pakhtakor Tashkent (II)	1–0	(III) Alga Frunze
Amur Blagoveschensk (III)	2–0	(III) Lokomotiv Chita
CSKA Moscow (II)	4–2	(III) Sokol Saratov
Goyazan Kazakh (III)	1–2	(II) Neftchi Baku
Krylia Sovetov Kuibyshev (III)	4–0	(III) Metallurg Rustavi
Guria Lanchkhuti (II)	w/o	(III) Irtysh Omsk

=== Bracket ===
Round of 32
Shinnik Yaroslavl	0	1	1
Spartak Moscow	1	2	3
Tsement Novorossiysk	0	0	0
Dinamo Minsk	1	1	2
Dinamo Stavropol	1	2	3
Dinamo Moscow	3	2	5
Dinamo Vologda	2	2	4
Ararat Yerevan (a)	4	0	4
Vorskla Poltava	1	1	2
Zalgiris Vilnius	0	5	5
Krivbass Krivoi Rog	1	0	1
Lokomotiv Moscow	3	5	8
Metallurg Zaporozhye	0	1	1
Chernomorets Odessa	1	1	2
Tekstilschik Tiraspol	2	0	2
Torpedo Moscow	2	4	6
Pakhtakor Tashkent	3	3	6
Pamir Dushanbe	2	0	2
Amur Blagoveschensk	2	-	-
Metallist Kharkov	3	+	+
Kairat Alma-Ata	0	1	1
Dinamo Kiev	1	3	4
Dinamo Tbilisi	5	2	7
Novbakhor Namangan	0	0	0
Neftchi Baku	2	0	2
Rotor Volgograd	1	3	4
CSKA Moscow (a)	1	2	3
Dnepr Dnepropetrovsk	1	2	3
Guria Lanchkhuti	1	2	3
Shakhter Donetsk	0	4	4
Zenit Leningrad	2	0	2
Krylia Sovetov Kuibyshev	5	4	9

Round of 16
Spartak Moscow	2	0	2
Dinamo Minsk (a)	1	1	2
Dinamo Moscow	1	1	2
Ararat Yerevan	0	0	0
Zalgiris Vilnius	1	0	1
Lokomotiv Moscow	1	3	4
Chernomorets Odessa	1	0	1
Torpedo Moscow	0	3	3
Pakhtakor Tashkent	0	2	2
Metallist Kharkov	3	0	3
Dinamo Kiev	1	+	+
Dinamo Tbilisi	0	-	-
Rotor Volgograd	3	0	3
CSKA Moscow	2	2	4
Shakhter Donetsk	0	0	0
Krylia Sovetov Kuibyshev	0	1	1

Quarterfinals
Dinamo Minsk	0(4)
Dinamo Moscow (p)	0(5)
Lokomotiv Moscow	2
Torpedo Moscow	0
Metallist Kharkov	0
Dinamo Kiev	1
CSKA Moscow	3
Krylia Sovetov Kuibyshev	1

Semifinals
Dinamo Moscow	0(2)
Lokomotiv Moscow (p)	0(4)
Dinamo Kiev	4
CSKA Moscow	2

Final
Lokomotiv Moscow	1
Dinamo Kiev	6

=== Round of 32 ===
First leg games took place on June 29–30, 1989, while second leg games were scheduled on July 17–18.

Team 1	Agg.	Team 2	1st leg	2nd leg
First leg – June 29, Second leg – July 17
Vorskla Poltava (III)	2–5	(I) Zalgiris Vilnius	1–0	1–5
Guria Lanchkhuti (II)	3–4	(I) Shakhtar Donetsk	1–0	2–4
Dynamo Stavropol (II)	3–5	(I) Dynamo Moscow	1–3	2–2
Neftçi Baku (II)	2–4	(I) Rotor Volgograd	2–1	0–3
CSKA Moscow (II)	3–3 (a)	(I) Dnipro Dnipropetrovsk	1–1	2–2
First leg – June 29, Second leg – July 18
Amur Blagoveschensk (III)	-/+	(I) Metalist Kharkiv	2–3	-/+
Metalurh Zaporizhia (II)	1–2	(I) Chornomorets Odesa	0–1	1–1
Tekstilschik Tiraspol (III)	2–6	(I) Torpedo Moscow	2–2	0–4
Shinnik Yaroslavl (II)	1–3	(I) Spartak Moscow	0–1	1–2
First leg – June 30, Second leg – July 17
Kairat Alma-Ata (II)	1–4	(I) Dynamo Kyiv	0–1	1–3
Kryvbas Kryvyi Rih (III)	1–8	(I) Lokomotiv Moscow	1–3	0–5
Pakhtakor Tashkent (II)	6–2	(I) Pamir Dushanbe	3–2	3–0
Tsement Novorossiysk (III)	0–2	(I) Dinamo Minsk	0–1	0–1
First leg – June 30, Second leg – July 18
Dinamo Vologda (III)	4–4 (a)	(I) Ararat Yerevan	2–4	2–0
Zenit Leningrad (I)	2–9	(III) Krylia Sovetov Kuibyshev	2–5	0–4
First leg – July 14, Second leg – July 17
Dinamo Tbilisi (I)	7–0	(III) Novbakhor Namangan	5–0	2–0

=== Round of 16 ===
First leg games took place on November 8–12, 1989, while most second leg games were played on November 16–18. Three more second leg games were played on March 1, 1990.

Team 1	Agg.	Team 2	1st leg	2nd leg
First leg – November 8, Second leg – November 18
Spartak Moscow (I)	2–2 (a)	(I) Dinamo Minsk	2–1	0–1
First leg – November 8, Second leg – March 1
Dynamo Moscow (I)	2–0	(I) Ararat Yerevan	1–0	1–0
Dynamo Kyiv (I)	+/-	(I) Dinamo Tbilisi	1–0	+/-
First leg – November 9, Second leg – November 16
Shakhtar Donetsk (I)	0–1	(III) Krylia Sovetov Kuibyshev	0–0	0–1
First leg – November 11, Second leg – November 16
Rotor Volgograd (I)	3–4	(II) CSKA Moscow	3–2	0–2
First leg – November 12, Second leg – November 16
Pakhtakor Tashkent (II)	2–3	(I) Metalist Kharkiv	0–3	2–0
First leg – November 12, Second leg – November 17
Zalgiris Vilnius (I)	1–4	(I) Lokomotiv Moscow	1–1	0–3
First leg – November 12, Second leg – March 1
Chornomorets Odesa (I)	1–3	(I) Torpedo Moscow	1–0	0–3

In the beginning of 1990, the Georgian Football Federation has officially left the Football Federation of the Soviet Union and all its clubs left the All-Union competitions. Dinamo Tbilisi which was renamed as Iberia Tbilisi (with reference to the christianization of Iberia) withdrew from the Soviet Union competitions and competed in Georgian competitions only.

=== Quarter-finals ===
All games were scheduled on 20 March 1990, while the game between CSKA and Krylya Sovietov Samara was played a day earlier on 19 March.

Team 1	Score	Team 2
March 19
CSKA Moscow (II→I)	3–1	(III) Krylia Sovetov Kuibyshev
March 20
Lokomotiv Moscow (I→II)	2–0	(I) Torpedo Moscow
Dinamo Minsk (I)	0–0 (4–5 p)	(I) Dinamo Moscow
Metallist Kharkov (I)	0–1	(I) Dinamo Kiev

=== Semi-finals ===
Both games took place on 17 April 1990.

Team 1	Score	Team 2
April 17
Dinamo Moscow (I)	0–0 (2–4 p)	(II) Lokomotiv Moscow
Dinamo Kiev (I)	4–2	(I) CSKA Moscow

=== Final ===
2 May 1990
?:? LST

Lokomotiv Moscow	1–6	Dynamo Kyiv
Mileshkin 52' (pen.)	Report	Mykhailychenko 19'; Rats 30'; Salenko 43', 65', 90'; Lytovchenko 71'

Lenin's Central Stadium, Moscow
Attendance: 15,000
Referee: Ivan Timoshenko (Rostov/Don)
