= Pavel Nesterov =

Russian footballer

Personal information
- Full name: Pavel Aleksandrovich Nesterov
- Date of birth: 8 April 1962
- Place of birth: Krasnogorsk, Russian SFSR
- Date of death: 28 July 2005 (aged 43)
- Place of death: Krasnogorsk, Russia
- Height: 1.84 m (6 ft 1/2 in)
- Positions: Defender; midfielder

Youth career
- PFC CSKA Moscow

Senior career*
Years	Team	Apps	(Gls)
1978–1980	PFC CSKA Moscow	9	(0)
1981–1982	FC Iskra Smolensk	61	(2)
1982–1984	PFC CSKA Moscow	55	(4)
1984–1985	FC Moskvich Moscow (amateur)		
1986–1988	FC Zorkiy Krasnogorsk	68	(4)
1989–1992	FC Lokomotiv Moscow	47	(0)
1992	FC Lokomotiv-d Moscow	12	(0)
1993	FC Neftekhimik Nizhnekamsk	4	(0)
- * Club domestic league appearances and goals

Pavel Aleksandrovich Nesterov (Russian: Павел Александрович Нестеров; born 8 April 1962; died 28 July 2005) was a Russian football player.

== Honours ==
- Soviet Cup finalist: 1990.
