= Viktor Maryenko =

Soviet association football player (1929–2007)

Personal information
- Full name: Viktor Semyonovich Maryenko
- Date of birth: 25 August 1929
- Place of birth: Yasynuvata, Ukrainian SSR, Soviet Union
- Date of death: 9 July 2007 (aged 77)
- Place of death: Petrovskoye, Russia
- Height: 1.76 m (5 ft 9 1/2 in)
- Position: Defender

Senior career*
Years	Team	Apps	(Gls)
1949	FC Lokomotiv Yasynuvata		
1950–1953	FC Shakhtyor Stalino	33	(1)
1954–1959	FC Torpedo Moscow	88	(1)
1960–1962	FC Avangard Kharkov	69	(1)

Managerial career
- 1962–1963: FC Shinnik Yaroslavl (assistant)
- 1963–1964: FC Torpedo Moscow (team director)
- 1965–1967: FC Torpedo Moscow
- 1967–1968: FC Uralmash Sverdlovsk
- 1969–1970: FC Lokomotiv Moscow (team director)
- 1969–1970: FC Lokomotiv Moscow
- 1971–1978: FC Shinnik Yaroslavl
- 1978–1980: FC Lokomotiv Moscow (team director)
- 1978–1980: FC Lokomotiv Moscow
- 1981: FC Torpedo Moscow (academy director)
- 1982–1987: FC Fakel Voronezh
- 1988–1992: FC Torpedo Moscow (academy director)
- * Club domestic league appearances and goals

Viktor Semyonovich Maryenko (Russian: Виктор Семёнович Марьенко; 25 August 1929 in Yasynuvata – 9 July 2007 in Petrovskoye) was a Soviet Ukrainian football player and coach.

== Honours as a coach ==
- Soviet Top League champion: 1965.
