= Igor Volchok =

Russian football player and coach (1931–2016)

Personal information
- Full name: Igor Semyonovich Volchok
- Date of birth: 4 October 1931
- Place of birth: Moscow, Russian SFSR, Soviet Union
- Date of death: 19 April 2016 (aged 84)
- Place of death: Moscow, Russia
- Position: Midfielder

Senior career*
Years	Team	Apps	(Gls)
1950	Torpedo Moscow	0	(0)
1951–1952	CDSA Moscow	0	(0)

Managerial career
- 1958: Avangard Elektrostal
- 1960–1962: Metallurg Dnepropetrovsk (assistant)
- 1962–1963: Trud Noginsk (assistant)
- 1964–1965: Shakhtyor Karaganda (assistant)
- 1966: Shakhtyor Karaganda (director)
- 1967: Zorya Luhansk (assistant)
- 1968–1970: Volga Kalinin
- 1971: Lokomotiv Moscow (director)
- 1972: Lokomotiv Moscow
- 1973–1978: Lokomotiv Moscow
- 1979: Kazakh SSR
- 1979–1981: Kairat
- 1982: Tavriya Simferopol
- 1983–1985: Lokomotiv Moscow
- 1990–1991: Navbahor Namangan
- 1993–1995: Shinnik Yaroslavl
- 1996–1998: Rubin Kazan
- 1998–2000: Avtomobilist Noginsk
- 2001–2002: Yelets
- 2003: Navbahor Namangan
- 2003–2004: Yelets (consultant)
- 2005: Yelets
- * Club domestic league appearances and goals

Igor Semyonovich Volchok (Russian: Игорь Семёнович Волчок; 4 October 1931 – 19 April 2016) was a Russian professional football player and a coach.

== Career ==
Volchok played for Moscow clubs Torpedo (1950) and CDSA (1951–52).

As a manager, Volchok led Rubin Kazan to promotion to the Russian First Division and the 1/16-finals of the Russian Cup (football).

As a coach, famous for the fact that many of his charges later successfully expressed themselves in coaching: Yuri Semin, Vladimir Eshtrekov, Alexander Averyanov, Valery Gazzaev, Givi Nodia, Valery Petrakov, Vladimir Shevchuk, Vitaly Shevchenko, Valery Gladilin, Kurban Berdyev.

== Honours ==
- Honored coach of Russia (1972)
- The two-time Cup winner MSSZH (1974, 1976)
- Bronze medalist of Uzbekistan (2003)
