= Rashid Gallakberov =

Russian footballer

Personal information
- Full name: Rashid Rakhmatulovich Gallakberov
- Date of birth: April 12, 1966 (age 60)
- Place of birth: Moscow, Russian SFSR
- Height: 1.80 m (5 ft 11 in)
- Position: Midfielder

Senior career*
Years	Team	Apps	(Gls)
1983–1984	Lokomotiv Moscow	29	(0)
1985–1986	FShM Moscow	41	(4)
1987–1991	Lokomotiv Moscow	119	(6)
1991	Asmaral Moscow	22	(2)
1992–1993	Tatran Prešov	43	(5)
1994–1996	Saturn Ramenskoye	73	(34)
1997	Gigant Voskresensk		
1998	Spartak-Telekom Shuya	13	(1)
1998	Torpedo Vladimir	11	(0)
1999	Moskabelmet Moscow		
- * Club domestic league appearances and goals

Rashid Rakhmatulovich Gallakberov (Russian: Рашид Рахматулович Галлакберов; born 12 April 1966) is a retired Russian professional footballer.

== Club career ==
He played 3 seasons in the Soviet Top League for Lokomotiv Moscow

== Honours ==
- Soviet Cup finalist: 1990.
