= Rudolf Atamalyan =

Russian footballer and coach (1946–2023)

Personal information
- Full name: Rudolf Sergeyevich Atamalyan
- Date of birth: 5 July 1946
- Place of birth: Baku, Azerbaijani SSR, USSR
- Date of death: 26 March 2023 (aged 76)
- Height: 1.82 m (6 ft 0 in)
- Position: Striker

Senior career*
Years	Team	Apps	(Gls)
1965	Polad Sumgait	28	(7)
1966	Neftyanik Baku	0	(0)
1966–1967	Ararat Yerevan	16	(2)
1968–1972	Lokomotiv Moscow	100	(30)
1972	Uralmash Sverdlovsk	12	(2)
1973–1974	Nistru Chişinău	41	(14)
1975	Neftyanik Tyumen	31	(10)

Managerial career
- 1987: Geolog Tyumen (assistant)
- 1988–1991: Geolog Tyumen
- 1994–1997: Irtysh Tobolsk
- 1999–2000: Tyumen (director)
- 2000: Tyumen
- * Club domestic league appearances and goals

Rudolf Sergeyevich Atamalyan (Armenian: Ռուդոլֆ Սերգեյի Աթամալյան; Russian: Рудольф Серге́евич Атамалян; 5 July 1946 – 26 March 2023) was a Russian professional football coach and player. In 2009, he was coaching 12- to 13-year-old children in a Sochi soccer school.

== Death ==
Atamalyan died on 26 March 2023, at the age of 76.
