= Valeri Novikov =

Soviet footballer

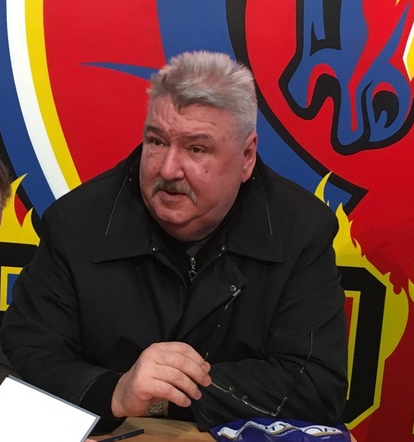

Personal information
- Full name: Valeri Ivanovich Novikov
- Date of birth: 1 November 1957 (age 68)
- Place of birth: Moscow, USSR
- Height: 1.88 m (6 ft 2 in)
- Position: Goalkeeper

Senior career*
Years	Team	Apps	(Gls)
1973–1977	FC Lokomotiv Moscow	14	(0)
1978–1987	CSKA Moscow	257	(0)

International career
1978 – 1984	USSR	2	(0)
- * Club domestic league appearances and goals

Valeri Ivanovich Novikov (Russian: Валерий Иванович Новиков) (born 1 November 1957, in Moscow) is a retired Soviet football player.

== Honours ==
- 1980 UEFA European Under-21 Football Championship winner.

Individual

- Toulon Tournament Best Goalkeeper: 1979

== International career ==
Novikov made his debut for USSR on 5 April 1978 in a friendly against Finland, USSR won 10:2 but Novikov allowed two goals in the 45 minutes that he played. He kept clean sheet in the only other game he played for USSR, 1984 friendly against Mexico.
