= Evgeni Rogov =

Russian footballer

Personal information
- Full name: Evgeni Aleksandrovich Rogov
- Date of birth: 8 April 1929
- Place of birth: Chelyabinsk, Soviet Union
- Date of death: 6 July 1996 (aged 67)
- Place of death: Moscow, Russia
- Position: Defender

Youth career
- 1947–1949: Dzerzhinets Chelyabinsk

Senior career*
| Years | Team | Apps | (Gls) |
| 1950–1952 | VVS Moscow | | |
| 1953–1961 | Lokomotiv Moscow | | |

Managerial career
- 1965: Lokomotiv Moscow
- 1966: USSR youth
- 1970–1972: Lokomotiv Moscow
- 1973–1976: Central African Republic
- 1981–1982: Algeria
- 1986–1988: Algeria
- 1991–1993: WA Mostaganem
- 1995–1996: Raja Casablanca
Medal record
Men's football
Representing Algeria (as manager)
Africa Cup of Nations
| Bronze medal – third place | 1988 |
- * Club domestic league appearances and goals

Evgeni Aleksandrovich Rogov (Russian: Евгений Александрович Рогов; 8 April 1929 – 6 July 1996) was a Russian and Soviet football player and manager.

== Career ==
Rogov was born in Chelyabinsk. He played for VVS Moscow and Lokomotiv Moscow.

He coached Lokomotiv Moscow, Central African Republic and Algeria.

He died aged 67 on 6 July 1996 in Moscow.
