= Ilya Yeremeyev =

Russian footballer (born 2008)

Personal information
- Full name: Ilya Andreyevich Yeremeyev
- Date of birth: 13 July 2008 (age 18)
- Height: 1.84 m (6 ft 0 in)
- Position: Central midfielder

Team information
- Current team: Lokomotiv Moscow
- Number: 75

Youth career
- Lokomotiv Moscow

Senior career*
Years	Team	Apps	(Gls)
2026–	Lokomotiv Moscow	11	(0)

International career^{‡}
2024	Russia U16	4	(0)
2024–2025	Russia U17	4	(0)
2025	Russia U18	5	(0)
2026–	Russia U19	1	(0)
- * Club domestic league appearances and goals as of 25 October 2026 ‡ National team caps and goals as of 9 June 2026

Ilya Andreyevich Yeremeyev (Russian: Илья Андреевич Еремеев; born 13 July 2008) is a Russian football player who plays as a central midfielder for Lokomotiv Moscow.

== Career ==
Yeremeyev was raised in the academy of Lokomotiv Moscow and was moved to the club's senior squad in the summer of 2026. On 21 July 2026, Yeremeyev signed a contract with Lokomotiv running until the end of 2030.

He made his debut in the Russian Premier League for Lokomotiv on 1 August 2026 in a game against Dynamo Makhachkala.

== Career statistics ==
As of 29 October 2026

Club	Season	League			Cup		Total	
Club	Season	Division	Apps	Goals	Apps	Goals	Apps	Goals
Lokomotiv Moscow	2026–27	Russian Premier League	11	0	3	0	14	0
Career total			11	0	3	0	14	0
