= Andrei Fedin =

Russian former professional footballer

Personal information
- Full name: Andrei Dmitriyevich Fedin
- Date of birth: 28 September 1970 (age 56)
- Place of birth: Moscow, Russian SFSR
- Height: 1.80 m (5 ft 11 in)
- Position: Midfielder

Youth career
- FC Torpedo Moscow

Senior career*
Years	Team	Apps	(Gls)
1987	FC Torpedo Moscow	0	(0)
1988–1993	FC Lokomotiv Moscow	68	(2)
1993–1994	FC Tekhinvest-M Moskovsky	44	(11)
1995	FC Shinnik Yaroslavl	30	(2)
1996–1997	FC Arsenal Tula	55	(6)
1998	FC Lokomotiv-2 Moscow	21	(2)
1999–2000	FC Spartak-Chukotka Moscow	50	(3)
- * Club domestic league appearances and goals

Andrei Dmitriyevich Fedin (Russian: Андрей Дмитриевич Федин; born 28 September 1970) is a Russian former professional footballer.

== Club career ==
He made his professional debut in the Soviet Top League in 1988 for FC Lokomotiv Moscow. He played 1 game for FC Torpedo Moscow in the USSR Federation Cup.

== Honours ==
- Soviet Cup finalist: 1990.
