= Andrei Solovtsov =

Russian footballer

Personal information
- Full name: Andrei Yevgenyevich Solovtsov
- Date of birth: 17 October 1967 (age 59)
- Place of birth: Moscow, Russia
- Height: 1.82 m (6 ft 0 in)
- Position: Defender

Youth career
- FShM Moscow

Senior career*
Years	Team	Apps	(Gls)
1984–1985	FC Lokomotiv Moscow	19	(0)
1986	FC Iskra Smolensk	18	(0)
1987	PFC CSKA-2 Moscow	30	(0)
1988–1992	FC Lokomotiv Moscow	79	(0)
1993–1998	FC Shinnik Yaroslavl	176	(2)
- * Club domestic league appearances and goals

Andrei Yevgenyevich Solovtsov (Russian: Андрей Евгеньевич Соловцов; born 17 October 1967) is a former Russian professional footballer.

== Club career ==
He made his professional debut in the Soviet First League in 1984 for FC Lokomotiv Moscow. He played 1 game in the UEFA Intertoto Cup 1998 for FC Shinnik Yaroslavl.

== Honours ==
- Soviet Cup finalist: 1990.
