= Sergei Sukhov =

Russian footballer

Personal information
- Full name: Sergei Mikhailovich Sukhov
- Date of birth: 17 November 1965 (age 60)
- Place of birth: Moscow, Russian SFSR
- Height: 1.81 m (5 ft 11 1/2 in)
- Position: Forward

Youth career
- FC Dynamo Moscow

Senior career*
Years	Team	Apps	(Gls)
1984–1985	FC Shinnik Yaroslavl	0	(0)
1986–1988	FC Saturn Andropov	92	(26)
1989	FC Dynamo-2 Moscow	10	(5)
1989	FC Arsenal Tula	21	(10)
1989	FC Spartak Moscow	0	(0)
1990	FC Lokomotiv Moscow	35	(11)
1991	FC Terek Grozny	40	(10)
1992	FC Rotor Volgograd	9	(4)
1992–1993	FC Avangard Kolomna	53	(17)
1994–1996	FC Spartak Shchyolkovo	40	(13)
1996	FC Avangard-Kortek Kolomna	14	(1)
1997	FC Gigant Voskresensk (amateur)		
1999–2001	FC Meteor Zhukovsky		
- * Club domestic league appearances and goals

Sergei Mikhailovich Sukhov (Russian: Серге́й Михайлович Сухов; born 17 November 1965) is a former Russian professional footballer.

== Club career ==
He made his professional debut in the Soviet Second League in 1986 for FC Saturn Andropov.

== Honours ==
- Soviet Cup finalist: 1990.
