= Yevgeny Mileshkin =

Russian footballer

Personal information
- Full name: Yevgeny Yuryevich Mileshkin
- Date of birth: 3 September 1960 (age 66)
- Place of birth: Moscow, Russian SFSR
- Height: 1.81 m (5 ft 11 1/2 in)
- Position: Defender

Youth career
- FShM Moscow

Senior career*
Years	Team	Apps	(Gls)
1978–1982	FC Lokomotiv Moscow	27	(0)
1983	FC Spartak Moscow	29	(1)
1984	FC Dynamo Moscow	14	(1)
1985–1991	FC Lokomotiv Moscow	189	(8)
1991–1992	Polonia Warsaw	20	(0)
1992	FC Volgar Astrakhan	21	(0)
1993	PK-37	19	(0)
1994	FC Shinnik Yaroslavl	7	(0)

Managerial career
- 2007: FC Dynamo Moscow (deputy general director)
- 2008: FC Dynamo Moscow (director of sports)
- * Club domestic league appearances and goals

Yevgeny Yuryevich Mileshkin (Russian: Евгений Юрьевич Милешкин; born 3 September 1960) is a former Russian professional footballer.

== Honours ==
- Soviet Top League runner-up: 1983.
- Soviet Cup finalist: 1990.
