= Vasyl Rats =

Ukrainian former football midfielder (born 1961)

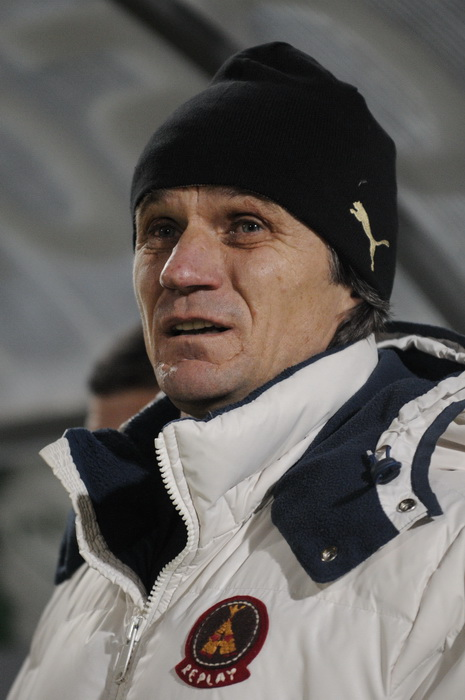

Personal information
- Full name: Vasyl Karlovych Rats
- Date of birth: 25 March 1961 (age 65)
- Place of birth: Fanchykovo, Ukrainian SSR, Soviet Union
- Height: 1.75 m (5 ft 9 in)
- Position: Midfielder

Youth career
- 1976: LDUFK Lviv

Senior career*
| Years | Team | Apps | (Gls) |
| 1979–1980 | FC Karpaty Lviv | 5 | (0) |
| 1980–1981 | Lokomotiv Vinnytsia | 39 | (4) |
| 1981–1989 | FC Dynamo Kyiv | 164 | (22) |
| 1989 | RCD Espanyol | 10 | (0) |
| 1989–1990 | FC Dynamo Kyiv | 21 | (2) |
| 1991–1993 | Ferencvárosi TC | 7 | (1) |

International career
| 1979 | Ukrainian SSR | | |
| | USSR U-21 | 1 | (0) |
| 1986 | USSR Olympic | 1 | (0) |
| 1986 | USSR 'B' | 5 | (1) |
| 1986–1990 | USSR | 47 | (4) |

Managerial career
- 1996–1997: Ferencvárosi TC (assistant)
- 2007: FC Dynamo Kyiv (assistant)
- 2011: Obolon Kyiv (U-21)
- 2011: Obolon Kyiv
Medal record
Men's football
Representing Soviet Union
UEFA Euro
| Runner-up | 1988 West Germany |
- * Club domestic league appearances and goals

Vasyl Karlovych Rats (Ukrainian: Василь Карлович Рац; Hungarian: Rácz László) (born 25 March 1961) is a Ukrainian former football midfielder. He participated in two World Cups and one European Championship with the Soviet Union national football team.

== Club career ==
After the seventh grade (around age 14), Rats enrolled into a sports vocational school (boarding school) and later a sports university (both in Lviv). At the same time Rats was playing for Karpaty reserves. His first coach was Ernest Yust. Rats considered that it was difficult to gain adequate playtime along with such players like Susloparov, Bal, Brovarskyi, Dumanskyi, Dubrovnyi. So, when in 1979 a manager of Nyva Vinnytsia Ivan Terletskyi offered him to join, he agreed gladly and was happy to play at the third tier consistently rather than to remain a substitute at the top tier. In 1981 Rats was receiving invitations from Tashkent, Zaporizhia, Donetsk, but Terletskyi was not let him go by telling that those team are not for him. Soon there appeared a scout from Dynamo Kyiv and Rats was transferred out.

Rats had some difficulties at first to make the first team and was trying to return to Vinnytsia. He finally made his debut at the Soviet Top League on 8 November 1981 in away game against Dynamo Moscow which the Kyiv team lost, but the team already secured the championship title. In 1983 Valeriy Lobanovskyi was replaced by Yuriy Morozov and Rats only played one match for the first team and was thinking to leave the club. Around that time a manager of Spartak Moscow Konstantin Beskov offered him to move to Spartak and Rats was about to do so, but Lobanovskyi who just returned talked him out of it by saying that he may also stay on bench at the new club. Also in convincing Rats to stay in Kyiv, a native of Zakarpattia Oblast Mykhaylo Koman played an important role.

Rats played several seasons with FC Dynamo Kyiv, where he won the Soviet Top League four times.

The most notable was the 1986 season when Dynamo Kyiv managed to out-play Dynamo Moscow which then was coached by Eduard Malofeyev. The goal of Rats in Moscow in last 15 minutes of play tied the game and at home the Kyiv team beat Muscovites 2-1.

Before moving to Ferencvaros in 1991, Rats had a medical emergency when his whole left side of body became incapacitated. He eventually spoke about his condition to the Hungarian club administration, and they helped out with medical treatment and Rats was ready for the season.

== International career ==
Rats earned 47 caps and scored 4 goals for the USSR, from 1986 to 1990. He played in two World Cups, in 1986 and 1990. In the 1986 World Cup he scored a goal with a 27-meter shot against France in a 1–1 draw in the first round: a headed clearance by France was picked up by Ihor Belanov and laid off to Rats, who on the first touch, struck the ball powerfully from several yards outside the area past French goalkeeper Joël Bats and into the top right corner of the net. During Euro 1988 his goal secured USSR a 1–0 victory in the group stage over eventual champions The Netherlands. USSR reached the final, but were unable to repeat their achievement in the group stage and lost 2–0.

== Honours ==
- Soviet Top League
  - Winner (4): 1981, 1985, 1986, 1990
  - Runner-up (2): 1982, 1988
- Soviet Cup (4): 1982, 1985, 1987, 1990
- Soviet Super Cup (2): 1986, 1987
- Nemzeti Bajnokság I
  - Winner (1): 1991–92
- Magyar Kupa (2): 1990–91, 1992–93
- UEFA Cup Winners' Cup: 1986
- UEFA Euro 1988 Runner-up: 1988

== Personal life ==
Vasyl Rats grew up as a Hungarian-speaking person in the Soviet Union and experienced some difficulties integrating into the Russian culture which dominated in the Ukrainian SSR. In interview with Dmytro Gordon Vasyl Rats said that Andriy Bal who was a native of Lviv region helped him with integration into FC Dynamo Kyiv.

Vasyl Rats was married to a daughter of Ishtvan Sekech.

Andriy Bal gave Rats the nickname "Klyushka" (bandy). Rats was a fan of French footballer Michel Platini.
