= Vladimir Eshtrekov =

Russian footballer (born 1947)

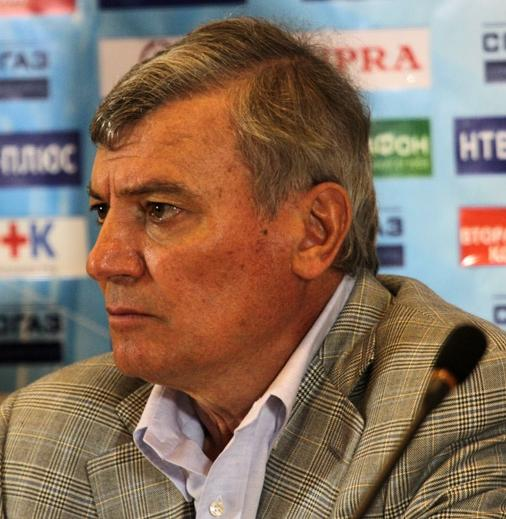

Personal information
- Full name: Vladimir Khazrailovich Eshtrekov
- Date of birth: 16 May 1947 (age 79)
- Place of birth: Nalchik, Russian SFSR, Soviet Union
- Height: 1.70 m (5 ft 7 in)
- Position: Forward

Youth career
- Spartak Nalchik

Senior career*
Years	Team	Apps	(Gls)
1965	Spartak Moscow	8	(1)
1966–1967	Spartak Nalchik		
1968–1973	Dynamo Moscow	102	(11)
1974	Dinamo Minsk	18	(2)
1975–1977	Lokomotiv Moscow	53	(5)
1978	Dynamo Vologda	37	(8)

International career
1971	USSR	2	(0)

Managerial career
- 1981–1982: Druzhba Maykop
- 1983–1989: Spartak Nalchik
- 1989–1991: Constantine
- 1992–2005: Lokomotiv Moscow (assistant)
- 2005: Lokomotiv Moscow
- 2006: Lokomotiv Moscow (athletic director)
- 2006: Lokomotiv Moscow (assistant)
- 2009: MVD Rossii Moscow
- 2011: Spartak Nalchik
- * Club domestic league appearances and goals

Vladimir Khazrailovich Eshtrekov (Russian: Владимир Хазраилович Эштреков; born 16 May 1947) is a Russian football manager and former Soviet international player. He played 163 games in the USSR championships and scored 17 goals.

== Honours ==
- Soviet Cup winner: 1970

=== As a head coach ===
- Russian Premier League bronze: 2005

== International career ==
Eshtrekov made his debut for USSR on 17 February 1971 in a friendly against Mexico.
