= Petrovskoye, Yaroslavl Oblast =

Petrovskoye Петровское
- Urban-type settlement

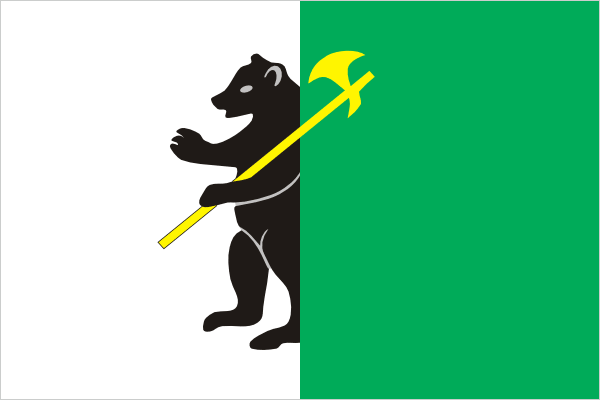
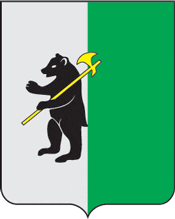
- Flag Coat of arms
- Interactive map of Petrovskoye
- Location of Petrovskoye Petrovskoye (Europe) Petrovskoye (Russia)
- Coordinates: 57°00′N 39°16′E
- Country: Russia
- Federal subject: Yaroslavl Oblast
- Administrative district: Rostovsky District

Population (2010 Census)
  - Total: 4,875
  - Estimate (1 January 2018): 4,590 (−5.8%)
- Time zone: UTC+3 (MSK)
- Postal code: 152130
- OKTMO ID: 78637441051

Petrovskoye (Russian: Петро́вское) is an urban locality (a work settlement) in Rostovsky District of Yaroslavl Oblast, Russia, situated on a major highway leading from Moscow to the Russian North, about halfway between the towns of Rostov and Pereslavl-Zalessky. Population: 4,875 (2010 census); 5,438 (2002 census); 5,635 (1989 Soviet census).

== History ==
It was first mentioned in a chronicle at 1207. It was granted a town status and renamed Petrovsk in 1777. By the mid-20th century the settlement declined, was demoted in status to that of a rural locality and renamed Petrovskoye. It was granted urban-type settlement status in 1943.
