= FC Lokomotiv Moscow =

Russian professional football club

Lokomotiv Moscow
- Full name: Футбольный клуб "Локомотив" Москва (Football Club Lokomotiv Moscow)
- Nicknames: Loko; Parovozy (Steam Locomotive/s); Krasno-Zelenie (The Red-Greens); Zheleznodorozhniki (Railwaymen)
- Founded: 23 July 1922; 104 years ago
- Ground: RZD Arena
- Capacity: 27,320
- Owner: Russian Railways
- General director: Vladimir Leonchenko
- Head coach: Sergei Ovchinnikov (caretaker)
- League: Russian Premier League
- 2025–26: Russian Premier League, 3rd of 16
- Website: fclm.ru
Home colours	Away colours	Third colours

FC Lokomotiv Moscow (Russian: Футбольный клуб "Локомотив" Москва, romanized: Futbol'nyy klub "Lokomotiv" Moskva, IPA: [fʊdˈbolʲnɨj ˈklup ləkəmɐˈtʲif mɐˈskva]) is a Russian professional football club based in Moscow. Lokomotiv have won the Russian Premier League on three occasions; the Soviet Cup twice; and the Russian Cup a record nine times. After the 2022 Russian invasion of Ukraine, the European Club Association suspended all Russian teams from participation in international competition.

== History ==
=== Early years ===
Lokomotiv was founded as Kazanka (Moskovsko-Kazanskaya Zh.D) in 1922. In 1924, the club brought together the strongest football players of several lines of the Moscow railway system as KOR ("Club of the October Revolution"). In 1931, the club was again renamed to Kazanka (Moskovskaya-Kazanskaya Zh.D) and in 1936, it was eventually renamed to as it is known today, Lokomotiv (the name means "Locomotive"). During the Communist rule, Lokomotiv Moscow club was a part of the Lokomotiv Voluntary Sports Society and was owned by the Soviet Ministry of Transportation through the Russian Railways.

=== Soviet era ===
Lokomotiv Moscow in final 1936

When the Lokomotiv Voluntary Sports Society was created in 1936, its football team featured the best players of Kazanka, and a number of strong Soviet footballers of that time such as Valentin Granatkin, Nikolay llyin, Alexey Sokolov, Pyotr Terenkov, Mikhail Zhukov, llya Gvozdkov and Ivan Andreev. Lokomotiv debuted in the first-ever Soviet football club championship with a game against Dynamo Leningrad on 22 May 1936. In the first two seasonal championships (spring and autumn), Lokomotiv finished fifth and fourth respectively. The first Lokomotiv success arrived shortly as in 1936, the railwaymen rose up to the occasion to beat Dynamo Tbilisi 2–0 in the Soviet Cup Final, thus winning the first Soviet Cup.

Lokomotiv Moscow in final 1957

The following years were rather successful as Lokomotiv were consistent in the national championships. However, performances after World War II suffered and in a five-year span, Lokomotiv were relegated to the Soviet First League twice. In 1951, Lokomotiv came second and eventually won the promotion to the Soviet Top League. This kicked off the second Lokomotiv's resurgence and until the beginning of the 1960s, Lokomotiv competed for the USSR's top trophies. In 1957, Lokomotiv won the cup for the second time, and two years later, Lokomotiv won the silver medals of the Soviet League. Second place was the highest position ever obtained by Lokomotiv during the Soviet era.

Another important trademark for Lokomotiv was the authorization of playing friendly matches against foreign opposition. Typically, up to the late 1950s, international sports contacts with Soviet teams were extremely rare. However, since in 1955, Lokomotiv became a quasi-"football ambassador" for the Soviet Union abroad, participating in friendly matches in various parts of the world, including Europe, Asia, Africa and even North America. This policy of openness ushered in a great era for Lokomotiv, with the squad including some of the finest Soviet footballers of the era, such as Vladimir Maslachenko, Valentin Bubukin, Victor Voroshilov, Zaur Kaloyev, and Yuri Kovalyov. When Lokomotiv's strongest players abandoned the club, however, Lokomotiv fell again from grace and a swing between the first and second divisions followed, instability lasting until the end of the 1980s.

=== Post-Soviet era ===
In the beginning of the 1990s, Lokomotiv was considered the "weakest link" amongst the top Moscow clubs. It lacked both results on the pitch and fans' support in the stands. In 2002, a new stadium—Lokomotiv Stadium—resembling a traditional, compact English one was built.

In 2002, a "golden match" was needed to decide who will be the champion, as Lokomotiv Moscow and CSKA Moscow both finished with the same number of points after Gameweek 30. The game was played at Dynamo Stadium in front of a sold-out crowd. Lokomotiv took an early lead thanks a low drive from captain Dmitry Loskov, and eventually the goal turned out to be enough for Lokomotiv to claim the first title in the club's history.

Two years later, Lokomotiv again won the Russian Premier League, edging city rivals CSKA by a single point; Lokomotiv defeated Shinnik Yaroslavl 0–2 in Yaroslavl, a week after CSKA fell to city rivals Dynamo at home.

In 2005, long-time head coach Yuri Semin left the team to coach the Russian national team, where he was replaced at Lokomotiv by Vladimir Eshtrekov. During the same year, although leading the league for most of the year, Lokomotiv stumbled in the last games of the campaign, allowing CSKA overtake them and claim the title, with Lokomotiv ultimately falling to third. Estrekhov was later sacked and replaced by Slavoljub Muslin, the first foreign manager in the club's history. After a poor start to the new season, Lokomotiv recovered and finished third, but despite the respectable performance, Muslin was sacked; Anatoly Byshovets took the helm as his replacement, with Yury Semin returning to serve as team president. This brought little success to Lokomotiv, who finished the season in seventh, with the only bright spot being the victory of the Russian Cup. These poor performances prompted the board of directors to sack both coach Anatoly Byshovets and President Semin. Rinat Bilyaletdinov was subsequently named caretaker coach. This lasted until 6 December 2006, when Lokomotiv brought in Rashid Rakhimov from Amkar Perm on a three-year contract. Again, however, this resulted to be yet another poor decision from the board, as Lokomotiv only finished seventh in 2008, also beginning the 2009 season poorly. Unsurprisingly, on 28 April 2009, Lokomotiv fired Rakhimov; long-serving player Vladimir Maminov was installed as a caretaker manager. A month later, Semin was brought back to the club to take charge. After a really poor start, Lokomotiv recovered and finished the season on a high, claiming fourth place in the process.

In 2010 shortly after the signing of former Lokomotiv player Peter Odemwingie to West Bromwich Albion, photographs showed Lokomotiv Moscow fans celebrating the sale of Odemwingie through the use of racist banners targeted at the player. One banner included the image of a banana and read "Thanks West Brom". Before West Brom's game against Tottenham Hotspur in September 2010, it was announced that West Brom fans would unfurl a banner to counter the racist one, the banner read 'Thanks Lokomotiv' and is accompanied by a picture of Odemwingie celebrating his win on his debut against Sunderland.

Before the 2011–12 league season, Semin left the club and was replaced by former Spartak Nalchuk manager Yuri Krasnozhan. On 4 June 2011, rumours spread that Lokomotiv chairman Olga Smorodskaya suspected Krasnozhan of throwing away the 27 May, 1–2 home league defeat to Anzhi Makhachkala, deciding to sack him on the grounds of the suspicion. Lokomotiv was fifth in the table at the time, just one point away from first-placed CSKA. On 6 July, after a Lokomotiv Committee of Directors meeting, Krasnozhan's contract was officially terminated on the basis of "negligence in his job." The Russian Football Union subsequently refused to investigate the case. Assistant manager Maminov again took over as caretaker for three weeks until a replacement was found in the form of José Couceiro, who had himself just finished a caretaking stint as manager of Sporting Clube de Portugal.

Couceiro, however, lasted just one year in the role, as the club opted not to renew his contract at the end of the 2011–12 season. After Croatia national team head coach Slaven Bilić announced he would step down after his nation's participation at Euro 2012, Loko acted quickly to sign him to a three-year contract. However, Bilić's first season at the helm brought another disappointment, as Loko finished ninth, its lowest-ever finish in the post-Soviet era of Russian domestic football. Just prior to the 2013–14 season, Bilić was sacked and replaced with new head coach Leonid Kuchuk. Eventually, however, Lokomotiv ran out of steam and after only managing to win a single points from the last three matches of the season, Lokomotiv had to settle for the third place.

=== Recent history ===
In the following season, Kuchuk failed to build up on the improved performances of the previous season and with Lokomotiv languished at the ninth place, Kuchuk was given the sack prematurely. Miodrag Božović was called to steady the ship but despite the early promise, a disastrous run of one win in a stretch of nine matches resulted in Božović being sacked with three league matches to go and with Igor Cherevchenko re-appointed as caretaker manager for the second time during the season. Despite the poor league performance, wherein Lokomotiv placed in the 7th place again, Lokomotiv did end the season on a positive tone as Cherevchenko managed to rally his troops and win the Russian Cup with a 3–1 win over Kuban Krasnodar. This success, which brought the first piece of silverware to Lokomotiv in 8 years, was enough to convince Olga Smorodskaya to appoint Cherevchenko on a permanent basis. Lokomotiv's performances under Cherechenko did improve in the beginning but it was a false promise once again as in the end Lokomotiv faltered and did not manage to qualify for European football. Notwithstanding this, Cherevchenko was confirmed for the 2016–17 season.

After months of speculation, and with only two games in the new season, the board pulled the plug on Smorodskaya's disastrous tenure and relieved Smorodskaya hand Cherechenko from their positions. Ilya Herkus was brought in for Smorodskaya and with the goal of resolving the previous board's fractious relationship with the fans and bring them back to the stadium, Lokomotiv appointed Yury Semin as their manager for the fourth time. In also came crowd favourite Dmitri Loskov, who was assigned to assist Semin with his duties. Despite the good feelings brought by the change in management, Lokomotiv's performances seldom improved and a tumultuous season ended up in Lokomotiv placing in a disappointing eighth position. In what was the only highlight of the season, Lokomotiv managed to snatch the Russian Cup for a joint record seventh time by crushing Ural Yekaterinburg's dreams of their first ever piece of silverware with a two-nil victory.

Despite the average league performance, Semin was confirmed for the next season. Herkus' decision to retain Semin resulted to be a shrewd decision as Semin managed to do the unthinkable and rallied Lokomotiv to win the Russian Premier League for only the third time in their history. In Europe, Lokomotiv also performed admirably, as they managed to advance to Round of 16 for the first time in their history and got eliminated by Atlético Madrid, who eventually went on to win the Cup.

After the 2022 Russian invasion of Ukraine, the European Club Association suspended the team.

César Montes was selected to represent Mexico at the 2026 FIFA World Cup. He started the tournament opener against South Africa and was sent-off late in the game.

== Performances in Europe ==
Lokomotiv reached the Cup Winners' Cup semi-final twice, in 1997–98 and 1998–99. The club also played in the UEFA Champions League for the 2002–03 and 2003–04 seasons, progressing past the group stage in the latter only to fall to eventual finalists AS Monaco in the round of 16. They qualified to the group stages again for the 2019–20 season.

== Players ==
=== Current squad ===
As of 10 September 2026

Note: Flags indicate national team as defined under FIFA eligibility rules; some limited exceptions apply. Players may hold more than one non-FIFA nationality.

No.	Pos.	Nation	Player
1	GK	RUS	Anton Mitryushkin
2	DF	ECU	Cristian Ramírez
3	DF	BRA	Lucas Fasson
5	DF	CMR	Gerzino Nyamsi
6	MF	RUS	Sergei Babkin
7	MF	RUS	Zelimkhan Bakayev
8	MF	RUS	Aleksandr Kovalenko (on loan from Sochi)
9	FW	RUS	Sergei Pinyayev
11	FW	RUS	Vadim Rakov
14	DF	RUS	Georgi Dzhikiya
16	GK	RUS	Daniil Veselov
18	MF	RUS	Nikolai Titkov
19	FW	RUS	Aleksandr Rudenko
22	GK	RUS	Ilya Lantratov

No.	Pos.	Nation	Player
23	DF	MEX	César Montes
24	DF	RUS	Maksim Nenakhov
27	FW	RUS	Nikolay Komlichenko
32	MF	ARG	Lucas Vera
45	DF	RUS	Aleksandr Silyanov
47	MF	RUS	Danila Godyayev
59	DF	RUS	Yegor Pogostnov
63	FW	RUS	Vladislav Golubev
74	DF	RUS	Daniil Chevardin
75	DF	RUS	Ilya Yeremeyev
77	MF	RUS	Andrei Mostovoy (on loan from Zenit St. Petersburg)
85	DF	RUS	Yevgeny Morozov
88	MF	RUS	Mikhail Shchetinin
99	FW	BLR	Ruslan Myalkovsky

=== Out on loan ===
Note: Flags indicate national team as defined under FIFA eligibility rules; some limited exceptions apply. Players may hold more than one non-FIFA nationality.

No.	Pos.	Nation	Player
—	GK	RUS	Timofey Mitrov (at Sochi until 30 June 2027)
—	DF	BLR	Arseny Ageyev (at Torpedo-BelAZ Zhodino until 31 December 2026)
—	MF	RUS	Artyom Korneyev (at Tekstilshchik Ivanovo until 30 June 2027)

No.	Pos.	Nation	Player
—	MF	RUS	Nikita Saltykov (at Krylia Sovetov Samara until 30 June 2027)
—	FW	RUS	Dmitry Radikovsky (at Neman Grodno until 31 December 2026)
—	FW	BLR	Aleksandr Frantsuzov (at Torpedo-BelAZ Zhodino until 31 December 2026)

== Honours ==
=== Domestic competitions ===
==== Leagues ====
- Soviet Top League / Russian Premier League
  - Winners (3): 2002, 2004, 2017–18
  - Runners-up (7): 1959, 1995, 1999, 2000, 2001, 2018–19, 2019–20
- Soviet First League / Russian National Football League
  - Winners (3): 1947, 1964, 1974
  - Runners-up (2): 1971, 1987

==== Cups ====
- Soviet Cup / Russian Cup
  - Winners (11): 1936, 1957, 1995–96, 1996–97, 1999–2000, 2000–01, 2006–07, 2014–15, 2016–17, 2018–19, 2020–21
  - Runners-up (2): 1989–90, 1997–98
- Soviet Super Cup / Russian Super Cup
  - Winners (3): 2003, 2005, 2019
  - Runners-up (6): 2008, 2015, 2017, 2018, 2020, 2021

=== International competitions ===
- UEFA Cup Winners' Cup
  - Semi-finalists (2): 1997–98, 1998–99
- Commonwealth of Independent States Cup
  - Winners: 2005
- European Railways Cup
  - Winners (5) (record): 1974, 1976, 1979, 1983, 1987

== Stadium ==
Lokomotiv play their home games at RZD Arena. Its total seating capacity is 27,320 seats, all covered. The stadium was opened after reconstruction in 2002.

== Reserves and academy ==
During the Soviet era, the reserve team of Lokomotiv played in the reserve tournaments for teams of the Top (runners-up in 1953, 1965; third place in 1954, 1956) and First (third place in 1974) leagues.

In the 1930s, the "Lokomotiv-II" team participated in the Soviet Cup (1936, 1937, 1938) and the RSFSR Cup among physical culture clubs (KFK), Moscow zone (1939). The "Lokomotiv-klubnaya" team played in the Moscow Championship (1936, 1937, 1938, 1940) as well as the RSFSR Cup among KFK, Moscow zone (1940).

Between 1992 and 2000, Lokomotiv's reserve team played under the names "Lokomotiv-d" and "Lokomotiv-2" in the Russian lower divisions (in 1992–1993 and 1998–2000 in the Second League, and in 1994–1997 in the Third League), and also competed in the first two editions of the Russian Cup. Following the establishment of the youth championship in 2001 (from 2008 known as the Russian Premier League Youth Championship), the team has competed there, winning titles in 2011, 2015/16 and 2023, finishing as runners-up in 2008, and taking third place in 2019/20.

In 2008, a separate "Lokomotiv-2" team was formed. In the 2008 season, it finished third in the Moscow zone of the Russian LFK Championship (Amateur Football League), and in subsequent seasons (2009–2013/14) it competed in the West zone of the Russian Second Division / PFL (finishing third in 2010). From the 2016/17 to 2021/22 seasons, Lokomotiv's farm club Lokomotiv-Kazanka played in the PFL (runners-up in 2018/19, third place in 2017/18).

The club is also represented by an amateur youth team in the Third Division competitions (finishing second in the Moscow zone in 2014).

== Ownerships, kit suppliers, and Sponsors ==
Period	Kit manufacturers	Period	Sponsors	Owner
1936—1992	?	—	—	Lokomotiv society
1989	Adidas	—	—	Lokomotiv society
1990—1992	Score	—	—	Ministry of Railways of the Russian Federation
1993	Patrick	1993	Victor	Ministry of Railways of the Russian Federation
1993	Adidas	1993	Galleano Transport	Ministry of Railways of the Russian Federation
1994	Umbro	1994	El Campero	Ministry of Railways of the Russian Federation
1995—1999	Puma	1995	El Campero	Ministry of Railways of the Russian Federation
1995—1999	Puma	1995—1996	Samsung	Ministry of Railways of the Russian Federation
1995—1999	Puma	1997—1999	TransRail	Ministry of Railways of the Russian Federation
2000	Diadora	2000	Russian Railways	Russian Railways
2001	Puma	2001	Russian Railways	Russian Railways
2002—2004	Nike	2002—2003	Moscow Railways	Russian Railways
2002—2004	Nike	2004	Russian Railways	Russian Railways
2005—2010	Adidas	2005—	Russian Railways	Russian Railways
2011—2014	Puma	2005—	Russian Railways	Russian Railways
2014—2018	Adidas	2005—	Russian Railways	Russian Railways
2018—2020	Under Armour	2005—	Russian Railways	Russian Railways
2020—2022	Adidas	2005—	Russian Railways	Russian Railways

== League and Cup history ==
=== Soviet Union ===
Season	Div.	Pos.	Pl.	W	D	L	GS	GA	P	Cup	Top scorer (league)	Head coach
1936 (s)	1st	5	6	2	0	4	7	11	10	—	(Soviet Union) Lavrov – 3	(Soviet Union) Stolyarov
1936 (a)	1st	4	7	4	0	3	18	14	15	W	(Soviet Union) Lavrov – 6	(Soviet Union) Stolyarov
1937	1st	6	16	5	5	6	18	20	31	SF	(Soviet Union) Andriasyan – 6	(France) Limbeck
1938	1st	8	25	12	6	7	44	37	30	R64	(Soviet Union) Lavrov – 11	(Soviet Union) Sushkov
1939	1st	5	26	12	6	8	42	39	30	R16	(Soviet Union) Lakhonin – 8	(Soviet Union) Sushkov
1940	1st	6	24	10	5	9	36	52	25	—	(Soviet Union) Kireev – 8 (Soviet Union) Kartsev – 8	(Soviet Union) Sushkov
1944	1st	no competition								R16		
1945	1st	12	22	1	3	18	14	54	5	R32	(Soviet Union) Lakhonin – 4	(Soviet Union) Sushkov
1946	2nd, "South"	7	24	10	6	8	46	33	26	—		
1947	2nd, "Centre"	1	28	21	3	4	56	22	45	Qual.		
1947	2nd, Final	1	5	4	1	0	11	4	9	Qual.		
1948	1st	7	26	10	4	12	38	64	24	R16	(Soviet Union) Obotov – 17	(Soviet Union) Apukhtin (Soviet Union) Maksimov
1949	1st	11	34	11	8	15	59	56	30	R64	(Soviet Union) Lagutin – 13	(Soviet Union) Maksimov (Soviet Union) Kachalin
1950	1st	15	36	11	8	17	41	73	30	QF	(Soviet Union) Panfilov – 14	(Soviet Union) Kachalin
1951	2nd	3	34	19	10	5	72	38	48	R64		(Soviet Union) Kachalin
1952	1st	9	13	5	2	6	19	21	12	R16	(Soviet Union) Panfilov – 4 (Soviet Union) I.Petrov – 4	(Soviet Union) Kachalin (Soviet Union) Arkadyev
1953	1st	6	20	6	6	8	21	28	18	SF	(Soviet Union) Korotkov – 5	(Soviet Union) Arkadyev
1954	1st	10	24	7	7	10	21	23	21	R16	(Soviet Union) Goryansky – 6	(Soviet Union) Arkadyev
1955	1st	5	22	9	7	6	32	27	25	SF	(Soviet Union) Razumovsky – 9	(Soviet Union) Arkadyev
1956	1st	10	22	5	8	9	38	28	18	—	(Soviet Union) Sokolov – 9	(Soviet Union) Arkadyev
1957	1st	4	22	12	4	6	39	27	28	W	(Soviet Union) Sokolov – 12	(Soviet Union) Arkadyev
1958	1st	5	22	9	6	7	48	34	24	SF	(Soviet Union) Voroshilov – 10	(Soviet Union) Eliseev
1959	1st	2	22	12	5	5	42	25	29	—	(Soviet Union) Sokolov – 14	(Soviet Union) Eliseev
1960	1st	5	30	14	6	10	45	46	34	R32	(Soviet Union) Sokolov – 16	(Soviet Union) Morozov
1961	1st	5	30	13	12	5	58	42	38	QF	(Soviet Union) Voroshilov – 20	(Soviet Union) Morozov
1962	1st	13	30	8	9	13	38	45	27	R32	(Soviet Union) Latyshev – 8	(Soviet Union) Morozov (Soviet Union) A. Kostylev
1963	1st	17	38	5	19	14	37	54	29	R32	(Soviet Union) Syagin – 8 (Soviet Union) Spiridonov – 8	(Soviet Union) Arkadyev
1964	2nd	1	40	19	15	6	45	30	53	R32	(Soviet Union) Bubukin – 14	(Soviet Union) Arkadyev
1965	1st	15	32	8	8	16	37	48	24	R16	(Soviet Union) Gorshkov – 13	(Soviet Union) Arkadyev (Soviet Union) Rogov
1966	1st	17	36	11	5	20	34	49	27	R32	(Soviet Union) V. Kozlov – 14	(Soviet Union) Beskov (Soviet Union) Bubukin
1967	1st	17	36	7	14	15	33	37	28	QF	(Soviet Union) Kokh – 9	(Soviet Union) Bubukin
1968	1st	10	38	10	17	11	35	39	37	R32	(Soviet Union) Kokh – 10	(Soviet Union) Bubukin
1969	1st	18	34	8	9	17	33	47	25	R32	(Soviet Union) Atamalyan – 8	(Soviet Union) Maryenko
1970	2nd	4	42	20	10	12	53	39	50	R32	(Soviet Union) Atamalyan – 14	(Soviet Union) Maryenko (Soviet Union) Rogov
1971	2nd	2	42	25	12	5	81	33	62	R32	(Soviet Union) A. Kozlov – 22	(Soviet Union) Rogov
1972	1st	15	30	6	9	15	29	48	21	QF	(Soviet Union) Y. Chesnokov – 8 (Soviet Union) Piskunov – 8	(Soviet Union) Rogov (Soviet Union) Volchok
1973	2nd	3	38	20	8	10	47	32	46	R32	(Soviet Union) Y. Chesnokov – 14	(Soviet Union) Yakushin (Soviet Union) Volchok
1974	2nd	1	38	23	7	8	73	33	53	R32	(Soviet Union) Y. Chesnokov – 20	(Soviet Union) Volchok
1975	1st	11	30	7	12	11	28	33	26	QF	5x players – 4	(Soviet Union) Volchok
1976 (s)	1st	15	15	3	3	9	17	23	9	—	3x players – 3	(Soviet Union) Volchok
1976 (a)	1st	8	15	6	3	6	13	13	15	R16	(Soviet Union) Averyanov – 3 (Soviet Union) Nodiya – 3	(Soviet Union) Volchok
1977	1st	6	30	9	14	7	27	25	32	R32	(Soviet Union) Nodiya – 5	(Soviet Union) Volchok
1978	1st	15	30	7	9	14	26	40	22	SF	(Soviet Union) V. Gazzaev – 6	(Soviet Union) Volchok, from 27 August (Soviet Union) Maryenko
1979	1st	12	34	8	12	14	44	57	24	GS	(Soviet Union) Petrakov – 17	(Soviet Union) Maryenko
1980	1st	18	34	8	9	17	34	44	25	GS	(Soviet Union) Petrakov – 12	(Soviet Union) Maryenko
1981	2nd	3	46	21	15	10	65	41	54	R16	(Soviet Union) Mukhanov – 22	(Soviet Union) A. Sevidov
1982	2nd	4	42	21	13	8	63	32	54	GS	(Soviet Union) Mukhanov – 17	(Soviet Union) A. Sevidov
1983	2nd	15	42	13	13	16	51	47	38	R32	(Soviet Union) Mukhanov – 11 (Soviet Union) M. Chesnokov – 11	(Soviet Union) V. Rodionov (Soviet Union) Volchok
1984	2nd	6	42	17	13	12	44	37	46	R64	(Soviet Union) A. Kalashnikov – 8	(Soviet Union) Volchok
1985	2nd	6	42	16	11	15	52	51	43	R64	(Soviet Union) A. Kalashnikov – 14	(Soviet Union) Volchok
1986	2nd	6	46	21	11	14	63	48	53	R32	(Soviet Union) Gladilin – 16	(Soviet Union) Semin
1987	2nd	2	42	23	13	6	59	26	58	R128	(Soviet Union) A. Kalashnikov – 13	(Soviet Union) Semin
1988	1st	7	30	10	12	8	35	29	30	R32	(Soviet Union) Rusyayev – 15	(Soviet Union) Semin
1989	1st	15	30	7	9	14	20	32	23	R32	(Soviet Union) Rusyayev – 9	(Soviet Union) Semin
1990	2nd	4	38	19	9	10	52	34	47	RU	(Soviet Union) Sukhov – 11	(Soviet Union) Semin
1991	1st	16	30	5	8	17	18	47	18	SF	(Soviet Union) (Belarus) Kondratyev – 7	(Soviet Union) (Russia) Filatov
1992	no competition									SF		(Russia) Semin

=== Russia ===
Season	Div.	Pos.	Pl.	W	D	L	GS	GA	P	Cup	Europe		Top scorer (league)	Head coach
1992	1st	4	26	13	7	6	34	25	33	—	—		(Tajikistan) Mukhamadiev – 7	(Russia) Semin
1993	1st	5	34	14	11	9	45	29	39	R16	—		(Russia) Al. Smirnov – 9	(Russia) Semin
1994	1st	3	30	12	12	6	49	28	36	QF	UC	Round of 64	(Russia) Garin – 20	(Russia) Semin
1995	1st	2	30	20	5	5	52	23	55	QF	—		(Russia) Garin – 13	(Russia) Semin
1996	1st	6	34	15	10	9	46	31	55	W	UC	Round of 64	(Russia) Kosolapov – 10	(Russia) Semin
1997	1st	5	34	15	9	10	47	37	54	W	CWC	Round of 16	(Russia) Kosolapov – 9	(Russia) Semin
1998	1st	3	30	16	7	7	45	28	55	RU	CWC	Semi-final	(Russia) Borodyuk – 8 (Georgia (country)) Janashiya – 9	(Russia) Semin
1999	1st	2	30	20	5	5	62	30	65	R32	CWC	Semi-final	(Russia) Loskov – 14	(Russia) Semin
2000	1st	2	30	18	8	4	50	20	62	W	UC	Round of 64	(Russia) Loskov – 15	(Russia) Semin
2001	1st	2	30	16	8	6	53	24	56	W	UC	Round of 32	(Nigeria) Obiorah – 14	(Russia) Semin
2002	1st	1	31	20	9	2	47	14	69	R32	UCL; UC	First group stage Round of 32	(Russia) Loskov – 7 (Russia) Evseev – 7 (Russia) Pimenov – 7	(Russia) Semin
2003	1st	4	30	15	7	8	54	33	52	R16	UCL	Second group stage	(Russia) Loskov – 14	(Russia) Semin
2004	1st	1	30	18	7	5	44	19	61	QF	UCL	Round of 16	(Russia) Sychev – 15	(Russia) Semin
2005	1st	3	30	14	14	2	41	18	56	R32	—		(Russia) Bilyaletdinov – 8	(Russia) Semin (Russia) Eshtrekov
2006	1st	3	30	15	8	7	47	34	53	QF	UCL; UC	Third qualifying round Round of 32	(Russia) Loskov – 13	(Serbia) Muslin (Russia) Dolmatov
2007	1st	7	30	11	8	11	39	42	41	W	UC	First round	(Russia) Sychev – 11	(Russia) Byshovets
2008	1st	7	30	13	8	9	37	32	47	R32	UC	Group stage	(Nigeria) Odemwingie – 10	(Russia) Rakhimov
2009	1st	4	30	15	9	6	43	30	54	R32	—		(Russia) Sychev – 12	(Russia) Rakhimov (Uzbekistan) Maminov (Russia) Semin
2010	1st	5	30	13	9	8	34	29	48	R32	EL	Play-off Round	(Ukraine) Aliyev – 14	(Russia) Semin
2011–12	1st	7	44	18	12	14	59	48	66	QF	EL	Round of 32	(Russia) Glushakov – 11	(Russia) Krasnozhan (Uzbekistan) Maminov (Portugal) Couceiro
2012–13	1st	9	30	12	7	11	39	36	43	R16	—		(Senegal) N'Doye – 10	(Croatia) Bilić
2013–14	1st	3	30	17	8	5	51	23	59	R32	—		(Senegal) N'Doye – 13	(Belarus) Kuchuk
2014–15	1st	7	30	11	10	9	31	25	43	W	EL	Play-off Round	(Portugal) Fernandes – 7	(Belarus) Kuchuk (Tajikistan) Cherevchenko (Montenegro) Božović (Tajikistan) Cherevchenko
2015–16	1st	6	30	14	8	8	43	33	50	R16	EL	Round of 32	(Russia) Samedov – 9	(Tajikistan) Cherevchenko
2016–17	1st	8	30	10	12	8	39	27	42	W	—		(Portugal) Fernandes – 9	(Tajikistan) Cherevchenko (Uzbekistan) Pashinin (Russia) Semin
2017–18	1st	1	30	18	6	6	41	21	60	R32	EL	Round of 16	(Peru) Farfán – 10	(Russia) Semin
2018–19	1st	2	30	16	8	6	45	28	56	W	UCL	Group stage	(Russia) An. Miranchuk – 11	(Russia) Semin
2019–20	1st	2	30	16	9	5	41	29	57	R32	UCL	Group stage	(Russia) Al. Miranchuk – 12	(Russia) Semin (Serbia) Nikolić
2020–21	1st	3	30	17	5	8	45	35	56	W	UCL	Group stage	(Poland) Krychowiak – 9	(Serbia) Nikolić
2021–22	1st	6	30	13	9	8	43	39	48	R16	EL	Group stage	(Russia) Zhemaletdinov – 9	(Serbia) Nikolić (Germany) Gisdol (Russia) Loskov (Russia) Khapov
2022–23	1st	8	30	13	6	11	54	46	45	QF	—		(Russia) An. Miranchuk – 8 (France) Isidor – 8 (Russia) Dzyuba – 8	(Germany) Zinnbauer (Uzbekistan) Fyodorov (Russia) Galaktionov
2023–24	1st	4	30	14	11	5	52	38	53	QF	—		(Russia) Suleymanov – 7	(Russia) Galaktionov
2024–25	1st	6	30	15	8	7	51	41	53	SF	—		(Russia) Batrakov – 14	(Russia) Galaktionov

== Notable players ==
Had international caps for their respective countries. Players whose name is listed in bold represented their countries while playing for Lokomotiv.

USSR/Russia

- (Soviet Union) German Apukhtin
- (Soviet Union) **Valentin Bubukin**
- (Soviet Union) Yuri Chesnokov
- (Soviet Union) Yuri Gavrilov
- (Soviet Union) **Valery Gazzaev**
- (Soviet Union) Georgi Kondratyev
- (Soviet Union) **Vladimir Maslachenko**
- (Soviet Union) Valeri Novikov
- (Soviet Union) **Valery Petrakov**
- (Soviet Union) Anatoli Porkhunov
- (Soviet Union) Viktor Shishkin
- (Soviet Union) **Viktor Voroshilov**
- (Soviet Union) Georgi Yartsev
- (Russia) Dmitri Alenichev
- (Russia) Ari
- (Russia) **Aleksei Arifullin**
- (Russia) Zelimkhan Bakayev
- (Russia) **Dmitri Barinov**
- (Russia) **Aleksey Batrakov**
- (Russia) Maksim Belyayev
- (Russia) **Diniyar Bilyaletdinov**
- (Russia) (Soviet Union) Aleksandr Borodyuk
- (Russia) **Aleksei Bugayev**
- (Russia) Dmitri Bulykin
- (Russia) **Taras Burlak**
- (Russia) **Maksim Buznikin**
- (Russia) (Commonwealth of Independent States) (Soviet Union) Stanislav Cherchesov
- (Russia) **Igor Chugainov**
- (Russia) Igor Denisov
- (Russia) **Yuri Drozdov**
- (Russia) Georgi Dzhikiya
- (Russia) Artem Dzyuba
- (Russia) **Vadim Evseev**
- (Russia) **Denis Glushakov**
- (Russia) **Maksim Glushenkov**
- (Russia) (Soviet Union) **Sergei Gorlukovich**
- (Russia) **Maksim Grigoryev**
- (Russia) **Guilherme**
- (Russia) **Sergei Ignashevich**
- (Russia) **Vladislav Ignatyev**
- (Russia) **Marat Izmailov**
- (Russia) **Artyom Karpukas**
- (Russia) Zaur Khapov
- (Russia) **Yevgeni Kharlachyov**
- (Russia) **Dmitri Khokhlov**
- (Russia) **Nikolay Komlichenko**
- (Russia) **Aleksei Kosolapov**
- (Russia) Aleksandr Kovalenko
- (Russia) Oleg Kuzmin
- (Russia) **Ilya Lantratov**
- (Russia) Arseny Logashov
- (Russia) **Dmitri Loskov**
- (Russia) **Aleksei Miranchuk**
- (Russia) **Anton Miranchuk**
- (Russia) **Anton Mitryushkin**
- (Russia) **Yevgeny Morozov**
- (Russia) Andrei Mostovoy
- (Russia) (Tajikistan) **Mukhsin Mukhamadiev**
- (Russia) **Maksim Mukhin**
- (Russia) **Gennadiy Nizhegorodov**
- (Russia) **Ruslan Nigmatullin**
- (Russia) **Sergei Ovchinnikov**
- (Russia) Magomed Ozdoyev
- (Russia) **Roman Pavlyuchenko**
- (Russia) Maksim Petrov
- (Russia) **Ruslan Pimenov**
- (Russia) **Sergei Pinyayev**
- (Russia) **Sergei Podpaly**
- (Russia) Aleksandr Podshivalov
- (Russia) Dmitry Poloz
- (Russia) Igor Portnyagin
- (Russia) **Danil Prutsev**
- (Russia) Sergei Ryzhikov
- (Russia) **Aleksandr Samedov**
- (Russia) **Ilya Samoshnikov**
- (Russia) **Dmitri Sennikov**
- (Russia) Oleg Sergeyev
- (Russia) Aleksandr Sheshukov
- (Russia) **Roman Shishkin**
- (Russia) **Aleksandr Silyanov**
- (Russia) **Alexei Smertin**
- (Russia) Igor Smolnikov
- (Russia) **Fyodor Smolov**
- (Russia) **Andrei Solomatin**
- (Russia) **Dmitri Sychev**
- (Russia) **Dmitri Tarasov**
- (Russia) Bakhva Tedeyev
- (Russia) Oleg Teryokhin
- (Russia) **Dmitri Torbinski**
- (Russia) (Ukraine) Ilya Tsymbalar
- (Russia) **Dmitry Vorobyov**
- (Russia) **Renat Yanbayev**
- (Russia) **Andrey Yeshchenko**
- (Russia) **Rifat Zhemaletdinov**

Europe

- (Albania) **Mario Mitaj**
- (Armenia) Hovhannes Goharyan
- (Armenia) **Sargis Hovhannisyan**
- (Armenia) Arshak Koryan
- (Armenia) **Artur Sarkisov**
- (Armenia) **Albert Sarkisyan**
- (Armenia) **Edgar Sevikyan**
- (Armenia) **Nair Tiknizyan**
- (Azerbaijan) Narvik Sirkhayev
- (Belarus) Anton Amelchanka
- (Belarus) **Syarhey Amelyanchuk**
- (Belarus) **Syarhei Hurenka**
- (Belarus) Ihar Hurynovich
- (Belarus) **Andrei Lavrik**
- (Belarus) **Vitaly Lisakovich**
- (Belarus) **Ruslan Myalkovsky**
- (Belarus) **Mikalay Ryndzyuk**
- (Belarus) **Yan Tsiharow**
- (Bosnia and Herzegovina) Said Hamulić
- (Bosnia and Herzegovina) **Senijad Ibričić**
- (Bosnia and Herzegovina) **Emir Spahić**
- (Croatia) **Vedran Ćorluka**
- (Croatia) **Tomislav Dujmović**
- (Croatia) Tin Jedvaj
- (Croatia) **Dario Krešić**
- (Czech Republic) Marek Čech
- (Czech Republic) **Jan Kuchta**
- (Estonia) **Dmitri Kruglov**
- (Finland) Boris Rotenberg
- (France) Lassana Diarra
- (Georgia (country)) **Malkhaz Asatiani**
- (Georgia (country)) **Mikheil Ashvetia**
- (Georgia (country)) **Giorgi Chelidze**
- (Georgia (country)) **Giorgi Demetradze**
- (Georgia (country)) **Zaza Janashia**
- (Georgia (country)) **Khvicha Kvaratskhelia**
- (Georgia (country)) **Solomon Kvirkvelia**
- (Georgia (country)) **Davit Mujiri**
- (Germany) Benedikt Höwedes
- (Italy) Ivan Pelizzoli
- (Kazakhstan) Evgeniy Lovchev
- (Kazakhstan) **Valeriy Yablochkin**
- (Lithuania) **Deividas Česnauskis**
- (Lithuania) Robertas Fridrikas
- (Lithuania) **Valdas Ivanauskas**
- (Lithuania) **Arvydas Janonis**
- (Lithuania) Romas Mažeikis
- (Lithuania) **Vyacheslav Sukristov**
- (Moldova) **Stanislav Ivanov**
- (Montenegro) **Marko Baša**
- (Montenegro) Luka Đorđević
- (Montenegro) Marko Rakonjac
- (Poland) **Grzegorz Krychowiak**
- (Poland) **Maciej Rybus**
- (Portugal) **Eder**
- (Portugal) **João Mário**
- (Portugal) **Manuel Fernandes**
- (Romania) **Răzvan Cociş**
- (Scotland) **Garry O'Connor**
- (Serbia and Montenegro) **Milan Obradović**
- (Serbia) (Serbia and Montenegro) **Branislav Ivanović**
- (Serbia) Milan Jovanović
- (Serbia) **Nemanja Pejčinović**
- (Serbia) Slobodan Rajković
- (Serbia) **Petar Škuletić**
- (Slovakia) **Ján Ďurica**
- (Slovakia) **Marián Had**
- (Slovenia) **Branko Ilić**
- (Switzerland) Eldin Jakupović
- (Switzerland) **Reto Ziegler**
- (Ukraine) **Oleksandr Aliyev**
- (Ukraine) Taras Mykhalyk

South and Central America

- (Brazil) Francisco Lima
- (Brazil) Pablo
- (Brazil) Rodolfo
- (Costa Rica) **Winston Parks**
- (Ecuador) **Felipe Caicedo**
- (Ecuador) Cristian Ramírez
- (Haiti) Wilson Isidor
- (Mexico) **César Montes**
- (Peru) **Jefferson Farfán**
- (Suriname) Gyrano Kerk

Africa

- (Cameroon) **André Bikey**
- (Cameroon) **Gerzino Nyamsi**
- (Cape Verde) Zé Luís
- (Republic of the Congo) **Delvin N'Dinga**
- (Egypt) **Amr Zaki**
- (Ghana) **Baba Adamu**
- (Ghana) **Haminu Draman**
- (Ghana) **Laryea Kingston**
- (Guinea) **François Kamano**
- (Malawi) **Essau Kanyenda**
- (Mali) **Dramane Traoré**
- (Morocco) **Mbark Boussoufa**
- (Morocco) Manuel da Costa
- (Nigeria) **Brian Idowu**
- (Nigeria) Sani Kaita
- (Nigeria) **Victor Obinna**
- (Nigeria) **James Obiorah**
- (Nigeria) **Peter Odemwingie**
- (Senegal) **Baye Djiby Fall**
- (Senegal) **Dame N'Doye**
- (Senegal) **Oumar Niasse**
- (South Africa) **Jacob Lekgetho**
- (South Africa) **Bennett Mnguni**
- (Tunisia) **Chaker Zouaghi**

Asia

- (Kyrgyzstan) Mirlan Murzaev
- (Tajikistan) **Yuri Baturenko**
- (Tajikistan) Igor Cherevchenko
- (Tajikistan) **Khakim Fuzailov**
- (Tajikistan) Vitaliy Parakhnevych
- (Tajikistan) **Vasili Postnov**
- (Tajikistan) (Russia) Rashid Rakhimov
- (Uzbekistan) **Vitaliy Denisov**
- (Uzbekistan) Jasurbek Jaloliddinov
- (Uzbekistan) **Vladimir Maminov**
- (Uzbekistan) **Oleg Pashinin**
- (Uzbekistan) **Aleksey Polyakov**

== Club records ==
Top scorers
Player	Goals
(Russia) Dmitri Loskov	128
(Russia) Dmitri Sychev	92
(Soviet Union) Viktor Sokolov	91
(Soviet Union) Valentin Bubukin	70
(Soviet Union) Viktor Voroshilov	67
(Georgia (country)) Zaza Janashia	51
(Russia) Aleksei Kosolapov	51
(Russia) Yevgeni Kharlachyov	45
(Russia) Oleg Garin	44
(Uzbekistan) Vladimir Maminov	41

Appearances
Player	Matches
(Russia) Dmitri Loskov	421
(Uzbekistan) Vladimir Maminov	401
(Russia) Guilherme Marinato	387
(Russia) Sergei Ovchinnikov	367
(Belarus) Sergei Gurenko	334
(Russia) Yuri Drozdov	326
(Russia) Igor Chugainov	312
(Uzbekistan) Oleg Pashinin	285
(Russia) Dmitri Sychev	267
(Russia) Dmitri Sennikov	266

== Coaching staff ==
As of 13 October 2022

Position	Staff
Head coach	(Russia) Mikhail Galaktionov
Assistant head coach	(Russia) Zaur Khapov
Goalkeeper coach	(Austria) Sascha Marth
Fitness coach	(Brazil) Lucio da Silva (Russia) Sergey Alexeev
Supply Administration Specialist	(Russia) Vladimir Korotkov
Head doctor	(Ukraine) Ihor Kalyuzhnyi
Doctor	(Russia) Aleksey Miglo
Head of physiotherapy and Rehabilitation	(Austria) Martin Hämmerle
Manualtherapist	(Russia) Andrey Kuznetsov
Physiotherapist	(Russia) Sergey Semakin (Spain) Juan Alberto Pinar Sans
Translator	(Russia) Murat Sasiev (Ukraine) Dmytro Kraitor
Masseur	(Russia) Oleg Novikov (Russia) Andrey Osmanov
Administrator	(Russia) Stanislav Mitrokhin (Russia) Alexander Krumin
Operator	(Russia) Boris Dzagoev
Team Manager	(Germany) Eduard Schnorr

== See also ==
- FC Lokomotiv Moscow in Europe
- FC Kazanka Moscow
- WFC Lokomotiv Moscow
- RC Lokomotiv Moscow
